= Ope Ajayi =

Nigerian film producer

- Born: Lagos, Nigeria
- Citizenship: Nigeria
- Education: University of Lagos, Lagos Business School
- Occupation: Film producer

Ope Ajayi is a Nigerian film producer and promoter. He is the founder and CEO of Cinemax Distribution Limited and COTS Productions. He is also the convener of the Lagos Business Of Film Summit. He is best known as the executive producer of the Nigerian murder mystery series, The Party which was released on Netflix in May 2025. He is also an executive producer of the film Queen Lateefah, produced in partnership with Wumi Toriola and the co-executive producer of the films Brotherhood, Ada Omo Daddy and Thinline, in partnership with actress and producer Mercy Aigbe. He has licensed many films to multiple platforms, including Sista by Biodun Stephen, and Silence by Yemi "Filmboy" Morafa.

== Early life and education ==
Ajayi was born in Lagos, Nigeria. He completed his secondary education at the International School, University of Lagos, and earned a degree in Actuarial Science from the University of Lagos. He is also an alumnus of the Lagos Business school.

== Career ==
Ajayi spent his early career working in the financial services sector before moving to Genesis Cinemas.

Ajayi was appointed executive director at Genesis Group. In July 2022, he was elected as the National Chairman of the Cinema Exhibitors Association of Nigeria.

== Filmography ==
Year	Title	Major cast	Role	Reference
2022	Brotherhood	Tobi Bakre, Folarin Falana, Toni Tones, Ronke Oshodi Oke	Co-executive producer	
2023	Ada Omo Daddy	Mercy Aigbe, Omowunmi Dada, Nkechi Blessing, Sola Sobowale	Co-executive producer / producer	
2024	Queen Lateefah	Wumi Toriola, Kunle Remi, Fathia Williams, Femi Adebayo	Co-executive producer / producer	
2024	Thin Line	Mercy Aigbe, Uche Montana, Nkechi Blessing, Uzor Arukwe	Co-executive producer / producer	
2025	The Party	Kehinde Bankole, Shaffy Bello, Uzor Arukwe, Mide Martins	Executive producer and producer	
2025	Gingerrr	Bukunmi Adeaga-Ilori (popularly known as KieKie), Bisola Aiyeola, Wumi Toriola, Bolaji Ogunmola	Co-executive producer / producer	

== Awards and nominations ==
Year	Award	Category	Work	Result	Reference
2023	Africa Magic Viewers' Choice Awards	Best Movie West Africa	Brotherhood	Won	
2023	Africa Magic Viewers' Choice Awards	Best Overall Movie	Brotherhood	Nominated	
2026	Africa Magic Viewers' Choice Award	Best Movie	Gingerrr	Nominated	
2026	Africa Magic Viewers' Choice Award	Best Supporting Actress	Gingerrr	Nominated	
2026	Africa Magic Viewers' Choice Award	Best Supporting Actor	Gingerrr	Nominated	
2026	Africa Magic Viewers' Choice Award	Best Director	Gingerrr	Nominated	
2026	Africa Magic Viewers' Choice Award	Best Cinematography	Gingerrr	Nominated	
2026	Africa Magic Viewers' Choice Award	Best Score Music	Gingerrr	Nominated	
2026	Africa Magic Viewers' Choice Award	Best Sound Design	Gingerrr	Nominated	
2026	Africa Magic Viewers' Choice Award	Best Writing Movie	Gingerrr	Nominated	
2026	Africa Magic Viewers' Choice Award	Best Makeup	Gingerrr	Nominated	
2026	Africa Magic Viewers' Choice Award	Best Score Music	The Party	Nominated	
2026	Africa Magic Viewers' Choice Award	Best Writing (TV Series)	The Party	Nominated	
2026	Africa Magic Viewers' Choice Award	Best Sound Design	The Party	Nominated	
