= Lisa Omorodion =

Nigerian actress

- Born: London, England
- Education: University of Lagos
- Occupations: Actor, movie producer, entrepreneur

Lisa Omorodio professionally credited as Lisa Omorodion is a Nigerian actress, film producer, and entrepreneur. She is best known for her lead role in the 2013 movie, First Cut, alongside Joseph Benjamin and Monalisa Chinda. She is also known for her plus-sized figure.

== Early life and education ==
Omorodion was born on 27 April 1990, in London. Her father, who is of Edo descent is an Engineer and the founder of Hensmor Oil and Gas and her mother is a lawyer. She is the fifth of six children.

Omorodion attended Corona Primary School in Lagos, Nigeria. While in Primary school, she joined the school's drama club, where her passion for the arts was ignited. Thereafter, she attended Command Secondary School for three years and then Atlantic Hall, Poka Epe Secondary School for her senior secondary school years where she was also a part of the drama club. She then attended the University of Lagos, where she obtained a Bachelor's degree in Economics.

== Career ==
Omorodion produced and starred in her debut feature film First Cut in 2013. The film was noted for creating social awareness on sensitive issues such as rape and domestic violence. In the same year, she founded Platinum Studios, a Nigerian Film Production company. Since then, she has produced and starred in other movies such as Schemers (2015), The Inn (2016) Karma is Bae (2017). She made her small screen acting debut in the Obi Emelonye directed series The Calabash in 2014. In 2015, she began starring as Folakemi in the critically acclaimed television series Skinny Girl in Transit produced by Ndani TV.

== Personal life ==
Aside from film-making and acting, Omorodion serves as a director on the board of Hensmor Oil, an Oil and Gas firm founded by her father.

== Awards and recognition ==
In 2016, Omorodion received the award for Most Promising Actress of the Year by Nigeria Meritorious Award. She was also recognized as one of Nigeria's 25 under 25 Enterprising females by SME100 Africa in 2016. In the same year, she was nominated for the Most Promising Actress of the Year by City People Awards.

== Filmography ==
=== Feature films ===
Year	Title	Role	Director	Notes
2013	First Cut	KC Morgan	Lisa Omorodion	Theatrical released full feature film, produced by Platinum Studios
2014	Calabash		Obi Emelonye	Premiered on Africa Magic
2014	Ikogosi	Emilia	Toka Mcberor	Premiered on Africa Magic and irokotv
2014	The Other Side of The Coin		Lancelot Oduwa Imasuen	Premiered on ibakatv
2014	Therapist		Lancelot Imasuen	Premiered on Ibaka TV
2014	Open Marriage	Bose	Chico Ejiro	Premiered on Africa Magic and irokotv
2014	On a Trip		Grace Edwin Okon	Drama
2014	Peppersoup		Grace Edwin Okon	Comedy / Drama
2015	Schemers	Naomi	Lisa Omorodion	Premiered on Africa Magic and Iroko TV
2016	WoEman		Damijo Efe Young	Premiered on Ibaka TV
2016	Moth to a Flame	Rosaline	One Soul	Premiered on irokotv
2016	What a Day		Emmanuel Eme	
2016	That Very Weekend		Emmanuel Eme	Premiered on Ibaka TV
2016	The Inn	Janet Money	Lisa Omorodion	Premiered on ibakatv
2016	Karma is Bae		Lisa Omorodion	Premiered on Ibaka TV
2016	The Relationship	Abike	Rukky Sanda	Premiered on Ibaka TV
2016	Whose Meal Ticket	Lisa Philips	Grace Edwin Okon	Theatrical Release and Premiered on Ibaka TV
2016	Excess Luggage	Gorgiana	Damijo Efe Young	Theatrical Release
2016	Jofran		Okechukwu Oku	Premiered on Africa Magic
2016	The Personal Assistant		Rukky Sanda	Premiered on Iroko TV
2017	Little Drops of Happy	Tega	Grace Edwin Okon	Theatrical Release
2017	Your Fada	Yemisi	Simon Peacemaker	Theatrical Release and Premiered on Ibaka TV
2017	Date Night	Sandra	Mercy Aigbe	Premiered on Iroko TV
2017	Dark Past		Chika Ike	Premiered on Ibaka TV
2017	Waiting to Exhale		Sobe Charles Umeh and Simon Peacemaker	Premiered on Conga TV
2017	Levi	Ebere	Okechukwu Oku	Drama
2018	Ghetto Bred		Eniola Badmus	Comedy
2018	The Spell		Grace Edwin Okon	Drama / Fantasy
2018	Night Bus to Lagos		Chico Ejiro	Drama
2019	Rising Above	Juliet	Tope Alake	Comedy / Drama
2020	All Shades	Juliana	Tissy Nnachi	Drama
2021	Customer Care	Esther	Paul Frank	Drama
2023	Alternate Feelings		Okey Ifeanyi	Romance

=== Television series ===
Year	Title	Director	Notes
2014 –	Skinny Girl in Transit		Produced by Ndani TV; featured in Seasons 1 and 2
2014	About Tomorrow	Lancelot Oduwa Imasuen	Premiered on Iroko TV
2014	Happy Family	Elvis Chuks	
