= List of Nigerian films of 2007 =

This is a list of Nigerian films released in 2007.

== Films ==
Title	Director	Cast	Genre	Notes	Ref
2007
Ezra	Newton I. Aduaka	Mamoudu Turay Kamara	Drama	Won Grand Prize at Ouagadougou Panafrican Film and Television Festival	
Europe by Road.. Miles Away from Africa 1 and 2	Ikenna Ezeugwu	Kevin Bucks Leo Chimmezie Chris Onyenso Rahim Kas		Shot in English Language, Igbo and Pidgin Released on VCD by Project Africa Film and Columbia Production/Time Entertainment	
Final Hour 1 and 2	Afam Okereke	Oge Okoye Nonso Diobi Uche Jombo Tonto Dikeh	Drama	Shot in Yoruba Language Released on DVD by Simony/Franco.	
Irapada (Redemption)	Kunle Afolayan Biodun Aleja	Kunle Afolayan Deola Oloyede Jotham Ayuba Angela Philips	Thriller	Shot in Yoruba Language Released on DVD by Golden Effects.	
Letters to a Stranger	Fred Amata	Genevieve Nnaji Joke Silva Yemi Blaq	Romantic comedy		
Last Messiah	Moses Ebere	Nkem Owoh Fabian Adibe Roy Denani Miriam Apolo		Made in 3 parts	
Life Incidence: A Day to Destiny	Iyke Odife	Jim Iyke Mike Ezuruonye Ebube Nwagbo Browny Igboegwu		Made in 4 parts	
Made in Cambridge	Mac-Collins Chidebe	Nkem Owoh Louisa Nwobodo Funmi Holder Gardiel Onwudiwe	Comedy	Made in 2 parts	
The Faculty	Ugo Ugbor	Ramsey Nouah Jim Iyke Oge Okoye McMorris Ndubueze		Made in 3 parts and was produced by Simony productions	

== See also ==
- List of Nigerian films
