= Ada Omo Daddy =

2023 Nigerian movie

- Directed by: Akay Mason; Adebayo Tijani
- Written by: Yakubu Olawale Moshood
- Produced by: Mercy Aigbe Ope Ajayi
- Starring: Chiwetalu Agu; Sola Sobowale; Charles Okafor; Omowumi Dada
- Cinematography: Barnabas Emordi
- Edited by: Adio Solanke
- Music by: Adam Songbird
- Distributed by: Cinemax distribution
- Release date: 15 December 2023
- Country: Nigeria
- Language: English

Ada Omo Daddy is a 2023 Nigerian family-oriented comedy drama written by Yakubu Olawale, co-produced by Mercy Aigbe, and co-directed by Akay Mason and Adebayo Tijani. The movie hinges mainly on a paternity deception unraveled in the course of a wedding party popularly known as the "Owanbe" in Yoruba. The movie featured some Nollywood actors such as Charles Okafor, Sola Sobowale, Mercy Aigbe, Chiwetalu Agu and Uche Ndubuisi.

== Plot ==
Ada Omo Daddy tells the story of Pero who is set to marry Victor. Pero’s life takes a dramatic turn when Ifeanyi suddenly appeared claiming to be her biological father, stirring up trouble in the seemingly perfect Balogun family. The sudden appearance of Ifeanyi, estranged but now repentant, unfolds unpleasant past secrets that must be resolved before Pero’s wedding with Victor.

== Cast ==
- Sola Sobowale as Mrs. Ireti Balogun
- Mercy Aigbe as older Moturanyo
- Omowumi Dada as Peresola "Pero" Balogun
- Tayo Faniran as Victor
- Charles Okafor as Ifeanyi
- Chiwetalu Agu as Uncle Ndubuisi
- Wunmi Toriola
- Taiwo Adeyemi
- Adeniyi Johnson as young Ifeanyi
- Carol King as Mrs. Ekpeyong
- Dele Odule as Chief Balogun
- Tomi Ojo as Fara
- Nkechi Blessing as Ndidi
- Unusual Phyna as Young Ireti
- Miriam Peters as Ezinne
- Morenikeji Gloria
- Fred Amata

== Reception ==
Ada Omo Daddy was listed among the top ten movies for the 2023 festive season by Premium Times.
