= Colours of Fire =

2025 Nigerian film by Niyi Akinmolayan

- Directed by: Niyi Akinmolayan
- Written by: Niyi Akinmolayan
- Starring: Uzor Arukwe; Osas Ighodaro; Mercy Aigbe; Gabriel Afolayan; Femi Branch; Ibrahim Chatta
- Edited by: Dolapo Adigun
- Production companies: Anthill Studios; FilmOne Studios; Imuetinyan Productions
- Distributed by: FilmOne Entertainment
- Release date: December 24, 2025 (Nigeria)
- Running time: 125 minutes
- Country: Nigeria
- Languages: English; Yoruba

Colours of Fire is a 2025 Nigerian epic drama film written and directed by Niyi Akinmolayan. It was produced by Anthill Studios in collaboration with FilmOne Studios and Imuetinyan Productions, and distributed by FilmOne Entertainment. The film stars Uzor Arukwe, Osas Ighodaro, Mercy Aigbe, Gabriel Afolayan, Femi Branch and Ibrahim Chatta. It was released in Nigerian cinemas on 24 December 2025.

== Plot ==
In an ancient setting, two rival groups known as the Blue Tribe and the Red Tribe maintain a long-standing hostility based on inherited stories and mutual suspicion. The Blue Tribe is associated with fabric-making and a form of sacred blue magic called Elu. The Red Tribe is linked in rumour to blood, darker forces and disorder. When reports spread of a monstrous figure attacking people connected to the Blue Tribe, a warrior named Akinbode is sent to eliminate the threat.

During his mission he encounters Moremi, daughter of Efunsetan, Queen of the red tribe, a woman from the rival group. Their meeting leads him to question the official accounts of the conflict.

The movie begins with a combat between Akinbode and Moremi which ends up in an intense lovemaking session. Akinbode returns home under the pretense that he killed the beast, and everyone believes him, except Badero, the son of King Abifarin. Badero believes that killing Efunsetan is the total victory the blue tribe needs. He tries to probe Akinbode into revealing the true incident that happened during his fight with the beast, but he doesn't.

Certain that the beast has been defeated, Akinbode leads the blue tribe to pick out the Elu leaves. During the process, it seems they hear the beast, but it is just the sound of rain. The Blue tribe celebrates, certain that they will no longer be terrorized by the red tribe.

Meanwhile, at the red tribe, Moremi is questioned by her mother, the queen, Efunsetan, who believes that her daughter did not use the poison pin as instructed. Unknown to them, the reason the pin didn't work was because it was Akinbode who was sent not Badero. The poison pin was created for Badero.

Akinbode travels to the red tribe disguised as one of them. He meets Moremi, and they begin a love affair. She shows him the secret of how they achieve their red, different from what he had been told at the blue tribe. She also shows him their sacred ritual dance "Afefe". At the dance, some of Badero's henchmen attack, Akinbode kills them and returns to the palace of Efunsetan where he sees Badero almost at the point of death. He fights Efunsetan while Badero flees. Wounded, Moremi appears and begs her mother for mercy, revealing that she loves him.

They appeal to her to forge an alliance with the blue tribe. She refuses claiming that she had tried to show Abifarin the secret of the red, a plant she discovered when she was much younger. But he refused because he couldn't accept this revelation from a girl. She also discloses that she had been approached by the beast warning her that Badero would be sent to kill her. It is then Akinbode realizes that he was sent as the sacrificial lamb to the beast, because King Abifarin did not want his son to die.

Akinbode and Moremi travel to the blue tribe where they try to show Abifarin the secret of the red. During her Afefe dance, she is interrupted by Abifarin who believes it is witchcraft and not what they claim it is. He orders his soldiers to seize her, but Akinbode fights them off. Moremi is mortally wounded by Badero who challenges Akinbode to a duel. In the ensuing fight, Badero is mortally wounded by Akinbode, and his father, King Abifarin tries to save him. Baba, the Ifa priest, steps in and kills Abifarin. It is then revealed that Baba is the father of Akinbode and the beast.

Akinbode begs him to resurrect Moremi, and he is sent off with her in a boat; a ritual they hope will awaken her.

.

== Cast ==
- Uzor Arukwe as Akinbode
- Osas Ighodaro as Moremi
- Mercy Aigbe as Efunsetan
- Gabriel Afolayan as Badero
- Femi Branch as Abifarin
- Ibrahim Chatta as Baba Agba

== Production ==
The film was written and directed by Niyi Akinmolayan. It was produced by Anthill Studios with FilmOne Studios and Imuetinyan Productions. Dolapo Adigun served as the editor. The production made use of visual effects, including computer-generated imagery. Costume and set design emphasised colour symbolism. The film contains dialogue in English and Yoruba and has a running time of approximately 125 minutes. An exclusive preview was shown at the 2025 FilmOne Exhibitors' Showcase in October 2025 at Filmhouse IMAX, Lekki.

== Release ==
Colours of Fire was released in cinemas across Nigeria on 24 December 2025. Shortly after the opening, Akinmolayan publicly criticised certain cinema operators. He stated that some venues listed the film on their websites, sold tickets, and then failed to screen it.

== Reception ==
The film earned approximately ₦51.1 million in its first week of release. By January 2026 it had surpassed ₦100 million. One later report placed the total at around ₦134 million.

Critical reception was mixed. Reviewers frequently noted the scale of the visual effects, costume design and production design. Performances by Uzor Arukwe and Osas Ighodaro were singled out for praise in several notices.

== Awards ==
At the 12th Africa Magic Viewers' Choice Awards (AMVCA) in 2026, Colours of Fire received four nominations and won three awards.

Award	Date of ceremony	Category	Recipient(s)	Result	Ref.
Africa Magic Viewers' Choice Awards	9 May 2026	Best Lead Actor	Uzor Arukwe	Won	
Africa Magic Viewers' Choice Awards	9 May 2026	Best Supporting Actor	Gabriel Afolayan	Nominated	
Africa Magic Viewers' Choice Awards	9 May 2026	Best Costume Design	Valerie Okeke	Won	
Africa Magic Viewers' Choice Awards	9 May 2026	Best Art Direction	Ajamolaya Bunmi; Yakub Oladejo	Won	
