= Perfect Combination (book) =

2012 book by Jamillah and David Lamb

- First edition
- Author: Jamillah and David Lamb
- Language: English
- Genre: Self-Help
- Publisher: Between The Lines Productions, Inc.
- Publication date: 16 February 2012
- Publication place: United States
- Pages: 180
- ISBN: 978-0-9849250-0-1

Perfect Combination, or Perfect Combination: Seven Key Ingredients to Happily Living & Loving Together, is a self-help book by authors Jamillah and David Lamb focused on romantic relationships. In the book, the authors' personal relationship is recounted in both narrative and diary form.

Perfect Combination has been featured in media outlets including The Huffington Post, Amsterdam News, Harlem World Magazine, NBC's The Grio, and The New York Times. The book explores such themes as love, ethnic identity, musical culture, and self-improvement.

== Background ==
Jamillah and David Lamb are married and live in Brooklyn, New York. As business partners they founded Between The Lines Productions, Inc., and are producers of the Off-Broadway play Platanos Y Collard Greens.

== Bibliography ==
Lamb, Jamillah and David (2012). Perfect Combination. Between The Lines Productions, Inc. p. 180. ISBN 978-0-9849250-0-1.
