= My Mirror =

- Directed by: Gboyega Ashowo
- Produced by: Jumoke Odetola
- Starring: Seun Akindele, Odunlade Adekola and Afeez Owo
- Release date: 6 June 2021 (Lagos, Nigeria)
- Country: Nigeria
- Language: English

My Mirror is a 2021 Nigerian movie produced by Jumoke Odetola and directed by Gboyega Ashowo. The movie addresses the different kinds of abuse suffered by men and it stars Seun Akindele, Odunlade Adekola and Afeez Owo.

== Plot ==
The movie addresses the belief of the society that men must not express their feelings and pains. This notion makes men to suppress their agonies which can eventually depress them.

== Premiere ==
The movie was premiered on 6 June 2021 in Lagos State. The premiering was attended by celebrities such as Ayo Adesanya, Mr Macaroni, Seun Akindele, Korede Bello, Femi Adebayo, Ben Touitou, Jide Awobona, Owen Gee, Gt Da Guitarman and Rotimi Salami.

== Cast ==
- Seun Akindele
- Odunlade Adekola
- Afeez Owo Abiodun
- Ayo Olaiya
- Omolara Daud
- Jumoke Odetola
- Allwell Ademola

== See also ==
- List of Nigerian films of 2021
