= Queen Lateefah =

2024 Nigerian drama film directed by Adeoluwa Owu

- Directed by: Adeoluwa Owu
- Written by: Anthony Kehinde Joseph
- Produced by: Wumi Toriola; Ope Ajayi
- Starring: Wumi Toriola; Kunle Remi; Femi Adebayo
- Production companies: Wumi Toriola Productions; Captain of the Sea Productions
- Distributed by: Cinemax Nigeria
- Release date: 27 September 2024
- Country: Nigeria
- Box office: ₦365,517,443

Queen Lateefah is a 2024 Nigerian drama film written by Anthony Kehinde Joseph, directed by Adeoluwa Owu and produced by Ope Ajayi and Wumi Toriola. The film stars Wumi Toriola in the titular role. The film had its theatrical release on 27th September 2024 and opened to positive reviews from critics. The film became the highest-grossing Nigerian film of 2024 with a box office collection of ₦365,517,443 million.

== Synopsis ==
Lateefah Adeleke, a 30 year old businesswoman, initially portrays herself in high esteem, pursuing a lavish posh lifestyle, thereby stamping her authority with high society status. Her encounter with Jide Rhodes, a 35 year old businessman, ends up badly for her as the truth about her life is exposed. Lateefah had pretended to be a person with a business background, when in stark contrast she was raised in abject poverty and was the only child of an illiterate mother.

== Cast ==
- Wumi Toriola as Lateefah Adeleke
- Kunle Remi as Jide Rhodes
- Femi Adebayo
- Lateef Adedimeji
- Nancy Isime
- Bimbo Manuel
- Elvina Ibru
- Enioluwa Adeoluwa
- Gbugbemi Ejeye
- Broda Shaggi
- Jumoke Odetola

== Production ==
The film project was announced by Adeoluwa Owu, who had narrated a script specifically tackling the theme revolving around the concept of a grass-to-grace storyline and rags-to-riches elements. The film was a collaborative production between Wumi Toriola Productions and Captain of the Sea Productions.

== Box office ==
The film became a commercial success at the box office within a few weeks of its theatrical release. Upon the film's theatrical release, few records tumbled on the way, including the record collection achieved by a Nollywood film in the opening weekend for a non-holiday period, and the film also renewed the record for having registered the highest Nollywood opening weekend by an independent distributor in 2024. As per an official announcement by Cinemax Nigeria, which held the distribution rights of the film, it was reported that the film had collected ₦57.7 million in its opening weekend.

The film grossed ₦200 million within the first three weeks of its theatrical release. In early November 2024, the film generated a record box office collection of ₦333.7 million with record sales of approximately 80,500 tickets. The film established the record for the highest-grossing Nigerian film on a non-December release, adjusted for inflation. According to the month-end reports of November 2024, the film raked in ₦350 million at the box office and became the seventh highest-grossing Nigerian film of all time, and it secured the top position in the list of highest-grossing Nigerian films of the year 2024.
