= Osas Ighodaro =

Nigerian-American actress

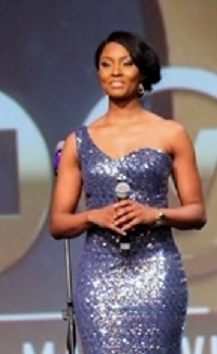
- Ighodaro at the Africa Magic Viewers Choice Awards in Lagos (2014)
- Born: Osariemen Martha Elizabeth Ighodaro; New York, United States
- Education: Pennsylvania State University; Actors Studio Drama School at Pace University
- Occupations: Actress; television host
- Years active: 2003–present
- Spouse: Gbenro Ajibade (m. 2015–2019)
- Children: 1
- Awards: See below
- Website: Official website

Osariemen Martha Elizabeth Ighodaro, better known as Osas Ighodaro, is a Nigerian-American actress, television host and philanthropist. She won the 2010 Miss Black USA Pageant and founded the Joyful Joy Foundation, a fundraising organization for malaria. Ighodaro emerged as the highest-grossing Nollywood actress of 2018 and was awarded Best Actress in a Drama consecutively at the 2022 and 2023 AMVCA for her roles in Rattlesnake: The Ahanna Story and Man of God, respectively.

== Early life and background ==
Ighodaro was born in the Bronx, New York, United States, to Nigerian parents of Edo origin. She obtained her degree in Broadcast Journalism with dual minor degrees in Entrepreneurship and Theater from Pennsylvania State University. She further obtained her MA in Fine Arts from the Actors Studio Drama School at Pace University. She is a member of Alpha Kappa Alpha sorority and the founder of Imuetinyan Productions.

== Career ==
Ighodaro began her acting career in New York after graduating college. She started with performing in theatre plays and indie films. In 2012, she moved to Nigeria where she played acting roles in Nollywood films including Adanna in Tinsel.

Since then, she has starred in Cadillac Records, The Smart Money Woman and Gbomo Gbomo Express. Following her performance in Rattlesnake: The Ahanna Story and Man of God (2022), she was awarded the Best Actress in a Drama' awards at the 2022 and 2023 Africa Magic Viewers Choice Awards respectively.

Ighodaro co-hosted The Headies 2022, The Headies 2023, 2014 Africa Magic Viewers Choice Awards and the family show Maltina Dance All.

Osas Ighodaro won Best Actress in a Drama at the 2022 and 2023 Africa Magic Viewers Choice Awards for her performances in *Rattlesnake: The Ahanna Story* and *Man of God*, respectively, highlighting her continued critical success in Nollywood.

== Personal life ==
Ighodaro was married to Gbenro Ajibade in June 2015 and had their first child in 2016. They divorced shortly after.

== Filmography ==
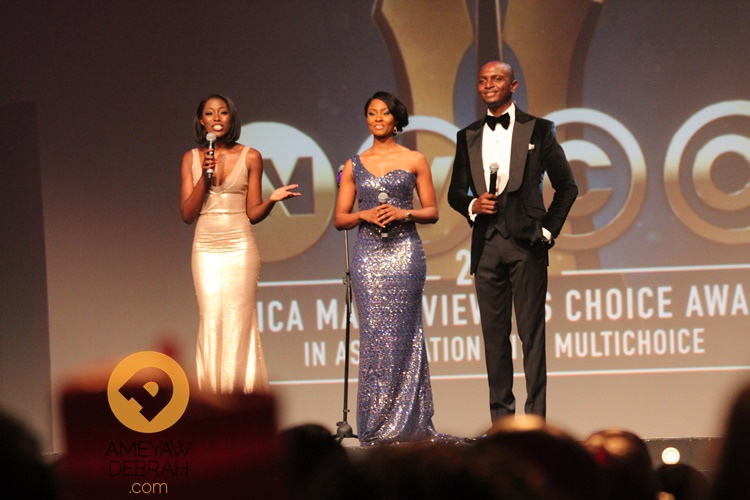
Osas Ighodaro, Vimbai Mutinhiri and IK Osakioduwa hosting the 2014 Africa Magic Viewers Choice Awards

=== Film ===
Year	Title	Role	Notes
2006	Killa Season	Shinae	Video
2006	Hookers in Revolt	Delilah	Video
2006	My African Uncle	-	Short
2007	Luggage	Sade's sister (singing voice)	Short
2008	Across a Bloodied Ocean	Nafisa	Short
2008	Cadillac Records	Maid	
2008	Jewslim	Rochelle Whitman	
2009	Notorious	Party Girl	
2009	Park Sharks	Neglected Girlfriend	
2010	Computer Love	Chastity	
2010	The Tested	Sheena	
2011	Computer Love	Chastity	
2011	He Said, She Said: A Romantic Comedy	Donna	Video
2011	Psa 64	Woman Scorned 64	Short
2015	The Department	Tolu Okoye	
2015	Gbomo Gbomo Express	Cassandra	
2015	Where Children Play	Nia	
2016	Entreat	Margaret	
2016	Put a Ring on it	Eki	
2017	Idahosa Trails	Osamuede	
2017	Little Drops of Happy	Mano Ojo	
2017	Wurukum Roundabout	-	
2017	Countdown	Helen	
2017	White Pickett Fence	Brenda Caldwell	Short
2018	New Money	Angela Nwachukwu	
2018	A Rose for Freddy	Kemi	
2018	Merry Men: The Real Yoruba Demons	Chidinma	
2018	We Don't Live Here Anymore	Leslie	
2018	King of Boys	Sade Bello	
2019	My Mfon - an election day story	Sola Bassey	Short
2019	Bling Lagosians	Demidun	
2019	Your Excellency	Candy	
2020	Kenim O Presents: A Second Husband	Tope	Short
2020	Double Strings	Detective Isoken	
2020	Mama Drama	Mena	Drama
2020	Rattlesnake: The Ahanna Story	Amara	
2020	Ratnik	Sarah Bello	
2021	Namaste Wahala	Preemo	
2021	Mamba's Diamond	Eloho	Action
2021	Keeping Promise	Teni	Drama
2021	Bad Comments	Hilda	Comedy
2021	The Ghost and the Tout Too	Amoke	Comedy / Fantasy
2021	Who Lived at Number 6	Dimma	Drama
2022	Man of God	Teju	
2022	Knee Down	Ese	
2022	Single Not Searching	Kai	
2022	Conversations in Transit	Adeola	
2023	Love, Lust and Other Things	Lydia Danjuma	
2023	3 Cold Dishes	Esosa	
2024	When Love Strikes	Tinuke	
2024	Olufemi	Kareemat	
2024	Someone Like You	Ciarra	Drama
2024	Breakthrough	Ada	
2024	Safari	Nkiru	
2025	Colours of Fire	Moremi	Drama

== Television ==
Year	Title	Role	Notes
2006	Conviction	Desmond's Date	Episode: "Breakup"
2007	Law & Order	Model	Episode: "Bling"
2010	Meet the Browns	Nurse Mileen	Episode: "Meet the Unwelcome Back"
2012	12 Steps to Recovery	Jellybean	Episode: "Jellybean and Things"
2012	Tinsel	Adanna (Danni)	Recurring cast: season 5
2013-14	Parallels	Ruth Marshall	Main cast
2013-15	Maltina Dance All	Herself/host	TV series
2018	EVE (Africa Magic)	Sylvia	TV series
2019	Shuga	Sergeant Iyanu	Main cast: season 7
2020	Assistant Madams	Chioma	Main cast
2020	The Smart Money Woman	Zuri	Main cast 9 episodes
2021	King of Boys: The Return of the King	Sade Bello	Recurring cast

== Theatre ==
Year	Title	Role	Company
2017	Fela & The Kalakuta Queens	Malaika	BAP Productions
2017	Wedding Blues	Joke	Lagos Theatre Festival
2016	Sarafina	Mary Masumbuko	AFRIFF
2014	For Colored Girls (Nigerian Adaptation)	Lady in Purple	Fly Time Productions
2011	Dolores (by Edward Allen Baker)	Dolores	Actors Studio Drama School
2010	Underground	Queen	Poetic Theatre Production
2008	Platanos Y Collard Greens	Malady	Between the Lines Productions
2006	Revenge of a King	Afi	NYC Fringe
2005	Joe Turner's Come and Gone	Martha Pentecost	August Wilson Play Festival
2005	The Colored Museum	Lawanda / Model	Citizen Bank Theatre
2005	Ladies Night at the Cotton Club	Josephine Baker	Loaves & Fish Repertory
2003	Shades of Black and Grey	Mia	PSU Union Theatre

== Awards and nominations ==
Year	Event	Category	Work	Result	Ref
2010	Miss Black USA Pageant	Miss Black USA 2010		Won	
2014	ELOY Awards	Actress of the Year - TV	Tinsel	Won	
2015	Green October La Mode Magazine Awards	Humanitarian Award	Joyful Joy Foundation	Won	
2015	ELOY Awards	Brand Ambassador of the Year	Polo Avenue; Konga.com	Won	
2015	ELOY Awards	Actress of the Year - Film	The Department	Nominated	
2016	Golden Movie Awards	Golden Supporting Actress	''Gbomo Gbomo Express	Nominated	
2016	2016 Nigeria Entertainment Awards	Supporting Actress of The Year	''Gbomo Gbomo Express	Won	
2021	Best of Nollywood Awards	Best Actress in a Lead Role	Rattlesnake: The Ahanna Story	Nominated	
2021	Best of Nollywood Awards	Best Kiss in a Movie	Rattlesnake: The Ahanna Story	Nominated	
2021	Her Network - Woman of the Year Awards	Woman of the Year in Entertainment		Won	
2022	Africa Magic Viewers' Choice Awards	Best Actress in A Drama	Rattlesnake: The Ahanna Story	Won	
2022	Africa Movie Academy Awards	Best Actress in a Leading Role	Man of God	Nominated	
2023	Africa Magic Viewers' Choice Awards	Best Actress In A Drama, Movie Or TV Series	Man of God	Won	

== See also ==
- List of Nigerian actresses
