= Uche Chika Elumelu =

Nigerian actress

- Citizenship: Nigeria
- Education: University of Ibadan
- Occupation: Actress

Uche Chika Elumelu is a Nigerian actress.

== Career ==
Uche graduated from the Department of Geography, University of Ibadan with first class honours. She also holds a diploma in Acting for Film from the prestigious New York Film Academy. Her recent major screen appearance was her portrayal of "Onajite" in the Prime Video film release, SUSPICION. She has worked with Terra Kulture on several productions as a stage actor.

== Filmography ==
Year	Title	Role	Ref.
2020	This Lady Called Life	Neighbour	
2020	Riona (TV series)	Arubi	
2021	The Wait	Amaka	
2022	She	Ngozi Okpara	
2023	All the Colours of the World Are Between Black and White	Mama	
2024	10th Avenue	Akunna Uzoma	

== Theatre ==
Year	Production	Role	Theatre	Ref.
2014	Hear Word!		MUSON Centre, American Repertory Theatre	
2016	Heartbeat The Musical	Eseosa	MUSON Centre	
2018	Legends The Musical	Queen Amina of Zazzau	MUSON Centre	
2018	Saro The Musical		MUSON Centre	
2018	The Secret Lives Of Baba Segi's Wives		Presented as part of 2018 Ake Arts and Book Festival	
2019	Hertitude	Kesiena	Kongi's Harvest Art Gallery, Freedom Park	
2023	Anatomy Of A Woman		Terra Kulture	
2022	Baby Shower	Amanda	Terra Kulture	
