= Little Drops of Happy =

- Directed by: Grace Edwin-Okon
- Produced by: Maymunah Kadiri
- Starring: Ngozi Nwosu, Mercy Aigbe, Osas Ighodaro Ajibade, Ayoola Ayoola, Emem Inwang, Mirabel Oboba
- Production company: Derwin Productions
- Release date: 2017
- Country: Nigeria
- Language: English

Little Drops of Happy is a 2017 Nigerian therapeutical movie facilitated by Pinnacle Medicals Speakout initiative in conjunction with Derwin productions with support from the American Embassy. The movie creates awareness about mental health, depression, suicide and how they can be tackled. The movie is written, directed and produced by Grace Edwin-Okon and Executive producer is Dr. Maymunah Kadiri it stars Ngozi Nwosu, Mercy Aigbe, Osas Ighodaro, Ayoola Ayoola and others.

== Synopsis ==
The movie revolves around a woman who had to deal with domestic violence and unfaithfulness of her husband. She was mentally depressed to the Sathe of being called a mad woman. Eventually, she was able to save herself and her promiscuous husband.

== Premiere ==
The movie first premiered at Genesis Deluxe Cinema, Lekki, Lagos on November 18, 2017. It was also premiered at Silverbird Galleria, Victoria Island, Lagos State and nationwide.

== Cast ==
- Ayoola Ayoola as Femi Ojo
- Ngozi Nwosu as Reverend Chi
- Seun Kentebe as Doctor
- Osarehia Oronsaye as Ify
- Lisa Omorodion as Tega
- Mercy Aigbe as Yetunde
- Osas Ighodaro as Mano Ojo
- Ayobami Ajayi as Child 3
- Enem Inwang as Chidi.
