= Allwell Ademola =

Nigerian actress (1976–2025)

- Born: 9 August 1976; Lagos, Lagos State, Nigeria
- Died: 27 December 2025 (aged 49); Agege, Lagos State, Nigeria
- Burial place: Yaba Cemetery, Lagos
- Occupation: Actress
- Years active: 1985–2025
- Notable work: False Flag
- Relatives: Adetokunbo Ademola (grandfather)

Allwell Adémọ́lá (9 August 1976 – 27 December 2025) was a Nigerian actress. After a career as a child actress on television, Ademola began appearing in Nollywood films from 1992, performing in both English and Yoruba, in addition to producing and screenwriting. Ademola also appeared on stage, including at the National Theatre, and released an album in 2006 with the band Allwell and Company.

== Early life ==
Ademola was born on 9 August 1976 in Lagos, Lagos State, into a Yoruba family. She was a granddaughter of Adetokunbo Ademola, the first chief justice of Nigeria. Ademola's ancestry included royal lineage originating in Abeokuta, Ogun State, including her great-grandfather, who was the Alake of Egbaland.

Ademola was previously engaged; her fiancé died prior to their wedding.

== Career ==
After being scouted by Uncle Wole in 1985, Ademola's first credit was an appearance on his television show Animal Games with Uncle Wole, which was produced by the Nigerian Television Authority. She gained greater attention for the children's television series Tales by Moonlight.

Ademola began acting in Nollywood productions in 1992, appearing alongside actors including Jide Kosoko, although it was not until the 2010s that she began receiving greater attention and acclaim for her roles in films including You or I (2013), Omo Emi and False Flag (both 2017) and Ile Wa (2018). Ademola performed in both Yoruba and English productions, and was described as supporting the early career of actor and producer Rotimi Salami.

The year after her Nollywood debut, Ademola began her theatre career, starring in National Council of Arts and Culture productions at the National Theatre in 1993. From 1995, Ademola performed with the Royalty of the Black Theatre Movement at venues including the Muson Centre and the Apapa Club.

Ademola established her own production company, Allwell Ademola Production, which produced several films that she directed and wrote.

In 2002, Ademola formed a band, Allwell and Company. It released an album in 2006.

On 16 March 2026, Ademola's directorial debut, Kilanko: The Invincible Child, was released posthumously in Nigeria. It grossed 36.9 million NGN.

== Death ==
On 27 December 2025, Ademola reportedly complained of having difficulty breathing at her home in Lagos. She was transported to Ancilla Hospital in Agege, where she died of a heart attack. It was initially reported that Ademola had been 43 when she died, but a subsequent statement by her family clarified she had been 49. Ademola's death occurred shortly after she posted a video on Instagram stating that "this year will not see my end".

Ademola's colleagues publicly mourned her death, including Mide Martins, Bidemi Kosoko, Damola Olatunji, Faithia Williams, Seun Oloketuyi and Rotimi Salami. The Theatre Arts and Movie Practitioners Association of Nigeria released a statement commemorating her life and career.

On 3 January 2026, it was announced that Ademola's funeral service would be held on 8 January at LTV 8 in Ikeja on 8 January. She was buried on 9 January 2026 at Yaba Cemetery in Lagos.

== Recognition ==
On 9 August 2026, to mark what would have been Ademola's 50th birthday, Rotimi Salami announced that he would be releasing a film based on her life, entitled Until My Last Breath (Titilailai).

== Filmography ==
- Láròdá òjò (2008) as Agbanimoran
- Eti Keta (2011) as Mama Adigun (also writer)
- Lagos Girls (2011) as Ebun
- Ifedolapo (2015) as Nurse Titi
- Aromimawe (2016) as Iya Feranmi
- Ireje (2016) as Mrs Folawiyo
- Gangan (2016) as Radeke
- Full House (2016) as Mama
- Omo Emi (2017) as Mummy Funmi
- Question Unanswered (2017) as Mrs Clara
- Jail (2017) as Agatha
- Tiwa's Baggage (2017) as Iyabo
- Ile Wa (2018) as Mama Kate (also writer and director)
- Dirty Dirtier (2018) as Mrs Shola
- Adebimpe Omo Oba (2019) as Olori
- Apeka (2021) as Mama Sinaayomi
- Mimi's Voice (2021) as Mrs Adetunji (also director)
- Eyan Ni Mi (2021) as Mama Twins
- Onika (2022) as Fadesewa
- Cookie Spot (2022) as Efe
- Murder at the Bar (2022) as Kebe
- Third Eye (2022) as Evelyn (also director)
- Badcop (2023) as Madam Nadia
- Shattered Innocence (2023) as Mummy Dele
- Ibro Ijaya (2025) as Iya Bose
- Àdùnní: Ògìdán Bìnrin (2025) as Sister Bola
