= Gbomo Gbomo Express =

2015 film

- Theatrical release poster
- Directed by: Walter "Waltbanger" Taylaur
- Written by: Walter Taylaur
- Story by: Scot Eritemu; Walter Taylaur
- Produced by: Jeffrey Taylaur; Kevin Taylaur; Walter Taylaur
- Starring: Ramsey Nouah; Osas Ighodaro; Blossom Chukwujekwu; Kiki Omeili; Alexx Ekubo; Gideon Okeke; Gbenro Ajibade; Ikechukwu Onunaku; Shafy Bello
- Cinematography: David Wyte
- Music by: TEC; Ikechukwu
- Production company: Waltbanger 101 Productions
- Distributed by: FilmOne Distribution
- Release date: 2 October 2015
- Running time: 98 minutes
- Country: Nigeria
- Language: English

Gbomo Gbomo Express is a 2015 Nigerian caper comedy film, written and directed by Walter Taylaur. It stars Ramsey Nouah, Osas Ighodaro, Blossom Chukwujekwu, Kiki Omeili, Alexx Ekubo, Gideon Okeke, Gbenro Ajibade, Ikechukwu Onunaku and Shaffy Bello. The film is a spin-off of Married to the Game, a television series, also directed by Walter Taylaur for EbonyLife TV.

The film is centred on the kidnapping of record label boss, Austin Mba (Ramsey Nouah) and a socialite he meets at the club, Cassandra (Osas Ighodaro). The situation gets complicated for the amateur kidnappers led by Francis (Gideon Okeke), who has to deal with keeping his girlfriend, Blessing (Kiki Omeili) and his crazy sidekick, Filo (Gbenro Ajibade), as they try to get Austin's partner, Rotimi (Blossom Chukwujekwu) to pay the ransom.

== Plot ==
Austin Mba is the CEO of Rolling Records, a label that's on the verge of signing a major sponsorship deal, brokered by his partner and company lawyer, Rotimi Lawal. A trio of inexperienced hustlers which consist of Francis, the leader of the gang, Filo and Blessing, intercept an e-mail about the Rolling Records sponsorship deal, which is supposedly worth ₦50 million; they then decide to kidnap one of the label owners for a ransom of the ₦50 million.

Austin, in a celebratory mood of the incoming deal, goes to party at the club where he meets a socialite, Cassandra and they hook up. Francis' gang strike this night and they kidnap Austin, along with Cassandra who is in his car, as he is about to go get a condom. Waking up at an uncompleted building in the morning, after being knocked out the previous night, Austin claims Cassandra as his girlfriend to the gang, so as to prevent the group from killing her. The gang calls Rotimi, the partner, who tries to explain to the gang that the money is not yet in the company's hands, and that Austin's signature is in fact needed for the contract before the fund can be released; this explanation fell on deaf ears. Rotimi suspects Nino, the flagship artist of the label, who also is very keen on the money, has a hand in the kidnap. Rotimi threatens Nino about getting the police involved, but Nino threatens to turn the story around to the police and claim that Rotimi connived with him to kidnap Austin.

Cassandra asks to use the toilet and Filo escorts her; in the absence of a guard, Austin breaks loose and heads to the toilet, where he hits Filo who's about to rape Cassandra at gun point. Austin and Cassandra both escape, but Cassandra is captured again after she tries to recover her expensive shoe that she left behind. Austin, as a result, surrenders himself to the gang and he is beaten to a pulp. To save Austin from further torture, Cassandra begs and implores the gang to call her step-mum, Alexis Osita-Park, for the ransom instead. Alex Osita-Park is a very wealthy woman worth $2.8 billion which she inherited from Cassandra's late father. The gang calls Osita-park and asks for the same 50 million. Osita-Park bargains to pay 30 million, but the group refuses. Cassandra, on the phone, begs her step mum to please give the money to the group; in the midst of the discussion, everyone realizes the 30 million Osita-Park is willing to pay is in dollars and not in Naira. The gang immediately agree to the offer and decide to arrange a meeting on the collection of the money.

Blessing is pregnant, but she keeps it away from her boyfriend, Francis, because she's been having an affair with Filo. Francis eventually finds out about Blessing's pregnancy and tries to force the truth out of her mouth about who is responsible, thinking she is still into prostitution business. Blessing refuses to confess, claiming it would escalate an already tense relationship. Francis then realizes it must be someone he knows and further insists to know the truth. Blessing eventually tells him, but not after she has revealed that she's also aware of Gideon's secret of infertility; she explains that she stayed with him all the while for the true love she has for him. Blessing rushes to Filo and urges him to run away, in order to avoid a physical battle with Francis. Filo, who has already connived with some other street guys to boycott the gang and take the ransom, arrives fully armed, along with the street guys, and they order Francis to bring out the money. Gideon however explains to them that the payment is electronically; a man from Filo's gang then orders Francis to call Alexis Osita-Park to initiate a change of plans, but Francis refuses to hand over his phone, and Blessing is accidentally killed by Filo. Francis, in retaliation also kills Filo; a gun battle ensues, and everyone else is killed in the process.

Five days later, Alexis Osita-Park tries to pay off Austin Mba on his hospital bed with ₦2 million naira, but he refuses. Cassandra enters the room to say her "final goodbye" and tells Austin that her mum insists she travels for several months and that she does not know where that leaves them. Austin also reveals that he in fact also intends to travel. Austin is seen by a taxi; he receives a credit alert on his phone about a $30 million transaction; he instructs the driver to head to Murtala Muhammed Airport. The film flashes back; apparently, Austin has been the mastermind behind the entire incident from the beginning, and the ransom has been paid into an account he controls. In the closing credits, Alexis Osita-Park has captured Rotimi Lawal and Nino, demanding from them her $30 million.

== Cast ==
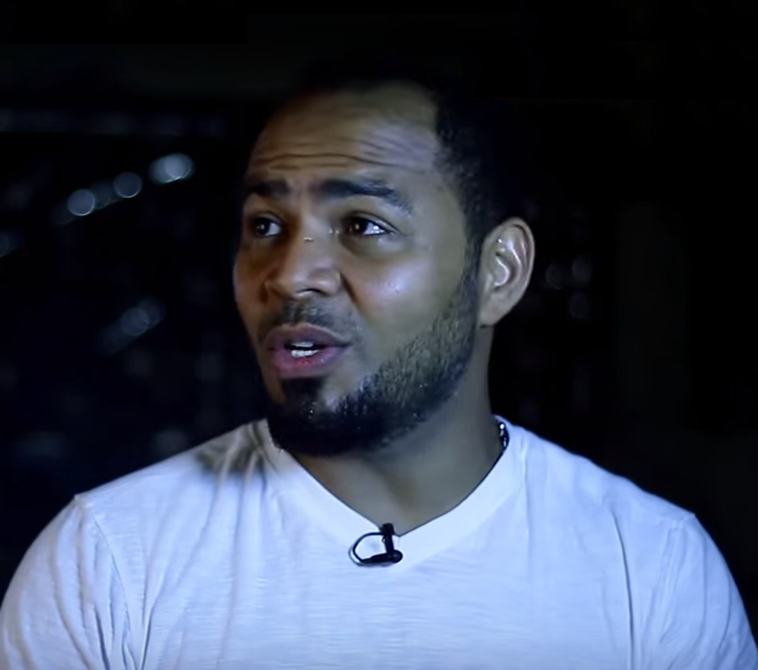
Ramsey Nouah on set of the film

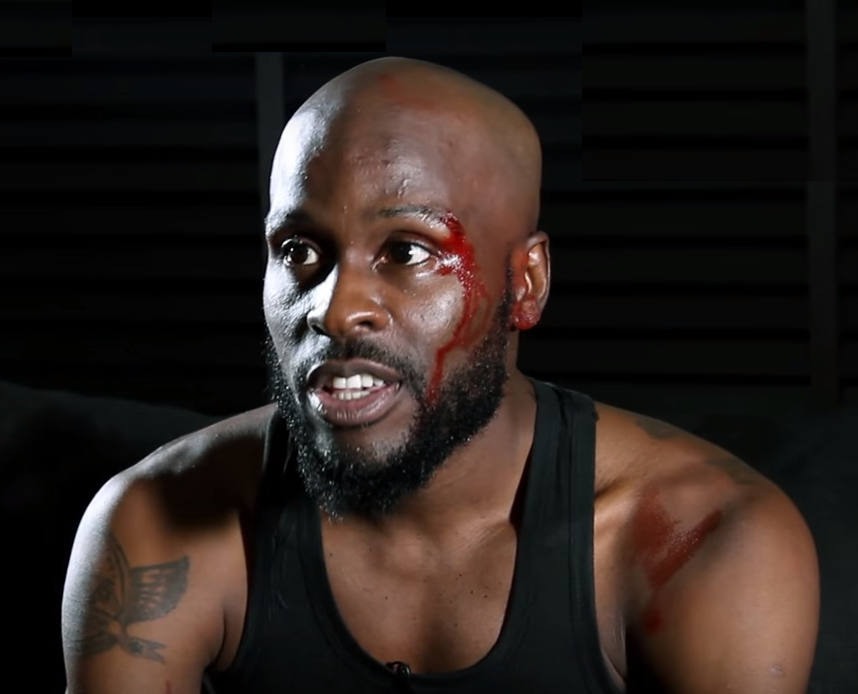
Ikechukwu during filming

- Ramsey Nouah as Austin Mba
- Blossom Chukwujekwu as Rotimi Lawal
- Osas Ighodaro as Cassandra
- Gideon Okeke as Francis
- Kiki Omeili as Blessing
- Gbenro Ajibade as Filo
- Ikechukwu Onunaku as Nino
- Alexx Ekubo as Hubby
- Shaffy Bello–Akinrimisi as Alexis Osita- Park
- Kenneth Okolie as Jealous Guy
- Omoye Uzamere as Nkem
- Niqua Johnson as Waitress / Miss Wannabe
- Shakar EL as Mobility
- Benny Thomas as Ghadaffi
- Gladys Tivkaa as Runz Girl
- Abayomi Lawore as Eskay

== Production ==
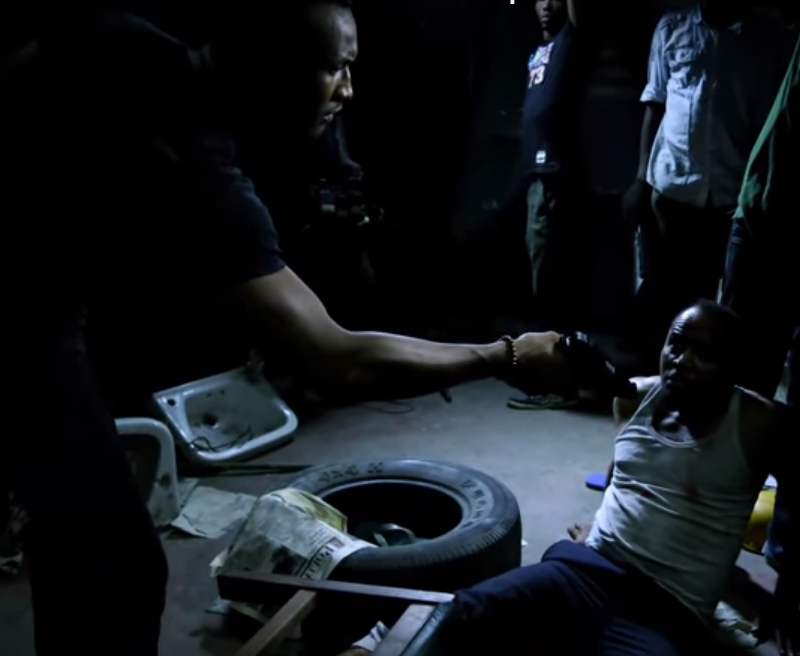
Behind the scenes of Gbomo Gbomo Express

Gbomo Gbomo Express is a spin-off of Married to the Game, a television series, also directed by Walter Taylaur for EbonyLife TV. The plot of the television show, Married to the Game, starts where that of Gbomo Gbomo Express is concluded. The kidnap idea came to the director, Taylaur, from real life recount of kidnap of a couple coming out of a night club. Sound Sultan and Lilian Esoro were meant to be cast in the film but were later dropped due to scheduling conflicts. Gbomo Gbomo Express is Osas Ighodaro and Gbenro Ajibade's first movie together, after their wedding.

The film was shot entirely in Lagos State. Principal photography, which was initially scheduled for 14 days, took 18 days. The nightclub and restaurant scenes were shot in Computer Village, Ikeja and Victoria Island, Lagos, among other locations. The kidnap scenes, which constitute the bulk of the film were shot on set in an abandoned building at Ebute Metta, Lagos. The building was also converted into a studio for the corporate scenes. A few of the other sets in the film were also built at this location. A major scene was supposed to be shot on the railway tracks in Ebuta Metta, the permission to shoot at the site was however later revoked.

Post-production for the film lasted three months. The film features songs by Yemi Alade, Ikechukwu, SDC, Shakar EL, Labzy Lawal, Ben Thomas, Thell'ma, Egar Boi, among others.

== Release ==
A teaser trailer for Gbomo Gbomo Express was released on 30 June 2015. Behind-the-scenes pictures of the film was released online in July through August 2015. The official trailer for Gbomo Gbomo Express was released on 2 September 2015. It had its premiere screening on 27 September 2015, and it started showing in selected cinemas across Nigeria on 2 October 2015.

== Critical reception ==
The Movie Pencil comments: "Gbomo Gbomo Express is not the best Nollywood movie ever made. It is the Nollywood movie that has done one of the best jobs of synchronizing a worthwhile plot with awesome acting, top notch technical delivery and a soundtrack that brings every scene to life".
