= The Party (TV series) =

2025 Nigerian three-part murder mystery series

- Genre: Murder mystery
- Written by: Stephen Okonkwon
- Directed by: Yemi Filmboy Morafa
- Starring: Kunle Remi; Kehinde Bankole; Shaffy Bello; Bimbo Manuel; Ayoola Ayolola; Femi Branch; Yomi Fash Lanso; Mide Martins; Kelechi Udegbe; Uzor Arukwe
- Country of origin: Nigeria
- No. of series: 1
- No. of episodes: 3

Production
- Executive producers: Ope Ajayi; Ebele Enunwa; The Jewel Aeida; Shileola Ibironke
- Producers: Ope Ajayi; Judith Audu
- Cinematography: Johnathan Kovel
- Editor: Adekunle Bryan Oyetunde

Original release
- Network: Netflix
- Release: 30 May 2025

The Party is a 2025 Nigerian three-part murder mystery series, executive produced by Ope Ajayi and directed by Yemi "Filmboy" Morafa. It features an ensemble cast including Kunle Remi, Kehinde Bankole, Shaffy Bello, Uzor Arukwe, Ayoola Ayolola, and Segun Arinze. The series explores the circumstances surrounding a young man's death, leaving the audience to question whether it was a calculated act or an act of God.

The Party enjoyed a successful release across Africa, engaging audiences with its compelling narrative. It quickly rose to the number one position on Netflix Nigeria within the first 24 hours of its release and maintained that ranking for three weeks. The series also received significant attention in Kenya, where it reached the number one spot, and in South Africa, where it ranked within the top three.

== Synopsis ==
Everyone is a suspect when a young, successful, newly married man who works for a multinational company dies an unexpected death. Was he poisoned by his new bride? His mother-in-law, who never supported the marriage? His colleagues, who were envious of his position? His neighbor, whose wife he was having an affair with? Or was it an act of God?

A police investigation uncovers long buried family secrets and shocking gossip that reveals his life was never so perfect after all.

== Cast ==
- Kunle Remi
- Kehinde Bankole
- Shaffy Bello
- Bimbo Manuel
- Ayoola Ayolola
- Femi Branch
- Yomi Fash - Lanso
- Mide Martins
- Kelechi Udegbe
- Uzor Arukwe
- James Gardiner
- Tope Olowoniyan
- Ben Touitou
- Eva Ibiam
- Chukwuka Jude
- Ray Adeka
- Amaka Uzokwe
- Segun Arinze

== Episodes ==
No.	Title	Directed by	Written by	Original release date
1	Episode 1	Yemi "Filmboy" Morafa	Stephen Okonkwo	30 May 2025
Devastated by Bobo's death, his friends and family try to piece together his final moments as the detectives investigating the case search for answers.
2	Episode 2	Yemi "Filmboy" Morafa	Stephen Okonkwo	30 May 2025
While party goers deny involvement in Bobo's death, witness statement reveals an argument before the celebration that may be key to the investigation.
3	Episode 3	Yemi "Filmboy" Morafa	Stephen Okonkwo	30 May 2025
Police make an arrest, but they're forced to reconsider whether they have the right person in custody when they discover that a witness was lying.
