= Tough Love (2017 film) =

- Release poster on Irokotv
- Directed by: Biodun Stephen
- Written by: Ozioma B. Nwughala
- Produced by: Mary Njoku; Biodun Stephen
- Starring: Bolaji Ogunmola; Vivian Metchie; Joshua Richard; Tomiwa Sage
- Production company: Shutterspeed Projects
- Distributed by: Irokotv
- Release date: 2017
- Country: Nigeria

Tough Love is a 2017 Nigerian romantic drama film, produced and directed by Biodun Stephen.

The film tells a story of a United States returnee, Obaoluwa who is tricked into returning to his hometown in Abeokuta by his mother to seek alternative ways of keeping him away from substance abuse. Despite having difficulty adapting to his new life, the firm approach of his grandmum, and the continued love from a farm girl, Monike ensured he gradually changed his way of life.

== Cast ==
- Bolaji Ogunmola as Monike
- Joshua Richard as Obaloluwa
- Lawal Solomon as Femi
- Blessing Jessica Obasi
- Vivian Metchie as Iya Ola
- Tomiwa Sage as Eze
- Biodun Stephen as Ireti
- Faith Pius as Ajoke

== Reception ==
It got a 3/5 rating from Nollywood Reinvented, who praised the performance of Vivian Metchie, but criticized the lack of chemistry and display of love progression between Joshua Richard and Bolaji Ogunmola. It also questioned the position of the makers of the film on human rights for justifying the relinquishment of rights to freedom of movement and the use of domestic corporal punishment for an adult. True Nollywood Stories captioned its review "Tough Love" is a simple, well-told story that will move your heart. However, it noted that there were many unnecessary scenes in the film and the character buildup was not convincing. It praised the music and the acting of the main characters.

== Release ==
In June 2018, YNaija announced that the film is set for release on video streaming platform, Irokotv.
