= Riona =

Nigerian period drama

- Genre: Period Drama
- Written by: Ifeanyi Barbara Chidi
- Directed by: James Omokwe
- Starring: Frank Konwea; Elvina Ibru; Mimi Chaka
- Country of origin: Nigeria
- No. of seasons: 1
- No. of episodes: 260

Production
- Executive producer: James Omokwe
- Producer: Jemila Akinwale
- Editor: Jessica A.
- Running time: 30 minutes
- Production company: Feemo

Original release
- Network: Africa Magic
- Release: 28 September 2020 – 24 September 2021

Riona (Riy-OW-Naa) is an Africa Magic original period drama set in a 12th-century Itsekiri kingdom. It was directed by James Omokwe. It stars Big Brother Naija season 1 housemate, Frank Konwea, Elvina Ibru, Najite Dede and Mimi Chaka. It premiered on September 28, 2020. It airs on DStv channel 151 and streams on Showmax.

== Plot summary ==
The kingdom of Oyomere is under siege when a prophecy about a child born under the rising of a dark moon is coming to destroy King Ofotokun and bring his reign to an end. This unsettles King Ofotokun and he orders the killing of children born under the dark moon to avert the prophecy, but four of the targeted children survive. Of the four, Tsema and Aghan (Ofotokun's heir) cross paths by chance, and as they are children born under the dark moon they are destined to bring down Ofotokun's dictatorship. Riona also tells the story of social classes; The highborn Omajaja and the low born Irale and their struggles for freedom.

== Cast and characters ==
=== Main characters ===
- Frank Konwea as King Ofotonku, a wicked king who crushes anyone who stands in his way, He will do anything to rule forever and he dares to fight the gods when they pronounce harsh judgments upon him. The king loses his temper when he hears about the prophecy. He unwittingly kills his favorite wife, Oniyemofe, in order to save his own life.
- Mimi Chaka as Oniyemofe 'Mofe', King Ofotonku's fourth and favourite wife – the one he married for love. Mofe knows her position in the king's life and carries herself with pride especially as the mother of the heir to the throne.
- Soibifaa Dokubo as Omereyon, King Ofotonku's most loyal friend who was attached to the king as a young boy. He knows how to handle the King diplomatically.
- Amarachukwu Onoh as Prince Atseaghan 'Aghan', is the future king of Oyomere. As the heir to the throne, he learns about his role in the kingdom at a tender age. Aghan despises his father's oppressive leadership and strives to replace it with democracy. He has to sacrifice his relationship with his father and many other people to make his dreams come true.
- Jasmine Olarotimi (young) and Maggie Isibor (older) as Oritsemaye 'Tsema', was raised by Aso, a virtuous Irale man despite being highborn. She is raised to lead the rebellion against the monarchy. She is King Ofotonku's worst enemy because she is destined to free the Irale from bondage. Tsema knows her value, and was raised to voice her opinions without fear. A trait that gets her into trouble when Prince Aghan visits the Irale community.
- Elvina Ibru as Atigbiolaoye, a shapeshifting witch who resides in the forest of Oyomere and plays a part in ensuring the fulfilment of the prophecy.
- Onajite Dede as Arenyeka who is also known as the Oparunmale, the mouthpiece of the gods. She is the first female Oparunmale in Oyomere. She informed King Ofotonku about the looming dark moon and its consequences.
- Thelma Nwosu as Queen Idolor, Ofotonku's first wife and a member of the high council.
- Mena Sodje as Misan / Queen Misan
- Olarotimi Fakunle as Aso

=== Supporting characters ===
- Faith Stanley (younger) and Uche Chika Elumelu (older) as Arubi
- Ginikachukwu Tagbo (younger) and Eric Didie (Older) as Edomi
- Chukwuebuka Ude (Younger) and Casey Edema (Older) as Abugewa
- Jeff Nweke as Toghanro
- Jide Alabi as Chief Ofoeyeno
- Tope Olowoniyan as Queen Abieyuwa
- Chukwu Martin as Agbeyegbe (the god)
- Steph Isuma as Queen Arioma
- Leo Oji as Tsegboritse
- Deborah Nwaohiri as Roli
- Preach Bassey as Amaju

== Production and release ==
Riona is set in pre-colonial times of the Itsekiri Kingdom around the 12th century. The Itsekiri people live in the westernmost part of the Niger Delta bounded by the Bight of Benin on the west.

It was listed as one of the top 5 Nigerian TV series of 2020.

== Awards and nominations ==
Year	Award	Category	Recipient	Result	Ref
2022	Africa Magic Viewers' Choice Awards	Best Africa Magic Original Drama Series	James Omokwe	Nominated	

== See also ==
- Itsekiri people
