= Layole Oyatogun =

Nigerian actress

- Education: University of Lagos
- Occupations: Broadcaster, actress, TV presenter
- Years active: 2007-present

Layole Oyatogun is a Nigerian broadcaster, actress, compere and public relations manager. She is the daughter of late veteran broadcaster Walter Oyatogun.

== Career ==
Layole started her career co-presenting an entertainment show called "Star Dust" with her younger sister Mode Oyatogun on MITV. She moved to Silverbird Television in 2007 where she worked as a presenter and producer. During her time at Silverbird Television, she anchored and produced the Cadbury Breakfast TV show, Page 3 and MBGN Diary. Layole is also a Red-carpet host. She has hosted Fashion and award red carpet events including; Mercedes Benz Fashion Week in Johannesburg, Pretoria, and New York. Arise Fashion Week Nigeria, Lagos Fashion and Design Week, Africa Movie Academy Awards AMAA. In 2011 she was the red carpet host at the inaugural ball of President Goodluck Jonathan and Vice-president Namani Sambo in Aso-villa. She has also hosted events such as; The Most Beautiful Girl in Nigeria Pageant (MBGN), Eloy Awards, Africa International Fashion Week, Nigeria's Next Super Model, City People Awards for Excellence, Africa Fashion Week Nigeria, Green October Event. In 2023, Layole launched her own TV show which she called Layole’s Lounge.

== Filmography ==
- 30 Days (2006)
- Unconditional
- Mr. and Mrs. Johnson (2015)
- Pepper soup (2016)
- Trapped
- The Inn (2016) as Frances Bamidele
- Whose Meal Ticket (2017)
- Our Dirty Little Secrets (2017)
- The Spell (2018)
- Along Bothering Lines (2018) as Tinuke
- Tailor My Heart (2018) as Ola
- Mad about you (2019) as Kathy
- Double Strings (2020) as Benue
- When Stars Cross (2021) as Uche
- Jaguna's Heart (2021)
