= Sobi's Mystic =

- Directed by: Biodun Stephen
- Written by: Biodun Stephen
- Starring: Bolaji Ogunmola; Kunle Remi; Mofe Duncan
- Production company: ShutterSpeed Projects
- Release date: April 2, 2017
- Country: Nigeria

Sobi's Mystic is a 2017 Nigerian romantic drama film, written, produced and directed by Biodun Stephen.

Sobi is a promiscuous man, who usually has his way with every woman he encounters. He got attracted to a strange lady, simply known to him as Mystic at a night club. After a series of sexual encounters with her, he developed feelings for her, which she didn't reciprocate and eventually broke up with him. This got him interested in knowing more about her. A twist to the plot is revealed, when Sobi discovered that Mystic has another life.

== Cast ==
- Bolaji Ogunmola as Aida/Mystic
- Kunle Remi as Sobi
- Mofe Duncan as Fowe
- Feranmi Oladigbo as Chuwy
- Comfort Otopka as Sobi's Babe
- Iyinoluwa Oladigbo as Fiyin
- Emem Ufot as Dafe
- David Uzoma as House Guard
- Casmir Chibuike as Bartender

== Reception ==
It received a 4/5 rating from Nollywood Reinvented, who praised the originality, unpredictability of the plots and adherence to detail in the film. In its review, the film was praised for allowing the audience to have various theories on how the story will play out, but eventually going in another direction. The film was also cited as an evidence then when the filmmaker (Biodun Stephen) functions in multiple role in the crew, it usually turn out a properly done film. On True Nollywood Stories, it was praised for its originality, thoroughness, musical performances and good sound, while the reviewer noted that the film will keep audience speculating on its outcome, it reflected that the climax wasn't worth it. It praised Ogunmola's acting as Aida, but criticized the concurrent role as "Mystic", describing it as "too hard to be sexy, slurs her words, squints her eyes, moves slowly and portrays herself in a manner that seems forced". Sobi was also noted to have portrayed his "playboy" persona well, but his transition into being in love was tagged "unrealistic". It got a 55% rating with the reviewer concluding that "Sobi’s Mystic combines good music, fair acts, an imaginative story and a disappointing resolution, and winds up an average film". ·Daniel Okechukwu in its review praised the soundtrack and storyline.
