= Ezra (2007 film) =

- Directed by: Newton I. Aduaka
- Written by: Newton I. Aduaka; Alain-Michel Blanc
- Screenplay by: Newton Aduaka, Alain-Michel Blanc
- Produced by: Gorune Aprikian; Michel Loro; Cinefacto, Arte France
- Starring: Mamoudu Turay Kamara
- Cinematography: Carlos Arango de Montis
- Edited by: Sebastien Touta
- Music by: Nicolas Baby
- Distributed by: California Newsreel (US)
- Release date: January 23, 2007
- Running time: 103'
- Countries: Austria; Belgium; France; Nigeria
- Language: English
- Budget: €1.6 million

Ezra is a 2007 drama film directed by Newton I. Aduaka. It was shown at the 2007 Sundance Film Festival and the 2007 Ouagadougou Panafrican Film and Television Festival where it won the Grand Prize.

== Synopsis ==
Ezra, a young Sierra Leonean ex-fighter, is struggling to find his bearings and return to a normal life after the civil war that laid waste his country. His everyday life is divided between a psychological rehabilitation centre and a national reconciliation tribunal organized under the auspices of the UNO. During the rehabilitation trial in which Ezra takes part, he has to face his sister who is accusing him of the murder of their parents. But Ezra does not remember a thing. Will Ezra admit this horror and thus be forgiven by his sister and his village community?

== Cast ==
- Mamoudu Turay Kamara as Ezra
- Augustine Maturi as Young Ezra
- Abubakarr Sawaneh as Mitschach
- Malcom Smith as Young Mitschach
- Mariame N'Diaye as Onitcha
- Mamusu Kallon as Mariam
- Merveille Lukeba as Moses
- Richard Gant as Mac Mondale
- Mercy Ojelade as Cynthia
- Emile Abossolo M'Bo

== See also ==
- List of Nigerian films of 2007
