= Ifeoma Fafunwa =

Nigerian-American theatre director, playwright, and activist

- Born: Lagos Island, Nigeria
- Education: University of Massachusetts, Amherst, Harvard University's Radcliffe Institute, Dorsey Studios for the Performing Arts, University of Southern California
- Occupations: Theatre Maker, Creative Director, Playwright
- Notable work: HEAR WORD!
- Spouse: Tani Fafunwa(2001)
- Children: 4
- Parents: Walter Obianwu (father); Carol Obianwu (mother)
- Website: www.iopeneye.org

Ifeoma Fáfúnwá is a theatre director, playwright, artist, and activist, living and working in Lagos, Nigeria. Her creative activism targets inequality and the empowerment of women, youth and girls. She is the founder and creative director of iOpenEye Africa Foundation; a Nigerian non-profit organization, focused on using performance art to drive social change.

Her play, HEAR WORD!, which she directed and co-wrote, has been seen by over 120,000 live audience members across the world. She was listed as one of the "12 Artists who changed the world in 2019." Ifeoma’s activist work is featured in the award-winning documentary film titled MrsF (on Al Jazeera).

== Biography ==
Ifeoma was born in Lagos, Nigeria to Carol Obianwu, a physics teacher who was the vice principal of St. Gregory’s College, and Walter Obianwu, an internationally competitive tennis player. She attended St. Mary’s Primary School, Lagos, and Holy Child College, Obalende. At 17 she moved to the US for university. After graduation she worked for several years as an interior architecture designer in Atlanta and as a Creative Director at an advertising agency in Denver. Colorado. She then moved to Los Angeles to be closer to Film, Theatre, and Television.

She has a Bachelor's degree from the University of Massachusetts at Amherst (1987) and she took courses at the Dorsey Studios for the Performing Arts and The University of Southern California. She is also a fellow of Harvard University’s Radcliffe Institute and the Aspen Institute, as well as a director’s fellow of the MIT Media lab.

In 2001, Ifeoma married Tani Fáfúnwá the son of Aliyu Babátúndé Fáfúnwá, and in 2003 she returned to Nigeria where she currently lives and works. Ifeoma and Tani have four children.

== Art and work ==
Ifeoma describes herself as a social-impact theatre maker, artist and activist. She writes, directs, and produces socially transformative plays. She also facilitates pro-bono acting and storytelling workshops. She serves as Chief Creative Officer at iOpenEye Africa Foundation.

Her most notable play HEAR WORD! is a collection of monologues based on true-life stories of the struggles for equality of Nigerian women. It debuted in 2004 and has been described by the Boston Globe as "a call for female solidarity and empowerment". Ben Brantley of the New York Times wrote that "the brightness radiating from its all-female cast has the glare and heat of a raging bonfire." Sahara Reporters pronounces it as "deeply entertaining as it is profoundly philosophical." HEAR WORD! was performed in English, Nigerian English, Pidgin and local languages. It was the first Nigerian play to stage at the American Repertory Theatre and it was the first Nigerian play to be curated by the Edinburgh International Festival team.

Some of Ifeoma Fafunwa’s earlier directing, producing, and writing work includes Eggs & Fleas by Blue Sphere Alliance, Sefi Atta’s plays, Bigger & Better and The Engagement, Digging for Gold produced by Lufodo, 100 Million Vagabonds, and Love & Recession. She also directed one of Nigeria’s cultural submissions for the London 2012 Olympics, and her work has been featured at the Lagos Theater Festival, the Tate Modern and London’s International Festival of Theatre (LIFT)

== iOpenEye Africa Foundation ==
In 2014, Ifeoma founded iOpenEye, a Nigerian Production Company that produces socially impactful theater, provides pro bono acting training and facilitates open dialogue events. To focus the organization’s impact work, iOpenEye Africa Foundation opened in 2019.

== Awards and recognition ==
- 2023 - Cultures of Resistance Honoree
- 2020 - McNulty Foundation Catalyst Prize
- 2019 - 12 Artists Who Changed the World
- 2019 - MIT Media Lab Director’s Fellow
- 2018 - Access Bank -100 Most Influential Women in Nigeria
- 2017 - Harvard University’s Radcliffe Fellow
- 2014 - Aspen Institute Global Leadership Fellow
- 2013 - Africa Leadership Initiative West Africa Fellow
