= Kehinde Olorunyomi =

Nigerian actress (born 1981)

- Born: 13 January 1981 (age 45); Nigeria
- Occupations: Actress; filmmaker; screenwriter
- Years active: 2001–present
- Notable work: Bachelor's Eve
- Spouse: Adewunmi Odukoya

Kehinde Olorunyomi (born 13 January 1981) is a Nigerian actress, filmmaker and screenwriter, notable for her role in the defunct soap opera DOMINO and several screenplays.

== Career ==
=== Acting ===
Olorunyomi started her acting career in 2001, with the television program Everyday people. She is remembered for her role in the defunct soap opera Domino, where she played Stella Lord-Williams, the wife of the lead character, Oscar (played by Femi Branch).

In March 2017, Olorunyomi joined the cast of the TV series Tinsel, where she plays the character Tomiwa Ajayi.

Olorunyomi has featured in movies like The Novelist, Couple's Award, Divorce not allowed, Bachelor's eve, Bloodlines season 1, Forever Within Us,

=== Screenwriting ===
As a screen writer, Olorunyomi started her career in 2006 with the movie Mamush. She has written over 50 titles that have been produced into movies and series. Olorunyomi has written for Nigerian film makers and production companies like M-Net Africa’s AMOF (Africa Magic Original Films), Desmond Elliot, Uche Jombo, Ayo Adesanya, Bimbo Akintola, Charles Okafor, Ego Boyo, Ramsey Nuoah and Mike Ezuruonye.

Olorunyomi is CEO of Nextlevel Cinema, a film production company she started in 2012. Nextlevel Cinema has produced five movies The Perfect Plan (2012), Forever Within Us (2014), One Moment in Time (2014), The Novelist (2015), Tesho (2016). The Novelist was in the Nigerian Cinemas in 2016 and showed great potentials, it also has great reviews online. Couple's Award

Olorunyomi won the Ghana Movie Awards (GMA) in 2012 for best original screenplay for the motion picture titled In the Cupboard produced by Desmond Elliot. Recent films under Olorunyomi’s purview include Husbands of Lagos Season 1 (2014) for Irokotv, Missing Steps (2016) written for Switzerland/Nigerian government produced by Charles Okafor, Oge’s Sister produced by Uche Jombo, Oju Anu Produced by Ayo Adesanya, The Patient produced by M-Net Africa. In addition to Olorunyomi receiving the Best screenplay award in 2012, Finding Mercy one of her original screenplays received 2014 Africa Magic Viewers Choice Awards for Best Supporting Actor.

=== Directing ===
Couple's Award is Olorunyomi's directorial debut, she featured in it and was also the screenwriter. Couple's award got critical acclaim and mentions by movie critics in Nigeria

== Personal life ==
Olorunyomi is married to Adewunmi Odukoya who is chief operating officer/aggregator for Nextlevel Cinema. They have a son who was born in 2013.

== Filmography ==
Bachelor's Eve
