= London Academy of Performing Arts =

London Academy of Performing Arts (LAPA) was a drama school, which specialised in a classical acting training. It operated from the early 1980s to 2005. It was based in two areas of London during its history – Fulham and Bayswater. Its founder and Principal was Cecilia Hocking, along with other former RADA staff.

== Curriculum ==
The core acting skills of voice, text and movement, were taught across the training, with regular staged, productions. The curriculum included Shakespeare's plays, wider English Renaissance theatre, Greek tragedy, Restoration comedy, French Neo-Classicism, Commedia dell'Arte, 18thC, 19thC and Twentieth-century theatre. Writers whose material was used regularly included Anton Chekhov, Henrik Ibsen, George Bernard Shaw, Oscar Wilde, Noël Coward, Arthur Miller, Jean Genet, Samuel Beckett, Tennessee Williams and Caryl Churchill.

== Staff ==
Many teachers, actors and directors worked at LAPA over its lifetime. Some were regulars and some were brought in for specific projects. They included;-

- Rachel Preece
- Kay Adshead
- Juliet Aykroyd
- Hanne Holten
- June Kemp, acclaimed movement specialist who had worked with Sigurd Leeder and former Head of Movement at RADA
- Michael Latimer
- David Perry, Former Head of Shakespeare at RADA
- Shevaun Wilder
- Warren Wills
- Madeline Cannon
- Paul Garrington
- Philip Grout
- Daniel Wozinack

== Alumni ==
Former students of LAPA have gone on to pursue a wide variety of careers across the globe.

Here is a selection of alumni:

Pascale Aebischer, Lauren Booth, Norman Bowman, Pooja Ghai, Drew Goodall, Laura Harring, Elvina Ibru, Abbas Kazerooni, Yunjin Kim, Alex McSweeney, Grant Neal, Joris Putman, Tempest Rose, Edward Rowe (The Kernow King), Raz Shaw, Chris Simmons, Jon Trenchard, and Emily Yarrow and Christopher Patrick Nolan (Rogue One)

== Use of the same name ==
Some years after LAPA closed, another organisation was set up using the same name. There is no connection between the two schools.
