= Gingerrr =

2025 Nigerian action comedy film

Gingerrr is a 2025 Nigerian action comedy film written by Xavier Ighorodje and executive produced by Ope Ajayi, Bukunmi Adeaga-ilori, Bisola Aiyeola, Wumi Toriola, Bolaji Ogunmola and Creative catalyst.

Gingerrr was co- produced by Onyeka Nnama under the umbrella of COTS Production.

The movie tells the story of four friends with a common goal and fate, who embark on a bold heist to transform their lives. They were desperate to escape their past and banded together to complete the dangerous task. The movie features Nollywood cast like Bisola Aiyeola, Bolaji Ogunmola, Bukunmi Adeaga-Ilori, Wumi Toriola, Timini Egbuson, Odunlade Adekola, Lateef Adedimeji.

== Synopsis ==
When a high-stake heist becomes their only hope of escape from the life, they know to the life they want, four women with nothing to lose, brought together by fate, must take a stand! Bound by a shared vendetta, they join forces to pull off a daring heist, but their alliance is tested when each one reveals a hidden agenda to betray the others.

== Box office ==
Gingerrr premiered on the 21 September 2025 in Lagos and Lekki, and was released on cinema on 26 September 2025. In its opening weekend, it had a box office of N82 million naira. Within 5 weeks of its theatrical release, it amassed N378 million naira, securing the tenth highest grossing Nigerian films. The film also premiered in London on 1 November 2025. At the end of its theatrical run of about 11 weeks, Gingerrr had amassed a total of N522.8 million naira.

== Cast ==
- Bisola Aiyeola
- Bolaji Ogunmola
- Bukunmi Adeaga-ilori
- Wumi Toriola
- Timini Egbuson
- Odunlade Adekola
- Lateef Adedimeji
- Shaffy Bello
- Blossom Chukwujekwu
- Mr Macaroni
