= False Flag (film) =

- Directed by: Allwell Ademola
- Written by: Toyosi Fasae
- Produced by: Allwell Ademola
- Starring: Gabriel Afolayan; Aisha Lawal; Wumi Toriola
- Production companies: All well & company
- Release date: 2017
- Running time: 93 minutes
- Country: Nigeria
- Language: English

False Flag is a 2017 Nigerian movie produced and directed by Allwell Ademola.

== Plot ==
A man who refuses to get married, later finds love in a woman who is HIV positive. The family of the man are unhappy with the relationship and they want him to call-off the relationship.

== Cast ==
- Gabriel Afolayan
- Aisha Lawal
- Wumi Toriola
- Allwell Ademola

== Awards and nominations ==
Year	Award	Category	Result	Ref
2017	Best of Nollywood Awards	Best Actor in a Lead role –Yoruba	Nominated	
2017	Best of Nollywood Awards	Best Actress in a Lead role –Yoruba	Nominated	
2017	Best of Nollywood Awards	Best Movie with Social message	Nominated	
