= Rage (1999 film) =

- Theatrical release poster
- Directed by: Newton Aduaka
- Written by: Newton Aduaka
- Screenplay by: Newton Aduaka
- Produced by: Newton Aduaka; Maria-Elena L'Abbate
- Starring: Fraser Ayres; Shaun Parkes; John Pickard
- Cinematography: Carlos Arango de Montis; Stuart Gosling
- Edited by: Marcela Cuneo
- Production company: Granite FilmWorks
- Distributed by: Metrodome Distribution Ltd
- Release dates: 16 September 1999 (TIFF); 6 November 1999 (LFF)
- Running time: 97 minutes
- Country: United Kingdom
- Language: English

Rage is a 1999 feature film directed and written by Nigerian-born Newton Aduaka. Rage is his debut feature. Fraser Ayres stars as Jamie, also known as Rage, a mixed-race, angry youth living on a grim council estate in South London. He is part of a rap trio with his two friends Godwin (Shaun Parkes) and Thomas (John Pickard). Looking to escape through their music, they turn to crime in order to finance making a record.

The first draft of the script was written in four days in 1996 by Aduaka. Although it had received some interest, it was only after the success of Aduaka's short On the Edge at the Cannes Film Festival in 1998 that making the film became a possibility. It nearly failed during principal photography due to the main finance being pulled just before filming began in September 1998.

Rage premiered at the Toronto International Film Festival in September 1999 and got its UK premiere at the London Film Festival in November of the same year. The distribution rights were picked up by Metrodome Distribution and, after the film was recut to a shorter length, received its full theatrical release in January 2001.

== Plot ==
Jamie, also known as Rage, is an angry young man of mixed race, who lives in Peckham, South London. He is part of a rap trio with Godwin ("G") and Thomas ("T"). In order to make a record, they need to get hold of £4000. Rage works as a shelf stacker. G is a pianist from a respectable black family. T is white and his parents are wealthy but his money is tied up in a trust.

Rage plans to finance the record by burgling T's parents' house. G hates the plan but goes along with Rage anyway. However, they find T's parents at home and the police catch the two young men: Rage is beaten up and possibly raped. T's parents drop the charges.

When G starts dating Lola, Rage is angry and G leaves the group. T also leaves after Rage assaults a racist policeman.

== Cast ==
- Fraser Ayres as Jamie 'Rage'
- Shaun Parkes as Godwin 'G'
- John Pickard as Thomas 'T'
- Shango Baku as Marcus
- Wale Ojo as Pin
- Alison Rose as Ellen

== Themes ==
Jamie gets his nickname Rage from his simmering anger and a tendency to erupt. He shares similarities with the alienated black male characters in films such as Horace Ové's Pressure and Franco Rosso's Babylon. Unlike these, however, he is of mixed race, which throws up issues of identity. While Jamie seeks escape into a life of music from a bad job and criminal neighbours, Thomas tries to get away from his white middle-class background and G struggles with cool and uncool versions of his future in music. The shared identity of belonging to a trio is absurd in the context of their individual differences.

== Production ==
Rage is the debut feature of Newton Aduaka, the Nigerian-born film writer and director. The film was produced by Granite FilmWorks, the production company set up by Aduaka and Maria Elena L'Abbate to make independent films, the first of which was the critically acclaimed short On the Edge.

Aduaka wrote the script for Rage in 1996. The first draft took four days to write all 120 pages.

Shooting began on 7 September 1998. Four days earlier, the principal financier behind the film decided to pull out, meaning that much of the 40-strong film crew had to be let go before the shoot had begun. The shoot lasted ten days, 16 hours a day but with only a little money coming in, the production remained under pressure. The complexity of the shoot was increased by the ambition of the project. It was filmed in around 40 locations, with three jazz club set pieces including 20 musicians, and a scene involving 150 extras in one of the most unstable council estates in London. Almost the whole film is set at night.

At the end of the tenth day of principal photography, the line producer resigned. Aduaka and his co-producer called a meeting of the crew at which the cameraman, art director, costume designer sound recordist and actors agreed to continue. However, production broke down and it was necessary to raise fresh finance and hire new equipment. A member of the crew and one of the lead actors decided to invest. Ten days later, shooting recommenced and continued until 20 October, when principal photography was completed.

== Soundtrack ==
The soundtrack is largely drawn from semi-underground labels such as Mumagi Music Productions, Jazz Fudge and Ninja Tune.

== Release ==
Rage was selected to be screened during the Cannes Film Festival as part of the Noir-Black-Negra film strand. However, the film was not ready in time. Instead, the film premiered on 16 September 1999 at the Toronto International Film Festival, where On the Edge had screened the year before. It had two sold-out screenings and the production received approaches from two Hollywood studios.

The film then had its UK premiere on 6 November at the London Film Festival to three sold-out audiences, and Aduaka reached a distribution agreement.

Rage was the first independent film by a black filmmaker to have a national release in the UK.

== Critical response ==
The film is credited with as one of the best British films of 1999, according to Gareth Wigmore in Film Review. It is "harsh and raw", combining jerky visuals, with a good script and realistic performances. The relationship between the trio and its disintegration is convincing throughout. Ayres displays both the toughness and vulnerability of Jamie's character.

Onyekachi Wambu writing in Screenonline sees it as "sensitive, downbeat and unglamorous", which comes to a "quiet lyrical resolution", while Mark Sinker in Sight & Sound describes Rage as a tough little film which contrasts the "perfectly crafted, disengaged, neo-bohemian intelligence" of the soundtrack with the "lumpy passion" of Jamie, as portrayed by Fraser Ayres.

However, Derek Elley in Variety found that Rage was "overlong" and "relentlessly grungy", saying that its view of black-white racial tension was old-fashioned by the standards of the late 1990s, while characterisation was limited to four-letter expletives. The performances were said to be full-on by the three leads; the lensing, raw; and the soundtrack, very basic. Mark Dinning in Empire gave the film two stars, saying that it culminated in an "array of two-dimensional caricatures." However, Aduaka's direction showed promise.

== Accolades ==
- Best Director, Pan African Film Festival
