= Funmi Martins =

Nigerian actress (1963–2002)

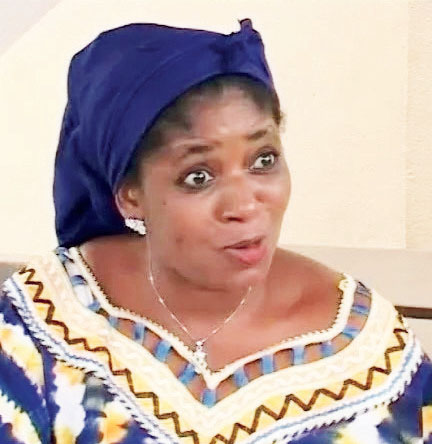
- Born: 1963; Ilesa, Osun State, Nigeria
- Died: 2002 (aged 38–39); Iju, Ogun
- Occupation: Actress
- Family: Mide Martins

Funmi Martins was a Nigerian actress and a model. She was the mother of Mide Martins and Damilare Peters. She was known for her roles in Eto Mi, Pelumi, Ija Omode and many others.

== Early life ==
Funmi Martins (born Oluwafunmilayo Florence Anike Oguntomi Martins) was born in September, 1963 in Ilesa, Osun State. She lived most of her life in Lagos and Ibadan.

== Career ==
Funmi Martins started her career as a model. She debuted her acting career under the tutelage of Adebayo Salami in a 1993 movie called Nemesis and Not My Will by Filmmaker Fidelis Duker. After then, she featured in different movies until her death in 2002.

== Death ==
Funmi Martins died of a cardiac arrest on 6 May 2002 at the age of 38 years.
