= Ayoola Ayolola =

Nigerian musician and actor (born 1987)

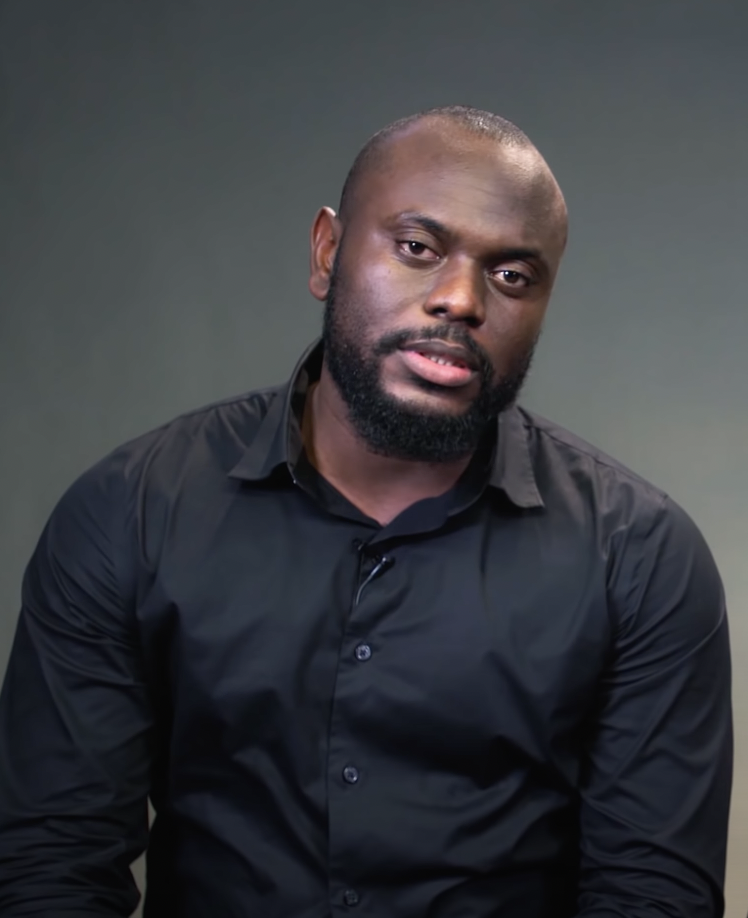
- Born: January 12, 1987 (age 39); Kano, Nigeria
- Education: Covenant University
- Occupations: Media personality, singer, actor

Ayoola Ayolola (born January 12, 1987) is a Nigerian singer and actor. He won the fifth season of Project Fame West Africa on September 29, 2012.

== Early life and education ==
Ayolola was born in Kano, northern Nigeria, and is the eldest of five children. He attended Covenant University, Ota, Ogun State, where he studied biochemistry.

== Career ==
=== Project Fame West Africa ===
Ayolola won the fifth season of the Project Fame West Africa, where he was gifted a car, ₦2.5 million cash price and a one-year recording deal. He had previously participated in Nigerian Idol where he was eliminated in the first round after reaching the final 12.

=== Acting career ===
Ayolola suspended his music career for acting in 2015 and appeared as Mide in the YouTube series Skinny Girl in Transit. He has also featured in films such as Isoken.

== Filmography ==
=== TV shows ===
Year	Title	Role	Notes	Ref
2025	The Party			
2018–20	The Men's Club	Aminu Garba	A web series by Red TV	
2017	Shagayas and Clarks	Chidi Clark		
2017	Jemeji	Oviyon	An Africa Magic original	
2015–20	Skinny Girl in Transit	Mide	A web series by Ndani TV	
2012–15	Lekki Wives			

=== Films ===
Year	Title	Role	Notes	Ref
2024	Ojai	Professor	Drama / sci-fi	
2022	Come With Me	Jason	Drama	
2020	Lemonade	Ayo Daniels	Drama	
2019	The Set Up	Bamidele Esho	Crime / drama	
2019	Bling Lagosians	Yoruba Demon	Drama	
2019	The Crescent		A sickle cell awareness film	
2018	If I am President	Zinachi Ohams	Political thriller	
2017	Little Drops of Happy	Femi Ojo		
2017	Ever After	Akin		
2017	Isoken	Seye		
2015	Fifty	MC		
2015	Hex	Bode	Horror / short	
