= Whose Meal Ticket =

- Directed by: Grace Edwin-Okon
- Written by: Grace Edwin-Okon
- Produced by: Executive Producer Kehinde Omoru (Producer) Grace Edwin-Okon
- Starring: Akin Lewis, Ngozi Nwosu, Uti Nwachukwu, Shaffi Bello, Lisa Omorodion, Tana Adelana, Femi Durojaiye and Iyke Nnabuife
- Release date: 15 May 2017 (Lekki, Lagos)
- Country: Nigeria
- Language: English

Whose Meal Ticket is a 2017 Nigerian drama film written, directed and produced by Grace Edwin-Okon and executive produced by Kehinde Omoru under the guidance of Roxanne Care Options Foundation and Derwin Productions. The film is a follow-up to Deeply Cut, and it focuses on diabetes and how patients can manage the condition. It stars Akin Lewis, Ngozi Nwosu, Uti Nwachukwu, Shaffy Bello, Lisa Omorodion, Tana Adelana, Femi Durojaiye and Iyke Nnabuife.

== Synopsis ==
The film revolves around a family who is desperate to get their daughter married to a young rich man because of the wealth of his family.

== Cast ==
- Tana Adelana as Aliyah
- Shaffy Bello as Mrs. Disu
- Femi Durojaiye as Mr. Bucknor
- Akin Lewis as Chief Disu
- Iyke Nnabuife as Taiwo Disu
- Uti Nwachukwu as Kehinde Disu
- Ngozi Nwosu as Mrs. Philips
- Lisa Omorodion as Lisa Philips
- Layole Oyatogun

== Premiere ==
The film premiered in Lagos at The Palms, Lekki, on 15 April 2017. During the premiere, the producer, who is a nurse, stated that diabetes is a serious disease, but she wanted to advocate for awareness in a subtle way so that people would understand the damage it can cause and how to manage it. On 24 April 2017, the film premiered in various cinemas across the country.
