= The Bling Lagosians =

2019 Nigerian film

- Directed by: Bolanle Austen-Peters
- Written by: Anthony Kehinde Joseph
- Screenplay by: Anthony Kehinde Joseph
- Produced by: Bolanle Austen-Peters
- Starring: Elvina Ibru; Toyin Abraham; Tana Adelana; Osas Ighodaro; Alexx Ekubo; Ayoola Ayolola; Jide Kosoko; Sharon Ooja
- Distributed by: FilmOne Distributions
- Release date: 28 June 2019
- Running time: 97 minutes
- Country: Nigeria
- Language: English
- Box office: ₦ 120 million

The Bling Lagosians is a 2019 Nigerian drama film, written by Anthony Kehinde Joseph and directed and co-produced by Bolanle Austen-Peters. It premiered on June 16, 2019, in Lagos. It stars Elvina Ibru, Toyin Abraham, Tana Adelana, Osas Ighodaro, Alexx Ekubo, Ayoola Ayolola, and Jide Kosoko.

== Premise ==
The Bling Lagosians centers around the Holloways, a wealthy Lagos family and their mother Mopelola, who is about to celebrate her 51st birthday party. There are individual feuds and fights between family members. Their father Akin takes steps to prevent the foreclosure of the family's business by the Asset Management Corporation.

== Cast ==
- Osas Ighodaro Ajibade as Demidun
- Sharon Ooja as Tokunbo
- Jimmy Odukoya as George
- Gbenga Titiloye as Akin Holloway
- Elvina Ibru as Mopelola Holloway
- Alexx Ekubo as Nnamdi Agu
- Jide Kosoko as Baba Eko
- Winihin Jemede as Oge Briggs
- Toyin Abraham as Adunni Fernandez aka Iya Oge
- Helen Paul as Aunty Joy
- Bisola Aiyeola as Kiki Princewill
- Monalisa Chinda as Ngozi Gomez
- Tana Adelana as Kaima
- Bunmi Aboderin as Board member

== Awards and nominations ==
| Year | Award | Category | Recipient | Result | Ref |
|---|---|---|---|---|---|
| 2020 | Best of Nollywood Awards | Movie with the Best Cinematography | The Bling Lagosians | Won | |
| 2020 | Best of Nollywood Awards | Best Supporting Actor –English | Alexx Ekubo | Won | |
| 2020 | Best of Nollywood Awards | Best Supporting Actress – English | Sharon Ooja | Nominated | |
| 2020 | Best of Nollywood Awards | Most Promising Actor | Denola Grey | Won | |
| 2020 | Best of Nollywood Awards | Movie with the Best Screenplay | The Bling Lagosians | Nominated | |
| 2020 | Best of Nollywood Awards | Best Kiss in a Movie | Alexx Ekubo/Sharon Ooja | Nominated | |
| 2020 | Best of Nollywood Awards | Movie with the Best Comedy | The Bling Lagosians | Nominated | |
