= Catch.er =

- Directed by: Walter Banger Taylaur.
- Starring: OC Ukeje, Beverly Naya, Blossom Chukwujekwu and Tope Tedela
- Release date: October 13, 2017
- Country: Nigeria
- Language: English

Catch.er is a 2017 Nollywood whodunit film directed by Walter Banger Taylaur. The criminal investigative film stars OC Ukeje, Beverly Naya, Blossom Chukwujekwu and Tope Tedela

== Synopsis ==
A dedicated career woman was found murdered on her anniversary day. The case was given to two officers who unravelled different mysteries as the case deepens.

== Premiere ==
The movie was opened to Cinema on October 13, 2017.

== Cast ==
- OC Ukeje
- Blossom Chukuwujekwu
- Beverley Naya
- Alexx Ekubo
- Gbenro Ajibade
- Omowunmi Dada
- Wofai Fada
- Kiki Omeili
- Tope Tedela

== See also ==
- List of Nigerian films of 2018
