= Dolapo Adigun =

Nigerian film director and editor

- Citizenship: Nigerian
- Education: Adekunle Ajasin University; University of Ibadan
- Occupations: Film director, editor, visual effects artist
- Years active: 2020–present
- Known for: Jagun Jagun (2023); Criminal (2024)

Dolapo Adigun is a Nigerian film director, editor and visual effects artist. She is known for her work with Anthill Studios, including as editor of the Netflix film Jagun Jagun (2023) and as director of the Criminal (2024).

== Early life and education ==
Adigun obtained a Bachelor of Arts degree in English from Adekunle Ajasin University in 2013. She later completed a Master of Arts degree in Cultural and Media Studies at the University of Ibadan.

== Career ==
Adigun started her career in 2020 after participating in a training programme for women in film editing organised by the studio's founder, Niyi Akinmolayan. She worked in roles including visual effects artist, digital imaging technician, first assistant director and post-production supervisor on several of the company's productions.

She served as editor and post-production supervisor on the 2023 Netflix original Jagun Jagun. In the same year she co-wrote The House of Secrets with Niyi Akinmolayan and directed selected scenes on the production.

In 2024 Adigun made her feature directorial debut with Criminal, a hospital-hostage thriller written by Niyi Akinmolayan and produced by Anthill Studios. The film was released in Nigerian cinemas on 31 May 2024 and later became available on Amazon Prime Video. The cast includes Uzor Arukwe, Funlola Aofiyebi and Segun Arinze.

Adigun also worked as editor and head of post-production on Colours of Fire (2025). The film won three awards at the 12th Africa Magic Viewers' Choice Awards in 2026: Best Lead Actor (Uzor Arukwe), Best Costume Design, and Best Art Direction.

== Filmography ==
Year	Title	Role	Notes
2023	Jagun Jagun	Editor, post-production supervisor	Netflix original
2023	The House of Secrets	Co-writer, editor, post-production supervisor	Co-written with Niyi Akinmolayan
2023	Mikolo	Editor, Post-production Supervisor	
2024	Criminal	Director, Editor	Feature directorial debut
2025	Colours of Fire	Editor, head of post-production	Won three awards at the 12th Africa Magic Viewers' Choice Awards in 2026

== Awards ==
Year	Award	Category	Nominated work	Result	Ref.
2023	Best of Nollywood Awards	Movie with the Best Editing	The House of Secrets	Won	
2024	Africa Movie Academy Awards	Achievement in Visual Effects	Jagun Jagun	Won	
