= Jumoke Odetola =

Nigerian Actress (born 1988)

- Born: Olajumoke Odetola; 16 October 1988 (age 37); Lagos, Nigeria
- Education: Ajayi Crowther University
- Occupations: Actress; Model; Producer

Olajumoke Odetola (born 16 October 1988) is a Nigerian actress and film producer.

== Early life and education ==
Born on 16 October 1988 in Lagos. Odetola attended ABATI Nur/Pry School in Lagos State, she then had her secondary education at Abeokuta Grammar School. She obtained her first degree from Ajayi Crowther University, Oyo State getting a bachelor's degree in Information and Communication Technology/Computer Science, she then proceeded to Federal University of Agriculture, Abeokuta, graduating with a master's degree in Computer Science.

== Awards ==
In 2015, she won revelation of the year category at BON Awards. Also, at the Africa Magic Viewers' Choice Awards, Odetola won the award for best indigenous language film for her role in Binta Ofege and somewhere in the dark. She retained the award in the 5th edition of the ceremony through Somewhere in the Dark. She also won the best actress in a lead role (Yoruba) at 2017 Best of Nollywood Awards in Ogun State. The 2017 City People Movie Awards saw Odetola get a nomination for best supporting actress (Yoruba).

In 2026, she was honoured by her alma mater, Ajayi Crowther University, during a distinguished personality lecture held at the institution in Oyo State.

== Filmography ==
- Heroes and Zeros (2012)
- Bachelor's Eve (2018)
- HigiHaga
- Tinsel
- The Return Of HigiHaga
- Family Ties
- Wetin Women Want (2018) as Sola
- My Mirror (2021)
- Jenifa on Lockdown (2021)
- Queen Lateefah (2024)
