= Bachelor's Eve =

2018 Nigerian film

- Directed by: Rotimi Raji
- Produced by: Adefajo Ayobami
- Starring: Wole Ojo, Kehinde Bankole, Frankincense Eche Ben, Gbenro Ajibade, Doris Simeon, Jumoke Odetola, Kehinde Olorunyomi
- Production company: Juma Productions
- Release date: 2018
- Country: Nigeria

Bachelor's Eve is a 2018 Nigerian romantic comedy film directed by Rotimi Raji and produced by Adefajo Ayobami under Juma Productions. It was distributed by Metro Classic Pictures. The film stars Kehinde Bankole, Doris Simeon, Gbenro Ajibade, Frankincense Eche-Ben, Jumoke Odetola and Kehinde Olorunyomi.

== Synopsis ==
The story revolves around a handsome playboy who is ready to marry. However, he decided to hang around with his friends 24 hours to the wedding and there are a lot of unanswered questions that put the marriage under probability.

== Cast ==
- Jumoke Odetola
- Wole Ojo as Uche
- Kehinde Bankole
- Gbenro Ajibade
- Doris Simeon
- Kehinde Olorunyomi
- Frankincense Eche-Ben
- Bade Smart
- Jennifer Ikeji

== Premiere ==
The film was released on 16 February 2018 across the country.
