= Gbenro Ajibade =

Nigerian actor and model (born 1985)

- Born: Gbenro Emmanuel Ajibade; December 8, 1985 (age 40); Maiduguri, Borno State, Nigeria
- Other name: Gbenro Emmanuel Ajibade
- Citizenship: Nigerian
- Education: Benue State University
- Occupations: Actor, model, TV host film producer
- Years active: 2008–present
- Notable work: Tinsel
- Spouse: Osas Ighodaro (m. 2015–2019)
- Children: 1
- Website: Official website

Gbenro Ajibade (born Gbenro Emmanuel Ajibade; December 8, 1985) is a Nigerian actor, producer, model and presenter.

== Biography ==
Though originally from Odo ere Yagba west, Kogi state, He attended Makurdi International School and later Mount Saint Gabriel's Secondary School. He then completed his education by graduating from Benue State University with a degree in biology.

He was a lead character in the popular soap opera Tinsel and has acted in Gbomo Gbomo Express and The Wages.

Ajibade won Most Outstanding Actor/Model of the Year at the 2011 Nigerian Model Achievers Awards.

== Personal life ==
He was married to actress Osas Ighodaro, together, they have one daughter, Azariah Tiwatope Osarugue Ajibade. They divorced in 2019 after four years of marriage.

== Filmography ==
=== Films ===
- 30's (2015)
- The Wages (2013) as Kaycee
- Twisted Thorne (2011)
- Shattered Romance (2014) as Tony
- Gbomo Gbomo Express (2015) as Filo
- Locked Up (2016) as Marcel
- Catch.er (2017)
- Couple's Award (2017) as Tunde
- Bachelor's Eve (2018)
- Hip Hop Holiday (2019) as Trey
- Cold Calm (2020) as Steve
- Akata? (2021) as Emmanuel
- Parallels (2022) as Alex Carson
- Remembrance of a Forgotten Man (2022) as Alex Carson
- Face to Face (2023) as Dr. Henry

=== Television ===
- Tinsel (2008–current) as Soji Bankole

== See also ==
- List of Yoruba people
