= Criminal (2024 film) =

2024 Nigerian film

- Directed by: Dolapo Adigun
- Written by: Niyi Akinmolayan
- Produced by: Victoria Akujobi
- Starring: Uzor Arukwe; Funlola Aofiyebi; Segun Arinze; Gbubemi Ejeye; Obehi Aburime; Taye Arimoro
- Production company: Anthill Studios
- Release date: 31 May 2024 (Nigeria)
- Running time: 85 minutes
- Country: Nigeria
- Language: English
- Box office: ₦54.2 million

Criminal is a 2024 Nigerian crime thriller film directed by Dolapo Adigun in her feature directorial debut and written by Niyi Akinmolayan. It was produced by Victoria Akujobi for Anthill Studios. The film stars Uzor Arukwe and Funlola Aofiyebi.

== Plot ==
The story is set in a Lagos hospital dealing with victims of a major road accident. A criminal and members of his gang force their way in with an injured relative and demand that a doctor treat him, resulting in a hostage situation.

Greenleaf Hospital is handling a large influx of patients from a road accident when Uzo and his associates arrive with his gunshot-wounded brother. They insist that Dr Amara Nwachukwu provide immediate treatment. The hospital staff explain the existing pressure on resources and contact the police, after which the situation develops into a hostage standoff involving staff and patients.

== Cast ==
- Uzor Arukwe as Uzo
- Funlola Aofiyebi as Dr Amara Nwachukwu
- Austine Onuoha as Chima
- Segun Arinze
- Gbubemi Ejeye
- Obehi Aburime
- Taye Arimoro as Officer Bade
- Chuks Joseph as Obi
- Bryan Okoye as Ekene
- OG Tega
- Miriam Peters

== Production ==
Anthill Studios began principal photography in late 2023. The project marked Dolapo Adigun's first feature film as director. She had previously worked as an editor on films including Jagun Jagun and Mikolo and participated in the studio's directors' training programme. Niyi Akinmolayan wrote the screenplay and is the founder of Anthill Studios. Victoria Akujobi produced the film.

The hospital sets were purpose-built for the production. The film runs for 85 minutes.

== Release ==
Criminal was released in Nigerian cinemas on 31 May 2024. It remained in theatres for six weeks, reaching a widest release of 55 cinemas, and grossed ₦54,217,916 according to figures compiled by Nollywire. The film became available on Amazon Prime Video on 2 August 2024.
