= Yaba Cemetery =

Cemetery in Yaba, Lagos, Nigeria

Coordinates: 6.514774°N 3.378677°E

Yaba Cemetery is situated in Yaba, an eastern suburb of Lagos, Nigeria. It is a civil cemetery known locally as Atan Cemetery.

The cemetery contains the largest concentration of World War II era war graves in Nigeria.
