= Ibakatv =

Nigerian Video on demand platform

ibakatv
- Owner: Blessed Idornigie
- Website: http://ibakatv.com/
- Launched: 1 December 2011
- Current status: Active

ibakatv is a Video on demand platform for Nollywood movies; it has over 15,000 hours of movie and TV content streamed on-demand.

Ibakatv is part of ibaka Entertainment which was founded in 2011 in Lagos, by Blessed Idornigie, with the support of his partners/investors Mr. Kazim Adeoti and Dr. Gbolahan Olaniyi, Ayodele Awoleye and other family and friends. ibakatv is now one of the fastest-growing internet entertainment companies in Nigeria and is currently YouTube's biggest sub-Saharan African partner.

== History ==
iBAKA Entertainment Ltd was founded in 2011 in Lagos, by Blessed Idornigie, with the support of his partners/investors. Idornigie's had entered into many online businesses, from e-gold to multilevel marketing. At 27, he had worked in five different companies before discovering that the Nollywood industry needs more competitive and innovative ideas in online movies streaming and distribution, content immortalisation and security.

He decided to do more research about the industry and found out that Nollywood content is highly demanded within and in the diaspora. That began the journey of ibakatv.

The aim was to create a platform that would become the viewer's choice destination in African Internet entertainment. He started in out in his room with a laptop and with support from family members and friends. The company was birthed in 2011. Idorngie later brought in partners that injected some funds into the business. September 2012 marked the turning point for ibakatv, after it acquired YouTube Premium Partnership and with four major channels, ibakatv|NOLLYWOOD, ibakatv|YORUBA, AFRICAMAGICCLIP and ibakatv with a monthly hit of about 6m to 20m at Estimated Watch Time of about 80M to 200M as at today.

This success on YouTube was one of the motivating factors that inspired the company to create its own official online movie-streaming platform called IBAKATV.COM.

Today, aside the fact that ibakatv is YouTube's biggest premium partner in Sahara Africa, it has built a global audience of over 500 million video views, 5 billion estimated watch time and over 1 million unique subscribers from over 220 different countries which includes, United States, United Kingdom, Nigeria, Canada, South Africa, Kenya, Ghana, Uganda, Spain, Australia and many others. It generates more than 1million hit daily.

== Platforms ==
Ibakatv has reached various devices. In its bid to make Nollywood entertainment accessible to all classes of audience, Ibakatv apps was introduced. This guarantees audience satisfaction and makes viewing and access to Nollywood, Ghallywood and other African entertainment on the go. Ibakatv is available on Google Play and App Store which makes Android and iOS devices (along with Fire HD tablets) users can download the app from their respective stores. Ibakatv is also available on smart TVs, which means users can also access the app on their Samsung, Amazon Fire TV, Roku, Apple TV and Android TV devices. Ibakatv prides itself as a luminary in Video-On-Demand.
