= Elvina Ibru =

Nigerian actress and On Air Personality

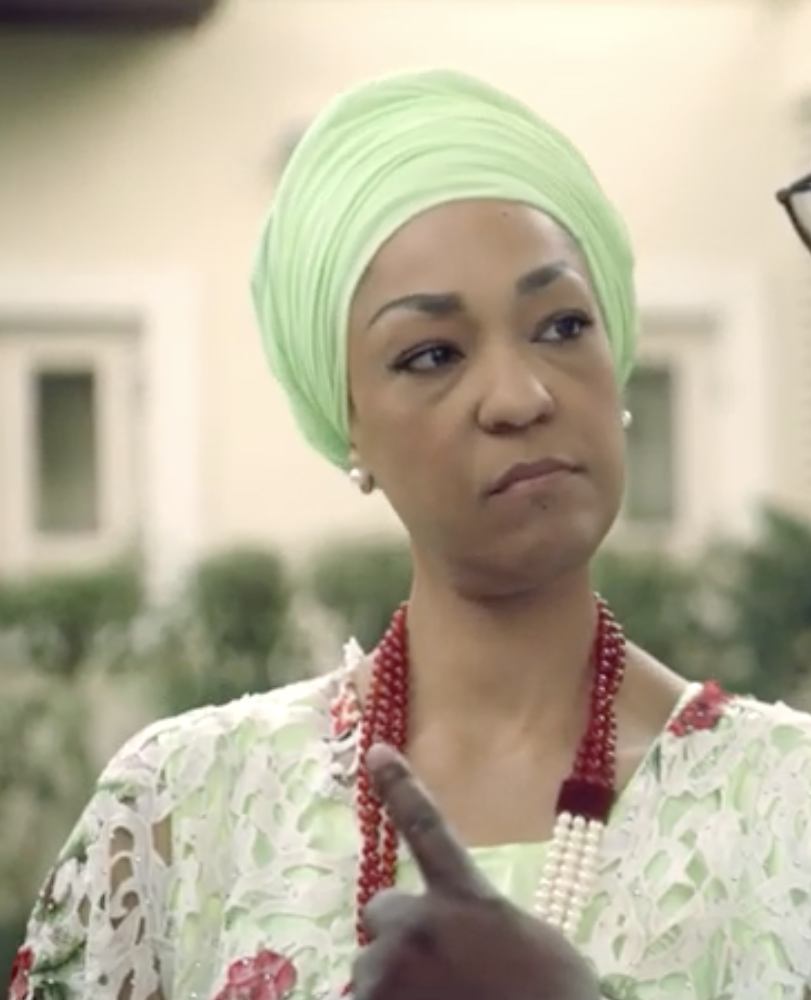
- Born: Elvina Esewvre Ibru; 22 May 1972 (age 54)
- Education: International Relations
- Alma mater: London Academy of Performing Arts; Webster University
- Occupation: Actress
- Known for: Hear Word! The Bling Lagosians
- Family: Ibru dynasty

Elvina "Baby" Ibru (born 22 May 1972) is a Nigerian actress and on-air personality. She is best known for her role as Mrs. Holloway in the drama film The Bling Lagosians, for which she was nominated for Best Actress in a Leading Role at the 16th Africa Movie Academy Awards.

== Early life and education ==
Ibru was born on 22 May 1972 at Nicolas Hospital in Apapa, Lagos, the 11th child of Nigerian industrialist Michael Ibru. She attended Corona School in Victoria Island, before moving to Goud Hurst College in England at the age of 8. Ibru transferred to Kent College for Girls at the age of 11 and later studied at the London Academy of Performing Arts. She earned a bachelor's degree in International Relations from Webster University, Regents Park, London.

== Career ==
Ibru began her professional career in British theatre. In 1989, she joined the National Youth Music Theatre, where she performed alongside Jude Law and Jonny Lee Miller. She appeared in Bertolt Brecht’s The Caucasian Chalk Circle at the Edinburgh Festival. She later performed in productions at theatres including The Old Vic, the Lyric Theatre and the Lyceum Theatre in London.

She subsequently worked as a broadcaster with the British Broadcasting Corporation (BBC). Ibru later returned to Nigeria and continued her career in broadcasting and theatre.

In Nigeria, Ibru worked as an on-air personality at Classic FM, where she hosted Mellow Magic. In 2016, she won the Beatz Awards for on-air personality of the year.

Ibru made her film debut in Letters to a Stranger (2007), playing Tare. She subsequently appeared in Theo's Dora (2014), Entreat (2016), Wives on Strike: The Revolution (2017), Alter Ego (2017), Power of 1 (2018), and The Bling Lagosians (2019).

Her theatre work in Nigeria has included The Vagina Monologues and Hear Word!. She later appeared in the Africa Magic television series Riona, playing Atigbi, and in Slum King (2023).

Ibru also established the production company 2wice As Nice Limited, which produced documentaries, concerts, events and television programmes. The company produced the film Cajoling and was also involved in the production of Idols West Africa in collaboration with Fremantle Media and M-Net.

== Filmography ==
=== Stage plays ===
Year	Title	Ref
2006	Vagina Monologues	
2014	Hear Word!	
2019	Emotan	

=== Films ===
Year	Title	Role	Ref
2007	Letters to a Stranger	Tare	
2014	Theo’s Dora	Dora	
2016	Entreat		
2016	Cajoling		
2017	Wives on Strike: The revolution	Shaka	
2017	Alter Ego	Barrister Komolafe	
2018	Power of 1	First Lady	
2019	Bling Lagosians	Mopelola Holloway	
2021	Sanitation Day	Contractor	
2020	Kambili: The whole 30 yards	Cynthia	
2023	Tarella: Princess of the Nile	Senora	
2024	The Uprising: Wives on Strike 3	Shaka	
2025	A Very Dirty Christmas	Maggie	
2025	Loving Aduke	Sharon	
2026	Beauty Is the Beast	Prudence	
2026	Osu: Properties of the Gods		

=== TV shows ===
Year	Title	Role	Ref
2020	Riona	Atigbiolaoye	
2023	Slum King		

== Personal life ==
Ibru is a single mother to her son, Elisha. She has also expressed her unwillingness to be married, stating that "the marriage institution in Nigeria is unfair to women."

In a 2019 interview, Ibru recounted having been raped by an armed robber in 2004. Ibru subsequently formed an advocacy group to support victims of rape. In 2021, she disclosed on her Instagram page that she tested positive for COVID-19.
