= Hear Word! =

Stage play by Ifeoma Fafunwa

- Genre: Stage Play
- Created by: Ifeoma Fafunwa
- Written by: Ifeoma Fafunwa, Tunde Aladese, Wole Oguntokun
- Starring: Taiwo Ajai-Lycett, Joke Silva, Ufuoma McDermott, Elvina Ibru
- Original language: English

Production
- Running time: 90 minutes
- Production company: iOpeneye Limited

Hear Word! or Hear Word! Naija Woman Talk True is a play by Ifeoma Fafunwa. It is a collection of monologues, songs and dance based on true-life stories of Nigerian women’s struggle for equality, safety, and access to opportunities and leadership. The play has been seen by over 120,000 live audience members and positively reviewed by the New York Times and the Boston Globe.

The play premiered in Lagos, Nigeria in 2014 at the Musical Society of Nigeria (MUSON) Centre and had its international debut at Harvard University in Cambridge, Massachusetts.

Hear Word! is the first Nigerian play to be staged at the American Repertory Theatre. The play transferred to The Public's Under the Radar Festival, where it was positively reviewed by the New York Times.

== Description ==
Hear Word! is produced by iOpenEye Africa Foundation, and sometimes in partnership with international theaters, global and local nonprofit organisations and leading corporations in Nigeria.

The play runs for 90 minutes and is delivered by a cast of 10 female performers, 3 male percussionists and 1 female director. It is agitprop theater and can be performed without a set or in a site-specific location. The cast will sometimes do street storms, performing the show unannounced in markets, bus stops and university campuses.

The show targets real issues affecting the lives of women and which limit their potential for independence, leadership and meaningful contribution to society.

At the end of each show, audiences can participate in a moderated open dialogue session, which includes the actors and local gender issues stakeholders.

== Plot ==
The play starts off with lighthearted and somewhat humorous monologues depicting everyday situations where women navigate a patriarchal world in which they are marginalized: groping, harassment, exclusion etc. including scenes which boldly highlight ways in which women themselves contribute to their own marginalization.

The lightheartedness gives way to a section of monologues portraying harmful ways in which women are victimized, devalued, and oppressed: including molestation, child marriage, rape, sex trafficking, and domestic violence.

This painful section is punctuated by a shrill call to action in the form of a chant in Yoruba which ushers in an exhilarating and refreshing second half of the play with powerful portraits of resistance, triumph and celebration. The play concludes with a piece that re-captures the different themes in the play, and a direct appeal to audiences to get engaged, take action, and become part of the solution.

== Background ==
Hear Word! is derived from a Nigerian Pidgin-English phrase, which means "Listen and Comply". The play was created and co-written by Ifeoma Fafunwa, a Nigerian playwright, producer and director. In 2001, she began writing, curating and documenting real-life stories from women across Nigeria, as well as her own personal stories, some of which ended up in the play, Hear Word!

The play presents an intimate view into the obstacles that Nigerian women face, including stories of domestic violence, absence of women from positions of power, resilience and resistance, shattering the culture of silence, overturning the status quo, abuse, disrespect, bravery, sisterhood and joy.

The play was inspired by The Vagina Monologues and For Colored Girls Who Have Considered Suicide.

== Reviews ==
Hear Word! has now been viewed by over 120,000 live audience members across Africa, Europe and the United States. After touring across Nigeria, the show debuted internationally at Harvard University then went on to showcase internationally at renowned theatres such as Frascati Theater (Amsterdam), The Public theater (New York), The Thalia Theater (Hamburg), Segerstron Centre for the Arts (Costa Mesa), and the Edinburgh International Festival.

In 2018, Hear Word! sold out to a diverse audience at American Repertory Theater. The production was featured as the event opener for the United Nations 2018 Commission for the Status of Women in March 2018.

The Harvard Crimson in its review of the play, praised its ability to address the pain of abuse and harassment, stating that it was achieved flawlessly due to the masterful script and to the actresses who handle the conflicting feelings with care.

Boston Globe as describes the play as "a call for female solidarity and empowerment". Ben Brantley of the New York Times wrote "The brightness radiating from its all-female cast has the glare and heat of a raging bonfire." Sahara Reporters pronounces it as "deeply entertaining as it is profoundly philosophical."

== Reception ==
On 31 December 2018, the cast and crew of Hear Word! were hosted to a 'meet & greet' by Air France at the Murtala Mohammed Airport in Lagos, airport patrons were treated to a flash-mob performance and photo-ops with cast members.

In January 2019 the play debuted at New York’s premiere off-Broadway - the Public Theater, and was described by Theater Mania as a "jubilant act of artistic exorcism". A review in the New York Times stated "By the end of "HEAR WORD! Naija Woman Talk True," from the Nigerian company iOpenEye Ltd., the brightness radiating from its all-female cast has the glare and heat of a raging bonfire."

Hear Word! has also premiered at the Segerstrom Center in Costa Mesa, California the Thalia Theater in Hamburg, Germany and the Royal Lyceum Theater at the Edinburgh Festival in Scotland in August, 2019. And also at 2022 West Africa Tour (Accra, Abuja, Ibadan, Lagos), Elevation Church, and Leaders of Faith & Culture.

Inspired by Hear Word!, in collaboration with Theater de Namur (Namur) and Theater Varia (Belgium), Ifeoma worked with everyday women, actors and translators to develop the play titled Écoute – a showcase of inequality and gender-based violence in everyday Belgian society.

Hear Word! was performed for the wives of governors of the 36 States of Nigeria in Aso Rock.

It has been performed in many African cities including Lagos, Accra, Benin City, Enugu, Abeokuta, Nsukka, Ibadan, Abuja, Makoko, Ife, Addis Ababa, Monrovia and internationally in cities like Cambridge, Hamburg, Edinburgh, New York, Boston, Costa Mesa, Hartford, Amsterdam.

The show has been performed in Schools and Universities including; University of Lagos, University of Ibadan, University of Ife, University of Nigeria, Nsukka, University of Ibadan, University of Ife, Connecticut State University, Harvard University, St. Gregory’s College, Holy Child College, Children’s International School

In 2020 and 2021, the EU and British Council through the ROLAC program supported shows in Abuja and Lagos.

In 2022, the show went to five cities across West Africa. The initiative was supported by the Ford Foundation.
