= Newton Aduaka =

Nigerian filmmaker (born 1966)

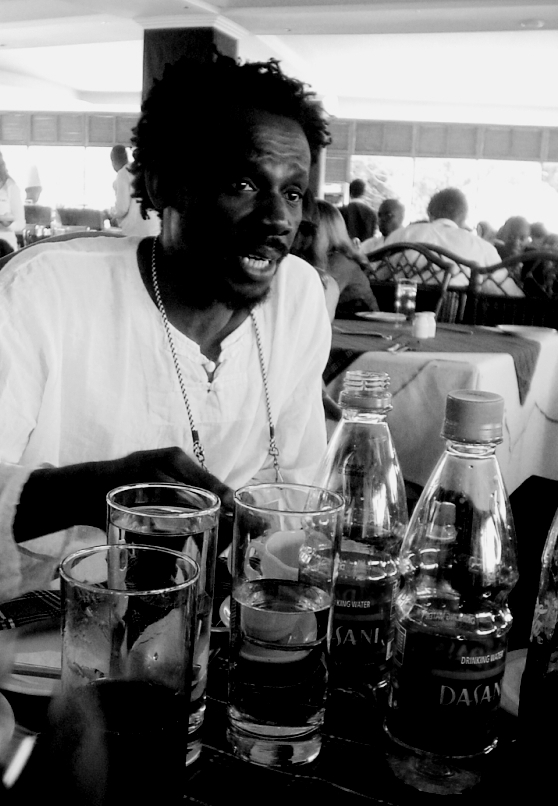
- Born: 1966 (age 59–60)
- Occupation: filmmaker
- Notable work: Rage; Ezra

Newton I. Aduaka (born 1966) is an England-based, Nigerian-born filmmaker, winner of Best Director at the Pan African Film Festival.

== Filmography ==
=== Short films ===
- Voices Behind the Wall (1990)
- Carnival of Silence (1994)
- On the Edge (1997)
- Funeral (2002)

=== Feature films ===
- Rage (1999)
- Ezra (2007)

== See also ==
- List of Nigerian film directors

== Notes ==
- "Aduaka, Newton Biography". Screenonline. British Film Institute. Archived from the original on 5 August 2015.
- Indiewire
- Hollywood Reporter
- Variety
