= Bolaji Ogunmola =

Nigerian actress

- Born: Bolaji Ogunmola; 21 April 1992 (age 34)
- Citizenship: Nigeria
- Education: University of Ilorin; National Open University of Nigeria; Royal Arts Academy
- Occupation: Actress
- Years active: 2013-present
- Notable work: Tough Love

Bolaji Ogunmola is a Nigerian actress.

== Personal life and education ==
Ogunmola had her primary education at Philomena Nursery and Primary School in Ebute Metta, before going to Ibadan for her secondary school. She studied business management and entrepreneurship at the National Open University of Nigeria. Ogunmola is also an alumna of the University of Ilorin. She trained professionally as an actor at the Royal Arts Academy. Speaking to Vanguard on her relationship status, Ogunmola said, "I am single but not searching. I am independent and working hard to make money." She also said that money was a core ingredient in a successful relationship. In a 2016 interview, she said that even though she is more attracted to light-skinned men, she does not encourage bleaching of any form.

== Career ==
Ogunmola was a participant in the 2013 Next Movie Star reality show. Her role in Okon goes to School has been cited as the first film in which she appeared professionally.

On being given roles, due to her physique rather than her acting skills, Ogunmola explained that her feminine figure, body language, the charismatic movement, and acting talents were all subsets of the universal her, and if one is viewed as more pronounced than another, it does not make her less valuable as an actor. For her role in Sobi's Mystic, she was listed as one of the five most promising Nollywood actresses by The News Guru. In an interview with The Punch, she describes her double role as Aida/Mystic in the film as the most challenging in her career. She also highlighted Biodun Stephen, Mo Abudu, and Oprah Winfrey as persons to whom she looks up in the business of film-making.

She had two nominations at the 2018 City People Movie Awards. She is of the opinion that she has more focus on her craft and not stardom.

=== Selected filmography ===
- Tough Love (2017) as Monike
- Sobi's Mystic (2017) as Aida
- All Shades of Wrong (2018) as Mo
- Okon Goes to School (2012)
- Tempted (2017) as Amanda
- Outcast
- Out of Luck (2015)
- On Bended Knees
- Squatterz (season 1)
- Lekki Wives (season 1) as Jane
- Jenifa's Diary (season 1)
- Living Next to You
- Levi (2019) as Gina
- Progressive Tailors Club (2021) as Bisi
- A Simple Lie (2021) as Donna
- Unhappily Married (2021)
- Living with Baami (2021) as Sharon
- Broken Deal (2022) as Casie
- Watching Over You (2022) as Caro
- Step Family (2023)
- The Cook (2023) as Grace
- Pregnancy (2023) as Bolatito
- Ajosepo (2024) as Mary
- Japa (2024) as Clara
- Gingerrr (2025)

== Awards and nominations ==
Year	Award	Category	Result	Ref
2020	Best of Nollywood Awards	Revelation of the Year (female)	Won	

== See also ==
- List of Nigerian actresses
- List of Yoruba people
