= Fred Amata =

Nigerian actor, producer and director

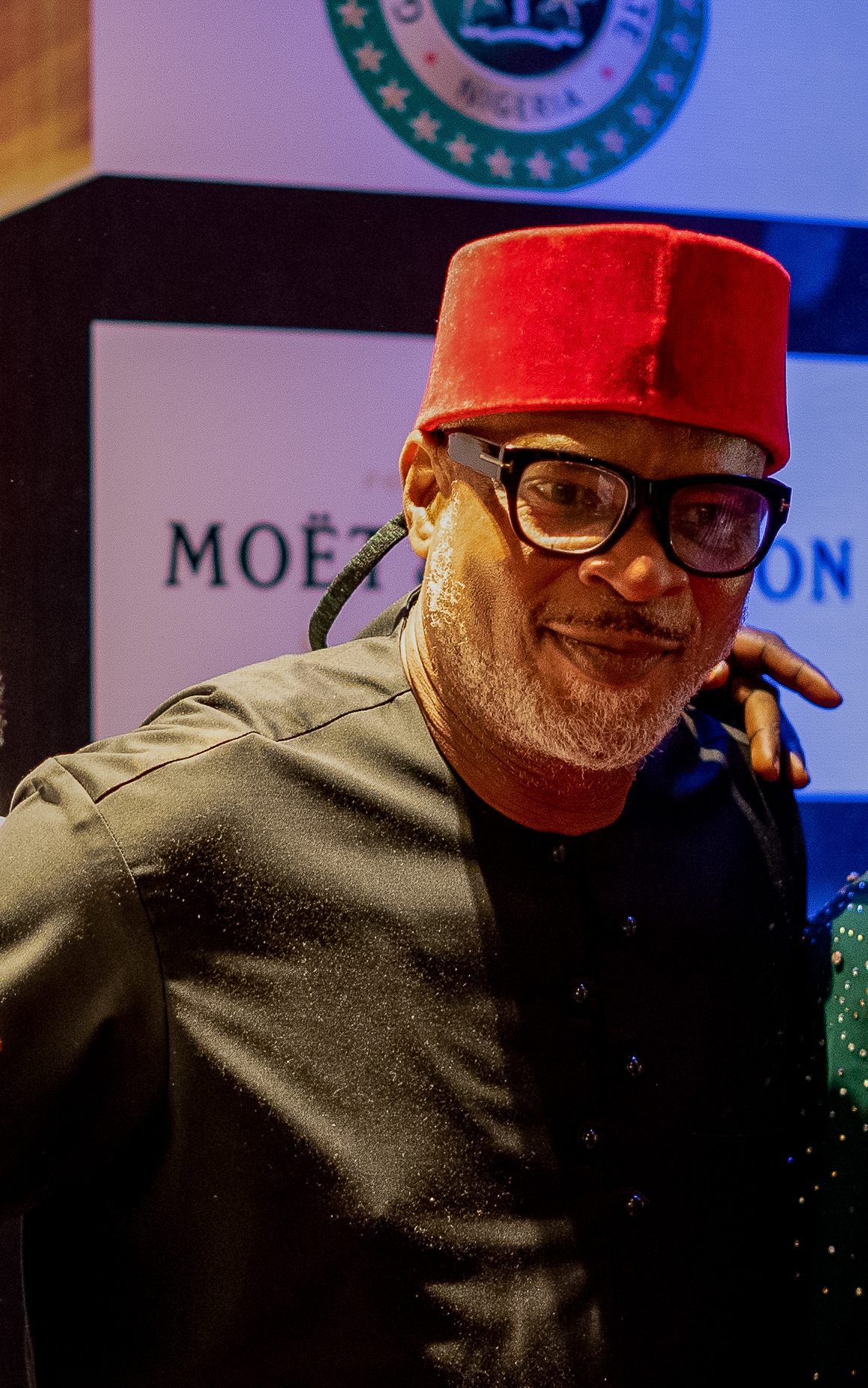
- Amata at the 2021 Africa Movie Academy Award
- Born: Fred Amata; Nigeria
- Citizenship: Nigeria
- Education: University of Jos
- Occupations: Actor, producer, director
- Years active: 1986-till present

Fred Amata is a Nigerian actor, producer, and director. A graduate of Theatre Arts from the University of Jos, Fred shot into the limelight in 1986 for his role in a film titled Legacy. He served as the president of the Directors Guild of Nigeria from 27 February 2016 to 2021 and was succeeded by Victor Okhai.

== Partial filmography ==
- The Addict (199?) (director, screenwriter, and executive producer only)
- Dust to Dust (1996) (director only)
- Legacy (1996)
- Mortal Inheritance (1996)
- Arusi-Iyi (1998) (director only)
- Rapture (1998) (director only)
- Suicide Mission (1998) (director only)
- Witches (1998) (director only)
- Ijele (1999) (director only)
- Oganigwe (1999) (director only)
- Kids Are Angry (2001) (director only)
- Light & Darkness (2001) (also director)
- Married to a Witch (2001) (director only)
- My Love (2002) (also director)
- Keeping Faith: Is That Love? (2002)
- Black Mamba (2002)
- Dangerous Desire (2003)
- Hand of God (2003) - Nnamdi
- The Kingmaker (2003) (director only)
- The Return (2003)
- Images in the Mirror (2004) - Doctor Tade (also director)
- The London Boy (2004)
- A Kiss From Rose (2004)
- Anini (2005) - Baba Kingsley (also director)
- Before the Sunrise (2005) (also director)
- Blind Obsession (2005) (director only)
- Emotional Hazard (2005) - Chidi
- Fated (2005) - Jude (Nigerian Version)
- Fragile Pain (2005) (director only)
- Girls in the Hood (2005) (director only)
- Goodbye Another Day (2005) (director only)
- Hidden Treasures (2005)
- Wheel of Change (2005)
- The Amazing Grace (2006) - Etim
- The Empire (2006) - Tony Odogwu
- Family Affair (2006)
- She: You Must Obey (2006)
- She2: You Must Obey (2006)
- She3: You Must Obey (2006)
- Tumini's Song (2006) (director only)
- Dear God (2007) (also director)
- Letters to a Stranger (2007) - Fredrick Okoh (also director)
- Blindfold (2008)
- Freedom in Chain (2009)
- Black Gold (2011) - Gideon White
- Black November (2012) - Gideon White
- Road to Redemption (2016) - Aminu
- Stormy Hearts (2017) - Mr. Bako
- " Excess Luggage" (2017) - Mr Ekwenife
- The Sessions (2020 film) (2020) - Mr. Oghenekaro
- Rattlesnake: The Ahanna Story (2020) - Senator Obasi
- Mr Incredible (2021) - Uncle Mazi
- Warmth in Despair (2022) as Chief Peter
- Saint Oyinda" (2022)
- The Cure (2022) - Chief Dumebi
- A Place Called Forward (2022)

== Awards and nominations ==
Fred Amata awards and nominations
Awards and nominations
Award	Wins	Nominations
Africa Movie Academy Award	0	4

Totals (Note: Certain award groups do not simply award one winner. They acknowledge several different recipients, have runners-up, and have third place. Since this is a specific recognition and is different from losing an award, runner-up mentions are considered wins in this award tally. For simplification and to avoid errors, each award in this list has been presumed to have had a prior nomination.)
- Wins: 0
- Nominations: 4

Year	Award ceremony	Recipient/Nominated work	Prize	Result
2006	2nd Africa Movie Academy Awards	Himself	Best Director	Nominated
2006	2nd Africa Movie Academy Awards	Anini	Best Film	Nominated
2007	3rd Africa Movie Academy Awards	Himself	Best Actor in a Supporting Role	Nominated
2010	6th Africa Movie Academy Awards	Freedom in Chain	Best Nigerian Film	Nominated

== See also ==
- List of Nigerian film producers
