= Wumi Toriola =

Nigerian film actress

Wunmi Toriola
- Born: Olawunmi Toriola; 11 July 1988 (age 37 years); Lagos, Nigeria
- Education: University of Ilorin
- Occupations: Film actress Film producer
- Years active: 2009–present
- Website: da

Wumi Toriola (born 11 July 1988) is a Nigerian film actress and film producer.

== Early life and education ==
Toriola was born in Lagos, Nigeria. She attended Providence Primary and Secondary School in Lagos State before proceeding to the University of Ilorin, where she obtained a bachelor's degree in linguistics.

== Career ==
In 2009, Toriola received her first acting role in the film Odunfa Caucus and produced her first film, Ajewunmi, in 2015.

In 2018, she won the Fastest Rising Actress (Yoruba) award at the City People Entertainment Awards.

== Personal life ==
Toriola got married in 2018. She gave birth to her first child on 14 October 2019.

In 2023, she announced via her Instagram page that her marriage of four years had ended.

== Filmography ==
=== Actor ===
- Alakada Reloaded (2017) as Wumi
- Ayomipo
- Wedding Ring
- Our Love Story
- False Flag (2017)
- The Cokers (2021) as Adejoke
- Battle on Buka Street (2022) as Titi
- Ija (2023) as Itunnu
- Crossroads (2024) as Dunni
- Queen Lateefah (2024) as Lateefah
- Farmer's Bride (2024)
- Eje Kan (2025)
- Owambe Thieves (2025)
- Gingerrr (2025)

=== Producer ===
- Obinrin
- Ajewunmi
- My Past
- Ayo Ife
- Sugbon Kan
- Omo Better
- Eso Ajara
- Loko Laya
- Ofin Aje
- Konge (1,2,3)

== Awards and nominations ==
| Year | Award | Category | Result | Ref |
|---|---|---|---|---|
| 2018 | City People Entertainment Awards | Fastest Rising Actress (Yoruba) | Won | |
| 2021 | Yoruba Music and Films Awards | Best Actress | Nominated | |

== See also ==
- List of Nigerian film producers
- List of Yoruba people
