= Mide Martins =

Nigerian actress

- Born: Mide Funmi Martins; 12 April 1979 (age 47); Lagos Island, Lagos State, Nigeria
- Education: Olabisi Onabanjo University
- Occupations: Thespian; film producer; film actor
- Years active: 2002–present

Mide Funmi Martins is a Nollywood actress, model and movie producer. She is the daughter of Funmi Martins.

== Early life and education ==
Martins obtained her primary school from Community Grammar School, Ibadan and her Secondary School Certificate from Providence Heights Secondary School, Fagba, Lagos, after which she went to Olabisi Onabanjo University, Ago Iwoye to receive a diploma in international relations.

== Career ==
Martins started her career after the death of her mother in 2002. She has featured and produced several movies.

In July 2026, Martins released Iya (Mother), a two-part Yoruba drama exploring the sacrifices and resilience of a single mother raising three children amid poverty, directed by her husband, Afeez "Owo" Abiodun. The film premiered on 11 July 2026 on the MIDE MARTINSTV YouTube channel and had attracted over four million views by early August 2026. Martins described a scene from the production as so emotionally powerful that she and co-stars Yetunde Barnabas and Jide Awobona were unable to stop crying even after filming had ended, and had to console one another on set. Amid the film's release, Martins publicly paid tribute to her late mother, Funmi Martins, on Instagram, describing her as her "pillar" and "backbone" and thanking her for continuing to "watch [her] back" since her death, with many observers noting the tribute's added resonance given the film's title and themes of motherhood.

== Personal life ==
Martins is the daughter of Funmi Martins, a veteran Nollywood actress who died of a heart attack in 2002.

Martins is married to Afeez Owo, and they have two children.

== Filmography ==
- Makan Je (2001)
- Arewa (2003)
- Orejomi (2005)
- Kilebi Olorun (2007)
- Ife Owo (2008)
- Amoye (2008)
- Osas Omoge Benin (2012)
- Omoge Lekki (2016)
- Ameerah (2021)
- Onitemi (2022)
- The Wedding Planner (2022)
- Iyawo Buga (2022)
- Haunted Pleasures (2022)
- The Party (2025)
- Iya (2026)
