= Platanos Y Collard Greens =

Play by David Lamb

- Original language: English
- Written by: David Lamb
- Genre: Romantic comedy

Premiere
- Date: 27 June 2003
- Place: The Producers' Club; New York City
- Official website

Platanos Y Collard Greens is a play written by David Lamb and produced by Jamillah Lamb. This romantic comedy explores relations between African Americans and Latinos in New York City through a relationship between two college students.

== Background ==
Based on David Lamb's novel Do Platanos Go Wit’ Collard Greens?, the play opened on June 27, 2003 at the Producers Club, a small Off-Broadway theater. That fall the play began its annual tour to American colleges and universities, performing first at the University of Illinois’ Champaign campus.

== Characters ==
- Freeman is an African-American college student who is running for student government president. He is in love with Angelita.
- Samana is Angelita's mother. An immigrant from the Dominican Republic she wants what she believes is best for Angelita, and that means no Freeman or any African-American for that matter. She will use whatever means from the ridiculous to the far-fetched to achieve her goal of breaking them up.
- Pops is Freeman's father, a psychologist and college professor, who inadvertently gets placed in the awkward position of counseling Angelita and her mother, when Samana mistakenly makes an appointment with his office to mediate the conflict between Angelita and her lover Freeman. Pops believes himself to be hip, but to Freeman all of his references are dated.
- Angelita is Freeman's love interest. She is a college student, whose mother immigrated to Washington Heights from the Dominican Republic in the hopes of providing a better life for her children.
- OK is Freeman's best friend and confidant. Freeman's classmate since high school and now in college, he is a budding entrepreneur, DJ and corporate mogul. In addition he is a would be ladies' man, if he could get the ladies to agree. His romantic interests include Nilsa and Malady.
- Malady is Freeman's running mate and potential love interest. She is a college student, who questions Freeman's romantic choice.
- 'Nilsa is Angelita's best friend, confidante and fellow college student. She grew up in the Bronx, in the same neighborhood her grandparents emigrated to from Puerto Rico in the 1950s.
- Julia, Angelita's cousin, is an outrageous hair stylist at a local salon.
- Nah’mean is OK's cousin's cousin. Against Freeman's wishes he is helping OK work on Freeman's campaign for student government president.

== Awards and nominations ==
Platanos Y Collard Greens is a recipient of an AUDELCO Award. Platanos has won numerous diversity awards at colleges and universities across the United States. In addition, Platanos received special recognition at the 100th Anniversary of the NAACP and has also been recognized by the Congressional Black Caucus.

== Reception ==
The New York Times called the play “A modern-day West Side Story ... has developed a huge following among people who come to see it again and again.” The New York Post wrote that “Cultures and passions collide with the poetics of Hip Hop.” Positive Community Magazine said “Platanos & Collard Greens is a spicy dish served with colorful ... side dishes of humor ... and straight up revelations that hit the spot.” La Diva Latina magazine wrote that “Platanos and Collard Greens is sweet, true fun! Bring your appetite for laughter when you go to see this novela set on stage!" Linda Armstrong of the Amsterdam News called it “a play that everyone can relate to... a Hip-Hop drama... incorporating humor and utilizing extraordinary moving, and explosive poetry. [This play] wins on all levels: it entertains, educates, and leaves one satisfied.” Caribbean Life wrote that “Moments of cutting edge insight mixed with laugh out loud humor... it will be easy to agree this show deserves to take its rightful place on Broadway as the year's new hit. Catch it soon while you still can!”
