= Mercy Aigbe =

Nigerian actress, director and businesswoman (born 1978)

- Aigbe at the 2026 Toronto International Film Festival.
- Born: Mercy Aigbe; 1 January 1978 (age 48); Edo State, Nigeria
- Citizenship: Nigerian
- Education: University of Lagos
- Occupations: Actress; model; filmmaker; producer; director
- Years active: 2001–present
- Known for: Yoruba Indigenous Movies
- Spouse: Kazim Adeoti (m. 2022)
- Children: 2
- Parents: Pa Aigbe (father); Abisola Grace Owodunni (mother)
- Website: mercyaigbegentry.com

Mercy Aigbe (born 1 January 1978) is a Nigerian actress, director, fashionista and businesswoman. She is best known for her Yoruba language movies.

== Early life ==
Mercy Aigbe was born on 1 January 1978 in Edo State to Pa Aigbe and Mrs. Abisola Grace Owodunni. She hails from Benin city which is the capital of Edo State. She is the second child in a family of five. She had her primary education at St. Francis primary school and attended Maryland Comprehensive Secondary School Ikeja, Lagos State. She is also an alumnus of The Polytechnic, Ibadan, Oyo State, where she received her OND in Financial Studies. In 2001, Mercy Aigbe graduated from University of Lagos with a degree in Theater Arts.

== Career ==
Mercy Aigbe kicked off her acting career by starring in some soap operas, including the popular TV drama series "Papa Ajasco." Professionally, Mercy joined the Nollywood industry fully in 2006 and acted in the movie that brought her into the limelight 'Ara,' a movie produced by Remi Olupo in Ibadan, Oyo State. She founded "Mercy Aigbe Gentry School of Drama" in 2016.

In 2026, Mercy Aigbe starred in the romantic drama Everything Is New Again, which premiered worldwide on 28 January and began screening in Nigerian and West African cinemas, drawing attention for its bold storytelling and Aigbe's compelling lead performance.

=== Endorsement ===
In November 2014, Mercy Aigbe was made the brand ambassador for Elephant Gold Rice. Mercy Aigbe signed a one-year deal to be the brand ambassador for Prestige Cosmetic in June 2015. In July 2016, Mercy signed an endorsement deal with Edalaf Brother Limited, an IT solution company. She was made an ambassador for a fitness company called "Shape you," the company that produces Slimming Coffee in October 2016. Mercy Aigbe, in March 2017, was made the brand ambassador for BK hair. In September 2018, She was made the brand ambassador for "Naija Taxi Services", a company that deals with transportation of people. Mercy Aigbe alongside Bose Alao and Biodun Okeowo penned an endorsement deal with a Cosmetic giant "Mary Make"

=== Filmography ===
- Satanic
- Afefe Ife (2008)
- Okanjua (2008) as Tolu
- Atunida Leyi (2009)
- Igberaga (2009) as Sunmbo
- Ihamo (2009)
- Ìpèsè (2009)
- Iró funfun (2009) as Yimisi
- Mafisere (2009)
- Oju ife (2009)
- Edaa (2010) as Shade
- The Return of Jenifa (2011)
- Osas: Omoge Benin (2012) as Osas
- Gucci Girls (2012) as Cynthia
- Ile Oko Mii (2014)
- Victims (2015) as Yeni
- Kabiosi (2015) as Bidun
- Omoge Lekki (2016)
- Loved You First (2016)
- The Screenplay (2017)
- Little Drops of Happy (2017) as Yetunde
- My Secret (2017)
- 200 Million (2018)
- Second Acts (2018)
- Lagos Real Fake Life (2018) as Jasmine
- Heaven on My Mind (film) (2018) as Bola Peters
- Wetin Women Want (2018)
- The Reunion (2019)
- 77 Bullets (2019) as Susan J.B.O / Bisola
- Kinni Igbeyawo (2020) as Rolake
- Omo Ghetto: The Saga (2020) as Prisca
- Swallow (2021) as Violet
- The Cokers (2021) as Sandra
- Ete (2021) as Lola
- Ile Alayo (2021)
- Crazy Grannies (2021) as Ewa
- Obsessions (2022) as Jane
- Romola Alakara (2022) as Romola
- My Home (2022) as Sade
- Mr Perfect (2022) as Joke
- Palava (2022) as Hajara
- Eri Ife (2022) as Eniola
- Destiny (2022) as Madam Mildred
- Gbege (2022)
- Afefeyeye (2022) as Kofoworola
- Brotherhood (2022) as Wumi Adetula
- Osato (2023) Aunty Pat
- Ololade (2023)
- The Trade (2023) as Victim's Mum
- Ada Omo Daddy (2023) as Older Motunrayo
- Aitokunrin (2024) as Radeke
- Rush Hour (2024) as Iya Ronke
- Beast of Two Worlds (2024) as Oyeyiola
- The Herd (2025)

== Awards ==
Year	Award	Category	Work	Result	Ref
2015	City People Entertainment Awards	Yoruba Movie Personality of the Year		Won	
2015	Links and Glitz World Awards	Fashion Entrepreneur of The Year		Won	
2017	Best of Nollywood Awards	Best Actress in a Lead Role –Yoruba		Nominated	
2018	Best of Nollywood Awards	Best Supporting Actress –Yoruba		Nominated	
2019	Best of Nollywood Awards	Best Supporting Actress –Yoruba		Nominated	
2023	Eko Heritage Awards	Leadership Award for Youth and Empowerment		Won	
2024	Best of Nollywood Awards	Best Supporting Actress	Ada Omo Daddy	Won	
2025	Africa Magic Viewers' Choice Awards	Best Supporting Actress	The Farmer's Bride	Won	

== Fashion and style ==
Mercy Aigbe is known for her unique style and dressing. At the 2016 Africa Magic Viewers Choice Awards, Mercy Aigbe's dress earned her great applause from fashion stakeholders. The dress was commended for its unique design. In November 2014, Aigbe launched her clothing store, Mag Divas Boutique, in Lagos, then opened another outlet in Ibadan. She was awarded Fashion Entrepreneur of The Year at Links and Glitz World Awards.

== Personal life ==
In 2013, Aigbe married a Nigerian hotelier, Lanre Gentry, after the end of her first marriage, and has two children. In 2017, she shared photos of herself after allegedly being assaulted by her husband. She consequently separated from her second husband due to claims of domestic violence, and started a campaign against it. Mercy Aigbe acquired a multi-million naira mansion in 2018.

In 2022, she married Kazim Adeoti, popularly known as Adekaz. In 2023, Mercy converted to Islam and changed her name to Hajiya Meena.

== See also ==
- List of Nigerian actors
