= Toka McBaror =

Nigerian movie producer, director

- Born: Toka McBaror; Kaduna, Nigeria
- Occupations: Film director; movie producer; music video director; cinematographer
- Years active: 1998-present
- Known for: The Millions (film) (2019); The Island; Merry Men: The Real Yoruba Demons (2018); Kada River (2018); Lotanna (2017)
- Awards: See below

Toka McBaror is a Nigerian filmmaker, producer, movie and music video director born, raised and is based in Kaduna, Kaduna State, Nigeria but originally from Delta State. He received an award nomination for Kada River at the 2018 Toronto International Nollywood Film Festival in Canada, and six award wins for the film, Lotanna including: Best Film, Best Director, Best Cinematography, Best Art Director, Best Costume and Best Sound Editor at the 2017 Golden Movie Awards.

McBaror also has to his awards credits, "Best African Film" and "Best Nollywood Director" from the 2018 Toronto International Nollywood Film Festival, TINFF, which took place in Toronto, Canada, for the movie The Island. He was again nominated for the "Best Cinematography" and "Best Director" categories at the ZAFAA Global Awards, for his 2017 movie, Lotanna.

== Career ==
In 2011, Mcbaror directed the Nigerian singer, J'odie's musical video, "Kuchi Kuchi (Oh Baby)".

He directed the film, Blogger's Wife, released to the Nigerian cinemas on Friday, February 10, 2017. The film was produced by Seun Oloketuyi, featuring Nollywood actors and actresses like Segun Arinze, Adejumoke Aderounmu, Deyemi Okanlawon, Ijeoma Grace Agu and Adeniyi Johnson. Still in 2017, Kada River, a film he produced, was nominated for an award at the Nollywood Film Festival in Toronto, Canada. At the 2017 Golden Movie Awards, he was nominated in six categories, including: Best Film, Best Director, Best Cinematography, Best Art Director, Best Costume, Best Sound Editor.

In August 2018, the movie he directed, The Island was awarded "Best African Film" and he was awarded "Best Nollywood Director" at the Toronto International Nollywood Film Festival, TIFF, which took place in Toronto, Canada. In September of the same year, he directed the movie, Merry Men: The Real Yoruba Demons by Ayo Makun, a popular Nigerian comedian. He was again nominated for the "Best Cinematography" and "Best Director" categories at the ZAFAA Global Awards, for his 2017 movie, Lotanna.

In 2019, he released an action Crime TV Series titled, Paper Boat.

In early 2020, he directed Lilian Afegbai's first film of the year titled, Double Strings. Later on February 22 at a press conference in Abuja, he announced auditions for his movie titled, Red Caravan, which he would direct and co-produce, with an estimated production cost of N61 million, to be shot in Kaduna State. The film centers on epilepsy and is set in the 1880s, at a period when slave trade thrived and is to be acted by about 600 actors and actresses. During the Covid-19 outbreak, McBaror released a web series of short films entitled, The Chronicles, aimed at spreading public awareness on the Coronavirus disease.

By 2021, his first ever attempt at horror movie production, a movie titled Creepy Lives Here had its official trailer released in January starring Afeez Oyetoro, Nancy Isime, Bimbo Ademoye, ex Big Brother Naija (season 3) housemate Temidayo Adenibuyan aka Teddy A, Beverly Osu, and Mike Godson. By February, audiences had a first look at Underbelly, which stars Nollywood notable acts like Stan Nze, Femi Adebayo, Ali Nuhu, Maryam Booth and Kunle Coker.

In 2023, he directed Dark October, a film centered on the true life event of the lynching of four young Nigerian students from University of Port Harcourt, who were falsely accused of theft in Aluu area of Port Harcourt popularly known as Aluu Four lynching.

== Filmography ==
=== Music ===
Year	Title	Singer	Role	Ref.
2011	"Kuchi Kuchi (Oh Baby)"	J'odie	director	
2019	"Power Rangers"	Teni (singer)	director	
2020	"Under The Sky"	Praiz	director	

=== Film ===
Year	Title	Actors	Role	Ref.
2024	The Waiter	Regina Daniels, Deyemi Okanlawan, Ayo Makun, Shaffy Bello, RMD	director	
2023	Dark October	Chuks Joseph, Boman Bognet, Oge Gabriel, Favour Ben, Prince David	director	
2022	Almajiri	Ayo Makun, Alexx Ekubo, Asabe Madaki	director	
2021	Underbelly	Kunle Coker, Martins David, Femi Adebayo, Akume Akume, Stan Nze	director	
2021	Creepy Lives Here		director	
2020	Double Strings	Lilian Afegbai, Steve Asinobi, Ushbebe Comedian, Victor Decker	director	
2019	Paper Boat		director	
2019	The Millions	Toyin Abraham, Vera Chidera, Etinosa Idemudia	co-director	
2019	Made in Heaven	Toyin Abraham, Dauda Adewale, Cassie Daniel, Eso Dike, Lasisi Elenu	director	
2018	Merry Men: The Real Yoruba Demons	Segun Arinze, Fathia Balogun, Falz, Nancy Isime	director	
2018	The Island	Femi Adebayo, Segun Arinze, Tokunbor Idowu	director	
2018	Kada River	Fella Makafui, Chris Okagbue, Rachael Oniga, Joke Silva	director • co-producer	
2017	Lotanna	Liz Benson, Chris Attoh, Henry Adofo, Jide Kosoko, Bimbo Manuel	director	
2017	Blogger's Wife		director	
2015	Ikogosi	Kunle Adetoba, Didi Ekanem, Chelsea Eze, Emem Isaac	director • producer	
2014	Cobweb Tomorrow		director	

=== Web/TV Series ===
Year	Title	Role	Ref.
2020	The Chronicles	director	

== Awards and nominations ==
Year	Event	Prize	Recipient	Result
2018	ZAFAA	Best cinematography	Himself	Nominated
2018	ZAFAA	Best director	Himself	Nominated
2018	TINFF	Best Nollywood director	Himself	Won
2017	GMA	Best Film	Lotanna	Won
2017	GMA	Best Director	Himself (for Lotanna)	Won
2017	GMA	Best Cinematography	Himself (for Lotanna)	Won
2017	GMA	Best Art Director	Himself (for Lotanna)	Won
2017	GMA	Best Costume	Lotanna	Won
2017	GMA	Best Sound Editor	Himself	Won
