= Chris Okagbue =

Nigerian actor and model

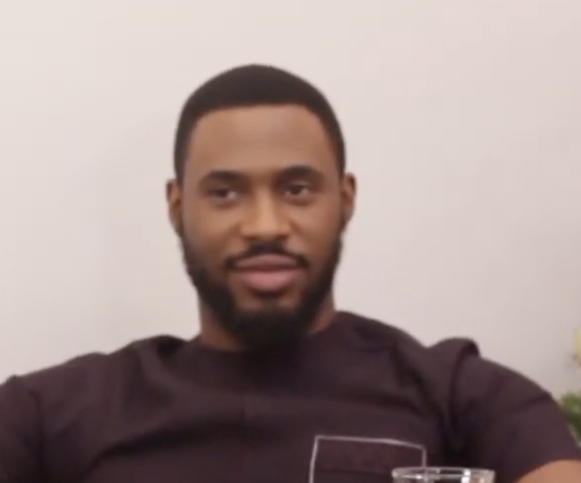
- Fashion Shoot for David Zala clothing line
- Born: Okechukwu Christopher Ofala Okechukwu Okagbue; 23 June 1987 (age 39); Nigeria
- Occupations: actor, model, movie producer, reality TV star
- Years active: 2004–present
- Known for: Gulder Ultimate Search season 8
- Parents: Father: Ofala Okechukwu Alfonsus Okagbue; Mother: Ogechukwu Clara Okagbue
- Modeling information
- Height: 5 ft 11 in (180 cm)

Chris Okagbue (//; born Okechukwu Christopher Ofala Okechukwu Okagbue, 23 June 1987) is a Nigerian model, actor, movie producer, and reality television star. He was the winner of the Gulder Ultimate Search season 8 reality show. He is of the Igbo tribe and is the son of the former Obi of Onitsha.

== Background and education ==
Okagbue is from Onitsha in Anambra state. He is a twin. He was born into the royal family of the former Obi of Onitsha, the late H.R.H. Obi Ofala Okechukwu Okagbue and Ogechukwu Clara Okagbue, on 23 June 1987. His parents have six children, namely his elder sister Sandra Okagbue who is a former model and beauty queen, his twin brother Christian, and three younger sisters, Jane, Christabel and Bella. He has a degree in sociology from the University of Lagos.

== Career ==
His first venture into show business was as a model in 2004, when he appeared in commercials for brands like Cadbury Plc, MTN, Nigerian Breweries, Coca-Cola and Airtel at age 17. He moved into acting in 2007 when he was given a part after accompanying friends to an audition and decided to give it a try. He then appeared as Preye Pepple in the TV series The Station. The series was directed by Achor Yusuf who also gave him his second acting role as Lucky Edeghor in the TV series The Maze. Okagbue took a break from acting for a while until he found a job he had taken a liking to, TV presenting. He had a short spell with Koga Studios and at the time had covered the live red carpet of notable events such as the launch of Wizkid's first album, Superstar, Yemi Sax's Sax Appeal concert and DJ Jimmy Jatt's Jimmy's Jumpoff concert. He returned to acting shortly after as Victor in the TV series Secrets and Scandals. His break came when he was given the role of Emil Haruna in the M-NET TV series Tinsel.

He made his first appearance in a cinema film with a small role in the movie A Wish, followed by the movie Playing Safe, both directed by Elvis Chuks. His biggest role is as the lead character in Lotanna. He played the role of Lotanna in the film which starred the Ghanaian actress Ama K. Abebrese, Jide Kosoko, Bimbo Manuel, Victor Olaotan and Liz Benson.

Okagbue has starred in movies with Joke Silva, Fella Makafui, Tonto Dike, Ini Edo, Ama K. Abebrese, Jide Kosoko, Martha Ankomah, Bimbo Manuel, Ngozi Ezeonu, Victor Olaotan and Liz Benson amongst others, and has worked extensively with directors like Obi Emelonye, Elvis Chuks, Toka Mcbaror, Victor Sanchez Aghahowa, Achor Yusuf, James Omokwe and Moses Inwang.

In 2012, Okagbue was made a brand ambassador for Passion Energy Drink, by Orange Drugs Limited. He appeared in both TV and print commercials for the brand. In 2018, Okagbue was announced as on official Festival Ambassador by the Nollywood Travel Film Festival for the 2018 edition of the festival.

== Gulder Ultimate Search 8 winner ==
Okagbue won season 8 of the reality show Gulder Ultimate Search in 2011. The show was held in the Kukuruku Hills in Egbetua quarters, Akoko-Edo of Edo State and was themed "The Contest of Champions". The task was to find the second lost helmet of General Maximilian Of the initial 30 contenders, ten champions were picked to appear on the show. Okagbue emerged as the winner. His prizes as winner included seven million Nigerian naira, an SUV and a ₦500,000 wardrobe allowance for one year.

== Personal life ==
Okagbue has an unreserved love for the city of Paris and French people in general. He explained in an interview with The Punch newspaper about his experience during a family vacation to France that he believes Paris is called the "City of Love" because the French people are friendly and romantic.

== Filmography ==
=== Film ===
Year	Film	Director	Role	Notes
2012	A Wish	Elvis Chuks	Bob	
2013	Playing Safe	Elvis Chuks	Henry	
2014	The Deal	Solomon Macauley	Victor	
2014	Superstar Me	Sampson 'Osmosis' Afolabi-Johnson	Ben	
2015	Mixed Feelings	Seun 'Sheffy' Shonoiki	Chuks	
2015	27	Tope Alake	Agu	
2015	Fastlane	Abiodun Williams	Akin Joe	
2015	40 Days	Phil Efe Bernard	Efe	
2016	#TDMP: The Dance Movie Project	Idahosa Osagie	Eddy/Shakespeare	
2016	Caged Hearts	Nwaogburu Nelson Jombo	Benson	
2016	Hidden Truth	Nwaogburu Nelson Jombo	Benjamin	
2016	Colourless	Sobe Charles Umeh	Ralph Okai	
2016	Lotanna	Toka Mcbaror	Lotanna	Associate Producer: Chris Okagbue
2017	Kada River	Toka Mcbaror	Jerome	
2017	Mentally	James Abinibi	Awe	
2017	The Reason It's You	Alaundra Ada Dikesee	Leo	
2017	Mummy Dearest 2: The Wedding	Willis Ikedum	As himself	Guest appearance
2018	Diana	Okey Zubelu Okoh	Izu	
2018	Dark Shades	Iyua Alaha	Andrew	
2018	Zoe	Forin-Clay Ejeh	Zoe's Dad	
2018	The Washerman	Charles Uwagbai	Duke	
2018	Drowning	Florence Nkeng	Jeffrey	
2019	Swapped	Toka Mcbaror	Richard	
2019	Love and Lust	Henry Okoro	Chris	
2019	The Moles	Uche Chukwu	Gerald	
2019	Rickety	Oluchi Nsofor	Femi	
2019	The Bling Lagosians	Bolanle Austen-Peters	Igbo Investor	
2019	For Old Time' Sake	Moses Inwang	Andrew	
	Drawing Strength	Dimbo Atiya	Sota Saka	
2021	Sanitation Day	Seyi Babatope	Jonah	
2022	Sham to Glam	Akin-Tijani Balogun	Anthony	Comedy / Romance
2022	Finding Odera	Charles Uwagbai	Olisa	Drama
2023	Next Door Secret	Michael Jaja	Melvin	Drama
2023	Stuck with Us	Mamuzo Sam Oyas	Obinna	Drama
2024	My Gen-Z Stepfather	Eky F. Ugede	Dotun	Comedy

=== Television ===
Year	Film	Director	Role	Notes
2007	The Station	Achor Yusuf	Preye Pepple	
2008	The Maze	Achor Yusuf	Lucky Edeghor	
2011	Gulder Ultimate Search reality TV show, season 8		As himself/winner of season 8	
2012	Secrets and Scandals	Elvis Chucks	Victor	
2012	Tinsel	Victor Sanchez Aghahowa	Emil Haruna	TV series still running
2013	AY's Crib		As himself	Guest appearance
2015	The Calabash	Obi Emelonye	Kelvin Peters	
2016	Kala & Jamal	John Njamah	Jamal	
2016	The Condo	Yemi Morafa	Brian	
2017	Hush	Tope Oshin	Oz	
2018	Ajoche	James Omokwe	Ekere	
2019	Backseat	Victor Sanchez Aghahowa	Tosan	

== Awards and nominations ==
=== As a model ===
His awards and nominations list for modeling and fashion includes:

- The 9ja Top Models Awards 2008
- Nigerian Models Achievers Awards: Model Of The Year 2009
- Peak Awards Model Of The Year 2010
- Peak Awards Model Of The Year 2012
- Nigerian Models Achievers Awards: Fast-Rising Model Actor 2014
- Lagos Fashion Awards 2015: Special Recognition For Most Fashionable TV Personality Of The Year
- Nigerian Icon Fashion Awards: Personality Fashion Icon Of The Year 2015
- Green October Event Awards: Most Fashionable Male Celebrity 2017

=== As an actor ===
- Links Achievers Awards: Fast-Rising Actor 2015
- Golden Movie Awards: Golden Actor (Drama) 2017 - nominated
- City People Movie Awards: Most Promising Actor of the Year (English) 2017 - nominated
- Nigeria Achievers Awards: Next Rated Actor Of The Year 2017 - nominated
- Zulu African Film Academy Awards: Best Newcomer for the film Lotanna 2018

=== Others ===
- MoreKlue All Youth Awards Africa For Style: Influencer Of The Year 2018
- African Entertainment Legend Awards: Special Recognition Awards For Achievements In Entertainment
- Nigerian Designers Awards: Social Media Brand Influencer 2018

== See also ==
- List of Nigerian actors
- List of Nigerian film producers
