= Emmanuel Seun Oyeleke =

Photographer, Archer

- Born: 26 August 1988 (age 38); Ibadan, Oyo State
- Citizenship: Nigerian
- Education: Lead City University (BS.c in Computer Science)

Emmanuel Seun Oyeleke(Born, August 26, 1988) is a Nigerian creative photographer, artist, archer, and founder of Zen Archery. His work has earned him international recognition as a Canon Ambassador

== Early life and education ==
Born in Ibadan, Oyo State, to a family of four, with Emmanuel being the first child. He attended The Polytechnic, Ibadan, where he earned an Ordinary National Diploma in Computer Science, before obtaining a Bachelor's degree in Computer Science from Lead City University.

== Photography ==
=== Cedar Magazine ===
In 2015 Emmanuel started Cedar Magazine, a project that project emphasizes fashion, beauty and lifestyle, the electronic magazine is driven by the passion to showcase the growing talents of individuals growing in what they do and also to showcase his love for photography.

The magazine has featured Ugandan Model Ramona Fauziah Nanyombi, Claire Idera, Osa Seven, Victor Olaotan, Chris Attoh, and Ama K Abebrese.

=== The Humanist ===
In April 2019 Emmanuel held "The Humanist" in Lagos, Nigeria, a photography exhibition that looks at exploring human elements and the active nature of human creativity.

=== Project X ===
In 2022 Emmaunel co initiated Project X to celebrate a decade of photography. It was initiated alongside Aham Ibeleme, and Yagazie Eguare. The Inititaive was created to support and teach young and upcoming photographers about Photograghy and the Business of Photography.

=== Notable photographs ===
- In 2022 Emmanuel photographed the wedding of Nigeria's former President Muhmmadu Buhari.
- In 2015 Emmanuel collaborated with Annie Macaulay in a photograph to raise awareness against breast cancer.
- In 2017 he photographed in Collaboration with Make Up Artist Leylarh Cadne and Model Aduke Bey in a Fruity Editorial titled "FRUITY LOOKS".
- To honor women, in 2022 Emmanuel photographed Beverly Naya in honour of women's month.

== Archery career ==
Emmanuel is ranked number 134 in the Compound Men category by the World Archery Federation and is the National Captain of the Nigeria Archery Team. In 2025, Emmanuel won a gold medal in the Compound Men's category of the Zen Archery International Tournament, Lagos. He also won gold at the African Run Archery in 2025. In July 2026, Emmanuel and Hareke Evans, representing Nigeria, won silver in the mixed compound team event at the African Archery Championships, Oran, Algeria.

In February 2026, Emmanuel was appointed Director of Marketing by the Nigeria Archery Federation.

=== Zen archery ===
In 2023 Emmanuel founded the Zen Archery Club, Lagos with aim of building world class archers to represent Nigeria at the Global Stage.

== Personal life ==
Emmanuel is married to Nigeria model and fashion designer Nanfe Jemimah.
