= Gbemi Olateru Olagbegi =

Nigerian on air personality

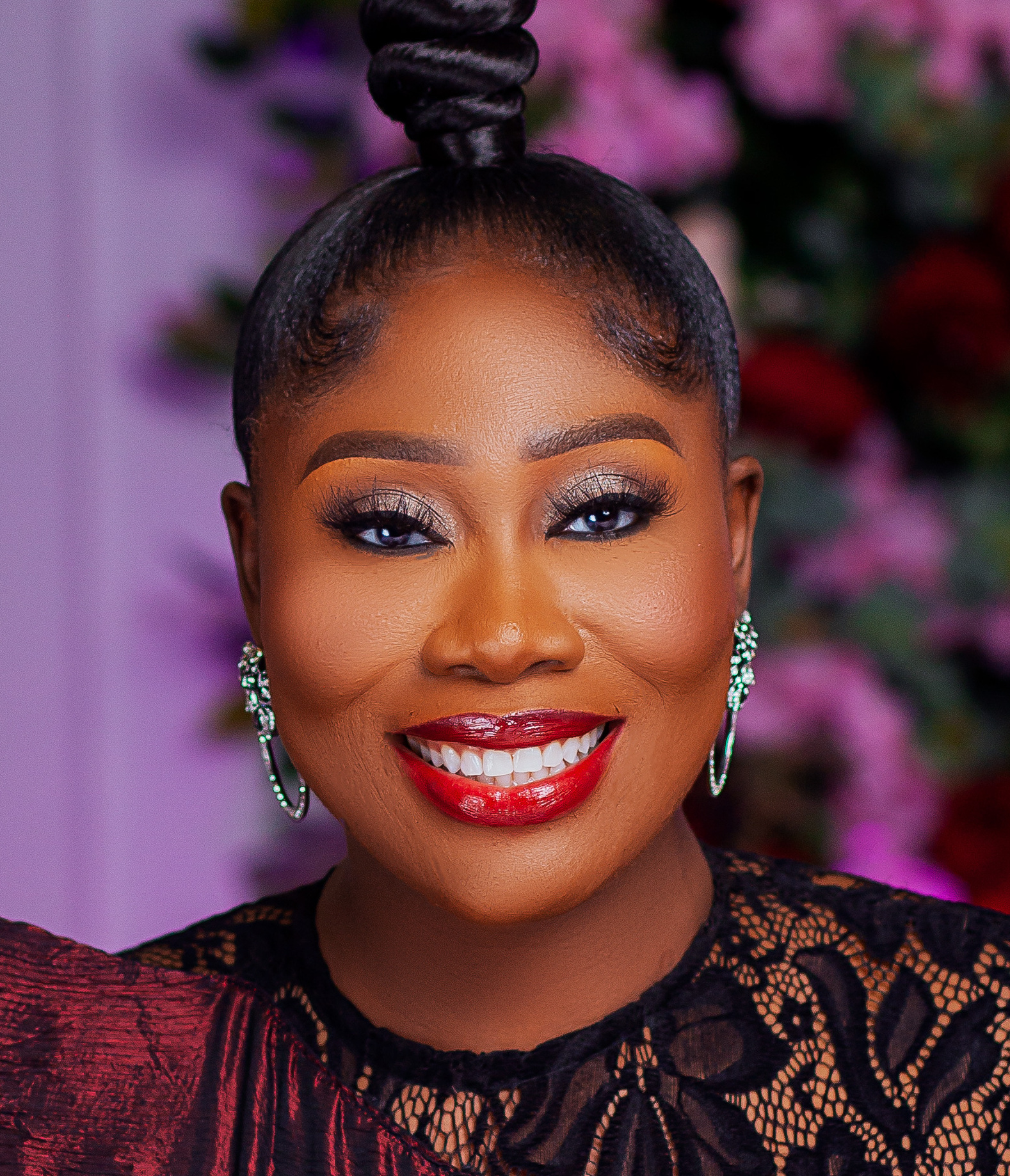
- Gbemi on Off Air with Gbemi and Toolz in 2023
- Born: Gbemi Olateru Olagbegi; 18 July 1984 (age 42); Surulere, Lagos, Nigeria
- Education: Pan-African University, Lagos (MSc, Media & Comm), Oakland University, Rochester (BA, Comm)
- Occupations: Media personality, Executive Producer, Group VP, Marketing.
- Years active: 2005–present
- Spouse: Femisoro Ajayi (m. 2018)
- Relatives: Bukunyi Olateru-Olagbegi

Gbemi Olateru Olagbegi (born 18 July 1984) is a Nigerian former broadcaster at The Beat 99.9 FM (she resigned in December 2021), entrepreneur and co-host of "Off-Air with Gbemi & Toolz" podcast. Gbemi is the granddaughter of late Olowo of Owo Sir Olateru-Olagbegi II KBE. In 2008, Gbemi won the on-air personality of the year at the Future Awards Africa. In 2015, Gbemi founded Gbemisoke shoes. A shoe line created for women with difficulties in shopping for the right shoe size. At the fifth edition of the Arise Fashion Week, Lagos in 2018, Gbemi walked the runway for FIA Factory. In 2019, Gbemi became one of the faces from Megalectrics Ltd for Rémy Martin.

== Early life ==
Gbemi was born on July 18, 1984, to Banke and Yemi Olateru-Olagbegi in St. Nicholas Hospital, Lagos. She attended Pampers Private School, Surulere, The Nigerian Navy Secondary School, Ojo between 1993 and 1997 then continued her secondary school education at Queens College, Yaba where she graduated in 2000. She obtained a B.A. in communications at Oakland University, Rochester and MSc. in Media and Communications from Pan-Atlantic University, Lagos.

== Career ==
=== Broadcasting career ===
After school, Gbemi served as a member of the youth corp at the Nigerian Television Authority, NTA 2 channel 5, Victoria Island before she moved to Cool FM Nigeria in 2005 where she hosted the Good Morning Nigeria show with the late Dan Foster for a year. In 2006, Gbemi hosted the Midday Oasis until 2009 when she left Cool Fm for The Beat 99.9 FM. Gbemi was the deputy program director at Beat FM from 2011 to 2016 and Program Director to the sister-company, Naija FM 102.7 from 2011 to 2017. She left radio in December 2021.

=== Entrepreneur career ===
She is known to be a serial entrepreneur. In 2015, Gbemi founded her shoe line, Gbemisoke Shoes, an idea born out of her personal experience when shopping for shoes.

=== Acting career ===
Gbemi's first film appearance was in 2017, in a web series titled Our Best Friend's Wedding. She played the role of Kemi in the romantic dramedy by The Naked Convos in collaboration with RedTv. It starred Oreka Godis, Adebola Olowu, Chris Attoh and lasted for two seasons. In 2020, she featured in another short film by The Naked Convos titled Heaven Baby.

=== TNC ===
After Gbemi Olateru-Olagbegi left radio on 24 December 2021, she was appointed as co-founder and co-executive producer of one of Africa's entertainment startups, TNC Africa. TNC Africa is a digital-focused TV and film production company. it was launched in January 2021 by Olawale Adetula and Daniel Aideyan.

=== Wakanow Group ===
On 1 February 2023, Gbemi Olateru-Olagbegi announced her appointment as Group VP, Marketing at Wakanow Group. Gbemi supervises and develop marketing strategies for the brands within her portfolio, including Wakanow and Kalabash.

== Personal life ==
Gbemi is a member of the royal Olagbegi Family of Owo, Ondo State. She has three brothers, Olatokunbo Olateru-Olagbegi, Bukunyi Olateru-Olagbegi and Adenola Olateru-Olagbegi and is happily married to Femisoro Ajayi.

== Career Timeline ==
- 2005-2006: Good Morning Nigeria Show, Cool FM Nigeria Co-host
- 2006-2009: Midday Oasis, Cool FM Nigeria Host
- 2009–2021: Drive Time Show, The Beat 99.9 FM, Lagos Host
- 2011-2017: Program Director - Naija FM 102.7, Lagos
- 2011-2016: Deputy Program Director - The Beat 99.9 FM Lagos
- 2021–Present: Executive Producer, TNC
- 2023–Present: VP Marketing, WakaNow Group

== Notable Interviews ==
- Goodluck Ebele Jonathan
- Davido
- Wizkid
- Cardi B
- Kim Kardashian
- Future
- Jidenna
- Fabulous
- Angela Simmons
- Tim Westwood

== Filmography ==
Gbemi Olateru-Olagbegi series work
Year	Title	Role	Notes
2017	Our Best Friend's Wedding S1	Kemi	
2020	Heaven Baby	Sandra	
2021	Our Best Friend's Wedding S2	Kemi	

== Awards and nominations ==
She won the City People Awards & The Nigerian Media Merit Awards in 2016 for On Air Personality of the Year.

Year	Award	Category	Result	Ref
2008	The Future Awards Africa	On Air Personality of the Year	Won	
2008	Dynamix Awards	Radio Presenter of the Year	Won	
2008	Green Awards of Excellence	Radio Category	Won	
2009	Exquisite Lady of the Year Award	Best Female Radio Presenter	Won	
2010	The Future Awards Africa	On Air Personality of the Year	Nominated	
2015	Nickelodeon Kids Choice Awards	Favourite Nigerian On-Air Personality	Nominated	
2016	Exquisite Lady of the Year Award	On Air Personality of the Year	Won	
2016	The Nigerian Media Merit Awards	On Air Personality of the Year	Won	
2021	Net Honours	Most Popular Media Personality (female)	Nominated	
