= Victoria Lebene =

Ghanaian actress

Victoria Lebene Osafo-Nkansah
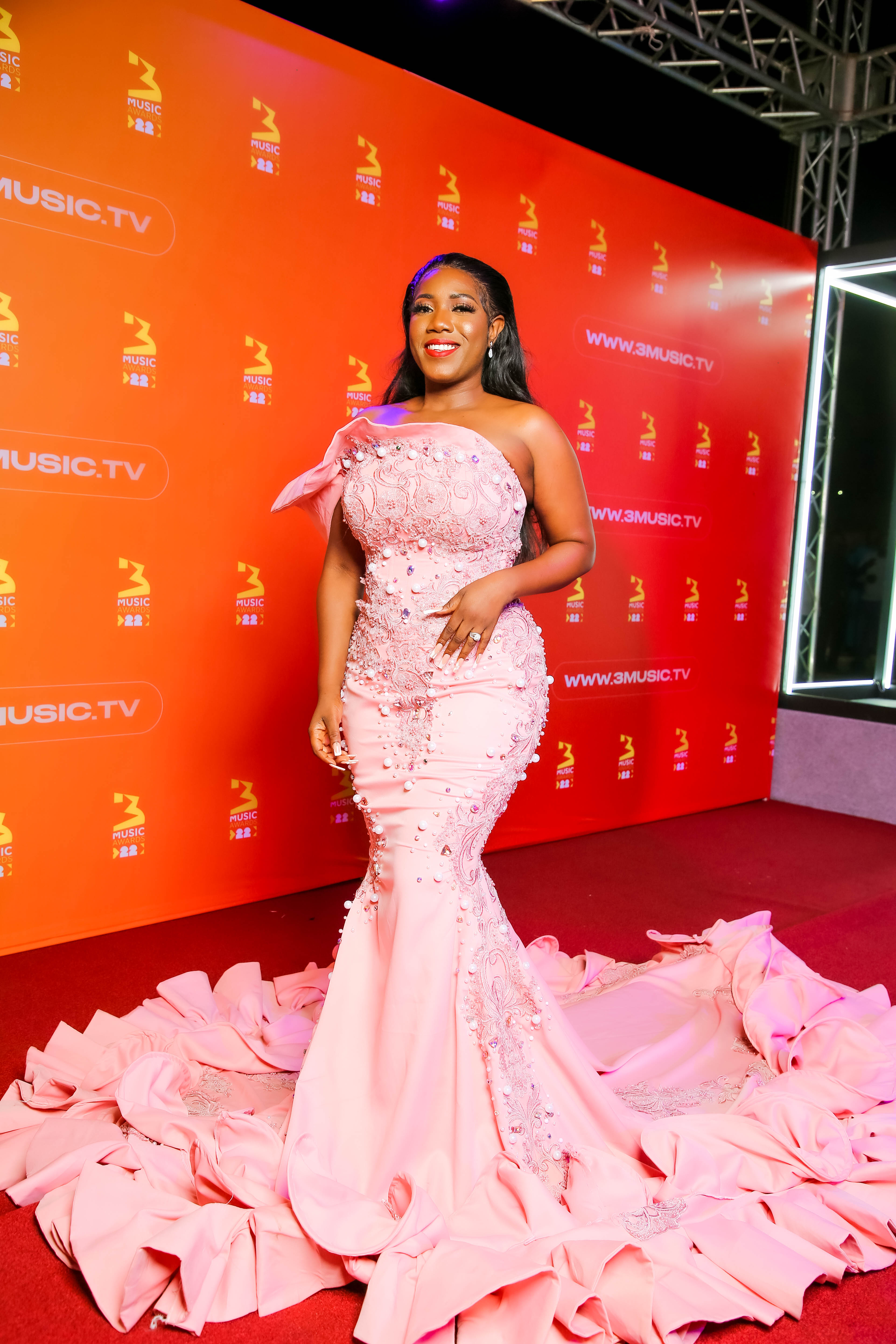
- Victoria at 3 Music Awards
- Born: 30 July 1989 (age 36); Accra, Ghana
- Occupations: Actress, Entrepreneur
- Years active: 2012–present
- Partner: Eugene Osafo-Nkansah

Victoria Lebene Osafo-Nkansah (born July 30, 1989), also known as Victoria Lebene, is a Ghanaian actress, journalist and entrepreneur.

== Early life and education ==
Lebene was born in Accra and attended Zenith University College, where she studied human resource management. She later attended the African University College of Communications, where she acquired a bachelor's degree in development communications.

== Career ==
Lebene made her acting debut in 2012, when she was featured in the Ghanaian film series Ultimate Story. She has gone on to play roles in Miser, A Sting in a Tale, Jackie Goes to School, Broken Mirror, Accra Girls, Honey Moon, Bitter Sweet Wine, Babaani, and Ramadan.

She has worked in journalism and news production at GHOne TV. She hosted the Golden Movie Awards Red carpet in 2019, and was one of the red carpet hosts at the 3Music Awards 2022.

== Awards and nominations ==
Year	Event	Prize	Recipient	Result
2017	2017 Golden Movie Awards	Golden Short Film of the Year Award	Bitter Sweet Wine	Won
2018	Scream Awards	Breakout Actor of the Year	Breakout Actor of the Year	Won
2018	C-Baze Awards	Student Favorite Actress of the Year	Student Favorite Actress of the Year	Won

== Filmography ==
- Deadly Deals
- Ghana Single Ladies
- Jackie Goes to School
- Broken Mirror (2014) as Angela
- The Honeymoon Trip (2018) as Ore
- Baabani
- My Name is Ramadan (2018)
- Bitter Sweet Wine (2017) as Samantha
- Freedom and Justice (2021) as Sarah

== Personal life ==
Victoria is married to Ghanaian entertainment journalist Eugene Osafo-Nkansah and they have two children. Her father is S.P Victor Mekpeh, who is a retired chief superintendent officer of Ghana Prisons Service.

== Philanthropy ==
In July 2017, Victoria with some of her friends presented raw and processed food items, beverages, clothes, toiletries and bottled water to the Dzorwulu Special Home in Accra.
