= Stanley Isokoh Edirin =

Stanley Isokoh Edirin, professionally known as Oduma or Honourable Zaddy, is a Nigerian comedian, Nollywood actor, and filmmaker. He is the founder of SOKOH TV, a digital comedy and entertainment brand, and serves as the CEO of Soko Media Integrated Services Ltd.

== Career ==
Edirin initially gained widespread recognition in the Nigerian entertainment landscape for his role as Oduma in the Akpan and Oduma comedy series produced by Wale Adenuga Productions. He credited his casting in Akpan and Oduma around 2012–2013 with helping him refine his comedic style, having previously supported himself as a scriptwriter while auditioning for acting roles in Lagos. During this period, he wrote for several Nigerian television productions, including AY's Crib, Professor Johnbull, and the M-Net series Do-Good, and was a pioneer writer on My Flatmates.

He transitioned further into mainstream Nollywood films and digital production, establishing SOKOH TV. Through his media outfit, he creates and produces original social satires, political comedies, and family dramas focusing on everyday Nigerian governance, law enforcement, and lifestyle experiences. His productions have accumulated a combined digital audience across major social video platforms. His recurring character "Honourable Zaddy", built around the sketch "Power to the People", began as a single satirical sketch created around Nigeria's general elections and grew into an ongoing series after gaining unexpected popularity online. Edirin has said the character is scripted and distinct from his private life, which he keeps largely out of public view.

== Personal life ==
Edirin is a Christian. He is of Urhobo ethnicity from the Niger Delta region, and has said his cultural background has directly shaped his comedic style. He is married to Anita Brown Isokoh, who is from Burkina Faso, and the couple has two children. Beyond entertainment, he has said he runs a trucking business and maintains an interest in poultry farming.

== Filmography ==
=== Mainstream films ===
- ATM (2016) — Writer, Actor
- Three Wise Men (2016) — Writer, Actor (as Chenedoro)
- Size 12 (2019) — Writer
- A Million Voices (2021–2022) — TV Mini Series, Actor (as Umukoro)
