= Our Best Friend's Wedding =

Nigerian TV series

- OBFW First Season cover
- Also known as: OBFW
- Genre: Drama
- Created by: Olawale Adetula
- Written by: Chidi Ifeanyi Barbara (HW.); Daniel Aideyan; Ikechuckwu Jerry Ossai; Olawale Adetula; Lani Aisida; Abosi Ogba
- Story by: Olawale Adetula; Christopher Ogbuehi
- Directed by: Ikechuckwu Jerry Ossai; Belinda Agedah Yanga
- Starring: Gbemi Olateru Olagbegi; Adebola Olowu; Oreka Godis; Chris Attoh; Timi Charles-Fadipe; Marycolette Unamka; Wendy Lawal; Sarah Boulos; Theo Lawson
- Country of origin: Nigeria
- Original language: English
- No. of seasons: 2
- No. of episodes: 23

Production
- Executive producers: Bola Atta; Olawale Adetula; Obinna Okerekeocha
- Producers: Idakula Sobogun Lydia; Belinda Agedah Yanga; Tolulope Akintade Akintan
- Editors: Arinze Emenike; Frank Ossai
- Production company: The Naked Convos

Original release
- Network: RedTV; TCN Africa
- Release: 27 January 2017 – December 31, 2021

Our Best Friend's Wedding (abbreviated as OBFW) is a 2017 RedTV, and TCN Africa original Nigerian Drama web series, created by Olawale Adetula, and executively produced by Olawale Adetula, and Bola Atta, for the first season, with Obinna Okerekeocha joining the second season as an executive producer, starring Gbemi Olateru Olagbegi, Adebola Olowu, Oreka Godis, Chris Attoh, Timi Charles-Fadipe, Marycolette Unamka, Wendy Lawal, Sarah Boulos, and Theo Lawson in the first season, with Maurice Sam, Martha Ehinome, Oshuwa Imoyo Tunde, Marycolette Unamka, Eso Dike, and Adekanla Desalu, joining the main cast for the second season.

== Plot ==
Our Best Friend's Wedding tells the story of a young man who panics and buys an engagement ring on a whim. He recruits his two female best friends to help him go through a list of potential candidates and sets off a series of events that leads to a wedding. In the second season, three best friends, Charles, Jade, and Kemi navigate life and adulthood and the emotional rollercoaster that comes from unrequited love, betrayal, and true friendship.

== Cast ==
=== Main ===
- Gbemi Olateru Olagbegi as Kemi - (Season 1 and 2)
- Adebola Olowu as Charles Effiong - (Season 1)
- Oreka Godis as Jade - (Season 1)
- Chris Attoh as Tunde - (Season 1)
- Timi Charles-Fadipe as Promise - (Season 1)
- Marycolette Unamka as Onome - (Season 1)
- Wendy Lawal as Tolu - (Season 1)
- Sarah Boulos as Gloria Effiong - (Season 1)
- Theo Lawson as Dr. Arinze - (Season 1)
- Sunshine Rosman as Clara - (Season 2)
- Maurice Sam as Charles - (Season 2)
- Martha Ehinome as Jade - (Season 2)
- Oshuwa Imoyo Tunde as Muna - (Season 2)
- Marycolette Unamka as Onome - (Season 2)
- Eso Dike as Ekeng - (Season 2)
- Adekanla Desalu as Captain - (Season 2)

=== Guest ===
- Kiki Omeili as Tara - (Season 1)
- Bolanle Olukanni as Darlene - (Season 1)
- Diwari Peterside as Yetunde - (Season 1)
- Ijeoma Aniebo as Chioma - (Season 1)
- Chiemela Azurunwa as - (Season 1)
- Aramide as Bukola - (Season 1)
- Osayi Uzamere as Tega - (Season 1)
- Timi Sikoki as Captain - (Season 1)
- Omoye Uzamere as Shayo - (Season 1)
- Toyin Oshinaike as Civil Servant - (Season 1)
- Martins Iwuagwu as Mr Kayode (Landlord) - (Season 1)
- John Njamah as Shola Alabi - (Season 2)
- Judah Osas Odejide as Kolade - (Season 2)
- Emelda Eghebi as Koyinsola - (Season 2)
- Tunbosun Aiyedehin as Kemi's Mom - (Season 2)
- Belinda Agedah Yanga as Tamuno - (Season 2)
- Boman Bognet as Sam - (Season 2)
- Chidinma Nebo as Vanessa - (Season 2)

== Episode ==
Season	Episodes	Originally released	
Season	Episodes	First released	Last released
1	11	January 27, 2017	April 6, 2017
2	12	October 14, 2021	December 31, 2021

=== Season 1 (2017) ===
No.	Title	Directed by	Written by	Original release date
1	"Wifey New Year"	Ikechuckwu Jerry Ossai	Daniel Aideyan; Ikechuckwu Jerry Ossai	27 January 2017
Charles panics after visiting his mom, buys a ring on a whim and recruits his two girlfriends, Jade and Kemi to help him find his lucky bride. Promise throws a new year’s Eve party and offers Charles support upon learning of his decision to marry.
2	"Thirsty Tara"	Ikechuckwu Jerry Ossai	Daniel Aideyan; Ikechuckwu Jerry Ossai	2 February 2017
Kemi and Jade help Charles put a plan together on how to find his bride even though he is distracted by a surprise encounter he had at work. We also get to meet Tara and discover why she is thirsty.
3	"Broken Promise"	Ikechuckwu Jerry Ossai	Daniel Aideyan; Ikechuckwu Jerry Ossai	9 February 2017
Kemi and Jade visit Charles to get feedback on his first date and things get heated. Charles visits his mom to confront her about his fears and Promise seems to have gotten himself in a lot of trouble.
4	"Truce"	Ikechuckwu Jerry Ossai	Daniel Aideyan; Ikechuckwu Jerry Ossai	16 February 2017
Charles, Kemi and Jade are at the hospital waiting for news on Promise and they bump into one of the ladies on Charles' list. Charles gets another surprise at work when his boss asks him to join a meeting with Onome.
5	"Retribution"	Ikechuckwu Jerry Ossai	Daniel Aideyan; Ikechuckwu Jerry Ossai	23 February 2017
Onome makes an interesting proposal to Charles. Jade's business proposal gets turned down by a government official and Charles goes on a date with Shayo.
6	"Like a Brother"	Ikechuckwu Jerry Ossai	Daniel Aideyan; Ikechuckwu Jerry Ossai	2 March 2017
Tunde visits Jade where he meets Kemi and Charles but the visit ends abruptly as he leaves to attend to an emergency. Charles goes on a date with Yetunde and later gets a surprise visitor.
7	"Safe Space"	Ikechuckwu Jerry Ossai	Daniel Aideyan; Ikechuckwu Jerry Ossai	9 March 2017
Jade and Tunde go out on a date where they learn a lot more about each other. Charles and Onome spend the day together in his apartment also learning new things about each other and we catch up with Promise.
8	"Pay Day"	Ikechuckwu Jerry Ossai	Daniel Aideyan; Ikechuckwu Jerry Ossai	16 March 2017
Jade pays Tunde a surprise visit which doesn't go well. Charles goes on a date with Bukola but he can't seem to get his mind off Onome.
9	"Pity Party"	Ikechuckwu Jerry Ossai	Daniel Aideyan; Ikechuckwu Jerry Ossai	23 March 2017
Charles talks Kemi through issues she's having with her husband, Jade and Tolu resolve their issues and Tunde makes an interesting purchase.
10	"Mind Your Language"	Ikechuckwu Jerry Ossai	Daniel Aideyan; Ikechuckwu Jerry Ossai	30 March 2017
Charles gets stood up on his date, coincidentally, Jade is also in the same predicament after Tunde gets himself stuck in traffic and we get to meet Chioma before Onome drops a bomb on Charles.
11	"The Last Stand"	Ikechuckwu Jerry Ossai	Daniel Aideyan; Ikechuckwu Jerry Ossai	6 April 2017
Charles, Jade, Kemi all meet up at Gloria's house to celebrate her birthday and revelations are made.

=== Season 2 (2021) ===
No.	Title	Directed by	Written by	Original release date
1	"Betrayal and True Friendship"	Belinda Agedah Yanga	Olawale Adetula; Lani Aisida; Abosi Ogba	14 October 2021
Kemi, Jade and Charles reunite for Tunde’s memorial. The friends speak about their personal woes, and it is revealed that Charles has a child with Onome.
2	"The Consequences of Our Action"	Belinda Agedah Yanga	Olawale Adetula; Lani Aisida; Abosi Ogba	22 October 2021
Onome brings Kolade to Captains house and threatens to reveal their secret if he doesn’t continue paying child support. Ekeng, Charles’ cousin, pays a surprise visit to Jade.
3	"Just Friends"	Belinda Agedah Yanga	Olawale Adetula; Lani Aisida; Abosi Ogba	29 October 2021
Ekeng reveals his true intentions to Kemi. Kemi confronts Charles. Jade receives a surprise package. Kemi confronts Jade about her situation with Charles.
4	"Mistakes were made"	Belinda Agedah Yanga	Olawale Adetula; Lani Aisida; Abosi Ogba	5 November 2021
Muna opens to Jade about her relationship with Charles. Kemi plans a surprise for Captain. Jade does not take the news about Charles and Muna well. Ekeng visit Charles.
5	"Love and Other Forms of Torture"	Belinda Agedah Yanga	Olawale Adetula; Lani Aisida; Abosi Ogba	12 November 2021
Onome continues to hassle Captain for child support. Kemi and Captain get a surprise visit from Kemi’s mother. Captain sends Onome the outstanding balance for the child support.
6	"The Road to Hell and Good Intentions"	Belinda Agedah Yanga	Olawale Adetula; Lani Aisida; Abosi Ogba	19 November 2021
Kemi’s mother continues to cause strife within the household. Ekeng pays Kemi a surprise visit. Muna goes ahead with the dinner. Kemi invites Onome to the dinner.
7	"Love is Pain"	Belinda Agedah Yanga	Olawale Adetula; Lani Aisida; Abosi Ogba	26 November 2021
Charles struggles with flashbacks from his moment with Jade. Charles confronts Kemi about Onome. Onome informs Muna about Charles. The dinner ends with Muna proposing to Charles.
8	"And We All Fall Down"	Belinda Agedah Yanga	Olawale Adetula; Lani Aisida; Abosi Ogba	3 December 2021
Kemi and Ekeng share a late-night conversation. Muna neglects her job and Kemi fires Onome at Captain’s request. Jade continues grieving her loss and fires Muna.
9	"Pride and a Fall"	Belinda Agedah Yanga	Olawale Adetula; Lani Aisida; Abosi Ogba	10 December 2021
Muna the troublemaker is still ever-present and preventing true love from taking place. She has developed some new ideas on the building conflict between her and Jade.
10	"Begin At The Beginning, End at the End"	Belinda Agedah Yanga	Olawale Adetula; Lani Aisida; Abosi Ogba	17 December 2021
Onome apologizes to Kemi. Jade gets a visit from a surprise investor. Kemi owns up to her mistakes. Jade finally addresses her feelings for Charles to him and Captain forgives her
11	"Episode 11"	Belinda Agedah Yanga	Olawale Adetula; Lani Aisida; Abosi Ogba	24 December 2021
12	"Episode 12"	Belinda Agedah Yanga	Olawale Adetula; Lani Aisida; Abosi Ogba	31 December 2021

== Production ==
=== Casting ===
On 7 November 2016, the cast was reported when the trailer was released, with a line-up of Gbemi Olateru Olagbegi, Oreka Godis, Adebola "IllRymz" Olowu, Chris Attoh, Timi Charles-Fadipe, Marycolette Unamka, Yewande Lawal, Sarah Boulos, and Theo Lawson. On 9 September 2021, TNC Africa (fka. The Naked Convos) replaced its main-cast with the following: Maurice Sam as Charles (formerly played by Adebola Olowu), Martha Ehinome as Jade (formerly played by Oreka Godis), and it recruited Gbemi Olateru Olagbegi, who played Kemi in the first season for the second season as her main-character - Kemi, with a lot of other changes, including the production team changed by TNC.

== Premiere and release ==
OBFW Second Season cover

On 27 January 2017, OBFW began streaming on REDTV. On 29 January 2017, RedTV and The Naked Convos held an exclusive screening of Our Best Friend's Wedding, with the crew, including the Nigerian Minister of information Lai Mohammed, chairman at United Bank for Africa, Tony Elumelu, Group Managing Director UBA, Kennedy Uzoka, Group MD/CEO at Filmhouse Cinemas, Kene Mkparu, media personalities Toke Makinwa, Adebola Williams, Tosyn Bucknor amongst other notable influencers were present at the event.

On 26 June 2023, the second season of Our Best Friend's Wedding was released in over 35 African countries through Showmax, as the first season of the web series, re-released as a television series in 2023, through Africa Magic as the distributor. On 2 July 2023, Our Best Friend's Wedding second season began airing on Africa Magic Showcase, with its first season released internationally through Prime Video.

== Reception ==
=== Critical reception ===
Reviewing for Pulse Nigeria, the movie critics Chibumga Izuzu said: “Beyond lackluster performances, "Our Best Friend's Wedding" is watchable, and the most beautiful part of "Our Best Friend's Wedding" is the soundtrack. It is uniquely beautiful and put together that it hits hard enough to leave a mark. It lightens up the show, skewing across familiar tones. At the end of every episode, you would have new songs for a new playlist. The romance and acting in the series aren't convincing, but while "Our Best Friend's Wedding" doesn't break the mold, it's a fun watch, perfect for a Thursday evening”.

Reviewing for The Native, the magazine credited Oreka Godis as the best actress on the first season of the TV show, and wrote in its review of season one, which is made up of eleven episodes: “I’ve been saying it since episode 2 (episode one of OBFW was perfect) that the show was going to end up a clusterfuck. With every successive episode, instead of resolving subplots and glaring omissions, the showrunners and writers chose instead to focus on IllRhymz who basically spent the entire season acting like he’s a jock in a high school movie instead of a smart adult. So I came into this finale with zero expectations, after all, if you have none, you cannot experience disappointment, or so they say. Well, it turns out, you fucking can.” Ending the review pointing our its 3 major facts, which include: SPOILER ALERT, SHIT THAT MADE NO SENSE, and Ignored Sub Plots.

=== Awards and nominations ===
Year	Award	Category	Recipient	Result	Ref
2017	Nigeria Entertainment Awards	Best Lead Role In TV	Oreka Godis for "OBFW"	Won	
2017	Nigeria Entertainment Awards	Best TV Show of the Year	Our Best Friend's Wedding	Nominated	
2018	Zanzibar International Film Festival	Best Web Series	Ikechuckwu Jerry Ossai for "OBFW"	Nominated	
