= Kada River =

Film directed by Toka McBaror

- Film poster
- Directed by: Toka McBaror
- Screenplay by: Tunray Femi; Smart Conrade; Robert Ruben
- Produced by: Forinclay Ejeh; Toka McBaror
- Starring: Joke Silva; Keppy Ekpenyong; Rachel Oniga; Bayray McNwizu; TBoss; Chris Okagbue; James Blessing; Fella Makafui; Rakiya Attah; Oluchi Madubuko
- Edited by: Toka McBaror; Mr. Size
- Release date: September 2017
- Running time: 105 minutes
- Country: Nigeria
- Languages: English; Hausa

Kada River is a 2017 Nigerian romantic drama film directed by Toka McBaror who also co-produced it alongside Forinclay Ejeh with executive produced by Olakunle Churchill. The film features Nollywood actors and actress such as Joke Silva, Keppy Ekpenyong, Rachel Oniga and Bayray McNwizu.

Others notable cast members include ex-housemate in Big Brother Naija 2017 - TBoss (Tokunbo Badmus), Ghanaian actress - Fella Makafui, Chris Okagbue, James Blessing, Rakiya Attah and Oluchi Madubuko. The film is an epic portraying the crises afflicting Kaduna State, with the title being another name for the Kaduna River.

== Plot ==
The film portrays the ancient rivalry between the Boduas and the Shawlains, which has graduated into a tense and bloody unrest. Amidst this turmoil two young lovers, Jerome (Chris Okagbue) and Nadia (Fella Makafui), struggle to overcome the intense hate nurtured between their ethnic groups.

== Cast ==
- Chris Okagbue as Jerome
- Fella Makafui as Nadia
- Joke Silva as Grandma Nadia
- Keppy Ekpenyong
- Rachel Oniga as Mrs. Ekon
- Bayray McNwizu
- TBoss
- James Blessing
- Rakiya Attah
- Oluchi Madubuko

== Production ==
The film was shot in Kafanchan and Kagoro, the locations where the real life events occurred on February 21, 2000 as narrated from the director's perspective. Its production was sponsored by the Big Church Foundation.

== Release ==
The film premiered alongside nine other films at the Nollywood Travel Film Festival, held at the University of Toronto auditorium, Toronto, Canada. It was the opening film at the inaugural edition of the event which took place at Imagine Cinemas and the National Event Center in Toronto between from September 12 to September 16, 2017.
