= Lotanna =

- Lotanna Movie Poster
- Directed by: Toka McBaror
- Screenplay by: Kemi Adesoye
- Produced by: Ifan Ifeanyi Michael
- Starring: Liz Benson; Chris Okagbue; Victor Olaotan; Ama Abebrese; Jide Kosoko
- Release dates: 8 April 2017 (Eko Hotel and Suites, Lagos)
- Running time: 90 minutes
- Country: Nigeria

Lotanna is a 2017 Nigerian crime drama film, directed by Toka McBaror. The film stars Chris Okagbue as the title character. The film had its worldwide release on 8 April 2017 at Eko Hotel and Suites, Lagos, Nigeria. The original soundtrack for the film was done by Naeto C and Praiz, and was well received by film critics as a high-point in the film.

== Cast ==
- Liz Benson as Efya
- Jide Kosoko as Benson
- Ama Abebrese as Zara
- Victor Olaotan as Manny
- Victor Decker as Don Clef
- Bimbo Manuel as Faraday Ojukwu
- Chris Okagbue as Lotanna
- Chris Attoh as Kojo
- Meg Otanwa as Mama Clara

== Reception ==
Isaballa Akinseye for Vanguard, praised the soundtrack, photography and costume but felt the story, directing, acting, editing and special effects were below par. It got a 58% rating from Nollywood Reinvented, who gave a general consensus that "On a very plain level, Lotanna is a good movie but for what it could have been, it never truly achieves this". It was recommended as one of ten films to watch by The Cable. Wilfred Okiche for 360nobs was impressed with the recreation of the 1970s in the film, but was unimpressed by the body language of "Lotanna" and "Zara", as well as the acting of the "big names", it concluded its review by describing the film experience as "completely forgettable".

== See also ==
- List of Nigerian films of 2017
