= Unbreakable (2019 Nigerian film) =

2019 Nigerian film by Ben Chiadika

- Directed by: Ben Chiadika
- Screenplay by: Sola Osofisan
- Produced by: Buky Campbell
- Release date: 2019
- Country: Nigeria
- Language: English

Unbreakable is a 2019 Nigerian romantic film written by Sola Osofisan, directed by Ben Chiadika, and produced by Buky Campbell. The movie won the BON award for Movie of the Year in 2019.

The movie includes themes of mental illness.

== Plot ==
Chidi and Ikepo are a newly married couple that appear set for the good long life. On the first day at work after his honeymoon, Chidi is shown a video of his new wife, Ikepo, walking the streets seemingly out of her mind.

== Cast ==
- O.C. Ukeje as Chidi
- Arese Emokpae as Ikepo
- Yinka Davies as Receptionist
- John Dumelo as Mike
- Wendy Lawal as Kunle
- Uche Mac-Auley as Dr Tebowei
- Bimbo Manuel as Damola
- Richard Mofe-Damijo as General
