= Ikogosi =

2015 Nigerian romantic drama film

Ikogosi: The last Turn on Left
- Film poster
- Directed by: Toka McBaror
- Screenplay by: Oluwafela Johnson
- Produced by: Toka McBaror
- Starring: Chelsea Eze; IK Ogbonna; Lisa Omoriodon; Leo Orji; Didi Ekanem
- Cinematography: Olusegun Idowu
- Production companies: Plus 66 Studios; Ikogosi Warm Spring Resort
- Release date: May 15, 2015
- Running time: 75 minutes
- Country: Nigeria
- Language: English

Ikogosi: The Last Turn on Left is a 2015 Nigerian romantic drama film, produced and directed by Toka McBaror. It stars Chelsea Eze, IK Ogbonna, Lisa Omoriodon, Leo Orji, Didi Ekanem. The film narrates "the story of a simple holiday which goes bad and turns into an ugly trip".

The film was generally panned by film critics.

== Cast ==
- Chelsea Eze as Emem
- IK Ogbonna as George
- Lisa Omoriodon as Emilia
- Leo Orji as Mike
- Didi Ekanem as Beverly
- Bruttus Richard as James
- Toka McBaror as Collins
- Kunle Adetoba as Martins
- Emem Isaac as Cynthia
- Kemi Michaels as Remilekun

== Reception ==
Ikogosi was panned by critics. Ada of Nollywood Reinvented gives the film 2 out of 5 stars, praising the set design, music and costumes, but criticizes the story and screenplay, the actors' performances, and directing. She concludes: "Though there are enough stories about relationships and marriage that definitely need to be told, they have been done so many times. There's a need to make movies around such topics that add more dimension and tell the stories in different and unexpected ways. There were enough dimensions to the plot of Ikogosi to develop and the resolutions definitely deserved more set up. I would not advise committing time to watching this movie unless you are bored. Completely bored". Adenike Adebayo heavily criticized the purpose of the film and rated it 1 out of 5 stars.
