= Anita Osikweme Osikhena =

Nigerian actress, singer and model

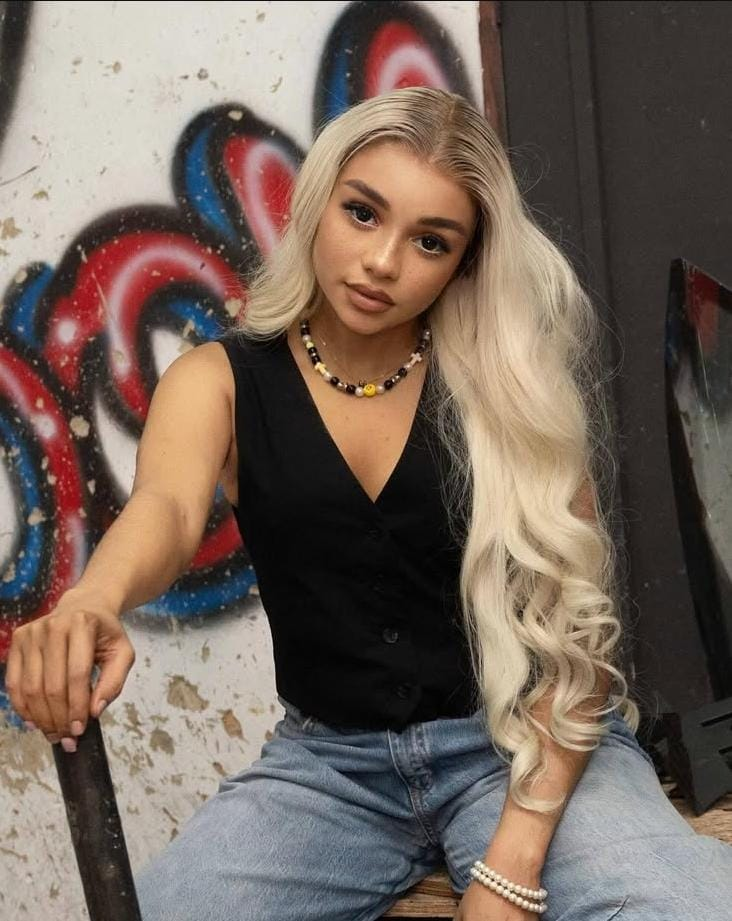
- Born: Anita Osikweme Osikhena Patrick; 13 September
- Other names: Kweme; Aniitablonde
- Occupations: Actress; Singer; Model
- Years active: 2019–present

Anita Osikweme Osikhena (born 13 September), professionally known as Kweme and formerly known as Aniitablonde, is a Nigerian actress, singer and model.

She gained wider recognition after appearing in the Nigerian action film The Island (2018). In 2019, she hosted the Toronto International Nollywood Film Festival (TINFF).

== Career ==
Osikhena began her career as a fashion model before expanding into acting and music. She appeared in the 2018 Nollywood film The Island, which brought her wider public recognition.

In 2019, she was selected as the official host of the Toronto International Nollywood Film Festival (TINFF).

In 2025, she rebranded her music career, adopting the stage name Kweme. According to The Nation, the name change reflected a new phase in her artistic career while maintaining her focus on music and entertainment.

== Music career ==
Osikhena is from Etsako West in Edo State. She released her single, "Toxic", together with its music video, in 2022. The song was deemed controversial by Vanguard because of its "confrontational" message. After this, she released another song titled "Like this", a single from her extended play (EP), TIS25. She went commercial with her music in Ghana, where she released her EP titled TIS25 (stylized as This Is Still 25) in 2022. Her debut EP was a mixture of pop, hip-hop, reggae, and trap genres with Afrobeats as its main basis called Afrofusion, and it encompassed her genuine life experiences. She contested in the 43rd edition of Miss Nigeria beauty pageant 2019 which held at the Eko Convention Center, Lagos, Nigeria. She represented Edo State and at the heart of her pet project for the pageant was tagged "Guard Her", which its focus was on girl child education and women's development. She ended up as the first runner-up, with Etsanyi Tukura emerging as the winner. She was also one of two top models for Uju Estelo's release of her collection "Memoirs Of The Fearless". As an actress, she acted in the Nollywood movie, The Island. She was the model host for the Toronto International Film Festival (TIFF) in 2019. She pioneer a genre called Afroreggaeton, a blend of afrobeats, Afro pop, reggae, soul, dancehall, rap and spoken words. The genre embodies her desire for a more energetic, expressive form of music.

== Discography ==
=== TIS25 (EP) ===
Track	Duration
"Angels"	2:55
"Like This"	2:17
"Away"	2:36
"Toxic"	3:00
"Sipping"	2:50
"Put it Down"	2:43

== Filmography ==
Year	Title	Role	Notes
2018	The Island		Film
