= Eugene Osafo-Nkansah =

Ghanaian journalist (born 1983)

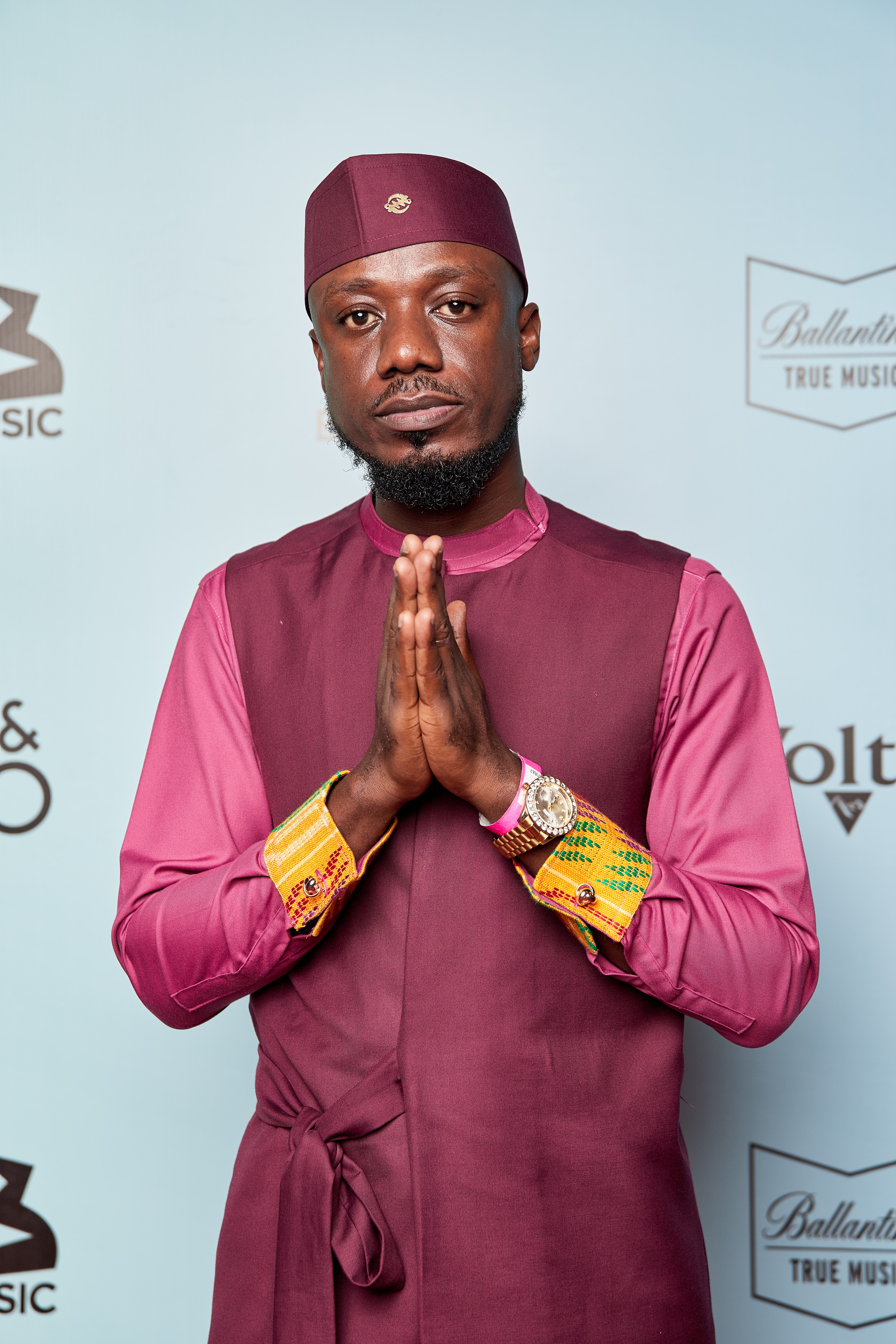
- Born: March 28, 1983 (age 43); Accra, Ghana
- Occupations: Journalist, Radio Producer, Blogger and Artistes Manager
- Years active: 2004–present
- Website: https://nkonkonsa.com/

Eugene Osafo-Nkansah (born March 28, 1983) also known as Nkonkonsa is a Ghanaian entertainment journalist, radio producer and celebrity blogger. He is also the Entertainment Editor at Peace FM Online.

== Early life and education ==
Eugene was born on March 28, 1983, to his mother Madam Kate Donkor and father, Mr. Emmanuel Osafo Nkansah. His mother hails from Obo, Kwahu in the Eastern region and father comes from Akyem Bogoro also in the Eastern region.

He started his Junior High School Education at the Bethel Academy at Lartebiokorshie in Accra and later continued to the Mpraeso Senior High School at Mpraeso in the Eastern Region (Ghana) for his senior high School education.

== Career ==
Eugene worked as a producer for Entertainment Review which aired on Peace FM (Ghana) every Thursday and Saturday presented by Kwasi Aboagye for 15 years. He is currently a producer for United Showbiz an entertainment review show on United Television Ghana and he is in charge of entertainment at Peace FM (Ghana) of the Despite Media Group.

He is also the founder and blogger for www.nkonkonsa.com a blog that is focused on entertainment in general in Ghana.

== Awards and nominations ==
- Best Showbiz Blogger/Online Writer of the Year Award (Ghana) at City People Entertainment Awards 2016.
- Best Events Blogger of the year at the Ghana Events Awards 2018.
- Best Entertainment Blog in Ghana at Ghana Showbiz Awards USA 2019 in New York.
- Nominated for Blogger of The Year for the 2020 edition of the Radio and Television Personalities award(RTP).

== Personal life ==
He is married to Actress and presenter Victoria Lebene and have a child together called Kelby. He has been involved in a lot of controversies both online and offline and wrote an apology letter to his wife publicly.
