= Three Wise Men (2016 film) =

- Theatrical poster
- Directed by: Pat Ogbere Imobhio
- Screenplay by: Stanley Edirin Isokah
- Produced by: Opa Williams
- Starring: Richard Mofe Damijo; Victor Olaotan; Zack Orji
- Release date: December 4, 2016; (Lagos)
- Country: Nigeria

Three Wise Men is a 2016 Nigerian comedy drama film, produced and directed by Opa Williams and Pat Ogbere Imobhio respectively. The film premiered to a select audience on December 4, 2016, with several notable film practitioners in attendance. The film tells a story of the social adventures of three elderly men, who seek to have fun after getting their pension from the government.

== Synopsis ==
Irikele (Richard Mofe Damijo) is an extroverted pensioner, who is very experienced in dealing with women and the younger generations. He tries to influence his friends to indulge in his sexual and emotional experiences. He has been divorced several times and was threatened with death by two of his irresponsible sons, who felt he was being selfish with his wealth.

Timi (Zack Orji) is a friend of Irikele, who is married to an extremely religious woman, he shares similar ideologies with Irikele but often needs someone to push and encourage him before making real moves, however as the film progresses, he became more comfortable with that lifestyle.

Tobere (Victor Olaotan) is the most principled among the three friends. He loves his wife and wouldn't do anything to hurt her. However, with peer pressure from his two friends who don't seem to share his moral beliefs, it becomes increasingly difficult for him to uphold them.

== Cast ==
- Richard Mofe Damijo as Irikele
- Zack Orji as Timi
- Victor Olaotan as Tobere
- Tina Mba as Regina
- Ebele Okaro as Yetunde
- Rotimi Salami as Oke
- Stanley Isokoh as Chenedoro
- Ginnefine Kanu as Angel
- Uche Nwaefuna as Essei
- Zack Salem as Doctor
- Emeka Peters as Conman
- Tricia Obi as Receptionist
- Thelma Nwosu as Pension Officer
- Frank O. Ekwem as Gateman
- Evi Eyo as Boutique Girl
- Okwundu Ekene as Car Salesman
- Imabong Effiong as Lady in Elevator

== Reception ==
Wilfred Okiche for 360nobs praised the acting of the main cast, with particular acclaim for Richard Mofe Damijo, describing the film as genuinely funny, but downplayed the roles the leading women were made to play in the film as cliche. It noted that "Tobere" has gotten so engrossed in his role in Tinsel (TV series), that it was difficult for him to play a character opposite of what "Ade Williams" represented in the series. It concluded its review by stating that the last 10 minutes of the film were completely unnecessary and a total detachment from the remaining parts of the film. Joy Dibia for Xplorenollywood also criticized the unneeded evangelical nature of the latter parts of the film, although she rated it an 8 out of 10 for its genuinely comedic theme and powerful acting. True Nollywood Stories titled its review "Opa Williams returns to filmmaking with an eyesore".
