= Eso Dike =

Nigerian actor

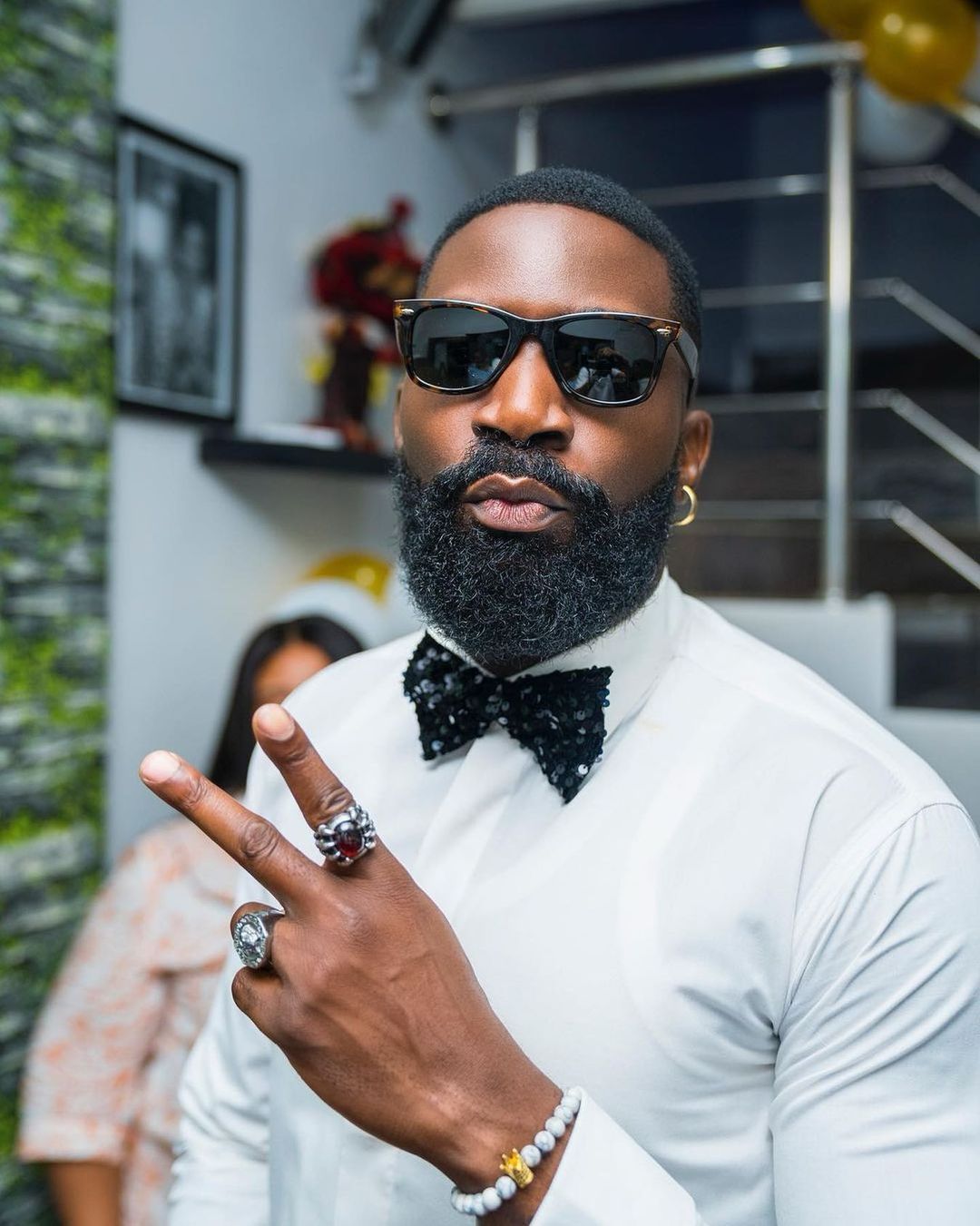
- Eso at a movie premiere.
- Born: Okolocha Esowese Dike; Benin City, Nigeria
- Education: University of Benin (LL.B); Nigerian Law School (B.L.); Ebony Life Creative Academy; Del-York Creative Academy
- Occupations: Actor; musician; television personality; lawyer
- Years active: 2014–present

Okolocha Esowese Dike professionally known as Eso Dike is a Nigerian actor, musician, television personality, lawyer and media entrepreneur. He is known for his role as Tsola in The Smart Money Woman (2020), Leye in Ndani TV's Game On, (2020), Malik in Africa Magic's Ricordi (2021). He was one of the highest grossing Nollywood actors in 2022 after starring in Ijakumo, The Wildflower and The Stand Up; all of which combined, made upwards of ₦300 million Naira at the Nigerian box office.

== Early life ==
He attended the University of Benin, where he studied Law and graduated obtaining an LL.B before proceeding to the Nigerian Law School, Abuja, where he graduated and obtained a B.L, and was called to the Nigerian Bar.

== Career ==
Dike got a job as an intern at Spice TV after graduating from law school. After several auditions, in 2016 Dike joined Nigerian television series, Tinsel.

== Personal life ==
Dike lives in Lagos. He has a pet dog named Kobe who appears regularly on his social media. He enjoys sports and plays football regularly.

== Filmography ==
Year	Film	Role	Notes
2016	Tinsel		
2018	Forbidden	Charles	
2018	Jenifa's Diary	Jeff	
2019	Made In Heaven	Jay	
2020	The Smart Money Woman	'Tsola	
2020	Finding Hubby	Mr.X	Directed by Olufemi Ogunsanwo
2021	Our Best Friend's Wedding	Ekeng	Web Drama-Series
2021	Ricordi	Malik	TV Series
2021	Ponzi	Sam	Directed by Kayode Kasum
2021	Desperate Houseboys	Antar Elliot	Directed by Sunkanmi Adebayo
2021	Situationship	Victor	Directed by Akin-Tijani Balogun
2021	Ije	John	Directed by Nwani Orire
2021	Perfect Neighbour	Eric	Directed by Tissy Nnachi
2021	Charge And Bail	Victory	Directed by Uyoyou Adia
2021	Duke and Dami	Tesola	Directed by Ozioma B. Nwughala
2021	Soole	Innocent	
2021	Dubara		
2021	Miss-Understood	Mofe	
2021	Parallel Lines	Ikechukwu	
2021	Unintentional	Chris	
2022	Chief Daddy 2: Going For Broke	Killer Bee	
2022	Vindictive		
2022	Closure		
2022	Detty Thirty	Morgan	
2022	Blood Sisters	Ibrahim	
2022	The Wildflower	Kayode	
2022	Greener Lwan	Ezekiel	
2022	Glamour Girls	Hel's Brother	
2022	The Bait		
2022	Finding Hubby2	Mr.X	
2022	The Knot	Richard	
2022	The Stand Up		Direct by Jide Oyegbile
2022	kith & Kin	Eche	
2022	Flawsome	Godspower	TV Series
2022	Crazy Therapy		Direct by Jide Oyegbile
2022	Weather For Two	Kolade Thompson	Directed by Wale Adesanya
2022	Ijakumo: The Born Again Stripper	Wale	
2023	GRIND	Kobe	TV Series
2023	To Freedom	Kevwe	Directed by Biodun Stephen
2023	Love In A Pandemic	Tejiri (TJ)	Directed by Akay Ilozobhie
2023	Be My Valentine	Eyo	Directed by Nwani Orire
2023	A Dead Man's Souvenir		Directed by Tissy Nnachi
2023	Chaos Calling	Detective Remi	Directed by Biodun Stephen
2023	The Play Book		Directed by Muyiwa Aluko
2023	Now That We Are Married		Directed by Lota Chukwu
2023	Direct Message	Ade	Directed by Jay Franklyn Jituboh
2023	No Way Through	Bolasco	Action
2024	Unknown Soja	Abuga	Thriller
2024	Cold as Ice	Ayodeji	Directed by Great Valentine Edochie
