= The Island (2018 Nigerian film) =

2018 Nigerian film directed by Toka McBaror

- Directed by: Toka McBaror
- Written by: Smart Conrad
- Produced by: Daniel Cole Chiori; Freda Francis
- Starring: Femi Adebayo; Segun Arinze; Sukanmi Bahlofin; Sambasa Nzeribe; Tokunbor Idowu; Anita Osikweme Osikhena
- Cinematography: Toka McBaror
- Music by: Toka McBaror; Onyinye Onuoha
- Release date: 10 August 2018
- Running time: 94 minutes
- Country: Nigeria
- Language: English

The Island is a 2018 Nigerian action film directed by Toka McBaror and co-produced by Daniel Cole Chiori and Freda Francis. It stars Femi Adebayo, Segun Arinze, Sukanmi Bahlofin, and Sambasa Nzeribe.

== Plot ==
Hamza, a colonel in the army, intercepts a conversation regarding a weapon sales deal between an unknown terrorist and an agent, and while trying to get the intel to his commanding officer, he makes a shocking discovery.

== Cast ==
- Femi Adebayo as Kola
- Segun Arinze as Major Gata
- Sukanmi Bahlofin as Bishop
- Tokunbor Idowu as Sandra
- Sambasa Nzeribe as Hamza
- Anita Osikweme Osikhena as Grace
- Smart Conrad as Douglas
- Deo Junior as Morgan
- Amaka Orji as Nicole
- Emeka Okoye as Uche

== Production ==
The film was produced by Achievas Entertainment Limited.

== Release ==
The film was initially produced under the title Death Island and a trailer was uploaded to YouTube in November 2017 by Fresh Nigerian Movie Trailers. The official trailer was later released in May 2018, and the film was released by Achievas Entertainment on 10 August 2018.

== Reception ==
Before the film's official release, Innocent Idibia commented on social media that it was "a new era for Nollywood".

In Toronto, Canada, the film won several awards at the TINFF 2018 Nollywood Movie Awards, including Best African Film, Best Nollywood Actress won by Tokunbo Idowu (also known as TBoss), Best Supporting Actor won by Segun Arinze, and Best Nollywood Director won by Toka McBaror. It was also nominated in categories including Best Feature Film, Best Producer, Best Editing, Best Photography and Best Cinematography.
