= Olakunle Churchill =

Nigerian businessman and philanthropist

- Born: Olakunle Oladunni Churchill; Ondo State, Nigeria
- Occupations: Businessman; computer engineer; philanthropist
- Spouses: Tonto Dikeh (m. 2015; div. 2017) Rosaline Meurer (m. 2019)
- Children: 4

Olakunle Oladunni Churchill, is a Nigerian businessman and philanthropist. He is the founder of Churchill Group and Churchill Foundation.

== Early life and education ==
Churchill was born and raised in Ondo State. He started his education at Canon Adeyemi Nursery and Primary School, Ondo State, before moving to Apata Memorial High School, Isolo for his junior secondary education. He then went to Nigerian Navy Secondary School, Abeokuta for his senior secondary education.

== Career ==
While growing up, Olakunle had the option of enrolling into Nigerian Defence Academy to become a military officer, but changed his mind to study information technology and became a computer engineer.

=== Churchill Group ===
In 2005, Olakunle started his career in Ghana at 23 years with real estate business and ICT company, founding the Big Churchill. In 2010, the Churchill Group succeeded his former company, launching in agriculture, mining, engineering and entertainment. Later in his career, he started Churchill Foundation as a charity organization with funding generated from 10 percent of all his company revenues.

== Philanthropy ==
Churchill Foundation has donated to orphanages, the poor and given scholarships to students in Nigeria. In 2017, the foundation provided funds and relief materials to the victims of Kada river massacre in Kagoro, Kaduna State. A film, Kada River was produced by the foundation and based on the true life story of the massacre. The film premiered in September 2017 at the Nollywood Travel Film Festival in Toronto, Canada. The foundation donated an ambulance, 1,000 fire extinguishers and 1,000 fire blankets to the Nigeria Federal Fire Service. The foundation gave three plots of land in Abuja, Nigeria to the three finalists from the Big Brother Naija Season 2. In March 2019, the foundation started "Say No To Poverty" project in Ondo State, to empower over 1000 youths from each 36 states of Nigeria.

== Awards and recognition ==
In 2015, Churchill received a Nigeria Goodwill Ambassador Award. In 2016, he was awarded an honorary doctorate degree in communication sociale from ISCG University, Cotonou. He appeared on the cover for the 11th edition of La Mode Magazine success builder issue and received a recognition award from the same magazine at the Green October Event 2016 in recognition of "his significant humanitarian contribution to humanity". In 2017, he received a chieftaincy title from the Kagoro community, and from the council of chiefs of Kamara community, Liberia. He received the African Youth and Governance Champion Award for his "immense contributions to entrepreneurship, agriculture and ICT" and a Humanitarian Award at the AfroGlobal Television Excellence Awards. He received the Special Recognition Award at the 2017 City People Movie Awards and Man of the Year at the 2017 Scream Awards. In 2018, he received a chieftaincy title as Ezinwa Chukwu Mere Eze by Nike Community, Enugu East, Enugu State. In 2019, he appeared on the cover for the 12th edition of Attention Magazine impact impression.

== Marriage to Tonto Dikeh ==
Churchill and Tonto Dikeh met in 2014 at Escape Nightclub in Lagos during the birthday party of Churchill's brother. Dikeh became pregnant six months after they started dating and they married on 29 August 2015 at her hometown Rumukani, Rumukwuta, Rivers State. In 2016, they had a son together and divorced the following year in July 2017.

== Personal life ==
Churchill was raised by his grandmother in Ondo State. He is the adopted son of former Nigerian president, Olusegun Obasanjo. He married Rosaline Meurer in 2021, and they have a son together.
