= Sanitation Day =

2021 Nigerian crime-thriller film by Seyi Babatope

- Directed by: Seyi Babatope
- Screenplay by: Seyi Babatope Temitope Bolade Eche Enuwa
- Story by: Seyi Babatope
- Starring: Blossom Chukwujekwu; Elozanam Ogbolu; Charles Inojie; Nse Ikpe-Etim
- Production companies: Phebean Films; Filmone Entertainment; Huahua Media; West African Film Fund; Empire Entertainment
- Distributed by: Filmone Entertainment
- Release date: 29 January 2021
- Running time: 110 minutes
- Country: Nigeria
- Language: English

Sanitation Day is a 2021 Nigerian crime thriller film produced, written and directed by Seyi Babatope. The film stars Blossom Chukwujekwu, Elozanam Ogbolu, Charles Inojie and Nse Ikpe-Etim in the lead roles. The film is based on two inspectors who have the prime responsibility to uncover the details of four perpetrators regarding a brutal murder of a man before the eve of Sanitation Day. The film had its theatrical release on 29 January 2021 and opened to generally mixed reviews from critics. The film was also selected as one of the 6 Nigerian films in the final list by the Nigerian Oscar Selection Committee for the Oscar 2021 submissions but was nominated in final Oscar submissions list.

== Synopsis ==
The corpse of a young man is found in Baba Risi's Face-me-I-face-you during the routine communal environmental sanitation on the last Saturday of the month. The 'Police Department' is invited to investigate the death of the unidentified young man.

== Cast ==
- Blossom Chukwujekwu as Inspector Hassan
- Elozanam Ogbolu as Inspector Stanley
- Charles Inojie as Mazi Okeke
- Nse Ikpe-Etim as Madam Suzie
- Baaj Adebule as Friday
- Rosemary Abazie as Nkechi
- Tunji Aderibigbe as Theophilus
- Tobi Bakre as Dead Guy
- Maryam Booth as Munirat
- Ujam Chukwunonso as Malik
- Rita Edward as Mama Nkechi
- Chris Okagbue as Jonah
- Chuka Chyke as Chukwudi
- Belinda Effah as Ekaette
- Olakunle Fawole as Ajala
- Adebayo Salami as Oga Bello
- Saeed Mohammed as Umaru
- Matilda Ogunleye as Mama Cletus
- Yewande Osamien as Iya Tawa
- Elvina Ibru as Contractor

== Production ==
The principal photography of the film began in March 2020 and it marked the second West African Film Fund project of FilmOne Entertainment. FilmOne Entertainment in collaboration with Pheabean Films, Huahua Media and Empire Entertainment agreed to produce the film. However the production of the film was suspended shortly after commencement due to the impact of the COVID-19 pandemic. The shooting of the film was halted before 23 March 2020. The film was set in the backdrop of 2016. It was released on Netflix on 21 July 2021.

== Critical reception ==
In a review for Premium Times, Yousuph Grey said "Now that he has ticked this off his bucket list, we hope that Mr. Babatunde goes back to making relatable and less complicated movies because ‘Sanitation Day’ leaves no lasting impression. It's forgettable, at best." He rated the movie 3/10.
