= In the Cupboard (film) =

2012 Nigerian film

- Directed by: Desmond Elliot
- Written by: Kehinde Olorunyomi
- Starring: Alex Ekubo
- Release dates: October 31, 2012
- Running time: +85 minutes
- Country: Nigeria
- Language: English

In the Cupboard is a Nigerian drama movie released in 2012, featuring most top acts. The movie narrates a story about a woman who reunites with her children after the death of her husband. The will of her husband is read and she believes she is going to lose the trust her kids have for her because of the secret she has.
