= Bukunyi Olateru-Olagbegi =

Nigerian entrepreneur and politician

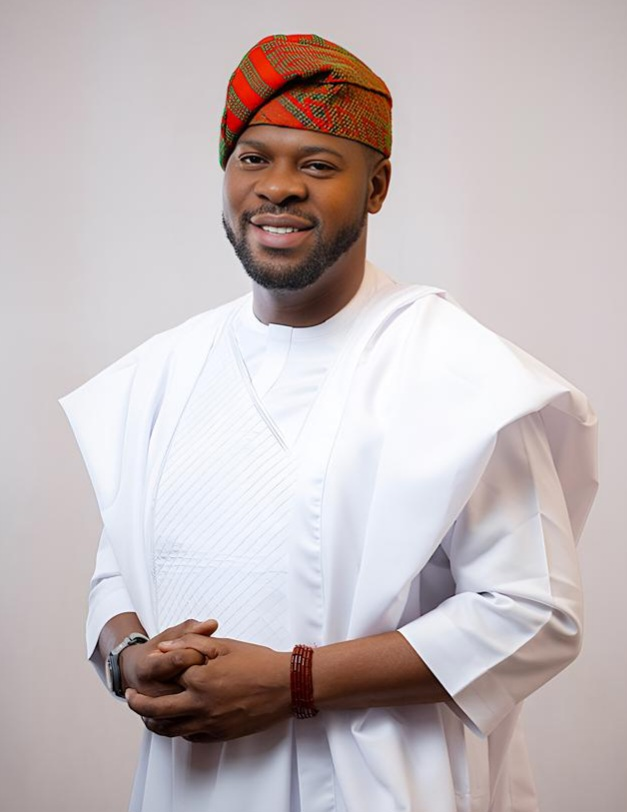
- Bukunyi Olateru-Olagbegi
- Born: 17 May 1990 (age 36)
- Citizenship: Nigeria
- Occupations: Entrepreneur, Politician
- Organization: FBSS Nigeria Limited
- Political party: All Progressives Congress (APC)
- Spouse: Mo'Cheddah
- Relatives: Gbemi Olateru Olagbegi (sister)
- Family: Olagbegi Family

Bukunyi Olateru-Olagbegi (born 17 May 1990) is a Nigerian entrepreneur and politician. He is a member of the royal Olagbegi family in Owo, a city in Ondo State, southwestern Nigeria. He is the founder and chairman of the Modern Democratic Party. In 2018, Olateru-Olagbegi's contribution to Nigerian politics was a feature of a Forbes Africa magazine article on the 2019 Nigerian elections, which credited him as one of Nigeria's young leading political figures. In 2019, he was named among the 100 Most Influential People of African Descent (MIPAD) under the United Nations.

In 2026, he declared his intention to contest for the House of Representatives seat for Owo/Ose Federal Constituency under the All Progressives Congress, ahead of the 2027 general elections.

== Career ==
Olateru-Olagbegi is the CEO of FBSS Nigeria Limited and also serves on the board of Altheus Limited, a Nigerian firm with interests in energy, human capacity development and private equity. In 2016, Olateru-Olagbegi was appointed as the chairman of the central working committee for The Future Awards. He also serves as the chairman of the central working committee for SME100 Nigeria.

In April 2026, he convened the maiden edition of the Owo Praise the Lord Concert in Owo, Ondo State. The event was conceived as a large-scale gospel music and worship gathering aimed at bringing together residents, worshippers, music ministers, youth groups, church communities and other participants from across the state in an atmosphere of praise, thanksgiving and spiritual reflection.

The inaugural concert attracted no fewer than 7,000 participants, making it one of the notable faith-based gatherings hosted in Owo within the period. Beyond its religious significance, the event also served as a platform for community engagement, social cohesion and the promotion of gospel music as a tool for inspiration, unity and positive public expression. Its successful hosting positioned the Owo Praise the Lord Concert as a potentially recurring event within the state’s Christian and cultural calendar.

== Politics ==
In 2018, sequel to the passage of the #NotTooYoungToRun Bill at the Nigerian National Assembly, Olateru-Olagbegi at age 27, successfully registered a political party, Modern Democratic Party (MDP), with the Independent National Electoral Commission. The party has been described as representing the new face of active youth involvement in politics in Nigeria.

In November 2018, the MDP unveiled singer and filmmaker Bankole Wellington (Banky W.) as its candidate to contest the 2019 Federal House of Representatives elections, representing Eti-Osa Constituency. Banky W eventually lost to the ruling APC candidate, Ibrahim Babajide Obanikoro, in a keenly contested race. The party is reported to have 65,000 members and fielded two legislative candidates in the 2019 General Elections in Nigeria.

In December 2018, Olateru-Olagbegi's contribution to Nigerian politics was a feature of a Forbes Africa magazine article on the 2019 Nigerian elections.

Olateru-Olagbegi said

We must correct the present for the sake of the future. This is our scared duty to our country

— Let’s Build an Unstoppable Force’, Newly Registered ‘Youth Party’ – MDP Tells Nigerian Youths, Signal Newspaper

In 2026, during the 2027 election cycle, Olateru-Olagbegi declared his intention to run for the House of Representatives seat for Owo/Ose Federal Constituency, in Ondo state, southwest Nigeria under the umbrella of the All Progressives Congress (APC). He was also appointed as the patron of the City Boy Movement in Ondo state, a grassroot support initiative for the incumbent president, President Bola Ahmed Tinubu.

== Personal life ==
Olateru-Olagbegi married singer Mo’Cheddah in May 2018 at a private ceremony in Lagos, Nigeria.
