= Bayray McNwizu =

Nigerian actress

Eberechukwu Nwizu
- Eberechukwu
- Born: July 1, 1984 (age 41)
- Other names: Bayray McNwizu
- Citizenship: Nigerian
- Education: B.Sc Philosophy
- Alma mater: Lagos State University
- Notable work: Kiss and Tell

Eberechukwu Nwizu (born July 1, 1984), better known as Bhaira Mcwizu or Bayray McNwizu is a Nigerian actress. She is a graduate of philosophy from the Lagos State University, Ojo. Bayray came to the limelight after winning the third Amstel Malta Box Office (AMBO) reality show. In 2009, she received an Africa Movie Academy Awards nomination.

== Filmography ==
- Cindy's Note (2008) - Cindy Haastrup
- Tales of Eve (2014) - Tosan
- Kiss and Tell (2011) - Eka
- Calabash
- Lies Men Tell (2013) - Annabel
- My Rich Boyfriend (2014)
- A Long Night (2015) - Mary
- Cruel Intentions
- The Visit (2015) - Eugenia Nebo
- Tiwa's Baggage (2017) - Tiwa
- Kada River (2017)
- The Ghost and the Tout (2018) - Adunni
- Broken walls (2018) - Bee-Bee
- Seven and a Half Dates (2018)
- Kasanova (2019)
- Crazy Grannies (2021) - Munachi
- April (2022)
- My Patient and I (2022) as Grace
- Escape (2022) as Joyce
- The Date (2023) as Ejiro
- Dear Best Friends (2023) as Temi
- Mine Was Yours (2023) as Mabel

== TV series ==
Year	Title	Role	Director	Ref
2015	Lekki Wives Season 3	—N/a	Blessing Egbe	

== See also ==
- List of Nigerian actors
