= Tomi Odunsi =

Nigerian actress (born 1987)

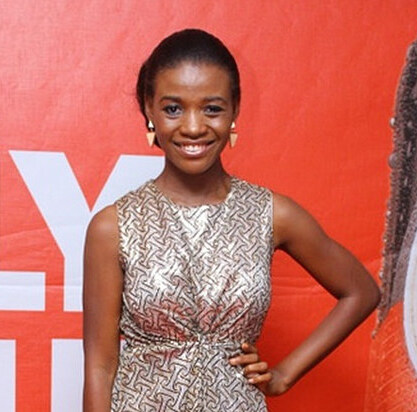
- Odunsi at the 2014 Africa Magic Viewers Choice Awards
- Born: Tomi Odunsi Fadina; 24 May 1987 (age 39); Ogun State, Nigeria
- Education: University of Lagos
- Occupations: Actress; songwriter
- Years active: 1995–present
- Known for: Tinsel

Tomi Odunsi Fadina (born 24 May 1987) is a Nigerian actress and songwriter best known for playing "Salewa" in the television series, Tinsel, a popular African soap opera.

== Early life ==
Tomi Odunsi was born on 24 May 1987, in Ogun State, Nigeria. Tomi Odunsi attended the University of Lagos, where she obtained a Bachelor of Arts (B.A) degree in Linguistics and African Languages with a specialization in the Yoruba language. Odunsi premiered her debut single, "I Wan Blow", in April 2013 and performed it at the Oriental Hotel in August 2013. She is of the opinion that policies that protect the creative industry should be implemented.

== Career ==
Her songwriting credits include:

- The Magic 2013 Christmas Theme Song
- In the Music Movie soundtrack
- All the songs in her EP, Santacruise
- Superwomen episode on Moments with Mo with Mo Abudu
- Urban Lounge TV show theme song

== Personal life ==
Odunsi married fitness trainer Seun Fadina in a registry ceremony in July 2016. The couple welcomed their first child together in February 2020.

== Theatre ==
- Oluronbi: The Musical 1 & 2: Sope (support). Aboriginal Productions.
- Oluronbi: The Musical 3: Ope (support). Aboriginal Productions
- Fractures: Toju (Lead). Aboriginal Productions
- Rubiewe: Cup (Support). Paws Productions.
- Saro: The Musical: Ronke (Support). TerraKulture BAP Productions

== Filmography ==
- Tinsel (2012) as Salewa
- In the Music (2015)
- One Minute Man (2015)
- Seven (2019) as Wando
- Lagos to Abuja Coach (2020)

== Other ventures ==
Tomi Odunsi is the CEO and founder of CGT Media Ltd, ⁣ an African entertainment and media company.

== See also ==
- List of Yoruba people
- List of Nigerian actresses
