= Mo'Cheddah =

Nigerian rapper and singer

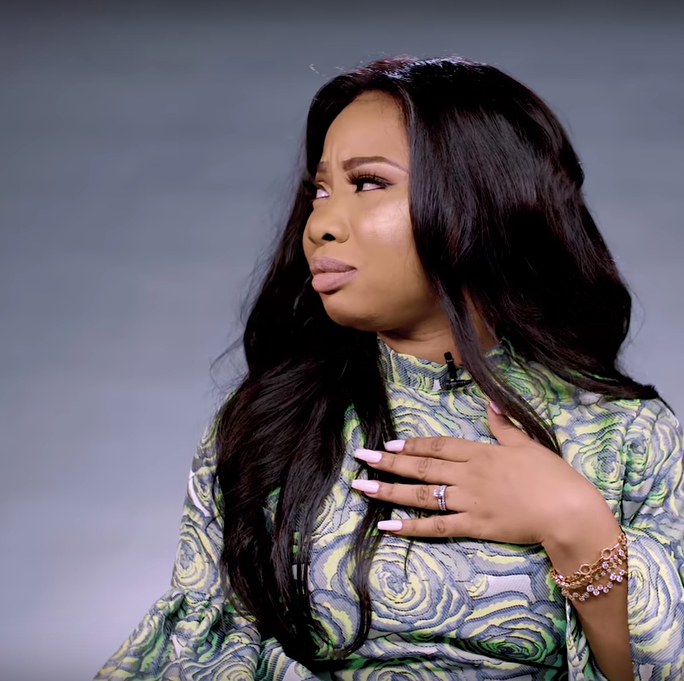
- Mo'Cheddah on TGIF on Ndani TV, 2019

Background information
- Also known as: Mocheddah
- Born: Modupe-Oreoluwa Oyeyemi Ola; 16 October 1990 (age 36); Lagos, Nigeria
- Genres: Hip hop, R&B
- Occupations: Rapper, singer, song writer, fashion designer
- Years active: (2009 – present)
- Label: Mo'Cheddah Music
- Website: mocheddahmusic.com

Modupe-Oreoluwa Oyeyemi Ola (born 16 October 1990), known by her stage name Mo'Cheddah (sometimes stylized as Mocheeda or Mocheddah), is a Nigerian rapper and singer. She released her debut studio album, Franchise Celebrity, in 2010 while signed to Knighthouse Entertainment. The album was preceded by the 2009 promotional single "If You Want Me". She parted ways with Knighthouse in February 2012 and established her own label, Cheddah Music.

== Early life and education ==
Mo'Cheddah was born on 16 October 1990, in Lagos. She is the fourth daughter of five children, though her family roots are in Osun State. She completed her primary education at the University of Lagos Staff School in Yaba, Lagos and later enrolled at Our Lady of Apostles, Yaba where she would complete her secondary education. She is a creative arts graduate from the University of Lagos.

== Career ==
Mo'Cheddah started exploring her creative side at age 12, and was initially interested in acting, but later transitioned to singing. She signed a record deal with Rogba Arimoro, under his music label, Knighthouse Music. She later left and founded her own record label Cheddah Music. She began working on her second album which was due to be released in 2016.

Mo'Cheddah also has a secondary career as a fashion designer.

== Personal life ==
In May 2018, she married her long-time boyfriend, Prince Bukunyi Olateru-Olagbegi in a private ceremony in Lagos, Nigeria. As the wife of a Yoruba royal, she is entitled to use the honorific title, Olori. The couple welcomed their first child in 2021.

== Discography ==
Studio albums

- Franchise Celebrity (2010)

Selected singles

- "Survive"
- "My Time"
- "Destinambari" (featuring Phyno)
- "Tori Olorun"
- "Bad"
- "Coming for You" (featuring May D)

== Selected awards and nominations ==
Year	Event	Prize	Recipient	Result
2010	MTV Africa Music Awards 2010	Best New Artist	Herself	Won
2010	Channel O Music Video Awards	Best Female Video	"If You Want Me" (featuring Othello)	Won
2011	The Headies	Hip Hop World Revelation of the Year	Herself	Nominated
2014	ELOY Awards	Female Music Artist "Destinambari"	—N/a	Nominated

== Selected videography ==
Year	Title	Director	Ref
2015	"Bad"	Clarence Peters	
