= Wendy Lawal =

Nigerian actress and model

Yewande Lawal Simpson
- Born: Yewande Lawal Adebisi; February 25, 1991 (age 35)
- Education: University of Lagos
- Occupations: Actress; Model
- Years active: 2009–present
- Spouse: Wanri Simpson (m. 2018)

Yewande Lawal Simpson is a Nigerian actress and model. She was formerly known as Yewande Lawal Adebisi. She won Miss Lagos Carnival Pageant in 2012.

== Biography ==
She is the fifth of six children. Lawal married Wanri Simpson in 2018. She lost her mother in 2020.

=== Education ===
Lawal's primary and secondary education was in Nigeria. She also has a bachelor's degree in Creative Arts from the University of Lagos.

=== Career ===
Lawal's acting career started professionally in 2009 after featuring in the Nigerian television series Living in Lagos. She won the Miss Lagos Carnival Pageant and in the same year, she got a role to feature as Shoshanna in the Nigerian television soap opera Tinsel in 2012. She has also starred in short films, TV and web series such as: The Men's Club, Jemeji, Journey to Self, The Room, Out of Sight, Foreign Love, among others.

== Selected filmography ==
- Tinsel (2008)
- Journey to Self (2012), as Young Nse
- Our Best Friend's Wedding (2017), as Tolu
- The Men's Club (2018), as Shade
- The Auction (2018), as Wendy
- Jimeji (20)
- The Room (20)
- Unbreakable (2019), as Kunle
- The Set Up (2019), as Young Chike
- Things We Do in the Shadow (2022), as N.K.
- Grey Roses (2022), as Colleen
- Refuge (2023), as Amara Utibe
- Alli Eid Dinner (2024), as Morenike Alli
