= The Visit (2015 Nigerian film) =

2015 Nigerian romantic comedy thriller film

- Theatrical release poster
- Directed by: Olufunke Fayoyin
- Written by: Kehinde Joseph; Biodun Stephen
- Produced by: Biodun Stephen
- Starring: Nse Ikpe Etim; Femi Jacobs; Blossom Chukwujekwu; Bayray McNwizu
- Cinematography: Lukman Abdulrahman
- Edited by: Abimbola Taiwo; Iseoluwa Emmanuel
- Production company: Koga Studios
- Distributed by: FilmOne Distributions
- Release date: 16 October 2015
- Country: Nigeria
- Language: English
- Box office: ₦14,000,000

The Visit is a 2015 Nigerian romantic comedy thriller film directed by Olufunke Fayoyin and produced by Biodun Stephens. The film, which is a four-cast movie, stars an ensemble of Nse Ikpe Etim, Femi Jacobs, Blossom Chukwujekwu and Bayray McNwizu.

Shot in 2014, the film focuses on the life of two couples with different lifestyles living in the same apartment block and how they handle conflict when their lifestyles collide.

== Plot ==
Chidi Nebo (Femi Jacobs) and Eugenia Nebo (Bayray Mcnwizu) are a 'prim and proper' couple, who live their entire life on a schedule, which is always carefully and perfectly planned out by the extremely uptight wife, Eugenia. They are however joined as neighbours by another couple who lives exact opposite of the Nebos. Ajiri Shagaya (Nse Ikpe-Etim) and Lanre Shagaya (Blossom Chukwujekwu) are a spontaneous, carefree and totally disorganized couple. Apart from their apartment which looks like a garbage dump, they litter the premises, make so much noise to disturb their neighbours, drink a lot, and smoke narcotics; all of which Eugenia can't bear and she keeps urging her husband to do something about them.

One day, after returning drunk from a party, the Shagayas make out just outside the Nebos' window; Eugenia persuade Chidi into promising to talk to the other couple the next morning. Later that night, the Shagayas also get into a fight and they break the Nebos' window in the process; this leads them into concluding to go apologize the next morning. The Shagayas meet the Nebos right at the Nebos' door, as they are also on their way to go see the Shagayas. The Shagayas are invited in by Chidi and they discuss things amicably, whilst Eugenia is visibly enraged, but lets her husband to do the talking.

The Shagayas leave their neighbours' home, but realize they've forgotten their keys. Lanre, trying to play the husband, orders Ajiri to go get the keys but she refuses. They later agree for Ajiri to knock on the door whilst Lanre will do the talking. They however enter the Nebos' apartment and disorganizes the room trying to search for their keys; Chidi, fascinated by the couple, points out to them the keys, which have been placed on the table. As they were about to leave, Eugenia walks in to see the mess and she angrily speaks to the Shagayas, denigrating their entire existence; she rudely condemns the noise they make, the littering of premises, the smoking, and the loud/public sex. The Shagayas take their seats, realizing there's really a lot to talk about. Ajiri contemptuously asks Eugenia to please teach them how to live like civilized couples; Eugenia brings out typed papers for everyone, and starts to lecture. After she is done, Ajiri insults Eugenia, implying that she is not getting a great sexual encounter; because if she did, silence won't be an option during sex. Meanwhile, Eugenia realizes Chidi has been throwing her meals in the trash can after the Shagayas were unable to eat the sandwiches she offered them.

As the Shagayas were about to leave; Ajiri teases the Nebos, telling Lanre that she'd go prepare a special delicacy for him and they'd have a great, loud sex. Eugenia gets back at them, likening the couple to animals in the zoo. Ajiri turns back and heckles the Nebos about how to have a civilized sex, teasing them about what a great sex is; Chidi, now sweaty and unsettled, orders the Shagayas out of his house, boasting that he is great in bed, but mistakenly says that his wife doesn't enjoy sex; Eugenia confesses that she has tried, but she just can't enjoy intercourse, because she was abused: vaginal mutilation. The situation gets sober. Ajiri follows Eugenia to the bathroom to discuss, while the husbands hangout in the kitchen. After the new pair of friends are done discussing, they head to the living room, where Ajiri bids the other couple goodbye, as she needs to attend to some clients on her PC. Eugenia offers her laptop, where Ajiri discovers Eugenia is the owner of a popular blog, which happens to be her favourite; She also reveals herself as the regular commenter, who posts musical beats (composed by Lanre). Eugenia spills and asks about her husband's "career problems". Lanre gets to learn that Ajiri was not in total support of his music career, but eventually realizes she's been hooking her up regardless.

Ajiri, enraged, realizing Eugenia deliberately spilled the secret to get back at her, also reveals that Eugenia is dealing with alcohol addiction. Eugenia confesses to Chidi, whom all the while has been made to believe that his wife doesn't take alcohol, that she drinks vodka every morning by mixing it with a bit of coffee, right in front of Chidi. Eugenia also reveals that Ajiri cheats on Lanre whenever he is out of the house, as she makes her traditional loud moans in Lanre's absence. However, Ajiri confesses it to be a dildo, telling her husband, who now thinks he's not good enough, that she has a high libido, and she wants to avoid cheating on him. Ajiri also says that Lanre performed really badly on their first night together, but he is much better now. Lanre then confesses that Ajiri was the first girl he had sex with. They both kiss and make up.

Chidi proposes they all start all over as nice neighbours, they head to the dining table, where the Nebos order a full serving from a restaurant. While they wait, they introduce themselves. Eugenia introduces herself as a stay-at-home blogger, a child who was abandoned, but picked up and raised by her aunty. Chidi introduces himself as a computer geek who owns his own IT firm. Ayiri is an events planner, while Lanre introduces himself as a "failed" music producer. The Nebos ask him to play one of his beats, and they enjoy it, with Chidi bragging about dancing better than Lanre; Lanre refers Chidi to ask from his past secondary school mates on his dancing skills. Coincidentally, he attended the same school with Eugenia and they in fact belong to the same set; however, Eugenia can't remember strategic events that happened in the school, and thinks the principal as the biology teacher. Ajiri starts teasing her once more, to say the truth. Enraged Eugenia grabs a bottle of Vodka attempting to hurt Ajiri, speaking in a pure south southern Pidgin. Chidi quickly disarms his wife, asking where the "tongues" came from, and how she could pick up a weapon so swiftly like a professional fighter (and Ajiri chips in; "or from the streets").

Eugenia now confesses everything; revealing that she rewrote her entire life. She was born in Sapele, Delta, but her Aunty brought her to Lagos. She was made fun of by her classmates from the university, who looked down on her as a village girl. She then decided to change, and be a person whom the world would adore and not ridicule. She also revealed that she pushed hard drugs into Italy and that her parents are still in Sapele; she visits them once a year. Chidi is now so exasperated, confused of who exactly his wife is. Lanre in the process of calming him down and imploring him to forgive his wife, accuses him of murder. Lanre reveals that Chidi was in a cult whilst in school, because he earlier called a mutual friend by a cult name. Chidi also accuses Lanre of the same thing; Ajiri shoving it off that she knows already, but that he didn't kill anyone. Chidi reveals that it is impossible for anyone to be in "Blade" (the cult name), without having hit jobs. Lanre eventually confesses that he was never in Blade, but only bought their protection.

As the two couples are making up and forgiving each other for their misdeeds, a call comes in on Chidi's phone; Eugenia picks up the call despite Chidi's disapproval; she discovers that Chidi is having an extra-marital affair with his secretary, and they already have kids. Chidi says he got into it, because she has refused to bear him a child. Eugenia says that she's trying; Chidi says he thought so too, until he discovered that she was using contraceptives; he says he went to Ada, the secretary for comfort and a "good meal". As the Nebos were discussing this, the Shagayas bid the other couple goodnight and credits roll.

== Cast ==
- Nse Ikpe-Etim as Ajiri Shagaya
- Femi Jacobs as Chid Nebo
- Blossom Chukwujekwu as Lanre Shagaya
- Bayray McNwizu as Eugenia Nebo

== Release ==
The official trailer for The Visit was released on 22 September 2015, by FilmOne. It premiered at the cinemas on 16 October 2015.

== Reception ==
The Visit was generally met with positive reviews, mostly praised for its screenplay and the performances of the actors. Nollywood reinvented praised its novelty and rated it 76%. Tofarati Ige of E24-7 Magazine comments: "contrary to fears that the movie which is made up of just four cast, and set in a single location will be boring, there is no dull moment in the over two hours’ flick. The Visit is surely a film that's worth visiting the Cinema for". Bola Aduwo on Nollywood Access praises the performances and screenplay, and commenting that: "The Visit went well beyond my expectation. These four talented actors held us spellbound from the beginning of the film till the very end and had us shrieking with laughter and shouting for more. The fact that it was set in one location did nothing to deter us. Rather, like an onion, the characters of the couples were peeled away, revealing the layers of pretense they had been putting up for each other, after so many years of marriage". Xplore Nollywood commended the screenplay and the performances from the four actors, concluding that "The Visit is definitely a must see", and giving it 6.5 stars out of 10.

== See also ==
- List of Nigerian films
