= 2017 Golden Movie Awards =

African film award ceremony

The 2017 Golden Movie Awards is an annual African award ceremony that seeks to honor individuals for their outstanding performance in movies they featured as characters in the year under review. The ceremony was held at the Movenpick Ambassador Hotel in Accra.

The third annual edition was hosted by Nigerian comedian AY and actress host Osas Ajibade, the red carpet was hosted by Vica Michaels and Uti who were all from Nigeria.

== List of Winners ==
- Golden Honorary Award – Madam Grace Omaboe (Maame Dokono)
- Golden Actor (Comedy) – Lirotha McDonald (Samba)
- Golden Actress (Comedy) – Ade Kelly (Samba)
- Golden Supporting Actor (Comedy) – Dan Davies (A Trip To Jamaica)
- Golden Supporting Actress (Comedy) – Roselyn Ngissah (Amakye & Dede)
- Golden Actor (Drama) – O.C. Ukeje (Catch. ER)
- Golden Actress (Drama) – Kalsoume Sinare (Sala)
- Golden Supporting Actor (Drama) – Wale Ojo (Ayama)
- Golden Supporting Actress (Drama) – Emman Sinare (Sala)
- Golden Actor (Series) – Lirotha McDonald (Samba)
- Golden Actress (Series) – Ade Kelly (Samba)-
- Golden Most Promising Actor/Actress – Hauwa Alhahbura (3 Is A Crowd)
- Golden Discovery Actor/Actress – Emman Sinare (Sala)
- Golden Movie (Comedy) – A Trip to Jamaica
- Golden Movie – Lotanna
- Golden TV Series – Samba
- Golden Short Film – Bitter Sweet Wine
- Golden Indigenous – Daggers of Life
- Golden Story (Drama) – Sala
- Golden Sound – Lotanna
- Golden Writer (Comedy) – Ayo Makun (A Trip To Jamaica)
- Golden Writer (Drama) – Kobi Rana (Sala)
- Golden Art Director – Toka McBaror (Lotanna)
- Golden Director – Toka McBaror (Lotanna)
- Golden Editor – Laurenne Abdullah & Peter Sedufia (Keteke)
- Golden Cinematography – Toka McBaror (Lotanna)
- Golden Costumier – Lotanna
- Golden Make-up Artist – Sandra & Hakim (Slow Country)
