= IllRymz =

Nigerian television host

Illrymz
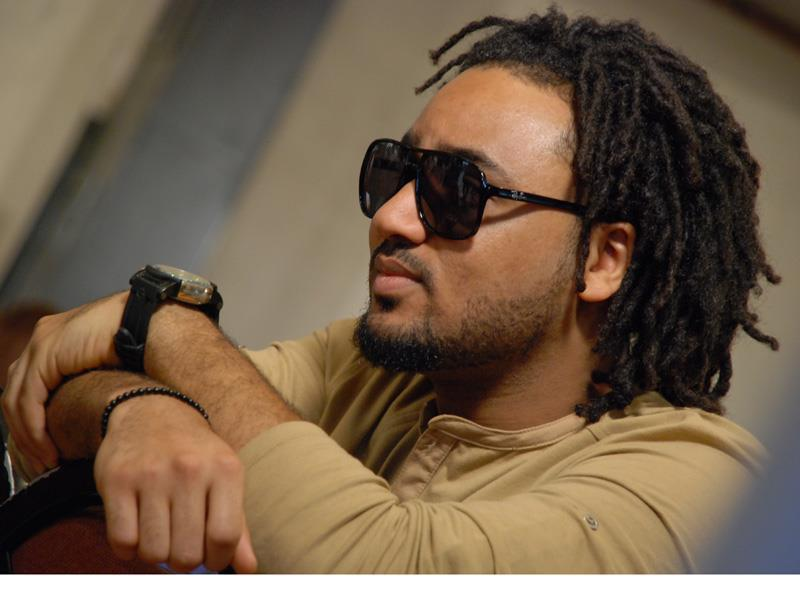
- Born: Olowu Bardia Adebola; 3 December 1985 (age 40) lagos, Nigeria
- Education: Unilag
- Occupations: Broadcaster, media personality, television host, radio personality, writer, producer, event MC, artiste and former model
- Years active: 2007–present
- Spouse: Omotara Odunusi

Illrymz (born Olowu Bardia Adebola; 3 December 1985) is a Nigerian television host, radio personality, writer, producer, event MC, artiste and former model. He is married to Omotara Odunusi.

He is the creator of the daily Instagram news show #SelfieNews and CEO of Contagious Collective, a creative media content company that has produced syndicated radio shows such as Radio Outloud with Nokia & ILL, The Jumia What Am I? Radio Show, Nunu Super Kids, and 0809ja_Radio. In 2016 he became the host of the Coke Studio Radio Hour produced in Los Angeles USA.

Illrymz's television credits include the host of Nigerian Idol, and co-host of StarGist, Soundcity, and Nigezie.

== Early life ==
Illrymz was born in Lagos to a Persian mother and Yoruba father. At the age of 3, he was used as a baby model for an American beauty product. From an early age he sang in the church choir, and always had a lead or major role in the church drama.

== Career ==
Fresh out of high school, he met Emmanuel Essien (aka Mannie) of Cool FM, while working on a radio commercial for Gold Circle condoms. The two bonded as Mannie was a music composer and Illrymz was learning how to use his rhymes to write copy for advertising agencies. Immediately work on his first album started. However, the album was never completed. Shortly after this, he was introduced to another Emmanuel by his brother, this time a rapper called Mannie-X.

They were later joined by Leo Abulu (aka Luvdaddy) who was a close friend of Mannie. They became a Gospel Group called SOL later in the year. After recording four songs, the group decided to rebrand and started working on a new album under a new name Konfused. Once again, six songs into the album, the project was abandoned.

In 2003 he appeared in television and print commercials for Coca-Cola. He went on to model for Benson and Hedges, and MTN, as well as appearing on the runway on shows such as the Nigerian Fashion Show and Fashion Week.

Illrymz went on to study Mass Communication at the University of Lagos in 2006.

In 2005, Illrymz, as a brand name, was born with the launch of Nigeria's First Online Entertainment Magazine – VibeWeekly. Working with Mtech Communications on the Vibedownloads brand for three years.

== Television ==
In 2007 IllRymz made his television debut as the host of Nokia First Chance. Later in 2007, he signed on to urban Nigerian music and lifestyle channel Nigezie as music content producer, brand manager, and on-air personality. During his short stint with Nigezie he set up its 24-hour program schedule, and organised celebrity interviews. In 2008, he signed a television deal with Soundcity where he hosted red carpet events, presented the Global Countdown show, Sprite Triple Slam, and One on One—the celebrity interview show—and produced and presented The Nokia Express Music show. In 2010 he became host of the G-Bam show but the show was cancelled abruptly. In 2011 he became the host of international music franchise, Nigerian Idol, which he hosted for season two alongside Nigerian RnB musician, Tiwa Savage, and seasons three, four and five (2012–2015). In late 2014 he joined the Africa Magic Team as the co-host of the pan African television show StarGist. In 2016 he joined the team of BET Africa as a presenter and insert producer for BET - A List.

== Radio ==
Illrymz produced the radio adverts for the MTV Africa Music Awards (MAMAS) show and went on to produce the 2008 and 2009 Awards radio commercials. He has also produced radio commercials for Nokia, Chicken Republic and Zain (now Airtel).

In early 2009 the Soundcity television brand established Soundcity Radio. Illrymz brought together the channel's ambassadors – Denrele Edun, S-Dot, and Yinka and set up 1-hour daily shows that ran on local radio stations from Monday to Sunday every week. The radio channel started off with music rotation and later transitioned into shows produced by Illrymz such as Nokia Top 5 Playlist hosted by illrymz, Sexy Tuesday hosted by Luvchild, Your Africa playlist hosted by S-Dot, and The Entertainer hosted by Denrele. The channel closed down when Illrymz resigned.

Later that year, he re-branded himself as The Big Homie and launched his own independent radio show sponsored by Nokia, Radio Outloud with Nokia. Starting off on two stations in Lagos the show expanded to six stations across Nigeria. The show showcases celebrities in unusual scenarios. It has featured musicians, actors, comedians, and producers and also UK funky house musician Donaeo, Jiggs from choice Fm London, Jimmie Jean Louis (The Haitian from Heroes & Mr Tunde from Phat Girls), Razz B (actor from DOOM) and Nate Parker from Great Debaters.

Illrymz has gone on to executive produce a series of radio shows under his creative media content company Contagious Collective such as The Jumia What Am I? Radio Show, 0809JA_Radio, Nunu Super Kids, The Wave, Pop Up & Shop, and The A-Team.

In late 2016 it was announced he would host the Coke Studio Radio Hour for Coca-Cola.

He is also the voice casting director for the first 3D animated cartoon series in Nigeria, The Idomietables by Indomie. Contagious Collective is also the production company behind the series' audio production.

== Music ==
In 2006 he released his first solo single, produced by Papilastic, titled "No Mago Mago!". Illrymz then went on a five-year hiatus from music. In late 2011 he "leaked" a single titled "Anyhow", produced by Nigerian producer Dr. Frabz. The singles "Pa Da Wa", featuring Dr. Frabs and Skales, and "Feel My Parol", produced by Samklef, followed. In 2012 Illrymz released the "official" single "Teacher Teacher", featuring Femi Kuti.
