= Osa Seven =

Nigerian graffiti artist

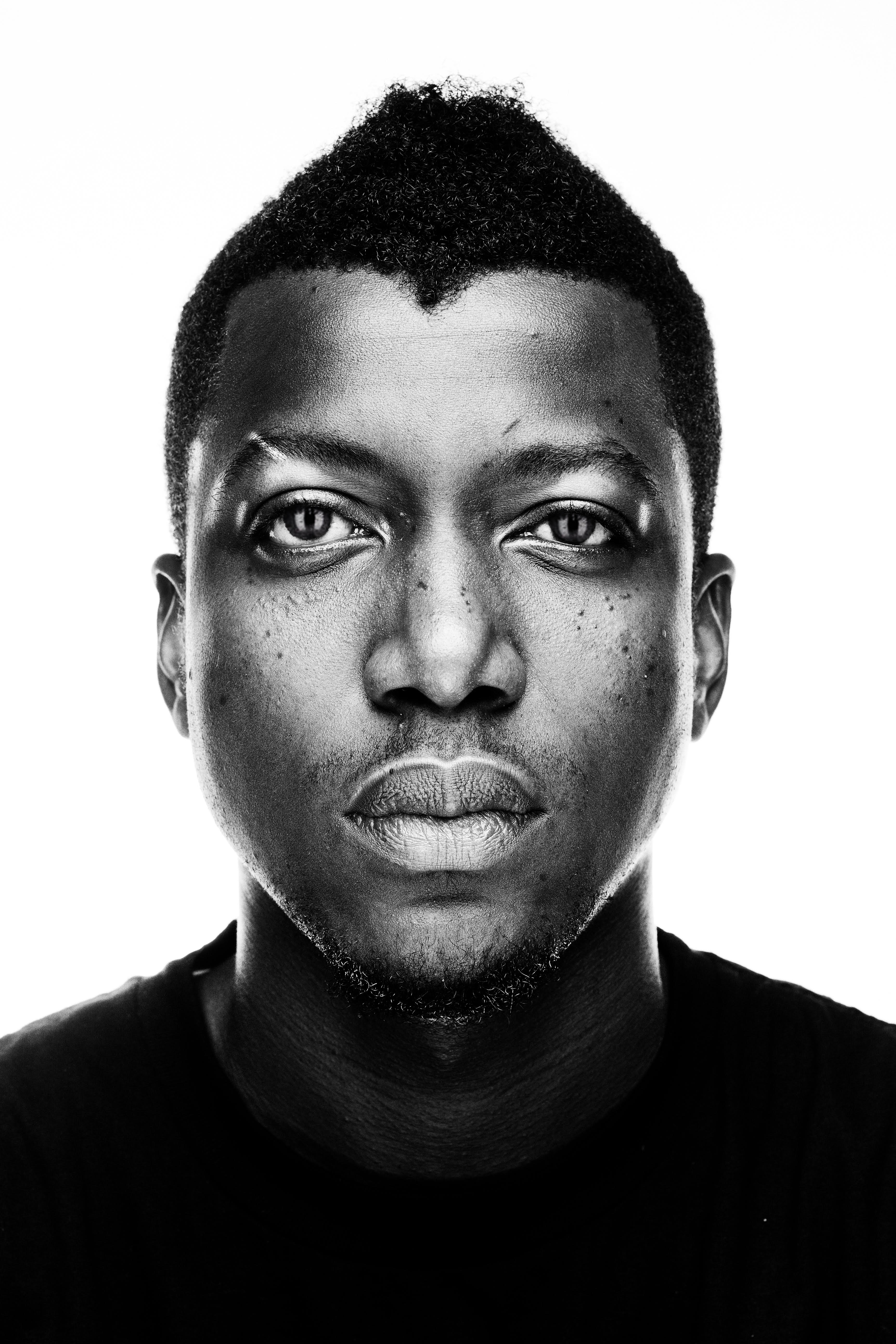
- Seven in 2017
- Born: Osa Okunkpolor; March 11, 1983 (age 43)
- Education: University of Lagos
- Years active: 2010
- Known for: Street art, graffiti, graphic design
- Website: osaseven.ng

Osa Okunkpolor (born 11 March 1983), simply known as Osa Seven, is a Nigerian graffiti artist, brand developer and GFX designer. His work ranges from portraits of iconic characters to scenic images, brand designs, abstract art, and tribal art designs.

== Education and career ==
Seven graduated with a bachelor's degree in Visual Communications from University of Lagos, Nigeria.

Seven has worked as a brand developer for Food Concepts Plc and ran the clothing brand Live Mechanics before the Osa Seven brand. Seven brand has since worked with the companies MTV, Jameson, Absolut Vodka, Pernod Ricard, HP, Africa, Guinness, Smirnoff, Heineken, The Federal Government of Nigeria.

Seven's first exhibition was The 7th Element: The first ever graffiti exhibition in Nigeria which was organised by Seven and his parent company A2 Creative. This exhibition was held at the Kia Motors showroom on Saturday, May 28 and Sunday, May 29, 2016. His second exhibition was Panorama: Osengwa, a US-based art retail platform, partners with Kuma Nation, a collective of non traditional artists, to host Panorama, a street and contemporary art viewing. Featuring live art installations, exhibitions from 12 African artists, including Seven.

== Social Influences ==
Seven, together with Socially Africa, co-founded "Art For A Cause" which is an initiative that uses Art to inspire children. Seven also volunteers at WormFreeZone and has taught classes at British Council and Goethe Institute workshops.

== Recognition and awards ==
Seven was featured on CNN Africa Voices

Seven was nominated for The Future Awards Africa 2016 category of "The Future Awards Africa Prize for Arts & Culture"
