= Victor Olaotan =

Nigerian actor (1952–2021)

- Born: 17 February 1952; Lagos, Nigeria
- Died: 26 August 2021 (aged 69)
- Education: University of Ibadan; Obafemi Awolowo University
- Occupation: Actor
- Notable work: Tinsel

Victor Olaotan// (17 February 1952 – 26 August 2021) was a Nigerian actor best known for his leading role in the soap opera Tinsel.

== Early life and education ==
He was born in Lagos, Nigeria, in 1952. He studied at the University of Ibadan, Obafemi Awolowo University, and Rockets University, United States.

== Career ==
He began his career as an actor when he joined the University of Ibadan theatre group, where he met other artists, such as Professor Wole Soyinka and Jimi Solanke among others. He became an actor at the age of 15 through a teacher who was a member of the Ori Olokun Theatre group in the early 70s, prior to the death of his father. After his father died, he traveled to the United States in 1978 but returned to Nigeria in 2002 to continue his career in acting. He gained more popularity in 2013 after his leading role in the Nigerian soap opera Tinsel which began airing in August 2008. The veteran actor was involved in a motor accident in October 2016 and suffered a nervous system injury. He was driving to a movie set when the accident took place around Apple Junction, in Festac, Lagos.

== Death ==
Olaotan died on 26 August 2021 aged 69 due to a brain injury caused by the car accident he was involved in October 2016.

== Filmography ==
- Tinsel (2008–2013) as Fred Ade-Williams
- Towo Tomo (2013)
- Finding Love (2014)
- Fifty (2015) as Martin
- Black Bird (2015) as Big Daddy
- Remember Me (2016) as Mr. Ovede
- Fusion (2016) as Mr. Peterson
- Three Wise Men (2016) as Tobere
- Alter Ego (2017) as Chief Adebisi
- Voiceless Scream (2018) as Mr. Benjamin Danjuma

== See also ==
- List of Nigerian actors
