= Tinsel (TV series) =

Nigerian soap opera

- Genre: Soap opera
- Created by: Yinka Ogun
- Written by: Yinka Ogun; Kemi Adesoye; Uju Asika; Tunde Babalola
- Directed by: Tope Oshin Ogun (2008 - 2013); Alex Mouth (2008 - 2010; 2012 - 2014); Efe Aiyeteni (2008 - 2009 ) John Njamah (2008 - 2009 ) Victor Aghahowa (2010 - 2014 ) Ben Chiadika (2010 - ) George Sunom Kura (2012 - ) Tolu Ajayi (2009 - 2010)
- Starring: Victor Olaotan; Funlola Aofiyebi-Raimi; Ireti Doyle; Damilola Adegbite; Chris Attoh; Funmi Holder; Udoka Oyeka; Osas Ighodaro; Gbenro Ajibade; Linda Ejiofor; Bimbo Manuel; Oghenekaro Itene; Matilda Obaseki; Tomi Odunsi; Wendy Lawal; Leonora Okine; Kalu Ikeagwu; Lizz Njagah; Abiola Segun Williams; Anne Njemanze; Florence Uwaleke; Ike Okechukwu; Gregory Ojefua; Nini Mbonu; Yul Edochie; Alex Okoroji; Samuel Abiola Robinson; Fisayo Ajisola; Adesewa Josh; Chris Okagbue; Wale Dizzy Akinjogbin
- Country of origin: Nigeria
- Original language: English
- No. of seasons: 19
- No. of episodes: 4400

Production
- Executive producer: Jaiye Ojo
- Producers: Rogers Ofime; Lemmy Adebule; Femi Odugbemi
- Production locations: Lagos, Lagos State, Nigeria
- Camera setup: Multi-camera
- Running time: 25 minutes

Original release
- Network: M-Net
- Release: 1 August 2008 – present

Tinsel is a Nigerian soap opera that began airing in August 2008. On 23 May 2013, the show's 1000th episode aired. It has been called "the most successful television drama on Nigerian television in recent times". On 23 April 2015, the show aired its 1500th episode.On 23 March 2017, the show aired the 2000th episode of the series.On 21 February 2019, the show aired its 2500th episode.On 21 Jan 2021, the show's 3000th episode aired. On 21 December 2022, the show aired a special 3500th documentary. On 21 November 2024 the show hit 4000 episodes.

== Series overview ==
Series	Episodes	Originally released	
Series	Episodes	First released	Last released
1	65	1 September 2008	2009
2	156	2009	2010
3	261	31 May 2010	30 May 2011
4	261	31 May 2011	29 May 2012
5	261	30 May 2012	29 May 2013
6	260	30 May 2013	28 May 2014
7	260	29 May 2014	27 May 2015
8	260	28 May 2015	25 May 2016
9	260	26 May 2016	24 May 2017
10	260	25 May 2017	23 May 2018
11	260	24 May 2018	22 May 2019
12	260	23 May 2019	20 May 2020
13	260	21 May 2020	19 May 2021
14	260	20 May 2021	18 May 2022
15	260	19 May 2022	17 May 2023
16	260	18 May 2023	15 May 2024
17	260	16 May 2024	14 May 2025
18	260	15 May 2025	13 May 2026
19	TBA	August 3, 2026	2027

== Plot summary ==
Tinsel's plot revolves around two rival film companies: Reel Studios, founded by Fred Ade-Williams (Victor Olaotan), and Odyssey Pictures, headed by Brenda "Nana" Mensah (Funmilola Aofiyebi-Raimi). Tinsel is a tale of drama, romance, betrayal and triumph. The show returned for its eighth season on 25 May 2015.

== Cast ==
- Victor Olaotan as Fred Ade Williams (2008–13)
- Gideon Okeke as Philip Ade Williams (2008–2017, 2023)
- Funlola Aofiyebi-Raimi as Brenda Nana Mensah (2009 – 2023;2025)
- Funmi Holder as Amaka Ade Williams (2008 – present)
- Matilda Obaseki as Angela Dede (2008-2016, 2019-2022)
- Chris Attoh as Kwame Mensah (2008–2013)
- Kunle Coker as Ziggy (2008–2012)
- Ireti Doyle as Sheila Ade-Williams (2009 – present)
- Gbenro Ajibade as Soji Bankole (2008–2017)
- Damilola Adegbite as Telema Duke (2008–2012, 2015–2017)
- Linda Ejiofor as Bimpe (2008 – present)

== Production ==
Tinsel was in pre-production for over ninety months. Over 500 actors auditioned for the lead role of Fred Ade-Williams before the decision to cast Victor Olaotan was made. As of June 2013, the show's production cost per minute was 900 dollars, and total costs exceeded four billion naira. The show was shot in a studio in Ojota, Lagos until March 2013 when a fire destroyed that location. Since then the show has been shot at a studio and a private residence in Ikeja, Lagos.

It airs on AM Urban and AM Family.

== Awards and nominations ==
Year	Award	Category	Result	Ref
2022	Africa Magic Viewers' Choice Awards	Longest running TV show in Africa	Won	
