= Fella Makafui =

Ghanaian actress

- Born: Fella Precious Makafui; August 19, 1995 (age 30); Anfoega, Volta Region, Ghana
- Citizenship: Ghanaian
- Education: Presbyterian College of Education, Akropong
- Occupations: Actress; Singer; Entrepreneur
- Years active: 2015–present
- Spouse: Medikal (m. 2020–2024)
- Children: 1
- Awards: Golden Most Promising, Golden Movie Awards (2016)

Fella Precious Makafui (born 19 August 1995) is a Ghanaian actress, entrepreneur, and philanthropist.

She is best known for her role in the Ghanaian TV series YOLO (You Only Live Once). She was born in Anfoega Akukome, in the Volta Region of Ghana, and raised there after her father reportedly abandoned the family when she was young.

== Personal life and education ==
Fella was born on 19 August 1995 in the Volta Region, Ghana. She completed her junior high school at Kabore School Complex and her secondary education at Kpando Senior High School, before attending the University of Ghana.

She married Ghanaian rapper Medikal in March 2020. The couple have a daughter named Island. After four years of marriage, they announced their divorce in March 2024.

== Career ==
Makafui began her career as a model. She later went into acting, rising to fame for her role in YOLO. She has since featured in several Ghanaian and Nigerian films, including Swings, Once Upon a Family, Kada River, and Chaskele.

In Once Upon a Family, she acted alongside Nigerian actress Mercy Johnson, who played the lead role. In 2025, she earned a role in the Season 2 of the Nigerian Netflix series Aníkúlápó.

She is also the ambassador for Castle Gate Estate.

== Awards ==
- Most Promising Actress of the Year – City People Entertainment Awards (2016)
- Golden Most Promising – Golden Movie Awards (2016)

== Selected filmography ==
- Kada River (2018) – Nadia
- Sugar (2019) – Whitney
- Away Bus (2019) – Kiki
- Till Deaf Do Us Part (2023)
- Resonance (2024)
- Fata (2024)
