= Chris Attoh =

Ghanaian actor and film director

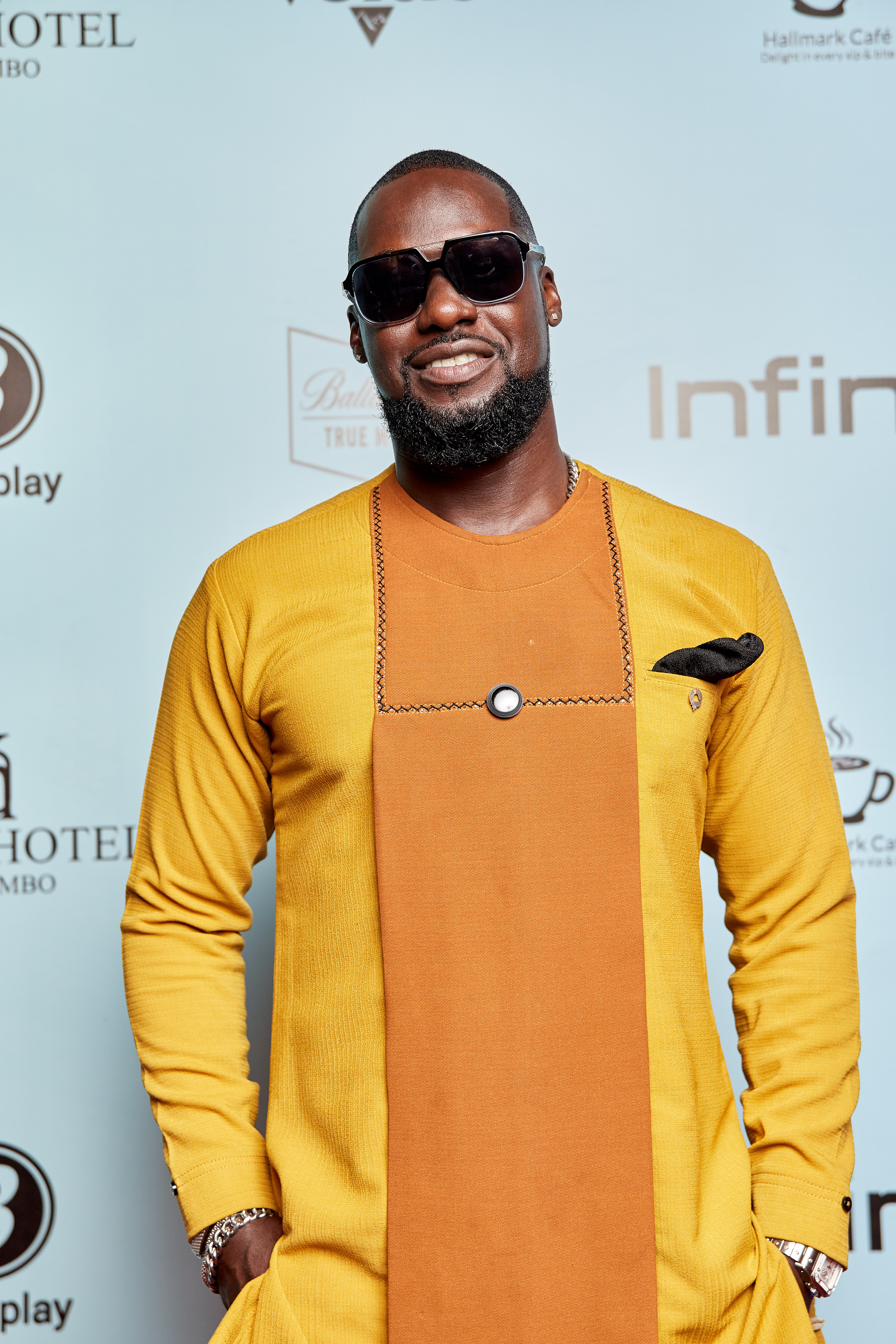
- Born: Christopher Keith Nii Attoh; May 17, 1979 (age 46); Ghana
- Education: New York Film Academy, Achimota School and Accra Academy
- Occupations: Actor; television presenter; producer
- Known for: Tinsel, The Perfect Picture, Sylvia, Scorned, Flower girl
- Spouses: Damilola Adegbite (divorced); Bettie Jennifer (m. 2018)
- Children: 1

Chris Attoh (born Christopher Keith Nii Attoh; May 17, 1979) is a Ghanaian actor, film director, on-air personality, television presenter, and producer. He is best known as "Kwame Mensah" in the Nigerian soap opera Tinsel.

== Education ==
Attoh attended the New York Film Academy, Achimota School and Accra Academy. At Accra Academy, his classmates included the media businessman and radio personality Nathan Adisi. He then moved on to KNUST where he studied for a Bachelor of Art in Painting degree. He later went to London to study banking and securities.

== Career ==
=== Film and television ===
Attoh’s career skyrocketed when he landed a role in the popular Nigerian television series Tinsel, where he played the character "Kwame Mensah." This role not only solidified his status as one of the leading actors in Africa but also opened doors for numerous other opportunities in the film industry across the continent. Attoh's versatility as an actor is evident in his performances in various films, including Six Hours to Christmas and Flower Girl. His ability to seamlessly switch between roles in romantic comedies and intense dramas has earned him critical acclaim.

Attoh has significantly contributed to the growth and global recognition of African cinema. Through his work, he has challenged stereotypes and portrayed African stories with authenticity and depth. His performances have not only garnered international attention but have also paved the way for African actors in Hollywood. Attoh’s involvement in various pan-African film projects has further strengthened his influence, making him a key figure in the contemporary African film industry.

He co-hosted the 2016 edition of the Vodafone Ghana Music Awards with Naa Ashorkor and DJ Black. He was also the MC of the 2014 edition of the F.A.C.E. List Awards in New York City along with Sandra Appiah.

On Saturday, 1 June 2024, he co-hosted the 25th Telecel Ghana Music Awards (TGMA) with Naa Ashorkor Mensah-Doku.

=== Entrepreneurship and philanthropy ===
Attoh is also an entrepreneur with an interest in the entertainment business. He founded A Factory Limited, a multimedia production company focused on creating high-quality content for African audiences. This venture highlights his commitment to not only starring in films but also producing and directing projects that reflect African culture. Attoh's entrepreneurial spirit extends to his work as a television host and a brand ambassador for various companies.

Attoh is also known for his philanthropic efforts. He has been involved in various initiatives aimed at improving the lives of underprivileged communities in Ghana and across Africa. Through his platform, he advocates for education, youth empowerment, and the arts. His commitment to giving back to society has earned him recognition, and he continues to use his influence to effect positive change.

== Personal life ==
Attoh's personal life has been marked by both triumphs and tragedies. His marriage to Bettie Jennifer, an American businesswoman, ended in tragedy when she was fatally shot in 2019. This event thrust Attoh into the international spotlight. He continues to honor her memory while maintaining his focus on his career and personal growth.

He was previously married to Damilola Adegbite, but was reported to be divorced in September 2017. He remarried on Saturday, 6 October 2018, to Bettie Jennifer, a US-based businesswoman, at a private ceremony in Accra.

== Filmography ==
=== Films ===
- Nine (2023)
- Sylvia (2020)
- The Perfect Picture (2009) as Larry
- The Perfect Picture: Ten Years Later (2019) as Larry Stevens
- An Accidental Zombie (Named Ted) (2018) as Ricky
- In line (2017) as David
- A Trip to Jamaica (2016) as Tayo
- Happiness is a Four-Letter Word (2016) as Chris
- Flower Girl (2013) as Umar Abubakar
- Journey to Self (2012) as Dapo
- Single and Married (2012) as Jay
- Bad Luck Joe (2018) as Joe
- Scorned (2008) as Orlando Thompson
- Life and Living It (2007) as Ray Austin
- Esohe (2017) as Ifagbai
- A Soldier's Story 2; Return from the Dead (2020) as Logan
- Love and Cancer (2017)
- Love and War (2013) as Daniel
- Moving On (2013) as Taye
- Closure Mandate (2022) as Dele
- International Affairs (2018) as Bode
- Lotanna (2017) as Kojo
- The Rangers: Shadows Rising (2016) as Garrin
- Sinking Sands (2010) as Mensah
- One More Day
- The In-laws (2017) as Tobi
- Potato Potahto (2017) as Gabby
- Kintampo (2018)
- All About Love (2017) as Ryan
- Choices (2020)
- Somniphobia (2021) as Dr. Brady
- Lovers Discretion (2021) as Will
- James Town (2016)
- Six hours To Christmas (2010) as Reggie
- Swings (2017)
- Sinister Stepsister (2022) - Lifetime Movie Network
- Aborted Assignment (2023) as Kola
- Finding Odera (2023) as Eric
- The American Society of Magical Negroes (2024) as Ghanaian Businessperson
- I'm Sorry Son (2024) as Ray

=== Television ===
- A House Divided (2019–2020) as Nigel
- Fifty—The Series (2020) as Francis
- BRAT TV (2020)
- Tinsel (2008–2013)
- Shuga - Season 3 (2013–2015)

=== Web ===
- Our Best Friend's Wedding - Season 1 (2017)
