= Uche Montana =

Nigerian actress

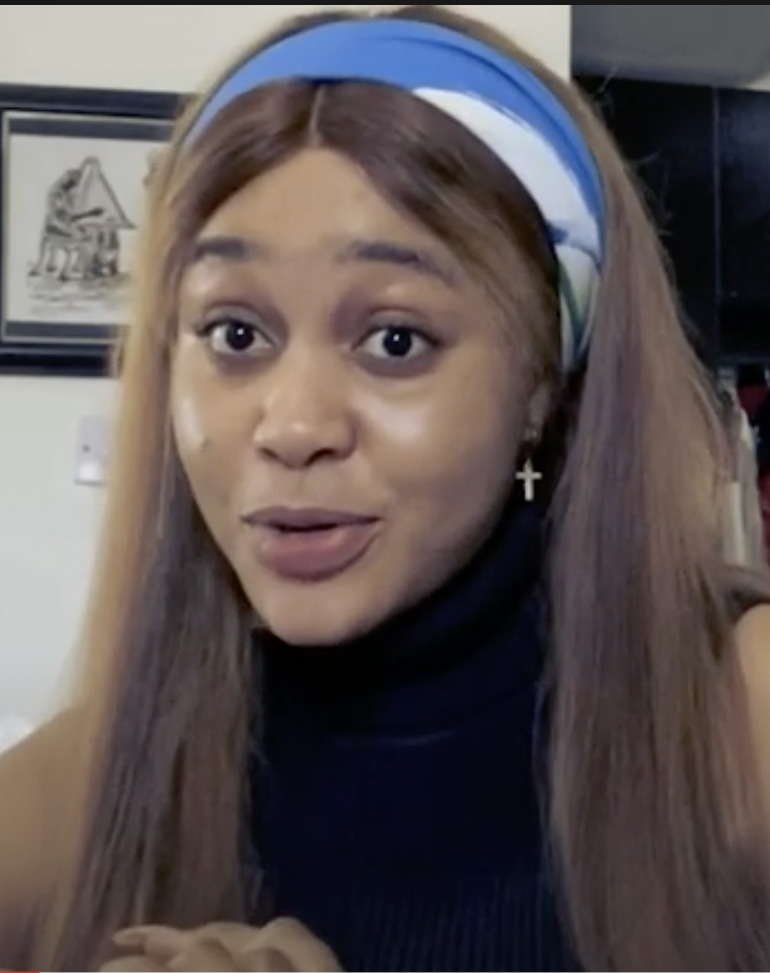
- Born: 8 May 1997 (age 29); Lagos, Nigeria
- Citizenship: Nigerian
- Education: Adeniran Ogunsanya College of Education
- Occupation: Actress
- Years active: 2015–present
- Awards: Maya Awards Africa for Best Supporting Actress in TV Series. Trailblazer 2026 AMVCA12#

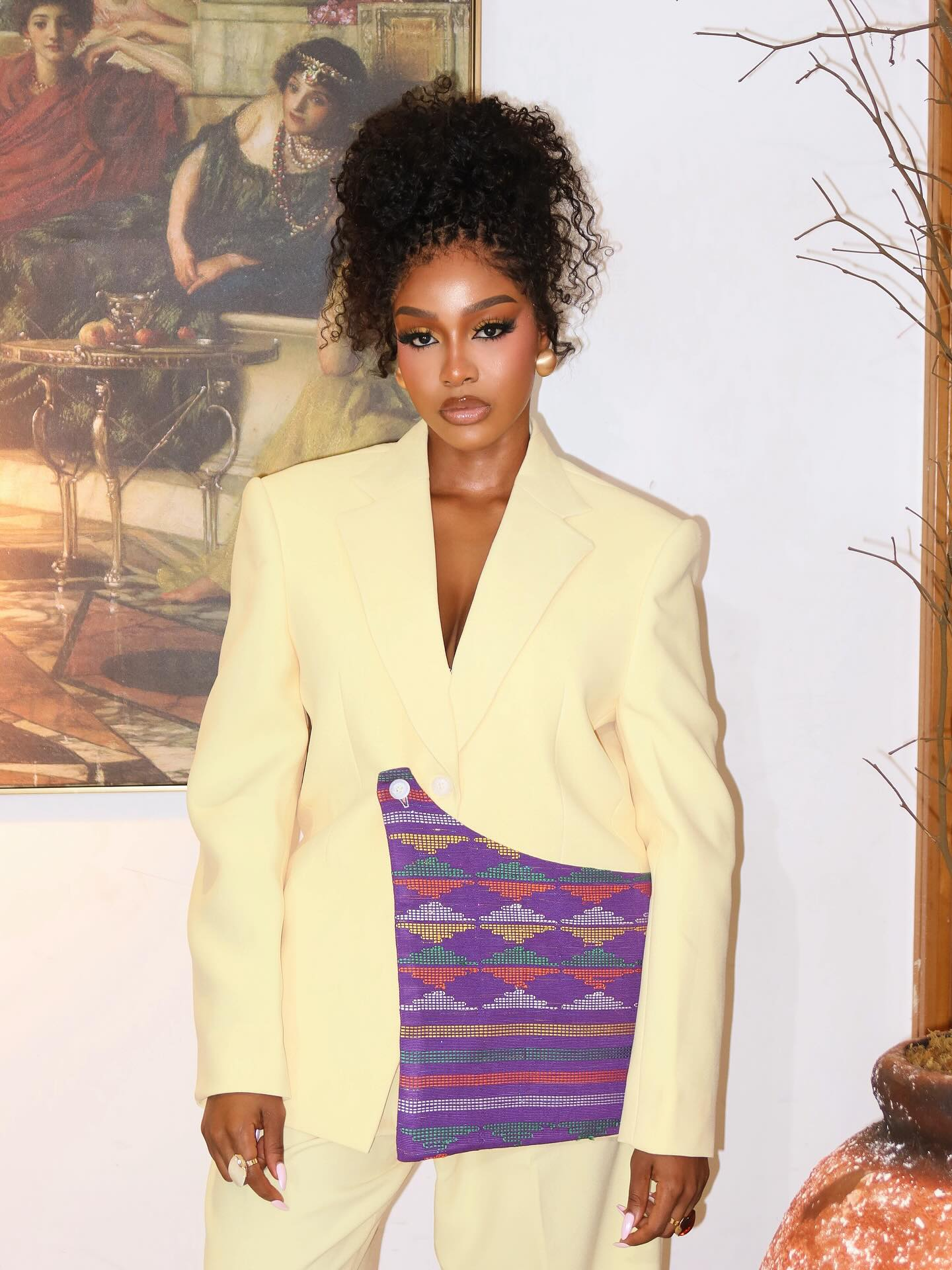
Uche Montana Bells of Freedom.

Uche Montana (born 8 May 1997) is a Nigerian actress, model, screenwriter, film producer, and digital content creator. She gained prominence following her role in the Africa wisdom television series Hush (2016–2017), which earned her the MAYA Awards Africa for Best Supporting Actress in a TV Series.

She is the founder and CEO of Montana Media, a Nigerian film production company.

== Early life and education ==
Uche Montana was born in Lagos State, Nigeria, and raised in Festac Town. She hails from Ibusa in Delta state and is of Igbo descent. She attended Loral International School and later studied at Adeniran Ogunsanya College of Education, Lagos, where she obtained a diploma in Law. Her educational background reflects a structured academic foundation prior to her transition into acting and filmmaking.

== Career ==
2015–2016: Early Career

Montana began her acting career in 2015, making her debut in Poison Ivy. This marked her entry into Nollywood and laid the groundwork for her professional growth.

2016–2018: Breakthrough

Her breakthrough came with the Africa Magic series Hush (2016–2017), which gained widespread viewership across Africa.

Her performance earned her the MAYA Awards Africa for Best Supporting Actress, a recognition that established her as a rising talent in the Nigerian film industry.

According to The Punch, in an interview, she emphasized her dedication to acting and commitment to her career.

2018–2021: Rise to Prominence

Following her breakthrough, Montana appeared in several notable Nollywood productions, including Banana Island Ghost (2017), The Eve (2018), Lagos Real Fake Life (2018), Made in Heaven (2019), Hire a Woman (2019). During this period, she built a reputation for emotional range and versatility in acting.

2021–Present: Expansion and Digital Transition

From 2021 onward, Montana expanded into screenwriting and film production, reflecting broader Nollywood trends of multi-skilled creatives.

She has been featured in projects such as:

- Dream Job (2021)
- Women & Lies (2021)
- Teni's Big Day (2023)
- The Silent Intruder (2024)

Her continued relevance highlights her adaptability within an evolving entertainment industry, and this has seen her feature in blockbusters such as

- Thin Line (2024)
- Behind The Scenes (2025), the highest-grossing movie in Africa.

YouTube and Digital Success

In recent years, Uche Montana has leveraged YouTube as a major distribution platform for Nollywood content.

Her films released on YouTube have attracted hundreds of thousands to millions of views (UchemontanaTV), reflecting a shift in audience consumption from traditional television to digital streaming platforms.

This trend aligns with the broader Nollywood movement toward direct-to-audience distribution, enabling filmmakers to reach global audiences without traditional gatekeepers.

Artistry and Style

Montana is known for portraying emotionally complex characters, particularly in romantic and dramatic roles.

She has been described in industry commentary as a performer capable of elevating storytelling through expressive delivery and authenticity.

Name and Branding

Originally credited as Uche Nwaefuna, she later adopted the professional name Uche Montana as part of a strategic rebranding to enhance global recognition and career positioning.

== Filmography ==
Filmography
Year	Title	Character	Alongside
2025	Christmas to remember	Uche Montana	Maurice Sam
2024	Wedding Night Blues	Wonuola Ezekiel	Uzor Arukwe Tochi Akparanta Kamil Audu Chijindu Aniakor
2024	The Silent Intruder	Catherine Philips	Venita Akpofure; Pere Egbi; Kachi Nnochiri; Lucy Ameh
2023	Teni's Big Day		Nancy Isime; IK Ogbonna; Keppy Ekpenyong; Maurice Sam
2021	Women & Lies		Bimbo Ademoye; Jessica Agu; Lucy Ameh
2021	Hide N Seek	Uche Montana	Kiki Omeili; Mojisola Adebayo; Bimbo Ademoye
2021	Dream Job	Nkechi Okafor	Pearl Agwu; Sophie Alakija; Toners Beshel
2021	Tango of Deception		Frederick Leonard; Christina Martin; Nini Mbonu
2021	Oldest Bridesmaid	Vivian	Munachi Abii; Efe Israel; Jimmy Odukoya
2021	My Grand Father's Wife	Munachi Snr.	Adebola Adejumobi; Denyeefa David Abraham
2020	Doubt	Rita	Bimbo Ademoye; Gloria Hanson; Mr. Macaroni
2019	Seven	Efe	Sadiq Daba; Kehinde Anyị; Ogunsanwo Anita
2019	Made in Heaven	Angel	Toyin Abraham; Blossom Chukwujekwu; Lasisi Elenu; Nancy Isime
2019	Hire a Woman	Toyosi	Belinda Effah; Alexx Ekubo; Nancy Isime; Uzor Arukwe
2019	Mad About you	Tommi	Stephen Damian; Chinyere Wilfred; Annie Macaulay-Idibia
2018	Lagos Real Fake Life	Precious	IK Ogbonna; Mike Ezuruonye; Nosa Rex; Emmanuella Samuel; Mark Angel
2018	The Eve	Bolanle	Beverly Naya; John Okafor; Jagila Donatus; Tina Mba
2018	Homely:What Men Want	Suzy	Femi Branch; Mary Lazarus; Tina Mba
2017	Banana Island Ghost	Tope	Ali Nuhu; Tina Mba; Uche Jumbo; Dorcas Shola-Fapson
2017	Three Wise Men	Essei	Tina Mba; Richard Mofe-Damijo; Ebele Okaro; Zack Orji; Imabong Effiong

== Accolades ==
Awards and Nominations
Year	Awards	Category	Results	Refs
2026	2026 AMVCA Awards	Trailblazer	Won	
2025	2025 AMVCA Awards	Best Actress-Thinline	Nominated	
2018	2018 Best of Nollywood Awards	Best Supporting Actress (English)- What Men Want	Nominated	
2018	Maya Awards Africa	Best Actress in TV Series-Hush	Won	
