= Hailliote Sumney =

Ghanaian actress

- Born: Hailliote Sumney
- Education: University of California, Riverside
- Occupations: Actress, brand influencer, TV personality

Hailliote Sumney also known as Haillie Sumney is a Canadian-born Ghanaian actress and brand influencer. She has interviewed celebs such as actor Boris Kodjoe, Michael Blackson, Becca, Stonebwoy and others. She is the female brand ambassador for London-based shoe brand Jesu Segun. In 2019 she was selected as the host for 4Syte TV's BET Awards red carpet.

== Early life and education ==
Sumney was born in Canada to Kodjoe Sumney and Akosuah Sumney but moved to the United States when she was two years old. She studied nursing at the Summit Career College, California and also had her tertiary education at the University of California, Riverside.

== Career ==
She quit her career as a nurse at the Riverside Hospital in United States to pursue acting in Africa. She made her acting debut starring in a TV series, Heels and Sneakers which was produced by Yvonne Nelson. She has also featured in Lagos Fake Life, a movie produced by Mike Ezuruonye, starred as a character in Mike Ezu's "To kill a ghost" including already released TV series, Eden and has also worked on projects featured on popular streaming networks including Netflix, Amazon Prime and IROKOtv. She also debuted on television at 4Syte TV as a presenter.

== Works ==
- She is known to have worked on a movie titled A Way Back Home, which features Alexx Ekubo, IK Ogbonna, and others.

== Filmography ==
Year	Film	Role	Notes
2016	Heels and Sneakers (series)		produced by Yvonne Nelson, Efia Odo
	A way back home		with Alex Ekubo, IK Ogbonna
2017	Kintampo		produced by Chris Attoh, also starring Adjetey Annan, Sika Osei and Deyemi Okanlawon
	Desperate Survivors		produced by Samuel De Graft featuring Kalsonme Sinare and Benedicta Gafah
2018	Lagos Real Fake Life	Mirabel	Produced by Mike Ezeronye also starring Annie Idibia, Emmanuella (Mark Angel Comedy)
	Track of My Fears		produced by Ama K.Aberese and starring Rama Brew, Marie Humbert, and Blossom Chukwujekwu
2018	Shattered (short film)		produced by Haillie Sumney featuring Ian Wordi and directed by Chris Gyan
2019	Twisted		starring Fela Makafui, James Gardener
2019	2 Days after Friday		produced by Venus Films, starring Jackie Appiah, Mofe Duncan, John Domelo
2019	Smoke Screen	Maeve Grant	directed by Vickie Wills-Doku, starring Rama Brew, Blossom Chukwujekwu, Marie Humbert-Droz, David Dontoh
2020	Eden		directed by Harry Bentil, starring Solomon Fixon-Owoo, Kobby Acheampong, Godwin Namboh
	A Woman's Scorn		directed by Maxwell Akwesi, starring James Gardener, Anthony Woode, Ekow Blankson and featuring Fela Makafui
	Trapped		directed by Eazzy Ologe starring IK Ogbonna
	Soft Work	Nonye	directed by Darasen Richards, starring Shaffy Bello, Frank Donga, Mofe Duncan, Alexx Ekubo, IK Ogbonna
2021	Ghana Jollof		directed by Uzor Arukwe, Funnybone, Akah Nnani, Joselyn Dunmas
2022	Co Habits		directed by Peter Sedufa, starring Fiifi Coleman, Caroline Sampson, Jeffery Nortey, Jackie Ankrah
2023	To Kill a Ghost	Sharon	Directed by Mike Ezuruonye, starring Pat Akpabio, Lovelin Akpan, Treasure Bassey
