= Nchifor Valery =

Cameroonian television personality (born 1989)

- Born: Bamenda, Cameroon
- Education: University of Buea
- Occupation: Actor
- Known for: The movie Obsession
- Notable work: A Man for the Weekend
- Awards: Best male actor at the 2011 London-run ZAFAA Award

Nchifor Valery is a Cameroonian television personality. He is known for the movie Obsession, for which he won best male actor at the 2011 London-run ZAFAA Award. He also won best male actor in a lead role at the red feather award 2017.

== Background ==
Valery was a born Cameroon. He graduated with B.Ed in education at the University of Buea.

== Career ==
Valery started his professional career as a television actor in Buea, in the movie Leather Gangsters, released in 2006 . “The high point of my career so far being when I was nominated for best up coming at the ZAFAA global awards (ZAFAA) in London were I traveled to and won the award in the particular category amongst big names from Ghana Nigeria and south Africa. ”, Valery told Njokatv. He has featured in over 40 movies which include short films, television series. In 2012 he was the best actor in a supporting role which earn him another award in that category at the Cameroon Movie Merit Awards, CMMA, edition 2012 organized by Fred Keyanti.

== Selected filmography ==
- A Man for the Weekend (2017) with Syndy Emade, Alexx Ekubo
- Obsession (2011)
- Leather Gangsters
- Expression

== Awards and recognition ==
Year	Award	Category	Result
2011	ZAFAA Award	Best upcoming actor	Won
Year	Award	Category	Result
2017	Read Feather)	Best actor supporting role	Won

== See also ==
- List of Cameroonian Actors
- Cinema of Cameroon
