= Uzor Arukwe =

Nigerian actor

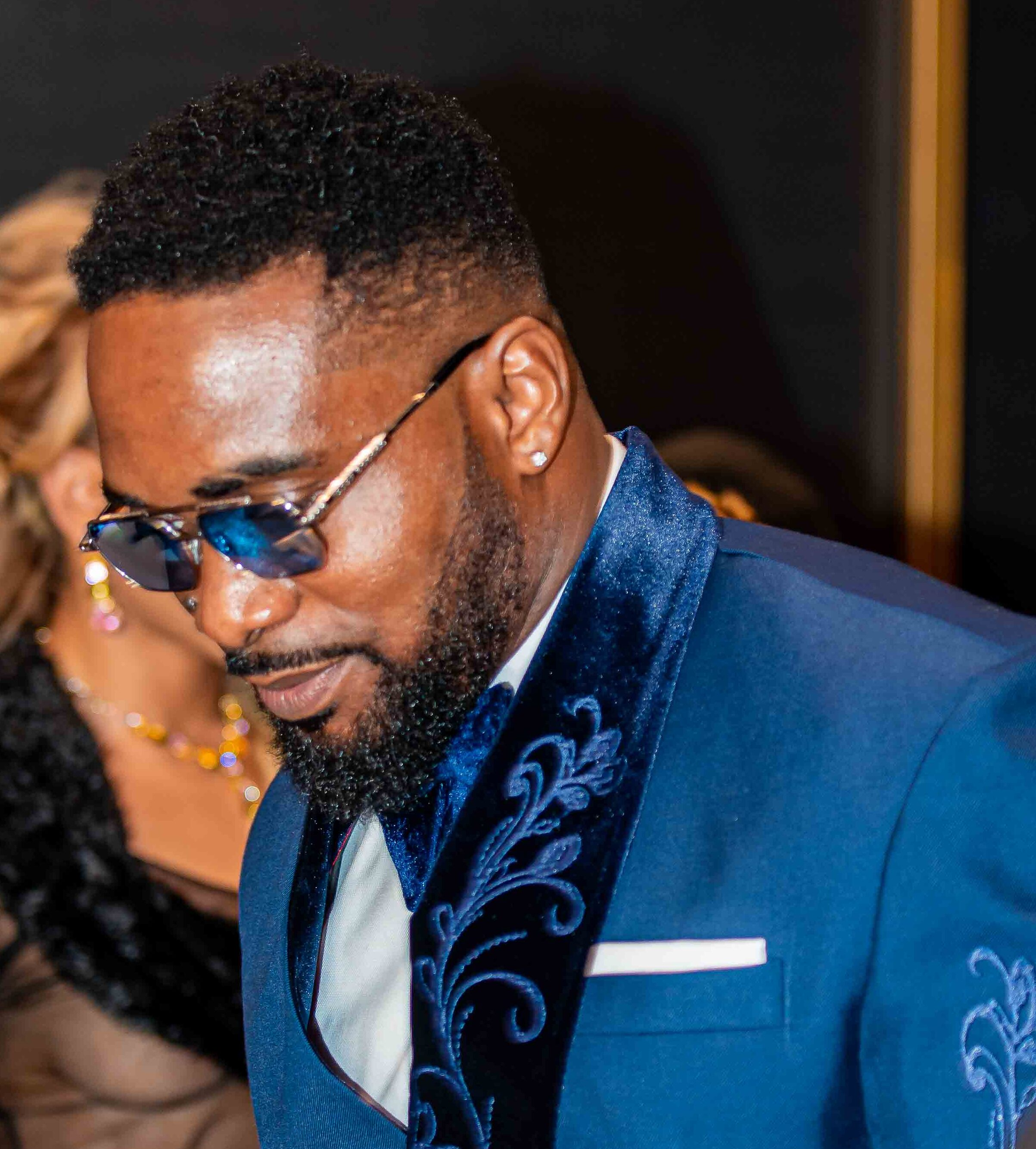
- Born: August 6, 1983 (age 43)
- Occupation: Actor
- Years active: 2014 – present
- Known for: His role as Inspector Sam in Sergeant Tutu
- Notable work: A Tribe Called Judah, Momiwa, Love in Every Word

Uzor Arukwe (born August 6, 1983) is a Nigerian actor, filmmaker and producer. Known for his work on screen and stage. and across many genres.

Arukwe began his career in Nigeria with the 2014 film Unspoken Truth. In 2022, his breakthrough came with lead roles in Chief Daddy 2: Going for Broke.

== Early life and education ==
Uzor Arukwe was born on 6 August 1983 in Surulere Lagos State, Nigeria, but he comes from Nkwerre, Imo State in South-eastern Nigeria. Arukwe was raised in a polygamous family, his father had two wives and three kids, Including Arukwe and his brother, Ebuka . He attended the Nigerian Navy Secondary School, Port Harcourt. Arukwe earned a Bachelor of Science in economics from the University of Abia State, while his second academic degree in Master of Business Administration from the University of Calabar.

In an interview by Chude Jideonwo, Arukwe, said his father did not approve of his career choice, and did not accept him being in the movie business. Arukwe explained that his mother was also hesitant about his career decision at first because of his father’s opinions but then agreed.

== Career ==
Arukwe made his Nollywood debut in 2014 in the movie Unspoken Truth but gained recognition for his role in Sergeant Tutu. His role as a private investigator in the 2019 movie, Code Wilo also earned him more recognition. He received 2 nominations for ‘Best Actor in Comedy or Movie’ in the 2020 African Magic Viewers' Choice Award for his roles in Smash and Size 12 respectively and a nomination for 'Best Actor' in the 2021 Best of Nollywood Awards for his role in Yours Regardless.

For his performance in the film Colors of Fire, Arukwe won the Best Actor award at the 2026 Africa Magic Viewers' Choice Awards (AMVCA).

== Nomination ==
He was nominated in the 2020 African Magic Viewers' Choice Award (AMVCA) and in the 2021 Best of Nollywood Awards.

For his appearance in the films Size 12 and Smash, he was nominated twice for the 2020 African Magic Viewer's Choice Award for ''Best Actor in Comedy or Movie''.

== Filmography ==
=== Films ===
Year	Title	Role	Notes
2014	Unspoken Truth	Martins	Debut role
2015	Fine Girl	Gregory	Alongside Ozzy Agu, Grace-Charis Bassey
2016	Size 12	Fred	Alongside Bimbo Ademoye, Yemi Blaq
2017	Sergeant Tutu	Inspector Sam	Alongside Funny Bone, Tunji Aderibigbe
2017	In Line	Debo Devi	Alongside Esosa Adah, Elsie Ajokku, Chris Attoh
2018	Kayanmata	Fola	Alongside Fred Amata, Ayo Adesanya Hassan
2018	Blood Letters	Chris	Alongside Yvonne Enakhena, Efe Irele
2018	Smash		Alongside Bolanle Ninalowo, Funny Bone, Iyabo Ojo
2019	Sugar Rush	Knight	Alongside Bimbo Ademoye and Bisola Aiyeola
2019	The Set Up	Pastor Dimeji	Alongside Dakore Akande and Adesua Etomi
2019	Boys Will Be Boys	Mike	Alongside Blessing Anietie, Promise Awoke
2019	Hire a Woman	Jide	Alongside Nancy Isime and Alexx Ekubo
2019	Kpali		Alongside Nkem Owoh and Ini-Dima Okojie
2019	Size 12	Jide	Alongside Maryjane Bologi, Grace Asuowo, Mary Lazarus
2019	Code Wilo		
2019	She is	Pastor Chike	Alongside Chiwetalu Agu, Ime Bishop Umoh
2020	Kambili: The Whole 30 Yards	Bankole	Alongside Nancy Isime and Elvina Ibru
2020	Dear Affy	Kelechi	Alongside Toyin Abraham, Bimbo Ademoye, Seilat Adebowale
2020	Through the Wire	Ehiz	Alongside Bimbo Ademoye, Chioma Agulefo
2020	A Thousand Ways to Break a Cheating Man	Tami	Alongside Bimbo Ademoye, Ray Adeka, Ivy Blessing Agbo
2020	Tanwa Savage	Jola	Alongside Segun Arinze, Bimbo Ademoye, Nkechi Blessing
2021	Prophetess	Eze-Ego	Alongside Toyin Abraham and Kehinde Bankole
2021	Dwindle	Male Saint	Alongside Swanky JKA and Broda Shaggi
2021	Progressive Tailors Club	Mazi Chibuzor	Alongside Adesina Adebayo, Alakija Adebayo, Femi Adebayo
2021	Enemy Closer	Owen	Alongside Grace-Charis Bassey, Nini Mbonu
2021	Hell's Candidate	Dubem	Alongside Fred Amata, Uche Ben
2021	The Blood Covenant	Jite	Alongside Shalewa Ashafa, Tobi Bakre, Akexx Ekubo
2022	Chief Daddy 2: Going for Broke	Prince Sonny	Alongside Chika Agwuike, Dakore Akande, Violet Akhator
2022	Finding Me	Jidenna	Alongside Rita Anyabuwa, Gift Eyimba
2022	The Man for the Job	Joseph	Alongside Rita Anwarah, Akintoba Adeoluwa
2022	Head Over Bills	Jesse	Alongside Bimbo Ademoye, Kehinde Adeboyega
2023	A Tribe Called Judah	Chigozie Onuaha	Alongside Funke Akindele, Jide Kene Achufusi, Timini Egbuson
2023	Mercy	Tonye	Alongside Owolusi Abiodun, Charles Born, Blessing Jessica Obazi-Nze
2023	Malaika		Alongside Toyin Abraham, Odunlade Adekola, Muyiwa Ademola
2023	Blood Sisters		Alongside Chimamanda Eze, Oge Gabriel, Emeka Madu
2023	Heart Strings		Alongside Okey Jude, Jide Kosoko, Uche Montana
2024	What About Us?	Jaiye	Alongside Folu Storms, Kunle Remi
2024	On the Edge	Korede	Alongside Umaru Abudulai, Funso Adeolu, Temitope Aje
2024	The Chef	Kwame	Alongside Okoli Mather Chinonye, Angela Eguavoen
2024	Wedding Night Blues	Nosa Ezekiel	Alongside Tochi Akparanta, Chijindu Aniakor
2024	House Arrest	Chudi	Alongside Bimbo Ademoye, Adebolu Ola Ezikpe
2024	Oma's Truth	Nduka	Alongside Moet Abebe, Sunday Atate, Micah Great
2024	On the Edge	Korede	Alongside Umaru Abdulai, Funso Adeolu
2024	Just the Two of us		Alongside Uche Montana, Directed by Best Okoduwa
2024	Momiwa	Naeto	Alongside Blessing Jessica Obasi-Nze and Iyabo Ojo, Produced and Directed by Biodun Stephen
2025	Love in Every Word	Obiora	Alongside Bam Bam (Bamike), Produced by Omoni Oboli
2025	Colors of Fire	Akinbode	Alogside Osas Ighodaro, Directed by Niyi Akinmolayan

==== TV shows ====
Year	Title	Role	Notes
2019	Oga! Pastor	Deoye Gesinde	Webseries by Ndani TV
2019-2020	Unbroken	Nafike Malafa	TV series
2021	Tough Love		TV series
2025	The Party		TV series

== Awards and nominations ==
Year	Award	Category	Nominee	Result	Ref
2020	African Magic Viewers' Choice Award	Best Actor in a Comedy or Movie	Uzor Arukwe - Smash	Nominated	
2020	African Magic Viewers' Choice Award	Best Actor in a Comedy or Movie	Uzor Arukwe - Size 12	Nominated	
2021	Best of Nollywood Awards	Best Actor	Uzor Arukwe - Yours Regardless	Nominated	
2025	Africa Magic Viewer's Choice Award	Best Supporting Actor	Uzor Arukwe - Suspicion	Nominated	
2026	Africa Magic Viewers' Choice Awards	Best Actor	Colors of Fire	Won	
2026	Africa Magic Viewers' Choice Awards	Best Supporting Actor	Behind The Scenes	Nominated	
