= The Washerman =

2018 Nigerian film

- Directed by: Charles Uwagbai
- Produced by: Etinosa Idemudia
- Starring: Ik Ogbonna, Frank Donga, Mc Abbey, Bryan Okwara, Mofe Duncan, Judith Audu, Sound Sultan, Sexy Steel and Mercy Isoyip.
- Release date: 2018
- Country: Nigeria
- Language: English

The Washerman is a 2018 Nigerian romantic comedy film produced by Etinosa Idemudia and directed by Charles Uwagbai. It stars Ik Ogbonna, Frank Donga, Mc Abbey, Bryan Okwara, Mofe Duncan, Judith Audu, Sound Sultan, Sexy Steel and Mercy Isoyip.

== Synopsis ==
The story revolves around a vlogger who is desperately in search of true love. With his prayers, he overcomes disappointments and finds love, though it is not what was expected.

== Cast ==
- Judith Audu as Juliana
- Stephen Damian as Gambo
- Sani Danja as himself
- Frank Donga as Baba Landlord
- Etinosa Idemudia as KC
- Mercy Isoyip as Mimi
- Jaywon as Abbey
- IK Ogbonna as Boniface
- Chris Okagbue as Duke
- Bryan Okwara as Ric
- Genny Uzoma as Akweke
