= Devil in Agbada =

2021 Nigerian action drama film by Umanu Elijah

- Directed by: Umanu Elijah
- Written by: Chinneylove Eze
- Produced by: Chinneylove Eze
- Starring: Erica Nlewedim; Linda Osifo; Efe Irele; Uzor Arukwe; Akin Lewis; Uche Jombo; Alexx Ekubo; Nosa Rex; Etinosa Idemudia; Desmond Elliot; Henrietta Ibekwe; Selassie Ibrahim; Eleazu Texas; Alexander Okeke; Soso Soberekan
- Production company: Chinneylove Eze Productions
- Distributed by: FilmOne Entertainment; Filmhouse Cinemas
- Release date: 27 June 2021
- Running time: 115 minutes
- Country: Nigeria
- Language: English

Devil in Agbada is a 2021 Nigerian action drama film written and produced by Chinneylove Eze and directed by Umanu Elijah. The film stars Erica Nlewedim, Linda Osifo, and Efe Irele. The official poster of the film was unveiled in March 2021. The film had its special premiere on 27 June 2021 and had its official theatrical release on 2 July 2021 and opened to mixed reviews from critics but emerged as a success at the box office. The film is loosely inspired by the elements of Hollywood.

== Cast ==
- Linda Osifo as Irene
- Efe Irele as Okikiola
- Erica Nlewedim as Tomi
- Uzor Arukwe as Machado
- Akin Lewis as Otunba Lawan Shonibare
- Uche Jombo as Lady Gold
- Alexx Ekubo as Chinedu Cream
- Nosa Rex as Fred
- Etinosa Idemudia as Sisi Pepeyo
- Desmond Elliot as Mr. Rasaki
- Henrietta Ibekwe as Mrs. Justice Obanor
- Selassie Ibrahim as Tomi's Mom
- Eleazu Texas as Koboka
- Alexander Okeke as Ajagun
- Soso Soberekan
- Sunny Baba as Barrister Wale
- Oyindamola Dada-Henry as Control Room Operator
- Emeka Duru as Head Servant
- Umanu Elijah as Foreman
- Henry Emeka as Charles
- Ochuma Endurance as Press
- Chinneylove Eze as Press
- Kayode Freeman as Justice Obanor
- Tietie Jesunuihe Increase as M.C.
- Abel Jacobs as Gateman
- Princess Monday as Silhouette Girl
- Erica Nlewedim as Tomi
- Mr. Nollywood as Quenchy's Driver

Shina Ogunjumelo as Baba Alawo

- Chuka Okafor as Press
- Alexander Okeke as Ajagun
- Solomon Ozuborgo as Broda Luku
- Nosa Rex as Fred
- Soso Soberekon
- Eleazu Texas as Koboko

== Plot ==
Three young women, Irene, Okikiola, and Tomi, collaborate and team up to achieve the mission of bringing down Otunda Shonibare a ruthless politician. The mission involves infiltrating his heavily guarded and impenetrable mansion.

== See also ==
- List of Nigerian films of 2021
