= Etinosa Idemudia =

Nigerian actress

- Born: Etinosa Idemudia; Benin, Edo State, Nigeria
- Citizenship: Nigerian
- Education: Computer Engineering
- Alma mater: Covenant University
- Occupations: Actress, producer, engineer, content provider
- Years active: 2016 – present
- Parents: Sylvester Idemudia (father); Patricia Idemudia (mother)

Etinosa Idemudia is a Nigerian actress, social media influencer and filmmaker. She is best known for her role as Akugbe in the ROK original series Blood of Enogie, for which she won the award for Best Actress in a TV Series, at the Hollywood and African Prestigious Awards. She is also known for her online comedy skits on instagram, featuring various Nollywood actors including Daniel K Daniel, as well as for her breakout role as Amanda in the sitcom Chairman and her first feature film production The Washerman.

== Early life ==
Idemudia was born in Warri, Delta State, to Sylvester Idemudia, a retired group general manager of Greenfield Refineries (NNPC Group) and Patricia Idemudia, a reverend and founder of Victory Group of Schools. Idemudia began her primary education at Victory International School, Warri and had her secondary education at Cambridge International School, Warri and Igbinedion Education Centre, Benin, Edo State.

In 2011, she obtained a bachelor's degree in computer engineering from Covenant University After her graduation from University, Idemudia began working as a planning engineer with Delattre Bezons Nigeria, a subsidiary of Entrepose Contracting. She worked as a planning engineer for oil and gas construction projects until 2016 when she went into acting full-time. Idemudia then went to Royal Arts Academy owned by famous filmmaker Emem Isong where she obtained a diploma in performing arts in 2016.

Within a short time, she featured in several films and TV productions, including Made for More, The Miracle Centre, Wrongfully hers, Devil in Agbada, Blindspot, Stacy, The Call and The Millions.

== Career ==
In 2013, upon discovering Instagram videos, Idemudia began producing comedy skits, which she shared on the social media platform. The skits enjoyed rave reviews, bringing her relative success in the Nigerian entertainment industry, which culminated in her winning the award for Best Online Comic Act at the 2016 Scream Awards.

In 2016, Idemudia enrolled at the Royal Arts Academy, Lagos, Nigeria, where she obtained a diploma in performing arts, after which she quit her engineering job to pursue a full-time career in entertainment.

Her first film role was cameo appearance in A Little White Lie produced by Emem-Isong. Since then, she has appeared in films and television series including Devil in Agbada, Blood of Enogie, The Call, Chairman, Corpershun and Love in the Wrong Places. In 2017, she won the award for Best Actress at the 48 Hours Film Project for her performance in the short film Scheme

In 2018, she produced her first feature film, The Washerman, in which she appeared alongside Sound Sultan, Ik Ogbonna, Mofe Duncan, Chris Okagbue, Jaywon, Sani Danja, Bryan Okwara, Frank Donga, Judith Audu, Sexy Steel, Stephen Damian, and Mercy Isoyip.

In 2021, she won the award for Best Actress in a TV Series (Africa) at the Hollywood and African Prestigious Awards in California, United States.

=== Content creation ===
As a content provider, Idemudia has provided content for MTN on their MTN Comedy Plus platform, she also serves as a brand ambassador for MUVng, a vehicle for hire company based in Benin, Edo State, Nigeria.

In April 2020, during the COVID-19 pandemic lockdown in Nigeria, Idemudia began hosting a weekly online talent competition on her social media platforms for aspiring actors.

== Personal life ==
In December 2020, Idemudia had her first child with her partner. In September 2021, her father died after an illness. She posted a tribute to him on social media. In 2022, she criticised Leo DaSilva for giving relationship advice.

== Awards and recognition ==
Year	Event	Prize	Recipient	Result
2016	Scream Awards	Best Online Comic Act	Etinosa Idemudia	Won
2016	48 Hours Film Project	Best Actress	Etinosa Idemudia	Won
2021	Hollywood and African Prestigious Awards	Best Actress in a TV Series (Africa)	Etinosa Idemudia	Won

== Filmography ==
Year	Title	Role	Director	Notes
2015	Losing Control	Marita	Ikechukwu Onyeka	TV series featuring Joseph Benjamin
2016	A little White Lie	Anne	John Njamah	Produced by Emem Isong
2016	Ajuwaya	Emem	Tolu Tanner	Feature film produced by Lord Tanner & company
2016	Alter Ego		Moses Inwang	Feature film produced by Esther Eyibio
2016	Adventures of Etinosa		Daniel David	Web series, aired on Pulse TV Network
2016	Losing Control	Marita	Ikechukwu Onyeka	TV drama on Royal Arts Network
2017	Stormy Hearts	Preye	Tope Alake	Feature film produced by Judith Audu
2017	Mentally		James Abinibi	Feature film
2017	Wife Material	Rita	Chris Eneaji Eneng	Drama
2017	Corpershun		Tunde Olaoye	Series produced by Accelerate TV Network
2018	Chairman		Imoh Umoren	TV series produced by Bola Ola Media
2018	Sunshine	Efe	Sobe Charles Umeh	Drama
2018	The Washerman	KC	Charles Uwagbai	Feature film produced by Etinosa Idemudia
2019	The Call	Nyore	James Abinibi	Film produced by Woli Arole
2019	Gold Statue	Preke	Tade Ogidan	Film produced by Tade Ogidan
2019	City of Bastards			
2020	The Miracle Centre	Lucy	Niyi Towolawi	Film produced by Kherut films
2021	Charlie Charlie	Osas	Charles Uwagbai	Film produced by Creative Unit Studios
2021	Devil in Agbada	Sisi Pepeyo	Umanu Elijah	Film also features Desmond Elliot, Akin Lewis and Erica Nlewedim
2021	Blood of Enogie	Akugbe	Charles Uwagbai	ROK original TV series
2021	Progressive Tailors club	Obiageli	Biodun Stephens	Produced by Anthill studios
2022	The Wildflower	Mummy Osapolo	Biodun Stephen	Film written by Niyi Akinmolayan
2022	Celebrity Crash	Ama	Charles Uwagbai	ROK Studios original production
2022	Tiger's Tail	Poison	Victoria Okpala	Thriller
2022	Love and Family	Millicent	Collins Aharanwa	ROK Studios original production
2023	Osato	Enuwa	Charles Uwagbai	Drama
2023	Househelp Again	Itohan	Kingsley Iweru	Comedy
2023	Boss Chic	Evelyn	Chinneylove Eze	Romance, comedy
2023	Unusual Arrangement	Lizzy	Uche Alexmoore	Comedy
2023	Cashing Fellings	Esohe	Uche Alexmoore	Comedy, drama
2023	Hotel Labamba	Carol	Biodun Stephen	Comedy, Crime
2024	Crushed	Grace	Charles Uwagbai	Drama
2024	Whispers of Love	Alora	Uche Alexmoore	Drama
2024	Greener Pastures	Izzi	Modupe Fakorede	Drama

== See also ==
- List of Nigerian actors
- List of Nigerian film producers
