= Angela Okorie =

Nigerian actress

- Angela Okorie
- Born: Angela Ijeoma Okorie; 17 August 1975 (age 51); Cotonou, Benin
- Education: University of Lagos; Lagos State University
- Occupation: Actress
- Years active: 2009–present
- Spouse: Nwele Michael Chukwudi
- Children: 1

Angela Okorie // (born 17 August 1985) is a Nigerian actress. In 2015, she won Best Supporting Actress at the City People Entertainment Awards. Okorie is also noted to have acted in more than 100 films between 2009 and 2014.

== Early life and education ==
Okorie, the third of five children, was born and raised in Cotonou, Benin Republic. She studied theatre arts at the University of Lagos and public administration at Lagos State University. Okorie is native to the Ishiagu town in Ivo, Ebonyi.

== Career ==
Okorie ventured into Nollywood in 2009, after a decade of modeling for a soap company. Her first movie was Sincerity in 2009. The film was produced and directed by Stanley Egbonini and Ifeanyi Ogbonna respectively and stars Chigozie Atuanya, Nonso Diobi, Yemi Blaq, and Oge Okoye. According to Pulse Nigeria, her break into the limelight came after she starred in Holy Serpent. She has also stated her desire to record gospel music in the future. In 2014, she was described as one of the "most sought after actresses" in Nollywood by Vanguard newspaper, as well as a "popular actress" that interprets roles with ease by The Nation newspaper. She also stated that she intends to go into film production. Speaking on her musical aspirations, she explained that she has written numerous songs and would release her album soon, describing music as something that has always been a part of her. In January 2014, she was documented to have acted in more than 80 film productions. In 2015, she won the City People Entertainment Awards for Best Supporting Actress in an English film. In August 2014, she acted in more than 100 films since 2009. In a 2014 interview, she explained that her mother was not comfortable with her acting on religious grounds. She also stated that she wouldn't act nude irrespective of the fee, explaining that even her role models in the Nigerian industry, like Genevieve Nnaji, didn't need to go unclad to become a star. She also cited her cultural beliefs as reasons for dressing conservatively in films.

== Personal life and views on lesbianism ==
She is married with a son. In a publication by the Dailypost newspaper, she explained that she usually makes a conscious effort to separate her family from the media. She also debunked rumors of a breakup. Speaking on lesbianism in Nigeria, she explained that she is against it, particularly because "Our culture forbids it. It is a sin, and it is uncalled for. Why would a woman be romantically involved with another woman?". In a 2015 post, she downplayed the role of social media by men in relationships. Following the invitation of Nigerian pastor Johnson Suleman by the DSS, Okorie urged all Christians to support the clergyman because his views represented that of most of them.

On 25 July 2020 Angela Okorie remarried, and got engaged to her secret lover, Nwele Michael Chukwudi a.k.a. Chuchu. A fellow actress, Chita Agwu Johnson, shared photos from the marriage proposal online. They had a beach wedding on 30 July 2020. A few days later, Angela reacted to the news, and said it was a music video for her new song titled "Baby Chuchu". She mocked the news media for falling for her music strategy.

== Filmography ==
- Fubara's Wish (2020) as Regina
- Divorce Not Allowed (2018) as Ego
- Brother Jekwu (2016) as Kego
- Agaracha the Lioness (2016) as Ngeri
- Yankee Students (2015) as Itohan
- Avoidable Blunder (2015) as Louisa
- The Baby (2014) as Kate
- Hooked (2014) as Rose
- Tears in My Heart (2013) as Anny
- Parent's Guard (2012)
- Holy Serpent (with Kenneth Okonkwo) (2011)
- The Code (2011) as Cyndi
- Gallant Babes(2011)
- Thanks For Coming(2011)
- Sincerity (2009) as Becky
- Heart of a Widow
- Royal Vampire
- Palace of Vampire

== See also ==
- List of people from Ebonyi State
