= Lagos Real Fake Life =

2018 comedy film produced and directed by Mike Ezuruonye

- Directed by: Mike Ezuruonye
- Produced by: Mike Ezuruonye
- Starring: Nedu Wazobia; Mercy Aigbe; Nonso Diobi; IK Ogbonna; Annie Idibia; MC Lively; Efe Irele; Odunlade Adekola; Hailliote Sumney; Hadiza Gabon; Uzee Usman; Emmanuella; Mark Angel
- Release date: 16 February 2018
- Running time: 118 minutes
- Country: Nigeria
- Language: English
- Budget: ~ N30,000,000.00

Lagos Real Fake Life is a 2018 Nigerian comedy film written by Mike Ezuruonye and Kehinde Olorunyomi and directed by Mike Ezuruonye. The film stars Nollywood actors and actresses such as Nedu Wazobia, Mercy Aigbe, Nonso Diobi, Annie Idibia, IK Ogbonna, MC Lively, Efe Irele including Canadian-born Ghanaian actress Hailliote Sumney. The film portrays the artificial lifestyles lived by certain individuals who visit or reside in Lagos, mostly youths.

== Production ==
The film was produced by Swift Angel Production, and its total production budget was put at over 30 million naira.

== Plot ==
The film is based on true-life scenarios, showing both true and fake lifestyles lived by some residents and visitors to the city of Lagos, Nigeria.

== Cast ==
- Nedu Wazobia
- Mercy Aigbe as Jasmine
- Nonso Diobi as Emeka
- Annie Idibia
- IK Ogbonna as Dele
- MC Lively as Lively
- Efe Irele as Ify
- Mike Ezuruonye as Chidi
- Nosa Rex as Obi
- Uzee Usman as Amina's brother
- Odunlade Adekola as Landlord
- Mr. Jollof
- Josh2Funny as Okirika cloth seller
- Hailliote Sumney as Mirabel
- Hadiza Gabon as Amina
- Nikky Ufondu as Iheomah
- Emmanuella Samuel as Emmanuella
- Mong Kalu as Ntugwube
- Peggy Henshaw

== Reception ==
The film was listed by The Cable as one of the top 10 movies for viewership over the weekend. Some critics view the movie as being poorly acted and produced; others, however, praised it for showcasing diversity and conveying comic relief. By November 2019, the movie had already made it to Netflix.

== Release ==
Its director, Mike Ezuruonye, announced that the film would be released on February 16, 2018 to all cinemas in Nigeria. The movie was premiered at Palm Mall, Lekki, Lagos on November 16, 2018.
