= Hire a Woman =

2019 Nollywood film

- Movie poster
- Directed by: Ifeanyi Ikpoaneyi
- Screenplay by: Writers Ink
- Produced by: Chinneylove Eze
- Starring: Uzor Arukwe; Nancy Isime; Alexx Ekubo
- Distributed by: FilmOne Distribution
- Release date: 29 March 2019
- Running time: 109 minutes
- Country: Nigeria
- Language: English
- Box office: ₦20.8 million

Hire a Woman is a 2019 Nigerian romantic comedy film produced by Chinneylove Eze and directed by Ifeanyi Ikpoenyi, and starring Uzor Arukwe, Nancy Isime, and Alexx Ekubo. It was a box office success, the highest grossing Nigerian film in March 2019.

== Plot summary ==
Jide is invited to a reunion with his friends from university. To make his ex-girlfriend jealous and with the connivance of other female friends, he hires his best friend, Teni, to pose as his girlfriend. The ruse backfires and leads to them falling in love.

== Cast ==
- Uzor Arukwe as Jide
- Nancy Isime as Teni
- Belinda Effah as Zainab
- Alexx Ekubo as Emeka
- Ifu Enadda as Jane
- Mike Godson as Nat
- Erica Nlewedim as Nifemi
- Uche Nwaefuna as Toyosi
- Taiwo Hassan as Resort Bar Attendant
- Bamike Olawunmi as Toyosi

== Production ==
Hire a Woman followed 2017's Hire a Man, also produced by Eze and also starring Isime; Eze said that it was not a sequel, but centred around friendship, whereas the earlier film centred around family. Shooting took place at Whispering Palms Resort in Badagry.

== Reception ==
Released nationwide on 29 March 2019, the film was a box office success, grossing ₦20.8 million and achieving the month's highest box-office take among Nigerian films and third highest of all films in Nigerian theatres.
