= 2021 Best of Nollywood Awards =

Award ceremony

- Date: 11 December 2021
- Country: Nigeria

The 2021 Best of Nollywood Awards is the 13th edition of the ceremony that took place in Lokoja, Kogi State on 11 December 2021

The nominee list was revealed on 10 September 2021 by the founder of Best of Nollywood Awards at an event in Raddison Blu hotel in Ikeja, Lagos. The nominees unveiled included Stan Nze, Femi Adebayo, Lateef Adedimeji, Sola Sobowale, Mercy Aigbe, Iyabo Ojo and others. Pere Egbi, a Big Brother Naija Shine Ya Eye housemate was nominated in the Best Actor in a Leading Role category for his role in Butterflies by Biodun Stephen alongside Stan Nze, Blossom Chukwujekwu, Enyinna Nwigwe, Okey Uzoeshi and Uzor Arukwe. The Milkmaid and Rattlesnake: The Ahanna Story earned the highest nominations with 14 nominations each.

Rattlesnake: The Ahanna Story won the awards in Best Actor in a leading role, Best Actor in a Supporting role, Best Editing and Best Cinematography while The Milkmaid won Movie of the Year, Most Promising Actress and Director of the Year. A special recognition award was presented to veteran actress, Madam Kofo.

== Awards ==
Best Actor in a Lead role – English	Best Actor in a Lead role –Yoruba
Stan Eze – Rattlesnake; Blossom Chukwujekwu – Hope Spring Eternal; Enyinna Nwigwe – Badamasi; Pere Egbi – Butterflies; Okey Uzoeshi – Strain; Uzor Arukwe – Yours Regardless	Samuel Oniyitan – Abeke; Femi Adebayo – Esin; Lateef Adedimeji – Ka Bi osi; Joseph Momodu – Olufe; Seun Akindele – My Mirror; Akinola Akano – Oju
Best Actress in a Lead role –English	Best Actress in a Lead role –Yoruba
Shushu Abubakar – Strain; Sharon Nwosu – Coat of Alms; Osas Ighodaro – Rattlesnake; Sola Sobowale – Cookies Spot; Bolaji Ogunmola – Butterflies; Mary Lazarus – Homeless Home	Mercy Aigbe – Agbeke; Jumoke Odetola – My Mirror; Peju Wahab – Ijolewa; Kehinde Bankole – Abeke; Adeola Olushola – Oju; Omowunmi Dada – Alagogo Ide
Best Supporting Actor –English	Best Supporting Actress – English
Buchi Franklin – Rattlesnake; Kachi Nnochiri – Butterflies; Femi Jacobs – Eagle Wings; Martins Nebo – Just Kidding; Sani Danja – Badamasi; Seun Akindele – Greyish	Ebenezer Eno – Yours Regardless; Tolulope Oke – Cookies Spot; Blessing Obasi – Hope Springs Eternal; Juliet Njemanze – Just Kidding; Anwuli Ijenebe – Greyish; Stella Ekwueme – Unconventional
Best Actor in a Lead role –Hausa	Best Actress in a Lead role –Hausa
Gambo Usman Kona -The Milkmaid; Adam Garba – Voiceless	Anthonieta Kalunta – The Milkmaid; Asabe Madaki – Voiceless
Most Promising Actor	Most Promising Actress
Akinola Akano – Oju; Michael Ejoor – Yours Regardless	Anthonieta Kalunta – The Milkmaid; Faturoti Ifedapo – Oju; Adeola Olushola – Oju; Chinenye Aniemenam – Just Kidding
Best Supporting Actor –Yoruba	Best Supporting Actress –Yoruba
Bolanle Ninalowo – Ete; Yomi Olorunlolaye – Osuka; Rotimi Salami – Ijolewa; Wole Ojo – Abeke; Soliu Gbolagade – Abeke	Debby Shokoya – Misguided; Kemi Afolabi – Ikunsuni; Iyabo Ojo – Black Veil; Faturoti Ifedapo – Oju; Maureen Vincent – Alagogo Ide
Best Short Film	Best Child Actress
When Devil Knocks; Canoe Boy* Busted; Journey Home; Homecoming; Soja	Ewomazino Amata – Miebaka; Adaeze Onugbo – Laurie; Angel Onyi Unigwe – Strain; Nifemi Lawal – Strain; Daniel Adeshina – Ijolewa; Craig Loughlan- Miebaka
Movie with the Best Sound	Best Movie with Social message
Strain; Rattlesnake; Milkmaid; Abeke; Meibaka	Journey Home; Strain; Tethered; Time Tells; My Mirror; Ella; Hope Springs Eternal
Movie with the Best Special Effect	Movie with the Best Screenplay
Miebaka; Eagles Wings; The Milkmaid; Badamasi; Voiceless	Strain; Milkmaid; Hope Spring Eternal; Rattlesnake; Eagles Wings; Butterflies
Best Use of Food in a Movie	Movie with the Best Editing
Cookies Spot; Strain; Rattlesnake; Yours Regardless; Logan	The Milkmaid; Strain; Coat of Alms; Rattlesnake; Voiceless; Eagle Wings
Movie with the Best Cinematography	Best Use of Costume in a Movie
The Milkmaid; Strain; Voiceless; Rattlesnake; Badamasi; Eagle Wings	The Milkmaid; Butterflies; Rattlesnake; Oba Bi Olorun; Agbeke
Best Use of Make up in a Movie	Movie of the Year
Soja; Milkmaid; Olugbeja Oloun; Voiceless; Meibaka; Eye of Deity (Oju)	The Milkmaid; Voiceless; Rattlesnake; Strain; Eagle Wings
Director of the Year	Best Kiss in a Movie
Desmond Obviagele – The Milkmaid; Uduak-Obong Patrick – Strain; Ramsey Nouah – Rattlesnake; Robert Peters – Voiceless; Paul Apel Papel - Eagle Wings	Bolaji Ogunmola/Pere Egbi – Butterflies; Blossom Chukwujekwu/Bolaji Ogunmola – Hope Spring Eternal; Stan Nze/Osas Ighodaro – Rattlesnake; Frederick Leonard/Bayray Mcwinzu – Greyish
Revelation of the Year –male	Revelation of the Year –female
Emanuel Wilson (Bigshark); Babatunde Aderinloye; Jerry Williams; Badaiki John	Stephaine Zibis; Tope Aremu; Bukky Olatunji; Bianca Ugowanne; Juliet Njamaneze
Movie with the Best Production Design	Movie with the Best Soundtrack
Milkmaid; Miebaka; Badamasi; Voiceless; Rattlesnake; Eagle Wings	Oye (Knowledge); Milkmaid; Rattlesnake; Alagogo Ide; Logan; Voiceless
