= Muhammad Haroon =

Muhammad Haroon may refer to:

- Mohammad Haroon (cricketer) (born 1968), Pakistani cricketer
- Mohammad Haroon, Pakistani Navy admiral
- Mohammed Haroon, Ghanaian politician and teacher
