= Brother Jekwu =

2019 Nigerian film

- Directed by: Charles Uwagbai
- Written by: Mike Ezuruonye
- Produced by: Mike Ezuruonye
- Starring: Mike Ezuruonye; Funny Bone; Wofai Fada; Derrick Aduwo
- Cinematography: Emeka Madu
- Edited by: Jude Legema
- Music by: Habib Adebayo
- Production company: Swift Angel Productions
- Distributed by: Netflix
- Release date: 2016
- Running time: 103 minutes
- Country: Nigeria
- Language: English

Brother Jekwu is a 2016 Nigerian comedy thriller film directed by Charles Uwagbai, written and produced by Mike Ezuruonye. It was released across Cinemas in 2016.

== Plot ==
Chasing wild success, a village hustler follows his cousin from Nigeria to Kenya and stumbles into the shady business affairs of a notorious overlord.

== Cast ==
- Derrick Aduwo as Giant Asylum Patient
- Kevin Airende as Boss Lady Guy
- Eunice Anyonje Amatika as Boss Lady Maid
- Funny Bone as Paulo
- Klint da Drunk as Ndubisi
- Mike Ezuruonye as Brother Jekwu
- Wofai Fada as Taxi Driver
- Enado Odigie as Mrs Avworo
- Wofai Fada as Aunty Rosanna
- Faith Genga as P.A. to Boss Lady
- Catherine Kamau as Lauren
- Chris Kamau as Craig
- Maranga Karinga as Police
- Ella Wanjiru Mberia as Claudia
- Naomi Mburu as House Maid
- Huddah Monroe as Huddah
