= Selassie Ibrahim =

Ghanaian actress and entrepreneur

- Born: Selassie; Ghana
- Occupations: Film and television actress
- Known for: Her Mother’s Man; 40 looks Good on You; My sweetie; Baby Palaver; Her Mother's Man; 40 Looks Good On You; I Hate You Too
- Spouse: Ibrahim Adam
- Children: 2

Selassie Ibrahim is a Ghanaian actress, film producer, mother, philanthropist, entrepreneur and the CEO of Smarttys Management and production. Selassie Ibrahim has starred in movies like "Her Mother’s Man" which was directed by Desmond Elliott for IROKOtv. She has also featured in movies like Without Bounds, love shenanigans, Graduation, City crime, I hate you too, Meet the Jacobs, 40 looks good on you.

She has also featured alongside Freddie Leonard, Uche Jombo, John Dumelo, Shafy Bello and Roselyn Ngissah in her movie "40 looks Good on You". She has featured in over 50 Ghanaian movies. Selassie Ibrahim is the executive director of Jabneel Impact, a non-governmental developmental organization (NGO) which works with the aim of bringing sustainable livelihood to a defined segment of the vulnerable in our society with an objective of enhancing their capacity for effective social functioning through carefully crafted strategies. Selassie is the CEO of Smarttys Management and Productions, a business entity that specializes in adverts, documentaries, movie production, magazines, public relations and consultancy services. She also has a movie called C.E.O.

== Career ==
Selassie Ibrahim made her screen debut in the 90s, the movie "My sweetie", which gave her a breakthrough by starring alongside Grace Omaboe and Mc- Jordan Amatefio.In 2001 she produced her first Movie with Zack Orji which was later followed with the CEO in 2009. In 2011 she also did a production which featured Nadia Buari, James Gardner, Desmond Elliot, Roselyn Ngissah. In 2017 she produced a Television series which was directed by Desmond Elliott dubbed Entrapped and it was shown on African Magic showcase, EbonyLifeTV and TV3 Network in Ghana . She has also starred in various productions that was produced in Nigeria for IROKOtv. Notable amongst them are Baby Palaver, and Her Mother's Man. She was nominated as Best Actress in Supporting Role in the 2019 Golden Movie Awards.

Selassie released her new movie 40 Looks Good On You in 2019. The movie was first shown at the Silver Bird cinema and West Hill mall in Accra. The movie talks about five best friends (Yaaba, Stacy, Mawusi, Ruth and Araaba) who made a pact to succeed in life before they hit the age of 40, when they were in the university. The five friends decided to do anything possible to make it happen even if they had to live a lie. They all laid down a plan for their relationships, career, and lives. However, they were in for a surprise as life threw each of them a curveball. In the end, they figured it all out. The movie was premiered on 21 June 2019 and was directed by Pascal Amanfo.

== Personal life ==
Selassie Ibrahim is married to Ibrahim Adam, a former minister of the National Democratic Congress, and they have a son and daughter together.

== Selected filmography ==
- 40 Looks Good On You (2019)
- Sweet Melony (2020)
- Devil in Agbada (2021)
- Famous (2021)
- I Hate You Too (2021)
- Nobody's Ex (2021)
- Stale (2022)
- Woe to Men (2022)
- SEVSU: Sexual Victims Support Unit (2022)
- The Billionaire's Wife (2023)
- Bake Me a Heart (2024)
