= Soft Work =

2020 Nigerian action heist film

- Directed by: Darasen Richards
- Written by: Michael Osuji
- Produced by: Darasen Richards
- Starring: Alexx Ekubo; Frank Donga; Akin Lewis; Shafy Bello; Sanni Mu’azu; IK Ogbonna
- Release date: 27 March 2020; (Nigeria)
- Running time: 100 minutes
- Country: Nigeria
- Language: English
- Box office: $100,000 (estd.)

Soft Work, is a 2020 Nigerian action heist film directed and produced by Darasen Richards. The film stars Alexx Ekubo and Frank Donga in the lead roles whereas Akin Lewis, Shafy Bello, Sanni Mu’azu and IK Ogbonna made supportive roles. The film revolves around Chief Ademuyiwa, an accomplished businessman with over eighteen companies, whose success is attributed to a code, but centered on a heist targeted at him by Dare Olusegun, an attractive conman.

The film made its premiere on 27 March 2020 in Lagos. The film received mixed reviews from critics.

== Cast ==
- Alexx Ekubo as Dare Olusegun
- Frank Donga as Rico
- Akin Lewis as Chief Ademuyiwa
- Shafy Bello as Mrs. Ademuyiwa
- Sanni Mu’azu as Alhaji Yahaya
- IK Ogbonna as Dr. J.
- Adebayo Davies as Mr. Kayode
- Mofe Duncan as Max
- Gregory Ojefua as Nonso
- Haillie Sumney as Nonye
- Prosper Nwachukwu as Eze
- Grace Johnson as Rose
- Rolake Faluyi as Maid
- Omorinola Mark as Secretary
