= Disguise (film) =

2018 Nigerian comedy film

- Directed by: Desmond Elliot
- Written by: Patrick Nnamani
- Produced by: Naziru Danhajiya
- Starring: IK Ogbonna; Nancy Isime; Wale Ojo; Toyin Abraham
- Cinematography: Wale Adebayo
- Edited by: Emeka Ojukwu
- Music by: Timothy Tiodi Ogundele
- Production company: Inside Out Media
- Release date: 2 March 2018; (Nigeria)
- Running time: 134 minutes
- Country: Nigeria
- Language: English

Disguise, is a 2018 Nigerian comedy film directed by Desmond Elliot and coproduced by Agatha Amata and Victor Okpala. The film stars IK Ogbonna and Nancy Isime in the lead roles whereas Wale Ojo, Toyin Abraham, Daniel K Daniel and Desmond Elliot made supportive roles. The film revolves around Lambo and Nengi, a couple of friends who decide to disguise themselves as different genders to find the truth worth N10 million.

The film received mixed reviews from critics and screened worldwide.

== Cast ==
- IK Ogbonna as Belinda / Lambo
- Nancy Isime as Nengi / Melvin
- Wale Ojo as Theophilus Vaughn
- Toyin Abraham as Gigi
- Daniel K Daniel as Romulus
- Desmond Elliot as George
- Stephen Damian as Russell
- Afanye Daniel as Jude
- Emem Iniobong as Rachael
- Tomi Makanjuola as Selena
- Chy Nwakanma as Kate
- Chioma Nwosu as Shelly
- David Grey Obiala as Grey
- Helen Enado Odigie as Gina
- Nneka Ofulue as Romulus' Secretary
- Victor Okpala as Pastor
- Bright Nwachineke as Theophilus' Security Man
- Rosalyn Sheri as Rosalyn
- Faith Adibe as Student
- Moses Aleka as Guy 1
- Justin Ben as Guy 2
- Nwokolo Chinaza as Terrified Girl
- Eze Chinonso as Student
- Oribhabor Dickson as Grey Boy
- Ibeyh Edith as Student
- Badejoko Busayo as Student
- Uchechi Ejiogu as Gigi's Secretary
- Osunde Loveth as Student
- Ngozi Onuoha as Classmate 2
- Guddy Udeozor as Classmate 1
- Olasimbo Yetunde as Sexy Girl
- Lamboginny as guest Artist
