= Divorce Not Allowed =

- Directed by: Mike Ezuruonye
- Produced by: Mike Ezuruonye
- Starring: Bolanle Ninalowo, Iyabo Ojo, Angela Okorie, Eniola Badmus
- Release date: 2018
- Country: Nigeria
- Language: English

Divorce Not Allowed is a 2018 Nigerian romantic comedy produced and directed by Mike Ezuruonye. The movie, which addresses relationship issues between couples and lovers, stars Bolanle Ninalowo, Iyabo Ojo, Angela Okorie, Eniola Badmus and Mike Ezuruonye.

== Synopsis ==
The film revolves around the problems faced by young couples and how their solutions sometimes lead to separation. The movie narrates the scenes through three young married men that experience problems in their marriages that make them wish they never married. They are not bold enough to separate, but rather deploy other means that can liberate them from the bondages.

== Premiere ==
The movie was first premiered in Nigeria and was later premiered in Boleyn Cinemas, Barking Road, London, UK on 23 June 2018.

== Cast ==
- Mike Ezuruonye as Hycent
- Rotimi Salami as Joe
- Kehinde Olorunyomi as Linda
- Eniola Badmus as Shrink
- Iyabo Ojo as Omotara
- Angela Okorie as Ego
- Bolanle Ninalowo as Chuks
- Efe Irele as Ovie
- Tolade Anibaba as Loveth
- Bestman Thompson as Maye
