= 40 Looks Good on You =

Ghanaian film

- Directed by: Pascal Amanfo
- Starring: Stephanie Benson; Roselyn Ngissah; Selassie Ibrahim; Uche Jumbo; Shaffy Bello; Frederick Leonard; Eddy Watson; John Dumelo
- Production company: Smarttys Productions
- Release date: 21 June 2019
- Country: Ghana
- Language: English

40 Looks Good on You is a 2019 Ghanaian film directed by Pascal Amanfo.

== Synopsis ==
Five friends Stacy, Yaaba, Mawusi, Araaba, and Ruth who met at the university, made a promise to themselves that by age forty they should have achieved everything in life, but things did not seem to go on well for them as the story begins to unfold.

== Cast ==
- Stephanie Benson
- Roselyn Ngissah
- Selassie Ibrahim
- Uche Jombo
- Shaffy Bello
- Frederick Leonard
- Eddy Watson
- John Dumelo
