= Frank Donga =

Nigerian actor and comedian

Kunle Idowu
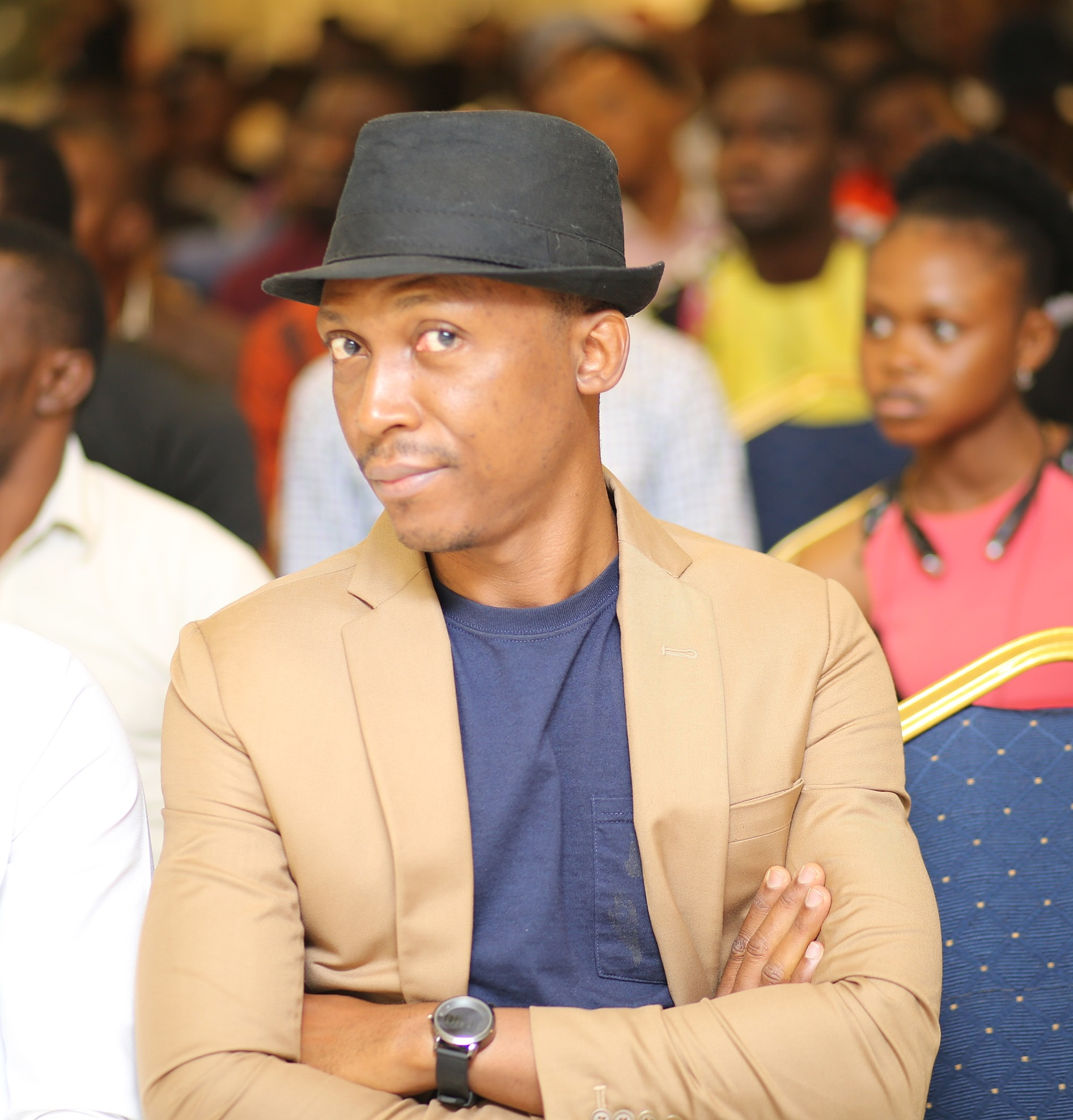
- Frank Donga at the 2018 Lagos Digital Summit
- Born: Kunle Idowu; 13 October
- Citizenship: Nigerian
- Education: Agricultural Science, Olabisi Onabanjo University
- Occupations: Actor; comedian
- Years active: 2013-present

Kunle Idowu, popularly known as Frank Donga, is a Nigerian actor and comedian. He rose to fame through the webseries, The Interview, on Ndani TV about an unassuming job-seeker for which he was nominated for Best Actor in a Comedy in the Africa Magic Viewers Choice Award in 2015. He has gone on to feature in several movies like The Wedding Party and its sequel The Wedding Party 2. Previously working as a journalist, he also works as a photographer and a filmmaker.

In 2022, he and Philomaine Nanema co-presented Hello Doc, a series intended to encourage COVID-19 immunisation in Africa.

== Education ==
Idowu attended Ogun State University (now Olabisi Onabanjo University) where he obtained a BSc in agricultural science and also the University of Ibadan, where he obtained a master's degree in animal genetics.

== Filmography ==
Film Roles
Year	Title	Role	Notes	Ref
2016	The Wedding Party	Harrison, the driver		
2017	TATU			
2017	Idahosa Trials	Pastor Osas	A movie about the life events of Bishop Benson Idahosa	
2017	Mentally	Akin		
2017	Hakkunde	Akande	Lead role Reprises his character of an unemployed graduate	
2017	The OAP	Sikiru		
2017	The Wedding Party 2	Harrison		
2018	Falz Experience: The Movie			
2018	200 Million			
2018	Seven and a Half Date	Frank		
2018	The Washerman	Baba Landlord	A movie by Etinosa Idemudia	
2018	Funke!	John		
2018	Crossroads			
2018	The Foreigner's God	Winter Kunte		
2019	Three Thieves	Rukevwe		
2019	She Is			
2020	Soft Work			
2021	Swallow			
2021	Unintentional	Hotel Porter		
2021	One Lagos Night			

Television Role
Year	Title	Role	Notes
2013-2015	The Interview	Frank Donga	Web series on Ndani TV
2016–present	The Boot	Frank Donga	With Denrele Edun on EbonyLife TV
2017	Flatmates	Dede Malik	
2017	The Condo	Jeff	

== Awards and nominations ==
=== Africa Magic Viewers' Choice Awards ===
Year	Nominee / work	Award	Result	Ref
2015	Kunle Idowu/The Interview (web series)	Best Actor in a Comedy	Nominated	
2018	Frank Donga/Idahosa Trials	Best Supporting Actor	Nominated	
2023	Kunle Idowu/Unintentional	Best Actor In A Comedy Drama, Movie Or TV Series	Nominated	

=== Africa Movie Academy Awards ===
Year	Nominee / work	Award	Result	Ref
2018	Frank Donga/Hakkunde	Best Actor in a Leading Role	Nominated	

=== The African Film Festival (TAFF) ===
Year	Nominee / work	Award	Result	Ref
2018	Frank Donga	Best Actor	Won	
