= Charlie Charlie (film) =

- Directed by: Charles Uwagbai, Monica Swaida
- Produced by: Charles Uwagbai
- Release date: 2021
- Country: Nigeria
- Language: English language

Charlie Charlie is a 2021 Nigerian film produced by Charles Uwagbai and Monica Swaida, and directed by Charles Uwagbai. It explores themes of human trafficking and money laundering. The film stars Omoni Oboli, Monica Swaida, Mary Remmy Njoku, Alexx Ekubo, Chioma Akpotha, Etinosa Idemudia, and Prince David Osei.

== Synopsis ==
The film revolves around two identical individuals; a drug cartel member and an innocent man. The innocent man is mistaken for the drug dealer and is caught in the drug operations running Nigeria through Ghana, Morocco to Europe. The mistaken identity caused the cartel to lose money which bounces back on the two.

== Cast ==
- Femi Adebayo
- Chioma Chukwuka Akpotha
- Sani Danja
- Alexx Ekubo
- Etinosa Idemudia
- Abimbola Kazeem
- Funky Mallam
- Omoni Oboli
- Prince David Osei
- Mary Remmy
- Monica Swaida
- Oluwatoyin Albert Tomama

== Production ==
The film was shot in Lagos, Ghana, and Europe.

== Release ==
The film was privately screened at the PEFTI Film Institute in Lagos State before its theatrical release on July 16, 2021.
