= Funny Bone (actor) =

Nigerian actor and comedian

- Born: Chibunna Stanley; October 28, 1985 (age 40); Kaduna state, Nigeria
- Education: University of Jos
- Occupations: Actor; Comedian
- Spouse: Angel
- Children: 1

Chibunna "Funny Bone" Stanley (born 28 October 1985) is a Nigerian actor and stand-up comedian. At a show in Anambra, he implored the then Governor, Obiano to invest in youth and he tasked the political appointees of the state to be active.

In 2020, he won the 2020 AMVCA Best Actor in a Comedy award beating other 4 contestants.

== Personal life ==
In June 2022, he married his wife traditionally in Enugu. They had their first child, Zimchikachim, in October 2023.

== Selected filmography ==
=== Films ===
- Tòkunbò (2024) as Chukwudi
- A Father's Love (2024) as Panshak
- Holy Heist (Can a Man Rob God?) (2023) as Osas
- The Bride Price (2023)
- I Do Not Come to You by Chance (2023)
- Finding Odera (2023) as Nonso
- Aki and Pawpaw (2021) as Ebuka
- Bread Life (2021)
- Dream Job (2021) as George
- Missing(2021) as Officer Isaiah
- Progressive Tailors Club (2021) as Fidelis
- Desperate Houseboys (2021) as Franklin
- Time To Be a Man (2020)
- Three Thieves (2019) as Nna Bros
- Smash (2018)
- Bandits(2018) as Amala
- Talior My Heart(2018) as Osondu
- Crazy People(2018)
- Love,Sex,Religion(2018) as Izu
- Just What Happened(2018)
- The Bodyguard (2018) as Johnson
- Sergeant Tutu (2017) as Sergeant Tutu
- The Wedding Party 2: Destination Dubai (2017)
- The Friend Zone (2017) as Furo
- Scorned (2017)
- Lost In London (2017)as Bona's brother
- Dognapped (2017) as Officer Chuka
- Brother Jekwu (2016) as Paulo
- When Love Happens Again (2016) as Alhaji Emeka
- Fast Cash (2016) as Josh
- Ayaka(2016)
- Love Is In The Hair (2016)
- It's About Your Husband (2016) as Gentleman

=== Television ===
- Squatterz (2012)
- Far From Home (2022) as Coach Stanley
