= Idahosa Trails =

2017 Nollywood film

Idahosa Trials
- Directed by: Stanlee Ohikhuare
- Written by: Stanlee Ohikhuare
- Produced by: Stanlee Ohikhuare
- Starring: Charles Okafor: David Schifter; Liz Benson-Ameye; Osas Ighodaro; Adedamola Akapo; Kunle Idowu; Patrick Doyle
- Cinematography: Stanlee Ohikhuare
- Edited by: Stanlee Ohikhuare
- Music by: Jay Ezechine: Oriri Osayamore
- Production company: Mighty Jot Studios
- Release date: 27 October 2017 (Nigeria)
- Running time: 110 minutes
- Country: Nigeria
- Language: English
- Budget: $270,000

Idahosa Trails is a 2017 Nigerian drama film written, produced and directed by Stanlee Ohikhuare. It stars Charles Okafor, David Schifter, Liz Benson, Osas Ighodaro, Kunle Idowu. It is based on the experience of an American Journalist Thomas Book (portrayed by David Schifter) who seeks to interview Archbishop Benson Idahosa (portrayed by Charles Okafor) based on his perception of the role played by Idahosa in the miraculous recovery of a popular chief in Benin City, whose recovery happened spontaneously after six years in a coma. The film was released in late October 2017 by Mighty Jot Studios in Benin City, Nigeria.

== Plot ==
Thomas Book is on a journey to the ancient city of Benin, Nigeria, to shoot an investigative documentary on the secret rites performed during the coronation of a new Oba. He was unable to get enough information due to the high level of secrecy surrounding the rites. As he prepares to leave the city, he hears the story of a popular local chief who had just woken from a six-year coma, and he decides to document the story. Convinced that the story would be some sort of compensation for his failure to get information at the coronation's coverage, he decides to go to the hospital. At the hospital, a nurse offers to help with interpretation as he interviews the man. He is only able to ask one question before the members of the man's family barge in to interrupt his interview. During the short interview, Thomas was able to get a name from the man, the name Idahosa.

He arrives at his hotel room and hears the same name on a TV Broadcast for the Idahosa World Outreach. He assumes that the Idahosa must have played a crucial role in the old man's recovery. He writes down the address and phone number shown on display, and heads to the Idahosa World Outreach headquarters in Benin City. On arrival at the church, Thomas meets with a young pastor known as Pastor Osas (Kunle Idowu) who asks him to come back the following day to meet with Benson Idahosa. The young pastor gets Thomas a book to read about Idahosa. Out of excitement about the new development, Thomas reschedules his flight and starts preparing for this new story of on Idahosa.

On arrival at his hotel room, Thomas flips through the book with sleepy eyes, and he falls into a trance and finds himself in the re-enactment of the story depicted in the book. The next day, Thomas meets up with Pastor Osas and they make several unsuccessful stops at different locations where the young pastor promised Thomas they would find Idahosa and get his story. Two days go by and Thomas is unable to get to meet Idahosa but every night when he gets back to his hotel room, he continues to read the book on Idahosa. Just like the first night, he falls asleep reading the book and experiences the re-enactment of the stories depicted in the book. He relentlessly kept on following Pastor Osas with the aim of getting to interview Archbishop Idahosa.

On the day before Thomas’ scheduled departure, he is shocked to find out that Idahosa is dead. This discovery leads to an altercation between him and Pastor Osas which leads to a face off. In an unexpected turn of events, Thomas is Implicated in an accident that leaves Pastor lying unconscious on the floor. He was curious to understand Idahosa's role in the perceived miracle of the old man he had interviewed at the hospital. Pastor Osas thought Thomas knew of Idahosa's death and assumed that he just wanted to get to interview the people whose lives Idahosa's ministry affected positively. Thomas, now confused must piece the clues together as he finds strength to embark on a journey of discovery; to find truth, faith and salvation.

== Cast ==
- Charles Okafor as Benson Idahosa
- David Schifter as Thomas Book
- Liz Benson-Ameye as Sarah
- Osas Ighodaro as Osamuede
- Adedamola Akapo as young Benson Idahosa
- Kunle Idowu as Pastor Osas
- Daisy Morsi as Margaret Idahosa
- Florence Iyamu as Edede
- Ronya Mangertzman as Mrs. Thomas Book
- Patrick Doyle as John Idahosa
- Mariam Iyeh as Older Margaret
- Mike Omoregbee as Chief Osaigbovo
- Lynne Obray as Thomas Book's Mom
- David Obray as Thomas Book's Dad
- Arbel Malik as Thomas Book's Kid
- Joshua Osula as Benson's Pastor
