= Tatu (film) =

2017 Nigerian film by Don Omope

- Theatrical release poster
- Directed by: Don Omope
- Written by: Jude Idada
- Produced by: Don Omope
- Starring: Rahama Sadau; Segun Arinze; Desmond Elliott; Gabriel Afolayan; Sambasa Nzeribe; Funlola Aofiyebi-Raimi; Afeez Oyetoro; Frank Donga; Toyin Aimakhu
- Cinematography: Akpe Ododoru
- Edited by: Adekunle Bryan Oyetunde
- Distributed by: FilmOne production
- Release date: 22 July 2017 (Nigeria)
- Running time: 101 minutes
- Country: Nigeria
- Language: English

Tatu is a 2017 Nigerian adventure film directed by Don Omope. It was written by Jude Idada and is an adaptation of the 2014 novel Tatu by Abraham Nwankwo. The film tied for the most nominations at the 2018 Africa Magic Viewers' Choice Awards.

== Synopsis ==
In Tatu, we see the life of a mother and her attempt to salvage the idea of her only daughter being given away as a sacrifice for the atonement of sins.

== Cast ==
- Toyin Abraham as Larayi
- Segun Arinze as Narimana
- Gabriel Afolayan as Wally
- Desmond Elliot as Father Hano
- Rahama Sadau as Tatuma
- Sambasa Nzeribe as Kamani
- Funlola Aofiyebi-Raimi
- Hafiz ‘Saka’ Oyetoro as guard 1
- Frank Donga

== Production ==
Tatu was shot in locations across Lagos, and Abuja. It was shot in a span of 12 months.

== Release ==
Tatu was first released theatrically in July 2017 in Nigeria, and premiered at the Eko Hotel Convention Centre, Victoria Island. In 2019, the movie was added to Netflix's catalogue as the company continued to invest in the African Film industry.

== Reception ==
Tatu was mildly received by the public. For most of its viewers, the movie had potentials that were not met. On Nollywood Reinvented, the movie had a rating of 52%.

== Accolades ==
Complete list of awards
Year	Award	Category	Recipient(s)	Result	Ref.
2017	Best of Nollywood Awards	Best Actor in a Lead role –English	Gabriel Afolayan	Nominated	
2017	Best of Nollywood Awards	Best Actress in a Lead role –English	Rahama Sadau	Nominated	
2017	Best of Nollywood Awards	Best Supporting Actor –English	Segun Arinze, Sambasa Nzeribe	Nominated	
2017	Best of Nollywood Awards	Best Supporting Actress –English	Toyin Abraham, Funlola Aofiyebi-Raimi	Nominated	
2017	Best of Nollywood Awards	Most Promising Actor	Suara Olayinka	Won	
2017	Best of Nollywood Awards	Best Child Actress	Teniola Awobiyi	Won	
2017	Best of Nollywood Awards	Best Child Actor	Dumebi Nzeribe	Nominated	
2017	Best of Nollywood Awards	Movie with the Best Screenplay	Tatu	Nominated	
2017	Best of Nollywood Awards	Movie with the Best Editing	Tatu	Nominated	
2017	Best of Nollywood Awards	Movie with the Best Soundtrack	Tatu	Nominated	
2017	Best of Nollywood Awards	Movie with the Best Production Design	Tatu	Nominated	
2017	Best of Nollywood Awards	Movie with the Best Cinematography	Tatu	Nominated	
2017	Best of Nollywood Awards	Best Use of Nigerian Costume in a Movie	Tatu	Nominated	
2017	Best of Nollywood Awards	Best Use of Make up in a Movie	Tatu	Nominated	
2017	Best of Nollywood Awards	Movie of the Year	Tatu	Nominated	
2017	Best of Nollywood Awards	Director of the Year	Don Omope	Nominated	
2018	Africa Magic Viewers' Choice Awards	Best Cinematography Movies/TV Series	Tatu (Akpe Ododura)	Nominated	
2018	Africa Magic Viewers' Choice Awards	Best Sound Editor	Tatu (Kolade Morakinyo)	Won	
2018	Africa Magic Viewers' Choice Awards	Best Soundtrack Movies/TV Series	Tatu (Evelle)	Won	
2018	Africa Magic Viewers' Choice Awards	Best Supporting Actress	Toyin Aimakhu, Funfola Afofiyebi-Raimi	Nominated	
2018	Africa Magic Viewers' Choice Awards	Best Movie West Africa	Tatu	Nominated	
2018	Africa Magic Viewers' Choice Awards	Best Director	Don Omope (Tatu)	Nominated	
2018	Africa Magic Viewers' Choice Awards	Best Art Director	Don Omope, Yolanda Okereke, Segun Arinze, Tolu Awobiye (Tatu)	Nominated	
2018	Africa Magic Viewers' Choice Awards	Best Lighting Designer Movie/TV Series	Akpe Ododuru, Tunde Akinniyi (Tatu)	Won	
2018	Africa Magic Viewers' Choice Awards	Best Costume Designer Movie/TV Series	Yolanda Okereke	Nominated	
2018	Africa Magic Viewers' Choice Awards	Best Make Up Artist Movie/TV Series	Thelma Ozy Smith, Hakeem Effect Onilogbo	Won	
