= Stanlee Ohikhuare =

Nigerian filmmaker and cinematographer

- Born: Stanlee Aideloje Ohikhuare
- Citizenship: Nigerian
- Occupations: Filmmaker, Cinematographer, and Writer
- Known for: producing short films.
- Notable work: Tunnel
- Awards: 2013 Africa Magic Viewers' Choice Awards, Best Cinematographer

Stanlee Aideloje Ohikhuare known professionally as Stanlee Ohikhuare is a Nigerian filmmaker, cinematographer, and writer. He is known for producing short films. He obtained a diploma from a school of fine arts.

== Filmography ==
Year	Title	Role					Notes	Ref
Year	Title	Director	Producer	Writer	Cinematographer	Editor	Notes	Ref
2014	Tunnel	Yes					Ohikhuare's first short film	
2014	Kpians: The feast of souls							
2014	Verdict: The LaVena Johnson Murder Conspiracy							
2015	Stupid Movie	Yes					Stars Kiki Omeili	
2015	Recourse	Yes						
2015	Amiable	Yes	Yes					
2016	Iterum	Yes					Screened at the 69th annual Cannes Film Festival	
2017	Idahosa Trails	Yes	Yes	Yes	Yes	Yes	Based on the story of a Journalist meeting the Nigerian pastor, Benson Idahosa	
2017	Coat of Harms	Yes					Premiered at the 70th annual Cannes Film Festival	
2020	Lady Buckit and the Motley Mopsters			Yes			Nigeria's first feature-length animation	
	Common Man	Yes			Yes			

== Awards and nominations ==
Year	Award	Category	Work	Result	Ref
2013	Africa Magic Viewers' Choice Awards	Best New Media - Online Video	Kpians: Premonition	Nominated	
2015	Africa Magic Viewers' Choice Awards	Best Makeup		Nominated	
2015	Africa Magic Viewers' Choice Awards	Best Art Director		Nominated	
2015	Africa Magic Viewers' Choice Awards	Best Movie Director		Nominated	
2015	Africa Magic Viewers' Choice Awards	Best Cinematographer		Won	
2015	Africa Magic Viewers' Choice Awards	Best Lighting Designer		Nominated	
2015	Golden Icon Academy Awards	Best Sound	Kpians: The feast of souls	Won	
2015	Golden Icon Academy Awards	Best Editing	Kpians: The feast of souls	Nominated	
2015	Golden Icon Academy Awards	Best Editing	Verdict	Nominated	
2015	Nigerian Entertainment Awards	Best Director	Verdict	Nominated	
2015	Africa Magic Viewers' Choice Awards	Best Cinematographer	Verdict	Won	
2016	Africa Magic Viewers' Choice Awards	Best Lighting Designer	Common Man	Won	
2016	Africa Magic Viewers' Choice Awards	Best Lighting Designer	Kpians: The feast of souls	Nominated	
2016	Africa Magic Viewers' Choice Awards	Best Cinematographer	Common Man	Nominated	
2016	Africa Magic Viewers' Choice Awards	Best Movie - West Africa	Common Man	Nominated	
2016	Africa Magic Viewers' Choice Awards	Best Art Director	Common Man	Nominated	
2018	Africa Magic Viewers' Choice Awards	Best Art Director	Idahosa Trails	Nominated	
2018	Africa Magic Viewers' Choice Awards	Best Sound Editor	Idahosa Trails	Nominated	
2018	Africa Magic Viewers' Choice Awards	Best Writer Movie/TV Series	Idahosa Trails	Nominated	
