= Mentally =

2017 Nigerian film

- Directed by: James Abinibi
- Written by: James Abinibi
- Produced by: James Abinibi
- Starring: Kunle Idowu; Toyin Abraham; Woli Arole; Adekunle Gold
- Release date: 2017
- Country: Nigeria
- Language: English

Mentally is a 2017 Nigerian film written, produced and directed by James Abinibi. The movie stars Kunle Idowu, Toyin Abraham, Woli Arole and Adekunle Gold

== Synopsis ==
The movie revolves around a young man who went to Lagos, a place where he only knows one person, in search of greener pastures despite his mother's warning.

== Premiere ==
The movie was first premiered on Sunday 29 September 2017.

== Cast ==
- Toyin Abraham as Ewa
- Frank Donga as Akin
- Adekunle Gold
- Jude Chukwuka
- Steve Onu as Yaw
- Woli Arole as Self
- Kunle Idowu as Akin
- Chris Okagbue as Awe
- Sunkanmi Omobolanle
- Erick Didie
- Rotimi Salami as Udi
- Wale Waves; and
- Koloman Prosper.
