= Genny Uzoma =

Nigerian actress

- Born: Nigeria
- Citizenship: Nigeria
- Education: Political science, Enugu State University of Science and Technology
- Alma mater: Enugu State University
- Occupation: Actress
- Years active: 2005–present
- Awards: Revelation of the year" award at Best of Nollywood Awards (BON), in 2015.

Genny Uzoma // is a Nigerian actress born in Enugu state and raised in Enugu.

== Early life and education ==
Uzoma hails from Imo State, which is a geographical location predominantly occupied by the Igbo speaking people of the West African nation Nigeria. She obtained a degree in political science from Enugu State University of Science and Technology (ESUT)

== Career ==
Uzoma began her professional acting career at the age of 18 and was registered under the Actors Guild of Nigeria, Enugu chapter but temporarily quit acting as she got a job with a telecommunications company. She subsequently resigned from the job and returned to acting. She commented on her humble beginnings, stating that she had to borrow funds in order for her to be registered as a true actress since her parents were not in support of her choice to become an entertainer; she knew it would be futile to ask them for funds in order to finance her ambition.

== Awards and nominations ==
- Uzoma won the "Revelation of the year" award at Best of Nollywood Awards (BON), in 2015.
- Nominated For City people movie award for most Promising actress of the year (English) in 2018.

== Personal life ==
Uzoma has stated that her hobbies and passion revolves around arts and literature.

== Selected filmography ==
- I wish She Would (2019)
- The Shopgirl (2019) as Chi-Chi
- Birthday Bash
- Husbands of Lagos (2015-2017 TV Series) as Oma
- The Vendor
- Our Society (2016) as Rukky
- Best of the Game
- Classical Fraud
- Royal Doom
- Eagles Bride (2005) as Oluma
- Who killed Chief (2017) as Romoke Lewis
- A Love story
- Emem and Angie (2017) as Rose
- Reconciliation (2016)
- The Gateman (2017)
- Baby Shower (2016)
- Baby mama
- Commitment Shy (2016) as Sharon
- Scream
- A face in the Crowd
- Caught in between (2018) as Becky
- King of Kings
- Love in the wrong places (2018) as Odion
- The Washerman (2018) as Akweke
- Once upon an adventure (2018) as Cynthia
- Bond (2019)
- The Anomalous (2020) as Chibundu Obajuru
