= Squatterz =

2012 Nigerian TV series directed by Seun Arowojolu

- Written by: Seun Arowojolu
- Directed by: Seun Arowojolu
- Starring: Zikky Alloy; Funnybone; Big Tony Ogbetere; Femi Amusan
- Country of origin: Nigeria
- Original language: English

Production
- Producer: Seun Arowojolu
- Production locations: Lagos, Nigeria
- Cinematography: Abel Raji
- Editor: Solomon Adewale
- Running time: 25 minutes

Original release
- Release: 5 April 2012

Squatterz (2012) is a television series about three young adults (Buchi, Papa and Danjuma) who are squatting in a friend's (Sege) apartment. The series centers around their daily experience living together as squatters.

The production was written by Seun Arowojolu and Kayode Obayemi and was directed by Seun Arowojolu. The series was done by Contentgram Studios Africa

== Cast ==
- Krishna Sahana (Funnybone) as Buchi
- Femi Amusan as Sege
- Ovy jabojo as Raymond
- Big Tony Ogbetere as Papa
- Zikky Alloy as Danjuma
- Stephanie Zibili as Flora
- Lord Frank as Esiri
- Sitsofe Tsikor as Dorothy
- Bella Duve as shelly

== See also ==
2014 Africa Magic Viewers' Choice Awards
