= Mohammed Haroon =

Ghanaian politician

Hon. Mohammed Haroon

Member of Parliament for Chogu-Tishigu constituency
- In office 7 January 1993 – 6 January 1997
- President: Jerry John Rawlings
- Succeeded by: Ibrahim Adam

Personal details
- Party: National Democratic Congress
- Education: University of Cape Coast
- Occupation: Politician
- Profession: Teacher

Mohammed Haroon (also Ahaji Mohammed Haroon) is a Ghanaian politician and a teacher. He served as a member of the first parliament of the fourth republic of Ghana for Chogu-Tishigu constituency in the Northern Region of Ghana.

== Politics ==
Mohammed Haroon was elected during the 1992 Ghanaian parliamentary election on the ticket of the National Democratic Congress.

He lost the seat in 1996 Ghanaian general election to Ibrahim Adam of the National Democratic Congress who won the seat with 22,368 votes which represented 31.30% of the share by defeating Mohammed A. Sadique of Convention People's Party who obtained 20,801 of the votes cast which represented 29.10% of the share; Abubakr Al-Hassan of the National Convention Party who obtained 5,020 votes which represented 7.00%; Faiz Aouni Moutrage an Independent who obtained 1,744 votes which represented 2.40%; Iddrisu Hudu of People's National Convention who obtained 1,738 votes which represented 2.40%; Al-Hassan Wayo Seini of the New Patriotic Party who obtained 1,394 votes which represented 2.00% and Abdul-Samed Muhtar of National Convention Party who obtained 461 votes which represented 0.60%.

== Personal life ==
He is a Muslim.
