= A Man for the Weekend =

2017 Cameroonian romantic comedy file

A Man For The Weekend
- Directed by: Achille Brice
- Produced by: Syndy Emade
- Starring: Syndy Emade; Alexx Ekubo; Solange Ojong
- Release date: October 2017
- Country: Cameroon
- Language: English

A Man For The Weekend is a 2017 Cameroonian romantic comedy movie produced by Syndy Emade featuring Nollywood actor Alexx Ekubo.

== Synopsis ==
A Man For The Weekend tells us the story of Candace Ayuk, a young business executive. Driven by her career, she has no time for the pleasure of life, much to the chagrin of her mother who want to see her settle down. This drive a wedge between the two as Candy finds herself avoiding her mother's calls for obvious reasons to find a man just to please her mother. Sadly, the man she finds as the perfect one to present to her mom turns out to be a fraud.

== Cast ==
- Syndy Emade as Candy
- Alexx Ekubo as Bryan Mbah
- Nchifor Valery as Richard Mbome
- Solange Ojong as Christelle Ayuk
- Miss Lee as Mrs. Ayuk
- Roger Brice Sogbo as Mr. Ayuk
- Raquel Bessong as Young Candy
- Ngala Cynthia as Secretary
- Akila Favour as Young Christelle
- Jeanne Mbenti as Annabella
- Kingsley Nkwah as Jonas
- Anurin Nwunembom as Paul
- Becky Takang as Melissa
- Ngong Tatiana as Maid

== Release ==
A Man For The Weekend was released in October 2017.

== Reception ==
Cameroon celebrity websites consider the movie as the first international debut of Syndy Emade's own production inviting Nollywood star Alexx Ekubo.

== See also ==
- List of Cameroonian films
- Cinema of Nigeria
