= Achille Brice =

Cameroonian filmmaker (born 1984)

- Born: Assoua Achille Brice Eteki; 9 April 1984 (age 42); Buea, South Region, Cameroon
- Education: University College of Technology
- Occupations: Editor, director, producer
- Years active: 2007–present
- Awards: 2008 Verdant Hills Minifilms Festival
- Website: www.binamstudios.com

Achille Brice (born Assoua Achille Brice Eteki in 1984) is a Cameroonian filmmaker, producer and movie director. His work in Life Point was recognized among the 20 of 1,000 movies submitted to contest at l'Étalon d'or de Yennenga at the Pan African Film Festival in Ouagadougou, Burkina Faso. In 2011, he received three nominations as best filmmaker in Cameroon at the Zulu African Film Academy Awards for Obsession, the first Cameroonian English language film to be nominated in the Écrans Noirs Film Festival for Écrans D'Afrique Centrale, Prix Charles Mensa at the CRANS Noir Film Festival. He is the founder of BinAm Studios, an open forum for filmmakers to share and advertise their product.

== Early life ==
Achille was born as Assoua Achille Brice Eteki on April 9, 1984, in Buea. According to a publication on the Music in Africa website, he did his primary and secondary school in Buea and tertiary education at the University College of Technology Southwest Region (Cameroon). Before his career in film, he did music for five years as a recording and solo artist. His debut album was titled Hood Classics. He was noticed as a movie editor in 2003 in the movie Luxury. In 2007, after graduating from UCT, he was admitted to an editing and directing course with Genesis Pictures in Buea.

== Career ==
His professional career started in 2006 with two films nominated at the Verdant Hills Minifilms Festival. The Ancestry Price was selected in short films (2007/2008), A Woman's World (2008/2009) and others. In 2008, he represented Cameroon in the Durban International Film Festival in South Africa. He participated in the Berlinale talent campus as well as the Durban Talent Campus in 2009. He is the owner of BinAm Studios.

== Selected filmography ==
- Luxury (2003)
- Leader Gangsters (2005)
- The Ancestry Price (2007/2008)
- Obsession (2011)
- A Man for the Weekend (2017)
- Life Point (2017)
- Ward Zee (2018)
- Behind Gates (2022)
- Dawn: Breaking Barriers (2024)
- Two Worlds (2024)

== Awards and recognition ==
Year	Award	Category	Work	Result
2017	Pan African Film Festival in Ouagadougou	Best film	Life Point	Nominated
2008	Verdant Hills Minifilms Festival		The Ancestry Price (short film)	Won

== See also ==
- List of Cameroonian Actors
- Cinema of Cameroon
