= Philomaine Nanema =

Burkinabe comedian (born 1982)

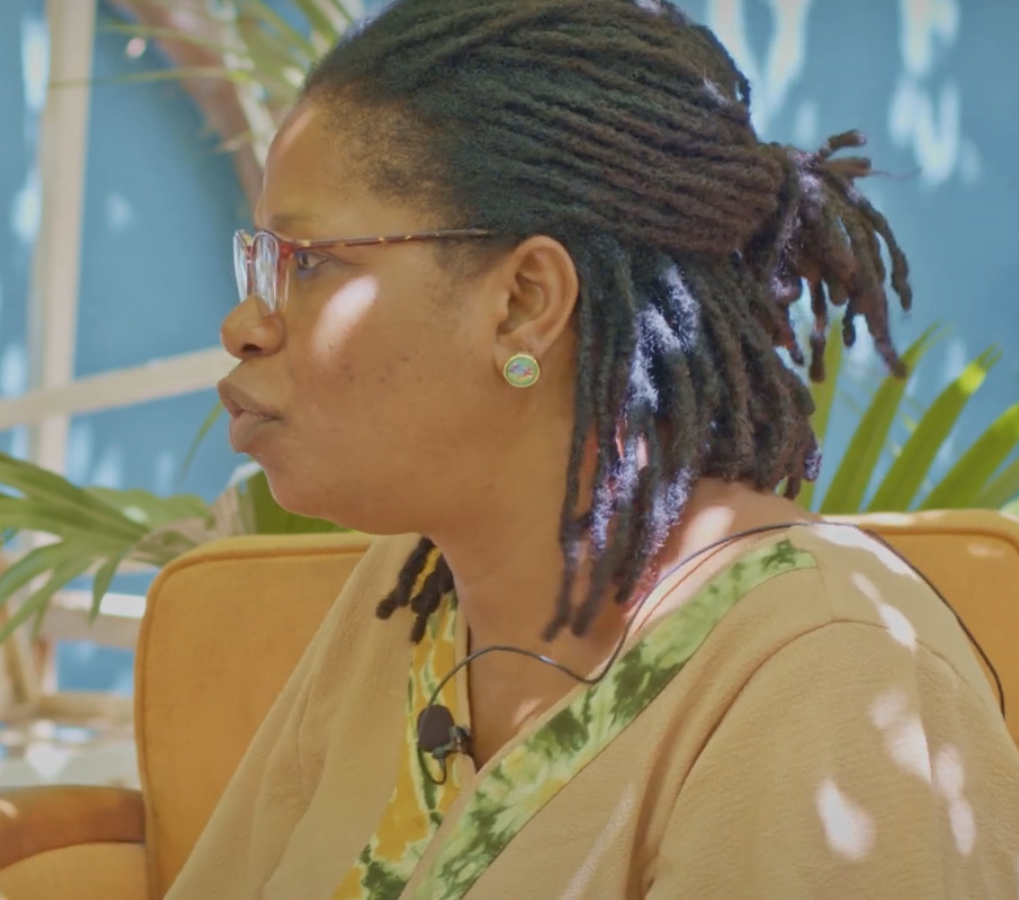
- Nanema in 2022
- Born: 10 April 1982 (age 44); Côte d'Ivoire
- Occupations: Comedian, actress
- Known for: Co-presenting Hello Doc with Frank Donga

Philomaine Nanema, also Philo (born 10 April 1982) is a Burkinabe comedian and actress. She is the recipient of the 2020 ECOWAS prize for best young comedian. In 2022, she co-presented Hello Doc, a series intended to encourage COVID-19 immunisation in Africa.

== Biography ==
Nanema was born on 10 April 1982 in Côte d'Ivoire. Her career initially began as a radio host. In 2006, Nanema made her theatrical debut in Ouagadougou, where her mentor was Gérard Ouédraogo. Nanema also performed in Cellule 512 by the late Missa Hébié. In 2015, she participated in the Parliament of Laughter by the Nigerian comedian Mamane, which was broadcast on Canal+. During the Humorous Festival in 2015, she performed as the satirical leader of a fictitious republic to support the presidential and legislative elections of that year. In 2019, Nanema organized her first one woman show, entitled I salute you Marie, which discussed issues around marriage. This was followed by a subsequent show entitled Marry Me which also addressed marriage, as well as issues such as violence against women. In her shows, she denounces violence against women; she also encourages women to become involved in comedy and theatre.

In 2022, she co-hosted with Frank Donga a comedy show entitled Hello Doc aimed at promoting COVID-19 immunisation programmes in Africa.

== Awards ==
- 2019: Best entertainment event at MADIGO d'Or
- 2020: Prize for the best young ECOWAS comedian at MASA
- 2021: Best comedian at the 12 Cultural Personalities of the Year (PCA)
