= Efe Irele =

Nigerian actress and model (born 1990)

- Born: Efeilomo Michelle Irele; 4 September 1990 (age 35)
- Occupations: Model; Actress
- Website: www.efeirele.com

Efeilomo Michelle Irele (born 4 September 1990) is a Nigerian actress, model, and film producer.

== Early life and career ==
Irele was born in Lagos, Nigeria, where she spent her formative years. but hails from Edo State. She has three siblings. She attended Corona School, Gbagada, Lagos, and had her secondary education at Queen's College, Yaba. She holds a degree in sociology from Bowen University and a master's degree in human resource management from the University of Chester, United Kingdom.

Irele began her career as a model and starred as a video vixen in Burna Boy's "Like to Party" video in 2012 and Adekunle Gold's "Sade" video before transitioning to acting. Her breakout role came in the TV series Lagos Real Fake Life (2018), where she portrayed a modern Nigerian woman navigating societal expectations. Since then, she has appeared in numerous films and TV productions, including Hey You (film) and Two Weeks in Lagos. Irele launched the Efe Irele Autism Foundation in 2018 to cater for autistic children.

== Filmography ==
- Dark Spotlight (2016) as Clara
- Mourning Karen (2017) as Kamsi
- The Real Side Chics (2017) as Keke
- Zahra (2017)
- Jon Ajai (2017)
- Aso Ebi (2016 – 2017)
- Single Ladies
- Lagos Real Fake Life (2018) as Ify
- Stronger Together (2018) as Kindy
- Blood Letters (2018) as Onimi
- Wrong Kind of War (2018)
- Diva (2018)
- Scandals (2018)
- Sophia (2018) as Sophia
- Finding Happiness (2018) as Daisy
- Blind Voice (2019) as Brown
- Two Weeks in Lagos (2019) as Teniola
- Girlfriends (2019) as Simi
- The Krush (2019) as Annabel
- Descendants of the Earth (2020)
- Akpe: Return of the Beast (2020)
- Manifestation (2020)
- Becca’s List (2020) as Becca
- Poor-Ish (2020) as Tessa
- Sweet Melony (2020) as Melony
- Separated (2020) as Kara
- When the Lemons Come (2020)
- Wild Affair (2021) as Doubra
- Bitter Rain (2021) as Fiona
- Restless (2021) as Irene
- Brother (2021) as Beatrice
- Devil in Agbada (2021) as Okikiola
- Hey You (film) (2022) as Bianca
- Twice Shy (2022) as Uche
- Comfort Me (2022) as Temi
- The House of Secrets (2023) as young Sarah
- Worlds Apart (2023)
- As He was written (2023)
- Dice (2023) as Amaka
- A Ghetto Love Story (2024)
- Farmer's Bride (2024)
- Break of Dawn (2024)
- Casa De Novia (2024) as Melina
- Grown (2024) as Osas
- L.I.F.E. (2024) as Yinka

== Awards ==
Year	Award	Category	Result	Ref
2018	City People Entertainment Awards	Best Upcoming Actress of the Year (English)	Won	
2018	City People Entertainment Awards	Best New Actress of the Year (English)	Won	
2019	Best of Nollywood Awards	Revelation of the Year – Female	Nominated	
2023	Africa Magic Viewers' Choice Awards	Best Supporting Actress	Won	

== See also ==
- List of Nigerian actors
