= Charles Uwagbai =

Nigerian filmmaker

- Education: Ekiti State University
- Occupation: Filmmaker

Charles Uwagbai is a Nigerian-Canadian filmmaker. He hails from Edo state in southern Nigeria. Uwagbai is also a media producer and director. He has experience in media production, editing, directing, and animation. His works include TV/radio commercials, documentaries, reality shows and movies, among others.

== Early life ==
Uwagbai is an Edo-born graduate of engineering from Ekiti State University. He enrolled at the New York Film Academy and trained under directors like Andy Amenechi and Alex Mouth. He started his career with motion graphics and animations but has since moved on to make some of Nollywood cinema movies like Black Silhouette, Breathless, The Ghost and the Tout, and Kondo Games.

== Career ==
Uwagbai made his first movie titled Okoro, the Prince in 2010. The movie starred actors such as the late Sam Loco and Alex Osifo. Before then, he was involved in other projects and films. He started out in the music industry, and shot music videos and TV commercials before he ventured into Nollywood.

== Selected filmography ==
- Okoro the Prince - Director, 2013
- Breathless - Director, 2015
- The Black Silhouette - Director, 2015
- Brother Jekwu - Director, 2016
- The Friend Zone - Director, 2017
- Esohe - Director, 2017
- Displaced - Director, 2017
- London Fever - Director, 2017
- The Inlaws - Director, 2017
- Nwanyioma - Director, 2018
- Never Yours - Director, 2018
- What Just Happened - Director, 2018
- The Washerman - Director, 2018
- Akunne - Director, 2018
- Tailor My Heart - Director, 2018
- Expired Maiden - Director, 2018
- The Ghost and the Tout - Director, 2018
- Forever and a Day - Director, 2019
- The African Couple (TV Series) - Director, 2019
- Lucked Up - Director, 2019
- The Gentleman - Director, 2019
- Entangle - Director, 2020
- The Therapist - Director, 2020
- His Queen - Director, 2020
- Nkem - Director, 2020
- A Story from Zazu - Director, 2020
- True Vision - Director, 2020
- Quit Notice - Director, 2021
- Nerve Wreck - Director, 2021
- Charlie Charlie - Director, 2021
- Small Thing - Director, 2021
- Missing - Director, 2021
- Blood of Enogie (TV Series) - Director, 2021
- In the Way of Love - Director, 2022
- Seeking Solace - Director, 2022
- Devil's Angel - Director, 2022
- Celebrity Crash - Director, 2022
- Virtue of Ignorance - Director, 2022
- Half Brothers - Director, 2023
- The Thorn - Director, 2023
- Alone - Director, 2023
- Holy Heist (can a man rob god)** - Director, 2023
- Finding Odera - Director, 2023
- The Wall Street Boy (Kipkemboi) - Director, 2023

== See also ==
- List of Nigerian actors
- List of Nigerian film producers
- List of Nigerian film directors
