= Nonso Diobi =

Nigerian actor

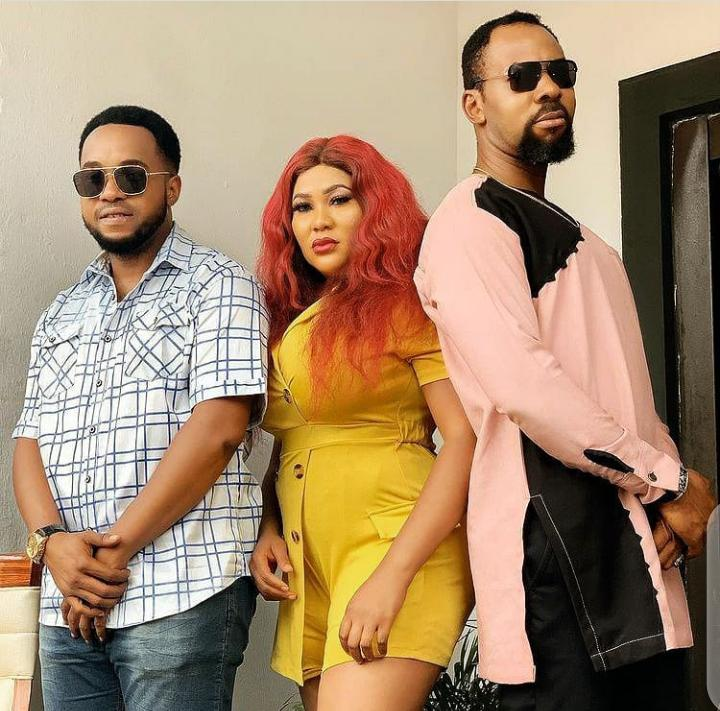
- Born: Nonso Diobi; 17 July 1976 (age 50); Enugu State, Nigeria
- Education: University of Nigeria
- Occupations: actor; film director
- Years active: 2001–present

Nonso Diobi ( //; born 17 July 1976) is a Nigerian actor and film director. While studying theatre art at the University of Nigeria in Enugu State, he made his on-screen debut in the 2001 film Border Line followed by Hatred. His breakthrough role was in Across the Bridge where he gained recognition across Africa. Diobi is a native of Nawfia, in Anambra State. He is the founder and chairman of Golden Tape Media, a film and television production company. Diobi is a UN peace ambassador and an ambassador for Teachers Without Borders. He has starred in over 76 films.

== Filmography ==
Film
Year	Film	Role
2024	House of Terror	Usondu
2023	Endless Love	Father Ejike
2021	Drunk in Jealousy	Tony
2019	Red	
	Least Expected	
	Blue	Timothy
2018	Lagos Real Fake Life	Emeka
2017	To Live a Lie	Kenneth
2017	Seed of Hatred	
	The Wife's Lover	Evans
	The Bushman I Love	Dean
2016	Three Daughters of Eli	
2015	Overseas	Kenneth
2015	The Last 3 Digits	Alex
2015	Olaedo the Fisher Girl	Prince Jeff
2010	Makers of Justice	Desmond
2010	Palace Slave	
2010	Too Much	Richard
2009	Beyond Desire	David
2009	My Last Ambition	Dan
2009	Sexy Girls	
2008	Chasing the Dream	
2008	Last True Sacrifice	
2008	Life Incidence	
2008	Naked Wrestler	Okoro
2008	Offensive Relationship	Harry
2008	Temple of Justice	
2008	The Gods are Wise	
2008	The Lethal Woman	
2008	Tiger King	
2008	Tomorrow Must Wait	Dan
2008	True Sacrifice	
2007	Bafana Bafana	Uche
2007	Desperate Ladies	Jake
2007	Double Game	
2007	Emotional Risk	
2007	End of Evil Doers	Chuka
2007	Final Hour	
2007	Final Risk	
2007	House of Doom	Obinna Snr.
2007	Love and Likeness	Stanley
2007	My Beloved Son	
2007	Naked Kingdom	
2007	Next Door Neighbour	Tony
2007	Power of Justice	
2007	Rush Hour	
2007	Sunny My Son	Kizito
2007	The Cadet	
2007	Unhappy Moment	
2007	Wealth Aside	
2007	Will of God	
2007	World of Commotion	
2006	Ass on Fire	
2006	Before Ordination	Paulson
2006	Be My Val	Bayo
2006	Clash of Interest	Johnson
2006	Divided Secret	Ezenwa
2006	Holy Cross	
2006	In The Closet	Quincy
2006	Last Dance	Damien
2006	Moonlight	
2006	My Girlfriend	
2006	On My Wedding Day	Oscar
2006	Pastor's Blood	Ugonna
2006	Pay Day	
2006	Peace Talk	
2006	Royal Insult	
2006	The Lost Son	
2006	The Wolves	Nicholas
2006	Under Control	
2006	War Game	
2005	The Prince & the Princess	
2005	Across The Bridge	
2005	Back Drop	
2005	Black Bra	Frank
2005	Blood Battle	
2005	C.I.D	
2005	Celebration of Death	
2005	Desperate Love	
2005	Diamond Forever	
2005	Good News	Obinna
2005	Marry Me	
2005	Message	Bernard
2005	Ola... the Morning Sun	
2005	Shock	
2005	Suicide Lovers	
2005	Tears for Nancy	Richard
2005	World of a Prince	
2004	Heritage	Ikenna
2004	Police Woman	
2004	Expensive Game	Jerry
2003	The Richest Man	
2001	Hatred	Nedu
2001	Love Boat	Boat Boy
2001	Never Comeback	
2001	Border Line	
1999	Ijele	Boy 1

== Awards and nominations ==
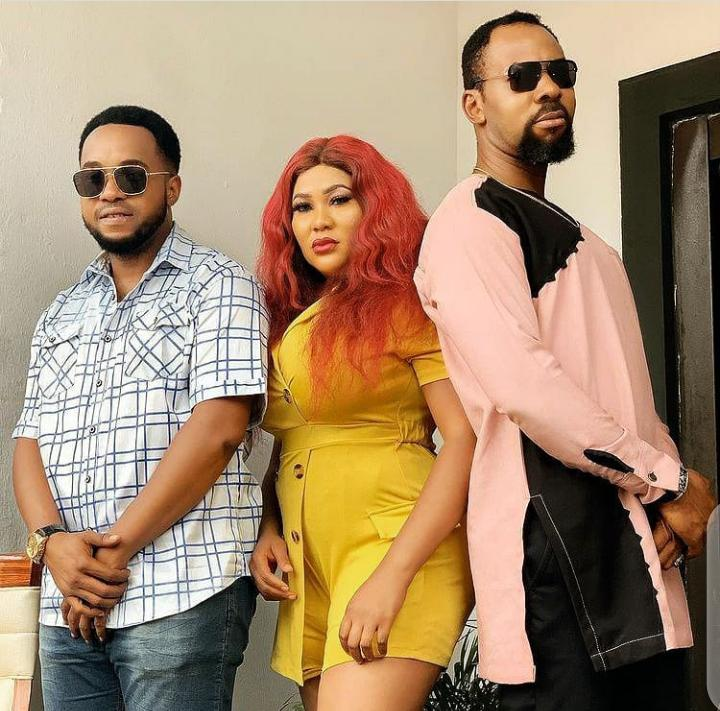
Diobi (left) with Chita Oxe (middle) and Linc Edochie (right), 2021.

Year	Award ceremony	Prize	Result	Ref
2015	3rd Africa Magic Viewers Choice Awards	Best Actor in a Comedy	Nominated	
2014	2014 Golden Icons Academy Movie Awards	Best Actor	Nominated	
