= Ibrahim Adam =

Ghanaian politician (1950–2026)

Ibrahim Issaka Adam

Minister for Agriculture
- In office 1993–1996
- President: John Jerry Rawlings
- Preceded by: Self
- Succeeded by: Steve Obimpeh

Secretary for Agriculture
- In office 1992 – 6 January 1993
- President: John Jerry Rawlings
- Preceded by: Steve Obimpeh
- Succeeded by: Self

Member of Parliament for Choggo/Tishigu
- In office 7 January 1997 – 6 January 2001
- Preceded by: Mohammed Haroon
- Succeeded by: Abubakari Sumani

Personal details
- Born: 1950
- Died: 30 August 2026 (aged 75)
- Party: National Democratic Congress
- Spouse: Selassie Ibrahim
- Occupation: Animal scientist, politician

Ibrahim Adam (1950 – 30 August 2026) was a Ghanaian politician and animal scientist. He was the member of parliament for the Choggo/Tishigu constituency in the Northern Region of Ghana between January 1997 and January 2001.He also served as Minister for Agriculture from 1993-1996.

== Education ==
Ibrahim held a Bachelor of Science (Hons.) in Agriculture. He was an animal scientist by profession.

== Politics ==
Ibrahim was elected to represent the Choggo/Tishigu constituency in the 2nd parliament of the 4th republic of Ghana in the 1996 Ghanaian general election. He was elected on the ticket of the National Democratic Congress. He took over from Ahaji Mohammed Haroon, also of the National Democratic Congress, who represented the constituency in the first parliament of the 4th republic of Ghana. Ibrahim lost his seat to Alhaji Abubakari Sumani in the subsequent elections of 2000.

== Elections ==
Ibrahim was elected with 22,368 votes out of 53,526 valid votes cast representing 41.79% of the total valid votes cast. He was elected over Mohammed A. Sadique of the People's Convention Party, Alhassan Wayo Seini of the New Patriotic Party (NPP), Abubakar Al-Hassan of the National Convention Party, Iddrisu Hudu of the People's National Convention, Abdul-Samed Muhtar of the National Convention Party and Faiz Aouri Moutrage an independent candidate. These obtained 38.86%, 2.60%, 9.38%, 3.25%, 0.86% and 3.26% respectively of the total valid votes cast.

== The Quality Grain Company case ==
In 2003, Adam, Kwame Peprah, former Minister for Finance in the Rawlings government and George Yankey, a former Director of Legal Sector, Private and Financial Institutions were jailed by an Accra Fast Track High Court for causing financial loss to the state. Two others were discharged. This followed the conviction of Juliet Cotton, an American citizen in the United States, president of the Quality Grain Company Ghana Limited for squandering half of the 18 million dollars loaned to her to set up a rice project in Ghana. Adam and Yankey were jailed for two years while Peprah was jailed for four years. There was no evidence that Adam and the accused persons had any personal gain from the fraud. The presiding judge, Kwame Afreh insinuated that they were covering up for Jerry Rawlings, using the Ghanaian Pidgin English phrase, "monkey dey work, baboon dey chop". On his release from prison in 2004, John Atta Mills Vice President in Ghana between 1997 and 2001 and who went on to become president of Ghana between 2009 until his death in 2012 asserted that Adam and Yankey had been unjustly treated. Obed Asamoah also Minister for Foreign Affairs in the Rawlings government said they had been victims of a political vendetta by the NPP Kufuor government. A valuation authorised by the NPP government in 2006 indicated that although the project had been lying idle, there had been no financial loss following the valuation of the assets which seems to agree with the defence Adam and others made that if valued correctly, there had been no loss.

== Personal life and death ==
Ibrahim was married to Selassie Ibrahim (a Ghanaian actress, film producer and an entrepreneur) and they had a son and daughter together.

Ibrahim's death was announced on 30 August 2026.
