= Three Thieves (2019 film) =

2019 Nigerian film

- Directed by: Udoka Oyeka
- Written by: Egbemawei Sammy; Abba Makama; Africa Ukoh
- Produced by: Uche Okocha
- Starring: Shawn Faqua; Koye Kekere-Ekun; Frank Donga
- Cinematography: Kaghor Crowther Idhebor
- Edited by: Iseoluwadoyin Emmanuel
- Music by: Michael ‘Truth" Ogunlade
- Production company: Trino Motion Pictures
- Distributed by: Genesis Distribution
- Release date: 4 October 2019
- Running time: 108 minutes
- Country: Nigeria
- Language: English
- Box office: ₦7,632,369

Three Thieves is a 2019 Nigerian comedy thriller film directed by Udoka Oyeka, written by Egbemawei Sammy, Abba Makama and Africa Ukoh, and produced by Trino Motion Pictures. It was released in cinemas on 4 October 2019.

== Plot ==
Due to a case of mistaken identity, three dissatisfied friends are contracted to commit a seemingly simple theft. Even worse, the man originally contracted for the job is on the hunt for them. Things unfold and they just might be adding kidnapping to the list of crimes they are committing. With a comedic twist to it all, it’s a wonder how they end up as heroes of the day.

== Cast ==
- Koye Kekere-Ekun as Tega
- Shawn Faqua as Oreva
- Frank Donga as Rukevwe
- Angel Unigwe as Fuwe
- 2 Milly Star as Larry
- Lucianne Ukpabi as Adella
- Eric Obinna as Pirate
- Kalu Ikeagwu as Mr Avworo
- Enado Odigie as Mrs Avworo
- Wofai Fada as Aunty Rosanna
- Shaffy Bello as Mrs Gbinije
- Nonso Ngene as Charger
- Micheal Allen as Battery
- David Abalaka as Pinmouth
- Bucci Franklin as Alhaji Change
- Funny bone as Nna Bros
- Omotunde Adebowale David (Lolo) as Tega’s boss
- Imoh Eboh as secretary
- Lolu Agoro as a disgruntled customer
- Charles Okocha as a customer
- Tunji Onochie as the inspector
- Odunlade Adekola as the policeman
- Gregory Ojefua as the station manager
- Emperor Kagho as the new born baby

== Release ==
The official trailer for the film was released on 10 September 2019 and the press screening was held in Lagos on 12 September 2019. Three Thieves premiered at the Genesis Cinemas, Oniru on 27 September 2019, with guests such as Frank Donga and Lasisi Elenu, and was released in cinemas on 4 October 2019.

== Critical reception ==
Three Thieves received reviews from critics. According to Precious of MamaZeus: "If you are ever going to judge anything by its cover or in this case, trailer…. stop! Retrace those steps as Three Thieves is a Nollywood rarity."
Tha Revue praised the movie production and cinematography which gave the audience pleasant viewing experience. He also highlighted the chemistry and comedy between the three lead characters Koye, Shawn and Frank.
Ifeoma Okeke of Business Day Nigeria had this to say as the movie release was approaching: "As Nigerian movies make international recognition, only very few movies have a mix of humor, capture every day to day activity and yet do not losing grip on moral lessons. One such few films are the Three Thieves, which will be out in cinemas on 4 October 2019."
Osa Amadi of Vanguard wrote: "It is a creative work of comedy with the intent to keep the ribs of the audience cracking with laughter from beginning to end, and it succeeded in that objective and even more."

== Accolades ==
=== Film festivals ===
Date	Festival
18 September 2020	Toronto International Nollywood Film Festival
9 October 2020	Silicon Valley African Film Festival
6 December 2020	New York African Film Festival

List of award nominations
Award	Category	Recipients and nominees	Result
Africa Magic Viewers' Choice Awards (2020 Africa Magic Viewers' Choice Awards)	Best Sound Editor	Michael "Truth" Ogunlade	Nominated

== See also ==
- List of Nigerian films of 2019
