= Syndy Emade =

Cameroonian actress (born 1993)

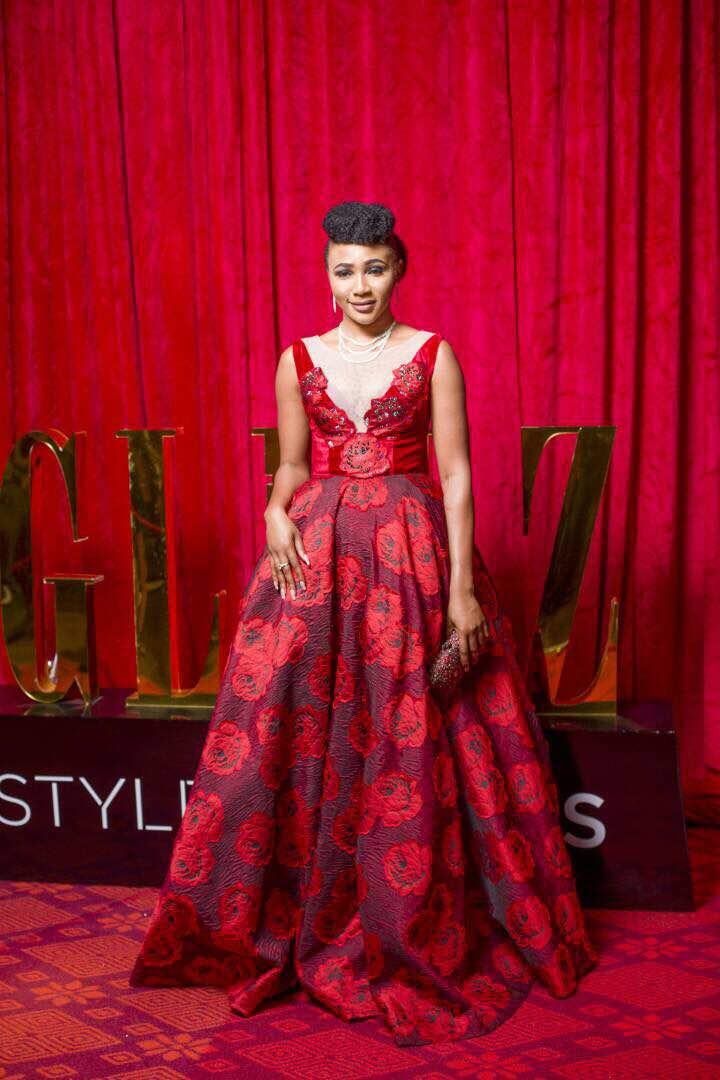
- Emade at Glitz Style Awards in Ghana, August 2017
- Born: Elone Synthia Emade; 21 November 1993 (age 32); Kumba, Southwest Region, Cameroon
- Occupations: Producer, actress, model
- Years active: 2010–present
- Awards: 2014 Miss Heritage Africa, 2017 Scoos Academy award

Syndy Emade (born Elone Synthia Emade; 21 November 1993) is a Cameroonian actress, model and movie producer. She is the Cameroonian brand ambassador for the app InstaVoice Celeb. She is the owner of Blue Rain Entertainment, a movie production company. She has produced a couple of movies amongst which are A Man for the Weekend and Rose on The Grave. She made her international career debut in the Nigerian film industry (Nollywood) in 2016, in the movie “Why I Hate Sunshine”. In 2017, she has been listed second most active Cameroonian actress, according to an online movie streaming channel Njoka TV for African entertainment. She was awarded best Cameroonian actress in Scoos Academy Award 2017. She won the 2014 edition Cameroon Miss Heritage Award.

== Career ==
Emade's debut movie appearance was in the movie “Obsession” which was released in 2010. She is the founder and chair lady of BLUE RAIN Entertainment. Her recent work in 2017 includes A Man For The Weekend featuring Nigerian Nollywood star Alexx Ekubo. She has featured in recent movies like Broken, Silent Storm and A kiss that kills.

== Personal life ==
Syndy Emade lives a very private life and keeps her personal activities away from the public. She is mother to a four-year-old daughter.

== Selected filmography ==
- A Kiss That Kills (2024) as Rita
- Silent Storm (2023)
- Kuvah (2022)
- Half Heaven (2022)
- 4th Generation (2021) as Princess Dibotti
- Broken (2019) as Sandrine Mbassy
- Little Cindy (2018)
- A Man for the Weekend (2017) as Candy
- The Soldier's Wife (2017)
- Before You Say Yes I Do (2017) as Lovette
- Chasing Tails (2016)
- Smokescreen (2016)
- House Mate
- Die Another Day
- Rose on the Grave (2015)
- Bad Angel (2015 TV series) as Verostina
- Why I Hate Sunshine
- Different Kind of Men (2013)
- Pink Poison with Epule Jeffrey (2012)
- Entangled
- Obsession (2010)

== Awards and recognition ==
Year	Award	Category	Recipient	Result
2014	Miss Heritage Africa	Cameroon		Won
2017	Scoos Academy award	Best Actress	Herself	Won

== See also ==
- List of Cameroonian actors
- Cinema of Cameroon
