= Woli Arole =

Nigerian actor and comedian

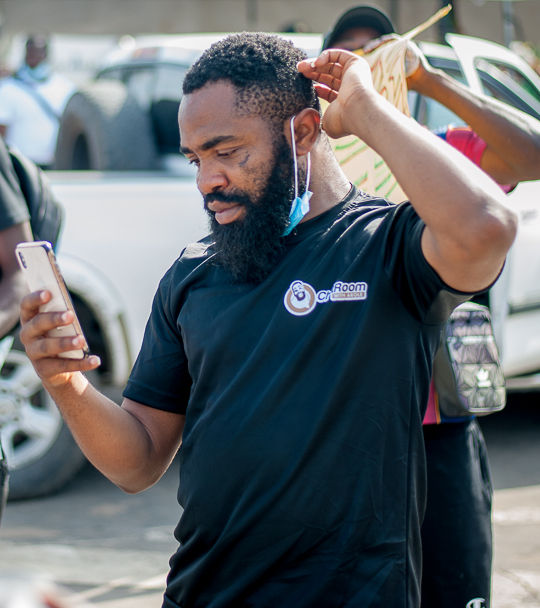
- Born: Bayegun Oluwatoyin; February 22, 1990 (age 36)
- Education: Obafemi Awolowo University

Woli Arole (born February 22, 1990) is a Nigerian comedian, actor and on-air personality. Professionally he is called Arole, Woli Arole.

== Early life and education ==
Woli Arole was born in the city of Ibadan, Nigeria. He had his primary education in Olopade Agoro Apata, Ibadan, and his secondary school education was at Government College, Ibadan. He proceeded to the prestigious Obafemi Awolowo University where he studied psychology. He also obtained a degree in filmmaking in 2020 from the Met Film School in the UK.

== Career ==
Woli Arole started as an actor and stand-up comedian from Obafemi Awolowo University. He embraced social media and gained attention with short videos on Instagram. He auditioned and became a finalist at the Alibaba Spontaneity contest in Lagos. He recently debuted with his live show called ‘The Chat Room With Woli Arole’, on April 8, and it was met with applause.

== Filmography ==
In 2018, Woli Arole premiered his movie titled The Call which he produced and was featured as lead actor.

== See also ==
- List of Nigerian actors
- List of Nigerian film producers
- List of Nigerian film directors
