= Mary Lazarus =

Nigerian actress and movie producer

- Born: Mary Lazarus; Lagos State, Hails from Abia State Nigeria
- Education: University of Ibadan
- Occupations: Actress; Movie producer
- Years active: 2002–Present
- Awards: City People Movie Award for Most Promising Actress of the Year (English) at the City People Entertainment Awards in 2018. City People Movie Awards, 2018 City People Movie Awards

Mary Lazarus (born 5 May) is a Nigerian actress and movie producer who won the City People Movie Award for Most Promising Actress of the Year (English) at the City People Entertainment Awards in 2018 and was nominated for Best Actress in a leading role in the same year at the Best of Nollywood Awards. She also won the award for Most Peaceful Actress of the Year.

== Early life and education ==
Lazarus hails from Abia State in Nigeria, a southeastern geographical location of Nigeria predominantly occupied by the Igbo people of Nigeria. Lazarus is specifically from Ukwa East Local Government Area of Abia State and was born into a family of nine consisting of a mother, a father and six siblings of which she is a twin and one of the last born children of the family alongside her twin brother named Joseph. Lazarus, upon receiving both primary and secondary education and obtaining her First School Leaving Certificate and the West African Senior School Certificate respectively, applied to University of Ibadan in a bid to obtain a university degree. She was accepted and granted admission to study Geography in the institution where she eventually graduated with a 4.4 cumulative grade point average with a B.Sc. degree in Geography.

== Career ==
Lazarus, who is popularly known for her roles in diverse Nollywood movies debuted first as a model in 2002 before venturing into the Nigerian movie industry in 2009 with a movie titled “Waiting Years”. She secured a role in the movie through the help of Gbenro Ajibade who introduced her to John Njamah, the director of the movie who eventually assigned her a role. Lazarus made her directorial debut with a movie titled “Dance To My Beat” of which she also produced in 2017.

Lazarus as a model has made appearances in commercials by Airtel and MTN.

== Influence ==
Lazarus, in an interview with the Vanguard print media, named Nollywood veteran actresses Omotola Jalade Ekeinde and Joke Silva as her role models in the Nigerian movie industry. Lazarus in another interview with The Punch print media named American actress Kimberly Elise as one who she admires because of her extensive body of work.

== Award and nomination ==
Year	Award ceremony	Prize	Result	Ref
2018	City People Movie Awards	Most Promising Actress of the Year (English)	Won	
2018	Best of Nollywood Awards	Best Actress in a Lead Role - English	Nominated	
2020	2020 Africa Magic Viewers' Choice Awards	Best Supporting Actress in a Movie or TV Series - Size 12	Nominated	

== Personal life ==
Lazarus comes from a family of nine and is one of the lastborn children of her parents alongside her twin brother. In an interview with The Punch print media she described herself as a fun-loving person.

== Selected filmography and TV series ==
- Iron Bar (2024) as Asari
- Saving Onome (2024) as Oreoluwa
- Reversed Game (2023) as Faith
- Bridges of Trust (2023) as Sarah
- Blood Ties (2022) as Karen
- Tainted (2022) as Mara
- Perfect Neighbour (2021) as Amaka
- It takes Two (2021) as Elise
- When Life Happens (2020) as Cindy | with Lota Chukwu, Jimmy Odukoya, Wole Ojo
- My Woman (2019) as Zara | with Seun Akinyele, Ujams C'briel
- Accidental Affair (2019) as Kristen
- Clustered Colours (2019)
- Broken Pieces (2018)
- Homely: What Men Want (2018) as Keji
- Dance To My Beat (2017)
- The Road Not Taken II (2017)
- Love Lost (2017) as Rena
- Girls Are Not Smiling (2016)
- What Makes You Tick (2016) as Ann Okojie
- Okafor's Law (2016) as Kamsi
- Better Than The Beginning (2015)
- Bad Drop (2015)
- Losing Control (2015) as Uche
- Second Chances (2014) as Justina
- Desperate Housegirls (2013)
- Married but Living Single (2012) as Binta
- Waiting Years (2010)
