= Mike Ezuruonye =

Nigerian actor (born 1982)

- Born: 21 September 1982 (age 43); Lagos, Nigeria
- Education: Nnamdi Azikiwe University, Awka, Anambra State
- Occupation: Actor
- Spouse: Nkechi Nnorom (m. 2010)
- Children: 2

Michael "Mike" Ezuruonye (born 21 September 1982) is a Nollywood actor.

== Early life and career ==
Ezuruonye is from Uzuakoli in Abia State, South East, Nigeria. He was born on 21 September 1982, in Lagos State. Ezuruonye attended the Federal Government College in Wukari, and Archbishop Aggey Memorial School in Lagos State. He studied accounting at Nnamdi Azikiwe University, and worked as a banker prior to becoming an actor.

He has featured in several Nollywood movies. He was nominated for Best Actor in a Leading Role for his performance in The Assassin at the Africa Movie Academy Awards in 2009, and was also nominated for Best Actor in the Africa Magic Viewer's Choice Awards that same year.

In 2025, Mike Ezuruonye continued to demonstrate his box-office appeal as one of the top ten highest-grossing Nollywood actors of the year, with cumulative earnings from several successful cinema releases.

== Personal life ==
Ezuruonye married Nkechi Nnorom in November 2010. They had their traditional wedding in May 2010 in Abia State and their white wedding in November 2010 at Folawiyo Bankole Methodist Church in Lagos. Their wedding was attended by many celebrities and dignitaries. They have two children. Ezuruonye stated in an interview that he came from a very solid background and added that his family was decent and comfortable. He also commented that top political parties had approached him to join politics, but he preferred to step in when he was fully prepared for it.

== Selected filmography ==
- As Complicated (2020)
- Bitter Rain (2021) as Nnamdi
- Brother Jekwu (2016) as Brother Jekwu
- Critical Decision
- Dark Listed (2019)
- Deal Breaker (2021) as Adam
- Desire (2008) as Desmond
- Divorce Not Allowed (2018) as Hycent
- Daddies Face Off (2021)
- Flipped (2021) as Naeto
- Keep Me Alive (2008)
- Lagos Real Fake Life (2018) as Chidi
- Occultic Kingdom
- Precious Secrets (2022)
- Pregnant Daddy (2023) as Oscar
- Ridicule (2023) as Oliver
- Ropes of Fate (2010) as Samuel
- Shattered (2021)
- Soul Behaviour (2020)
- Soul Gigolo (2020)
- That Other Good Turn (2021) as Edwin
- The Assassin
- The Debt (2021)
- The Donor (2021) as Ejiro
- The Tenant
- To Kill a Ghost (2023) as Dennis
- Bola's Baggage (2023)
- She Must Be Obeyed (2023) as Livinus
- The Dead (2023) as Chinedu
- Unforeseen (2005)
- Unpredictables (2022)
- Endless Passion (2005) as Kingsley
- Broken Marriage
- Beyond Reason
- Unforgivable (2014) as Damola
- Calabash Part 1 & Part 2 (2014)
- The Duplex (2015) as Emeka
- Living with a Ghost (2015)
- Breathless (2015) as Ben
- 'Forbidden Choice (2014) as Johnson
- Break of Dawn (2024)
- Cramp My Style (2024)
- 3 Working Days (2024)
- Family Gbese (2024)
- Heart of a Brother (2024) as Chibunna

== Awards and nominations ==
Year	Movie	Award	Category	Result
2009	The Assassin	Africa Movie Academy Awards	Best Actor	Nominated
2014	Unforgivable	Africa Magic Viewers Choice Awards	Best Actor	
2014	Unforgivable	Golden Icons Academy Movie Awards	Best Actor	
2014	Unforgivable	City People Entertainment Awards	Best Actor	
2014	Unforgivable	Nollywood Movies Awards	Best Actor	
2015	The Tenant	Zulu African Film Academy Awards	Best Actor	
2016	Brother Jekwu	Golden Movie Awards		
