= IK Ogbonna =

Nigerian actor (born 1984)

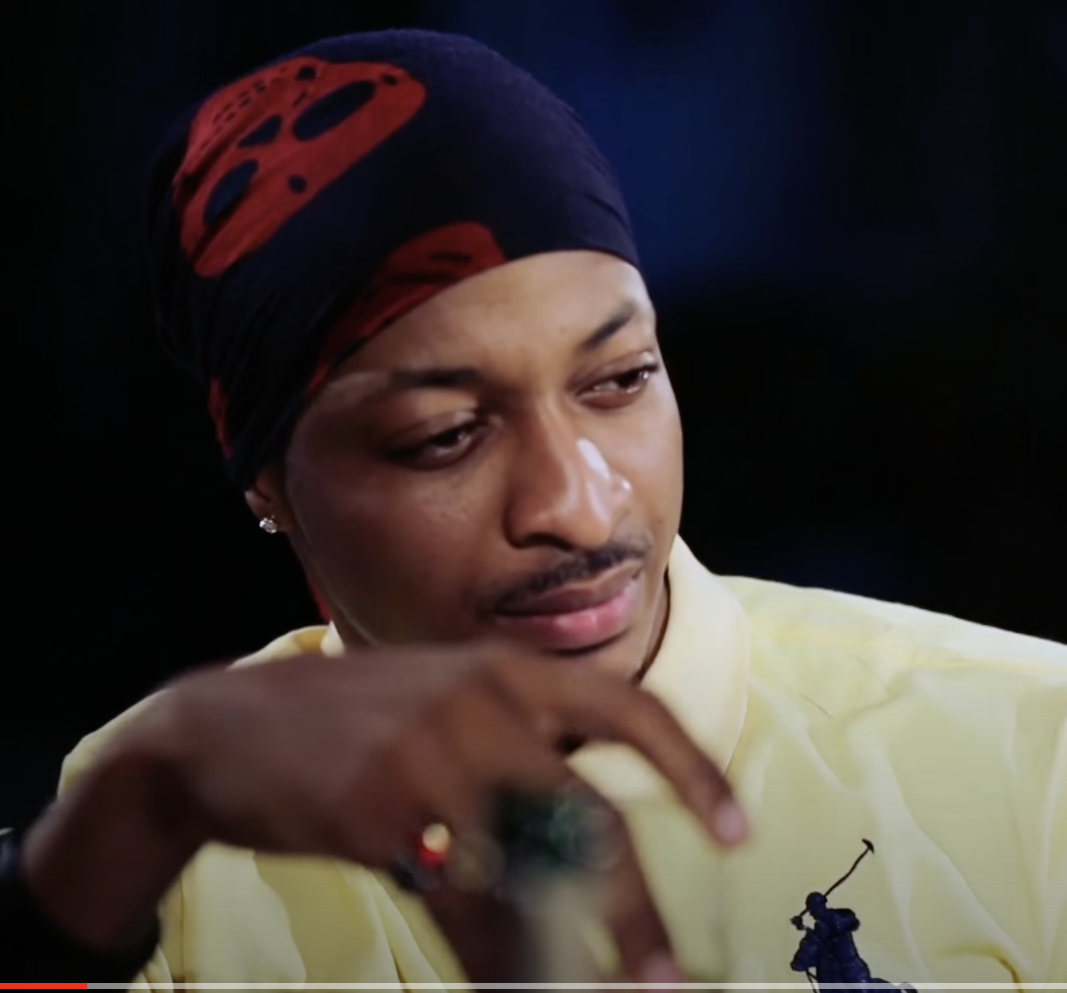
- IK Ogbonna
- Born: 11 January 1984 (age 42)
- Occupations: Actor, model, TV personality
- Years active: 2013–present
- Spouse: Sonia Morales (m. 2015, divorced)
- Children: 2

Ikechukwu Mitchel Ogbonna (born 11 January 1984), professionally known as IK Ogbonna, is a Nigerian film and television actor, model, director, and television personality. He is a Director, Model and TV Personality. He was in the movie Playing Safe alongside Tonto Dikeh and Ini Edo.

== Education ==
Ik obtained his primary and secondary education in Lagos State, where he attained his First Leaving Certificate and West African Senior School Certificate respectively. He graduated with a bachelor's degree in sociology from the University of Jos in Plateau State.

The Actor bags Doctorate Degree of Arts in Leadership and Development from Institut Supérieur De Management et de Technologie (ISMT).

== Career ==
Ogbonna took part in the audition for the Amstel Malta Box Office television show in 2005 and was picked. He has been a model for quite a long time. While in secondary school he won the Milo Awards for Fine Arts

His debut in the film industry started in 2013 when he starred in Love Lorn.

He is currently a Judge at De9jaspirit Talent Hunt show.

== Personal life ==
Ogbonna told The Vanguard in 2023 that his relationships start with friendships because he doesn't know how to ask a woman out. He was once married to Sonia Morales and they have a son, Ace Ogbonna. Additionally, he has a daughter named Makayla from a previous relationship.

== Filmography ==
- Save a Soul (2007) as David
- A Wish (2012)
- Lovelorn (2012)
- Playing Safe (2013) as Laporsche
- Stolen Tomorrow (2013)
- In Her Shoes (2013) as Ben
- The Wrong Selfie (2014) as Alex
- Hustlers (2014) as Cliff
- Golden Diggin (2014) as Ik
- Blurred Lines (2014)
- Honeymoon Hotel (2014)
- My Rich Boyfriend (2014)
- Ikogosi (2015) as George
- Open Marriage (2015) as Kelvin
- Black Bird (2015) as Chuks
- A Week to My Wedding (2016) as Pedro
- Ghana Must Go (2016)
- Hire a Man (2017) as Benjamin
- Pebbles of Love (2017) Gilbert
- Excess Luggage (2017) as Enyinna
- Disguise (2018) as Belinda/Lambo
- The Washerman (2018) as Boniface
- SHOWBIZ (2019)
- The Confessor (2019) as Rev. Frank
- Unroyal (2020) as Prince Leonard
- Soft Work (2020) as Dr. J.
- A Way Back Home (2021) as George
- Christmas in Miami (2021) as Nite Club PR
- I am Nazzy (2022)
- Blunder (2022) as Jasper
- The Switch (2023) as Pablo
- Loving Belinda (2023) as Chucks
- Teni's Big Day (2023) as Benjamin
- By All Means (2024) as Nonso
- How I Love to be Loved (2024) as Olisa
- All That Glitters (2024) as Chuks
- Move Like a Boss (2024)

== Awards and nominations ==
Year	Award	Category	Result	Ref
2015	African Magic Viewers’ Choice Awards	Outstanding Actor at the Abuja	Nominated	
2017	Best of Nollywood Awards	Best Supporting Actor –English	Nominated	
2018	City People Movie Award	Best Actor of the Year	Nominated	
	Best of Nollywood Awards	Best Actor in a Lead role – English	Nominated	
	Best of Nollywood Awards	Best Kiss in a Movie	Won	

== See also ==
- List of Nigerian actors
- List of Nigerian film directors
