= Alexx Ekubo =

Nigerian actor and model (1986–2026)

- Born: Alexx Ikenna Ekubo-Okwaraekee; 10 April 1986; Arochukwu, Abia State, Nigeria
- Died: 11 May 2026 (aged 40); Lagos, Nigeria
- Education: University of Calabar
- Occupations: Actor, entertainer, humanitarian

Alex Ikenna Ekubo-Okwaraeke (10 April 1986 – 11 May 2026) was a Nigerian actor, known for acting in Nollywood. Ekubo was the first runner-up at the 2010 Mr Nigeria contest and later starred in Weekend Getaway. In 2020, he was recognised among the "Most Influential People of African Descent" under 40 for his contributions to entertainment and social development in Africa.

== Early life and education ==
Alex Ekubo-Okwaraeke was from Arochukwu in Abia State. He attended Federal Government College Daura in Katsina State and studied law at the University of Calabar. in 2021, he received an honorary degree in arts and culture from the Institut Supérieur de Communication et de Gestion (ISCG University) in Cotonou, Benin.

== Career ==
Ekubo's film debut was a minor role in Lancelot Oduwa Imaseun's Sinners in the House (2003). He later appeared in films including Afamefuna: An Nwa Boi Story, Power of 1, A Sunday Affair, Omo Ghetto: The Saga, The Bling Lagosians, Catch.er, Zero Hour, The First Lady, Lagos Cougars, and Weekend Getaway, often portraying charismatic or comedic characters. His performances have been praised for blending humour, emotional depth, and commercial appeal.

Ekubo appeared in over 100 films and worked with several Nollywood filmmakers. His appearances at film festivals worldwide and work with streaming platforms enhanced his international profile.

== Philanthropy and advocacy ==
Beyond entertainment, Ekubo was known for his humanitarian and youth advocacy work. He participated in numerous charitable initiatives and outreach programmes across Nigeria and West Africa. In 2020 He received a certificate of excellence from the Sapio Club SGD (Sustainable Goals Development) for his contributions to entertainment and humanitarian efforts in Africa. In 2021, he received the Global Social Giving Actor of the Year by the Nigerian National Awards for his charitable works.

In 2023, Ekubo was recognised as the Rotary Youth Ambassador of the Year under Rotary International District 9142.

== Personal life and death ==
Ekubo was known for his fashion style and appeared on several best-dressed lists across Africa. He maintained a private lifestyle and used his platform to advocate for social causes and youth empowerment.

Ekubo died on 11 May 2026, at the age of 40 at Evercare Hospital, Lagos, following complications from advanced metastatic kidney cancer, a battle his family described as "brief but courageous." Following his death, his family revealed that he had been privately married, to Anwuli Ekubo-Okwareke, and that the couple had a child together. Ekubo had been largely absent from public life and social media since late 2024. He was buried in his hometown of Arochukwu, Abia State, with funeral services held from 17 to 18 June 2026; in a tribute published in his funeral pamphlet, his wife described him as her "anchor" and recalled their shared faith and private nicknames for one another.

== Television ==
- Secrets & Scandals
- Hope Bay
- Happy Family
- Tinsel
- AY's Crib (2013–2015) as JJ
- Married to the Game (2014–2015) as Vincent Coker

== Filmography ==
- Ladies Gang (2011) as Jude
- Aina (2011) as Handsome Man
- Weekend Getaway (2012) as Andre Dikeh
- True Citizens (2012)
- In the Cupboard (2012) as Tega
- Dream Walker (2013) as Dream Man
- Keeping my Man (2013) as Rasheed
- Lagos Cougars (2013) as Chigo
- Champagne (2014) as Tare Hopewell
- Single, Married and Complicated (2014)
- Ifedolapo (2014) as Richard
- Gold Diggin (2014) (with Yvonne Nelson and Rukky Sanda) as Chris
- Undercover Lover (2015) as Collins
- All that Glitters (2015)
- The First Lady (2015) (with Omoni Oboli) as Obama
- Gbomo Gbomo Express (2015) as Hubby
- Luke of Lies (2015) as Luke
- Death Toll (2015)
- Entreat (2016) as Michael Olawale
- The Other Side of the Coin (2016)
- Diary of a Lagos Girl (2016) as Ife
- Wife Material (2017) as Tony
- A Man for the Weekend (2017) (with Syndy Emade) as Bryan
- Catcher (2017) as Tony Bello
- 3 is a Crowd (2017) as Derek
- Hot Girl Next Door (2018) as Ken
- Switch (2018) as Leo
- Power of 1 (2018) as LeJit
- The American King: As told by an African Priestess (2019)
- Bling Lagosians (2019) as Nnamdi
- Zero Hour (2019) as Zamani Davou
- Your Excellency (2019) as Kachi
- 72 hours (2019)
- Soft Work (2020) as Dare Olusegun
- Son of Mercy (2020) as Efe
- Bitter Rain (2021) as TY
- The Real Us (2021) as Nnamdi
- Charlie Charlie (2021)
- Tiger Tails (2022) as Udoka
- The American King (2022)
- Almajiri (2022)
- The Blood Covenant (2022) as Obi
- Áfàméfùnà: An Nwa Boi Story (2023)
- Peace Be Still (2023)
- A Sunday Affair (2023) as Femi
- Rush Hour (2024) as Abuchi
- Smiling Masks (2024)

== Awards and nominations ==
| Year | Award | Category | Film | Result | Ref |
|---|---|---|---|---|---|
| 2012 | Best of Nollywood Awards | Most Promising Actor | In The Cupboard | Won | |
| 2013 | Golden Icons Academy Movie Awards | Best Supporting Actor | Weekend Getaway | Won | |
| 2013 | Best of Nollywood Awards | Best Supporting Actor | Weekend Getaway | Won | |
| 2014 | Screen Nation Awards | Favourite Male Emerging Screen Talent (African) | Himself | Won | |
| 2017 | Best of Nollywood Awards | Best Actor in a Lead role – English | Inikpi | Nominated | |
| 2020 | Best of Nollywood Awards | Best Actor in a Supporting Role (English) | The Bling Lagosians | Won | |
| 2020 | Best of Nollywood Awards | Best Kiss in a Movie | The Bling Lagosians | Nominated | |
| 2021 | Net Honours | Most Popular Actor | | Won | |

== See also ==
- List of Nigerian actors
