= Hijack '93 =

2024 Nigeria drama film

Hijack 93
- Theatrical release poster
- Directed by: Robert O. Peters
- Screenplay by: Musa Jeffery David
- Produced by: Rogers Ofime; Charles Okpaleke
- Starring: Allison Emmanuel; Adam Garba; Nnamdi Agbo; Oluwaseyi Akinsola; Akash Singh; Jessica Loraine; Bob Manuel; Nancy Isime; Sam Dede; John Dumelo; Sharon Ooja
- Edited by: Johan Venter
- Music by: Gray Jones Ossai
- Production companies: Netflix; Play Network Studios; Native Media
- Distributed by: Netflix
- Release date: 25 October 2024
- Running time: 86 minutes
- Country: Nigeria
- Languages: English; French

Hijack '93 is a 2024 Nigerian disaster film directed by Robert O. Peters and written by Musa Jeffery David. It is based on the 1993 Nigerian Airways hijack. The film stars Nnamdi Agbo, Adam Garba, Allison Emmanuel, Oluwaseyi Akinsola, Sam Dede, Bob Manuel, John Dumelo, Idia Aisien, Nancy Isime, Efa Iwara, and Sharon Ooja. It portrays a group of four teenagers who hijack a Nigerian aircraft, demanding Ibrahim Babangida, the country's Defense Minister, to resign from office.

Hijack 93 premiered on Netflix on 25 October 2024. Upon release, it gained substantial viewership, amassing 3.2 million views and securing the 9th spot in Netflix Nigeria's top 10 list during its debut week marking it as the fourth Nollywood title of 2024 to achieve this milestone.

== Plot ==
Four teenage boys, Skipper, Eruku, Owiwi, and Iku, drive to the airport and board a Nigerian airways Boeing 747. The aircraft pilots are Captains Ambrose and Odion, and it is scheduled to depart from Lagos to Abuja on 25 October 1993. Shortly after takeoff, the four armed teenagers take control of the aircraft, announcing that they are members of MAD (Movement for the Actualization of Democracy). They demand that the pilots change location to Frankfurt in Germany. As passengers panic, the group reveals their intention saying that they want the resignation of Sani Abacha, the Defence Minister of Nigeria.

The aircraft eventually lands in Niamey because of low fuel, but the hijacking has caught the attention of local news and international media. The Nigerian authorities begin a rescue operation. Owiwi is angry that the plane lands in Niger and he threatens to kill one of the passengers in order to show it. Captain Kenneth Dokunbo, commander of the special forces, takes charge. He and others discover Lee Zhang, the son of the Chinese Ambassador to Nigeria, on the plane. He realizes that a rescue mission would potentially subdue the hijackers, but they cannot risk the life of Rong Yiren, the vice president of China. The hijackers release women and children and indicate that they would surrender if their demands are met.

== Cast ==
=== Hijackers ===
- Nnamdi Agbo as Omar (Skipper)
- Adam Garba as Kayode (Eruku)
- Allison Emmanuel as Ben (Owiwi)
- Oluwaseyi Akinsola as Dayo (Iku)

=== Crew ===
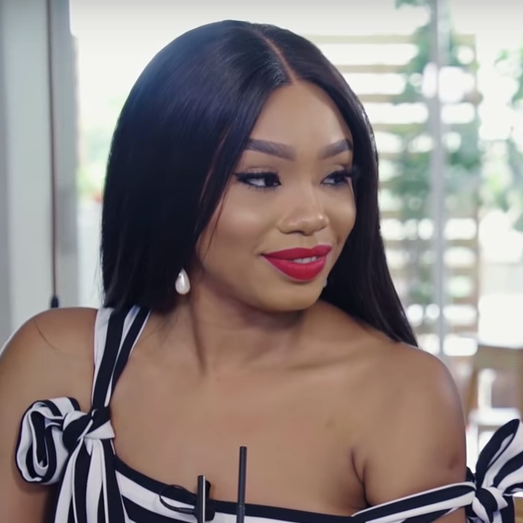
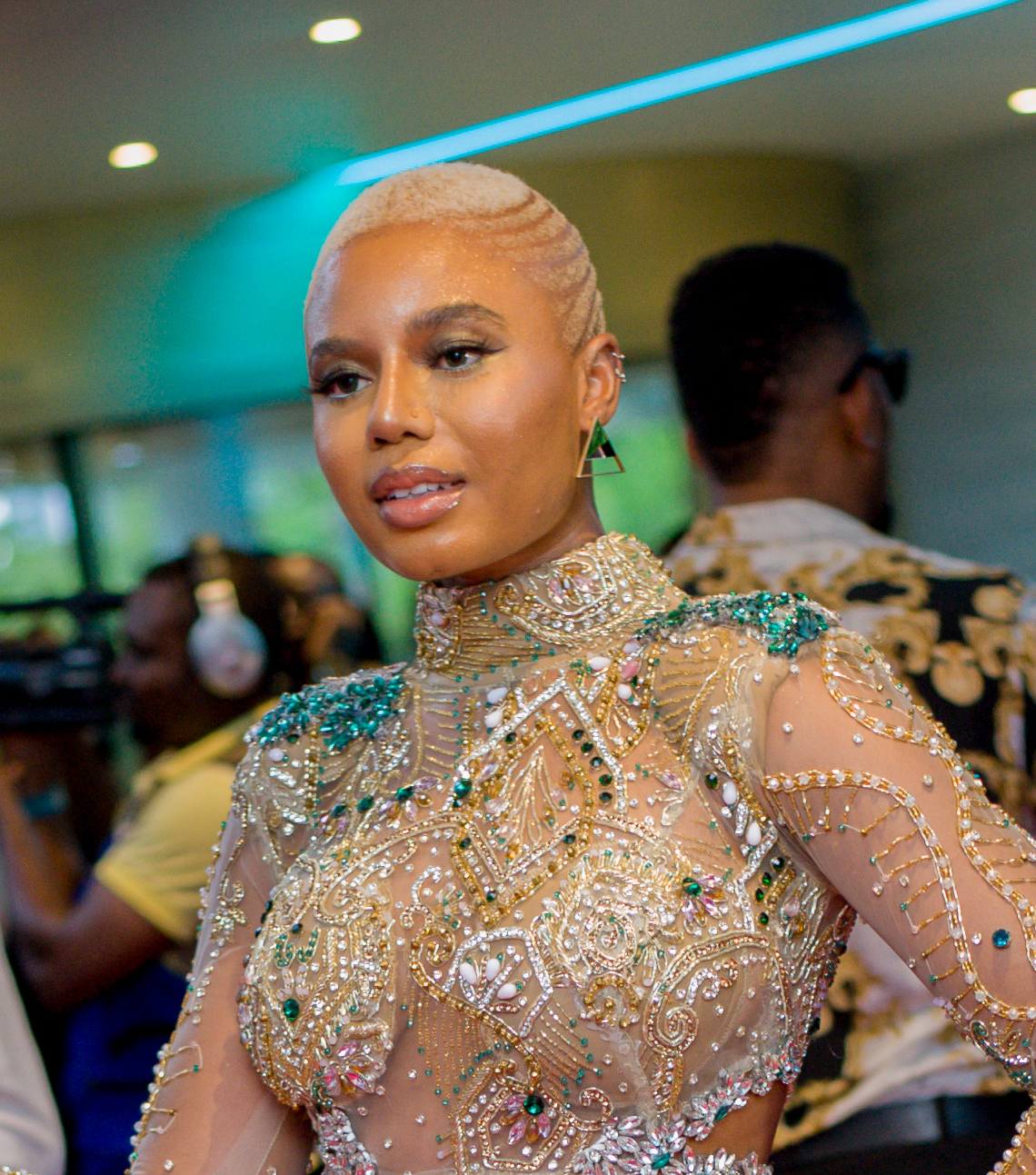
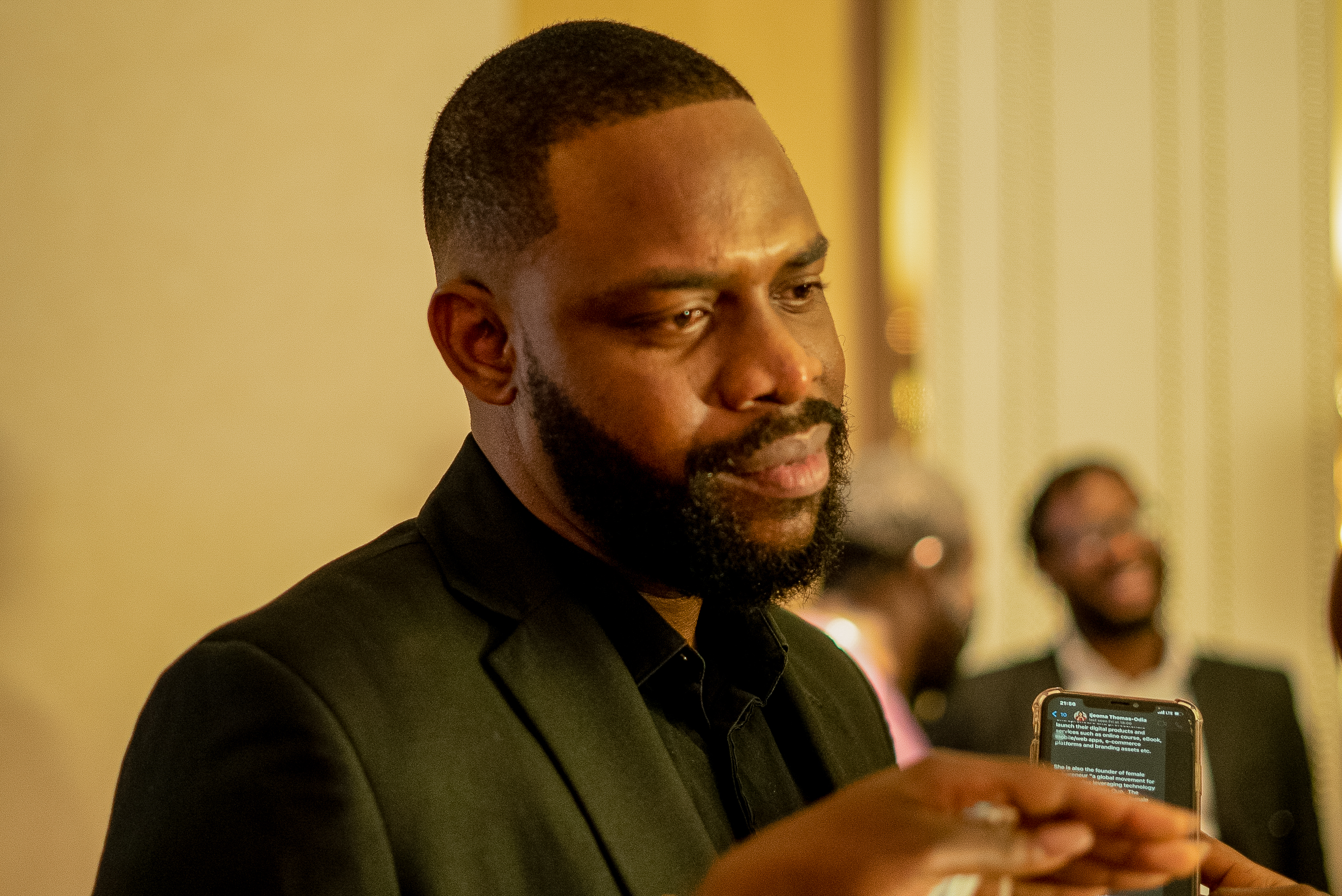
- Crew Members: (left to right) Sharon Ooja, Nancy Isime and Efa Iwara
- Sharon Ooja as Ada
- Nancy Isime as Iyabo
- Jemima Osunde as Temitope
- Idia Aisien as Ese
- John Dumelo as Captain Ambrose
- Efa Iwara as Captain Odion

=== Supporting characters ===
- Bob Manuel as Lieutenant Dokunbo
- Jessica Lorraine as Marie
- Sam Dede as Mallam Jerry
- Ego Nwosu as Rev Sis Lola
- Kalu Ikeagwu as Ben Senior
- Pasha Bay as Captain Gana
- David A. Obasa as Dr Moussa
- Akash Singh as Lee Zhang
- Freddie George as Mazi Igbokwe
- Sani Mua'za as Judge Tanko
- Yakubu Mohammed as Usman

== Production ==
=== Development ===
In May 2021, it was announced that three Nigerian filmmakers Rogers Ofime, Charles Okpaleke, and Agozie Ugwu along with Play Network Studios, Native Media TV, and UK-based filmmaker Femi Oyeniran, had teamed up to produce a new film, Hijack 93, based on the true story of the 1993 plane hijacking. The production received support from the United Kingdom's Department of International Trade (DIT) and the British Film Institute (BFI), to bring the event to life through cinema.

=== Filming ===
Principal photography began in May 2023 at Play Network Studios in Nigeria, who previously collaborated with Charles Okpaleke on the Nneka the Pretty Serpent, Living in Bondage: Breaking Free, Rattle Snake: The Ahanna Story, and Glamour Girls. The announcement was made by Charles Okpaleke, stating,

Remember the story of the teenagers that hijacked a Nigerian Airways plane headed to Abuja and diverted it to Niger in 1993? The 4 boys (who are in their 50's now) went to prison for over a decade. I was privileged to interview 3 of them 2 years ago and they gave me a detailed explanation on how they carried out the first ever plane hijack in Nigeria. Their story is now being adapted into a feature film for the world to see by Play Network Studios and Native media.

=== Post-production ===
In 2023, Charles Okpaleke shared behind-the-scenes (BTS) photos from the set of Hijack 93: The Mad Men & The Aircraft. He mentioned on Instagram that Efa Iwara plays the role of co-pilot alongside John Dumelo. In his post, Okpaleke revealed that the actors underwent three months of training at aviation school and that filming had wrapped up, entering an extensive post-production phase.

== Historical accuracy ==
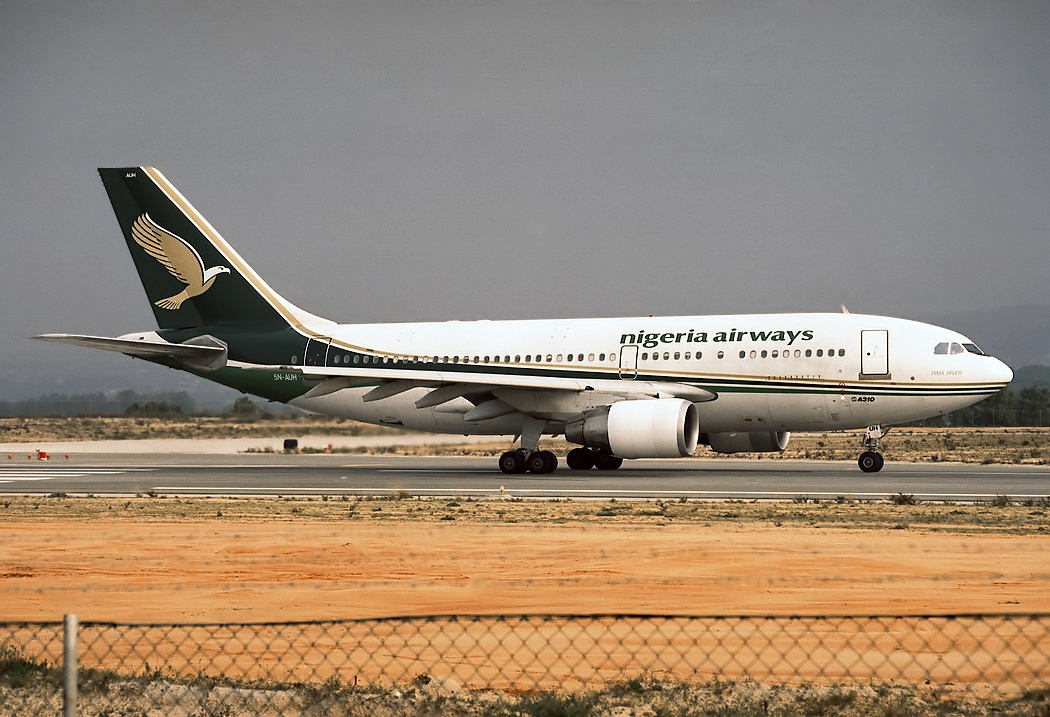
Nigerian Airways Airbus A310-221, registration 5N-AUH, involved to the hijack

The Nigeria Airways Flight 470 hijack was an aviation incident on 25 October 1993, involving a domestic Nigerian Airways flight. The Nigerian Airways Airbus A310-221 aircraft, flight WT-470 was en route from Lagos to Abuja, Nigeria, carrying 132 passengers and 11 crew members, when four teenagers aged 16 to 18 years hijacked it.

The incident occurred during political instability in Nigeria following the annulment of the 12 June 1993, presidential election, which had been widely considered free and fair. The annulment, by military ruler General Ibrahim Babangida, led to widespread protests and civil unrest, culminating in a tense political climate. Following Babangida's resignation, Chief Ernest Shonekan was interim president in August 1993, but his administration faced significant opposition.

The film portrays the hijacking as being orchestrated by Mallam Jerry Yusuf, a political teacher and revolutionary, leader of the Movement for the Advancement of Democracy (MAD),"a rebel group operating in the country. The hijackers initially intended to divert the plane to Frankfurt, Germany or Kotoko, Ghana, and it was reported that there were no casualties or loss of passenger lives. However, the film dramatizes the events, depicting a scene where a passenger is shot and killed by one of the hijackers.

=== Negotiations and resolution ===
The Nigerian government, in collaboration with Nigerien authorities, engaged in negotiations with the hijackers. After hours of tense discussions, the hijackers, Richard Ajibola Ogunderu, Kabir Adenuga, Benneth Oluwadaisi and Kenny Razak-Lawal, agreed to release the hostages in exchange for safe passage. During the negotiations, one passenger was reported to have been killed, although details about the circumstances of the death remain unclear.

The standoff ended peacefully after they surrendered to Nigerien authorities. They were later extradited to Nigeria, where they faced charges related to the hijacking.

== Release ==
On 3 October 2024, Netflix released a trailer for the film. The film was released in theaters in Nigeria on 25 October 2024, by Play Network Studios, in partnership with Netflix.

== Reception ==
=== Audience viewership ===
Following its premiere on 25 October 2024, Hijack '93 quickly garnered significant viewership on Netflix, amassing 3.2 million views and securing a spot in Netflix Nigeria's top 10 list within its debut week. The film achieved notable success by reaching 9th place in Netflix's Nigeria rankings, making it the fourth Nollywood title of 2024 to enter these rankings. on 12 November 2024, Hijack '93 ranked third on the Netflix Global Chart for most-watched English films, amassing 7.3 million views. It secured a spot in the Top 10 across 61 countries, marking it as only the second Nigerian film to achieve such extensive global reach.

=== Critical response ===
Noghama Ehioghae of African Folder rated Hijack '93 a 3.6 out of 10, describing it as a "failed attempt to convey both the emotional weight and historical significance of the events." Ehioghae noted that the film's lack of backstory for the kidnappers makes it difficult for viewers to understand the events and the motivations behind the airplane hijacking.

Neerja Choudhuri of Midgard Times described Hijack '93 as a "well-crafted thriller," praising the film's screenplay. She remarked, "The screenplay does a commendable job capturing the high stakes inside the plane, with tensions mounting as the hours tick by." Neerja also commended the "outstanding performances" by the cast and gave the film an 8 out of 10 rating.

Omoleye Omoruyi of Technext24 awarded Hijack '93 a rating of 2 out of 10 stars, criticizing the film for offering "the bait of historical intrigue" but ultimately delivering "a jumble of loosely connected scenes and uninspired storytelling." According to Omoruyi, while the film spotlights a compelling historical event, it falls short in effectively conveying its narrative, coming across as "less of a movie and more of a rushed montage." He concludes, "We came to experience history; instead, we were hijacked by cliché."

=== Response from hijackers family ===
On 26 October 2024, Pa Yemi Ogunderu, the father of Richard Ogunderu, one of the hijackers involved in the 1993 Nigerian Airways hijacking to protest the annulment of the 1993 presidential election, widely believed to have been won by the late MKO Abiola—shared his thoughts in an interview regarding the film. He stated, "Richard was never a violent child, and I could never have expected such actions from him. He is an easygoing person, and he has no regrets. His only regret is that he wishes he had stayed in Niger Republic, where he had become a household name."
