= Rattlesnake: The Ahanna Story (soundtrack) =

Studio album by Larry Gaaga
- Released: November 12, 2020
- Genre: Highlife Afrobeats Hip Hop
- Length: 29:00
- Language: English; Pidgin
- Label: Gaaga Muzik
- Producer: Larry Gaaga; Charles Okpaleke

Larry Gaaga chronology
Living In Bondage: Breaking Free (Original Motion Picture Soundtrack) (2019)	Rattlesnake: The Ahanna Story (2020)

Rattlesnake: The Ahanna Story soundtrack is an album produced by Larry Gaaga. It is the official soundtrack album of the movie Rattlesnake: The Ahanna Story.

== Background ==
The 8-track album has a running time of 29 minutes, with production credits from Puffy T, Masterkraft, Marvio and Richie. The album features Davido, Patoranking, 2Baba, Umu Obiligbo, Sound Sultan, Mazi Floss, D'banj, Uzikwendu, Magnito, Zoro, Acetune, Mr Chyke, Waga G, Slow Dogg, Marvio, and Sugarbana.

== Singles ==
Larry Gaaga released "Doubting Thomas" featuring Davido and Umu Obiligbo as a single.

== Reception ==
Professional ratings
Review scores
Source	Rating
Pulse Nigeria	8.0/10

Motolani Alake of Pulse Ng rated the album 8.0/10, adding that the album is arguably the best posse cut Nigerian hip hop has seen in 2020.

== Track listing ==
No.	Title	Length
1.	"Ihotun" (Featuring 2Baba, Sound Sultan and Mazi Floss)	4:32
2.	"Doubting Thomas" (featuring Davido and Umu Obiligbo)	3:29
3.	"This Life" (featuring Patoranking, D'banj, and Umu Obiligbo)	3:35
4.	"Abeg" (featuring Uzikwendu)	4:02
5.	"How to Love" (featuring Acetune)	3:31
6.	"Buga" (featuring Waga G, Mrs Chyke)	3:38
7.	"Whyne" (featuring Sugar Bana)	4:03
8.	"Rattle Snake" (featuring Marvio)	2:25
Total length:		29:00

== See also ==
- Rattlesnake: The Ahanna Story
- Living in Bondage: Breaking Free
