= Blyden Amajirionwu =

Nigerian politician

State Representative
- Succeeded by: Obinna Egu
- Constituency: Ngor Okpala

Personal details
- Occupation: Politician

Blyden Amajirionwu is a Nigerian politician. He served as a member of the Imo State House of Assembly, representing the Ngor Okpala state constituency. He was succeeded by Obinna Egu.
