= Okpala =

Okpala is a Nigerian surname. Notable people with the surname include:

- Chika Okpala (born 1950), Nigerian comedian
- Godwin Okpala (born 1949), Nigerian Anglican bishop
- Michael Okpala (1939-2001), Nigerian wrestler
- Ngor Okpala, Local Government Area in Imo State, Nigeria
- Nneka Okpala (born 1988), New Zealand triple-jumper
- Kennedy Okpala (born 2004), German footballer
- KZ Okpala (born 1999), Nigerian and American basketball player
- Sylvanus Okpala (born 1961), Nigerian footballer
- Victor Okpala, Nigerian entrepreneur, culture curator andfounder of NABSolute Media

== See also ==
- Okpala Junction attack, terrorist attack in Ngor Okpala LGA, Imo State, Nigeria in 2023
