= Allison Precious Emmanuel =

Nigerian actor and filmmaker

- Born: Allison Precious Emmanuel; November 10, 2001 (age 24)
- Known for: Filmmaking
- Notable work: Hijack '93, The Boy Who Gave

Allison Precious Emmanuel is a Nigerian actor, director, screenwriter, and filmmaker. He is best known as the youngest filmmaker to premiere a feature film, The Boy Who Gave, in Nigerian cinemas, and for his portrayal of Ben “Owiwi” in the 2024 Netflix film Hijack ‘93. He is also the youngest triple nominee in the history of the Africa International Film Festival (AFRIFF).

== Early life ==
Allison was born on November 10, 2001 in Bonny Island, Rivers State, where his film The Boy Who Gave was shot. He studied Information Management at the Rivers State University.

== Career ==
At 21, Allison won the maiden edition of SDGs Short Film Challenge and Awards with his film, Daddy Lessons taking home a 1 million Naira cash prize. In 2024, he gained recognition after starring alongside Nnamdi Agbo, Sam Dede, and more as Ben “Owiwi” in the Robert O. Peters-directed disaster film, Hijack ‘93, based on the 1993 Nigerian Airways hijack.

In November 2025, Allison screened his first feature film The Boy Who Gave at the Africa International Film Festival (AFRIFF). He starred in, wrote and directed the film, and made history as the youngest triple nominee in the history of the festival earning Best Actor, Best Director, and Best Film nominations. The film stars Tina Mba, Blossom Chukwujekwu, and Chuks Joseph. At age 24, Allison became the youngest filmmaker to premiere a feature film in Nigerian cinemas after the film was officially released in May 2026.

Allison was listed alongside Uzoamaka Power and Martha Ehinome in YNaija’s list of 8 Nollywood Breakout Stars to watch out for in 2026.

== Filmography ==
- The Boy Who Gave (2025)
- Hijack ’93 (2024)
- Dead of Night (2024)
- Masquerades of Aniedo (TV Series 2023–2024)
