= 2020 Africa Magic Viewers' Choice Awards =

2020 Africa Magic Viewers Choice Awards

7th Africa Magic Viewers' Choice Awards
- Date: 14 March 2020
- Site: Eko Hotel and Suites, Lagos, Nigeria
- Hosted by: IK Osakioduwa, Amina Abdi Rabar

Highlights
- Best Actor: Timini Egbuson
- Best Actress: Toyin Abraham
- Most awards: Living in Bondage: Breaking Free (11)

The 2020 Africa Magic Viewers' Choice Awards were held on March 14, 2020 at Eko Hotel and Suites, Lagos.

The nominees were revealed on February 6, 2020. There were 28 categories and seven of those categories were open to public voting. 21 of the categories were decided by the AMVCA panel of judges. The MultiChoice Talent Factory Award was included as a new category.

== Awards ==
Nominees are listed below. All winners are highlighted in boldface.

Best Supporting Actress in a Movie or TV Series	Best Actress in a Comedy (Movie/TV Series)
**Gloria Sarfo - The Perfect Picture: 10 Years Later**; Toni Tones - King Of Boys; Eucharia Anunobi - The Foreigner's God; Tina Mba - The Set Up; Mary Lazarus - Size 12	'**Funke Akindele - Moms At War'**; Toyin Abraham - Bling Lagosians; Bimbo Ademoye - Looking For Baami; Toyin Abraham - Kasanova; Ebele Okaro - Smash
Best Supporting Actor in a Movie or TV Series	Best Actor in a Drama (Movie/TV Series)
**Pascal Tokodi - Disconnect**; Damilo (Rmd) seven Richard Mofe; Ramsey Nouah - Living in Bondage: Breaking Free; Nkem Owoh - God Calling; Remilekun 'Reminisce' Safaru - King Of Boys	**Timini Egbuson - Elevator Baby**; Swankey J.K.A - Living In Bondage'; Efa Iwara - Seven; Gabriel Afolayan - Coming From Insanity; Ramsey Nouah - Levi
Best Short Film or Online Video	Best Actress in a Drama (Movie/TV Series)
**Thorn - Bola 'Enigma' Akanbi**; Oga John - Bolanle Akintomide; Prueba - Stanlee Ohikuhare; Tokunbo - Bio Arimoro	'**Toyin Abraham - Elevator Baby**; Shola Shobowale - King Of Boys; Zainab Balogun - Sylvia; Zainab Balogun - God Calling; Kate Henshaw - The Ghost And The House Of Truth
Best Actor in a Comedy (Movie or TV Series)	Best Indigenous Language Movie/TV Series Hausa
**Chibunna "Funny Bone" Stanley - Smash**; Uzor Arukwe - Smash; Uzor Arukwe - Size 12; Ramsey Nouah - Merry Men 1; Daniel Etim Effiong - Plan B	**Tuntube - Muhammad T. Finisher**; Mariya - Abubakar Bashir; Abarawa Rai - Muhammad Adam and Tundun Murtala; Sadauki - Hassan Giggs
Best Director	Best Indigenous Language Movie/TV Series Igbo
**Living in Bondage: Breaking Free - Steve Gukas, Ramsey Nouah**; God Calling - Bb Sasore; The Set Up - Niyi Akinmolayan; King Of Boys - Kemi Adetiba; Ratnik - Dimeji Ajibola; The Ghost And The House Of Truth - Akin Omotosho; Seven - Tosin Igho	**Nne - Victor Iyke**; *Isianyaocha - Brown Ene; Nekwa - Paul Igwe; Obiakpor - Evan Okechukwu
Best Indigenous Language Movie/TV Series Swahili	Best Television Series Drama Or Comedy
**Raveet Sippy Chadh - Subira**; Timoth Conrad Kachumka - Sema; Victor Gatonye - Dream Child; Joan Kabugu - Toy Car	**Truth - Anis Halloway**; Jenifa's Diary - Funke Akindele; Life As It Is - Uche Odoh; Women - Uchenna Mbunabo
Best Sound Track Movie/TV Series	Best Make-Up Category
**Living in Bondage: Breaking Free - Larry Gaaga & Flavour - Tene**; King Of Boys - Sess, Reminisce & Adekunle Gold - Original Gangster; God Calling - Ighwiyisi Jacobs - Stay With Me; The Gift - Mercy Aghedo - The Gift; Run -Timzil - Run	**God Calling - Lilian Omozele Paul**; The Foreigner's God - Jude Odoh; King Of Boys - Hakeem Effects; Coming From Insanity - Bio Arimoro
Best Sound Editor	Best Documentary
**Christina Aragon Living in Bondage: Breaking Free**; Bernie Anti In My Country; Kolade Morakinyo Up North; Michael 'Truth' Ogunlade Three thieves; Tosin Igho Seven; Willis Abuto & Kevin Abuto Poker	**Skin - Beverly Naya**; Hidden Euphoria - Aderogba Adedeji; Against All Odds: A Tale Of Resilience - Aderemi Davies; Ibadan: Yoruba Heritage - Tunde Oladimeji
Best Lighting Designer in a Movie or TV Series	Best Movie Southern Africa
**God Calling - Cardoso**; Ratnik - Abiola Ladipo; Elevator Baby - Eleaxu Texas; Plan B - Odhiambo Walter	**Dalitso - Abraham Kabwe**; Kukuri (film) - Philippe Talavera; Kwacha - Cassie Kabwita; The Beautiful Hen Behind Yao Mountain - Imran Kaisi
Best Art Director Movie/TV Series	Best Costume Designer Movie or TV Series
**Ratnik - Dimeji Ajibola, Iwaotan Olusola Roberts**; Living in Bondage: Breaking Free - Victor Afrigold, Ayanda Carter, Jim Franklin, Zimasa Ndamase; God Calling - Omotola Alade; The Bling Lagosians - Bolanle Austen Peters	**Ratnik Dimeji Ajibola**; Living in Bondage: Breaking Free Olohigbe Nwagwu; The Foreigner's God Ifan Michael; King Of Boys Yolanda Okereke
Best Indigenous Language Movie/TV Series Yoruba	Best Cinematographer
**Yewande Famakin - Alubarika**; Ronke Odusanya - Ajoji Godogbo; Oyebade Adebimpe - Adebimpe Omo Oba; Wumi Olabimtan - Intent	**Living in Bondage: Breaking Free - John Demps**; God Calling - Cardoso; Ratnik - Niyi White, Gbenga Fifolabi and Abiola Ladipo; The Set Up - Mohammed Attah
Best Picture Editor	Best Writer in a Movie or TV Series
**Seven - Tosin Igho and Bryan Dike**; God Calling - Holmes Awa; Ratnik - Dimeji Ajibola; Living in Bondage: Breaking Free - Antonio Rebeiro; Elevator Baby - Emiola Fagbenle	**Nicole Asinugo and CJ Obasi - Living in Bondage: Breaking Free**; BB Sasore - God Calling; Tosin Igho - Seven; Vanessa Kanu - Sylvia; Biodun Stephen - Joba; Akay Mason and Yusuf Carew - Elevator Baby
Best Movie East Africa	Best Movie West Africa)
**Plan B - Sarah Hassan**; Disconnect - Iman Mueke; Lost In Time - Edijoe Mwaniki; 94 Terror - Mulinwa Richard	**Living in Bondage: Breaking Free - Steve Gukas**; God Calling - Momo Spaine; Seven - Tosin Igho; Elevator Baby - Victoria Akujobi; Ratnik - Dimeji Ajibola
MultiChoice Academy award	Trailblazer
**Promises – East Africa**; Life of Bim – West Africa; Dreamchaser – West Africa; Ensulo – East Africa; Savana Skies – Southern Africa; The Painting – Southern Africa	**Swanky JKA (Living in Bondage: Breaking Free)**
