= Ochicha =

Village in Imo State, Nigeria

Ochicha Obike
- Village
- Location in Nigeria
- Coordinates: 5.5841°N 7.1386°E
- Country: Nigeria
- State: Imo State
- Local Government Area: Ngor Okpala
- Time zone: UTC+1 (WAT)
- Climate: Aw

Ochicha // Obike is one of the eight villages within the town of Obike, located in Ngor Okpala Local Government Area of Imo State, Nigeria.

The name "Ochicha" has been misunderstood by some, with non-natives often associating it with the word "cockroach." In the Igbo language, however, the meaning of words can vary significantly depending on tonal inflection. When pronounced "Ochicha" (low, high, mid tones), it may indeed mean "cockroach," but pronounced "Ochicha" (low, high, high tones), it translates as "purity." As such, the village name is generally interpreted to mean "purity" in its context.

A notable event in the village's history occurred on 20 September 1992, when the community reportedly shifted its spiritual focus from traditional practices to a religious transformation. This change, described in religious terms, was a turning point in the community's approach to local issues and spirituality.

Earlier in September 1992, an alarming period of unexplained deaths led to a significant gathering of villagers at the Nkwo-Ala Ochicha market square. The village crier's message, delivered on the morning of 7 September, prompted the community to assemble, concerned about the unusual circumstances they were facing.

The village also has a history of conflict related to the sacred Nkwoahiadike market day. A dispute with the neighboring village of Umueme escalated when a man from Umueme was killed on the sacred Nkwo day. In response, Ochicha presented a man as a sacrificial substitute in an attempt to placate the Nkwoahiadike deity, a practice referred to as "Ikenye Madu." The sacrifice took place at the market square, with the individual's blood offered at the deity's shrine.
