= Cheta'm =

Nigerian TV series

- Also known as: Cheta M
- Genre: Telenovela
- Written by: Ifeanyi Barbara Chidi (HW.); TigerFireRose; Mary Nsikanabasi Uyoh; Umm'Salma Saliu; Uchenna Ugwu; Chisom Nwobu; Oluwapemi Olujoba Bifarin; Lucky Igbomor; Amaka Okemadu; Fatimah Binta Gimsay; Abdul Tijani-Ahmed; Owumi Ugbeye; Kuchi Chris; Ogechi Nwobi Eke
- Directed by: James Omokwe; Usman Ogunlade; David Gee Ahanmisi; Ben Chiadika; Lota Chukwu; Charles Obi Emere
- Starring: Oluchi Amajuoyi; Kingsley Nwachukwu; Ruby Okezie; Kalu Ikeagwu; Nonso Odogwu; Nnamdi Agbo; Jsmile Uhuru; Lulu Okonkwo; Oma Nnadi; Valerie Odunukwe; Ugonna Okore
- Theme music composer: Chubb Okobah
- Country of origin: Nigeria
- Original languages: English; Igbo
- No. of seasons: 2
- No. of episodes: 96

Production
- Executive producer: James Omokwe
- Editors: Abdul Tijani-Ahmed; Owumi Ugbeye
- Running time: 25 - 30 minutes
- Production company: Feemo

Original release
- Network: Showmax
- Release: 9 February 2024 – present

Cheta'm is a 2024 Showmax original Nigerian telenovela, executive produced by James Omokwe and written by Ifeanyi Barbara Chidi. It stars Oluchi Amajuoyi, Kingsley Nwachukwu, Ruby Okezie, Kalu Ikeagwu, Nonso Odogwu, Nnamdi Agbo, Jsmile Uhuru, Lulu Okonkwo, Oma Nnadi, Valerie Odunukwe, and Ugonna Okore.

== Plot ==
Cheta'm revolves around Adanna and Nnanna, who found a once-in-a-lifetime kind of love and fought against all odds to stay together.

== Cast ==
=== Main ===
- Oluchi Amajuoyi as Adanna
- Kingsley Nwachukwu as Nnanna
- Nnamdi Agbo as Nwoye
- Kalu Ikeagwu as Jideofor
- Valerie Odunukwe as Kamharida
- Nonso Odogwu as Ezeugo
- Ruby Okezie as Mmesomma
- Jsmile Uhuru as Ojigijaga or Anele
- Lulu Okonkwo as Ugomma (forest being or goddess)
- Ugonna Okore as Mkpulumma
- Oma Nnadi as Mmadiya

=== Top Supporting ===
- Phildaniels Aniedo as Okwuchelu
- Obey Etok as Akunna
- Dan Ugoji as Ejike
- Floyd Igbo as Onochie
- Kelvin Ekeng as Chetanna
- Sunny Mcdon as Obumneme
- Emma Umeh as Olisaeloka
- Morgan Nwamba as Nwoke
- Oluchi Odii as Ahunna
- Alex Lucky as Onwuchekwa
- Tracy George as Ndidi
- Amaka Ezeamaka as Mmaegwu
- Princess Obichi Marshall as Ofunneka
- Bryan Okoye as Ikemefuna
- Chiquita Ezenwa as Ijeawele
- Chibuike Casmir as Ikenna
- Amarachukwu Onoh as Bianoyerem
- Chisom Ogbudimkpa as Akuada
- Gregory Chiadika as Okeke
- Achy Jeffery as Kaodinakachi
- Sidney Ekwulugo as Nzeribe
- Ichie Fuego as Azubuike
- Chinaza Clara Ezeani as Urenna
- Treasure Chikwendu as Ujunwa
- Ginikachukwu Tagbo as Obiajulu
- Nonso Afolabi as Udu
- Chigozie Atuanya as Maduka
- Michael Uchegbu as Dike

=== Supporting ===
- Etta Jomaria as Lolia
- Amanda Ugoh as Adaolisa
- Charles Obah as Jidekene
- Joy Chioma Obilor as Arunma
- Romanus Chikanma as Chimdi
- Posh Owoniyi as Young Ujunwa
- Sapphire Ekeng as Young Urenna
- Kosi Ogboruche as Young Obiajulu

== Episodes ==
Each episode is released three times weekly from Wednesday to Friday on Showmax.

Season	Episodes	Originally released	
Season	Episodes	First released	Last released
1	60	February 9, 2024	June 21, 2024
2	36	January 6, 2025	TBA

=== Season 1 (2024) ===
No.	Title	Original release date
1	TBA	9 February 2024
Welcome to Mgberi. Two lovers must fight spiritual and other forces that are against them being together.
2	TBA	9 February 2024
New love, old foes. Nnanna maintains his suspicions. Onochie fails to impress his father, and Mgberi is on the brink of war.
3	TBA	9 February 2024
Nnanna makes a bold move, and Mmesoma burns with jealousy. The women of Mgberi shut down the kingdom.
4	TBA	14 February 2024
Mmesoma convinces Adanna to be a decent woman. Nnanna volunteers at the inner council.
5	TBA	15 February 2024
Nnanna helps the inner council, and Adanna has another dream. War has come to Mgberi.
6	TBA	16 February 2024
The women of Mgberi stand together to stop Jideofor's invasion as Ikemefuna makes a bold move. Mgberi experiences an important reunion.
7	TBA	21 February 2024
Tensions heat up in the fall out of Ajaani's invasion. Love blooms even in the chaos, and someone returns victorious.
8	TBA	22 February 2024
Ezeugo is made an offer, Mothers continue to scheme and sisters declare threats of marriage.
9	TBA	23 February 2024
Shooting love shots, and a hope of new alliances.
10	TBA	28 February 2024
Mmadiya wants her sons to marry from Ajaani. Adanna and Nnanna share an experience.
11	TBA	29 February 2024
The tree blooms. Ojigijaga confides in friends, and Adanna has another dream.
12	TBA	1 March 2024
Doom hovers over Chimdi and Arunma. Adanna is tormented by a dark secret, and Jideofor meets Ezeugo's sons.
13	TBA	6 March 2024
The explorers of Mgberi are dismissed unceremoniously. Adanna's revelations terrify Mmesoma, and Ojigijaga swears to defy the gods.
14	TBA	7 March 2024
Ezeugo is once again faced with another impossible decision in trying to save Mgberi from Jideofor's wrath.
15	TBA	8 March 2024
Nwoye faces betrayal from Adanna and Nnanna, Akuada accepts an offer she should refuse.
16	TBA	13 March 2024
Nnanna deals with the fall out of Nwoye's rejected proposal. Adanna and Mmesoma have a narrow escape.
17	TBA	14 March 2024
Wahala is ready for the race preserving love, saving friendship, and securing a marriage at all costs.
18	TBA	15 March 2024
Ezeugo consults the Ezenmuo. Akuada reveals the reason for her actions.
19	TBA	20 March 2024
A council meeting is held to sieve out the spies. Ahunna is impatient for what is hers, and Nwoye prepares to leave.
20	TBA	21 March 2024
Nwoye leaves Mgberi, Adanna and Nnanna face a surprising new revelation.
21	TBA	22 March 2024
Arunma gets a new position, and Ijeawele confesses. Ejike faces the King of Ajaani.
22	TBA	27 March 2024
Nnanna refuses to give up on Adanna. Ojigijaga remains steadfast in his demand, and Nwoye is protected by the gods.
23	TBA	28 March 2024
Onochie's plans are on the brink of failure. Nnanna's plot to get Adanna back fails, and Bianoyerem finds a way to get the woman of his dreams.
24	TBA	29 March 2024
Friendships are put to the test in the light of the latest disruption in Mgberi.
25	TBA	3 April 2024
Adanna and Nnanna make a choice. Jideofor has a conversation with Kamharida, and Jidekene bites off more than he can chew.
26	TBA	4 April 2024
Adanna goes on an adventure. Ugomma does a masterclass in power, and the hunters face the aftermath.
27	TBA	5 April 2024
Adanna and Nnanna's families deal with the aftermath of their escape. Jidekene is found, and Ezeugo is convinced Kamharida has been unfaithful.
28	TBA	10 April 2024
A marriage proposal is procured and the betrayal of a close friend is afoot. Azubuike's problems intensify.
29	TBA	11 April 2024
The consequences of Adanna and Nnanna's love come to rest at their door. Mkpulumma and Ahunna are running out of time, and Onochie steps up in the midst of chaos.
30	TBA	12 April 2024
Adanna and Nnanna face a crisis, Ejike fights to prove himself worthy.
31	TBA	17 April 2024
32	TBA	18 April 2024
33	TBA	19 April 2024
34	TBA	24 April 2024
35	TBA	25 April 2024
36	TBA	26 April 2024
37	TBA	1 May 2024
38	TBA	2 May 2024
39	TBA	3 May 2024
40	TBA	8 May 2024
41	TBA	9 May 2024
42	TBA	10 May 2024
43	TBA	15 May 2024
44	TBA	16 May 2024
45	TBA	17 May 2024
46	TBA	22 May 2024
47	TBA	23 May 2024
48	TBA	24 May 2024
49	TBA	29 May 2024
50	TBA	30 May 2024
51	TBA	31 May 2024
52	TBA	5 June 2024
53	TBA	6 June 2024
54	TBA	7 June 2024
55	TBA	12 June 2024
56	TBA	13 June 2024
57	TBA	14 June 2024
58	TBA	19 June 2024
59	TBA	20 June 2024
60	TBA	21 June 2024

=== Season 2 (2025) ===
No.	Title	Original release date
1	TBA	6 January 2025
The Killer in Ezeugo's household confesses. Fortune smiles on the hunters of the Ezenmuo.
2	TBA	7 January 2025
Mmadiya takes a bow. Mkpulumma reveals Jideofor's true intentions to him.
3	TBA	8 January 2025
Mgberi cool kids reunite. Adaolisa mourns her friend. Obiajulu seeks answers.
4	TBA	13 January 2025
Nnanna and Chetanna enjoy some bonding time. Lolia ends things with Boma and there are consequences. Adanna has a new dream.
5	TBA	14 January 2025
Adanna gives Nnanna advice, Akuade and Udu battle for supremacy.
6	TBA	15 January 2025
Ezeugo's compound stinks of shame. Azubuike is getting an assistant. Akuada confesses on repeat.
7	TBA	20 January 2025
Mkpulumma and Jideofor learn new information they despise, Nnanna has something fishy up his sleeve.
8	TBA	21 January 2025
Urenna targets Nwoye's intended, Adanna for friendship. Ijeawele's heart is torn between her past and her present.
9	TBA	22 January 2025
Nwoye realizes Adanna's forgetfulness is real. Mkpulumma gets an answer that increases her fears.
10	TBA	27 January 2025
Adanna and Nnanna's family reunion goes unnoticed, Ejike is attacked, and Akuada experiences final heartbreak.
11	TBA	28 January 2025
Ejike and Ahunna discuss the attack. Nnanna gives Adanna a gift. Ujunwa has an experience with Obiajulu.
12	TBA	29 January 2025
Ezeugo and his sons become more suspicious of the Ajaani visitors. Ikemefuna picks a new bride and Mmesoma makes a bold move.
13	TBA	3 February 2025
Azubuike discovers the true level of Nnanna's impact on his wife. Nwoke says a final no to Nwoye and Ahunna makes a bold move.
14	TBA	4 February 2025
Mkpulumma sends Jideofor on a mission. Ezeugo and his household prepare for a wedding. Nnanna says his goodbyes.
15	TBA	5 February 2025
Mgberi faces its toughest battle yet.
16	TBA	10 February 2025
Mgberi mourns for the lives lost. Chetanna finds safe haven and Nnanna faces the music for his defiance.
17	TBA	11 February 2025
Mgberi kingdom continues to mourn their loss, Ofunneka takes a bold stance and Jideofor offers Nwoye a deal.
18	TBA	12 February 2025
The search for Chetanna continues and Obiajulu declares independence in the shrine.
19	TBA	17 February 2025
Kamharida is given an impossible choice. Ofunneka must live with her mistakes. A new Ezenmuo is named.
20	TBA	18 February 2025
Adanna and Nnanna mourn their fathers. Mgberi mourns as Kamharida marries Jideofor.
21	TBA	19 February 2025
Mkpulumma tells Ojigijaga a secret. Kamharida seeks new friends. Nwoye tests his new found power.
22	TBA	24 February 2025
Mkpulumma has a task for Ojigijaga. Ahunna confronts Jideofor. The search for Chetanna continues.
23	TBA	25 February 2025
The search for Chetanna leads Nnanna to a prophecy. A friendship ends as old animosity rears its head.
24	TBA	26 February 2025
Ahunna and Nwoye hash it out. Adanna meets Jideofor. Ojigijaga prepares to be JIdeofor.
25	TBA	3 March 2025
Adanna and Mmesoma end things. Nwoye tries the unthinkable with Jideofor.
26	TBA	4 March 2025
Nwoye impresses the king. Kamharida is bewitched into killing Jideofor but she fails her mission.
27	TBA	5 March 2025
Kamharida struggles under the full weight of Mkpulumma's powers. Mmesoma and Nzeribe reconcile. Mkpulumma rallies the troops in Ajaani.
28	TBA	10 March 2025
Mkpulumma reigns in Ajaani. Ujunwa and Urenna make up. Adanna and Nnanna receive a gift.
29	TBA	11 March 2025
Love builds and despair escalates as the people of Mgberi aim for alternate outcomes, will they succeed?
30	TBA	12 March 2025
Adanna and Nnanna grow closer, Ofunneka confesses an awful truth, Ojigijaga plans a coup.
31	TBA	17 March 2025
Ahunna and Lolia form an unlikely friendship. Nnanna moves shady and a new character takes up space.
32	TBA	18 March 2025
Jideofor confides in Nnanna. Udu takes steps to ensure the past does not repeat itself. Mmadiya sends an enemy to the gods.
33	TBA	19 March 2025
Urenna is put on the spot for choosing the wrong side. Mmadiya expresses her disappointment in Obiajulu. Kamharida is in big trouble.
34	TBA	24 March 2025
Jideofor struggles with Kamharida's poisoning as he fishes for the culprit. Ojigijaga makes another attempt to secure what he needs.
35	TBA	25 March 2025
Nnanna gets a proposition from Adanna's mothers. Ojigijaga gets what he wants.
36	TBA	26 March 2025
37	TBA	31 March 2025
38	TBA	1 April 2025
39	TBA	2 April 2025
40	TBA	7 April 2025
41	TBA	8 April 2025
42	TBA	9 April 2025

== Production ==
=== Casting ===
The cast was announced by Showmax before releasing the first season, with a line-up of Oluchi Amajuoyi, Kingsley Nwachukwu, Ruby Okezie, Kalu Ikeagwu, Nonso Odogwu, Nnamdi Agbo, Jsmile Uhuru, Valerie Odunukwe, Lulu Okonkwo, Oma Nnadi, Phildaniels Aniedo, Obey Etok, Dan Ugoji, Floyd Igbo, Sunny Mcdon, Emma Umeh, Morgan Nwamba, Oluchi Odii, Alex Lucky, Tracy George, Amaka Ezeamaka, Princess Obichi Marshall, Chisom Ogbudimkpa, Chigozie Atuanya, Michael Uchegbu, Charles Obah, Gregory Chiadika, Achu Jeffery, Sidney Ekwulugo, Ichie Fuego, Joy Chioma Obilor, Romanus Chikanma, Posh Owoniyi, Sapphire Ekeng, and Kosi Ogboruche.

=== Filming ===
On 1 February 2023, Busola Tejumola, the executive head of content and West Africa channels at MultiChoice, stated in a press conference held in Lagos that Cheta'm consists of 130 episodes.

== Premiere and release ==
On 9 February 2024, Showmax premiered the series ahead of the launch of the new Showmax 2.0 which was activated on 12 February 2024. On 14 December 2024, Showmax announced a release date of 6 January 2025 for Season 2.

=== Broadcast history ===
The TV series premiered on 7 June 2024, on Africa Magic Showcase.
