= Dinner (film) =

2016 Nigerian film

- Directed by: Jay Franklyn Jituboh
- Written by: Jay Franklyn Jituboh
- Produced by: Jay Franklyn Jituboh; Chris Odeh
- Starring: Okey Uzoeshi; Keira; Enyinna Nwigwe
- Cinematography: Muhammad Atta Ahmed
- Edited by: Jeje Moroko
- Music by: Ibk Spaceshipboi
- Production company: 567 Entertainment
- Release date: 2016
- Running time: 110 minutes
- Country: Nigeria
- Language: English
- Budget: $105,000 (estimated)
- Box office: FilmOne Distribution

Dinner is a 2016 Nigerian comedy film that is all about love, betrayal and forgiveness. It was produced by Jay Franklyn Jituboh and Chris Odeh. The executive producer of the film is David Jituboh. It was released on November 11, 2016 and premiered at IMAX Cinema in Lekki. The premier of Dinner was sponsored by Amstel Malta and attended by celebrities in the movie industry. The movie received mixed criticism, although its performances were praised.

== Plot ==
Adetunde George Jnr invited his bosom friend, Mike Okafor to his place to spend the weekend with him and his fiancée Lola Coker who is staying with him to plan for their wedding. Mike Okafor also brought along his girlfriend Diane Bassey to propose to her. Things went south when secrets about their relationship are leaked.

== Cast ==
- Okey Uzoeshi as Mike Okafor
- Enyinna Nwigwe as Adetunde George Jnr
- Kehinde Bankole as Lola Coker
- Keira Hewatch as Diane Bassey
- Deyemi Okanlawon as Richard 'Richie' Boyo
- Richard Mofe-Damijo as Adetunde George Snr.
- Ini Dima Okojie as Jane Odogu
- Olaide Bolaji as Sarah
- Charles Inojie as Airport Guard
- Esther Audu as Lady at the Airport
- Ruby Nwosu as Richie's Girl in Bed
- Chima Precious as Police Officer 1
- Yinka Adeseun as Police Officer 2
- Dare Sorinwa as Ade's Driver
- Ireti Doyle as Elizabeth A. George.

== See also ==
- List of Nigerian actors
- Beyond blood
- Blood sisters (2022 series)
