= Okpala Junction attack =

2023 attach in Imo State, Nigeria

- Part of Insurgency in Southeastern Nigeria
- Location: Okpala Junction, Ngor Okpala LGA, Imo State, Nigeria
- Date: April 21, 2023
- Target: Policemen
- Deaths: 7: 5 policemen; 2 civilians
- Perpetrator: Unknown: IPOB (per Imo State police)

On April 21, 2023, five policemen and two civilians were killed by alleged IPOB gunmen near the Okpala Junction in Ngor Okpala LGA, Imo State, Nigeria. Following the attack, Imo State police drew controversy after parading an alleged attacker around that turned out to have already been in police custody.

== Background ==
Throughout 2023, Imo State has been the location of several small attacks against community leaders, officials, and civilians by bandit groups and alleged Indigenous People of Biafra (IPOB) militants. In March, three officers from the Nigeria Security and Civil Defence Corps were killed in an ambush in Obiangwu, and several days prior to the Okpala Junction attack police inspector Augustine Ukaegbu was assassinated.

== Attack ==
At the time of the attack, cops at the nearby Abo Mbaise police station drove down to Okpala Junction to eat at a restaurant. While there, gunmen pulled up and shot, killing three on the spot. The two surviving officers ran into a local shop, where the gunmen followed them and killed them, along with the couple that owned the shop. The couple was identified as Mr. and Mrs. Chinaka Nwagu.

On April 30, the Imo State Police Command released a statement claiming that nine IPOB militants had been arrested in connection with the Okpala Junction attack. The officials stated that they had tracked down several suspects and arrested them, and that the suspects confessed to being IPOB commanders. On May 9, one of the alleged militants, Thaddeus Ikechukwu Ojokoh, a 53 year old tailor, turned out to have already been in police custody for a different crime at the time of the attack, having been arrested on April 15. Despite this, he was paraded by the police as a suspect, drawing uproar and forcing a police investigation. Civil society organizations in Imo State petitioned for greater transparency within police command and stated that torture and deprivation of communication was common.
