= Dead Expensive =

2021 Nigerian film

- Directed by: Aniedi Awah Noba
- Produced by: Isioma Muller
- Starring: Sola Sobowale, Charles Inojie and Ime Bishop
- Release date: 2021
- Country: Nigeria
- Language: English

Dead Expensive is a 2021 Nigeria comedic movie produced by Isioma Muller and directed by Aniedi Awah Noba. The movie, which challenges the archaic practices of Africans on celebrating the dead over the living, stars Sola Sobowale, Charles Inojie and Ime Bishop.

== Synopsis ==
After the demise of a rich man, his children had to battle with the family who hide behind African customary and traditional way of sharing property and caring for the dead that makes life unbearable for the living.

== Premiere ==
The movie was first premiered at the Oriental Hotel, Lagos on Sunday, May 9, 2021, before it was released to cinemas nationwide on May 14. The premiering was witnessed by celebrities such as Ime Bishop (Okon Lagos), Melvin Oduah, Bolaji Ogunmola, Bryan Okwara, Mawuli Gavor, Djinee and Juliet Ibrahim.

== Cast ==
- Sola Sobowale
- Charles Inojie
- Ime Bishop (Okon Lagos)
- Melvin Oduah,
- Bolaji Ogunmola,
- Charles Maduka
- Frank John
