= Chris Odeh =

Nigerian film producer

- Citizenship: Nigeria
- Occupations: Actor, Film director, Film producer

Chris Odeh is a Nigerian film producer and film maker.

== Film career ==
Odeh started his career on TV working on two seasons of Moments with Mo for Mo Abudu. He went on to work on movies such as Oloibiri, Rattlesnake: The Ahanna Story, Aki and Pawpaw, Living in Bondage: Breaking Free and Nneka the Pretty Serpent. His works have won awards and received nominations from the AMVCA, Africa Movie Academy Awards, and Africa International Film Festival.

He is the senior producer of Sozo Films.

In May 2026, the Association of Movie Producers (AMP) Nigeria suspended Odeh following petitions concerning the alleged misappropriation of ₦180 million intended to finance three film productions. According to AMP, Odeh acknowledged the matter during a disciplinary hearing and agreed to repay the funds. The association subsequently suspended him after a ₦60 million cheque issued as part of the repayment arrangement reportedly failed to clear.

== Filmography ==
- Dinner (2016)
- Nneka the Pretty Serpent (2020)
- Rattlesnake: The Ahanna Story (2020)
- Aki and Pawpaw (2021)
- Love Lust and Other Things (2023)
- Choke (2022)

== Awards and nominations ==
| Award | Work | Category | Result | Reference |
|---|---|---|---|---|
| 2023 Africa Magic Viewers' Choice Awards | Choke | Best Movie West Africa | Nominated | |
| 2022 Africa Magic Viewers' Choice Awards | Rattlesnake: The Ahanna Story | Best Overall Movie | Nominated | |
| 2022 Africa Magic Viewers' Choice Awards | Nneka the Pretty Serpent | Best Overall Movie | Nominated | |
| 2022 Africa Magic Viewers' Choice Awards | Rattlesnake: The Ahanna Story | Best Movie West Africa | Nominated | |
| 2022 Africa Magic Viewers' Choice Awards | Nneka the Pretty Serpent | Best Movie West Africa | Nominated | |
| 2021 Best of Nollywood Awards | Rattlesnake: The Ahanna Story | Best Cinematography | Won | |
| 2021 Best of Nollywood Awards | Rattlesnake: The Ahanna Story | Best Editing | Won | |
