= Screen Writers Guild of Nigeria =

Film industry association

Screenwriters Guild of Nigeria (SWGN) is an association that exists to oversee the affairs of Nollywood screenwriters, as well as protect their interests. They also organise screenwriting competitions for up-and-coming screenwriters in the industry. Writers like Ekenna Igwe (Inaugural President), Tony Anih, Chike Bryan and Charles Inojie have served as the guild's former Presidents. Yinka Ogun serves as its current President.
