= Enyinna Nwigwe =

Nigerian actor

Chief Enyinna Nwigwe
- Born: 18 September 1982 (age 44); Ngor Okpala, Nigeria
- Citizenship: Nigerian
- Education: Economics, University of Calabar
- Alma mater: University of Calabar
- Occupations: Actor; film producer; entrepreneur
- Years active: 2005 — present
- Notable work: Games Men Play; The Wedding Party 2

Chief Enyinna Nwigwe // (born 18 September 1982) is a Nigerian actor, producer, and entrepreneur. He is best known for playing Nonso in The Wedding Party 2 and Tamuno in Black November.

== Early life and education ==
Nwigwe was born on 18 September 1982, and raised in Obiangwu, Ngor Okpala, in Imo State to Nigerian parents. He studied at the University of Calabar, in Cross River State, Nigeria and holds a degree in economics.

== Career ==
Nwigwe began his career as a print and runway model before transitioning to professional acting.

His first feature was in the 2004 film Wheel of Change.

In 2012, he joined the cast of Black November opposite Kim Basinger, Vivica A. Fox, Akon, and Wyclef Jean. In 2017, he played the lead role in the South African movie, All About Love which won the best film, Southern Africa, at the AMVCA. In 2019, Nwigwe played the role of Obinna Omego in the remake of the Nigerian film, Living in Bondage: Breaking Free, and also played the role of Nura Yusuf in Nigeria's first military-based film, Eagle Wings. Nwigwe also played the lead in Badamasi, a biopic on the former military President of Nigeria. He got the Best Actor in a Leading Role nomination at the Africa Movie Academy Awards, for his portrayal of President Ibrahim Badamasi Babangida in the film.

Nwigwe's portrait by Nigerian-American photographer Iké Udé was selected to permanently be on exhibition at the Smithsonian Institution's National Museum of African Art.

== Personal life ==
Nwigwe lives in Lagos State, southwestern Nigeria. He is a Nigerian Chief.

== Filmography ==
=== Film ===
Year	Title	Role	Notes
2005	Wheel of Change	Tony	
2005	Last Game	Gubabi	
2006	Games Men Play	Attorney	
2006	The Amazing Grace	Etukudo, Associate Producer	
2011	Black Gold	Tamuno, Co-producer	
2012	Turning Point	Steve	
2012	Black November	Tamuno Alaibe, Associate Producer	
2015	Silver Rain	Bruce	
2015	Love Struck	Actor	TV movie
2016	Put a Ring on It	Robert	
2016	Hell or High Water	Actor	Short Film
2016	When Love Happens Again	Enyinna	
2016	Dinner	Adetunde George Jnr.	
2016	The Wedding Party	Nonso Onwuka	
2017	Hire A Man	Jeff	
2017	Red Code	Charles	
2017	Atlas	Osas	
2017	The Wedding Party 2	Nonso	
2018	Bound	Elochukwu	
2019	Living in Bondage: Breaking Free	Obinna Omego	
2019	Cold Feet	Tare	
2020	Dear Affy	Micheal	
2020	Badamasi	Ibrahim Babangida	
2021	Eagle Wings	Nura Yusuf	
2021	The Silent Baron	Anselm	
2022	Love Trap	Young Stephen Tanui	Romance
2023	Teni's Big Day	Jeff	Romance
2023	What No One Knows	Efosa Akenuwa	Drama

=== Television ===
Year	Title	Role	Notes
2008	Mary Slessor	Prince, Producer	
2023	Pyramid Nigeria	Host	

== Awards and nominations ==
Year	Award	Category	Film	Result	Ref
2015	Nollywood and African Film Critics Award	Best Actor in a Supporting Role	Black November	Nominated	
2016	City People Entertainment Awards	Best Supporting Actor of the Year (English)		Nominated	
2020	Africa Movie Academy Awards	Best Actor in a Leading Role	Badamasi	Nominated	
2020	Best of Nollywood Awards	Best Actor in a Lead role – English	Dear Affy	Nominated	
2021	Best of Nollywood Awards	Best Actor in a Lead role – English	Badamasi	Nominated	
2022	Africa Magic Viewers' Choice Awards	Best Actor in A Drama	Dear Affy	Nominated	
