= Samuel Ajibola =

Nigerian actor

- Born: December 26th Nigeria
- Education: University of Lagos (B.Sc), Ajayi Crowther University (M.PA)
- Occupations: Actor and Producer
- Years active: 1995–2003, 2009–present
- Known for: The Johnsons Dele Issues
- Website: samuelajibola.com

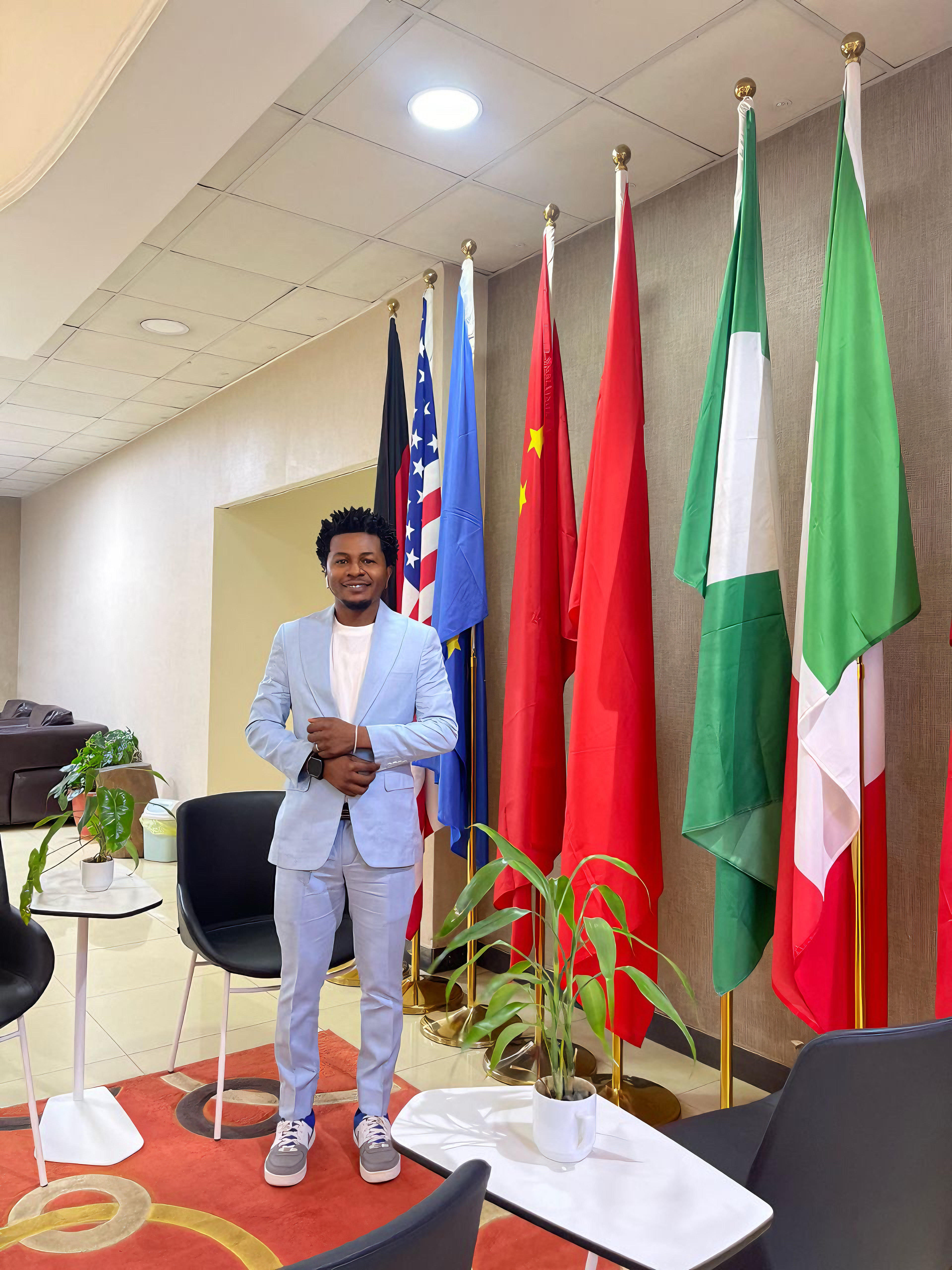
Samuel Ajibola at the 2024 TheNigeriaWeWant Convention at Zuma Rock Resort

Samuel Ajibola is a Nigerian television and film actor as well as a director and producer. He was first known for his role as a child-actor in the Opa Williams produced movie Tears for Love, and best known as his role as Spiff in the Africa Magic TV series called The Johnsons.

== Early life and career ==
Samuel Ajibola was born on the 26th of December in Mazamaza, Lagos State. He is the first of four children of Commander Lanre Ajibola and Mrs Irene Ajibola. He is of Yoruba descent and hails from Ekiti State. Ajibola began his acting career in 1995 at the age of 6 in the Opa Williams produced movie, Tears for Love. He got the role, after he had impressed his aunt, Moyinoluwa Odutayo, herself an actress, during a stage play in Church.

In 2003, he took a hiatus from acting to finish his high school education. In 2009, Ajibola made a return to acting in The Fake Prophet, while pursuing a degree in Political Science at the University of Lagos.

In 2013, he appeared in the MTV Base produced television series, Shuga. He has also appeared in the Nigerian films Last Flight to Abuja, and The Antique alongside Kiki Omeili, Judith Audu and Gloria Young. He also starred in the 2018 movie Merry Men: The Real Yoruba Demons. Ajibola also earned a Master of Public Administration degree and further trained in acting and filmmaking at the Centre for Excellence in Film and Media Studies and the African International Film Festival (AFRIFF) Masterclass.

He launched his production career with the release of his mini web-series "Dele Issues" on the 10th March 2017. In October 2017, he featured former Nigerian President Olusegun Obasanjo on the mini web-series. In 2022, Ajibola starred in the Lasgidi series.
