= 1992 Nigerian Air Force C-130 crash =

1992 aviation accident in Nigeria

- NAF911, the aircraft involved in the accident, pictured in 1989

Accident
- Date: 26 September 1992
- Summary: Multiple engine failure on take-off
- Site: In the Ejigbo canal, Lagos, Nigeria; 6°29′54″N 3°17′15″E

Aircraft
- Aircraft type: Lockheed C-130H Hercules
- Operator: Nigerian Air Force
- Registration: NAF911
- Flight origin: Murtala Muhammed International Airport, Lagos, Nigeria
- Destination: Kaduna Airport, Nigeria
- Occupants: 159
- Passengers: 151
- Crew: 8
- Fatalities: 159
- Survivors: 0

On 26 September 1992, a Nigerian Air Force Lockheed C-130H Hercules crashed three minutes after take-off from Lagos, Nigeria. All 159 people on board were killed, including 8 foreign nationals. The aircraft was taking off at high weight and three of its four engines failed.

A total of 151 Nigerians, 5 Ghanaians, 1 Tanzanian, 1 Zimbabwean, and 1 Ugandan military officers were confirmed to have died. This is the deadliest crash of a C-130 Hercules aircraft. The accident was also one of the list of factors leading to the hijacking of Nigeria Airways Flight 470, with the hijackers demanding a reinvestigation into the cause of the accident.
