= Nneka the Pretty Serpent (2020 film) =

- Directed by: Tosin Igho
- Written by: Adia Uyoyou
- Produced by: Ramsey Nouah; Chris Odeh; Chinenye Esuene
- Starring: Idia Aisien; Bovi Ugboma; Bimbo Ademoye; Zack Orji; Shaffy Bello; Beverly Osu; Waje; Beverly Naya; Sani Mu'azu; Charles Inojie; Judith Audu; Ramsey Nouah
- Production company: Play Network Studios
- Release date: 18 December 2020
- Running time: 140 minutes
- Country: Nigeria
- Languages: English; Igbo
- Box office: ₦50 million

Nneka the Pretty Serpent is a 2020 remake of the 1994 horror mystery film of the same name. It was directed by Tosin Igho with Idia Aisien playing the lead role alongside Bovi Ugboma, Bimbo Ademoye, Zack Orji, Shaffy Bello, Beverly Osu and Ndidi Obi. It was written by Adia Uyoyou.

== Plot ==
Nneka Agu is on a journey to avenge her mother's death. The film starts with a flashback of Little Nneka and her parents celebrating her mother's 32nd birthday. She witnesses the killing of her parents by strange men and runs off. In the present day, Nneka is a waitress working with a critical boss, Gbenga, and a bubbly co-waitress, Ada. She flirts with a customer named Tony Okechukwu. She has dreams about her mother and visits a soothsayer to get answers about her dreams. She starts having audiovisual hallucinations and ends up at sea, where she is possessed by a snake. Upon attaining her powers, the Queen Mother appears to Nneka in a mirror and narrates to her how she (queen mother) lost her powers to a former acquaintance of hers and how Nneka's mother was a member of their coven. Nneka teleports to a mystical land where she meets the Queen Mother, who gives her instructions. Her target is a man named Udoka Ojukwu and his partners at the Island Development Project. Nneka seduces Udoka Ojukwu, kills him, and then makes away with his money. She lives lavishly and buys the restaurant she used to work in and fires her former boss. The pathologist asserts that Ojukwu died from a snakebite. She kills Dr. Fatima during an event by offering her a poisoned perfume. She goes home with Tony but disappears when she notices a ring and a picture of him with a woman who turned out to be his dead wife. Inspector Daniel begins his investigation at the Ojukwus. Queen Mother's beads increase in number with each death. Nneka attacks Tega Oghenekaro at night in order to go undetected. She cuts the power at his mansion and breaks in. She unsuccessfully tries to kill him and escapes. She targets Tony's aunt, Chinonye Nzegwu Ejike. She throws her from a height, killing her. Tony's sister, Tessy, shows up and gives Nneka a hard time. Nneka puts a spell on bananas, which Tessy eats and appears to have a change of mind concerning Nneka. Meanwhile, Queen Mother instructs Nneka to kill Alhaji Abdullahi next; he boards his private jet, and Nneka poses as the hostess. His death from a cardiac arrest and the missing air hostess are announced in the news. Tony introduces Nneka to Tega Oghenekaro as his "girlfriend and future wife". She follows Tega to his office; surprised to see her, she kills him. Nneka launches her company, Brickwood Housing, and throws a soirée where Tony is upset about his uncle's death. Inspector Daniel shows up to question Tony about his alibi. Nneka hands the inspector a pen, which is similar to a pen he saw amongst Udoka Ojukwu's things. This piques his interest. He shows up at Tony's flat and meets only Nneka; she realises that he is onto her, and they engage in a fight, but she kills him. Tony invites Nneka to dinner with his family. His father is Anthony Okechukwu, her next target. She expresses concern to Queen mother as she has to decide between killing the father of or marrying the love of her life. Queen mother warns Nneka that Anthony is a strong man. Nneka meets Anthony in his chapel, and he exorcises her. In order to ensure that the Queen Mother does not regain her powers, Anthony stabs himself. It becomes evident the Queen Mother used Nneka as a pawn and ordered the killing of Nneka's parents. Anthony informs her that she is the rightful Queen Mother and she will dethrone the Queen Mother on her 32nd birthday. Ada dies in a fire at the restaurant. Queen Mother challenges Nneka and asks her to kill Tony also, to Nneka's chagrin. Nneka and Tony go on a vacation, and the Queen Mother possesses Nneka's body, and a battle ensues. Nneka encourages Tony to stab her in order to free her of the Queen Mother. Nneka's mother appears to her and expresses pride, as her actions have brought an end to the reign of the Queen Mother, who misused her powers. Nneka opens a restaurant in honour of Ada, and Richard Williams is one of the first customers.

== Cast ==
- Idia Aisien as Nneka Agu
- Bimbo Ademoye as Ada
- Ndidi Obi as Queen Mother
- Kenneth Okolie as Tony Okechukwu
- Beverly Osu as Tessy Okechukwu
- Zack Orji as Anthony Okechukwu
- Larry Gaaga as Udoka Ojukwu
- Bovi Ugboma as Inspector Daniel
- Keppy Ekpenyong as Tega Oghenekaro
- Shaffy Bello as Dr. Fatima Awolowo
- Charles Okpaleke as Himself
- Chioma Chukwuka as Chinonye Nzegwu Ejike
- Waje as Soothsayer
- Beverly Naya as Nkem Ojukwu
- Sani Mu'azu as Alhaji Abdullahi
- Charles Inojie as Nneka's Landlord
- Judith Audu as Pathologist
- Ramsey Nouah as Richard Williams

== Production and release ==
Auditions for the role of Nneka were held in the Federal Capital Territory, Nigeria and Owerri, Imo State in March 2020. A call for screenwriters was held, and Baruch Apata was announced the winner on 5 May 2020. Ramsey Nouah, Chris Odeh and Chinenye Esuene served as the producers of the film, while Charles Okpaleke was the executive producer. A 41-second trailer was released in November 2020 while the film was released theatrically on 18 December 2020. It grossed ₦50,051,510 in Nthe igerian box office.

Nneka the Pretty Serpent was TV Host, Idia Aisien's debut acting role; she had multiple auditions and was coached by film acting coach Winifred Iguwa, in addition to working with an Igbo Language tutor.

It was released on Netflix on 18 August 2021.

Ndidi Obi, who starred as Nneka in the original film, has a cameo as the Queen Mother.

== Awards and nominations ==
Year	Award	Category	Recipient	Result	Ref
2021	Africa Movie Academy Awards	Best Visual Effects	Nneka the Pretty Serpent	Nominated	
2022	Africa Magic Viewers' Choice Awards	Best Costume Designer	Yoanna ‘Pepper’ Chikezie	Nominated	
2022	Africa Magic Viewers' Choice Awards	Best Lighting Designer	Mathew Yusuf	Nominated	
2022	Africa Magic Viewers' Choice Awards	Best Sound Editor	Habib Adebayo Olaore	Nominated	
2022	Africa Magic Viewers' Choice Awards	Best Make Up	Ugochinyere Ihendi	Nominated	
2022	Africa Magic Viewers' Choice Awards	Best Cinematographer	John Njaga Demps	Nominated	
2022	Africa Magic Viewers' Choice Awards	Best Movie West Africa	Chris Odeh	Nominated	
2022	Africa Magic Viewers' Choice Awards	Best Overall Movie	Tosin Igho And Chris Odeh	Nominated	
