= Rattlesnake: The Ahanna Story =

2020 Nigerian film directed by Ramsey Nouah

- Directed by: Ramsey Nouah
- Screenplay by: Nicole Asinugo
- Story by: Nicole Asinugo
- Produced by: Chris Odeh; Charles Okpaleke
- Starring: Stan Nze; Chiwetalu Agu; Osas Ighodaro; Omotola Jalade Ekeinde; Ayo Makun
- Music by: Larry Gaaga
- Production companies: Play Network Studios; Ramsey Films
- Distributed by: Filmone Distributions
- Release date: 13 November 2020
- Running time: 145 minutes
- Country: Nigeria
- Language: English
- Box office: ₦70 million

Rattlesnake: The Ahanna Story also known as The Armadas, is a 2020 Nigerian thriller action film executive produced by Charles Okpaleke and directed by Ramsey Nouah. It is the official remake of the 1995 Nigerian classic action thriller film Rattlesnake which was directed by Amaka Igwe. The film stars Stan Nze, Chiwetalu Agu, Osas Ighodaro, Omotola Jalade Ekeinde and Ayo Makun in the lead roles. It had its theatrical release on 13 November 2020. It received mixed reviews from critics and ranked 24th overall on the list of highest-grossing Nigerian films of all time at the end of its theatrical run. It is regarded as one of the best Nigerian films of 2020.

== Synopsis ==
Ahanna, an unemployed graduate, is frustrated with his current situation and travels to Lagos in search of his mother, Nancy, who left their village with his siblings and his uncle Odinaka after his father Louis's funeral. Upon arriving in Lagos, Ahanna is robbed, but after collaborating with a book trader for some cash, he locates his mother's Lekki residence. Ahanna is disgusted to discover that Nancy, now living in luxury, is now married to his uncle, and his siblings currently reside with a relative in America. He storms out of the house and pays a visit to his old friends, Nze and his sister, Amara. Nze confides in Ahanna about his colossal debt to drug kingpin Ali Mahmood, who has threatened to kill him in two days unless the money is repaid. Ahanna suggests they rob Odinaka, and he and Nze both break into the property at night. Ahanna's mother recognises her masked son when an envelope bearing his name drops to the floor, and he demands to know how Odinaka had killed Louis, whose death he had always considered suspicious. Odinaka then drops a bombshell—not only were he and Nancy having a secret affair when Ahanna's father was still alive, but he was the biological father of Ahanna's brother Naza.

Ahanna and Nze assemble a group of men called "The Armadas" with several different skills, carrying out a series of spectacular heists. But things take a swift u-turn and the gang suddenly find themselves with new enemies on both sides.

== Cast ==
- Stan Nze as Ahanna Okolo
- Osas Ighodaro as Amara
- Bucci Franklin as Nzenozo
- Chiwetalu Agu as Odinaka
- Omotola Jalade Ekeinde as Maimuna Atafo
- Ayo Makun as Timi Phillips
- Emeka Nwagbaraocha as Sango
- Efa Iwara as Bala
- Tobi Bakre as Ike
- Brutus Richards as Smoke
- Odera Adimorah as Egbe
- Elma Mbadiwe as Adaugo
- Rebecca Nengi Hampson as Boma George
- Norbert Young as Ali Mahmood
- Sonny McDon as Louis
- Gloria Young as Madam Ngozi Maduako
- Ejike Asiegbu as politician
- Chinyere Wilfred as Nancy

== Production ==
The film project was the second directorial venture for director Ramsey Nouah after Living in Bondage: Breaking Free (2019). This also marked the second collaboration between director Ramsey Nouah and producer Charles Okpaleke after the 2019 Nigerian drama film Living in Bondage: Breaking Free. The film was made following the box office success of Living in Bondage: Breaking Free, and the film was announced as a modern-day remake of the 1995 classic film Rattlesnake. The announcement regarding the film remake was revealed by the producer in March 2020. It was initially speculated to be the sequel to Rattlesnake, but the film producer refused the speculations, stating that it is the remake of the yesteryear film in modern day.

Sonny McDon was the only cast member of the 1995 film who was retained to play the supporting role in the remake. Stan Nze played the titular role as Ahanna, the lead character which was initially played by Francis Duru in Rattlesnake. Second runner-up of the Big Brother Naija Lockdown Nengi Rebecca Hampson also played a supporting role in the film, and it was her film acting debut.

The first look poster of the film was unveiled by the Play Network Studios on 1 September 2020 via Instagram. Most of the portions of the film were predominantly shot in Lagos, Abuja and Cape Town, South Africa. The film was shot within a duration of just four weeks amid the COVID-19 pandemic in Nigeria.

== Soundtrack ==
The music for the film is scored by Larry Gaaga. A total of eight tracks were composed for the album featuring A-list Afrobeats artists. The soundtrack album opened to extremely positive reception.

== Release and box office ==
The film premiered at the FilmHouse Cinemas in Lagos on 11 November 2020 prior to the theatrical release. It was theatrically released on 13 November 2020, coinciding with the nationwide End SARS protests in Nigeria against the SARS police band. The film made over ₦13 million (₦13,567,700) in the opening week since its theatrical release. The final cumulative stood at ₦70,381,550 at the box office.

In a review by Culture Custodian, Franklin Ugobude said "The curse of every remake is the inevitable comparison to the original and whether it stacks up to it or not, and The Ahanna Story simply cannot lace the boots of Amaka Igwe's Rattlesnake." Another reviewer rated the movie 6.2/10, saying "Rattlesnake: The Ahanna Story is entertaining and exhausting all at once... but at the same time, it leaves you tingling with pride at the fact that filmmaking in Nollywood has grown in leaps."

== Awards and nominations ==
Year	Award	Category	Recipient	Result	Ref
2021	Africa Movie Academy Awards	Best Actress in a Supporting Role	Gloria Anozie-Young	Nominated	
2021	Africa Movie Academy Awards	Best Nigerian Film	Rattlesnake: The Ahanna Story	Nominated	
2021	Best of Nollywood Awards	Best Actor in a Leading role	Stan Nze	Won	
2021	Best of Nollywood Awards	Best Actress in a Lead role	Osas Ighodaro	Nominated	
2021	Best of Nollywood Awards	Best Actor in a Supporting role	Buchi Franklin	Won	
2021	Best of Nollywood Awards	Best Editing	Rattlesnake: The Ahanna Story	Won	
2021	Best of Nollywood Awards	Best Cinematography	Rattlesnake: The Ahanna Story	Won	
2021	Best of Nollywood Awards	Movie with the Best Sound	Rattlesnake: The Ahanna Story	Nominated	
2021	Best of Nollywood Awards	Movie with the Best Screenplay	Rattlesnake: The Ahanna Story	Nominated	
2021	Best of Nollywood Awards	Movie with the Best Editing	Rattlesnake: The Ahanna Story	Nominated	
2021	Best of Nollywood Awards	Movie with the Best Cinematography	Rattlesnake: The Ahanna Story	Nominated	
2021	Best of Nollywood Awards	Best Use of Costume in a Movie	Rattlesnake: The Ahanna Story	Nominated	
2021	Best of Nollywood Awards	Movie of the Year	Rattlesnake: The Ahanna Story	Nominated	
2021	Best of Nollywood Awards	Director of the Year	Ramsey Nouah	Nominated	
2021	Best of Nollywood Awards	Best Kiss in a Movie	Stan Nze/Osas Ighodaro	Nominated	
2021	Best of Nollywood Awards	Movie with the Best Soundtrack	Rattlesnake: The Ahanna Story	Nominated	
2022	Africa Magic Viewers' Choice Awards	Best Supporting Actor	Bucci Franklin	Nominated	
2022	Africa Magic Viewers' Choice Awards	Best Actress in A Drama	Osas Ighodaro	Won	
2022	Africa Magic Viewers' Choice Awards	Best Actor in A Drama	Stan Nze	Won	
2022	Africa Magic Viewers' Choice Awards	Best Art Director	Pat Nebo	Nominated	
2022	Africa Magic Viewers' Choice Awards	Best Lighting Designer	Mathew Yusuf	Won	
2022	Africa Magic Viewers' Choice Awards	Best Sound Track	Larry Gaagaa	Nominated	
2022	Africa Magic Viewers' Choice Awards	Best Make Up	Carina Ojoko	Nominated	
2022	Africa Magic Viewers' Choice Awards	Best Cinematographer	Muhammed Atta Ahmed	Won	
2022	Africa Magic Viewers' Choice Awards	Best Movie West Africa	Chris Odeh	Nominated	
2022	Africa Magic Viewers' Choice Awards	Best Overall Movie	Ramsey Nouah and Chris Odeh	Nominated	
2022	Africa Magic Viewers' Choice Awards	Best Director	Ramsey Nouah	Won	
