= Nicole Asinugo =

Film writer

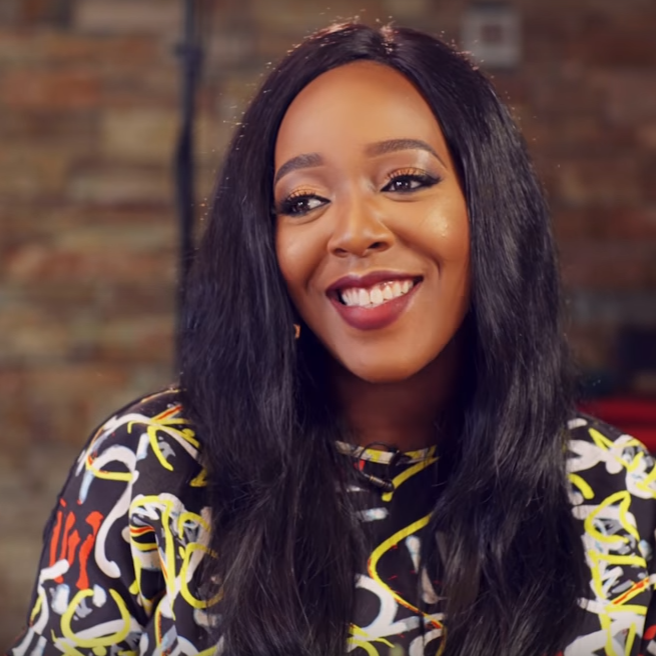
- Nicole Asinugo, August 2017, NdaniRealTalk
- Born: Nicole Asinugo; United Kingdom
- Education: University of Nottingham, London School of Journalism
- Occupations: Managing Editor, Storyteller, producer, Content Creator
- Website: www.nicoleasinugo.com

Nicole Asinugo is a Nigerian screenwriter, producer and storyteller. She was the Joint Winner of the Africa Magic Viewers’ Choice Awards for Best writer in a Movie or TV series in 2020 for her first screenplay, Living in Bondage: Breaking Free. She was also the screenwriter for the Nollywood movie, Rattlesnake which was released in November 2020. She is the storyteller and content curator for World Expo 2020 in United Arab Emirates, after her previous role as lead editor and content producer in Ndani TV.

== Early life and education ==
Asinugo was born in the United Kingdom. She studied law at the University of Nottingham, where she obtained a Bachelor of Laws (LLB) in 2010. After graduation, she acquired a Barrister at Law (BL) certification from the Nigerian Law School in 2011. She then attended the London School of Journalism in 2012 where she obtained a post-graduate diploma (PGD) in Journalism.

== Career ==
Asinugo was an editor at In and out magazine in 2010 which was a Nigerian tourism focused magazine. In 2012, went to Channels Television as a news writer, covering stories in the Environment, Aviation and Foreign Affairs. In 2013, worked for an advertising agency called DDB in Lagos for three years becoming a senior copywriter. She created the accounts of Diageo, Pernod Ricard, Unilever, MTN and Interswitch as well as creating visuals for ad campaigns. In 2016 Asinugo joined Ndani TV in Lagos, as lead editor and content producer.

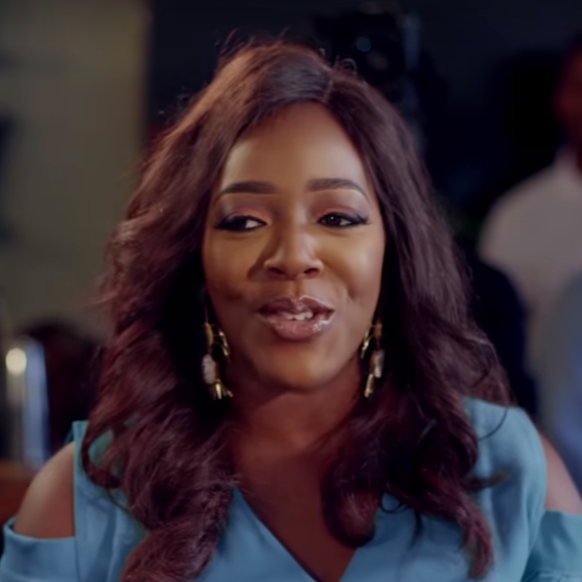
Nicole Asinugo on NdaniRealtalk S2E1

Asinugo's role as the lead editor, Ndani lifestyle charged her with the creation, launching and managing of the Ndani lifestyle blog.

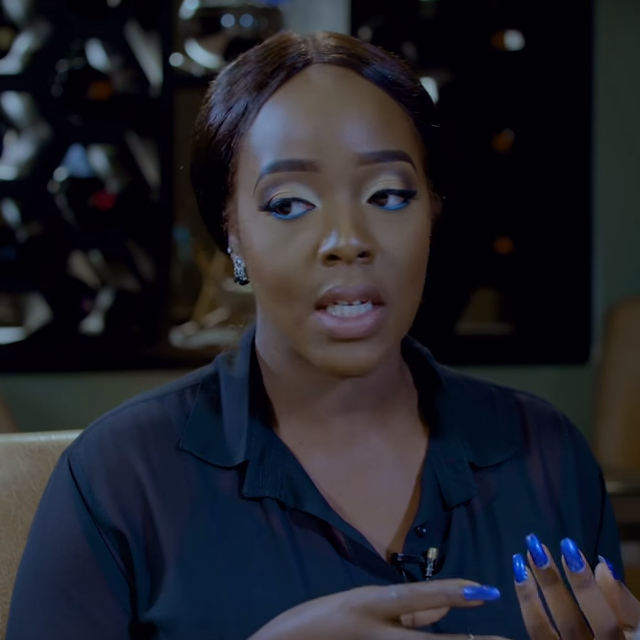
Nicole on NdaniRealtalk S2E10

She was the content producer producing and hosting Ndani TV's Real Talk show. She quit her job with Ndani TV for world expo 2020 Dubai as the storyteller and content curator in 2020, where she is developing narratives for country pavilions.

In 2019, she produced her first screenplay Living in Bondage: Breaking Free which was the joint Winner of the 7th edition of the Africa magic viewers’ choice award (AMVCA) with C.J. Obasi on 6 February 2020, at the Eko expo hall on Victoria Island, Lagos. In April 2020, she concluded her second screenplay "Rattle Snake", ready for a November/December 2020 release. She has a blog "2 scoops of life and style", where she shares her experiences with Nigerian culture and richness of life living alone in Lagos. The blog features a book club section, where she meets with interested readers monthly to read and discuss a book of interest.

== Awards and nominations ==
Asinugo received an award for her work as joint winner of the best writer in a movie or TV series at the 7th edition of Africa Magic viewers’ Choice Awards (AMVCA).

=== Africa Magic Viewers Choice Awards ===
Year	Nominee / work	Award	Result
2020	Living in Bondage: Breaking Free	Best Writer Movie/TV Series	Won
