= Idia Aisien =

Nigerian-American model, actress and TV presenter (born 1991)

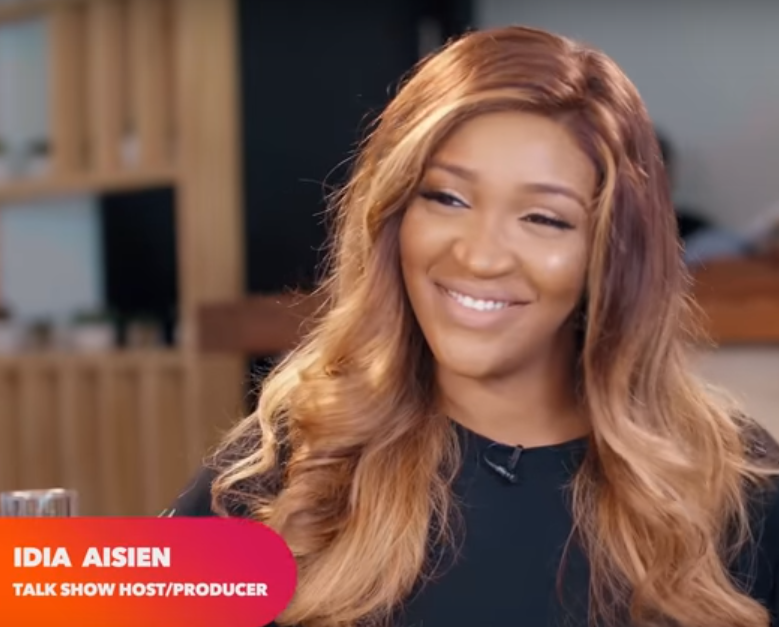
- 2018 on NdaniTV
- Born: Idia Aisien; 4 July 1991 (age 35); Lagos State, Nigeria
- Education: New York University; American University
- Occupations: Television presenter; model; actress
- Years active: 2014–present
- Notable work: Nneka The Pretty Serpent
- Television: You Got Issues, Style 101
- Website: http://www.idiaaisien.com/

Idia Aisien is a Nigerian-American model, TV presenter, and actress.

== Early life ==
Aisien is of Nigerian and Cameroonian descent. She was born on 4 July 1991, in Lagos to champagne magnate Joe Aisien, and jeweler Emmanuella Aisien.

As a teenager, Aisien attended Atlantic Hall High School, in Lagos. She then moved to the United States, where she attained a B.A. in journalism from American University in Washington, D.C., and an M.S. in international public relations and global corporate communications from New York University.

== Career ==
=== Modelling ===
Aisien has worked with Fox 5 News, the AARP Foundation, Discovery Communications, the Foreign Policy Initiative, the United Nations, and Atlas Mara. She has modeled for many brands, such as BMW, Vogue, LAN Airlines, Aura, Black Opal, Nivea, Alice + Olivia, J Brand, Cashhimi, Samantha Pleet, Jovani, Evelyn Lambert, Nikki Angelique, An Alili and Sway Hair Ltd.

In Nigeria, she currently hosts You Got Issues and Style 101 on Spice TV, and the Mega Millions Lottery Draw on Silverbird. She currently works with international news TV station Arise News.

=== Acting ===
Aisen featured as the lead character in the remake of the Nollywood classic Nneka The Pretty Serpent, which was released on 18 December 2020.

== Personal life ==
Aisien has described herself as being "Smart. Strong. Funny. Complicated. Deep". A stranger once gifted her a Range Rover.

== Filmography ==
- Nneka the Pretty Serpent (2020)
- Slum King (2023)
- Hijack '93 (2024)
