= Roses and Ivy =

2024 Nigerian film

Roses and Ivy is a 2024 Nigerian TV series directed by Biodun Stephen and distributed by Prime Video. It stars Uche Montana, Munachi Abii, Kalu Ikeagwu, Taye Arimoro, and Jaiye Kuti.

== Reception ==
Open Country Mag listed it as one of the ten best Nollywood films and TV series of 2024. Open Country Mag review. Premium Times rates it 7/10.
