= Henry Okoroji =

Nigerian footballer

Henry Ndubueze Okoroji
Personal information
- Date of birth: 12 April 1984 (age 42)
- Place of birth: Ngor Okpala, Nigeria
- Height: 1.85 m (6 ft 1 in)
- Position: Defender

Team information
- Current team: Casertana
- Number: 22

Youth career
- until 2002: Farmers Academy
- 2002–2003: Reggiana

Senior career*
Years	Team	Apps	(Gls)
2003–2004	Reggiana	11	(1)
2004–2007	Pro Vasto	16	(0)
2007	Fiorentina	0	(0)
2007	→ PFC Lokomotiv Plovdiv (loan)	0	(0)
2007–2008	→ Chieti (loan)	10	(0)
2008–2010	Pro Vasto	44	(1)
2010–2011	Flaminia Civita Castellana	19	(1)
2011–2012–2013	Casertana Montalto uffugo calcio	17	(0)
- * Club domestic league appearances and goals

Henry Ndubueze Okoroji (born 12 April 1984 in Ngor Okpala) is a Nigerian footballer who currently plays for Casertana F.C.

== Career ==
After the 1994 World Cup a series of Nigerian players were brought to the European top leagues. Okoroji's mentor Prince Ikpe Ekong was one of them as he was signed by Italian club A.C. Reggiana back then coached by Carlo Ancelotti. Ikpe Ekong recommended his club to get their hands on a very talented defender Henry Okoroji. He arrived in 2003 as Prince was already on his way out after battling against the whole Serie A in the court and won.

=== Fiorentina and Serie A ===
Henry has played most of his career in the third and fourth level of Italian football. Due to strict non-EU player rules African players have had it hard in Italy. In 2007 however, Henry's skills were noticed by ACF Fiorentina who signed the player on a 1-year contract.

Henry was loaned to Bulgaria, but shortly after his arrival was recalled back to Italy. Therefore, he didn't play any games that season on first level. Later on he was loaned to Chieti Calcio before he went back to FC Pro Vasto.
