= Nnamdi Agbo =

Nigerian actor

- Born: Nnamdi Pius Agbo; 1 September; Lagos, Nigeria
- Education: University of Nigeria, Nsukka
- Notable work: Hijack '93, Cheta'm

Nnamdi Agbo is a Nigerian actor best known for his role as Skipper in the Netflix original film Hijack '93.

== Background ==
Agbo is from Enugu State and was born in Lagos, Nigeria on 1 September. He studied theatre and film at the University of Nigeria, Nsukka.

== Career ==
In 2019, Agbo made his screen debut as CeeJay in Ordinary Fellows. In 2020, he played Wisdom in the series Crazy, Lovely, Cool, directed by Obi Emelonye which premiered on Netflix. In 2021, he portrayed Mohammed Babangida in Badamasi: Portrait of a General, also directed by Emelonye. In 2022, Agbo wrote, produced and co-directed the short film Bound: Lost In The Moment, which addressed dissociative identity disorder.

After appearing in stage plays, Agbo gained wider recognition for portraying Omar "Skipper" in the Netflix original Hijack '93. Directed by Robert O. Peters and written by Musa Jeffery David, the film is based on the 1993 Nigerian Airways hijack. He also began starring as Prince Nwoye in the Showmax original drama series, Cheta'm in the same year. In 2025, he played a street thug, Soso in the Africa Magic film Everything Light Touches. Both Cheta'm and Everything Light Touches earned nominations at the 2025 AMVCAs. The latter won the award for Best MultiChoice Talent Factory. In May 2025, Agbo debuted in Fix+Foxy's global theatre play The Village, which featured actors from Los Angeles, Mumbai, Istanbul and Lagos, and was staged in Denmark.

In October 2026, Agbo began starring as Richie in the romantic drama series Better Half on Africa Magic Showcase.

== Filmography ==
Year	Title	Role
2019	Ordinary Fellows	CeeJay
2020	Crazy, Lovely, Cool	Wisdom
2021	Badamasi; Portrait of a General	Mohammed Babangida
2022	Bound: Lost in the Moment (Short film)	Chuks
2024	Hijack '93	Skipper
2024	Cheta'm (Series)	Prince Nwoye
2025	Everything Light Touches	Soso
2025	The Village (Stage Play)	
2026	Better Half	Richie
