= Preye Odibo =

- Education: Department of Theatre Arts, University of Ibadan
- Occupation: Producer
- Organization: Native Media
- Notable work: The Johnsons; Wura

Preye Odibo is a Nigerian television and film producer. She is known for producing The Johnsons, which won Best Africa Magic Original Comedy Series at the 2023 Africa Magic Viewers' Choice Awards. She is the producer of Wura which was nominated for an Best Writing TV Series, and Best Scripted Series categories at the 2024 Africa Magic Viewers' Choice Awards.

== Career ==
Through her company, Native Media, Odibo has produced over 2,080 episodes of The Johnsons for the Africa Magic platform. She has also produced the series Wura for Showmax, which is an adaptation of the South African soap opera The River. Her production company also produced Hijack '93.

== Filmography ==
- 2023–till date, Wura
- 2024, Hijack '93
- 2022, The Johnsons
