= Badamasi =

- Directed by: Obi Emelonye
- Written by: Obi Emelonye
- Starring: Enyinna Nwigwe
- Cinematography: Abiola Oke
- Release date: 12 June 2021 (London)
- Running time: 135 minutes
- Countries: Nigeria; United Kingdom
- Language: English

Badamasi: Portrait of a General is a biopic film about former Nigerian head of state, Ibrahim Badamasi Babangida (IBB). It was directed by Obi Emelonye and stars Enyinna Nwigwe in the lead role as Babangida. It is the first Nollywood political biopic.

== Plot ==
Badamasi tells the story of Babangida from his origin in the village of Wushishi in Northern Nigeria to his joining the army and time as a Nigerian military head of state. It also portrays significant events in Babangida's life including the period of the Nigerian civil war where Babangida sustains injuries in an attempt to rescue a colleague. The subsequent military coups and annulment of the June 1993 presidential elections were also portrayed.

== Cast ==
- Enyinna Nwigwe as Ibrahim Badamasi Babangida
- Charles Inojie as Barrister Clement Akpamgo
- Sani Danja as General Sani Abacha
- Yakubu Mohammed as Prof. Jibril Aminu
- Okey Bakassi as Chief Arthur Nzeribe
- Kalu Ikeagwu as Professor Humphrey Nwosu
- Julius Agwu as Professor Chu Okongwu
- Chris Ada as Dr. Schaffhauser
- Nnamdi Agbo as Mohammed Babangida
- Uche Nwozuzu as General Ty Danjuma
- Erick Didie as Colonel Buka Suka Dimka
- Bako Abelo as 14 year old Abdulsalami
- Tony Aclet as R. Admiral Augustus Aikhomu
- Ajao Ayobami as Aminu Babangida
- Ademola Amoo as newscaster
- Musa Kabir Ajimi as school bully

== Production and release ==
Production for Badamasi commenced in 2017. The film is set in 1980s and 1990s Nigeria and was shot on location in Lagos, Minna, Abuja and the University of Nigeria (UNN), Nsukka. The film director told a Pulse Nigeria interviewer that it took him four years to convince Babangida to allow him make the biopic. The film was initially billed for a 29 November 2019 release date but was delayed due to reported "powerful people" who were against the circulation of the film. There were concerns that the biopic might be an attempt to whitewash Babangida's story as the annulment of the June 1993 presidential elections earned Babangida condemnation. Shiloh Godson handled the sound design. The first look trailer was released in September 2019. Badamasi premiered at the Cineworld O2 Arena in South London on 12 June 2021.

== Critical reception ==
A reviewer for The Guardian praised the film for its production and attention to technical details noting that "It did not 'feel' like Nollywood" and was in keeping with Obi Emelonye's other films including Heart 2 Heart, The Mirror Boy, Last Flight to Abuja and Onye Ozi.

=== Awards and nominations ===
Year	Award	Category	Recipient	Result	Ref
2020	Africa Movie Academy Awards	Best Actor in a Leading Pole	Enyinna Nwigwe	Nominated	
2020	Africa Movie Academy Awards	Best Visual Effects	Badamasi	Nominated	
2021	Best of Nollywood Awards	Best Actor in a Leading Role (English)	Enyinna Nwigwe	Nominated	
2021	Best of Nollywood Awards	Best Actor in a Supporting Role (English)	Sani Danja	Nominated	
2021	Best of Nollywood Awards	Movie with the Best Special Effect	Badamasi	Nominated	
2021	Best of Nollywood Awards	Movie with the Best Production Design	Badamasi	Nominated	
2021	Best of Nollywood Awards	Movie with the Best Cinematography	Badamasi	Nominated	
