= Obinna Egu =

Nigerian politician

Member of the Imo State House of Assembly
- Constituency: Ngor Okpala State Constituency

Personal details
- Born: Imo State, Nigeria
- Occupation: Politician

Prince Ambrose Obinna Eguis a Nigerian politician who currently serves as a member of the Imo State House of Assembly, representing the Ngor Okpala state constituency.

== Early life ==
Egu is from Ngor Okpala Local Government Area of Imo State, Nigeria.

== Political career ==
Egu contested the Ngor Okpala State Constituency seat in the Imo State House of Assembly election held in March 2023 as a candidate of the All Progressives Congress (APC). He won the election and became the representative of the constituency in the Assembly. The Imo State House of Assembly lists Egu as the member representing Ngor Okpala State Constituency.

== Legislative activities ==
Egu has taken part in legislative proceedings in the Imo State House of Assembly. In May 2024, he moved a motion calling for the revival and reconstitution of the board of the Imo State Rural Roads Maintenance Agency (IRROMA). The motion was adopted by the House. In 2024, Egu was also appointed chairman of the House Committee on Science and Technology.
