= Busola Tejumola =

Nigerian media executive

- Born: 6 December 1979 (age 46)
- Citizenship: Nigeria
- Occupations: Filmmaker, Film producer, Media expert, Content creator, Storyteller, Life coach

Busola Tejumola is a Nigerian media executive. She is the current Executive Head, General Entertainment Channels at MultiChoice group.

== Education ==
She graduated from University of Surrey with an M.Sc. in Management Information Systems. She holds a PhD in Management Information Systems from Brunel University.

== Career ==
Busola joined as Consumer Insight Manager in 2012, then assumed the Head of Strategy and Insights role in 2014. She became GM, Content in 2017 where she launched Big Brother Naija. In 2018, she became the Head of Production and led the production of the Africa Magic Viewers’ Choice Awards. She was appointed as the Executive Head, Content and West Africa Channels in 2021. She was elected as a member International Academy of Television Arts & Science in November 2023.
