= Obiangwu =

Town in Imo state, Nigeria

- Town and ward
- Location within Nigeria
- Coordinates: 5°26′N 7°11′E
- Country: Nigeria
- State: Imo State
- LGA: Ngor Okpala
- Time zone: UTC+1 (WAT)
- Area code: 460133

Obiangwu or Isuobiangwu, is a town and ward of Ngor Okpala Local Government Area, Imo State in southeastern Nigeria, 51.0 kilometres (31.7 mi) by road northwest of the city of Aba, immediately to the west of Sam Mbakwe International Cargo Airport. Umuene Obiangwu lies to the northwest of the main village.

The Eke-Isu Market serves the locals in the centre of the town. The settlement contains the St Mary's Catholic Church and the Assemblies of God Church. The Community School was opened in 1948.

== History ==
Obiangwu like several other villages in the Owerri vicinity was an area of "intense missionary activity" in the early 20th century. The Community Pry School in the village was established in 1948.

In January 1981, the construction of the Enyiogugu Eziala - Obiangwu Umuawa Road was approved.

In April 2022 it was reported that the Federal College of Agriculture, Ishiagu, Ebonyi State had floated a tender for the rehabilitation of Eke-Isu Market in Obiangwu.

In late March 2023, it was reported that gunmen killed three personnel of the Nigeria Security and Civil Defence Corps at Eke-Isu Market in the village. An official of the NSCDC reported that two workers from the telecommunications company MTN Nigeria had also been killed, but this was denied by the company.

== Geography ==
Isuobiangwu lies immediately to the west of Sam Mbakwe International Cargo Airport, 51.0 kilometres (31.7 mi) by road northwest of the city of Aba, and 26.1 kilometres (16.2 mi) to the southeast of the city Owerri. Umuene Obiangwu lies to the northwest.

== Landmarks ==
The settlement contains the St Mary's Catholic Church and the Assemblies of God Church. The Eke-Isu Market serves the locals in the centre of the village. The Community School in close proximity to the churches in the eastern side of the village. There is a secondary school at Umuene Obiangwu. The principal health centre is Obiangwu Primary Health Center, which was announced to have been completed in a report dated to 2010.

== Culture ==
On 18 October 2018, local royal James Ibenyenwa Diala opened the Iriji Festival in Obiangwu at his estate.

== Notable people ==
- Professor Charles Njoku (born 1940) - veterinary pathologist and university teacher at the University of Calabar
- Enyinna Nwigwe (born 1982) - actor
- Johnny K.C. Nosike (born 1963) - Entrepreneur, philanthropist and initiator of Afo Agarachaa Obiangwu
