= Larry Gaaga =

Nigerian recording artist

- Born: Larry Ndianefo
- Genres: Pop; R&B; Afro pop; African hip hop
- Occupations: Record Producer, Musician
- Years active: 2011–present
- Labels: Gaaga Muzik; Def Jam Africa; Universal Music Nigeria

Larry Ndianefo (born 25 August 1981), professionally known as Larry Gaaga, is a Nigerian songwriter, recording artist, music producer, and record label executive. He gained fame with the success of Gaga Shuffle, a song performed by 2Baba Idibia.

== Early career ==
Larry Gaaga began his career in the entertainment industry in 2012 as the General Manager of YSG Entertainment, managing the career of rapper Vector. He went on to feature on one of Vector's tracks, "Get Down" alongside 2Baba. That same year, he was nominated for “Entertainment Man of the Year” at the Nigerian Entertainment Awards.

== Gaga Shuffle ==
In 2017, 2Baba released a collaborative track featuring Larry Gaaga, titled “Gaga Shuffle”, the song was named after one of Larry Gaaga's signature dance moves. According to the song's producer, Dapiano, the track was completely unplanned - it came about when both artists heard the track at the studio and was recorded within 30 minutes. It was the success of this song that encouraged Gaaga to pursue his passion for music and performing.

== 2018-present ==
In 2018, Larry Gaaga released five hit singles, including ‘Wonderful’ featuring Wande Coal and Sarkodie, and ‘Doe’ featuring Davido. He also collaborated with artists like Burna Boy, D’banj, Base One, DJ Neptune and Charass. That same year, Gaaga secured a record deal with Universal Music Group Nigeria.

In 2019, Gaaga teamed up with 2Baba again to release the love song ‘Iworiwo’. Soon after he released ‘Low’, a collaboration with Wizkid, that has already amassed over 11 million views on YouTube. While Gaaga is signed to Universal Music Group Nigeria, he remains the CEO of Gaaga Muzik.

In October 2019, it was revealed that Larry Gaaga had worked extensively on the soundtrack album for the sequel of one of Nigeria's premiere film productions, Living in Bondage. The album also featured Davido, Flavour, Peruzzi, Patoranking and 2Baba. In May 2020, he signed a record deal with Def Jam Africa, a flagship of Def Jam Recordings.

On 13 June 2022, Gaaga was announced as the vice president of Def Jam Africa, and the head of the A&R division across the English-speaking markets in Africa.

In November 2022, Gaaga and 2Baba formed a musical duo with the moniker The Kabal. They released their debut single as a duo tagged Mad Over Hills in the same month.

In September 2023, Larry Gaaga was appointed as the Vice President and General Manager of Gamma in Africa

== Awards and nominations ==
Year	Award	Category	Work	Result	Ref
2020	Africa Magic Viewers' Choice Awards	Best Soundtrack	Living in Bondage: Breaking Free	Won	
2021	Africa Magic Viewers' Choice Awards	Best Soundtrack	Rattlesnake: The Ahanna Story	Lost	

== Other ventures ==
In addition to music, Gaaga is an oil and gas executive, and sits on the board of KL Oil and Gas. Larry Gaaga is also a brand ambassador for both D’usse and Afa Sports. On 5 November 2022, he was unveiled alongside Pere Egbi and Cubana Chief Priest, as ambassadors for Gulder lager beer as part of the "Ultimate Squad" for the "Senior Man" campaign.

== Discography ==
- Obodo ft. Phyno, Flavour
- Egedege Ft. Phyno, Flavour and Theresa Onuorah
- Iworiwo Ft. 2baba Shawa Shawa Ft Dj Neptune, Slimcase, Olamide, CDQ
- Doe Ft Davido
- Baba Nla Ft 2baba, Burna Boy & D’Banj
- Azaman ft. Slimcase, 2baba & Peruzzi
- Wonderful Ft. Sarkodie, Wande Coal
- Sho Ja Ft. Base One
- Kiri Koko Ft Shina Peller, Broda Shaggi
- Low Ft Wizkid
- In My Head ft Patoranking
- Doubting Thomas ft Davido
- Man No Be God Ft. Charass
- Abeg Ft, Magnito, Uzikwendu, Slow Dogg and Zoro
- Letter from Overseas ft. Black Sherif

== See also ==
- List of Nigerian musicians
