= Kalu Ikeagwu =

British-Nigerian actor and writer

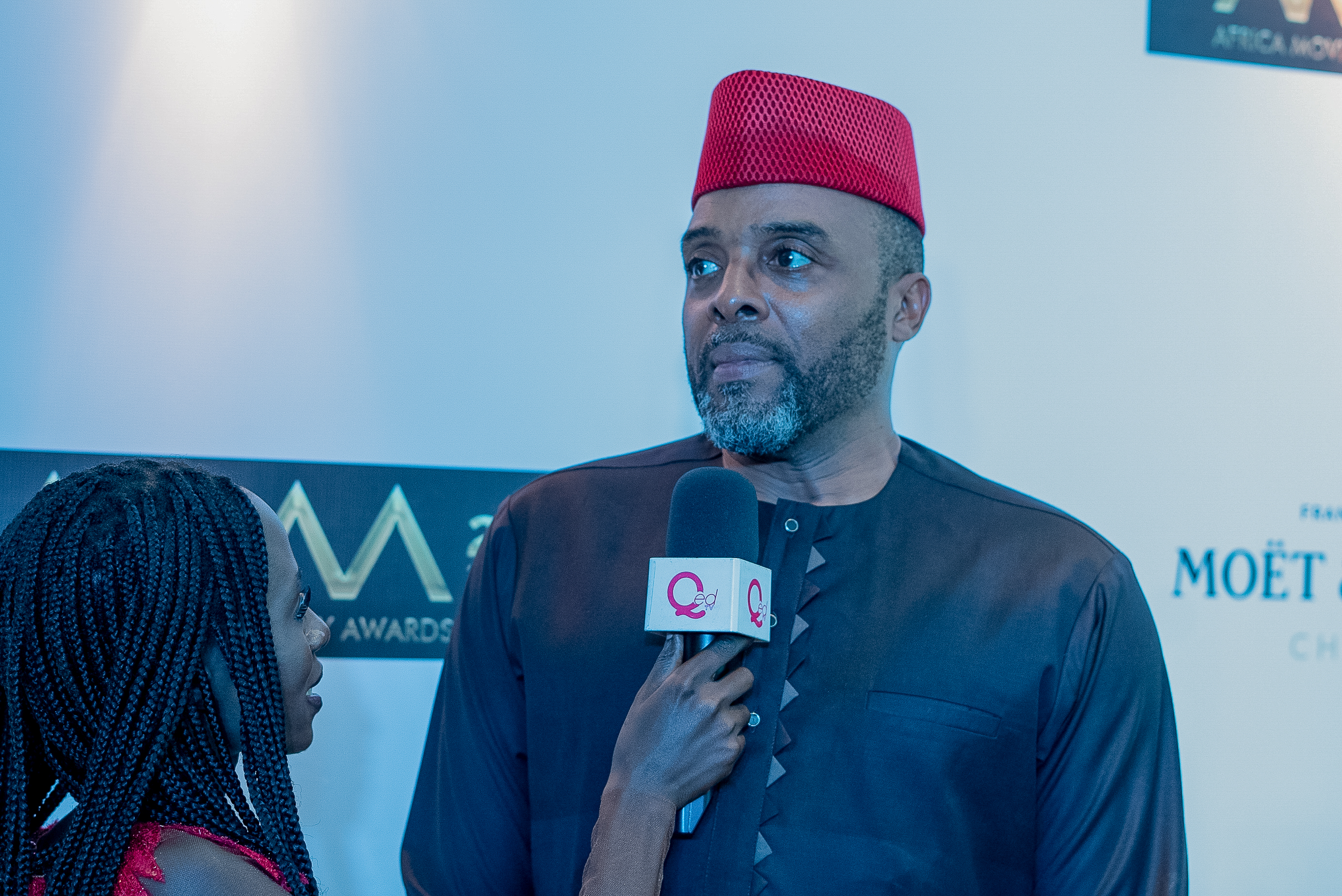
- Kalu Ikeagwu at AMA Award 21
- Born: Kalu Egbui Ikeagwu; 18 May; England
- Citizenship: Nigeria
- Occupation: Actor
- Years active: 2005–present
- Known for: 30 Days, Domino, Accident, Broken, Damage, Two Brides and a Baby
- Television: Tinsel, Domino, 168, Doctors' Quarters

Kalu Egbui Ikeagwu is a British-Nigerian actor and a writer. As an actor he received many awards and nominations because of his performance on the screen.

== Early life ==
Kalu was born in England and his dad brought him back to Nigeria at the age of 9 for him not to forget his origin. He worked as a Computer Analyst before entering into Nollywood. He hails from Abia State.

== Education ==
He did his primary school education in England and Zambia then University of Nigeria wher he obtained his degree in English Literature. He also obtained his diploma in Business Management from the University of Nigeria Nsukka.

== Career ==
Ikeagwu started his acting for the first time in 2005 in Domino TV series. His first stage performance was in Put Out The Houselights and Esiaba Ironsi. He starred in classical memories Nigeria movies, some including "Major Lejoka Brown" in Ola Rotimi, Our Husband Has Gone Mad Again and a role as "RIP" in Esiaba Irobi's Hangmen Also Die. He starred in the movies shown at Edinburgh Festivals in 1995 and 1997. He acted in his first film as "David Salako" in For Real for Emem Isong's, after he completed the film, Kalu exclaimed ifa Danfo (Lagos metro bus) was to hit him, he will die with a smile on his face. He starred in so many films including 30 Days, The Wrong Woman, Distance Between, Between Two Worlds and Irish film production "Rapt In Éire". On television, he starred so many popular series some include Domino, 168 and Doctors' Quarters (MNet Production). He was also known as "Alahji Abubakar" a.k.a. Masters in Nigerian hit TV series Tinsel.

Kalu Ikeagwu has appeared in a number of films including 30 Days, Domino, Accident, Broken, Damage, Two Brides and a Baby and so many others.

In2019, Ikeagwu starred in "Three Thieves", where Sammy Egbemawei, Abba Makama, and Africa Ukoh; produce alongside Angel Unigwe. The movie was on cinemas in Nigeria 4 October, Babatunwa Aderinokun and Uche Okocha was Executive Producer and producer respectively.

== Personal life ==
He was an Atheist before he gave his life to Christ when he was 9 years.

One of his major challenges when he started acting was when he change from acting on stage to for everyone to see to acting of television. His wife left him and he was left with his family and friends.

== Filmography ==
Year	Title	Role
2014	Second Chances	Osagie
	Kafa Coh	
2006	30 Days	Jerry Ehime
2008	The Distance Between	Ike
	Between Two Worlds	
2008	Love my way	Richard
	The Wrong Woman	
2005	Fragile Pain	
2004	For Real	David
	Games Men Play	
	Insecurity	
	Crisis In Paradise	
	War Without End	
	My Precious Son	
	Beneath Her Veil	
2012	Damage	Taiwo
	Daniel's Destiny Plan	
2018	Lionheart	Samuel Akah
2005	Pretty Angels	
	The Lost Maiden	
2005	Darkest Night	
	Freedom Bank	
2010	The Waiting Years	
2007	Ocean Deep	
2011	Count On Me	Mel
2011	Two Brides and a Baby	Deji
2013	Broken	
	Accident	
2014	Blue Flames	Emeka
2014	Musical Whispers	David
2019	Heaven's Hell	Efosa Elliots
2015	O-Town (film)	Chairman
2014	My rich boyfriend	
2019	Three Thieves	Mr. Avworo
2019	Light in the Dark	Emeka
2018	The Women	
2020	Badamasi	
2020	Nineteen	Lugan
2021	September 23	Effiong
2021	This is how it ends	Jide
2022	The Brightons	Mr. Brighton
2023	Push	Effiong
2023	King Mabutu	King Mabutu
2023	The Other One	
2024	In the Cold	Frank
2025	Ms. Kanyin	Principal
	Domino	
	Doctors' Quarters	
	168	
	Circle Of Three	
	Super Story	
	Tinsel	
	Diiche	
	Cheta'M	
	Roses and Ivy	

== Accolades ==
Year	Award	Category	Result	Ref
2018	Nollywood Travel Film Festival Awards	Best Actor	Won	
2014	Best of Nollywood Awards	Best Supporting actor	Nominated	
2014	Golden Icons Academy Movie Awards	Best Actor	Nominated	
2013	Golden Icons Academy Movie Awards	Best Actor	Nominated	
2013	Africa Magic Viewers Choice Awards	Best Supporting Actor	Nominated	
2012	Ghana Movie Awards	Best Actor (African Collaboration)	Nominated	
2011	Best of Nollywood Awards	Best Supporting Actor	Nominated	
2006	Africa Movie Academy Awards	Best Upcoming Actor	Nominated	
