= Nigeria Airways Flight 470 =

1993 aircraft hijacking

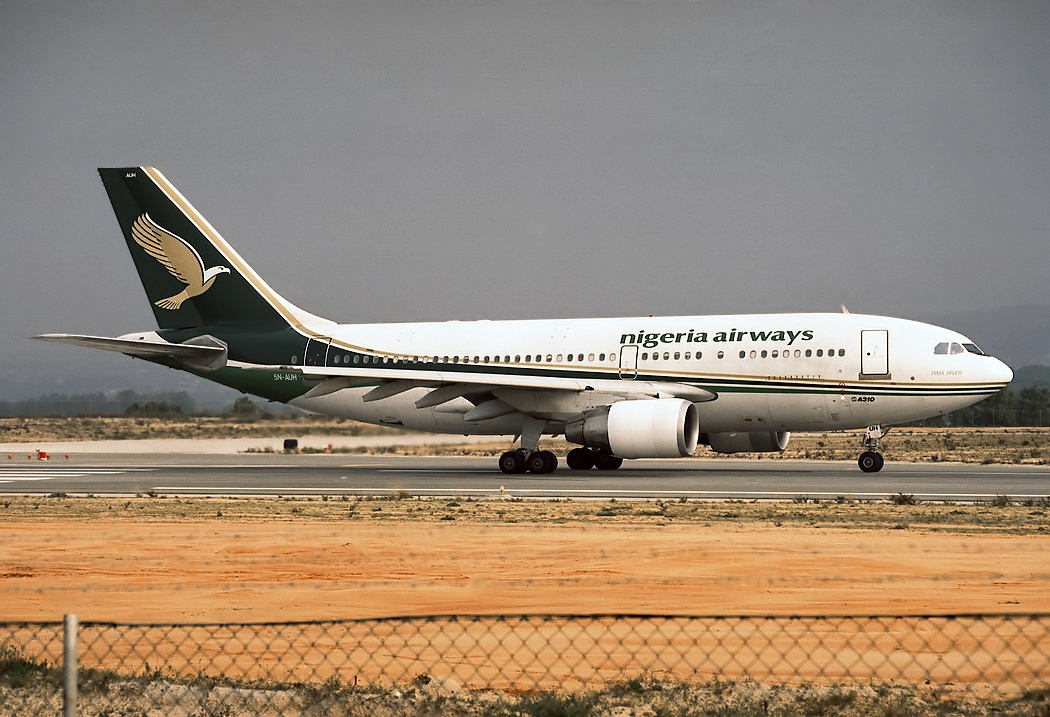
- 5N-AUH, the aircraft involved, in 1994

Hijacking
- Date: 25 October 1993
- Summary: Hijacking
- Site: en route

Aircraft
- Aircraft type: Airbus A310-222
- Aircraft name: Rima River
- Operator: Nigeria Airways
- IATA flight No.: WT470
- ICAO flight No.: NGA470
- Call sign: NIGERIAN 470
- Registration: 5N-AUH
- Flight origin: Murtala Muhammed International Airport, Lagos, Nigeria
- Destination: Nnamdi Azikiwe International Airport, Abuja, Nigeria
- Occupants: 149
- Passengers: 138
- Crew: 11
- Fatalities: 1
- Injuries: 4
- Survivors: 148

On Monday, 25 October 1993, Nigeria Airways Flight 470, an Airbus A310 flight from Lagos to Abuja was hijacked by 4 youths aged between 19 and 24. (Note: Some other sources say the group's age is between 19 and over 20.)

== Aircraft ==
The aircraft was an Airbus A310-222, MSN 340, registration 5N-AUH, powered by two PW JT9D-7R4E1 engines. The aircraft was delivered by Airbus to Nigeria Airways in December 1984, and was used for 22 years before being scrapped at Murtala Muhammed International Airport in July 2006. The plane had been involved in a collision with a maintenance vehicle at Heathrow Airport, London, a year before the hijacking.

== Background ==
Richard Ogunderu, Kabir Adenuga, Benneth Oluwadaisi and Kenny Rasaq-Lawal boarded the flight initially planned to fly from Lagos to Abuja, with passengers including top government officials among them Rong Yiren, the vice president of China, and Nigerian government officials.

The hijackers had planned to divert the aircraft to Frankfurt, Germany. However, the plane needed to stop over for refueling in Niamey, Niger Republic. When the flight landed at the Diori Hamani International Airport in Niamey, the hijackers announced that the flight had been taken over by "Movement for the Advancement of Democracy in Nigeria". The hijackers demanded that the Nigerian military-backed interim government resign and name Moshood Abiola as the president. Other demands from the hijackers included address the unresolved murder of Dele Giwa, the founding Editor-in-Chief of Newswatch Magazine and reinvestigate the cause of flight NAF911 crash in 1992. The four hijackers said they would set the Airbus A310 on fire in 72 hours if this demand was not met. After two hours of negotiations they freed 129 people, including Rong Yiren, from the plane and held back the crew and Nigerian government officials.

After four days, the gendarmes invaded the plane and arrested the hijackers. The rescue operation killed crew member Ethel Igwe, while Richard was also injured.

== Aftermath ==
The hijackers spent 9 years, 4 months in Niger prison. Shortly after the hijack, Ernest Shonekan's interim government was replaced by General Sani Abacha's government.

=== Dramatization ===
- In October 2024, the 1993 Nigerian Airways hijack was depicted in the Netflix film Hijack '93.
