= Charles Inojie =

Nigerian actor and comedian

- Education: University of Port Harcourt
- Occupations: Actor, Film director
- Years active: 1999—present
- Children: 2

Charles Inojie is a Nigerian actor, comedian, movie director and producer. He is known for his comedic roles.

== Early life and education ==
Charles is from a royal family. He grew up with his grandmother, and hardly recollects his mother because at a young age he was sent to another geographical location for the purpose of keeping his aging grandmother company. Charles Inojie, the renowned Nigerian actor, comedian, movie director, and producer, hails from a distinguished royal family. His formative years were spent under the care of his grandmother, creating a bond that shaped his early experiences. Separated from his mother at a young age, Charles found solace in companionship with his aging grandmother, a decision that would significantly impact his upbringing. Despite harboring aspirations of becoming a lawyer, Charles’ path took a different turn after attending Bode Osoyin’s writer’s resort. It was during this transformative experience that he decided to pursue a certificate course in dramatic arts. In 1993, he successfully achieved this goal, laying the foundation for his future in the world of entertainment. Subsequently, Charles graduated from the University of Port Harcourt in 1999, solidifying his commitment to the craft of acting.

== Career ==
After making the decision to venture into acting, he then joined different dramatic and theatre clubs in his local town and started performing stage drama. He later decided to acquire more knowledge in the field of acting and then enrolled for a one-year acting program in Bode Osoyin's Writers Resort, where he obtained a certificate course in Dramatic Arts after completing the program in 1993.

After graduating from the University of Port Harcourt in 1999, he relocated to Lagos State. He became the assistant director at Lancelot Oduwa Imasuen's production company.

In 2016, members from the Screen Writers Guild of Nigeria (SWGN) unanimously appointed Inojie as president of their labor union.

In February 2024, Inojie announced the conclusion of the Africa Magic family sitcom The Johnsons after 13 years on air, officially marking the end of his role as the lead character, Lucky Johnson.

== Personal life ==
Inojie is married and has two children.

== Selected filmography ==
=== Film ===
- The Royal Hibiscus Hotel (2017) as Chef
- Dinner (2016) as Airport Guard
- Broken Soul (2015) as Chijioke
- Shattered Soul (2015) as Chijioke
- Mr. Potosky (2014) as Potosky
- Native Fowl (2014) as Ebuka
- Open & Close (2011) as Agu
- Husband My Foot (2008) as Victor
- Husband My Foot II (2009)
- Desperate Search (2007) as Peter
- Holy Man (2007)
- Holy Man II (2007)
- Holy Man III (2007)
- I Need A Husband (2007)
- I Need A Husband II (2007)
- Onitemi (2007)
- Over Heat (2006)
- Over Heat II (2006)
- Silent Burner (2006)
- The Wolves (2006) as Wesley
- The Wolves II (2006)
- Police Recruit (2003)
- Issakaba (2001)
- Corporate Maid (2008) as Dombra
- Plane Crash (2008) as Edwin
- Love Wahala (2014) as Rufus
- Hottest Babes In Town
- The In-laws (2017) as Donald
- Desperate Poor Man
- Nollywood Hustlers
- Mr Ibu Dance Skelewu
- Oga Madam
- House Of Contention
- Gamblers
- De Prof
- The Desperate Housewife
- Nneka the Pretty Serpent (2020) as Landlord
- Deep Cover (2020) as Police Chief
- Badamasi (2021) as Barrister Clement Akpamgo
- My Village People (2021) as Uncle Jakpa
- Aki and Pawpaw (2021) as Mazi Uche
- Gbege (2022)
- City Hustlers (2022)
- The Order of Things (2022) as Pato
- The Trade (2023) as Officer Amadi
- Daddy (2023)
- Sabinus the Best Man (2023) as Pastor Willy
- Adam Bol (2024)
- Aburo (2024)
- God-Dafi (2024) as Jabari's father

=== TV Series ===
- The Johnsons as Lucky Johnson. A series he took a Glorious bow after 13 ceremonious years
- Slum King (2023)

== Award and Nomination ==
Year	Award	Category	Film	Result	Ref
2023	Africa Magic Viewers' Choice Awards	Best Actor In A Comedy Drama, Movie Or TV Series	City Hustler	Nominated	

== See also ==
- List of Nigerian actors
- List of Nigerian film producers
- List of Nigerian film directors
