= Charles Okpaleke =

Nigerian businessman and film producer

Charles Okpaleke, OON
- Born: Charles Okpaleke; 14 March 1983 (age 43); Imo State, Nigeria
- Education: University of Nigeria; University of Birmingham
- Occupation: Producer
- Spouse: Ogochukwu Okpaleke
- Children: 3
- Parents: Julian Okpaleke (father); Florence Okpaleke (mother)

Charles Okpaleke, OON // (born 14 March 1983) is a Nigerian film producer. His debut film, Living In Bondage: Breaking Free won seven awards at the Africa Magic Viewers’ Choice Awards 2020, including the Best Movie (West Africa) and Best Overall Movie categories. He has also acquired the rights to remake Nollywood classics including Rattle Snake, Nneka the Pretty Serpent and Glamour Girls.

== Early life ==
Okpaleke was born to Julian Chukwuemeka Okpaleke, an Assistant Inspector-General of the Nigerian Police and Florence Ngozi Okpaleke, an attorney. Okpaleke attended Kings College Lagos and the University of Nigeria where he obtained a bachelor’s degree in 2005. He obtained a master's degree in Health Economics and Health Policy from the University of Birmingham in 2007.

== Career ==
In 2015, Charles Okpaleke acquired the rights to Living in Bondage from Kenneth Nnebue for a remake. In 2018, it was made public that the film would be a sequel instead of a remake and titled Living in Bondage: Breaking Free. Principal photography of Living in Bondage: Breaking Free took place on location in Lagos, Owerri and Durban. As the effects of coronavirus pandemic bit harder in Nollywood, Charles Okpaleke introduced drive-in cinemas in Abuja and Lagos, Nigeria. He did this in collaboration with Silverbird Group and Genesis Cinemas. Okpaleke has also acquired the rights to remake three other Nollywood classics, Rattle Snake, Nneka the Pretty Serpent and Glamour Girls through his Play Network Africa company.

== Award ==
President Muhammadu Buhari, on May 28, 2023, approved the conferment of the 2023 Special National Awards on 340 Nigerians. Charles Okpaleke was honoured for his outstanding contributions to the fields of drama and music, alongside David Adeleke (Davido) and Kunle Afolanya among others. The trio were bestowed with the Officer of the Order of Niger (OON) award.
