= Ngor Okpala =

- LGA
- Interactive map of Ngor Okpala
- Country: Nigeria
- State: Imo State
- Capital: Umuneke Ngor

Government
  - Representative: Obinna Egu
  - Local Government Chairman: Chika Ibekwe

Area
  - Total: 561 km^{2} (217 sq mi)

Population (2006)
  - Total: 159,932
  - Density: 285/km^{2} (738/sq mi)
- Time zone: UTC+1 (WAT)

Ngor Okpala is a Local Government Area in Imo State located in the eastern part of Nigeria. It is headquartered in Umuneke Ngor, and is said to have originated from Ama-Asaa. It is bounded by Ihiagwa, Owerri and Umuahia, and connects to Abia and Rivers states respectively. With a land area of 561 km^{2} (217 sq mi), it is the largest local government area in Imo State. The current executive chairman is Chika Ibekwe.

== Climate ==
With a predominantly cloudy climate, the temperatures typically ranges from 20 °C (68 °F) to 33 °C (91 °F). The area usually experiences an average humidity of 57% and a precipitation level of about 61%. Winds are generally light, blowing at around 5 km/h (3.1 mph). During the wet season, the weather is usually warm, sometimes overcast and humid. In the dry season, it tends to be hot, muggy, and partly cloudy.

== Towns and communities ==
The various towns situated in Ngor Okpala include Eziala, Obike, Logara/Obiangwu, Ntu, Ihite, Nnorie/Ohekelem and Eziama. It consists of the following communities: Nguru, Umuowa, Obiangwu, Ntu, Alulu, Amala, Alatia, Ikem, Oburu, Obokwe, Okwunola,Eziama, Ohekelem, Nnorie, Umuhu, Ihite-Okwe, Obike, Elelem, Umuohiagu, Imerienwe, Nguru-Umuaro, Orishieze, Upe, Ama-asaa, Umuekwune, Logara, Umukabia-Ogodo.

== Transport ==
The Imo Airport (officially Sam Mbakwe International Cargo Airport) is situated in Ngor-Okpala.

== Education ==
The main secondary school is the Secondary Commercial School.

== Religion ==
Ngor Okpala is a christian locality with several catholic and pentecostal churches.

== Notable people ==
- Matthew Nwogu, politician
- Obinna Egu, politician
- Henry Okoroji (born 1984), footballer
- Kelechi Eke (Ichie Ihemba 1), film director
- Enyinna Nwigwe, actor, producer and entrepreneur
- Jude Njoku, former vice chancellor of FUTO and politician
