= Living in Bondage: Breaking Free =

2019 Nigerian film

- Theatrical release poster
- Directed by: Ramsey Nouah
- Screenplay by: Nicole Asinugo; C.J. Obasi
- Story by: Nicole Asinugo
- Produced by: Steve Gukas; Dotun Olakunri; Charles Okpaleke
- Starring: Jide Kene Achufusi; Ramsey Nouah; Enyinna Nwigwe; Kenneth Okonkwo; Kanayo O. Kanayo; Muna Abii
- Cinematography: John Demps
- Edited by: Anthony Ribeiro
- Music by: George Kallis
- Production companies: Play Network Studios; Natives Filmworks; Michelangelo Productions
- Distributed by: Filmone Distributions
- Release date: 8 November 2019
- Running time: 149 minutes
- Country: Nigeria
- Languages: English; Igbo; Nigerian Pidgin
- Budget: ₦10 million
- Box office: ₦168.7 million

Living in Bondage: Breaking Free, also known as Living in Bondage II, is a 2019 Nigerian supernatural thriller executive produced by Charles Okpaleke. A sequel to the 1992 classic Living in Bondage, the film stars Kenneth Okonkwo, Kanayo O. Kanayo, Enyinna Nwigwe, and Muna Abii, with Swanky JKA in his breakout role, and Ramsey Nouah, who makes his directorial debut, playing the main villain. It received mostly positive reviews and ranked 11th overall on the list of highest-grossing Nigerian films of all time at the end of its theatrical run. The film premiered on Netflix in May 2020.

== Plot ==
Twenty-five years after the events of the original movie, Andy Okeke is now an ordained Man-of-God, having renounced his allegiance to the secret cult now known as the Brotherhood of the Six. The sect has expanded into an international organisation, with most Nigerian members who survived the 1996 Otokoto riots fleeing the country apart from Chief Omego – now an Imo state governorship aspirant – and fellow ritualist Mike Ekejimbe. The film opens with Omego's son Obinna murdering his young daughter Kosi in a forest as part of a money-making ritual, and in a nod to the original story, her spirit torments her father throughout the movie, leading to his sudden insanity and eventual suicide.

Nnamdi Okeke – Andy's secret son by his late second wife, Ego – has been raised by maternal relatives Pascal Nworie and his wife, Eunice, and shares a close bond with their son, Toby. Highly ambitious but largely unlucky, Nnamdi is unable to maintain a stable career as an advertising executive five years after graduation. Despite the disapproval of his uncle, who is aware of Omego's occult background, Nnamdi, who yearns for a luxurious lifestyle by any means possible, becomes acquainted with Omego's wife, Nneka, and her son, Obinna, who both offer to help him establish connections within the advertising industry.

During an office presentation where Nnamdi pitches his ad campaign for an upcoming rail network, billionaire tycoon Richard Williams is impressed by his ingenuity. He mentors Nnamdi professionally, and the latter is catapulted into high society status, acquiring vast wealth and recognition, but his new life comes at a price. Unbeknownst to Nnamdi, Richard is the new leader of The Six on a mission to lure him into their cult, and due to Andy's past, the Okeke lineage is eternally bound to the dark side.

Investigative journalist and blogger Uzoma grows suspicious of notable billionaires associated with mysterious murders, particularly after his sister and her daughter Kosi die in mysterious circumstances, and pays Andy a visit in search of answers. Having experienced cultism himself, Andy unsuccessfully tries to warn his son after Uzoma informs him of Nnamdi's existence to save him from The Six before time runs out. Richard eventually initiates Nnamdi, but fails to persuade Andy back into the fold. Nnamdi later regrets joining The Six, especially after falling for Kelly, whom he meets at Obinna's wedding when the latter remarries seven months after his wife's death. Richard and Omego have commanded him to present her as a sacrifice, and Nnamdi is torn between appeasing the cult and sparing Kelly's life.

Toby visits the depressed Nnamdi to get to the bottom of the latter's melancholy demeanour and passes the night at his place, but Richard possesses Nnamdi, commanding him to stab his sleeping cousin instead of Kelly. Unable to resist, Nnamdi resorts to stabbing himself instead and is rushed to the hospital, where he survives and reconciles with his biological father Andy, whom he had previously rejected. Members of The Six are arrested after a recording Obinna sent Uzoma before his suicide is used as evidence. However, Richard is able to escape, and is seen on his private jet before the ending credits roll.

== Cast ==
- Ramsey Nouah as Richard Williams
- Jidekene Achufusi as Nnamdi Nworie
- Kenneth Okonkwo as Andy Okeke
- Enyinna Nwigwe as Obinna Omego
- Munachi Abii as Kelly Nwankwo
- Shawn Faqua as Toby Nworie
- David Jones as Uzoma Adibe
- Ebele Okaro as Eunice Nworie
- Zulu Adigwe as Pascal Nworie
- Kanayo O. Kanayo as Chief Emeka Omego
- Ndidi Obi as Nneka Omego
- Bob-Manuel Udokwu as Mike Ekejimbe
- Nancy Isime as Stella
- Charlene Chisom Ignatus as Kosi Omego
- Chamberlain Usoh as himself

== Production ==
In 2015, Charles Okpaleke acquired the rights to Living In Bondage from the writer Kenneth Nnebue for a possible remake to be filmed in Europe and America as well as Nigeria. The news was later confirmed on Instagram, but the project languished in development hell for three years. In 2018, Nouah announced the film would become a sequel instead of a remake and titled Living in Bondage: Breaking Free, marking his directorial debut. Actors Okonkwo, Udokwu, Onu, and Kanayo who featured in the original, were retained.

Filming took place on location in Lagos, Owerri, and Durban.

== Release ==
A special premiere was held on 2 November 2019 at the Filmhouse Cinemas, Lagos; it was generally tagged as one of the most anticipated Nigerian films for 2019 in the media. The film had its theatrical release in Nigeria across 52 locations on 8 November 2019.

== Reception ==
=== Box office ===
The film was critically successful at box office. At the time of its release, it recorded the highest opening weekend for a Nigerian film for 2019, grossing ₦25.8 million, and the highest collection in a single day for a Nollywood film in 2019. The film also recorded the highest opening as a non-comedy film for 2019.

In its first seven days of release, the film grossed ₦48.6 million, as reported by the Cinema Exhibitors Association of Nigeria. The film collected ₦36.7 million in its second week to remain number 1 at the Nigerian box office. In the third week, the film collected ₦24.7 million, dropping to number 2, albeit having the highest weekend admissions. After three weeks it had grossed over ₦100 million. This surpassed the 2019 record set by Bling Lagosians.

In its fourth week, the film regained the number 1 spot at the box office and grossed ₦19.6 million over the week. In its 5th week, the film experienced a drop by 38% for its week-on-week gross, earning ₦12.5 million and dropping to number 4. The 6th week saw the movie drop to number 6, earning ₦5.7 million. The 7th week: over the holiday period, the movie grossed ₦5.4 million, dropping by just 6%. The 8th week saw the movie grossed ₦4.6 million, staying at number 10 at the Nigerian box office. The final cumulative stood at ₦163.4 million at the box office after 11 weeks. The film ranked eleventh overall on the list of highest-grossing Nigerian films of all time after its theatrical run. The film saw a short theatrical re-run in March, bringing its total gross to ₦168.7 million

=== Critical response ===
Living in Bondage: Breaking Free generally received positive reviews from film critics and audiences. Entertainment website Pulse Nigeria ranked it first on its list of the Top 10 Nollywood movies of the year. It received critical acclaim for its direction, cinematography, and soundtrack, with critics commending Swanky JKA's performance. Conversely, the character direction of Uzoma (played by David Jones) has been panned. Gbenga Bada of Pulse Nigeria commended Nouah's directorial execution and role as the villain; Bada also said the film sheds "more light on the existence of occult societies while entertainingly educating the general public".

== Awards and nominations ==
Year	Award	Category	Result	Ref
2020	Best of Nollywood Awards	Movie with the Best Special Effects	Won	
2020	Best of Nollywood Awards	Best Use of Make-up in a Movie	Won	
2020	Best of Nollywood Awards	Movie with the Best Editing	Won	
2020	Best of Nollywood Awards	Director of the Year	Won	
2020	Best of Nollywood Awards	Movie of the Year	Won	
2020	Best of Nollywood Awards	Movie with the Best Sound	Nominated	
2020	Best of Nollywood Awards	Movie with the Best Screenplay	Nominated	
2020	Best of Nollywood Awards	Movie with the Best Cinematography	Nominated	
2020	Best of Nollywood Awards	Best Use of Nigerian Costume in a Movie	Nominated	
2020	Best of Nollywood Awards	Best Kiss in a Movie	Nominated	
2020	Best of Nollywood Awards	Movie with the Best Production Design	Nominated	
2020	Best of Nollywood Awards	Movie with the Best Soundtrack	Nominated	
2020	Africa Magic Viewers Choice Awards	Best Overall Movie	Won	
2020	Africa Magic Viewers Choice Awards	Best Movie West Africa	Won	
2020	Africa Magic Viewers Choice Awards	Best Director	Won	
2020	Africa Magic Viewers Choice Awards	Best Writer in a Movie or TV Series	Won	
2020	Africa Magic Viewers Choice Awards	Best Soundtrack Movie/TV Series	Won	
2020	Africa Magic Viewers Choice Awards	Best Sound Editor	Won	
2020	Africa Magic Viewers Choice Awards	Best Art Director Movie/TV Series	Nominated	
2020	Africa Magic Viewers Choice Awards	Best Costume Designer Movie or TV Series	Nominated	
2020	Africa Magic Viewers Choice Awards	Best Cinematographer	Won	
2020	Africa Magic Viewers Choice Awards	Best Picture Editor	Nominated	
2020	Africa Magic Viewers Choice Awards	Best Supporting Actor in a Movie or TV Series	Nominated	
2020	Africa Magic Viewers Choice Awards	Best Actor in a Drama (Movie/TV Series)	Nominated	
2020	Africa Movie Academy Awards	Best Actor in a Supporting Role	Won	
2020	Africa Movie Academy Awards	Best Nigerian Film	Nominated	
2020	Africa Movie Academy Awards	Best Soundtrack	Nominated	
2020	Africa Movie Academy Awards	Best Visual Effects	Nominated	
2020	Africa Movie Academy Awards	Most Promising Actor	Nominated	
2020	Africa Movie Academy Awards	Best First Feature Film by a Director	Nominated	
