= Boma Akpore =

Nigerian actor and model

Boma Martins Akpore (born 23 January 1987) is a Nigerian actor and model. He became known to a wider Nigerian audience as a housemate on the sixth season of the reality television series Big Brother Naija, subtitled Shine Ya Eye, in 2021. Before appearing on the programme, Akpore had worked as a model and pursued acting. He subsequently appeared in Nigerian films including Brotherhood, A Tribe Called Judah, Lisabi: The Uprising and Suky.

== Early life and education ==
Boma Martins Akpore was born on 23 January 1987 and grew up in Yaba, Lagos, where he was raised by his mother and grandmother. He attended primary and secondary school in Lagos. In 2009, he enrolled at the University of Lagos to study Applied Science but left during his final year because of financial difficulties. He later saved money to attend film school and completed his studies.

== Career ==
=== Early career ===
Akpore began his entertainment career as a model. In 2010, Vanguard discussed his work in the Nigerian fashion industry. In 2021, Vanguard described him as a model-turned-actor and reported on his transition from modelling and football to acting, as well as his plans to work in Nollywood. ThisDay subsequently profiled him as a New York-based Nigerian actor, reporting on his plans to develop film projects in Nigeria and noting that he had recently joined the cast of an Egyptian-set feature film, Protector of the Gods. He also appeared in American television productions including The Blacklist and Law & Order: Special Victims Unit, with a background role in the SVU episode "Diss" (season 20, 2019), which featured a guest-starring appearance by Snoop Dogg.

In 2021, Akpore became a housemate on the sixth season of Big Brother Naija, subtitled Shine Ya Eye. He was introduced as an actor, model, footballer and mixologist. He was evicted from the competition in September 2021.

=== Film ===
Following his appearance on Big Brother Naija, Akpore continued his acting career in Nigerian film. In 2022, he played Sanusi in Brotherhood, a crime thriller directed by Loukman Ali.

In 2023, Akpore played Kunle in Rapacity, a drama film starring Kunle Afod. That same year, he appeared as Coaster in Késárí: The King, a crime drama directed by Ibrahim Yekini and Tope Adebayo, alongside Femi Adebayo, Odunlade Adekola and Deyemi Okanlawon.

Akpore subsequently appeared as Deji in A Tribe Called Judah, directed by Funke Akindele and released in 2023. The film became the first Nigerian film to surpass ₦1 billion at the domestic box office.

In 2024, Akpore played Raymond in Crossroads, a drama film directed by Adebayo Tijani and Tope Adebayo, starring Aisha Lawal, Deyemi Okanlawon and Lateef Adedimeji. That same year, he played Femi in the short film In Her Shoes, directed by Nehita Irieme and played Osogbenro in Lisabi: The Uprising, a historical film directed by Lateef Adedimeji. Premium Times described it as a major Nigerian historical epic. Akpore also appeared in the 2024 film Suspicion, in which he was credited as Lake Thompson. He also appeared in The Waiter, in which he played Efrebor.

In 2025, Akpore played Igimu in Suky, an action film directed by Ola Cardoso and starring Tobi Bakre, Femi Adebayo and Bimbo Ademoye, released on Amazon Prime Video. That year, he also played Lighter in Hakeem: Seeking Justice, an action film directed by Abdulrasheed Bello starring Deyemi Okanlawon, Regina Daniels and Ali Nuhu and appeared in Lisabi: A Legend Is Born, the sequel to Lisabi: The Uprising. The film was released on Netflix and featured Akpore among its cast.

Akpore has an upcoming role as L.A. in 19, a crime drama written and directed by Tola Odunsi, starring Stan Nze, Sola Sobowale, Bisola Aiyeola and Deyemi Okanlawon. The film, whose title references Section 419 of Nigeria's Criminal Code, is scheduled for nationwide theatrical release in Nigeria on 11 September 2026.

== Filmography ==
Filmography
Year	Title	Type	Role
2021	Big Brother Naija: Shine Ya Eye	Reality television	Housemate
2022	Brotherhood	Film	Sanusi
2023	Rapacity	Film	Kunle
2023	Késárí: The King	Film	Coaster
2023	A Tribe Called Judah	Film	Deji
2024	Crossroads	Film	Raymond
2024	In Her Shoes	Short film	Femi
2024	Lisabi: The Uprising	Film	Osogbenro
2024	Suspicion	Film	Lake Thompson
2024	The Waiter	Film	Efrebor
2025	Suky	Film	Igimu
2025	Hakeem: Seeking Justice	Film	Lighter
2025	Lisabi: A Legend Is Born	Film	Osogbenro
2026	19	Film	L.A.
