= Lisabi: A Legend Is Born =

- Yoruba: Lisabi a arosọ a bi
- Directed by: Niyi Akinmolayan
- Screenplay by: Niyi Akinmolayan; Yinka Olaoye
- Produced by: Oyebade Adebimpe Adedimeji; Victoria Akujobi
- Starring: Lateef Adedimeji; Adebimpe Oyebade; Odunlade Adekola
- Music by: Tolu Obanro
- Production companies: Al Notions Studios; Anthill Studios
- Distributed by: Netflix
- Release date: 10 January 2025
- Running time: 107 minutes
- Country: Nigeria
- Language: Yoruba

Lisabi: A Legend Is Born is a 2025 Nigerian historical drama film directed by Niyi Akinmolayan and co-written by Yinka Olaoye and Akinmolayan. It serves as the second installment in a two-part adaptation of the life and legacy of Lisabi, a Yoruba hero and freedom fighter from the 18th century.

The film stars Lateef Adedimeji as Lisabi, alongside a cast that includes Olayode Juliana, Adebimpe Oyebade, Olarotimi Fakunle, Olumide Oworu, Jide Awobona, Ibraheem Lateef Adebayo and Muyiwa Ademola.

Lisabi: A Legend Is Born premiered at the John Randle Centre for Yoruba Culture and History in Onikan, Lagos, on 9 January 2025, and was theatrically released in the United States on 10 January 2025 on Netflix.

== Plot summary ==
The epic story of the birth and ascent of the legendary folk hero Lísàbí Agbongbo-Akala, who is fated to lead and protect the Egba people against a deceitful ruler.

== Cast ==
- Lateef Adedimeji as Lisabi
- Olayode Juliana as Olori Alaafin
- Boma Akpore as Osogbenro
- Mo Bimpe Adedimeji as Ikeola

== Release and reception ==
Lisabi: A Legend Is Born was scheduled for release in January 2025 following the first installment, Lisabi: The Uprising. The announcement of the film generated excitement among audiences and historians, with many praising its focus on African historical narratives.

The film premiered at the John Randle Centre for Yoruba Culture and History in Onikan, Lagos, on 9 January 2025. It was subsequently released in major Nigerian cinemas and made its debut via Netflix on 10 January 2025.
