= Mr Macaroni =

Nigerian comedian (born 1993)

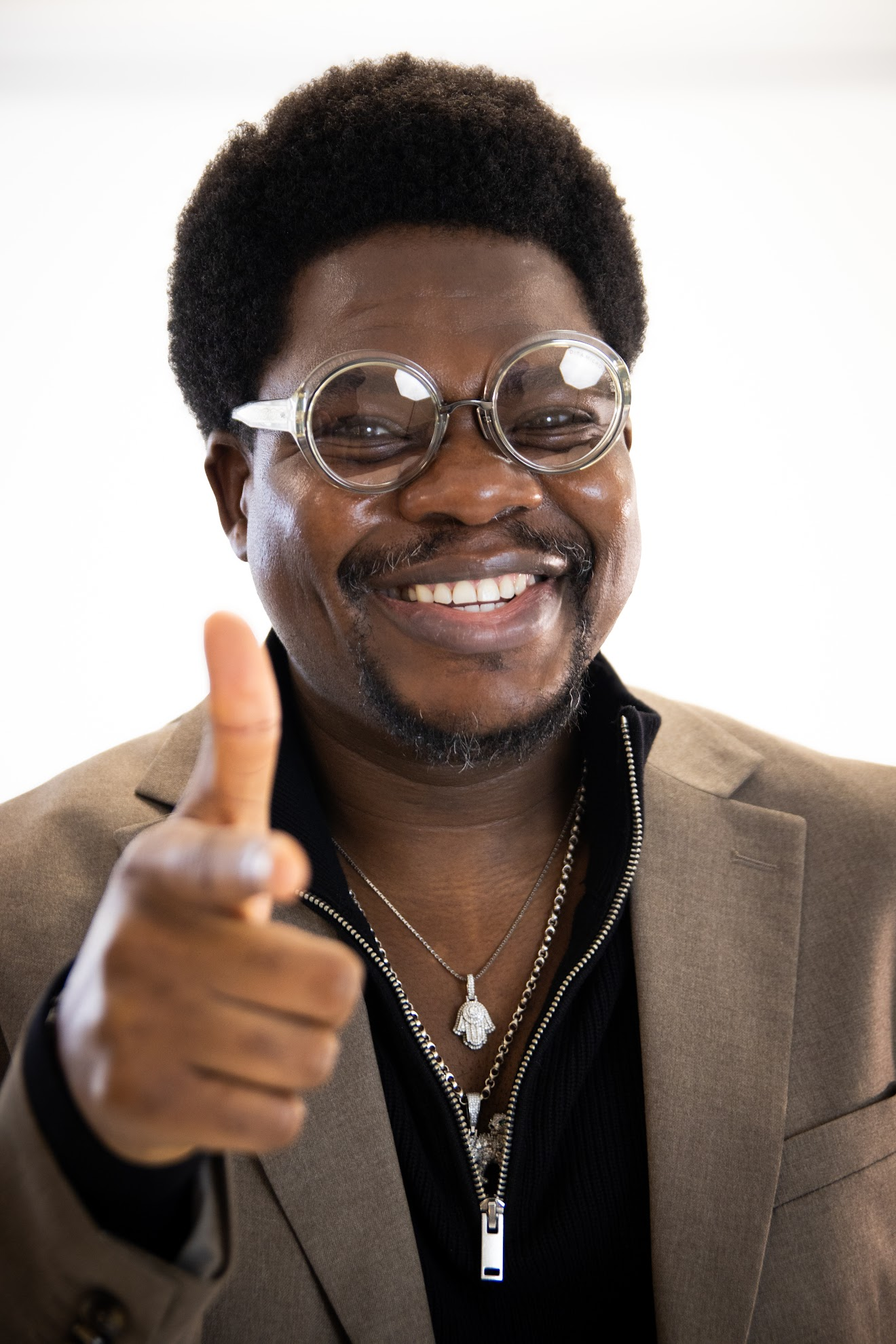
- Debo Adedayo (Mr Macaroni)
- Born: Adebowale Babatunde Adedayo; 3 May 1993 (age 33); Lagos, Nigeria
- Education: Redeemer's University Nigeria
- Occupations: Actor, Content Producer
- Years active: 2012–present
- Awards: The Future Awards Africa
- Website: mrmacaroni.com

Adebowale Babatunde "Debo" Adedayo (born 3 May 1993), popularly known by his stage name Mr Macaroni, is a Nigerian actor, comedian, and activist. He was the second highest-grossing Nollywood actor of 2025. he is known for his satirical content and roles in films like Ayinla (2021), Aníkúlápó (2022), Freedom Way (2024), and Lisabi: The Uprising (2024). He won the TFAA Prize For Acting in 2025, and was nominated for Best Supporting Actor at the AMVCAs in the same year for his performance in the Netflix film, Lisabi: The Uprising. He premiered two films at TIFF in 2024, and won Best Supporting Actor, Africa ,at TINFF. Debo has made multiple appearances on YNAIJA & Ebonylife’s annual list of The Nollywood 100, and is the recipient of two honorary doctorates awarded him in 2023.

Adedayo first gained popularity in 2019 from his satirical skits on social media, playing characters such as the philandering political figure "Daddy Wa" and a strict lecturer, "Professor Hard Life". He popularized catchphrases like "Ooin", "Freaky freaky" and "You are doing well".

He is an advocate for social and civic empowerment, and most notably was involved in the 2020 #EndSARS movement in Nigeria, when he himself was a victim of police brutality.

Since then, Adedayo has increasingly used his platform to champion social causes and frequently combines humour with civic education in his skits. In 2022 and 2023, he won the Trendupp Awards' Force of Influence award given to the "influencer or content creator who commanded the highest influence in the Nigerian social media space".

== Early life & education ==
An indigene of Ogun State, Adebowale Babatunde Adedayo was born in Ogudu, Lagos into an upper-middle-class Islamic and Christian family of The publisher of Alaroye, Musa Alao Adedayo, on May 3, 1993. He grew up in Magodo area of Lagos where he attended Tendercare International Nursery. He went to primary school in Ojota, Ogudu and later attended Babcock University High School, where he was head boy. Debo was forced to leave Lead City University due to accreditation issues after gaining admission to study law in 2009, same as in 2011 at the Houdegbe North American University Cotonou in the Republic of Benin.

Upon leaving Cotonou, Adedayo decided to discontinue his education and pursue a career in acting. In 2012, he trained to be a professional actor at the PEFTI Film Institute. After being featured in a few film and television roles, his parents convinced him to resume his education. He began studying Theatre Arts at Afe Babalola University before switching to Redeemer's University Nigeria in 2013 where he earned a degree in Theatre Arts and Film Studies in 2018. Debo announced in 2025 that he had completed the course Advanced Acting for Camera at the Royal Academy of Dramatic Art, UK.

== Career ==
=== Content creation ===
Adedayo started as an actor in Nollywood before creating comedy videos. In an interview with Punch Nigeria, he said that he had been an actor for a long time, appearing in films and soap operas. According to him, due to a shortage of the kind of roles he wanted and to avoid being typecast, he decided to start creating online comedy.

Adedayo's comedy addresses events and real issues in Africa. He has played the role of a sugar daddy. In an interview with the Nigerian Tribune, he said he chose the role because it represents a significant proportion of men who cannot control themselves.

His satirical skits highlight social and political issues such as bad governance, civic responsibility, and human rights. He typically plays the role of a sugar daddy politician known as "Daddy Wa" or a strict lecturer known as "Professor Hardlife".

Adedayo, in an interview with Punch Nigeria, said he knew he had a flair for comedy when he would mimic Pastor Chris Oyakhilome and everyone would laugh.

=== Acting ===
After gaining prominence as a comedian, Adedayo debuted on the big screen in March 2021, starring in Ponzi, a comedy film directed by Kayode Kasum, and later in the Ayinla Omowura biopic Ayinla, released in June, ending the year among the top 10 highest-grossing Nollywood actors. He next appeared as Adura in the Jade Osiberu-produced crime drama thriller Brotherhood, and as Akanji in Netflix's Aníkúlápó. Both films were released in September 2022.

In 2023, he portrayed the character Moyale in the Netflix original Yoruba epic film Jagun Jagun, directed by Femi Adebayo. He played Wemimo in Gangs of Lagos, also produced by Osiberu, and appeared in the Biodun Stephen-directed comedy Small Talk the same year. The latter earned him a Best Actor nomination at the 2024 Best of Nollywood (BON) Awards.

He returned to Netflix in January 2024, starring in his third Yoruba epic film, Lisabi: The Uprising, based on the 18th-century Lisabi Rebellion of Abeokuta. The film received 10 nominations at the 2025 Africa Magic Viewers' Choice Awards (AMVCA), including Best Supporting Actor for Adedayo.

In September 2024, he appeared in two films that premiered at the Toronto International Film Festival: The Legend of the Vagabond Queen of Lagos and Freedom Way. Freedom Way was released to cinemas across Nigeria in July 2025 and described by Variety as a film that juggles many intertwining narratives. Both films were also selected as festival entries at the Red Sea International Film Festival in Saudi Arabia. He appeared alongside Bukky Wright, Lateef Adedimeji, Timini Egbuson, and Tobi Bakre in Red Circle in June 2025. In December, he appeared in Funke Akindele's film Behind The Scenes, which became Nollywood's highest-grossing film of all time, earning over ₦2 billion at the box office. He ended the year as the second highest-grossing Nigerian actor, behind Behind The Scenes co-star Tobi Bakre.

=== Hosting ===
Alongside Kie Kie, Debo served as the official co-host of Nigerian Afrobeats star Davido's Timeless concert in April 2023. He also hosted Vibes on the Beach featuring Wizkid, Tu Baba, Timaya, and more in December 2022. Debo and Tana Adelana served as official hosts of the 12th edition of the Best of Nollywood Awards in December 2020. Also, with Kie Kie, he co-hosted the Supremacy Concert in October 2024.

== Recognition and accolades ==
While a student at Redeemer's University, Adedayo served as President of the Student Association.

In 2023, he received two honorary doctorates: Doctor of Creative Writing, Honoris Causa, from Precious Cornerstone University, Nigeria, and Doctor of Arts, Honoris Causa, from Hill City University, Benin Republic.

In February 2024, he appeared on YNaija and BellaNaija's list of The Nollywood 100, alongside Funke Akindele, Ireti Doyle, Shaffy Bello, and others.

Alongside several other emerging leaders, Adedayo participated in the United States' International Visitor Leadership Program (IVLP), held in Washington, D.C., Miami, Milwaukee, and Los Angeles in July 2024.

He won Best Supporting Actor at the 2024 Toronto International Nigerian Film Festival for his performance in Survivors.

Alongside Japanese filmmaker Shunji Iwai, Juri Ueno, Mizuki Fukumura (producer), and Tao Okamoto, Adedayo served on the jury at Japan's Short Shorts Film Festival & Asia (SSFF & ASIA) in May 2025.

In November 2025, he won The Future Awards Africa Prize for Acting, having previously won the Prize for Content Creation in 2020. He was also nominated for Best Supporting Actor at the 2025 Africa Magic Viewers' Choice Awards (AMVCA) for his performance in Lisabi: The Uprising.

In December 2025, he received the YouTube Gold Award upon reaching one million subscribers on the platform.

== Impact and Legacy ==
=== Entertainment ===
Through his platform Mr Macaroni Entertainment Debo has given many young talents opportunities in the content creation industry. He helped launch and amplify the careers of Akorede Ajayi (The Korexx), BaeU, and Kemi Ikuusedun (Kemz Mama) by giving them a platform and introducing them to a much bigger audience. He has been noted for featuring Nollywood veterans such as Pete Edochie in skit-based content. His skits have also featured Nollywood veterans including Jim Iyke, Bimbo Ademoye, Lateef Adedimeji, Sola Sobowale, Patience Ozokwor, Shaffy Bello, Mercy Johnson, Chiwetalu Agu, and contemporary artists and media personalities like Falz, Mr. P, Zubby Michael, Frank Edoho, Taooma, Oga Sabinus (Mr. Funny), Kie Kie, Remote, Broda Shaggi, and Adeyeye Enitan Ogunwusi. He has also featured industry and traditional leaders like Tony Elumelu, Obi Cubana, and the Ooni of Ife.

=== Activism ===
Debo is known for his activism, using his platforms to sensitize and advocate for youth empowerment, good governance, police accountability and civic rights and responsibilities. He often collaborates with civic organizations like Yiaga Africa for the Youth Vote Count campaign and SERAP for the My Data My Right campaign. He joined the democracy day protest in June 2021, and advocated against youth extortion by the police in October 2021. He encouraged youths to vote in the 2023 Nigerian elections. Most of his skits have been aimed at criticizing Nigerian politicians. He spoke out against several Nigerian politicians including Lagos State governor Babajide Sanwo-Olu, and in defence of Nigerian journalist Seun Okinbaloye after the minister of the Federal Capital Territory Nyesom Wike threatened to shoot him in March 2026. In 2023, he advocated for the release of detained protesters arrested and detained since October 2020.

=== Philanthropy ===
Debo has often been praised for his charitable efforts, donating sums of money to several organizations and individuals. In June 2022, he donated his PJPA-winning cash prize of $1000 for the People Newsmaker for Justice to Connect Hub NG to "support their selfless work in advocating against state violence in Nigeria". In October 2024, he partnered with Lagos Food Bank to donate food to families in low cost communities.

He donated N500,000 to the family of Jumoke Oyeleke, who was killed by a stray police bullet. He also donated N500,000 to his alma matta the PEFTI Film Institute.

== EndSARS ==
Adedayo has been active in the End SARS movement.

On Saturday, 13 February 2021, police arrested him at Lekki Toll Gate during the #OccupyLekkiTollgate protest.

After staging a sleep-in at the state house in Alausa, with Rinu Oduala and a group of protestors on 8 October 2020, Adedayo continued to lend his platform to the protests and became one of the key faces of the #EndSARS movement.

In February 2021, upon learning that the government intended to resume tolling at the toll gate, protests resumed once again under the #OccupyLekkiTollGate movement. Adedayo and numerous other protestors were arrested and savagely brutalized by the Nigerian police till public outcry forced their release.

He was subsequently picked up among 49 other protesters and arrested for defying the Lagos State directive against the protest. The protesters have since been granted N100,000 bail each and arraigned on charges bordering on flouting the COVID-19 protocol on public gatherings and ‘breaking an order not to protest’.

In October 2021, on the 1-year anniversary of the Lekki massacre, key #EndSARS figures, including Debo, Folarin “Falz” Falana, and others, led a successful drive-by event at the toll gate in memory of the massacre victims.

In November 2021, the Lagos State Governor Babajide Sanwo-Olu invited key #EndSARS figures and stakeholders to participate in a peace walk. His offer was vehemently rejected by Adedayo, who instead urged the government to implement the findings of the panel that investigated the Lekki massacre.

Alongside Nigerian rapper Falz, he led the second memorial at the Lekki tollgate in October 2022, and also the 3rd walk in 2023.

== Endorsements ==
Debo has partnered with several top and local brands, including Goldberg, Mikano, SERAP and more. In 2020, he signed on as a brand ambassador for 1960Bet. He teamed up with Goldberg alongside top Nollywood actor Odunlade Adekola and Dj Kaywise in September 2021 to celebrate Omoluabi Day with the launch of a commercial coinciding with the celebration of the inaugural edition of Goldberg Omoluabi Day at the palace of The Ooni of Ife, Oba Adeyeye Enitan Ogunwusi.

In December 2023, Debo announced that he had signed a new deal with Mikano Motors after winning The Force of Influence Award at The TrendUpp Awards alongside a brand new car. The endorsement was renewed in 2025. In October 2022, DrinksNG signed Debo on a one-year partnership to help relaunch its pre-drinks platform "Meet Me At The Liquor Store".

== Filmography ==
=== Movies ===
Year	Title	Role	Notes	Ref
2020	Doubt	Otunba	Directed by Ubong Bassey Nya	
2021	Day of Destiny	Party Crasher	Adventure / Drama / Sci-fi	
2021	Ponzi	Uchenna	Ponzi is a 2021 Nigerian comedy movie that was based on the 2016 MMM Ponzi scheme.	
2021	Ayinla	Bayowa	Ayinla is a musical film based on the life of Ayinla Yusuf, popularly known as Ayinla Omowura, an Apala musician who was stabbed to death by his manager Bayewu in a bar fight on 6 May 1980 at Abeokuta.	
2021	Crazy Grannies	Pastor Igbalode	Comedy / Drama	
2021	Lugard	Leonard	Thriller	
2021	Ejika The Tailor	Amori	Comedy	
2021	Online		Drama	
2022	The Perfect Arrangement	Oba Kalejaiye	Comedy / Romance	
2022	Flatus	CEO Williams	Comedy	
2022	Survivors	Zacchaeus	Survivors is a story about two roadside technicians battling for financial success. They ultimately ran upon a criminal named David, who taught them the ropes of kidnapping.	
2022	Kakatu	Uncle Herbert	Fantasy	
2022	Rubicon		Drama	
2022	Hammer	Pablo	Comedy	
2022	Brotherhood	Adura	Action / Crime	
2022	Aníkúlápó	Akanji	Aníkúlápó narrates the tale of Saro, a man who was looking for a greener pasture. However, due to the course of events and his relationship with the king's wife, he met his untimely death and an enigma known as Akala, a mystical bird thought to grant and revoke life.	
2022	Almajiri	Gangster	Action / Crime / Drama	
2022	Alagbara	Olofofo	Drama	
2022	King of Thieves		Thriller	
2023	Gangs of Lagos	Wemimo	Crime / Thriller Directed by Jadesola Osiberu	
2023	Ran Mi Lowo (Help Me)	Sulaiman	Thriller	
2023	World Famous	Bolaji	Drama	
2023	Lockdown Love		Romance	
2023	Jagun Jagun	Moyale	Drama / History Directed by Tope Adebayo and Adebayo Tijani	
2023	Késárí: The King	Internet	Action / Fantasy	
2023	Small Talk	Baba Dee	Comedy Directed by Biodun Stephen	
2023	Onyeegwu	Prophet	Comedy / Drama Directed by Uche Jombo & Jorome Weber	
2023	I Hate It Here	Professor Power	Drama / Short Directed by Dammy Twitch	
2024	Aiye Nika	Adediwura's bro	Drama	
2024	L.I.F.E.	Mr. Fred	Mystery	
2024	Blacksmith: Alagbede	Akala	Drama	
2024	Love & Crime		Action	
2024	Freedom Way	Abiola	Drama	
2024	The Legend of the Vagabond Queen of Lagos	Abisoro	Crime / Drama / Mystery / Thriller	
2024	Omoge Suzzy	Sir Theophilus	Comedy	
2024	Lisabi: The Uprising	Osokenu	Drama / History	
2024	Singleness is Bliss	Wale	Drama / Thriller	
2024	Atiko	Aderopo	Drama	
2025	I Am Anis	David	Drama	
2025	Trade By Bata	Wale	Comedy / Fantasy	
2025	Olùmòtàn: Stories We Are Not Supposed to Tell	MecoBeats	Drama	
2025	Red Circle	Mr A	Crime / Thriller	
2025	Gingerrr	Martell	Comedy	
2025	Son of Iron	Principal	Drama	
2025	Behind the Scenes	Johnson	Comedy / Drama Directed by Funke Akindele, Uche Mordi & Collins Okoh	

=== TV series ===
Title	Role	References
Okirika	Alaga	
Ile Alayo	Sweet Daddy	
Flatmates	AK 47	
The Johnsons	Customer	
Super Story (Donaldo)	Casper	
Far From Home	Dapo Dollars	
Ololade	Alagba	

== Awards and nominations ==
Year	Award	Category	Result	References
2018	Best of Nollywood Awards	Revelation of the Year (male)	Nominated	
2020	The Future Awards Africa	Prize For Content Creation	Won	
2020	City People Music Award	Comedy Act of the Year	Won	
2021	Net Honours	Most Popular Comedian	Nominated	
2021	Gage Awards	Online Comedian of the Year	Won	
2021	Gatefield People Journalism Prize For Africa	People Newsmaker For Social Justice	Won	
2021	Lord's Achievers Award	Prize for Creative Arts	Won	
2021	TrendUpp Awards	Force of Instagram	Won	
2022	Africa Magic Viewers' Choice Awards	Best Online Social Content Creator	Nominated	
2022	TrendUpp Awards	Force of Influence Award	Won	
2022	Budgit Active Citizens Awards	Art For Activism	Won	
2022	NEMCEA	Outstanding Performance In Online Short Comedy Creation (Male)	Won	
2022	JCI TOYP	Cultural Achievement Award	Won	
2023	The Humour Awards	Fan Favourite Award	Won	
2023	The Humour Awards	Humanitarian Comedian of the Year	Won	
2023	Social Media Awards (SMA)	The Most Innovative Use of Social	Won	
2023	Brandcom Awards	Brand Influencer of the Year	Won	
2023	TrendUpp Awards	Force of Influence Award	Won	
2023	Nigerian Comedy Awards	Best Comedy Skit Maker	Won	
2024	Best of Nollywood (BON) Awards	Best Actor	Nominated	
2024	Toronto International Nollywood Film Festival (TINFF)	Best Supporting Actor	Won	
2025	Africa Magic Viewers' Choice Awards	Best Supporting Actor	Nominated	
2025	The Future Awards Africa	Prize For Acting	Won	

== See also ==
- List of Nigerian comedians
