= Adam Songbird =

Nigerian film score composer

Aluko Damilola, professionally known as Adam Songbird, is a Nigerian film score composer, singer-songwriter and sound designer.

== Early life and education ==
Adam Songbird is a Nigerian born in Lagos State. Adam Songbird spent his childhood days in Mainland Lagos and later Lagos Island. Adam Songbird attended Ikeja High School and Federal Polytechnic Offa for his diploma in Computer Science graduating in 2006 before moving on to Lagos State University for a bachelor's degree in Computer Science graduating in 2016.

== Career ==
Adam Songbird who spent his childhood in Lagos Mainland was exposed to music like Fuji, Reggae and traditional music during his time in Lagos Island. Adam Songbird was signed under Mike Abdul's record label. During this time, Adam Songbird traveled around the country as an artiste and stage performer.

Saheed Balogun's Eti Keta which was produced in 2012 marked Adam Songbird's first film composition. In 2021, Adam Songbird made the soundtrack for Niyi Akinmolayan's The Prophetess under Anthill Production.

In 2023, Adam Songbird was nominated for the Africa Magic Viewers Choice Awards in 2023 for King of Thieves and Battle on Buka Street in the "Best Soundtrack" category.

As a singer-songwriter, Adam Songbird has a five-tracks extended play, No Strings Attached, which was well directed by Lare Sanneka, featuring Wati and Walesax.

== Filmography ==
- Eki Keta (2012)
- The Prophetess (2021)
- The Man for the Job (2022)
- League of Orishas (2022)
- Man of God (2022)
- Progressive Tailors Club (2021)
- Mikolo (2023)
- Battle on Buka Street (2023)
- King of Thieves (2022)
- Jagun Jagun (2023)
- The Origin: Madam Koi Koi (2023)
- House of Secrets (2023)
- Mikolo (sound design)
- Ada Omo Daddy (sound design)

== Discography ==
EP

- No Strings Attached

Singles

- "Lomi"
- "Awe O" featuring Wati
- "Elyon"
- "Full Control"
- "Terms and Conditions" featuring Walesax
- "Ina My Heart"
