= Lisabi: The Uprising =

2024 Nigerian film

- Promotional release poster
- Yoruba: Lísàbí: Arugbo naa
- Directed by: Niyi Akinmolayan
- Screenplay by: Niyi Akinmolayan; Yinka Olaoye
- Story by: Lateef Adedimeji; Adebayo Tijani
- Based on: 18th-century Lisabi Rebellion of Abeokuta
- Produced by: Oyebade Adebimpe Adedimeji; Victoria Akujobi
- Starring: Lateef Adedimeji; Adebowale Adedayo; Adebimpe Oyebade; Odunlade Adekola; Ibrahim Chatta
- Cinematography: Nora Awolowo
- Edited by: Ayomikun Oteju
- Music by: Tolu Obanro
- Production companies: Al Notions Studios; Anthill Studios
- Distributed by: Netflix
- Release date: 27 September 2024
- Running time: 107 minutes
- Country: Nigeria
- Languages: Yoruba; English

Lisabi: The Uprising is a 2024 Nigerian historical drama film directed by Niyi Akinmolayan and produced by Adebimpe Oyebade and Victoria Akujobi. The cast includes Lateef Adedimeji, Adebimpe Oyebade, Ibrahim Chatta, Jide Awobona, Eniola Ajao, and Adebowale Adedayo. The film follows Lisabi Agbongbo-Akala, a farmer-driven to vengeance after witnessing the brutal killing of his close friend by the Alaafin of Oyo and his ally, Songodeyi. The film is loosely based on the historic 18th-century Lisabi Rebellion of Abeokuta.

Akinmolayan co-wrote the screenplay with Yinka Olaoye, collaborating with Al Notions Studios and Anthill Studios to combine advanced motion capture and VFX. Filmed primarily in Abeokuta and Ogun State, Nigeria, the location accurately reflects the film's pre-colonial southwestern Nigeria setting and the historical resistance of the Egba people against the Oyo Empire.

Lisabi: The Uprising premiered on Netflix Nigeria on September 27, 2024, and was praised for its visuals and historical accuracy. While some critics cited uneven character development and pacing, the film reached number one on Netflix Nigeria's film chart within three days. The film has received numerous award nominations, winning three Africa Magic Viewers' Choice Awards.

== Plot ==
In late-Oyo Empire, Nigeria, Olodan ruler of the Olodan kingdom, refuses to pay the massive tributes demanded of him by the Alaafin ruler of the Oyo Empire. He is ruthlessly attacked and brought to the palace. The tributes in money and agricultural products are extracted by force from the people's own business. The Alaafin of Oyo, infuriated by Olodan's defiance, executes him as a warning to anyone who dared to defy.

Despite the Egba people's compliance with tribute demands, Sangodeyi, the ruthless head of the tribute collectors, and his brutal subordinates terrorize them. They take more than what is owed, rape young women, and kill those who resist, making life unbearable for the farmers and villagers of Egba land as their oppression intensifies.

Oshokenu, Lisabi's friend, sees something horrific when the collectors, having taken all the cash from a female merchant, carry off her daughter as well. Oshokenu's resistance of the unfairness is exposed as he rages at their brutality, yelling, "Why do you take only women? Men accompany them as well. As a punishment for disobedience, the tribute collectors mercilessly punished him by distorting his face in full public view as an exhibition of authority. Oshokenu wants to marry Abebi, a handsome, fair Egba woman, as much as he is known to be a lazy farmer. He successfully courted her with Lisabi's assistance, and Abebi consented to the marriage. But on Oshokenu's wedding day, Sangodeyi and his men target him in an effort to break his spirit. Abebi is severely raped by Sangodeyi as she is intercepted on her way to her new house. Tragically, Abebi ends her own life because she was devastated by the stress and disgrace.

After becoming enraged about Abebi's passing, Oshokenu sets out to demand revenge. He fights against the collectors and kills ten of them before he is shot and murdered. He is near death when Lisabi finds him. On his deathbed, Oshokenu begs beside his companion. Following an empathetic conversation with his dying friend, Lisabi decides to take on the responsibility of the Egba people's struggle for justice. He comes up with a plan where the farmers will appear to work together and in sync as part of a communal agricultural effort to allay suspicions by the Oyo army. However, Lisabi is secretly preparing more: to organize the Egba people for a mass uprising against their rulers.

Lisabi strategically formed the Aaro society, a communal work group that secretly fuelled the Egba uprising. As tensions escalated with their Oyo overlords, Lisabi planned a covert rebellion, leading to fierce battles where the Egba triumphed, finally achieving independence.

== Cast ==
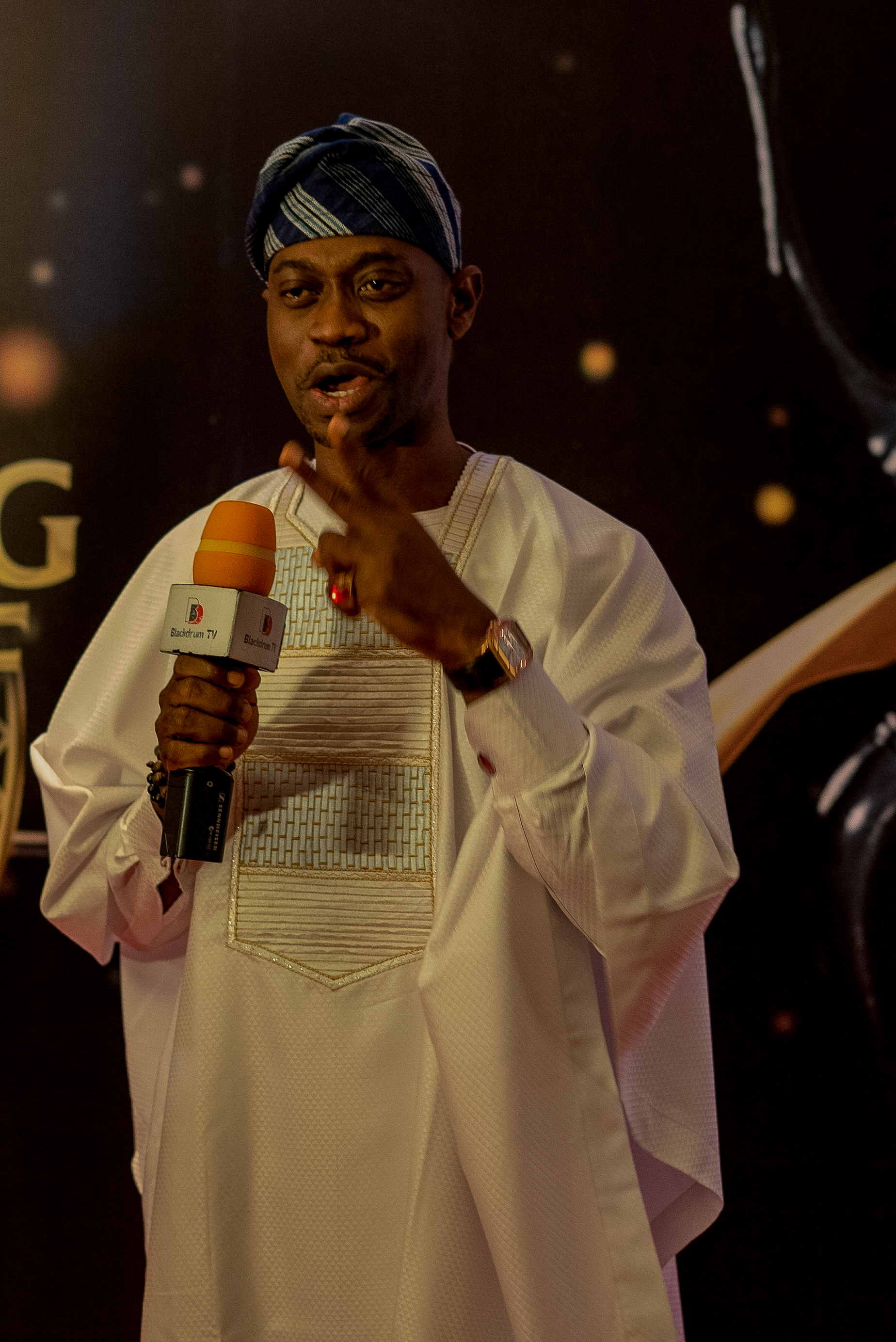
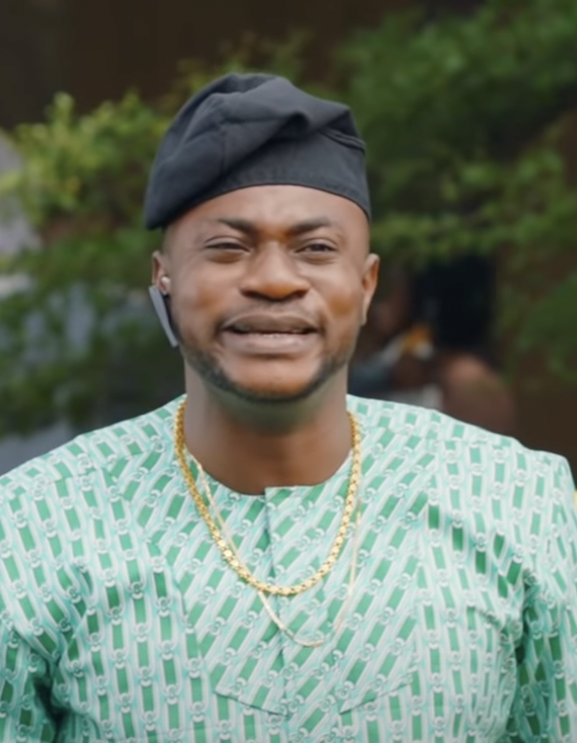
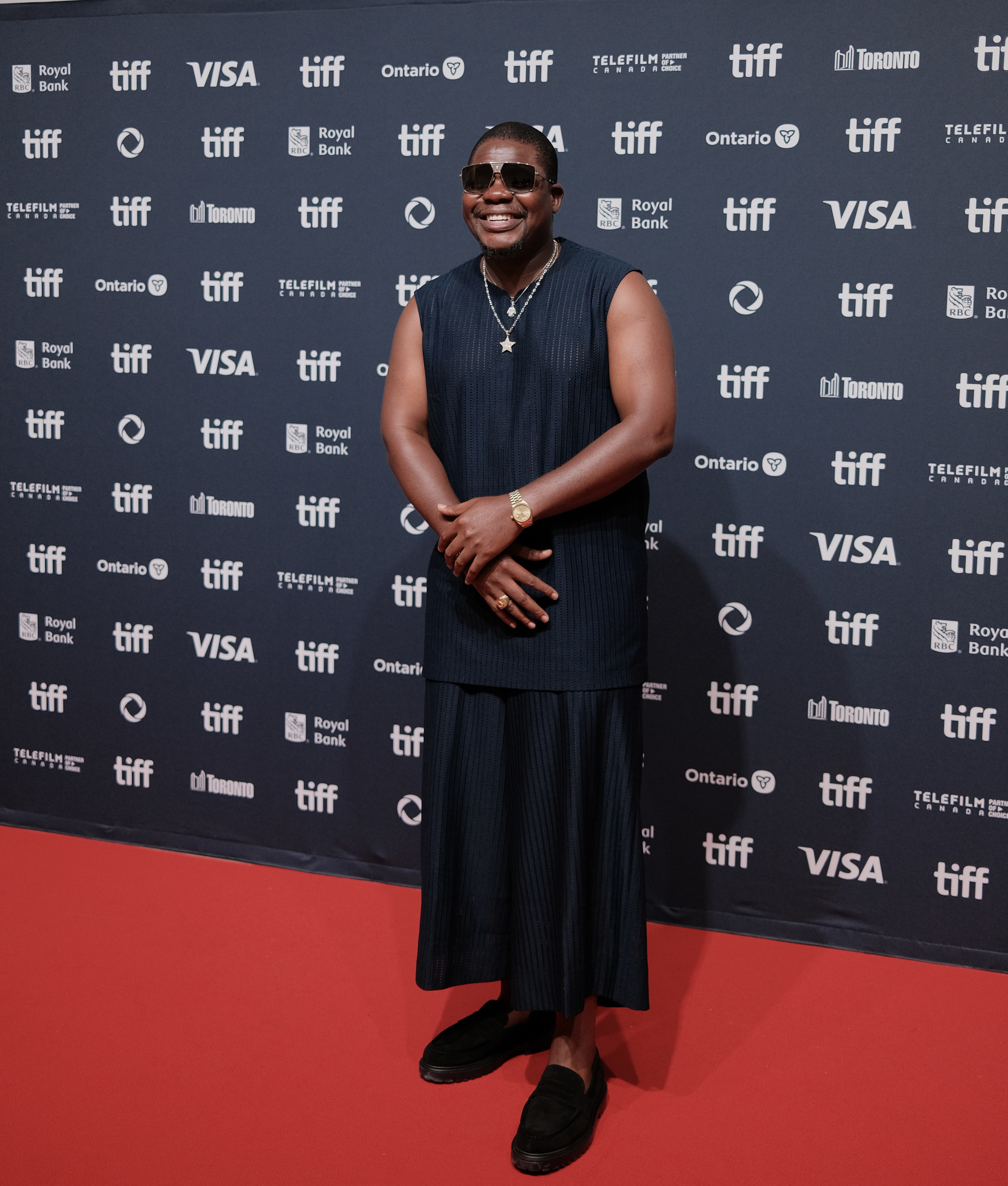
- Main characters: (left to right) Lateef Adedimeji, Odunlade Adekola and Mr Macaroni
- Lateef Adedimeji as Lisabi
- Ibrahim Chatta as Songodeyi
- Adebowale Adedayo as Osokenu
- Odunlade Adekola as Alaafin of Oyo (Oloyo)
- Femi Adebayo as Olu Olodan
- Roseline Afije "Liquorose" as Abebi
- Oyebade Adebimpe Adedimeji as Ikeola
- Ibrahim Yekini Icon as Salako
- Olarotimi Michael Fakunle as Ogunlana
- Jide Awobona as Osobande
- Gabriel Afolayan as Odunbamitefa
- Kola Ajeyemi as Akinolu
- Boma Akpore as Osogbenro
- Olumide Oworu as Bejide
- Kevin Ikeduba as Obimodede
- Seun Akindele as Oduyale
- Muyiwa Ademola as Alake
- Jide Kosoko as Onitumọ
- Atobiloye Kelvin as Akilapa
- Efe Irele as Eye
- Seun Ajayi as Olo Olori Ilari
- Damilola Ogunsi as Jogbo
- Eniola T. Ajao as Orosola
- Deyemi Okanlawon as New General (Aronimoja)
- Jaiye Kuti as Edioke

== Production ==
=== Development ===
Lisabi: The Uprising was first announced as part of a two-part epic by Netflix on September 19, 2024, marking one of the streaming service's more significant ventures into Yoruba historical drama. The first installment, The Uprising, was set for release on September 27, 2024, with its sequel, Lisabi: A Legend Is Born, released in January 2025.

The film was a product of Nollywood's "New Nollywood" trend, targeting higher production standards, culturally derived narratives, and period epics influenced by international cinema. Directed by Niyi Akinmolayan, known for combining mysticism with historical drama, the film represents a significant investment in Yoruba heritage cinema, with a budget surpassing N200 million. In the lead-up to production, Akinmolayan revealed that the original cut of the film was over three hours long. He explained that Netflix recommended splitting it into two parts so audiences would not have to sit through one extended runtime. He and co-writers (including Yinka Olaoye) then restructured the narrative: The Uprising emphasizes the beginnings of Lisabi's revolt, while A Legend Is Born handles his legacy, mythic elements, and aftermath.

The Lisabi production team had made it a priority to only use Nigerians. In an Interview with BusinessDay, Akinmolayan confirmed that the film's production crew was 100% Nigerian, offsetting Nollywood's historical dependence on foreign technical specialists.The choice was both aesthetic and political: to show that local filmmakers can deliver epic scale without external help.

Anthill Studios, Akinmolayan's production house, partnered with Netflix and Al Notions Studios to execute the project. In interviews, Akinmolayan argues that economic constraints are Nollywood's biggest challenge not creativity. The film received support from the Nigerian Film Corporation and Ogun State Governor, Prince Dapo Abiodun to help promote Nigerian history and culture to a global audience.

Story development

"After my exploits in Ayinla, I knew I had to do this to further glorify my Egba heritage. Egba people, this is for you. The entire Yoruba, Africa and Blacks worldwide, this is for you."

— Adedimeji Lateef on the motive behind Lisabi for Independent Nigeria

The production was started off as an act of passion by actor and executive producer Lateef Adedimeji, inspired by his earlier work directing the biopic Ayinla (2021) to put on screen the legend of Yoruba lesser-known heroes. Adedimeji, also cast in the title role Lisabi, wanted to educate the young generation about the likes of Lisabi, marketing the film as a ground for cultural pride and freedom. Adebimpe Oyebade and Victoria Akujobi produced the film, co-scripting the loosely based-on-fact screenplay by Akinmolayan and Yinka Olaoye on Lisabi's strategic adoption of the Aaro age-grade society for the mobilization and arming of Egba men as communal labor, and not for fighting. The film featured the villainous Ogundoyin of Ibrahim Chatta, Jide Awobona, Eniola Ajao, and Adebowale Adedayo.

"The Uprising" portrays increasing oppression since Egba farmers are taxed and harassed by the Oyo Empire, so Lisabi is driven to organize a rebellion. The Aaro society, a cooperation through communal residence, secretly reorganizes to train and recruit combatants.

=== Filming ===
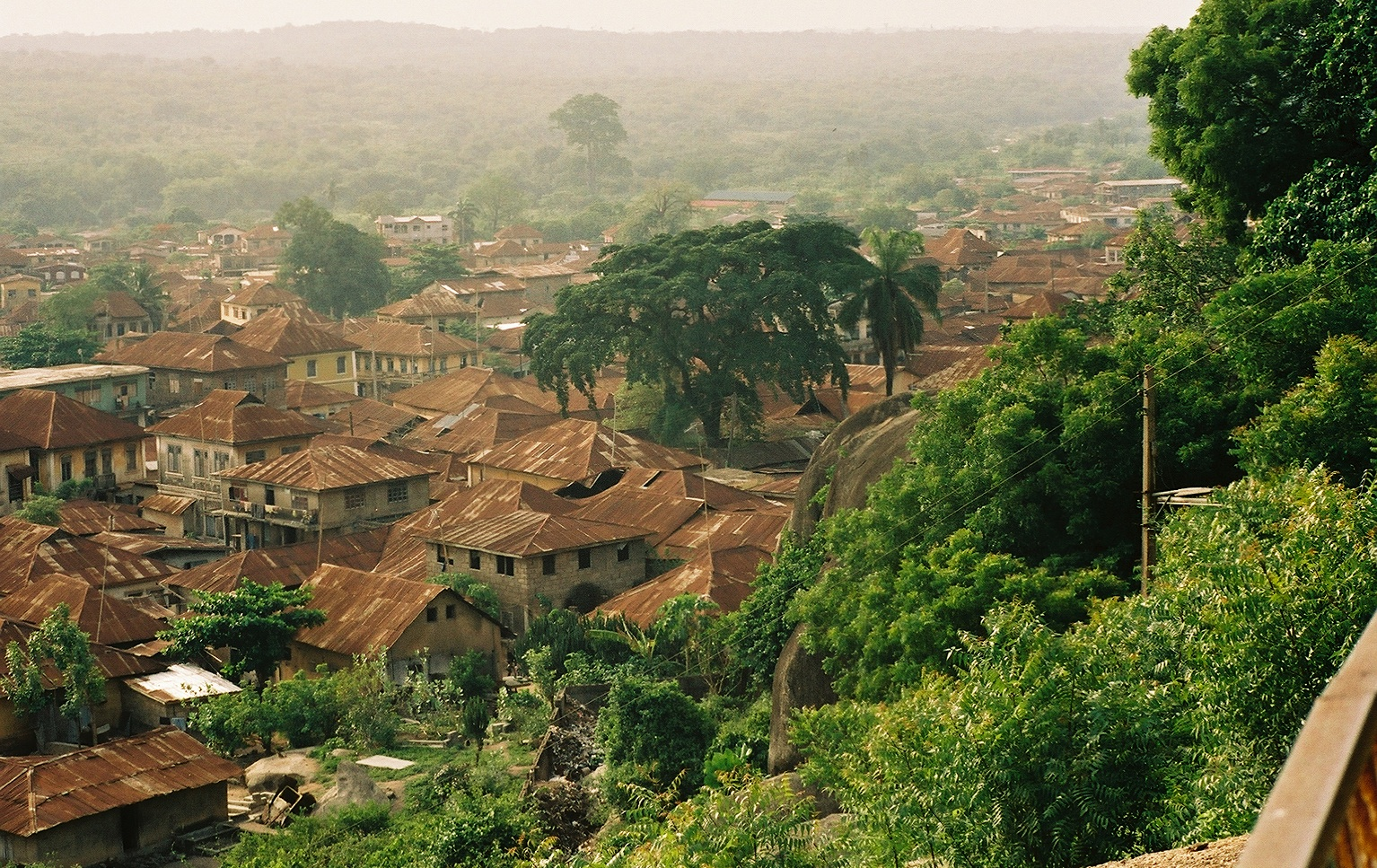
City where the filming took place

Principal photography began in February 2024, at Abeokuta and the surrounding areas within Ogun State, Nigeria, following months of pre-production and location finding in southwestern Nigeria. The movie was primarily captured in Yoruba for authenticity reasons with English subtitles added during post-production. The team built historical Egba villages, palaces, and Oyo camps from locally procured material and hand-made props inspired by 18th-century Yoruba architecture.

Production designer Abiola Ojo oversaw the creation of several sets, including the Alaafin's Palace, Lisabi's secret hideout, and the forest of Aaro, the primary location for the rebellion's training scenes. Akinmolayan noted that unpredictable weather and the rough terrain often made filming challenging, resulting in multiple scheduling changes.

=== Visual and special effects ===
Special effects for Lisabi: The Uprising were provided by Hakeem Onilogbo, making the Yoruba tribal marks and attire realistic, thus helping to establish the period look for the film. Visual effects were handled by Anthill Studios. Anthill added CGI creature design and applied contemporary visual effects techniques to accurately replicate the historical settings, enhancing the film's visual impact. The film's genre incorporates supernatural elements, such as Lisabi's spiritual powers, which Akinmolayan combined to enhance the drama; however, this has led to controversies regarding authenticity.

=== Music and soundtrack ===
Nigerian film composer Tolu Obanro was brought on board to create the score for Lisabi: The Uprising following his work on Jagun Jagun. The score was crafted using traditional Yoruba melodies, and Obanro employed various techniques to achieve a rich soundscape for the film. He noted, "Many techniques were used in mixing Lisabi's sound. I aimed for depth in all the scenes, including sound effects. There was also crowd recording and soundscaping." He further emphasized the importance of orchestration for the film's dynamic action sequences, stating, "Even silence is a form of sound; it needs proper orchestral support."

== Release ==
On 23 August 2024, Netflix announced its acquisition of the distribution rights for Niyi Akinmolayan's latest film, Lisabi: The Uprising, which was originally slated for release on 22 September 2024, at the 12 June Cultural Center, Kuto, Abeokuta, Ogun State. In the same statement, Netflix revealed that a sequel titled Lisabi: A Legend is Born was released on January 10, 2025. The film was released on 27 September 2024.

== Reception ==
=== Audience viewership ===
According to the News Agency of Nigeria (NAN), Lisabi: The Uprising became the number one top viewed film on Netflix's Nigeria film chart, a record achieved after three days of the film's release.

=== Critical response ===
Confidence Cletus of Premium Times lauded Ibrahim Chatta and Lateef Adedimeji for their portrayal of Songodeyi and Lisabi Agbongbo Akala respectively. Describing the film as one of the standout Nollywood films of 2024, he rated it 8 out of 10. TheCable's Muhibat Sulaimon rated the film 7 out of 10, describing it as a "spectacle with small flaws". Although he commended the character's performances and the film's costume design, he pointed out lack of realism in the film's Visual effects, for instance, during the transformation of Lisabi's helpmates into animals and the absence of blood flow at the beheading of Sangodeyi.

Noghama Ehioghae of African Folder rated the film 5.2 out of 10, praising the costumes and the rich cultural element and authenticity brought by the subtle inclusion of a camel. However, she critiqued the film for being more of a traditional biopic, as well as "lacked suspense and gripping moments."

=== Accolades ===
At the 2025 Africa Magic Viewers' Choice Awards (AMVCA), Lisabi: The Uprising was nominated in ten categories, including Best Overall Movie, Best Director, and Best Actor in a Drama. The film won three awards.

Year	Award	Category	Result
2025	Africa Magic Viewers' Choice Awards	Best Indigenous Language Movie (West Africa)	Won
2025	Africa Magic Viewers' Choice Awards	Best Art Direction	Won
2025	Africa Magic Viewers' Choice Awards	Best Sound Design	Nominated
2025	Africa Magic Viewers' Choice Awards	Best Movie	Nominated
2025	Africa Magic Viewers' Choice Awards	Best Makeup	Won
2025	Africa Magic Viewers' Choice Awards	Best Costume Design – Oluwatoyin Balogun and Adebimpe Oyebade	Nominated
2025	Africa Magic Viewers' Choice Awards	Best Supporting Actor – Mr Macaroni	Nominated
2025	Africa Magic Viewers' Choice Awards	Best Editing – Anthill Studios	Nominated
2025	Africa Magic Viewers' Choice Awards	Best Cinematography – Barnabas Emordi and Nora Awolowo	Nominated
2025	Africa Magic Viewers' Choice Awards	Best Lead Actor – Lateef Adedimeji	Nominated

== Historical accuracy ==
The Oyo Empire, one of the most powerful West African states at the time, exerted significant control over many neighboring peoples, including the Egba. This control was marked by heavy tribute demands and forced labor. The Egba people, residing primarily in what is now southwestern Nigeria, were subjected to various forms of exploitation by the Oyo rulers, leading to widespread dissatisfaction and a desire for autonomy.

=== The rise of Lisabi ===
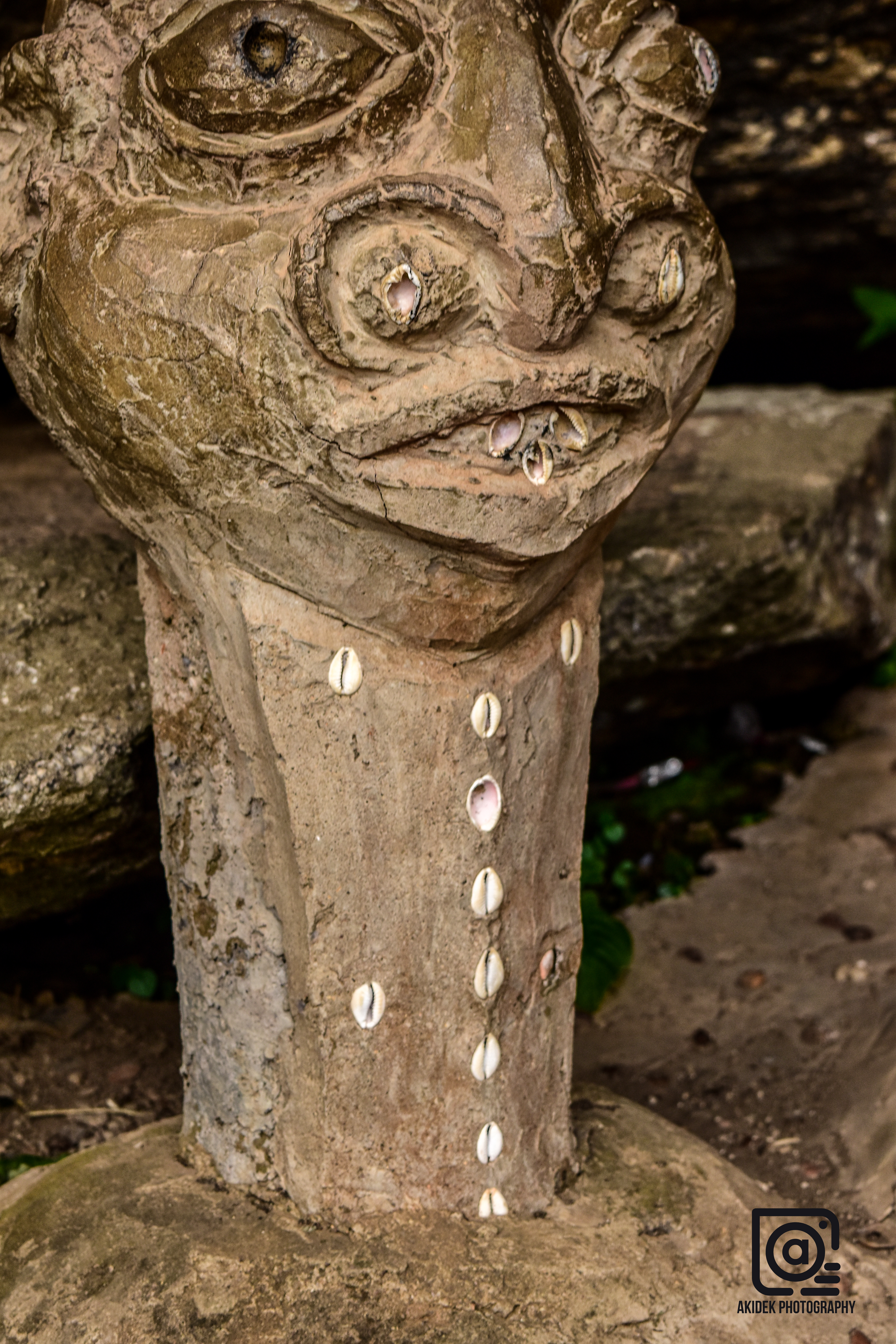
Lisabi Gbongbo Akala head statue

Lisabi Agbongbo Akala, the paramount Egba chief, was a major character during this era of resistance. Lisabi was born in Itoku, which is a ward in Abeokuta. Lisabi had been recognized as being endowed with intelligence, leadership abilities, and warfare combat capabilities. Lisabi began secretly mobilizing the Aaro, an Egba traditional age-grade association, as the nucleus of the resistance movement. Under the cover of customary communal labour, Lisabi prepared and equipped the Egba men to stage a mass revolt against Oyo rule.

=== The uprising ===
The uprising, known as Lisabi's Rebellion, was planned and executed. In a coordinated attack, Lisabi and his followers launched a series of strikes against the Oyo Empire's garrison forces stationed in Egba territory. These surprise attacks were swift and devastating, resulting in the destruction of Oyo's local power and infrastructure in the region.

Lisabi's strategy relied on guerilla tactics, which involved a combination of ambushes and hit-and-run raids, making it difficult for the Oyo forces to retaliate effectively. Within a short period, the Egba people had overthrown Oyo's control and declared their independence.

In present-day Nigeria, Lisabi is a revered historical figure, particularly among the Egba people. His story is taught in schools, and his role in Egba's history is celebrated through cultural events, monuments, and storytelling. The annual Lisabi Festival is marked by traditional music, dances, and reenactments of the uprising, serving as both a celebration of Egba heritage and a reminder of the importance of self-determination.
