= Aisha Lawal =

Nigerian actress

- Occupations: Actress, scriptwriter, filmmaker
- Years active: 2008–present

Aisha Lawal Oladunni is a Nigerian actress, scriptwriter, and filmmaker. She was nominated for Most Promising Actress of the Year (Yoruba) at the 2014 City People Entertainment Awards, Best Actress in Leading Role (Yoruba) at the 2015 Best of Nollywood Awards, Best Indigenous Language Movie/TV Series (Yoruba) at the 2016 Africa Magic Viewers' Choice Awards and Best Actress of the Year (Yoruba) and Best Supporting Actress of the Year (Yoruba) at 2018 City People Movie Awards.

== Early life ==
Lawal is a native of Ibadan, Oyo State, in southwestern Nigeria and attended Adeen International School and Federal Government College, Ogbomoso. Lawal had a passion for acting ever since she was young, where she would act in different stage plays. Lawal later attended the Lead City University, where she obtained a degree in law and a second degree in public administration.

== Career ==
Lawal attended Femi Adebayo's J15 School of Performing Arts from 2008 to 2010 and learnt how to act. Her first film was Adunmadeke where she played the role of a prostitute. She rose to fame from her role in Irugbin. Since her rise to fame, she proceeded to act in over a hundred films. She has produced up to ten films such as Imu Nika and Opon Ife.

She played supporting roles in Love Castle (2021) and the Kunle Afolayan-directed Netflix film Aníkúlápó (2022) as Olori Sunkanmi.

== Personal life ==
Lawal is from a family of three (3) children, and she is the second child. She is married with a daughter. She is a practicing Muslim.

== Filmography ==
- V/H/S/Halloween (2025) as Subject 39
- Crossroads (2024) as Eriola
- Coming to Nigeria (2024) as Debra
- Jagun Jagun (2023) as Ajitoni
- King of Thieves (2022) as Ariyibi
- Aníkúlápó (2022) as Olori Sunkanmi
- Love Castle (2021) as Head Teacher
- Survival of Jelili (2019)
- Blogger's Wife (2017)
- Simbi Alamala
- Eregun
- Jalaruru (2020) as Kikelomo
- Aiyepegba
- Apala (2021) as Adunni
- Iyawo Kan
- Okirika
- Dilemma (2022) as Lola's P.A.
- Shadow
- Nkan Inu Igi (2022) as Kiki
- Irugbin
- Adunmadeke
