= Adebimpe =

- Gender: Female
- Language(s): Yoruba

Origin
- Word/name: Nigeria
- Meaning: The crown gave birth to me complete

Adebimpe is given name. It means "The crown gave birth to me complete"

== Notable people with the name ==
- Tunde Adebimpe (born 1975), American musician, singer-songwriter, actor, director, and visual artist
- Adebimpe Oyebade (born 1997), Nigerian film actress
