= Niyi Akinmolayan =

Nigerian filmmaker, director, and media consultant

- Citizenship: Nigerian
- Education: Yaba College of Technology
- Occupation: Filmmaker
- Years active: 2010–present
- Notable work: Chief Daddy; Prophetess; The Wedding Party 2

Niyi Akinmolayan is a Nigerian filmmaker and director Known for his work in both blockbuster and independent films, He directed The Wedding Party 2 (2017) Chief Daddy (2018), Prophetess (2021), My Village People (2021), The Set Up (2019), and Lisabi: The Uprising (2024). He is the founder of Anthill Studios, a media production facility. In January 2022, Anthill Studios signed an agreement with Amazon Prime Video to stream Anthill's films globally following their theatrical releases in Nigeria.

== Early life ==
Akinmolayan was born on 3 November 1982. He is from Ondo State, South West Nigeria and is of Yoruba descent. He began a degree in engineering at the Yaba College of Technology.

== Career ==
At the beginning of his career, Akinmolayan worked as a graphic designer, website designer, and apprentice to Nollywood filmmakers, where he developed skills in video editing, animation, after effects, and visual effects. His debut film, Kajola, released in 2010, was an experiment in visual effects but was met with negative reviews from filmmakers and critics.

Akinmolayan set up his production company, Anthill Productions, in 2008, which provided the visual effects for the movie Kajola.

In 2014, he directed the Nigerian dance movie Make a Move which starred Ivie Okujaye, Tina Mba, Beverly Naya, Wale Adebayo, Victor Godfrey, Helga Sosthenes and Eno Ekpenyong. The movie was nominated for the 2015 Africa Magic Viewers Choice Awards for Best Movie (Drama). In 2015, Akinmolayan also directed the movies Falling featuring Adesua Etomi, Desmond Elliot and Blossom Chukwujekwu, and Out of Luck which featured Linda Ejiofor, Tope Tedela and Jide Kosoko. The film went on to earn Akinmolayan a nomination for Best Director at the 2016 Nigeria Entertainment Awards, and lead actress Adesua Etomi won the award for Best Actress at the 2016 Africa Magic Viewers Choice Awards. In December 2016, Akinmolayan released a short film titled PlayThing, a 3D animated movie, which premiered at the FilmOne IMAX cinema in Lagos, to rave reviews.

In 2017, his movie The Arbitration featuring O.C Ukeje and Adesua Etomi was screened at the Toronto International Film Festival. Following the film's success, Akinmolayan began a competition on his blog for prospective writers, receiving over 300 entries, which led to the production of the short film Room 315.

In 2017, due to the successful reception of Plaything, Akinmolayan produced an animated series in collaboration with Friesland Campina WAMCO Nigeria Plc, titled Adventures of Lola and Chuchu. In 2019, Akinmolayan executive produced Malika: Warrior Queen, a Nigerian animated film based on the graphic novel from Roye Okupe, writer and CEO of YouNeek Studios.

== Filmography ==
Selected filmography

Year	Title	Major cast	Role	Notes
2010	Kajola	Keira Hewatch, Desmond Elliot, Adonijah Owiriwa	Director	Feature film
2014	Make a Move	Ivie Okujaye, Tina Mba, Beverly Naya, Wale Adebayo, Victor Godfery, Helga Sosthenes and Eno Ekpenyong	Director	Feature film nominated for the 2015 Africa Magic Viewers Choice Awards for Best Movie (Drama)
2015	Falling	Adesua Etomi, Desmond Elliot and Blossom Chukwujekwu	Director	Feature Film
2016	Plaything		Executive producer	3D animated short film
2017	The Arbitration	OC Ukeje, Adesua Etomi, Iretiola Doyle and Somkele Iyamah	Director	Feature film, available on Netflix
2017	The Wedding Party 2	Banky Wellington, Adesua Etomi, Iretiola Doyle, Richard Mofe-Damijo, Patience Ozokwor, Enyinna Nwigwe	Director	Feature film
2017	Adventures of Lola and Chuchu		Director	3D animated series - 13 episodes
2018	Chief Daddy	Taiwo Obileye, Joke Silva, Rachel Oniga and Funke Akindele	Director	Feature film
2018	We Don't Live Here Anymore	Osas Ighodaro, Omotunde Adebowale David, Francis Sule, Temidayo Akinboro, Funlola Aofiyebi, Katherine Obiang	Editor	Feature film
2019	The Set Up	Adesua Etomi, Kehinde Bankole, Joke Silva, Jim Iyke, Dakore Egbuson, Tina Mba	Director	Feature film
2019	Elevator Baby	Toyin Abraham, Timini Egbuson, Yemi Solade, Sambasa Nzeribe, Broda Shaggi	Executive producer	Feature film
2021	Prophetess	Toyin Abraham, Kehinde Bankole, Stan Nze, Waliu Fagbemi, Deyemi Okanlawon	Director, writer	Sports comedy film
2021	Progressive Tailors Club	Beverly Osu, Uzor Arukwe, Funnybone, and Blessing Jessica Obasi	Producer	Satirical film
2023	Mikolo	Pamilerin Ayodeji, Fiyinfoluwa Asenuga, Yvonne Jegede, Ayo Mogaji, Daniel Etim Effiong, Femi Adebayo	Director and screenwriter	Family fantasy adventure film
2024	Lisabi: The Uprising	Lateef Adedimeji, Adebimpe Oyebade, Ibrahim Chatta, Jide Awobona, Eniola Ajao, and Odunlade Adekola.	Director	Historical drama film
