= Tolu Obanro =

Nigerian film composer

- Born: Tolulope Obanro; Ilorin, Kwara State
- Other name: Tyanx
- Education: Federal University of Technology, Minna (BSc); National Broadcast Academy
- Occupation: Film score composer
- Years active: 2019 — present

Tolulope Obanro known professionally as Tolu Obanro is a Nigerian film composer. He created the scores for Gangs of Lagos (2023), Jagun Jagun (2023), and A Tribe Called Judah (2023) which became the first Nollywood movie to hit ₦1 billion at the box office.

== Early life and education ==
Tolulope Obanro was born in Ilorin, Kwara State but spent most of his childhood in Lokoja, Kogi State where he schooled at Government Science Secondary School for his secondary school. He earned a bachelor's degree in Geology from Federal University of Technology, Minna before proceeding to the National Broadcast Academy in Lagos State.

== Career ==
Tolu Obanro worked at an oil and gas company but left the industry for music.

Tolu Obanro had previously worked in music production for gospel artists such as Mike Abdul, Kenny Kore and Monique before proceeding to music production and film scoring.

After scoring for some YouTube videos, Obanro first feature film was Your Excellency (2019) which was followed by the series King of Boys: The Return of the King in 2021.

Obanro met Niyi Akinmolayan where he began collaboration in the creation of Prophetess (2021) and Jagun Jagun (2023). He has also collaborated with Jade Osiberu for Brotherhood (2022) and Gangs of Lagos (2023) and also on Funke Akindele's Battle on Buka Street (2022).

Obanro became acclaimed for his scoring of A Tribe Called Judah (2023) which was the first Nollywood movie to hit ₦1 billion at the box office.

Obanro cites Hans Zimmer, Ludwig Göransson and M. M. Keeravani as his major influences.

== Awards and nominations ==
Year	Award	Category	Work	Result	Ref
2023	Africa Magic Viewers' Choice Awards	Best Soundtrack	King of Thieves (Agesinkole)	Nominated	
2023	Africa Magic Viewers' Choice Awards	Best Soundtrack	Battle on Buka Street	Nominated	
2023	Africa Magic Viewers' Choice Awards	Best Soundtrack	L.I.F.E	Nominated	
2023	Africa Magic Viewers' Choice Awards	Best Sound Editor	L.I.F.E	Nominated	
2025	Africa Magic Viewers' Choice Awards	Best Music/Score	Lisabi: The Uprising	Nominated	
2025	Africa Magic Viewers' Choice Awards	Best Music/Score	Seven Doors	Won	
2025	The Headies	Soundtrack of The Year	A Tribe Called Judah	Won	
2026	Africa Magic Viewers' Choice Awards	Best Music/Score	Gingerrr	Nominated	
2026	Africa Magic Viewers' Choice Awards	Best Music/Score	The Party	Nominated	
2026	Africa Magic Viewers' Choice Awards	Best Sound Design	Gingerrr	Nominated	
2026	Africa Magic Viewers' Choice Awards	Best Sound Design	The Party	Nominated	
2026	The Headies	Best Original Song for Visual Media	Behind The Scenes	Pending	

== Filmography ==
- Your Excellency (2019)
- King of Boys: The Return of the King (2021)
- Progressive Tailors Club (2021)
- Prophetess (2021)
- Charge and Bail (2021)
- Hey You (2022)
- King of Thieves (2022)
- Brotherhood
- Battle on Buka Street (2022)
- Palava (2022)
- Gangs of Lagos (2023)
- Nine (2023)
- Jagun Jagun (2023)
- Ada Omo Daddy (2023)
- House of Secrets (2023)
- Mikolo (2023)
- A Tribe Called Judah (2023)
- Crossroads (2024)

Behind the scenes (2025)
