= Detour (2021 film) =

- Directed by: Jide Okeke
- Written by: Jide Okeke
- Produced by: Jumafor Ajogwu
- Starring: Jemima Osunde; Kanayo Kanayo; Olumide Oworo
- Cinematography: Oputa Chika Emmanuel
- Edited by: Chinedum Okerengwor
- Production company: Afribold Capital
- Release date: 2021
- Country: Nigeria
- Language: English

Detour is a 2021 Nigerian movie written and directed by Jide Okeke and produced by Jumafor Ajogwu under the production company of Afribold Capital The movie was written in 2010 and was produced a decade later. It stars Jemima Osunde, Kanayo O. Kanayo, and Olumide Oworo, among others.

== Synopsis ==
The movie revolves around a journalist and a corps member who accidentally meet and reveal a massive conspiracy.

== Premiere ==
The movie was released to Cinemas nationwide on the 12th of November 2021.

== Cast ==
- Kanayo O. Kanayo
- Monalisa Chinda
- Jemima Osunde as Tari
- Olumide Oworu as Alex
- Tomiwa Tegbe as Seyi
- Uzor Osimpka
- Brutus Richards
