= Ibrahim Chatta =

Nigerian film actor and director

- Born: 13 October 1970 (age 55); Bacita
- Citizenship: Nigeria
- Occupation: Actor

Ibrahim Chatta (born 14 October 1970) is a Nigerian actor, producer, and director.

== Early life and career ==
Chatta was born in Bacita, Edu Local Government Area, Kwara State, Nigeria. He grew up in a large family with 14 siblings. His mother, originally from Modakeke in Osun State, dying after a prolonged battle with diabetes. His father is also deceased. Before becoming an actor, Chatta worked as a bus driver to support himself and his family. He began his career in theatre, where he developed his acting skills, before transitioning to film. His breakthrough in Nollywood came with his role in the film Aiyekooto, produced by Sharafadeen Olabode and directed by Adebayo Tijani.

== Filmography ==
- Atini O’go (2006)
- Mafi wonmi (2008)
- Olo (2008)
- Mafi sere (2009)
- Orere laye (2009)
- Ebere Adigun (2010)
- Aiyekooto (2012)
- Ifa Iwa (2013)
- Olokiki Oru: The Midnight Sensation (2019)
- Omoyagba (2020)
- Alabe
- King of Thieves (2022)
- Òsòròngà (2023)
- Jagun Jagun (2023)
- Lisabi: The Uprising (2024)

== Awards and nominations ==
- Best Actor in a Supporting Role at the 2012 Best of Nollywood Awards (BON).
- Best Supporting Actor in a Yoruba Film (Ifa Iwa) at the 2013 Best of Nollywood Awards (BON).
- Best Actor of the Year (Yoruba), City People Movies Awards, 2019.
- Legend of the year award at Odunlade Adekola Film Production Awards (OAFP) in 2024.
