= The Waiter (2024 film) =

Film produced by Ayo Makun

- Release poster
- Directed by: Toka Mcbaror
- Screenplay by: Anthony Kehinde Joseph
- Story by: Ayo Makun
- Produced by: Darlington Abuda
- Starring: Ayo Makun; Deyemi Okanlawon; Shaffy Bello; Regina Daniels; Rahama Sadau
- Cinematography: Oputa Chika Emmanuel
- Edited by: Patrick Odjegba
- Production company: Corporate World Entertainment
- Distributed by: Silverbird Distribution
- Release date: December 20, 2024
- Running time: 106 minutes
- Country: Nigeria
- Language: English

The Waiter is a 2024 Nigerian action comedy film directed by Toka Mcbaror and produced by Darlington Abuda. Written by Anthony Kehinde Joseph and Ayo Makun who also serves as executive producer and plays the lead role as Akpos. it stars an ensemble cast including Deyemi Okanlawon, Shaffy Bello, Regina Daniels, Bucci Franklin, Uchemba Williams, Rahama Sadau, and Toke Makinwa. a struggling man from Warri who accepts a temporary job as a waiter at the upscale Crystal View Hotel. During a high-level government function, he unexpectedly becomes caught in a hostage crisis.

In the film, Akpos (Makun), a struggling man from Warri who accepts a temporary job as a waiter at the upscale Crystal View Hotel. During a high-level government function, he unexpectedly becomes caught in a hostage crisis.

The Waiter was theatrically released in Nigeria on December 20, 2024, by Silverbird Distribution. The film received critical acclaim and has grossed over ₦300 million Nigerian Box Office, Joining the list of highest grossing Nigerian film.

== Plot ==
Akpos an unemployed man with little means to support himself. In search of temporary employment, he takes a position as a waiter at the Crystal Hotel which is hosting a gathering of government officials, business people, and international visitors for the inauguration of a new government poverty alleviation program. While hoping that this position will provide him with some income, Akpos is unaware that a terrorist group, headed by Tonye Bright and equipped with weapons, intends to hijack this event.

Once the terrorists take control of the building and kill security people and take the guests hostage, their goal becomes clear. They intend to make the government release one of their members who is currently held in detention and to disclose the names of corrupt officials involved in the theft of money meant for the poor citizens.

In the process of avoiding the terrorists, Akpos notices that his position enables him to travel across the hotel through its service corridors, which are not known to the terrorists. Having discovered that he can provide information to the security forces waiting outside and deliver supplies to the hostages, Akpos begins to sabotage the terrorists' activities without any fighting skills. In spite of his fear, he earns the confidence of both the hostages and the security operatives.

The hostages' attempts to escape create further tension and a conflict within the terrorist group which Akpos uncovers. The truth is that some government officials who were attending this meeting have hidden documents about the corruption associated with the program of poverty alleviation. Still, more violence only puts innocent people's lives in danger and negotiations cease to be successful. Security operatives begin a raid on the hotel.

Together with the law enforcement agencies, Akpos rescues the hostages from the hotel. He confronts Tonye Bright and beats him then rescuring the remaining hostages. After the hostages are saved and the government is blamed for its participation in the corruption, Akpos is recognized as a hero whose bold actions have prevented a tragedy. He goes back to his ordinary life and receives praise for what he has done.

== Cast ==
- Ayo Makun as Akpos
- Regina Daniels as Idara
- Deyemi Okanlawon as Femi Aina
- Shaffy Bello as Mrs. Okon Edet
- Bucci Franklin as Tonye Bright
- Chris Attoh as Virgil Lane
- Rahama Sadau as Farida
- Williams Uchemba as Comrade Caesar
- Toke Makinwa as Inspector Zika
- Boma Akpore as Efrebor
- Kenneth Applegate as American Newscaster
- April Chidinma as Segilola
- Gregory Ojefua as Agent Soji
- Richard Mofe-Damijo
- Tanya Price as American Newscaster
- Kunle Remi as Superintendent Winston
- Sunshine Rosman as Nwando
- Uzee Usman as Hillary
- May Yul-Edochie
- Dino Melaye
- Shine Rosman

== Release ==
The Waiter premiered on December 14, 2024 in Lekki, Lagos, as part of Entertainment Week Lagos 2024. It was released in Nigerian cinemas on December 20, 2024, followed by a theatrical release in the United Kingdom and the United States on January 31, 2025.

== Reception ==
Nigerian box office performance

Following its release in Nigerian cinemas on December 20, 2024, The Waiter earned ₦218.6 million within its first two weeks, making it one of the top-performing Nollywood films during the holiday season. By January 15, 2025, the film had grossed ₦305.1 million, according to reports from Nairametrics, News Central Africa, and Shock NG. This achievement placed it as the 11 highest grossing Nigerian film of all time, alongside titles such as Alakada: Bad and Boujee and Everybody Loves Jenifa, the latter of which has surpassed ₦1.6 billion in earnings, based on the official list of highest-grossing Nigerian films.

=== Critical reception ===
The Waiter received mixed-to-negative reviews from critics. Vivian Nneka Nwajiaku writing for Afrocritik, described The Waiter as a "restlessly awkward action comedy thriller," which lacks proper blending of genres. Nwajiaku commended the performance of Bucci Franklin playing Tonye Bright, the terrorist, as the best actor in the film. However, Nwajiaku condemned the fact that the screenplay did not give prominence to Akpos, considering the fact that he is the lead character in the film. Nwajiaku further noted that the film was a demonstration of the irrelevancy of Akpos character. In a similar review by Ayodele Olawumi of What Kept Me Up, he noted that the film had potential but faulted its execution, stating that the film seemed interesting in concept but poorly executed. According to Olawumi, the story became progressively less believable because of loose ends and too many characters. However, he praised Bucci Franklin’s acting as well as Kunle Remi’s sense of humor. Toka McBaror of Premium Times commended its ambition in blending action and comedy as well as its commentary on corruption and poverty, but concluded that these themes were undermined by an uneven screenplay and inconsistent storytelling. Muhibat Sulaimon, of TheCable Lifestyle found the themes of corruption, poverty, and inequality relevant but criticized the film for failing to develop the characters, having plot holes, and using cameo appearances by celebrities without adding value to the story. He rated the movie 4.5/10.
