= The New Patriots =

2020 Nigerian political drama film

- Directed by: Adebayo Tijani; Terry Ayebo
- Screenplay by: Niji Akanni
- Story by: Rotimi Adelola, inspired by Patriots and Sinners, a novel written by Nnenna Ihebom
- Produced by: Rotimi Adelola
- Starring: Akin Lewis; Lateef Adedimeji; Bimbo Oshin; Dele Odule; Taiwo Ibikunle
- Cinematography: Lukman Abdulrahman
- Distributed by: Bluepictures Film Distribution
- Release dates: December 2020 (Venezuela); 2 June 2021 (TAFF (US)); 11 June 2021 (Nigeria)
- Running time: 103 minutes
- Country: Nigeria
- Languages: English; Yoruba

The New Patriots is a 2020 Nigerian political drama film directed by Adebayo Tijani and Terry Ayebo, starring Akin Lewis, Lateef Adedimeji, Bimbo Oshin, Dele Odule, and Taiwo Ibikunle. It was selected for screening at several international film festivals, and was nominated for a number of awards, winning two at the Five Continents International Film Festival.

== Synopsis ==
The film is a political thriller that celebrates youth participation in the democratic process.

== Cast ==
- Akin Lewis as Dr. Nathaniel Olubo
- Lateef Adedimeji as Fred
- Bimbo Oshin as Princess Gladys Olubo
- Dele Odule as Chief Balogun
- Taiwo Ibikunle as Chief Yagaz
- Adebimpe Oyebade as Atilola Olubo
- Damipe Adekoya as Simisola Olubo
- Motilola Adekunle as Dr. Bibi Agba
- Jibola Soyele as Jibola
- Kemisola Isijola as Sewa
- Bimbo Sunday as Ahmed
- Adedeji Odundun as Alex

== Production ==
The New Patriots was directed by Adebayo Tijani and Terry Ayebo. It was produced by Rotimi Adelola, from a screenplay (in English) by Niji Akanni and translated to Yoruba by Oluwayemisi Adebowale.

The story was written by Rotimi Adelola, inspired by Patriots and Sinners, a novel written by Nnenna Ihebom. The script contributors include Tunde Kelani, Rotimi Adelola, Niji Akanni, Muritala Sule, film director Dami Taiwo and Jibola Soyele.

== Release ==
The New Patriots was officially selected for screening in several international film festivals:

- 2020 Five Continents International Film Festival, Venezuela. It is the only feature film from Africa to be selected for that edition of the festival.
- 2021 Montreal Independent Film Festival, Canada
- The African Film Festival (TAFF) 2021, US
- Toronto International Nollywood Film Festival (TINFF) 2021, Canada

== Reception ==
The film received positive reviews from critics.

== Accolades ==
The film received an Honourable Mention at the 2021 Berlin Flash Film Festival, Germany.

=== Awards and nominations ===
Year	Film Festivals	Category	Recipient	Result	Ref
2021	Five Continents International Film Festival	Best Action Feature Film	The New Patriots	Won	
2021	Five Continents International Film Festival	Best Lead Actor in a Feature Film	Lateef Adedimeji	Nominated	
2021	Five Continents International Film Festival	Best Lead Actress in a Feature Film	Damipe Adekoya	Won	
2021	Five Continents International Film Festival	Best Production Feature Film	Rotimi Adelola	Nominated	
2021	Toronto International Nollywood Film Festival (TINFF)	Best Film - African	The New Patriots	Nominated	
2021	Toronto International Nollywood Film Festival (TINFF)	Best Drama - Nollywood	The New Patriots	Nominated	
2021	Toronto International Nollywood Film Festival (TINFF)	Best Movie Trailer	The New Patriots	Nominated	
2021	Toronto International Nollywood Film Festival (TINFF)	Best Movie Producer - Africa	Rotimi Adelola	Nominated	
