= Alaroye =

Weekly Yoruba language newspaper

- Founded: May 1985
- Language: Yoruba
- Headquarters: Lagos
- Country: Nigeria
- Website: www.alaroye.org

Alaroye is a weekly newspaper published in Nigeria in the Yoruba language by Musa Alao Adedayo of the World Information Agents Lagos. Alaroye means 'the explainer' in Yoruba.

== Background ==
The first edition of Alaroye was produced in May 1985. The publisher was 25 years old, working as a newscaster with the Nigerian Television Authority, NTA Channel 10, Lagos. The first experiment lasted only a few editions, being published single-handedly by its creator, and was not able to become financially sustainable. A second effort was made in 1990 to resuscitate the newspaper, which was published but could not be circulated because its launching where the publisher expected to raise some money for continuous publishing was aborted. And it was again unsuccessful. In 1994, Adedayo came out again with his paper. This time, it came out successfully for four weeks before it collapsed due to lack of funding, and funding a newspaper seemed to be beyond the reach of the publisher. Alaroye became dormant until July 2, 1996, when it resurfaced in its current form. With better planning, enough resources and a post-graduate diploma in journalism, Adedayo was able to ensure Alaroye became a viable publication.

== Impact ==
At the time of the political imbroglio in Nigeria after the annulment of the 1993 presidential election, (popularly thought to have been won by a Yoruba man, Chief MKO Abiola), Alaroye was at the forefront of the agitation for the declaration of the election results and the restoration of the mandate Nigerians had given to Abiola. This political impasse with a Yoruba person as the central figure, and the neutrality of reporting and analyzing the situation, resulted in the increased circulation of the paper to around 150,000 copies per week, competing favourably with other national dailies such as Punch and The Guardian.

It was considered as the new innovation in community reportage and strict adherence and application of the basic tenets of professional journalism, coupled with the publisher's discipline and managerial acumen makes Alaroye stand out among other Yoruba newspapers. There are many others that came after it but could not survive the competitive and volatile newspaper market in Nigeria.

As a result of the success of Alaroye, publications expanded to include other titles, such as Iriri Aye Alaroye, a human angle stories monthly magazine and Akede Agbaye, which is a weekly entertainment magazine popular among Celebrities (Nollywood artists, Juju, Fuji, Apala, Christian and Muslim singers).

In recognition of Alaroye's role as both preserver of the Yoruba language and its popularity with the community, Nigerian Minister of Information and Culture, Mr. Lai Muhammed paid a courtesy visit to its office in Ikosi-Ketu Lagos in February 2016 as part of the government's efforts to partner with the publication to publicize government policies at the grassroots level.

The publisher, Musa Alao Adedayo, has also authored the books Crude Journalism: The History of Alaroye and African Indigenous Language Newspaper (2006) and Lateef Adegbite: A life for The People (2006). The Publisher is also the father of Nigerian actor and comedian, Adebowale "Debo" Adedayo a.k.a Mr. Macaroni.
