= Red Circle (2025 film) =

2025 Nigerian film

- Directed by: Akay Mason
- Written by: Abdul Tijani-Ahmed
- Produced by: Nora Awolowo; Abdul Tijani-Ahmed
- Starring: Folu Storms
- Cinematography: Nora Awolowo
- Edited by: Ayomikun Oteju
- Music by: Tolu Obanro
- Release date: June 6, 2025
- Running time: 119 minutes
- Country: Nigeria

Red Circle is a 2025 Nigerian crime-thriller film directed by Akay Mason and produced by Nora Awolowo under Rixel Studios. The film features Bukky Wright, Lateef Adedimeji, Timini Egbuson, and Tobi Bakre. It premiered in cinemas on June 6, 2025.

== Plot ==
The story follows Fikayo Holloway, a journalist from a wealthy family of socialites in Lagos. Driven by a desire to forge her own path, Fikayo becomes entangled in an investigation that brings her dangerously close to a powerful crime ring operating in the city. As she uncovers the syndicate’s activities, the consequences begin to affect her personal life, forcing her to make difficult choices and confront threats that hit close to home.

== Cast ==
- Bukky Wright
- Lateef Adedimeji
- Timini Egbuson
- Tobi Bakre
- Folu Storms
- Femi Branch
- Debo Adedayo (Mr Macaroni)
- Omowunmi Dada
- Ruggedman
- Mike Afolarin
