= Jagun Jagun =

2023 Yoruba language film

- Directed by: Tope Adebayo; Adebayo Tijani
- Produced by: Femi Adebayo
- Starring: Femi Adebayo; Lateef Adedimeji; Faithia Balogun; Bukunmi Oluwasina; Ibrahim Yekini; Bimbo Ademoye; Odunlade Adekola
- Edited by: Dolapo Adigun
- Music by: Tolu Obanro
- Production company: Euphoria360 Media
- Distributed by: Netflix
- Release date: August 10, 2023
- Country: Nigeria
- Language: Yoruba

Jagun Jagun (The Warrior) is a 2023 Netflix original Yoruba film produced by Femi Adebayo Salami and Euphoria360 Media. It was directed by Adebayo Tijani and Tope Adebayo Salami. The film stars Femi Adebayo, Adedimeji Lateef, Bimbo Ademoye, Faithia Balogun, Mr Macaroni, Bukunmi Oluwasina, Ibrahim Yekini and Muyiwa Ademola. It was released on Netflix on 10 August 2023. It won the Best Indigenous Language Movie (West Africa) and the Best Costume Design award category at the 2024 Africa Magic Viewers' Choice Awards. It snagged 7 nominations in the 2024 Africa Movie Academy Awards and then went on to win 3 awards, including Achievement in Makeup and Achievement in Visual Effects, and Femi Adebayo went home with the Best Actor in a Supporting Role award. Adebayo also went ahead to win Outstanding Male Actor in the 2024 Abuja International Film Festival.

== Synopsis ==
Jagun Jagun tells the story of a warlord, Ogundiji, who begins to feel threatened by the potential of a young warrior, Gbotija, whose main aim is to avenge the death of his father. Ogundiji has always been a dictator who has succeeded in taking over various kingdoms, but he is soon threatened by the arrival of the young warrior, Gbotija.

== Cast ==
- Femi Adebayo as Ogundiji
- Lateef Adedimeji as Gbotija
- Odunlade Adekola as Jigan
- Ibrahim Yekini as Gbogunmi
- Bukunmi Oluwasina as Kitan / Agemo
- Adebayo Salami (Oga Bello) as Oba Alayaki
- Fathia Balogun as Erinfunto
- Bimbo Ademoye as Morohunmbo
- Dayo Amusa as Ajepe
- Mr Macaroni as Moyale
- Yinka Quadri as Amoye
- Tope Adebayo as Arakunri
- Akinsanmi Adura as Okineto's Prince
- Kola Ajeyemi as Modede Prince
- Bose Akinola as Okineto's Wife
- Olutayo Amokade as Alabi
- Adeoye Adeyem Elesho as Wehinwo
- Ibrahim Chatta as Ikulende Agbarako
- Kunle Afod as Ditemola
- Yemi Elesho (Alfa Ebenezer)
- Muyiwa Ademola as Oniketo
- Aisha Lawal as Ajitoni
- Dele Odule as Alarinka
- Ayo Ajewole (Woli Agba) as Agbeloba
- Soji Taiwo as Modede Prince's Friend

== Production and release ==
Jagun Jagun was filmed over a month's duration in southwestern Nigeria. Actress Bukunmi Oluwasina disclosed that she was selected by Femi Adebayo Salami for her role in the film a year before production started. She also praised the production of the movie, describing the project as a "monumental undertaking".

Femi Adebayo who also produced King of Thieves, said that the dream of Jagun Jagun was to surpass the success and achievements recorded by King of Thieves.

On 10 August 2023, Jagun Jagun was released on Netflix to critical acclaim. Within 48 hours of release, it began trending in the United Kingdom and seventeen other countries. It earned 2,100,000 views in its first three days, and 3,700,000 views by 20 August 2023, making it one of the top 10 most-watched non-English films globally during that period.
