= Ijakumo =

- Promotional poster
- Directed by: Adebayo Tijani; Steve Sodiya
- Written by: Kehinde Joseph
- Story by: Toyin Abraham
- Produced by: Toyin Abraham
- Starring: Toyin Abraham; Kunle Remi; Lolade Okusanya; Bimbo Akintola; Olumide Oworu
- Cinematography: Idowu 'Mr Views' Adedapo
- Edited by: Steve Sodiya; Agboola Ola'Kazeem
- Music by: Abosede Peace
- Production company: Toyin Abraham Films Production
- Distributed by: FilmOne Distribution
- Release date: 23 December 2022
- Running time: 120 Minutes
- Country: Nigeria
- Languages: English, Yoruba, Igbo, Hausa
- Box office: ₦278,496,384

Ijakumo: The Born Again Stripper is a 2022 Nigerian suspense thriller film directed by Adebayo Tijani and Steve Sodiya, and written by Kehinde Joseph. The film stars Toyin Abraham, Kunle Remi, Lolade Okusanya, Bimbo Akintola, Olumide Oworu, and Lillian Afegbai joining the ensemble cast. The film explores themes of deception, revenge, and redemption, set against the backdrop of a complex love triangle and societal hypocrisy.

== Plot ==
Asabi and Jide were once lovers, but their relationship took a dark turn when Jide, consumed by greed, decided to rid himself of Asabi and their unborn child. He attempted to kill her, unaware that Asabi was the daughter of a powerful spiritualist determined to bring about his downfall.

Jide, now Pastor Olajide, leads one of the nation's most prominent churches but secretly lives a double life. He is a member of a clandestine organization called The Syndicate, engaging in sinful acts that contradict his pastoral image.

Haunted by the traumatic events caused by Jide, Asabi seeks revenge by plotting to ruin his reputation and dismantle The Syndicate. To achieve her goal, she enlists the help of Sharon, a stripper who also happens to be a choir member at Jide's church and the object of his forbidden desires. Sharon uses her seductive charm to infiltrate Jide's life and gain his trust.

Through her deception, Sharon successfully acquires a thumb drive containing incriminating secrets about The Syndicate. With the drive in her possession, Asabi orders the stolen funds in The Syndicate's bank accounts to be distributed to their victims. The exposure of these secrets sends shockwaves through the organization, forcing its members to flee.

Unaware of the breach, Jide soon discovers that The Syndicate has traced the leak back to him. Realizing the severity of the situation, he kidnaps Sharon, hoping to extract the location of the thumb drive through torture. However, during a tense confrontation, Jide's brother informs him that the woman he has captured is not Sharon but Mary, her identical twin.

This revelation shifts the narrative, as Mary, a devout choir singer, is entirely innocent. Meanwhile, Sharon secretly texts Asabi about her predicament, prompting Asabi to prepare for a decisive confrontation. What follows is a dramatic showdown between Asabi and Jide, culminating in a battle of vengeance, secrets, and redemption.

== Selected cast ==
- Toyin Abraham as Asabi
- Kunle Remi as Pastor Jide
- Lolade Okusanya as Sharon and Mary
- Olumide Oworu as young Jide
- Debbie Shokoya as young Asabi
- Bimbo Akintola as Madam Olanitemi
- Kolawole Ajeyemi as Kayinsoro
- Lilian Afegbai as Jumoke
- Antar Laniyan
- Eso Dike
- Tomiwa Tegbe
- Deborah Ajijolajesu Shokoya

== Production and release ==
The premiere of the film, which was themed "Sunday Best," was attended by the governor of Lagos State, Babajide Sanwo-Olu, as well as Odunlade Adekola, Iyabo Ojo, Lateef Adedimeji, and other celebrities.

== Awards and nominations ==
Year	Award	Category	Recipient	Result	Ref
2023	Africa Magic Viewers' Choice Awards	Best Picture Editor	Steve Sodiya	Nominated	
2023	Africa Magic Viewers' Choice Awards	Best Sound Editor	Kazeem Agboola	Nominated	
2023	Africa Magic Viewers' Choice Awards	Best Cinematographer	Idowu Adedapo	Nominated	
