= King of Thieves (2022 film) =

- Promotional poster
- Agẹṣinkólé
- Directed by: Adebayo Tijani; Tope Adebayo
- Produced by: Femi Adebayo
- Starring: Femi Adebayo; Toyin Abraham; Broda Shaggi; Odunlade Adekola; Ibrahim Chatta
- Production companies: Euphoria360 Media; Anthill Studios
- Distributed by: FilmOne Entertainment
- Release date: 8 April 2022
- Running time: 110 minutes
- Country: Nigeria
- Language: Yoruba
- Box office: ₦320,805,150

King of Thieves (Agẹṣinkólé) is a 2022 Nigerian epic thriller film directed by Adebayo Tijani and Tope Adebayo, and produced by Femi Adebayo.

The film stars Odunlade Adekola, Femi Adebayo, Toyin Abraham, Broda Shaggi, Adebowale Adedayo, Lateef Adedimeji, Ibrahim Yekini, and Ibrahim Chatta.

== Synopsis ==
The prosperous Yoruba kingdom of Ajeromi is thrown into turmoil with the emergence of Agesinkole, a notorious bandit who terrorises the land. As his reign of violence intensifies, the people of Ajeromi mobilise warriors, hunters, and spiritual forces in a bid to confront the threat and restore peace to their kingdom.

== Cast ==
- Femi Adebayo as Agesinkole
- Odunlade Adekola as the King of Ajeromi
- Toyin Abraham as the Queen of Ajeromi
- Ibrahim Chatta as Oguntade
- Lateef Adedimeji as Abegunde
- Aisha Lawal as Ariyibi
- Ibrahim Yekini as Abinbesu
- Broda Shaggi
- Segun Arinze as narrator
- Mr Macaroni
- Dele Odule as Otun
- Adebayo Salami as Alaremu

== Background, production and release ==
Producer and lead actor Femi Adebayo stated that the idea for King of Thieves had been in development for several years, driven by his desire to create a large-scale Yoruba-language film that would showcase indigenous culture, mythology, and storytelling using high production values. He explained that the project involved extensive research into Yoruba history and Ifa traditions in order to present culturally grounded themes within an epic narrative.

According to Adebayo, pre-production and planning spanned over a year, partly due to the challenges of assembling a large ensemble cast and identifying locations suitable for depicting the fictional kingdom of Ajeromi. He also noted that additional logistical and security measures were required during filming, given the scale of the production and the number of people involved. Adebayo disclosed that the film's production budget exceeded ₦100 million, making it one of the most expensive Yoruba-language films at the time of its release. The film was produced by Euphoria360 Media in association with Niyi Akinmolayan's Anthill Studios, while distribution was handled by FilmOne Entertainment across cinemas in Nigeria.

The film premiered on 4 April 2022 and was released theatrically across Nigeria on 8 April 2022.

== Premiere ==
The film premiered on 4 April 2022 at the IMAX Cinema, Lekki, Lagos. Themed around epic Yoruba history, the event was attended by several Nollywood practitioners and industry stakeholders, including Tade Ogidan, Tunde Kelani, Iyabo Ojo, Mercy Aigbe, and Muyiwa Ademola.

== Reception ==
King of Thieves received generally positive reviews from critics, with praise directed at its production design, cultural themes, and performances. Writing for Premium Times, Stephen Onu described the film as a significant step forward for Yoruba-language cinema, highlighting its scale, costume design, and technical ambition.

The Guardian noted the film's engagement with Yoruba history and folklore, describing it as a visually engaging epic that appealed to both traditional and contemporary audiences. According to ThisDay, King of Thieves played a notable role in shaping Nollywood's approach to epic storytelling, with its combination of mythic narrative and high production values encouraging other filmmakers to explore similar legendary and pre‑colonial themes.

Commercially, the film performed strongly at the Nigerian box office. Data released by the Cinema Exhibitors Association of Nigeria (CEAN) showed that it grossed over ₦320 million during its theatrical run, ranking it among the highest-grossing Nigerian films of 2022.

=== Awards and nominations ===
Year	Award	Category	Recipient	Result	Ref
2023	Africa Magic Viewers' Choice Awards	Best Actor In A Drama, Movie or TV Series	Femi Adebayo	Nominated	
2023	Africa Magic Viewers' Choice Awards	Best Art Director	Wale Adeleke	Won	
2023	Africa Magic Viewers' Choice Awards	Best Picture Editor	Sanjo Adegoke	Nominated	
2023	Africa Magic Viewers' Choice Awards	Best Sound Track	Adam Songbird and Tolu Obanro	Nominated	
2023	Africa Magic Viewers' Choice Awards	Best Make Up	Francisca Otaigbe	Nominated	
2023	Africa Magic Viewers' Choice Awards	Best Writer	Yinka Laoye	Nominated	
2023	Africa Magic Viewers' Choice Awards	Best Overall Movie	Femi Adebayo	Nominated	
2023	Africa Magic Viewers' Choice Awards	Best Director	Adebayo Tijani and Tope Adebayo	Nominated	
