= Crossroads (2024 film) =

- Directed by: Adebayo Tijani; Tope Adebayo
- Written by: Matthew Mao Adeboye; Bogunmbe Abiola Paul; Adebayo Tijani
- Produced by: Aisha Lawal
- Starring: Aisha Lawal; Deyemi Okanlawon; Lateef Adedimeji
- Cinematography: Adeoluwa Owu
- Music by: Tolu Obanro
- Production company: Anthill Studios
- Release date: 17 May 2024
- Running time: 117 minutes
- Country: Nigeria
- Language: English

Crossroads is a 2024 Nigerian drama film directed by Adebayo Tijani and Tope Adebayo. Set in the 1990s, it portrays the complexities of university life through the intertwined experiences of Eriola (Aisha Lawal), Oyekan (Deyemi Okanlawon), and Fela (Lateef Adedimeji).

== Background ==
The narrative follows Eriola as she struggles with familial expectations while navigating the challenges Oyekan's gang activities pose. False accusations further complicate her journey, but with the support of her friends, Eriola confronts these obstacles. The story intensifies as Don Smart, a looming threat, targets Eriola, prompting Fela to step in and protect her, culminating in emotional and dramatic confrontations. The film premiered on Amazon Prime Video on 17 May 2024.

== Synopsis ==
Set in 1990s Nigeria, Crossroads follows the lives of three university students, Eriola, Oyekan, and Fela, as they navigate personal and social challenges. Eriola is caught between family expectations and the turmoil caused by Oyekan's gang. When false accusations threaten her future, she relies on her friends for support. As tensions escalate, Don Smart emerges as a menacing figure, targeting Eriola and forcing Fela to step in as her protector.

== Cast ==
- Aishat Lawal as Eriola
- Femi Adebayo as Egunkemi
- Lateef Adedimeji as Fela
- Deyemi Okanlawon as Oyekan
- Wunmi Toriola as Dunni
- Adebayo Salami as Dunni's father
