= Olumide Oworu =

Nigeria actor and musician

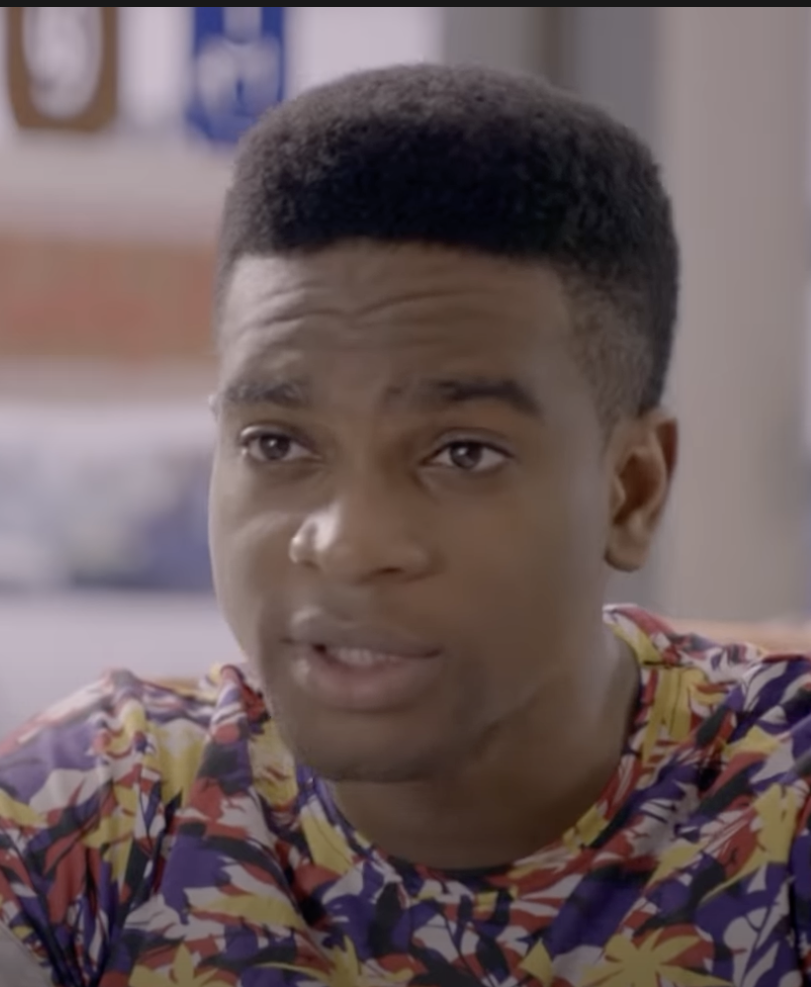
- Oworu in 2018
- Born: December 11, 1994 (age 31)
- Education: King's College, Lagos; Babcock University
- Occupations: Actor, model, rapper, politician
- Years active: 2000–present
- Television: The Johnsons; Everyday People; The Patriot, The Men In Her Life, Hammer, Far from Home(Netflix); Stolen Waters, and; New Son.
- Awards: 2014 Nollywood Revelation of The Year award; 2015 Best of Nollywood Awards for most promising actor

Olumide Oworu (born December 11, 1994) is a Nigerian actor, model and rapper.

== Career ==
Oworu attended King's College, Lagos, and the University of Lagos. He graduated from Babcock University in June 2017. Oworu commenced his acting career at the age of six with the television series Everyday People. He is also known for his role of Tari in the Africa Magic Series The Johnsons. He also starred in other television series such as The Patriot, The Men In Her Life, Hammer, Stolen Waters, and New Son. Olumide portrayed the character ‘Weki’ in MTV Base's Shuga series, seasons 3 and 4. He is also a television presenter. Olumide has won several awards including the "Mr. Popularity" prize in the Model of Africa 2012 contest, the Nollywood Revelation of The Year award at the Scream Awards 2014, and The Most Promising Youth Actor award at Ping Awards 2014. He won the Most Promising actor in the 2015 Best of Nollywood Awards and Best Supporting actor for his role in the Soldier's Story in the 2016 Africa Magic Viewers' Choice Awards (AMVCA).

== Selected filmography ==
- Everyday People
- A Soldier's Story (2015) as Edwin
- Shuga (2013) Weki
- This Is It (TV series) (2016)
- The Johnsons (2021-2022) as Tari Johnson
- Man of God (2022) as Daniel Obalolu
- Far From Home (2022) as Atlas
- Day Of Destiny (2021) as Chidi
- The New Normal (2020)
- She Is (2019) as Joshua
- Kyaddala (2019) as Eze
- Ijakumo (2022) as Young Jide
- Rumour Has It (Season 3)
- The Reckoner (2021)
- Choices (2019) as Tega
- Detour (2021) as Alex
- About a Boy (2021) as Eazy
- Àkúdàáyà (2023)
- The Black Book (2023) as Damilola Edima
- A Tribe Called Judah (2023) as Ejiro Judah
- The Hard Conversations (2024) as Femi
- Saving Onome (2024) as Jite
- On the Edge (2024) as Tomisin
- Lisabi: The Uprising (2024) as Bejide
- Lisabi: A Legend Is Born (2025)
