= 2021 End SARS memorial protest =

2021 Nigerian protest

End SARS memorial protest
- Part of End SARS
- Date: 20 October 2021
- Location: Nigeria
- Caused by: 2020 Lekki shooting and lack of freedom of expression
- Methods: Protest, demonstrations, online activism, civil disobedience, marches
- Status: Ongoing

Parties
Protesters: (no centralised leadership)	Government of Nigeria; Nigerian Armed Forces; Nigerian Army; Nigerian Police; Pro-government citizens

Casualties
- Arrested: 2

The 2021 EndSARS memorial protest was a protest carried out by Nigerians and End SARS activist to mark the one year anniversary of the Lekki toll gate shooting which took place on 20 October, 2020.

== Background ==
After the aftermath of End SARS protest, End SARS activists announced that there would be a memorial to mark the Lekki Shootings. On 19 October 2021, Mr Macaroni and Falz announced that the protest will be carried out by cars in accordance to the message by the police force, which prohibited any form of protest.

== Protest ==
=== Lagos State ===
On 19 October, it was reported that troops of security operatives were all positioned at the toll gate to ensure that no protest would be held on 20 October.

On 20 October, protesters gathered mainly at the Lekki Toll Gate at as early as 6 am inside their cars, trucks and buses. Some waved the Nigerian flag while shouting "End SARS" and "End Bad Government". It was also reported that some protesters who moved on feet were arrested.

At about 2 pm, tear gas was shot at protesters which caused some of them to leave the scene leaving their cars and other items behind.

Falz and Mr Macaroni joined the protesters, who continued their protest. An Uber driver was reported to be brutalized by the police and 2 journalists were allegedly arrested.

=== Abuja ===
Protesters gathered at the Unity Fountains, Maitama to hold a peaceful protest. Protesters moved on foot shouting "End SARS" until they were dispersed by police men.

It was also reported that protesters against End SARS were seen carrying place cards with inscriptions that the Lekki toll gate shooting was a hoax.

At about 4 pm, protesters returned to carry out the protest.

=== Portharcourt ===
In Porthacourt, protesters took to the streets at about 5 pm organizing a candle light procession.

== See also ==
- Occupy Nigeria
- 2018–2019 Nigerian protests
