= The Legend of the Vagabond Queen of Lagos =

2024 film by The Agbajowo Collective

- Festival poster
- Directed by: The Agbajowo Collective
- Written by: The Agbajowo Collective
- Produced by: Mathew Cerf; James Tayler; Megan Chapman; Andrew Maki; Mohammed Zanna; Michael Henrichs; Mustapha Emmanuel; Bisola Akinmuyiwa; Chioma Onyenwe
- Starring: Temiloluwa Ami-Williams; Debo Adedayo; Kachi Okechukwu; Gerard Avlessi; Teniola Aladese
- Cinematography: Leo Purman
- Edited by: Khalid Shamis; Mathew Cerf; Yiqing Yu
- Music by: Michael "Truth" Ogunlade
- Production companies: Slum Dwellers International; Justice & Empowerment Initiatives; Nigeria Slum/Informal Settlement Federation; Die Gesellschaft DGS; Raconteur Productions
- Release date: 7 September 2024 (TIFF)
- Running time: 101 minutes
- Countries: Nigeria; Germany; South Africa; United States
- Languages: Nigerian Pidgin; Egun; English; Yoruba

The Legend of the Vagabond Queen of Lagos is a 2024 social thriller film directed by The Agbajowo Collective, which comprises Samuel Okechukwu, Temitope Ogungbamila, Bisola Akinmuyiwa, Elijah Atinkpo, Tina Edukpo, James Tayler, and Mathew Cerf. It premiered at the 49th Toronto International Film Festival on 7 September 2024.

== Cast ==
- Temiloluwa Ami-Williams as Jawu
- Debo Adedayo as Abisoro
- Kachi Okechukwu as Daniel
- Gerard Avlessi as Mitongi
- Teniola Aladese as Happiness

== Production ==
The film is based on the 2017 destruction of Otodo-Gbame, a waterfront settlement in Lagos. To create a realistic sense of community onscreen, The Agbajowo Collective sought out existing Nigerian communities to appear in the film.

== Release ==
Rushlake Media acquired the international sales rights to the film on 6 August 2024. The trailer was released on 4 September 2024. A promotional clip was released on 7 September 2024, the same day as the film's premiere at the 49th Toronto International Film Festival. The film was screened as part of the festival's Centrepiece program.

== Reception ==
Jared Mobarak of The Film Stage gave the film a grade of B, calling it "an effective intersection of political drama and public-service announcement". Olivia Popp of Cineuropa called the film "a meaningful, grassroots-orientated debut film informed by the ongoing evictions of informal settlements in Africa’s largest city".

== See also ==
- Slum clearance
- Informal settlements
