= Nora Awolowo =

Nigerian photographer and film director

- Born: Oreoluwa Racheal Awolowo; 2 March 1999 (age 27); Lagos, Nigeria
- Education: Ekiti State University
- Occupations: Producer; Cinematographer; Director
- Known for: "Red Circle" Life at the Bay, Symphonies, All Lives Matter, David, Baby Blues
- Website: rixelstudios.com

Oreoluwa Racheal Awolowo (born 2 March 1999), popularly known as Nora Awolowo, is a Nigerian film producer, director, and cinematographer. In 2025 she became the youngest Nigerian filmmaker to reach the ₦100 million box office milestone for Red Circle, a film for which she served as both producer and cinematographer. She is also the first Nigerian woman nominated for Best Cinematography at the Africa Magic Viewers’ Choice Awards (AMVCA) for her work in the Nigerian 2024 epic Lisabi: The Uprising. She produced the Guiness World Record holder movie, Black Market, known for holding the record for largest number of people present at a screening of a movie at the same time.

== Early life ==
Awolowo was born, raised and schooled in Lagos State, Nigeria, where she still lives. She received her degree in Accounting from Ekiti State University in 2019. At university, she developed a passion for photography and learned to take images with her phone, earning some paid work while still a student. More interested in storytelling, she transitioned to filmmaking, beginning with documenting behind-the-scenes footage for unscripted television projects, such as Lota Chukwu’s Lota Takes. During this period, she also taught herself to edit television content, solidifying her interest in a filmmaking career.

== Career ==
By the time she graduated from university in 2019, Awolowo had been working in the film industry for two years. That year, she established her production company, Rixel Studios, and released her debut documentary, Life at the Bay, which follows the lives of women living in Tarkwa Bay. The short was screened at the Africa International Film Festival and established a pattern in her early work, which often explored the personal and societal challenges faced by Nigerians, particularly women. That same year she followed up with Symphonies, a short narrative film about a young woman whose life begins to unravels amid personal challenges. In 2021, she released David, a faith-based film about a young man on the verge of taking his life. The film went on to win two awards and screened at six international film festivals.

Awolowo's breakthrough came with Baby Blues: The Trials of Childbirth (2021), a documentary that highlighted the challenges of Nigerian women facing childbirth and post-partum depression. In 2023, Baby Blues was nominated for Best Documentary at the Africa Magic Viewers’ Choice Awards, alongside another of her films, Nigeria: The Debut—a documentary commissioned by International Federation of Association Football (FIFA), which went on to win the category.

In 2024, she served as cinematographer alongside Barnabas Emordi in the Netflix historical drama, Lisabi: The Uprising, with both receiving a nomination for Best Cinematographer at the Africa Magic Viewers’ Choice Awards (AMVCA).

In 2025, she served as both producer and cinematographer to the thriller Red Circle, her biggest commercial success to date. In less than a month following its June release, its crossed the ₦100 million mark at the box office, establishing Awolowo as the youngest Nigerian filmmaker to reach that benchmark.

== Distinctions ==
Awolowo is a three-time nominee—in 2020, 2021, and 2023— for The Future Awards Africa in the Prize for Film category.

In 2025 she received Zikoko’s HERtitude award for Film.

== Awards and nominations ==
Year	Award ceremony	Award description	Work	Result	Ref
2020	The Future Awards Africa	Prize for Film		Nominated	
2019	25 Under 25 SME Awards	Best Media and Communications Person		Won	
2023	Africa Magic Viewers' Choice Awards	Best Documentary	Nigeria: The Debut	Won	
2023	Africa Magic Viewers' Choice Awards	Best Documentary	Baby Blues	Nominated	
2023	The Future Awards Africa	Prize for Film	Herself	Pending	

== Filmography ==
Year	Title	Role
2019	Life at the Bay	Director
2019	Symphonies	Director
2021	David	Cinematographer
2021	Baby Blues	Director
2022	The Order of Things	Cinematographer
2023	Dear Men	Cinematographer
2024	What Are You Truly Afraid Of?	Director
2024	Lisabi	Cinematographer
2025	Red Circle	Producer and Cinematographer
