= Mikolo (film) =

2023 Nigerian family film directed by Niyi Akinmolayan

- Directed by: Niyi Akinmolayan
- Screenplay by: Niyi Akinmolayan
- Produced by: Victoria Akujobi
- Starring: Pamilerin Ayodeji; Fiyinfoluwa Asenuga; Yvonne Jegede; Binta Ayo Mogaji; Daniel Etim Effiong; Riyo David; Femi Adebayo; Yemi Elesho.
- Music by: Tolu Obanro
- Production company: Anthill Studios
- Distributed by: Film One Entertainment, Amazon Prime
- Release date: 18 August 2023
- Running time: 110 minutes
- Country: Nigeria
- Language: English with some Yoruba dialogue (subtitled in English)
- Budget: ₦120 million

Mikolo is a 2023 Nigerian live action and computer-animated family fantasy film. It was directed by Niyi Akinmolayan, who also wrote the screenplay. The film stars child actors Pamilerin Ayodeji and Fiyinfoluwa Asenuga, along with Yvonne Jegede and Binta Ayo Mogaji, in the lead roles. The film is a rare example of Nollywood production of film for children. With a runtime of 1 hour 50 minutes, it premiered in Nigerian cinemas on 18 August 2023, and was released on Amazon Prime in multiple markets around the world in December 2023.

== Plot ==
The film follows the adventures of a sister, Funke, and her younger brother, Habeeb, who are brought from Lagos by their mother to stay with their paternal grandmother in Gbagi village, Ondo State, while she takes a long training course. Before departure, a story-telling neighbour, Babablu, tells of the Irumole ("magical creatures") forest, which lies near Gbagi and shares an amulet with Funke. The children's' father, who works in the UK, is away after an argument with their mother, and this leads to tensions in the family as they travel.

Exploring locally in Ondo, with a local, Jay-Jay, the children come to a high place where they unknowingly encounter a mystical flying creature, which follows them to their grandmother's home. It is later pursued by a spirit guardian in human form, the Abula. After Funke meets the creature, she names it Mikolo after a dog in a book she is reading. The children befriend Mikolo, hiding it from their grandmother. Following various adventures, including the children taking Jay-Jay's electric tricycle-car into busy night traffic and Mikolo being seized by both the Abula and then some local bandits, the children aid the creature in returning to its home place, a magical realm accessed by a bridge from the high place in which they met. They themselves get into difficulty during this process, and a search for them begins. In the course of the adventures with Mikolo, the children's father appears and he and their mother work, with help from Babablu, who is more than he seems, to find them. All having reached the hidden magical forest, parents and children meet Mikolo's grateful parents, and having bid Mikolo farewell, return a happier family. The film finishes with the statement "Mikolo will return".

== Cast ==
- Pamilerin Ayodeji as Funke
- Fiyinfoluwa Asenuga as Habeeb/Habib
- Yvonne Jegede as Lola (mother)
- Binta Ayo Mogaji as Grandma (credited as Ayo Mogaji)
- Riyo David as the Abula (forest guardian)
- Yemi Elesho as Jay-Jay
- Daniel Etim Effiong as Maleek (father)
- Femi Adebayo as Babablu
- Oluwatosin Sarah as Clara
- Adelosoye Maxwell Ademola as Head Hunter
- Dhortune as Security Man
- Adamson Ibrahim as Security Man
- Sola Martins as Man in the Bus

Mikolo was voiced by Adam Songbird, and the parent creatures by Dhortune Thatondoboy and Dolafo Adigun. Supporting roles were played by more than 70 other actors.

== Production ==
The film was conceived and directed by Niyi Akinmolayan, who also wrote the screenplay. It had a large budget in Nollywood terms, 120 million naira, and was filmed in Ondo State, with post-production at Anthill Studios in Lagos. Some scanning of actors was used to merge the live action and CGI aspects. The film was exceptional in that Nigeria's extremely active film industry produces few films for children - none from over 4,700 Nollywood films produced in a four-year period ending September 2021, or from then to the release of Mikolo. This led to one critic declaring it to be the most important Nigerian film of 2023, and expressing the hope that the local film industry could also use such a film as the basis for valuable TV, gaming, education and merchandising opportunities, hitherto missed. Mikolo did follow the first Nigerian feature-length animated film, Lady Buckit & The Motley Mopsters, from Abuja in 2020.
