= Ayinla (film) =

2021 Nigerian movie by Tunde Kelani

- Directed by: Tunde Kelani
- Produced by: Jadesola Osiberu
- Starring: Lateef Adedimeji; Omowumi Dada; Bimbo Manuel; Ade Laoye; Kunle Afolayan; Bimbo Ademoye; Mr Macaroni
- Distributed by: FilmOne
- Release dates: 13 June 2021 (Lagos premiere); 18 June 2021
- Running time: 110 minutes
- Country: Nigeria
- Language: Yoruba
- Budget: ₦50 Million
- Box office: ₦91,470,900

Ayinla is a 2021 musical eponymous film based on the life of Ayinla Yusuf, popularly known as Ayinla Omowura, an Apala musician who was stabbed to death by his manager named Bayewu in a bar fight on 6 May 1980 at Abeokuta. The film premiered on 13 June 2021 in Lagos and was released to theatres on 18 June 2021. Directed by Tunde Kelani, the film was set in the 1970s and early 1980s and shot in Abeokuta, Ogun State. Lateef Adedimeji assumed the role of Ayinla, starring alongside Omowumi Dada, Bimbo Manuel, Ade Laoye, Kunle Afolayan, Bimbo Ademoye and Mr Macaroni. Ayinla is Kelani's first major film since his 2015 release of Dazzling Mirage. The budget for this feature film is officially given as ₦50 Million.

== Synopsis ==
Ayinla is a quick-tempered and promiscuous Apala musician at the peak of his career. Ajala, a show promoter, offers to take Ayinla and his Apala group on tour in London, as their music has been in high demand in the city. While arrangements for the London trip are underway, Ayinla takes his manager, Bayewu's girlfriend, which leads to enmity between them. Ayinla decides to confront Bayewu in a bar, leading to an unintended brawl and Ayinla's untimely death.

== Cast ==
- Lateef Adedimeji as Ayinla
- Omowumi Dada as Deborah
- Bimbo Manuel as Uncle Sam
- Ade Laoye as Jaye
- Kunle Afolayan as Ajala
- Bimbo Ademoye as Fali
- Mr Macaroni as Bayowa
- Kemi Adewale as secretary
- Adekunle Adeosun as Abesujobi
- Dare Agbejo as Ewe
- Kayode Akindina as Willy
- Olalekan Akinyelu as Kushoro
- Abidemi Apoku as Badira
- Gbenga Goke Fadiran as DPO
- Tunde Kelani as cameo
- Edunjobi Abdulganiu as Ayinla's driver
- Abdul Wasiu Olaiya as Ajasa
- Owolabi Johnson as Ajasa's brother

== Production and release ==
Ayinla was shot on location in Abeokuta. It was produced by Jadesola Osiberu and the production was sponsored by First Bank of Nigeria. The film premiered on 13 June 2021 in Lagos.

== Reception ==
A reviewer scored the film 7 out of 10 saying "Conclusively, Ayinla proves to be worth the hype. That it succeeds is largely due to Adedimeji Lateef and director Tunde Kelani. No film is perfect, but this one takes its place among the Nollywood greats in recent times. Commenting on the movie in a Nigerian Tribune review, Adekunle Sulaimon said "some scenes where Ayinla songs are being sung, Adedimeji’s voice was not at par with the music played, and the feud between Bayewu and Ayinla was not adequately represented, a scene of their squabble is not enough to tell of the duo's arch-rivalry despite how heated their enmity was spoken of in Abeokuta." He rated the movie 8 out of 10. Also, a review published on The Lagos Review reiterated why the film was not exactly a biopic. "What the film lacks in biographical fidelity, it makes up for in performances, costuming, locations, props, etc. There is no controversy at all in describing Ayinla as a musical. Right from the first scene, the audience is immersed in the melodious baritone and drums that are characteristic of Omowura’s Apala music. This tempo is maintained through a significant part of the film. The implication of this is that there are no dull moments for the audience, at least until the melancholy of tragedy sets in." Vivian Nwajiaku of Afrocritik rated the film 6.4/10 and said, "Ayinla is undoubtedly an impressive film. What it lacks in plot, it makes up for with great acting. Indeed, in spite of its flaws, it places Nollywood on the right path and sets a precedent for future biopics".

=== Awards and nominations ===
Year	Award	Category	Recipient	Result	Ref
2021	Africa Movie Academy Awards	Best Actor in a Leading Role	Lateef Adedimeji	Nominated	
2021	Africa Movie Academy Awards	Achievement in Cinematography	Ayinla	Won	
2021	Africa Movie Academy Awards	Best Film in An African Language	Ayinla	Nominated	
2021	Africa Movie Academy Awards	Best Nigerian Film	Ayinla	Nominated	
