= Bose Akinola =

Nigerian actress and producer

- Other name: Akin Boss
- Citizenship: Nigeria
- Occupation: Actress
- Title: Mrs.
- Spouse: Mr Buliaminu Akinola
- Children: 4
- Awards: Two times nominee for AMAA Award Nominee for American DIYMA Award, 2021 Received Starboard Entertainment Award, Canada, 2018, Best Indigenous Movie based on AMOPE AJABIIJI, 2021, Nominee for AHBEA Award in the United States of America, 2016, ZAFAA Award for Best Indigenous Movie, 2022

Bose Akinola (born September, 9) is a Nigerian actress and producer. She is a Nollywood actress and a Yoruba woman. Her movies are in Yoruba. She is also called Akin Boss.

== Early life and education ==
Bose went to Omoyeni Primary School Ibadan and Community Grammar School, Akanran. She later moved to Adekile Goodwill Grammar School, Orita-Aperin, Ibadan, where she wrote her WAEC in 1989.

== Acting career ==
Bose joined the film industry in 1998 and focused on Yoruba movies. She featured in “Idunnu Okan” and “Loogun Ofe.”

In 2022, she indicated interest and went ahead to vie for the governorship of the Theatre Arts and Motion Pictures Producers Association of Nigeria (TAMPAN) Oyo State Chapter. She won the election and became the new governor of the Oyo State Theatre Arts and Motion Pictures Practitioners Association of Nigeria (TAMPAN) with 113 votes. She took over from Rose Odika, who was in that seat for eight years.

== Personal life ==
She is married to Mr. Buliaminu Akinola. They have two children and two grandchildren. Bose is a grandmother who shares the same birthday with her granddaughter. On September 9, 2025, when the baby was delivered, Bose stated, “God gave me the sweetest birthday gift. Two hearts, one birthday. My heart just got a whole lot bigger. Blessed to welcome my beautiful grandbaby into the world After months of waiting, praying, and dreaming, our little miracle is finally here. Words can't describe the love we feel holding this tiny blessing in our arms. Welcome to the world, our sweetest gift.”

== Awards ==
She has the following awards:

- Two times nominee for AMAA Award.
- Nominee for American DIYMA Award, 2021.
- Received Starboard Entertainment Award, Canada, 2018.
- Best Indigenous Movie based on AMOPE AJABIIJI, 2021.
- Nominee for AHBEA Award in the United States of America, 2016.
- ZAFAA Award for Best Indigenous Movie, 2022.
