= Seven Doors =

1988 play by Botho Strauss

- Written by: Botho Strauß
- Original language: German

Premiere
- Date premiered: 20 November 1988
- Place premiered: Stockholm City Theatre

Seven Doors (German: Sieben Türen) is a 1988 play by the German writer Botho Strauß. It consists of eleven darkly comedic sketches on the subject of social decline. The play premiered on 20 November 1988 at the Stockholm City Theatre.

== Reception ==
Michael Billington of The Guardian wrote in 2004, when the play was produced for the Minerva Theatre in Chichester: "What makes one warm to Strauss is his ability to satirise his own bleak view of individual desperation and social decline. ... What unites these sketches is the idea that collectively we live on the brink of destruction while individually our lives are increasingly robbed of dignity. ... Even if you don't buy into Strauss's absurdist philosophy, there is a contrapuntal gaiety to his pessimism."
