= Survival of Jelili =

2019 Nigerian comedy film by Desmond Elliot

- Directed by: Desmond Elliot
- Produced by: Femi Adebayo
- Starring: Toyin Abraham; Dele Odule; Femi Adebayo; Rachael Okonkwo; Sunday Omobolanle, Woli Agba, Aisha Lawal, Adebayo Salami; Bolanle Ninalowo
- Release date: 6 December 2019
- Country: Nigeria
- Language: Yoruba

Survival of Jelili previously titled as Jelili Reloaded is a 2019 Nigerian comedy film produced by Femi Adebayo and directed by Desmond Elliot. The film is a sequel to the 2011 comic film Jelili. The film stars Femi Adebayo in the title role as Jelili, while also stars Toyin Abraham and Dele Odule in the lead roles. The film had its theatrical release on 6 December 2019 and received positive reviews from critics. It was also streamed via Netflix on 8 July 2020.

== Synopsis ==
The film is based on Jelili, a young man who aspires to seek social status and changes his jobs ranging from boxing to modelling.

== Cast ==
- Femi Adebayo as Jelili
- Toyin Abraham
- Dele Odule
- Desmond Elliot
- Rachael Okonkwo as Rechael Okonkwo
- Sunday Omobolanle as Papi Luwe
- Bolanle Ninalowo
- Aisha Lawal
- Woli Agba
- Adebayo Salami

== Production ==
In 2012, following the box office success of Jelili producer and actor Femi Adebayo announced that a sequel film would be made titling as Jelili Reloaded. However, the shooting of the sequel film had not commenced and materialized during that time frame. After seven years being in development hell, the principal photography of the film began in late 2018.

The first schedule of the film began at Ibadan and the final schedule of the film was wrapped up in Ilorin. The film was predominantly shot in various locations across Southwest Nigeria. It was revealed that the filming took place for about 21 days. The director of the film Desmond Elliot also played a pivotal role in the film while Rachael Okonkwo made her Yoruba-language film debut through this film.
