= Femi Adebayo =

Nigerian actor and director (born 1976)

- Fẹ́mi Adébáyọ̀
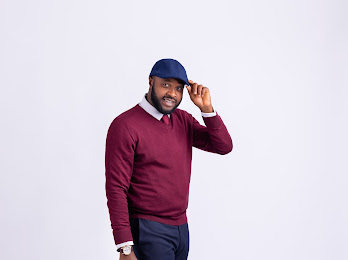
- Portrait of Femi Adebayo
- Born: 31 December 1976 (age 49); Ilorin, Kwara State
- Other names: Jelili, Sonto Alapata, Ogundiji
- Citizenship: Nigeria
- Education: University of Ibadan; University of Ilorin
- Occupations: Actor; Director; Producer; Politician; Lawyer
- Years active: 1985–present
- Spouse: Omotayo Adebayo
- Children: 4
- Father: Adebayo Salami
- Relatives: Tope Adebayo; Sodiq Adebayo

Femi Adebayo (born 31 December 1976) is a Nigerian actor, filmmaker, director, and lawyer. He is known for his work in Yoruba-language cinema and for directing commercially successful films such as King of Thieves (2022), Jagun Jagun (2023), and Seven Doors (2024).

In 2024, he won the Africa Movie Academy Awards for Best Actor in a Supporting Role for Jagun Jagun, also won the Africa Magic Viewers' Choice Awards' Best Lead Actor for his performance in Seven Doors in 2025.

He has appeared in more than 500 films and has been active in the Nigerian film industry since the 1990s.

== Early life and education ==
Femi Adebayo was born on 31 December 1976 in Ilorin, Kwara State to Adebayo Salami and Alhaja Risikat Ejide. He attended C&S College before transferring to Oke Ode Grammar School, where he served as Head Boy and completed his secondary education in 1994. He earned a Bachelor of Laws degree (LL.B) from the University of Ilorin in 2002 and attended the Nigerian Law School, where he was called to the Nigerian Bar in 2003. He later completed a Master of Laws (LL.M) degree at the University of Ibadan in 2008.

== Career ==
Adebayo made his acting debut in the Yoruba-language film Owo Blow in the 1990s, which brought him early recognition. He subsequently became a prominent figure in Yoruba cinema, appearing in over 500 films, including Ile Alayo, Jelili, and Survival of Jelili.

Beyond acting, Adebayo expanded into film production and directing. In 2008, he founded J15 Media Network and the J15 School of Performing Arts, which has trained hundreds of aspiring actors and filmmakers for the Nigerian film industry.

In 2021, he established Euphoria360 Media, a production company responsible for several large-scale Yoruba-language productions, including King of Thieves (Agesinkole), Jagun Jagun, and Seven Doors.

King of Thieves (Agesinkole), released in 2022, was produced by Adebayo through Euphoria360 Media in collaboration with Anthill Studios. The film became one of the highest-grossing Yoruba-language films in Nigerian cinema history, earning over ₦320 million at the box office.

In 2023, Adebayo produced the Netflix Original epic Jagun Jagun, directed by Tope Adebayo and Adebayo Tijani. The film ranked among Netflix’s top ten non-English films globally and received multiple nominations across major Nigerian award platforms, including the Africa Magic Viewers' Choice Awards, Africa Movie Academy Awards, and Best of Nollywood Awards.

His 2024 Netflix mini-series Seven Doors debuted at number one on Netflix Nigeria and remained in that position for several weeks. Adebayo’s performance earned him the Africa Magic Viewers' Choice Awards for Best Lead Actor.

Adebayo’s films are frequently noted for their emphasis on Yoruba culture, language, costume, and mythology, combining traditional themes with contemporary cinematic techniques.

From 2016 to 2019, Adebayo served as Special Adviser on Arts, Culture, and Tourism to the Governor of Kwara State. In this role, he worked on initiatives aimed at strengthening cultural tourism and promoting the creative economy in the state.

Adebayo has signed endorsement deals with several brands, including Samsung, Trophy, Trumpy, VG Pensions, Kpearl, and Modara. He has also participated in advertising campaigns for Coca-Cola and Peak, and previously served as a brand ambassador for StarTimes.

== Personal life ==
Adebayo married Omotayo Adebayo on 9 October 2016. Adebayo and his wife have one son. He also has three children from an earlier marriage.

== Awards and honours ==
Year	Award	Category	Work	Result	Ref
2009	Africa Movie Academy Awards	Best Actor in a Supporting Role	Apaadi	Nominated	
2015	City People Entertainment Awards	Best Movie Producer Of The Year (Yoruba)		Won	
2017	City People Entertainment Awards	Best Actor Of The Year (Yoruba)		Won	
2017	Best of Nollywood Awards	Best Actor in a Lead role –Yoruba	Afaila Ojo	Won	
2018	Africa Magic Viewers Choice Awards	Best Indigenous Movie (Yoruba)	Etiko Onigedu	Won	
2018	Best of Nollywood Awards	Best Actor in a Lead role –Yoruba	Etiko Onigedu	Won	
2019	Best of Nollywood Awards	Best Kiss in a Movie	Diamond in the Sky	Nominated	
2019	Best of Nollywood Awards	Best Actor in a Supporting Role (Yoruba)	The Return of Kesari	Nominated	
2020	Best of Nollywood Awards	Best Actor in a Supporting Role (Yoruba)	Lucifer	Won	
2022	Africa Magic Viewers' Choice Awards	Best Actor in A Comedy	Progressive Tailors Club	Nominated	
2023	Africa Magic Viewers' Choice Awards	Best Actor In A Drama, Movie Or TV Series	King of Thieves	Nominated	
2023	Africa Magic Viewers' Choice Awards	Best Overall Movie	King of Thieves	Nominated	
2023	Africa International Film Festival	Globe Award Honoree	Jagun Jagun	Won	
2024	2024 Africa Magic Viewers' Choice Awards	Best Indigenous Language Movie- West Africa	Jagun Jagun	Won	
2024	Africa Movie Academy Awards	Best Actor in a Supporting Role	Jagun Jagun	Won	
2024	Abuja International Film Festival	Outstanding Male Actor	Jagun Jagun	Won	
2025	Africa Magic Viewers' Choice Awards	Best Lead Actor	Seven Doors	Won	

== Filmography ==
Year	Film	Role
2025	Labake Olododo	
2024	Lisabi: The Uprising	Olu Olodan
2024	Seven Doors	king Adedunjoye
2024	Beast of Two Worlds	Ade Apa Igala
2024	Queen Lateefah	
2024	Lakatabu	Muyiwa
2024	Crossroads	Egunkemi
2024	House of Ga'a	Olukuoye
2023	Ijogbon	Head of Amoteku
2023	Mikolo	Babablu
2023	Jagun Jagun	Ogundiji
2023	World Famous	Pastor
2023	Diety	Komokomo
2022	Maleeka	Kunle
2022	King of Thieves	Adeshikoye/Adeoye
2021	cordelia	Rasaki
2021	Ile Alayo	
2021	Ete	Deji
2021	Love Castle	Chief Balogun
2021	Progressive Tailors Club	Agbabiaka
2021	The Cokers	Doctor
2021	Charge and Bail	Whole Adetutu
2021	Charlie Charlie	
2020	The Miracle Centre	
2020	Special Jollof	
2020	Unroyal	Royal Suitor
2020	Mama Drama	Dotun
2019	Jumbled	Yinka
2019	Survival of Jelili	Jelili
2019	Diamonds in the Sky	Kayode
2019	Mokalik	Mr. Ogidan
2018	The Island	kola
2018	The Ghost and the Tout	Dayo
2018	Heaven on My Mind	Soji
2017	Sola Arikusa	
2014	October 1	Banji
2013	Ayitale	Aderopo
2011	Jelili	Jelili
2009	Apaadi	
1996	Owo Blow	Wole Owolabi
