= Jide Awobona =

Nigerian actor and filmmaker (born 1985)

- Born: Babajide Saheed Awobona; 9 February 1985 (age 41); Lagos state
- Education: Olabisi Onabanjo University
- Occupations: Actor; Film-maker
- Years active: 2002–present

Babajide Saheed "Jide" Awobona (born 9 February 1985) is a Nigerian actor, scriptwriter and filmmaker. He was born and raised in Lagos but hails from Ogun State. He gained popularity for his role as Sam in the sitcom Jenifa's Diary.

== Early life ==
Jide Awobona was born on 9 February 1985 in Lagos State, Nigeria. He is, however, a native of Ogun State, Nigeria.

== Education ==
Jide Awobona had his primary education at Wesley Memorial Primary School in Lagos. He had his secondary education at Amuwo Odofin Secondary School, after which he got his Bachelor of Arts degree in Mass Communications from Olabisi Onabanjo University in Ogun State.

== Career ==
Jide Awobona started his acting career in 2002, the same year he started his acting training with Jovies Perfection Press. His career kicked off in 2003 when he played a major role in the popular Nigerian TV drama series Super Story, Last Honor. Since then, has starred and produced several Nigeria films. He was nominated for best Actor in Leading role (Yoruba) by BON awards in 2020.

== Selected filmography ==
- Jenifa's Diary (2013) as Sam
- The Bunglers (2017) as Alhaji
- Ranti Mi (2018) as Jide
- Convicted (2019)
- Olopa Olorun (2019)
- Alimi (2021) as Samuel
- Akaba (2021)
- The Cokers (2021) as Bayo
- Clock (2019)
- Olokun (2021)
- The Event (2017)
- Olawura (2022) alongside Tierny Olalere
- Lisabi: The Uprising (2024) as Osobande

== Awards and nominations ==
Year	Event	Prize	Film	Result	Ref
2017	Maya Awards Africa	Best actor in TV series (Jenifa's Diary)	—N/a	Won	
2020	BON Awards	Best actor in a leading role (Yoruba)	You Are Me	Nominated	

== See also ==
- List of Yoruba people
- List of Nigerian actors
