= Adebimpe Oyebade =

Nigerian actress (born 1992)

- Other name: Mo Bimpe
- Citizenship: Nigeria
- Education: Ekiti State University
- Occupation: Film actress
- Spouse: Lateef Adedimeji (m. 2021)

Adebimpe Oyebade better known as Mo Bimpe, is a Nigerian film actress known for winning the 2018 City People Entertainment Awards for Best New Actress of the Year.

== Career ==
Oyebade started her career as a model in 2016, as well as auditioning for roles in the Nigerian film industry in the same year. She became famous after she was featured in Onikede, a film directed by Abbey Lanre. She has appeared in about 50 Nollywood films since then. Oyebade also runs a fashion store and a skincare company.

== Filmography ==
- Omo Oba (2019) as Adebimpe
- Mask (2019) as Sholape
- Body Bag (2020) as Kemi
- Ero Mi (2020) as Darasimi
- The New Patriots (2020) as Atilola Olubo
- The Cokers (2021) as Aderonke
- Apala (2021) as Aremun's wife
- Mr and Mrs Bernard (2021) as Dammy
- Couple Goals (2021) as Chloe
- President Kuti (2021) as Ifemide
- That One Time (2022) as Sophia
- Madami (2022) as Dupe
- Romeo (2022) as Dabira
- Ojukoro (2022) as Olawunmi
- Elebute (2022) as Princess Aderonke
- Imade (2023) as Imade
- The Secret Behind Our Marriage (2023) as Bisi
- Igbale (2023) as Folawe
- She Must Be Obeyed (2023) as Adeola
- Lisabi: The Uprising (2024) as Ikeola.

== Personal life ==
Oyebade married Lateef Adedimeji in December 2021.
