= Adebayo Tijani =

Nigerian film director and actor

- Born: 24 March 1975 (age 51); Oyo
- Citizenship: Nigeria
- Occupations: Film producer, Film director, Actor, Film actor

Adebayo Tijani is a Nigerian film producer, director and actor.

== Career ==
Tijani was ranked second highest-earning Nollywood directors by FilmOne in 2022.

== Filmography ==
Year	Film	Role
2019	77 Bullets	Director
2020	The New Patriots	Co director with Terry Ayebo
2022	Ijakumo	Director
2022	King of Thieves	Co director with Femi Adebayo, Tope Adebayo Salami
2023	Jagun Jagun	Director
2023	Ada Omo Daddy	Co director with Akay Mason
2024	Beast of Two Worlds	Co director with Odunlade Adekola
2024	Farmer's Bride	Co director with Jack’enneth Opukeme
2024	Seven Doors	Director with Femi Adebayo, Tope Adebayo Salami
2024	Alakada: Bad and Boujee	Director

== Awards ==
Year	Award	Film	Category	Result
2014	Africa Movie Academy Awards	Omo Elemosho	Best Nigerian Film	Nominated
2016	2016 Best of Nollywood Awards	Eni-Owo	Director of the Year	Nominated
2023	2023 Africa Magic Viewers' Choice Awards	King of Thieves	Best Director	Nominated
2024	2024 Africa Magic Viewers' Choice Awards	Jagun Jagun	Best Writing – Movie	Nominated
2024	2024 Africa Magic Viewers' Choice Awards	Jagun Jagun	Best Director	Nominated
2024	Best of Nollywood Awards	Jagun Jagun	Director of the Year	Won

== See also ==
- List of highest-grossing Nigerian films
