= Lateef Adedimeji =

Nigerian actor

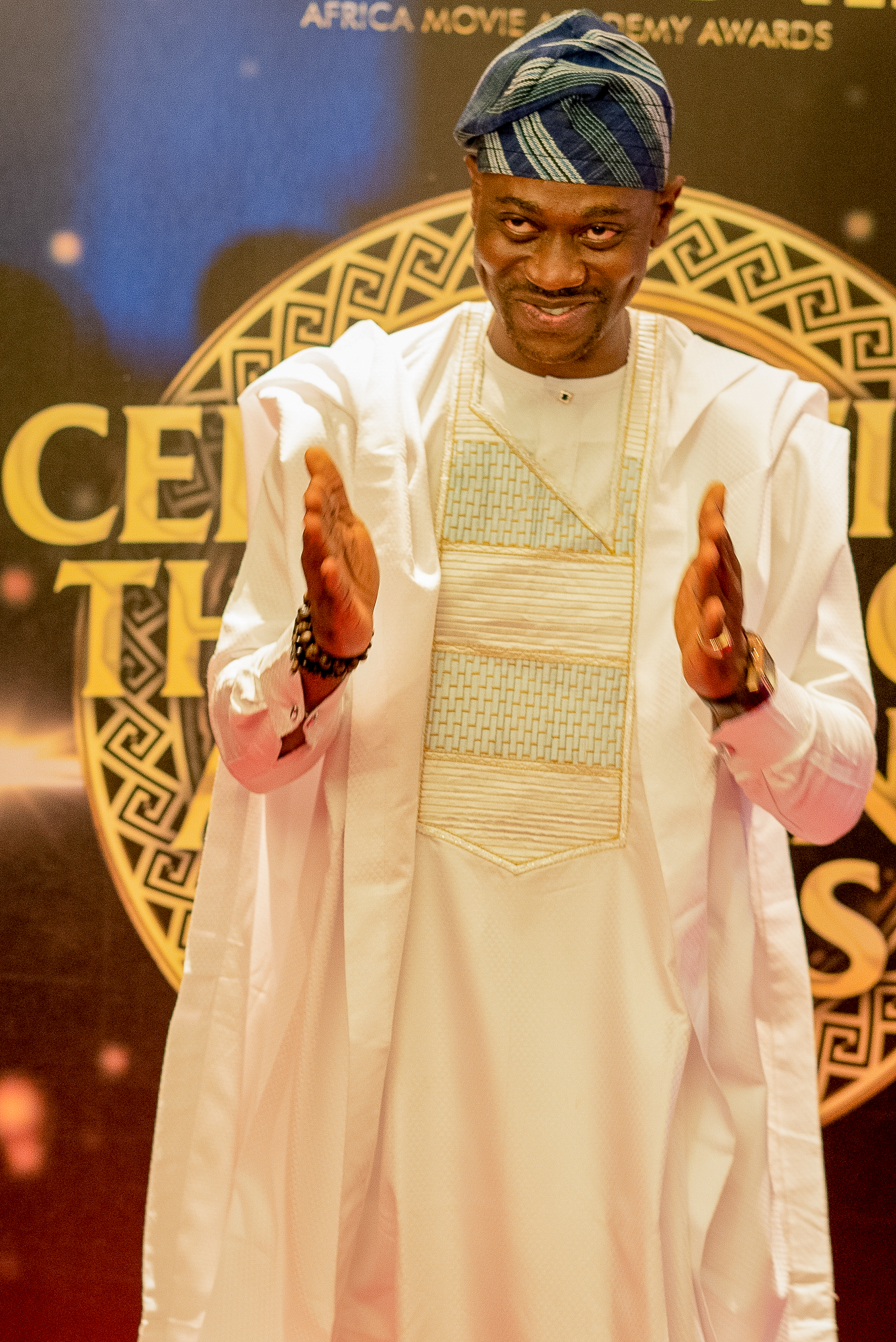
- Adedimeji at the 2021 Africa Movie Academy Awards
- Born: Abdullateef Adetola Adedimeji; 1 February 1984 (age 42); Isolo, Lagos State, Nigeria
- Other name: "Crying Machine"
- Citizenship: Nigerian
- Education: Olabisi Onabanjo University
- Occupations: Renowned Actor; filmmaker
- Years active: 2007–present
- Known for: Kudi Klepto
- Spouse: Oyebade Adebimpe (m. 2021)
- Awards: 2018 Best of Nollywood Awards—Best Actor in a Lead Role (Yoruba)

Adetola Abdullateef Adedimeji (born 1 February 1984) is a Nigerian actor and filmmaker. He gained popularity with his first major role in Yewande Adekoya's 2013 movie titled Kudi Klepto and has acted in over 100 Nigerian movies since he began acting 15 years ago. He is currently a brand ambassador for Airtel and Numatville Megacity.

== Early life ==
Lateef Adedimeji was born on 1 February 1984 in Isolo, Lagos State, southwestern Nigeria. He is a native of Abeokuta, Ogun State.

== Education ==
Lateef started his primary education at Ire Akari Primary School, Isolo, Lagos State, and went to Ilamoye Grammar School Okota Lagos for his secondary school education. He also attended a performance studio workshop at Onikan Lagos State where he had his performance training. His writing and acting skills were also developed in a Non-governmental organization (NGO) (Community Life Project). He graduated from Olabisi Onabanjo University, where he obtained a bachelor's degree in Mass Communication.

== Career ==
Lateef Adedimeji began his acting career in 2007, started his career with dancing, and was enrolled in a dancing school. He is an Actor and Screenwriter and has featured in various stage roles since when he was 15 but he started acting in 2007 when he joined Orisun TV. He started acting while in secondary school and he was picked by an NGO to serve as an informer and counselor during an HIV/AIDS campaign. His role was to educate the general public on sexual-related issues and human rights by creating video content in which he acted. Fans know him for playing the role of an emotional character who cries often. He has starred in several Nigerian films over the years alongside major names in the movie industry. In 2016, he won 2016 Best of Nollywood Awards for Best Actor in a Lead Role (Yoruba). In 2015, he was nominated for City People Entertainment Awards for the 2015 Most Promising Actor of the year. Lateef is widely confused to be related to popular Nigerian actor Odunlade Adekola due to their uncanny resemblance and sense of humor. He was equally opportune to work with UNICEF due to his writing prowess. He was awarded the face of Nollywood male during the ENigeria Newspaper Night of Honour on 30 October 2021.

== Personal life ==
On 18 December 2021, Adedimeji wedded his partner, who is also an actress, Oyebade Adebimpe in a colorful wedding.

== Filmography ==
- Kudi Klepto (2015)
- Yeye Oge (2016)
- Once Upon a Time (2017)
- Ilu Ominira (2018)
- Bipolar (Àmódí) (2018)
- Bina Baku (2019)
- Depth (2019)
- Koto (2019)
- Igi Aladi (2019)
- Adebimpe Omooba (2019)
- Sugar Rush (2019) as Kpala
- Olokiki Oru (2019)
- The New Patriots (2020) as Fred
- Rugudu (2020) as Chibuzor
- Veil (2020)
- Soole (2021) as Julius
- Beauty and the Beast (2021)
- Breaded Life (2021) as Jugunu
- Dwindle (2021) as Fuku
- Ayinla (2021) as Ayinla
- Progressive Tailors Club (2021) as Saheed
- Love Castle (2021) as Chi Joshua
- A Naija Christmas (2021) as Tony Torpedo
- Prophetess (2021) as Ezekiel
- That One Time (2022)
- King of Thieves (2022) as Abegunde
- Order of Things (2022) as Larry
- Strangers (2022)
- Romeo (2022) as Anjola
- Ojukoro (2022) as Bayo
- Ile Alayo (2022)
- Different Strokes (2023) as Tade
- The Last Man Standing (2023)
- Jagun Jagun (2023) as Gbotija
- 5 Billion Reasons (2023) as Maximus
- Imade (2023) as Pastor
- She Must Be Obeyed (2023) as Bayo
- Hotel Labamba (2024)
- Aníkúlápó: The Rise of Spectre (2024) as Awolaran
- House of Ga'a (2024) as Lubu
- Lisabi: The Uprising (2024) as Lisabi Agbongbo Akala
- Queen Lateefah (2024)
- The Beads (2024) as Demola
- Lakatabu (2024) as Prince Adetola
- Crossroads (2024) as Fela
- Beast of Two Worlds (2024) as Alani
- The Notebook (2024) as Gbolahan
- Red Circle (2025)
- Gingerrr (2025)

== Awards and honors ==
| Year | Award ceremony | Prize | Result | Ref |
|---|---|---|---|---|
| 2014 | Odua Movie Awards | Best Actor | Won | |
| 2015 | Odua Movie Awards | Best Actor | Won | |
| 2015 | Best of Nollywood Awards | Best Actor in a Lead Role (Yoruba) | Nominated | |
| 2015 | City People Entertainment Awards | Most Promising Actor of the Year (Yoruba) | Nominated | |
| 2016 | City People Entertainment Awards | Best Supporting Actor Of The Year (Yoruba) | Won | |
| 2016 | Best of Nollywood Awards | Best Actor in a Lead Role (Yoruba) | Nominated | |
| 2018 | Best of Nollywood Awards | Best Actor in a Lead Role (Yoruba) | Won | |
| 2018 | City People Movie Awards | Best Actor Of The Year (Yoruba) | Nominated | |
| 2019 | Best of Nollywood Awards | Best Actor in a Lead Role (Yoruba) | Nominated | |
| 2019 | Best of Nollywood Awards | Best Supporting Actor (Yoruba) | Won | |
| 2020 | 2020 Best of Nollywood Awards | Best Actor in a Lead role –Yoruba | Nominated | |
| 2021 | Africa Movie Academy Awards | Best Actor in a Leading Role | Nominated | |
| 2022 | Hollywood and African Prestigious Awards (HAPA Awards) | Best Actor in Africa | Won | |
| 2023 | Africa International Film Festival | Globe Award Honoree | Won | |
| 2024 | 2024 Africa Magic Viewers' Choice Awards | Best Lead Actor | Nominated | |
| 2025 | 2025 Africa Magic Viewers' Choice Awards | Best Lead Actor | Nominated | |

== See also ==
- List of Yoruba people
