= Kunle Remi =

Nigerian actor

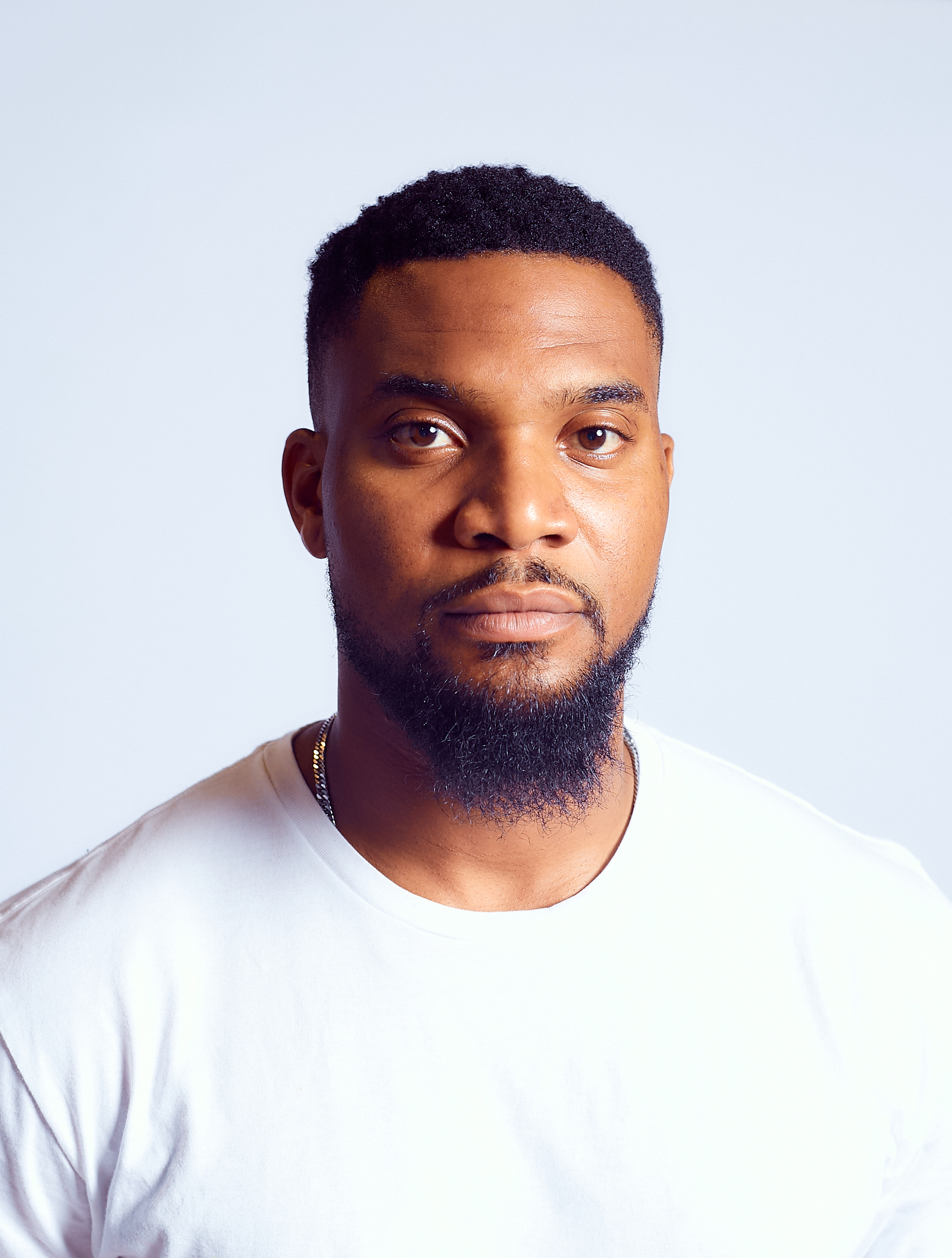
- Remi in 2023
- Born: Oyekunle Opeyemi Oluwaremi; Gboko, Benue State, Nigeria
- Education: University of Ibadan; New York Film Academy
- Occupation: Actor
- Years active: 2010–present
- Spouse: Tiwi (m. 2023)

Oyekunle Opeyemi Oluwaremi, known professionally as Kunle Remi, is a Nigerian singer, producer, and model. He appeared in the films Falling and Aníkúlápó, the television series Tinsel, and won the 7th edition of Gulder Ultimate Search in 2010. While studying at the New York Film Academy, he also hosted an internet television channel, Celebville 360. He hosted the Academy Awards nomination event in Beverly Hills. In 2012, he was cast in his first movie, Heavy Beauty, produced by Grace Edwin Okon and directed by Stanlee Ohikhuare. Though he graduated in 2014, he returned to study filmmaking and directing, and graduated in 2015.

== Early life and education ==
Remi was born on 18 October in Gboko Local Government Area of Benue State, Nigeria. His family relocated to Ibadan when he was a child. As a teenager, he developed an interest for acting and became a youth drama teacher.

He studied fisheries and wildlife management at the University of Ibadan, in Oyo State, Nigeria. He then attended Sheffield University and studied tourism and hospitality management. After completing his studies, he moved to New York City to study acting, filmmaking, and directing at the New York Film Academy, graduating in 2014.

== Early work ==
Remi started acting professionally in 2011, after winning Gulder Ultimate Search in 2010. His first on-screen appearance was in the 2012 film Heavy Beauty. In 2014, he began performing stunts in Kpains: The Frest of Souls. He spent 2015 landing roles in the short films Sister's Keeper, Sting, and Hex, and being cast in the television series The Getaway, where he played Oliseh. He then played roles in Out of Luck, Deluded and Mrs. & Mrs. Johnson. His breakthrough role came from Falling, where he played a husband left in a coma after a tragic accident.

== Career ==
=== 2016 ===
On 5 February 2016, Any Other Monday was released. It portrays the trials and tribulations of love and marriage. Remi went on to star in a similar film – highlighting the struggle and illusions of love – which was released 9 September. Throughout the year, he starred in two television series. The first, Lincoln's Clan Evolution, depicts a Nigerian billionaire and his family. He played Eric and completed his role in 2017. The second was Tinsel, a Nigerian soap opera that began filming in 2008. Remi was cast in 2016 as a day player and continued with his role of Zane into 2017.

=== 2017 ===
Remi accepted various alternate roles throughout 2017. He took on the role of Lolu in Tiwa's Baggage, about an abandoned woman with a child. On 12 April, Sobi's Mystic was released; he played a slightly lighter role in this romantic drama. Sobi, the actor's character, finds his promiscuous tendencies land him in trouble when the woman he finds and becomes drawn to doesn't reciprocate his feelings. Digging him deeper into who she is. The film received a rating of 4/5 from the Nollywood Reinvented for its unpredictability and details.

On 24 July, Alter Ego was released. Written by Jude Martins, the film tells the story of a lawyer who prosecutes sex offenders and the lengths she will go to find justice in whatever she sees fit. Yet, as a fellow victim herself, she is driven by her own sexual drive and power, no matter the time and place. The film was nominated for Best Film with Social Messages and Film with Best Production Design at the Best of Nollywood Awards. As well as leading roles, Omotola Jalade Ekeinde and Remi were nominated for Best Kiss in a Film. In September, Surprise Wedding, telling the story of an arranged marriage.

Remi, who plays Tunde, is surprised on his birthday with a wedding rather than a birthday party. He is forced to walk the aisle as his inheritance is tied to his marital status. To finish off his diverse on-screen roles, he took on the breast cancer awareness film Purple Hearts.

=== 2018 ===
Remi began his year starring in Stronger Together, as Jide, a pediatrician who contemplates suicide due to his family pressuring him into marriage. This leads to a late-night sorrowing session in a bar and meeting a new connection that could very much alter his path. By 3 February, Forbidden was released and was a hit. He played a role in this television series that follows forbidden lovers who are outed by an ex. The Eve, released on 30 March 2018, was considered "the most colorful and beautiful shot film," with an eye-pleasing cast. The romantic comedy features Remi as Audu and Adeolu Adefarasin as Funsho. The storyline follows Funsho's risky decisions when he meets someone else at his bachelorette party. The film appeared on Netflix on 12 October 2020.

=== 2019 ===
Remi starred in Boys Will Be Boys, released on 14 February, where Mike lies to his soon-to-wed wife about the wild bachelor party that comes back to haunt him. On the same day, Sin City was released. He and co-star Yvonne Nelson played a couple who decided a vacation is the best way to boost their relationship but are tested in unexpected ways. While he played significant roles in these productions, Gold Statue, released on 17 May 2019, had the actor leading alongside Gabriel Afolayan. Director Tade Ogidan, CEO of OGD Pictures, came out of an eight-year hiatus to see the project through after it was written in 1991.

It was nominated for an Africa Movie Academy Award for Best Nigerian Film, and won Best Actor in a Lead role, Best Sound, and Best Use of Makeup and of Nigerian Costume in a film. It was also nominated for Best Movie of The Year, Director of the Year and Best Production Design. The film follows Wale (Afolayan) and Chike (Remi) who go in search of the treasured gold statue which is believed to be a deity inherited by their generation. Quagmire, released 3 December, was another film Remi starred in alongside actress Matilda Obaseki. His character, Kolade, receives a shocking surprise when his wife invites another woman into their home to spice up their love life. This was considered a great acting piece as he was able to let the "character shine through him."

=== 2020 ===
Despite the coronavirus pandemic starting, Remi featured in lead or supporting roles in upwards of 14 films. His first significant role was in JOCA (Just A Call Away), which was a push to help those needing to exercise the necessary precautions during the pandemic. Remi plays Richard who has just come home from overseas and is showing symptoms of the virus. His pregnant wife, played by Bolaji Ogunmola, is worried and wants him to be properly tested, but he would rather trust the Lord's help than take responsibility. The short 35-minute film looked to help those in isolation centers and bring ease to the process needing to take place. Mama Drama is considered one of his top ten films. The Nigerian drama film hosts a mecca of film stars and explores the experience of a woman who undergoes many miscarriages and hires her assistant as her surrogate. Later that month, Remi co-produced and was a part of fellow Nollywood actress, Joy Idoko, new film Lemonade. The actress turned producer, wanted to highlight toxic relationships as a single mother in following her dreams. With plenty of short film experience, 12 Seasons was another notch on his belt as the movie highlights the struggles of newlywed couples. However, his role in Introducing the Kujus (now streaming on Amazon Prime Video) grossed ₦10 million and went on to win Best Writing at the 2022 Africa Magic Viewers' Choice Awards.

=== 2021 ===
The Prophetess, released on 2 April, follows Ajoke the prophetess and his Lagos-based OAP, Dipo, played by Remi. His first major film of the year was Gone. Initially screened at the Calgary Black Film Festival, it officially came out to the public on 16 July 2021. In his first Netflix film, he plays a supporting role as a stockbroker. The film is considered one of the best in Nollywood for 2021. Though his following role, as playboy turned lover Akinola ‘Owoblow’ Owolabi, would give him a run for his money. 13 Letters show the backlash sleeping around can get you. Once all the women got together to shame his name, a public relations agent (PR) must help him fix himself. The Nollywood crime thriller Hide and Seek, directed by Tolu Awobiyi and Adekunle-Bryan Oyetunde, follows Remi's lead role as James. Later that month April Showers was released. Currently out on Amazon Prime Video, the film sits at a 4.5/5 rating and was enjoyed by its audience. His first Christmas film, A Naija Christmas by Kunle Afolayan, was released on 16 December and was Remi's first official leading role in a Netflix original film. He plays Ugo, one of three brothers who have been sent into a competition by their mother's wish. Who can find a wife first?

=== 2022 ===
Throughout the year, Remi landed roles in Saint Oyinda, Borrowed Wealth, Treasury, the television series Deserted, and Anikulapo. Saro, played by Remi, is a simple traditional textile weaver who becomes intertwined with Queen Arolake who is played by previous co-star Bimbo Ademoye. In its first week, it became one of the top 10 films in 24 countries on Netflix, and was listed as the number one film in Nigeria in its first week. On top of this, the movie was awarded with Best Indigenous Language (Yoruba), Best Overall Movie, Best Sound Editor (Movie/TV series), Best Writer (Movie/TV series), and Best Sound Track (Movie/TV series) at the 2023 Africa Magic Viewers' Choice Awards (AMCVA). He finished the year with the release of the crime thriller Woke, released on 4 November. The movie is about a P.I.’s mission to retrieve the kidnapped daughter of a renowned Kingpin. On 23 December, Ijakumo was released. The story follows the daughter of a powerful spiritualist, Asabi, who is going to destroy her ex's life. Remi plays the shady Pastor Jide, who she is trying to destroy.

== Producing ==
Sting, a short film released in 2013, was produced by Remi and screened at the Zimbabwe Film Festival. Later, in 2019, Lemonade was produced and distributed across multiple streaming platforms in Nigeria, including DStv and YouTube.

== TV hosting ==
While studying at the New York Film Academy, Remi worked as a host for an internet TV channel, Celebville 360. In 2013, he attended his first appearance reporting live at the Academy Awards nomination event in Beverly Hills, California. As his work on the screen expanded, his next hosting job was not until 2021. As a taskmaster, he returned to the Gulder Ultimate Search Season 12 with fellow host Toke Makinwa. The following year, he had the opportunity to be the green carpet host of the 2022 Glo Dance Battle of the Year with Moet Abebe. He also had a judging role in Dance Naija Dance by Zee World alongside Sashin Kandhaj, Kenneth Agabata, Uraysha Ramrachia and hosts Daniel K. Daniel and Pelumi Busari. Starting 6 August, the show ran every Saturday and Sunday for 10 weeks. Later that same year, on 3 and 4 November 2022, Remi anchored the Woman in Management, Business and Public Service (WIMBIZ) Africa where author Chimamanda Ngozi Adichi was a keynote speaker. Remi then appeared on 23 November as the moderator at the Sterling Leadership Series: Born in Blackness, where the series interviewed journalist and author Howard French. Then to the Culturati, the largest art and cultural event in Nigeria, where they partnered with Creative Youth Community Development Initiative (CYCDI) – Solution17 to create the "Lagos Green Economy in Arts and Culture." The 27 November 2022, event was hosted by Remi, Osas Ighodaro, Bianca Ugowanne, and Princess Marinay. By 21 December, Remi went back to the creative side and hosted the Fuze Talent Hunt. Produced by Stanbic IBTC Holdings Pension Managers Limited, the talent hunt sought out "indigenous talents and help them explore their creativity and business prowess through the initiative."

== Modelling ==
Remi began his modeling career with ISIS models at the age of 24. He has since been featured in ad campaigns for brands like Airtel (formerly Zain), Arise Magazine, DStv, MTN Nigeria, The Reele Magazine, and Diamond Bank (now Access Bank).

== Personal life ==
Remi spoke in December 2022 about depression, stating how overwhelmed he felt at various points on his journey as an actor. "I was thinking too much of my career, am I doing enough, am I enough, am I with the right person, so many thoughts in my mind."

On January 1, 2024, Remi married his girlfriend Tiwi, announcing their marriage on his Instagram page.

== Future projects ==
Remi is co-founder of 1810 Empire Studios, founded in 2012 and previously listed as The 7th Media Entertainment. Their three verticals, 1810 management, 1810 Studios, and 1810 Impact, all have projects in the works. 1810 Studios has two feature films currently active – a limited series on love chronicles with the youth demographic and a talk-variety show. 1810 Impact looks to help those in need. Remi is the founder of Men Against Rape and Violence (MARV), a social imperative bringing awareness of the impact sexual assault has on men, women, and youth through visual stories.

== Filmography ==
=== Film ===
| Year | Title | Role | Notes | Ref |
|---|---|---|---|---|
| 2015 | Falling | Imoh | Produced by Uduak Isong Oguamanam and directed by Niyi Akinmolayan. | |
| 2016 | Any Other Monday | Greg | Produced by Kafui Danko and directed by Pascal Amanfo. | |
| 2017 | Tiwa's Baggage | Lolu | Written and directed by Biodun Stephen. | |
| 2017 | Sobi's Mystic | Sobi | Written and directed by Biodun Stephen. | |
| 2017 | Alter Ego | Daniel | Produced by Sidomex Universal. Written by Esther Eyibio. Directed by Moses Inwang. | |
| 2017 | Surprise Wedding | Tunde | Written by Tunde Apalowo and Nkechi Okere. Directed by Chris Eneaji Eneng. | |
| 2017 | Purple Heart | Ademola | Written by Awotedu. Directed by Andy Amenechi. | |
| 2018 | Stronger Together | Jide | Written by Emmanuel Anyaka. Directed by Austin Nwaolie. | |
| 2018 | The Eve | Audu | Produced by Cut24. Directed by Tosin Igho. Available on Netflix. | |
| 2019 | Boys Will Be Boys | TJ | Written by Rita Onwurah. Directed by Chris Eneaji Eneng. | |
| 2019 | Sin City | Phil | Written and directed by Pascal Amanfo. | |
| 2019 | Gold Statue | Chike | Written, produced and directed by Tade Ogidan. | |
| 2019 | Kpali | Jidenna | | |
| 2019 | Quagmire | Kolade | Written by Frances Okeke. Directed by A.N.U. | |
| 2020 | JOCA (Just One Call Away) | Richard | Short film. Written by Umanu Elijah and Christian Nzekwe. Directed by Umanu Elijah. | |
| 2020 | Mama Drama | Gboyega | Written by Bimbo Akinbode, Temitope Bolade and Diche Ununwa. Produced by Joy Grant-Ekong. Directed by Seyi Babatope. | |
| 2020 | Lemonade | Uyi Eromosele | Written by Lummie Edevbie, Alexandra Kureave Hul and Joy Idoko. Produced by Joy Idoko and Remi. Directed by Lummie Edevbie. | |
| 2020 | Introducing the Kujus | Mauyan | Written by Mannie Oiseomaye, Biodun Stephen and Donald Tombia. Directed by Biodun Stephen. | |
| 2020 | Maybe Mine | Eric | Written by Gift Collins. Directed by Chris Eneaji Eneng. | |
| 2020 | No More Secret | Isaac | Written by Temitope Bolade, Diche Enunwa, Chinneylove Eze. Directed by Saheed Apanpa. | |
| 2020 | Camouflage | Wilson | Written by Ezinne Akam. Directed by Adeoluwa Owu. | |
| 2020 | Volcano | Tim | Written by Ovi Odiete. Directed by Onesoul. | |
| 2021 | The Prophetess | Dipo | Written by Niyi Akinmolayan, Yusuf Carew, Amaka Chidioka. Directed by Niyi Akinmolayan. | |
| 2021 | 13 Letters | Akinola ‘Owoblow’ Owolabi | Written by Pearl Agwu and Kikelomo Moronkeji. Directed by Kayode Peters. | |
| 2021 | Hide ‘N’ Seek | James Kokori | Written by Bode Asiyanbi. Directed by Tolu Lordtanner and Adekunle Bryan Oyetunde. | |
| 2021 | April Showers | Derek | Written by Pacass Adebayo. Directed by Richards Omos-Iboyi. | |
| 2021 | A Naija Christmas | Ugo | Written by Kemi Adesoye. Directed by Kunle Afolayan. Available on Netflix. | |
| 2021 | Still Falling | Tunde | | |
| 2022 | Treasury | Shina | Written by Leo Orji. Directed by Chris Eneaji Eneng. | |
| 2022 | Aníkúlápó | Saro | Written by Shola Dada. Directed and produced by Kunle Afolayan. | |
| 2022 | Ijakumo (The Born Again Stripper) | Pastor Jide | Written by Anthony Kehinde Joseph. Directed by Adebayo Tijani. | |
| 2023 | The Kujus Again | Mauyan | Directed by Biodun Stephen. | |
| 2023 | Love, Lust, & Other Things | Soji | Directed by Kayode Kasum. | |
| 2023 | Purple | | Directorial debut by Kunle Remi. | |
| 2023 | Untamed | Muyiwa | Directed by Biodun Stephen, Written by Mannie Oiseomaye. | |
| 2023 | Chaos Calling | Kamoru | Directed by Biodun Stephen, Written by Biodun Stephen | |
| 2023 | Baby Maker | Mofe | Directed by Orimz, Written by Adaora Udeh | |
| 2023 | Playing By Heart | | Directed by Chinedu Omorie | o |
| 2023 | Flaws | Sevi Brown | Directed by Diana Childs and Uyoyou Adia. | |
| 2023 | Something Like Gold | Tunde | Directed by Kayode Kasum | |
| 2024 | Ruse | Derick | Directed by Great Valentine Edochie | |
| 2024 | Queen Lateefah | Jide Rhodes | Directed by Adeoluwa Owu | |
| 2024 | Love Notes | Bash | Directed by Michael Akinrogunde | |
| 2024 | Shining Star | Philip | Directed by Great Valentine Edochie | |
| 2024 | Muri & Ko | Muri | Directed by Biodun Stephen | |
| 2024 | What About Us | David | Directed by Kayode Kasum, | |
| 2024 | Aníkúlápó (Rise of Spectre) | Saro | Written by Shola Dada. Directed and produced by Kunle Afolayan. | |
| 2025 | Aso Ebi Diaries | | | |

=== Television ===
| Year | Title | Role | Notes | Ref |
|---|---|---|---|---|
| 2014 | The Getaway | Oliseh | | |
| 2016–2017 | Lincoln's Clan | Eric | | |
| 2016–2017 | Tinsel | Zane | Aired on Africa Magic. | |
| 2018 | Forbidden | Demilade Doregos | Aired on Africa Magic. | |
| 2022 | Deserted | Chijioke | Written by Udezeh Onyinye. Directed by Adaeze Ibechukwu. | |
| 2025 | The Party | | Directed by Ope Ajayi | |

== Awards and nominations ==
| Year | Award | Category | Result | Ref |
|---|---|---|---|---|
| 2019 | Best of Nollywood Awards | Best Supporting Actor – English | Nominated | |
| 2020 | Best of Nollywood Awards | Best Kiss in a movie | Won | |
| 2022 | Yoruba Movie Gist Awards | Best Cinema Actor | Won | |
| 2023 | Cine Paris Film Festival | Best Actor in a Feature Film | Won | |
| 2023 | Nigeria Achievers Awards 2023 | Nollywood Best Lead Actor | Won | |
| 2023 | AFRICON 2023 | African Excellence for outstanding achievement in the field of Media & Entertainment | Won | |
| 2023 | Scream All Youth Award 2023 | Best Actor in a Lead Role - Anikulapo | Won | |
| 2023 | Toronto International Nollywood Film Festival (TINFF) 2023 | Best Actor - Flaws | Won | |
| 2023 | African International Film Festival (AFRIFF) 2023 | Globe Award Honoree - Anikulapo | Won | |
| 2024 | Silverbird Man of the Year 2023 | Nollywood Trailblazer | Won | |

== See also ==
- List of Nigerian actors
