= Kanyin Eros =

Nigerian-American Actress

- Born: Kanyinsola Busola Erogbogbo; 24 August 1996 (age 30); Lagos, Nigeria
- Citizenship: Nigerian-American
- Education: College of Medicine, University of Lagos
- Occupation: Actress
- Notable work: Ireti, Muri & Ko, Journey To Bloom

Kanyinsola Busayo Erogbogbo, known professionally as Kanyin Eros, is a Nigerian-American actress best known for her role as Liya Hassan in the series Journey To Bloom and the titular character Ireti.

== Background ==
Kanyin was born in Lagos, Nigeria. She attended Lagoon Secondary School and earned a Bachelor of Dental Surgery degree at the College of Medicine, University of Lagos.

== Career ==
Kanyin studied acting at the Blackbox Acting Studio in Chicago and the Chicago Actors Studio. In 2021, she debuted as Caro in Caro-Lina. In 2022, she appeared as Marjorie Joy in the series, The Other Wife. In June 2024, she starred in the comedy Muri & Ko directed by Biodun Stephen. In the same year, she played Liya Hassan in the TV series Journey To Bloom, and the titular character Ireti, directed by FESPACO-winning actor & director Temi Ami-Williams. The film, based on Williams' journey beating cancer, was produced by FilmLab Africa (funded by the British Council) and premiered at the Nigerian International Film and TV Summit (NIFS). It also screened at the 13th edition of the Africa Intertional Film Festival (AFRIFF) in November 2024. Kanyin featured in an episode of the 5th season of the comedy series Visa On Arrival. In December 2024, Kanyin starred in the stage play High, her second project directed by Williams. The play was produced by Ade Laoye, known for the hit 2023 Netflix film, The Black Book.

Kanyin Eros has also gained attention across social media for the monologue series The Secret Lives Of Nigerian Women spotlighting the lives of several iconic Nigerian women including Chioma Ajunwa, Margret Ekpo, Agbani Darego, Sandra Aguebor Ekperuoh, Funmilayo Ransome-Kuti and Ladi Dosei.
