= A Simple Lie (film) =

2021 Nigerian film

- Directed by: Biodun Stephen
- Written by: Mannie Oiseomaye
- Produced by: Biodun Stephen
- Starring: Bisola Aiyeola; Emmanuel Ikubese; Bolaji Ogunmola; Oluwabukunmi Adeaga-Ilori; Kachi Nnochiri
- Cinematography: Ladipo Abiola Lawrence Morgan
- Edited by: Adesuwa Omon Adio Solanke
- Release date: July 2021

A Simple Lie is a 2021 Nigerian romantic comedy film. It was co-produced by Biodun Stephen and David Wade Production. The film was released four months after her commitment with Anthill Studio's Progressive Tailors Club, and it stars Bisola Aiyeola, Emmanuel Ikubese, Bolaji Ogunmola, Bukunmi Adeaga-ilori and Kachi Nnochiri.

== Synopsis ==
Five friends were secretly having affairs with one another. They were surprised when it was eventually discovered through the terminal illness of one of them. They thought it was a small lie but realised that even a small lie matters.

== Cast ==
- Bukunmi Adeaga-ilori as Fade
- Bisola Aiyeola as Boma
- Emmanuel Ikubese as Azeem
- Kachi Nnochiri as Xavier
- Bolaji Ogunmola as Donna
- Daniel Abua as Nosa
- Tope Ajao as Better Half agent
- Sarah Ebegbe as Azeem's secretary
- Claudia Thomas as Buka worker
- Biodun Stephen as Boma's mum

== Release ==
The film premiered in cinemas on 25 March 2021 before its official release in July 2021.

== Box office ==
According to the Cinema Exhibitors Association of Nigeria (CEAN), about ₦346.6 million was realised from ticket sales in the Nollywood industry in March 2021. A Simple Lie was the second highest-grossing film between 25 and 27 March, earning a box office revenue of ₦9,809,900.
