= Husbands of Lagos =

- Directed by: Kabat E. Egbon
- Country of origin: Nigeria
- No. of seasons: 3

Production
- Producer: Mary Remmy Njoku
- Production company: Rok Studios

Original release
- Release: December 1, 2015

Husbands of Lagos is a Nigerian television series produced by ROK Studios and directed by Kabat E. Egbon. The series, which debuted on December 1, 2015, tells the story of seven men living in Lagos and the women in their lives.

The second season of the series was released on November 2, 2016, and the third season premiered on April 12, 2017.

== Synopsis ==
In Lagos; a melting pot of business, politics, power and love, the city that never sleeps, a playground for both rich and poor, a place where dreams become real and the delicate mix of the good, the bad and the ugly forms a tapestry of intrigue, secrets, deceit and romance for the Husbands Of Lagos.

== Cast and characters ==
- Bolanle Ninalowo as Wale, a playboy who always has beautiful women interested in him, but also finds himself in trouble as his womanizing ways are discovered.
- Bobby Obodo as Tosan, a married man who has failed at several business ventures. He relies on his wealthy and slightly older wife, Aisha, for pocket money and investment into his business schemes.
- Uche Odoputa as Livinus, a married man and father of two. He runs a successful appliance retail store and cares very much for his family. Livinus can be very old fashioned and believes his wife is his property, often calling her his "Ego Oyinbo" (foreign currency) because of her expensive bride price.
- Kenneth Okolie as Akinlolu, a newlywed and soon-to-be father. He comes from a wealthy family of great social status and has recently taken over his late father's responsibilities in the family business. He and his pregnant wife live with his mother.
- Rich Tanksley as Josef, a divorced expat living in Lagos, and one of Akinlolu's business associates. He is dating Esohe, a local girl who may or may not want him for his money.
- Jennifer Eliogu as Mrs. Tade Williams, Akinlolu's mother and the matriarch of the wealthy Tade Williams family. She is primarily concerned with tradition, proper social etiquette, and upholding her husband's legacy.
- Mary Njoku as Annie, Akinlolu's wife who is pregnant with their first child. She is headstrong and mischievous, both traits that she needs to cope with living under the older Mrs. Tade Williams' roof. She often confides her frustration about her mother-in-law with her best friend, Isioma.
- Susan Peters as Aisha, Tosan's wife of 3 years. She is financially well off as the manager of a bank and gives generously to her husband and friends. She is often frustrated with Tosan because she wants to have children and meet his family. Meanwhile, Tosan shows no interest in indulging either of her two desires.
- Peggy Ovire as Isioma, Livinus' wife who is a stay at home mother. She often feels trapped and wishes to spend more time outside the house by either attending classes as she works on her thesis or taking on a job, but her husband disapproves. Similar to Annie, she often finds a way to assert herself and do what she wants.
- Moyo Lawal as Najite, an important woman in Tosan's life. She is Tosans first love and the mother of his 2 kids. She comes to Lagos to live with Aisha and Tosan but as Tosans “sister.”
- Yvonne Jegede-Fawole as Ada, Wale's girlfriend who is based in the US and surprised Wale at his home in Lagos. To Wale’s surprise, Oma and Ada are cousins.
- Genny Uzoma as Oma, Wale's girlfriend who is based in Lagos. Oma is Ada's cousin, and unbeknownst to either woman, both have been dating the same man.
- Mofe Duncan as Owen, Akin's childhood friend who also comes from a wealthy family. Owen is also Adas boyfriend back in the U.S. Owen and Wale become friends through Akinlolu and are both unknowingly, dating Ada.
- Desmond Elliot as Saheed, a bartender who works at the men’s favorite hang-out spot.
- Bisola Aiyeola as Sikira, Saheed's baby mama.
- Rukky Sanda as Remi, Akin's evil sister.
- Oluwajimi Odukoya as Fred, the new husband on the block. Fred doesn’t really know how to appreciate his wife, but she doesn’t know how to allow him to be a man.

== Location ==
All scenes from seasons 1-3 were shot in Lagos, Nigeria. Nightclub scenes were shot at Rumors Nightclub in Ikeja GRA, Lagos. Bedroom scenes were shot in various hotels around Lagos. The scene where Esohe pawns Josef's engagement ring was shot in Rich Tanksley's house in Lekki, Lagos.
