= Big Love (2023 film) =

- Directed by: Biodun Stephen
- Written by: Biodun Stephen
- Produced by: Inkblot Productions; Biodun Stephen
- Starring: Timini Egbuson; Bimbo Ademoye; Teniola Aladese; Shafy Bello; Koleosho Hismaheel; Ronke Ojo; Ossy Joseph; Isioma Mordi; Deza the Great; Jedida Jo James; Jennifer Ugokwe; Malvin Joseph
- Distributed by: Inkblot Productions
- Release date: June 28, 2023
- Country: Nigeria
- Language: English

Big Love is a 2023 Nigerian romantic family drama written and directed by Biodun Stephen and marks the first collaboration between Biodun Stephen and Inkblot Productions. Released in cinemas nationwide on 28 June 2023, the film stars Bimbo Ademoye, Timini Egbuson, Teniola Aladese, Jaiye Kuti, Shaffy Bello and others. It was shot in Lagos State and depicts modern-day Lagos life.

== Synopsis ==
Big Love tells the story of Adil, a young man who is so passionate about his dreams and chasing them squarely, and Adina, an independent lady who is also really focused on making ends meet at a graduate trainee camp. The two soon begin to fall in love and start building a relationship together, which later becomes threatened by Adina's fears and a secret.

== Cast ==
- Timini Egbuson as Adil
- Bimbo Ademoye as Adina
- Shafy Bello as Kafil
- Jaiye Kuti as Kareema
- Seyi Awolowo as Lade
- Kalu Ikeagwu as Bako
- Teniola Aladese as Kareen
- Gbohunmi Adedayo as event planner
- Adediwura Adesegha as official
- Femi Adisloba as restaurant staff
- Desmond Agbo as panel official
- Elvictor Emmanuel as waiter
- Abiola Azeez as Nanny
- Koleosho Hismaheel as Soft
- Ronke Ojo as deaconess
- Ossy Joseph as John
- Isioma Mordi as fabric store assistant
- Deza the Great as Amir
- Jedida Jo James as Jayden
- Jennifer Ugokwe as panel official
- Malvin Joseph as panel official

== Release and achievement ==
Following its release on 28 June 2023, Big Love made a significant impact at the Nigerian box office, becoming the highest-grossing Nollywood film at the time, earning over ₦20 million in less than a week. The film outperformed Hollywood counterparts such as Transformers: Rise of the Beasts and The Flash at the box office.
