= Ehis =

Ehis or EHIS may refer to:

- Emlyn Hughes International Soccer, a 1988 soccer computer game
- Ehis D'Greatest (Israel Ehinomen Okosun, born 2002), Nigerian Afrobeats singer and songwriter

== See also ==
- Ehi (disambiguation)
- Ehi's Bitters, a 2018 Nigerian film
