= Chris Iheuwa =

Nigerian actor (born 1970)

- Born: 3 August 1970 (age 56)
- Education: University of Ibadan, University of Lagos
- Occupations: Actors, Film Director, Film Producer
- Notable work: Rattle Snake

Chris Iheuwa is a Nigerian actor, film maker and one of the pioneers of Nollywood industry. He is the vice chairman of Actors Guild of Nigeria. He is known for his roles in Rattle Snake (1995), Phone Swap (2012), Joba (2019), The Second Bed (2020), La Femme Anjola (2020), Stranger (2022).

== Education ==
He obtained his first degree from Theatre Arts at the University of Ibadan and Masters degree in University of Lagos.

== Kidnapping controversy ==
Iheuwa was nearly kidnapped in 2021. He was deceived to an unknown location in Port Harcourt where he was eventually rescued by the police.

== Filmography ==
Year produced	Title	Role	Notes
2024	Silence	Arbitrator	Drama
2023	Hotel Labamba	Chief	Comedy / Crime
2023	A Sunday Affair	Sam	Romance
2022	Ran Mi Lowo (Help Me)		
2022	Sistá	Elder	Drama
2022	A True Blue June		
2022	The Wildflower	Barrister Tosan	
2022	Blood Sisters	Sarah's Uncle	TV mini series
2022	Strangers	Dr. Olatunde	
2021	Quit Notice	Barr. Jembewon	
2021	What Happened at St James		
2021	Movement Japa	Uncle Willie	TV series
2021	Progressive Tailors Club	Daddy Junior	
2021	Charge and Bail	Judge Kunle	
2021	13 Letters		Comedy / Drama
2021	Shadow Parties	Ben Akuga	Action
2021	Locked	Lead Police Officer	Short
2021	Prophetess	Baba Osaze	Comedy / Drama
2021	La Femme Anjola	Odera Kalu	
2021	Poor-ish	Adekunle	
2021	Nkiru Special	Chief	
2021	The Cleanser		Drama
2020	Introducing the Kujus	Otunba	
2019	Your Excellency	Senator Adebayo	
2019	Love Is War	Engineer Obaseki	
2018	The Delivery Boy		
2018	Charmed	Mr. Collins	
2017	Isoken	Uncle Mike	
2017	Daddy's Princess		
2014	Render to Caesar		
2012	Phone Swap	Tony	Comedy / Romance
1999	Karishika II		
1999	Rattlesnake 3	Bala	Drama
1997	Owo Blow		
1995	Rattlesnake 2	Bala	Drama
1995	Rattlesnake	Bala	Drama
