= Joba (film) =

2019 Nollywood faith based film

- Directed by: Biodun Stephen
- Written by: Biodun Stephen
- Produced by: Biodun Stephen
- Starring: Blossom Chukwujekwu; Enado Odigie; Chris Ihuewa; Ronke Ojo; Christine Osifuye
- Release dates: May 5, 2019 (Lagos, Nigeria)
- Country: Nigeria
- Language: English

Joba is a 2019 Nollywood faith based movie produced and directed by Biodun Stephen. It is an emotional movie that is based on love, strength and the existence of God. The film stars Blossom Chukwujekwu, Enado Odigie, Chris Ihuewa, Ronke Ojo, and Christine Osifuye.

== Synopsis ==
The film revolves around a Christian family that is battling with balancing between their marriage and faith. Their beliefs were tested when all indications showed that the husband is the cause of the problems.

== Premiere ==
The movie was first premiered on April 5, 2019, at Genesis Cinemas, Maryland Mall, Lagos, Nigeria. The movie was also premiered in Ghana, South Africa, YouTube and BBNaija House. The premiering was graced with celebrities such as Bisola Aiyeola, Woli Arole and Wole Oladiyun.

== Cast ==
- Blossom Chukwujekwu as Lami
- Ayomide Ebegbe as Joba
- Enadio Odigie as Ore
- Ronke Ojo as Ore's Mother
- Chris Iheuwa as Lami's Father
- Peters Ijagbemi as Pastor
- Biodun Stephen as Deaconess Frances
- Christine Osifuye as Doctor.
