= Tanwa Savage =

2021 Nigerian comedy drama film

- Promotional poster
- Directed by: Geshin Salvador
- Written by: Geshin Salvador
- Produced by: Geshin Salvador
- Starring: Segun Arinze; Timini Egbuson; Bimbo Ademoye; Linda Osifo
- Production companies: Royal Heritage Entertainment; Guguru Studios
- Distributed by: Blue Pictures
- Release date: 22 January 2021
- Country: Nigeria
- Language: English
- Budget: ₦8.5 million
- Box office: ₦17.3 million

Tanwa Savage is a 2021 Nigerian comedy drama film produced, written and directed by Geshin Salvador. The film stars Segun Arinze, Timini Egbuson, Bimbo Ademoye and Linda Osifo in the lead roles. The film is based on a true life marriage story where the woman requests a DNA test from her husband. It had its theatrical release on 22 January 2021.

== Cast ==
- Segun Arinze as Jola's father
- Timini Egbuson as Michael
- Bimbo Ademoye as Tosin
- Linda Osifo as Zainab
- Nkechi Blessing as Ngozi
- Uzor Arukwe as Jola
- Joseph Momodu as Maxwell
- Maryam Giwa as theatre doctor
- Kehinde Okunola as Obinna
- Chioma Peters as secretary
- Nora Peters as Doctor Coker
- Geshen Salvador as Goddey
- Oriyomi Taiwo as maid
- Tunde Salau as pedicurist
- Alahaji Yusuf Tairu as Mr. Patrick
