= Gone (2021 film) =

- Directed by: Daniel Ademinokan
- Written by: Daniel Ademinokan
- Produced by: Joy Odiete; Daniel Ademinokan
- Starring: Ada Ameh; Sam Dede; Bimbo Manuel; Bimbo Ademoye
- Production companies: Blue Pictures Studios and Index Two Studios.
- Distributed by: Blue Pictures Studios
- Release date: 2021
- Country: Nigeria
- Language: English

Gone is a 2021 Nigerian emotional and dramatic film written and directed by Daniel Ademinokan. It was co-produced by Joy Odiete and Daniel Ademinokan with Asurf Oluseyi and line producer under the production and distribution company of Blue Pictures Studios in conjunction with Index Two Studios. The movie stars Ada Ameh, Sam Dede, Bimbo Manuel, Bimbo Ademoye and Emma Oh My God.

== Synopsis ==
It follows the story of a young man who leaves his pregnant wife in search of a better life in New York City. He was arrested amidst mobs and sentenced to twenty five years imprisonment. He returned to Nigeria after his imprisonment and he discovered his wife had remarried.

== Cast ==
- Sam Dede as Ani
- Stella Damasus as Ngozi
- Gbenga Titiloye as Philip
- Gabriel Afolayan as Ayochukwu
- Bimbo Ademoye as Anu
- Sophie Alakija s Zainab
- Emma Oh My God as Femi
- Moses Akerele as Tope
- Adebayo Davies as Briggs
- James Jibunma as Ogaga
- Nobert Young as Okwi
- Aderounmu Adejumoke. as Clara

== Premiere ==
The movie was first screened at the five days Calgary Black Film Festival that took place on 26 May to 30 May 2021. The movie premiered globally on 16 July 2021.
