= Breaded Life =

2021 Nigerian comedy-drama film

- Directed by: Biodun Stephen
- Screenplay by: Biodun Stephen
- Produced by: Biodun Stephen; Tara Ajibulu; Kayode Sowade
- Starring: MC Lively; Bisola Aiyeola; Timini Egbuson; Bimbo Ademoye; Bolanle Ninalowo; Adedimeji Lateef; Tina Mba
- Distributed by: Film One
- Release date: 10 April 2021
- Running time: 120 minutes
- Country: Nigeria
- Languages: English; Yoruba; Nigerian Pidgin; Igbo

Breaded Life is a 2021 Nigerian dramedy film written and directed by Biodun Stephen. Co-produced by Biodun Stephen, Tara Ajibulu and Kayode Sowade, it stars Timini Egbuson, Bimbo Ademoye, Tina Mba and Adedimeji Lateef. Breaded Life is a spin-off of the 2016 romantic comedy, Picture Perfect, and features some of the original cast members.

== Plot ==
Similola Smart-Cole is frustrated at her son Sunmi's sloth and apathy despite her repeated warnings. After he is arrested for supposedly breaking into his mother's property, Sunmi is stunned to discover that his family, friends, and acquaintances have denied him, and is banned from returning to the family home. Abandoned in the streets, he takes to begging until Todowede—a cynical bread hawker who had previously warded off the Smart-Cole's security guard Isky's advances—recognises him. She takes him to her mini-flat within the hoi polloi neighbourhood where she accommodates him on the condition that he pays his own way. Todowede continuously derides him throughout his stay there, and the spoilt, entitled Sunmi struggles to adapt to his new life as a bag carrier.

Todowede introduces Sunmi to Jugunu, who offers him a job in his bakery, and Sunmi proves to be a diligent worker, gradually meeting his new boss Jugunu's approval. When Todowede takes ill with malaria, Sunmi nurses her back to health, and upon her recovery, the pair celebrate her birthday, a gesture which touches Todowade. Sunmi also drafts a business plan, which he pitches to Jugunu, and its success leads to a franchise. Despite unwanted advances from Riski Baby—a flirtatious food trader with her sights set on Sunmi—and Todowede's ex-boyfriend Caliltus who had cheated on her, the unlikely pair from different worlds end up together and move into a bigger home.

Similola's nanny, Aunty Agy, visits Todowede's newly established store and is shocked to find Sunmi there. She reveals that his family has been searching for him for the last five years, but Sunmi, remembering how his nearest and dearest had abandoned him, asks her to leave, and he collapses. In the hospital, he wakes up and realises his ordeal had been a dream. Similola visits her son in the hospital, where she narrates how he had stormed out during their argument and gotten into a car accident, which left him in a coma. Sunmi also describes life in his alternate universe during the coma and the friends he had made, including Todowede. Upon discharge, Sunmi spots Todowede selling bread as his mother drives them home, and he jumps out and asks her to come to his house by 9 AM the next day, to which she grudgingly agrees.

In a post-credits scene, as Sunmi pitches his pending bakery business to his mother, Aunty Agy enters to announce that Todowede is outside waiting for Sunmi.

== Cast ==
- Timini Egbuson - Sunmisola Smart-Cole
- Bimbo Ademoye - Todewede
- Tina Mba - Simisola Smart-Cole
- Bisola Aiyeola - Aunty Agy
- Bolanle Ninalowo - Jobe
- Adedimeji Lateef - Jugunu
- MC Lively - Isky
- Amuda Eko - Jigalan
- Funny Bone - New Security Guard
- Jide Kosoko - Police DPO
- Lizzy Jay - Wasilat
- Nkechi Blessing Sunday - Riski Baby
- Tomiwa Sage - Caliltus
- Kayode Freeman - Barrister Yusuf
- Babatunde Isaac - House Cleaner

== Production ==
According to Biodun Stephen, Breaded Life is a true-life story inspired by the experiences of people around her. The production was a joint effort between Shutterspeed Project and David Wade, with filming completed over 16 days. During the shoot in Agege, the team faced challenges, including disruptions from Area Boys, which delayed the filming process.

== Release ==
Breaded Life premiered on April 10, 2021 at iMax Cinema Lagos, and was released nationwide on April 16, l 2021.

== Reception ==
A reviewer for Sodas N Popcorn noted that Breaded Life "hit the right notes" but it had some flaws relating to the plot twist at the end and the general message of the film. Another reviewer concluded that the film was worth the cinema fee, however, noting that Egbuson had been typecast as a spoilt kid while Ninalowo had been typecast as an area boy.

The movie grossed about ₦10 million in the opening weekend and ₦32 million by the second week.
