= Tiwa's Baggage =

2017 film by Biodun Stephen

- Directed by: Biodun Stephen
- Written by: Biodun Stephen
- Starring: Bayray McNwizu; Kunle Remi; Ronke Oshodi Oke; Bolanle Ninalowo
- Production company: ShutterSpeed Projects
- Release date: 2017
- Running time: 91 minutes
- Country: Nigeria

Tiwa's Baggage is a 2017 Nigerian romantic drama film, written and directed by Biodun Stephen. At the 2018 City People Movie Awards, it was nominated for best movie of the year (English) but lost the award to The Wedding Party 2.

== Cast ==
- Bayray McNwizu as Tiwa
- Kunle Remi as Lolu
- Ronke Oshodi Oke as Aunty
- Bolanle Ninalowo as Olly
- Biodun Stephen as Nana
- Kayode Freeman as Pastor
- Casmir Chibuike as Mensah
- Yemi Bamgbose as Uber Driver
- Allwell Ademola as Iyabo

== Reception ==
Pulse outlined the chemistry, acting, story and soundtrack as reasons why the film was a good watch. Nollywood Reinvented gave it a 3/5 rating, who praised the production quality, interpretation of roles and soundtrack. The chronology of sub-plots was also noted as innovation in Nollywood that should be retained. It concluded its review with a consensus that reads "It’s a very well made, sweet little story about small people and the big decisions that they have to make.". It got a 75% rating from True Nollywood Stories, who described the story as "simple and pure". It summarized its review by stating '"great acting, romance & soothing story rhythm all make Tiwa’s Baggage a handful".
