= The Cleanser =

2021 Nigerian thriller film by Mathew Alajogun

- Directed by: James Abinibi
- Written by: Mathew Alajogun
- Story by: Mathew Alajogun
- Produced by: Mathew Alajogun
- Starring: Kehinde Bankole; Bolanle Ninalowo; Alex Osifo; Antar Laniyan
- Release date: 22 January 2021
- Country: Nigeria
- Languages: English & Yoruba

The Cleanser is a 2021 Nigerian thriller film produced and written by Mathew Alajogun and directed by James Abinibi. The film stars Kehinde Bankole, Bolanle Ninalowo, Alex Osifo and Antar Laniyan in the lead roles. The plot of the film revolves around the life of a man whose ambition is to eradicate the corrupted politicians. The film had its theatrical release on 22 January 2021 and opened to mixed reviews from critics.

== Cast ==
- Kehinde Bankole as Funmi Williams
- Bolanle Ninalowo as Oluwole
- Alex Osifo
- Antar Laniyan
- Jide Kosoko
- Chiwetalu Agu
- Stan Nze
- Nkechi Blessing
- Chris Iheuwa
- Oladotun Kayode

== Production ==
The film trailer of the film which was unveiled on 8 January 2021 indicated that the film was directed by James Abinibi. However, according to BBC the film was directed by Mathew Alajogun (on his directorial debut) who is a Nigerian currently resides in the United Kingdom. It was reported that Mathew developed an interest in making the film and progressed with the support he obtained from the MetFilm School in Manchester.
