= Ehi =

Ehi or EHI may refer to:

- Ehi (biblical figure), a minor Old Testament figure
- Ehi (spirit), the name of a personal spirit in some West African religious beliefs
- Endurmenntun Háskóla Íslands, a continuing education centre operated by the University of Iceland
- Energy Helicity Index
- Edinburgh Handedness Inventory, a measurement scale for handedness
- Ihy, an ancient Egyptian child god
