= What's Within =

2014 Nigerian drama film

- Directed by: Rukky Sanda
- Written by: Rukky Sanda
- Release date: 2014
- Country: Nigeria
- Language: English

What's Within is a 2014 Nigerian drama film produced, directed and written by Rukky Sanda.

== Plot ==
This movie is about two young men who have decided to sleep with many women in their youth which comes with its twists and turns.

== Cast ==
- Joseph Benjamin as Derrick
- Alexx Ekubo as Charles
- Bolanle Ninalowo
- Princess Peters
- Rukky Sanda
