= Jennifer Eliogu =

Nigerian actress and singer

- Born: Jennifer Eliogu; 30 April 1976 (age 50)
- Education: Lagos State University and University of Jos
- Occupations: Actress; Singer
- Years active: 1997-Present
- Children: 2
- Awards: City People Entertainment Awards In 2016

Jennifer Eliogu (born April 30, 1976) is a Nigerian actress and singer mainly notable for being an actress. In 2016, Eliogu received the Special Recognition Award at the City People Entertainment Awards for her contributions to the Nigerian movie industry. Eliogu, in 2014 for her role in empowering women, was presented the Award For Excellence at the African Women Leadership Conference which took place in the United States of America.

== Early life and education ==
Eliogu is from Ụmụazụ village in Uke, Nigeria Idemili in Anambra State, a southeastern geographical area of Nigeria but was raised in Lagos state, which is in the southwest of Nigeria. Eliogu obtained a diploma from the University of Jos and obtained her B.Sc. degree from Lagos State University.

== Career ==
Eliogu in 1997 officially debuted into the Nigerian movie industry with the movie titled House On Fire. Eliogu briefly exited the Nigerian movie industry and delved into music professionally in 2012 and released her first music project titled Ifunanya which was nominated for an award in that same year for Best R&B Video at the Nigeria Music Video Awards (NMVA).

Among other notable personalities in Nollywood she has worked include, Rich Tanksley, Kenneth Okolie, Susan Peters, Bolanle Ninalowo, Moyo Lawal, Desmond Elliot, Rukky Sanda among others. She encourages young actresses that talent will take them far and not nudity.

== Awards and recognition ==
=== Acting career ===
Eliogu was awarded the Special Recognition Award at the City People Entertainment Awards in 2016.

She also has an Award for excellence at the 2014 African Women Leadership Conference held in United States Of America for her role in empowering women.

== Music career ==
Eliogu's music project titled Ifunanya was nominated for Best R&B Video at the Nigeria Music Video Awards (NMVA).

== Personal life ==
Eliogu is married and has two children.

== Selected filmography ==
- On the Edge (2024) as Olly
- Uno: The F in Family (2024) Deaconess
- I Do Not Come to You by Chance (2023)
- Wrong Attachment (2023)
- Vindictive (2023)
- Exit Plan (2023)
- The Wrong Side of Goodbye (2023)
- Playing Hearts (2023) as Lady Kate
- Tainted (2022) as Mara's Mum
- Love is a trickster (2022)
- A Frenzy Of Emotion (2022) Mrs. Morgan
- Imposter (2021) as Skye
- Dear Dianne (2019) as Nkechi
- The Relationship (2018) as Toke's Mom
- Who Killed Chief (2017) as Mrs. Badmus
- Your Fada! (2017) as Bolanle
- A Little White Lie (2017) as Maggie
- A Time To Heal (2017) as Mrs. Lawson
- Lonely Heart (2013) as Mildred
- Plane Crash (2008) as Loveth
- Sisters Love (2008) as Agnes
- Risky Affair (2004) as Judith
- Faces Of Beauty (2004) as Cathy snr
- Love And Pride (2004)
- Moment Of Confession (2004)
- My Blood (2004)
- Schemers : Bad Babes (2004) as Augusta
- St Micheal (2004)
- Ingrates (2004) as Florence
- Love (2003)
- When God Says Yes (2003) as Eunice
- Emergency Wedding (2003) as Comfort
- Jealous Lover (2003)
- Blind Justice (2002)
- Power of love (2002) as Cynthia
- Christian Marriage (2002)
- Submission (2002)

== Discography ==
- Akwaugo (2024)
- Ezi Oyi (2024)
- A.S.A (2023)
- Onulu Ube (2022)
- Olisa (2022)
- Doh Shirt (2021)
- Golibe (2021)
- Brown Sugar (2021)
- No Be Lie (2021)
- You and I (2021)
- Fantasy (2021)
- Lullaby (2021)
- Ifunanya (2021)
- Peace (2021)

== See also ==
- List of Nigerian actors
