= Gold Diggin =

2014 Nigerian romantic drama

- Directed by: Rukky Sanda
- Produced by: Rukky Sanda
- Starring: Rukky Sanda; Alex Ekubo; Yvonne Nelson; Venita Akpofure
- Release date: 3 January 2014
- Country: Nigeria
- Language: English

Gold Diggin is a 2014 Nigerian romantic drama film written, produced and directed by Rukky Sanda. It stars Yvonne Nelson, Rukky Sanda, Alex Ekubo, Venita Akpofure and IK Ogbonna. The film was generally panned by critics for having no real purpose or direction; as of September 2014, it is the lowest rated film on Nollywood Reinvented.

== Cast ==
- Yvonne Nelson as Zara
- Rukky Sanda as Annabella
- Alex Ekubo as Chris
- Venita Akpofure as Karen
- IK Ogbonna as Ik
- Archibong Sam as Tex
- Kehinde Omisore as Juliet
- Chinyere Nwabueze as Ik's Mother
- David McKenzie as Anna's Father
- Daniel Lloyd as Andre
- Tana Adelana
- Dammy Krane
- Abbey Chile Abuede
- Denrele Edun

== Release ==
It premiered at The Palms, Lekki on 3 January 2014. It was released on IROKOtv on February 13, 2014.

== Reception ==
The film was widely panned by film critics. It received a 4% rating on Nollywood Reinvented, the lowest rated film on the website, with a description that it was very predictable, lacked any purpose whatsoever, and was not worth making. The site did however state that Alex Ekubo's acting was the only positive side to the film.

YNaija titled its review "Rukky Sanda’s Gold Diggin makes all the wrong moves," and explained that the first half of the film was just an "extended music video" with no direction and was a complete disconnect from the rest of the film. It concluded that Rukky Sanda showed some promise with Keeping My Man, but Gold Diggin was ten steps backward.

Paulinus Okodugha of TalkofNaija titled its very extensive review as "Rukky Sanda's New Movie, Gold Digging Makes History! Rated As Nollywood's Worst Movie Ever!"

Kemi Filani's review concluded that the film was a complete waste of time.

Noble Igwe of 360Nobs.com advised that "the film should be showed in schools as an example of what NOT to do."

== See also ==
- List of Nigerian films of 2013
