= Dinner at My Place =

2022 Nigerian romantic comedy drama by Kevin Luther Apaa

- Directed by: Kevin Luther Apaa
- Written by: Kevin Apaa
- Screenplay by: Kevin Apaa
- Produced by: Chiamaka Ebochue
- Starring: Timini Egbuson; Bisola Aiyeola; Sophie Alakija
- Production company: Duku Pictures
- Distributed by: FilmOne Entertainment
- Release date: 28 January 2022
- Running time: 105 minutes
- Countries: Nigeria; United States
- Language: English

Dinner at My Place is a 2022 Nigerian romantic comedy drama written and directed by Kevin Apaa. The film stars Timini Egbuson, Bisola Aiyeola and Sophie Alakija in the lead roles. The film had its theatrical release on 28 January 2022 and opened to positive reviews from critics.

== Synopsis ==
The film is based on a Nigerian-American man, Nonso, who is planning to propose to his girlfriend over dinner. He has already planned to gift the gold ring, which was worth $22000, to his girlfriend, and it originally belonged to his beloved mother, as his deceased mother left that ring for him in her memory. But to his surprise, things become worse as far as his intentions were concerned when his ex-girlfriend (Bisola Aiyeola) spoils the fun by entering the picture and showing up uninvited.

== Cast ==
- Timini Egbuson as Nonso
- Bisola Aiyeola as Bisi / Nonso's ex-girlfriend
- Sophie Alakija as Chioma / Nonso's girlfriend
- Uche Montana as Cynthia
- Oluyemi Solade as Doctor Ayo
- Chales Etubiebi as Jay
- Debby Felix as Sandra
- Michael Sanni as Uber driver
- Gabriel Ameh as car salesman
- Juliet Jackson as nurse
- Ruth Okereafor as hotel receptionist
- Nene Nwoko as Nonso's mom
- Namisi Govin Emma as Nonso’s brother

== Production ==
Filmmaker Kevin Apaa revealed that he initially narrated the story suitable for a short film and made the short film with a duration of 11 minutes with the same title. It was released in 2019 and opened to positive reviews. The short film garnered critical acclaim winning eight awards, and was also screened in film festivals in Uthe SA and Uthe K. The positive reception to the short film encouraged Apaa to come up with a lengthy feature film by maintaining the same title. He and his crew members developed the script as a romantic drama film. The cast members who were roped in for the feature film had not previously appeared in the short film. The film was entirely shot in Lagos.
