= List of Nigerian Yoruba actors =

The following is a list of Nigerian actors of Yoruba descent.

== Actors ==
- Femi Adebayo
- Odunlade Adekola
- Jide Kosoko
- Adebayo Salami
- Taiwo Hassan

== Actresses ==
- Ronke Ojo
- Mercy Aigbe
- Toyin Abraham
- Funke Akindele
- Iyabo Ojo
- Dayo Amusa
- Liz Anjorin
- Fathia Balogun
- Toyin Abraham
- Bukky Wright
- Foluke Daramola-Salako
