= Picture Perfect (2016 film) =

2017 Nigerian Movie

- Directed by: Tope Alake
- Written by: Biodun Stephen
- Produced by: Biodun Stephen
- Starring: Mary Njoku; Bisola Aiyeola; Bolanle Ninalowo
- Release date: 2 April 2016
- Running time: 133 minutes
- Country: Nigeria
- Languages: English; Yoruba

Picture Perfect is a 2016 Nigerian romantic drama film directed by Tope Alake. It was produced by Biodun Stephen, and had Mary Njoku, Bisola Aiyeola, Bolanle Ninalowo in lead roles.

== Cast ==
- Mary Njoku as Kumbi
- Bisola Aiyeola as Kiksy
- Bolanle Ninalowo as Jobe
- Ronke Ojo as
- Queen Salawa as Client
- Samuel Asa'ah as Stan
- Seun Toheeb Bamgbelu as Rosco
- Lucky Jerese as Police
- Banke Bakare as Kumbi's Staff
- Yemi Rufus as Jigga
- Biodun Stephen as Sulia
- Seyi Akinde as Bus Conductor
- David Uzoma Aboy as Tout

== Reception ==
Isabella Akinseye, for The Vanguard in her review applauded the minimal yet insightful delivery of the cast members, particularly Ninalowo role as "Jobe", who was noted to have utilized the required energy to bring his character to life. Bisola Aiyeola was also listed as having transitioned into acting from her personality in Big Brother Naija perfectly. Ronke Ojo and Mary Njoku was also commended for having decent performances. The humor from the acting and story was also stated as a high point in the film, which ensured the entertainment value was on a high. However, the lack of sufficient and appropriate subtitles was identified as miss. Additionally, the editing and pacing was also indicated as not being professionally done.

It got a 64% rating on Nollywood Reinvented, who emphasized the versatility of Ninalowo in interpreting diverse roles in films. I summarized its review by expounding that the entertainment utility gotten from watching the film was what made it so special. In a review by talkafricanmovies, the film was "recommended", however the screenplay and aspects of the plots was questioned as being unrealistic in the real world. The acting of the main cast was praised as being talented and showcasing a different aspect of the actors.

Chidumga Izuzu for Pulse titled its review Tope Alake's "Picture Perfect" lives up to its title, while commending various facets of the film. Ife Olujuyigbe for True Nollywood Stories gave it a 60% rating while admitting the exemplary acting of Bolanle Ninalowo, the performance of Mary Njoku, was observed as not being ethnically appropriate, but modestly believable. The inclusion of Bisola Aiyeola as "Kiksy" was described as "nearly pointless", due to lack of individual character buildup about her life activities in the film. However, she was stated to have rescued the lapses with her impeccable acting. The character formulation of "Jobe" was elucidated as having a persona that demonstrates that even area boys/societal miscreants can still seek consent without making sexual advances and not take advantage of persons by having a high level of discipline. The pacing and some sub-plots were criticized as not being well done.

=== Accolades ===
The drama got five nominations at the 2017 Best of Nollywood Awards, including the category for the best actor in a lead role, best supporting actress, best use of Nigerian food in a film, best costume and best makeup.

Complete list of awards
| Year | Award | Category | Recipient(s) | Result | Ref. |
|---|---|---|---|---|---|
| 2017 | Best of Nollywood Awards | Best Actor in a Lead role –English | Bolanle Ninalowo | Won | |
| 2017 | Best of Nollywood Awards | Best Supporting Actress –English | Bisola Aiyeola | Nominated | |
| 2017 | Best of Nollywood Awards | Best Use of Nigerian Costume in a Movie | Picture Perfect | Nominated | |
| 2017 | Best of Nollywood Awards | Best Use of Make up in a Movie | Picture Perfect | Nominated | |
| 2017 | Best of Nollywood Awards | Best Use of Nigerian Food in a Movie | Picture Perfect | Won | |
