= Emmanuel Ikubese =

Nigerian actor, film maker, former model (born 1988)

- Born: Emmanuel Ifeanyi Ikubese; 12 August 1988 (age 38); Nigeria
- Education: United States International University
- Occupations: Actor; Filmmaker
- Years active: 2014-present

Emmanuel Ifeanyi Ikubese (born 12 August 1988) is a Nigerian actor, filmmaker and former model who won the SilverBird male Pageant for Mr. Nigeria in 2014. In 2015, he won the Peace Personality of the Year at the Peace Achievers Awards and in 2016 won the City People Movie Award for Most Promising Actor of the Year (English) at the City People Entertainment Awards. Ikubese, in 2017 was appointed United Nations Millennium Development Goals Ambassador.

== Early life and education ==
Ikubese is from Delta state in Nigeria, a geographical area occupied by the minority tribes in Nigeria as well as the Igbo people. Ikubuese obtained his First School Leaving Certificate and West African Senior School Certificate from local learning institutions within Delta state. In bid to obtain a university degree, he migrated to Kenya where he applied to United States International University Africa in Nairobi to study International Relations and eventually got accepted and obtained a B.Sc. degree upon completion of his course duration.

== Career ==
Ikubese began his career as a professional model in his university’s campus and eventually was crowned Mr. Nigeria as well finishing as first Runner-up at the Mr. World male pageant. Ikubuese after his successful run as a model, ventured into the Nigerian movie industry which is known most commonly as Nollywood and gained significant recognition after he secured a role in the MTV Tv series titled Shuga where he played the role of a character named Femi.

Ikubese made his directorial debut in 2019 with a Tv series titled Kyaddala which is a Ugandan word meaning “its real” when translated to the English language.

== Awards ==
Ikubese won the City People Movie Award for Most Promising Actor of the Year (English) at the City People Entertainment Awards.

Ikubese won the Peace Personality of the Year at the Peace Achievers Awards.

== Personal life ==
In 2019, Ikubese got engaged to Nigerian beautician Anita Adetoye. Ikubese in an interview with The Punch media press listed playing basketball, playing soccer and cooking as his hobbies.

== Selected filmography and Tv series ==
- Shuga (2012-2019) as Femi
- Fifty (2015) as Sammy
- Ojukokoro (2016) as Accountant
- Run (2017)
- My Flatmates (2017-) as Sammy
- Lagos Landing (2018) as Emeka
- Shagayas and Clarks (2018 TV Series) as Lanre Shagayas
- Kyaddala (2019 TV Series) as Jeff
- Deeds (2020)
- Marrying a Campbell (2021) as Efosa Uwaifo
- A Simple Lie (2021 film) as Azeem
- Meeting Funmi's Parents (2024) as Jimoh
