= Biodun Stephen =

Nigerian film director, writer and producer

Biodun Stephen Oladigbo
- Born: Biodun Stephen; Nigeria
- Education: Obafemi Awolowo University; London Film Academy
- Occupations: Filmmaker and radio presenter
- Years active: 2014–present

Biodun Stephen is a Nigerian film director, writer and producer, specializing in romantic drama and comedy films. She has been noted for getting inspiration for the title of her films, from the main character names as depicted in the film with Tiwa's Baggage, Ovy's Voice, Ehi's Bitters and Sobi's Mystic as notable examples.

== Personal life and education ==
Biodun Stephen is married. She is an alumna of Obafemi Awolowo University, where she studied philosophy. After-which, she underwent practical film production training at London Film Academy.

== Career ==
Biodun Stephen began her film-making career in 2014 with the release of The Visit. The film was praised for its minimal yet insightful cast, story and originality. It received two nominations at the 2016 Africa Magic Viewers Choice Awards in Lagos. During an interview with Tribune on various facets of her career, she recalled that acting was her "first love", but didn't have a breakthrough in it hence her decision to improve by attaining new skills abroad. She describes the provision of a platform to communicate with the world as her motivation for delving into film-making. In 2017, Stephen film, Picture Perfect received five nominations, and won two awards at the 2017 Best of Nollywood Awards, for categories best actor in a lead role (Bolanle Ninalowo) and best use of food in a film. She also won best director award at the 2016 Maya Awards (Africa). Speaking to Guardian on the origin of her love stories, Stephen stated "I draw inspiration from my experiences, my pains, my joys, sad moments in my life and in the lives of people around me". For her directorial role in Tiwa's Baggage, she was nominated for best director at 2018 City People Movie Awards. In August 2018, her film Seven and Half Dates was recommended by Guardian as a film to see in the weekend. In an interview with Nigerian Tribune, Stephen recalled that being nominated for AMVCA has been her most accomplished moment, and provided her with the confidence to continue film-making. She describes Emem Isong and Mary Njoku as individuals within the film sector that inspires her. Her artistry in having some form of titular characters has been highlighted by film critics.

Aside film-making, Stephen is also a radio personality, where she anchors a weekend show titled Whispers.

=== Filmography ===
Year	Film	Credited as			Notes
Year	Film	Director	Producer	Writer	Notes
2015	The Visit	No	Yes	No	Got 2 nominations at 2016 Africa Magic Viewers Choice Awards.
2016	Picture Perfect	No	Yes	Yes	Won 2 awards at 2017 Best of Nollywood Awards.
2016	Happy Ending	No	No	Yes	Starred Lilian Afegbai and Chika Ike
2017	Glimpse	Yes	Yes	Yes	Starred Bisola Aiyeola and Okey Uzoeshi.
2017	Tiwa's Baggage	Yes	Yes	Yes	Got nominated for director of the year at 2018 City People Movie Awards.
2017	Sobi's Mystic	Yes	No	Yes	
2017	Ovy's Voice	No	Yes	Yes	Starred Mofe Duncan, Shaffy Bello, Bisola Aiyeola and Uche Ogbodo
2017	Tough Love	Yes	Yes	No	Starred Bolaji Ogunmola, Joshua Richard
2018	Seven and Half Dates	Yes	No	No	Screenplay by Joy Isi Bewaji and produced by Toyin Abraham. Starred Mercy Johnson, Ali Nuhu and Jim Iyke.
2018	All Shades of Wrong	Yes	No	Yes	Starred Femi Jacobs and Bimbo Ademoye
2018	The Ghost and the Tout	Yes	No	No	Produced by Toyin Abraham
2018	Ehi's Bitters	Yes	Yes	Yes	Starred Fathia Balogun and Deyemi Okanlawon
2018	Last Days	Yes	No	No	Starred Susan Peters, Vivian Metchie, Bimbo Ademoye and Funsho Adeolu
2019	Looking For Baami	Yes	Yes	Yes	Starred Bimbo Ademoye Femi Jacobs
2019	Joba	Yes	Yes	Yes	Played the role of Deaconess Frances
2021	Breaded Life	Yes	Yes	Yes	
2021	Progressive Tailors Club	Yes	No	No	Produced by Niyi Akinmolayan
2022	Aki and Pawpaw	Yes	No	No	
2023	Sista	Yes	Yes	Yes	
2023	Different Strokes	Yes	No	No	
2023	Big Love	Yes	No	Yes	
2024	Muri & Ko	Yes	No	Yes	

== Awards and nominations ==
Year	Award	Category as	Recipient	Result	Ref
2022	Africa Magic Viewers' Choice Awards	Best Writer	Introducing the Kujus	Won	
2022	Africa Magic Viewers' Choice Awards	Best Movie West Africa	Breaded Life	Nominated	
