= Princess Peters =

Nigerian singer, songwriter and actress (born 1986)

Princess Peters Osayomwanbor
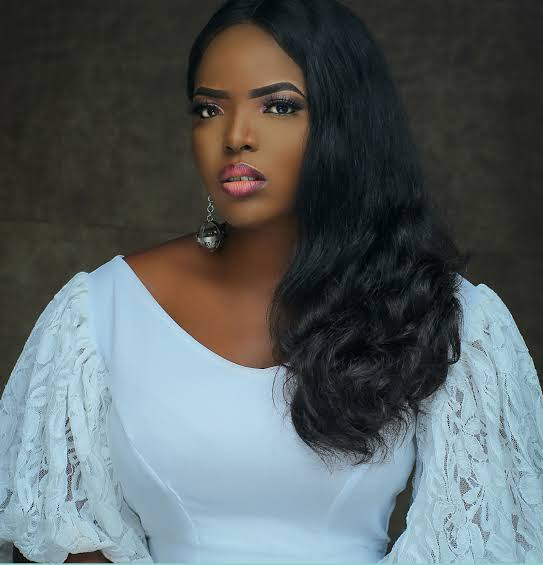
- Peters in 2020

Background information
- Born: 1 October 1986 (age 39); Edo State, Nigeria
- Genres: gospel, contemporary gospel, worship
- Occupations: Singer, songwriter, actress, producer
- Instrument: Vocals
- Years active: 2004–present
- Label: Lightworld Productions
- Website: princesspeters.com

Princess Osayomwanbor Peters better known by her stage name Princess Peters is a Nigerian gospel singer, songwriter, recording and performing artist, actress, film producer, and philanthropist. She started her musical career at a very young age and launched professionally into music with a debut album in 2007 under Lighthworld Productions.

== Life, education and career ==
Peters was born in Benin City, Edo state, Nigeria. She is the 8th child in a family consisting of ten children. Princess had her NCE in Biology and Integrated Science in 2006 at College of Education Benin, now Tayo Akpata University, and Benson Idahosa University, to pursue a degree in Mass Communication.

=== Music career ===
Princess Peters started singing in the children choir of her local church where she worshipped then with her parents. She professionally started her musical career with a debut album "Kpomwen Ijesu" in 2007 under Lighthworld Productions followed by ERHUN in 2011. She has since then released hit singles and albums including, Urhuese, Ose, Ogboviosa amongst others.

Princess has won and gotten several awards nominations including Maranatha Awards USA alongside other top Nigerian gospel musicians including Mercy Chinwo, Steve Crown, Judikay, Frank Edwards.

=== Acting career ===
Peters started acting in her church drama group at the age of 8 and acted in her first movie in 2004. Peters has featured in movies like; Girls are Not Smiling, About Tomorrow, Home in Exile. She has also produced movies like Destiny Gate; Singles Clinik; Edehi.

== Philanthropy ==
Peters is the founder of Lifted Hands Initiative and Princess Peters Foundation where she carries out her humanitarian work to empower the needy in the society. She launched a program "widows rejoice" in 2016 to provide startup business funds to support widows in Benin, Edo State, Nigeria.

== Awards and recognition ==
| Year | Event | Award | Nominated work | Result | Ref |
|---|---|---|---|---|---|
| 2020 | Nigeria Charisma Award | Rokkie of the year | Herself | Won | |
| 2020 | Maranatha Awards USA | Best Collaboration Song 2020 | Herself | Nominated | |
| 2020 | Maranatha Awards USA | Best Inspirational Worship Leader | Herself | Nominated | |
| 2020 | Maranatha Awards USA | Masterpiece Gospel Music Video | Herself | Nominated | |
| 2016 | Best Of Nollywood Awards | Most promising actress of the year | Herself | Nominated | |

== Album ==
- Urhuese (2019)
- Aigbovbiosa (2018)
- Erhun (2011)

== Discography ==
| Sn | Single | Year released |
|---|---|---|
| 1 | Ijesu | 2007 |
| 2 | Erhun | 2008 |
| 3 | Testimony | 2017 |
| 4 | Aigbobiosa | 2018 |
| 5 | Urhuese | 2019 |
| 6 | Oghogho | 2020 |
| 7 | Ose | 2020 |
| 8 | Omeleya | 2020 |

== Selected filmography ==
- What's Within (2014)
- Destiny Gate
- Home in Exile
- Girls Are Not Smiling (2017) as Shaffy
- Free Man (2022)
- Dirty Sunday (2022) as Doctor Uchechi
- About Tomorrow
- Adesuwa
- ATM
- Desperate Love
- Singles Clinik
