= Sikiratu Sindodo =

Nigerian actress (born 1976)

- Born: Tayo Odueke; 21 February 1976 (age 50); Ijebu Ode, Ogun State
- Citizenship: Nigeria
- Education: University of Ibadan
- Occupation: Actress
- Known for: Sikiratu Sindodo
- Children: Naomi Suleiman

Tayo Odueke // (born 21 February 1976), professionally known as Sikiratu Sindodo is a Nigerian actress and producer.

== Early life and education ==
Born on 21 February 1976 in Ijebu Ode, Ogun State. Odueke attended Mainland Preparatory Nursery and Primary School in Surulere, Lagos State before she later proceeded to the Methodist Girls High School, Yaba, Lagos. She obtained a Diploma in Theatre Arts from the University of Ibadan.

== Career ==
Odueke featured in her first movie titled Hired Assassin. The movie Sikiratu Sindodo brought her into the limelight for her character role in the movie. In 2013, she was nominated for Best Lead Actress (Indigenous) at the Zulu African Film Academy Awards.

== Filmography ==
- Hired Assassin
- Sikiratu Sindodo
- Itu (2007)
- Omo mi (2006) as Derinsola
- Itan (2008)
- Etan (2007)
- Aye olorogun (2007) as Tutu
- Imado (2005)
- Khadijat
- Ero mi
- Ogo Mushin
- Looking for Baami (2019) as Officer 2
