= Diary of a Lagos Girl =

2016 Nigerian Romantic Comedy film

- Directed by: Jumoke Olatunde
- Produced by: Nike Erinle
- Starring: Dolapo Oni; OC Ukeje; Alexx Ekubo; Liz Benson; Linda Ejiofor; Paul Adams; Adunni Ade
- Production company: Parables Entertainment
- Release date: 2016
- Country: Nigeria
- Language: English

Diary of a Lagos Girl is a 2016 Nollywood film. The film tells a story of a Lagos girl searching for Mr. Right – a man with everything going for him.

== Cast ==
- Alexx Ekubo as Ife
- Linda Ejiofor
- Dolapo Oni as Bim
- O.C. Ukeje as Timi
- Adunni Ade
- Paul Adams
- Liz Benson
- Ariyike Owolagba
