= Nkechi Blessing Sunday =

Lagos based Nigerian film actor (born 1989)

- Born: Nkechi Blessing Sunday; 14 February 1989 (age 37)
- Citizenship: Nigerian
- Education: Olu Abiodun Nursery and Primary school Barachel Model College
- Alma mater: Lagos State University; Houdegbe North American University
- Occupation: Actress
- Years active: 2008–present
- Known for: Kafila omo ibadan (2012) omoege lekki (2015); The Ghost and the Tout (2018); Fate of Alakada (2020)
- Notable work: NBS Foundation; Nkechi films production
- Spouse: Single

Nkechi Blessing Sunday // (born 14 February 1989) is an America-based Nigerian actress, film producer, film director, and screenwriter, born and raised in Surulere, Lagos State. She produced her first movie, Omoge Lekki in 2015, starring herself, alongside Yinka Quadri. In 2016, Omoge Lekki won MAYA Awards and she was nominated for Revelation of the Year at Best of Nollywood Awards.

She also serves as the director and chief executive officer of Nkechi films production, and NBS Foundation.

== Early life ==
Nkechi Blessing Sunday is from one of the communities in the 17 local government areas in Abia, a State in the Southeast region of Nigeria. She had her primary education at Olu Abiodun Nursery and Primary school, Lagos and her secondary education at Barachel Model College, Lagos. She did a six-month diploma in theatre arts at the Lagos State University, and studied International Relations at Houdegbe North American University.

In 2008, after she graduated from Lagos State University, her friend "Kemi Korede" discovered Nkechi passion for acting and featured her in her movie "Omo Bewaji". Omo Bewaji became a minor break for her career and led to her meeting with Emeka Duru, who offered her a supporting role in Emem Isong movie; Through The Fire & Entanglement in 2009.

She rose to prominence in 2012, with a lead role on Kafila Omo Ibadan, after her meeting with the producer, Temitope Bali in South Africa, who offered her the role on Kafila Omo Ibadan. On 1 February 2017, The Nigeria Carnival USA, unveiled her as one of its ambassadors at the second edition of the yearly Nigeria music, cultural and comedy event in the United States of America. In 2018, she played the role "Dora" in the ghost film The Ghost and the Tout, which also landed her an award at the 2018 City People Movie Award for Most Promising Actress of the Year. In 2020, Nkechi Blessing co-hosted the 2020 edition of the African Entertainment Awards USA with Seun Sean Jimoh. Same year, she was in the cast of Fate of Alakada as the character of Bisi. She starred with a lead role on Tanwa Savage, The Cleanser, Omo Emi, and Ise Ori, and a supporting role on Breaded Life, and Olori Amolegbe. She is a brand ambassador to Folasade Omotoyinbo’s poshglow skincare.

== Personal life ==
Divorce rate is so high because people are ready for weddings, not marriage… Ya all waiting for me to post my wedding pictures before you believe I am married…LMAO! I NBS wants marriage and not a wedding ain’t ready to make my relationship your entertainment

— Nkechi Blessing

On 10 June 2021, Nkechi Blessing, confirmed her marriage between her, and the Ekiti politician, Falegan Opeyemi David, after she shared photos from their wedding on his birthday via her Instagram Story. On 23 September 2021, she lost her mother Gloria Obasi Sunday, while on the verge of launching her premium movies in Lagos biggest theatre. Blessing caused a stir online when she distributed sex toys as souvenirs to all the guests attending the one-year ceremony commemorating her mother’s death anniversary in September 2022.

On 6 April 2022, Nkechi Blessing posted on her Instagram handle that she had ended her 10-month-old marital relationship with Falegan Opeyemi David.

== Filmography ==
List of filmographies by Nkechi Blessing Sunday.

Year	Film	Role	Notes
2008	Omo Bewaji		Drama
2009	Through The Fire & Entanglement		Drama
2012	Kafila Omo Ibadan		Drama
2015	Omoge Lekki	Oluchi	Drama
2016	Fiditi	Chioma	Comedy
2017	Alakada Reloaded		Comedy film
2017	Yanga	Niniola	Drama
2017	Asiko-Time	Nkechi	Drama
2018	The Ghost and the Tout	Dora	Ghost
2018	Judasi	Ojooluwa	Drama
2018	Unsane	Esther	Drama
2018	Anniversary	Bose	Drama
2018	Olori Amolegbe	Iyalode Ladies	Drama
2018	Soulmate	Azeezat	Drama
2018	Jadesola	Mofe	Drama
2018	Fatherhood		Drama
2018	Aye Sokunkun		Drama
2018	Imoran Advice		Drama
2018	Ebiti		Drama
2018	Broken Soul	Tunrayo	Drama
2018	Orogun Aladie	Chioma	Drama
2018	Lekki Guyz	Joy	Drama
2018	Alagbawi 1 & 2	Detective Ola	Drama
2018	Aje	Himan	Drama
2018	Ile Wa	Kate	Drama
2018	Duro	Nurse Tope	Drama
2018	Dokita Miracle	Cynthia	Drama
2018	Alaamu	Judith	Drama
2019	Ise Ori		Drama
2019	Akwa Ndu	Ihuoma	Drama
2019	Wound	Rosemary	Drama
2019	Plastic Girls	Bolu	Drama
2019	Agidi Okan	Tunmise	Drama
2019	Olopa Olorun	Joke	Drama
2019	Babeje	Fadekemi	Drama
2019	Broken Crown	Sayo	Drama
2019	Hostel Babes		Drama
2019	Akanda	Derayo	Drama
2019	Omo Emi	Funmi	Drama
2020	Fate of Alakada	Bisi	Action Comedy
2021	Tanwa Savage	Ngozi	Comedy-Drama
2021	The Cleanser		Thriller
2021	Breaded Life	Risky Baby	Dramedy
2021	Amerah	Amerah	Drama
2022	City Hustlers	Ramulta	Comedy
2023	Ada Omo Daddy	Ndidi	Drama / Thriller

=== Produced ===
Year	Film	Role
2015	Omoege Lekki	Producer
2018	Judasi	Producer
2018	Unsane	Producer
2021	Amerah	Producer

== Awards and nominations ==
Year	Event	Prize	Recipient	Result
2016	Best of Nollywood Awards	Revelation of the Year (female)	Herself	Nominated
2018	City People Movie Award	Fastest Rising Actress of the Year (Female)	Herself	Nominated
2018	City People Movie Award	Most Promising Actress of the Year (Yoruba)	Herself	Nominated
2018	City People Movie Award	Best Actress of the Year (Yoruba)	Herself	Nominated
2018	City People Movie Award	Most Promising Actress of the Year (Yoruba)	Herself	Won
2019	City People Movie Award	Best Supporting Actress of the Year (Yoruba)	Herself	Nominated
2020	Best of Nollywood Awards	Best Actress in a Lead role –Yoruba	Herself	Nominated
