= A Young Time Ago =

2023 Nigerian film

- Directed by: Lord Tanner
- Written by: Lord Tanner
- Produced by: Atinuke Akinde; Joy Grant Ekong
- Starring: Daniel Etim Effiong; Timini Egbuson; Sophie Alakija; Wale Ojo; Rachael Oniga
- Distributed by: Amazon Prime
- Release date: 1 September 2023
- Running time: 1hr 51mins
- Country: Nigeria
- Language: English

A Young Time Ago is a Nigerian film produced in 2023, directed by Lord Tanner, and distributed by Amazon Prime.

== Plot summary ==
Tayo works for Uncle Gee. One day, he tells one of his workers about Ukara, who will be visiting the house. Ukara enters the house and engages Tayo, who after some time, narrates his love journey.

The story portrays Tayo, a young boy in his university days. He is a close associate and friend of Kemi, a girl he likes who does not return his feelings. Magic, a famous singer and senator's son arrives in the school, and Kemi falls in love with him. She follows Magic to a party where she is raped.

She confines herself in her room for days until she eventually tells Tayo about the assault. Tayo gets revenge for her by using Magic's sister. When Magic wants to escape, he gets shot. Hearing the news, Kemi's father instructs her to flee the country while Tayo gets arrested for Magic's murder.

== Cast ==
- Timini Egbuson
- Wale Ojo
- Daniel Etim-Effiong
- Sophie Alakija
- Mofehintola Jebutu
- Sandra Okunzuwa
- Tolu Osaile

== Production and reception ==
The film was shot at the University of Ibadan. Upon release, it received mixed reviews. Shola-Adido Oladotun, while reviewing for Premium Times gave the film a score of 5 out of 10, citing that "the film may not have offered a fresh perspective on telling stories, but it will take you back to the years when Mo' Hits Records singers dominated the airwaves". It was recognised by Vanguard, and in a review, it was scored 6 out of 10, with Enitan Abdultawab citing that "it can stand the tests of memory and time in its space".

== See also ==
- List of Nigerian films
