= 13 Letters (film) =

Nigerian Romantic Movie

- Directed by: Kayode Peters
- Written by: Pearl Agwu
- Produced by: Pearl Agwu
- Starring: Kunle Remi, BBNaija's Teddy A, Mofe Duncan, Bimbo Ademoye, Bolanle Ninolowo, Amanda Dara.
- Release dates: 1 October 2021 (Lagos, Nigeria)
- Country: Nigeria
- Language: Yoruba language

13 Letters is a 2019 Nigerian romantic drama film written by Pearl Agwu and directed by Kayode Peters. It stars the Gulder Ultimate Search winner, Kunle Remi, BBNaija's Teddy A, Mofe Duncan, Bimbo Ademoye, Bolanle Ninolowo, Amanda Dara, Adedamola Adewole Ariyike Dimples and Chris Iheuwa.

== Premiere ==
On the 1st of October 2021, 13 Letters made its debut at GidiBoxOffice, a movie-streaming platform.

== Synopsis ==
The story revolves around a playboy who suffers a major damage when his ex-girlfriends expressed their grievances on social media.

== Cast ==
- Bimbo Ademoye
- Temidayo Adenibuyan as Teddy A
- Adedamola Adewale as Adedamola Adewale
- Rosie Afuwape
- Opeyemi Opal Apampa
- Bolanle Babalola
- Queency Ehimwenma Bazuaye
- April Chidinma
- Amanda Dara
- Mofe Duncan
- Ife Eninla
- Chris Iheuwa
- Bolanle Ninalowo
- Ariyike Owolagba
- Kunle Remi as Akinola "Owoblow" Owolabi
- Omotunde Sogunle as Mo Sogunle
- Korede Lawal as Young Akin
