= Daniel Ademinokan =

Nigerian-born director, producer and screenwriter

- Born: Daniel Oritsebawo Ademinokan
- Citizenship: Nigerian, American
- Education: Digital Film Academy, New York Film Academy, University of Ibadan
- Occupations: Film & TV Director; Screenwriter; Film Producer
- Years active: 1990s-Present
- Organization(s): Index Two Studios LLC, Léon Global Media LLC
- Notable work: Gone (2021); MTV Shuga Naija 4 (2019); Black Friday (2010); Ghetto Dreamz - The DaGrin Story (2010); No Jersey, No Match (2010)
- Spouses: Doris Simeon (m. 2008; div. 2011) Stella Damasus (m. 2014; div. 2020) Tope Oshin (m. 2023)
- Website: https://www.danielademinokan.com/

Daniel Ademinokan is a Nigerian-born film and TV director, screenwriter, and film producer. He has worked as a screenwriter and in postproduction in Nollywood since the late 1990s but he rose to prominence in 2010 as director of the feature film Black Friday. He is the CEO and co-founder of Index Two Studios LLC which he co-owned with ex-wife Stella Damasus. After their divorce in 2020, Ademinokan launched Leon Global Media, LLC with the release of the feature film Gone. He currently lives in Houston, Texas.

== Education ==
Ademinokan earned a Bachelor's degree in Computer Science in Nigeria. After that, he moved to the United States where he studied filmmaking at the Digital Film Academy in New York. He went on to study Digital Cinematography at the New York Film Academy.

== Career ==
Ademinokan started as a scriptwriter in Nollywood and wrote several screenplays that became hits in the 1990s. He became known with his movie Black Friday which was nominated for five different awards at the Africa Movie Academy Awards. His 2010 short film No Jersey, No Match starred Gabriel Afolayan and won the Best Short Film award at the Abuja International Film Festival. It was later screened at the Hoboken Film Festival in New Jersey.

== Personal life ==
Ademinokan married Doris Simeon in 2008 and divorced her in 2011. He and Doris have a son born in 2008. Ademinokan married Stella Damasus in 2012, and they divorced in 2020.

== Filmography ==
- Gone (2021)
- Shuga (TV series)
- Here (Short 2019/II)
- Between (2018/III)
- The Other Wife (2018)
- The Search (2012/V)
- Ghetto Dreamz: The Dagrin Story (documentary 2011)
- Unwanted Guest (2011)
- Eti Keta (2011)
- Bursting Out (2010)
- Too Much (2010/I)
- Modúpé Tèmi (Video 2008)
- In the Eyes of My Husband (video 2007)
- In the Eyes of My Husband 2 (video 2007)
- In the Eyes of My Husband 3 (video 2007)
- Onitemi (video 2007)
- The Love Doctor (video 2007)
- Omo jayejaye (video 2006)
- Black Friday (2010)
