= Muri & Ko =

2024 Nigerian film

- Directed by: Biodun Stephen
- Written by: Biodun Stephen; Ayomide Olatunbosun
- Story by: Biodun Stephen
- Starring: Kunle Remi; Bisola Aiyeola; Femi Jacobs; Charles Okocha
- Cinematography: Ladipo Abiola
- Distributed by: FilmOne Distributions
- Release date: 12 June 2024
- Country: Nigeria
- Languages: English; Yoruba; Igbo; Nigeria Pidgin

Muri & Ko is a 2024 Nigerian film directed by Biodun Stephen and produced in collaboration with FilmOne distribution. The film features Kunle Remi, Bukunmi Adeaga-Ilori, Bisola Aiyeola, Bucci Franklin, Femi Jacobs, Charles Okocha and child actor Fiyinfoluwa Asenuga. It was released in Nigerian cinemas on 12 June 2024. Kunle Remi also made his musical debut by performing one of the songs from the film, "Muri Picka".

== Synopsis ==
Muri, who is known in the neighbourhood to be a petty thief, soon found a big opportunity to steal a luxury car at a mall. He seized the opportunity and stole the car, unaware that a child, Cole, was inside. As soon as he discovered the child, he sought a way to get rid of the boy by abandoning him on the road. Muri took pity on the boy when hoodlums pounced on him and decided to embark on the journey with him.

A 10 million naira bounty was placed on Cole's head for anyone with reliable information that could help the police locate him. Unaware of this, Muri continued his journey, trying to evade the police, who were searching for both the car and the boy. Muri and Cole became very close, forming a strong "Muri & Ko" bond.

== Selected cast ==
- Kunle Remi as Muri
- Bisola Aiyeola as Dinma
- Fiyinfoluwa Asenuga as Cole
- Gloria Anozie as Dinma's mother
- Femi Jacobs as Detective Offor
- Emem Ufot as Officer Moses
- Charles Okocha as Chukwudi
- Bukunmi Adeaga-Ilori (Kiekie) as Shalewa
- Peace Adegoke as Lady at pharmacy
- Adediwura Adesegha as Semiat
- Glory Baba as Canteen staff
- Bro Bouche as Raski
- Kanyin Eros as Pharmacist
- Bucci Franklin as Banji
- Biodun Stephen
- Abiola Kareem

== Release and recognition ==
Following the release of Muri & Ko in cinemas on 12 June 2024, it grossed over 100 million naira at the box office. The film was later released on Amazon Prime Video in August 2024.
