= Ovy's Voice =

Film

- Directed by: Dimeji Ajibola
- Written by: Biodun Stephen
- Produced by: Biodun Stephen
- Starring: Bisola Aiyeola; Uche Ogbodo; Shaffy Bello
- Production company: ShutterSpeed Projects
- Release date: March 24, 2017
- Country: Nigeria

Ovy's Voice is a 2017 Nigerian romantic drama film, written and produced by Biodun Stephen. It was directed by Dimeji Ajibola. The film narrates a story of a supposedly dumb makeup artist, who became the love interest of the son of her client, and how upbringing influenced the direction of her future relationships. Upon release, the film received mostly positive reviews.

== Cast ==
- Bisola Aiyeola as Ovy
- Uche Ogbodo as YV
- Shaffy Bello as Mrs. G
- Mofe Duncan as Anaan
- Casmir Chibuike as Ovy's Dad
- Vivian Otoriotubu as Young Ovy

== Reception ==
Talk African Movies which usually "recommends" or "ejects" films, recommended the film and applauded the audio, interpretation of roles by main acts and provision of subtitles on screen during the film. It has a 3.5 rating on Nollywood Reinvented, who praised the writing, lead performance especially for Ovy, soundtrack (rendition of "Awww" by Di'Ja) and the story. It summarized its review by stating "Ovy’s Voice is a very sweet and simple watch that captivates you in a ‘bed of roses’ kind of way and then proceeds to wreak havoc on your emotions when you least expect it". tns.ng in its review described the change of theme from a film showing that physically challenged persons could still have a normal life, into something on human abuse was a well executed "distraction", that might have made the theme richer if avoided. It praised the little number of actors and characters used in the film, as it simplified the delivery of the message. The roles from the main cast were also applauded with Ovy's character noted to be "believable and fantastic". The use of songs from Johnny Drille, Di'Ja and Gabriel Afolayan were also seen as high points in the film, as they were selectively chosen to increase the connection with the performance. It concluded its review by stating "Ovy’s Voice is a brilliant attempt, and it doesn’t leap over loops to be. It is a fine blend of a good story, great acting and smooth directing".
