= Looking for Baami =

2019 Nollywood film

- Directed by: Biodun Stephen
- Written by: Biodun Stephen
- Produced by: Biodun Stephen
- Starring: Femi Jacobs; Bimbo Ademoye; Biodun Stephen; Tayo Odueke
- Release date: 2019
- Running time: 1 hr 26 min
- Country: Nigeria
- Language: English

Looking for Baami is a 2019 Nigerian drama film written and directed by Biodun Stephen. The film stars Femi Jacobs, Bimbo Ademoye, Akinde Seyi in the lead roles.

== Cast ==
- Femi Jacobs as Femi Osinowo
- Bimbo Ademoye as Ajinde Ife (AJ)
- Biodun Stephen as Abebi
- Tayo Odueke as Officer 2
- Temitayo Awodoyin as Young Femi
- Karen Ajimobi as Chikodi
- Babatola Awelewa as Young Abebi
- Seyi Akinde as Driver
- Bolaji Ogunmola as Sharon
- Deola Ayoade as Khadijah
- Sarah Ebegbe as Receptionist
- Constance Owoyomi as Chiamaka
