= Introducing the Kujus =

2020 Nigerian comedy drama film

- Promotional poster
- Directed by: Biodun Stephen
- Screenplay by: Donald Tombia; Mannie Oiseomaye
- Produced by: Winifred Okpapi; Bisola Aiyeola
- Starring: Bisola Aiyeola; Timini Egbuson; Ronke Odusanya; Femi Jacobs
- Production company: Temple Motion Pictures
- Release date: 27 November 2020
- Running time: 125 minutes
- Country: Nigeria
- Languages: English; Yoruba

Introducing the Kujus is a 2020 Nigerian comedy-drama film directed by Biodun Stephen and produced by Winifred Okpapi. The film stars Bisola Aiyeola, who co-produced the film. It also features Timini Egbuson, Femi Jacobs, Bimbo Ademoye, Sophie Alakija and Mimi Onalaja and is set in Badagry. The movie focuses on one young woman's love for her family, and how this love reunites her family and ends old feuds. It was released on 27 November 2020. In its opening week, the film grossed ₦10 million. Introducing the Kujus is suitable for family viewing but parental guidance is advised.

== Plot ==
Introducing the Kujus tells the story of five Nigerian siblings who are at crossroads. They do not want to return to their hometown in Badagry for the five-year remembrance of their mother's death. Mausi Kuju, with the help of Maugbe Kuju, orchestrates a plan to bring their other siblings together. For the plan to succeed, she must trick her siblings, but the volatile nature of their relationship means she does not know how exactly it'll go.

== Cast ==
- Bisola Aiyeola as Mausi
- Timini Egbuson as Maugbe
- Femi Jacobs as Mautin
- Kunle Remi as Mauyan
- Ronke Odusanya as Maupe
- Bimbo Ademoye as Ebi
- MC Lively as Barry Wonder
- Sophie Alakija as Lily
- Folaremi Agunbiade as Chuks
- Mimi Onalaja as Pamela
- Chris Iheuwa as Otunba
- Temitope Ogunleye as Tombra
- Ayomide Ogunleye as Bibiana

== Awards and nominations ==
Year	Award	Category	Recipient	Result	Ref
2022	Africa Magic Viewers' Choice Awards	Best Actor in A Drama	Femi Jacobs	Nominated	
2022	Africa Magic Viewers' Choice Awards	Best Actor in A Drama	Timini Egbuson	Nominated	
2022	Africa Magic Viewers' Choice Awards	Best Art Director	Adeoye Adetunji	Nominated	
2022	Africa Magic Viewers' Choice Awards	Best Writer	Manie Oiseomaye, Donald Tombia and Biodun Stephen	Won	
