= Ariyike Owolagba =

Nigerian TV host and actress

- Born: Ariyike Dorcas Owolagba; 5 November; Yaba, Lagos State
- Other names: Ariyiike dimples; Media’s sweetheart
- Education: B.A Mass Communication
- Alma mater: Lagos State University
- Occupations: actress; TV host
- Years active: 2015–present
- Employers: SuperSport; TVC News (former); Red TV (former)
- Television: SuperSports SuperPicks; TVC Entertainment Splash; Red TV Red Hot Topics

Ariyike Dorcas Owolagba (born 5 November), also known as Ariyiike Dimples, is a Nigerian actress, TV host and former record executive.

== Background and education ==
She was born in Yaba, Lagos. She is from Kabba LGA in Kogi State. Out of four children, she is the only girl and the third in birth order. Ariyike completed her secondary education at Starfield College and obtained a Bachelor of Arts degree in Mass communication from Lagos State University. She further obtained a certification in Broadcasting from the National Broadcast Academy, Lagos.

== Career ==
She was listed amongst the YNaija Power List of 2020. She has been the host of Urban Kitchen show - a culinary show that showcases the diversity of Nigerian dishes - since 2021. The show has had comedian Alibaba, Juliet Ibrahim and DJ Neptune as guests, amongst other celebrities. She is a producer and presenter on SuperSport’s SuperPicks show, the former host and producer of TVC’s Entertainment Splash show. She was a panelist on the Red Hot Topics on United Bank for Africa (UBA)’s Red TV. She was also the former director of operations at Aristokrat Records.

She is an event host and fashion blogger, and also podcaster on her personal podcast #GirlTalkWithAriyiike.

She began acting in 2015 and featured in the nollywood movie 13 letters. She was also cast in Aníkúlápó, Backup Wife and Diary of a Lagos Girl. She also featured in StarTimes’s Okrika series - a comedy series that talks about dealing in second hand clothes.

Owolagba is a Pepsi brand ambassador in Nigeria. She was also announced as the brand ambassador of Friska Tea. She covered the 2019 edition of Exquisite Magazine, and was nominated for the Female TV presenter (terrestrial and online TV) of the year 2017 at the ELOY Awards.

== Filmography ==
Year	Title	Role
2016	Entreat	
2016	Diary of a Lagos Girl	Folake
2017	Love In The Wrong Places	Kathy
2018	Back Up Wife	Joan
2018	Lisa's Code	
2019	AMCOP: Rekindle	
2021	13 Letters (film)	(as Herself)
2021	After Dark	Shewa
2021	Fluke	Sade
2022	Aníkúlápó	Omowon
2022	Alaga	

=== Others ===
- Diary of a Lagos Virgin as Seyi
- Ogere the Movie
- Val’s Gift as Valerie
- Lower Berth as Mabel
- Distraction as Judith

== Personal life ==
She suffered the loss of her father in November 2022.
