= Uche Ogbodo =

Nigerian film actress and producer (born 1986)

- Born: Uche Ogbodo; 17 May 1986 (age 40); Enugu State, Nigeria
- Education: University of Nigeria (Banking & Finance)
- Occupation: Actress
- Spouse: Bobby Maris ( Married 2023 - present)
- Parent(s): Godwin Ogbodo and Ada Luisa Ogbodo

Uche Ogbodo // (born 17 May 1986) is a Nigerian Actress, producer, and red carpet host. She came into the limelight in 2006 with her debut movie Another Bondage and has since then acted in other movies like Four Sisters, Players, Your Holiness, Your Last Action, Honor My Will, The Laptop, and Royal Palace.

== Early life ==
Born in Enugu State, in the southeastern region of Nigeria, to Godwin Ogbodo, and Ada Luisa Ogbodo as the second child in a family of five. Ogbodo spent most of her teenage years in her hometown. She is a graduate of Banking and finance from the University of Nigeria.

== Career ==
Ogbodo's journey to Nollywood began following the decision of her father to register her with the Actors Guild of Nigeria in Enugu State, and she subsequently acted in other movies such as Be My Val, Family Romance, Festac Town, Forces of Nature, Four Sisters. In 2013, she won Spotless Actress of the year from Godfrey Okoye University and in 2015, she won the Fashion Icon of The Year Award, Best Supporting Actress at the City People Entertainment Awards for her role in “Mummy Why", and in 2018 Outstanding Nollywood Actress at the Icon 2018 Awards.

In 2011, she was assaulted by Enugu-based movie marketers, Amaco Brothers because she supposedly delayed movie production and made them lose money with imminent ban threat and arrest but after investigations by the Actor Guilds of Nigeria, the judgment was placed in her favor.

== Personal life ==
A popular Nigerian article blog "whoiswriter" claims that Uche Ogbodo currently has two kids. She gave birth to her first child, Mildred Chinagorom, in 2014 and her second child, Chimsimdiri Lumina Ugwoegbu on June 9, 2021. She married her second daughter's father Bobby Maris traditionally in her hometown in Enugu state on January 5, 2023. Uche Ogbodo welcomed a baby boy with Bobby Maris in October 2023.

== Filmography ==
Year	Film	Character	Notes
2005	Total Disgrace	Agatha	Ekenna Udo Igwe
2005	Royal Palace		Andy Amenechi
2005	Only Love	Chika	Andy Amenechi
2006	Another Bondage	janet	Saint Obi, Ebere Okaro
	Simple Baby	Uju	Tchidi Chikere
	Light Out		Nonso Ekene Okonkwo
	Over Heat		Kalu Anya
	Price Of Fame		Charles Inojie
	Be My Val		MacCollins Chidebe
	Forces of Nature	Charity	Tchidi Chikere
2008	Four Sisters	Jasmine	With Pete Edochie
	Gamblers		
	Test My Heart		With Muna Obiekwe, Pete Edochie
2011	Family Disaster		With Zack Orji, Helder Dokumbo, Chidi Mokeme
2015	Living With The Ghost	Oluchi	With Micheal Ezuruonye, Oge Okoye
2016	Mummy Why	Tessy	With Peter Edochie, Ernest Obi, Chinwe Owoh,
	Cruze	Lizzy	With Jim Iyke, Mary Njoku, Eucharia Anunobi
2017	Stolen Vow	Koko	With Joyce Kalu, Bryan Emmannuel
2017	The Laptop	Nicky	With Muna Obiekwe, MC Moris Directed By Yul Edochie
2017	Ovy's Voice	YV	With Mofe Duncan, Shafy Bello, Bisola Aiyeola
2017	Power of Beauty	Uche	
2017	Price of Fame		
2017	Raging Passion	Mabel	
2017	Royal Palace		
2017	Sacrifice for Marriage		
2017	Simple Baby	Uju	
2017	Spirit of Twins		
2017	Turning Point		
2017	Yankee Girls	Louisa	
2017	Only Love	Chika	
2018	Girl Child		
2018	Love in Sight	Uji	
2018	Broken Pieces		
2019	Men and Ego	Eleora	
2020	Cheta		With Kenneth Okolie, Franka Brown
2020	UnderCover	Winifred	With Pere Egbi, Emem Ufot, Malice Uti Nwachukwu, Chinoso Arubayi
2020	Malice	Isioma	
2020	Honour My Will		
2020	Zikora	Susan	
2020	Love Child	Ohuoma	
2020	Not Your Husband	Alice	
2021	Pushback	Nkasi	
2022	A Pierced Heart	Ekwuitos	With Somadina Adinma, Ifeoma Obinwa
2023	Truth or Dare		with Michael Animaku, Caz Chidiebere

Year	Award ceremony	Prize	Result	Ref
2015	2015 Fashion Icon Awards	Fashion Icon of The Year	Won	
