= Deza the Great =

Nigerian actor (born 1980)

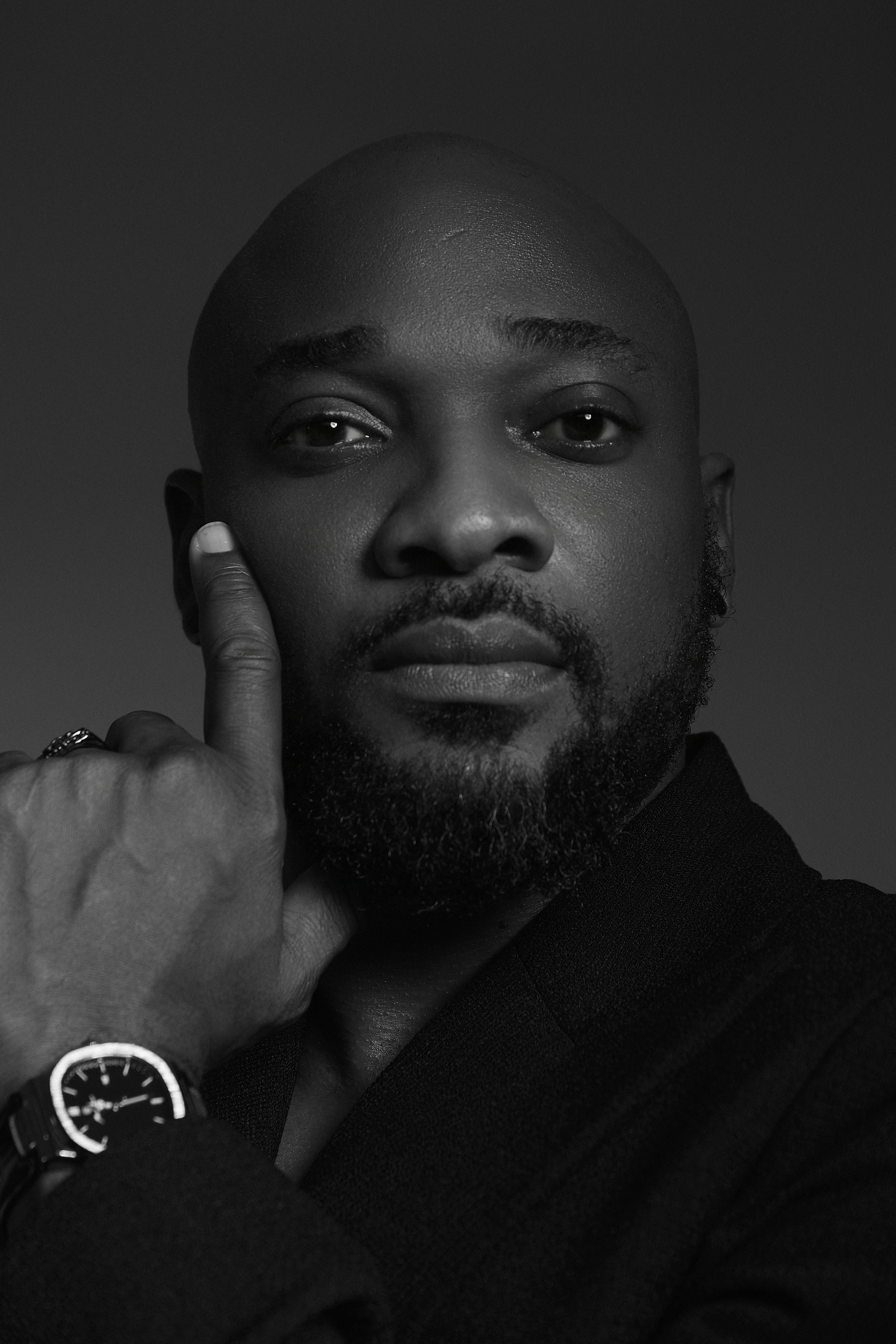
- Born: Adekanla Aderinola Desalu; November 7, 1980 (age 45); Lagos, Nigeria
- Education: University of Lagos
- Occupations: Actor; filmmaker; banker
- Years active: 2005-present

Adekanla Aderinola Desalu (born 7 November 1980) professionally known as Deza the Great is a Nigerian actor, filmmaker and former banker. Desalu's works include Big Love (2023), Hell & Fury (2024), Two Captains and Unusual Arrangements (2023).

== Early life and education ==
Desalu was born in Lagos, Lagos State on 7 November 1980. He graduated from University of Lagos with a bachelor's degree in actuarial science and hold an MBA in artificial intelligence from Nexford University.

== Career ==
Desalu worked at Glo in 2005 as the commercial roaming manager and later moved to Sterling Bank (then Equatorial Trust Bank) in 2008, where he also worked as a regional client engagement officer. He left the bank in September 2023 to focus on filmmaking.

Desalu made his debut appearance in 2010 with the TV series, Catwalq where he played the character, Barry. Desalu has appeared in 150 movies and has produced 7 movies.

== Filmography ==
- Big Love (2023)
- Wrong Choice (2023)
- Love in Lagos (2023)
- Cloud 9 (2023)
- Role Play (2022)
- Hell & Fury (2024)
- Two Captains
- Unusual Arrangements (2023)
- Catwalq (2010)
