= Culturati =

Culturati is an annual cultural festival held in Lagos, Nigeria, to commemorate African culture, heritage, and diversity. The event brings together artists, performers, entrepreneurs, and audiences to celebrate African culture.

== History ==
Culturati started as the "Sisi Oge" beauty pageant in 2006, which ran for over a decade and empowered numerous models and cultural ambassadors. The event was rebranded as Culturati to expand its focus beyond pageantry, into African arts, culture, and entrepreneurship. The 18th edition held in December 2024. Culturati is an initiative of Idris Aregbe.

Culturati is organized in collaboration with the Lagos State Ministry of Tourism, Arts, and Culture.

== Honorees ==
The festival has honored individuals who have made significant contributions to African culture, including Helen Prest-Ajayi, Bruce Onobrakpeya, Benson Idonije, Lola Shoneyin, Mudi Africa, Nike Okundaye, Pelu Awofeso, Toyin Lawani, and others. Posthumous recognition has also been given, such as to Levi Ajuonuma.
