= Endurmenntun Háskóla Íslands =

Coordinates: 64.139598°N 21.955787°W

Location
- Dunhagi 7 Reykjavík, IS-107; Iceland

Information
- Established: 1983
- Staff: 17 (administrative)
- Language: Icelandic, English
- Affiliation: University of Iceland
- Website: http://www.endurmenntun.is/

Endurmenntun Háskóla Íslands is a continuing education centre operated by the University of Iceland. Unlike its parent institution, it does not receive public funding and it entirely funded by school fees. It offers a variety of career enhancement- and personal enrichment courses in fields such as finance, administration, information technology, education, tourism, language and culture. These range from single courses to full degree programmes. Teaching is provided by University of Iceland staff, local industry specialists, and guests from abroad.
