= Chinyere Nwabueze =

Nigerian actress and movie producer

- Born: Chinyere Nwabueze; Ohafia, Abia State, Nigeria
- Education: University Of Port Harcourt
- Occupation: Actress

Chinyere Nwabueze is a Nollywood actress and film producer from Ohafia in Abia State, Nigeria. Some of her films include Breaking Cord, In Her Shoes, Class of 21, Spider, When the King Decides, and Ezeabata the Kidnapper.

She won the TERRACOTTA's best supporting Actress award forSpider and was nominated Africa's best actress at the 2010 ZAFFA awards in London.

== Selected filmography ==
- Breaking Cord
- Class of 21
- Spider
- When the King Decide
- Ezeabata the kidnapper
- Brother's Love
- Adaogwa in Love
- Comfort My Love
- In her shoes (2013) as Mama Peju
- Gold Diggin (2014) as Ik's Mother
- Mission to love (2015) as Ogonna
- Tamed (2016)
- Black Day (2018) as Mercy's Mother
- Arinze (2019)
- 5G Network (2020) as Rebecca
- Amaka Must Go (2021) as Mama Sopuruchi
- Aghugho Anyaukwu (2022) as Ugomma
- Ogwuma (2023) as Sisi
- Olisaemeka (2023) as Egodi
- Ichaka (2024) as Mama
