= Sandra Aguebor =

Nigerian mechanic

- Born: 1970s Benin City
- Education: Pan-Atlantic University
- Occupation: Mechanic
- Known for: Being the first female Nigerian mechanic
- Notable work: She is also the founder of the Lady Mechanic Initiative

Sandra Aguebor or Aguebor-Ekperuoh is a Nigerian mechanic. She is reported as being the first woman mechanic in Nigeria. She is also the founder of the Lady Mechanic Initiative, which trains sexually abused and underprivileged women to become mechanics and fend for themselves.

== Early life and education ==
Sandra Aguebor was born in 1970s in Benin, Nigeria to the late Mr. & Mrs. R.A Aguebor. she began her educational journey at Ivbiotor Primary School. Subsequently, she attended St. Maria Goretti Grammar School in Benin, followed by Benin Technical College, where she honed her technical skills. Her educational pursuits culminated in graduating from Auchi Polytechnic in Edo State. Additionally, she holds a degree from Goethe Institute, a German school based in Lagos State.

== Career ==
After graduation, she embarked on a career that included working for Edo Line and Nigeria Railway Corporation. Following the launch of her auto repair garage, despite facing setbacks like the demolition of her workshop, Sandra persevered. Transitioning to a mobile workshop, she provided on-the-spot emergency vehicle service along Lagos freeways and eventually established two more garages in the city. Today, she dedicates her time rescuing them from the streets and fostering their development by imparting valuable skills, particularly in the automotive industry.

Speaking on gender inequality and male privilege, Aguebor explained that she had to put in five times more effort more than men to be taken seriously, however, she decried being labelled "lady mechanic" by her colleagues instead of just "mechanic". In 2015, she was the subject of a film, produced by Al Jazeera, titled Sandra Aguebor: The Lady Mechanic. The film won awards at New York Film Festival.

Aguebor was nominated for the COWLSO award, an initiative established by Lagos State government in 1974 to honour individuals that have contributed to the "social welfare of the state". She was presented the inspirational woman of the year award by Dolapo Osinbajo and Governor Akinwunmi Ambode, who noted that she used her "skills and talent to make positive impact to the society in an area dominated by men". She was also given a national merit award by federal government of Nigeria.

Speaking to Vanguard at the graduation ceremony of 50 female mechanics, Aguebor disclosed that she has trained over 700 mechanics so far. She is married with children.
