= Sophie Alakija =

Nigerian actress (born 1993)

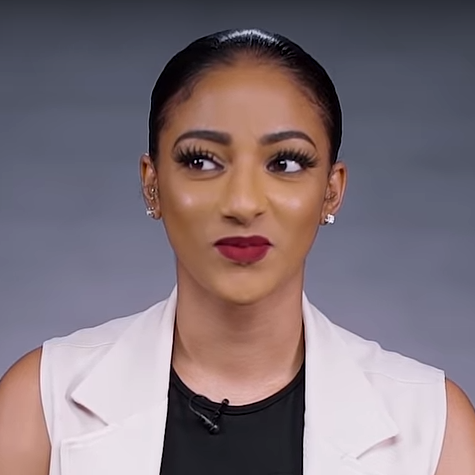
- Alakija in 2019
- Born: Sophie Rammal; 8 February 1993 (age 33); Lagos, Nigeria
- Occupation: Actress
- Years active: 2010–present
- Spouse: Wale Alakija (m. 2016; div. 2020)
- Children: 2

Sophie Alakija (born Sophie Rammal; 8 February 1993) is a Nigerian actress and model who appears in Nollywood films.

== Early life ==
Alakija was born into an Islamic family in Lagos State, southwestern Nigeria and grew up in Surulere. Her father is Nigerian with Lebanese roots while her mother is Nigerian, specifically of Efik origin from Cross River State.

== Career ==
Alakija featured in the Holla at your boy music video of Nigerian music superstar Wizkid as the lead dancer in 2010.

She has appeared in several films, including Drawing Strands, Getting over him, and Small Chops. In 2017, she appeared in the TV series Scandals, which is a collaboration between Ghana and Nigeria. In 2019, she appeared in the TV series Halita and then in the TV series Assistant Madams. She also starred in Timini Egbuson's Muslim Wife in 2020 and My Village People in 2021.

== Personal life ==
On 27 March 2016, she married Wale Alakija in a low-key Islamic traditional wedding. They had two children during their four-year marriage, which ended in 2020.

She is also known for wearing her natural hair on set.

== Filmography ==
Year	Film	Role	Genre	Ref.
2017	A Time To Heal	Nkechi	Drama	
2017	In Our Trap	Margaret	Drama	
2017	Ordinary People	Nkoli	Drama	
2017	The Silver Spoon	Ella	Drama	
2017	A Case of Free Will	Moda Bodija	Comedy	
2017	7 Days in a Coma	Babe 1	Drama	
2018	Getting Over Him	Stephanie	Comedy, Romance	
2018	Love in a Time of Kekes	Korede	Romance	
2018	Orunsewa	Orunsewa	Romance, Fantasy	
2018	Wo.Men Are Scum	Aijay	Romance, Drama	
2018	Make It or Break It	Kiki	Drama	
2019	The Intern	Sade	Drama	
2019	Uncommon Events	Uju	Comedy	
2019	Rising Above	Ema	Comdedy, Drama	
2019	Venom	Ebiye	Drama	
2019	Drawing Strength	Lami Washik	Drama	
2019	Halita	Actress: Altine	TV series	
2019	Scandals	Actress: Altine	TV series	
2020	Assistant Madams	Actress: Tamara	TV series	
2020	Small Chops	Celine	Drama	
2020	Muddled	Mirabel	Drama	
2020	Karma on Ice (TV series)	Chioma	Action, Drama, Thriller	
2020	Brown Skin Girl	Clarissa	Drama	
2020	A Piece of Me	Demi	Drama, Romance	
2020	Loud: Live Out Ur Dream		Drama, Musical	
2020	Introducing the Kujus	Lily	Comedy	
2021	Gone	Zainab	Drama	
2021	Bouquet and Everything After	Katherine	Comedy, Drama	
2021	My Village People		Comedy	
2021	Gone	Zainab	Movie	
2021	Addiction	Nadia	Comedy, Romance	
2021	Love Tangled	Tina	Romance	
2021	Tough Love (TV series)		Drama	
2021	Manifestation	Funmi	Horror, Thriller	
2021	Isio		Drama	
2022	Dinner at My Place	Chioma Amadi	Romantic comedy drama	
2022	Sub Sahara (TV mini-series)	Sophie Alakija	Family	
2022	Cake	Chalya	Comedy, Romance, Thriller	
2022	Beautiful People		Drama	
2022	House of Money	Tomisin	Thriller	
2022	Treasury	Tina	Drama	
2022	Road to Spotlight	Naomi	Short, Drama	
2023	A Lot Like Love	Actress: Sadiya	Movie	
2023	One Night		Drama	
2023	Maniac		Thriller	
2023	The Kujus Again	Lily	Drama	
2023	A Lot Like Love	Sadiya	Drama, Thriller	
2023	Love Me Less	Maureen	Drama	
2023	Boss Chic	Wunmi	Comedy, Romance	
2023	Grow Together	Farida	Drama	
2023	A Young Time Ago	Older Kemi	Drama	
2023	Love Lies and Lasgidi	Chioma	Romance	
2024	Home & Away		Comedy, Romance	
2024	Goal Diggers (TV series)		Drama	
2024	Crazy about You	Tiffany	Romance	
2024	Before My Ex	Eucharia	Drama, Romance	
2024	Tough Decision			
2024	Being Farouk	Linda	Drama	
2024	Visa on Arrival	Flora	Comedy	
