= Ehi's Bitters =

- Directed by: Biodun Stephen
- Written by: Biodun Stephen
- Produced by: Biodun Stephen
- Starring: Fathia Balogun; Deyemi Okanlawon; Enado Odigie
- Production company: ShutterSpeed Projects
- Release date: 2018
- Running time: 115 minutes
- Country: Nigeria

Ehi's Bitters is a 2018 Nigerian film, written, produced and directed by Biodun Stephen. The story (narrated in a non-linear manner) is centered around the life of a young woman, Ehisoje who is being emotionally and physically abused by her mother, who blames her for her unmarried status, which has limited her prestige as a woman. After several failed relationships, her mother finally settles for a man who sexually abuses Ehisoje, but she doesn't mind as long as she remains married. She renders Ehisoje homeless after she got pregnant for her step-father.

== Cast ==
- Enado Odigie as Ehisoje
- Deyemi Okanlawon as Korede
- Debby Felix as young Ehisoje
- Fathia Williams as Ehisoje's Mother
- Joshua Richard as Eli/Elijah
- Tomiwa Tegbe as young Korede
- Biodun Stephen as Mama Korede
- Peters Ijagbemi as Eloho's Husband
- Banjo Simisola as Zara
- Chidi Okeke as Stanley

== Reception ==
Nollywood Reinvented gave it a 2.5/5 rating and applauded the acting and use of a revised version of "Bia Nulu", a song originally written by Onyeka Onwenu as soundtrack. It also praised the message of the film, in revisiting the unfairness in the patriarchal structure in many Nigerian societies. The film was criticized for being overly long, unprofessional video formulations and excessive prosthetic. True Nollywood Story titled its review Technical Challenges Wear Off Large Chunk Of Brilliance In “Ehis’ Bitters”, But It Still Manages To Remain A Movie That’ll Touch You. In the review, it praised the story, casting and acting but panned the appropriateness of the diction of Fathia Balogun, makeup and cinematography. Speaking about her role in the film, Felix (played Ehisoje) stated that in order to keep her character in the film alive during shooting, she trained her mind to be moody and unhappy throughout the time. She also explained that she wasn't surprised at the positive reviews she got after the release of the film.
