= Ehi (spirit) =

Ehi is the name of a personal spirit in some West African religious beliefs, especially in Edo-State Nigeria and Benin. Ehi means "Genius, Authority, Faith", but it also means "angel" in some Nigerian languages and refers to a spirit possessing a man, similar to a guardian angel. Furthermore, Ehi means "gift" in the Idoma language of Nigeria.

Ehi is a component of a person that remains with the supreme deity Osa. A person's ehi guides them through their life in the agbon, or material world, while interacting with other spirits in the erinmwin, or spirit world. The ehi remains with the person during the day, and returns to report to Osa at night. Ehi is viewed as a cult in parts of western Africa with a "moderated initiative" where many believe that lack of success can be blamed on the Ehi possessing a man. The Ehi is said to be "constantly sacrificed" in gratitude for success or for guidance in difficult times. Bradbury says of it, "Close as a man and his ehi are they are yet thought of as being independent agents and so there is a possibility of conflict between them. Ehi must, therefore, be propritiated in much the same way as other supernatural entities and failure to do this results in trouble.
