= Progressive Tailors Club =

2021 Nigerian political satire film

- Directed by: Biodun Stephen
- Produced by: Niyi Akinmolayan; Victoria Akujobi
- Starring: Beverly Osu; Rachael Oniga; Lizzy Jay; Adedimeji Lateef; Bolaji Ogunmola
- Music by: Tolu Obanro
- Production company: Anthill Studios
- Release date: 29 October 2021
- Country: Nigeria
- Language: English

Progressive Tailors Club, is a 2021 Nigerian political satire film directed by Biodun Stephen and co-produced by Niyi Akinmolayan and Victoria Akujobi. The film stars Beverly Osu, Uzor Arukwe, Funnybone, and Blessing Jessica Obasi with Rachael Oniga, Lizzy Jay, Adedimeji Lateef, and Bolaji Ogunmola in supporting roles.

The film was shot in and around Lagos, Nigeria. It premiered on 29 October 2021.

== Plot ==
Members of the Progressive Tailors Club gather for a meeting to elect their new leader. They made several unlawful comments on that. However, when a longstanding and trusted executive is eliminated for corruption, the choice comes down to the old, the new, and the ridiculous.

== Cast ==
- Beverly Osu as Cynthia
- Uzor Arukwe as Mazi Chibuzor
- Funny bone as Fidelis
- Blessing Jessica Obasi
- Rachel Oniga as Mrs. Edem
- Lizzy Jay as Mummy Lekan
- Adedimeji Lateef as Saheed
- Bolaji Ogunmola as Bisi
- Femi Adebayo as Agbabiaka
- Kolawole Ajeyemi as Alfa
- Adesina Adebayo as Eko
- Alakija Adebayo as Wasiu
- Chika Agwuike as Festus
- Mitchell Amaechi as Emordi
- Imoh Eboh as Agnes
- Ates Brown as Happiness

== Awards and nominations ==
Year	Award	Category	Recipient	Result	Ref
2022	Africa Magic Viewers' Choice Awards	Best Actor in A Comedy	Femi Adebayo	Nominated	
