= Ronke Oshodi Oke =

Nigerian actress

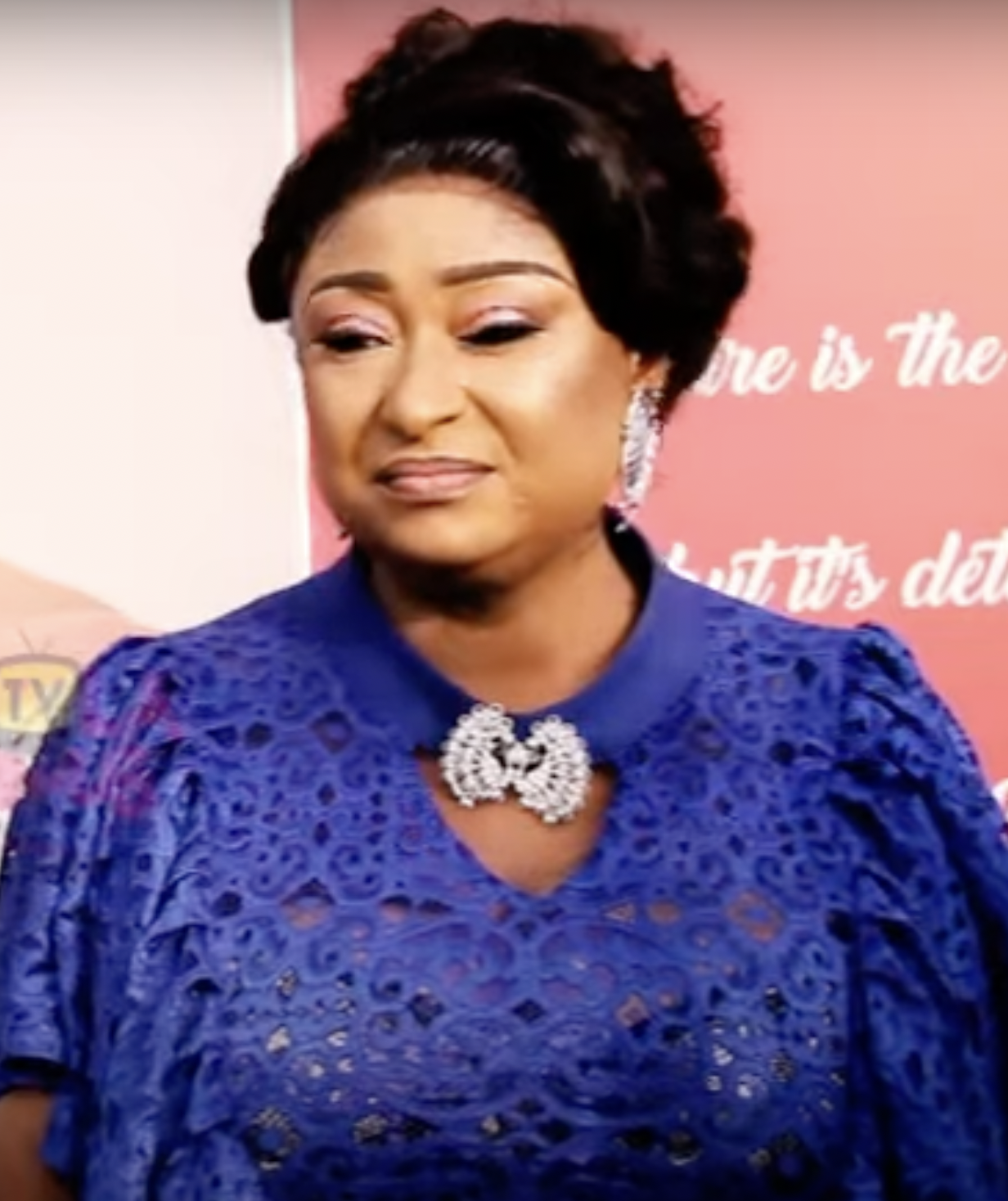
- Born: Ibironke Ojo; 17 July 1974 (age 51); Oworoshonki, Kosofe, Lagos State, Nigeria
- Other name: Ronke Ojo
- Citizenship: Nigerian
- Occupations: actress; producer; director
- Years active: 1998–present
- Notable work: The Eve (2018 film)
- Spouse: Anthony Gbolahan (m. 2009)

Ibironke Ojo-Anthony (born 17 July 1974) professionally known as Ronke Oshodi Oke is a Nigerian film actress, musician, director and producer.

== Early life and career ==
Ibironke Ojo Anthony professionally known as Ronke Oshodi Oke is a native of Ondo State, Nigeria. She was born July 17, 1974 in Oworonshoki, Lagos State Southwestern Nigeria, where she completed her primary and secondary education. She began her acting career with a drama group called Star Parade under the leadership of Fadeyi, a Nigerian actor but became a household name in the year 2000 when she featured in a movie titled Oshodi Oke, from which she got her stage name. Her musical career began in 2014, the same year she launched her debut album which is yet to be released. In 2015, she released a single titled Ori Mi which featured 9ice.

== Personal life ==
Ronke is married and has a son.

== Filmography ==
- Isan Laye
- Eesu
- Agbere Oju
- Return of Jenifa
- Abeke Aleko
- Abeke Eleko 2
- Ajiloda
- Asiri (2002)
- Oshodi Oke (2000)
- Okun Ife 2 (2004) as Producer
- Okun Ife (2004) as Producer
- Aimasiko eda (2006)
- Iyawo asiko (2006)
- Omo Elemosho (2012) as Lolade
- Succubus (2014)
- Tiwa's Baggage (2017) as Aunty
- The Eve (2018 film) as Aunty Beatrice
- Joba (2019) as Ore's mother
- The Ghost and the Tout (2020) as Kafila
- Iju: the story before (2020) as Mrs. Imoni
- Brotherhood (2022) as Aunty Morenike
- Ajosepo (2024)
- American Japa (2024)

== Awards and nominations ==
Year	Award	Category	Result	Ref
2018	Best of Nollywood Awards	Best Actress in a Lead Role - Yoruba	Won	

== See also ==
- List of Nigerian film producers
- List of Nigerian Yoruba actor
