= Bisola Aiyeola =

Nigerian actress (born 1986)

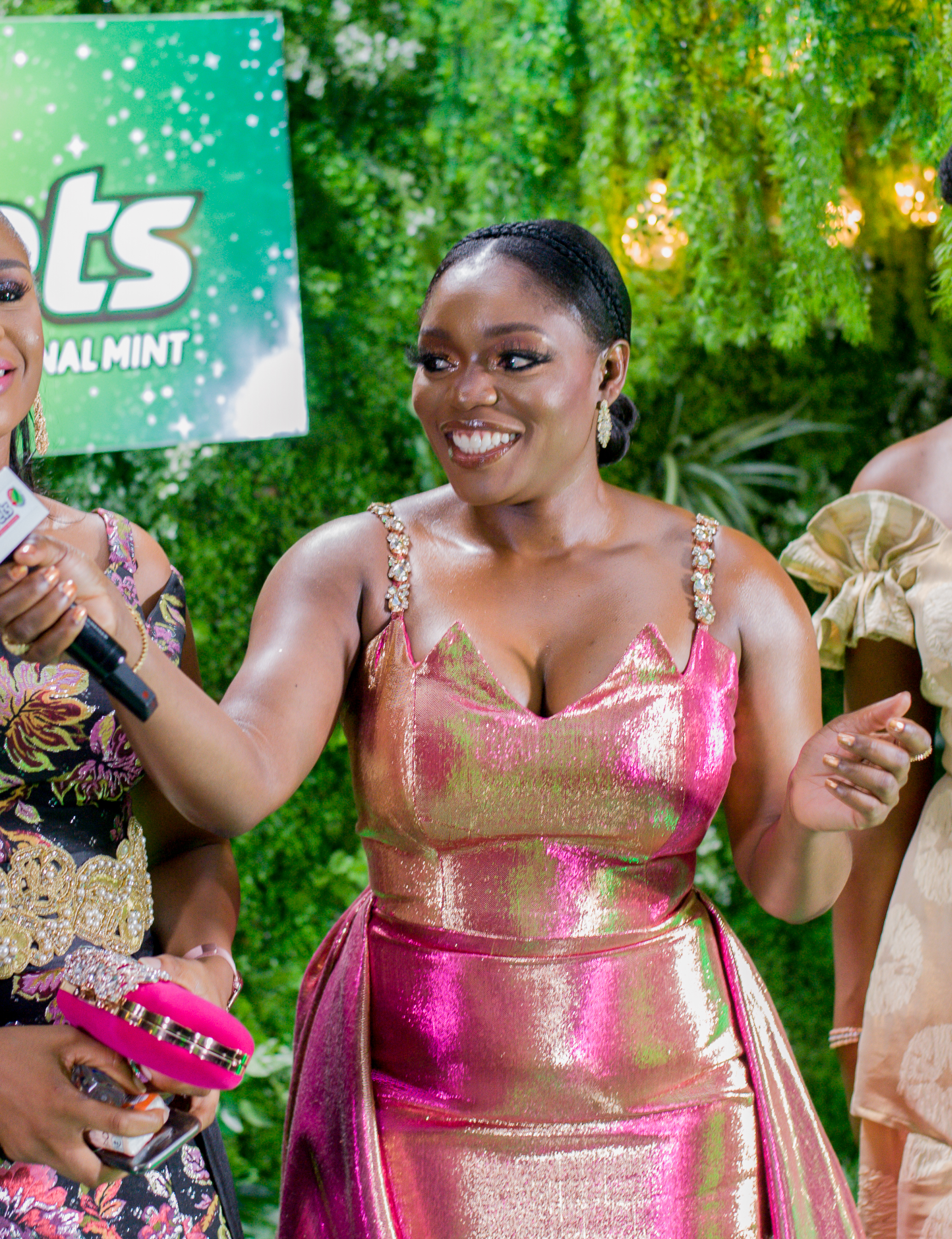
- Bisola at AMVCA 2020
- Born: Abisola Aiyeola; 21 January 1986 (age 40); Nigeria
- Education: National Open University of Nigeria
- Occupation: Actress
- Notable work: Husbands of Lagos
- Children: 1
- Awards: AMVCA Trailblazer Award

Bisola Aiyeola (born 21 January 1986) is a Nigerian actress.

She and her siblings were singlehandedly raised by her mother after her father abandoned them when she was just three years old.

In 2017, Bisola became the first runner up of Big Brother Naija to Michael Efe Ejeba. In 2018, she won the AMVCA Trailblazer Award at the 2018 Africa Magic Viewers' Choice Awards. In 2021, she was one of the investors of Amaze, an app that makes endorsement deals easier for celebrities.

== Education ==
Bisola attended National Open University of Nigeria where she studied business management.

== Career ==
Aiyeola appeared on the 2017 series of Big Brother Naija where she was first runner up. While at BBN, she emerged winner of ONE Campaign reality show which is an international Advocacy Organisation for girl-child education with offices in London, United States, Nigeria and other parts of the world.

After leaving the house, as a singer, Bisola released her single debut Luchia under Temple music.

Bisola was one of the contestants at MTN Project Fame West Africa in 2008 where she came 5th and Iyanya won. From 2011 to 2013, Bisola was a one time TV host of Billboard Nigeria which aired on Silverbird Television. In 2017, Bisola was nominated for City People Movie Award for Revelation of the Year (English) alongside Zainab Balogun, Somkele Iyamah, Seun Ajayi. In 2018, Bisola won the Trail Blazer Award at the AMVCA. She made her debut as a producer on Introducing the Kujus. In 2022, She became the first African to host Family Feud, a reality TV show organized by MTN and Ultima.

Aiyeola was a presenter at the 2023 Africa Magic Viewers' Choice Awards.

In 2023, Bisola Aiyeola launched her skincare company, Brown Girls Magic.

== Selected filmography ==
- Picture Perfect (2016) as Kiksy
- Ovy's Voice (2017) as Ovy
- Skinny Girl in Transit (2015) as Didi
- Gold Statue (2019) as Samira
- The Bling Lagosians (2019) as Kiki Princewill
- Sugar Rush (2019 film) as Sola Sugar
- The Becoming Of Obim (2019) as Zika
- This Lady Called Life (2020) as Aiyetide
- Two Grannies And A Baby (2017) as Rosa
- Payday (2018 film) as Ngozi
- Introducing The Kujus (2020) as Mausi
- Breaded Life (2021) as Aunty Agy
- Dwindle (2021) as Officer Juliet
- Castle and Castle (2021)
- Chasing Rainbow's (2017) as Siki
- Falz experience (2018)
- Something Wicked (2017) as Clarissa
- A Simple Lie (2022) as Boma
- Makate must sell (2019) as Radio Presenter
- Ben Quick (2017) as Dorathy
- Chief daddy (2018) as Chef Simi
- Dinner at My Place (2022) as Bisi
- Let Karma (2019) as Gabriella
- Husbands of Lagos (2015 TV series) as Sikira
- Flawsome (2022 TV series) as Ifeyinwa
- Palava (2022 film) as Imade
- Family Feud Nigeria (2022–present)
- Sista (2022) as Tiwatope
- The Kujus Again (2023)
- Adam Bol (2024) as Madam Joy
- Iwájú (2024) (voice of Happiness)
- Muri & Ko (2024)
- Everybody Loves Jenifa (2024)
- Gingerrr (2025)

== Awards and nominations ==
| Year | Award | Category | Film | Result | Ref |
|---|---|---|---|---|---|
| 2017 | Best of Nollywood Awards | Best Supporting Actress –English | Picture Perfect | Nominated | |
| 2018 | Africa Magic Viewers' Choice Awards | Trail Blazer Award | —N/a | Won | |
| 2020 | Best of Nollywood Awards | Best Actress in a Supporting Role (English) | Sugar Rush | Won | |
| 2020 | Best of Nollywood Awards | Best Actress in a Lead role –English | This Lady Called Life | Nominated | |
| 2022 | Africa Magic Viewers' Choice Awards | Best Actress in A Comedy | Dwindle | Nominated | |
| 2022 | Africa Magic Viewers' Choice Awards | Best Supporting Actress | Sugar Rush | Nominated | |
| 2022 | Africa Magic Viewers' Choice Awards | Best Actress in A Drama | This Lady Called Life | Nominated | |
