= Rukky Sanda =

Nigerian actress (born 1984)

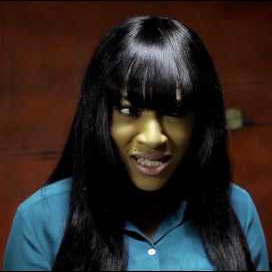
- Rukky Sanda in "What's Within"
- Born: Rukayat Akinsanya; 23 August 1984 (age 42); Lagos State
- Education: Lagos State University
- Occupation: Actress
- Years active: 2004- till present
- Notable work: Gold Diggin
- Relatives: Yinka Adeokun and Bolanle Ninalowo (Cousin)

Rukky Sanda (born 23 August 1984) is a Nigerian actress, film producer, and director.

== Early life and career ==
She was born Rukayat Akinsanya, 23 August 1984 in Lagos State. She began her acting career in 2004 while still a student at Lagos State University, and continued after graduation in 2007.

== Personal life ==
Sanda is the cousin of Nigerian actor and film producer Bolanle Ninalowo.

== Selected filmography ==
- Legal War (2007)
- Campus Love (2007)
- Lethal Woman (2008)
- Obscure Motives (2009)
- Holding Hope (2010) as Chioma
- White Chapel (2011) as Doris
- The Seekers (2011) as Doris
- Lovelorn (2012)
- Miami Heat (2012)
- Keeping my Man (2013) as Zion
- Gold Diggin (2014) as Annabella
- What's Within (2014)
- The Relationship (2018) as Toke

== See also ==
- List of Nigerian actors
