= Bolanle Ninalowo =

Nigerian actor (born 1980)

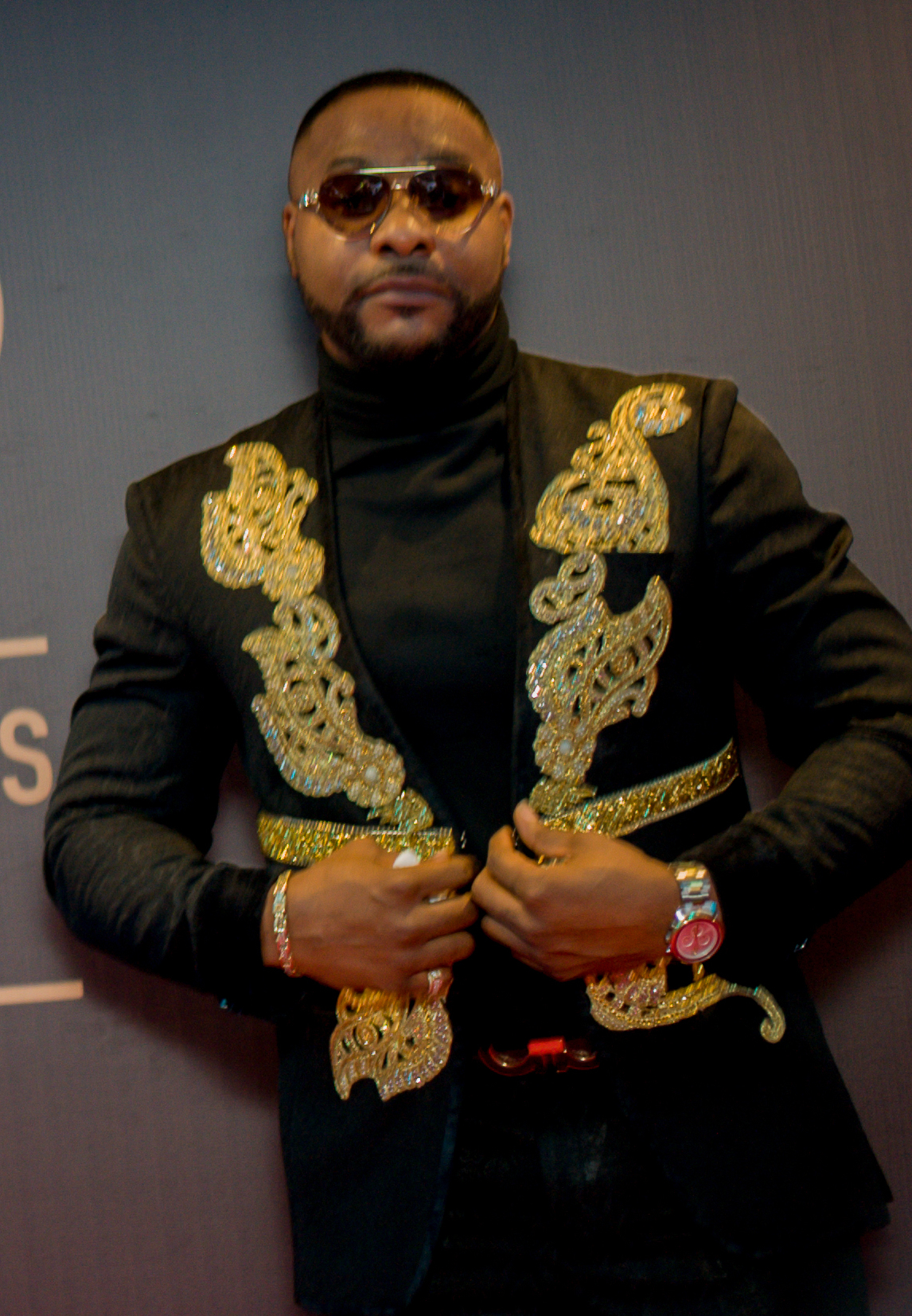
- Bolanle Ninalowo at the 2020 AMVCA
- Born: 7 May 1980 (age 46); Nigeria
- Other name: Nino
- Citizenship: Nigeria
- Education: DeVry University
- Occupation: Actor
- Years active: 2010–present

Bolanle Ninalowo, also known as Nino, (born 7 May 1980) is a Nigerian actor and film producer.

== Career ==
Before Ninalowo's attempt into the Nigerian movie industry, he first worked as an accountant in a bank in the United States of America. Then upon relocating back to Nigeria, he worked with Guaranty Trust Bank. Ninalowo's first attempt into the Nollywood Nigerian movie industry was as a movie producer. He produced his first movie titled Rebirth.

== Personal life ==
Ninalowo has been married before, then separated, and has reconciled with his spouse with whom he has two children, one male and the other female.

He is the cousin of Rukky Sanda, a Nigerian movie producer and actress. Nino converted from Islam to Christianity after he found a remedy to his troubles in the Bible which he says has become his life's manual.

== Selected filmography ==
- What's Within (2014)
- Husbands of Lagos (2015-2017) as Wale
- Just Married (2015) as Tobi
- Road to Yesterday (2015) as Tosin
- Picture Perfect (2016) as Jobe
- Atlas (2017) as Richard
- A fire in the Rain (2017)
- The Intervention (2017) as Tunde da Silver
- 30 Years A Virgin (2017) as Mikky
- Iya iyawo
- The Gateman (2017) as Daniel
- Tiwa's Baggage (2017) as Olly
- When Men Promise (2017) as Alex
- Coming from Insanity (2019) as Rocky
- Akpe: Return of the Beast (2019)
- Men and Ego (2019) as Mark
- Trust Issues (2019) as Andrew
- Alter Date (2019)
- Social Media 101 (2019) as Lanre
- Night Bus To Lagos (2019)
- Ratnik (2020) as Koko
- The Wrecker (2019) as Peter
- LOUD (2020)
- Fate of Alakada (2020) as Femi
- Breaded Life (2021) as Jobe
- Crazy Grannies (2021) as Kayode
- 13 Letters (2021)
- Almajiri (2022) as Gangster
- Obara'M (2022) as Emeka
- Far From Home (2023) as Oga Rambo (TV Series)
- The Bloom Boys (2023) as Dozie Okafor
- Lakatabu (2024)
- Ruthless (2024)
- Someone Like You (2024) as Phils/Felix

== Awards and nominations ==
| Year | Award ceremony | Prize | Result | Ref |
|---|---|---|---|---|
| 2010 | Best of Nollywood Awards | Revelation of the Year | Won | |
| 2017 | City People Movie Award | Best Supporting Actor of the Year - English | Won | |
| 2017 | Best of Nollywood Awards | Best Actor in a Lead role - English | Won | |
| 2018 | Best of Nollywood Awards | Best Actor in a Lead Role - Yoruba | Nominated | |
| 2018 | City People Movie Award | Best Actor of the Year - English | Won | |
