= Bimbo Ademoye =

Nigerian actress (born 1991)

- Ademoye at the 2026 Toronto International Film Festival.
- Born: 4 February 1991 (age 35); Lagos State, Nigeria
- Education: Mayflower School; Covenant University
- Occupation: Actress
- Years active: 2014-present
- Known for: Backup Wife; Sugar Rush; Where Talent Lies
- Awards: 2017 Best of Nollywood Awards (Nominated) 2018 Best of Nollywood Awards (Won); 2019 City People Entertainment Awards (Won) 2023 Africa Magic Viewers Choice Awards (Won)

Bimbo Ademoye (born 4 February 1991), is a Nigerian actress. She won Best Actress in a comedy TV series at the 2023 Africa Magic Viewers' Choice Awards for her role in the film Selina.

== Early life and education ==
Bimbo Ademoye was born on 4 February 1991, in Lagos, Southwestern Nigeria. Bimbo Ademoye and her elder sister Adebike Maryam were raised by their dad after their parents separated when she was just 2 years old.

She obtained her secondary education from Mayflower School and is an alumna of Covenant University, where she studied Business Administration. In an interview with The Punch newspaper, she said she was raised by a single father who supported her chosen profession.

== Career ==
In an interview with The Daily Independent newspaper, Bimbo Ademoye said that her acting career began in 2014 when she was cast in the short film Where Talent Lies. The film received accolades from the Africa International Film Festival. She describes Uduak Isong as her mentor, who assisted her in getting into the industry. In 2015, Ademoye was cast in her first feature film Its About Your Husband, which was also produced by Isong.

In a 2018 compilation by Premium Times newspaper, she was listed as one of five actors who were predicted to have a successful career before the end of the year. In April 2018, she co-featured with Stella Damasus in Gone, which was directed by Daniel Ademinokan. Ademoye described working with Damasus as a motivating moment in her career.

She was nominated for Best Actress in a Comedy/TV series at the Africa Magic Viewers' Choice Awards in 2018, for her role in the film Backup Wife (2017).

At the 2018 City People Movie Awards, she was nominated for Revelation of the Year, Best New Actress and Best Upcoming Actress. Bimbo's role in Backup Wife also earned her a nomination for Best Lead Role at the 2018 Nigeria Entertainment Awards. She has also received two individual nominations at the 2018 Best of Nollywood Awards for her role in Personal Assistant, winning the award for Best Actress in a Supporting Role and getting a nomination for Best Kiss in a Movie.

Ademoye has been described as a celebrity style icon by several media outlets.

== Filmography ==
- Where Talent Lies (2014) as Rachael
- Desperate Housegirls (2015) as Omolola
- This Is It (2016) as Kerry
- It's About Your Husband (2016) Silo Kama
- The Arbitration (2016) as Ebele
- My Wife & I (2017) as Georgina
- The Backup Wife (2017) as Wuraola
- Diary of a Crazy Nigerian Woman (2017) as Lola
- The Inlaws (2017) as ivy
- Cash Daddy (2017) as Sylvia
- Charmed (2018) as Lola Thomas
- Rofia Tailor Loran as Rofia
- Kamsi (2018) as Ije
- Gone (2018)
- Getting Over Him (2018) as Sandy
- Personal Assistant (2018) as Mona
- Girlfriends (2019) as Ivie
- The Family (2019)
- Last Days (2019) as Peace
- My Soulmate (2019) as Nike Adenuga
- Light In The Dark (2019) as Ifeoma
- Looking for Baami (2019) as Ajunde Ife
- Feels Like Heaven (2019)
- Special Package (2019) as Lotta
- Sugar Rush (2019) as Bola Sugar
- Dear Affy (2020) as Toche
- Reach (2020) as Jacquelin
- Nneka the Pretty Serpent (2020) as Ada
- Love is Yellow (2020) as Linda
- Introducing the Kujus (2020) as Ebi
- Creepy Lives Here (2021)
- Checklist (2021) as Efe
- Breaded Life (2021) as Todowede
- Lies in between (2021) as Cleopatra
- Mask (2021) as Sotonye
- 13 Letters (2021)
- Ayinla (2021) as Fali
- Hustle (2021) as Hadiza
- Hide 'N Seek' (2021) as Aishat
- Anikulapo (2022) Arolake
- Boss Down (2022) as Becky
- Head Over Bills (2022) as Cheta
- Selina as Selina
- All That Glitters (2023) as Basira
- Selina's Wedding (2023) as Selina
- Big Love (2023) as Adina
- Next Door Secret (2023) as Sochi
- Jagun Jagun (2023) as Morohunmbo
- The Kujus Again (2023) as Ebi
- Hotel Labamba (2024) as Detective Zizi
- What The Hearts Wants (2024) as Benny
- The Thing About Men (2024) as Oreoluwa
- Thirty to Thirty One (2024) as Genevieve
- Shining Star (2024) as Cara
- House Arrest (2024) as Steph
- Unexpected Places (2024) as Prosper
- Dirty Little Secret (2024)
- Teacher Dorcas (2024) as Dorcas
- Last Straw (2024) as Morenike
- Fame and Fury (2024) as Daberechi
- Love Unplanned (2024) as Adetola
- Ruse (2024) as Shalewa
- Timini (2024) as Lilian
- Reel Love (2025) as Chizaram
- Suky (2025) as Dr. Simisola

== Awards and nominations ==
Year	Event	Category	Result	Ref
2017	Best of Nollywood Awards	Revelation of the Year –female	Nominated	
2018	Best of Nollywood Awards	Best supporting actress	Won	
2018	Best of Nollywood Awards	Best Kiss in a Movie	Nominated	
2019	City People Movie Award	Most Featured Actress In Cinema Movies	Won	
2020	AMVCA	Actress in a Comedy (Movie/TV Series)	Nominated	
2020	Best of Nollywood Awards	Best Actress in a Supporting Role (English)	Won	
2022	Africa Magic Viewers' Choice Awards	Best Actress in A Comedy	Nominated	
2023	Africa Magic Viewers' Choice Awards	Best Actress In A Comedy/TV Series	Won	
2023	Africa Magic Viewers' Choice Awards	Best Actress In A Drama, Movie Or TV Series	Nominated	
2023	Africa Magic Viewers' Choice Awards	Best Online Social Content Creator	Nominated	
