= 2016 Best of Nollywood Awards =

Award ceremony

- Date: 10 December 2016
- Location: El-Dorda Events Center, Abia State
- Country: Nigeria
- Hosted by: Okey Bakassi

The 2016 Best of Nollywood Awards was the 8th edition of the ceremony and took place in Aba, Abia State on 10 December 2016. The event was to be hosted by Okey Bakassi and Mercy Aigbe, with the latter not showing up on the award night. Awards were given in 32 categories, with Adesua Etomi, Beverly Naya, Gabriel Afolayan and Alexx Ekubo amongst the winners.

The nominee list was released in November 2016 by head of jury, Niran Adedokun. Hire a Man and Something Wicked led the nomination list with nine nominations. Eni-Owo and A Soldier's Story followed with seven. The lifetime achievement awards for special contribution to the development of Nollywood was given to Sola Sobowale, Fidelis Duker and Chika Okpala, popularly known as "Chief Zebrudaya" from The Village Masquerade.

== Awards ==
Best Actor in a Lead role (English)	Best Actor in a Lead role (Yoruba)
Alex Ekubo (The First Lady); Wale Ojo (For the wrong reasons); Patrick Leonard (Woeman); Stan Eze (Not Just Married); Enyinna Nwigwe (Hire a Man)	Yomi Fabiyi (Metomi); Femi Adebayo (Gbewiri Meta); Adeniyi Johnson (Lifeline); Muyiwa Ademola (Eni-Owo); Lateef Adedimeji (Yeye Oge)
Best Actor in a Lead role (Hausa)	Best Actor in a Lead role (Igbo)
Ali Nuhu (Gamu nan Dai); Sadiq Dan Sadiq (Mat Da Lados)	Blossom Chukwujekwu (Icheke Oku); Amadi Magnus (Akaraaka)
Best Actress in a Lead role (English)	Best Actress in a Lead role (Yoruba)
Judith Audu (Not just married); Omotu Bissong (Woeman); Ebube Nwagbo (Anniversary); Belinda Effah (Oracle Online); Omoni Oboli (The First Lady); Ireti Doyle (Something Wicked)	Toyin Aimakhu (Metomi); Mercy Aigbe (Victims); Temitope Solaja (Lehin Ikoro); Wumi Toriola (Eni-Owo); Yewande Adegbenro (Yeye Oge); Jumoke Odetola (Binta Ofege)
Best Actress in a Lead role (Hausa)	Best Actress in a Lead role (Igbo)
Jamila Umar (Kasata); Rahama Sadau (Mati Da Lado)	Nichole Banna (Icheke Oku); Adaeze Chiegbu (Akaraaka)
Best Supporting Actor (English)	Best Supporting Actress (English)
Gabriel Afolayan (Something Wicked); Rotimi Salami (Just Not Married); Seun Akindele (Black Val); Daniel K Daniel (A Soldier's Story); Nkem Owoh (Ghana Must Go); IK Ogbonna (Hire a man)	Adesua Etomi, Ivie Okujaye, Beverly Naya (Something Wicked); Yvonne Jegede (The First Lady); Eniola Badmus (Black Val); Helen Paul (Ghana Must Go); Yewande Adegbenro (Yeye Oge); Onyii Alex (Don’t fight it); Nancy Isime (Hire a man)
Most Promising Actor	Most Promising Actress
Rotimi Salami (Just Not Married); Steve Enagbare (Destiny Gate); Bright Wonder (Fidelity); Seun Ajayi (Studio)	Ade Laoye (Studio); Zainab Balogun (A Soldier's Story); Gina Castle (Fidelity); Princess Peters (Destiny Gate)
Best Child Actor	Best Child Actress
Daniel Udah (Opeyemi); Tunde Babasola (D’ Wish)	Angel Unigwe (Woeman); Neraya Akaboa (D’ Wish); Pricilia Ojo (Black Val)
Best Comedy of the Year	Best Movie with Social message
Ghana Must Go; Behind the Scenes; ATM; Not Just Married; The First Lady	Woeman; For the Wrong Reasons; Voiceless Scream; ATM; Leyin Ilekun
Movie with the Best Special Effect	Movie with the Best Screenplay
A Soldier's Story; Icheke Oku; Gbewiri Meta; Storm	Something Wicked; For the Wrong Reasons; Hire a man; Icheke Oku; Just Not Married; Irawe Igbo; Eni-Owo
Best Short Film	Best Documentary
Opeyemi; D' wish; Deeply Cut; Pepper Soup; Silence; Homesick	Amaka’s kin; D' Ability; For you my son
Best TV Series of the Year	Movie with the Best Editing
Lasgidi Cops (SCU); Studio; 5ive; Ayanfe mi	Hire A man; Ghana Must go; Not Just Married; Something Wicked; Eni-Owo
Movie with the Best Soundtrack	Movie with the Best Production Design
Icheke Oku; Igbehinloju; Irawe Igbo; Ghana must go	Hire a Man; Irawe Igbo; Yeye Oge; Icheke Oku; The First Lady; Something Wicked
Movie with the Best Cinematography	Best Use of Nigerian Costume in a Movie
A Soldier's Story; Eni-owo; Icheke Oku; Just Not Married; Something Wicked	Yeye Oge; Irawe Igbo; Icheke Oku; Keji; Ghana must go
Best Use of Make up in a Movie	Movie of the Year
A Soldier's Story; Icheke Oku; Storm; Black Val	Something Wicked; Irawe Igbo; Icheke Oku; A Soldier's Story; Eni-Owo
Director of the Year	Best Kiss in a Movie
Yemi Morafa (Something Wicked); Aliu Gafar (Irawe Igbo); Uduak-Obong Patrick (Not Just Married); Emeka Amakeze (Icheke Oku); Desmond Elliot (Hire A Man); Frankie Ogar (A Soldier's Story); Adebayo Tijani & Muyiwa Ademola (Eni-Owo)	Omowumi Dada and Gabriel Afolayan (Studio); Enyinna Nwigwe and Zhinnel Zhu (Hire a Man); Ik Ogbonna and Nancy Isime (Hire a Man); Seun Akindele and Mercy Aigbe (Victim); Chelsea Eze and Mike Godson (Guy Next Door); Gideon Okeke and Zhinnel Zhu (Anniversary)
Revelation of the Year (male)	Revelation of the Year (female)
Sean Jimoh; Mofe Duncan; Poju Oparanti; Wasiu Rafiu; Jomiloju Olumbe; Femi Remi	Bukky Adeeyo; Inem Peters; Callista Okonkwo; Mercy Macroe; Chineye Uyanna; Victoria Kolawole; Bose Oladimeji; Nkechi Sunday
