= Blogger's Wife =

- Directed by: Toka McBaror
- Produced by: Seun Oloketuyi
- Starring: Segun Arinze, Adejumoke Aderounmu, Deyemi Okanlawon, Ijeoma Grace Agu and Adeniyi Johnson
- Release date: 2017
- Country: Nigeria
- Language: English language

Blogger's Wife is a 2017 Nollywood film produced by Seun Oloketuyi and directed by Toka McBaror. The movie addresses managing professional and family spaces and it stars Segun Arinze, Adejumoke Aderounmu, Deyemi Okanlawon, Ijeoma Grace Agu and Adeniyi Johnson.

== Synopsis ==
The film revolves around a male blogger whose power lies in his internet-enabled laptop who had to meet the wife's expectation. These expectations created suspense throughout the film.

== Premiere ==
The movie was premiered 10 February 2017, and the screening was graced by notable people such as Tamara Eteimo, Feyi Akinwale, Gbenga Adeyinka, Aishat Lawal, Aderounmu Adejumoke, Adunni Ade, Deyemi Okanlawon, Funmi Awelewa and others.

== Cast ==
- Deyemi Okanlawon as Fred
- Ijeoma Grace Agu as Fred's Wife
- Adeniyi Johnson as Business Manager
- Seun Omojola as Actress
- Segun Arinze as Guest Appearance
- Adunni Ade as Guest Appearance
- Aisha Lawal as Actress Friend
- Adejumoke Aderounmu as Blogger's Wife's Friend
- Bukunmi Oluwashina as Actress Friend
