= Kosoko (name) =

Kosoko is a Nigerian given name and surname. Notable people with the name include:

- Kosoko (died 1872), a Nigerian monarch
- Jide Kosoko (born 1954), Nigerian actor and descendant of Kosoko
- Sola Kosoko (born 1976), Nigerian film actress and director, daughter of Jide
- Adekunle Gold (born 1987), real name Adekunle Kosoko, Nigerian musician and descendant of Kosoko
