= Bidemi Kosoko =

Nigerian actress

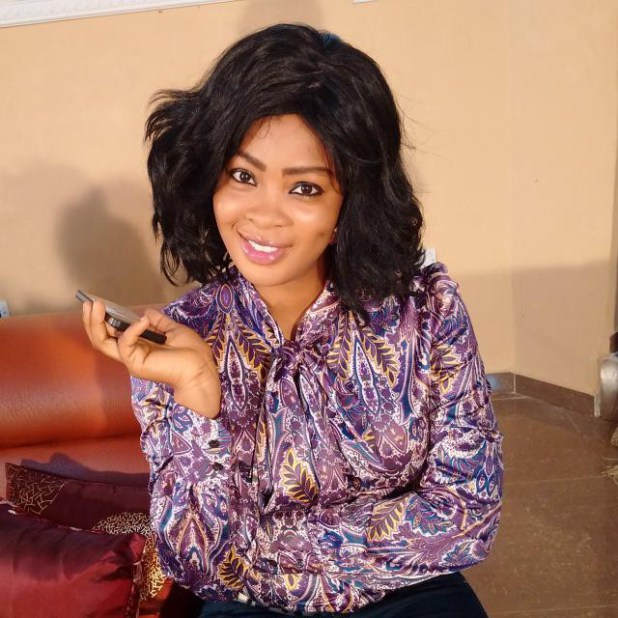
- Born: 21 October 1988 (age 38)
- Citizenship: Nigeria
- Occupation: Actor

Bidemi Kosoko (born October 21, 1986) is a Nigerian Nollywood actress.

== Early life ==
Bidemi was born into the Kosoko royal family of Lagos. She is the daughter of renowned Yoruba actor Jide Kosoko. Her biological mother died in 1993. Bidemi has a sister, Sola Kosoko, who is also an actress. She studied Theatre Arts at Lagos State University.

== Filmography ==
She has featured in the following movies

- Marriage Runs
- Iwe Iranti (2018)
- Alakada Reloaded (2017)
- Ewon Laafin (2015)
- Asiri
- My Mum & I
- Wicked Wife
- Shikemi
- Osan ja (2013)
- The Voice
- Seven Doors (2024 series)
- Depression (2023)
- Professor JohnBull (2016)
