= Damilola Orimogunje =

Nigerian film director and screenwriter

- Citizenship: Nigerian
- Education: Caleb University
- Occupations: Film director, screenwriter, film producer
- Years active: 2014–present
- Known for: For Maria Ebun Pataki (2020); Dear Ajayi (2026)

Damilola Orimogunje is a Nigerian film director, screenwriter and producer.

== Early life and career ==
Orimogunje studied mass communication at Caleb University in Lagos. He later worked as a writer and content producer for Lagos Television, Royal Roots, M-Net Africa and FilmOne.

For Maria Ebun Pataki (2020), which Orimogunje wrote and directed, received six nominations at the 16th Africa Movie Academy Awards, including Best Actress for Meg Otanwa and Best First Feature Film by a Director. At the 2022 Africa Magic Viewers' Choice Awards, Otanwa and Gabriel Afolayan were nominated for Best Lead Actress and Best Lead Actor in a drama, and the film's screenplay was nominated for Best Writer.

Orimogunje's second feature, Dear Ajayi, received €60,000 in post-production support from the Hubert Bals Fund of the International Film Festival Rotterdam in March 2026. It premiered at the 83rd Venice International Film Festival, becoming the first Nigerian production to ever compete in the Giornate degli Autori section. In October 2026 the Nigerian Official Selection Committee chose Dear Ajayi as the country's submission for Best International Feature Film at the 99th Academy Awards, The film is scheduled for cinema release in Nigeria on 13 November 2026.

== Filmography ==
Year	Title	Format	Credited as	Notes
2018	Losing My Religion	Short film	Director	Adapted from a short story by Nike Campbell-Fatoki
2020	For Maria Ebun Pataki	Feature film	Director, writer	
2023	All the Colours of the World Are Between Black and White	Feature film	Producer	
2026	Dear Ajayi	Feature film	Director, writer, producer	

== Awards and nominations ==
Year	Award	Category	Work	Result
2020	Africa Movie Academy Awards	Best First Feature Film by a Director	For Maria Ebun Pataki	Nominated
2022	Africa Magic Viewers' Choice Awards	Best Writer	For Maria Ebun Pataki	Nominated
2026	Venice Film Festival collateral awards	Bisato d'Oro – Best Cast and Performances	Dear Ajayi	Won
2026	Venice Film Festival collateral awards	CICT-UNESCO Enrico Fulchignoni Prize	Dear Ajayi	Won
