= Kesari (2018 film) =

- Directed by: Tope Adebayo
- Written by: Ibrahim Yekini
- Produced by: Ibrahim Yekini
- Starring: Femi Adebayo; Ibrahim Yekini; Adebayo Salami; Muyiwa Ademola; Akin Olaiya; Kemi Afolabiq; Toyin Abraham; Kelvin Ikeduba; Fadeke Adesanya; Rafiu Afolabi; Aremu Afolayan; Fakolade Ajanaku; Otunba Ajibike
- Release date: 2018
- Country: Nigeria
- Languages: Yoruba and English

Kesari is a 2018 Nigerian Yoruba-language action film produced by Ibrahim Yekini. It was directed by Tope Adebayo.

== Synopsis ==
A tough robber armed with charms meets his match in an efficient policeman.

== Cast ==
- Femi Adebayo as Yayi
- Ibrahim Yekini as Kesari
- Akin Olaiya as Bally
- Kemi Afolabi as Amoke
- Adebayo Salami
- Muyiwa Ademola
- Toyin Abraham
- Antar Laniyan
- Bimbo Akintola Odunlade
- Tope Adebayo as Laru
- Fadeke Adesanya as Police Officer
- Rafiu Afolabi as Young Kesari
- Aremu Afolayan as Lexy
- Fakolade Ajanaku as Ifayiwola
- Otunba Ajibike as Babalawo
- Kemi Apesin as Jimi
- Kazeem Bello as Police Officer
- Ojumola Bello as Police Officer
- Dammy Faniyi as Driver
- Kevin Ikeduba as Sky
- Abimbola Kazeem as Jaiye
- Blessing Ugu Okoye as D.P.O.
- Alade Omolade as Police Officer
- Temitope Sholaja as Shade
- Olotu Yusuff as Police Officer

== Production ==
In an interview, writer and producer Ibrahim Yekini said that the film was inspired by the action scenes he saw in the 2018 superhero film Black Panther.

== Awards ==
The film won Best Movie and Best Producer of the year in the Yoruba category at the 2019 City People Entertainment Awards.

== Sequels ==
The film has received three sequels: Kesari 2, Return of Kesari, and Return of Kesari 2. Yekini won Best Actor in a Leading Role (Yoruba) at the 2019 Best of Nollywood Awards for his role in Return of Kesari.
