= Omoniyun =

2019 Nigerian film

- Directed by: Muyiwa Ademola
- Produced by: Dayo Amusa
- Starring: Segun Arinze, Toyin Alausa, Dayo Amusa and Bimbo Thomas.
- Production company: Amzadol Productions
- Release date: 2019
- Country: Nigeria
- Language: Yoruba

Omoniyun is a 2019 Nigerian film produced by Dayo Amusa and directed by Muyiwa Ademola under the production company of Amzadol Productions. The movie that centered around agitating against the molestation of a girl child stars actors and actresses such as Segun Arinze, Toyin Alausa, Dayo Amusa and Bimbo Thomas.

== Synopsis ==
The movie revolves around the story of a young girl that was sexually harassed by a prince who usually goes Scot free with evil deeds. The movie became tensed when the prince had to struggle for his life when human rights activists decided to take up the matter.

== Premiere ==
The movie was premiered on 29 November 2019 at Ozone Cinema in Yaba. Since the movie was set in 1980s, all the attendees such as Iyabo Ojo, Sotayo, Bimbo Thomas, Toyin Alausa, Odunlade Adekola, Muyiwa Ademola, Seliat Adebowale and many others dressed in 1980s costume.

== Cast ==
- Segun Arinze
- Dayo Amusa
- Muyiwa Ademola
- Toyin Alausa
- Olaiya Igwe
- Nkechi Blessing
- Seilat Adebowale
- Bimbo Thomas
