= Nedu Wazobia =

Nigerian on-air comedian

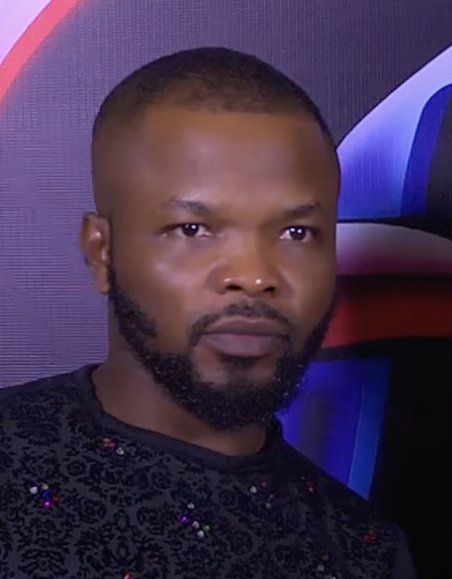
- Born: Chinedu Ani Emmanuel; 5 August 1982 (age 43)
- Other names: Nkechi, Officer Jato, Alhaji Musa
- Occupations: On-air personality, comedian, actor, presenter, events compere
- Organization: Wazobia FM
- Spouse: Uzoamaka Ohiri (married 2013-2018)

Nedu Wazobia (born Chinedu Ani Emmanuel on 5 August 1982) is a Nigerian radio personality, broadcast journalist, TV presenter, actor, comedian, and content creator.

== Early life and career ==
Nedu Wazobia was born in Kaduna, Nigeria. He studied accounting at Madonna University in Elele Okija, Anambra State. He then participated in the mandatory National Youth Service Corps (NYSC) program, where he worked as an on-air personality at a radio station in Jigawa. After working as a site manager in Abuja for two years, he moved to Lagos and joined Wazobia FM as a broadcaster, where he became known by the name "Nedu Wazobia."

== In media ==
He has created recurring characters in his online comedy content, including Sister Nkechi, Alhaji Musa, EndTime Landlord, and Officer Jato in social media comedy skits. He co-hosted the podcast Honest Bunch, alongside Husband Material, Deity Cole, and Ezinne, which discussed topics relevant to millennial and Gen Z audiences. He left the podcast in early 2025 amid a controversy.

== Personal life ==
He married Uzoamaka Ohiri in 2013, and the couple had three children before separating after five years.

== Filmography ==
- Who Cheats More (2017) as Baidoka
- Isoken (2017)
- Meet the In-Laws (2017)
- Boss of All Bosses (2018)
- King of Boys (2018)
- Chief Daddy (2018) as Joro D.
- Flatmates (2018)
- Makate Must Sell (2019) as Pastor
- Papa Benji (2020)
- Ejiro's Lust (2021) as Fred
- Inside Life (2022) as Funky Yaro
- Chief Daddy 2: Going for Broke (2022) as Joro D.

== Brands and endorsements ==
Nedu is a brand influencer and a brand ambassador for MTN, Fidelity Bank, Quickteller, and Sun Lottery.

== Awards and nominations ==
Year	Award	Category	Film	Result	Ref
2023	Africa Magic Viewers' Choice Awards	Best Actor In A Comedy Drama, Movie Or TV Series	Inside Life	Nominated	
