= 77 Bullets =

2019 Nigerian film

- Directed by: Adebayo Tijani
- Produced by: Mercy Aigbe
- Starring: Temitope Solaja, Ibrahim Yekini and Eniola Ajao
- Release date: 2019
- Country: Nigeria
- Language: Yoruba

77 Bullets is a 2019 Nigerian action film produced by Mercy Aigbe and directed by Adebayo Tijani. It stars Temitope Solaja, Ibrahim Yekini and Eniola Ajao.

== Synopsis ==
A ruthless armed robber terrorises the community with the aid of her local charm. Eventually, she runs out of luck and is apprehended. In a twist, the criminal must face her twin, who is a judge, in court.

== Cast ==
- Mercy Aigbe as Susan J.B.O. / Bisola
- Temitope Solaja as Susan's gang member
- Ibrahim Yekini as Silent
- Eniola Ajao as Susan's gang member
- Titi Osinowo
- Bimbo Afolayan
- Eniola Afeez as Adeshina
- Taiwo Ibikunle as DPO Komolafe
- Adeniyi Johnson as Laulu
- Yinka Quadri as Awoyemi
- Awosope Nike as young Susan
- Yetunde Ogunsola as Mummy Susan

== Premiere ==
The film premiered on YouTube on 20 December 2019.

== See also ==
- List of Nigerian films of 2019
