= The New Normal (film) =

- Directed by: Teniola Olatoni
- Written by: Tunde Babalola
- Produced by: Teniola Olatoni
- Starring: Richard Mofe Damijo; Mercy Johnson; Broda Shaggi; Bimbo Akintola; Kehinde Bankole; Femi Jacobs; Femi Blaq; Meg Otanwa
- Cinematography: Adekunle Nodash Adejuyigbe
- Edited by: Ayodele Banjo
- Release date: 15 November 2020 (Lagos, Nigeria)
- Country: Nigeria

The New Normal is a 2020 Nigerian dramedy film written by Tunde Babalola, produced and directed by Teniola Olatoni under the production studio of Sourmash Stories. The film stars Richard Mofe Damijo, Mercy Johnson, Broda Shaggi, Bimbo Akintola, Kehinde Bankole, Femi Jacobs, Femi Blaq, Meg Otanwa, and Mofe Duncan.

== Premiere ==
The movie first premiered on 15 November 2020. The premiere was held at Adam & Eve, Ikeja, and was attended by show business executives and movie enthusiasts. Also, on 20 November 2020, it was screened in over 51 open cinemas across the country.

== Synopsis ==
The movie revolves around the individual lives of four families who are faced with different physical and psychological problems. Despite all these problems, they find different ways of coping with their new normalcies of lives.

== Awards and nominations ==
The movie was named the Best International Narrative at the annual American Black Film Festival (ABFF) Jury Awards, and the award for Best African Female Filmmaker at the Toronto International Nollywood Film Festival (TINFF)

== Cast ==
- Adunni Ade as Monica / Faithful
- Bimbo Akintola as Mama Jade
- Kehinde Bankole as Ejura
- Yemi Blaq as Michel
- Mofe Duncan as Tosan
- Zara Udofia Ejoh as Chioma
- Bikiya Graham Douglas as Annie
- Femi Jacobs as Banji
- Richard Mofe-Damijo as Chairman
- Sani Mu'azu as Ibrahim
- Helen Enado Odigie as Nike
- Mercy Johnson as Jadesola
- Kenneth Okolie as Ifeanyi
- Meg Otanwa as Sadia
- Olumide Oworu
- Broda Shaggi.
