= Family Gbese =

2024 Nigerian film

Family Gbese is a Nigerian comedy-drama film released on 8 November 2024, produced by Inkblot Productions in partnership with Meristem and distributed by FilmOne Distributions.

== Plot ==
Nnamdi Nwagba (Uzor Arukwe), a successful investment banker engaged to Yetunde Olopade (Lilian Afegbai), the daughter of a powerful politician, is living his dream life. But everything changes when he learns that his older brother, Gozie (Mike Ezuruonye), is neck-deep in debt to a criminal gang led by Nnamdi’s godfather, Onise Ojo (Muyiwa Ademola), with the fearsome Ekun (Adeniyi Johnson) acting as his enforcer.

Onise gives Nnamdi an ultimatum: use his position to launder money through a major company project, or risk the safety of his family. With no good options, Nnamdi bows to the pressure, setting in motion a chain of events that threatens his career, his relationship, and his freedom.

As his engagement to Yetunde begins to unravel, Nnamdi finds unexpected support, and growing affection, from his intelligent colleague, Ayomikun (Teniola Aladese). When things reach a boiling point, it is Ayomikun’s tech-savvy younger sister, Lolade (Genoveva Umeh), who steps in. Using a pair of custom surveillance glasses, Lolade gathers crucial evidence that exposes the criminal operation, turning the tables on Onise and his crew.

=== Cast ===
- Uzor Arukwe as Nnamdi Nwagba
- Lilian Afegbai as Yetunde Olopade
- Mike Ezuruonye as Gozie Nwagba
- Teniola Aladese as Ayomikun Balogun
- Ireti Doyle as Dolapo Yetunde’s mother
- Sandra Okunzuwa as Chioma
- Genoveva Umeh as Lolade
- Susan Peters as Tolani Coker
- Muyiwa Ademola as Onise Ojo
- Adeniyi Johnson as Ekun

== Production ==
Michelle Bello directed the film . Written by Chinaza Onuzo, the film was produced through an Inkblot–Meristem collaboration, with a premiere held on 6 November 2024 before its national release on the 8th of November 2025. It was distributed by FilmOne Entertainment and is currently showing on Amazon Prime.

== Reception ==
The film grossed approximately ₦28.1 million in its first two weeks: ₦15.2M in week one and ₦12.7M in week two.
