= Koleoso =

Nigerian Yoruba-language fantasy thriller film series

- Genre: Fantasy; Thriller
- Created by: Ibrahim Yekini
- Written by: Ibrahim Yekini
- Directed by: Ibrahim Yekini
- Starring: Ibrahim Yekini; Oluwakemi Apesin; Saliu Gbolagade; Akinfolarin Olamide; Fatai Odua; Afeez Abiodun; Kelvin Ikeduba; Jimmy Roland; Yetunde Barnabas; Babatunde Bernard
- Country of origin: Nigeria
- Original language: Yoruba
- No. of episodes: 10

Production
- Producer: Ibrahim Yekini

Original release
- Network: YouTube
- Release: May 8, 2025 – 2026

Koleoso is a Nigerian Yoruba-language fantasy thriller film series created, written, directed, and produced by Ibrahim Yekini, who also performs the title role under the screen name Itele D Icon.

The first instalment was released on YouTube on 8 May 2025, and the series was subsequently extended to ten parts. According to Premium Times and Nigerian Tribune, the series became the first single-title Nollywood production and the first African film title to surpass 100 million cumulative views on YouTube.

The series was also reported to have been among Nigeria's most-searched film titles in 2025.

== Plot ==
The series centres on the Oso family, headed by Osogbemi, a practitioner of dark arts rooted in Yoruba spiritual tradition, who raises his three children Koleoso, Oshobola, and Efun with the intention of fortifying them with inherited supernatural power. Koleoso emerges as the most powerful of the three, eventually surpassing his father.

The family's use of these powers brings them into sustained conflict with other practitioners, most prominently a warlock named Jaweshoro, and later with figures identified as Oracle and Iroko, the latter described as a creature that reincarnates upon death.

Later instalments introduced Osowande, a previously unknown son of Koleoso.

== Cast ==
- Ibrahim Yekini as Koleoso, the eldest son of Osogbemi and the most powerful practitioner among his siblings
- Saliu Gbolagade as Osogbemi, the patriarch of the Oso family and a practitioner of dark arts rooted in Yoruba spiritual tradition
- Oluwakemi Apesin as Oshobola, the daughter of Osogbemi
- Akinfolarin Olamide as Efun, the youngest child of Osogbemi
- Fatai Odua as Jaweshoro, a warlock and primary antagonist of the early instalments
- Quadri Bakare as Osowande, a son of Koleoso introduced in the later instalments
- Kelvin Ikeduba as Oracle, an antagonist who appears across multiple parts
- Yetunde Barnabas as Osu
- Afeez Abiodun
- Jimmy Roland
- Babatunde Bernard
- Jumai Sanni
- Ibrahim Chatta as Osopade, Koleoso's great-grandfather, appearing in the tenth instalment

== Production and release ==
The first instalment was released on YouTube on 8 May 2025, followed by the second on 6 June 2025 and the third on 13 June 2025. The series was initially announced as concluding at its seventh instalment but was subsequently extended, with an eighth episode released as the beginning of a second season. The series reached ten parts in total, with the tenth instalment released in late January 2026.

The cast across the series included Oluwakemi Apesin, Saliu Gbolagade, Akinfolarin Olamide, Fatai Odua, Afeez Abiodun, Jimmy Roland, Yetunde Barnabas, Babatunde Bernard, Kevin Ikeduba, and Jumai Sanni, among others.

== Viewership ==
In December 2025, the series appeared among Nigeria's most-searched titles of that year, alongside internationally distributed productions including Wednesday and Squid Game.

As reported by Premium Times and confirmed by Nigerian Tribune, the series accumulated over 100 million cumulative views on YouTube across its ten parts as of late January 2026. Parts four through nine each exceeded ten million views individually, with the first three parts recording between eight and nine million views each. Yekini announced the milestone on his Instagram account on 29 January 2026.

== Critical reception ==
Premium Times published reviews of multiple instalments. A review of the first three parts awarded a rating of 5 out of 10, characterising the narrative as overly reliant on unresolved supernatural conflict and noting that the series appeared directed toward an audience already familiar with Yoruba spiritual tradition, which the reviewer assessed as limiting its broader reach. A review of the fifth instalment offered the same rating, describing the episode as an attempt to adapt traditional Yoruba themes to contemporary settings that did not fully succeed.

Reviews of the eighth and tenth instalments each awarded a rating of 6 out of 10. The review of the eighth episode noted that the decision to extend the series beyond its originally announced conclusion risked diminishing the quality of the franchise. The review of the tenth episode observed that the later parts had become repetitive in structure, with recurring narrative patterns limiting dramatic impact, though it acknowledged that the series retained a degree of appeal through its use of Yoruba spiritual mythology.
