= Soole =

2021 Nigerian comedy film

- Theatrical release poster
- Directed by: Kayode Kasum
- Produced by: Adunni Ade; Lou-Ellen Clara Company Limited
- Starring: Adunni Ade; Lateef Adedimeji; Sola Sobowale; Femi Jacobs; Meg Otanwa; Teniola Aladese; Saidi Balogun; Bukunmi Oluwasina; Odera Olivia Orji; Eso Dike
- Distributed by: FilmOne Entertainment
- Release date: 26 November 2021
- Running time: 116 minutes
- Country: Nigeria
- Languages: English; Yoruba

Soole (English translation: Cheap Ride) is a 2021 Nigerian-comedy film produced by Adunni Ade, a Lou-Ellen Clara Company Limited distributed by FilmOne entertainment, and directed by Kayode Kasum. The film is Adunni Ade's debut production and stars Sola Sobowale, Lateef Adedimeji, Femi Jacobs, Meg Otanwa, Shawn Faqua, Bukunmi Oluwasina, Eso Dike, Teniola Aladese, and Saidi Balogun. It premiered on 21 November 2021 and hit cinemas nationwide on 26 November 2021.

== Selected cast ==
- Adunni Ade as Sister Veronica
- Lateef Adedimeji as Julius
- Teniola Aladese as Clara
- Femi Jacobs as Ifebuchi
- Meg Otanwa as Justina
- Sola Sobowale as Ifeoma
- Bukunmi Oluwasina
- Saidi Balogun
- Mike Afolarin as Maxwell
- Busola Akeeb as Nneka
- Shawn Faqua as Driver
- Ikponmwosa Gold as Pastor Oko
- Odera Olivia Orji as Anwuli
- Eso Dike as Innocent

== Synopsis ==
Soole is the story of a Catholic nun named Veronica, played by Adunni Ade, who travels from Lagos to Enugu after failing to fund an orphanage home. In her journey to Enugu, she opts for a cheap ride option popularly called 'Soole,' where she meets different commuters. The journey from Lagos to Enugu features a lot of drama, including an armed robbery attack on the way to Enugu.

== Premiere ==
The premiere took place at the Filmhouse Cinemas IMAX Lekki in Lagos on 21 November 2021. The event featured celebrities including Kehinde Bankole, Shawn Faqua, and Okey Bakassi.

== Nomination and recognition ==
Shawn Faqua was nominated for his role in Soole in the category Best Actor in a Comedy (Movie/TV Series) at the 2022 Africa Magic Viewers' Choice Awards.
