= Seyi Edun =

Nigerian actress and film producer

- Born: Ayetoro Egbado, Ogun State
- Education: Obafemi Awolowo University
- Occupations: Actress, movie producer
- Spouse: Adeniyi Johnson

Seyi Ẹdun popularly known as Ẹja nla is a Nigerian Actor and film producer. She is well known for her film Ẹja nla, and she is also a wife to the actor, Adeniyi Johnson.

== Early life and education ==
Seyi Ẹdun is a native of Ayetoro Egbado in Ogun State. She received her primary and secondary school education from Tunyo Nursery and Primary school and Anglican Girls Grammar School in Surelere, Lagos. In 2011, She obtained her first degree from Obafemi Awolowo University.

== Personal life ==
Seyi Ẹdun is married to Adeniyi Johnson.

== Career ==
Ẹdun joined the film industry in 2009 through her sister, who is a scriptwriter. In the same year, she enrolled in Wisdom Caucus theatre school and graduated in 2011. In the year of her graduation, she produced her first film titled Ẹja nla.

== Filmography ==
She has featured in the following movies

- Pelumi Jonathan (2022) as Eniola
- Irele (2016) as Lady
- Oko Mi
- Ota mi
- Case Closed
- Wonuola
- Asewo
- Eja nla (2011)
