= Adunni Ade =

Nigerian actress and model

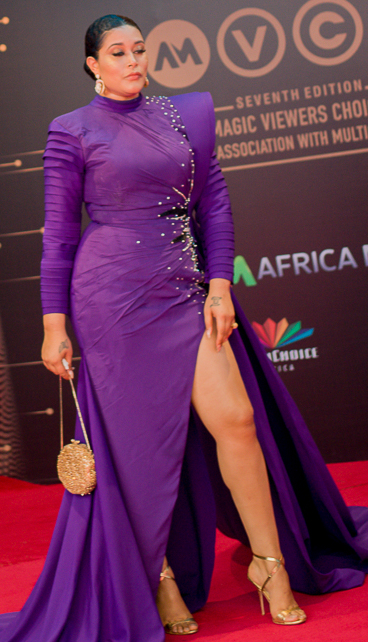
- Adunni at the AMVCAs 2020
- Born: Adunni Adewale; Queens, New York
- Education: University of Kentucky
- Occupations: Actress, film maker, model
- Years active: 2006–present
- Children: 2

Adunni Ade (born 7 June 1986) is a Nigerian American actress and model.

== Early life and education ==
Adunni Ade was born in Queens, New York to a German-Irish mother and a Yoruba Nigerian father.

She returned to Nigeria when she was a year and a half old with her parents to attend her grandfather's burial. She was brought up in Lagos State, Nigeria by her father until she was in her late teens and moved back to the United States for her university education.

She attended the Chrisland primary school, Opebi, Lagos State, where she obtained her First School Leaving Certificate. She obtained her Senior School Certificate Examination (SSCE) at the Bells Comprehensive Secondary School Ota, Ogun State.

Her Lagos-based father, a successful businessman, inspired her to study accounting. Ade studied accounting at the University of Kentucky. Prior to her return to Nigeria, Ade worked with the State of Kentucky in the housing sector, providing living assistance, and also with the State of Maryland, providing medical insurance (Medicare and Medicaid) to those in need.

== Career ==
Ade worked in the housing and insurance sectors in the United States before making a career change to become an entertainer. She ventured into fashion modeling, and was featured on America's Next Top Model. After moving back to Nigeria, she landed her first Nollywood role in the Yoruba language film You or I in 2013.

Her short video comedy skit "Date Gone Bad", which was released on YouTube in 2014, recorded more than 170,000 hits.

Ade has featured in over 250 Nollywood movies in both English and Yoruba languages.

In 2021, Ade ventured into film production with her production company Lou-Ellen Clara Company Limited. She debuted her first film as an executive producer, Soole, featuring A-list actors in the country such as Sola Sobowale, Femi Jacobs, Meg Otanwa, Shawn Faqua, and Lateef Adedimeji. The movie was directed by Kayode Kasum. Soole hit the cinemas November 26, 2021. It grossed 10.2 million naira in its opening weekend and 16 million naira in its opening week. After nine weeks in the cinemas, Soole hit over 51 million naira at the box office, making it one of the top 10 Nollywood movies in cinemas for 2021. In 2022, Soole received an AMVCA (Africa Magic Viewer's Choice Award) nomination for Best Actor in a Comedy for Shawn Faqua.

Ade received her first Yoruba Award for Best Yoruba Actress at the 5th edition of the Cool Wealth Awards.

She received a Stella Award from the Nigerian Institute of Journalism for her efforts in promoting the Nigerian culture.

In 2017, Ade became the brand ambassador for OUD Majestic.

In 2018, she wrote and produced her first Yoruba movie, Emi Mi – My Soul, directed by Saheed Balogun. It starred Ibrahim Chatta, D'Marion Young, Sunkanmi Omobolanle and Sola Kosoko.

Later that year, Ade produced another Yoruba drama movie, Ewa – Beauty, directed by Saheed Balogun and featuring Ibrahim Chatta, Yinka Quadri, Kunle Omisore and Tayo Sobola.

Ade has been featured in over 100 movies in Nigeria (in both the English and Yoruba aspects of Nollywood).

== Personal life ==
Ade is the mother of two boys - Ayden Young and D’marion Young.

== Selected filmography ==
- Tokunbo (2024) as Iya Mulika
- Lakatabu (2024) as Tunmise
- All of Us (2024) as Elijah's Mum
- Funmilayo Ransome-Kuti (2024) as Mrs. Thompson
- Ijogbon (2023) as Chidera
- What No One knows (2023) as Ifelolu Akenuwa
- Walking in the Shadow (2023)
- In Bed with the Pedros (2023) as Teniola
- Intercession (2023) as Nina
- The Devil You Know (2023) as Bola
- Arodan (2023) as Rumola
- The One for Sarah (2022) as Joy
- U-Turn (2022) as Amaga (Paraga Seller)
- Alaga (2022)
- The Perfect Arrangement (2022) as Veronica Otukpo
- Love or Death (2022) as Adesewa
- Iwora (2022) as Doyin
- The Silent Baron (2021)
- Soole (2021) as Sister Veronica
- Witches (2020) as Kemi
- Coincidence (2020)
- Ratnik (2020) as Peppa
- Mama Drama (2020)
- The New Normal (2020) as Monica/Faithful
- Soul Behavior (2020)
- House of Contention (2019)
- Ole Ole (2019)
- Boss of All Bosses (2018)
- The Vendor (2018) as Morayo
- Falz Experience (2018)
- Heaven on My Mind (2018)
- Lagos landing (2018) as Priestess
- Orunsewa (2018) as Ilaorun
- Guynman (2017) as Ayo
- The Island (2017) as Mrs. Coker
- The Blogger's Wife (2017) in guest appearance
- Schemers (2016) as Cynthia
- Diary of a Lagos Girl (2016)
- For the Wrong Reasons (2016) as Boma
- It's Her Day (2016) - Earned her a nomination for Best Supporting Actress at Africa's biggest movie awards, AMVCA, in 2017. She also won Best Supporting Actress Award at the Lagos Film Festival for the movie.
- Head Gone (2015)
- So in Love (2015)
- What's Within (2014)
- 2nd Honeymoon (2014) as Vicky
- You or I (2013) as Titi
- Iwo tabi emi (2011)

=== Television ===
- Behind the Cloud
- Babatunde Diaries
- Jenifa's Diary Season 2
- Sons of the Caliphate Season 2

== See also ==
- List of Yoruba people
