= Nike Campbell =

Author

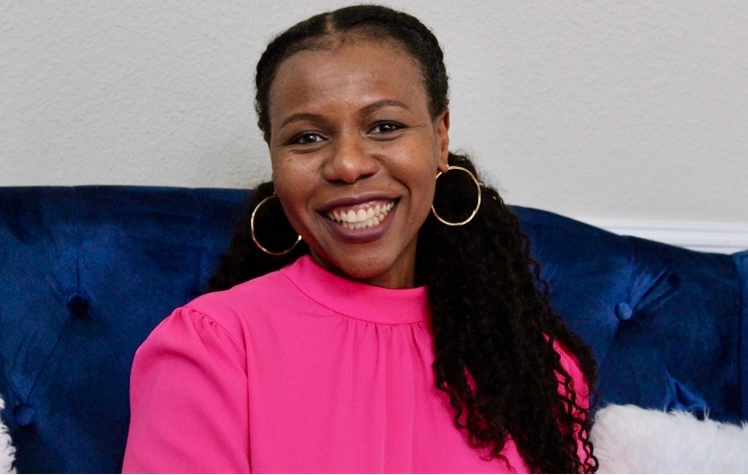
- Education: Queen's College, Lagos; Howard University; American University
- Occupations: Writer; author; budget and finance professional
- Notable work: Thread of Gold Beads, Bury Me Come Sunday Afternoon, Saro

Nike Campbell is an American author with three published books, including two works of historical fiction.

== Early life and education ==
Born in Lviv, Ukraine, Campbell's parents are Nigerian.

She had her secondary school education at Queen's College, Lagos, and her university education at the University of Lagos and Howard University in the United States, where she obtained a Bachelor's degree in economics. Campbell has a Master's degree in International development from the American University in Washington DC.

== Career ==
Her first historical fiction, Thread of Gold Beads, was published in 2012 by Three Magi Publishing. It tells the story of Amelia, the last daughter of King Gbehazin, and the hurdles she faced escaping from Dahomey during the French-Dahomey war. King Gbehazin was the last independent king of Dahomey. According to Campbell, Amelia's character was motivated by the life of her maternal great-grandmother.

Campbell's second work, Bury Me Come Sunday Afternoon, is a collection of short stories published in 2016 by Quramo Publishing. Its themes cut across the immigrant experience, mental health, religion, and domestic violence.

Her third book is a historical fiction titled Saro, which was published in 2022 by Narrative Landscape Press. It tells the story of a king of Egba, Şiwoolu, who was captured with his wife, Dotunu, and transported to Sierra Leone before finding their way back to Abeokuta. Spirituality, the trans-Atlantic slave trade, love, betrayal, and family ties are some of the themes explored in the book.

== Adaptations ==
Three of Campbell's stories have been adapted as plays and short films. In 2014, Thread of Gold Beads was performed as a stage play by the Publick Playhouse for the Performing Arts in Cheverly, United States.

Two of the stories from Bury Me Come Sunday Afternoon: Apartment 24 and Losing my Religion, were adapted as short films in 2018 and 2019 respectively.

Losing my Religion was adapted in 2018. It is directed by Damilola Orimogunje (director of For Maria Ebun Pataki) and features Nollywood stars like Toyin Oshinaike, Omowunmi Dada, Fred Idehen, Ihiechineke Anthony and Brutus Richard.

In 2019, Campbell's Apartment 24 was made into a short film. It is directed by John Uche and stars Olawale Ajao, Kiki Andersen, Dumebi Egbufor and Kike Ayodeji.

== Awards/recognition ==
Campbell was a finalist of the 2018 Red Hen Press Award for Fiction.

== Bibliography ==
- 2012 – Thread of Gold Beads
- 2016 – Bury Me Come Sunday Afternoon
- 2022 – Saro
