= Oga! Pastor =

Nigerian Drama webseries

- Genre: Drama
- Created by: Lani Aisida
- Written by: Lani Aisida
- Starring: Uzor Arukwe; Ini Dima-Okojie; Pearl Okorie; Jimmy Odukoya
- Country of origin: Nigeria
- Original language: English
- No. of seasons: 1
- No. of episodes: 3

Original release
- Network: Ndani TV
- Release: 15 June 2019

Oga! Pastor is a Nigerian drama web series by NdaniTV which was released on NdaniTV's YouTube page in June 2019. The show which was created and written by Lani Aisida ran for 3 episodes until it was canceled by the channel.

== Plot summary ==
Oga! Pastor is based on the story of Deoye Gesinde, a young pastor and the founder of an emerging church called GGBC. The drama showcases the challenges that come from meeting the conflicting demands of his ministry, personal life, and society.

== Cast ==
- Uzor Arukwe as Deoye Gesinde
- Ini Dima-Okojie as Laitan Gesinde
- Pearl Okorie as Moji
- Jimmy Odukoya as Kunle
- Tolulope Odewunmi
- Demi Banwo as Vincent

== Episodes ==
No.	Title	Directed by	Written by	Original release date
1	"11 Days Ago"	Daniel Oriahi	Lani Aisida	15 June 2019
2	"10 Days Ago"	Daniel Oriahi	Lani Aisida	21 June 2019
3	"9 Days Ago"	Daniel Oriahi	Lani Aisida	27 June 2019

== Cancellation ==
After airing 3 episodes, NdaniTV canceled the series and removed the uploaded episodes from YouTube. This occurred following a sexual assault allegation against a Nigerian pastor, Biodun Fatoyinbo and it led to speculations that the takedown was related to the situation even though the series aired before that. Ndani TV did not issue an official statement.
