= Battleground (Nigerian TV series) =

Nigerian television series

- Written by: Pearl Osibu; Kemi Adesoye; Ayoade Adeyanju; Lani Aisida; Bode Asiyanbi
- Directed by: Yemi Morafa; Mike-Steve Adeleye; Sampson Afolabi-Johnson; George Sunom Kura; Uduak-Obong Patrick
- Starring: Gbenga Titiloye; Shaffy Bello; Yinka Davies; Ini Dima-Okojie; Hauwa Alhbura Chike; Ozzy Agu; Joke Silva; Francis Onwuche; Nonso Bassey; Okey Uzoeshi
- Country of origin: Nigeria
- Original languages: English; Nigerian Pidgin
- No. of series: 2
- No. of episodes: 410 episodes

Production
- Running time: 30 minutes

Original release
- Network: Africa Magic
- Release: 7 May 2017 – 5 September 2018

Battleground is Africa Magic telenovela Nigeria series starring Joke Silva, Shaffy Bello, Yinka Davies, Ini Dima-Okojie, Ozzy Agu, Nonso Bassey, Chike, Hauwa Alhbura, Gbenga Titiloye, Francis Onwuche, and Okey Uzoeshi. In its final season, Waje was recurred to join the cast.

== Synopsis ==
The series centers on the wealthy and influential Badmus family, and the internal power struggles and financial conflicts within the household.

== Cast ==
=== Main cast ===
- Joke Silva as Mama Egba
- Shaffy Bello as Adaora Badmus
- Yinka Davies as Cissy Jack Badmus
- Ini Dima-Okojie as Teni Badmus
- Hauwa Alhbura as Ayo Badmus
- Gbenga Titiloye as Kolade Badmus
- Chike as Mayowa Badmus
- Ozzy Agu as Michael Ige Williams
- Francis Onwuche as Peter Ige Williams
- Nonso Bassey as Dr. Emeka Kalu
- Okey Uzoeshi as Ola Badmus
- Daniel Etim Effiong as Evander Obi
- Onyinye Love Mba as Bisi
- Harriet Akinola as Vyhutu
- Zara Udofia Ejoh as Onajite
- Eric Obinna as Eugene
- Victoria Akomas as Hosu
- Chinwe Craig as Sophie Nwelu
- Stephen Ogundele as Moshood
- Keturah King as Lara Bankole Thomas

=== Recurring ===
- Waje

=== Writers ===
- Ayoade Adeyanju (2017-2018) - (unknown episodes)
- Lani Aisida (2017-2018) - (unknown episodes)
- Pearl Osibu (2017-2018) - (unknown episodes)
- Bode Asiyanbi (2018) - (unknown episodes)

=== Directors ===
- Mike-Steve Adeleye - (unknown episodes)
- Sampson Afolabi-Johnson - (unknown episodes)
- George Sunom Kura - (unknown episodes)
- Yemi Morafa - (Episode 100)
- Uduak-Obong Patrick - (unknown episodes)

== Episodes ==
Series	Episodes	Originally released
1	260	7 May 2017
2	150	2018

=== Season 1 (2017) ===
No. overall	No. in season	Title	Directed by	Written by	Original release date
100	100	TBA	Yemi Morafa	Unknown	15 September 2017
Kolade, who had promised to take charge in the 99th episode, lose his position as the CEO of BBP. He resumes work at BBP, ready to humiliate Danlami and nominate Alhaji Tanko Ali as a member of the board. Unfortunately for Kolade, Danlami, thanks to his wife Hadiza, has something up his sleeves. He reveals to members of the board that Kolade is under investigation by the Securities and Exchange Commission and has been meeting in secret with a rival company; therefore, he cannot continue to run the company. Kolade nominates Teniola Bhadmus as the next CEO of the company, while another member of the board nominates Danlami. They all get to vote and the latter emerges the winner.

=== Season 2 (2018) ===
No. overall	No. in season	Title	Directed by	Written by	Original release date
410	150	"Battle Ground Final Showdown"	Unknown	Unknown	5 September 2018
The general and Ola get to the location where Ayo is supposed to be kept and there is a gunfight between The general's men and Godwin's people. Alabama is outside the building when Adze called for an update. He informs Adze they are still there and haven’t heard anything yet. At that point, one of the detectives calls to inform Alabama that Tes is sitting on a bomb but the detonator might be outside and he should search for it. The exact moment Alabama is about searching, a shoot-out occurs.

== Broadcast history ==
The film premiered on Showmax on 9 December 2020.
