= Aliu Gafar =

Nigerian Nollywood actor, producer, and writer

- Oladele
- Born: 2 June 1986 (age 40); Lagos State, Nigeria
- Citizenship: Nigerian
- Occupation: Filmmaking
- Notable work: Seven Doors(Esusu)
- Height: 1.75 m (5 ft 9 in)

Aliu Oladele Gafar (born 2 June 1986), known as Esusu, is a Nigerian Nollywood actor, producer, writer, filmmaker and MC (Compere).

== Early life ==
Aliu Gafar was born on 2 June 1986 in Lagos State, Nigeria. He is a native of Idere in the Ibarapa Central Local Government Area of Oyo State, in southwestern Nigeria. He is a Yoruba Muslim. Due to the demise of his father at a young age, this situation almost affected his schooling and forced him to live with different family members at several points in his life.

== Career ==
Aliu Gafar's interest in acting began in school. His teacher, Mr. Esuola, discovered his talent and cast him in school stage plays. This early exposure helped Aliu develop the interest, passion and courage to pursue a career.

During the period when he lived with extended family members, he took part in church theatre productions.

He started his professional acting career in 2000, when he joined Ogboluke and Jide Are, where he trained as an actor. He sharpened his skills in theatre and screen, and continues to perform on stage.

He featured in several movies, including Seven Doors (Esusu), Jagun Jagun: The Warrior, Lisabi, and Her Excellency.
