= Lucifer (2019 Nigerian film) =

2019 Nigerian action film

- Directed by: Tope Adebayo, Ibrahim Yekini
- Written by: Ibrahim Yekini
- Produced by: Ibrahim Yekini
- Release date: 2019
- Country: Nigeria
- Language: Yoruba

Lucifer is a 2019 Nigerian action film about a man feared in the community. It was directed by Tope Adebayo and produced by Ibrahim Yekini.

== Cast ==
- Ibrahim Yekini
- Temitope Solaja
- Adisa Yusuf
- Taofeek Muyiba Adekemi
- Femi Adebayo
- Bimpe Oyebade
- Bimbo Akintola
- Oshiko Twins
- Bukunmi Oluwashina
- Kelvin Ikeduba
- Tunde Usman
- Antar Laniyan
- Oluwakemi Adejoro Ojo

== Awards ==
Ibrahim Yekini won the award for Best Yoruba Actor at the BON Awards 2020 for his performance in the film.
