= Nonso Bassey =

Nigerian musician, actor, and model

NONZO
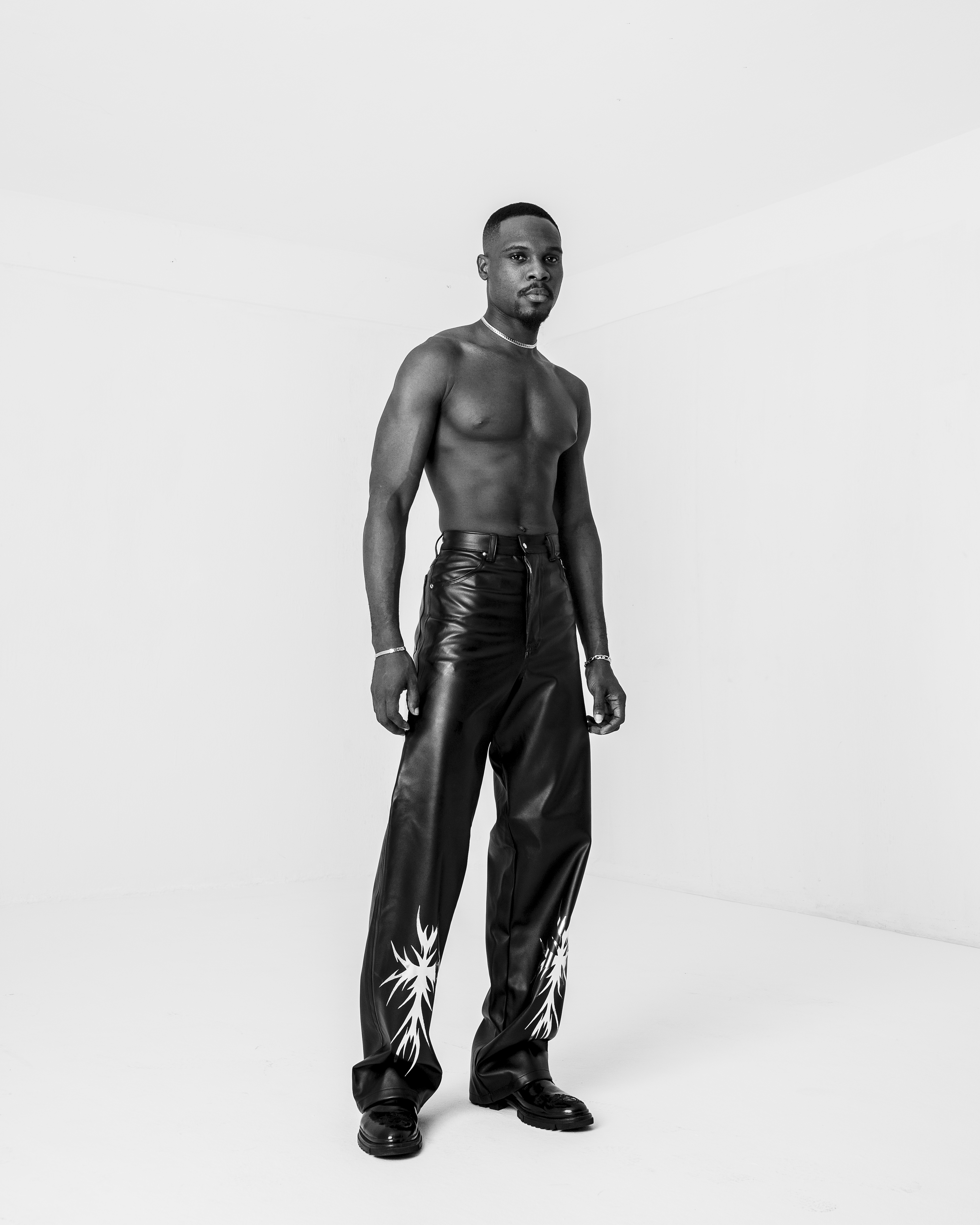

Background information
- Also known as: Nonzo, Prince of Nollywood, (formerly known as Nonso Bassey)
- Born: Chukwunonso Anozuma Bassey Iwuchukwu; Calabar, Cross River, Nigeria
- Genres: Rhythm and blues; world; Afro-pop
- Occupations: Singer; songwriter; actor; model
- Instrument: Vocals
- Years active: 2015–present
- Label: Wild Imaginations

Chukwunonso Anozuma Bassey Iwuchukwu,// popularly known as Nonzo (stylized in all cap NONZO), and formerly known as Nonso Bassey, is a Nigerian singer, songwriter, actor and model. He was among the top 8 finalists in the maiden edition of The Voice Nigeria and was formerly signed to Universal Music West Africa (fka. Universal Music Group Nigeria). He is also a cast member on Africa Magic TV's telenovela, Battleground. Prior to August 2022, he went by the stage name Nonso Bassey.

== Early life ==
Bassey was born in Calabar to an Igbo father from Imo State and an Efik mother from Cross River State.

In 2000, he gained admission to the University of Calabar International Secondary School, Calabar and graduated in 2006. He attended Covenant University, from where he graduated with a second-class upper degree in English and Literary Studies after which he performed his National Youth Service Corps (NYSC) as a Civil Servant in the Aviation Sector in Imo State.

== Career ==
Bassey began his professional music career when he was featured on a song, My Dream with VJ Adams and rapper M.I in 2015. In 2016, he auditioned for the first season of The Voice Nigeria, and made it to the live shows, where he finished as a top 8 finalist and was subsequently signed by Universal Music Group.

In 2017, he was cast in the role of Dr Emeka Kalu on Africa Magic's telenovela, Battleground where his on-screen chemistry with actress Ini Dima-Okojie enjoyed positive reviews from critics. In April 2017, he opened for Aṣa at her concert in Lagos. In the same year, Bassey starred in the movie Wurukum Roundabout alongside several notable African actors, including Juliet Ibrahim, Gbenro Ajibade, Susan Peters and Keppy Young.

In February 2018, Nonso Bassey released his official debut single 411, produced by Johny Drille. The song was well received and Native Magazine's reviewer, Edwin Okolo summarized his review of the single saying, "Only a handful of Nigerian musicians have created ballads so powerful that they were able to steal us away from the hypnotic thump of our incessant Afrobeat march, and with “411", Nonso Bassey seems poised to join those elite ranks."

In April 2019, Bassey released his sophomore single under Universal Music Group Nigeria, a soulful track For You produced by Yekini 'Tiwezi' Temitayo with the video directed by Adesua Okosun.

In October 2019, Bassey was nominated for the award for Best Vocal Performance (Male) for his debut single, 411 at the 13th edition of the Headies Award. He was nominated alongside Johnny Drille, Wurld, Funbi and Tay Iwar.

He changed his name from Nonso Bassey to Nonzo, following the release of his first single in 3 years "Toyo" on 12 August 2022. On 15 December 2023, Nonzo released his first studio album titled Diary of a Lover Boy, released through Prime Disrupt Media, and licensed to Wild Imaginations.

== Awards and nominations ==
Year	Award	Category	Result	Ref
2019	Headies Award	Best Vocal Performance (Male)	Nominated	
2021	Africa Movie Academy Awards	Best Actor in a Leading Role	Nominated	

== Filmography ==
- Battleground (Telenovela - 2017) as Dr. Emeka Kalu
- Wurukum Roundabout (2017)
- From Lagos with Love (2018) as Maxwell McPherson
- Tainted Canvas (2020) as Teacher
- The Smart Money Woman (2020 TV Series) as Olumide Sanni
- La Femme Anjola (Feature film - 2021) as Dejare
- Love Like This (2022)
- Berserk (2022)
- Covenant (2022 TV Series)
- Usifo (2023)
- Bola's Baggage (2023)
- Unscripted (2024 TV Series) as Frank
- Reckless Heart (2024)
- Under Wraps (2024)The Smart Money Woman
- Princess on a Hill (2024)
- Penance (2025)
