= Bukunmi Oluwasina =

Nigerian film actress and singer

- Born: May 7, 1990 (age 36)
- Citizenship: Nigeria
- Education: Obafemi Awolowo University
- Occupations: Film actress singer scriptwriter
- Children: 1

Bukunmi Oluwasina (born 7 May 1990) is a Nigerian actress, producer, screenwriter and singer. Her awards include the 2015 Best Actress of the Year award from the Best of Nollywood Awards for her film Ayomi.

== Early life and education ==
Bukunmi Oluwasina born to the family of seven, hails from Okemesi-Ekiti. She holds a bachelor's degree in Theatre Arts from Obafemi Awolowo University.

== Career ==
Oluwasina produced the movie Ayomi in 2015, which got nominated at the Africa Magic Viewer's Choice Awards and won Best of Nollywood Awards. In 2021, she became the first Nollywood actress to act four different character roles in the movie titled Jankariwo. She is the brand ambassador of Folasade Omotoyinbo's Poshglow skincare.

== Personal life ==
She married her longtime boyfriend, Mr. Ebun, in September 2020. They announced the birth of their first child on March 3, 2021.

== Filmography ==
- Story Like Mine
- Oluwere
- Itan temi
- You are me
- Beautiful Song
- Ayomi (2015)
- Blogger's Wife (2017) as Actress Friend
- Ranti Mi (2018) as Taiwo
- Lucifer (2019)
- Akalamagbo (2019) as Morenike
- Traffic (2020)
- Citation (2020) as Uzoamaka
- Soole (2021) as Girl in Labour
- Obankoba (2021) as Adedunke
- Romeo (2022) as Bewaji
- Half mother (2022) as Adebisi
- Jagun Jagun (2023) as Kitan
- The Couple (2023) as Olaitan

== Discography ==
- Happy Girl
- Everyday Crush
- Kurukuru
- Eiye Adaba

== Awards and nomination ==
Year	Award	Category	work	Result	Ref
2015	Africa Magic Viewer's Choice Awards	Best Indigenous Movie (Yoruba)	Ayomi	Nominated	
2015	Best of Nollywood Awards	Best Actress of the Year	Ayomi	Won	
2015	Moreklue Africa Youths Awards (MAYA Africa Awards)	Best Actress	Ayomi	Won	
2019	Best of Nollywood Awards	Best Actress in a Leading Role (Yoruba)	Akalamagbo	Nominated	
2022	Africa Magic Viewer's Choice Awards	Best Indigenous Language Movie (Yoruba)	Jankariwo	Nominated	
