= Ratnik (film) =

2020 Nigerian science fiction action film

- Promotional Poster
- Directed by: Dimeji Ajibola
- Written by: Dimeji Ajibola
- Produced by: Dimeji Ajibola
- Starring: Osas Ighodaro; Bolanle Ninalowo; Paul Utomi; Adunni Ade; Karibi Fubara; Meg Otanwa
- Production company: Flipsyde Studios Limited
- Release date: December 1, 2020
- Country: Nigeria
- Language: English

Ratnik is a 2020 Nigerian apocalyptic science fiction Dystopian-action film written, directed and produced by Dimeji Ajibola. It is the first of its genre in the Nollywood Entertainment. It stars Osas Ighodaro, Bolanle Ninalowo, Adunni Ade and Tope Tedela. The film was earlier scheduled to be released on April 4, 2020, but was postponed to December 1, 2020 due to the COVID-19 pandemic.

== Plot ==
A World War III fighter returns home only to find chaos, and must race to save the life of her sister who abused a chemical against various progressive war machines.

== Cast ==
- Osas Ighodaro as Sarah Bello
- Ani Iyoho as Mekeva
- Bolanle Ninalowo as Koko
- Adunni Ade as Peppa
- Karibi Fubara as Captain West
- Paul Utomi as Chemical Ali
- Benny Willis as Taurus
- Akah Nnani as Seargent
- Zikky Alloy as Atama
- Meg Otanwa as Angela

== Awards ==
It received the Best Art Director and Best Costume Design award at the 2020 Africa Magic Viewers Choice awards (AMVCA).

== See also ==
- List of Afrofuturist films
