= Just Not Married =

2016 Nigerian heist drama film

- Theatrical release poster
- Directed by: Uduak-Obong Patrick
- Written by: Lani Aisida
- Produced by: Judith Audu
- Starring: Judith Audu; Stan Nze; Rotimi Salami; Ijeoma Grace Agu; Roland Obutu; Brutus Richard; Perpetua Adefemi; Greg "Teddy Bear" Ojefua
- Cinematography: Asurf Oluseyi Amuwa
- Edited by: Asurf Oluseyi Amuwa
- Music by: Wilson Joel
- Production companies: Judith Audu Productions; Blacreek Pictures; Asurf Films
- Distributed by: Atlantic Pictures Limited; Rushlake Media
- Release date: 13 May 2016
- Running time: 102 minutes
- Country: Nigeria
- Language: English
- Budget: $40,000

Just not Married is a 2016 Nigerian heist drama film starring Stan Nze, Rotimi Salami, Roland Obutu, Judith Audu, and Brutus Richards. The film was written by Lani Aisida and directed by Uduak-Obong Patrick. It was shot in Lagos State.

== Plot ==
Joyce Nyamma the matriarch of the Nyamma family is terminally ill and struggling financially. Unlike Joyce, her son, Duke Nyamma, is excited to welcome home his brother, Victor Nyamma who has just been released from prison. Joyce still blames Victor, her first son, for abandoning the family as the man of the house when he went to jail and is fearful that he will be a negative influence on Duke and she warns him to stay away from her son Duke.

Duke realises that there will never be enough money to buy the drugs his mum needs and pay for his tuition fees. He decides to become a car thief and comes up with a gimmick to steal cars. He enlists the help of his friend from the hood, Lati Asunmo, and Lati's ex-girlfriend Keji Anuola, completes the team. The idea is that they would steal cars under the guise of being a newly wedded couple returning from their wedding ceremony in a decorated car.

Their very first operation is very successful. Lati who is a mechanic breaks into the vehicles and hot-wires them. They decorate the car and change into their costumes. Keji acts as the Bride, while Duke is the Groom and Lati is the Driver.

Victor is totally unaware of his brother's new found life and is struggling to find a job and trying to win back his mother's love which is totally futile. Keji and Victor begin a relationship that is kept quiet.

As the months go by, Duke is able to buy drugs for his mum and he is able to stay in school though his grades are affected. But the new found life gets the better of him and he eventually drops out of school.

The team realises that they are being cheated by their buyer Ekun who pays a flat amount for every car stolen. They want more and he isn't willing to pay more. Lati tell the team that he heard of a new buyer who would be willing to pay more. They decide to go see him. They meet with YJ, an ex-convict and former cellmate of Victor. They strike a deal and begin stealing cars for YJ.

Victor finally gets a job as a delivery boy. He still tries to make peace with his mother but she is unforgiving. Consistently working with Keji, Duke is also beginning to feel something for her. Duke asks Lati if he should proceed, Lati encourages him to go on.

On one of their deliveries to YJ, Duke meets his brother at YJ's place, and Duke is introduced as one of his “boys”. Victor tries to warn Duke to leave the life of crime he's begun to lead but Duke is very strong-headed and determined to see it through. His words “I can’t be poor”.

Duke and Keji finally go out on a date. Duke wants out and he tells Keji he wants to stop stealing cars and start something legitimate. But she's not ready to give it up yet. According to her, they all just got started. The new guy pays way better and life is really good. Just when he is about to tell Keji how he feels about her, Lati comes in with news that his mum has passed on. This brings Duke and Victor's world tumbling down. He goes underground for a while. Duke decides to go back into robbery but this time with an exit strategy. He wants to go to Malaysia to continue his education.

They go on a spree and exceed their deliverable. YJ is happy, but a wrong move on Duke's part causes YJ to send his men to find out their Mode of Operation.

During one of their operations, Duke sees ZEB (L.A.S.E) one of YJ's thugs following them. He confronts YJ about this and ends up getting a serious beating. Duke decides that it is time to cut ties with YJ. On their way to tell Keji, they meet Victor.

They decide to call it quits but Lati has been mismanaging his funds and begs them to do one last run.

YJ who has been spying on Duke the whole time tries stealing the money from Duke but Victor comes looking for his brother. YJ tells him that his brother has been nabbed by the police. They get into a fight and Victor ends up killing YJ.

The team goes on their last trip but ends up in a car chase with the police as YJ had tipped the police off. They try to run off on foot. Lati gets caught. An ambush has been laid for Keji at her home. Duke gets to the hotel where he has been staying only to find his brother being carted away by the police. Again his brother has taken the fall for Duke.

Duke leaves town.

== Cast ==
- Stan Nze as Duke
- Rotimi Salami as Lati
- Obutu Roland as Victor
- Judith Audu as Keji
- Perpetua Adefemi as Joyce
- Brutus Richard as YJ
- Ijeoma Grace Agu as Hauwa
- Gregory Ojefua as Ekun
- Sambasa Nzeribe as Bako
- Adedayo Davies as Akanji
- L.A.S.E as Zeb
- Tomiwa Kukoyi as Musa
- Eric Nwanso as Sule
- Adeniyi Johnson as Philip
- Bucci Franklin as Papi
- Seun Afolabi as Rasaki
- Jordan Igbinoba as Chuka
- Oriyomi ‘16’ Oniru as Gowon
- Nneka Pattrick as Ufuoma
- Morten Foght as John Stone
- Chris Biyibi as Uncle Patrick
- Vanessa Kanu as Sharon
- Ubong David as Receptionist
- Omoniyi Sunday as Prison Warden
- Attoh Joseph as Policeman
- Iboro Ntiokiet as Policeman
- Damilola Richards as Policeman
- Oluwadamilare Adegeye as Policeman
- Larry Homs Ahmed as Policeman
- Emem Ekpenyong-Oniru as Salon Customer
- Gladys Tivkaa as Salon Customer
- Adekunle Ademola as Tricycle Driver
- Mudasiru Danjuma as Tricycle Driver

== Production and release ==
Principal Photography began on the 23 August 2015, the trailer was released online on the 4 February 2016. The film was screened at the Lagos Yacht Club on the 13 April 2016 and premiered at the Genesis Deluxe Cinema, Lekki on 6 May 2016. The film was released across Nigeria on 13 May 2016. It was distributed by Metro Classic Pictures in Nigeria, and by Cellarmade Nigeria in foreign markets.

The film was selected to be screened at the 2016 Toronto International Film Festival. The Film's official release poster, which was designed by Femi Morakinyo, has been put up for sale by the Art Nigeria website.

== Critical reception ==
Movie review website www.cinemaguide.com.ng giving it a rating of 7/10, commenting: "Just Not Married is one movie that proves popularity doesn't make a movie superb. We have our eyes set on Judith Audu".

=== Awards and accolades ===
Just Not Married was nominated at the 2016 City People Entertainment Awards for Best Movie Producer of the Year (English).

- Winner, Outstanding Actress, Abuja international Film Festival 2016
- Winner, Best Nigerian Film, Eko International Film Festival 2016
- Nominee, Best Producer, City People Entertainment Awards 2016
- Nominee, Best Producer, ZAFAA Awards 2016
- Nominee, Best Lead Actor, ZAFAA Awards 2016
- Nominee, Best Cinematographer, ZAFAA Awards 2016
- Nominee, Best Lead Actor, Best of Nollywood Awards 2016
- Winner, Best Lead Actress, Best of Nollywood Awards 2016
- Nominee, Best Supporting Actor, Best of Nollywood Awards 2016
- Winner, Most Promising Actor, Best of Nollywood Awards 2016
- Nominee, Best Comedy, Best of Nollywood Awards 2016
- Nominee, Best Screenplay, Best of Nollywood Awards 2016
- Nominee, Best Editing, Best of Nollywood Awards 2016
- Nominee, Best Cinematography, Best of Nollywood Awards 2016
- Nominee, Best Director, Best of Nollywood Awards 2016
- Winner, Best Supporting Actor, Africa Magic Viewers Choice Awards (2017)
- Winner, Nollywood Viewers Choice Awards, MAYA Awards (2017)
- TIFF. Toronto International Film Festival 2016, Official Selection
- Official Selection, STARS ON THE HORIZON, 7th Jagran Film Festival 2016
- Official Selection, The Australian Festival of African Film 2016
- Abuja International Film Festival 2016, Official Selection
- Official Selection, Africa International Film Festival 2016
- Official Selection, Eko International Film Festival 2016
- Official Selection, Nile Diaspora International Film Festival 2016
- Official Selection, Pan African Film Festival, LA 2017
- Official Selection, The African Film Festival, Dallas, 2017
