= Dayo Amusa =

Nigerian actress and singer (born 1983)

- Born: Temidayo Amusa; 20 July 1983 (age 43); Lagos, Nigeria
- Citizenship: Nigerian
- Education: Moshood Abiola Polytechnic
- Occupations: actress; singer; film maker; director
- Years active: 2002–present
- Children: 1 (November 18, 2024)

Dayo Amusa (born 20 July 1981) is a Nigerian actress, singer, television personality, and business woman. She is well known for her performance in Nollywood movies especially Yoruba movies.

== Early life and career ==
Dayo was born in Lagos. She is the first child in a family of Five. Her mother hails from Ogun state while her father is from Lagos. She attended Mayflower School, Ikenne. Dayo studied Food Science and Technology at Moshood Abiola Polytechnic before commencing her acting career in 2002. Dayo had her first production in 2006. Although she acts mostly in Yoruba language films of Nollywood, she has also acted in English language films. Dayo is the Proprietress of PayDab Schools which has two locations in Ibadan and Lagos.

== Awards ==
Year	Award	Category	Result	Ref
2013	Best of Nollywood Awards	Best Kiss In A Movie	Won	
2014	Yoruba Movie Academy Awards	Best Crossover Act	Won	
2018	Best of Nollywood Awards	Best Actress in a Lead Role - Yoruba	Nominated	
2019	Best of Nollywood Awards	Best Actress in a Lead Role - Yoruba	Nominated	

== Singles ==
- Aye Mii
- Ayemi Remix ft Oritsefemi
- Alejo
- Blow My Mind
- Mama's Love
- Omodaddy
- Ife Foju

== Filmography ==
- A Long Night (2015) as Sec
- Omoniyun (2019)
- Ogbe Kan Mi
- Eyin Igbeyawo
- Love is a six Letter word
- Vengeance
- Farugbotayin
- Mama swagger
- Tiwa's Story (2018) as Bose
- Adeife
- kokoro okan
- Meet the In-Laws (2017) as Taiwo
- Iyawo Esu (Devil's wife)
- Aipejola
- The Stranger I Know (2022) as Toyin
- Oye Oran
- Ti Tabili Bayi
- Jagun Jagun (2023) as Ajepe
- Igbale (2023) as Aunty Bola
