= Seven Doors (2024 miniseries) =

2024 6-part limited series

- Genre: Drama
- Directed by: Femi Adebayo; Tope Adebayo; Adebayo Tijani
- Starring: Femi Adebayo; Chioma Chukwuka; Kolawole Ajeyemi; Oga Bello; Jide Kosoko
- Music by: Tolu Obanro
- Country of origin: Nigeria
- Original language: Yoruba
- No. of seasons: 1
- No. of episodes: 6

Production
- Producer: Femi Adebayo
- Editor: Dolapo Adigun
- Running time: 40+ minutes

Original release
- Network: Netflix
- Release: 13 December 2024

Seven Doors is a Nigerian drama television limited series created by Femi Adebayo for the streaming platform Netflix. Set in Ilara, Ondo State, the series explores 18th- and 19th-century Nigeria and serves as the directorial debut of actor and producer Femi Adebayo. It is produced by Euphoria 360 in collaboration with Netflix and is co-directed by Femi Adebayo, Tope Adebayo, and Adebayo Tijani. Femi Adebayo stars as Adedunjoye, alongside Chioma Chukwuka, Oga Bello, Jide Kosoko, Gabriel Afolayan, Hafiz Oyetoro, Ronke Odusanya, Muyiwa Ademola and other cast members. Its plot follows the story of Adedunjoye in Ilara-Mokin, Ondo State, before and after his ascension to the throne as King Adedunjoye.

Seven Doors was premiered on 11 December 2024 in Filmhouse Cinema IMAX in Lekki, Lagos. The series was released theatrically on 13 December 2024 along with all six episodes of the series on Netflix.

== Synopsis ==
Adedunjoye, an ordinary man who loved his wife and kids dearly. He was offered the position of becoming the King of Ilara Kingdom, Ondo State as the Kingship had reached him through his family lineage. Being uninterested in the offer, he turned down the offer. On being persuaded for many times, he finally accepted the offer to become the King. After being made the king, there have been lots of oppositions from people who wanted to create problems for him during his kingship. Soon after becoming the king, the kingdom began facing a lot of problems. Through the efforts of the chief priest, he was told to open seven doors symbolizing seven wives for the sins of his ancestors. The King denied and Ilara kingdom along with the King’s family continued suffering misfortunes even resulting in the death of his daughter.

== Cast ==
- Femi Adebayo as King Adedunjoye
- Chioma Chukwuka as Amaka
- Kolawole Ajeyemi as King Adejuwon
- Adebayo Salami as Otun
- Jide Kosoko as Olukosin
- Hafiz Oyetoro as Agbaakin
- Muyiwa Ademola as Prince Adeoye
- Dele Odule as Agunbiade
- Gabriel Afolayan as Opayemi
- Akeem Adebayo as Subuola
- Aliu Gafar as Esusu
- Olamide Bakare as Fola
- Taiwo Hassan as Oni Rara Akoko
- Adeniyi Johnson as Opabola
- Wumi Toriola as Adejundoye's Wife
- Ganiu Nofiu as Olojongbodu
- Royal Aziomaku as Tade
- Kunle Omisore as Amaka's Uncle
- Bidemi Kosoko as Wale's Sister

== Episodes ==
No.	Title	Directed by	Written by	Original release date
1	"Door Threshold"	Femi Adebayo, Adebayo Tijani & Tope Adebayo	Adebayo Tijani, Yinka Laoye and Oluyombo Soyombo	13 December 2024
Adedunjoye was a simple family man spending time with his beloved wife and two children when Ifa in Ilara unexpectedly chooses his family and subsequently him to become the next Onilara (King) of Ilara Kingdom, Adedunjoye expresses apathy and zero interest to the idea of him becoming king, however his wife Amaka urges him to take on the role and assures him of her support all the way. However in Ilara, certain chief including the Otun were known for committing a lot of atrocities including claiming land of villagers and making life miserable for them, this rogue chiefs have been collecting bribe from Prince Adeoye with the promise to make him the next King.
2	"Door Jamb"	Femi Adebayo, Adebayo Tijani & Tope Adebayo	Adebayo Tijani, Yinka Laoye and Oluyombo Soyombo	13 December 2024
Against all odds and attack, Adedunjoye becomes the King of Ilara, he immediately lay down rules that will govern the Ilara Kingdom and ensures strict compliance, by punishing defaulters - which includes the Powerful Otun's family.
3	"Door Frame"	Femi Adebayo, Adebayo Tijani & Tope Adebayo	Adebayo Tijani, Yinka Laoye and Oluyombo Soyombo	13 December 2024
Several misfortunes soon begin to happen in Ilara including the sudden death of the King's daughter, the bereaved king sought the advice of the priest, who then narrates to King Adedunjoye the past evil deeds of his fore-father who killed his seven wives to buy himself more years on earth, including engaging help from a dangerous person named - Esuru.
4	"Door Lock"	Femi Adebayo, Adebayo Tijani & Tope Adebayo	Adebayo Tijani, Yinka Laoye and Oluyombo Soyombo	13 December 2024
Following the narration of the misdeeds of the past king to King Adedunjoye, he was advised to knock on seven doors, meaning he must marry six additional wives to make it seven wives to avert further trouble to his kingdom. Amaka vehemently refused and was very sad and wished they never accepted to become King in the first place.
5	"Door Swivel"	Femi Adebayo, Adebayo Tijani & Tope Adebayo	Adebayo Tijani, Yinka Laoye and Oluyombo Soyombo	13 December 2024
After much persuasion, King Adedunjoye agrees to marry six additional wives and he brings them to the palace, but the six new wives soon began to make life miserable for Amaka. On a fateful day, the wives connived and poured palm oil on Amaka's dress while going out with the King, furious at the action, the King sent all the six wives out of his palace.
6	"Door Peephole"	Femi Adebayo, Adebayo Tijani & Tope Adebayo	Adebayo Tijani, Yinka Laoye and Oluyombo Soyombo	13 December 2024
The King's action soon annoyed the gods who then sought to take the life of his only son - Tade. Tade was attacked, but the chief priests were able to revive him temporarily, the priest then advised King to bring back the other six wives, which he did and also began to care for all of them. To his greatest shock, the gods came visiting again, the furious King asks the chiefpriest what the issue was, after all he has cared for and brought back the six wives, the chief priest mentions that the King has to confront the god - Esusu one on one to clear the curse.

== Release ==
The series was released on Netflix on 13 December 2024, one day after its premiere.

== Reception ==
Itoro Oladokun of The Guardian Nigeria commended the series for its theme on tradition, power, sins of the fathers and forgiveness. Oladokun also mentioned how the series portrayed inter-ethnic marriages through the characters of Adedunjoye and Amaka. Nosakhale Akhimien of Premium Times gave the series a positive review, praising the storyline, pace of the show, cinematography, effects, costumes, and set design. He specifically commended Muyiwa Ademola and Aliu Gafar on their acting prowess as well as the handling of the Yoruba-Igbo relationship aspect of the show. However, the intricacy of the show can be quite confusing for first-time viewers. Nelson Chigozirim of What Kept Me Up gave the series a mixed review, prasing the performances of Chioma Chukwuka Akpotha and her chemistry with Femi Adebayo, but finding fault with the script for having underdeveloped characters, unrealistic plot twists, and an absence of themes. Chigozirim further pointed out the problems with visually separating the various time periods in the narrative and termed the series flawed though it had universal themes.

=== Awards and nominations ===
At the 11th Africa Magic Viewers' Choice Awards, the film won three major awards: Best Lead Actor for Femi Adebayo, Best Lead Actress for Chioma Chukwuka, and Best Music/Score for Tolu Obanro.

At the 17th Best of Nollywood Awards, the series won multiple honours including Best Series, Best Production Design, Best Special Effect, Best Cinematography and Best Costume.
