= Boss of All Bosses (film) =

2018 film

Boss Of All Bosses
- Directed by: Ike Nnaebue
- Story by: Emeka Kachikwu
- Produced by: Emeka Kachikwu
- Starring: Patience Ozokwor, Akpororo, Bishop Imeh, Adunni Ade, Eniola Badmus, Nedu Wazobia
- Edited by: Mark Grandy
- Release date: June 15, 2018

Boss of All Bosses is a Nigerian family-friendly comedy about the rivalry between two executives; Tony and Samuel, who would stop at nothing for the title of being the top boss. Released on June 15, the movie stars Akpororo, Nedu Wazobia fm, Mama G (Patience Ozokwo), Okon Lagos (Bishop Ime), Senator (Bethel Njoku), Emeka Kachikwu, Adunni Ade, Sani Danja, Eniola Badmus and Babatunde Charles.

== Release ==
Boss of all Bosses was released in Nigeria on June 15, 2018.

== Reception ==
Tireni Adebayo, writing for Kemi Filani News, described the movie as "Profoundly irritating and annoying", and went on to say that the film could well be "the worst Nollywood movie we have ever seen in cinema" and advised viewers to "Work hard to avoid this rubbish forever; even on TV". Omidire Idowu, writing for Pulse.NG, was more praising describing the film as "among the movies that explore Nigerian problems from a fresh perspective".

== See also ==
- List of Nigerian films of 2018
