= Lani Aisida =

Nigerian filmmaker (born 1984)

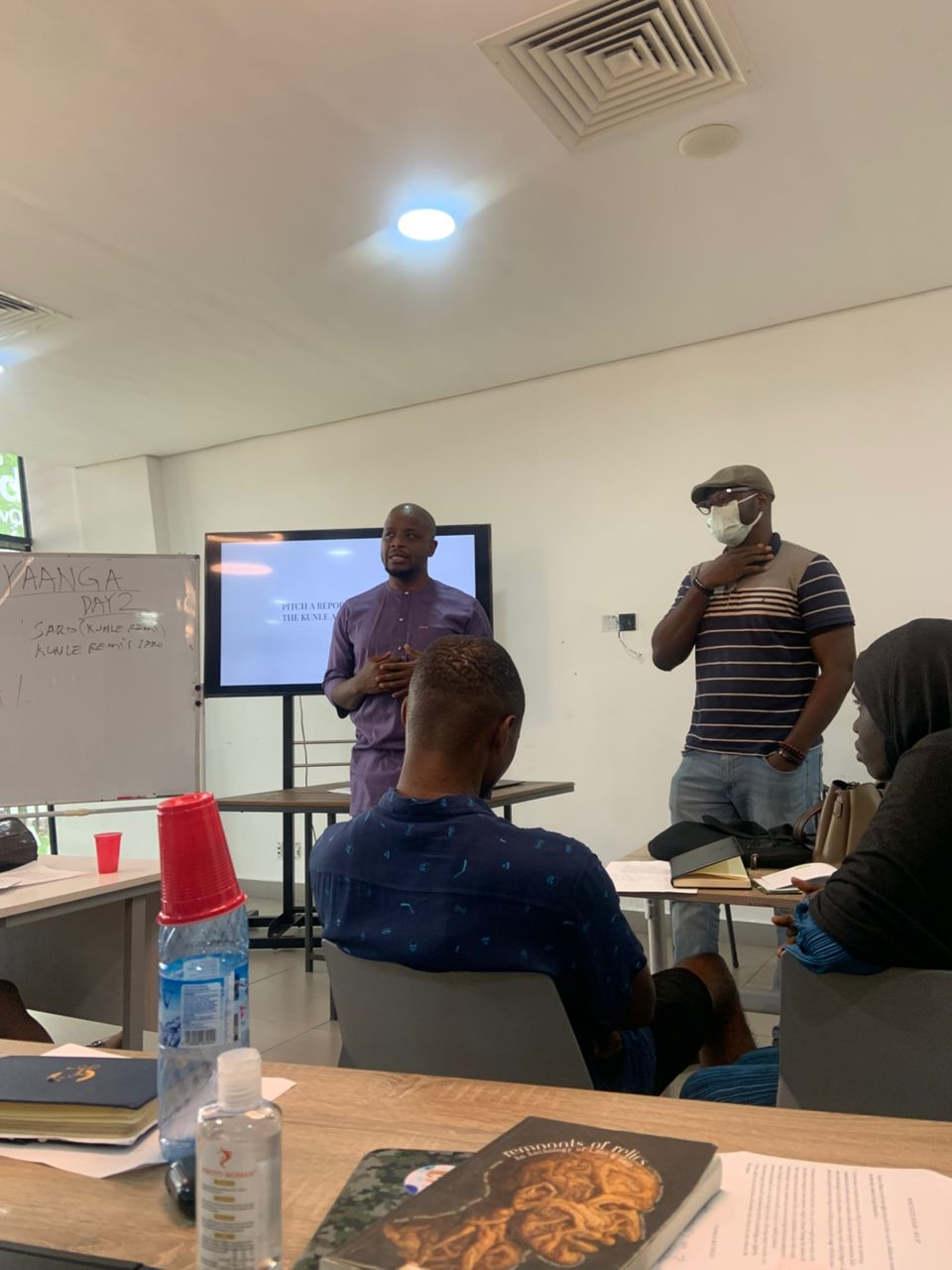
- Lani Aisida at Yaanga Vanguard Writer's Retreat 2026
- Born: Lani Aisida; November 17, 1984 (age 41); Lagos, Nigeria
- Education: University of Lagos, Oxford Brookes University
- Occupations: Film director; screenwriter; producer
- Writing career
- Years active: 2015–present

Lani Aisida (born November 17, 1984) is a Nigerian screenwriter and producer. Among the shows and films he's written for are Oga! Pastor, Skinny Girl in Transit, and Just Not Married, with the last earning him a nomination for a Best of Nollywood Award for Best Screenplay. He has been nicknamed the "King of Web Series" for writing popular webs series.

== Life and career ==
Born in Lagos State, Aisida studied Mathematics and Statistics at the University of Lagos and received a Bachelor of Science from Oxford Brookes University. He is also a former accountant.

Aisida developed a passion for writing while working as a call center agent where he had the idea for Plus 234, a series released in 2015. He has been called the "King of Web Series" for writing popular webs series including My Name is Azed S2, Rumour Has It, Skinny Girl in Transit, Phases, Game On, and Oga! Pastor (which he also created). He wrote the film screenplay for 2016's Just Not Married which was selected for city-to-city viewing at the 2016 Toronto International Film Festival (TIFF). In 2020 he launched the YouTube web series My Birthing Experience which he also produces.

Aisida currently works as Head of Content Development at Ndani TV Communications. He was a finalist for the Best of Nollywood Award for Best Screenplay for Just Not Married.

== Filmography ==
=== Films ===
Year	Title	Director	Writer	Notes
2014	Mixed Emotions	No	Yes	
2014	Love, Lies & Alibi	No	Yes	
2015	2 Broken	No	Yes	
2015	The Other One	No	Yes	
2015	Uncloaked	No	Yes	
2016	Just Not Married	No	Yes	
2017	Put a Ring on it	No	Yes	Also as Assistant Director
2018	The Outcast	No	Yes	
2018	Forgotten	No	Yes	
2025	THE HERD	No	Yes	

=== Television ===
Year	Title	Writer	Story Editor	Creator
2015	Plus 234	Yes	Yes	Yes
2016/2018	Battleground	Yes	No	No
2019	Unbroken	Yes	Yes	No
2020	Riona	Yes	Yes	No
2021	Dilemma	Yes	Yes	No

=== Web series ===
Year	Title	Writer	Producer	Creator
2015	Marriage Counsellor	Yes	Yes	Yes
2018	Skinny Girl in Transit Seasons 5 & 6	Yes	No	No
2019	Oga! Pastor	Yes	No	Yes
2019/2020	Phases	Yes	No	Yes
2020	Game On	Yes	No	No
2021	My Name is Azed Season 2	Yes	No	No
2018/2021	Rumour Has It Season 2 & 3	Yes	No	No

== Awards ==
Year	Association	Category	Result	Ref.
2026	Africa Magic Viewers’ Choice Awards	Best Writing in a Movie	Nominated	
2016	Best of Nollywood Awards	Best Screenplay	Nominated	
