= Yomi Fabiyi =

Nigerian actor

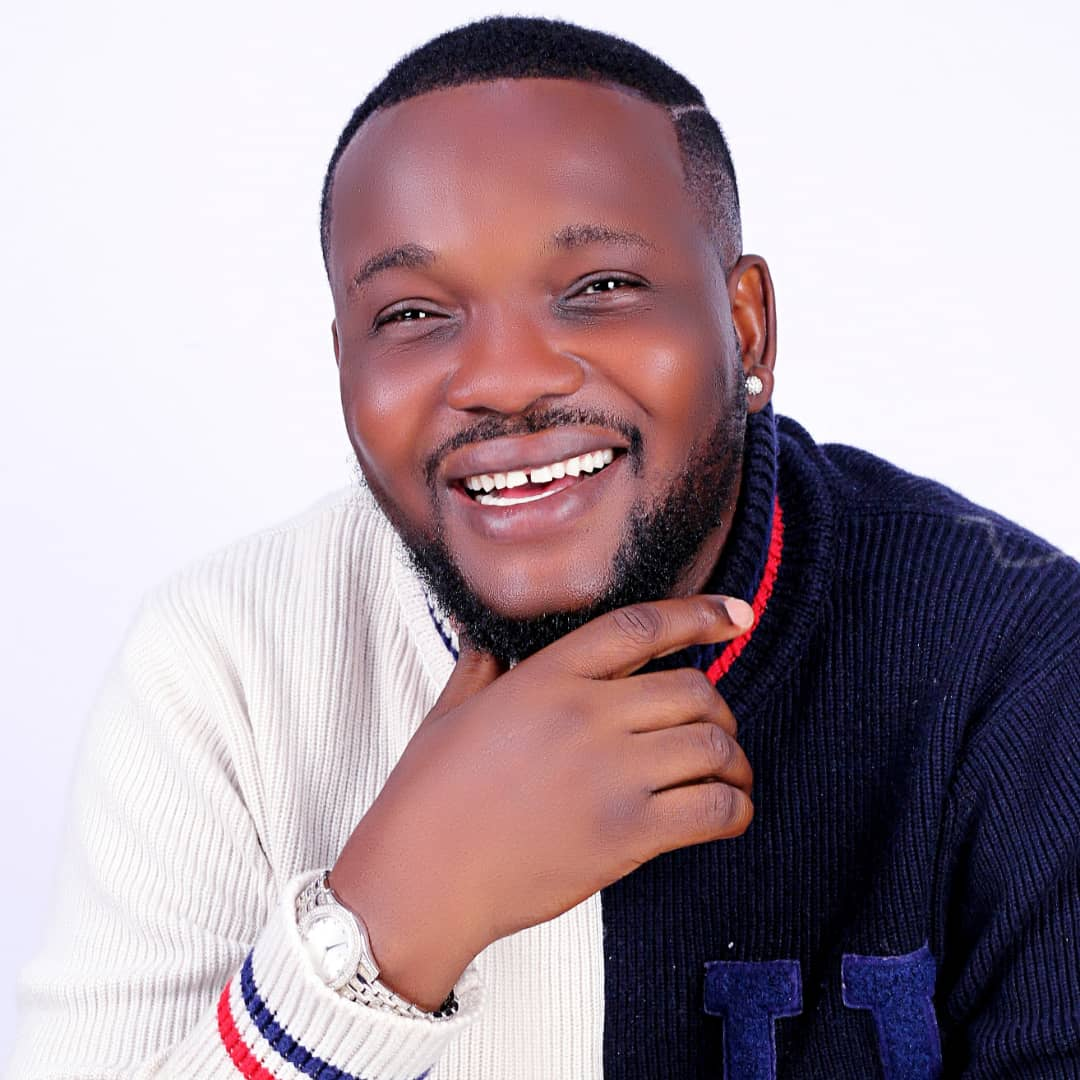
- Born: 1 May 1982 (age 44); Shomolu, Lagos State, Nigeria
- Education: Igbobi College
- Occupations: Actor, filmmaker, director, entrepreneur
- Years active: 2001–present

Lukmon Abayomi Fabiyi (born 1 May 1982), popularly known as Yomi Fabiyi is a Nigerian actor, director, filmmaker and human rights activist.

== Early life and career ==
Fabiyi was born in Shomolu, Lagos State, Nigeria, where he grew up and is originally from Abeokuta in Ogun State. He attended Odunlade Primary School in Shomolu for his primary education and Igbobi College for his secondary education before proceeding for his higher education.

He began his movie career in 2001 through Babatunde Omidina a.k.a Baba Suwe. He later joined Odunfa Caucus in 2003, headed by Yinka Quadri and Taiwo Hassan Ogogo. He has won several awards including the Best of Nollywoods awards for Best Actor in Leading Role, the Best Producer of the Year at the African Films Awards UK and the City People Entertainment Awards for Best Movie of the Year and City People Entertainment Awards for Best Movie Producer of the Year.

In 2018, he was honoured as Human Rights Ambassador to US Embassy Lagos, by US Consul-General to Nigeria in conjunction with CRALI. In 2023, he was awarded a certificate in Human Rights Education Training US Institute of Diplomacy and Human Rights. In September 2024, Fabiyi led a protest regarding the Death of Nigerian singer Mohbad at the Lagos State House of Assembly.

He founded a Human Rights NGO- Break The Silence Foundation and convened a Human Rights Summit in 2019 with Osai Ojigo, Country Director, Amnesty International as the Keynote Speaker, held at Sheraton Hotel, Ikeja, Lagos. He worked at the Lagos State House of Assembly as Personal Assistant/Legislative Aide to Honourable Omogoriola Adeniran Ogbara, representing Somolu Constituency I (2003-2007).

He was one of the leading figures during the #EndSARS protest. Popular with his style of 10days no shower, one outfit and sleeping on the floor of Lagos Assembly and Lekki Toll Gate.

== Personal life ==
He has two sons, Moyinoluwa Fabiyi born 24 March 2008 and Akorede Imoleayo Fabiyi, born 10 February 2022.

Married to Frances Consuelo. A British National on the 22nd December 2012 and divorced on November 22, 2021.
