= Adeniyi Johnson =

Nigerian actor and film producer

- Born: February 27, 1978 (age 48)
- Education: Polytechnic of Ibadan, Lagos State University
- Occupations: Actor, Film producer

Adeniyi Johnson (born February 27, 1978) is a Nigerian actor and film producer.

== Early life and education ==
Johnson was born in the Ikotun area of Lagos State, Nigeria. He had both his primary and secondary education in Lagos, where he obtained his First School Leaving Certificate and Senior Secondary School Certificate. His academic journey continued at the Polytechnic of Ibadan, where he pursued a degree in Mass Communication. He later transferred to Lagos State University, where he studied History and International Relation, ultimately graduating with a degree in the field.

== Career ==
Johnson faced early challenges in his career and struggled to gain recognition. He made his debut in the popular MNET TV series Tinsel, which helped him reach a wider audience. However, he left the show because he was not satisfied with the level of recognition he received. After leaving Tinsel, Johnson moved to the Yoruba section of Nollywood, where his career grew. His big break came when he starred in the award-winning Nollywood movie Blogger's Wife.

In September 2024, he was suspended indefinitely by The African Men Entertainment Kings (AFRIMEK) for gross misconduct and a breach of the club's constitution.

== Personal life ==
Adeniyi Johnson was previously married to Nollywood actress Toyin Abraham in 2013, but their marriage ended in 2015 due to allegations of infidelity. He later remarried actress Oluwaseyi Edun in 2016, and the couple has remained together since.

== Filmography ==
He has featured in the following movies

- Voiceless Scream
- 77 Bullets
- Mo Ta Ka Osi Danu
- Mirror
- Iso Inu Eku
- Lugard
- Blogger's Wife
- Pepeye
- Magnetic Woman
- Afopina
- Ungrateful
- Heroes & Zeros (2012)
- Out of Luck (2015) as Yinka
- Just Not Married (2016) as Phillip
- Meet the In-Laws (2017) as Dapo
- Ada Omo Daddy (2023) as Young Ifeanyi
- House of Ga'a (2024) as Alaafin Abiodun
- Seven Doors (2024 series)
- Family Gbese (2024) as Ekun
