= Judith Audu =

Nigerian actress

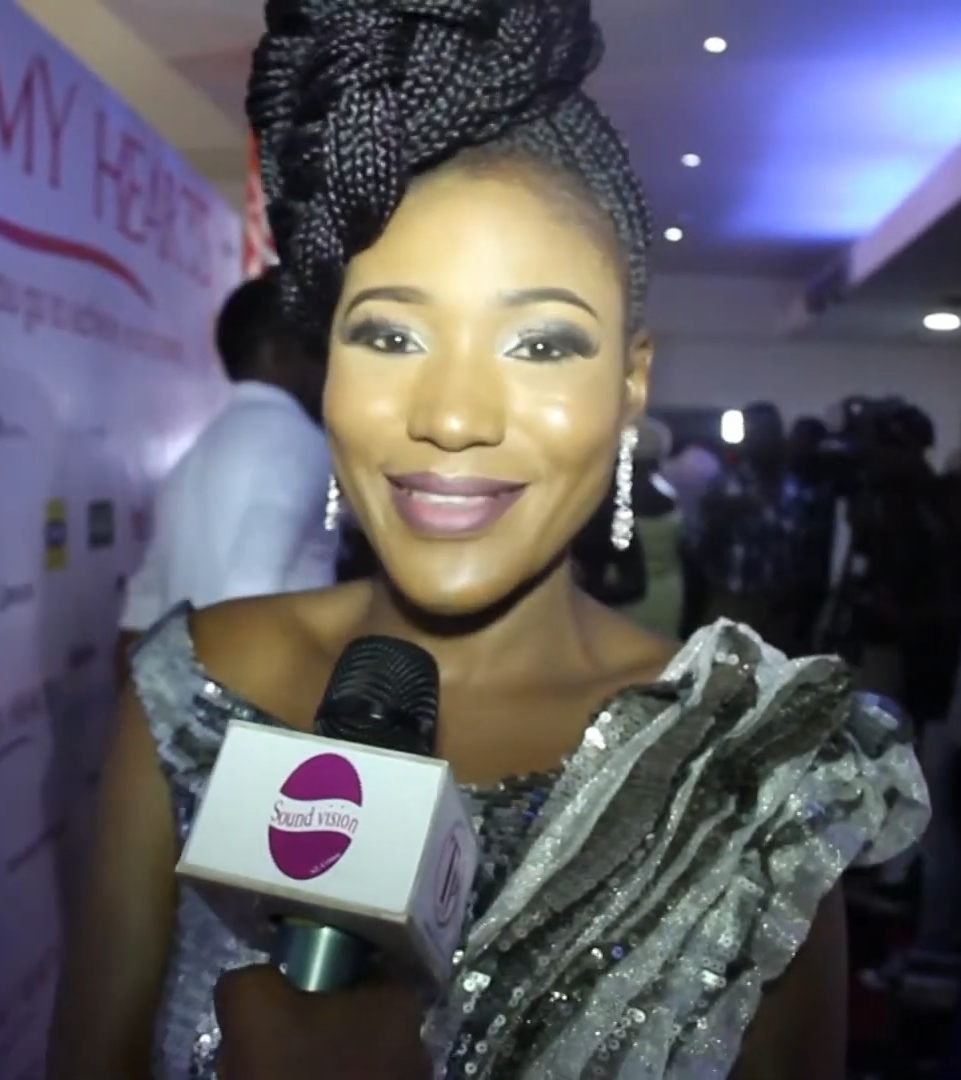
- Judith Audu
- Born: Judith Emike Audu; Ojo, Lagos State, Nigeria
- Citizenship: Nigerian
- Education: University of Lagos
- Occupations: Film producer, film director, TV producer, TV director, showrunner, actress, casting director, presenter, voice over artiste, blogger, model
- Years active: 2004; 2010–present
- Notable work: Just Not Married
- Spouse: Morten Foght
- Awards: 2016:Best of Nollywood Awards, Best Actress

Judith Emike Audu-Foght, professionally known as Judith Audu, is a Nigerian film and television producer, director, casting director, actress, presenter, model and blogger. She is widely known for her movie production credits which include Just Not Married, The Family and The Sessions. In 2019, she was listed among the YNAIJA 100 most Influential Nigerians in Film.

As an award winning Nigerian actress and film maker, she is passionate about social justice and she has been supporting the UN Refugee Agency (UNHCR) since 2019. She also uses her platform to educate on issues relating sexual and gender based violence; this influenced the creation of her film "Not Right" which raises awareness on the domestic violence in Nigerian society and also encourages women to voice out. Judith Audu, is one of Nigeria's sought after young producers in the movie industry; who began her career as an actress and has emerged to be a producer of international reckon. Her first feature film production "Just Not Married" was one of the eight Nollywood movies that was selected which premiered at the Toronto Film Festivals (TIFF) in Canada.

== Early life ==
Audu was born in Navy Town, Ojo to a Naval Personnel father; Audu Ali Audu and mother; Gift Salamat Audu. Her mother was a restaurateur and entrepreneur that owned a chain of restaurants and a rental service for events. Judith has two brothers, elder brother Franklin Audu and a younger brother Abdulmalik Audu. She is the second child and only daughter. She is from the Auchi area of Edo State in the southern part of Nigeria.

Audu attended Navy Town Primary School, Ojo, from 1988 to 1993, then proceeded to Navy Town Secondary School from 1993 to 1999, where she majored in the Arts. She then went to the Nigerian French Language Village, Badagry in 2001 and obtained a Diploma that she used in getting a Direct Entry into the University of Lagos in 2002.

In 2005, Audu obtained a B.A in French from the University of Lagos. After her National Youth Service (NYSC) In Kebbi State in 2006/2007, She went back to the University of Lagos and applied for master's degree course in Public and International Affairs from 2008 to 2010, where she graduated with a degree in Masters of Public and International Affairs (MPIA).

== Career ==
While at the University of Lagos, Audu joined a theater group called the Campus Playhouse and took part in several stage productions. From there she auditioned to be a part of Theater 15 which was the most respected theater group in the University of Lagos at the time. It was from these theatre groups that Audu honed her acting skills and worked alongside Nigerian television personality Denrele Edun, actor/comedian Koffi and Director Wole Oguntokun.

In 2004, when the University of Lagos went on a ten-month strike, Audu was invited by her colleague Denrele Edun to Alpha Vision Company where she auditioned for and got her first role on the small screen in Tajudeen Adepetu's TV Series, One Love. In the same year, Audu officially registered herself as an actor with the Actor's Guild of Nigeria and began attending auditions, through which she got a role in a Ghetto film by Femi Ogedegbe titled Tears of the Ghetto (Life is beautiful). At the end of the University strike, Audu went back to school and took a hiatus from acting, although she did take a part in an independent children's series, Funtime, where she played the role of Vanessa.

During her compulsory National Youth Service, she was the presenter and producer of a programme on Kebbi State Television called French For Beginners and was also the Drama Troupe Director.

In 2011, after completing her master's degree program, Audu attended an audition for a role in the television drama, Tinsel and got the role of a gynaecologist, she has since been part of several Television Series like Emerald, Seekers, Burning Spears, Tinsel, Huzzel, 4 Walls, Comfort Zone, Rush, Funtime, Life is Beautiful, Case File, House Apart and Queens Drive.

In 2014, Audu produced her first film, a short film on domestic violence titled 'Not Right', which starred Omowunmi Dada, Ani Iyoho, Philip Festus and Judith Audu.

In 2014, Audu began airing a radio show on a popular online radio station, Igroove Radio tagged Meet the Actor With Judith Audu where she does personality chats with Actors from all over the world.

In May 2016, Audu produced and premiered her first ever, full-length feature film, under her production company, Judith Audu Productions. The movie, titled Just Not Married features Stan Nze, Rotimi Salami, Ijeoma Agu, Obutu Roland, Brutus Richard, Gregory Ojefua, Judith Audu and Perpetua Adefemi. The movie enjoyed rave reviews and topped cinema ratings across Nigeria in the first few weeks of its release.

== Personal life ==
Judith Audu married Morten Foght on 1 July 2011.

Audu is an avid blogger and has two blogs: www.judithaudu.blogspot.com where she profiles up and coming artists and does entertainment news, and the other is www.playingwithrecipes.blogspot.com where she shares food recipes she plays with as she is also a foodie and loves experimenting and trying out recipes from all over the world.

== Awards and recognition ==
In 2013, she was nominated for the Best Female Actor Award 2013 at the Nigerian Broadcasting Merit Award.

In December 2014, Audu won the award for Best Actress at the In-Short International Film Festival 2014 for her role in the short-film, Alpha Mom.

Audu's short film Not Right, which she produced and starred in was nominated for the 2015 Africa Magic Viewers Choice Awards as 'Best Short Film', the film was also nominated at the Best of Nollywood Awards, Nollywood Movie Awards and at the Abuja International Film Festival in 2014.

In 2016, Audu won the award for Best Actress at the Best of Nollywood Awards for the movie Just Not Married. Audu won the award for Best Actress in a Supporting Role (African Film in English) for the movie Obsession at the 22nd African Film Awards in the UK in November 2018, as well as at the Toronto International Nollywood Film Festival for her role in the movie Unfinished Business.

In February 2020, the United Nations High Commission for Refugees (UNHCR) named Audu as a "high profile supporter" for its "Telling the Real Story" (TRS) project.

In April 2021, she was given a recognition award at the Eko Star Film and TV Awards.

She also received a commendation for her work from the Lagos State Ministry of Tourism, Arts, and Culture in 2021.

Year	Event	Prize	Film	Result
2013	Nigerian Broadcasting Merit Award	Best Actress on TV -	Emerald	Nominated
2014	In-Short International Film Festival	Best Actress	Alpha Mom	Won
2016	Nigerian Models & Achievers Awards	Female Fast Rising Model Actor of the Year	Self	Nominated
2016	Best of Nollywood Awards	Best Actress	Just Not Married	Won
2016	Abuja International Film Festival	Best Actress	Just Not Married	Won
2016	City People Movie Awards	Best Movie Producer of the Year	Just Not Married	Nominated
2016	ZAFAA Awards	Movie Producer of the Year	Just Not Married	Won
2017	Nigeria Entertainment Awards	Supporting Actress of the Year	Self	Nominated
2017	The African Film Festival	Best Actress	Self	Won
2017	Nigeria Achievers Awards	Next Rated Movie Producer of the Year	Self	Nominated
2017	Campus Hubb Awards	Best Youth Actress	Self	Nominated
2018	Starzz Awards	Creative Movie Producer of the Year	Self	Nominated
2018	Toronto International Nollywood Film Festival	Best Supporting Actress	Unfinished Business	Won
2018	African Film Awards	Best Supporting Actress	Obsession	Won
2018	ZAFAA Awards	Movie Producer of the Year	The Family	Won
2018	In-Short International Film Festival	Best Director	Mirabel	Won
2018	In-Short International Film Festival	Best Short Film	Mirabel	Won
2018	Best of Nollywood Awards	Best Short Film	Mirabel	Won
2018	Pearl International Film Festival	Best Non-Ugandan Feature Film	Just Not Married	Won
2019	Toronto International Nollywood Film Festival	Best Nollywood Female Filmmaker	Self	Won
2019	Toronto International Nollywood Film Festival	Best Director Short Film	Mirabel	Won
2019	Abuja International Film Festival	Outstanding Feature Film of the Year	The Family	Won
2019	Golden Movie Awards, Ghana	Best Comedy Film	Bedroom Points	Won
2019	Golden Movie Awards, Ghana	Best Comedy Film	Bedroom Points	Won
2020	Best of Nollywood Awards	Director of the Year	The Sessions	Nominated
2020	Toronto International Nollywood Film Festival	Best Nollywood Director	The Sessions	Nominated
2020	Toronto International Nollywood Film Festival	Best Nollywood Actress	The Sessions	Won
2020	Nollywood Entertainment & Leadership Awards	Best Lead Actor Female	The Family	Won
2020	The Intellects Giant Awards	Movie Producer of the Year	Self	Won
2020	Best of Nollywood Awards	Best Social Message	The Sessions	Won
2020	Best of Nollywood Awards	Best Documentary	Tame the Silent Killer (Documentary on Breast and Cervical Cancer)	Won
2021	Eko Star Film & TV Awards	Producers who make things Happen	Self	Won
2022	Nigerian Women Achievers Awards	Producer of the Year	Self	Nominated

== Filmography ==
=== Production credits ===
Year	Title	Role	Director	Notes
2023	Shanty Town	Line Producer	Dimeji Ajibola	A Giant Media Studios Production
2022	Blood Sisters	Producer	Biyi Bandele / Kenneth Gyang	A Netflix / EbonyLife Studios Production
2022	The King's Horseman (Elesin Oba)	Producer	Biyi Bandele	A Netflix / EbonyLife Studios Production
	Hook Up	Producer	Uyoyou Adia	ROK Studios / Judith Audu Productions
	Special Friends	Producer	Uyoyou Adia	ROK Studios / Judith Audu Productions
2020	The Ring	Producer	Uyoyou Adia	ROK Studios / Judith Audu Productions
2020	Nneka the Pretty Serpent	Associate producer	Tosin Igho	A Play Network Studios Production
2020	Rattlesnake	Line Producer	Ramsey Nouah	A Play Network Studios Production
2020	The Sessions	Producer	Judith Audu	Judith Audu Productions
2020	The Father	Producer	Uyoyou Adia	A ROK Studios / Judith Audu Productions Production
2019	Diary of the Damned	Producer	Judith Audu	A ROK Studios / Judith Audu Productions Production
2019	Tame the Silent Killer (Documentary on Breast and Cervical Cancer)	Producer	Judith Audu	Judith Audu Productions/ Nigerian Ports Authority
2019	The Family	Producer	Judith Audu	A ROK Studios / Judith Audu Productions Production
2018	#TheFourthSide	Producer	Uyoyou Adia	Judith Audu Productions
2018	For Priye	Producer	Moyin Ezekiel	A Hi-Impact TV Production
2018	Nigerian Trade	Production Manager	Jade Osiberu	Produced by Jade Osiberu
2018	Mirabel	Producer	Judith Audu	A Judith Audu Production
2018	Like Dominoes	Producer	Judith Audu	A Hi-Impact TV Production
2018	Bedroom Points	Producer	Judith Audu	A Hi-Impact TV Production
2018	Shelter	Producer	Moyin Ezekiel	A Hi-Impact TV Production
2017	Walking With Shadows	Production Manager	Aoife O’ Kelly	Produced by Oya Media LTD
2017	Gold Statue	Associate producer	Tade Ogidan	Produced by OGD Pictures/ Solution Media and Infotech
2017	Stormy Hearts	Producer	Tope Alake	Produced for Iroko / ROK TV
2016	HAKKUNDE	Production Manager	Asurf Oluseyi Amuwa	Produced by Asurf Oluseyi Amuwa
2016	SCORNED	Production Manager	Christiana Martin, Tokunbo Ahmed	Produced by Christiana Martin, Tokunbo Ahmed
2016	Candle	Production Manager	Taiwo Shittu	Produced by Tamara Eteimo
2015	Hell or High Waters	Production Manager	Asurf Oluseyi Amuwa	Produced by Asurf Oluseyi Amuwa
2015	Just Not Married	Producer	Uduak-Obong Patrick	Produced by Judith Audu
2014	Not Right	Producer	Uduak-Obong Patrick	Produced by Judith Audu

=== Directorial credits ===
Year	Title	Role
2018	Mirabel	Director
2018	Flipped	Director
2018	Morning Fix	Director
2018	Heart Break	Director
2018	Like Dominoes	Director
2018	Bedroom Points	Director
2019	The Sessions	Director
2019	The Family	Director
2019	Diary of the Damned	Director

=== Acting credits ===
Year	Title	Role	Director	Notes
2004	One Love	Chika	Wasiu Onitilo	TV series
2004	Life is Beautiful	Jossy	Femi Ogedengbe	Feature Film
2004	Hammer	Fela's Girl	Izu Ojukwu	Feature Film/Cameo Appearance
2006	Funtime	Vanessa	Nkiru Okonkwo	TV series
2010	House Apart	Sasha	Tony Enejedu	TV series
2010	Huzzel	Jennifer	Davies Obiekea	TV series
2011	Tinsel	Gynecologist	Tope Ogun, Victor Aghahowa and George Kura	TV series (Recurring Role)
2012	The Journey	Wunmi	Femi Adewale	TV series
2013	Emerald	Mofe	Tope Alake and John Njamah	TV series
2013	4 Walls	Tutu's mother	Kolade Shasi	Short Film
2013	Yes I Don't	Sheyi	Best Okoduwa	Feature Film
2013	Switch	Sade	Best Okoduwa	Feature Film
2013	Seekers	Dupe	Yemi Remi	TV series
2013	Burning Spears	Omowunmi	Segun Kayode	TV series
2013	Olorogun and Company	Avwebo	Segun Kayode	TV series
2013	Comfort Zone	Nina	Obi Osotule	TV series
2013	Love is Over-rated	Chinelo	Belinda Yanga	Feature Film
2014	Stopping Kloe	Evelyn	Ehizojie Ojesebholo	Mnet Original TV Film
2014	Alpha Mum	mother	Akin Harrison	Short Film
2014	Out of Fire	Angelina	Ehizojie Ojesebholo	Mnet Original TV Film
2014	Not Right	Funmi	Uduak Obong Patrick	Short Film
2014	A Day with Death	Kulapo	Oluseyi Asurf	Short Film
2015	Tales of Eve 5	Nengu	Imoh Umoren	TV series
2015	Mama Osaro Goes Kinky		Ehizojie Ojesebholo	Comedy
2016	Just Not Married	Keji Anuola	Uduak-Obong Patrick	Feature Film, Produced by Judith Audu Productions, Blacreek Pictures and Asurf Films
2019	The Family	Lead	Judith Audu	Feature Film, Produced by Judith Audu Productions, featuring Omowumi Dada, Judith Audu, Tina Mba, Mofe Duncan, Beverly Osu and more
2019	#TheFourthSide	Boss	Uyoyou Adia	Short Film
2019	The Sessions	Elohor	Judith Audu	Feature Film
2019	City of Bastards			
2020	Nneka the Pretty Serpent	Pathologist	Tosin Igho	Feature film
2020	For Maria Ebun Pataki	Tola	Damilola Orimogunje	
2021	Country Hard	Iredia's Mum	Paul Utomi	Crime / Drama
2024	L.I.F.E.	Restaurant Lady	Uyoyou Adia	Mystery

== See also ==
- List of Nigerian bloggers
