= Ibrahim Yekini =

Nigerian actor

- Born: Bariga
- Other names: Itele; Itele D icon
- Awards: 2020 Best of Nollywood Awards

Ibrahim Yekini Salako, popularly known as Itele, is a Nigerian actor and filmmaker. He won the award for the Best Actor in a Lead Role at the 2020 Best of Nollywood Awards for his role in Lucifer.

== Filmography ==
- Kesari (2018)
- Omo Ghetto: The Saga (2020)
- King of Thieves (2022)
- JBO (Jaguda Baba Ole) (2023)
- A Tribe Called Judah (2023)
- Dolapo Douglas (2024)
- Jagun Jagun (2023)
- Lisabi (2024)
- Koleoso (2025)

== Awards and nominations ==
Year	Award	Category	Film	Result	Ref
2019	City People Entertainment Awards	Producer of the Year	Kesari (2018 film)	Won	
2019	City People Entertainment Awards	Best movie of the Year	Kesari (2018 film)	Won	
2019	Best of Nollywood Awards	Best Actor in a Lead Role	Kesari (2018 film)	Won	
2020	Best of Nollywood Awards	Best Actor in a Lead Role (Yoruba)	Lucifer	Won	
2024	Africa Magic Viewers’ Choice Awards	Best Supporting Actor	Jagun Jagun	Nominated	
2025	Emperor Awards	Nollywood Producer of the Year award	koleoso	Won	
