= Seun Omojola =

Nigerian singer, songwriter and actress

- Born: Oluwaseun Omolara Omojola; Lagos, Nigeria
- Occupations: Singer, songwriter, actress, producer
- Years active: 2003–present
- Notable work: Mo fe bae lo

Seun Omojola (born as Oluwaseun Omolara Omojola) is a Nigerian singer, songwriter and actress. She has used Vilara as her stage name but decided to stick to her real name Seun Omojola. Her music debut single 'Mo fe bae lo' was released in March 2012. Since starting acting in 2003, she has featured in over 20 Nollywood and Yoruba movies. She is also known for her big breasts.

In 2016 she starred opposite Joke Jigan, Jaiye Kuti and Temitayo Adeniyi in Taloniro, which was unveiled at the London Film Academy in January. Later in the year she appeared opposite Frederick Leonard, Bolanle Ninalowo and Esther Audu in Unjustified.
