= For Maria Ebun Pataki =

- Directed by: Damilola Orimogunje
- Starring: Meg Otanwa; Gabriel Afolayan; Tina Mba
- Edited by: Tunde Apalowo
- Distributed by: Netflix
- Release date: November 3, 2020 (UK)
- Running time: 76 minutes
- Country: Nigeria
- Language: Yoruba

For Maria Ebun Pataki is a 2020 drama film directed by Damilola Orimogunje. It features Meg Otanwa and Gabriel Afolayan in the leading roles. The film explores post-partum depression and was filmed in Yoruba language with English language subtitles. The film earned six nominations in the 2020 Africa Movie Academy Awards.

== Plot ==
Derin suffers a turbulent time while in labour and subsequently delivers her first child named Maria. Following this, she keeps to herself and is unable to participate in celebratory rites and the care of her newborn. Not understanding her plight, Derin's mother-in-law verbally abuses her saying she is not a good mother.

== Cast ==
- Gabriel Afolayan as Afolabi
- Meg Otanwa as Derin
- Tina Mba as Grandma
- Judith Audu as Tola
- Demi Banwo as AY
- Tubi Aiyedehin as Doctor
- Dayo Akinboro

== Production and release ==
For Maria Ebun Pataki was the debut feature film of Damilola Orimogunje. Damilola Orimogunje said in an interview that he was inspired to make the film after watching a French film titled Amour and having a conversation about post-partum depression. It was shot for a period of 9 days in November 2019 in Ojodu, Lagos. Meg Otanwa revealed via an Instagram post that she intentionally gained weight for her role in the film in order to portray a realistic post-birth body. The film premiered in November 2020 at Film Africa where it won the Audience Award for Best Narrative Feature. It started streaming on Netflix on 16 January 2022.

== Reception ==
For Maria Ebun Pataki received largely positive reviews as it was described by the BBC as "intimate, artistic, unusual" and by the Guardian as “a quietly affecting Nigerian film.” A reviewer for the Daily Trust praised the writing saying "The performances are stellar in this film, but the writing is a blinding light. The writers make the story connect with the audience by creating a world full of characters that are real and tangible".

=== Awards and nominations ===
Year	Award	Category	Recipient	Result	Ref
2020	Africa Movie Academy Awards	Achievement in Sound	For Maria Ebun Pataki	Nominated	
2020	Africa Movie Academy Awards	Achievement in Soundtrack	For Maria Ebun Pataki	Nominated	
2020	Africa Movie Academy Awards	Achievement in Screenplay	For Maria Ebun Pataki	Nominated	
2020	Africa Movie Academy Awards	Best Nigerian Film	For Maria Ebun Pataki	Nominated	
2020	Africa Movie Academy Awards	Best Actress in a Leading Role	Meg Otanwa	Nominated	
2020	Africa Movie Academy Awards	Best First Feature film by a Director	Damilola E. Orimogunje	Nominated	
2022	Africa Magic Viewers' Choice Awards	Best Actress in A Drama	Meg Otanwa	Nominated	
2022	Africa Magic Viewers' Choice Awards	Best Actor in A Drama	Gabriel Afolayan	Nominated	
2022	Africa Magic Viewers' Choice Awards	Best Picture Editor	Tunde Apalowo	Won	
2022	Africa Magic Viewers' Choice Awards	Best Sound Editor	Tom Koroluk	Nominated	
2022	Africa Magic Viewers' Choice Awards	Best Writer	Tunray Femi And Damilola Orimogunje	Nominated	
