= Henrietta Kosoko =

Nollywood actress (died 2016)

- Died: 10 June 2016
- Occupation: Actress
- Spouse: Jide Kosoko.

Henrietta Kosoko// was a Nollywood actress. She came into the limelight in 1995 after starring in mainstream Nollywood movies like Onome and Omolade. She was married to the veteran actor Jide Kosoko. She was buried on 10 June 2016.
