= Meet the In-Laws (2017 film) =

Nigerian film

- Directed by: Niyi Akinmolayan
- Starring: Lilian Esoro; Adeniyi Johnson; Dele Odule; Amaechi Muonagor; Dayo Amusa
- Distributed by: Netflix
- Release date: 2017
- Running time: 75 minutes
- Country: Nigeria
- Language: English

Meet the In-Laws is a 2017 Nigerian film written by Rita Onwurah and directed by Niyi Akinmolayan. The movie stars various actors and actresses from the Nigerian movie industry such as; Adeniyi Johnson, Lilian Esoro, Kenneth Okolie, Dele Odule, Dayo Amusa, Tina Mba amongst others.

== Selected Cast ==
- Adeniyi Johnson as Dapo
- Lilian Esoro
- Dele Odule as Papa Dapo
- Amaechi Muonagor as Okoro
- Dayo Amusa as Taiwo
- Tina Mba as Iya Dapo
- Kenneth Okolie as Chijioke

== Synopsis ==
Meet the In-Laws is a story of two young adults who fell in love and got engaged. It was later discovered that the union would not go as planned as their respective parents oppose of the union since the man is from the Yoruba tribe and the woman is from the Igbo tribe. This caused a lot of chaos and later on, the couple finds out that the actual reason for the opposition of their respective parents to the marriage is much deeper than just tribal differences.

== Nomination and recognition ==
Amaechi Muonagor was recognized and nominated for his role in Meet the in-Laws film in the 2017 Africa Magic Viewers' Choice Awards under the category for Best actor in a comedy.
