= Temitope Solaja =

Nigerian film actress

- Born: 14 February 1992 (age 34)
- Other name: Star Girl
- Citizenship: Nigeria
- Education: Tai Solarin University of Education
- Occupation: Film actress

Temitope Solaja (born 14 February 1992) is a Nigerian film actress, screenwriter and film producer.

== Early life and education ==
Solaja is the first child of her parents and a native of Sagamu, Ogun State. She holds a bachelor's degree in mass communication from Tai Solarin University of Education.

== Career ==
In 2008, Solaja got her first acting role in the film Bamitale. Opolo, produced by Sola Akintunde Lagata, brought her into the limelight because of her sub-lead role in 2009. In 2015, she wrote and produced her own film Aruga, in which she also starred alongside Antar Laniyan and Sunkanmi Omobolanle.

In 2017, she was nominated for Best Actress in a Leading Role (Yoruba) at the Best of Nollywood Awards.

== Filmography ==
- Bamitale
- Opolo
- Idemu Ojo kan
- The Antique (2014)
- Adajo Aiye
- Kudi Klepto
- Bella (2015)
- Firepemi
- Aruga (2015)
- Darasimi
- Awelewa
- Orente
- Juba
- Aromimawe (2016) as Kofo
- Your Wife is My Slut (2017)
- Kesari (2018) as Shade
- Adebimpe Omo Oba (2019) as Feyisara
- The Wrong Turn (2019) as Bimpe
- Lucifer (2019)
- 77 Bullets (2019) as Susan's gang
- Kadara (2022) as Titi

== Awards and nominations ==
Year	Award	Category	Work	Result	Ref
2015	Best of Nollywood Awards	Best Supporting Actress (Yoruba)	Bella	Nominated	
2017	Best of Nollywood Awards	Best Actress in a Leading Role (Yoruba)	Ashabi Akata	Nominated	
