= Jide Kosoko =

Nigerian actor (born 1954)

Omoba Jide Kosoko
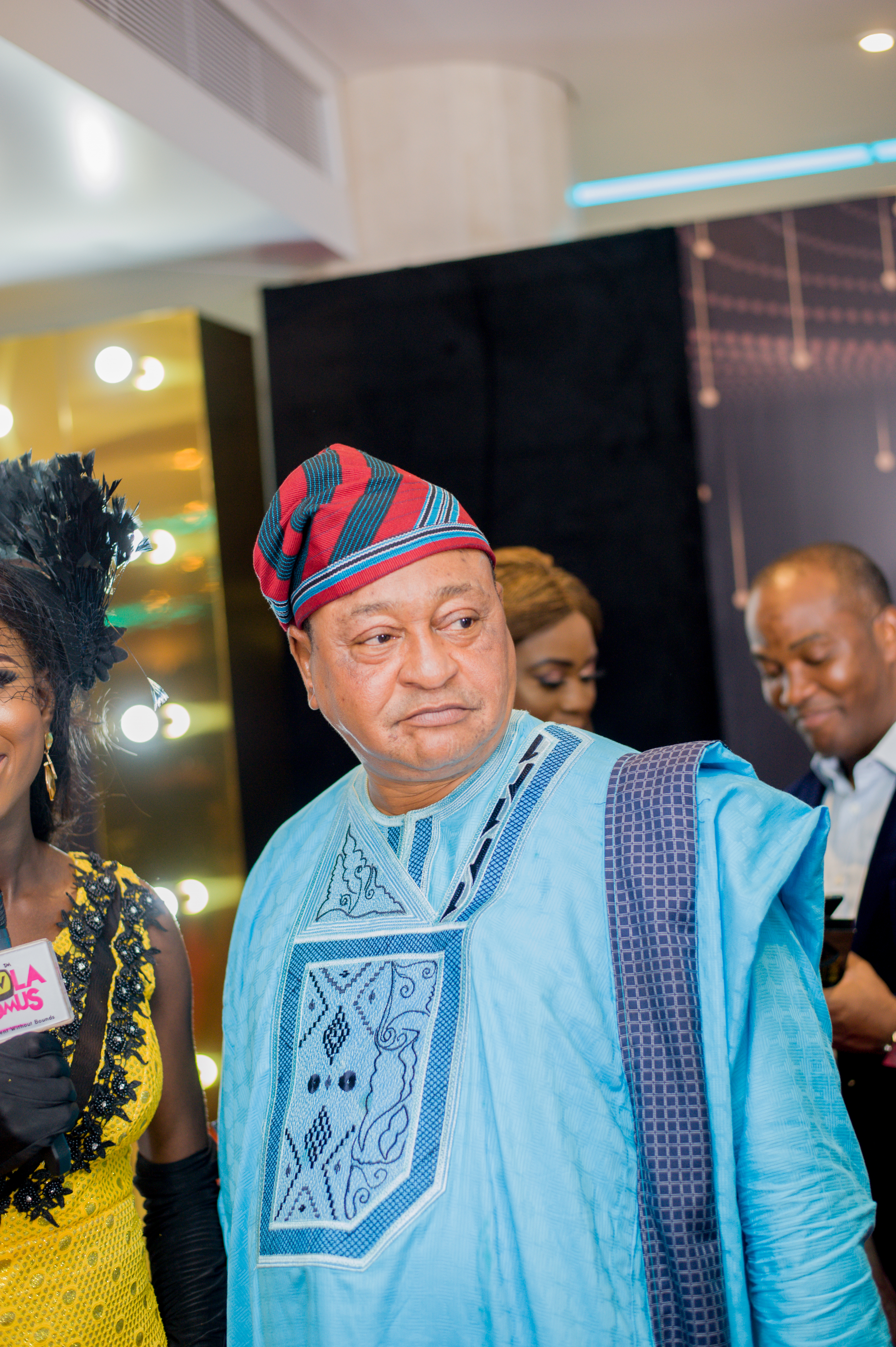
- Jide Kosoko at 2020 AMVCA
- Born: Babajide Kosoko; 12 January 1954 (age 72); Lagos Island, Lagos, British Nigeria
- Citizenship: Nigeria
- Education: Yaba College of Technology
- Occupations: Actor; Director
- Years active: 1964–present
- Spouses: Karimat Kosoko; Henrietta Kosoko
- Children: Sola Kosoko; Bidemi Kosoko; Tunde Kosoko; Temilade Kosoko; Muyiwa Kosoko

Jide Kosoko (born 12 January 1954) is a veteran Nigerian actor, director and producer. He was born into a royal family, hence his traditional title of prince or "omoba" in the Yoruba language.

== Early life ==
Jide Kosoko was born in Lagos State, Nigeria, on 12 January 1954, to the Kosoko royal family of Lagos Island.

== Career ==
Kosoko studied business administration at the Yaba College of Technology. He began his acting career as a child actor in 1964 in a television production named Makanjuola. He has featured in several Nollywood movies in both English and Yoruba languages.

Kosoko grew up in Ebute Metta and was inspired by the huge success of Hubert Ogunde to go into acting when an acquaintance who was working with the Ifelodun travelling theatre troupe invited him to an audition for a role in Makanjuola, a tele-movie. Kosoko accepted the invitation; he later went for the audition and was chosen for the role, playing a character called Alabi. Kosoko continued with acting, he then performed with the Awada Kerikeri group consisting of Sunday Omobolanle, Lanre Hassan and Oga Bello ⁣and had guest appearances on the T.V. show, New Masquerade. In 1972, he formed his own theatre troupe.

Kosoko has written and also produced his own films and stage plays, including Ogun Ahoyaya. Kosoko became visible during the video film era, producing his own film, Asiri n la in 1992, starring in Asewo to re Mecca and Tunde Kelani's Ti Oluwa Ni'Le part 2.

Endorsement

Kosoko is an ambassador for a popular juice production company, Chivita. In 2016, he endorsed MeritAbode Limited, owners of Emerald Estate. Kosoko is also one of the brand ambassadors for Western Lotto situated in Nigeria.

Awards and nominations

In 2021, Abuja International Film Festival nominated Kosoko as the Outstanding Male Actor in Love Castle.

== Personal life ==
Kosoko was married to two wives, Karimat and Henrietta, ⁣and has children and grandchildren. He is known to be the biological father of six children, which are Bidemi, Sola, Temilade, Tunji, Muyiwa, and Tunde Kosoko.

== Partial filmography ==
- 50/50 (1992)
- Nkan La (1992)
- Asiri-nla (Top Secret) (1993) (also director)
- Ibi ọmọ (Child's Placenta) (1993)
- Oro Nla (1993)
- Aiye Ma Le (1994)
- Ajeji (Stranger) (1994)
- Anike Banana (1994)
- Arewa Okunrun (Queen of the Dark) (1994)
- Aye Lọja (1994?) (also producer)
- Eya (The Duplicate) (1994?) (also writer)
- Glamour Girls (1994)
- Iṣẹdalẹ (Tradition) (1994) (director and writer only)
- Iya Buruku (The Bad Mother) (1994)
- Iyawo Alarede (The Legal Wife) (1994?) (also co-director)
- Iyawo Alhaji (The Story of Society in Decay) (1994)
- Makanjuola (Avid Not for Wealth) (1994)
- Morẹnikẹ Alagolo (1994?) (also writer and producer)
- Ọkọ Iya (Step Father) (1994) (also writer)
- Olaiyonu (Evils of Fortune) (1994)
- Olorun Anu (The Merciful God) (1994)
- Adegbesan (1995)
- Agbelebu (1995) (also writer)
- Ala Otito (True Dream) (1995)
- Alamojuto (Caretaker) (1995)
- Aye Olaju (Civilisation) (1995?)
- Bantale (1995?) (also director)
- Bukọla ọmọ daddy (1995?)
- Bus Conductor (1995) (writer only)
- Danfo Driver (1995) (also director and writer)
- Deadly Affair (1995)
- Diamond (1995?)
- Dr Brown (1995)
- Edunjobi (Twins) (1995) (also director and writer)
- Eni Bi Okan (1995)
- Ẹran ìyà (Scape Goat) (1995)
- Ipo-ola (1995) (writer only)
- Irawo Mi (My Star) (1995)
- Itunu (Consolation) (1995?)
- Koseegbe (1995)
- Millionaire (1995?) (also director and writer)
- Omo-olorire (Lucky Boy) (1995) (also director)
- Adesewa (1996?) (director only)
- Adetoun (1996)
- Afomo (1996) (director and writer only)
- Agbekele (1996)
- Aje Igboro (1996)
- Arole (1996) (also director and writer)
- Ayo Ayo-Ju (Excessive Joy) (1996?)
- B'aiyetigba (1996) (also director)
- Binta My Daughter (1996)
- Bolanle (1996)
- Epon Agbo (1996)
- In the Name of the Father (1996)
- Lady Terror (1996) (also director)
- Lakiriboto (1996?)
- Love '96 (1996?)
- Nemesis (1996) (also director and writer)
- Never Again (1996)
- Ohun Eniyan (Voice of the People) (1996)
- Ojo Ayo (1996?)
- Aiyedun (1997?)
- Alaba Meta (1997) (also director and writer)
- Alejo Pataki (1997)
- Aya Rere (The Good Bride) (1997)
- Ere-Ese (1997)
- Fake Dollars (1997?)
- In Love Again (1997)
- Ina-ife (1997)
- Iku-Arewa (Death of a Queen) (1997?) (also director)
- Jejelaye (Easy Life) (1997) (also director and writer)
- Pam Pam: From the Adventure of Lokko and Mambo (1997)
- Soko Soja (1997) (also writer)
- Area Father (1998)
- Enulebo (1998?) (also director)
- Highway to the Grave (2000)
- Stupid! (2002)
- Mr. President (Ààrẹ Apàsẹ Wàá) (2004)
- Afefe Ti Fe... (2005) (also director)
- Omorewa (2005?)
- Jenifa (2008) as Chief Williams
- The Figurine (2009) as Chairman
- I'll Take My Chances (2011) as Minister
- Last Flight to Abuja (2012) as Chief Nike
- The Meeting (2012) as M.D
- Doctor Bello (2013) as Corporal Olurin
- Dining with a Long Spoon (2014)
- Gidi Up (2014) (TV Series) as Commissioner Olaitan
- Out of Luck (2015)
- The Department (2015)
- Hourglass (2016)
- Fusion (2016)
- Alter Ego 1 (2017) as Landlord
- The Royal Hibiscus Hotel (2017) as chief Segun Adeniyi
- One Lover Two Hearts (2017)
- The Third Chance (2017)
- Ghetto Bred (2018) as Chairman
- King of Boys (2018) as Alhaji Salami
- Kasala (2018) as Big Boss
- Power of 1 (2018) as Governor
- Stronger Together (2018) as Bayo Tailor
- Akpe: Return of the Beast (2019)
- Bling Lagosians (2019) as Baba Eko
- House 69 (2019)
- Love is war (2019)
- Made in Heaven (2019)
- Merrymen (2019) as Chief Omole
- More Than Just 4 Letters (2019)
- Sugar Rush (2019) as Chief Douglas
- Two Weeks in Lagos (2019) as Dr. Makinde
- City Of Dreams (2019) as Chief Coker
- My London Slave (2019) as Bisola's Uncle
- The White Shadow (2019)
- Dear Affy (2020) as M.D
- Day of Destiny (2020) as Chief Adediran
- Shadow Parties (2020)
- Breaded Life (2021) as D.P.O
- Love Castle (2021) as Chief Otun
- Kiki's Dilemma (2021)
- The Mystic River (2021) - Nigerian Series - as Ede King
- Shadow Parties (2021) as Chief Atilola
- Elesin Oba, The King's Horseman (2022) as Sergeant Amusa
- Rising City of Dreams (2022)
- The Stand Up (2022)
- The Wildflower (2022) as Chief Judge
- Chasing Shadows (2022) as Mr Ossai
- Rainbows (2022) as Chief Williams
- U-Turn (2022) as Cycle Man
- Atunwa (2023)
- Shattered Innocence (2023) as Daddy Jamal
- Merry Men 3: Nemesis (2023) as Chief Jimoh Alade
- A Bag of Trouble (2023)
- Safe (2024) as Chief
- The Way We Were (2024)
- Behind Closed Doors (2024)
- Life and Dirt (2024 TV Series) as DPO
- The Suyis (2024 TV Series) as Pa Suyi
- Funmilayo Ransome-Kuti (2024)
- Seven Doors (2024)

== See also ==
- List of Yoruba people
- List of Nigerian actors
- Yaba Higher College alumni
