= Sola Kosoko =

Nigerian film actress (born 1980)

Omoba Sola Kosoko-Abina
- Born: 7 January 1980 (age 46)
- Education: Olabisi Onabanjo University
- Occupation: Actress
- Years active: 2000–present
- Known for: laroda ojo
- Notable work: laroda Ọjọ́, oko irese, Ọmọ bishop
- Spouse: Abiodun Abinna
- Children: 2
- Parent(s): Jide Kosoko; Henrietta Kosoko

Sola Kosoko, otherwise known as Sola Kosoko-Abina (born 7 January 1980), is a Nigerian film actress and film director known for Láròdá òjò. She is the daughter of Jide Kosoko. Sola kosoko starred in the movie Pala pala which also featured Yemi Solade and Muyiwa Kosoko. She addressed the Nigeria youth during the Media Literacy and Capacity Building program.

== Education ==
Kosoko holds a bachelor's degree in Sociology from Olabisi Onabanjo University.

== Career ==
Kosoko began her acting career professionally in 1999 where she featured in a movie titled Ola Abata produced by her father; Jide Kosoko. In 2001, she acted in the movie Omo Olorire which made her popular. She has acted in several movies in English and Yoruba since she started acting.

== Personal life ==
Sola Kosoko is one of the daughters of Jide Kosoko. She is married to Abiodun Abinna, and they have two daughters (Oluwasindara and Oluwasikemi) and a son (Oluwasire).

== Awards and nominations ==
- City people award nominations

== Selected filmography ==
- Ola Abata (1999)
- Oko Irese (2000)
- Omo Olorire (2003) as Enitan
- Oko Irese
- Omo Bishop (2005)
- Eje Adegbenro 2 (2006) as Akowe Adegbenro
- Onitemi (2007)
- Láròdá òjò (2008) as Shade
- Apaadi (2009)
- Eti Keta (2011) as Ifeoma
- Oloruka (2017)
- Oga (2017) as Demi's Friend
- Palace (2018)
- Ainiwa (2021) as Sindara
- Shadow Parties (2021) as Asabi
- Jemila
- Valley Between
- Roses and Thorns
