= Meg Otanwa =

Nigerian actress

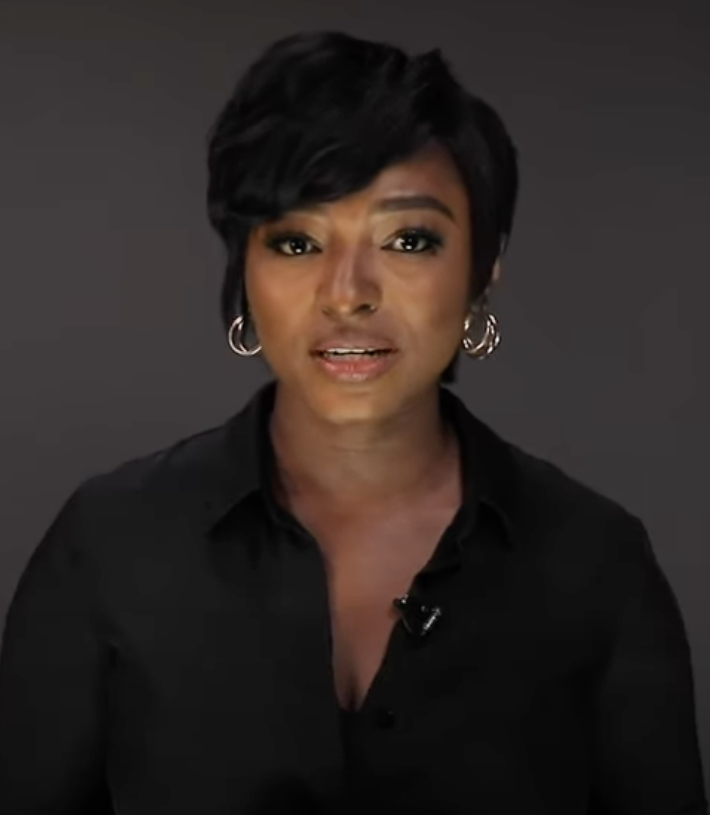
- Born: Meg Otanwa; 14 February; Nigeria
- Citizenship: Nigeria
- Education: Ahmadu Bello University, Zaria, Nigeria (BA); TIME University, Tunis, Tunisia (MA); Jean Moulin University, Lyon, France (MA)
- Occupations: Actress, banker
- Years active: 2011–present
- Known for: October 1 (2014); Before 30 (TV series 2015-present); Kpians: The Feast of Souls (2014)
- Notable work: Ojuju

Meg Otanwa (born 14 February) is a Nigerian actress and former banker. She made her Nollywood debut in 2011 in the film, I'll Take My Chances and has featured in films such as October 1 (2018), Ojuju (2014), Kpians: The Feast of Souls (2014) and many others. She was the November 2006 cover star of Zen magazine.

== Life and education ==
Otanwa hails from the Idoma speaking area of Benue State, Nigeria, growing up partly in Lagos. She comes from a polyglot family and speaks about five languages including English, Yoruba, French, Hausa, her mother tongue Idoma and some Spanish. She is a graduate of Ahmadu Bello University, Zaria where she obtained a bachelor's degree in English language, then proceeded to obtain a master's degree in Human Resources Management at TIME University, Tunis, Tunisia and afterwards, for a Master of Business Administration degree at Jean Moulin University, Lyon, France.

== Career ==
Having worked for a long period at the African Development Bank, Tunis, Tunisia, Otanwa resigned and picked up a career in acting, making her Nollywood debut in 2011, featuring in the dance drama film by Emem Isong, I'll Take My Chance. In 2014, she was starred in Kunle Afolayan's film, October 1; in Bodunrin Sasore's drama series, Before 30, starring as "Aisha"; and in Charles Novia's film, Atlanta.

She was starred in the 2016 Africa Magic's debut telenovela, Nollywood's Hush, as "Koko Ogunbiade". Also featured are Richard Mofe Damijo, Thelma Okoduwa and Rotimi Adelegan.

She got nominated at the 2017 Africa Magic Viewers Choice Awards for the Best Actress in a Drama category and the AMVCA recognition award for MNET original series, which she won, for her role in the thriller telenovela, Hush. The actress was also present at the red carpet of the 2018 event.

In the 2018 Tosin Igho film titled, The Eve, she was starred as "Alero", acting alongside actors and actresses like Beverly Naya, Hauwa Allhabura, John Okafor and others.

In the 2020 film, For Maria Ebun Pataki, directed by Damilola Orimogunje, she was starred as "Derin".

She was featured as "Angela" in Dimeji Ajibola's sci-fi thriller, Ratnik, which was released on 1 December 2020 also featuring Osas Ighodaro, Tope Tedela, Karibi Fubara, Paul Utomi and others.

== Filmography ==
Year	Film	Role	Notes	Ref.
2025	After 30			
2024	Freedom Way	Funke	Drama	
2023	Married to Work	Yvonne Ezenna	Comedy / Romance	
2022	In Another Life	Tega Dede	Comedy / Romance / Family / Drama	
2021	Loving Rona	Actress (Rona Adams)		
2020	The New Normal			
2020	Ratnik	Actress (Angela)	Sci-fi thriller	
2020	For Maria Ebun Pataki	Actress (Derin)	Drama	
2018	Payday	Actress (Kimberley)	Comedy	
2018	The Eve	Actress (Yewande)	Romantic drama	
2018	Knockout Blessing	Actress	Action, Comedy, Thriller	
2017	Light Will Come	Dupont		
2016 - 2017	Hush	Actress (Koko Ogunbiade)	Telenovela thriller; TV series	
2016	Derailed	Chioma		
2015–present	Before 30	Actress (Aisha)	Drama series	
2015	Road to Yesterday	Actress (Tomiwa)	Romance, Drama, Thriller	
2015	Doll House	Actress (Yemisi)	Drama	
2014	October 1	Actress (Yejide)	Thriller	
2014	Kpians: The Feast of Souls	Actress (Jane)	Action, Horror	
2014	Ojuju	Actress (Alero)	Horror, Thriller	
2013	All That Glitters	Yvonne		
2011	I'll Take My Chances	Actress	Dance drama	
2020	The New Normal	Sadie		

== Accolades ==
Year	Event	Prize	Work	Result	Ref
2017	AMVCA	Best Actress in a Drama		Won	
2022	Africa Magic Viewers' Choice Awards	Best Actress in A Drama	For Maria Ebun Pataki	Pending	

== See also ==
- List of Nigerian actors
