= Kelvin Ikeduba =

Nigerian actor (born 1976)

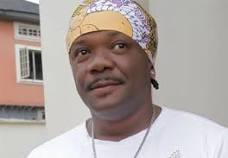
- Born: Kelvin Ngozi Ikeduba; 21 August 1976 (age 49); Ebute-Meta, Lagos State
- Occupation: Actor
- Years active: 2000–present

Kelvin Ngozi Ikeduba (born 21 August 1976) is a Nigerian actor who won the award for Best Cross Over Actor at the 2014 Yoruba Movie Academy Awards (YMAA).

Ikeduba has appeared in Nollywood films, which are commonly produced in English, as well as in Yoruba language films, produced by the Yoruba film industry in Nigeria.

== Early life ==
Although a native of Delta State, Nigeria, Ikeduba was born and raised in Ebute Metta in Lagos State. He is from a family of six—four children, two males, two females, a mother, and a father—of which he is the first-born child.

== Education ==
Ikeduba obtained both primary and secondary school education in Lagos State. He is an economics graduate from the University of Benin.

== Career ==
In an interview with Vanguard, a Nigerian print publication, Ikeduba stated that he debuted in the Nigerian movie industry in 2000. He described his start as an actor as a coincidence, as he initially only wanted to accompany a friend to an acting audition. On reaching their destination. he decided to participate in the audition, was called back, and was given a movie role.

Ikeduba's ability to understand and communicate in all three major languages spoken in Nigeria has been pivotal to his career. Ikeduba initially debuted in the English-language-only mainstream Nigerian movie industry, commonly known as Nollywood, but eventually crossed over to the Yoruba movie industry. This change came about with the help of Femi Ogedengbe, who introduced him to Saheed Balogun, who gave him a movie role in a Yoruba movie titled Omo Alhaja.

Ikeduba has been typecast in the Nigerian movie industry as a "bad boy", which he attributes to his appearance. In almost all of the movies he has featured in, Ikeduba plays the antagonist, or as the Nigerian media puts it, the "bad boy".

== Awards ==
Year	Award	Category	Film	Result	Ref
2014	Yoruba Movie Academy Awards (YMAA)	Best Cross Over Actor		Won	
2020	Best of Nollywood Awards	Best Actor in a Supporting Role (Yoruba)	Lucifer	Won	

== Personal life ==
Ikeduba is a polyglot. He speaks English, his native Igbo language, Yoruba, and Hausa.

== Filmography ==
- The Suitors (2000)
- Emotional Tears (2003) as Gigs
- Ògìdán (2004)
- More Than Gold (2005)
- Ghetto Language (2006)
- Last Dance (2006) as Dallas
- Under The Sky (2006) as Inspector
- Ghetto Queen (2007)
- Critical Truth (2008) as Emeka
- Kiss The Dust (2008) as Baba Books
- Laroda Ojo (2008) as Shola
- Mafi Wonmi (2008)
- My Darling Princess (2008) as King's thug
- Atunida Leyi (2009)
- Esin Obinrin (2009)
- Igbeyawo Arugbo (2010)
- Owowunmi (2010)
- Black Bird (2015) as Crux
- Edo Decree 1440 (2018) as Chairman
- Gold Statue (2019) as Hammer
- Lucifer (2019)
- Son of Mercy (2020) as Chairman
- Swallow (2021) as O.C.
- Battle on Buka Street (2022) as Chukwuemeka
- Maleeka (2022) as Wale
- Sibe (2023 TV Series) as kidnapper
- Lisabi: The Uprising (2024)
