= Muyiwa Ademola =

Nigerian actor, film producer and director (born 1973)

- Born: 26 January 1973 (age 53); Abeokuta, Ogun State, Nigeria
- Other name: Mr. Authentic
- Citizenship: Nigerian
- Education: University of Ibadan
- Occupations: Actor, filmmaker and film director
- Years active: 1991–present
- Notable work: Ori, Ogo Osupa, Ile, J.J, Alapadupe, Owo Okuta, Gbarada
- Spouse: Omolara Ademola
- Children: 5
- Parent: Rebecca Ademola (mother) Isiah Ademola (father)

Muyiwa Ademola (born 26 January 1973), also known as Muyiwa Authentic, is a Nigerian actor, film producer, and director. In 2005, his film ORI (Fate) won the best indigenous film at the 1st Africa Movie Academy Awards. In 2008, he was nominated for the 4th Africa Movie Academy Awards for Most Outstanding Indigenous Actor.

== Early life ==
He was born on 26 January 1971 in Abeokuta, the capital of Ogun State southwestern Nigeria. He attended St. David's High School at Molete in Ibadan where he obtained the West Africa Secondary School Certificate. He later proceeded to the University of Ibadan where he obtained a Bachelor of Education degree in adult education.

== Career ==
He joined the Nigerian film industry through Charles Olumo, popularly known as Agbako who is based in his hometown, Abeokuta. He later met a movie director called S.I Ola who taught him acting and movie production. He began his acting career fully in 1991. In 1995, he produced his first script into a movie titled Asise (Blunder). The production was sponsored by Dibel, who deals in generating sets. Since 1995, he has produced, directed and featured in several Yoruba Nollywood movies. In January 2013, it was reported that he was involved in an accident, which almost resulted in his death.

== Personal life ==
Ademola married a woman named Omolara Ademola on 23 June 2006, and they have three children together. He also has a set of twins outside wedlock, which makes him a father to five children. His wife and all his children live in Toronto, Canada.

== Selected filmography ==
- Asise (1995)
- Ogo Osupa

•Iyonu Olorun

- Ori (2004)
- Ija Okan (2006)
- Igi Owo (2007)
- Igba Ewa (2008)
- Ise Imole (2009)
- Ogun Aiku (2010)
- Jelili (2011)
- Emi Abata (2012)
- Omo Elemosho (2013)
- Asife (2016)
- Alapadupe
- Ami Ayo
- Fimidara Ire
- Kesari (2018)
- Gbarada (2019)
- Iranse Aje
- J.J.
- Ajebiden (2020)
- Prophetess (2021)
- Olugbeja Olorun (2021)
- Ajindo (2021)
- The Ghost and the Tout Too (2021)
- Ago Alaago (2021)
- Unseen Trap (2022)
- Jagun Jagun (2023)
- Malaika (2023)
- Seven Doors (2024)
- Reel Love (2024)

== See also ==
- 4th Africa Movie Academy Awards
- List of Yoruba people
- List of Nigerian actors
