= Diiche =

Nigerian television series

- Genre: Thriller; Drama
- Created by: Ifeanyi Barbara Chidi
- Directed by: James Omokwe; Tolu Ajayi; Fiyin Gambo; Ifeoma Chukwuogo
- Starring: Daniel K Daniel; Efa Iwara; Uzoamaka Onuoha; Frank Konwea; Uzoamaka Aniunoh; Kalu Ikeagwu; Chinyere Wilfred; Gloria Anozie-Young
- Country of origin: Nigeria
- Original languages: English; Igbo; Yoruba
- No. of series: 1
- No. of episodes: 6

Production
- Executive producer: James Omokwe
- Running time: 39-59 minutes
- Production company: Feemo

Original release
- Network: Showmax
- Release: 29 September – 3 November 2022

Diiche is a 2022 Nigerian Showmax thriller television series directed by James Omokwe, and co-directed by Tolu Ajayi, Fiyin Gambo, and Ifeoma Chukwuogo. Regarded as the first Nigerian Showmax TV series, the film stars Daniel K Daniel, Efa Iwara, Uzoamaka Onuoha, Frank Konwea, Uzoamaka Aniunoh, Kalu Ikeagwu, Chinyere Wilfred, and Gloria Anozie-Young.

== Plot ==
Diiche lay emphasis on the soon-to-be-married celebrity couples, in connection to the death of Odiiche's, fiancé Nnamdi, at their engagement party on a private beach, which springs up the storyline of who killed Nnamdi?. Making Odiiche, the prime suspect in the murder investigation over the death of Nnamdi, her fiancé. In the search for Nnamdi's killer, Jimi, and Ichie G Money was tied to the crime, as well as Kesaandu.

The backstory about the series is that all suspects in Diiche, are either rich or famous enough to buy their way out.

== Cast ==
All cast on Diiche credit adapted from The Netng;

=== Main ===
- Uzoamaka Onuoha as Odiiche Anyanwu (simply. Diiche)
- Daniel K Daniel as Nnamdi Nwokeji (simply. Nnamdi)
- Efa Iwara as Folajimi Gbajumo (simply. Jimi or Jimmy)
- Frank Konwea as Inspector Dipo Kazeem (simply. Inspector Dipo)
- Uzoamaka Aniunoh as Inspector Ijeoma Anene (simply. Inspector Ijeoma)
- Kalu Ikeagwu as Ichie G Money (simply. G Money)
- Chinyere Wilfred as Kesaandu Anyanwu (simply. Diiche's mother)
- Gloria Anozie-Young as Adaure Nwokeji (simply. Nnamdi's mother)

=== Recurring ===
- Amarachukwu Onoh as Afam Anyanwu (simply. Diiche's father)
- Tracey George as Kesaandu Anyanwu (simply. Diiche's mother)

== Episodes ==
Each episode was released weekly for six weeks, every Thursday on Showmax from 29 September to 3 November 2022.

Series	Episodes	Originally released
1	6	29 September 2022

=== Season 1 (2022) ===
No.	Title	Original release date
1	"Who Killed Nnamdi?"	29 September 2022
Nnamdi Nwokeji is found dead at the beach house of his own party. At the venue we meet the inspectors, Kazeem and Anene, who were investigating the murder case.
2	"Did Jimmy kill Nnamdi?"	6 October 2022
Inspector Anene was knocked off at the beach during her investigation at midnight, by the man in the hoodie. Odiiche suffers from a nightmare and thalassophobia, as Adaure storms social media, and tags Kesaandu and her daughter, Odiiche, her son's killer. G Money was called in for questioning by inspector Kazeem as he tries to bribe the inspector, he was politely taken to the station. Jimmy received a call, took off to the office for some documents, and was approached by inspector Kazeem, as he got into his car.
3	"Is Diiche Anyanwu a witch?"	13 October 2022
Jimmy was arrested and accompanied by the inspectors to the police station in handcuffs after he tried to run off. In the station, he sees Diiche, as he arrives with the police officers. Meanwhile, Odiiche came to report about the man in the hoodie who tried to break into her car. Jimmy asked about Odiiche, while Odiiche does likewise. Inspector Kazeem think about their mutual concern for each other, which sparks up the question "Who is Jimmy closer to?"; he asked Odiiche.
4	"Did Diiche's mum pay Nnamdi to marry her daughter?"	20 October 2022
Jimmy opened up to the inspectors, on his recent findings on Nnamdi and G-Money, in business for years and faking his signature on all their deals, which triggered his emotion to runoff with the documents, he was arrested with. Jimmy, who's in partnership with Nnamdi, was in a mess for trying to run away from the police. He had no idea, Nnamdi and Odiiche's manager Esosa were secret lovers. Esosa tells the inspector of their plan to run off with the 50 million Naira, which Odiiche's mum gave Nnamdi to marry Odiiche.
5	"A child from the gods"	27 October 2022
Kesaandu was mocked by Afam's family for having six miscarriages and brought in a new wife for Odiiche's father to marry, but he disagreed with their decision and chased them away, with their new wife. Kesaandu couldn't bear the shame of being barren, as Afam pitched in the idea of adopting a child while waiting for a miracle child. Kesaandu self-consciously made a decision to consult the King of water "Ezenwanyi", for a child, but she had to lose someone she loves to gain something she always wanted.
6	"We have found Nnamdi's killer!"	3 November 2022
The goddess Ala, gave Kesaandu twins. Ezenwanyi the messenger of the goddess, appeared to Kesaandu and took back one of the twins called Chidi. On the night Nnamdi was murdered at the beach, in the previous episode, Ezenwanyi had told Kesaandu, never to allow Odiiche to go close to the water that connects back to Ala. Odiiche returned back from the water strange and different, leaving Nnamdi confused about who he was communicating with. The question now is, did Odiiche or Chidi murder Nnamdi that night?

== Production ==
The television series was produced by Feemo Vision Limited and distributed by Showmax. On 6 September 2022, the official trailer was released on Showmax YouTube channel.

== Premiere and release ==
On 27 September 2022, Showmax (trademarked as. A Showmax Original Series) hosted an exclusive screening of the first episode of the series in Victoria Island, Lagos. The event host was Chigul, and in attendance were its cast Uzoamaka Onuoha, Chinyere Wilfred, Gloria Anozie-Young, Frank Konwea, and Uzoamaka Aniunoh, alongside the show executive producer, James Omokwe and co-directors, Fiyin Gambo and Ifeoma Chukwuogo, and the creator of the series Ifeanyi Barbara Chidi were present at the event.

== Reception ==
=== Critical reception ===
Professional ratings
Review scores
Source	Rating
Premium Times	8/10

Diiche has received favourable reviews from critics. According to Guardian Saturday Magazine writer Dika Ofoma, he noted that Diiche seems geared towards tracing itself back to its root, towards finding its originality, to what made it so loved in the first place, and how it was able to make its mark in the film world despite technical challenges. Before the advent of fancy cameras and gears". On 4 November 2022, social media critics praised the final episode of the series, as the suspect of Nnamdi's killer was finally reviewed. Reviewing for Premium Times, Shola-Adido Oladotun said "Diiche was a series that left a great first impression and left viewers on the edge of their seats with every episode". YNaija called the movie a thrilling foray into motives for murder, ogbanje tradition and modern psychology.

== Awards and nominations ==
Year	Award	Category	Recipient	Result	Ref
2023	Africa Magic Viewers' Choice Awards	Best Art Director	Uche Nwaohiri & Tunde Lawal	Nominated	
2023	Africa Magic Viewers' Choice Awards	Best Lighting Designer	Francis Wanyahdeh & Ebuka Enejere	Nominated	
2023	Africa Magic Viewers' Choice Awards	Best Picture Editor	Banjo Onyekachi, Winston Aig-Ohioma, Oluwaseun Adeosun	Nominated	
2023	Africa Magic Viewers' Choice Awards	Best Writer	Sodi Kurubo, Stephanie Dadet & Victor Aghahowa	Nominated	
2023	Africa Magic Viewers' Choice Awards	Best Cinematographer	Charles Oleghe	Nominated	
2023	Africa Magic Viewers' Choice Awards	Best Television Series	James Omokwe	Nominated	
2023	Africa Magic Viewers' Choice Awards	Best Director	Tolu Ajayi, Fiyin Gambo, Ifeoma Chukwuogo & James Omokwe	Nominated	
