= Flawsome =

Nigerian drama series

- Genre: Drama
- Created by: Tola Odunsi
- Directed by: Tola Odunsi
- Starring: Enado Odigie; Bisola Aiyeola; Sharon Ooja; Ini Dima-Okojie
- Country of origin: Nigeria
- Original language: English
- No. of series: 2
- No. of episodes: 24

Production
- Running time: 45-48 minutes
- Production company: Urban Vision

Original release
- Network: Showmax
- Release: 10 November 2022

Flawsome is a 2022 Nigerian Showmax Original drama series created and directed by Tola Odunsi. It stars Enado Odigie, Bisola Aiyeola, Sharon Ooja, Gabriel Afolayan, Iretiola Doyle, Baaj Adebule, Shine Rosman, and Shawn Fuqua.

== Plot ==
Flawsome revolves around the lives of four women: Ifeyinwa, Ramat, Ivie, and Dolapo. The series highlights their personal and professional lives, which are bounded by their flaws, and yet the unbreakable ties they share as friends.

Ifeyinwa expected to become CEO of her father's company following his death, but learned she was not his chosen candidate. Ramat has a middle-class lifestyle, a marriage, and a career, though faces challenges. Ivie left her work as a pharmacologist and surgeon to pursue a career in fashion design. Dolapo works in business and manages prominent clients in her portfolio.

== Cast ==
=== Main ===
- Ini Dima-Okojie as Rahmat Ekong
- Helen Enado Odigie as Dolapo Mankinde
- Bisola Aiyeola as Ifeyinwa Okoro
- Sharon Ooja as Ivie Oromoni

=== Supporting ===
- Gabriel Afolayan as Ranti
- Iretiola Doyle as Dr Elizabeth
- Baaj Adebule as Uduak Ekong
- Sunshine Rosman as Sarah
- Shawn Faqua as Folarin
- Titi Kuti as Poju
- Toyin Abraham as Madam Rose
- Ali Nuhu as Senator Jubril
- Okey Uzoeshi as Timi Douglas
- Joselyn Dumas as Stella Jubril
- Femi Branch as Smart
- Gloria Young as Ngozi Okoro
- Babalwa Mneno as Lerato
- Eso Dike as Godspower
- John Dumelo as Tersei
- Segun Olusemo as Abel
- Melvin Oduah as Clark
- Pearl Waturuocha as Eve
- Violet Ejiata as Dora
- Ashionye Raccah as Celia
- Fred Amata as Dr Robert
- William Benson as Inspector Kazeem
- Abel Alechenu as Haruna
- Destiny Amaka as Olumide
- Xaxa Oyofo as Sika
- Olasope Ola as Eku
- Oge Amuta as Catherina
- Tina Mba as Mrs Mel
- Norbert Young as Augustin
- Morgan Mnwamba as Bobo
- Olorunfemi Precious as Simi
- Ubong Umoessien as Celine
- Chris Attoh as Uch
- Moyinoluwa Olutayo as Mama Dolapo
- Ugonna Ibe as Eyimofe
- Nimi Adekanbi as Tina
- Mena Sodje as Sedi
- Uzoamaka Onuoha as Diamond 2
- Augustine Nonyelu K as Paul
- David Harvey as Agent Mustapha
- Kiitan Bukola as Jane
- Barbara Aduba as Ijay
- Maryann Amakor as Natong

== Episodes ==
Each episode was released weekly over thirteen weeks, every Thursday on Showmax, from 10 November 2022 to 2 February 2023.

Season	Episodes	Originally released	
Season	Episodes	First released	Last released
1	13	November 10, 2022	February 2, 2023
2	13	February 9, 2024	April 18, 2024

=== Season 1 (2022-2023) ===
No.	Title	Original release date
1	"Meet the Girls"	10 November 2022
Ivie, Dolapo, Ifeyinwa, and Ramat are BFFs for life. Ivie is trying to make it in fashion, while Dolapo is a big-shot PR expert. Ifeyinwa is hoping to become CEO, while Ramat runs an NGO for women and children. A victim visited Rahmat Ekong, at her office to beg for help. She was led into sex trafficking, with a promise of a better life in Lagos, where she is forced to do prostitution, sleeping with numerous men daily, even when she is tired. Ekong’s husband thinks the girl is a junkie who is not worth the hassle, but she disagrees and goes on a dangerous rescue mission. At night time, the ladies assemble together at a lounge to discuss their day, the highs and lows in Lagos.
2	"Victory, revenge and betrayal"	17 November 2022
Dolapo reaps the benefits of her victory. Ivie battles with her new role at work. Ramat is rescued from her situation and longs to avenge herself. Ifeyinwa feels betrayed and she is filled with rage. Ramat was arrested and the police won’t allow her husband to see her. Ramat’s offense is trying to take down Madam Rose’s human trafficking venture all by herself, an honourable but naïve move. Dolapo goes to rescue her, with the help of a client. Dolapo arrived at work only to see Ifeyinwa missed out on the CEO position. After a chat with the other girls on the matter, she visits Ifeyinwa, who is at home with her mother, where Ifeyinwa's mother initiated the conversation on marriage and men, with her daughter and Dolapo, who eventually leaves the conversation when the heat became uncomfortable. Dolapo is left to deal with the rest of the conversation. As Ivie is also experiencing men drama as she encounters Tersei’s ex-wife at his daughter’s birthday party and gets some excellent advice on men.
3	"All Hands on Deck"	24 November 2022
Ivie needs to make a decision regarding her love life. Ramat tries to spice things up with Udauk. Dolapo plays the fixer in everyone's lives and gets distracted from work. Ifeyinwa has to deal with her mother, and meets someone new. Abel a rich and famous music video director managed by Dolapo has somehow managed to prevent Ramat and her friends from seeing Eve at the hospital they lodged her. Dora realized she was being played, she unleashed her anger through Ranti. As Dolapo fells in love with a married man, her boss’s husband. As Dora leaves, Dolapo catches Ramat’s husband meeting with his ex.
4	"Pick a Side"	1 December 2022
Ivie finds herself in a horrific position. Ramat is at war with a celebrity that tries to tarnish her name. Dolapo is caught up between saving her client or her friendship. Ifeyinwa gets an offer she can't refuse. Poju’s gambling addiction has finally caught up with him. The one million Naira he borrowed to gamble is due and the creditor wants his money. They beat him up, demanding Ivie pay them before they release him. But she is an intern and can’t afford to. As she tries fixing her client's reputation. Dolapo advises Ramat not to let emotions cloud her judgment while suggesting Eve could be lying. The final straw for Ramat was Dolapo pushing the innocent until proven guilty stance in defense of Abel.
5	"When It Rains, It Pours"	8 December 2022
Ranti is out of blood and Dolapo tries to help him out. Ramat will not back down from the fight. Ifeyinwa's relationship with her mother is still in the trenches. Ivie gets rejected and is constantly reminded of her failures. Dolapo came with some peace offering, with her plans to deal with Abel, as she ordered Sarah by the side to meet with Eve and get all the necessary information. Apparently, this isn’t the first time Abel is raping Eve; she had filed a police report and presented evidence, but they conveniently dropped the case for being a he-said-she-said matter. But Dolapo, through Sarah, has gotten Eve’s trust, who will file charges and testify against Abel in court. And Dolapo will be supporting her PR skills, clout and network. But there is still the little matter of Ranti’s words, being cooked up, while Dolapo is jetting out to the Maldives to relax and clear her head.
6	"Trust Your Instincts"	15 December 2022
Ivie receives shocking news from Lerato. Dolapo has a bad feeling about her new client. Ifeyinwa reluctantly spills the beans. Ramat is on a mission all by herself. Dolapo continues her redemptive journey. First, she has gone against Abel, backing Ramat over her client. Everything Ranti said to her seemed to have struck a chord. Dolapo is also offering her services for free to Dr. Smart, the self-made billionaire whose foundation helps poor kids in rural areas. He is organizing a non-profit fundraiser and having read about his charity, she is willing to help for free. It doesn’t sound like the capitalist Dolapo we have come to know. However, her good deeds are being repaid with disrespect from a man who thinks she finds him attractive. Dolapo shouted at the senator, who hasn’t even called a doctor because he doesn’t want this to go out. She rebukes him.
7	"There's Light at the End of the Tunnel"	22 December 2022
Dolapo is given a good seat on her clients table. Ramat finds a new lead, while her life at home continues to crumble. Ivie keeps her head up and finds her own way to make her dreams come true. Ifeyinwa refuses to take an offer. Madam Rose and Ramat’s griefs, Ivie and Dolapo are glowing. Tersei is charming Ivie and gives her everything she’s asked for in a man while Dolapo, still on her saving journey, is being swooned over by a dashing young man. The reverse is the case for Ifeyinwa, our tech sis isn’t having a good time. She must sell her father’s debt-ridden company, but she worries about her family’s legacy and their staff being laid off. She makes an emotional but moral decision.
8	"Love and War"	29 December 2022
Things get heated between Ifeyinwa and Timi. Dolapo has unexpected guests while she and Damain bond over similar backgrounds. Tersei makes a suggestion to Ivie regarding her past. Ramat experiences an embarrassing moment at an event.
9	"The Blame Game"	5 January 2023
Uduak blames Ramat for their lack of intimacy in their marriage. Ifeyinwa makes a move on her newest interest while she unintentionally neglects her mom. Dolapo focuses more on her work than her relationship. Lerato steals Ivie's designs.
10	"Bed of Lies"	12 January 2023
Ivie and Ramat work together to set up a workshop. Uduak lies to Ramat about his problems. Tersei continues to be Ivie's place of comfort. Dolapo fights with sister-in-law. Ifeyinwa gets the shock of her life.
11	"Mask Off"	19 January 2023
Ifeyinwa gets an ultimatum by her mother. Ramat forms friendship with Godpower. Dolapo receives shocking information about her new client. Poju does right by Ivie. Meanwhile, Clark's true identity is revealed.
12	"Trouble in Paradise"	26 January 2023
Ifeyinwa is left astray. Ramat's guilt drives her out of her matrimonial home. Ranti is back and is ready to bring Dolapo down by any means necessary. Ivie bonds with her sister as life starts to brighten up for her.
13	"Too Late for Validation"	2 February 2023
Ifeyinwa has finally gotten her mother's approval, however it's too late to make amends. Ramat is ready to fix things with Uduak but he is on a different path. Dolapo is urged to step down from her new role. Ivie strives in her new path.

=== Season 2 (2024) ===
No.	Title	Original release date
1	TBA	9 February 2024
Dolapo is determined to find her missing brother, and Ramat is determined to mend her marriage. Ifeyinwa grapples with the loss of her mother, and Ivie revels in the success of her debut showing.
2	TBA	15 February 2024
Dolapo secures an amazing opportunity at work. Ramat's drive to repair her marriage has no bounds. An intoxicated Ifeyinwa encounters a ghost, and Ivie deals with her sister's decision to relocate.
3	TBA	22 February 2024
Ivie defends her business against the backlash, Ifeyinwa focuses on preserving her family's legacy, Ramat takes on a new client dealing with domestic abuse, and Dolapo dives deep into her work with a new client.
4	TBA	29 February 2024
While Dolapo continues her search for her missing brother, she's met with an unexpected and shocking surprise. Ramat's client makes a surprising choice. Ivie faces blame for her sister's relocation.
5	TBA	7 March 2024
Dolapo's houseguest proves unbearable. Ramat deals with a micromanaging partner. Timi's games and manipulations cause work strain for Ifeyinwal. Ivie concentrates on her business and designs.
6	TBA	14 March 2024
Ifeyinwa has some well-deserved fun. Dolapo's celebrity client becomes embroiled in scandal. Ivie receives a crash course in business management. Uduak experiences jealousy.
7	TBA	21 March 2024
Ramat and Uduak's attempts at intimacy don't go well. Ifeyinwa navigates the aftermath of Timi's attempt to undermine her with the board. Ivie explores her romantic life. Dolapo's emotions become complicated.
8	TBA	28 March 2024
Centred around four female friends and how they navigate their lives, Flawsome is a tale of friendship, women's experiences, and a patriarchal society.
9	TBA	4 April 2024
10	TBA	11 April 2024
11	TBA	18 April 2024

== Production and release ==
The series was created and directed by Tola Odunsi, the 13-part drama series. Flawsome was set in Lagos and released on Showmax on 10 November 2022, with the official premiere being held at the Africa International Film Festival on 11 November 2022. The AFRIFF was hosted by Miz Vick, and in attendance were the movie director, Tola Odunsi, and members of the cast, including Enado Odigie, Bisola Aiyeola, Sharon Ooja, Gabriel Afolayan, Iretiola Doyle, Baaj Adebule, Shine Rosman and Shawn Fuqua. During the occasion, the series director, Odunsi, said, “Showmax is made for Africans, and everything we produce is geared to suit the audience. Most women can relate to the stories in the series.”

The series director Tola Odunsi also said “I feel lost for words. I am happy that everyone is finally seeing this beautiful work we have released. Women face several challenges, and we wanted to tell a deeper story that explores these issues.” Busola Tejumola, the Executive Head of Content & West Africa Channels from MultiChoice Group, said, “Flawsome is a true depiction of our culture, society, people, and the very intricate availability of the show. I’m very confident our viewers would enjoy it.” On 8 June 2023, Showmax renewed the series for a second season, and named Dami Elebe as head writer of the season. On 22 January 2024, showmax released the official trailer for season 2.

== Awards and nominations ==
Year	Award	Category	Recipient	Result	Ref
2023	Africa Magic Viewers' Choice Awards	Best Actress In A Drama, Movie Or TV Series	Ini-Dima Okojie	Nominated	
2023	Africa Magic Viewers' Choice Awards	Best Actress In A Drama, Movie Or TV Series	Enado Odigie	Nominated	
2023	Africa Magic Viewers' Choice Awards	Best Lighting Designer	Segun Adeleke	Nominated	
2023	Africa Magic Viewers' Choice Awards	Best Cinematographer	Idowu Adedapo (Mr Views)	Nominated	
2023	Africa Magic Viewers' Choice Awards	Best Television Series	Tola Odunsi and Akin Akinkugbe	Nominated	
