= 2023 Africa Magic Viewers' Choice Awards =

9th Africa Magic Viewers' Choice Awards
- Date: 20 May 2023

Highlights
- Most nominations: Aníkúlápó

The 2023 Africa Magic Viewers' Choice Awards was held between 18 and 20 May 2023. The event included a series of pre-show activities with the actual award show held on 20 May 2023.

The nominees were revealed by actors Bisola Aiyeola, Adjetey Anang, Jasmine Olarotimi and Nifemi Lawal on 16 April 2023 in a ceremony. A total of 12 categories were open to public voting, while the other 21 categories were decided by a panel of judges headed by Femi Odugbemi. The most nominations were earned by Kunle Afolayan's epic film, Anikulapo.

The winner of the Best Soundtrack category won a ₦1 million prize.

== Awards ==
Winners are listed highlighted in boldface

Best Actress In A Comedy/TV Series	Best Actor In A Comedy Drama, Movie Or TV Series
Battle on Buka Street – Mercy Johnson; Battle on Buka Street – Funke Akindele; Passport – Mercy Johnson; **Selina** – **Bimbo Ademoye**; Visa on Arrival – Albert Oluwatoyin; Married to Work – Grace Wacuka	The Razz Guy – Nosa Afolabi; **Inside Life – Samuel Perry 'Broda Shaggi'**; Unintentional – Kunle Idowu; Inside Life – Adokiye Horsfall 'Romeo_WJ'; Battle on Buka Street – Nkem Owoh; Survivors – Samuel Perry 'Broda Shaggi'; Just Friends – Charles Etubiebi; City Hustler – Charles Inojie; Aki and Pawpaw – Chinedu Ikedieze; Inside Life – Nedu Ani (Nedu Wazobia)
Best Supporting Actress	Best Supporting Actor
On Your Own – Ivie Okujaye; Brotherhood – Toni Tones; Anikulapo – Sola Sobowale; Love in a Pandemic – Teniola Aladese; **Four Four Forty Four – Efe Irele**; Kofa – Gina Castel	County 49 – James Webbo; Anikulapo – Yinka Quadri; The Razz Guy – Bucci Franklin; Anikulapo – Taiwo Hassan; Brotherhood – OC Ukeje; **Gacal – Abdisattar Ahmed**; Bedroom Chains – Jeffroberts Walusimbi
Best Actress In A Drama, Movie Or TV Series	Best Actor In A Drama, Movie Or TV Series
Anikulapo – Bimbo Ademoye; Flawsome – Ini Dima-Okojie; Ile Owo – Immaculata Oko Kasum; **Man of God** – **Osas Ighodaro**; Flawsome – Enado Odigie; The Planter's Plantation – Nimo Loveline; Strained – Queen Nwokoye; Shanty Town – Nse Ikpe-Etim; Shanty Town – Ini Edo; Wura – Scarlet Gomez	Shanty Town – Chidi Mokeme; The Trade – Blossom Chukwujekwu; All the Colours of the World Are Between Black and White – Tope Tedela; King of Thieves (Agesinkole) – Femi Adebayo; Black Mail – O.C. Ukeje; Tembele – Nkakalukanyi Patriq; Kofa – Daniel Etim-Effiong; Choke – Chimezie Imo; **Brotherhood – Tobi Bakre**; Four Four Forty Four – Richard Mofe Damijo
Best Short Film or Online Video	Best Indigenous Language – Yoruba
Teju's Tale – Teniola Zara King; The Song Maiden – Nkem Nwaturuocha; Sixteen Rounds – Usama Mukwaya, Loukman Ali; Away – Victor Onwudiwe & Goodnews Erico Isika; **Pa Aromire – Adeoye Adetunji**; Convictus – Gbenga Salu; Love Language – Uzoamaka Aniunoh	**Anikulapo' – Kunle Afolayan**; Ogeere Ololade – Tijani-Ebong; Abebi Seranko Seniyan – Funmi Bank Anthony & Abdullahi Abdulrasaq; Mr Raji – Okusanya Bayonle Samson; Morenikeji – Karamot Adeboye
Best Indigenous Language – Hausa	Best Indigenous Language – Igbo
**Aisha – Abubakar Bashir Maishadda**; Kwana Casa'In – Evans Ejiogu; Lulu Da A – Ty Shaban; Guzama – Nancy Yiljep	Ifediche – Brown Ene, Victor Onwudiwe & Ben Cassie; The Bride Price (Imego) – Trinity Ugonabo; **Uhuruchi – Victor Iyke**; Ijeoma – Shileola A. Ibironke; Ego Mbute – Shileola A. Ibironke
Best Indigenous Language – Swahili	Best Art Director
Safari – Phoebe Ruguru & Njue Kevin; Barakatatu – Malcom Hamisi; **Click Click Bang – Philip Karanja Njenga**; Frida – Wilson Nkya & Jane Moshi; Mpiganaji – Daniel Manege; Dau – Freddy Feruzi; Mvanmizi (The Intruder) – Wilson Nkya	Brotherhood – Olugbenga Ogunshina and Joy Kadiri; Crime & Justice – Pat Nebo & Temple Chima Adighije; **King of Thieves (Agesinkole) – Wale Adeleke**; Battle on Buka Street – Olatunji Afolayan; Shanty Town – Olalekan Isiaka; Almajiri – Toka Mcbaror; Diiche – Uche Nwaohiri & Tunde Lawal
Best Costume Designer	Best Lighting Designer
Four Four Forty Four – Millicent Jack; Brotherhood – Ezugworie Franca; Man of God – Bolanle Austen-Peters, Clement Effanga, Juliana Dede; Anikulapo – Toyin Ogundeji; **The Real Housewives of Lagos Reunion Episode – Adeola Art-Alade**; Shanty Town – Bunmi Fashina, Tiannah Empire & Secrets of April; Nnewi the Land of Gold – Kingsley Okoye Rex	Crime & Justice – Francis Wanyahdeh; **Brotherhood** – **Mathew Yusuf**; Anikulapo – Lanre Omofaiye; Shanty Town – Walter Odhiambo; Ile Owo – Ismail Adewunmi; Four Four Forty Four – Muri Salami; Diiche – Francis Wanyahdeh & Ebuka Enejere; Real Housewives of Lagos – Renaldo Van Den Berg, Emmanuel Patrick, David Otuokere; Tarella – Godwin Lawal; Flawsome – Segun Adeleke
Best Picture Editor	Best Sound Editor
Brotherhood – Martini Akande; **Crime & Justice – Holmes Awa & Daniel Tom**; Anikulapo – Temitope Folarin; Ile Owo – Adio Solanke; King of Thieves (Agesinkole) – Sanjo Adegoke; Tembele – Kimera Paul; Diiche – Banjo Onyekachi, Winston Aig-Ohioma, Oluwaseun Adeosun; Ijakumo the Born Again Stripper – Steve Sodiya; Battle on Buka Street – Valentine Chukwuma	Shanty Town – Kolade Kayode Morakinyo; Ile Owo – Dare Olaitan & Adio Solanke; Battle on Buka Street – Kolade Morakinyo & Pius Fatoke; Black Mail – Shiloh Godson; **Anikulapo – Anu Afolayan**; Ijakumo the Born Again Stripper – Kazeem Agboola; Obara' M – Q Rodney Abia, Angelo Anosike & Kayode Kasum; Bedroom Chains – Ismail Kyobe Ssebowa; The Set Up 2 – Grey Jones; Click Click Bang – Fredrick Karumba; L.I.F.E – Abiola Olayinka, Gomez Tito and Tolu Obanro
Best Sound Track	Best Make Up
**Anikulapo – Kent Edunjobi**; King of Thieves (Agesinkole) – Adam Songbird & Tolu Obanro; Shanty Town – Jaysynths & Hotkid; Black Mail – Joel Christian Goffin; Battle on Buka Street – Gbas Gbos by Tolu Obanro & Adam Songbird; Obara' M – Q Rodney Abia, Angelo Anosike & Kayode Kasum; L.I.F.E. – Abiola Olayinka, Gomez Tito and Tolu Obanro	Anikulapo – Hakeem Effects Onilogbo; **Shanty Town – Maryam Ndukwe & Hakeem Effects Onilogbo**; King of Thieves (Agesinkole) – Francisca Otaigbe; The Trade – Carina SFX; Tarella – Sandra Oyiana-Ogbeni; Ile Owo – Feyzo Artistry; Battle on Buka Street – Hakeem Effects Onilogbo & Jemila Sedik
Best Writer	Best Cinematographer
The Trade – Jade Osiberu; Kanaani – Tunde Apalowo & Jeffery Musa David; Diiche (Episode 5) – Sodi Kurubo, Stephanie Dadet & Victor Aghahowa; Battle on Buka Street – Funke Akindele, Jack'enneth Opukeme, Stephen Oluboyo & Jemine Edukugho; King of Thieves (Agesinkole) – Yinka Laoye; Choke – Uche Ateli; **Anikulapo – Sola Dada**	Crime & Justice – Yinka Edward; Tembele – Ekuka Ishaq; Shanty Town – Jonathan Kovel; **Brotherhood** – **Loukman Ali**; Diiche – Charles Oleghe; Ijakumo the Born Again Stripper – Idowu Adedapo; The Real Housewives of Lagos – Mex Ossai, Philip Okpokoro, Esmond Igho, KC Obiajulu & Goke Oyerinde; Anikulapo – Jonathan Kovel; Flawsome – Idowu Adedapo (Mr Views); Jolly Roger – Paul Gambit
Best Movie Southern Africa	Best Movie East Africa
Silver Lining – Emmanuel Mwape; **Jewel – Elvis Chucks**; Ke Bona Spoko – Leburugraphy	**Click Click Bang – Philip Karanja Njenga**; Karamoja – Eleanor Nwabiso; Bedroom Chains – Hassan Mageye; Baba Twins – Lucy Mwangi; Married to Work – Nadira Shakur; Dial M For Maya – Gashumba Emmanuel; Tembele – Mugisha Herbert Morris; Gacal – Omar Hamza; Mvamizi (The Intruder) – Wilson Nkya & Philipo Ngonyani; Frida – Wilson Nkya & Jane Moshi
Best Movie West Africa	Best Overall Movie
Four Four Forty Four – Winifred Mena Ajakpovi; Anikulapo – Kunle Afolayan; Kanaani – Rent-A-Studio & Native Media TV; Obara' M – Kayode Kasum; Choke – Chris Odeh; **Brotherhood – Jade Osiberu**; Red Carpet – Samira Yakubu	**Anikulapo – Kunle Afolayan**; Battle on Buka Street – Funke Akindele; Brotherhood – Jade Osiberu; King of Thieves (Agesinkole) – Femi Adebayo; Four Four Forty Four – Winfred Mena-Ajakpovi; Ile Owo – Kayode Kasum; Tembele – Mugisha Herbet Morris
Best Television Series	The Multichoice Talent Factory
**Crime & Justice – Yinka Edward**; Diiche – James Omokwe; The Plan – Dimbo Atiya, Rahama Sadau, Safina Mellisa; When are we getting married – Ife Olujuyigbe, Kayode Kasum; Visa on Arrival (Season 1) – Bovi Ugboma, Ann Obaseki; The Real Housewives of Lagos – Adeola Art-Alade & Dare Art Alade; Single Kiasi – Grace Kahaki & Philippe Bresson; Flawsome – Tola Odunsi & Akin Akinkugbe; County 49 – Millicent Ogutu; Game On (Season 2) –Vincent Nwachukwu	**Leaked**; Revisit; Stinger; Cheza; A Quiet Intruder; Strings
Best Director	Best Documentary
Black Mail – Obi Emelonye; Anikulapo – Kunle Afolayan; All the Colours of the World Are Between Black and White – Babatunde Apalowo; **Brotherhood – Loukman Ali**; Shanty Town – Dimeji Ajibola; Tembele – Mugisha Herbert Morris; King of Thieves (Agesinkole) – Adebayo Tijani & Tope Adebayo; The Trade – Jade Osiberu; Man of God – Bolanle Austen-Peters; Diiche – Tolu Ajayi, Fiyin Gambo, Ifeoma Chukwuogo & James Omokwe	Awaiting Trial – Chude Jideowo; 100 of Us – Best Okoduwa; Truck Blind Spot – Nathaniel George; Green: The Amazons – Charles F. Solomon, Oluchi Nsofor, Aaron Olayemi & Famous Odion; **Nigeria: The Debut – Nora Awolowo**; Way to the Top – Charles F. Solomon; Baby Blues – Nora Awolowo
Best Online Social Content Creator	Best Original Drama Series
Nollywood Epic Love Story Parody (The Finale) – Tee Kuro; Husband’s Side Chick – Steve Chuks; My Sweet Mother Inlaw – Isbae U; VIP Bathroom – Cute Abiola; **Back From the Future** – **Elozonam & Kiekie**; Quick Pronunciations – Kenzy Udosen; Soldiers at War (Compilation) – Oluwadolarz & Abayomi Alvin; The Activist – Edem Victor; Fake Alert with Mercy Johnson – Adeaga Bukunmi; Iya Barakat Teropi Secxxion – Bimbo Ademoye	Unmarried; **Ricordi**; The Rishantes; To Have and to Hold; Accra Medic; Dirty Laundry; Njila; Pete; Junior Drama Club; A Infiltrada; Pazia
Best Original Comedy Series	Best Unscripted Original
Flatmates; The Johnsons; My Siblings and I; Co-Habits; RSM; Uncle Limbani; Mussulando; **Njoro Wa Uba**; Popi; The Return of Original Comedy	Come Play Naija; Off-Air with Gbemi & Toolz; Judging Matters; Rock that Aisle Again; Sankofa; Kan-See-Me; **King Bugar**
Best Original Telenovela	
Itura; Covenant; Huba; Dede; Prestige; Salem; Mahinga; **Mpali**; Maida	
