= Nini (2025 film) =

2025 film by Samuel Idiagbonya

- Directed by: Samuel Idiagbonya
- Written by: Samuel Idiagbonya
- Produced by: Samuel Idiagbonya
- Starring: Keppy Ekpenyong; Antar Laniyan; Jide Kosoko; Tina Mba; Chinyere Wilfred; Yemi Blaq; Chimezie Imo; Mariah Ugbashi; Patricia Okwusor; Osaheni Pius-Usiobaifo; Damilola Ogunsi; Maryann Apollo; Energy Uloko; Francis Duru
- Cinematography: Ochuko Justin Thomas
- Edited by: Ochuko Justin Thomas
- Music by: Angel Sings; Miki Studio - SoundIT Entertainment; Layor Akewi - AK Studio; Frank De Tenor; TOR Studio
- Production company: Fedmas Studios
- Distributed by: Tribe Nation Theatrical Distribution
- Release date: October 3, 2025
- Running time: 117 minutes
- Country: Nigeria
- Languages: English; Yoruba; Igbo; Nigerian Pidgin
- Budget: Approx. ₦100 million

Nini is a 2025 Nigerian action drama film written, produced, and directed by Sam Idiagbonya (DGN). Originally titled Albeit, it is a contemporary African family adventure story centered on the conflict arising from a mother's sanctimonious perspective on celibacy and purity.

The 117-minute film was shot in Abuja and Nasarawa State. It is set against the backdrop of a community where love and betrayal walk hand in hand. It tells the story of a young girl whose life's journey was detoured by decisions not of her own making. "When an unexpected event punctuates an unfolding nuptial bliss, an innocent young lady faces her mother's sanctimonious belief with a scheme that leads to unforeseen lessons" - a celibate daughter intending to wed finds herself pregnant, and a series of familiar and relationship strife begins to occur. Her lot worsens still when she runs away from home, assaulted, kidnapped, and at the mercy of a notorious criminal thug. In this thrilling story of twists and turns, all are forced to re-evaluate their relationships and judge what love and purity really mean.

The pre-production and story development began in June 2023, while principal photography began in October 2024. Post-production took place in 2025.

Nini was released in Nigeria by Tribe Nation Theatrical Distribution on October 3, 2025, across 74 cinemas.

The cast includes Keppy Ekpenyong, Antar Laniyan, Yemi Blaq, Tina Mba, Jide Kosoko, Chimezie Imo, Francis Duru, Damilola Ogunsi, Chinyere Wilfred, Mariah Ugbashi, Tony Goodman, Sydney Diala, Patricia Charles, and Maryann Apollo.

== Plot ==
Romoke is a sanctimonious mother, whose world view is hinged on purity and conjugal decency. She prides her self in being an apostle of clean mind and a proponent of "no sex" before marriage, this virtues she wears with pride. Married to Femi Roberts, the union produced a son - Bayo. Niniola, Romoke's only daughter was a product of her spinsterhood "error", and this mistake she swore will not repeat itself through her daughter, on the premise of this she guard her daughter sanctimoniously.

Niniola, a graduate from a university of repute with few post graduate degrees to her credit, is in a romantic relationship with Nnamdi Kalu. Nnamdi raised in a healthy home is also in a romantic relationship with Nini. His father Osita Kalu and mother Nkem Kalu, bequeaths their children healthy parentage.

In this complexity of love, parentage and ego, is Skippo, a popular political thug whose duty was to protect the oil pipeline in the community has a healthy friendship with Chief Adamu, a popular senator, who in turn is a friend to Osita Kalu, Nnamdi's father, and this complex friendship eventually re-enacted the bond of love, family and relationship.

Nnamdi and Nini were at the Nini's residence on a fateful day, when the parents were not home. Basking in the euphoria of the moment, undergird by the love they both shared, they decided to go up into the room for private discussions. Apparently they slept and the duo woke up to Nini disvirgined, the only culprit was Nnamdi, but he vehemently denied in the face of overwhelming evidences. Days led into weeks, and weeks into months, Nini got pregnant, she muscled up courage to tell her parents. Shattered by the news, Nini's mother, Romoke, could not stand the fact that her daughter who she "prides in" and "pride with" is pregnant. All accusing fingers pointed at Nnamdi, of course he should be.

Back in Osita's residence, Nnamdi maintained his position, he is not responsible, and his parents believed him, while Nini's parents won't stop to afflict her. Caught in the web of betrayal and regret, Romoke decided to do the unthinkable, she burnt her daughter's credentials, confronted the Ositas and broke the fragile relationship building between both families. With a ray of hope in sight, Bayo who is a computer game addict and having installed cameras in strategic places in the house to monitor his parents movement, came forward with proof that he knows who raped his sister, on the proviso that he downloads the video from his server. While they were waiting in anticipation for five hours, they woke up to Bayo's death. Suicide or murder no one can tell.

Prior to this moment, Nini ran away from home, not being able to stand her mother's daily verbal insult, she fell victim of rape, molestation and kidnap. As fate will have it, she was rescued by a police officer who took her to Skippo, being the warlord who legally guards the zone, Skippo came to her aide and her healing. On Bayo's death, the only culprit was Nnamdi, because he was the last person the late Bayo chatted with a night before. This led to Nnamdi's arrest, and in a bid to prove his son innocence, Osita through his friend, Chief Adamu sort for help from Skippo, who has in his team seasoned computer ethical hackers and mercenaries.

Skippo eventually became the cul-de-sac of redemption, truth, repose and reunion. In a turn of events laced with pain, tears, regret and revelation, in Skippo was the truth found in an eventual turn which birthed a happily ever after.

== Cast ==
- Mariah Ugabshi as Niniola Roberts
- Tina Mba as Romoke Roberts
- Antar Laniyan as Femi Roberts
- Keppy Ekpenyong as Osita Kalu
- Chimezie Imo as Nnamdi Kalu
- Chinyere Wilfred as Nkem Kalu
- Yemi Blaq as Skippo
- Patricia Okwusor as Mama G
- Tony Goodman as Alhaji Adamu
- Energy Uloko as Poison
- Osaheni Pius-Usiobaifo as Ariya
- John Eddie Tamuno as Agemo
- Kantiok Israel Kazashim as Bayo Roberts
- Maryan Apollo as Bolatito
- Francis Duru as CP Hakeem
- Jide Kosoko as Rev. Father Laz
- Damilola Ogunsi as Michael
- Jessica Okafor as Eduvie
- Agility Onwurah as detective
- Mu'azu Garba as lead police officer
- Sydney Diala as witch doctor
- Kenneth Lawrence Ochichie, Abdulrahman Yahaya, Peter Agony, Osifo Emmanuel, Abubakar Jibrin, Ahwal Yakubu, Ibrahim Mohammed, Samuel Peter, Mohammed Said, Orton, Andrew, Abrahan Edoh, Abubakar Aliwo, Shuaibu Isah, Danladi, Adamu, Lasisi Abdulasalam, Joseph Mashat, Abdulham Sirka, Abel Oscar, Eje Awo as Skippo's henchmen
- Kate Okoye Ekpemilo as Madam Deborah
- Youngest Mama as Deaconess Luke
- Hovana Igiri as Pastor Joy
- Blessing Esohe as Udeme Arinze
- Jennifer Kemi Martins as Silifa
- Elizabeth Popoola as Mama Silifa
- PJ Ikwuagwu as Alhaji Adamu's aide
- Ayodeji Omojoye as cab driver
- Blessing Joel as thug 1
- Okoye Michael as thug 2
- Darlington Castro as Etim
- Jim Anih as Rukewe
- Enitan Audu as Community Hospital nurse
- Ngozi Nnaji as City Hospital nurse
- Abraham Eyeh, Mickey Ogbeche, Ekeh Charles, Temple Ikechukwu, Maureen Gilbert, Eunice Justine, Paul Ladi Grace as police officers
- Nnamdi Daniels as brothel man
- Olajide Kawonise as Kalu's driver
- Nuhu Suleiman as Romoke's driver
- Omini Favour as young Romoke
- Peter Baba as young Skipo
- Lugard Peters Osheku as Dandison
- John Nanchip as security guard
- Okerearu Stephnora, Amarachi Okafor, Damaris Usman, Precious Otibhor Osezuah, Delali Azojani Adeorike, Anthonia Nwaedozie as Mama G's girls

== Production ==
=== Development ===
The pre-production and story development began in June 2023. It was originally titled Albeit.

=== Filming ===
Filmed in locations in Abuja, Federal Capital Territory and Nasarawa State, in October 2024.

=== Post-Production ===
Post-production took place in 2025.

== Music ==
The film score and sound design was done by Ochuko Justin Thomas and Lugard Peters Osheku.

Music title	Written By	Performed by	Music studio
"Money"	Angel Christopher (AnjelSings)	Angel Christopher (AnjelSings)	Miki Studio (Soundit Entertainment)
"Would You be There"	Angel Christopher (AnjelSings)	Angel Christopher (AnjelSings)	Miki Studio (Soundit Entertainment)
"If no be You"	Angel Christopher (AnjelSings)	Angel Christopher (AnjelSings)	Miki Studio (Soundit Entertainment)
"Ewi"	Adewole Titilayo Gloria (Layor Akewi)	Adewole Titilayo Gloria (Layor Akewi)	AK Studio
"Abide with Me"	Henry Francis Lyte	Frank De Tenor	Tor studios
"Now Thank We All Our God" (hymn)	Martin Rinkart Catherine Winkworth	Frank De Tenor	Tor studios
"It Is Well" hymn (saxophone)	Horatio Gates Spafford	CalebSax	Tor studios
"Ise n ise ori"	Apostle Debo Ojubiyi	Bimbo Idemeto	Tor studios
"Nibiti a ti n pe eni de"	Evan Idiagbonya	Bimbo Idemeto	Tor studios
"Gbahara"	Enyichukwu Offia	Chinma Umeh	Tor studios
"Master, The Tempest is Raging" (hymn)	Mary Ann Baker	Chinma Umeh	Tor studios

== Release ==
Nini premiered on September 28, 2025, in Abuja. The film was distributed and released in Nigeria by Tribe Nation Theatrical Distribution on October 3, 2025, in 74 cinemas.
