= Inside Life (2022 film) =

2024 Nigerian Film

- Directed by: Clarence Peters
- Distributed by: Netflix
- Release date: 2022
- Country: Nigeria

Inside Life is a Nigerian six-part television miniseries directed by Clarence Peters. It was released on Netflix on October 11, 2024.

== Plot ==
Set against the bustling backdrop of Lagos, Nigeria, the series intertwines multiple narratives, each exploring the lives of diverse characters facing societal challenges. It explores issues such as police brutality, child abuse, sexual exploitation, human trafficking, ritualistic practices and the struggles faced by Lagosians.

== Cast ==
- Gabriel Afolayan as Ade
- Tomisin Ayoade as Tolu
- Valerie Dish
- Jide Kosoko as Chief
- Zack Orji as Pastor Chima
- Meg Otanwa as Alhaja Simbiat
- Scarlet Gomez
- Jigan Babaoja
- Taye Arimoro
- Nnamdi Agbo
- Uzomaka Onuoha as Titi
- Rachel Emem Isaac
- Chisom Egu as Chiamaka
- Miracle Justin as Mimi
- Gift Ndah as Gift
- Tonia Chukwurah as Itohan
