= Phoenix Fury =

2024 Nigerian drama film

- Directed by: Ifeoma Chukwuogo
- Written by: Ifeoma Chukwuogo
- Produced by: Ifeoma Chukwuogo
- Starring: Ama K. Abebrese; Ijeoma Grace Agu; Adjetey Anang
- Cinematography: Gideon Chidi Chukwu; Adeoluwa Owu
- Edited by: Holmes Awa
- Distributed by: FilmOne Distributions
- Release date: 2024
- Country: Nigeria
- Language: English

Phoenix Fury is a 2024 Nigerian film directed by Ifeoma Chukwuogo.

== Plot ==
The film follows two women dealing with similar experiences as they travel across Nigeria and Ghana seeking revenge against a shared tormentor.

== Cast ==
- Ama K. Abebrese
- Ijeoma Grace Agu
- Adjetey Anang
- Tina Mba
- Alphonse Menyo
- Richard Mofe-Damijo

== Release ==
The film premiered at the 2024 AFRIFF.

== Reception ==
Ini-Abasi Jeffrey of What Kept Me Up described the film as "a story of many elements that melds history with a tale of revenge".
