= Bariga Sugar =

2017 Nigerian short drama film

- Directed by: Ifeoma Nkiruka Chukwuogo
- Written by: Ikenna Edmund Okah; Ifeoma Nkiruka Chukwuogo
- Story by: Ikenna Edmund Okah
- Starring: Tina Mba; Greg 'Teddy Bear' Ojefua; Lucy Ameh; Halimat Olarewaju; Tunde Azeez
- Cinematography: Ademola Soares
- Edited by: Ifeoma Nkiruka Chukwuogo
- Music by: Re Olunuga
- Production company: Fizzy K Pictures
- Release date: 2017
- Running time: 21 minutes
- Country: Nigeria
- Language: Pidgin English

Bariga Sugar is a 2017 Nigerian short film directed by Ifeoma Nkiruka Chukwuogo. The story follows the tender friendship that develops between eight-year old Ese and her friend Jamil, children of sex workers who live in a brothel compound in Bariga. The film premiered at the Africa International Film Festival (AFRIFF) in November, 2016. Bariga Sugar's reviews have been widely positive and was the 2018 winner of the Baobab Award for Best Short Film, a prize given during the Royal African Society's annual Film Africa film festival in London.

== Cast ==
- Tina Mba as Madam Sugar
- Lucy Ameh as Hanatu
- Gregory Ojefua as Soldier
- Tunde Azeez as Jamil
- Blessing Samuel as Tina
- Halima Olarewaju as Ese
- Brutus Richard as Daddy Cool
