= Lugard (film) =

- Directed by: Tunde Olaoye
- Written by: Laduba Quadri Qidad, Segun Akejeje
- Story by: Segun Akejeje, Quadri Qidad
- Produced by: Hakeem Olageshin
- Starring: Gabriel Afolayan, Kehinde Bankole, Mr Macaroni, Omowumi Dada, Adeniyi Johnson, Chinyere Wilfred, Nobert Young, Zack Orji and Kalu Ikeagwu.
- Production companies: Knights Film Production, B5Films, Monomania Entertainment.
- Release date: 27 August 2021
- Country: Nigeria
- Language: English

Lugard is a 2021 Nigerian action movie written by Laduba Quadri Qidad and Segun Akejeje. The movie was directed by Tunde Olaoye, produced by Hakeem Olageshin and released under the production studio of 3 Knights Film Production in conjunction with B5Films and Monomania Entertainment. The movie stars Gabriel Afolayan, Kehinde Bankole, Debo Macaroni, Omowunmi Dada, Adeniyi Johnson, Chinyere Wilfred, Nobert Young, Zack Orji and Kalu Ikeagwu.

== Synopsis ==
An intelligent student at the university was forceful dragged into cultism because of his talent. It became complicated when his first assignment led to the death of the rival gang's leader and he had to battle with his life and study through the film.

== Premiere ==
The movie was premiered on the 22 August 2021 and was screened in cinemas across the country on the 27 August 2021.

== Cast ==
- Abiodun Adebanjo as Roy
- Adebowale 'Debo' Adebayo as Leonard
- Gabriel Afolayan as Little
- Kehinde Bankole as Mary
- Omowunmi Dada as Matilda
- Kalu Ikeagwu as Physical
- Adeniyi Johnson as Tolu
- Yomi Olorunlolaye as John
- Zack Orji as V.C.
- Hafiz Oyetoro as Fagbemi
- Quadri Qidad as Rotimi/Powerline/Lugard
- Rotimi Salami as Usman
- Yinka Salau as Mendola
- Jsmile Uhuru as Osuji
- Chinyere Wilfred as Consul Francis Mama
- Norbert Young as Prof. Lambo
