= Selly Galley =

Ghanaian actress and TV presenter

- Born: Selorm Galley; 25 September 1987 (age 38)
- Citizenship: Ghanaian
- Occupations: Actress; television presenter
- Spouse: Praye Tietia

Selly Galley, born 25 September 1987 as Selorm Galley is a Ghanaian actress and TV presenter. She was on Big Brother Africa (season 8).

== Personal life ==
She is married to Praye Tietia, a Ghanaian hip hop star.
