= Ann Obaseki =

Nigerian movie producer

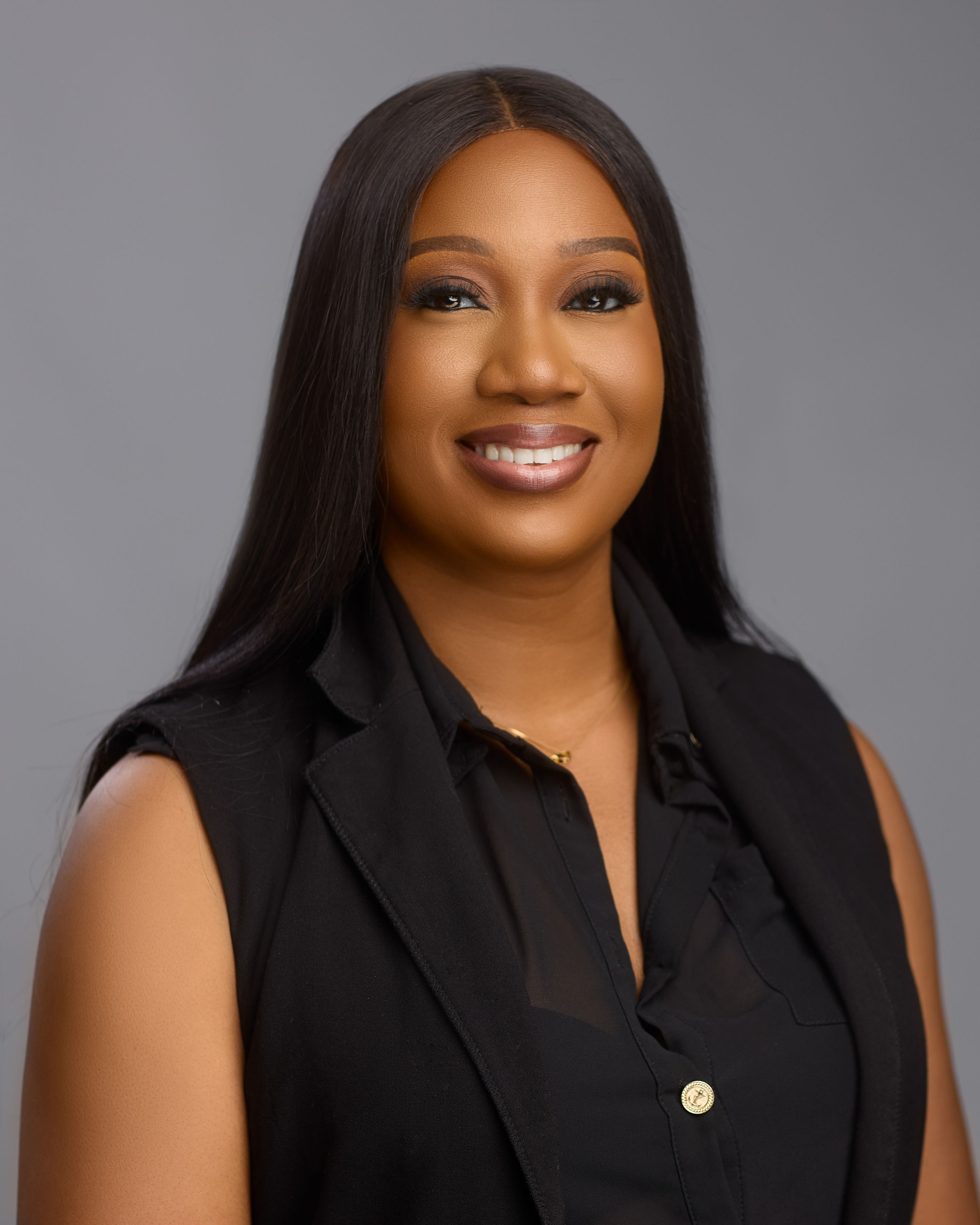
- Born: Lagos, Nigeria
- Occupations: Media Professional, Entrepreneur
- Notable work: Visa on Arrival

Ann Obaseki Uwah (born 9 December) is a Nigerian media practitioner, talent manager, film producer and entrepreneur. She is the founder of TalentVille Africa, a talent development and entertainment company, and has worked in broadcasting as a manager of Lounge FM and the Lounge Network.

Obaseki began her career in entertainment management, working with comedians, actors and musicians. Her clients have included comedians Basketmouth and Bovi, and actress Ini Okojie. She founded TalentVille Africa in 2018, with a focus on developing and promoting emerging creative talent.

== Early life and education ==
Obaseki was born in Lagos, Nigeria, to Grace Afoma Uwah and Jackson Oyuki Obaseki. Her family has roots in Edo State. She attended Sunnyfields Primary School and Anglican Girls' Grammar School before studying Combined Arts at the University of Nigeria, Nsukka.

== Career ==
Obaseki's early work was in talent management within Nigeria's entertainment industry. She subsequently became involved in entertainment production and the development of musical talent.

In 2018, she founded TalentVille Africa, a company focused on talent development and entertainment services. One of its projects is the Loud Urban Choir, initially introduced as the TalentVille Choir at Basketmouth's Lords of the Ribs event in September 2019. The group was subsequently renamed the Loud Urban Choir.

Obaseki was a producer of the comedy television series Visa on Arrival, which was released in 2021. The series was nominated for Best Television Series at the 2023 Africa Magic Viewers' Choice Awards.

Visa on Arrival was also nominated for Best Comedy Series at the Humour Awards.

== Broadcasting ==
In June 2023, Obaseki was appointed general manager of Lounge FM Lagos. At the time of her appointment, The Guardian reported that she had more than 20 years of experience in Nigeria's entertainment industry.

In the role, Obaseki said she intended to use digital technologies, analytics and artificial intelligence in the development of radio and television programming. She also discussed the station's plans to expand its streaming services and reach African audiences in the diaspora.

By 2024, Obaseki was described as managing director of the Lounge Network, whose radio operations included Lounge FM in Lagos and Abuja and Bside Radio in Benin City.

== TalentVille Africa ==
TalentVille Africa has been associated with the development and promotion of emerging performers and creative projects. Its Loud Urban Choir was created as a platform for performers outside the mainstream entertainment industry and has performed in entertainment events in Nigeria.

Obaseki has also represented TalentVille in entertainment projects involving Bovi. In 2023, she was quoted by Vanguard in connection with Bovi's comedy production Identity Crisis and discussed his approach to content and production.

== Awards and nominations ==
Obaseki's production work has been associated with nominations at Nigerian entertainment awards. Visa on Arrival was nominated for Best Television Series at the 2023 Africa Magic Viewers' Choice Awards. It was also nominated for Best Comedy Series at the 2023 Humour Awards.
