= Big Brother Africa season 7 =

Big Brother Africa
- Season 7
- No. of days: 91
- No. of housemates: 35
- Winner: Keagan
- Runner-up: Prezzo

Season chronology
- ← Previous; Season 6 Next → Season 8

Big Brother Africa 7 (also known as Big Brother Africa: StarGame!) was the seventh season of the Big Brother Africa reality television series produced by Endemol for M-Net. It began on 6 May 2012, and ran for 91 days ending on 5 August 2012. Ikponmwosa "IK" Osakioduwa came back to host the show for the fourth time in a row. The first episode had live performances from American rapper J. Cole, Kenyan hip hop group Camp Mulla, Nigerian musicians P-Square, Naeto C, Flavour and Davido, and South African artist Aemo E'Face in the opening ceremony. On Thursday, 14 February 2013; Goldie died at the age of 29 after returning from the Grammy Awards. She is the first Big Brother Africa ex-housemate to die.

== Format ==
There were thirty-five housemates this season and lived in two houses. Upville and Downville. Seven of the thirty-five were celebrity housemates who lived in the Upville House while the remaining twenty-eight lived in the Downville House. The housemates were competing for US$300,000. This season also featured the Random Lottery Nomination where two countries from the Downville House will be nominated for the week and depending on the votes, the survivors will move to the Upville House while the rest are evicted. This year, fourteen countries participated in the season. Each country had two representatives paired up as Big Brother Friends plus seven celebrities from the fourteen African countries. Of the fourteen countries, twelve of them were returning countries while the other two were new ones. The twelve returning countries were Angola, Botswana, Ghana, Kenya, Malawi, Namibia, Nigeria, South Africa, Tanzania, Uganda, Zambia and Zimbabwe. The two new countries were Liberia and Sierra Leone.

== Housemates ==
On Day 1, thirty five housemates entered the House on launch night including 7 celebrity contestants.

Celebrity contestant.

Name	Real/Full Name	Age	Occupation	Country	Day entered	Day exited	Status
Keagan	Keagan Petersen	22	Intern Manager	South Africa	1	91	Winner
Prezzo	Jackson Ngechu Makini	32	Musician	Kenya	1	91	Runner-up
Lady May	Martha Namundjebo	25	Musician	Namibia	1	91	3rd Place
Talia	Talia Hayward	23	Graphic Designer	Zambia	1	91	4th Place
Kyle	Kyle Duncan Kushaba	24	Journalist	Uganda	1	91	5th Place
Wati	Watipaso Vincent Kulemeka	22	Entrepreneur	Malawi	1	91	6th Place
Janette	Jannette Georgina Lutaaya	22	Dancer	Uganda	1	84	Evicted
Alex	Alex Mugachia Chege	23	Student	Kenya	1	77	Evicted
Keitta	Keitta Ossei Massai	22	Model	Ghana	1	77	Evicted
Goldie	Susan Oluwabimpe Harvey	28	Musician	Nigeria	1	70	Evicted
Junia	Junia Cloete	23	Receptionist	Namibia	1	63	Evicted
Malonza	Malonza Chege	22	Student	Kenya	1	63	Evicted
Nafe	Alinafe Phillip Kulemeka	22	Assistant Administrator	Malawi	1	56	Evicted
Tamara	Tamara Ngozi Nyirongo	27	Musician	Zambia	1	56	Evicted
Barbz	Babalwa Mneno-Mandel	34	Model & Events Manager	South Africa	1	49	Evicted
Maneta	Maneta Mazanhi	21	Student	Zimbabwe	1	44	Ejected
Roki	Rockford Josphat	27	Musician	Zimbabwe	1	44	Ejected
Jesica	Jesica Shikeva	21	Student	Namibia	1	42	Evicted
Lee	Lee Stemmet	22	Student	South Africa	1	42	Evicted
DKB	Derick Kobina Bonney	26	Comedian	Ghana	1	29	Ejected
Zainab	Zainab Sheriff	26	Model	Sierra Leone	1	29	Ejected
Edith	Edith Maygilip	30	Personal Assistant	Botswana	1	28	Evicted
Eve	Evelyn Lilian Maygilip	25	Marketer	Botswana	1	28	Evicted
Mildred	Mildred Ashong	25	Musician	Ghana	1	28	Evicted
Esperanca	Esperanca Vemba	24	Model	Angola	1	26	Walked
Seydou	Seydou Soumare	26	Entrepreneur	Angola	1	26	Walked
Mampi	Mampi Mirriam Mukape	25	R&B Singer	Zambia	1	21	Evicted
Dalphin	Dalphin Alexander	27	Model Booker	Sierra Leone	1	14	Evicted
Luke	Lukuly Dokinah	26	Entrepreneur	Liberia	1	14	Evicted
Yadel	Yadel Nimley	22	Entertainer	Liberia	1	14	Evicted
Chris	Christian Asekomeh	25	Fashion Designer	Nigeria	1	12	Walked
Ola	Olamilekan Ibrahim Barake	29	Interior Designer	Nigeria	1	12	Walked
Hilda	Hilda Reiffenstein	28	Saleswoman	Tanzania	1	7	Evicted
Julio	Juliano Joseph Batalia	27	Manager	Tanzania	1	7	Evicted
Teclar	Teclar Mazanhi	31	Actress	Zimbabwe	1	7	Evicted

== Nominations table ==
	Week 1	Week 2	Week 3	Week 4	Week 5	Week 6	Week 7	Week 8	Week 9	Week 10	Week 11	Week 12	Week 13
Keagan	No nominations	No nominations	Not eligible	No nominations	Not eligible	Nominated	Exempt	Not eligible	Junia, Lady May	Lady May, Prezzo	Lady May, Prezzo	Lady May, Prezzo	Winner (Day 91)
Prezzo	Not eligible	Not eligible	Mampi, DKB	Not eligible	DKB, Zainab	Not eligible	Barbz, Maneta	Not eligible	Lady May, Goldie	Lady May, Wati	Keagan, Talia	Lady May, Kyle	Runner-Up (Day 91)
Lady May	Not eligible	Not eligible	Mampi, Maneta	Not eligible	Goldie, DKB	Not eligible	Prezzo, Goldie	Not eligible	Keitta, Prezzo	Kyle, Keitta	Wati, Keagan	Wati, Janette	3rd Place (Day 91)
Talia	No nominations	No nominations	Not eligible	No nominations	Not eligible	No nominations	Not eligible	Nominated	Exempt	Alex, Janette	Prezzo, Alex	Wati, Prezzo	4th Place (Day 91)
Kyle	No nominations	No nominations	Not eligible	No nominations	Not eligible	No nominations	Not eligible	No nominations	Junia, Keagan	Lady May, Prezzo	Lady May, Prezzo	Wati, Prezzo	5th Place (Day 91)
Wati	No nominations	No nominations	Not eligible	No nominations	Not eligible	No nominations	Not eligible	Nominated	Exempt	Lady May, Goldie	Prezzo, Alex	Talia, Janette	6th Place (Day 91)
Janette	No nominations	No nominations	Not eligible	No nominations	Not eligible	No nominations	Not eligible	No nominations	Keagan, Alex	Lady May, Keagan	Lady May, Wati	Wati, Prezzo	Evicted (Day 84)
Alex	No nominations	No nominations	Not eligible	No nominations	Not eligible	No nominations	Not eligible	No nominations	Kyle, Janette	Prezzo, Lady May	Lady May, Prezzo	Evicted (Day 77)	
Keitta	No nominations	No nominations	Not eligible	Nominated	Exempt	Not eligible	Maneta, Barbz	Not eligible	Lady May, Goldie	Lady May, Goldie	Lady May, Prezzo	Evicted (Day 77)	
Goldie	Not eligible	Not eligible	Mampi, Maneta	Not eligible	Lady May, Maneta	Not eligible	Maneta, Lady May	Not eligible	Lady May, Malonza	Lady May, Keagan	Evicted (Day 70)		
Junia	No nominations	No nominations	Not eligible	No nominations	Not eligible	Nominated	Exempt	Not eligible	Kyle, Lady May	Evicted (Day 63)			
Malonza	No nominations	No nominations	Not eligible	No nominations	Not eligible	No nominations	Not eligible	No nominations	Kyle, Lady May	Evicted (Day 63)			
Nafe	No nominations	No nominations	Not eligible	No nominations	Not eligible	No nominations	Not eligible	Nominated	Evicted (Day 56)				
Tamara	No nominations	No nominations	Not eligible	No nominations	Not eligible	No nominations	Not eligible	Nominated	Evicted (Day 56)				
Barbz	Not eligible	Not eligible	Prezzo, Mampi	Not eligible	Roki, Prezzo	Not eligible	Prezzo, Lady May	Evicted (Day 49)					
Maneta	Nominated	Not eligible	DKB, Goldie	Not eligible	DKB, Roki	Not eligible	Goldie, Prezzo	Ejected (Day 44)					
Roki	Not eligible	Not eligible	Mampi, Maneta	Not eligible	Zainab, DKB	Not eligible	Maneta, Barbz	Ejected (Day 44)					
Jesica	No nominations	No nominations	Not eligible	No nominations	Not eligible	Nominated	Evicted (Day 42)						
Lee	No nominations	No nominations	Not eligible	No nominations	Not eligible	Nominated	Evicted (Day 42)						
DKB	Not eligible	Not eligible	Mampi, Lady May	Not eligible	Goldie, Zainab	Ejected (Day 29)							
Zainab	No nominations	Nominated	Exempt	Not eligible	Barbz, DKB	Ejected (Day 29)							
Edith	No nominations	No nominations	Not eligible	Nominated	Evicted (Day 28)								
Eve	No nominations	No nominations	Not eligible	Nominated	Evicted (Day 28)								
Mildred	No nominations	No nominations	Not eligible	Nominated	Evicted (Day 28)								
Esperanca	No nominations	No nominations	Not eligible	No nominations	Walked (Day 26)								
Seydou	No nominations	No nominations	Not eligible	No nominations	Walked (Day 26)								
Mampi	Not eligible	Not eligible	DKB, Goldie	Evicted (Day 21)									
Dalphin	No nominations	Nominated	Evicted (Day 14)										
Luke	No nominations	Nominated	Evicted (Day 14)										
Yadel	No nominations	Nominated	Evicted (Day 14)										
Chris	No nominations	No nominations	Walked (Day 12)										
Ola	No nominations	No nominations	Walked (Day 12)										
Hilda	Nominated	Evicted (Day 7)											
Julio	Nominated	Evicted (Day 7)											
Teclar	Nominated	Evicted (Day 7)											
Head of House	Barbz; Keitta	Mampi; ~~Hilda~~; Alex	DKB; Esperanca; Keagan	Goldie; Keagan	Barbz; Malonza	Lady May; Keagan	Goldie; Wati	Keitta; Talia	Keagan	Keagan	Kyle	Wati	Keagan
Up for eviction	Hilda, Julio, Maneta, Teclar	Dalphin, Luke, Yadel, Zainab	Lady May, Mampi, Maneta	Edith, Eve, Keitta, Mildred	none	Jesica, Junia, Keagan, Lee	Barbz, Keitta, ~~Maneta~~	Nafe, Talia, Tamara, Wati	Goldie, Junia, Kyle, Lady May, Malonza, Prezzo	Goldie, Kyle, Lady May, Prezzo	Alex, Keitta, Lady May, Prezzo, Wati	Janette, Kyle, Lady May, Prezzo	Keagan, Kyle, Lady May, Prezzo, Talia, Wati
Walked	none	Chris; Ola	none	Esperanca; Seydou	none								
Ejected	none				DKB; Zainab	none	Maneta; Roki	none					
Survived Eviction	Maneta; 8 of 15 votes to save	Zainab; 13 of 15 votes to save	Lady May; 12 of 15 votes to save Maneta; 2 of 15 votes to save	Keitta; 8 of 15 votes to save	No Eviction	Junia; 7 of 15 votes to save Keagan; 7 of 15 votes to save	Keitta; 11 of 15 votes to save	Talia; 12 of 15 votes to save Wati; 3 of 15 votes to save	Lady May; 5.5 of 15 votes to save Goldie; 3.5 of 15 votes to save Kyle; 2 of 15 votes to save Prezzo; 2 of 15 votes to save	Kyle; 6 of 15 votes to save Prezzo; 4 of 15 votes to save Lady May; 3 of 15 votes to save	Lady May; 5 of 15 votes to save Prezzo; 5 of 15 votes to save Wati; 3 of 15 votes to save	Kyle; 6 of 15 votes to save Lady May; 4 of 15 votes to save Prezzo; 4 of 15 votes to save	Keagan; 7 of 15 votes to win
Evicted	Hilda; 6 of 15 votes to save Julio; 1 of 15 votes to save Teclar no votes to save	Luke; 1 of 15 votes to save Yadel; 1 of 15 votes to save Dalphin no votes to save	Mampi; 1 of 15 votes to save	Eve; 7 of 15 votes to save Edith no votes to save Mildred no votes to save	No Eviction	Jesica; 1 of 15 votes to save Lee no votes to save	Barbz; 4 of 15 votes to save	Nafe no votes to save Tamara no votes to save	Junia; 1 of 15 votes to save Malonza; 1 of 15 votes to save	Goldie; 2 of 15 votes to save	Keitta; 2 of 15 votes to save Alex no votes to save	Janette; 1 of 15 votes to save	Prezzo; 2 of 15 votes to win
Evicted	Hilda; 6 of 15 votes to save Julio; 1 of 15 votes to save Teclar no votes to save	Luke; 1 of 15 votes to save Yadel; 1 of 15 votes to save Dalphin no votes to save	Mampi; 1 of 15 votes to save	Eve; 7 of 15 votes to save Edith no votes to save Mildred no votes to save	No Eviction	Jesica; 1 of 15 votes to save Lee no votes to save	Barbz; 4 of 15 votes to save	Nafe no votes to save Tamara no votes to save	Junia; 1 of 15 votes to save Malonza; 1 of 15 votes to save	Goldie; 2 of 15 votes to save	Keitta; 2 of 15 votes to save Alex no votes to save	Janette; 1 of 15 votes to save	Lady May; 2 of 15 votes to win
Evicted	Hilda; 6 of 15 votes to save Julio; 1 of 15 votes to save Teclar no votes to save	Luke; 1 of 15 votes to save Yadel; 1 of 15 votes to save Dalphin no votes to save	Mampi; 1 of 15 votes to save	Eve; 7 of 15 votes to save Edith no votes to save Mildred no votes to save	No Eviction	Jesica; 1 of 15 votes to save Lee no votes to save	Barbz; 4 of 15 votes to save	Nafe no votes to save Tamara no votes to save	Junia; 1 of 15 votes to save Malonza; 1 of 15 votes to save	Goldie; 2 of 15 votes to save	Keitta; 2 of 15 votes to save Alex no votes to save	Janette; 1 of 15 votes to save	Talia; 2 of 15 votes to win Kyle; 1 of 15 votes to win Wati; 1 of 15 votes to win

Legend:
Red names indicate Upville housemates.
Blue names indicate Downville housemates.

== Nominations total received ==
	Week 1	Week 2	Week 3	Week 4	Week 5	Week 6	Week 7	Week 8	Week 9	Week 10	Week 11	Week 12	Week 13	Total
Keagan	0	0	0	0	0	0	0	0	2	2	2	0	Winner	6
Prezzo	0	0	1	0	1	0	3	0	1	3	6	4	Runner-Up	19
Lady May	0	0	1	0	1	0	2	0	6	8	5	2	3rd Place	25
Talia	0	0	0	0	0	0	0	0	0	0	1	1	4th Place	2
Kyle	0	0	0	0	0	0	0	0	3	1	0	1	5th Place	5
Wati	0	0	0	0	0	0	0	0	0	1	2	4	6th Place	7
Janette	0	0	0	0	0	0	0	0	1	1	0	2	Evicted	4
Alex	0	0	0	0	0	0	0	0	1	1	2	Evicted		4
Keitta	0	0	0	0	0	0	0	0	1	1	0	Evicted		2
Goldie	0	0	2	0	2	0	2	0	2	2	Evicted			10
Junia	0	0	0	0	0	0	0	0	2	Evicted				2
Malonza	0	0	0	0	0	0	0	0	1	Evicted				1
Nafe	0	0	0	0	0	0	0	0	Evicted					0
Tamara	0	0	0	0	0	0	0	0	Evicted					0
Barbz	0	0	0	0	1	0	3	Evicted						4
Maneta	0	0	3	0	1	0	4	Ejected						8
Roki	0	0	0	0	2	0	0	Ejected						2
Jesica	0	0	0	0	0	0	Evicted							0
Lee	0	0	0	0	0	0	Evicted							0
DKB	0	0	3	0	5	Ejected								8
Zainab	0	0	0	0	3	Ejected								3
Edith	0	0	0	0	Evicted									0
Eve	0	0	0	0	Evicted									0
Mildred	0	0	0	0	Evicted									0
Esperanca	0	0	0	0	Walked									0
Seydou	0	0	0	0	Walked									0
Mampi	0	0	6	Evicted										6
Dalphin	0	0	Evicted											0
Luke	0	0	Evicted											0
Yadel	0	0	Evicted											0
Chris	0	0	Walked											0
Ola	0	0	Walked											0
Hilda	0	Evicted												0
Julio	0	Evicted												0
Teclar	0	Evicted												0

Legend:
Red names indicate Upville housemates.
Blue names indicate Downville housemates.
Head of House of the week.
No nominations for that house for the week.
Nominated for the week.
Immune from nominations for the week.

== Voting history ==
	Week 1	Week 2	Week 3	Week 4	Week 5	Week 6	Week 7	Week 8	Week 9	Week 10	Week 11	Week 12	Week 13
Angola	Julio	Zainab	Lady May	Keitta	No Eviction	Keagan	Keitta	Talia	Junia	Prezzo	Lady May	Lady May	Keagan
Botswana	Maneta	Zainab	Maneta	Eve	No Eviction	Keagan	Barbz	Wati	Lady May	Lady May	Lady May	Lady May	Keagan
Ghana	Hilda	Zainab	Lady May	Keitta	No Eviction	Junia	Keitta	Talia	Goldie	Kyle	Keitta	Janette	Keagan
Kenya	Maneta	Zainab	Lady May	Eve	No Eviction	Junia	Keitta	Talia	Prezzo	Prezzo	Prezzo	Prezzo	Prezzo
Liberia	Hilda	Yadel	Lady May	Keitta	No Eviction	Keagan	Keitta	Wati	Goldie/Lady May	Prezzo	Prezzo	Prezzo	Keagan
Malawi	Maneta	Zainab	Lady May	Eve	No Eviction	Keagan	Keitta	Wati	Kyle	Kyle	Wati	Kyle	Wati
Namibia	Maneta	Zainab	Lady May	Eve	No Eviction	Junia	Keitta	Talia	Lady May	Lady May	Lady May	Lady May	Lady May
Nigeria	Hilda	Zainab	Lady May	Keitta	No Eviction	Junia	Keitta	Talia	Goldie	Goldie	Lady May	Kyle	Keagan
Sierra Leone	Hilda	Zainab	Lady May	Keitta	No Eviction	Keagan	Barbz	Talia	Lady May	Kyle	Keitta	Kyle	Talia
South Africa	Maneta	Zainab	Lady May	Eve	No Eviction	Keagan	Barbz	Talia	Lady May	Kyle	Wati	Kyle	Keagan
Tanzania	Hilda	Zainab	Lady May	Keitta	No Eviction	Jesica	Keitta	Talia	Prezzo	Prezzo	Prezzo	Prezzo	Prezzo
Uganda	Hilda	Zainab	Lady May	Eve	No Eviction	Junia	Keitta	Talia	Kyle	Kyle	Prezzo	Kyle	Kyle
Zambia	Maneta	Luke	Mampi	Keitta	No Eviction	Junia	Keitta	Talia	Malonza	Kyle	Wati	Kyle	Talia
Zimbabwe	Maneta	Zainab	Maneta	Eve	No Eviction	Junia	Keitta	Talia	Lady May	Lady May	Lady May	Lady May	Lady May
Rest of Africa	Maneta	Zainab	Lady May	Keitta	No Eviction	Keagan	Barbz	Talia	Goldie	Goldie	Prezzo	Prezzo	Keagan

Survivor(s) of the vote.

== Nominations and voting notes ==
=== Week 1 ===
On Day 1, Tanzania and Zimbabwe were nominated via the Random Lottery Nomination, making Hilda, Julio, Maneta and Teclar up for eviction for the week.

This week, viewers voted for the housemate they wanted to save and these were the results:

- Maneta received 8 votes to save: Botswana, Kenya, Malawi, Namibia, South Africa, Zambia, Zimbabwe and Rest of Africa.
- Hilda received 6 votes to save: Ghana, Liberia, Nigeria, Sierra Leone, Tanzania and Uganda.
- Julio received 1 vote to save: Angola.
- Teclar received no votes to save.

On Day 7, Hilda, Julio and Teclar were evicted while Maneta moved to the Upville House.

=== Week 2 ===
On Day 8, Liberia and Sierra Leone were nominated via the Random Lottery Nomination, making Dalphin, Luke, Yadel and Zainab up for eviction for the week.

On Day 12, Chris and Ola walked out of the house due to the latter's health problems.

This week, viewers voted for housemate they wanted to save and these were the results:

- Zainab received 13 votes to save: Angola, Botswana, Ghana, Kenya, Malawi, Namibia, Nigeria, Sierra Leone, South Africa, Tanzania, Uganda, Zimbabwe and Rest of Africa.
- Luke received 1 vote to save: Zambia.
- Yadel received 1 vote to save: Liberia.
- Dalphin received no votes to save.

On Day 14, Dalphin, Luke and Yadel were evicted while Zainab moved to the Upville House.

=== Week 3 ===
On Day 15, nominations occurred in the Upville House. Zainab was exempted from the nominations after joining the house the previous day.

The initial nominees were DKB, Mampi and Maneta.
Head of House, DKB decided to save himself and replace himself with Lady May.
Therefore, Lady May, Mampi and Maneta were up for eviction for the week.

This week, viewers voted for the housemate they wanted to save and these were the results:

- Lady May received 12 votes to save: Angola, Ghana, Kenya, Liberia, Malawi, Namibia, Nigeria, Sierra Leone, South Africa, Tanzania, Uganda and Rest of Africa.
- Maneta received 2 votes to save: Botswana and Zimbabwe.
- Mampi received 1 vote to save: Zambia.

On Day 21, Mampi was evicted.

=== Week 4 ===
On Day 22, Botswana and Ghana were nominated via the Random Lottery Nomination, making Edith, Eve, Keitta and Mildred up for eviction for the week.

On Day 26, Esperanca and Seydou walked out of the house due to the former's personal issues.

This week, viewers voted for the housemate they wanted to save and these were the results:

- Keitta received 8 votes to save: Angola, Ghana, Liberia, Nigeria, Sierra Leone, Tanzania, Zambia and Rest of Africa.
- Eve received 7 votes to save: Botswana, Kenya, Malawi, Namibia, South Africa, Uganda and Zimbabwe.
- Edith and Mildred received no votes to save.

On Day 28, Edith, Eve and Mildred were evicted while Keitta moved to the Upville House.

=== Week 5 ===
On Day 29, nominations occurred in the "Upville" House. Keitta was exempted from the nominations after joining the house the previous day.
On the same day, Big Brother ejected DKB and Zainab for breaking the no violence rule.

Due to this event, this week's eviction show was cancelled.

=== Week 6 ===
On Day 36, Namibia and South Africa were nominated via the Random Lottery Nomination, making Jesica, Junia, Keagan and Lee up for eviction for the week.

This week, viewers voted for the housemate they wanted to save and these were the results:

- Junia received 7 votes to save: Ghana, Kenya, Namibia, Nigeria, Uganda, Zambia and Zimbabwe.
- Keagan received 7 votes to save: Angola, Botswana, Liberia, Malawi, Sierra Leone, South Africa and Rest of Africa.
- Jesica received 1 vote to save: Tanzania.
- Lee received no votes to save.

On Day 42, Jesica and Lee were evicted while Junia and Keagan moved to the Upville House.

=== Week 7 ===
On Day 43, nominations occurred in the Upville House. Junia and Keagan were exempted from the nominations after joining the house the previous day.

The initial nominees were Barbz, Maneta and Prezzo.
Head of House, Goldie decided to save Prezzo and replace him with Keitta.
Therefore, Barbz, Keitta and Maneta were up for eviction for the week.

On Day 44, Big Brother ejected Maneta and Roki for breaking the no violence rule.
This means only Barbz and Keitta were this week's nominees.

This week, viewers were voting for the housemate they wanted to save and these were the results:

- Keitta received 11 votes to save: Angola, Ghana, Kenya, Liberia, Malawi, Namibia, Nigeria, Tanzania, Uganda, Zambia and Zimbabwe.
- Barbz received 4 votes to save: Botswana, Sierra Leone, South Africa and Rest of Africa.

On Day 49, Barbz was evicted.

=== Week 8 ===
On Day 50, Malawi and Zambia were nominated via the Random Loterry Nomination, making Nafe, Talia, Tamara and Wati up for eviction for the week.

This week, viewers voted for the housemate they wanted to save and these were the results:

- Talia received 12 votes to save: Angola, Ghana, Kenya, Namibia, Nigeria, Sierra Leone, South Africa, Tanzania, Uganda, Zambia, Zimbabwe and Rest of Africa.
- Wati received 3 votes to save: Botswana, Liberia and Malawi.
- Nafe and Tamara received no votes to save.

On Day 56, Nafe and Tamara were evicted while Talia and Wati moved to the Upville House.
On the same day, the remaining Downville housemates moved to the Upville House.

=== Week 9 ===
On Day 57, nominations occurred. Talia and Wati were exempted from the nominations after joining the Upville House the previous day. All housemates were living in the Upville House after the houses merged on Day 56.

The initial nominees were Goldie, Junia, Keagan, Kyle, Lady May and Prezzo.
Head of House, Keagan decided to save himself and replace himself with Malonza.
Therefore, Goldie, Junia, Kyle, Lady May, Malonza and Prezzo were up for eviction for the week.

This week, viewers voted for the housemate they wanted to save and these were the results:

- Lady May received 5.5 votes to save: Botswana, Liberia*, Namibia, Sierra Leone, South Africa and Zimbabwe.
- Goldie received 3.5 votes to save: Ghana, Liberia*, Nigeria and Rest of Africa.
- Prezzo received 2 votes to save: Kenya and Tanzania.
- Kyle received 2 votes to save: Malawi and Uganda.
- Junia received 1 vote to save: Angola.
- Malonza received 1 vote to save: Zambia.

*Lady May and Goldie shared a vote from Liberia.

On Day 63, Junia and Malonza were evicted.

=== Week 10 ===
On Day 64, nominations occurred.

The initial nominees were Goldie, Keagan, Lady May and Prezzo.
Head of House, Keagan decided to save himself and replace himself with Kyle.
Therefore, Goldie, Kyle, Lady May were up for eviction for the week.

This week, viewers voted for the housemate they wanted to save and these were the results:

- Kyle received 6 votes to save: Ghana, Malawi, Sierra Leone, South Africa, Uganda and Zimbabwe.
- Prezzo received 4 votes to save: Angola, Kenya, Liberia and Tanzania.
- Lady May received 3 votes to save: Botswana, Namibia and Zimbabwe.
- Goldie received 2 votes to save: Nigeria and Rest of Africa.

On Day 70, Goldie was evicted.

=== Week 11 ===
On Day 71, nominations occurred.

The initial nominees were Alex, Keagan, Lady May, Prezzo and Wati.
Head of House, Kyle decided to save Keagan and replace him with Keitta.
Therefore, Alex, Keitta, Lady May, Prezzo and Wati were up for eviction for the week.

This week, viewers voted for the housemate they wanted to save and these were the results:

- Lady May received 5 votes to save: Angola, Botswana, Namibia, Nigeria and Zimbabwe.
- Prezzo received 5 votes to save: Kenya, Liberia, Tanzania, Uganda and Rest of Africa.
- Wati received 3 votes to save: Malawi, South Africa and Zambia.
- Keitta received 2 votes to save: Ghana and Sierra Leone.
- Alex received no votes to save.

On Day 77, Alex and Keitta were evicted.

=== Week 12 ===
On Day 78, nominations occurred.

The initial nominees were Janette, Lady May, Prezzo and Wati.
Head of House, Wati decided to save himself and replace himself with Kyle.
Therefore, Janette, Kyle, Lady May and Prezzo were up for eviction for the week.

This week, viewers voted for the housemate they wanted to save and these were the results:

- Kyle received 6 voted to save: Malawi, Nigeria, Sierra Leone, South Africa, Uganda and Zambia.
- Lady May received 4 votes to save: Angola, Botswana, Namibia and Zimbabwe.
- Prezzo received 4 votes to save: Kenya, Liberia, Tanzania and Rest of Africa.
- Janette received 1 vote to save: Ghana.

On Day 84, Janette was evicted.

=== Week 13 ===
Keagan, Kyle, Lady May, Prezzo, Talia and Wati were the finalists of the season. The final six were competing for the grand prize of US$300,000.

This week, viewers voted for the housemate they wanted to win and these were the results:

- Keagan won the season with 7 votes to win: Angola, Botswana, Ghana, Liberia, Nigeria, South Africa and Rest of Africa.
- Prezzo became the runner-up with 2 votes to win: Kenya and Tanzania.
- Lady May finished in 3rd place with 2 votes to win: Namibia and Zimbabwe.
- Talia finished in 4th place with 2 votes to win: Sierra Leone and Zambia.
- Kyle finished in 5th place with 1 vote to win: Uganda.
- Wati finished in 6th place with 1 vote to win: Malawi.

Keagan won 2012's StarGame! season after getting the most votes with 7 country votes.
