= Moshood Obatula =

Nigerian filmmaker and director

- Born: Lagos, Lagos State, Nigeria
- Other name: Director Mosh
- Education: City Varsity
- Occupation: Director
- Years active: 2015-Present
- Known for: Agemo

Moshood Abiola Obatula known professionally as Director Mosh is a Nigerian filmmaker, director, and creative entrepreneur. He is the managing director of the Lagos-based production company Related Motion, and is known for films that explore cultural, supernatural, and socially driven themes within contemporary African storytelling.

== Early life and education ==
Obatula was born and raised in Lagos, Nigeria. He developed an early interest in visual storytelling and filmmaking, which led him to pursue professional training in film and television. He studied at City Varsity, Johannesburg Campus, South Africa, where he received formal education in directing and cinematic production.

== Career ==
Obatula began his career working on short films and creative projects that highlighted his interest in narrative depth, visual symbolism, and culturally grounded storytelling. His work often blends traditional African motifs with modern cinematic techniques.

He later founded Related Motion, a production company focused on film, television, commercials, and digital content. Under his leadership, the company has contributed to the growth of contemporary Nigerian cinema by producing projects that emphasize originality and cultural authenticity.

=== Agemo ===
In 2024, Obatula gained wider recognition with the release of Agemo, a supernatural drama that examines power, control, and resilience, particularly from a female perspective. The film received critical attention for its narrative depth and visual storytelling style.

Agemo was selected for screening at international film festivals, including the African International Film Festival (AFRIFF) and the Toronto International Nollywood Film Festival (TINFF), further expanding its global visibility.The film also marked a career milestone for actress Uzoamaka Onuoha, whose performance in Agemo earned her her first Africa International Film Festival (AFRIFF) Award for Best Female Performance. The recognition was widely noted as a breakthrough moment in her acting career.

=== Other projects ===
Between 2024 and 2025, Obatula expanded his creative portfolio with additional film and television projects, including The Godfather Show, a television series exploring themes of power, legacy, and African identity within a modern African context.

== Artistic style ==
Obatula’s filmmaking style is characterized by the use of supernatural elements, symbolic imagery, and narratives rooted in African culture. His films frequently address social issues and contemporary African realities, positioning him among a growing group of filmmakers shaping modern African cinema.

== Filmography ==
Year	Title	Role
2015	The Olympian’s Torch	Director
2019	South African Love Story \| Stretch	Director
2019	Now	Director
2019	Part of Me	Director
2020	Plagued	Director
2024	Agemo	Director, Executive Producer
2024	Invest Naija	Director
2024	CTF Trailer	Director

== Recognition ==
Obatula’s work has received attention at local and international film festivals, reflecting the increasing global reach of Nigerian and African cinema.

== Personal life ==
Details regarding Obatula’s personal life, including his date of birth and family background, have not been publicly disclosed.
