= Battle on Buka Street =

2022 Nigerian comedy film

- Promotional poster
- Directed by: Funke Akindele; Tobi Makinde
- Written by: Funke Akindele; Jack'enneth Opukeme; Stephen Oluboyo; Jemine Edukugbe
- Story by: Jack'enneth Opukeme
- Produced by: Funke Akindele; Nicole Ofoegbu; FilmOne Studio
- Starring: Funke Akindele; Mercy Johnson; Sola Sobowale; Tina Mba; Nkem Owoh; Femi Jacobs; Kelvin Ikeduba
- Cinematography: Adeoluwa 'Captain Dezgy' Owu
- Edited by: Valentine Chukwuma
- Music by: Martinsfeelz; Adam Songbird; Tolu Obanro; Kleb Shout; Yomi Olabisi; Simi Dada
- Production company: Funke Ayotunde Akindele Network (FAAN)
- Distributed by: FilmOne Distribution
- Release date: 16 December 2022
- Running time: 140 Minutes
- Country: Nigeria
- Languages: English, Yoruba, Igbo, Hausa, Nigerian Pidgin
- Box office: ₦668,423,056

Battle on Buka Street is a 2022 Nigerian comedy drama film, directed by Funke Akindele and Tobi Makinde. The film is jointly produced by Funke Ayotunde Akindele Network (FAAN) and FilmOne Studios. Released in theatres on 16 December 2022, it received positive reviews from critics, and became a huge box office success.

== Plot ==
Yejide runs the most patronized buka (stall) in Otanwa community's "Buka Street" with help from her mother Asake and her children. However, her step-sister and archenemy Awele buys the neighbouring shop one day and starts competing. Their rivalry dates back to before their childhood; their mothers, Asake and Ezinne, both married to their father Meduka, were jealous and conflicted with each other, and this carried on to their children.

At first, Awele fails to attract customers away from Yejide's buka, so she turns to sabotage: she sends her younger twins Kaira and Kaiso to lock Asake in Maduka's house so she can't make her stews. This works and people flock to Awele's restaurant instead, starting a series of retaliatory acts where Awele and Yejide try to curry favor in the town and use their children for their own selfish interest to attack each other's buka by planting rats and cockroaches. Meanwhile, they lie to the rest of the family that Awele's oldest daughter Ifunnaya and Yejide's son Ademide are going to America and Canada respectively. In fact, they both went to Lagos, where they end up meeting and helping each other escape their problems despite the rivalry before returning to Otanwa.

Things go too far when Yejide's daughter Fadekemi replaces the kerosene with petrol at Awele's buka without her mother's knowledge, causing the shop to burn and making Yejide question the rivalry despite Asake's continued zeal. Meanwhile, Ezinne, who has been getting sicker, expresses regret for stoking the rivalry and dies after asking Awele to stop the conflict. Despite this, the two utilize differing spiritual paths to try to take the other down, but end up failing.

A prison break occurs nearby, terrorizing the town as the inmates destroy and rob the shops on Buka Street but also allowing Yejide's husband Lanshile, who took the fall for Yejide after she killed his rival in self-defence and was held for years without trial, to escape. At first, their children, who don't know the truth, resent his arrival, particularly as Ademide was affected by the stigma of being his son and was appointed to perform at the youth carnival. However, they reconcile after Yejide reveals the actual events. At the carnival, the other escapees cause a stampede; Ademide rescues Ifunnaya and takes her to Lanshile's hideout to recover as it is the closest option. Awele finds them and calls the youth organizers, who come ready to mete out vigilante justice. However, the children and Yejide convince her to end the rivalry and she ultimately covers for Lanshile, ending the film with his escape.

== Cast ==
- Funke Akindele as Yejide
- Mercy Johnson as Awele
- Sola Sobowale as Asake
- Tina Mba as Ezinne
- Nkem Owoh as Maduka
- Femi Jacobs as Lanshile
- Kelvin Ikeduba as Chukwuemka
- Sani Musa Danja as Kazeem
- Bimbo Ademoye as Young Asake
- Uche Obunse as Ifunnaya
- Moshood Fattah as Ademide
- Judith Ushi as Fadekami
- Gbemi Akinlade as Kaira
- Miracle Gabriel as Kaiso
- Mike Afolarin
- Wumi Toriola as Yedije friend I
- Regina Chukwu as Yedije friend II

== Production ==
The film project marked the third cinematic directorial venture for actress Funke Akindele after Your Excellency and Omo Ghetto: The Saga. The film also possibly marked the final film venture for Funke Akindele who has insisted on joining politics and running for the Office of Deputy Governor in the Lagos State Governorship Election.

== Box office ==
It became the second highest grossing Nigerian film of the year 2022 just behind Brotherhood grossing about ₦200,087,222 at the box office. The film surpassed Avatar: The Way of Water as the highest-grossing film in Nigeria during the Christmas weekend grossing almost ₦50 million at the box office. The film also grossed ₦26 million at the box office on 25 December 2022 coinciding with Christmas making it the highest grossing Nigerian film on a single day in 2022.

The theatrical run for the film came to an end on 13 April 2023, after 17 weeks at the box office with a gross box office of ₦668,423,056.

It finished as the highest-grossing Nigerian film of all time displacing Omo Ghetto: The Saga with a gross exceeding ₦640 million.

== Awards and nominations ==
Year	Award	Category	Recipient	Result	Ref
2023	Africa Magic Viewers' Choice Awards	Best Actress In A Comedy/TV Series	Mercy Johnson	Nominated	
2023	Africa Magic Viewers' Choice Awards	Best Actress In A Comedy/TV Series	Funke Akindele	Nominated	
2023	Africa Magic Viewers' Choice Awards	Best Actor In A Comedy/TV Series	Nkem Owoh	Nominated	
2023	Africa Magic Viewers' Choice Awards	Best Art Director	Olatunji Afolayan	Nominated	
2023	Africa Magic Viewers' Choice Awards	Best Picture Editor	Valentine Chukwuma	Nominated	
2023	Africa Magic Viewers' Choice Awards	Best Sound Editor	Kolade Morakinyo & Pius Fatoke	Nominated	
2023	Africa Magic Viewers' Choice Awards	Best Sound Track	Gbas Gbos by Tolu Obanro & Adam Songbird	Nominated	
2023	Africa Magic Viewers' Choice Awards	Best Make Up	Hakeem Effects Onilogbo & Jemila Sedik	Nominated	
2023	Africa Magic Viewers' Choice Awards	Best Writer	Funke Akindele, Jack'enneth Opukeme, Stephen Oluboyo & Jemine Edukugho	Nominated	
2023	Africa Magic Viewers' Choice Awards	Best Overall Movie	Funke Akindele	Nominated	
