= Chinyere Wilfred =

Nigerian Nollywood actress, television personality, and businesswoman

- Born: March 23, 1970 (age 56); Aguluezechukwu, Anambra State
- Education: Computer Science, Lagos State Polytechnic
- Occupation: Actress
- Years active: 1992–present
- Children: 3
- Relatives: Chinelo Mojekwu (sister)

Chinyere Wilfred // is a Nigerian actress and film producer.

== Early life ==
Wilfred was born on March 23, 1970, in Aguluezechukwu, Anambra State in Southeastern Nigeria. She is married and has three sons. She has a twin sister called Chinelo Mojekwu.

In 2022 she was a co-star in the Nigerian streaming series Diiche which was produced by James Omokwe and starring Uzoamaka Aniunoh. Her co-stars were Uzoamaka Onuoha, Gloria Young and Frank Konwea. The premier was in October, in Lagos, and was hosted by Chigul.

== Personal life ==
Chinyere Wilfred is Married to Mr. Wilfred. They got married in 1993 after dating for nine years. They have 3 sons their names are : Emeka Wilfred, Chijioke Wilfred and Chukwudi Wilfred.

== Education ==
Wilfred had Her Primary and Secondary School in Lagos State where she got her First Leaving School Certificate and West African Senior School Certificate. Afterwards, she earned Higher National Diploma (HND) in Computer Science from Lagos State Polytechnic.

== Career ==
Chinyere was involved in many theatre and stage shows in school. She joined the Nollywood industry in 1992 by acting in the movie TABOO. She has acted in over 200 Nollywood movies. She is known for playing the roles of a Queen, wife and Mother amongst others.

== Awards ==
- Nominee – Best Actress in a Supporting Role at the Africa Movie Academy Awards
- Best Actress of the Year at the Africa Magic Viewers' Choice Award
- Best Actress in a Leading Role at the Best of Nollywood Awards
- Best Actress in Nigeria at the City People Entertainment Awards

== Selected filmography ==
Date	Title	Role	Ref.
1994	Nneka the Pretty Serpent	Agnes	
2001	Children of Terror	Agnes	
2016	Rain of Hope		
2018	June	June's Mother	
2019	Mad About You	Mrs. Nzeka	
2020	Boundless Love		
2020	Mama Drama	Auntie	
2020	Rattlesnake: The Ahanna Story	Nancy	
2020	Special Package	Aunty Ure	
2021	Ponzi	Mrs.Olaoba	
2021	Lugard	Consul Francis Mama	
2021	Undying		
2021	African Messiah		
2021	Grim	Evelyn	
2022	Crossed Lines	Pastor Mrs. Bello	
2022	Diiche	Kesaandu Anyanwu	
2023	The Wedding Gambit	Mrs. Sandra	
2023	Malaika		
2024	JAPA	Wise Woman	
