= Uzoamaka Onuoha =

Nigerian actress

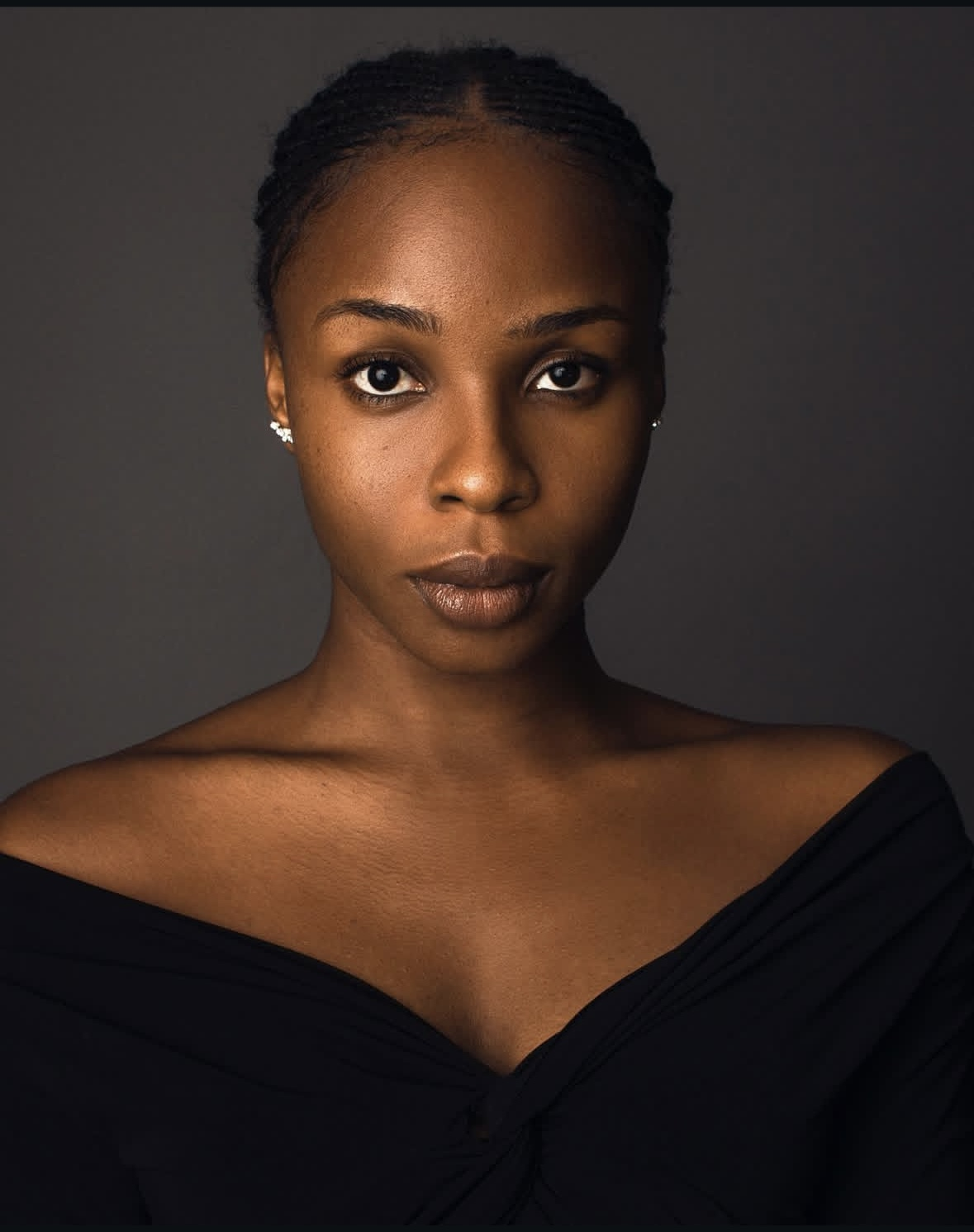
- Born: Uzoamaka Cynthia Ginikachukwu Onuoha; Lagos State, Nigeria
- Education: University of Nigeria, Nsukka
- Occupation: Actress
- Years active: 2018–present
- Known for: Diiche, Agemo

Uzoamaka Cynthia Ginikachukwu Onuoha is a Nigerian actress known for her work in film, television, and stage productions. She gained national recognition with her lead role in Diiche, Showmax's first Nigerian original limited series, which received seven nominations at the Africa Magic Viewers' Choice Awards (AMVCA) in 2023.

== Early life and education ==
Onuoha was born in Lagos State, Nigeria, and hails from Awo-Idemili in Orsu Local Government Area of Imo State. She studied at the University of Nigeria, Nsukka, graduating with a second-class upper degree in theatre and film studies. She further trained in screen acting at the EbonyLife Creative Academy under South African director Drikus Volschenk in 2021.

== Career ==
Year	Title	Role	Notes	Ref
2018	If I am President	Zina's team	Feature film	
2019	Ordinary Fellows	Efya	Feature film	
2020	Omugwo	Ada	Short film	
2021	Reflections	Dr. Asa	Short film	
2021	King of Boys: The Return of the King	Reporter	TV miniseries (episode 1)	
2021	Stories by Her		Short film	
2022	Blood Sisters (2022 TV series)	Hotel clerk	TV miniseries (episode 1)	
2022	Edge of Time	Isi		
2022	Country Love	Nneka	Short film	
2022	Diiche	Odiiche	Lead role; Showmax original series	
2022	Visa on Arrival	Kimberly	Africa Magic, season 1	
2022	Finding Diana	Aisha Coker	Premiered at Internet Governance Forum, Ethiopia	
2022	Flawsome	Diamond 2	Showmax season 1	
2023	A Sunday Affair	Teen Toyin		
2023	Obinmapu	Naza	Short film	
2023	Ndeeri		Short film	
2023	Oriaku: The Housewife		Short film	
2023	Swimming in a Sea of Trauma	Nkechi	Premiered at International Film Festival Rotterdam	
2023	Agemo	Lead role	Produced by Related Motion Moshood Obatula	
2023	Inside Life (2022 film)		Directed by Clarence Peters, also television adaptation	
2024	The Theory of Breakfast		TV miniseries	
2024	Peaceville			
2024	Toll-Free	Rita Daniels	Short film	
2024	Penance	Alice	Directed by Awal Rahmat; on Amazon Prime Video	
2024	Schooled	Didi	Produced by Ndani TV	
2025	Shall We Meet Tonight	Susan	Premiered at BFI Flare	

=== Stage work ===
Onuoha has also performed in prominent Nigerian theatrical productions:

- Folly of Men (directed by Joshua Alabi)
- Emotan (directed by William Benson)
- Chapters (Maduegbuna Productions)
- The Decision (staged at Terra Kulture)

== Awards and nominations ==
Year	Award/Event	Category	Work	Result	Ref
2024	AFRIFF	Best Female Performance	Agemo	Won	
2025	AMVCA	Best Lead Actress	Agemo	Nominated	
–	UNN Theatre Awards	Best Actress (Female Category)	General body of work	Nominated	
2025	Toronto International Film Nollywood Film Festival	Best Actress Nollywood/African Film Category	Agemo	Nominated	

== Personal life ==
Onuoha is fluent in English, Igbo, and Nigerian Pidgin. She volunteers with Clare Cares Foundation (CCF), a nonprofit organisation focused on youth empowerment in Nigeria. She resides in Lagos State.

== See also ==
- List of Nigerian actresses
- Cinema of Nigeria
- Africa Magic Viewers' Choice Awards
