= Ifeoma Chukwuogo =

Nigerian film producer and director

Ifeoma Nkiruka Chukwuogo (born 13 June 1992) is a Nigerian film producer and director. She is known for Phoenix Fury (2024), a film which earned her Best Director award at AFRIFF in 2024.

== Background ==
Chukwuogo produced her debut short film in 2013 but became a professional in 2015, after graduating from a film school. She directed Bariga Sugar, which is considered as her debut production.
