= Big Brother Africa season 8 =

Big Brother Africa
- Season 8
- No. of days: 91
- No. of housemates: 28
- Winner: Dillish
- Runner-up: Cleo

Season chronology
- ← Previous; Season 7 Next → Season 9

Big Brother Africa 8 (also known as Big Brother Africa: The Chase) was the eighth season of the Big Brother Africa reality television series, produced by Endemol for M-Net. It began on 26 May 2013, running for 91 days and ending on 25 August 2013. Ikponmwosa "IK" Osakioduwa came back to host the show for the fifth season in a row.

== Format ==
In this season, there were twenty-eight housemates who lived in two houses – The Ruby House and The Diamond House. Each week, two housemates would swap houses for the upcoming week until the merge was reached. The housemates were competing for US $300,000. This season, 28 participants from fourteen countries participated in the series. All fourteen countries were home to previous participants including Angola, Botswana, Ethiopia, Ghana, Kenya, Malawi, Namibia, Nigeria, Sierra Leone, South Africa, Tanzania, Uganda, Zambia and Zimbabwe. Kenyans in particular were urged to apply by the hosting channel.

== Housemates ==
On Day 1, twenty-eight housemates entered the House. Day 1 is also referred to as "Launch Night".

Name	Real/Full Name	Age	Occupation	Country	Day entered	Day exited	Status
Dillish	Dillish Peyavali Helena Matheus	22	Psychology Student	Namibia	1	91	Winner
Cleo	Clementina Mulenga	23	Artist	Zambia	1	91	Runner-up
Elikem	Elikem Kumordzie	24	Tailor and Actor	Ghana	1	91	3rd Place
Melvin	Melvin Ekenemchukwu Oduah	27	Model and Actor	Nigeria	1	91	4th Place
Beverly	Beverly Ada Mary Osu	21	Model	Nigeria	1	91	5th Place
Angelo	Angelo Collins	36	Dance Instructor	South Africa	1	84	Evicted
Bimp	Beamlak Tesfaye	23	Student	Ethiopia	1	84	Evicted
Feza	Feza Tadei Kessy	25	Recording Artist	Tanzania	1	77	Evicted
O'Neal	Zibanani Madumo	33	Radio Personality	Botswana	1	70	Evicted
Nando	Amir Murtazar Khan	22	Student	Tanzania	1	63	Ejected
Sulu	Sulupinsio Banda	31	Businessman	Zambia	1	63	Evicted
Annabel	Anne Magret Mbaru	24	Student and Fashion Designer	Kenya	1	63	Evicted
Pokello	Pokello Nare	27	Entrepreneur	Zimbabwe	1	56	Evicted
Bassey	Michael Bonny Bassey	22	Student, Actor, and Model	Sierra Leone	1	56	Evicted
Natasha	Natasha Annie Tonthola	26	Self-Employed	Malawi	1	49	Evicted
Selly	Selorm Galley	25	Actress	Ghana	1	49	Evicted
Hakeem	Munyaradzi Matthew Mandaza	22	Model	Zimbabwe	1	42	Evicted
Fatima	Fatima Nkata	30	TV Presenter	Malawi	1	42	Evicted
Bolt	Adrian Joseph Lewis	27	Businessman	Sierra Leone	1	35	Evicted
Maria	Maria Dhiginina Kauna Nepembe	24	Model and Radio Presenter	Namibia	1	35	Evicted
Betty	Betelehem Abera Esuendale	26	Teacher	Ethiopia	1	28	Evicted
Motamma	Motamma Kelebogile Sesinyi	26	Student	Botswana	1	28	Evicted
Neyll	Neyll De Brito	32	IT Coordinator	Angola	1	21	Evicted
Biguesas	Braulio Piatra	29	Student	Angola	1	21	Evicted
Koketso	Koketso Mogomotsi Modiba	26	Entrepreneur	South Africa	1	14	Evicted
LK4	Isaac Katwe Lugudde	28	Certified Public Accountant	Uganda	1	14	Evicted
Huddah	Sonie Alhuda Njoroge	21	Model	Kenya	1	7	Evicted
Denzel	Charles Mwiyeretsi	29	Radio and TV Show Host	Uganda	1	7	Evicted

== Twists ==
=== Emerald House ===
On day 21, Big Brother informed the housemates that there was a third house, supposedly called the "Emerald House". The Emerald House didn't actually exist; it was a deception to make housemates second-guess their chances of winning.

On day 48 during the Channel O party, Big Brother introduced six housemates from the "Emerald House": Alusa (Kenya), Busi (South Africa), Eveva (Zambia), Jazz (Kenya), JJ (Zimbabwe), and Sophie (Uganda). The introduction of these "new" housemates was intended to confuse the actual housemates when Big Brother sent them on a mission on Day 49.

On Wednesday, 10 May 2016, it has been reported that Eveva died from surgery complications from an accident that occurred in 2014. She is the second overall ex-housemate to die. The first was Goldie from Big Brother Africa 7 who died in 2013.

=== Power of No ===
This year there was a new twist called Power of No. Beginning on week 2, this new twist gave one housemate the opportunity to deny another housemate the opportunity to participate in the next Head of House Task.

On Week 10, Elikem won the Power of No. But, as he cheated in the task, Big Brother decided to veto him from the Head of House Competition.

Week	Ruby House		Diamond House	
Week	Power of No	Vetoed housemate	Power of No	Vetoed housemate
2	Cleo	Beverly	Hakeem	Dillish
3	Selly	Neyll	Fatima	Nando
4	Selly	Angelo	Hakeem	Annabel
5	Bolt	Sulu	Dillish	Hakeem
6	Natasha	Natasha	Beverly	Pokello
7	Angelo	Elikem	Cleo	Feza
8	Cleo	Feza	Beverly	Annabel
9	Melvin	Dillish	none	
10	Big Brother	Elikem	none	
11	Elikem	Bimp	none	
12	Angelo	Elikem	none	

=== House swap ===
This season, there was another twist added called the House Swap. In this twist, the two Houses play the Airtel Arena Games against each other. The Head of House of the winning House gets to choose two housemates from their House to go to the opposite House and bringing two housemates from the opposite House to their House.

Week	Winning House and HoH		Swapped Housemates	
Week	Winning House	HoH	Rubies to Diamonds	Diamonds to Rubies
1	Diamonds	Feza	Hakeem & Melvin	Denzel & Neyll
2	Rubies	Selly	Beverly & Biguesas	Angelo & Elikem
3	Rubies	Selly	Maria & Neyll	Fatima & Feza
4	Diamonds	Annabel	Cleo & Selly	Betty & Bolt
5	Rubies	Feza	Bassey & Pokello	Annabel & Maria
6	Rubies	Elikem	Annabel & Feza	Pokello & Selly
7	Diamonds	Melvin	Natasha & Selly	Cleo & Feza

== Nomination history ==
	Week 1	Week 2	Week 3	Week 4	Week 5	Week 6	Week 7	Week 8	Week 9	Week 10	Week 11	Week 12	Week 13
Dillish	Bolt, Huddah	Bolt, Hakeem	Bolt, Hakeem	Bolt, Hakeem	Hakeem, Selly	Nando, Cleo	Nando, Cleo	Bimp, Nando	Bimp, Nando	O'Neal, Feza	Feza, Bimp	Bimp, Elikem	Winner (Day 91)
Cleo	Selly, Hakeem	Selly, Biguesas	Pokello, Natasha	Bassey, Feza	Dillish, Nando	Pokello, Beverly	Melvin, Beverly	Pokello, Elikem	Melvin, Beverly	Feza, Elikem	Feza, Beverly	Beverly, Elikem	Runner-Up (Day 91)
Elikem	Huddah, Betty	Annabel, Nando	Natasha, Sulu	Natasha, Pokello	Sulu, Natasha	O'Neal, Natasha	Natasha, Sulu	Sulu, Angelo	Nando, Feza	O'Neal, Feza	Bimp, Feza	Angelo, Bimp	3rd Place (Day 91)
Melvin	Cleo, Natasha	Betty, Bolt	Biguesas, Annabel	Annabel, Betty	Nando, Bimp	Cleo, Pokello	Cleo, Nando	Bimp, Annabel	Bimp, O'Neal	Elikem, O'Neal	Beverly, Feza	Elikem, Bimp	4th Place (Day 91)
Beverly	Selly, Natasha	Biguesas, Sulu	Bolt, Biguesas	Betty, Bolt	Annabel, Selly	Nando, Pokello	Annabel, Cleo	Annabel, Bassey	Annabel, O'Neal	O'Neal, Feza	Cleo, Dillish	Cleo, Dillish	5th Place (Day 91)
Angelo	Denzel, Neyll	Bolt, Feza	Natasha, O'Neal	Elikem, Fatima	Elikem, Natasha	Natasha, Fatima	Elikem, Natasha	Feza, Cleo	Elikem, Feza	Elikem, Feza	Cleo, Bimp	Bimp, Elikem	Evicted (Day 84)
Bimp	Elikem, Huddah	Annabel, Dillish	Bolt, Beverly	Annabel, Maria	Maria, Annabel	Pokello, Selly	Annabel, Melvin	Annabel, Dillish	Elikem, Annabel	Melvin, Elikem	Elikem, Dillish	Elikem, Dillish	Evicted (Day 84)
Feza	Betty, Denzel	Betty, Hakeem	Biguesas, Melvin	Natasha, Elikem	Pokello, Natasha	Fatima, Elikem	Annabel, Cleo	Elikem, Pokello	Elikem, Cleo	Cleo, Dillish	Elikem, Cleo	Evicted (Day 77)	
O'Neal	Bassey, Hakeem	Neyll, LK4	Pokello, Neyll	Pokello, Elikem	Sulu, Bassey	Elikem, Fatima	Pokello, Elikem	Pokello, Elikem	Elikem, Cleo	Cleo, Dillish	Evicted (Day 70)		
Nando	Denzel, Huddah	Motamma, Melvin	Betty, Motamma	Maria, Motamma	Dillish, Maria	Cleo, Selly	Melvin, Cleo	Melvin, Dillish	Elikem, Sulu	Ejected (Day 63)			
Sulu	Bassey, Hakeem	Neyll, Pokello	Angelo, Pokello	Fatima, Pokello	Bolt, Fatima	Annabel, Fatima	Natasha, Pokello	Pokello, Angelo	Annabel, Dillish	Evicted (Day 63)			
Annabel	Fatima, Elikem	Bolt, Betty	Bolt, Motamma	Bolt, Melvin	Hakeem, Beverly	Fatima, Elikem	Bimp, Cleo	Beverly, Bimp	Beverly, Cleo	Evicted (Day 63)			
Pokello	Koketso, Selly	Biguesas, Koketso	Selly, O'Neal	Sulu, Selly	Bolt, Sulu	Bimp, Nando	Natasha, Sulu	Cleo, Feza	Evicted (Day 56)				
Bassey	Biguesas, O'Neal	LK4, Biguesas	Selly, Elikem	Natasha, Cleo	Feza, Angelo	Melvin, Bimp	Annabel, Feza	Bimp, Annabel	Evicted (Day 56)				
Natasha	Beverly, Pokello	Beverly, Bassey	Pokello, Bassey	Elikem, Angelo	Elikem, Bolt	Feza, O'Neal	Elikem, Pokello	Evicted (Day 49)					
Selly	Cleo, Bassey	LK4, Koketso	Pokello, Natasha	Pokello, Natasha	Annabel, Dillish	Hakeem, Bimp	O'Neal, Pokello	Evicted (Day 49)					
Hakeem	Bassey, Sulu	Dillish, Feza	Dillish, Nando	Dillish, Motamma	Dillish, Annabel	Selly, Dillish	Evicted (Day 42)						
Fatima	Huddah, Annabel	Hakeem, Feza	Betty, Annabel	Pokello, Sulu	Pokello, O'Neal	Feza, Annabel	Evicted (Day 42)						
Bolt	Denzel, Neyll	Dillish, Annabel	Nando, Feza	Annabel, Nando	Sulu, Natasha	Evicted (Day 35)							
Maria	Selly, Natasha	Biguesas, Natasha	Natasha, Bassey	Bolt, Betty	Hakeem, Nando	Evicted (Day 35)							
Betty	Annabel, Denzel	Elikem, Feza	Nando, Feza	Nando, Dillish	Evicted (Day 28)								
Motamma	Elikem, Huddah	Hakeem, Bolt	Nando, Biguesas	Hakeem, Nando	Evicted (Day 28)								
Neyll	Denzel, Huddah	Maria, LK4	O'Neal, Sulu	Evicted (Day 21)									
Biguesas	Bassey, Selly	LK4, Maria	Dillish, Bolt	Evicted (Day 21)									
Koketso	Selly, Maria	Biguesas, Selly	Evicted (Day 14)										
LK4	Bassey, Biguesas	Neyll, Biguesas	Evicted (Day 14)										
Huddah	Elikem, Fatima	Evicted (Day 7)											
Denzel	Bolt, Dillish	Evicted (Day 7)											
Head of House	Beverly; Feza	Selly; Betty	Selly; Melvin	Bassey; Annabel	Feza; Nando	Elikem; Melvin	O'Neal; ~~Hakeem~~; Melvin	Sulu; Bimp	Bimp	Elikem	Beverly	Elikem	~~Bimp~~; Melvin
Up for eviction	Betty, Denzel, Huddah, Natasha, Selly	Dillish, Feza, Hakeem, Koketso, LK4	Annabel, Biguesas, Natasha, Neyll, Pokello	Betty, Bolt, Elikem, Motamma, Nando, Natasha, O'Neal	Annabel, Bolt, Dillish, Hakeem, Maria, Natasha, Pokello	Angelo, Bimp, Cleo, Fatima, Hakeem, Nando, Pokello	Annabel, Cleo, Melvin, Natasha, Pokello, Selly	Angelo, Annabel, Bassey, Dillish, Pokello	Annabel, Elikem, Sulu	Bimp, Feza, O'Neal	Cleo, Dillish, Feza	Angelo, Bimp, Dillish	Beverly, Cleo, Dillish, Elikem, Melvin
Ejected	none								Nando	none			
Survived Eviction	Betty; 5 of 15 votes to save Natasha; 3 of 15 votes to save Selly; 3 of 15 votes to save	Hakeem; 6 of 15 votes to save Dillish; 3 of 15 votes to save Feza; 3 of 15 votes to save	Pokello; 8 of 15 votes to save Annabel; 4 of 15 votes to save Natasha; 2 of 15 votes to save	Nando; 5 of 15 votes to save O'Neal; 4 of 15 votes to save Natasha; 3 of 15 votes to save Bolt; 1 of 15 votes to save Elikem; 1 of 15 votes to save	Dillish; 4 of 15 votes to save Pokello; 4 of 15 votes to save Annabel; 3 of 15 votes to save Hakeem; 1 of 15 votes to save Natasha; 1 of 15 votes to save	Angelo; 4 of 15 votes to save Pokello; 4 of 15 votes to save Nando; 3 of 15 votes to save Bimp; 2 of 15 votes to save Cleo; 1 of 15 votes to save	Melvin; 5 of 15 votes to save Annabel; 3 of 15 votes to save Cleo; 2 of 15 votes to save Pokello; 2 of 15 votes to save	Angelo; 5 of 15 votes to save Annabel; 3 of 15 votes to save Dillish; 3 of 15 votes to save	Elikem; 6 of 15 votes to save	Bimp; 10 of 15 votes to save Feza; 3 of 15 votes to save	Dillish; 7 of 15 votes to save Cleo; 4 of 15 votes to save	Dillish; 7 of 15 votes to save	Dillish; 5 of 15 votes to win
Evicted	Denzel; 2 of 15 votes to save Huddah; 2 of 15 votes to save	Koketso; 2 of 15 votes to save LK4; 1 of 15 votes to save	Neyll; 1 of 15 votes to save Biguesas no votes to save	Betty; 1 of 15 votes to save Motamma no votes to save	Bolt; 1 of 15 votes to save Maria; 1 of 15 votes to save	Fatima; 1 of 15 votes to save Hakeem no votes to save	Natasha; 2 of 15 votes to save Selly; 1 of 15 votes to save	Bassey; 2 of 15 votes to save Pokello; 2 of 15 votes to save	Sulu; 6 of 15 votes to save Annabel; 3 of 15 votes to save	O'Neal; 2 of 15 votes to save	Feza; 4 of 15 votes to save	Angelo; 4 of 15 votes to save Bimp; 4 of 15 votes to save	Cleo; 4 of 15 votes to win
Evicted	Denzel; 2 of 15 votes to save Huddah; 2 of 15 votes to save	Koketso; 2 of 15 votes to save LK4; 1 of 15 votes to save	Neyll; 1 of 15 votes to save Biguesas no votes to save	Betty; 1 of 15 votes to save Motamma no votes to save	Bolt; 1 of 15 votes to save Maria; 1 of 15 votes to save	Fatima; 1 of 15 votes to save Hakeem no votes to save	Natasha; 2 of 15 votes to save Selly; 1 of 15 votes to save	Bassey; 2 of 15 votes to save Pokello; 2 of 15 votes to save	Sulu; 6 of 15 votes to save Annabel; 3 of 15 votes to save	O'Neal; 2 of 15 votes to save	Feza; 4 of 15 votes to save	Angelo; 4 of 15 votes to save Bimp; 4 of 15 votes to save	Elikem; 3 of 15 votes to win
Evicted	Denzel; 2 of 15 votes to save Huddah; 2 of 15 votes to save	Koketso; 2 of 15 votes to save LK4; 1 of 15 votes to save	Neyll; 1 of 15 votes to save Biguesas no votes to save	Betty; 1 of 15 votes to save Motamma no votes to save	Bolt; 1 of 15 votes to save Maria; 1 of 15 votes to save	Fatima; 1 of 15 votes to save Hakeem no votes to save	Natasha; 2 of 15 votes to save Selly; 1 of 15 votes to save	Bassey; 2 of 15 votes to save Pokello; 2 of 15 votes to save	Sulu; 6 of 15 votes to save Annabel; 3 of 15 votes to save	O'Neal; 2 of 15 votes to save	Feza; 4 of 15 votes to save	Angelo; 4 of 15 votes to save Bimp; 4 of 15 votes to save	Melvin; 2 of 15 votes to win Beverly; 1 of 15 votes to win

Legend:
Red names indicate Ruby housemates.
Blue names indicate Diamond housemates.

== Nominations total received ==
	Week 1	Week 2	Week 3	Week 4	Week 5	Week 6	Week 7	Week 8	Week 9	Week 10	Week 11	Week 12	Week 13	Total
Dillish	1	3	3	2	4	1	0	2	1	2	2	2	Winner	23
Cleo	2	0	0	1	0	3	6	2	3	2	3	1	Runner-Up	23
Elikem	4	1	1	4	2	3	3	3	5	4	2	5	3rd Place	37
Melvin	0	1	1	1	0	1	3	1	1	1	0	0	4th Place	10
Beverly	1	1	1	0	1	1	1	1	2	0	2	1	5th Place	12
Angelo	0	0	1	1	1	0	0	2	0	0	0	1	Evicted	6
Bimp	0	0	0	0	1	3	1	4	2	0	3	4	Evicted	18
Feza	0	4	1	1	1	2	1	2	2	5	4	Evicted		23
O'Neal	1	0	3	0	1	2	1	0	2	4	Evicted			14
Nando	0	1	3	3	3	3	2	1	2	Ejected				18
Sulu	1	1	2	2	4	0	2	1	1	Evicted				14
Annabel	2	3	3	3	4	2	4	4	3	Evicted				28
Pokello	1	1	5	5	2	4	4	4	Evicted					26
Bassey	6	1	2	1	1	0	0	1	Evicted					12
Natasha	3	1	5	4	4	2	4	Evicted						23
Selly	6	2	2	1	2	3	0	Evicted						16
Hakeem	3	4	1	2	3	1	Evicted							14
Fatima	2	0	0	2	1	5	Evicted							10
Bolt	2	5	5	4	3	Evicted								19
Maria	1	2	0	2	2	Evicted								7
Betty	2	3	2	3	Evicted									10
Motamma	0	1	2	2	Evicted									5
Neyll	2	3	1	Evicted										6
Biguesas	2	7	4	Evicted										13
Koketso	1	2	Evicted											3
LK4	0	5	Evicted											5
Huddah	7	Evicted												7
Denzel	6	Evicted												6

Legend:
Red names indicate Ruby housemates.
Blue names indicate Diamond housemates.
Head of House of the week.

== Voting history ==
	Week 1	Week 2	Week 3	Week 4	Week 5	Week 6	Week 7	Week 8	Week 9	Week 10	Week 11	Week 12	Week 13
Angola	Betty	Koketso	Neyll	O'Neal	Pokello	Angelo	Melvin	Angelo	Sulu	Bimp	Dillish	Bimp	Dillish
Botswana	Betty	Hakeem	Pokello	O'Neal	Dillish	Angelo	Cleo	Angelo	Sulu	O'Neal	Feza	Angelo	Cleo
Ethiopia	Betty	Dillish	Annabel	Betty	Dillish	Bimp	Natasha	Dillish	Elikem	Bimp	Dillish	Bimp	Beverly
Ghana	Selly	Feza	Pokello	Elikem	Pokello	Pokello	Selly	Pokello	Elikem	Bimp	Dillish	Dillish	Elikem
Kenya	Huddah	Hakeem	Annabel	Nando	Annabel	Nando	Annabel	Annabel	Annabel	Feza	Feza	Dillish	Dillish
Malawi	Natasha	Hakeem	Natasha	Natasha	Natasha	Fatima	Natasha	Dillish	Sulu	Bimp	Cleo	Bimp	Cleo
Namibia	Betty	Dillish	Pokello	Nando	Maria	Bimp	Melvin	Dillish	Sulu	Bimp	Dillish	Dillish	Dillish
Nigeria	Selly	Dillish	Pokello	Nando	Dillish	Pokello	Melvin	Bassey	Elikem	Bimp	Dillish	Dillish	Melvin
Sierra Leone	Betty	Feza	Pokello	Bolt	Bolt	Pokello	Melvin	Bassey	Elikem	Feza	Dillish	Dillish	Elikem
South Africa	Denzel	Koketso	Pokello	O'Neal	Pokello	Angelo	Pokello	Angelo	Sulu	O'Neal	Cleo	Angelo	Cleo
Tanzania	Huddah	Feza	Annabel	Nando	Annabel	Nando	Annabel	Annabel	Annabel	Feza	Feza	Bimp	Dillish
Uganda	Denzel	LK4	Annabel	Nando	Annabel	Nando	Annabel	Annabel	Annabel	Bimp	Feza	Dillish	Dillish
Zambia	Natasha	Hakeem	Natasha	Natasha	Hakeem	Cleo	Cleo	Angelo	Sulu	Bimp	Cleo	Angelo	Cleo
Zimbabwe	Natasha	Hakeem	Pokello	Natasha	Pokello	Pokello	Pokello	Pokello	Elikem	Bimp	Cleo	Dillish	Elikem
Rest of Africa	Selly	Hakeem	Pokello	O'Neal	Dillish	Angelo	Melvin	Angelo	Elikem	Bimp	Dillish	Angelo	Melvin

Survivor(s) of the vote.

== Nomination and voting notes ==
=== Week 1 ===
On Day 1, nominations occurred. Housemates were only allowed to nominate people living in their same house.

Ruby House

The initial nominees were Bassey and Selly.
Head of House Beverly decided to save Bassey and replace him with Natasha.
Natasha and Selly became the final nominees list.

Diamond House

The initial nominees were Denzel, Elikem and Huddah.
Head of House Feza decided to save Elikem and replace him with Betty.
Betty, Denzel, and Huddah became the final nominees list.

Therefore, Betty, Denzel, Huddah, Natasha, and Selly were up for eviction for the week.

This week, viewers were voting for the housemate they wanted to save:

- Betty received 5 votes to save: Angola, Botswana, Ethiopia, Namibia and Sierra Leone.
- Natasha received 3 votes to save: Malawi, Zambia and Zimbabwe.
- Selly received 3 votes to save: Ghana, Nigeria and Rest of Africa.
- Denzel received 2 votes to save: South Africa and Uganda.
- Huddah received 2 votes to save: Kenya and Tanzania.

On Day 7, Denzel and Huddah were evicted.

=== Week 2 ===
On Day 8, nominations occurred. Housemates were only allowed to nominate people from their own house.

Ruby House

The initial nominees were Biguesas and LK4.
Head of House Selly decided to save Biguesas and replace him with Koketso.
Koketso and LK4 became the final nominees list.

Diamond House

The initial nominees were Bolt, Dillish, and Hakeem.
Head of House Betty decided to save Bolt and replace him with Feza.
Dillish, Feza, and Hakeem became the final nominees list.

Therefore, Dillish, Feza, Hakeem, Koketso, and LK4 were up for eviction for the week.

Viewer votes for the housemate they wanted to save:

- Hakeem received 6 votes to save: Botswana, Kenya, Malawi, Zambia, Zimbabwe and Rest of Africa.
- Dillish received 3 votes to save: Ethiopia, Namibia and Nigeria.
- Feza received 3 votes to save: Ghana, Sierra Leone and Tanzania.
- Koketso received 2 votes to save: Angola and South Africa.
- LK4 received 1 vote to save: Uganda.

On Day 14, LK4 and Koketso were evicted.

=== Week 3 ===
On Day 15, nominations occurred. Housemates were only allowed to nominate people living in their own house.

Ruby House

The initial nominees were Natasha, O'Neal, and Pokello.
Head of House Selly decided to save O'Neal and replace him with Neyll.
Natasha, Neyll, and Pokello became the final nominees list.

Diamond House

The initial nominees were Biguesas and Bolt.
Head of House Melvin decided to save Bolt and replace him with Annabel.
Annabel and Biguesas became the final nominees list.

Therefore, Annabel, Biguesas, Natasha, Neyll, and Pokello were up for eviction for the week.

The results of viewer voting for the housemate they wanted to save:

- Pokello received 8 votes to save: Botswana, Ghana, Namibia, Nigeria, Sierra Leone, South Africa, Zimbabwe and Rest of Africa.
- Annabel received 4 votes to save: Ethiopia, Kenya, Tanzania and Uganda.
- Natasha received 2 votes to save: Malawi and Zambia.
- Neyll received 1 vote to save: Angola.
- Biguesas received no votes to save.

On Day 21, Biguesas and Neyll were evicted.

=== Week 4 ===
On Day 22, nominations occurred. Housemates were only allowed to nominate people from their own house.

Ruby House

The initial nominees were Elikem, Natasha, and Pokello.
Head of House Bassey decided to save Pokello and replace her with O'Neal.
Elikem, Natasha, and O'Neal became the final nominees list.

Diamond House

The initial nominees were Annabel, Betty, Bolt, and Nando.
Head of House Annabel decided to save herself and replace herself with Motamma.
Betty, Bolt, Motamma, and Nando became the final nominees list.

Therefore, Betty, Bolt, Elikem, Motamma, Nando, Natasha, and O'Neal were up for eviction for the week.

The results of viewers voting to save a housemate:

- Nando received 5 votes to save: Kenya, Namibia, Nigeria, Tanzania and Uganda.
- O'Neal received 4 votes to save: Angola, Botswana, South Africa and Rest of Africa.
- Natasha received 3 votes to save: Malawi, Zambia and Zimbabwe.
- Betty receive 1 vote* to save: Ethiopia.
- Bolt received 1 vote* to save: Sierra Leone.
- Elikem received 1 vote* to save: Ghana.
- Motamma received no votes to save.

*The tie-breaker rule applied to Betty, Bolt and Elikem where the number of votes for the housemate were divided by the 15 regions to get the average percentage. Betty had the lowest average percentage.

On Day 28, Motamma and Betty were evicted.

=== Week 5 ===
On Day 29, nominations occurred. Housemates were only allowed to nominate people from their own house.

Ruby House

The initial nominees were Bolt, Natasha, and Sulu.
Head of House Feza decided to save Sulu and replace him with Pokello.
Bolt, Natasha, and Pokello became the final nominees list.

Diamond House

The initial nominees were Annabel, Dillish, Hakeem, and Nando.
Head of House Nando decided to save himself and replace himself with Maria.
Annabel, Dillish, Hakeem, and Maria became the final nominees list.

Therefore, Annabel, Bolt, Dillish, Hakeem, Maria, Natasha, and Pokello were up for eviction for the week.

Results of viewer voting to save housemates:

- Dillish received 4 votes to save: Botswana, Ethiopia, Nigeria and Rest of Africa.
- Pokello received 4 votes to save: Angola, Ghana, South Africa and Zimbabwe.
- Annabel received 3 votes to save: Kenya, Tanzania and Uganda.
- Bolt received 1 vote* to save: Sierra Leone.
- Hakeem received 1 vote* to save: Zambia.
- Maria received 1 vote* to save: Namibia.
- Natasha received 1 vote* to save: Malawi.

*The tie-breaker rule applied to Bolt, Hakeem, Maria, and Natasha where the number of votes for the housemate were divided by the 15 regions to get the average percentage. Bolt and Maria had the lowest average percentages.

On Day 35, Maria and Bolt were evicted.

=== Week 6 ===
On Day 36, nominations occurred. Housemates were only allowed to nominate people from their own house

Ruby House

The initial nominees were Elikem and Fatima.
Head of House Elikem decided to save himself and replace himself with Angelo.
Angelo and Fatima became the final nominees list.

Diamond House

The initial nominees were Bimp, Cleo, Nando, Pokello, and Selly.
Head of House Melvin decided to save Selly and replace her with Hakeem.
Bimp, Cleo, Hakeem, Nando, and Pokello became the final nominees list.

Therefore, Angelo, Bimp, Cleo, Fatima, Hakeem, Nando, and Pokello were up for eviction for the week.

Results of viewer voting to save housemates:

- Angelo received 4 votes to save: Angola, Botswana, South Africa and Rest of Africa.
- Pokello received 4 votes to save: Ghana, Nigeria, Sierra Leone and Zimbabwe.
- Nando received 3 votes to save: Kenya, Tanzania and Uganda.
- Bimp received 2 votes to save: Ethiopia and Namibia.
- Cleo received 1 vote* to save: Zambia.
- Fatima received 1 vote* to save: Malawi.
- Hakeem received no votes to save.

*The tie-breaker rule applied to Cleo and Fatima where the number of votes for the housemate were divided by the 15 regions to get the average percentage. Fatima had the lowest average percentage.

On Day 42, Fatima and Hakeem were evicted.

=== Week 7 ===
On Day 43, nominations occurred. Housemates were only allowed to nominate people from their own house.

Ruby House

The initial nominees were Elikem, Natasha, and Pokello.
Head of House O'Neal decided to save Elikem and replace him with Selly.
Natasha, Pokello, and Selly became the final nominees list.

Diamond House

The initial nominees were Annabel, Cleo, and Melvin.
Head of House Melvin decided to leave the nominations as they were.
Annabel, Cleo, and Melvin became the final nominees list.

Therefore, Annabel, Cleo, Melvin, Natasha, Pokello, and Selly were up for eviction for the week.

The results of viewer votes to save housemates:

- Melvin received 5 votes to save: Angola, Namibia, Nigeria, Sierra Leone and Rest of Africa.
- Annabel received 3 votes to save: Kenya, Tanzania and Uganda.
- Cleo received 2 votes* to save: Botswana and Zambia.
- Natasha received 2 votes* to save: Ethiopia and Malawi.
- Pokello received 2 votes* to save: South Africa and Zimbabwe.
- Selly received 1 vote to save: Ghana.

*The tie-breaker rule applied to Cleo, Natasha and Pokello where the number of votes for the housemate were divided by the 15 regions to get the average percentage. Natasha had the lowest average percentage.

On Day 49, Selly and Natasha were evicted.

=== Week 8 ===
On Day 50, nominations occurred. Housemates were only allowed to nominate people from their own house.

Ruby House

The initial nominees were Elikem and Pokello.
Head of House Sulu decided to save Elikem and replace him with Angelo.
Angelo and Pokello became the final nominees list.

Diamond House

The initial nominees were Annabel, Bimp, and Dillish.
Head of House Bimp decided to save himself and replace himself with Bassey.
Annabel, Bassey, and Dillish became the final nominees list.

Therefore, Angelo, Annabel, Bassey, Dillish and Pokello were up for eviction for the week.

The results of viewer voting to save housemates:

- Angelo received 5 votes to save: Angola, Botswana, South Africa, Zambia and Rest of Africa.
- Annabel received 3 votes to save: Kenya, Tanzania and Uganda.
- Dillish received 3 votes to save: Ethiopia, Malawi and Namibia.
- Bassey received 2 votes to save: Nigeria and Sierra Leone.
- Pokello received 2 votes to save: Ghana and Zimbabwe.

On Day 56, Bassey and Pokello were evicted.

=== Week 9 ===
On Day 57, nominations occurred. All housemates were living in the Ruby House after the houses merged on Day 54.

The initial nominees were Annabel, Cleo, and Elikem.
Head of House Bimp decided to save Cleo and replace her with Sulu.
Annabel, Elikem, and Sulu became the final nominees list.

Therefore, Annabel, Elikem, and Sulu were up for eviction for the week.

The results of viewer voting to save housemates:

- Elikem received 6 votes* to save: Ethiopia, Ghana, Nigeria, Sierra Leone, Zimbabwe and Rest of Africa.
- Sulu received 6 votes* to save: Angola, Botswana, Malawi, Namibia, South Africa and Zambia.
- Annabel received 3 votes to save: Kenya, Tanzania and Uganda.

*The tie-breaker rule applied to Elikem and Sulu where the number of votes for the housemate were divided by the 15 regions to get the average percentage. Sulu had the lowest average percentage.

On Day 63, Annabel and Sulu were evicted.
On the same day, Big Brother ejected Nando for being violent towards Elikem.

=== Week 10 ===
On Day 64, nominations occurred.

The initial nominees were Eliken, Feza, and O'Neal.
Head of House Elikem decided to save himself and replace himself with Bimp.
Bimp, Feza, and O'Neal became the final nominees list.

Therefore, Bimp, Feza, and O'Neal were up for eviction for the week.

The results of viewer voting to save housemates:

- Bimp received 10 votes to save: Angola, Ethiopia, Ghana, Malawi, Namibia, Nigeria, Uganda, Zambia, Zimbabwe and Rest of Africa.
- Feza received 3 votes to save: Kenya, Sierra Leone and Tanzania.
- O'Neal received 2 votes to save: Botswana and South Africa.

On Day 70, O'Neal was evicted.

=== Week 11 ===
On Day 71, nominations occurred.

The initial nominees were Bimp, Cleo, and Feza.
Head of House Beverly decided to save Bimp and replace him with Dillish.
Cleo, Dillish, and Feza became the final nominees list.

Therefore, Cleo, Dillish, and Feza were up for eviction for the week.

The results of viewer voting to save housemates:

- Dillish received 7 votes to save: Angola, Ethiopia, Ghana, Namibia, Nigeria, Sierra Leone and Rest of Africa.
- Cleo received 4 votes* to save: Malawi, South Africa, Zambia and Zimbabwe.
- Feza received 4 votes* to save: Botswana, Kenya, Tanzania and Uganda.

*The tie-breaker rule applied to Cleo and Feza where the number of votes for the housemate were divided by the 15 regions to get the average percentage. Feza had the lowest average percentage.

On Day 77, Feza was evicted.

=== Week 12 ===
On Day 78, nominations occurred.

The initial nominees were Bimp, Dillish, and Elikem.
Head of House Elikem decided to save himself and replaces himself with Angelo.
Angelo, Bimp, and Dillish became the final nominees list.

Therefore, Angelo, Bimp, and Dillish were up for eviction for the week.

The results of viewer voting to save housemates:

- Dillish received 7 votes to save: Ghana, Kenya, Namibia, Nigeria, Sierra Leone, Uganda and Zimbabwe.
- Angelo received 4 votes to save: Botswana, South Africa, Zambia and Rest of Africa.
- Bimp received 4 votes to save: Angola, Ethiopia, Malawi and Tanzania.

On Day 84, Bimp and Angelo were evicted.

=== Week 13 ===
Beverly, Cleo, Dillish, Elikem, and Melvin were the finalists of the season. The final five were competing for the grand prize of US$300,000.

The results of viewer voting for the prize money:

- Dillish won the season with 5 votes to win: Angola, Kenya, Namibia, Tanzania and Uganda.
- Cleo became the runner-up with 4 votes to win: Botswana, Malawi, South Africa and Zambia.
- Elikem finished in 3rd place with 3 votes to win: Ghana, Sierra Leone and Zimbabwe.
- Melvin finished in 4th place with 2 votes to win: Nigeria and Rest of Africa.
- Beverly finished in 5th place with 1 vote to win: Ethiopia.

Dillish won 2013's The Chase season after getting the most votes with 5 country votes.
