= Anikulapo =

Aníkúlápó is a 2022 Nigerian film. It may also refer to:

== Surname ==
Anikulapo is a surname popular in Nigeria. Notable people with this surname include:

=== Ransome-Kuti family ===
- Fela Aníkúlápó-Kuti (1938–1997), Nigerian musician and activist
- Olufemi Anikulapo Kuti (born 1962), Nigerian musician
- Funmilayo Anikulapo-Kuti (1900–1978), Nigerian educator and activist
- Oluseun Anikulapo Kuti
- Yeni Anikulapo-Kuti (born 1961), Nigerian dancer and singer

=== Other ===
- Jahman Anikulapo (born 1963), Nigerian journalist
