= 2014 Golden Icons Academy Movie Awards =

Awards ceremony

The 2014 Golden Icons Academy Movie Awards was held at Stafford Center on 25 October 2014. The event was hosted by comedian, Julius Agwu.

== Awards ==
=== Best Motion Picture ===
- A Mile from Home
- Iyore
- Being Mrs Elliot
- Apaye
- Accident (2013 film)
- Dining with a Long Spoon

=== Best Drama ===
- Murder at Prime Suites
- Sisters at War
- Black Silhouette
- Knocking on Heaven's Door (2014 film)
- Accident (2013 film)
- Dark Side
- A Mile from Home

=== Best Film (Indigenous) ===
- Akan
- Sekunola
- Chetanna
- 30 Days in Atlanta
- Sundiata

=== Best Film (Comedy) ===
- Hustlers
- 30 Days in Atlanta
- Visa Lottery
- A Wish
- Nkasi the Village Fighter
- Airline Babes

=== Best On-Screen Duo ===
- Rita Dominic & Joseph Benjamin (actor) – Iyore
- Ayo Makun & Ramsey Nouah – 30 Days in Atlanta
- Belinda Effah & Kanayo O. Kanayo – Apaye
- Clarion Chukwura & Mercy Johnson – Hustlers
- Nadia Buari & Jim Iyke – The Diary of Imogen Brown
- Uche Jombo & Patience Ozokwor – After the Proposal
- Tope Tedela & Chiedozie Nzeribe – A Mile from Home

=== Best Actor ===
- Nonso Diobi – Last Three Digits
- Joseph Benjamin (actor) – Iyore
- Bob-Manuel Udokwu – Dining with a Long spoon
- Ramsey Nouah – 30 Days in Atlanta
- Kalu Ikeagwu – Accident (2013 film)
- Kanayo O. Kanayo – Apaye
- Majid Michel – Being Mrs Elliot

=== Best Actress ===
- Nse Ikpe Etim – Purple Rose
- Rita Dominic – Iyore
- Chioma Chukwuka – Accident (2013 film)
- Omoni Oboli – Being Mrs Elliot
- Jackie Appiah – Sisters at War
- Ini Edo – Nkasi the Village Fighter
- Clarion Chukwura – Apaye

=== Most Promising Actor ===
- Daniel Lloyd – Stripped
- Prince Mingle – Diary of Imogen Brown
- McCarthy Nonwani – Chetanna
- Shawn Faqua – Lagos Cougars
- Tope Tedela – A Mile from Home
- Blossom Chukwujekwu – Knocking on Heaven's Door (2014 film)
- Emor Ekpenyong – Make a Move

=== Most Promising Actress ===
- Sylvia Udeogu – Dark Side
- Sonia Ibrahim – Number One Fan
- Ivie Okujaye – Black Silhouette
- Grace Johnson – All that Glitters
- Adesua Etomi – Knocking on Heaven's Door (2014 film)
- Diana Yekini – Lagos Cougars
- Kafui Danku – Devil in a Dress

=== Best Supporting Actor ===
- Femi Jacobs – Dreamwalker
- Uti Nwachukwu – Don’t Cry for me
- Wale Adebayo – Make a Move
- Frederick Leonard (Nigerian actor) – Accident (2013 film)
- Ayo Makun – Being Mrs Elliot
- Eddie Watson – Sisters at War
- Anthony Monjaro – After the Proposal

=== Best Supporting Actress ===
- Ebele Okaro – Chetanna
- Belinda Effah – Apaye
- Susan Peters – Don’t Cry for Me
- Roselyn Ngissah – Purple Rose
- Okawa Shaznay – Sisters at War
- Uru Eke – Dining with a Long Spoon
- Tana Adelana – Dream walker

=== Best Comedic Act ===
- Patience Ozokwor – After the Proposal
- Lepacious Bose – Being Mrs Elliot
- Ini Edo – Nkasi The Village Fighter
- Mercy Johnson – Hustlers
- Eniola Badmus – Airline Babes
- Bishop Umeh – Visa Lottery
- Ayo Makun – 30 Days in Atlanta

=== Best Screenplay ===
- Last Three Digits
- 30 Days in Atlanta
- Accident (2013 film)
- Black Silhouette
- Dining with a Long Spoon
- Make a Move

=== Best Director ===
- Eneaji Chris EnenG – Murder at Prime Suites
- Teco Benson – Accident (2013 film)
- Frank Rajah Arase – Iyore
- Omoni Oboli – Being Mrs Elliot
- Desmond Elliot – Apaye
- Robert Peters – 30 Days in Atlanta
- Eric Aghimien – A Mile from Home

=== Producer of the Year ===
- Eric Aghimien – A Mile from Home
- Juliet Ibrahim – Number One Fan
- Frank Rajah Arase & Kwame Boadu – Iyore
- Abdul Salam Mumuni – Sisters at War
- Emem Isong – Apaye
- Omoni Oboli & Nnamdi Oboli – Being Mrs Elliot
- Ayo Makun & Dr. Kulah – 30 Days in Atlanta

=== Best Edited Film ===
- Being Mrs Elliot
- Accident (2013 film)
- Apaye
- One Last Word
- Murder at Prime Suites
- A Mile from Home

=== Best Cinematography ===
- Murder at Prime Suites
- Iyore
- 30 Days in Atlanta
- Dining with a Long Spoon
- A Mile from Home
- My African Wedding
- Black Silhouette

=== Best Sound ===
- Make a Move
- Knocking on Heaven's Door (2014 film)
- Iyore
- Accident (2013 film)
- A Mile from Home
- Number One Fan
- Being Mrs Elliot

=== Best Costume ===
- Murder at Prime Suites
- Stripped
- Iyore
- Apaye
- Make a Move
- Destiny Child
- Lagos Cougars

=== Best Makeup ===
- A Mile from Home
- Number One Fan
- Iyore
- Last Three Digits
- Apaye
- Murder at Prime Suites
- One Last Word

=== Special Recognition ===
- Lynn Whitfield – 30 Days in Atlanta

=== Best Film – Diaspora ===
- Fall Guy
- Captive
- Faces of Love
- Ekei
- Brides War

=== Best Film Director – Diaspora ===
- Ekei – Akim Macauley
- Captive – John Uche
- Fall Guy – Obed Joe
- Faces of Love – Robert Peters
- A Message to Brian – A.B Sallu
- Punch Rolla – Matt Lillard

=== Best Actor – Diaspora ===
- Mohammed Bah – Fall Guy
- Eno Williams – A Message to Brian
- Raz Adoti – Faces of Love
- Moses Efret – Brides War
- Kayode Akinbayo – Punch Rolla
- Ken Monnette – The Storm

=== Best Actress – Diaspora ===
- Edith Pikwa Boma – A Message to Brian
- Paula Obaseki – Captive
- Laurene Noire – Captive
- Syr Law – Faces of Love
- Stephanie Maa – Ekei
- Melissa Determined – Brides War
- Bessy Ikem – American Mama

=== Male Viewer's Choice ===
- Uti Nwachukwu
- Majid Michel
- Chris Attoh
- Joseph Benjamin (actor)
- John Dumelo
- Alex Ekubo
- Yemi Blaq
- Eddie Watson

=== Female Viewer’s Choice ===
- Yvonne Nelson
- Ini Edo
- Jackie Appiah
- Mercy Johnson
- Uche Jombo
- Nse Ikpe Etim
- Tonto Dikeh
- Yvonne Okoro

=== Grand Recognition ===
- Captain (Dr.) Hosa Wells Okunbo
