= List of Nigerian films of 2016 =

This is a list of Nigerian films scheduled for theatrical release in 2016.

== 2016 ==
=== January–March ===
Opening		Title	Director	Cast	Genre	Studio	Ref.
J A N U A R Y	8	Elephant in the Room	Asurf Oluseyi	Ramsey Nouah; Zainab Sheriff	Romantic Comedy	Ramsey Films; Zedzee Multimedia	
J A N U A R Y	15	Beyond Blood	Greg Odutayo	Kehinde Bankole; Joseph Benjamin; Bimbo Manuel; Carol King; Shan George	Romantic Drama	Royal Roots; HF Media; The Script Kompany	
J A N U A R Y	15	Love is in the Hair	Ansa Kpokpogri	Uti Nwachukwu; Bishop Ime; Toyin Aimakhu; Okey Bakassi	Romantic Comedy	Royal Arts Academy	
F E B R U A R Y	5	Couple of Days	Lord Tanner	Lilian Esoro; Kiki Omeili; Adesua Etomi; Ademola Adedoyin	Romantic Comedy	FilmOne	
F E B R U A R Y	12	Suru L'ere	Mildred Okwo	Beverly Naya; Seun Akindele; Kemi Lala; Tope Tedela	Comedy Drama	Mord Pictures; The Audrey Silva Company	

=== April–June ===
Opening		Title	Director	Cast	Genre	Notes	Ref.
A P R I L	1	93 Days	Steve Gukas	Bimbo Akintola; Danny Glover; Bimbo Manuel; Tim Reid	Docu-Drama	Native Filmworks	
M A Y	1	The CEO	Kunle Afolayan	Kemi Lala Akindoju; Hilda Dokubo; Jimmy Jean-Louis	Drama		
J U N E	1	Ghana Must Go	Frank Rajah Arase	Yvonne Okoro; Blossom Chukwujekwu; Nkem Owoh; Ik Ogbonna	Drama	Uzomedia Studios; Desamour Company	

== See also ==
- 2016 in Nigeria
- List of Nigerian films
