= 2014 Best of Nollywood Awards =

Awards ceremony

- Date: October 11, 2014
- Location: Port Harcourt
- Country: Nigeria
- Hosted by: Gbemi Olateru-Olagbegi; Fred Amata

Television/radio coverage
- Network: Africa Magic; AIT

The 2014 Best of Nollywood Awards was the 6th edition of the Best of Nollywood Awards ceremony, and took place in Port Harcourt, Nigeria on 16 October 2014. The event was hosted by Gbemi Olateru-Olagbegi and Fred Amata with special performances from Wizkid and Okey Bakassi.

== Awards ==
=== Best Actor in Leading Role (English) ===
- Kanayo O. Kanayo – Apaye
- Joseph Benjamin (actor) - Don’t Cry for me
- Gbenga Akinnagbe - Render to Caesar
- Tope Tedela - A Mile from Home
- Femi Jacobs - The Meeting (film)
- Bob-Manuel Udokwu - Dining with a Long Spoon

=== Best Actor in Leading Role (Yoruba) ===
- Odunade Adekola - Mufu oloosa oko
- Niyi Johnson - Oritoke
- Yinka Quadri - Aremo Ite
- Muyiwa Ademola - Eja Nla
- Femi Adebayo - Fifehanmi

=== Best Actor in Leading Role(Hausa) ===
- Yakubu Mohammed - Duniya Han
- Sani Danja - Byrin Zuciya
- Ibrahim Maishunk - Aduniya
- Adam A Zango - Ruwan Jakara
- Sadik Sani - Hadarin Gabas

=== Best Actor in Leading Role (Igbo) ===
- Okey Bakasi - Onye Ozi

=== Best Actress in Leading Role (English) ===
- Omoni Oboli - Being Mrs Elliot
- Ivie Okujaye - Black Silhouette
- Mary Lazarus - Don’t Cry for Me
- Clarion Chukwura - Apaye
- Fati Zanna – Our Difference
- Ijeoma Grace Agu - Misfit

=== Best Actress in Leading Role (Yoruba) ===
- Bimbo Oshin Ibironke] - Feresisemi
- Yewande Adekoya - Kudi Klepto
- Bidemi Kosoko - Kori Koto
- Sheyi Ashekun - Fifehanmi
- Iyabo Ojo - Silence

=== Best Actress in Leading Role (Igbo) ===
- Ngozi Igwebike - Onye Ozi
- Queen Nwokoye - Adamobi

=== Best Actress in Leading Role (Hausa) ===
- Fati Washa - Bincike
- Fati Ladan- Byrin Zuriya
- Nafisat Abdullahi- Ruwan Jakara
- Asmau Abubakar - Hadarin Gabas

=== Best supporting Actor (English) ===
- Sidney Onoriode Esiri- Last 3 Digits
- Chidozie Nzeribe - A Mile from Home
- Ayo Makun - Being Mrs Elliot
- Kalu Ikeagwu - Blue Flames
- Femi Jacobs - Dream Walker

=== Best supporting Actress (English) ===
- Mercy Johnson - Hustlers
- Uru Eke - Dining with a Long Spoon
- Evelyn Sin - Seven Rivers
- Rita Dominic- The Meeting (film)
- Nse Ikpe Etim - Dream Walker

=== Best supporting Actor (Yoruba) ===
- Razak Olayiwola - Sanbe
- Dele Odule - Kori-koto
- Muyiwa Ademola - Oritoke
- Abdulateef Adedimeji - Kudi Klepto
- Jamiu Azeez - Orofo

=== Best supporting Actress (Yoruba) ===
- Biola Segun-Willams - Silence
- Fathia Balogun - Ina Loju Ekun
- Biodun Okeowo - Orofo
- Ayo Adesanya - Sanbe
- Odunayo Agoro - Osunfunke

=== Most Promising Actor ===
- Jamiu Azeez - Orofo
- Abdulateef Adedimeji - Kudi klepto
- Temisan Etsede
- Sidney Esiri - 3 Digits

=== Most Promising Actress ===
- Ivie Okujaye - Black Silo
- Ijeoma Grace Agu - Misfits
- Jackie Idumogu firs
- Oyinka Elebuibon Sanbe

=== Best Child Actor in Movie ===
- Olamide David - Black Silhouette
- Chisom Okusua - Mama Africa
- Elitim Wari - Apaye
- D’Kachy Emelonye - Onye Ozi

=== Best Child Actress in Movie ===
- Carol Micheal - Apaye
- Toyin Eniola - Oritoke co-winners
- Chinny Okemuo - Onye Ozi
- Pricillia Ojo - Silence co-winners

=== Best Movie of the Year ===
- Apaye
- A Mile from Home
- The Meeting (film)
- First Cause
- Silence

=== Best Comedy of the Year ===
- I Come Lagos
- Onye Ozi
- 30 Days in Atlanta
- Our Lucky Day
- Mimiado

=== Movie with the Best Social Message ===
- Oritoke
- Knocking on Heaven's Door (2014 film)
- Black Silhouette
- Our Difference
- Dream Walker
- First Cause

=== Movie with the Best Special Effect ===
- A Mile from Home
- Aduniya
- Seven Rivers (Onaji Stephen Onche)
- The Origin
- Ina loju Ekun

=== Best Kiss in a Movie ===
- Gabriel Afolayan and Jackie Idumogu - First Cause
- Majid Michel and Beverly Naya - Forgetting June
- Joseph Benjamin (actor) and Ini Edo - Perfect Plan
- Monalisa Chinda and Lugo Tourton - Lagos Cougars
- Blossom Chukwujeku and Ini Edo - Knocking on Heaven's Door (2014 film)

=== Best use of Make up in a Movie ===
- Seven Rivers
- Kudi Klepto
- Cobra
- Mama Africa
- Aremo Ife

=== Best Cinematography ===
- Osunfunke
- Apaye
- Being Mrs Elliot
- The Meeting
- 30 Days in Atlanta

=== Screenplay of the Year ===
- A Mile from Home
- The Meeting (film)
- Secret Room
- Render to Caesar
- Silence

=== Best Short Film ===
- Brave
- Wages
- Not Right
- New Morning
- Living Funeral
- Alpha Mum

=== Best Documentary ===
- Fatai Rolling Dollar
- Bad Budgeting for Development
- Seeds of Growth

=== Best TV Series ===
- Lekki Wives
- The Johnsons
- Dear Mother
- New Horizon
- Happy Family

=== Best Edited Movie ===
- Apaye
- A Mile from Home
- Last 3 digits
- Silence
- 30 days in Atlanta

=== Best Use of Food in a Movie ===
- Being Mrs Elliot
- Apaye
- Seven Rivers

=== Movie with the Best Sound ===
- Osunfunke
- Render to Caesar
- Apaye
- Being Mrs Elliot
- The Meeting (film)

=== Movie with the Best Production Design ===
- Being Mrs Elliot
- Apaye
- Seven Rivers
- Iyawo Osun
- Osunfunke

=== Director of the Year ===
- Eric Aghimien - A Mile from Home
- Desmond Elliot - Apaye
- Mildred Okwo - The Meeting
- Dj Tee- Osunfunke
- Alex Mouth - Silence

=== Revelation of the year (Male) ===
- Tope Tedela
- Adams Kehinde
- Blossom Chukwujekwu
- Daniel Ugorije
- Daniel K Daniel

=== Revelation of the Year (Female) ===
- Seyi Edun
- Biola Olasheni
- Uche Nwayanwu
- Linda Ejiofor
