= List of Nigerian films of 2014 =

This is a list of Nigerian films released in 2014.

== Films ==
Title	Director	Cast	Genre	Notes
Being Mrs Elliot	Omoni Oboli	Majid Michel; Omoni Oboli; Sylvia Oluchy; Ayo Makun	Romantic comedy	It had its world premiere on 30 August 2014 at Silverbird Galleria, Victoria Island, Lagos and was released theatrically across Nigeria on 5 September.
Render to Caesar	Desmond Ovbiagele; Onyekachi Ejim	Gbenga Akinnagbe; Omoni Oboli; Wale Ojo; Bimbo Manuel; Dede Mabiaku; Kalu Ikeagwu	Crime drama	
Tunnel	Stanlee Ohikhuare	Nse Ikpe Etim; Femi Jacobs; Waje	Drama	
Iyore	Frank Rajah Arase	Rita Dominic; Bukky Wright; Joseph Benjamin	Drama	10 nominations at 2014 Golden Icons Academy Movie Awards
Make a Move	Niyi Akinmolayan	Ivie Okujaye; Tina Mba; Beverly Naya; Wale Adebayo	Dance / musical	
Knocking on Heaven's Door	Desmond Elliot	Majid Michel; Adesuwa Etomi; Blossom Chukwujekwu; Ini Edo	Romantic drama / musical	
October 1	Kunle Afolayan	Sadiq Daba; Kehinde Bankole; David Baile; Deola Sagoe	Dark psychological thriller	
Brother's Keeper	Ikechukwu Onyeka	Majid Michel; Omoni Oboli; Beverly Naya; Barbara Soky	Thriller	Nominations at 10th Africa Movie Academy Awards
Dry	Stephanie Okereke	Stephanie Okereke; Liz Benson; William McNamara; Darwin Shaw	Drama	
30 Days in Atlanta	Robert Peters	Ayo Makun; Vivica A. Fox; Lynn Whitfield; Karlie Redd	Comedy	
When Love Happens	Seyi Babatope	Weruche Opia; OC Ukeje; Beverly Naya; Oreka Godis; Gideon Okeke; Bukky Wright; Desmond Elliot; Wale Ojo	Romantic comedy	
A Place in the Stars	Steve Gukas	Gideon Okeke; Segun Arinze; Matilda Obaseki; Yemi Blaq; Femi Branch; Dejumo Lewis	Thriller	
Champagne	Emem Isong	Majid Michel; Alexx Ekubo; Rosemary Zimu; Susan Peters; Tana Adelana	Romantic thriller	

== See also ==
- List of Nigerian films
