= Elephant in the room (disambiguation) =

"Elephant in the room" or "elephant in the living room" is an idiom referring to an obvious truth that is ignored, and may also refer to:

== Film and television ==
- "The Elephant in the Room", a 2006 episode of the American television drama Commander in Chief
- Patrice O'Neal: Elephant in the Room, a 2011 stand-up comedy special by Patrice O'Neal
- The Elephant in the Living Room (film), a 2011 documentary about raising exotic animals in the United States
- Elephant in the Room (2016 film), a Nigerian romantic comedy film

== Music ==
- The Elephant in the Room (album), a 2008 musical album by Fat Joe
- "Elephant in the Room", a song by 6lack from the EP 6pc Hot EP
- "Elephant in the Room", a song by the Thundamentals from the album So We Can Remember

== Other uses ==
- The Elephant in the Room (book), a 2006 book by Ryan Sager
- Elephant in the Room, a play by Dan Fogler
- Elephants in Rooms, the YouTube channel of Ken LaCorte
- The Room in the Elephant, a restaurant in Torquay, Devon, England
