= Okawa Shaznay =

Cameroonian actress

- Born: Bamenda, Northwest Region, Cameroon
- Education: Texas Southern University
- Occupation: Actress
- Years active: 2014 - present
- Awards: Exquisite lady of the year award, 2016

Okawa Shaznay is a Nollywood actress from Cameroon and the first from her country to successfully break into Nollywood with her role in the blockbuster movie Iyore; starring alongside Rita Dominic and Joseph Benjamin. Okawa Shaznay has also gained more prominence with her leading role in the 2016 hit TV series Delilah: The Mysterious Case of Delilah Ambrose. She won the Exquisite Lady of the Year ELOY Awards for TV Actress of the year in 2016 for her role in Delilah. In April 2026, she was honored with a star on the Cameroon Wall of Fame in recognition of her contribution to African cinema.

== Early life and background ==
Okawa Shaznay was born in Cameroon. She began her secondary school education in Presbyterian Secondary School Mankon, Bamenda, Cameroon. Shaznay later moved to the United States, where she graduated with a bachelor's degree in accounting from Texas Southern University.

== Career ==
Some of her notable work includes the 2016 film Refugees, in which she starred alongside Yvonne Nelson and Belinda Effah. In 2019, she starred in In My Country directed by Frank Rajah Arase with Sam Dede and Bimbo Manuel. The film received international distribution on Netflix, and she was nominated for Best Actress in a Leading Role at the 2018 Africa Movie Academy Awards for her performance. She also starred in the 2021 Zuri 24 Media production Movement Japa alongside Gideon Okeke and Sambasa Nzeribe, which aired on Showmax and Africa Magic. In 2025, she starred as the title character in the fantasy film Tarella, directed by Kayode Kasum and Lolo Eremie, alongside Richard Mofe-Damijo, Timini Egbuson, and Elvina Ibru. The film was released in Nigerian cinemas in February 2025. In April 2026, Shaznay was honored with a star on the Cameroon Wall of Fame during the 10th edition of the Cameroon International Film Festival (CAMIFF), recognizing her contribution to African cinema as a Cameroonian actress. The induction took place on 25 April 2026 in Buea, Cameroon

== Filmography (selected) ==
Year	Film	Role	Notes
2013	Cheaters 1& 2	Clara	with Jackie Appiah & Adjetey Anang
2014	Sisters At War 1 & 2	Ayah Ampah	with Jackie Appiah, Yvonne Nelson, & Koffi Ajorlolo.
2014	Cheaters Vacation	Tracy	with Yvonne Nelson, Eddie Watson
2014	The Prince of Barmah	Rita Nash	with Jackie Appiah, Koffi Ajorlolo & Kalsum Sinare.
2015	Scars	Gaya Lawson	with Mike Ezuruonye, Clarion Chukwurah,& Lilian Esoro.
2015	Iyore	Amenze/Onaiwu Esosa/Princess Ajoke/	with Rita Dominic, Joseph Benjamin, Yemi Blaq, Paul Obazele, Bukky Wright. on Netflix.
2016	Refugees	Nahlela	with Belinda Effah, Yvonne Nelson.
2016	Delilah: The Mysterious Case of Delilah Ambrose (TV series)-Season 1 & 2.	Delilah Ambrose	with Clarion Chukwurah, Michael Okon, Paul Obazele on Africa Magic
2017	Crossed Path	Melody	with Ken Erics, Frank Artus & Emem Inwang on Irokotv.
2017	Perfect Strangers	Anastasia Lawson	with Desmond Elliott, Segun Arinze, & Barbara Soky on Irokotv.
2017	Soul Tie	Grace	with Ramsey Nouah on Irokotv.
2017	Wounded	Wendy	with Desmond Elliott, Ini Edo, & Tony Umez, Padita Agu for Africa Magic Productions & on Showmax.
2017	Snatched	Grace	with Michael Godson & Linda Osifo for Africa Magic Productions & on Showmax.
2017	Behind the Face	Amanda	with Tony Umez & Michael Okon.
2017	Delilah: The Mysterious Case of Delilah Ambrose (TV series)-Season 3.	Delilah Ambrose	with Tony Umez, Segun Arinze, Michael Okon.
2018	The Gamble	Vanessa Williams	with Eucharia Anunobi, Tony Umez & Chamberlain Okoro on Irokotv.
2018	Save My Heart	Ivory	with Seun Akindele for Africa Magic Productions.
2019	Unbroken Cord		with Ken Erics.
2019	Love & Lies		with Eddie Watson & Khing Bassey for Africa Magic Productions.
2019	Customer Service	Stacy	with Etinosa & Khing Bassey for Africa Magic Productions.
2019	My Chances	Jemima	with Frederick Leonard & Zack Orji for Africa Magic Productions & on Showmax.
2019	In My Country	Adesua Odihi	with Sam Dede, Bimbo Manuel & Shan George on Netflix.
2020	Lekki On Arrival	Vera	with IK Ogbonna on Ibakatv.
2020	Concession	Sandra	with Uzor Arukwe & Lucy Ameh on Nevada bridge Tv.
2020	Grow Up or Nuts (Web series).	Kiki	with Efe Irele & Sophie Alakija on YouTube.
2021	Almost Had You	Ireti	with Bolanle Ninalowo on Ibakatv
2021	Movement-Japa	Mimi	with Sambassa Nzeribe, Gideon Okeke on Showmax
2022	Engel		with Melvin Oduah, Stephen Damian on Rok Studios
2022	Love Happened		with Ujams Chukwunonso on Ruth Kadiri 247 YouTube
2023	The Secret		with Maurice Sam on YouTube
2023	Another Day to Love		with Bryan Okwara on Uchenna Mbunabo TV YouTube.
2023	Let's Play	Andrea	with Deza The Great on Ruth Kadiri 247 YouTube.
2023	Love To Hate You		with Ben Touitou and Stephania Bassey on YouTube.
2023	Love Boundaries	Alora	with Deza The Great on YouTube.
2024	Activated Passion		with Chike Daniels and Anthony Woode on Uche Nancy TV YouTube
2024	Stubborn Man	Suzy	with Deza The Great on YouTube.
2024	Wife Material		with Deza The Great on Nolly Family TV YouTube.
2024	Breathe on Me	Akum	with Eddie Watson and Genevieve Ukatu on Ruth Kadiri 247 YouTube.
2024	A Special Kind Of Love	Lucy	with Maurice Sam on Maurice Sam TV YouTube.
2024	Fire Hearts	Cyndy	with Maurice Sam on Maurice Sam TV YouTube.
2024	Jackpot	Vicky	with Uzor Arukwe and Sarian Martin on Ruth Kadiri 247 YouTube.
2025	Tarella	Tarella	with Timini Egbuson, Richard Mofe Damijo, Gideon Okeke across Nigerian Cinemas.
2025	Moving On		with Jide Kene on Chinedu Benjamin YouTube
2025	Blood Cry		with Chris Okagbue and Victory Micahel on Awele Hansel TV YouTube.
2025	Loud Silence		with Maurice Sam on Maurice Sam TV YouTube.
2025	Eligible Bachelors	Hawa	with Maurice Sam and Van Vicker on Maurice Sam TV YouTube.
2025	Locked In	Tiaraoluwa	with John Ekanem on Omoni Oboli TV YouTube.
2025	In Every Lifetime	Nailah	with Daniel Etim Effiong and Ego Nwosu on Ego Nwosu TV YouTube.
2026	Half In Half		with Maurice Sam and Michelle Oluwafemi on Maurice Sam TV YouTube.
2026	Split Intentions	Ifeoma	with Daniel Etim Effiong and Stephanie Tum on Stephanie Tum TV YouTube
2026	Greyline		with Teddy A and Micahel Ejoor on Grip TV YouTube.
2026	My Sweet Pain		with Patience Ozokwor and Qwaisi Blay on YouTube.
2026	Behind These Laughs		with Maurice Sam and Real Judy on Maurice Sam TV YouTube.
2026	Mummy G.O	Ndanti	with Stan Nze, Blossom Chukwujekwu, Blessing Obasi Nze on Love Story Media YouTube.

== Awards and nominations ==
Year	Event	Prize	Work	Result
2013	2013 Golden Icons Academy Movie Awards	Most Promising Actress	Cheaters	Nominated
2014	2014 Golden Icons Academy Movie Awards	Best Supporting Actress	Sisters at War	Nominated
2015	2015 Nigeria Entertainment Awards	Actress of the Year (Africa)	Iyore	Nominated
2016	ELOY Awards	TV Actress of the year	Delilah: The Mysterious Case of Delilah Ambrose	Won
2017	Nollywood and African Film Critics Awards	Best Actress in a series	Delilah: The Mysterious Case of Delilah Ambrose	Won
2018	Africa Movie Academy Awards (AMAA)	Best Actress in a Leading Role	In My Country	Nominated
2026	Cameroon International Film Festival (CAMIFF)	Star on the Cameroon Wall of Fame	Acting Career	Honored
