= Princess Inikpi =

Igala princess

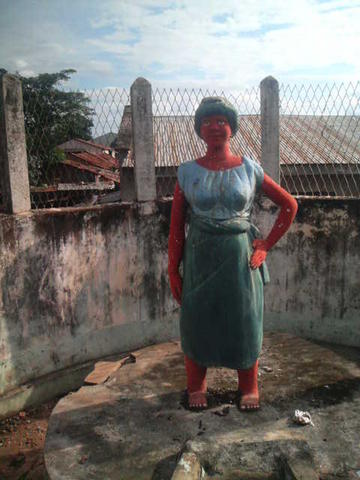
- The statue of Princess Inikpi at Ega Market in Idah

Princess Inikpi was the virgin princess of the Igala Kingdom, buried alive to save the kingdom from the doom of the Igala-Benin war in 1515-1516 during the reign of Ata Ayegba Oma-idoko. Her statue is still standing at her burial spot at Ega market close to river Nigern Idah, Kogi State Nigeria. Many Igala have named their daughters after her.

In the early 16th century, the Igala Kingdom was at war with the Bini Kingdom. The war had devastating effects on the Igala people, with their farmlands seized and streams poisoned by the enemy. The king consulted the oracle, seeking a solution to save his kingdom. The oracle decreed that the only way to defeat the Bini Kingdom was to sacrifice Princess Inikpi by burying her alive.²

The king was heartbroken but couldn't find an alternative solution. Princess Inikpi, noticing her father's sorrow, asked about the reason behind his sadness. When she learned of the oracle's decree, she voluntarily agreed to sacrifice herself for the sake of her people.³

Princess Inikpi was buried alive at the bank of the River Niger, and her sacrifice was believed to have saved the Igala Kingdom from destruction. The Bini warriors, seeing the town in flames (which was actually the result of Princess Inikpi's blood), retreated, thinking the town was already destroyed.⁴

Today, Princess Inikpi is remembered as a heroine who gave her life for her people. A statue of Princess Inikpi stands at her burial site in Idah, Kogi State, and her legacy continues to inspire generations.

Inikpi was the protagonist in the 2020 film The Legend of Inikpi, directed by Frank Rajah Arase.

== Histories ==
The Igala kingdom sovereignty, peace and existence was perpetually threatened by the then Benin kingdom. To avert the impending doom of war and grant the kingdom victory, Princess inikpi the only daughter of the King became the sacrificial lamb requested by the oracle. Princess Inikpi offers herself to be sacrificed despite resistance by the King Ayegba.
