= In My Country =

In My Country may refer to:

- In My Country (2004 film), a South African drama film
- In My Country (2017 film), a Nigerian film
