= The Legend of Inikpi =

2020 Nigerian historical drama film by Frank Rajah Arase

- Directed by: Frank Rajah Arase
- Produced by: Mercy Johnson
- Starring: Nancy Ameh; Mercy Johnson; Paul Obazele
- Production company: Wale Adenuga Productions
- Distributed by: Silverbird Film Distribution
- Release date: 19 January 2020
- Country: Nigeria
- Language: English
- Box office: ₦29.9million

The Legend of Inikpi is a 2020 Nigerian historical epic drama film directed by Frank Rajah Arase. The film stars Nancy Ameh in the title role. The film was the debut as a film producer for actress Mercy Johnson. Set in the ancient kingdoms of Igala and Benin, the plot revolves around the story of two kingdoms on the brink of war. The film was premiered on 19 January 2020 and had its theatrical release on 24 January 2020 in Nigeria and Ghana. It was opened to positive reviews and became a box office success. It became the highest-grossing epic historical film in the Nollywood industry, grossing over 20 million, surpassing the previous record set by the 2016 film Ayamma.

== Cast ==
- Nancy Ameh as Princess Inikpi
- Mercy Johnson as Queen Omelve
- Sam Dede as King Attah Ayegba
- Paul Obazele as Oba Esigie
- Saidi Balogun as Oracle
- Odunlade Adekola as Prince Ayegba
- Ivy Blessing Agbo as Ufedo
- Peace Christopher as Ochonia
- Osagie Elegbe as Oboni
- Ruth Omata Eleojo as Ojone
