= Edith Pikwa =

Cameroonian actress

Edith Pikwa Boma
- Born: Edith Pikwa; 3 January; Cameroon
- Occupation: Actress
- Known for: A Message to Brian (2014)

Edith Pikwa Boma (born January 3) is a Cameroonian actress, resident in Houston, Texas, United States.

== Career ==
She was nominated in the Best Actress /Most Promising Actress – Diaspora award category for the film, A Message to Brian, in which she was starred, in the 2014 Golden Icons Academy Movie Awards (GIAMA) Awards. The film was premiered in Houston, Texas.

She was starred in the film, Ndolor and the Senator, which premiered on January 31, 2016, in Houston, Texas. The film produced by Mbango Adambi and directed by Gordon Che featured both Callywood and Nollywood actors and actresses like Mbango Adambi, Kelechi Eke, Frank Artus, Sunnyfield Okezie, Jasmine Roland, Eko Leonel, Ruth Taku, Bareh Mildred, Samson Tarh and Beatrice Nwana.

Her film, Kiss of Death, was the opening film at the CAMIFF 2017 event on April 24.

She was a lead actress in the Camerwood 2018 film, Tenacity, also featuring Libota McDonald, Mat Atugon, Vugah Samson and Eyo Eyo Michael. The film also won the Best Feature Film award at the 2018 CAMIFF Awards.

== Filmography ==
Year	Film	Role	Genre	Ref.
2018	Tenacity	Lead actress		
2018	Ward Zee	Florence	Drama / Mystery	
2017	Kiss of Death	Actress	Comedy / Drama	
2016	Ndolor and the Senator	Lead actress		
2014	A Message to Brian	Oby	Drama	
