= 2016 in Nigeria =

- Decades: 1990s; 2000s; 2010s; 2020s
- See also: Other events of 2016; Timeline of Nigerian history

The following lists events that happened during 2016 in Nigeria.

== Incumbents ==
=== Federal government ===
- President: Muhammadu Buhari (APC)
- Vice President: Yemi Osinbajo (APC)
- Senate President: Bukola Saraki (APC)
- House Speaker: Yakubu Dogara (APC)
- Chief Justice: Mahmud Mohammed (Until 10 November)

=== Governors ===
- Abia State: Okezie Ikpeazu (PDP)
- Adamawa State: Bindo Jibrilla (APC)
- Akwa Ibom State: Udom Emmanuel (PDP)
- Anambra State: Willie Obiano (APGA)
- Bauchi State: M. A. Abubakar (APC)
- Bayelsa State: Henry Dickson (PDP)
- Benue State: Samuel Ortom (APC)
- Borno State: Kashim Shettima (APC)
- Cross River State: Ben Ayade (PDP)
- Delta State: Ifeanyi Okowa (PDP)
- Ebonyi State: Dave Umahi (PDP)
- Edo State: Adams A. Oshiomhole (APC) (until 12 November); Godwin Obaseki (PDP) (starting 12 November)
- Ekiti State: Ayo Fayose (PDP)
- Enugu State: Ifeanyi Ugwuanyi (PDP)
- Gombe State: Ibrahim Dankwambo (PDP)
- Imo State: Rochas Okorocha (APC)
- Jigawa State: Badaru Abubakar (APC)
- Kaduna State: Nasir el-Rufai (APC)
- Kano State: Umar Ganduje (APC)
- Katsina State: Aminu Masari (APC)
- Kebbi State: Abubakar Atiku Bagudu (APC)
- Kogi State: Idris Wada (PDP) (until 27 January); Yahaya Bello (APC) (starting 27 January)
- Kwara State: Abdulfatah Ahmed (APC)
- Lagos State: Akinwumi Ambode (APC)
- Nasarawa State: Umaru Al-Makura (APC)
- Niger State: Abubakar Sani Bello (APC)
- Ogun State: Ibikunle Amosun (APC)
- Ondo State: Olusegun Mimiko (LP)
- Osun State: Rauf Aregbesola (APC)
- Oyo State: Abiola Ajimobi (APC)
- Plateau State: Simon Lalong (APC)
- Rivers State: Ezenwo Nyesom Wike (PDP)
- Sokoto State: Aminu Tambuwal (APC)
- Taraba State: Darius Ishaku (PDP)
- Yobe State: Ibrahim Geida (APC)
- Zamfara State: Abdul-aziz Yari Abubakar (APC)

== Events ==
- January - Nigeria's economy contracted 1.5%, the first time it had shrunk in 25 years
- 4 January - Haliru Mohammed Bello, the former Defense Minister and campaign manager for former President Goodluck Jonathan, was arrested on suspicion of money laundering.
- 12 January - Boko Haram militants shot and killed 7 people and burned down 10 houses in Madagali, Adamawa
- 11 February - Two individuals identified as female detonated explosive devices in a camp located in Dikwa, Borno. The incident resulted in the loss of approximately 58 lives among internally displaced persons (IDPs). Additionally, another individual, described as a girl, admitted to security authorities that she refrained from carrying out a similar suicide mission after realizing that her relatives were seeking refuge in the camp.
- 11 June - 12th Africa Movie Academy Awards took place in Port Harcourt.
- July - A commission of inquiry established by the state government suggested that soldiers responsible for the deaths of 347 members of the Shiite Islamic Movement of Nigeria in Zaria, Kaduna state, during December 12-14, 2015, should face prosecution.
- 3-7 August - Nigerian Editors conference took place in Port Harcourt.
- October - The Kaduna State government implemented a ban on the Islamic Movement in Nigeria (IMN), prompting similar bans on Shia groups in four northern states. Subsequently, instances of violence involving mobs and law enforcement have occurred during Shia religious activities, resulting in fatalities among IMN members across Kaduna, Kano, Katsina, Plateau, Sokoto, and Yobe States.
- 29 October - Suspected Boko Haram suicide bombers kill at least nine people in Maiduguri.

== See also ==
- List of Nigerian films of 2016
