= Tunnel (2014 film) =

2014 Nigerian drama film directed by Stanlee Ohikhuare

- Directed by: Stanlee Ohikhuare
- Screenplay by: Adejumoke Atunde
- Produced by: Adejumoke Atunde; Grace Edwin-Okon; Morenike Erinle
- Starring: Nse Ikpe Etim; Femi Jacobs; Waje Iruobe; Patrick Doyle; Femi Akeredolu; Lepacious Bose
- Production company: Parables Entertainment
- Release date: 16 March 2014
- Country: Nigeria
- Language: English

Tunnel is a 2014 Nigerian drama film directed by Stanlee Ohikhuare and starring Nse Ikpe Etim, Femi Jacobs, Waje Iruobe and Lepacious Bose. The film tells a story on the life and struggles of a young pastor and his journey to ultimate fulfillment.

== Cast ==
- Nse Ikpe Etim
- Femi Jacobs as Pastor Lade Olagbesan
- Waje Iruobe as Sade
- Patrick Doyle
- Femi Akeredolu
- Lepacious Bose
- Jumoke Olatunde

== Release ==
The film premiered on 16 March 2014. It was released on IROKOtv on 4 September 2014.

== Reception ==
Nollywood Reinvented gave it a 35% rating and praised the storyline and acting but felt it was not engaging enough.

== See also ==
- List of Nigerian films of 2014
