= Delilah: The Mysterious Case of Delilah Ambrose =

2016 Nigerian TV series

- Official TV Series poster
- Directed by: Frank Rajah Arase
- Starring: Okawa Shaznay; Clarion Chukkwurah; Michael Okon; Paul Obazele; Tony Umez; Chamberlyne Okoro; Emem Iniobong
- Theme music composer: Bernie Anti
- Country of origin: Nigeria
- No. of seasons: 3
- No. of episodes: 32

Production
- Producer: Frank Rajah Arase
- Production companies: Raj and Heroes Films

Delilah: The Mysterious Case of Delilah Ambrose is a 2016 Nigerian TV drama series set in Nigeria, directed by Frank Rajah Arase. It stars Okawa Shaznay, Clarion Chukwurah, Michael Okon, Paul Obazele, and Tony Umez. Delilah premiered on Africa Magic on June 2, 2016 airing season one and two combined; it was also broadcast online via irokotv. Season three has been filmed and is set for airing in 2017.

== Cast ==
- Okawa Shaznay as Delilah Ambrose
- Clarion Chukwurah as Sylvia Ambrose
- Michael Okon as Jason Attah
- Paul Obazele as Barrister William
- Tony Umez as Julius
- Chamberlyne Okoro as Benjamin Ambrose
- Emem Iniobong as Caroline Ambrose
- Rich Tanksley as the American Ambassador

== Plot ==
=== Season 1 ===
After the death of Charles Ambrose, his family is summoned to court over his second marriage to Delilah Ambrose. Chief Ambrose's first wife, Sylvia connives with men of the underworld to eliminate Delilah. During the court case, a surprising witness is brought in to court to testify against Delilah Ambrose. Delilah threatens Barrister William with his secret. Jason urges Delilah to open up to him in order for him to help with her court case. On the other hand, Jason's wife, Eva, is not particularly happy about her husband's lack of attention as he becomes obsessed with representing Delilah. Benjamin warns Razor to lie low for the time being. Delilah still insists on defending herself in court while Sylvia is bent on eliminating Delilah. Jason, is not pleased to hear that Eva is pregnant as tension builds between Jason and Delilah. Delilah finds out she is pregnant as Jason's marriage is on the verge of crashing. Benjamin threatens Barrister Williams in a bid to take over his father's company. Eva receives a disturbing call from a mystery man. Barrister Jason allows his emotions get in the way of his duty as a lawyer. Investigations continue as detectives find out more information on Chief Ambrose's death. Eva's past comes back to haunt her. The detectives are curious as they soon discover that the gun used to murder John belongs to the late Mr. Charles Ambrose. Benjamin still insists he has every right to inherit his father's company. Jason wants to know who the real father of Delilah's baby is. Benjamin escapes untimely death. Delilah will do anything to fight for justice at all cost.

=== Season 2 ===
Delilah’s court case is finally over and the verdict has left people asking questions. Jason on the other hand is still lustfully thinking of Delilah. The detectives are still trying to solve the puzzle of Delilah’s ex-husbands' deaths. Sylvia Ambrose is on edge, as the detective’s investigations are now pointing in her direction and Liam discovers his picture on Delilah’s wall with her late husbands. Louisa has been arrested after the poison she hid was found. One of Delilah’s ex-husband’s daughter Alicia appears at the office to threaten Delilah. Delilah reveals Alicia’s secret to Jason, after the threat she made to her; meanwhile Benjamin hooks up with Alicia to hatch a plan to take Delilah down. Sylvia Ambrose gets exposed. Delilah fleas to an un known location to stay until her baby is born. On her arrival she meets her ex to discuss the secrets behind their scandal. Sylvia Ambrose is still in police custody, whilst Benjamin rushes to see his sister Caroline in hospital. Delilah gives the doctor in charge harsh orders to manipulate Caroline’s test results. Delilah visits Caroline and tells her of her activities with the doctor and she goes on to reveal things to her. Delilah wins Caroline over and makes her the managing director of the company. This infuriates Benjamin causing him to ask the barrister questions about his father. Alicia pays Caroline a visit in her new office to strike a deal. Jodie sees the tattoo on Jason’s back of Delilah’s name, Benjamin threatens Alicia as she leaves the country and the detective is experiencing great pressure after his decision, in regards to Sylvia Ambrose’s case. Jason is kidnapped to give answers on Delilah's whereabouts.
