= The Legend of Ngong Hills =

- Directed by: Kwame Nyong'o
- Screenplay by: Alan Barillaro
- Produced by: Kwame Nyong'o; Wallace Murungi; Alnavaz Amlani
- Starring: Derek Assetto; Doreen Kemunto; Steve Muturi; Joseph Waruinge
- Music by: Jim Pywell
- Production company: Apes in Space
- Release date: October 1, 2011 (TTFF)
- Running time: 10 minutes
- Country: Kenya
- Language: English

The Legend of Ngong Hills is a 2011 Kenyan animated short film directed by Kwame Nyong'o, based on a Maasai folktale. The film showed at the 2011 Trinidad and Tobago Film Festival, and it won the Best Animation award at the 8th Africa Movie Academy Awards.

== Plot ==
The story is about Ogre, who has a habit of attacking the Maasai Village, but then falls in love with the beautiful young maiden Sanayian.

== Cast ==
- Derek Assetto as Ogre
- Doreen Kemunto as Sanaiyan
- Steve Muturi as Mzee
- Joseph Waruinge as Maasai Warrior
