= Lepacious Bose =

Nigerian actress and comedianne

- Born: Bose Ogunboye; 17 April 1973 (age 53); Ibadan, Oyo State, Nigeria
- Education: University of Ibadan
- Occupations: Actress; Comedianne; Lawyer
- Known for: Being Mrs Elliot
- Awards: 2014 Golden Icons Academy Movie Awards

Bose Ogunboye (born 17 April 1976) known professionally as Lepacious Bose is a Nigerian comedienne and Nollywood actress. In 2014, she won the 2014 Golden Icons Academy Movie Awards for Best Comedic Act category award in the movie “Being Mrs Elliot” beating other 6 contestants.

== Filmography ==
- The Ever After (TEA) (2023) as Rose
- Makate Must Sell (2019) as Aunty Ada
- 5th Anniversary (2019) as Ronke
- 200 Million (2018)
- Chief Daddy (2018) as Madam Tasty
- Gidi Blues (2016) as Simbi
- First Class (2016) as Principal
- Being Mrs Elliot as Bimpe
- A Long Night (2014) as Aunty Bunmi
- Tunnel (2014)

== Awards and nominations ==
Year	Award	Category	Work	Result	Ref
2014	2014 Golden Icons Academy Movie Awards	Best Comedic Act	Being Mrs Elliot	Won	
2016	Africa Magic Viewers' Choice Awards	Best Actress in a Comedy	Being Mrs Elliot	NOM	
