= Alero's Symphony =

- Film poster
- Directed by: Izu Ojukwu
- Screenplay by: Tunde Babalola
- Produced by: Adedoyin Owotomo; Ifeoma Dozie; Ngozi Nkwoji; Tokunbo Adodo
- Starring: Bimbo Manuel; Ivie Okujaye; Chibuzor 'Faze' Oji; Carol King; Frederick Leonard; Victor Olaitan; Jibola Dabo
- Production company: Amstel Malta Box Office
- Release date: April 21, 2011 (Lagos premiere)
- Country: Nigeria
- Language: English

Alero's Symphony is a 2011 Nigerian musical drama film directed by Izu Ojukwu and starring Bimbo Manuel, Ivie Okujaye and Chibuzor 'Faze' Oji. It premiered at The Palms, Genesis Cinemas, Lagos. The film is an upshot of the Amstel Malta Box Office 5 (AMBO 5) reality show. It received 4 nominations at the 8th Africa Movie Academy Awards and was screened across major Nigerian cities by the Africa Film Academy.

== Plot ==
The film tells the story of Alero (Okujaye), a twin born into a reputable high-class family. After graduating from university with honors, she is due to attend law school. Unbeknownst to her parents, her real desire is to be a singer. The family decides to go on an island vacation to re-ignite their familial bond. While there, Alero meets Lovechild (Faze), a talented but poor waiter. Lovechild helps Alero pursue what she loves as a career. They then fall in love.

== Cast ==
- Ivie Okujaye as Alero
- Chibuzor Oji as Lovechild
- Jibola Dabo
- Bimbo Manuel as Dr. Coker
- Victor Olaitan
- Carol King
- Frederick Leonard
- Timi Richards

== Reception ==
Nollywood Reinvented gave the film a 43% rating and praised the originality and story, however it criticized Faze's acting and concluded saying "It’s the first Izu Ojukwu movie that I do not absolutely adore. I was made to wait a really long time to finally see it but in retrospect I wish I used that time for more fruitful endeavours. It’s not absolutely terrible a movie, but it doesn’t live up to the standard of the filmmaker."

== Accolades ==
List of Awards
Award	Category	Recipients and nominees	Result
Africa Film Academy (8th Africa Movie Academy Awards)	Best Nigerian Film	Izu Chukwu	Nominated
Africa Film Academy (8th Africa Movie Academy Awards)	Best Soundtrack	Faze	Won
Africa Film Academy (8th Africa Movie Academy Awards)	Most Promising Actor	Ivie Okujaye	Won
Africa Film Academy (8th Africa Movie Academy Awards)	Best Editing		Nominated
