= Sonia Ibrahim =

Ghanaian actress and model

- Born: January 9, 1989 (age 37)
- Occupations: Television presenter Actress; Model
- Years active: 2005–Present
- Children: 2
- Relatives: Juliet Ibrahim
- Family: Juliet Ibrahim (sister)

Sonia Ibrahim (born January 9, 1989) is a Ghanaian actress, television presenter and model of Lebanese, Liberian and Ghanaian descent. She is the younger sister of actress Juliet Ibrahim.

== Career ==
In December 2013, Ibrahim was selected as the host of Phamous TV program, broadcast on the Viasat 1 television network. She has modeled for several fashion brands. At the 2013 Ghana Movie Awards, Ibrahim was nominated for her performance in a leading role in the film Number One Fan, which starred her sister Juliet Ibrahim.

== Awards ==
- Best Supporting Actress – NAFCA
- Best Supporting Actress – City People Entertainment Awards
- Actress Of The Year (Africa) – NEA
- Actress of the Year – Zenith University
