= Onye Ozi =

- Theatrical poster
- Onye Ozi
- Directed by: Obi Emelonye
- Written by: Obi Emelonye
- Screenplay by: Obi Emelonye
- Story by: Amaka Obi-Emelonye; Fatima Irole
- Produced by: Obi Emelonye; Emmanuella Ngozi Ideh
- Starring: Okey Bakassi; Anthony Aclet; Stephen Moriaty; Ngozi Igwebike
- Edited by: Ben Nugent
- Music by: Luke Corradine
- Distributed by: M-Net
- Release date: 18 October 2013 (London)
- Running time: 89 mins
- Countries: United Kingdom; Nigeria
- Language: Igbo

Onye Ozi is a 2013 Nigerian comedy film directed by Obi Emelonye. The film won two category awards at the 2014 Nollywood Movies Awards.

== Background and production ==
Onye Ozi was shot in London and was premiered on 18 October 2013 at The Lighthouse Hall, Camberwell, London. It was produced by Obi Emelonye and Emmanuella Ngozi Ideh with support from Nollywood Movies, London, Screen Nation Pictures and M-Net.

== Critical reception ==
Since it debuted in 2013, Onye Ozi has won multiple awards locally and internationally. Upon its release, Onye Ozi was met with mixed reviews. Sodas & Popcorn, a Nigerian movie blog through BellaNaija cited flaws in the film and further criticized Obi Emelonye's film writing technique stating that, "My issue with his movies have always been the writing. The stories never seem to add up and take he most awkward turns and twists." YNaija's Wilfred Okichie also gave the film a low rating describing it as an "ultra-low budget independent film".

== Cast ==
- Okey Bakassi as Metumaribe Onuigbo
- Anthony Aclet as Chike
- Stephen Moriaty as TJ
- Ngozi Igwebike as Mkpurunma
- Adesua Atuanya as Adaaugo
- D'Kachy Obi-Emelonye as Ossy
- Chinemerem Okemuo as Ogbenyealu
- Frank Ani as Ofoegbu
- Nkiruka Emelonye as Uju
- King Onuigbo as Father

== Awards and nominations ==
Year	Award ceremony	Prize	Result
2014	2014 Nollywood Movies Awards	Best Diaspora Movie	Won
2014	2014 Nollywood Movies Awards	Best Indigenous Film	Won
2014	10th Africa Movie Academy Awards	Achievement in Soundtrack	Won
2014	10th Africa Movie Academy Awards	Ousmane Sembene Award for Best Film in An African Language	Nominated
2014	2014 Best of Nollywood Awards	Best Comedy of The Year	Nominated
2015	2015 Africa Magic Viewers Choice Awards	Best Indigenous Language (Igbo)	Won
2015	2015 Nigeria Entertainment Awards	Film of The Year (Indigenous Films)	Nominated
