= Journey to Jamaa =

Journey to Jamaa (also released as Jamaa) is a 2011 Ugandan short film and family drama (about 42 minutes long) based on the true story of two Ugandan AIDS orphans who go on an extraordinary journey and take with them a mysterious box on wheels. Sometimes called (Road to) Jamaa, it was directed by Michael Landon, Jr. and screenplay written by Brian Bird. It received 3 nominations at the 8th Africa Movie Academy Awards.

== Plot ==
After their HIV positive mother's death, Derick and Margaret collect wood and construct a human-length box with wheels. Then, they journey with it from Kampala to Kasangombe in a heartbreaking bid to overcome poverty and experience hope. The journey throws them dangerous experiences on unpredictable Ugandan roads. Their mother's dying wish had set them off on a seemingly impossible journey to find a relative they do not even know.

Before her death, she leaves them an envelope addressed to her sister (their auntie) who is married to a hard-working man living in a distant village called Kasangombe with their kids. Ingeniously, Derick creates a coffin using wood he collected from a rubbish dump and adds luggage bag rollers brought by Margaret. On their journey from Kampala City to their aunt's place, they are offered a lift by a seemingly kind man (played by Joel Okuyo Atiku) in a truck who is amazed by their "box". He introduces them to a kid he had taken under his wings relaxing at the back and shows them a photo of a house they can possess if they work for him. At night though, Margaret sees a scary dream where their helper is not exactly as kind as he seemed so she runs out of the truck. Derick follows and the boy throws out their coffin before waving. They walk the rest of the distance.

Initially, their uncle (played by Isaac Muwawu) did not want them in his house because he thought they were HIV-infected. Derick overheard him quarrel with his aunt at night and shook Margaret in the morning from another dream (this time beautiful, where both siblings were smiling and enjoying a picnic in a glorious garden with their aunt, uncle, cousins, dead parents and some whites). Derick convinced her to walk away from the home with him but without a reason.

On the way, Margaret stops and taunts her brother to reveal why they were leaving or else she wouldn't continue. When he said that he was going to the man who had given them a lift in his truck and work to get a big house like the one in the photo that flew out when they ran, Margaret revealed to him that she had seen a dream the previous night. Derick replied bluntly that her dreams never come true. So when she U-turned in defiance and saw her gleeful aunt coming, she happily ran towards her oblivious of the fact that there was danger lurking. At the T-junction near a bridge, a white Nissan Datsun pick up sped without warning and knocked her into a river, fulfilling the nightmare she had seen a couple of times from the start of the movie. Her uncle helped to pull her out.

== Cast ==
- Benjamin Abemigisha as Derick
- Rachel Nduhukire as Margaret
- Joel Okuyo Atiku Prynce as Lucky
- Joanitta Bewulira-Wandera as Headmistress
- Ben Greathead as Ben Thomas
- Emily Greathead as Emily Thomas
- Hugh Greathead as Mr. Thomas
- Lillian Greathead as Lillian Thomas
- Stefanie Greathead as Mrs. Thomas
- Samual Ibanda as Mosquito net salesman
- Isaac Muwawu as Uncle
- Kaya Kagimu as Auntie Christine
- Abu Kawenja as Rebel leader
- Isaac Kuddzu as Man in taxi
- Maureen Kulany as Rural school teacher
- Miecke Lawino as Brenda
- Edwin Mukalazi as Drunk man No. 2.

== Production and release ==
The underwater scene alone was shot for 8 hours at the swimming pool of a hotel in Entebbe. Scuba divers were used and a sister to the girl playing Margaret's role was the stuntman in the pool. Oxygen was always ready in case she drowned. The movie was released on 16 October 2011. It's a World Vision Experience, building a better world for children. The two siblings who inspired this movie are HIV free and going on well with their lives today supported by World Vision.

A year before the film release during Maisha Filmlab 2010, Benjamin Abemigisha also featured as the main kid in Zebu and the Photo Fish, a short film directed by Zipporah Nyaruri.
