= Iyore =

2014 Nigerian drama film directed by Frank Rajah Arase

- Theatrical release poster
- Directed by: Frank Rajah Arase
- Produced by: Kwame Boadu
- Starring: Rita Dominic; Joseph Benjamin; Okawa Shaznay; Paul Obazele; Yemi Blaq; Bukky Wright
- Production companies: Raj and Heroes Films
- Release date: 2014
- Country: Nigeria
- Languages: English; Edo
- Box office: ₦9,500,000

Iyore (English: The Return: A Life after Life) is a 2014 Nigerian drama film set in the Benin Kingdom, directed by Frank Rajah Arase. It stars Rita Dominic, Joseph Benjamin, Okawa Shaznay, Paul Obazele, Bukky Wright and Yemi Blaq. Before its release, it was nominated in ten categories at the 2014 Golden Icons Academy Movie Awards, slated to be held on the 25th of October 2014.

== Cast ==
- Rita Dominic as Osarugwe
- Joseph Benjamin as Prince Azuwa
- Okawa Shaznay as Princess Ajoke/Amenze/Onaiwu
- Yemi Blaq as Ovie
- Paul Obazele as Oba Izuwe
- Bukky Wright as Queen Tonyin Adekoya
- Okpoya Bisping as Prince Uyi
- Tina Chelsea as Itohan
- Calista Nwajide as Priestess
- Paul Stevens Enofe as Iyobo
- Desmond Walter-Oriakhi as Edosa
- Ikuvbogie God's Power as Izuwa Jr
- Sandra Airhuoyuwa as Osagwe Jr.
- James Coke as Oden
- Andrew Otamere as Chief
- Stella Idika as Edugie

== See also ==
- List of Nigerian films of 2014
