= Heroes and Villains (film) =

2015 Nigerian romantic comedy film

Heroes and Villain
- Heroes and Villains (Comedy, romance)
- Directed by: Shittu Taiwo
- Written by: Daniella Euse Ame
- Produced by: Happy Julien-Uchendu
- Starring: Seun Akindele, Ivie Okujaye and Belinda Effah
- Release date: August 2015
- Country: Nigeria

Heroes and Villains is a 2015 Nigerian romantic comedy film about two couples who almost divorce.

== Plot ==
A couple on a vacation aiming to rekindle the lost spark in their marriage, seek help/counselling from someone else who they believe knows better. Both approach the same person without knowing it. The Counselor doesn't like it when she realizes that they are both not following her instructions.

== Cast ==
- Seun Akindele
- Ivie Okujaye
- Belinda Effah
- Sylvia Oluchy
- Chucks Chyke
- Titi Joseph
- Maksat Ampe

== Production ==
The film was produced in 2015 by Happy Julien-Uchendu, directed by Shittu Taiwo.
