= Being Mrs Elliot =

2014 film by Omoni Oboli

Being Mrs. Elliot
- Theatrical release Poster
- Directed by: Omoni Oboli
- Screenplay by: Omoni Oboli
- Produced by: Nnamdi Oboli; Omoni Oboli
- Starring: Majid Michel; Omoni Oboli; Ayo Makun; Sylvia Oluchy; Seun Akindele; Uru Eke; Lepacious Bose
- Cinematography: John Demps
- Edited by: Steve Sodiya
- Music by: Michael Ogunlade
- Production company: Dioni Visions
- Release dates: 5 June 2014 (Festival); 30 August 2014 (premiere); 5 September 2014 (Nigeria)
- Country: Nigeria
- Language: English

Being Mrs Elliot is a 2014 Nigerian romantic comedy film, co-produced and directed by Omoni Oboli. It stars Majid Michel, Omoni Oboli, Ayo Makun, Sylvia Oluchy and Seun Akindele. It premiered at Nollywood Film Festival in Paris on 5 June 2014. It received 6 nominations at the 2014 Best of Nollywood Awards and was also nominated in 9 categories at the 2014 Golden Icons Academy Movie Awards taking place in October.

== Cast ==
- Omoni Oboli - as Lara
- Majid Michel - as Bill
- Sylvia Oluchy - as Nonye
- Ayo Makun - as Ishawuru
- Seun Akindele - as Fisayo
- Adesola Mako - as Maria
- Ada Lewis-Egbosi as Wendy
- Uru Eke - as Fisayo
- Taiwo Familon - as Boss
- Ejike Daaniel - as Staff
- Stanley Ebi - as Ticket Desk Officer
- Lepacious Bose - as Bimpe
- Chika Chukwu - as Adaeze
- Perpetual Adefemi - as Iya Jumoke
- Jumoke Ayadi as - Iya Raymond
- Lawal Adekunle - as Driver

== Production ==
The film was shot in Lagos, Ekiti and Asaba. In an interview with Encomium Magazine, Oboli stated that she expects to make 200 million Naira from the film.

== Reception ==
The movie is seen as a repeat of another of the producer's movies, with the same male lead role in fact. It is Opined by Pulse movie Review that Brother's keeper and Being Mrs. Elliot have too much in common and is regarded as a counterproductive move.

== Release ==
The film was screened at the Nigerian Presidential Complex with many dignitaries in attendance including president Goodluck Jonathan and vice-president Namadi Sambo. It had its world premiere on 30 August 2014 at Silverbird Galleria, Victoria Island, Lagos and was released theatrically across Nigeria on 5 September.

== See also ==
- List of Nigerian films of 2014
