= 2014 Nollywood Movies Awards =

Award event

3rd Nollywood Movies Awards
- Date: 18 October 2014
- Site: Intercontinental Hotel, Victoria Island, Lagos, Nigeria
- Organized by: Nollywood Movies Network

The 2014 Nollywood Movies Awards was held on October 18, 2014 at Intercontinental Hotel, Lagos.

== Awards ==
Winners are in bold.

Best Movie

- **A Mile From Home**
- Confusion Na Wa
- Itoro
- Make a Move
- Unforgivable
- False
- Flower Girl
- Brother’s Keeper

Best Lead Male

- **Mike Ezuruonye (Unforgivable)**
- OC Ukeje (Confusion Na Wa)
- Tope Tedela (A Mile From Home)
- Kalu Ikeagwu (False)
- Blossom Chukwujekwu (Finding Mercy)
- Frederick Leonard (The Accident)
- Gbenga Akinnagbe (Render to Caesar)
- Yul Edochie (Chioma The Weeping Queen)

Best Lead Female

- **Ireti Doyle (Torn)**
- Nse Ikpe-Etim Sule (I Come Lagos)
- Chioma Akpotha (The Accident)
- Mercy Johnson (Hustlers)
- Dayo Amusa (Unforgivable)
- Joke Silva (The Visitor)
- Uche Jombo-Rodriguez (False)
- Damilola Adegbite (Flower Girl)

Best Actor (Supporting Role)

- **Lucky Ejim (Render To Caesar)**
- Ikponmwosa Gold (Confusion Na Wa)
- Keppy Ekpeyong-Bassey (Itoro)
- Wale Adebayo (Make A Move)
- Okey Uzoeshi (Lonely Heart)
- Wale Macaulay (The Accident)

Best Actress (Supporting Role)

- **Emem Udonquak (Itoro)**
- Abiola Segun-Williams (Finding Mercy)
- Clarion Chukwura Abiola (Hustlers)
- Ebele Okaro Onyiuke (Leave My Tears)
- Bikiya Graham-Douglas (Flower Girl)
- Daniella Okeke (Lagos Cougars)

Best Actor Indigenous

- **Afeez Eniola (Alakada)**
- Okey Bakassi (Onye Ozi)
- Bayo Alawiye (Atanda)
- Odunlade Adekola (Mufu Olosha)

Best Actress Indigenous

- **Dayo Amusa (Unforgivable)**
- Queen Nwokoye (Ada Mbano)
- Ngozi Igwebike (Onye Ozi)
- Toyin Aimakhu Johnson (Alakada)
- Rita Edward (Misfit)

Best Indigenous Movie

- **Onye Ozi**
- Alakada 2
- Misfit
- Ada Mbano
- Unforgivable
- Atanda

Best Director

- **Confusion Na Wa (Kenneth Gyang)**
- A Mile From Home (Eric Aghimien)
- Itoro (Moses Inwang)
- False (Ike Nnaebue)
- Flower Girl (Michelle Bello)
- Torn (Moses Inwang)
- Render To Caesar (Desmond Ovbiagele)
- Unforgivable (Desmond Elliot)

Best Editing

- **Flower Girl (Kunle Laguda)**
- Render To Caesar (Steve Sodiya)
- False (Ike Nnaebue)
- Itoro (Moses Inwang)
- Brother’s Keeper (Okey Benson And Okey Oku)
- The Accident (Not Specified)

Best Sound Design

- **Flower Girl (Kunle Laguda)**
- Secret Room (Maurice Kings)
- Kidnap (Not Specified)
- Render To Caesar (Michael Ogunlade)
- Lagos Cougars (Owolabi Gbade)

Best Cinematography

- **Confusion Na Wa (Yinka Edward)**
- Render To Caesar (Johnny Askwith)
- A Mile From Home (Eric Aghimien)
- False (Joseph Oladunjoye)
- Misplaced (Tom Robson/ Dickson Godwin)
- Flower Girl (James Costello)

Best Original Screenplay

- **Render To Caesar (Desmond Ovbiagele)**
- A Mile From Home (Not Specified)
- False (Ike Nnaebue / Foluke Amanfo)
- Finding Mercy (Kehinde Olorunyomi-Odukoya)
- Accident (Not Specified)
- Unforgivable (Jovi Babs & Olamilekan Daniels)

Best Costume Design

- **The Village Boy I Love (Ogoo Okechi And Doris Kalu)**
- False (Ngozi Jombo – Divas And Divos)
- After The Proposal (Ngozi Jombo)
- A Mile From Home (Godwin Aghimien)
- Lagos Cougars (Angel Nwakibie)

Best Makeup

- **Honeymoon Hotel (Madeline Viijeon / Geordi Binstend / Kirsty Williams / Israel Moses)**
- A Mile From Home (Not Specified)
- Brother’s Keeper (Mathew Alechenu)
- False (Chichi Okafor – Faceville)
- Unforgivable (Abiolah Makeup World)

Best Set Design

- **Flower Girl (Derick Nwa-Jesus)**
- A Mile From Home (Eric Aghimien And Biodun Olagbaju)
- Lonely Heart (Not Specified)
- Dream Walker (Not Specified)
- False (Ujay Studio)
- Itoro (Not Specified)

Best Soundtrack

- **Flower Girl (Efya – Best In Me)**
- A Mile From Home (Vincent Umukoro)
- False (Don L37)
- Render To Caesar (Michael Ogunlade and Seun Owoaje)
- Atanda (Pius Fatoke)
- Unforgivable – Izuchukwu Anozie Vincent

Best Diaspora Movie

- **Onye Ozi**
- Labo
- Shameful Deceit

Best Short Movie

- **Brave**
- Date Gone Bad
- Desolation
- Not Right
- New Horizon
- Kabu Kabu

Best Rising Star Male

- **Tope Tedela (A Mile From Home)**
- Blossom Chuks Chukwujekwu (Finding Mercy)
- Okey Uzoeshi (Lonely Hearts)
- Alexx Ekubo (Lagos Cougars)
- Lucky Ejim (Render To Caesar)
- Shawn Faqua (Lagos Cougars)

Best Rising Star Female

- **Ivie Okujaye (Make A Move)**
- Lilian Esoro (Secret Room)
- Lala Akindoju (Alan Poza)
- Daniella Okeke (Lagos Cougars)
- Tamara Eteimo (Finding Mercy)
- Dabota Lawson (Finding Mercy)
- Emem Udonquak (Itoro)

Best Child Actor

- **Oyindamola Lapejo – Finding Mercy**
- Helger Sosthenes – Make A Move
- Tobe Oboli – Brother’s Keeper
- Titilayo Shobo – Unforgivable

NMA Lifetime Achievement Award 2014

- **Tunde Kelani**

Best TV/Web series

- **Tinsel**

Humanity Award

Stella Ameyo Adadevo

=== Popular Choice Awards ===
- Popular Choice Female- Mercy Johnson
- Popular Choice Male- Odulade Adekola
- Top Box Office movie- Weekend Getaway
