= Kamara's Tree =

2013 film by Desmond Elliot

- Film poster
- Directed by: Desmond Elliot
- Written by: Ivie Okujaye
- Produced by: Morris K. Sesay
- Starring: Desmond Elliot; Lydia Forson; Ivie Okujaye; Tessy Abubakar; Bobby Obodo; Ginnefine Kanu; Morris K Sesay
- Cinematography: Austin Nwaolie
- Production company: Denziot Productions
- Release date: 19 April 2013
- Countries: Nigeria; Sierra Leone
- Language: English

Kamara's Tree is a 2013 Nigerian comedy drama film, directed by Desmond Elliot, starring Desmond Elliot, Lydia Forson, Ivie Okujaye, Tessy Abubakar, Bobby Obodo, Ginnefine Kanu, Morris K Sesay and Dabota Lawson. Set and filmed in Freetown, Sierra Leone, the movie tells the story of a family gathering for the wedding of one of their members, whom the rest of the family has not seen for many years; each of the members must navigate the diverse behaviours of the others as a result.

== Cast ==
- Desmond Elliot as Tejan Kamara
- Tessy Abubakar Eradiri as Tenneth Kamara
- Bobby Obodo as Nouhou Kamara
- Ginnefine Kanu as Selina Kamara
- Morris K Sesay as Abdul Kamara
- Lydia Forson as Lucy
- Ivie Okujaye as Vero Kamara
- Aisha Kamara as Claudette
- Joyce Mhango Chavula
- Dabota Lawson
- Julius Spencer

== Release ==
A trailer for Kamara's Tree was released on December 17, 2012. The film premiered on VOD and television in February 2014, through IROKOtv and Africa Magic respectively.

== See also ==
- List of Nigerian films of 2013
