= 8th Africa Movie Academy Awards =

2012 film awards ceremony

- Date: 22 April 2012
- Hosted by: Jimmy Jean-Louis, OC Ukeje
- Organized by: Africa Film Academy

Highlights
- Best Film: How to Steal 2 Million
- Most awards: How to Steal 2 Million(4)
- Most nominations: Otelo Burning (14)

The 8th Africa Movie Academy Awards ceremony was held on 22 April 2012 at the Expo Centre, Eko Hotel & Suites in Lagos, Nigeria to honour the best African films of 2011. The nominees were announced on 17 March 2012 at the Kairaba Beach Hotel in Banjul, Gambia at an event that was attended by celebrities and top government officials from Gambia and other African countries.

== Awards ==
Best Film	Best Short Film
How to Steal 2 Million - South Africa; State of Violence - South Africa; Adesuwa - Nigeria; Otelo Burning – South Africa; Rugged Priest - Kenya; Ties That Bind - Ghana; Man on Ground - South Africa/Nigeria	Braids on a Bald Head – Nigeria; Jamaa – Uganda; Look Again – Kenya; Maffe Tiga – Guinea; Hidden Life – South Africa; Mwansa The Great - Zimbabwe; Chumo – Tanzania; The Young Smoker - Nigeria
Best Documentary	Best Diaspora Feature
An African Election – Nigeria/Germany; Beyond The Deadly Pit – Rwanda; Awa Ogbe: An African Adventure – Algeria; Dear Mandela – South Africa; White & Black; Crime And Colour – Tanzania; The Niger Delta Struggle – Ghana; There Is Nothing Wrong With My Uncle –Nigeria; How Much Is Too Much – Kenya	Toussaint Louverture – Senegal/France; Ghett'a Life - Jamaica; High Chicago - Canada; Elza - Guadalupe; Better Mus' Come - Jamaica; Kinyanrwanda - USA
Best Diaspora Documentary	Best Diaspora (Short film)
The Education Of Auma Obama - Germany; White Wash - USA; Almendron Mi Corazon - Guadalupe; All Me: The Life And Times Of Winfred Hubert - USA	White Sugar In A Black Pot - USA; John Doe - USA; The Lost One - USA
Best Animation	Best film by an African Living Abroad
The Legend on Ngong Hills – Kenya; Oba - Nigeria; Climate Change is Real – Kenya; Egu – South Africa; Nauliza - Kenya	Housemates – UK/Nigeria; Mystery Of Birds – USA/Nigeria; Ben Kross – Italy/Nigeria; Paparazzi Eye In The Dark – USA/Nigeria/Ghana
Achievement in Production Design	Achievement in Costume Design
Phone Swap – Nigeria; Somewhere in Africa - Ghana; Otelo Burning – South Africa; Adesuwa - Nigeria; How 2 Steal 2 Million - South Africa	Adesuwa – Nigeria; The Captain Of Nakara - Kenya; Rugged Priest -Kenya; Somewhere In Africa - Ghana; Queen's Desire - Nigeria
Achievement in Make-up	Achievement in Soundtrack
Shattered – Kenya; Rugged Priest - Kenya; State Research Bureau - Uganda; Adesuwa - Nigeria; Somewhere In Africa - Ghana	Alero's Symphony – Nigeria; Otelo Burning – South Africa; Adesuwa - Nigeria; How 2 Steal 2 Million - South Africa; Somewhere In Africa – Ghana
Achievement in Visual effects	Achievement in Sound
Adesuwa – Nigeria; Behind The Mask - Nigeria; Somewhere in Africa - Ghana; State Research Bureau - Uganda; Otelo Burning – South Africa	State Of Violence – South Africa; Otelo Burning – South Africa; How To Steal 2 Million - South Africa; Man on Ground - South Africa/Nigeria; Algiers Murder - South Africa
Achievement in Cinematography	Achievement in Editing
Otelo Burning – South Africa; How 2 Steal 2 Million - South Africa; Rugged Priest - Kenya; Masquerades - Ghana; Man on Ground – South Africa/Nigeria	How 2 Steal 2 Million- South Africa; Algiers Murder - South Africa; Man on Ground - South Africa/Nigeria; Unwanted Guest – Nigeria; Otelo Burning – South Africa; Alero's Symphony - Nigeria
Achievement in Screenplay	Best Nigerian film
Ties That Bind – Ghana; Mr & Mrs - Nigeria; How 2 Steal 2 Million - South Africa; Otelo Burning –South Africa; Unwanted Guest -Nigeria; Two Brides and a Baby - Nigeria	Adesuwa – Nigeria; Unwanted Guest -Nigeria; Family On Fire - Nigeria; Alero's Symphony - Nigeria; Phone Swap – Nigeria
Best film in an African language	Best Child Actor
State Of Violence - South Africa; Chumo - Tanzania; Family On Fire - Nigeria; Otelo Burning - South Africa; Asoni - Cameroon	Tshepang Mohlomi (Otelo Burning) – South Africa; Rahim Banda (Behind The Mask) - Nigeria; Reginna Daniels (Bank Job) - Nigeria; Benjamin Abemigisha (Jamaa) - Uganda; Rachael Nduhukire (Jamaa) - Uganda; Ayinla O. Abdulaheem (ZR-7) - Nigeria
Best Young/Promising Actor	Best Actor in a Supporting Role
Ivie Okujaye (Alero's Symphony) – Nigeria; Neo Ntatleno (State Of Violence) – South Africa; Iyobosa Olaye (Adesuwa) – Nigeria; Martha Ankomah (Somewhere in Africa) - Ghana; Thomas Gumede (Otelo Burning) – South Africa; Sihle Xaba (Otelo Burning) – South Africa	Fana Mokoena (Man on Ground) – South Africa/Nigeria; Rapulana Seiphemo (How 2 Steal 2 Million) – South Africa; Hafiz Oyetoro (Phone Swap) - Nigeria; Okey Uzoeshi (Two Brides and a Baby) - Nigeria; Godfrey Theobejane (48) - Nigeria; Lwanda Jawar (Rugged Priest) – Kenya
Best Actress in a Supporting Role	Best Actor in a leading Role
Terry Pheto (How 2 Steal 2 Million) – South Africa; Ebbe Bassey (Ties That Bind) - Ghana; Empress Njamah (Bank Job) - Nigeria; Ngozi Ezeonu (Adesuwa) - Nigeria; Thelma Okoduwa (Mr & Mrs) - Nigeria; Omotola Jalade Ekeinde (Ties That Bind) - Ghana	Majid Michel (Somewhere in Africa) – Ghana; Menzi Ngubane (How 2 Steal 2 Million) – South Africa; Chet Anekwe (Unwanted Guest) - Nigeria; Jafta Mamabolo (Otelo Burning) – South Africa; Karabo Lance (48) - South Africa; Wale Ojo (Phone Swap) - Nigeria; Hakeem Kae-Kazim (Man on Ground) – Nigeria/South Africa
Best Actress in a leading Role	Best Director
Rita Dominic (Shattered) – Nigeria; Nse Ikpe Etim (Mr & Mrs) - Nigeria; Yvonne Okoro (Single Six) - Ghana; Ama K. Abebrese (Ties That Bind) - Ghana; Uche Jombo (Damage) - Nigeria; Millicent Makheido (48) – Nigeria; Kudzai Sevenzo-Nyarai (Playing Warriors) - Zimbabwe	Charlie Vundla (How 2 Steal 2 Million) – South Africa; Lancelot Oduwa Imasuen (Adesuwa) - Nigeria; Leila Djansi (Ties That Bind) - Ghana; Bob Nyanja (Rugged Priest) - Kenya; Khalo Matabane (State Of Violence) – South Africa; Akin Omotoso (Man on Ground) – South Africa/Nigeria; Sara Bletcher (Otelo Burning) – South Africa

=== Special Jury Prize ===
- Man on Ground - South Africa/Nigeria
