= Chelsea (film) =

- Directed by: Moses Inwang
- Screenplay by: Afe Olumowe
- Story by: Abdul Salam Mumuni
- Produced by: Abdul Salam Mumuni
- Starring: Nadia Buari; Majid Michel; John Dumelo; Frank Artus
- Production company: Venus Films Production
- Release date: 2010
- Countries: Nigeria; Ghana
- Language: English

Chelsea is a 2010 Ghanaian direct-to-video thriller film directed by Moses Inwang, and starring Majid Michel, Nadia Buari & John Dumelo.

== Cast ==
- Majid Michel as Sylvester
- Brenda Bonsu as Katy
- John Dumelo as Marlon
- Nadia Buari as Chelsea
- Sa-Ada Sadiq as Cashier
- Rispa Nyumutsu as Waitress
- Amanorbea Dodoo as Chelsea Mum
- Roger Quartey as Chauffeur
- Jonathan Pali Sherren as Chelsea Dad
- Dan Tei-Mensah as Greg
- Artus Frank as Gideon (Chelsea’s Brother)

== Reception ==
Nollywood Reinvented gave it a rating of 2.5 out of 5 stars. It gave a 0/5 originality rating and explained further that "...The movie Chelsea is apparently a rip of the 2008 Bollywood movie Mehbooba starring Ajay Devgn (in Majid’s character), Manisha Koirala (as Nadia Buari) and Sanjay Dutt (as John Dumelo)."

NollywoodForever gave it an 82% rating. The site noted the actors and actresses were well cast and enjoyable to watch, both for their acting talent and their good looks.
