= Make a Move (film) =

2014 Nigerian dance musical film

- Theatrical poster
- Directed by: Niyi Akinmolayan
- Produced by: Ivie Okujaye
- Starring: Ivie Okujaye; Tina Mba; Beverly Naya; Wale Adebayo
- Cinematography: Austin Nwaolie
- Production company: Avizzle Productions
- Release dates: 29 May 2014 (Lagos Premiere); 6 June 2014 (Nigeria)
- Country: Nigeria
- Languages: English; Bini

Make a Move is a 2014 Nigerian dance musical film produced by Ivie Okujaye and directed by Niyi Akinmolayan. It stars Ivie Okujaye, Tina Mba, Beverly Naya, Wale Adebayo, Victor Godfery, Helga Sosthenes and Eno Ekpenyong, with special appearances from Majid Michel, Denrele Edun, 2face Idibia and Omawumi Megbele.

== Plot ==
Make a Move tells the story of Osas and Eseosa who come from troubled homes. Osas finds comfort in dancing and uses it as a means to get away from her many problems including her home, which is falling apart.

== Cast ==
- Ivie Okujaye as Osas
- Tina Mba
- Beverly Naya
- Wale Adebayo
- Victor Godfery
- Helga Sosthenes as Esosa
- Eno Ekpenyong as Chuma
- Majid Michel
- Denrele Edun
- 2face Idibia
- Omawumi Megbele

== Reception ==
=== Critical reception ===
The film received generally negative critical reviews. It got a 39% rating on Nollywood Reinvented, which stated: "The major flaw of this movie comes with its presentation of the emotions. It's in the music, it's in the directing, it's in the atmosphere that the movie sets or doesn’t set earlier on. In the first third of the movie, the direction seemed haphazard. It was almost as though the fast-paced scenes were happening faster than the camera could follow, if that was intentional it did not come off as skilled nor did it help the mood". Olamide Jasanya of The Nigeria Entertainment Today gave a rating of 2 out of 5 stars, stating that the story is basic and focused too much on one character. He faulted the character development, said the cinematography was poor in some scenes but beautiful in most other scenes and concluded: "Akinmolayan may have learnt his lesson from the heavy criticism his 2010 sci-fi movie Kajola fetched him, so he took a rather realistic approach with this movie and it turned out well, with some new and unusual camera shots, he however didn’t do well at evoking emotions from the characters, neither did he pay enough attention to continuity". Isabella Akinseye comments: "Make a Move was met with very high expectations. Unfortunately, the movie disappoints with its averagely choreographed sequences, script loopholes and unconvincing acting by most of the cast. On a positive note, the movie makes a case against domestic abuse. For Ivie [Okujaye], it's one step forward, two steps back".

Wilfred Okiche of YNaija panned everything about the film and commented: "Make a Move has a plot and story that manages to stay on course but the film is so dull and formulaic that almost nothing is exciting. The screenplay is mostly unchallenging and for its entire running time, the film plays like it is directed at 12 year olds," "the end result is cluttered and clumsy with awkward takes and uncomfortable moments. Akinmolayan just directs scene for scene by rote, bringing with him no particular excitement or even film experience".

=== Accolades ===
The film received three nominations at the 2014 Nollywood Movies Awards, including Best Movie, Best Actor (Supporting Role) for Wale Adebayo and Best Child Actor for Helger Sosthenes. It was also nominated in two categories at the 2015 Africa Magic Viewers Choice Awards.

Complete list of Awards
Award	Category	Recipients and nominees	Result
Nollywood Movies Network (2014 Nollywood Movies Awards)	Best Movie	Niyi Akinmolayan	Nominated
Nollywood Movies Network (2014 Nollywood Movies Awards)	Best Actor (Supporting Role)	Wale Adebayo	Nominated
Nollywood Movies Network (2014 Nollywood Movies Awards)	Best Child Actor	Helger Sosthenes	Nominated
Multichoice (2015 Africa Magic Viewers Choice Awards)	Best Movie (Drama)	Niyi Akinmolayan	Nominated
Multichoice (2015 Africa Magic Viewers Choice Awards)	Best Actress in a Drama	Ivie Okujaye	Nominated

== See also ==
- List of Nigerian films of 2014
