= 4 Play (film) =

2010 Nigerian romantic comedy film

- Ghanaian release poster
- Directed by: Frank Rajah Arase
- Screenplay by: Pascal Amanfo
- Story by: Frank Rajah Arase
- Produced by: Abdul Salam Mumuni; Christopher Ozoemena
- Starring: Jackie Appiah; John Dumelo; Majid Michel; Yvonne Okoro; Roselyn Ngissah; Juliet Ibrahim
- Cinematography: Adams Umar
- Music by: Bernie Anti
- Production companies: Venus Film Production; De-Kross Movie Production
- Distributed by: De-Kross Films
- Release date: 2010
- Running time: 112 minutes
- Countries: Ghana; Nigeria
- Language: English

4 Play (Reissued in Nollywood as 4 can Play by De-Kross Movies for international distribution) is a 2010 Nigerian Ghanaian romantic blue comedy film directed by Frank Rajah Arase, starring Majid Michel, Yvonne Okoro, John Dumelo, Jackie Appiah, Roselyn Ngissah and Juliet Ibrahim. The film is followed by a sequel titled 4Play Reloaded and was released in 2011. It received 3 nominations at the 2010 Ghana Movie Awards and eventually won the award for Best Actress in a Leading Role.

== Cast ==
- Majid Michel as Alvin
- John Dumelo as Rex
- Jackie Appiah as Jezel
- Yvonne Okoro as Ruby
- Juliet Ibrahim as Nivera
- Roselyn Ngissah as Angie
- Jesse Sarpong as Kojo
- Kalsum Sinare as Jezel's mum
- Omar Sherif Captain as Jake
- Roger Quartey as Barrister Dickson
- George Attipoe as Jason
- Helen Asante as Diana
- Mercy Kaponde as Jade

== Plot ==
Things were going well between Ruby and her wife until an anonymous caller informed her of jayke's infidelity. It turns out her husband has a gay partner.

== Reception ==
modernghana.com commended the acting and directing of the film.
