= My Name Is Kadi =

2016 Nigerian movie

My Name is Kadi
- Directed by: Bright Wonder Obasi
- Written by: Aisha Tisha Mohammed
- Produced by: Aisha Tisha Mohammed
- Starring: Blossom Chukwujekwu, Kenneth Okolie, Tina Mba and Sylvia Oluchy
- Release date: 2016
- Country: Nigeria
- Language: English

My Name is Kadi is a 2016 Nigerian drama film written by Aisha Tisha Mohammed and directed by Bright Wonder Obasi. The Hollywood African Prestigious Awards nominated film stars Blossom Chukwujekwu, Kenneth Okolie, Tina Mba and Silvia Oluchy.

== Synopsis ==
The film revolves around a girl who misbehaves to the extent that she decided to leave her family and live by her own rules. She eventually met a responsible man who changed her, but she battles with different hurdles in keeping him.

== Cast ==
- Femi Afolabi as guy at the bar
- Ivy Blessing Agbo as lady at the restaurant
- Preach Bassey as Kenneth
- Jide Bolarinwa as Alh. Danjuma
- Benjamin Chiedu as Officer
- Blossom Chukwujekwu as Kwem
- Kelvin Godwin as guy at the restaurant
- Tina Mba as Mrs. Hamilton
- Aisha Mohammed as Kadi
- Obinna Nwaka as Kelvin
- Kenneth Okolie as Tyler
- Sylvia Oluchy as Jumai
- Chineye Onah as Medinna
- Bella Onuh as lady at the bar
- Vincent Opurum as Minister
- Josephine Ramos as Dami
- Gertrude Seibi as Waiter

== Premiere ==
The film premiered at the Sheraton Hotel, Abuja in June 2016. In attendance were former Information Minister, Lai Mohammed, Josephine Ramos, Desmond Utomwen, Grace Amaiye, Femi Gbajabiamila and Desmond Elliot.

== Awards and nominations ==
My name is Kadi got three nominations at the 2017 Hollywood and African Prestigious Awards, in California and it won the Most Outstanding Actress in a Motion Picture Award
