= Beyond Blood =

2016 Nigerian romantic drama

- Directed by: Greg Odutayo
- Written by: Debo Oluwatumininu
- Produced by: Debbie Odutayo
- Starring: Kehinde Bankole; Joseph Benjamin; Bimbo Manuel; Deyemi Okanlawon; Carol King; Wole Ojo; Shan George
- Cinematography: Kelvin Richard
- Edited by: Ralph Bamishile
- Music by: Truth
- Production companies: Royal Roots Communications; HF Media; The Script Kompany
- Release date: January 15, 2016
- Running time: 136 minutes
- Country: Nigeria
- Language: English

Beyond Blood is a 2016 Nigerian romantic drama film directed by Greg Odutayo, and starring Kehinde Bankole, Joseph Benjamin, Bimbo Manuel, Deyemi Okanlawon, Carol King, Wole Ojo and Shan George. It premiered on 14 January 2016 in Lagos, and was generally released on 15 January 2016.

== Cast ==
- Kehinde Bankole
- Joseph Benjamin
- Bimbo Manuel
- Deyemi Okanlawon
- Carol King
- Wole Ojo
- Shan George
- Francis Onwochei
- Uzor Osimkpa
