= In My Country (2017 film) =

2017 Nigerian action film

- Directed by: Frank Rajah Arase
- Written by: Kehinde Joseph Omoto
- Story by: Frank Rajah Arase°
- Produced by: Frank Rajah Arase
- Starring: Sam Dede; Bimbo Manuel; Okawa Shaznay; Austin Enabulele; Precious Udoh
- Cinematography: Austin Nwaolie
- Edited by: Afra Marley
- Production companies: Heros Production; Raj Films
- Release date: 2017 (Nigeria)
- Running time: 99 minutes
- Country: Nigeria
- Language: English

In My Country, is a 2017 Nigerian action film directed and produced by Frank Rajah Arase. The film stars Sam Dede, and Bimbo Manuel along with Okawa Shaznay, Austin Enabulele and Precious Udoh in supporting roles. The is about a teacher who needs to raise money for her daughter's life-saving surgery.

The film was critically acclaimed, and screened worldwide. In 2018 at the Africa Movie Academy Awards, the film received six nominations: Best Actor in a Leading Role, Best Actress in a Leading Role, Best Director, Best Nigerian Film, Best Young/Promising Actor, Achievement in Production Design and Best Film.

== Cast ==
- Sam Dede as Afam
- Bimbo Manuel as Minister
- Okawa Shaznay as Adesuwa
- Austin Enabulele as Okoti
- Precious Udoh as Eno
- Shan George as Sophia
- Beatrice Akonjom as Bank Manager
- Queen-Zoey Ansa as Doctor Suresh
- Victor Dominion as A.S.P.
- Georgina Ekpeyong as Mama Adesuya
- Noble Emmanuel as Remi
- Godwin Enyinnaya as Lawyer
- Eunice Etim as Radical Student
- Orok Etim as Rev. Bako
- Eme Eyamba as Doctor Franka
- Christian Julius as Stranger
- Fortune Luke as Mr. Miller
- Imaobong Maurice as Head Teacher
- Charles Onun as Inspector Ali
- Edak Tottsman as Commissioner
- Mina Umokoro as Jackie Okoro
