= Juliet Ibrahim =

Liberian-Lebanese actress

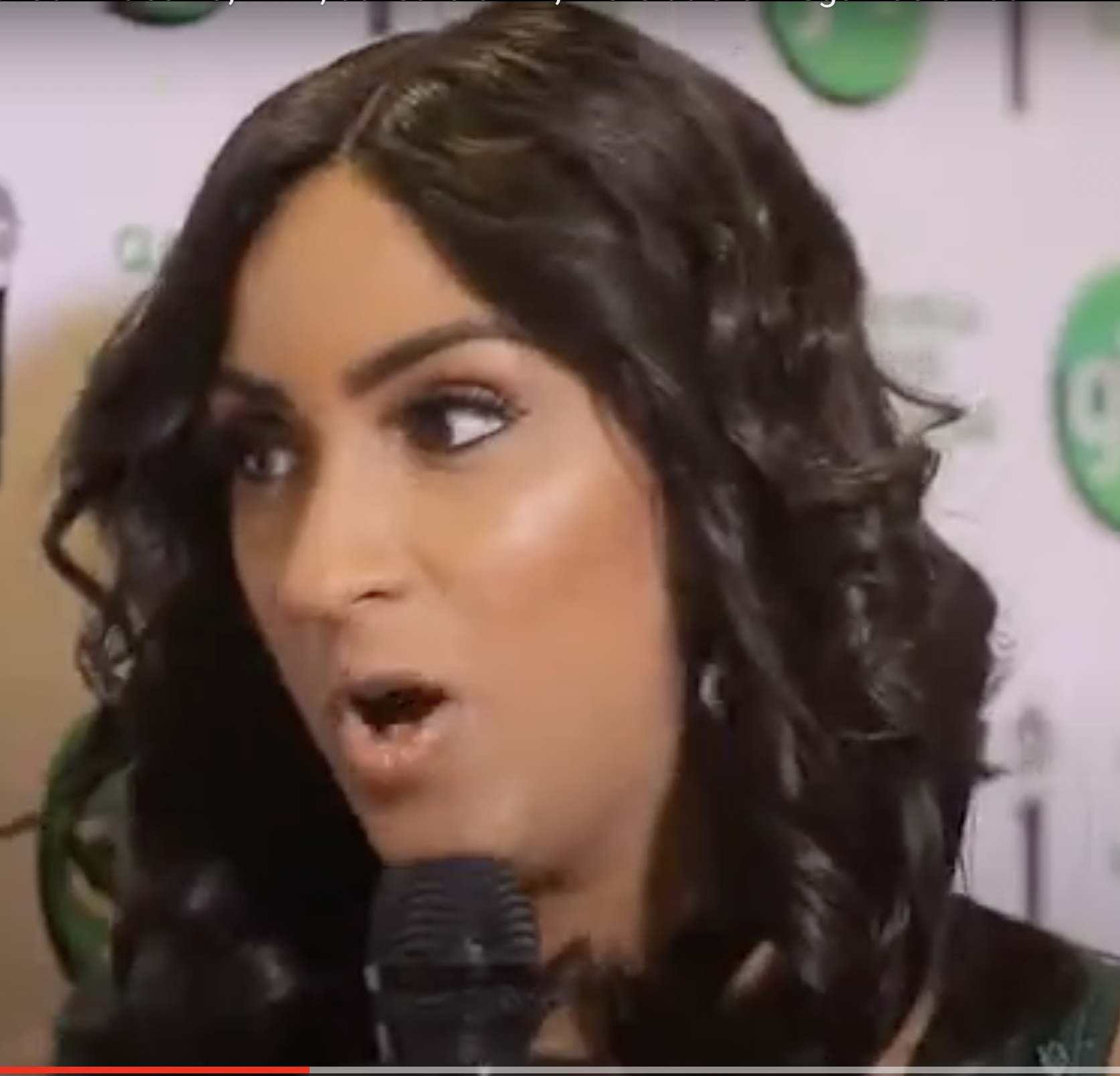
- Born: Juliet Ibrahim; Accra, Ghana
- Occupations: Actor, author, singer, film producer
- Years active: 2005–present
- Family: Sonia Ibrahim (sister)
- Awards: 2010: Achievement Award – City People Magazine, Accra; 2010: Ghana Movie Personality of the Year – City People Magazine, Lagos; 2010: Best Lead Actress in a movie – Ghana Movie Awards; 2014: Best Ghanaian Actress – City People Entertainment; 2016: Actress of the year – Starzzawards
- Website: julietibrahim.net/en

Juliet Ibrahim (born 3 March 1986) is a Ghanaian actress, film producer, influencer and singer. She won the Best Actress in a Leading Role award at the 2010 Ghana Movie Awards for her role in 4 Play.

== Early life and education ==
Juliet Ibrahim was born on 3 March 1986 to a Lebanese father and a Ghanaian-Liberian mother in Accra. She is the oldest child and has two sisters, including the actress Sonia Ibrahim, and a brother. Ibrahim and her siblings spent the longest part of their childhood in Lebanon and Ivory Coast due to civil wars. She had her primary education in Lebanon, then proceeded to Ivory Coast for her secondary education, where she lived with her parents. She studied at the Ghana Institute of Languages, where she studied English, French, and Spanish. She also studied marketing, Advertising, and Public Relations at the Ghana Institute of Journalism.

In 2025, Ibrahim earned her Bachelor of Business Administration in Marketing Communications from Berkeley College.

Ibrahim has commented that in Africa, she is not regarded as a black woman because of her skin tone, but outside Africa, she is recognized as being black. She objected to the term 'half-caste' and said that she was 'black and proud of it'.

== Career ==
Ibrahim made her acting debut in the 2005 film Crime to Christ starring Majid Michel. Her first Nollywood film was Yankee Boys, and she has featured in more than 50 films afterwards. In 2014, she produced her first film, Number One Fan, in which she stars as an actress being stalked by a fan in the film. Her second movie, Shattered Romance, which features Nigerian and Ghanaian actors, launched amidst fanfare in Accra, Ghana, on 5 December 2014. Her new TV series; Every Woman Has a Story, where she debuted her directorial skills, is airing on terrestrial TV. She has featured in Twi movies, in Yoruba language films, and also in Ladan Aure, a Hausa Language film.

She has been referred to as the "Most Beautiful West African Woman" according to A-listers Magazine.

== Recent roles and recognition ==
Ibrahim was appointed the first-ever President of Women in Film, Television and Media Ghana (WIFT Ghana), where she advocates for gender equity and the advancement of women in Ghana’s media, film, and television sectors.

She also joined the Advisory Boards of the Toronto International Nollywood Film Festival (TINFF) and the Brampton International Nollywood Film Festival (BINFF).

== Filmography ==
- Crime to Christ (2005) - Naomi
- In The Eyes of My Husband (2007) - Vanessa
- Yankee Boys (2008)
- Losing You (2008)
- Royal Storm (2009)
- Restore My Love (2009)
- Naked Weapon (2009)
- Dead End (2008)
- Lost Desire (2008) - Suzzy
- Blood Fight (2007)
- Beautiful King (2009)
- Tattoo Boys (2009)
- Missing Child (2009) - Princess Rose
- Honor My Will (2008)
- Cash Adventure (2008)
- Hidden (2009)
- Last Hope (DNA test) (2009)
- Marriage of sorrows (2009)
- Queen's Pride (2010)
- Enemy of My Soul (2009)
- Princess Rihanna (2010)
- Millions (2010)
- 4play (2010) - Nivera
- 4play reloaded (2010) - Nivera
- Crazy Scandal (2010)
- Beyond love (2010)
- Master of the Game (2011)
- Battle of love (2011)
- 30 Days in Atlanta (2014) - MD's Wife
- A Certain Night (2014) - Gail
- Number One Fan (2014) - Lala
- Shattered Romance (2015) - Suzanne
- Teens Life (2015)
- Anniversary (2015)
- Black Bride (2016)
- My Angel (2015) - Angela
- Perfect Crime (2017) - Mercy
- 10 days in sun city (2016)
- London Fever (2016)
- Ladan Noma (2016) - Clara
- Akpe: Return of the Beast (2019)
- Aki and Pawpaw (2021) - Brenda
- Red Carpet (2022)
- Nine (2023) - Ellis
- All's Fair in Love (2024) - Irene

== Awards and recognition ==
- 2010: Achievement Award – City People Magazine, Accra
- 2010: Ghana Movie Personality of the Year – City People Magazine, Lagos
- 2010: Best Lead Actress in a movie – Ghana Movie Awards
- 2014: Best Ghanaian Actress – City People Entertainment
- 2016: Actress of the year – Starzzawards

== See also ==
- List of Ghanaian actors
