= Jibola Dabo =

Nigerian film actor

- Born: Jibola Dabo; August 12; Lagos State, Nigeria
- Education: University of Lagos
- Occupation: Actor
- Notable work: Dirty Secrets
- Children: 1
- Awards: Zuma Film Festival for Best Actor of the Year

Jibola Dabo is a Nigerian actor who won the award for Best actor of the year at the Zuma Film Festival (ZUFF). He was described as a Nollywood veteran by a Vanguard media publication.

== Early life and education ==
Dabo was born in Lagos state, a geographical area of south-western Nigeria that is occupied predominantly by the Yoruba speaking people of Nigeria. Dabo is originally from Owo, a small town in Ondo State, Nigeria. Dabo received most of his formal education in Nigeria from elementary to college level. He graduated from the University of Lagos with a Bachelor’s Degree in Fine Arts. Dabo after his education in Nigeria pursued further education in the United States of America in pursuit of a Master’s Degree. He attended Columbia State University & graduated with a Master’s Degree in Mass Media.

== Career ==
Dabo reportedly started acting at the age of 6, in school, where he took part in stage dramas. Dabo’s official debut into the Nigerian movie industry, Nollywood was in 2006.

Dirty Secrets is a 2009 film featuring Dabo alongside Tonto Dikeh and the late actor Muna Obiekwe. The production is noted for its role in Dabo's career and the themes it addressed within the Nollywood industry at the time of its release.

== Awards ==
- Best actor of the year at the Zuma Film Festival (ZUFF).

== Political ambition ==
Dabo in 2015 had political aspirations to represent Owo federal constituency in Ondo State at the Federal House of Representatives In Nigeria.

== Personal life ==
Dabo & Binta Ayo Mogaji have a child together.

== Selected filmography ==
- Bloody Carnival
- My Fantasy (2010) as Sir Rufus
- Broken Mirror
- My Game
- High Blood Pressure (2010)
- Changing Faces
- Kingdom of Darkness
- Alero's Symphony (2011)
- Breaking Ranks (2014) as Simon
- Game Changer (2015)
- Dirty Secrets (with Tonto Dikeh & Muna Obiekwe).
- Queen of the World
- Fight Till the End (2019) as Chief Duke
- Abu (2020) as Zaddy
- Dwindle (2021) as Governor Otunta
- Shadow Parties (2021) as King of Aje Land
- Love Castle (2021) as President
- The Silent Baron (2022)
- Drink (2023)
- Time Left (2024) as Richard
