= The Elephant in the Room (book) =

Book

The Elephant in the Room: Evangelicals, Libertarians, and the Battle to Control the Republican Party
- Author: Ryan Sager
- Language: English
- Genre: Non-fiction
- Publisher: John Wiley & Sons
- Publication date: 2006

The Elephant in the Room: Evangelicals, Libertarians, and the Battle to Control the Republican Party (John Wiley & Sons, 2006) is a book by libertarian political columnist Ryan Sager.

In the book, Sager argues that the Republican Party, after President Bush, risks a split between its Libertarian and Evangelical wings. Whereas the party once held together ideologically through a bargain known as fusionism, under which libertarian and religious conservatives mutually sought to reduce the size and scope of government, that bargain is now in jeopardy because of the rise of so-called "big-government conservatives." Those big-government conservatives — typically southern, religious, and less educated — had by 2005 come to make up roughly one-third of the Republican coalition. Pandering to this new faction, Sager argues, threatens to permanently alienate the GOP's small-government base.

Sager further argues that the emerging split will manifest itself through a geographic realignment of the two major parties, with the libertarian-oriented and once reliably Republican Interior West — the eight states between the Pacific Coast and the Midwest: Arizona, Colorado, Idaho, Montana, Nevada, New Mexico, Utah and Wyoming — turning into a swing region.

In order to heal the Republican Party's rift, Sager argues, the GOP should renew its fusionist bargain. This would involve, in his view, embracing the concept of cultural federalism (allowing thorny moral issues such as gay marriage to be sorted out at the state level), backing off intrusive security measures in the war on terror, and committing to small-government policy reforms such as school choice.

== Reviews ==
The Elephant in the Room received positive reviews, being named one of the best books of 2006 by National Review.

== See also ==
- Elephant in the room
