= Sylvia Oluchy =

Nigerian actress

Sylvya Oluchy
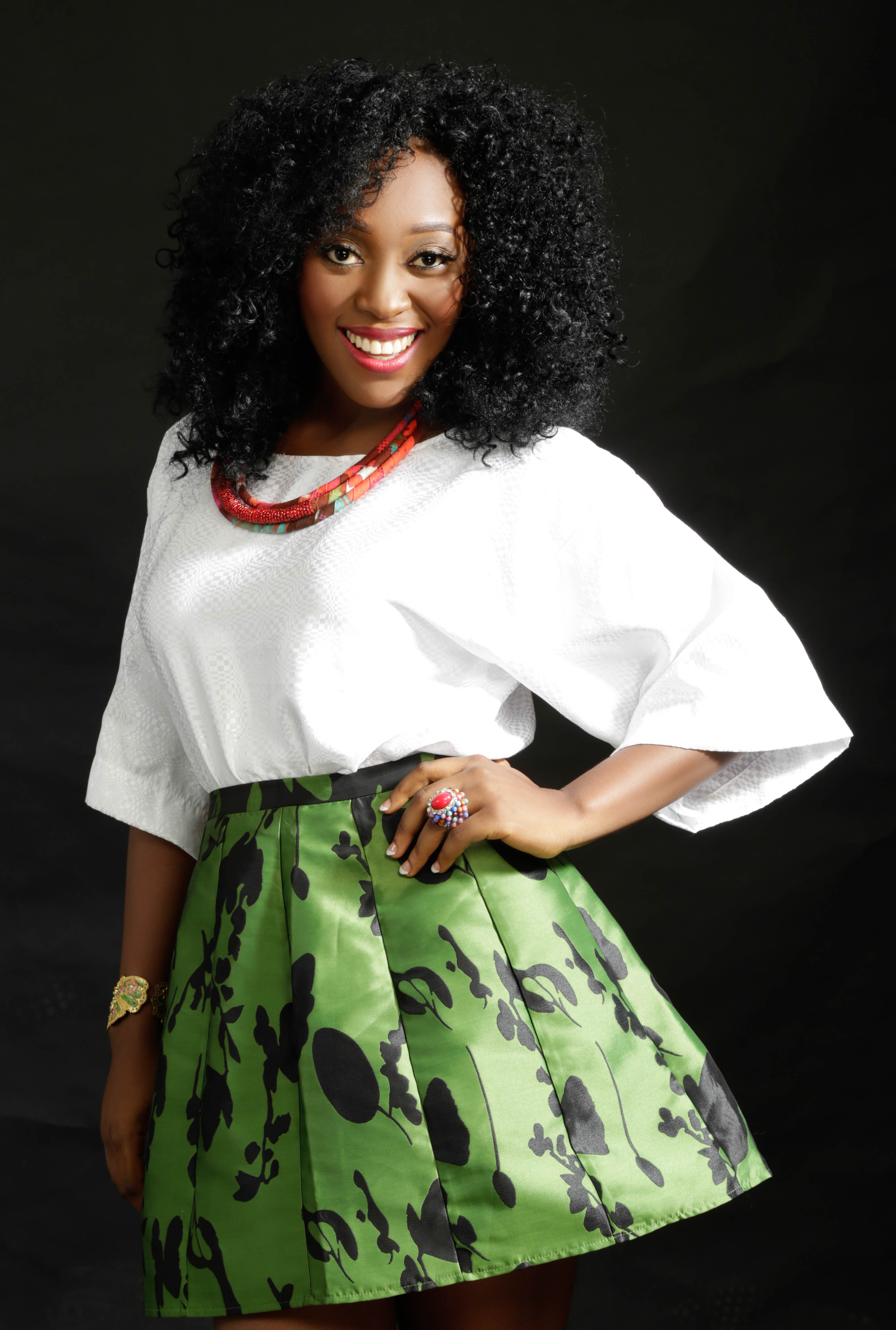
- Sylvya Oluchy
- Born: Ngozi Sylvia Oluchi Ezeokafor; 7 June; Abuja, Nigeria
- Education: theatre Arts, Nnamdi Azikiwe University
- Alma mater: Nnamdi Azikiwe University
- Occupation: Actress
- Years active: 2009–present
- Awards: Most Promising Act of the Year award in the Best of Nollywood Awards.
- Website: http://sylvyaoluchy.com/

Ngozi Sylvia Oluchi Ezeokafor, known professionally as Sylvya Oluchy, is a Nigerian actress, writer, producer and filmmaker. She won the Most Promising Act of the Year award in the Best of Nollywood Awards. She won the Rising Star award in the Nollywood Movies Awards.

== Early life ==
Oluchy was born in Abuja, Nigeria’s capital and raised in London, United Kingdom and Abuja, the federal capital territory of Nigeria. She studied theatre Arts at the Nnamdi Azikiwe University in Awka, Anambra State, southeastern Nigeria.

== Career ==
According to Oluchy, she never wanted to be an actress until her mom told her "You will make a good actress" after noticing her unique talent in mimicking her school teachers. In 2011, she played the role of Shaniqua in the popular Atlanta TV series. During interviews with Best of Nollywood Magazine and YES International Magazine, Oluchy made national headlines when asked if she had any boundaries or limits in her acting profession, she replied "I don’t have any boundaries because my body is my laptop. Others have their laptops and files, what I have are body and voice, Even the concept of nudity, I don’t have any problems whatsoever..."

== Filmography ==
Year	Film	Role	Notes
2009	Honest Deceiver	Lara	as Sylvia Oluchi
2009	Honest Deceiver 2	Lara	as Sylvia Oluchi
2010	Bent Arrows	Idara	Also Starring: Stella Damasus, Francis Ebiloma, Desmond Elliot, Ngozi Ezeonu
2011	Atlanta Series	Shaniqua	
2013	Alan Poza	Senami	
2013	On Bended Knees		Also Starring: Chioma Chukwuka, Seun Akindele, Chukwudi Leonard
2013	Playing Victim	Demeji's Girlfriend	
2014	Being Mrs Elliot	Nonye	
2015	Losing Control	Coco	
2015	Heroes and Villains		
2016	My Name is Kadi	Jumai	Also Starring: Blossom Chukwujekwu, Femi Afolabi, Jide Bolariwa
2018	Forbidden	Chinalu	TV Series
2019	In the Name of Love	Carol	Short
2020	Crossroads	Madam Daniel	Directed by Seyi Siwoku

== Awards ==
Year	Award	Category	Film	Result
2012	Nollywood Movies Awards	Rising Star Award	Bent Arrows	Won
2012	City People Entertainment Awards	Best New Actress		Won
2013	Best of Nollywood Awards	Most Promising Act of the Year (female)	On Bended Knees	Won

== See also ==
- List of Nigerian actors
