= The Room in the Elephant =

Coordinates: 50.4586°N 3.5241°W

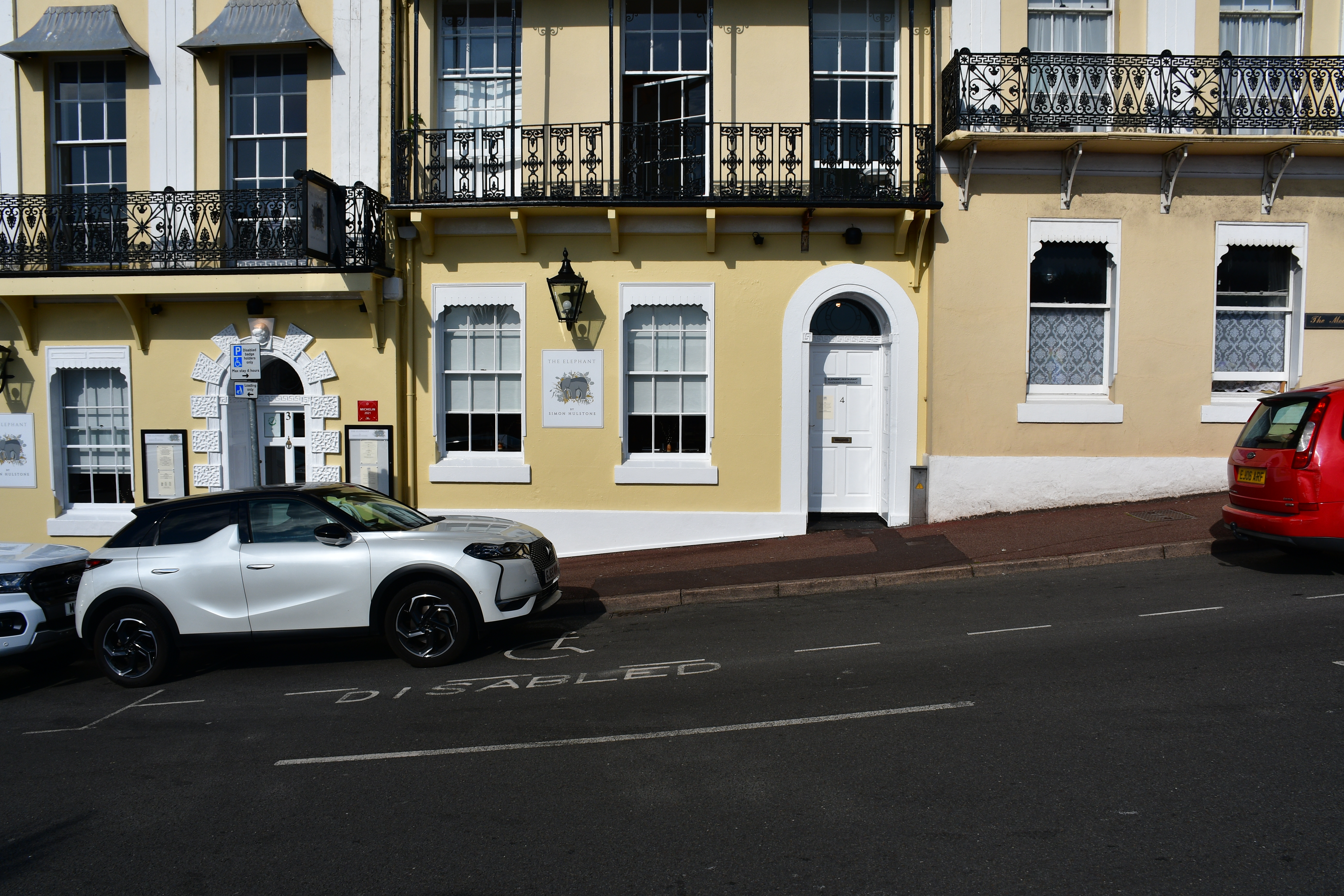
- The Room in the Elephant restaurant

Restaurant information
- Rating: (Michelin Guide 2008)
- City: Torquay, Devon
- Country: England

The Room in the Elephant is a restaurant in Torquay, Devon, England. As of 2008, the restaurant holds one star in the Michelin Guide.

== See also ==
- List of Michelin starred restaurants
