= 2016 All Nigerian Editors Conference =

- Genre: Conference
- Begins: 3 August 2016
- Ends: 7 August 2016
- Frequency: Annually
- Venue: Hotel Presidential
- Locations: Port Harcourt, Rivers State, Nigeria
- Years active: 2004–present
- Founded: 2004
- Organizer: Nigerian Guild of Editors (NGE)

The 2016 All Nigerian Editors Conference was the 12th annual edition of the All Nigerian Editors Conference (ANEC), the largest gathering of professional editors, organized by the Nigerian Guild of Editors (NGE). ANEC 2016 focused primarily on agriculture, as a counterfoil to the dwindling receipts from crude oil. The event, described as "a watering hole of ideas that have shaped government policies and programmes over the years" was hosted by Port Harcourt, Rivers State's capital. The opening took place on 3 August 2016 at the Hotel Presidential in the city, and the conference closed officially on 7 August 2016.

== Theme ==
Each year, the conference follows a specific theme. The theme for the year 2016 was Economic Diversification: Agriculture as Option for a Prosperous Nigeria.

== Attendees ==
Both local and foreign speakers including practicing farmers, agribusiness financiers and policy-makers as well as editors from organizations such as West African Editors Forum (WAEF), The African Editors' Forum (TAEF), World Editors Forum (WEF) and the World Association of Newspapers (WAN) attended the event.

=== Guests of honour ===
==== Special guest ====
Former Governor of Delta State, Emmanuel Uduaghan was invited as the special guest of honour in recognition of his role in utilizing agriculture and non-oil resources as alternative to crude oil while in office.

== Outcomes ==
The conference concluded on 7 August 2016 with a firm endorsement of agriculture as "the most viable option to adopt to revive the nation’s economy, create employment for the army of unemployed youths, and usher in prosperity for the country and its peoples". Governor of Rivers State, Ezenwo Nyesom Wike received commendations for his achievements in the areas of security and infrastructural development.
