= Ivie Okujaye =

Nigerian actress

- Born: 16 May 1987 (age 39); Benin City
- Occupations: Actress singer film producer scriptwriter
- Years active: 2010–present
- Spouse: Ezie Egboh (m. 2015)
- Children: 3

Ivie Okujaye Egboh (born 16 May 1987) is a Nigerian actress, film producer, scriptwriter, dancer, singer and activist. In 2009, she won the Amstel Malta Box Office (AMBO) reality TV show. She has been nicknamed "Little Genevieve" for her resemblance to actress Genevieve Nnaji. She won the Best Young Actor at the 8th Africa Movie Academy Awards.

== Early life and education ==
Okujaye was born in Benin City to a father from Delta State and a mother from Edo State, and is the youngest of five children. She has often stated that her parents wanted her to study medicine because several of her family members were medical practitioners. She spent the first ten years of her life in Benin before settling in Abuja. She had her primary education at Our Ladies of Apostle Private School and later attended Queen's College, Lagos. She studied economics at the University of Abuja.

Okujaye married Ezie Egboh in 2015.

== Career ==
Okujaye had been performing on stage years before her Nollywood debut. According to her, featuring in the Amstel Malta Box Office launched her career and paved the way for her first feature film, Alero's Symphony.

== Filmography ==
Year	Title	Role	Notes	Ref
2019	Cold Dish	Preye	with Evelyn Bada, Jibola Dabo	
2019	Kuvana	Lira		
2018	If I Am President	Umi		
2017	5th Floor	Nkem	Alongside Toni Tones and Emem Ufot	
2017	Dise's Secret	Dise		
2017	Slow Country	Kome	with Tope Tedela, Majid Michel, Sambasa Nzeribe	
2016	Oloibiri	Chisom		
2016	Valerie	Freda		
2015	7 Inch Curve			
2015	Heroes and Villains			
2014	Make a Move	Osas	Also produced the film	
2014	Burning Bridges	Rose	Rose	
2014	The Black Silhouette	Maro		
2013	The Volunteers		Earned her AMVCA nomination for best actress	
2013	Kamara's Tree	Vero Kamara		
2011	Alero's Symphony	Alero Coker	with Bimbo Manuel, Timi Richards	

=== TV shows ===
Year	Title	Role	Notes	Ref
2020	Enakhe	Enakhe Iwinosa	Africa Magic original	
2015	Hotel Majestic	Ivie/Alero		
2014	Dowry	Naomi	With OC Ukeje	
2013	How She Left My Brother		A 7-episode Sitcom	

== Awards ==
Year	Award	Category	Film	Result	Ref
2010	Best of Nollywood Awards	Most Promising Talent		Nominated	
2012	Africa Movie Academy Awards	Best Young Actor	Alero's Symphony	Won	
2013	Africa Magic Viewers Choice Awards	Trailblazer Award		Won	
2014	Africa Magic Viewers Choice Awards	Best Actress in a Drama	The Volunteers	Nominated	
2014	The Future Awards	Prize in Entertainment		Nominated	
2016	Zulu African Film Academy Awards	Best Supporting Actress		Won	
2017	2017 Best of Nollywood Awards	Best Actress in a Lead Role –English	Slow Country	Won	
2023	Africa Magic Viewers' Choice Awards	Best Supporting Actress	On Your Own	Nominated	

== See also ==
- List of Nigerian film producers
- List of Nigerian actors

Awards and achievements
Preceded by Edward Kagutuzi (2011)	Most Promising Actor Award; 2012	Succeeded by Belinda Effah (2013)
