= Paul Obazele =

Nigerian actor (born 1966)

- Born: Paul Obazele; 1966 (age 59–60); Lagos State, Nigeria
- Education: Auchi Polytechnic
- Occupation: Actor
- Notable work: Iyore
- Awards: City People Entertainment Awards

Paul Obazele is a Nigerian actor, philanthropist, and movie producer who once served as the president of the Association of Movie Producers (AMP) and at the end of his tenure as president of the Association of Movie Producers (AMP), he was appointed the president of the Edo Film Makers Association (EFMA). Obazele is the founder of Legends of Nollywood Awards (LNA). He was named “one of the most consistent faces on television” by the editorial team of TV Guide, which is a quarterly publication of the Nigerian Television Authority.

== Early life and education ==
Obazele, who hails from Edo State, a south-south geographical region of Nigeria occupied predominantly by the minority tribes in Nigeria, was born in Lagos State. Obazele, more precisely, is from Esan in Edo State and is the 5th born child in his family. Obazele attended secondary education at Anglican Grammar School, Ubulu Ukwu in Delta State, where he obtained his West African Senior School Certificate, and Obazele obtained a degree in Business Administration from Auchi Polytechnic.

== Career ==
Obazele’s passion for acting and movie-making became ignited when he was an undergraduate at Auchi Polytechnic. Obazele revealed in an interview that his father vehemently opposed his goal to become an actor. Obazele, due to objections from his father, temporarily dismissed his goal of being an actor and instead secured a daytime job at a production company. Obazele would later go against his father’s orders and in 1994 officially join the Nigerian movie industry and debut his acting career with the movie titled Shadow of Death, a movie directed by Bolaji Dawudu in which he played the lead role. In 1999, he was already an established actor and started to direct movies. A Guardian media publication in 2016 published a piece that stated Obazele had featured in 200 movies.

== Award ==
Obazele was awarded the City People Movie Special Recognition Award at the City People Entertainment Awards in 2017.

== Personal life ==
Obazele is married with children and when he isn’t working, he spends his free time with his family. Obazele’s hobbies include watching films and listening to music.

== Selected filmography ==
- The Legend of Inikpi (2020) Oba Esigie
- Night Bus to Lagos (2019)
- Iyore (2015) as Oba Izuwe
- If Only (2014) as Landlord
- Invasion 1897 (2014)
- Political Control (2006)
- Cry Of A Virgin (2006)
- Family Affair (2006)
- Power Must Change Hands (2006)
- All My Heart (2005)
- Hidden Treasures (2005)
- Faithful Love (2004)
- Masterstroke (2004) as Ralph
- Life in New York (2004)
- The Champ (2004) as Tony
- Ashanti (2003)
- Dangerous Babe (2003) as Stevie
- Last Weekend (2003)
- Wanted Alive (2001)
- Set-Up (2000)
- Brotherhood of Darkness (1995) as James
- Kòseégbé (1995)
- I Need a Husband (1994) as Tega
- Black Maria (1994)
