= Apaye =

2014 Nigerian biographical drama film

Apaye (A Mother's Love)
- Theatrical poster
- Directed by: Desmond Elliot; Niyi Akinmolayan
- Screenplay by: Vivian Chiji; Uduak Isong Oguamanam; Kehinde Joseph
- Produced by: Emem Isong
- Starring: Kanayo O. Kanayo; Mbong Amata; Belinda Effah; Clarion Chukwura
- Production company: Emem Isong Productions
- Distributed by: Royal Arts Academy; Silverbird Distributions
- Release date: 7 March 2014
- Country: Nigeria
- Language: English

Apaye (English: A Mother's Love) is a 2014 Nigerian biographical drama film directed by Desmond Elliot and starring Clarion Chukwura, Kanayo O. Kanayo, Belinda Effah, and Mbong Amata. It premiered at the Silverbird Cinemas, Victoria Island, Lagos on 7 March 2014. The film tells the story of the life and struggles of Elder Irene Yepayeye Uriah-Dieah, who was a relative of Goodluck Jonathan.

== Plot ==
Yepayeye, a single mother of six, struggles to overcome many challenges and eventually triumphs in ensuring the uprightness and education of her kids.

== Cast ==
- Kanayo O. Kanayo as Emman
- Clarion Chukwura as Yepayeye
- Belinda Effah as Young Yepayeye
- Mbong Amata as Suam
- Caro Michael as Small Yepayeye

== Reception ==
Nollywood Reinvented gave the film a 53% rating, praising the storyline, direction and music. It concluded that despite low expectations from movies generally, Apaye succeeded in being a "pleasant surprise".
