= Knocking on Heaven's Door (2014 film) =

- Theatrical release poster
- Directed by: Desmond Elliot
- Screenplay by: Vivian Chiji; Uduak Isong Oguamanam; Anthony Kehinde Joseph
- Story by: Emem Isong
- Produced by: Ini Edo; Emem Isong
- Starring: Majid Michel; Adesua Etomi; Blossom Chukwujekwu; Ini Edo
- Edited by: Uche Alexmoore
- Music by: George Nathaniel
- Production company: Achievas Entertainment
- Distributed by: Royal Arts Academy
- Release date: 18 April 2014
- Country: Nigeria

Knocking on Heaven's Door is a 2014 Nigerian musical romantic drama film written by Vivian Chiji, produced by Emem Isong and directed by Desmond Elliot, starring Majid Michel, Adesua Etomi and Blossom Chukwujekwu. The film premièred on 18 April 2014 at Silverbird Galleria, Victoria Island, Lagos.

It tells a story of the marital relationship between Debbie (Adesua Etomi) and Moses (Blossom Chukwujekwu), and how an untold story from Moses' past tries to jeopardize their seemingly flawless union. The story takes an intriguing turn when a music producer Thomas Dacosta (Majid Michel) enters into their lives.

== Plot ==
Debby (Adesua Etomi) and Moses (Blossom Chukwujekwu) are a married couple; both are vibrant gospel singers, but Moses constantly hits Debby, such that he has made her suffer a miscarriage four consecutive times already. It gets worse as Debby becomes the much more successful gospel artiste in the music industry. Debby refuses to let anyone know about the violent marriage, not wanting her husband to be judged, and trying everything possible to improve on herself, waiting on God's miracle.

She meets Thomas (Majid Michel), a secular music producer, an ardent smoker, who claims he is an addict. Thomas wants Debby to be signed in his label, an offer she vehemently refuses, but Thomas won't back off. Moses starts noticing Debby and Thomas together and he starts to get jealous, sighting Debby's new fire when they make love, even though Debby has assured that there's nothing to be worried about; Moses becomes more violent regardless. Debby leaves home to Wunmi's (Leelee Byoma) place; Debby's closest friend, the family's doctor, and a church member who has become aware of what's going on. Debby eventually returns to Moses, after his endless apologies.

On their way back from a media interview, Moses accuses Debby of patronizing him during the interview; when Debby apologizes to avoid a fight, he accuses her of pitying him. After a heated argument, he drops Debby in the middle of the road. Thomas sees Debby walking and he teases her until she agrees to accept a ride to his home. In his home, Thomas convinces Debby to change from gospel to inspirational music and join his label. After the formal discussions, Thomas shows Debby around his house and they both get cozy with each other. Thomas brings up the issue of her violent husband revealing that he knows. He asks her why she's still with him, and she explains that she's worried about what the church and the society would think, as she's a role model to millions around the world. Thomas advises her to think about herself, do what she thinks is right and move on; he warns her that Moses might end up killing her. When they're about to leave to sign the record deal, Thomas kisses her; she feels disgusted and slaps him, Thomas apologizes.

Debby signs the record deal, with an appointment for 8am the next morning. Thomas takes her home very late in the night, telling her to forget the kiss ever happened. Debby enters the house to pack her belongings, but Moses again pleads for a last chance. She forgives him and tells him about the record deal and her appointment for next morning. Debby wakes up at 7:15am, only to find all her clothes socked in water in the bathtub, and Moses nowhere to be found. She puts on Moses shirt and trousers, so she can meet up with the appointment.

== Cast ==
- Majid Michel as Thomas Da'Costa (Tom)
- Adesua Etomi as Debbie
- Blossom Chukwujekwu as Moses
- Ini Edo as Brenda
- Robert Peters as Pastor
- Lelee Byoma as Wunmi
- Ozzy Agu as Mr. Cho
- Femi Knight as Artiste
- Christopher Ezirim as Chef
- Izuchukwu Anozie as D19
- Emeka Duru as Moses' Father
- Jessica Raymond as Moses' Mother
- Dozie Okafor as Young Moses
- Donald Edet as Police
- Ajoku Chiedu as Police
- Steve 'Yaw' Onu as Yaw (Guest appearance)

== Music and soundtrack ==
Knocking on Heaven's Door

Soundtrack album by George Nathaniel
- Released: Unreleased
- Genre: Film soundtrack
- Producer: George Nathaniel

=== Track listing ===
- "There's Power"
- "Ose i e" - Ranti Ihimoyan
- "Help is on the Way" - Evaezi
- "Gbo Ohun" - Evaezi
- "Kabi O Osi" - Evaezi
- "My God Do Well" - Evaezi
- "I Will Hold on to Your Word" - Evaezi
- I Need You Now" - Ranti Ihimoyan, Evaezi, Ochuko Ogbu-sifo
- "Jesus Loves Me" -
- "I Am Free" - Evaezi, Pita
- "What They Say You Are" - Pita
- "Stand By Me" - George Nathaniel
- "Speak to Me" - George Nathaniel

== See also ==
- List of Nigerian films of 2014
