= Frank Rajah Arase =

Nigerian film director

- Born: Frank Rajah Efosa Arase; Benin City, Nigeria
- Citizenship: Nigerian
- Occupation: Film director
- Notable work: Iyore; The Legend of Inikpi; Bound

Frank Rajah Efosa Arase is a Nigerian film director. Arase is a native of Edo State, Nigeria. He was nominated for Best Director at the 4th Africa Movie Academy Awards.

== Early life ==
Arase was born in Benin City, Edo, Nigeria. He grew up in Lagos where he started his film career.

== Career ==
Arase ventured into the show business at a very young age. He started out as a theatre practitioner in Nigeria; he was a dancer for National Theatre troupe and also acted in stage plays. He met Nollywood actor and director Paul Obazele, who groomed him in the film industry. He initially was an actor, featuring in films such as Scores To Settle, After School Hours. His love for being behind the scenes drew him into directing his own films. After directing a few films in Nigeria, he agreed to direct a film for Ghana's production company, Venus Films, after turning down previous attempts made by the Company. He directed the film titled Official Prostitute in Ghana and continued to make films in Nigeria after that.

Eventually, Abdul Salam Mumuni of Venus Films proposed a two-year contract to Arase, which involved introducing Ghanaian actors into the mainstream Nollywood film industry and making them have a star power comparable to Nigerian actors. Ghanaian actors that became famous through this collaboration include: Jackie Appiah, Van Vicker, Majid Michel, Nadia Buari, John Dumelo, Kalsoume Sinare and Kofi Adjorlolo amongst others. The contract was extended for another two years which led to the introduction of more actors like Yvonne Nelson, Juliet Ibrahim, Frank Artus and Martha Ankomah. Films produced during this period include: Mummy’s Daughter, Beyonce, Heart of Men, The Game, Who Loves Me?, Princess Tyra, The King is Mine, Agony of Christ, Crime to Christ and many others. The films are co-produced with Arase's production company, Raj and Heroes Films. After his contract with Venus Film expired, he continued with his own productions through his outfit, which has since released notable films such as Somewhere in Africa and the film Iyore.

== Personal life ==
Arase is the second child of the family. He is married to a Sierra Leonean lady and his family is based in Nigeria. Arase is currently based in Accra, Ghana and Lagos, Lagos State.

== Filmography ==
- Return of Beyonce (2006)
- Mummy's Daughter (2006)
- Princess Tyra (2007)
- Crime to Christ (2007)
- Passion of the Soul (2008)
- Heart of Men (2009)
- Agony of Christ (2009)
- Delilah (TV series)
- 4 Play (2010)
- Temptation (2010)
- The Game (2010)
- Somewhere in Africa (2011)
- The Groom's Bride (2012)
- The Price (2013)
- The Will (2013)
- Iyore (2014)
- Scars (2015)
- Ghana Must Go (2016)
- In My Country (2017)
- Bound (2018)
- The Legend of Inikpi (2020)
- Red Carpet (2022)
- A Taste of Sin (2023)
- The Scuffle (2023)
