= Uru Eke =

Nigerian actress (born 1979)

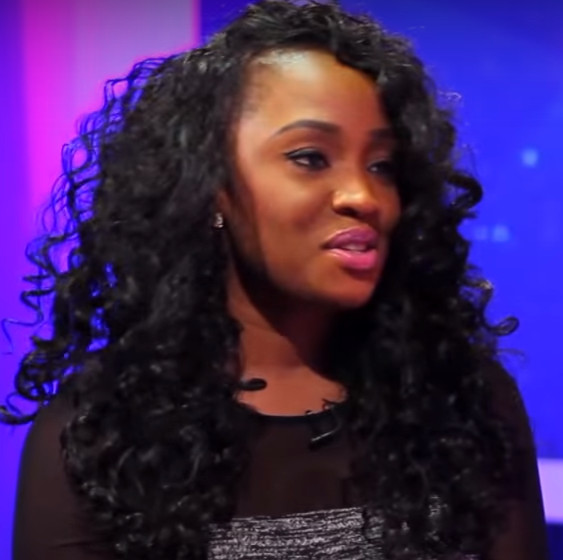
- Born: 11 October 1979 (age 46); Newham, East London
- Education: Business Information Technology, University of Greenwich
- Occupations: Actress and film producer
- Known for: Her role as Obi on Rumour Has It
- Notable work: Last Flight to Abuja

Uru Eke // (born October 11, 1979) is a Nigerian actress and film producer. She is known for her producing debut Remember Me, her role as Obi in Ndani TV's popular web series Rumour Has It, Last Flight to Abuja, Africa Magic's Drama series Baby Drama and her second film as a producer, For Old Times' Sake. The actress, who was an IT professional before joining Nollywood, still shares her time between the Entertainment industry and the Tech world.

== Early life and education ==
Eke is a descendant of the Mbaise region of Imo State, South-Eastern Nigeria, but she was born in Newham, East London in the United Kingdom. She had her basic education at Galleywall Infants School, London, before she moved to Nigeria where she attended Gideon Comprehensive High School for her secondary school education. In furtherance of her education, she returned to London and attended Lewisham College before proceeding to the University of Greenwich where she studied Business Information Technology.

== Career ==
Eke started her career as an IT consultant at Zurich Insurance Group and proceeded to work in a number of financial organizations across the UK. She switched careers in 2011 and has gone on to star in several movies.

== Films ==
- African Soldier (2007) as Princess Uloma
- Forgive Me Father (2009) as Elsie
- Last Flight to Abuja (2012) as Ijeoma
- Being Mrs Elliot (2014) as Fisayo
- A Few Good Men (2014) as Ivie
- Weekend Getaway (2012) as Uduak
- Finding Love (2014)
- The Duplex (2015) as Dora
- Silver Rain (2015) as Loreal
- Remember Me (2016) Produced and also acted as Harida Cole
- Rumour Has It (2016) as Obi
- 7 Days in a Coma (2017) as Anita
- Crazy, Lovely, Cool (2018)
- Africa Magics Baby Drama
- For Old Times' Sake (2019) as Catherine
- Jumper (2020) as Sade Adeyanju
- Man of Her Match (2021)
- Brutal Decision (2021) as Kella
- Wedding Night (2022) as Angela
- Virtue of Ignorance (2022) as Ada
- The Trade (2023) as Blessing

== See also ==
- List of Nigerian actors
- List of Nigerian film producers
