= Okey Bakassi =

Nigerian actor, comedian

- Born: Okechukwu Anthony Onyegbule; 23 October 1969 (age 56); Imo state
- Other name: okey bakassi
- Citizenship: Nigerian
- Occupation: Comedian
- Known for: A Night Of a Thousand Laughs
- Spouse: Ezinne
- Website: https://okeybakassi.com/

Okechukwu Anthony Onyegbule, popularly known as Okey Bakassi (born 23 October 1969) in Imo state is a Nigerian stand-up comedian and actor. In 2014, he won the "Best Actor in a Leading Role (Igbo)" category at the 2014 edition of the Best of Nollywood Awards for his role in the film Onye Ozi.

== Early life and education ==
Born on October 23, 1969, Okey is the eldest of five children to Mr. Livinus Onyegbule, a retired military officer, and Mrs. Felicia Onyegbule, a retired nurse, in Mbaise. He commenced his educational journey at Alvan Ikoku Demonstration School, obtaining his First School Leaving Certificate. He subsequently attended Mbaise Secondary School, Imo State, before transferring to Federal Government College, Port Harcourt, Rivers State, where he secured his West African Senior School Certificate.

After secondary school, he secured admission into the Rivers State University, Port Harcourt, to study Agricultural Engineering. The program lasted five years, and he graduated in 1992.Upon completion of his studies, he was deployed to Lagos for the National Youth Service Corps (NYSC) program and served at the Nigeria Industry Development Bank.

== Personal life ==
Okey has been married to his wife, Ezinne, for 17 years and they have three children. His family stays in Canada where his wife completed her education and currently works.

== Career ==
His passion for showbiz began at Federal Government College in Port Harcourt, where he would often crack jokes and leave his classmates and the entire school amused. However, it wasn't until he attended university that his interest truly took center stage. He joined a group called Theatre Colleagues, participating in stage plays and stand-up comedy sketches. Those were his early days, driven solely by a desire for creative expression and fun, rather than financial gain. He remained in Lagos after his National Youth Service Corps (NYSC), and met Zeb Ejiro a Director and Producer, who gave him his first TV role in 1993's 'Fortune.' He played Nick, a Johnsons' bodyguard, for 11 episodes before transitioning to the home video industry

He produced and appeared in several films, including 'Final Decision' (1996) and 'All for Winnie' (1998). His career gained momentum in 2014 with 'Onye Ozi', directed by Obi Emelonye, earning him his first award, "Best Actor in a Leading Role (Igbo)" category at the 2014 edition of the Best of Nollywood Awards. He has been featured in different movies and also has a recurring role in the comedy television show 'My Flat mate' produced and co-directed by his colleague Basketmouth.

Given his exploits with comedy during his school days made his venture into the stand-up comedy world easy. He made his stand-up comedy debut in 1995, when he collaborated with Opa Williams and Reginald Ebere on 'Nite of a Thousand Laughs,' a stand-up comedy show hosted in different part of Nigeria, launching his career.

Okey hosts two shows: 'It's Okay with Okey' on Lagos Talks 91.3FM, a daily comedy program featuring Accapella and Senator Comedian, and 'The Other News' on Channels TV.

== Political career ==
In 2012, he stepped away from the spotlight to focus on public service, serving as Senior Special Adviser on Entertainment Matters to the Governor Ikedi Ohakim of Imo State.

== Filmography ==
Year	Title	Role
1997	Pam Pam	
1998	Yogo Pam Pam	
1998	Kiss me quick	Lokko
1999	Hooligans	
1999	Endtime	Ojo
2003	Drummer	
2003	Ngozi: Abeg Marry Us	
2005	9 wives	Titus
2006	Chicken Madness	
2006	Four forty	Dodo
2006	Store keeper	
2007	Fools On Run	
2007	How Far?	
2007	I need a Husband	
2013	Onye Ozi	Metumaribe Onuigbo
2017	My Flatmates	Oga Nduka
2021	Badamasi (portrait of General)	Chief Arthur Nzeribe
2023	Bank Alert	Sammy Okereke
2024	Wives on strike: The uprising	

== See also ==
- List of Nigerian actors
- List of Nigerian comedians
