= Shan George =

Nigerian actress

- Born: Shan George; 21 April 1970 (age 56)
- Education: University of Ibadan
- Occupations: Actress, singer, producer, director
- Years active: 1996–present

Shan George (born 21 April 1970) is a Nigerian Nollywood actress. Prior to debuting in the movie Thorns of Rose, she had previously featured in a 1997 soap opera titled Winds of Destiny. She is best known for her role in the movies Outkast and Welcome to Nollywood.

== Life and career ==
Shan George was born on 21 April 1970. She was born in Ediba, a town in Abi local government area of Cross River State, Nigeria; Shan was born to an Igbo mother and a British father. Controversial for having issues with her "love life", her first marriage was when she was 16. She attended Edanafa Secondary Commercial School, Ediba, Cross River, Nigeria. She is an alumnus of the University of Lagos where she studied Mass Communication and went on to produce her debut movie titled All For Winnie during her final year. Shan George was a renowned Nollywood actress, singer, film maker and director before debuting in the movie Thorns of Rose.

In 2010, Shan released her debut studio album titled Dance which got positive reviews from music critics. She presently has two children after being involved in several broken marriages. She is also the Founder/CEO of a tuition-free film school, Divine Shield Film Academy in Calabar, Nigeria.

== Selected filmography ==
=== Soaps ===
- Winds Of Destiny
- After The Storm
- Super Story (Revenge)

=== Films ===
- Thorns Of Rose (1996)
- All For Winnie
- Endtime (1999)
- A Second Time (2004)
- Outkast (2001)
- Blood Diamonds (2004)
- Welcome to Nollywood (2007)
- Travails of Fate (2006) as Isabella
- Made in Heaven
- General's Wife
- Wrong Number
- My Sweat
- London Forever (2004) as Rita
- Super Zebraman
- Highway To The Grave (2000) as Queen Mother
- Silent Killer
- High Street Girls
- Grand Mother
- Passionate Crime (2006) as Uduak Asogbuo
- One Good Man
- Do Good
- The Wages (2013) as Mama K
- Beyond Blood (2016)
- In My Country (2017) as Sophia
- The State (2019) as Commissioner
- Ghetto Blues (2020) as Vero
- The Academy (2021) as Madam Ejor
- 4:4:44 (2022) as Theresa's Mother
- Sword of God (2024) as Miriam

== Awards and nominations ==
- Mоѕt Aссlаіmеd Aсtrеѕѕ іn Nіgеrіа аt thе Аfrіса Моvіе Асаdеmу Аwаrdѕ (AMAA)
- Bеѕt Aсtrеѕѕ іn Nіgеrіа аt thе Аfrіса Маgіс Vіеwеrѕ Сhоісе Аwаrdѕ (AMVCA)
- Recipient of the Best Actreѕs Award аt thе Gоldеn Ісоn Моvіе Асаdеmу Аwаrdѕ (GIAMA)
- Nominated for the Best Act, Female (English) on the Cross River Movie Awards (CRIMA) – 2013
- Best Director on the Cross River Nollywood Awards (CRINA) – 2014
- Movie of the Year on the Cross River Nollywood Awards (CRINA) – 2014
- Best Producer on the Cross River Nollywood Awards (CRINA) – 2014
- Award Recipient on the Calabar Entertainment Conference (CEC) – 2019
- Actor of The Week by Don Dollar Entertainment – 2019
- Award Recipient on the Anneozeng Ogozi Aid Foundation (AOAF) – 2019

== See also ==
- List of Nigerian film producers
