= Elephant in the Room (2016 film) =

2016 Nigerian romantic comedy

- Theatrical release poster
- Directed by: Asurf Oluseyi
- Screenplay by: Patrick K. Nnamani
- Story by: Zainab Sheriff
- Produced by: RamseyFilms
- Starring: Ramsey Nouah; Zainab Sheriff
- Cinematography: Austin Nwaolie
- Edited by: Sholay AY-Orinde
- Production companies: RamseyFilms; Zedzee Multimedia
- Release date: 8 January 2016
- Running time: 108 minutes
- Country: Nigeria
- Language: English
- Budget: ₦10 million

Elephant in the Room is a 2016 Nigerian romantic comedy film directed by Asurf Oluseyi, and starring Ramsey Nouah and Zainab Sheriff in lead roles. The film, which was shot and set in Sierra Leone, was released on 8 January 2016.

== Synopsis ==
It tells the story of a beautiful model, Carolina George who finds it difficult getting a job after returning home from Europe. After several fruitless attempts, the job hunter finds herself in the life of an aging wealthy man with both their lives changing afterwards.

== Cast ==
- Ramsey Nouah as Benjamin Bangura
- Zainab Sheriff as Carolina George
- Michael Bonny Bassey as Benjamin Bangura Jr
