= Frank Artus =

Liberian actor

- Born: Gregory Artus Frank; 4 May 1979 (age 47); Montserrado County
- Education: AME University
- Occupation: actor
- Spouse: Prima Cooper Frank
- Children: 3

Gregory Artus Frank (born May 4, 1979), also known as Frank Artus, is a Liberian actor, director, and producer in the West African film industries.

== Early life and education ==
Frank was born in Montserrado County, Liberia. His nationality is Liberian. He attended college at AME University in Monrovia, obtaining a degree in Human Resources Management.

== Career ==
Frank began his career in Liberia. Shortly afterwards, he branched out to Ghana where he worked at Venus Films, then eventually moved on to shoot movies in Nigeria (Nollywood). After acting in minor roles in Liberia, Artus wrote, directed, and starred in the movie Juetey (Children's Business). In 2008, Juetey won six awards including best writer, best supporting actress, and movie of the year. Juetey was Frank's first attempt at screenwriting.

Since then, he has filmed more than 100 movies. He has been nominated for many awards and won the Best International Actor award for 2012 at the African Academy Awards. He also won the Hall of Grace Award 2013. One of his best-known films is 2012's Order of the Ring, in which he performed in the nude.

In 2015, Frank was presented with the Face of Africa Award as a well-known actor. He also received several awards, including the Humanitarian Figure Award from the Continental Award Committee for his contributions to the fight against ebola.

== Personal life ==
Frank is married to his childhood sweetheart Prima Cooper Frank and the couple currently has three kids, two girls and a boy who he named after his mentor, Indian actor Shah Rukh Khan.

== Selected filmography ==
- Agafe
- Agony of Birth
- Amaka Mustapha
- Anger Of A Prince
- Anointed Prince
- ATM Masters
- Beautiful Evil
- Beyond My Eyes
- Brave Mind (2012) as Ted
- Brides's War
- Chelsea (2010) as Gideon
- Crazy Scandal
- Desperate Brides
- Die With Me
- Different Class
- Dirty Secret
- Family Secret
- Fear Untold
- Game Mistress
- Game of Roses
- Game On
- Guilty Threat
- Hands of Fate (2012) as Ted
- Holy Secret
- Illicit Ways
- Innocent Sin
- Jewels of the Sun (2011) as Jones
- Juetey
- king and gods
- King's Throne
- Kiss and the Brides
- Kiss My Tears
- Lost In Thoughts (2013)
- Mad Dog
- Madam Success
- Midnight Murder
- Mission of Justice
- Money Never Sleeps
- My Diva (2013) as Deejay
- My Dying Day
- My Husband Funeral
- Mystery of Destiny
- Native Daughter
- New Joy
- Order of the Ring (2013) as Perry
- Owerri Soup
- Professional Lady
- Professionals
- Rain Drop (2011) as Lover
- Right In My Eyes
- Seduction
- Showgirls
- Sinking Heart (2011) as Chris
- Speechless
- Spiritual Killer
- Sugar Town
- Swing of Emotion
- Tears in My Heart (2013) as Donny
- Temptation (2010)
- The Feast
- The Signature
- Torment My Soul
- Under
- Unfinished Game
- Un-Fokables
- War of Roses
- When You Love Someone
- Who Loves Me? (2010) as Rick
- Fragile (2022) as Kelly
- Silent Storm (2023)
- No, Not Me! (2024) as Gus
