= Majid Michel =

Ghanaian pastor and actor

- Michael at the 2014 Africa Magic Viewers Choice Awards
- Born: 22 September 1980 (age 46); Cantonments, Accra, Ghana
- Education: Mfantsipim School
- Occupations: Actor and pastor
- Years active: 2000–present
- Spouse: Virna Michel
- Children: 3
- Awards: Best Actor, Africa Movie Academy Awards 2012
- Website: majidmichel.com

Majid Michel (born 22 September 1980) is a Ghanaian actor, model, television personality, evangelist, and a humanitarian. He received nominations for Best Actor in a Leading Role at the Africa Movie Academy Awards in 2009, 2010, 2011, 2012, 2014 and 2017. He eventually won the award in 2012 after three previous consecutive nominations.

== Early life ==
Michel was born in Cantonments, a suburb of the Ghanaian capital Accra. The son of a Ghanaian-born father with Lebanese roots and a Ghanaian mother, he grew up in Accra with his nine siblings. He attended St. Theresa's Primary School, and later, the Mfantsipim School, the alma mater of actor and director Van Vicker and also of former United Nations Secretary-General Kofi Annan. In secondary school, Michel was actively involved in theatre and was a member of the school's Drama Club. As a member of the drama club, he received the Best Actor Award in one of their performances on Emancipation Day in Cape Coast, Ghana.

== Career ==
Before becoming a professional actor, Michel worked as a model. In a 2017 interview with Star FM Ghana, Majid shared that he didn't get the role for the first film he auditioned for due to his poor performance, but that his "passion for acting" propelled him to press forward in the film industry.

His first starring role was in the popular television serial drama, Things We Do for Love, in which he played the role of a young Lebanese working in a hotel.

He was cast in his first movie, Divine Love, as the male lead, alongside Jackie Aygemang with Van Vicker in a supporting role. Divine Love was a success, turning Majid Michel, Jackie Agyemang and Van Vicker into household names in Ghana.

In 2008, Michel starred in the lead role in the drama , Agony of the Christ, which received seven nominations at the Africa Movie Academy Awards in 2009, including for Michel as Best Actor.

In October 2017, Michel disclosed that he is paid at least $15,000 and had earned as much as $35,000 to star in a film. In October 2017, Michel, a born-again Christian, announced on a radio interview that due to his religious beliefs, he would no-longer take on roles that requires him to kiss on set.

=== Nollywood breakthrough and success ===
Michel is among the Ghanaian actors who entered the film industry during the period in which Nigerian director Frank Rajah Arase forged a partnership with Ghanaian director Abdul Salam Mumuni of Venus Films. The agreement introduced Ghanaian actors into mainstream Nollywood and provided some of them a level of star power comparable to Nigerian actors. Films produced under the agreement featuring Michel include: Crime to Christ (2007), Agony of Christ (2008), Heart of Men (2009), The Game (2010), and Who Loves Me? (2010) amongst others.

Michel made his Nollywood debut in the 2009 romantic drama, Emerald, playing a leading role alongside Genevieve Nnaji. While some critics commended Majid's performance and on-screen chemistry with Nnaji, the film received largely mixed to negative reviews. Silent Scandals (2009), on the other hand, received broadly positive critical reviews for its high production values and Michel's performance.

In 2009, Michel starred in the Nigerian drama, Guilty Pleasures, which was met with generally positive reviews, including for Michel's performance. In 2010 he starred for the third time alongside Genevieve Nnaji in Bursting Out, a Nollywood drama which generated mixed reviews. Of Nnaji, he was outspoken in his admiration saying that she taught him how to act. He also made headlines with an interview in which he said that Genevieve Nnaji was the best kisser in the film industry.

Michel frequently courted controversy early in his Nollywood career by his statements in the media, including the implication that Ghana had no film industry. In late 2010, it was reported that the actor was taking a break from working in Nollywood after receiving death threats, allegedly from Nigerian actors who thought that he was taking away too many role.

He returned to Ghana where he was featured in films such as 4 Play (2010) and its sequel 4 Play Reloaded (2011).

In 2012, he starred in the war film Somewhere in Africa, playing a tyrant. Though the film didn't do well critically, Michel received wide acclaim and won an Africa Movie Academy Award for the first time. His success in Somewhere in Africa revived his Nollywood career and in 2014, co-starred in the blockbuster 30 Days in Atlanta for which he got listed by the Nigerian Cinema Exhibition Coalition as one of the highest box office draws of 2014. Other 2014 films featuring Michel include: Forgetting June, which was met with generally negative reviews and Knocking on Heaven's Door and Being Mrs Elliot, both which were commercial and critical success.

== Filmography ==
- Things We Do For Love (2003-2016)
- Chelsea (2010) as Sylvester
- Agony of Christ (2008)
- Somewhere in Africa (2011) as General Mumbasa/Frank
- Shakira (2009) as Richie
- Make a Move (2009)
- Evil Doctor's Do
- The Game (2010) as Teddy Elbert
- Bursting Out (2010) as Tyrone
- 4 Play (2010) as Alvin
- 4 Play Reloaded (2010) as Alvin
- A Sting in a Tale (2009) as Nii Aryee
- Silent Scandals (2009) as Neto
- Passion of the Soul (2008) as Joe
- Crime to Christ (2005) as Sammy
- Royal Battle (2007)
- Divine Love (2004) as Maxwell Darkho
- Gangster
- Guilty Pleasure (2009)
- Tears of a Womanhood (2009) as Dennis
- St. Michael
- Shattered Mirror (2012) as Chinanza
- Save the Prince (2009) as Prince
- The Beast (2010) as Harry
- Royal Madness (2009) as Prince
- Her Excellency
- Reason to Kill (2011) as Benny
- Blood of Fire
- Final Crisis
- Captain
- Under the Sky
- The Three Widows
- Professional Lady
- House of Gold (2013) as Freddie Dan Ansah
- Nation Under Siege (2013)
- Forgetting June
- Matters Arising (2014)
- Knocking on Heaven's Door (2014)
- Being Mrs Elliot (2014)
- 30 Days in Atlanta (2014) as Lekki Gardens MD
- Brother's Keeper (2014)
- Champagne (2014)
- Road to Yesterday (2015) with Genevieve Nnaji and Deyemi Okanlawon
- Bishop Jerry (2015)
- Amuma (2015)
- The Department (2015)
- The Mad Man I Love (2015)
- Shattered Lives (2016)
- Yolo
- Deepest Cut (2018)
- Just a Night (2018)
- My Husband's Diary (2018)
- River Hotel (2019-2020)

== Personal life ==
Majid Michel is married and has three children. On 19 November 2015, he revealed that his wife of 10 years was responsible for his success. And he reverences only God before her. He renewed his marriage vows in the same year.

Majid is a born-again Christian. On 4 October 2016, he was a guest minister at a local church where he shared the word and performed deliverance on people. Speaking to Joy F.M in Ghana, Majid described his new spiritual life as "genuine and inspired from his understanding from the Bible". On 1 April 2017, he explained that his refined relationship with God has cost him some of his friends. He went further to state that his present friends are determined solely through a vision from God. In a 2017 sermon celebrating Easter, Majid summarised the whole essence of the cruxification of Christ as being to "overthrow racism, hate, envy, jealousy, pride, war, and demonic powers with a simple filled-grace life". In October 2017, Majid stated that he has been used by God to perform miracles on people. On masturbation, Majid described the act as a sin towards God. He went further to state that it was inevitable for one to engage in the act at least once in a lifetime. He also disclosed that he was once a victim in his younger years but encourages youths to desist from it. During a social media debate with Freeze, Majid disagreed with Freeze stance on tithing. Majid argued that tithing was not an old testament doctrine. Rather, he opined that tithe should be given to the church to help the poor.
