= List of Nigerian films of 2013 =

This is a list of Nigerian films released in 2013.

== Films ==
Title	Director	Cast	Genre	Notes
Forgetting June	Ikechukwu Onyeka	Majid Michel; Beverly Naya; Mbong Amata; Blossom Chuks Chukwujekwu	Romantic drama	
Broken	Bright Wonder Obasi	Nse Ikpe Etim; Bimbo Manuel; Kalu Ikeagwu	Drama	6 nominations at the 2013 Nollywood Movies Awards including awards for Best lead actor, Best Supporting actor, Best Supporting Actress, Best Cinematography, Best Make-up and Best Rising star Female
Murder at Prime Suites	Eneaji Chris Eneng	Joseph Benjamin; Chelsea Eze; Keira Hewatch; Okey Uzoeshi	Crime / thriller	Africa Magic Viewers Choice Awards nomination for Best Movie (drama) and Africa Movie Academy Awards nomination for Best Actor
Torn	Moses Inwang	Monalisa Chinda; Ireti Doyle; Joseph Benjamin; Tope Tedela; Julius Agwu	Psychological thriller	5 nominations at 2013 Best of Nollywood Awards
A Mile from Home	Eric Aghimien	Tope Tedela; Chiedozie 'Sambasa' Nzeribe; Alex Ayalogu	Romantic drama	2014 Africa Magic Viewers Choice Awards for Best Actor, Africa Movie Academy Award for Best Visual Effects and Africa Movie Academy Award for Most Promising Actor nomination
Awakening	James Omokwe; Ethan Okwara	OC Ukeje; Kehinde Bankole; Femi Brainard; Tope Tedela	Dark thriller	Africa Movie Academy Award for Best Visual Effects nomination
Half of a Yellow Sun	Biyi Bandele	Chiwetel Ejiofor; Thandie Newton; Genevieve Nnaji; Onyeka Onwenu; Anika Noni Rose	Historical drama	
Secret Room	Eneaji Chris Eneng	OC Ukeje; Jide Kosoko; Linda Ejiofor; Lilian Esoro	Thriller	
B for Boy	Chika Anadu	Uche Nwadili; Ngozi Nwaneto; Nonso Odogwu		
Accident	Teco Benson	Chioma Chukwuka; Kalu Ikeagwu; Frederick Leonard	Thriller	Africa Movie Academy Award for Best Nigerian Film
Gold Diggin	Rukky Sanda	Yvonne Nelson; Rukky Sanda; Alex Ekubo	Drama	
Lagos Cougars	Desmond Elliot	Monalisa Chinda; Uche Jombo; Daniella Okeke; Alex Ekubo	Romantic drama	nominated 10th Africa Movie Academy Awards
House of Gold	Pascal Amanfo	Majid Michel; Yvonne Nelson; Omawumi; Ice Prince	Romantic drama	8 nominations at the 2013 Golden Icons Academy Movie Awards
Flower Girl	Michelle Bello	Damilola Adegbite; Chris Attoh; Chuks Chukwujekwu; Eku Edewor	Romantic comedy	1 nomination at the 9th Africa Movie Academy Awards
Finding Mercy	Desmond Elliot	Rita Dominic; Uti Nwachukwu; Chioma Chukwuka; Tamara Eteimo	Drama	
Alan Poza	Charles Novia	OC Ukeje; Beverly Naya; Okey Uzoeshi; Belinda Effah; Sylvia Oluchi	Romantic comedy	2 nominations at the 9th Africa Movie Academy Awards
Confusion Na Wa	Kenneth Gyang	Ramsey Nouah; OC Ukeje; Ali Nuhu	Dark comedy	2 awards at the 9th Africa Movie Academy Awards
Doctor Bello	Tony Abulu	Isaiah Washington; Vivica A. Fox; Genevieve Nnaji; Justus Esiri	Adventure	
One Night in Vegas	John Uche	Jimmy Jean-Louis; John Dumelo; Yvonne Nelson; Sarodj Bertin; Van Vicker; Michael Blackson	Comedy drama	
Kamara's Tree	Desmond Elliot	Desmond Elliot; Lydia Forson; Ivie Okujaye; Tessy Abubakar; Bobby Obodo; Ginnefine Kanu; Morris K Sesay	Comedy drama	

== See also ==
- List of Nigerian films
