= 2013 Golden Icons Academy Movie Awards =

2nd Golden Icons Academy Awards
- Date: 19 October 2013
- Hosted by: Ramsey Nouah
- Organized by: Golden Icons Magazine

The 2013 Golden Icons Academy Movie Awards was the second edition of the ceremony to reward excellence in African cinema. It was hosted by Ramsey Nouah.

== Awards ==
=== Categories ===
Best Motion Picture

- Brother's Keeper (2014 film)
- Finding Mercy (film)
- Torn (2013 Nigerian film)
- Contract (2012 film)
- Ninah’s Dowry
- Phone Swap

Best Drama

- Hunters
- On Bended knees
- House of Gold
- Desperate Housegirls
- Finding Mercy
- Torn (2013 Nigerian film)

Best Cinematography

- Red Hot
- Last Flight to Abuja
- Weekend Getaway
- Phone Swap
- Brother's Keeper (2014 film)
- Contract (2012 film)

Best Comedy

- Okon goes to School
- Cheaters
- Mrs Somebody
- Lies men Tell
- Phone Swap
- House of Gold

Best Costume

- The Twin Sword
- Weekend Getaway
- House of Gold
- Volunteers
- The Gods are Still not to Blame
- Keeping my Man

Most Promising Actress (Best New Actress)

- Mary Lazarus – Desperate House girls
- Omawumi Megbele – House of Gold
- Mbufung Seikeh – Ninah’s dowry
- Okawa Shaznay – Cheaters
- Tamara Eteimo – Desperate House Girls
- Itz Tiffany – Single and Married

Best Actress

- Ireti Doyle – Torn (2013 Nigerian film)
- Rita Dominic – Finding Mercy (film)
- Jackie Appiah – Hunters
- Omoni Oboli – Brother's Keeper (2014 film)
- Chioma Chukwuka – On Bended Knees
- Yvonne Okoro – Contract (2012 film)
- Nse Ikpe Etim – Phone Swap

Best Supporting Actress

- Monalisa Chinda Torn (2013 Nigerian film)
- Uru Ekeh – Weekend Getaway
- Keira Hewatch Lies men Tell
- Roselyn Ngissah – Letter to my Mother
- Betty Olumowe – Scam
- Kate Henshaw-Nuttal – False

Most Promising Actor (Best New Actor)

- Bobby Obodo – The Volunteers
- Anurin Nwunembom – Ninah’s Dowry
- Wale Ojo – Phone Swap
- Umar Krupp – House of Gold
- Blossom Chukwujekwu – Finding Mercy (film)
- Seun Akindele – On Bended Knees

Best Actor

- Kalu Ikeagwu – False
- Adjetey Anang – Hunters
- Hlomla Dandala – Contract (2012 film)
- Majid Michel – Brother's Keeper (2014 film)
- OC Ukeje – Alan Poza
- Yemi Blaq – Bridge of Hope

Best Supporting Actor

- Joseph Benjamin (actor) – Torn (2013 Nigerian film)
- Eddie Watson – Letter to my Mother
- Alex Ekubo – Weekend Getaway
- Francis Odega – House of Gold
- Chet Anekwe – On Bended Knees
- Uti Nwachukwu – Finding Mercy (film)

Best Director

- Moses Inwang – Torn (2013 Nigerian film)
- Kunle Afolayan – Phone Swap
- Ikechukwu Onyeka – Brother's Keeper (2014 film)
- Desmond Elliott – Finding Mercy (film)
- Victor Viyuoh – Ninah’s Dowry
- Pascal Amanfo – House of Gold

Best Original Screenplay

- Phone Swap - Kemi Adesoye
- Torn (2013 Nigerian film)
- Finding Mercy (film)
- Desperate Housegirls
- House of Gold
- False

Best Sound

- Last Flight to Abuja
- Red Hot
- Finding Mercy (film)
- Contract (2012 film)
- Hunters
- Mrs. Somebody

Producer of the Year

- Moses Inwang – Torn (2013 Nigerian film)
- Che Hilaire – Ninah’s Dowry
- Abdul Salam – Hunters
- Kunle Afolayan – Phone Swap
- Uduak Isong – Desperate Housegirls
- Yvonne Okoro – Contract (2012 film)

Best Original Soundtrack

- Hunters
- Mrs Somebody
- Ninah’s Dowry
- Weekend Getaway
- Bridge of Hope
- Cheaters

Best Film Diaspora

- Still Standing [USA]
- Feathered Dreams [Ukraine]
- Unguarded [USA]
- When One door Closes [USA]

Best Film Director – Diaspora

- Andrew Rozhen – Feathered Dreams
- Desmond Elliot & Bethels Agomuoh – Unguarded
- Michael Uadiale – Still Standing
- Robert Peters – When one door loses

Best Actor - Viewer's Choice

- Mike Ezuruonye

Best Actress - Viewer's Choice

- Ini Edo

=== Honorary Awards ===
Honorary Lifetime Achievement Award

- Richard Mofe Damijo

Honorary Directing Achievement Award

- Lancelot Oduwa Imasuen
