= House of Gold (film) =

2013 Ghanaian/Nigerian comedy film

- Theatrical release poster
- Directed by: Pascal Amanfo
- Written by: Pascal Amanfo
- Produced by: Yvonne Nelson
- Starring: Majid Michel; Yvonne Nelson; Omawumi Megbele; Mercy Chinwo; Ice Prince Zamani; Francis Odega
- Cinematography: Valee Dakup
- Edited by: Okey Benson
- Music by: Bernie Anti
- Production companies: Media GH; YN Productions; Pascal Amanfo Expression
- Distributed by: Silverbird Distributions Limited (theatrical); Henrikesim Multimedia (home media)
- Release dates: 12 April 2013 (Ghana); 19 July 2013 (Nigeria)
- Running time: 118 minutes
- Countries: Ghana; Nigeria
- Languages: English; French
- Box office: ₦15,454,401 (Nigerian domestic gross)

House of Gold (released as Family Runs on DVD) is a 2013 Ghanaian-Nigerian comedy film, produced by Yvonne Nelson and directed by Pascal Amanfo. It stars Majid Michel, Yvonne Nelson, Omawumi Megbele, Mercy Chinwo, Ice Prince Zamani, Eddie Watson and Francis Odega.

The film narrates the story of a business mogul and a socialite, Dan Ansah Williams who is dying of cancer and has been told that he has six weeks left to live. He makes a decision with the help of his attorney to call all his children back home, most of whom were born out of wedlock and various illicit affairs. The re-union spins a lot of surprises as each child returns with an agenda, which gives hilarious results.

It was released on 12 April 2013 in Ghana and on 19 July 2013 in Nigeria. Though the film was met with generally negative critical reviews, it received nominations at the 2013 Golden Icons Academy Movie Awards, 2013 Ghana Movie Awards, 2014 Africa Magic Viewers Choice Awards and 2013 Zulu African Film Academy Awards. It won six awards at the latter, including categories: "Best Picture", "Best Director", "Best Supporting Actor", "Best Supporting Actress" and "Best Cinematography".

== Cast ==
- Majid Michel as Freddie Dan Ansah
- Yvonne Nelson as Timara Dan Ansah
- Omawumi Megbele as Nina Dan Ansah
- Umar Krupp as Peter Dan Ansah
- Eddie Watson as Sam
- Francis Odega as John Bosco
- Luckie Lawson as Mitchel Dan Ansah
- Amanorbea Dodoo as Barrister Paula
- Mercy Chinwo as Lucia
- Ice Prince Zamani as Tony
- Dream Debo as Judas
- Marlon Mave as Jamal Dan Ansah
- Emefal Atse as Jasmine
- Pascal Amanfo as Clifford Dan Ansah

== Release ==
A promotional trailer of House of Gold was released on YouTube on 4 March 2013. The film was premiered in Ghana on 12 April 2013 and in Nigeria on 19 July 2013, before going on a general theatrical release in Nigeria. It was released on DVD with the title Family Runs in November 2013 by Henrikesim Multimedia Concept.

== Reception ==
=== Box office ===
House of Gold grossed a total of ₦15,454,401 in Nigerian cinemas, peaking at number 3 on the Box Office chart, at the time of its release, .

=== Critical reception ===
The film was generally met with negative reviews. Nollywood Reinvented rated the film 28%, stating that the narrative "takes some getting used to" and concluded: "House of Gold is 'nothing spectacular', but it is 'nothing spectacular' dressed in pretty clothes and filled with many comic moments". Sodas and Popcorn comments: "House of Gold began with great potential but somehow ended up going last-flight-to-abuja on us all and just crashes shortly after takeoff". It gave the film 2 out of 5 and concluded by stating, "addicts would have had a great time watching this movie, which admittedly was indeed funny; but then, it is what it is: a badly written funny movie. If you are a big fan of a good movie and you were attracted to this movie by the awesome title and lovely poster, then move along. Nothing here for you". Wilfred Okiche of YNaija panned the film, stating that "the plot is repetitive, scripting is wishy washy, characters come and go in a disastrous blur and nothing here is particularly memorable, not even in a bad way". He however commended Francis Odega's performance, but concluded that "Yvonne Nelson and Majid Michel cannot save this House of Gold from sinking". Ameyaw Debrah of Africa Magic gave a mixed review, describing the film as having "a lot of good laugh-out-loud moments which make up for the not too impressive acting and fickle storyline. Not a collector's item but a good movie to see with the family or with friends". Efe Doghudje of 360Nobs gave 3.5 out of 10 stars, noting that "Family Runs [House of Gold] was a miscue in terms of production quality, post-production and scripting, which is very unlike the team that put Single and Married together". Ada Arinze of Connect Nigeria remarked that "the movie starts out well, with lots of laughs, but spirals down into a boring and predictable ending".

=== Accolades ===
The film received eight nominations at the 2013 Golden Icons Academy Movie Awards, eleven at the 2013 Ghana Movie Awards, a nomination at the 2014 Africa Magic Viewers Choice Awards and another eleven nominations at the 2013 Zulu African Film Academy Awards. It won six awards at the latter, including categories: "Best Picture", "Best Director", "Best Supporting Actor" for Francis Odega, "Best Supporting Actress" for Omawumi Megbele, "Best Use of Costume" and "Best Cinematography".

Complete list of Awards
Award	Category	Recipients and nominees	Result
2013 Golden Icons Academy Movie Awards	Best Director	Pascal Amanfo	Nominated
2013 Golden Icons Academy Movie Awards	Best Drama	Pascal Amanfo	Nominated
2013 Golden Icons Academy Movie Awards	Best Comedy	Pascal Amanfo	Nominated
2013 Golden Icons Academy Movie Awards	Best Costume		Nominated
2013 Golden Icons Academy Movie Awards	Most Promising Actress (Best New Actress)	Omawumi Megbele	Nominated
2013 Golden Icons Academy Movie Awards	Most Promising Actor (Best New Actor)	Umar Krupp	Nominated
2013 Golden Icons Academy Movie Awards	Best Supporting Actor	Francis Odega	Nominated
2013 Golden Icons Academy Movie Awards	Best Original Screenplay	Pascal Amanfo	Nominated
2013 Ghana Movie Awards	Best Picture	Pascal Amanfo	Nominated
2013 Ghana Movie Awards	Best Writing (Adapted or Original Screenplay)	Pascal Amanfo	Nominated
2013 Ghana Movie Awards	Best Original Score	Berni Anti	Nominated
2013 Ghana Movie Awards	Best Production Design		Nominated
2013 Ghana Movie Awards	Best Editing	Okey Benson	Nominated
2013 Ghana Movie Awards	Best Music (Original Song)	Berni Anti, Mercy Chinwo	Nominated
2013 Ghana Movie Awards	Best Makeup and Hair Stylist	Joyce Mensah	Nominated
2013 Ghana Movie Awards	Best African Collaboration - Best Actor	Francis Odega	Nominated
2013 Ghana Movie Awards	Best African Collaboration - Best Actress	Omawumi Megbele	Nominated
2013 Ghana Movie Awards	Best Sound Mixing and Editing	Berni Anti	Nominated
2013 Ghana Movie Awards	Best Actor in a Supporting Role	Henry Adofo Asiedu	Nominated
2014 Africa Magic Viewers Choice Awards	Best Actor in a Drama	Majid Michel	Nominated
2013 Zulu African Film Academy Awards	Best Picture	Pascal Amanfo	Won
2013 Zulu African Film Academy Awards	Best Director	Pascal Amanfo	Won
2013 Zulu African Film Academy Awards	Best Actress	Yvonne Nelson	Nominated
2013 Zulu African Film Academy Awards	Best Supporting Actor	Francis Odega	Won
2013 Zulu African Film Academy Awards	Best Supporting Actress	Omawumi Megbele	Won
2013 Zulu African Film Academy Awards	Best Newcomer	Henry Ado Asiedu, Mercy Chiwo	Nominated
2013 Zulu African Film Academy Awards	Best Child Performance	Lisa Asor Awuku	Nominated
2013 Zulu African Film Academy Awards	Best Use of Costume		Won
2013 Zulu African Film Academy Awards	Best Screenplay	Pascal Amanfo	Nominated
2013 Zulu African Film Academy Awards	Best Cinematography		Won
2013 Zulu African Film Academy Awards	Best Sound		Nominated

== See also ==
- List of Nigerian films of 2013
