= 2013 Best of Nollywood Awards =

Annual film award

5th Best of Nollywood Awards
- Date: 8 December 2013
- Site: Dome, Asaba, Delta, Nigeria
- Organized by: Best of Nollywood Magazine

The 5th Best of Nollywood Awards was held at Dome, Asaba, Delta State on 5 December 2013. Several notable personalities like Juliet Ibrahim, Omoni Oboli and Richard Mofe Damijo were in attendance. The Dark Comedy film Confusion Na Wa won the category Movie of the Year.

| Best Lead Actor in an English Movie | Best Lead Actress in an English Movie |
|---|---|
| OC Ukeje (Alan Poza); Blossom Chukwujekwu (Finding Mercy); Seun Akindele (Bended Knees); Bayo Alawiye (Dark Secret); Funso Adeolu (Cobweb) | Omoni Oboli (Brother's Keeper); Iretiola Doyle (Torn); Chioma Akpotha (On Bended Knees); Uche Jombo (Mrs Somebody); Queen Nwokoye (Egwonga) |
| Best Lead Actor in a Yoruba film | Best Lead Actress in a Yoruba film |
| Mike Ezuruonye(Unforgivable); Odunlade Adekola(Mufu Olosa Oko); Richard Aigbor (Ifa Iwa); Muyiwa Ademola (Aja); Femi Adebayo (Alade Owala) | Joke Muyiwa (Ayitale); Dayo Amusa (Unforgivable); Khabirat Kafidipe (The Seed); Toyin Aimakhu (Alani Baba Labake); Mercy Aigbe (Komfo) |
| Best Supporting Actor in an English film | Best Supporting Actress in an English film |
| Alex Ekubo (Weekend Getaway); Joseph Benjamin (Darkside); Ime Bishop (In a Wish); Chet Anekwe (Bended Knees) | Rita Dominic (Finding Mercy); Kate Obiang (Journey to Self); Helen Paul (In a Wish); Oge Okoye (Turning Point); Akio Precious (Job Seekers) |
| Best Supporting Actor in a Yoruba film | Best Supporting Actress in a Yoruba film |
| Odunlade Adekola (Aja); Ibrahim Chatta (Ifa Iwa); Bayo Alawiye (Ebi mi ni); Femi Adebayo (Irugbin); Yinka Quadri (Ilari) | Fathia Balogun (Irugbin); Bidemi Kosoko (Ifa Iwa); Toyin Aimakhu (Ebimi ni); Yewande Adekoya (Kudeti); Ronke Odusanya (Ere Ayo mi) |
| Most Promising Act of the Year (male) | Most Promising Act of the Year (female) |
| Kola Ajeyemi (Were Meta); Kas Jonathan (Twin Sword); Abdul Lateef Titilope (Ifa Iwa); Luclay Misoya (The Cartel); Igoni Archibong (Turning Point) | Sylvia Oluchi (Bended Knees); Funmi Beka (Ebi mi ni); Bidemi Mustapha (Aja); Anu Sosanya (Edidi); Funke Alegbeleye (Alade Owala) |
| Best Child Actor (male) | Best Child Actor (female) |
| Asimiyu Uthman Omokunmi (Ifa Iwa); Olamide David (Cobweb); Dozie Onyiriuka (Journey to Self) | Oyindamola Lanpejo (Finding Mercy); Titilayo Shobo (Unforgivable) |
| Comedy of the Year | Movie with the Best Social Message |
| Nanny; Okon goes to School; Oba Omo; A Wish | Journey to Self; A Wish; Confusion Na Wa; Opo; Unforgivable |
| Best Kiss in a Movie | Best Makeup in a Movie |
| Ibironke Ashaolu and Wale Akanbi (Unforgivable); Beverly Naya and Bobby Obodo (Weekend Getaway); Rita Dominic and Blossom Chukwuzkwu (Finding Mercy); IK Ogbonna and Martha Ankomah (Playing Safe) | Unforgivable; Ifa Iwa; Ayitale; Order of the Ring; Alani Owala |
| Onga Best Use of Nigerian Food in a Movie | Best Short film of the Year |
| In her Shoes; Ifa Iwa; On Bended Knees; Unforgivable | Epitaph; Rom 106; Sarahology |
| Best Use of a Costume in a Movie | Best Screenplay |
| Twin Sword; Ifa Iwa; Ilari; King after King; Order of the Ring | Confusion Na Wa; Torn; Ilari; Cobweb; Ayitale |
| Best Edited Movie | Best Sound in a Movie |
| Torn; Unforgivable; Confusion Na Wa; Cobweb; The Gods are still not to blame | Cobweb; Ifa Iwa; Irawe; The Gods are still not to Blame; Turning Point |
| Best Production Design | Best Cinematography |
| Confusion Na Wa; Cobweb; The Gods are still not to Blame; Ifa Iwa | Cobweb; Unforgiveable; Confusion Na wa; Ayitale; Alade Owala |
| Director of the Year | Movie of the Year |
| Kenneth Gyang (Confusion Na Wa); Adebayo Salami (Ayitale); Moses Inwang (Torn); Toba Macbaror (Cobweb); Desmond Elliot (Unforgivable) | Confusion Na wa; Ayitale; Torn; Cobweb; Unforgivable |
| Best Special Effects | Best Actor (Hausa) |
| Judgment Night; Twin Sword; Mufu Olosa Oko | Ali Nuhu (Wani Hanin); Zaharadeen Sani (Halayen); As Mati in (Wani Gari); Adam A. Zango (Martani) |
| Best Actress (Hausa) | Best Supporting Actor (Hausa) |
| Hafisat Maryam Booth (Buduwar); Nafisat Abdullahi (Son Zuciya); As Lumi (bakim Alkala); Hadiza Aliyu (Babban Zaure) | Adam A. Zango (Buduwar); Ibrahim Nuhu (Raciyin Zuci); Sani Musa Danjo; Sadisu Abba (Halayen) |
| Best Supporting Actress (Hausa) | Revelation of the Year (Female) |
| Fatima Ladan (Abokina); As aunt Salma (Bakin Alkala); Ummi Moh’d (Halayen); Ladidi Fagge (Son Zuciya) | Laitan Ogungbeile; Tamara Eteimo; Tope Oshoba; Uche Benjamin; Chinwe Isaac; Mimi Orijekwe |
| Revelation of the Year (male) | Movie Journalist of the Year |
| Charles Billion Pius; Igoni Archibong; Luclay Misoya; Daniel K Daniel; Walter Anga; Michael Godson | Hafeez Balogun (Daily Independent); Ben Njoku (Vanguard (Nigeria)|Vanguard); Wemimo Ogunde (Nollywood Mindspace); Biodun Kupoluyi (E24/7) |
Marketer of the Year
| Divine Touch; Alhaji Abudullah Rasak (Corporate Pictures); Alhaji Kazeem Afolayan; Magic Movies; Royal academy; Akagod Production | |
