= Kweku Elliott =

Ghanaian-born Trinidadian actor

- Pronunciation: "Kway- Ku"
- Born: May 2, 1980 (age 46)
- Education: Arts Institute at Bournemouth
- Occupation: Actor
- Years active: 2011– present
- Height: 6"3

Kweku Elliott (born 1980) is a Ghanaian actor of Ghanaian and Trinidadian descent, who is also known as "Kay Elliott". His 2012 major debut role was in Single and Married directed by Pascal Amanfo and produced by Yvonne Nelson. He currently stars in Deloris Frimpong Manso's new series Coco Brown. He is said to be "The next big thing to happen to Ghana's movie industry."

== Early life ==
Born to a Ghanaian father and Trinidadian mother, Kweku Elliot is of mixed heritage. His father Kojo Elliot was a lawyer, and his mother Henrietta Elliot, a school teacher. Elliot was born in Takoradi, Ghana's Western Region. His family moved to Accra when he was five years old, a year later his father Kojo Elliot died. He attended SOS Herman Gmeiner International School with his elder sister Essie, the same school in which his mother had also taught. During his high school years he attended Akosombo International School, and later switched to Mfantsipim School. In his late teens Elliot moved to the United Kingdom and attended Arts University Bournemouth. He has stated in interviews that during his stay in the UK, he worked as a model, and did the odd job here and there in order to make ends meet.

== Career ==
Elliott left the UK in 2006 and returned home to Ghana and successfully opened up his own graphic design firm, Media-K Solutions, a boutique desktop publishing company. His vibrant, outgoing, and charming personality led many friends and family members to push him away from the IT world and into showbiz. He landed his first paid gig in 2011 shooting a popular commercial for Vodafone Ghana that aired throughout the nation during its national brand campaign for "Power to you". He has stated that before landing his first cinematic role, he applied for Big Brother Africa but was not chosen to go through for the next round of auditions. He then debuted in Yvonne Nelsons Single and Married, as Raymond, Nadia Buari's unsatisfied, cheating husband. His role in Single and Married propelled his career landing him more roles with prominent Nollywood artistes such as Nse Ikpe Etim in Purple Rose. Rukky Sanda in If you were mine, and Uti Nwachukwu in Devil In a Dress all filmed within 2013 a year after his first on-screen appearance. In 2015, Elliott played lead role in Yvonne Nelsons acclaimed movie If Tomorrow Never Comes, in which he plays an Atheist journalist, a role in which he has described as "very challenging" in reference to portraying a cold and heartless mannered character. Elliott was nominated twice in 2015 for the City People Entertainment Awards for Best Supporting Actor of The Year and The Golden Movie Awards Ghana for Golden Supporting Actor in Zynnell Zuh’s Love Regardless. In 2016, he played lead role in Eddie Nartey's film In April which premiered at the Silverbird Cinemas in Accra on September 3, 2016. He currently stars in the ongoing TV series Coco Brown.

== Filmography ==
- Vodafone – "The chase" (2011)
- HFC Bank – "Dreams" (2011)
- My Home (2012)
- Single and Married (2012) as Raymond
- Devil In a Dress (2013)
- If You Were Mine (2013)
- Purple Rose (2013) as Ethan
- Tenants (2013)
- V-Republic (2014) as Frank
- Heartbreak Hotel (2014)
- An African City (2014)
- Love Regardless (2014)
- Cheaters Vacation 1&2 (2014)
- If Tomorrow Never Comes (2015)
- Coco Brown (2016) as Christian
- In April (2016) as Nii
- Treachery (2017) as Taxi Driver
- Sometimes in Yesterday (2018) as Kelly
- Sin City (2019) as Klem
