= Tamara Eteimo =

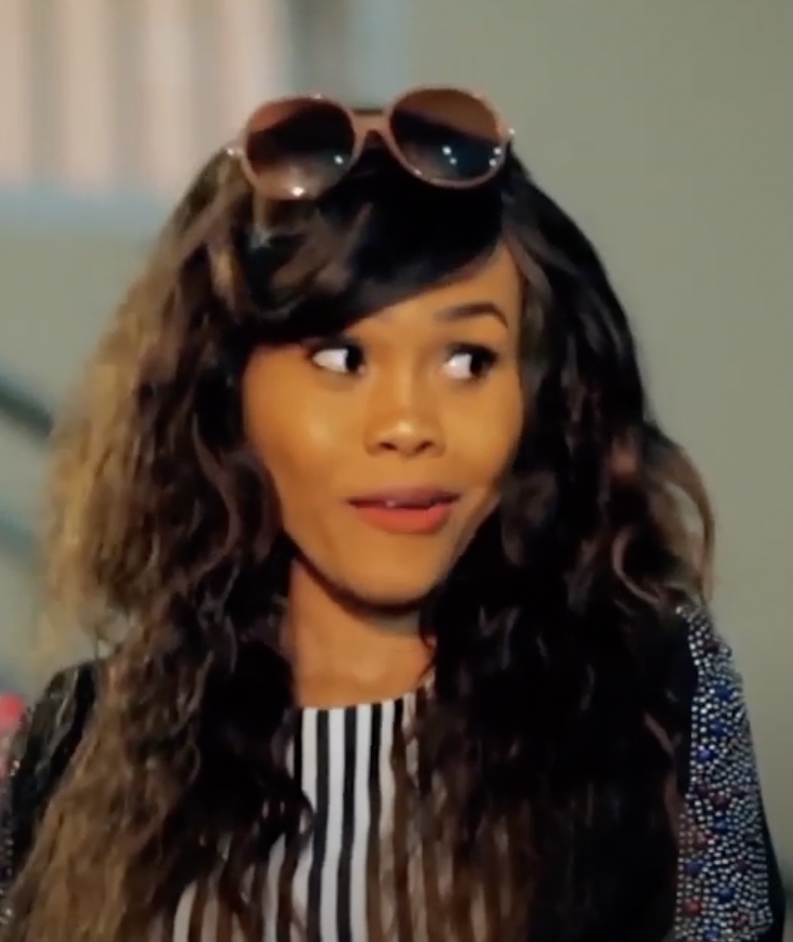
- Born: Tamarabrakemi Eteimo; July 24, 1987 (age 39)
- Citizenship: Nigerian
- Education: University of Port Harcourt
- Occupations: Actress, singer
- Years active: 2009–present
- Musical career
- Genre: R&B

Tamara Eteimo (born July 24, 1987) also known by her stage name Tamara Jones, is a Nigerian R&B singer-songwriter and actor. Since her Nollywood film debut in 2011, right after she won the seventh edition of the Next Movie Star reality show, the actress has appeared in over 50 films. She was ranked second in Charles Novia's annual rankings of Nollywood actresses for 2013 and has been nominated for numerous awards. Eteimo completed her primary and secondary school education in Port Harcourt before enrolling at the University of Port Harcourt to study Theatre Arts. As of May 2010, she had released singles "Vibrate" and "Na Only you" from her debut studio album. She won the 2013 Next Movie Star winner and she claims to be eyeing the oscar award.

== Early Life & Education ==
Tamara Eteimo (born July 24, 1987), also known by her stage name Tamara Jones, is a Nigerian R&B singer-songwriter and actress.

Eteimo completed her primary and secondary education in Port Harcourt, Rivers State, before proceeding to the University of Port Harcourt to study Theatre Arts.

== Career ==
In an interview with The Punch, Eteimo stated that despite the challenges of maintaining consistency in Nollywood, she considers acting her primary passion and could not quit the profession.

== Filmography ==
Year	Film	Role	Notes
2012	Survival		Best of Nollywood Awards (BON)
2012	Dormitory 8		
2013	Mrs Somebody		
2013	Finding Mercy		with Rita Dominic, Blossom Chukwujekwu, Uti Nwachukwu and Chioma Chukwuka
2013	Desperate Housegirls		with Ini Edo, Desmond Elliot, Kenneth Okolie, Mary Lazarus
2013	Somewhere Down The Line	Lead	with Rachael Oniga, Bukky Wright, Yemi Blaq
2013	Dry-Next Page		
2013	Meet the Neighbours		
2014	Falling		with Desmond Elliot, Blossom Chukwujekwu, Adesua Etomi
2014	Cobweb		with Uti Nwachukwu, Funsho Adeolu, Mary Lazarus
2014	A Long Night		
2014	The Scorned Help		
2014	Cheating Experience		
2014	Kopa		
2014	Red Lights Off		
2014	Green Eyed		
2014	Oyoma		Nollywood Reloaded
2014	Unblissful		Nollywood Reloaded
2014	Dry	Nurse Ramatu	with Stephanie Okereke, Liz Benson, William McNamara, Darwin Shaw and Paul Sambo
2014	Mama Bomboy		
2014	Emerald		
2015	Dear Diary		
2015	The Other Side		
2015	The Green Eyed		
2015	A Long Night	Blessing	
2015	Falling	Tina	
2016	Virgin Bride		
2016	It's About Your Husband	Bunmi	
2016	The Good Samaritan		with Wale Ojo and Empress Njamah
2016	Gone Grey		with Funsho Adeolu, Stan Nze, Judith Audu, Seyi Hunter and Angel Vara Iduhe
2016	Fast Cash	Selena	with Mary Lazarus, Kiki Omeili, Oma Nnadi, Funny Bone and Klint da Drunk
2016	Class Of 21		
2016	Hotel Choco		with Femi Branch, Sambasa Nzeribe and Jennifer Igbinovia
2016	Time To HeaL		
2016	Candle		
2016	The Guilt		
2016	Scratched		
2016	Death Trap		
2016	Blind Spot		
2016	The X-List		
2016	One Monday Morning		
2016	Lost in Lust		
2016	A Walk in the Dark		
2016	Brown Envelope		
2016	Next Door		
2017	The Three Tramps and The Law		
2017	33hours		
2017	My Game		
2017	Black Men Rock		
2017	Fair Lady		
2017	Family		
	This Life		
	Itohan		Super Story
	Macbeth		
	Closed Doors		
	Pepper soup		
	Calabar woman		
2017	A Time to Heal	Sade	
2018	Thick Skinned	Saifa	
2019	Drowning	Sheila	
2021	Candle	Jessica	
2022	Judas	Helen	
2023	Face to Face	Jasmine	

== Awards and nominations ==
Year	Nominee	Award	Result	Ref
2009	University of Port Harcourt (Theater Arts C.R.A.B)	Best Acting Student	Won	
2011	New York Film Academy/ Delyork	Best Acting Student	Won	
	Next Movie Star Reality Show	Winner Next Movie Star Reality Show	Won	
2014	Africa Magic Viewers Choice Awards (Desperate Housegirls)	Best Supporting actress	Nominated	
	GIAMA Houston (Desperate Housegirls)	Best Supporting actress	Nominated	
	BON 2014 (Somewhere Down the line)	Best Actress	Nominated	
	NEA 2014 (Desperate Housegirls)	Best Supporting Actress	Nominated	
2017	Acia Awards Atlanta (Falling)	Best Supporting Actress	Won	
2019	Best of Nollywood Awards	Best Actress in a Lead role – English	Won	
2021	Net Honours	Most Searched Actress	Nominated	

== See also ==
- List of people from Port Harcourt
- List of Nigerian musicians
- List of Nigerian actresses
