= Celebrity Marriage (film) =

- Directed by: Pascal Amanfo
- Produced by: Uchenna Mbunabo
- Release date: 17 November 2017 (Nigeria)
- Country: Nigeria
- Language: English

Celebrity Marriage is a romantic Nigerian film all about love, relationship and romance. It was directed by Pascal Amanfo and produced by Uchenna Mbunabo. It was released on November 17, 2017.

== Plot ==
Rita, an actress, is in an abusive marriage with Farouq. She confides in her celebrity friends who also share problems similar to hers while struggling with her career in the movie industry.

== Cast ==
- Toyin Abraham as Rita
- Odunlade Adekola as farouq
- Jackia Appiah as Victoria
- Charity Awoke as Nkechi
- Frances Ben as Ify
- Tonto Dikeh as Stephanie
- Anthony Edet as Jude
- Osita Iheme as Lakeside
- Kanayo O. Kanayo as Mr Gabriel
- Igho Leonard as Doctor
- Sonny McDon as Lawyer
- Roselyn Ngissah as Any
- Chioma Nwosu as Felicia
- Frances odega as Emeka
- Onwualu Odmake as Bridesmaid
- Jimmy Odukoya as Lotama
- Calista Okoronkwo as Julist

== See also ==
- List of Nigerian actors
- Shola Arikusa
- Black Rose (2018 film)
