= Omawumi =

Nigerian musician and actress (born 1982)

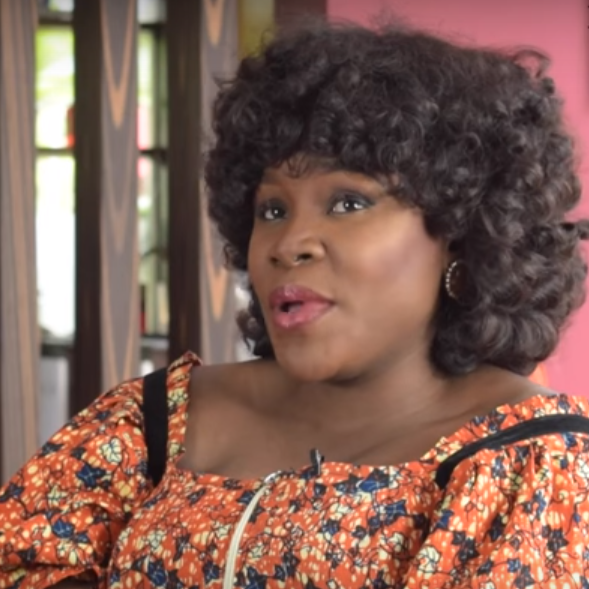
- Omawumi Megbele during an interview in 2016

Background information
- Also known as: Omawumi
- Born: Omawumi Boma Megbele; 13 April 1982 (age 44); Delta State, Nigeria
- Origin: Warri, Delta State
- Genres: Soul music, R&B, pop, afropop
- Occupations: Singer, songwriter, actress
- Years active: 2007–present
- Label: Oma Records
- Spouse: Oluwatosin Yussuf (m. 2015)

Omawumi Boma Megbele-Yussuf (born 13 April 1982), known mononymously by Omawumi, is a Nigerian singer-songwriter and actress of Itsekiri ethnicity. She was the brand ambassador for Globacom, Konga.com, and Malta Guinness. She's also part of the campaign called "Rise with the Energy of Africa". She gained attention as the 2007 runner-up on West African Idols, a reality TV show part of the Idols franchise. Her second album, Lasso of Truth (2013), was reported to be a commercial success in Nigeria.

== Early life and education ==
Omawumi was born on 13 April 1982 to Chief Dr. Frank and Mrs. Aya Megbele. She began her education at Nana Primary School during her pupilage, and later attended the College of Education Demonstration Secondary School. She graduated from Ambrose Alli University with a law degree. After graduating in 2005, she moved to Port Harcourt, Rivers State, where she worked with her family's law firm called "O.S Megbele & Associates". She also studied French at Alliance Francaise.

== Career ==
Omawumi rose to prominence as a contestant on Idols West Africa. Omawumi was voted the 1st runner-up of the competition when it ended in May 2007. Since then, she has had numerous performances on the stage with musicians such as P-Square, 2face Idibia, Phyno, D'Banj, Banky W, M.I, Sasha, 9ice, Chaka Demus and Pliers, Carl Thomas, Angie Stone and Donell Jones, Angélique Kidjo, among others. In September 2008, Omawumi released her debut single "In The Music". Her debut album Wonderwoman was released on 11 November 2009. The album The Lasso of Truth was released on 10 April 2013.

She released an EP, In Her Feelings, on 14 June 2019, which comprises Afro-fusion, Jazz, and R&B. In Her Feelings embodies tracks from multiple genres including "For My Baby", "Mr. Sinnerman", "Away", "True Loving", "Tabansi" and "Green Grass".

Her single "Lituation" was released on 22 May 2020. She dropped her fourth studio album, Love Deep High Life (LDHL) containing features from Phyno, Waje, Brymo, and Ric Hassani.

=== Acting career ===
Even before Omawumi made her official debut in the world of make-believe, she has always incorporated the element of visual demonstration and dramatic elements into her music videos which in turn, deemed her worthy of being a thespian and the movie roles that came her way. She kick-started with a role on stage in the 2009 edition of the V-Monologues, a literary work geared toward portraying the plights and struggles of women in Nigeria. She subsequently went on to score a role in Olurumbi, a Yoruba indigenous folktale and musical. She made her screen debut in 2010 with the high budget AMAA award-winning film, Inale. A Nigerian musical drama hosting an array of actors within Nollywood and Hollywood. She made her second appearance alongside Ice Prince, in the Ghanaian movie titled House of Gold produced by Yvonne Nelson and directed by Pascal Amanfo in 2013. In 2019, she leaped to venture into movie production as she joined forces with Waje to collaborate on a film project as co-producers. The movie titled She Is directed by Eneng Enaji is an extension or replica of her humanitarian works and the values she has upheld and consistently communicated in her work of art. She Is takes a ride through the societal standards, expectations and, restrictions faced by a successful Nigerian woman. The film is a presentational art that paints a picture of society and raises questions, sparking debates on possible solutions. She starred in the film alongside her co-producer.

== Personal life ==
Omawumi married Tosin Yusuf on 13 January 2015. She is the event convener at GLG Communications.

== Discography ==
Studio albums

- Wonder Woman (2009)
- Lasso of Truth (2013)
- Timeless (2017)
- Love Deep High Life (LDHL) (2021)

EPs

- In Her Feelings (2019)

Singles

- "Lituation" ft. Philkeyz (2020)

== Filmography ==
Year	Film	Role	Notes
2010	Inale	Ene	with Hakeem Kae-Kazim, Caroline Chikezie and Nse Ikpe Etim
2011	The Return of Jenifa	Criss Cross	with Funke Akindele and Helen Paul
2013	House of Gold	Nina Dan Ansah	with Yvonne Nelson and Majid Michel
2014	Make a Move		with Ivie Okujaye and Majid Michel
2014	In the Music	Madam	with Chelsea Eze, Beverly Naya, Bryan Okwara
2019	Oluture	Sandra	with Ada Ameh, Beverly Osu, Daniel Etim Effiong, Gregory Ojefua
2022	Palava!	Aunty Ese	with Mercy Aigbe, Bisola Aiyeola, Segun Arinze, Eniola Badmus, Linda Ejiofor

== Awards and nominations ==
=== Selected awards and nominations ===
Year	Event	Prize	Recipient	Result	Ref
2009	The Headies 2009	Best Vocal Performance (Female)	"In the Music"	Won	
2014	ELOY Awards	Best Female Artist	—N/a	Nominated	
2016	The Headies 2016	Best Vocal Performance (Female)	"Play Na Play" (featuring Angélique Kidjo)	Nominated	
2018	The Headies 2018	Best Recording of the Year	"Butterflies"	Nominated	
2018	The Headies 2018	Best Vocal Performance (Female)	"Butterflies"	Won	

Awards and achievements
Preceded by Wande Coal (2008)	Next Rated Award; 2009	Succeeded by Skuki (2010)
Media offices
Preceded by Rita Dominic and eLDee (2011)	The Headies host (co hosted with M.I); 2012	Succeeded by Tiwa Savage and Dr SID (2013)
