= Lagos Cougars =

2013 film by Desmond Elliot

- Theatrical release poster
- Directed by: Desmond Elliot
- Screenplay by: Bola Aduwo; Emem Isong
- Produced by: Emem Isong
- Starring: Monalisa Chinda; Uche Jombo; Alex Ekubo; Daniella Okeke
- Production company: Royal Arts Academy
- Distributed by: Royal Arts Academy; Silverbird Distributions
- Release date: 3 December 2013
- Country: Nigeria
- Language: English

Lagos Cougars is a 2013 Nigerian romantic drama film directed by Desmond Elliot. It premiered on 3 December 2013 at the Silverbird Galleria, Victoria Island. The film revolves around the life of 3 corporate women; Elsie (Monalisa Chinda), Aret (Uche Jombo) and Joke (Daniella Okeke) in their quest to find love and explore their fantasies.

== Cast ==
- Monalisa Chinda as Elsie
- Uche Jombo as Aret
- Ifeanyi Kalu as Jite
- Daniella Okeke as Joke
- Shawn faqua as Vincent
- Benjamin Touitou as Lawrence
- Alex Ekubo as Chigo
- Musa Idris as Musa
- Temisan Etsede as Richard
- Katlong Dasac as Elsie's Homehelp
- John Akpan as Waiter
- Mackenpaule Eze King as Ruke
- Chichi Okafor as Tara
- Diana Yekinni as Chantelle

== Reception ==
The film was panned by critics. Nollywood Reinvented gave it an 18% rating, stating that the storyline and directing was poor and very unoriginal.

YNaija played down the love chemistry between Monalisa Chinda & her young lover Benjamin Touitou. It was also critical of the uneven directing of the film. The review concluded that "Lagos Cougars was funny but not always for the right reasons".

Sodas and Popcorn stated in its review that the story was "...predictable and cliche ridden...".

== See also ==
- List of Nigerian films of 2013
