= Eddie Watson =

Ghanaian actor (born 1980)

- Born: Eddie Samuel Obong Watson Jr. 22 May 1980 (age 46); Monrovia, Liberia
- Occupations: Actor, Producer
- Years active: 2010–present
- Spouse: Naomi Baaba Watson
- Children: 2

Eddie Samuel Ukpong Watson, commonly known as Eddie Watson, (born May 22, 1980) is a Liberian-born Ghanaian actor and producer. He received his first Ghanaian Movie Award in 2014 for his film 'Ebola' which he wrote, directed and produced. He’s mostly featured in international movies especially in Nollywood.

== Career ==
Watson's professional acting career started in 2010 with Labour of Love. He later went on the same year to star in the African war movie, Somewhere in Africa, where he had a supporting role. Costar Majid Michel suggested Watson to the director, Frank Rajah, for the role of a new character being introduced in the sequel 4Play Reloaded of the already popular 4Play by Venus Films. His supporting role in Frank Rajah’s Somewhere in Africa earned him a nomination at the Nollywood & African Films Critics Awards (NAFCA).

The following year, Watson had roles in movies like A Reason to Kill and Single Six and by 2011 the actor has made his first move into Nollywood when he starred alongside Queen Nwokoye in Desperate Heart. With movies like Single and Married in 2012, House of Gold, Letters to My Mother and Purple Rose in 2013 the actor soon became a house-hold name in African entertainment.

The year 2014, was a bittersweet year for Eddie, West Africa as a whole, and his home country, Liberia, which was one of the worst affected by the Ebola virus. Watson wrote, produced and directed the short film, Ebola. The year also brought many nominations for the actor for different roles in films such as Bachelors, Sister at War and Purple Rose. And for the first time he was nominated in two different categories for the Ghana Movie Award (Best Actor in Lead Role for Bachelors and Best Short Film for Ebola, which he won). The actor has now produced two major movies; Jack & Jill and She Prayed. On Saturday, December 5, 2015, Eddie Watson premiered She Prayed in Sierra Leone with support from some of the cast and other African movie stars including Majid Michel, Beverly Osu and Melvin Oduah. The screening of She Prayed is said to be the biggest show in all the premieres and all international shows in 2015 in Sierra Leone. The movie banked an impressive 98% hold of its premiere rating.

== Personal life ==
Eddie Watson and actress Naomi Baaba Watson welcomed their first child, Emirror (Emi) Kelsey Watson on February 2, 2015. Watson took to his Instagram page to share the passing of his mother Leonora Caulker on May 27, 2021.

== Humanitarian causes ==
Eddie Watson's documentary film "Ebola" was one of his humanitarian efforts after the outbreak hit West Africa in 2014. The film was meant to educate people in areas affected by the disease. The film was totally financed by Eddie Watson himself and was distributed to most media houses in countries affected plus others in the region of publication and also throughout the internet without a single charge from the actor. He launched the “We Need Help-Ebola Campaign” the same year the film was shot with the Twitter hashtag #WeNeedHelpEbola. The Ebola documentary film starred some popular faces in Ghana’s movie and music industries including Yvonne Nelson and Sarkodie and more. Later that year, the film went on to win Best Short Film Movie at the Ghana Movie Awards (GMA).

== Filmography ==
Selected Films

Year	Title	Role	Ref
N/A	Labour of Love		
2011	Somewhere In Africa	Clark	
2011	4Play Reloaded	Eddie	
2011	A Reason to Kill	Calvin	
2011	Single Six		
2012	Single and Married	Andy	
2013	House of Gold	Sam	
2014	Purple Rose	Dylan	
2014	Bachelors		
N/A	Single		
2014	Sisters at War		
2014	Jack & Jill (also as producer)	Jack	
2014	Single Married & Complicated	Andy	
2014	Don't Play That Game		
2014	Family Album		
N/A	Ebola The Documentary (also as producer)		
2015	Over The Edge	Jerry	
2015	Luke of Lies		
2015	She Prayed (also as producer)		
2016	Don't Fight it	Benson	
2017	3 Is a Crowd	Afam	
2018	Chain	Tomide	
2019	Size 12	Michael	
2020	Swapped	Akande Adebanjo	
2021	30 Days	Felix	
2022	Entwined	Sam	
2023	Mary Mary	Jason	
2024	Alaye	Ben	

Television

Year	Title	Ref
N/A	My Home season 1&2	
N/A	Happy Family season 4	

== Awards and nominations ==
Year	Award ceremony	Category	Film	Result	Ref
2017	Best of Nollywood Awards	Best Kiss in a Movie	Bias	Nominated	
