= If Tomorrow Never Comes (film) =

- Directed by: Pascal Amanfo
- Written by: Pascal Amanfo
- Produced by: YN Productions
- Starring: Rebecca Acheampong; Kweku Elliot
- Release date: 2016
- Country: Ghana

If Tomorrow Never Comes (film) is a 2016 Ghanaian drama that features the tumultuous life of Awurabena. Awurabena's mother committed suicide and following the suicide, Awurabena's uncle ends up selling Awurabena and the brother into slavery.

The film was written and directed by Pascal Amanfo and produced by YN Productions.

== Cast ==
- Yvonne Nelson as Awurabena
- Kweku Elliot
- Michelle McKinny Hammond
- Deyemi Okanlawon
- Belinda Asiamah
- Rebecca Acheampong
- Khareema Aguiar
- Bismark Nii Odoi
- David Dontoh
- Ophelia Dzidzormu
- Christy Ukata

== Screenings ==
The movie premiered at the 2016 Africa International Film Festival (AFRIFF).
