= Single and Married =

- Theatrical release poster
- Directed by: Pascal Amanfo
- Written by: Pascal Amanfo
- Produced by: Yvonne Nelson
- Starring: Yvonne Nelson; Chris Attoh; Nadia Buari; Tana Adelana; Kofi Adjorlolo; Eddie Watson; Jane 'Efya' Awindor
- Narrated by: Anita Erskin
- Cinematography: Kwame Awuah
- Edited by: Okey Benson
- Music by: Benny Arnti
- Production companies: Media GH; YN Production; Pascal Amanfo Expression
- Distributed by: Silverbird Distribution
- Release dates: 22 September 2012 (Ghana); 28 September 2012 (Nigeria)
- Running time: 101 minutes
- Countries: Ghana; Nigeria
- Language: English

Single and Married is a 2012 Ghanaian Nigerian romantic blue comedy film, produced by Yvonne Nelson and directed by Pascal Amanfo. It stars Yvonne Nelson, Chris Attoh, Nadia Buari, Tana Adelana, Kofi Adjorlolo, Eddie Watson and Jane 'Efya' Awindor. The film "centres on the drama, the intrigue and the dirty little secrets of three male friends, their sex lives, being single or married, and all the in-betweens".

The film received ten nominations at the 2012 Ghana Movie Awards and won four awards at the event, including Best Picture, Best Directing (English Language), Best Actress in a Support Role (English), and Best Cinematography.

A sequel, Single, Married and Complicated, was released in 2014.

== Plot ==
Jay a casanova, to the surprise of his friends, proposes to his girlfriend, Kimora. Jay's friend, Raymond a casanova who's now also married to one of Kimora's friends, Paula is indifferent. Andy the "baddest" of the trio, thinks Jay is about to get into a lifetime imprisonment.

One year after the marriage, Jay is having an affair with Judith, and constantly lies to Kimora. Jay eventually breaks up with her, because she's become too possessive of him; on his way out of her apartment, Jay bumps into Raymond, who's also coming out of a mistress' apartment, thereby discovering each other's secrets. Apparently, Paula, a lawyer, is always busy with work and never finds time for Raymond, while Kimora has also refused to give Jay a blowjob. Paula introduces Raymond to Yolanda, her old friend, and Raymond starts an affair with her as well.

Vida a friend of Kimora and Paula, is married to Ranesh, a 59-year-old man who leaves her very unsatisfied in bed. She meets her new neighbor Andy, and eventually confesses that she wants to have sex with him, leading to them having an affair.

Judith turns out to be a friend of Kimora's, and she's come to stay with the couple for a month. Judith constantly taunts Jay in front of his wife. Jay speaks out of tune during an argument with Kimora, leading to him confessing his affairs, including the one with Judith. Paula realizes that she's had a very bad sex life with her husband, so she makes a sex timetable; infuriates Raymond and he asks for a divorce. During the divorce deliberation, Paula reveals that she knows about Raymond's affair with Yolanda, and that it was in fact a bet between her and Yolanda.

Kimora leaves Jay's house. Ranesh catches his wife and Andy having sex; Andy escapes by jumping down from the first storey of the building, breaking his leg as a result. Paula gets back together with her husband, having been convinced to do so by her counselor. Raymond apologizes about everything, while Paula asks sweetly how many times he'd want to have sex in a week. Kimora also sees a counselor, then goes back to Jay and asks him to pull down his pants for a blowjob, but he refuses, overwhelmed by her presence. Andy is accosted by a lady who claims she's pregnant by him and tries to make a scene; Andy however cunningly escapes.

== Cast ==
- Yvonne Nelson as Kimora
- Chris Attoh as Jay
- Nadia Buari as Paula
- Tana Adelana as Vida
- Kofi Adjorlolo as Ranesh
- Eddie Watson as Andy
- Anita Erskin as Ruby
- Kweku Elliot as Raymond
- Jane Awindor as Judith
- Lisa Raymond as Sandy
- Michelle McKinney Hammond as Counselor
- Itz Tiffany as Yolanda

== Release ==
The film's trailer was released on YouTube on 25 July 2012, and currently has about ten million views, making it one of the most watched Nollywood trailers. It was released in Ghana on 22 September 2012, and premiered at the Silverbird Cinema, Victoria Island, Lagos on 28 September 2012.

== Reception ==
=== Critical reception ===
The film has a 24% rating on Nollywood Reinvented, which criticized the story direction, and the actors' performances. It concluded by stating, "Cinematography was nearly nonexistent! Pascal Amanfo did not do a shabby job - It wasn’t that bad; [However], with a movie like this and a title like Single and Married, I think it’d be a bit far-fetched to watch this movie looking for an amazing storyline. If you go in seeking a magnanimous storyline or to be thrilled, sorry but you will be disappointed. So go in to watch people drive fancy cars, live in pretty houses and wear colourful clothes". The Ghanaian Chronicle gave a positive review, commenting: "The storyline raised serious issues about why spouses cheat on their partners and how to stop them. But it was told in a rather subtle, entertaining way. It is indeed a must-see movie".

=== Awards ===
Single and Married had ten nominations at the 2012 Ghana Movie Awards, including Best Actress in a Lead Role (English) for Nelson, Best Actor in a Supporting Role (English) for Attoh, Best Picture – African Collaboration, Best Editing, Best Art Direction and Best Music (Original Song). It eventually won Best Picture, Best Directing (English Language), Best Actress in a Support Role (English), and Best Cinematography.

Complete list of awards
Award	Category	Recipients	Result
2012 Ghana Movie Awards	Best Picture	Pascal Amanfo	Won
2012 Ghana Movie Awards	Best Directing (English Language)	Pascal Amanfo	Won
2012 Ghana Movie Awards	Best Actress in a Lead Role (English)	Yvonne Nelson	Nominated
2012 Ghana Movie Awards	Best Actor in a Supporting Role (English)	Chris Attoh	Nominated
2012 Ghana Movie Awards	Best Actress in a Support Role (English)	Anita Erskine	Won
2012 Ghana Movie Awards	Best Picture – African Collaboration	Pascal Amanfo, Yvonne Nelson	Nominated
2012 Ghana Movie Awards	Best Cinematography	Kwame Amuah	Won
2012 Ghana Movie Awards	Best Editing	Okey Benson	Nominated
2012 Ghana Movie Awards	Best Art Direction		Nominated
2012 Ghana Movie Awards	Best Music (Original Song)	Abraham Affaine	Nominated
