= Olamide David =

Nigerian child actor (2001–2016)

- Born: c. 2001; Lagos State, Nigeria
- Died: 18 January 2016 (aged 14–15); Ikeja, Lagos, Nigeria
- Occupation: Actor
- Years active: 2013–2016
- Known for: Cobweb

Olamide David (c. 2001 – 18 January 2016) was a Nigerian child actor known for playing a lead role in the movie Cobweb. He won the "Best Male Actor Award" at the 2015 edition of the Best of Nollywood Awards after he had been previously nominated in the same category at the 2013 and 2014 editions. In addition to Cobweb, he had roles in a number of other feature films, including The Black Silhouette.

On 18 January 2016, Olamide died after sustaining a fatal abdominal injury while playing football.
