= Games Men Play =

2006 Nigerian drama film

- Directed by: Lancelot Oduwa Imasuen
- Written by: Emem Isong; Uche Jumbo
- Produced by: Rob Emeka Eze; Emem Isong
- Starring: Kate Henshaw-Nuttal; Ini Edo; Chioma Chukwuka; Chinedu Ikedieze; Kalu Ikeagwu; Jim Iyke; Dakore Egbuson
- Cinematography: Isaac Martins
- Distributed by: Reemmy Jes Productions
- Release date: 2006
- Country: Nigeria
- Language: English

Games Men Play is a 2006 Nigerian drama film directed by Lancelot Oduwa Imasuen.

== Plot ==
The film looks at the indiscretions among several wealthy Lagosian couples. The main protagonist Tara (Kate Henshaw-Nuttal) decides to do a research on relationships for a TV show, centering her research on couples which include a television talk show host Abby (Monalisa Chinda); her boyfriend Richmond (Mike Ezuruonye) and his greedy woman on the side (Ini Edo); a housewife with a painful past (Chioma Chukwuka) and her husband (Bob-Manuel Udokwu), haunted by dark secrets; and another housewife (Uche Jombo) struggling with a wealthy, cheating husband (Jim Iyke) and his demanding mistress (Dakore Egbuson).

== Cast ==
- Kate Henshaw-Nuttal
- Ini Edo
- Chioma Chukwuka
- Chinedu Ikedieze
- Kalu Ikeagwu
- Jim Iyke
- Dakore Egbuson
- Uche Jumbo
- Bob Manuel Udokwu
- Benita Nzeribe
- Michael Ezuruonye
- Monalisa Chinda
- Enyinna Nwigwe as Attorney

== See also ==
- List of Nigerian films of 2006
