= 2013 Ghana Movie Awards =

Awards ceremony

The 2013 Ghana Movie Awards was held at the Accra International Conference Center on 30 December 2013. A Northern Affair and Contract were the top winners for the night.

== Awards ==
=== Category ===
Best Original Score

- Ivan Ayitey - Contract
- Berni Anti – House of Gold
- Shaun Burdick - A Northern Affair

Best Writing (Adapted or Original Screenplay)

- Contract – Herty Owusu and Shirley Frimpong-Manso
- House of Gold - Pascal Amanfo
- A Northern Affair – Leila Djansi
- The Pledge – Benjamin Dwomoh
- Cheaters - Frank Rajah Arase

Best Production Design

- Okomfo Anokye - Brinks Abdullai and Bismark Gyamerah
- The Pledge - D.j Vegas/Ghana Armed Forces
- A Northern Affair -Tony Tomety/Palm Gottfried
- Contract - Shirley Frimpong-Manso & Ken Attoh
- House of Gold - Pascal Amanfo

Best Editing

- A Northern Affair - Dave Goldberg
- Contract - Nana Akua Manso
- Nkuli - Afra Marley
- House of Gold - Okey Benson
- The Hunters - Enoch Opoku

Best Music (Original Song)

- Kobby Maxwell - One Night in Vegas
- Abena Fosua - Okomfo Anokye
- Berni Anti and Mercy Chinwo - House of Gold
- Jon Germain and Kofi Aykeame A Northern Affair
- Raquel for Contract

Best Makeup & Hair Stylist

- Barima Nye Sunye - Jude Odeh
- Purple Rose - Lydia Ashietey
- The Price - Foreal Mensah
- House of Gold - Joyce Mensah

Best African Collaboration - Best Actor

- Contract - Hlomla Dandala
- Number one Fan - Yemi Blaq
- Finding Mercy - Desmond Elliot
- House of Gold - Francis Odega
- Volunteers – Bobby Obodo

Best African Collaboration - Best Actress

- Purple Rose - Nse Ikpe Etim
- Finding Mercy - Rita Dominic
- House of Gold - Omawumi Megbele
- Volunteers - Ivie Okujaye
- Slave Boy - Patience Ozokwor

Best Sound Mixing & Editing

- Contract – Mawuli Tofah
- House of Gold - Berni Anti
- A Northern Affair - Shaun Burdick
- ''One Night in Vegas - Black Tim

Best Actor in a Supporting Role

- Kwadwo Nkansah (lilwin) - Time Changes
- Henry Adofo Asiedu - House of Gold
- Jon Germain – A Northern Affair
- Van Vicker - One Night in Vegas
- Edward Agyekum Kufuor – The Pledge

Best Actress in a Supporting Role

- Lydia Forson - Volunteers
- Lisa Nana Yaa Awuku - Nkuli
- Rose Mensah (Kyeiwaa) - Time Changes
- Roselyn Ngissah - The Pledge
- Joselyn Canfor Dumas - A Northern Affair

Best Actor in a Leading Role

- John Dumelo - A Northern Affair
- Kofi Adu (Agya Koo) - Okomfo Anokye
- Adjetey Anang - The Hunters
- James Gardiner - Nkuli
- Majid Michel - The Price

Best Actress in a Leading Role

- Jackie Appiah - Cheaters
- Yvonne Okoro - Contract
- Maame Serwaa - School Girl
- Yvonne Nelson - The Price
- Sonia Ibrahim - Number one Fan

Best Short Film

- Campus scandals
- Galamsey
- Hospitals

Best Picture

- A Northern Affair
- Contract
- Hunter
- House of Gold
- One Night in Vegas
- Number one fan
- Purple Rose
- The Pledge
- Finding Mercy
- Okomfo Anokye

=== Special awards ===
Monalisa Magazine Award for Best Movie

- Heartbreak Hotel

Monalisa Magazine Awards for Best Actor in a Series

- Funny Face

Monalisa Magazine Awards for Best Actress in a Series

- Esi of Chorkor Trortroor

Glitz Magazine’s Favourite Actor

- John Dumelo - A Northern Affair

Glitz Magazine’s Favourite Actor

- Jackie Appiah - Cheaters

Glitz Magazine’s Fan’s Favourite Actor

- Prince David Osei

Glitz Magazine’s Fan’s Favourite Actress

- Yvonne Nelson
