= Awakening (2013 film) =

2013 Nigerian dark thriller

- Theatrical poster
- Directed by: James Omokwe; Ethan Okwara
- Screenplay by: David 'Gee' Ahanmisi
- Story by: James Omokwe; Ethan Okwara
- Produced by: Theresa Ananenu
- Starring: OC Ukeje; Kehinde Bankole; Femi Brainard; Bryan Okwara
- Cinematography: Unlimited LA
- Edited by: Ethan Okwara
- Music by: Flo; XT Samurai; Sons of Liberty
- Production companies: Studio 84; Magic Effects; RealDreams Integrated; DM2
- Distributed by: Amber11 Media
- Release date: 8 March 2013
- Country: Nigeria
- Language: English

Awakening is a 2013 Nigerian dark thriller film directed by James Omokwe and Ethan Okwara and starring OC Ukeje, Kehinde Bankole, Femi Brainard and Bryan Okwara. It was nominated for the category AMAA Achievement In Visual Effects at the 9th Africa Movie Academy Awards. The film was the highest rated film on Nollywood Reinvented at the time of release, with a score of 81%.

== Cast ==
- OC Ukeje as Nicholas
- Kehinde Bankole as Zainab
- Bryan Okwara
- Femi Brainard as Joseph
- Deleke Aroleye as Agent Gbade
- Tope Tedela
- Stan Nze as Club Manager

== Reception ==
The film received mostly positive reviews and was highly praised for its brilliant and believable visual effects. Nollywood Reinvented gave it an 81% rating, which was the highest score on the website at the time and stated that "The story in this movie is just amazing, and not just the core story itself but the little bits that make-up the whole. The scriptwriter does an amazing job of tying everything together so that nothing is out of place, and everything is related in one way or another whether or not it is explicitly stated. So much so that I am tempted to say that the scriptwriter was the star of the movie. The movie requires your attention and if you blink you might miss something critical". It also commended Kehinde Bankole's acting skills, stating "Watching Kehinde Bankole on screen is nothing short of an experience.... she commands your attention throughout." Sodas and Popcorn gave it 4 out of 5 stars, stating "James Omokwe and Ethan Okwara’s directing skills are no doubt good. the movie had the best special effects I have ever seen in a Nollywood production and the fight scenes, totally Believable. The choice of actors was good."

== Accolades ==
Awakening received a nomination at the 9th Africa Movie Academy Awards for the category Achievement In Visual Effects (alongside Last Flight to Abuja and The Twin Sword). It was also nominated for Movie of the Year at the 2014 Africa Magic Viewers' Choice Awards.

== See also ==
- List of Nigerian films of 2013
