= A Northern Affair =

2014 Ghanaian-Nigerian romantic drama film

- Theatrical Poster
- Directed by: Leila Djansi
- Screenplay by: Leila Djansi
- Produced by: Mabel Germain
- Starring: John Dumelo; Joselyn Dumas; Jon Germain; Beverly Afaglo; Kofi Adjorlolo
- Release date: 3 January 2014
- Countries: Ghana; Nigeria
- Language: English

A Northern Affair is a 2014 Ghanaian romantic drama film directed by Leila Djansi, and starring John Dumelo, Joselyn Dumas & Kofi Adjorlolo. It won the Africa Movie Academy Award for Best Production Design at the 10th Africa Movie Academy Awards.

== Plot ==
The romantic relationship between nurse Esaba Jomo (Joselyn Dumas) and Dr Manuel Quagraine (John Dumelo), who work together in a clinic in a remote fishing village, is threatened when their secrets are revealed.

== Cast ==
- John Dumelo as Manuel Quagraine
- Joselyn Dumas as Esaba Jomo
- Kofi Adjorlolo as Mr. Jomo
- Jon Germain as Mark Jomo
- Randall Obeng Sakyi as Magistrate
- Eddie Coffie as Esaba's Attorney
- Ben Torto as Architect
- Beverly Afaglo as Biana
- Irene Asante as Cynthia
- Maame Dufie Boateng as Precious
- Gifty Temeng as Aunty June
- Edith Nuong Faalong as Cara

== Reception ==
Nollywood Reinvented praised the directing, production, story and originality of the film. It currently has a 46% rating on the site.
