= 2012 Ghana Movie Awards =

Ghanaian awards ceremony

The 2012 Ghana Movie Awards was the third edition of the ceremony to reward excellence in the Ghanaian Film Industry. The event was held at Accra International Conference Center on December 2, 2012. The nomination party took place on November 26, 2012.

== Awards ==
Best Actor in a Lead Role (English)

- Van Vicker – Joni Waka
- John Dumelo – Queen Latifa
- Prince David Osei – Off The Hook
- Kofi Adjorlolo – Wipe My Tears
- Ekow Blankson – Secret Burden

Best Actress in a Lead Role (English)

- Yvonne Nelson – Single & Married
- Martha Ankomah – Tears of a Smile
- Jackie Appiah – Grooms Bride
- Nana Akua Addo – Wanna Be
- Yvonne Okoro – 3 Some
- Nadia Buari – Rain

Best Actor in a Lead Role (Local)

- Akwesi Boadi – Osofo Mafia
- Farida Mohammed – Gobana
- Kofi Adu – Agya Koo Trotro Driver
- Isaac Amoako – Saman Mogya
- Kwaku Manu – Area Boys

Best Actress in a Lead Role (Local)

- Nana Ama Mcbrown – Nyankonton
- Vivian Jill – My Story
- Linda Abbey – Saman Mogya
- Tracy Boakye – Oh Vera
- Mercy Asiedu – Baby Face

Best Actor in a Supporting Role (English)

- Adjetey Anang – Rain
- Majid Michel – Grooms Bride
- Rahim Banda – Wipe My Tears
- Edward Agyekum Kufuor – Tears Of A Smile
- Frank Artus – The Game
- Chris Attoh – Single & Married

Best Actress in a Support Role (English)

- Kalsum Sinare – 3 Some
- Anita Erskine – Single & Married
- Linda Awuku – Wanna Be
- Lydia Forson – In The Cupboard
- Christabel Ekeh – Wrong Target
- Nikki Samonas – Queen Latifa

Best Actor in a Support Role (Local)

- Apostle John Prah – Osofo Mafia
- Kwadwo Nkansah – Kweku Saman
- Samuel Ofori – Oh Vera
- Bernard Opoku – Police Officer
- Ebenezer Donkoh – B14

Best Actress in a Support Role (Local)

- Naana Hayford – Odo Ntentan
- Fatima Osman – Gobana
- Rose Mensah – Fathia Fata Nkrumah
- Emelia Brobbey – My Story
- Matilda Asare – Ghana Police
- Ellen White – Saman Mogya

Best Actor (African Collaboration)

- Kalu Ikeagwu – Shadow In The Dark
- Ramsey Nouah – Hotel Babylon
- Alex Usifo – Off The Hook
- Uti Nwachukwu – In The Cupboard
- Yemi Blaq – The Search
- Alex Ekubo – Lovelorn

Best Actress (African Collaboration)

- Ini Edo – In The Cupboard
- Patience Ozokwor – Untamed
- Rukky Sanda – The Search
- Nse Ikpe Etim –The Search
- Tonto Dikeh – Lovelorn
- Mercy Johnson – Wild Target

Best Picture – African Collaboration

- Desmond Elliot & Caroline Danjuma – In The Cupboard
- Yvonne Nelson – Single & Married
- Abdul Sallam – Grooms Bride
- Andy Boyo – Untamed
- Kobi Rana – Hotel Babylon

Best Picture

- Joni Waka – Van Vicker & Dr. Clarice Kulah-Ford
- Grooms Bride – Abdul Sallam
- Single & Married – Yvonne Nelson
- Trap In The Game – Frank Rajah Arase
- Ghana Police – Eugene Morrat
- Hotel Babylon – Kobi Rana
- Secret Burden – Sellasie Ibrahim
- Wanna Be – Edmund Quarshie & Michael Odeka

Best Cinematography

- Single & Married – Kwame Awuah
- Hotel Babylon – Kobi Rana
- Joni Waka – Van Vicker
- Area Boys – Kwame Agyeman
- Grooms Bride – Adams Umar

Best Editing

- Grooms Bride – Enoch Opoku
- Hotel Babylon – Kobi Rana
- Single & Married – Ebenezer Sowatey
- B14 – Ninja
- Wanna Be – Afra Marley

Best Costume and Wardrobe

- Queen Latifa – Mabel Germain
- Ghana Police – Monica Agboli & Nicolas Nsiah
- Return Of The Bukom Lion – De She Collections
- Fathia Fata Nkrumah – George Atobrah
- Grooms Bride – Samira Yakubu
- Secret Burden – Smarttys Management

Best Art Direction

- Return Of The Bukom Lion
- Fathia Fata Nkrumah
- Rain
- Ghana Police
- Single & Married
- Secret Burden

Best Music (Original Song)

- Azonto Ghost – Bessa
- Destiny's Child – Wilhelmina Abu Andani (Mimi)
- Single & Married – Abraham Affaine
- Wrong Target – Samuel Sarpong
- Fathia Fata Nkrumah – Adu Patrick

Best Directing (English Language)

- Single & Married – Pascal Amanfo
- Grooms Bride – Frank Rajah Arase
- Queen Latifah – Kensteve Anuka
- In The Cupboard – Desmond Elliot
- Hotel Babylon – Kobi Rana
