= The Green Eyed =

2015 Nigerian drama film

- Directed by: Blessing O. Uduefe
- Produced by: Endy Abanonkhua
- Starring: Nse Ikpe Etim; Kalu Ikeagwu; Tamara Eteimo; Blossom Chukwujekwu
- Production company: Poise Fendy Entertainment
- Distributed by: Silverbird Film Distributions
- Release date: 6 February 2015
- Country: Nigeria
- Language: English

The Green Eyed is a 2015 Nigerian drama film, directed by Blessing O. Uduefe. It stars Nse Ikpe Etim, Kalu Ikeagwu, Tamara Eteimo and Blossom Chukwujekwu. The film was shot in Port Harcourt.

== Cast ==
- Nse Ikpe Etim as Roli
- Kalu Ikeagwu as Michael
- Tamara Eteimo as Juliet
- Uche Ajie as Agent
- Phil Isibor as Uyota
- Joe Aniele as Joel
- Emios Ossai as Madman
- Tonia Nwosu as Elizabeth
- Felix Benjamin as Senator
- Endy Abanonkhua as Ofure
- Blossom Chukwujekwu as Gbubemi
- Fedora Abanonkhua as Vanessa
