= Weekend Getaway =

2012 film by Desmond Elliot

- Theatrical release poster
- Directed by: Desmond Elliot
- Screenplay by: Bola Aduwo; Kehinde Joseph; Uduak Isong
- Produced by: Emem Isong; Ini Edo; Monalisa Chinda
- Starring: Genevieve Nnaji; Ramsey Nouah; Monalisa Chinda; Ini Edo; Uti Nwachukwu; Alexx Ekubo; Bryan Okwara; Beverly Naya; Uru Eke
- Edited by: Victor Ehi-Amedu
- Production company: Emem Isong Productions
- Distributed by: Royal Arts Academy; Silverbird Distributions
- Release date: 29 March 2012
- Country: Nigeria
- Language: English
- Box office: ₦22,895,273 (domestic gross)

Weekend Getaway is a 2012 Nigerian romantic drama film directed by Desmond Elliot and starring Genevieve Nnaji, Ramsey Nouah, Monalisa Chinda, Ini Edo, Uti Nwachukwu, Alexx Ekubo, Bryan Okwara, Beverly Naya and Uru Eke. It received 11 nominations and eventually won 4 awards at the 2013 Nollywood & African Film Critics Awards (NAFCA). It also received 2 nominations at the 2013 Best of Nollywood Awards with Alexx Ekubo eventually winning the award for Best Actor in a supporting role. The film was a box-office success in Nigerian cinemas generally because of its star-studded cast.

== Cast ==
- Genevieve Nnaji as April
- Ramsey Nouah as Dr. Mark
- Monalisa Chinda as Yolanda Okpara
- Ini Edo as Ogechi
- Uti Nwachukwu as Mahadi Bello
- Beverly Naya as Angela
- Alexx Ekubo as Andre Dikeh
- Bryan Okwara as Moses
- Uru Eke as Uduak
- Ekere Nkanga as Moses's Father
- Ime Bishop Umoh as Concierge
- Bobby Obodo as Segun Williams
- Emeka Duru as Convoy Driver
- Pat Akpabio as Nancy

== Critical reception ==
The film was widely met with negative critical reviews. It has 20% rating on Nollywood Reinvented, which criticized its originality, story and predictability.

Wilfred Okiche of YNaija did an extensive review. He commented that while the star quality was there, they didn't have much of a script to work with. He noted also excessive product placements, poor editing, and bad acting.

NollywoodCritics spoke on the negative correlation of the various story lines and commented "Genevieve is a Secret agent, Ini Edo is a Maid in Manhattan, Monalisa Chinda is a Sugar mummy, Ramsey Noah is from Cinderella Story..."

Efe Doghudje of 360Nobs on the other hand gave an average rating of a 6 out of 10 stars, calling the film "cute and kind of funny." The reviewer thought the acting was good in some spots but in many ways not believable. Uti's "scene with Genevieve, which was supposed to be smart, witty, sarcastic and sensual lacked such intensity of acts like Jinx and James Bond (Halle Berry and Pierce Brosnan) or Mr. & Mrs. Smith, secret service agents (spies whichever suits you) with an eye on the prize."

== See also ==
- List of Nigerian films of 2012
