= Francis Odega =

Nigerian comic actor

- Born: 1970 (age 55–56); Aniocha North, Delta State, Nigeria
- Education: Ambrose Alli University
- Occupations: Comedian; actor
- Years active: 1996–present
- Known for: comic roles and viral video clips

Francis Odega is a Nigerian comic actor best known for a comedic video clip of him that went viral and circulated on the Internet. It brought him to the limelight as he secured endorsement deals and recognition from foreign celebrities, such as 50-cent, who Odega claimed followed him on Instagram

== Education and career ==
Francis holds a bachelor's degree in Economics after graduating from Ambrose Alli University. He is one of the pioneering comedians of the popular Night of a Thousand Laughs comedy show. In 2013, Francis won the "Best Actor" award alongside Hlomla Dandala in the "Best African Collaboration" category at the 2013 Ghana Movie Awards. Francis came into the limelight after a scene from the movie series Back From South Africa hit the internet with notable people like 50 Cent and Tinie Tempah sharing the video clip of the scene on Instagram. The scene captures him comically speaking in an American accent.

== Selected filmography ==
=== Films ===
- Domitilla (1996) as Receptionist
- Osuofia in London (2003) as Obiekwe
- Baby Police (2003) as Brutus
- Evil Woman (2003)
- Buried Alive (2003)
- Holy Cup (2003)
- Akpu Nku (2003)
- Force on the Run (2004)
- Royal Messengers (2006)
- Emotional Blunder (2006)
- Chicken Madness (2006)
- Under The Sky (2006)
- Royal Messenger (2006)
- Store Keeper (2006)
- Bird Flu (2007) as Johnbull
- My Last Wedding (2009) as Talambe
- Village Rascals (2012)
- House of Gold (2013) John Bosco
- The Perfect Plan (2014) as Ololo
- Desperate Sisters (2015) as Bobo
- ATM (2016) as Gbenga
- Celebrity Marriage (2017) as Emeka
- Marry Max Again (2018)
- Sade Takes Lagos (2019) as Bassey
- It's a Crazy World (2020) as China
- How You Wan Die (2021) as Paulo
- Ikemba (2022)
- The Trade (2023) as Lawrence
- The Suyis (2024) as Ozo
- Sword of God (2024) as Sam
- Adebayo (2023)

=== Soaps ===
- Clinic Matters

== Endorsement ==
After the video clip went viral, Francis signed an endorsement deal with telecommunications company Etisalat as its brand ambassador.
