= Torn (2013 Nigerian film) =

2013 Nigerian psychological thriller film

- Directed by: Moses Inwang
- Produced by: Moses Inwang
- Starring: Monalisa Chinda; Ireti Doyle; Joseph Benjamin; Julius Agwu
- Release date: 27 July 2013
- Running time: 101 minutes
- Country: Nigeria

Torn is a 2013 Nigerian psychological thriller film directed by Moses Inwang and starring Joseph Benjamin, Ireti Doyle and Monalisa Chinda. It received five nominations at the 2013 Best of Nollywood Awards for categories Director of the Year, Movie of the Year, Best Edited Movie, Best Screenplay, and Best Actress in a Leading Role, but did not win any awards.

== Cast ==
- Ireti Doyle as Ovu
- Monalisa Chinda as Nana
- Joseph Benjamin as Olumide
- Bimbo Manuel as the psychotherapist
- Femi Ogedengbe as Inspector
- Tope Tedela as Young Olumide
- Julius Agwu

== Reception ==
Nollywood Reinvented praised the film's storyline, calling it a departure from the usual form of storytelling used in Nollywood. It currently holds a 59% average rating.

== See also ==
- List of Nigerian films of 2013
