= Chinwe Isaac =

Nigerian actress

- Born: Chinwekene Isaac Udokporo; Owerri, Imo State
- Education: National Diploma in Music, University of Nigeria; Bachelor's degree in Political Science, Lagos State University
- Alma mater: University of Nigeria; Lagos State University
- Occupation: Nigerian actress
- Awards: Face of Igbo Movie of the Year

Chinwekene Isaac Udokporo is a Nigerian actress. She won the 2019 City People Movie Award for Face of Igbo Movie of the Year, presented by City People Magazine.

== Early life and education ==
Isaac was born in Owerri, Imo State. She celebrates her birthday on 5 September.

Issac earned a national diploma in music from the University of Nigeria Nsukka. Thereafter, she studied political science at the Lagos State University (LASU) part-time while acting.

== Career ==
Isaac's acting career started in 2008, she became prominent when she was featured in the Nollywood movie One Last Feeling. However, she became more notable when she featured in the movie Isioma Scotland. Because of her role in this movie, she won an award as the Face of Igbo Movie of the Year. Isaac's passion for acting started when she was a child. She played major roles in school dramas. Coincidentally, both her parents were actors. They used to act in church dramas, so they were very supportive of her.

In a 2012 list compiled by Vanguard, Isaac was listed as one of the top five hot Nollywood actresses to watch out for. Isaac declared her intention to quit acting to focus on a new direction for her life. Her decision to stop acting was because she wanted to build a happy marital home. She later featured in some movies. She became an A-list actress three years after joining the movie industry. While she was in Imo State, she registered with the state chapter of the Actors Guild of Nigeria (AGN) before relocating to Lagos State for her studies.

== Personal life ==
Isaac had to quit acting to get married. She met her lover, Laclass Ozuogwu, an Enugu-based producer, at the Actors Guild of Nigeria office in Surulere.

== Selected filmography ==
- Uncomfortable Truth (2014) as Maya
- Painted Lies (2014) as Maya
- Icheke Oku (2016) as Nwaka
- Loud Silence(2016) as Thelma
- Isioma Scotland (2017)
- Queen of the Sun (2018) as Adaku
- A Taste of Grief (2019) as Juliet
- Mr Lover Lover(2020)
- Please Say No (2023) as Diane
- Far In-between(2023) as Sophy
- Sweet16
- Girls War
- Leave my Wife
- Twisted Desires
- Untamed
- Cobra
- Destitute

== Accolades ==
Awards and Nominations
Year	Awards	Category	Result	Ref.
2019	City People Movie Awards	Best Actress of the Year (Igbo)	Nominated	
2019	City People Movie Awards	Face of Igbo Movie of the Year	Won	
2019	City People Movie Awards	Best Comedy Actress of the Year(Igbo)	Nominated	
2019	City People Movie Awards	Best Igbo Film of the Year (Isioma Scotland)	Nominated	
2013	2013 Best of Nollywood Awards	Revelation of the Year (Female)	Nominated	
