= Nuong Faalong =

Ghanaian actress and journalist

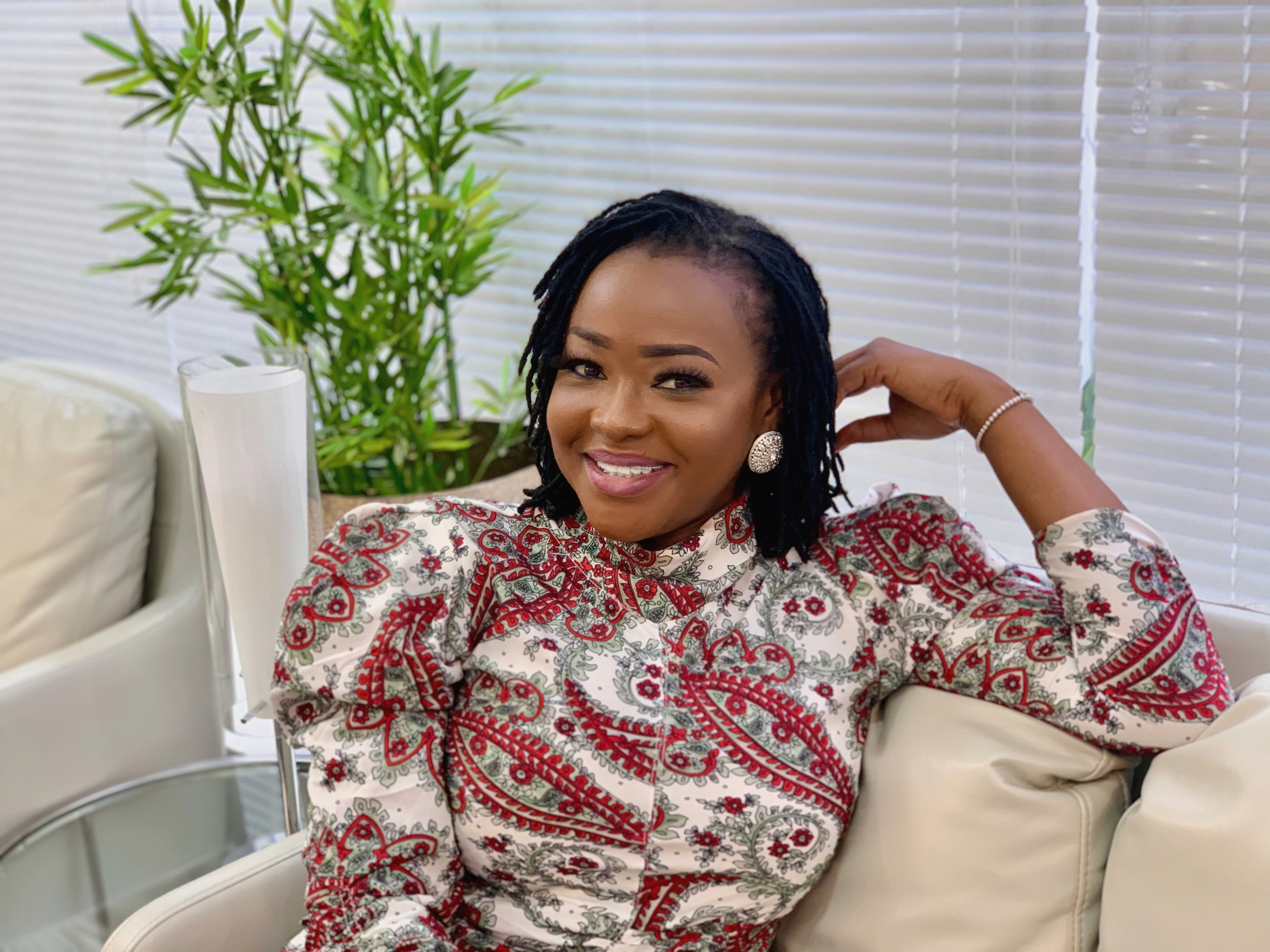
- Portrait of Nuong Faalong, 2020
- Born: Edith Nuong Faalong; Tamale, Ghana
- Citizenship: Ghanaian
- Education: University of Ghana, Legon
- Occupations: Journalist, actress
- Known for: Affirmative action

Edith Nuong Faalong is a Ghanaian entrepreneur, journalist, writer, activist and also actor.

== Early life and education ==
Nuong hails from Lawra in the Upper West Region of Ghana, She had her secondary education at Aburi Girls Senior High School and later continued to the University of Ghana, Legon .

== Career ==
Faalong joined Media General Ghana Limited in 2017 as a broadcaster for 3 FM and TV3. She is the first woman and the youngest journalist to host Hot Issues, a current affairs show on TV3. She worked in the TV3 newsroom and was also a member of the newspaper review team. Nuong is seen to be very informed and outspoken on social issues within her country. Faalong served as the television host for the Spotlight, a current affairs programme on Mx24gh a media and television station in Ghana.

As an actor, she made headlines with her quick rise after only a short time in the Ghanaian film industry. She has been tipped as an actress to look out for especially after her role in Garrett Batty's Freetown which won her the Actress of the Year (Non-Nigerian) in the 2016 Nigeria Entertainment Awards (NEA). She has featured in a number of TV series and movies such as 'Living with Trisha', 'A Northern Affair', 'Broadway', 'Sins Of Our Fathers' and 'Crime in Love', among others.

Faalong is the founder of Earthyria.

== Women's Advocacy ==
Faalong is an advocate for affirmative action in Ghana's parliament and is keen on parity and inclusive development. She refers to herself as a feminist who advocates for women's rights in all aspects of life and endeavor.
