= Bryan Okwara =

Nigerian model

- Born: Ikenna Bryan Okwara; 9 November 1985 (age 40)
- Citizenship: Nigerian
- Occupations: Actor, Influencer
- Years active: 2007–present
- Modeling information
- Height: 6 ft 3 in (191 cm)

Bryan Okwara also known as Ikenna Bryan Okwara (born 9 November 1985) is a Nigerian actor of Igbo descent.

== Education ==
He obtained a degree in International Relations from the Lagos State University, Ojo.

== Career ==
He started his career as a model and gained grounds in 2007. He is a pageant contestant who won the title of Mr. Nigeria in 2007 and reached the semi-finals in the Mister World 2007 competition. He debuted as an actor in 2008 when he starred in a movie Heart To Heart which was directed by Remi the CEO of Africa Awake.

== Personal life ==
Bryan is not married but in February 2020 he welcomed a child with his long-time girlfriend, Marie Miller.

== Controversies ==
There were speculations that the Ghanaian/Nigerian actress Juliet Ibrahim is the long-lost sister of Bryan. He pressured his parents to get to the root of the matter and share an update when that is achieved.

There were speculations that Bryan was dating internationally recognized Nigerian model Bunmi Ademokoya, but the actor denied the rumors in 2014.

== Awards ==
- Mr Nigeria (2007)
- Best African Male Model (2010)

== Filmography ==
Year	Title	Role
2024	Blind Date	Nick
2023	Brown Sugar	Olaolu
2023	Thin Lines	Shadrach
2020	Ejiro	Silas
2020	Time to be a Man	
2019	No Budget	Osagie
2018	If I Am president	Timi
2018	The Washerman	Ric
2018	Crazy People	Guest Appearance
2016	Entreat	Charles
2016	Romance is Overrated	
2015	The MatchMaker	Mike
2015	In the Music	Chris
2014	Beauty of the Mind	Pere
2014	Shattered Romance	Jay
2014	One Night Stand	
2014	Finding Love	
2014	I Think He loves Me	
2013	Awakening	
2012	True citizen	
2012	Weekend Getaway	Moses Inwang
2011	I'll Take My Chances	Ikechukwu Okereke
