= Alan Poza =

2013 film by Charles Novia

- Theatrical poster
- Directed by: Charles Novia
- Screenplay by: Charles Novia
- Produced by: Charles Novia
- Starring: OC Ukeje; Beverly Naya; Okey Uzoeshi
- Cinematography: Uzodinma Okpechi
- Edited by: Tokunboh Akinsowo; Michael Asesse
- Production company: November Productions
- Release date: 10 March 2013
- Country: Nigeria
- Language: English

Alan Poza is a 2013 Nigerian romantic comedy film written, produced and directed by Charles Novia and starring OC Ukeje as Alan Poza. It received 2 nominations at the 9th Africa Movie Academy Awards. OC Ukeje also won a Best Of Nollywood Awards for his leading role as Alan Poza.

The plot follows Alan Poza (Ukeje), music executive label play boy, who schemes his way into the hearts of several women within and outside the media company he works for, in a bid to lure them into his bed. His various emotional escapades eventually lead him to trouble as one of his 'victims' is unable to handle the heartbreak he has caused her.

== Plot ==
Alan Poza (OC Ukeje) is a rich, young music label executive who is extremely narcissistic and boasts that he can get any lady he wants eating out of his hands in approximately "3 seconds". He refers to himself as a 'sharp-shooter' and the 'rave' amongst ladies.

Alan has a snazzy job in Scorpio Media, a top media company; and is convinced that he will be promoted to 'Vice-President'. His friend and partner-in-crime; 'Kokori Oshare' (Okey Uzoeshi) works in the same media house and is equally as 'notorious' as Alan. They share tales of their 'playboy' escapades and tend to 'help' each other out with conquering their 'victims'; women who are unaware of their riotous acts. Alan and Kokori inadvertently leave behind a trail of 'angry' women who want to see them punished for their sins.

In its bid to further penetrate the entertainment industry, Scorpio Media is split into 'Scorpio Movies' and 'Scorpio `Records', Kokori is made Vice-President of Scorpio Movies while new joiner; Pride (Beverley Naya) is appointed as the Vice-President of Scorpio Records. Alan is advised that her appointment is due to a wealth of experience within the industry and is made Pride's deputy. He is extremely embarrassed by this unexpected turn of events and vows to lure Pride into his bed and break her heart, so that he can become her boss technically and emotionally.

He is particularly angry that the Managing Director of the firm has strung him on for weeks. Kokori tells Alan that the reason he was sidetracked was because he had slept with Bunmi (Belinda Effah), who was also the Managing Directors' (Norbert Young) girlfriend.

Alan proceeds to charm Pride but she constantly refutes his efforts having heard that his nickname is 'Corporate Casanova' as well as of his 'vile' reputation with women, but Alan remains persistent.

Pride eventually agrees to go on a date with Alan after he signs a 'known' artist and ends up sleeping with him after 'one too many' drinks. She claims that their relationship is 'strictly business' and leaves the next morning without saying a word. Alan remains persistent in his pursuit and Pride finally gives in after making Alan sit through a 'torturous' evening 'daddy-sitting' her senile father and an extremely embarrassing counselling forum for sex addiction. At the counselling session Alan admits to being cheated on by his first love, blaming his current attitude to women on that experience. Pride tells him explicitly that she is a 'dangerous woman when in love' pleading with him not to hurt her.

Totally unplanned, Alan notices his secretary; Ina (Kemi Lala Akindoju); and falls in love with her. Ina is your typical 'good girl', extremely simple and caring. Pride finds out Alan is cheating on her when she walks into his office and sees him kissing Ina. She is hurt and enraged. Alan starts to receive threatening messages and Pride remains extremely upset with him.

One evening after work Alan, Kokori and Ina have plans to go out. Ina goes into the ladies toilet and does not come out, she has been kidnapped. Stood outside the ladies' toilet waiting for her, Alan receives a message from Pride telling him where Ina is being held. On getting there he finds Bunmi, threatening to kill Ina, knife in hand, she wants to see Alan hurt and decides the best way to achieve this is to kill Ina, the love of his life. It turns out that Bunmi was the one sending Alan threatening messages all along. She was one of his 'victims' and the relationship had ended badly. The police, led by Pride, rescue Alan and Ina and arrest Bunmi. Bunmi had stolen Pride's phone and sent Alan the message luring him to where Ina was being held. Alan promises to change his attitude to women completely after this ordeal.

Six months later; the movie ends with Kokori marrying singer, Kiki, who Alan and Pride 'discovered' on their first date and signed up to Scorpio Records. Alan becomes a 'reformed casanova', him and Ina are still together and are looking forward to a fantastic future. He may get married some day.

== Cast ==
- OC Ukeje as Alan Poza
- Beverly Naya as Pride Eze
- Okey Uzoeshi as Kokori Oshare
- Belinda Effah as Bunmi
- Kemi Lala Akindoju as Ina
- Sylvia Oluchi as Senami
- Norbert Young as the Managing Director of Scorpio Media
- Charles Novia as Pastor Philips

== Reception ==
=== Critical reception ===
The film received mostly negative reviews from critics, especially as regards the script and storytelling. Nollywood Reinvented gave the film a 24% rating and wrote "For a comedy, Alan Poza is very unfunny. As a romance flick, it is very confusing. And for a drama, it is very chaotic. In the end O.C still didn’t come off to me as the player type. I was not certain how the heck anything happened." Sodas and Popcorn gave it a 3 out of 5 rating and wrote "The acting was my favorite bit of the whole movie, It pretty much beat the script. All the acts most notably OC Ukeje did justice to their roles. Together as an entire team, the chemistry wasn’t perfect but it was enjoyable and their characters were hilarious."

=== Accolades ===
Alan Poza received 2 Africa Movie Academy Awards (AMAA) nominations and OC Ukeje, who play the character "Alan Poza" won a Best of Nollywood Award (BON ).

== See also ==
- List of Nigerian films of 2013
