= Finding Mercy =

2013 film by Desmond Elliot

- Theatrical Poster
- Directed by: Desmond Elliot
- Written by: Kehinde Odukoya
- Screenplay by: Kehinde Odukoya
- Produced by: Desmond Elliot
- Starring: Rita Dominic; Uti Nwachukwu; Chioma Chukwuka; Blossom Chukwujekwu; Desmond Elliot
- Edited by: Dapo Ola Daniels
- Production company: Denziot Productions
- Release date: October 14, 2013 (AFRIFF); November 18, 2013 (Nigeria)
- Country: Nigeria
- Language: English

Finding Mercy is a 2013 Nigerian drama film produced and directed by Desmond Elliot, and starring Rita Dominic, Blossom Chukwujekwu, Uti Nwachukwu and Chioma Chukwuka.

== Cast ==
- Rita Dominic as Kassy
- Uti Nwachukwu as Rogers
- Chioma Chukwuka-Akpotha as Rita
- Blossom Chukwujekwu as Jato
- Tamara Eteimo as Ifeoma
- Desmond Elliot as Daniel Olatunji
- Abiola Segun-Williams as Angela
- Oyundamola Lampejo as Mercy
- Dabota Lawson as Thelma
- Faith Bungie
- Elsie Eluwa
- Cindy Haceenatu Massaquoi
- Yoko-Ono Manowe

== Reception ==
Nollywood Reinvented gave it a 56% rating, commending its production and directing. The reviewer found the film interesting in spite of the film's focus on the problems of daily living. Efe Doghudje of 360Nobs gave it a rating of 5 out of 10 stars. She criticized the inadequate costuming that meant that in spite of a strong cast, the characters were not very believable.

== See also ==
- List of Nigerian films of 2013
