= Monalisa Chinda =

Nigerian actor, film producer and TV personality (born 1974)

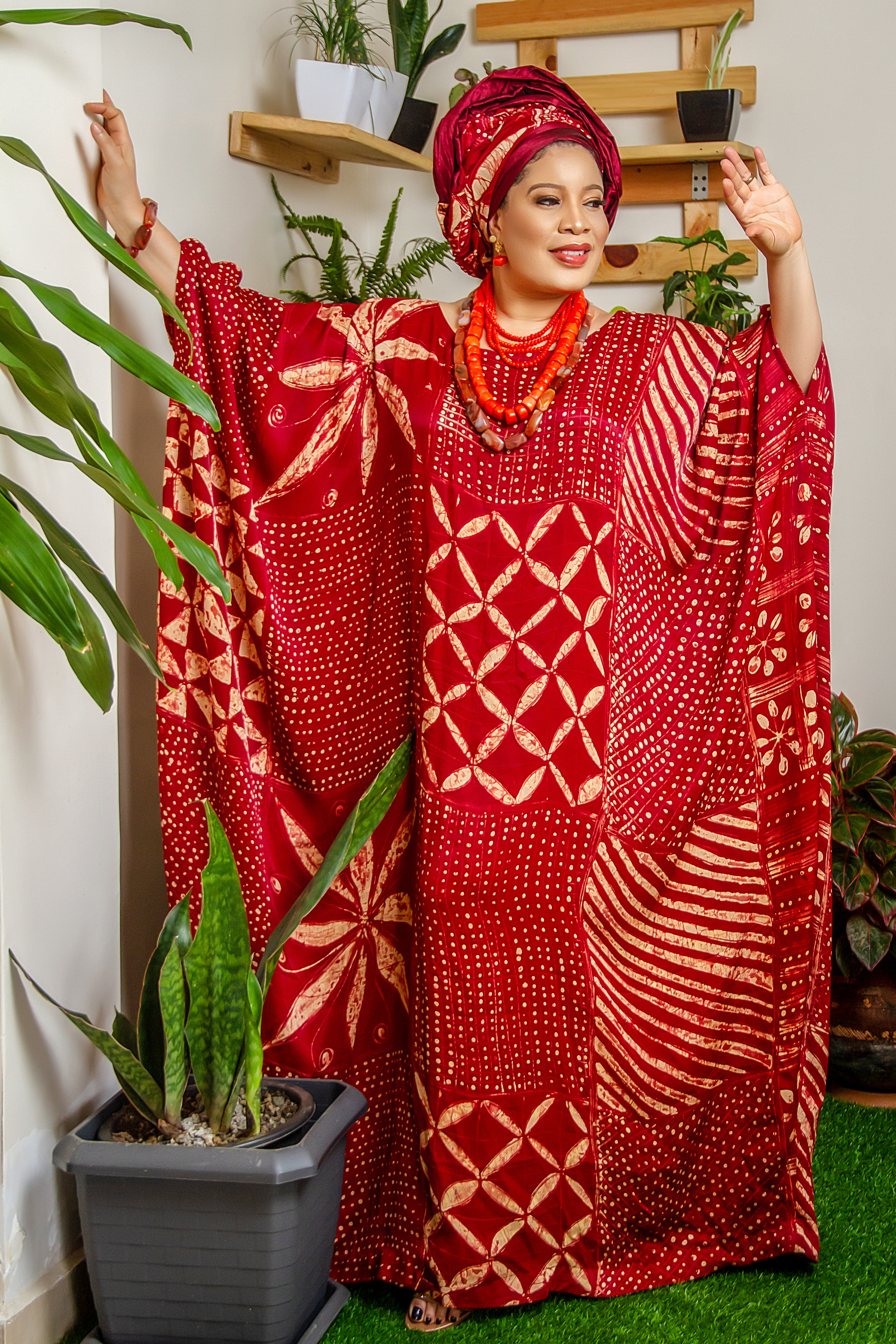
- Monalisa Chinda in 2021
- Born: 13 September 1974 (age 51); Port Harcourt, Rivers, Nigeria
- Education: Theatre arts, University of Port Harcourt
- Occupations: Actress, film producer, TV personality, media personality
- Years active: 1996–present
- Notable work: Pregnant Virgin
- Awards: Best Actress, Afro Hollywood Award 2009 at the Monte Carlo Television Festival

Monalisa Chinyere Chinda (born 13 September 1974) is a Nigerian actress, film producer, talkshow host, television personality, humanitarian and media personality.

== Early life ==
Monalisa Chinda was born in Port Harcourt, Rivers State, south-south Nigeria, to Ikwerre parents. She is the firstborn in a family of 6 children (two sons and four daughters). She attended Army Children's School GRA for Primary and then Archdeacon Crowther Memorial Girls' School, Elelenwo. Both schools are located in Port Harcourt, Nigeria. She obtained a degree in theatre arts from the University of Port Harcourt.

== Career and activities ==
Monalisa's first major movie was Pregnant Virgin, which she did in 1996 and subsequently, after she graduated in 2000, she did Above the Law and has done many others since then.

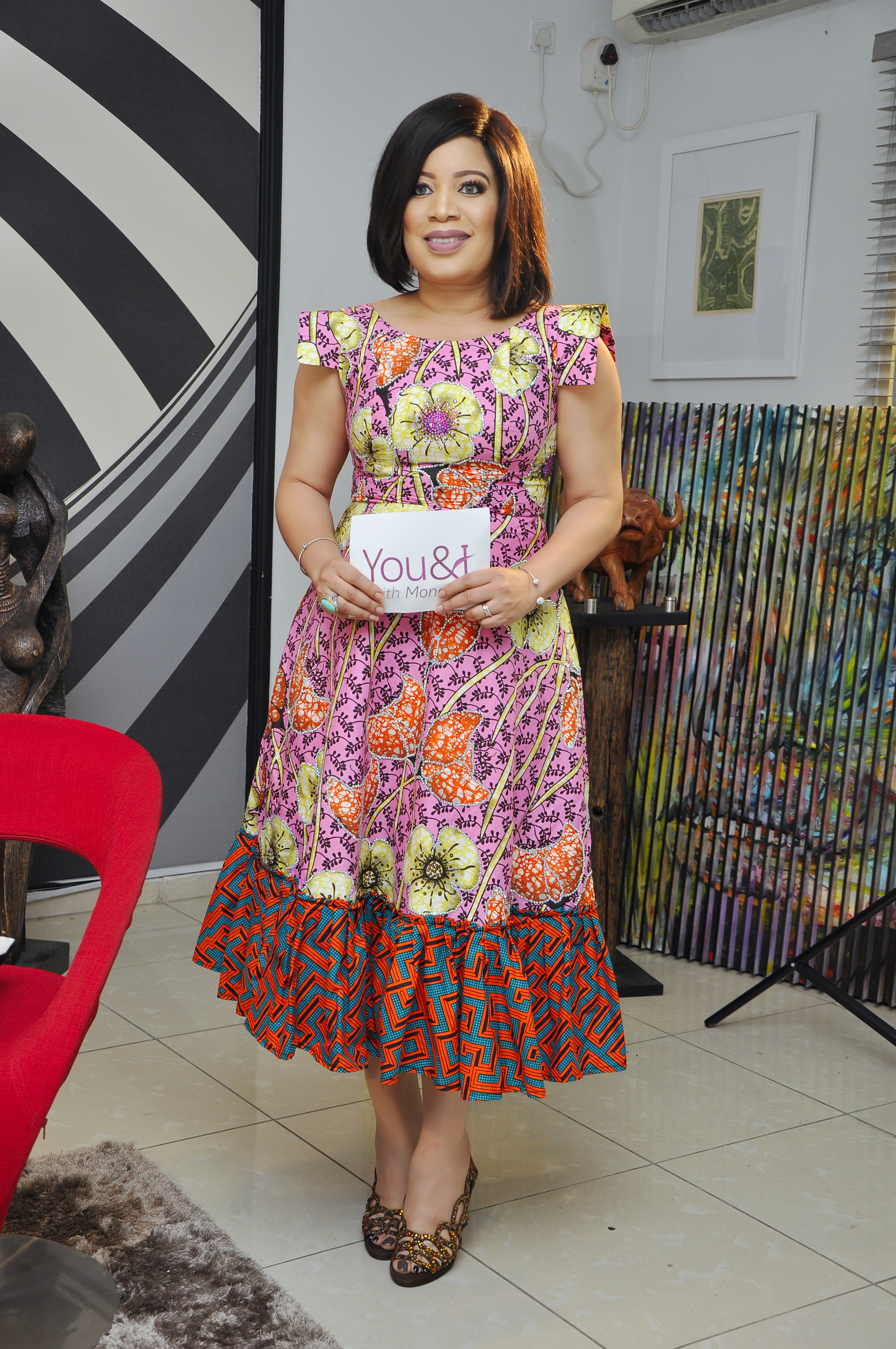
Monalisa on set of You&I with Monalisa in 2017

In 2007 her road to stardom kicked off when she started appearing in the television soap Heaven’s Gate. In 2011, she debuted as Executive Producer in the Royal Arts Academy movie, 'Kiss & Tell', which Emem Isong co-produced with her and Desmond Elliot directed. In 2012, she became one of the first of four Nollywood actors to be featured on the cover of Hollywood Weekly Magazine. In November 2014 the actress branched out of acting a little bit and debuted her Talk Show titled 'You & I with Monalisa."

Monalisa is involved in a lot of charity work. She has a column (Monalisa Code) in the Saturday edition of The Sun Newspapers where she writes on social issues and relationships. She is a consultant with Royal Arts Academy, a media school known for breeding new talents, in acting, directing, and screenwriting. She partnered with Goge African to encourage tourists in Nigeria.

== Awards and recognition ==
- In 2011, Monalisa was crowned the Face of Port Harcourt - Carnival Queen, in her hometown of Rivers State.
- In 2010, she was nominated for Best Actress in a drama series at the Terracotta TV and Film Awards
- Best Actress, Afro Hollywood Award 2009 at the Monte Carlo Television Festival

== Filmography ==
Year	Title	Role
1996	Pregnant Virgin	
2001	Kids Are Angry	Louisa
2004	Enslaved	
2005	Golden Moon	Loveline
2007	Royal Grandmother	Oluoma
2006	Sting 2	
2008	Critical Truth	Benita
2011	Kiss and Tell	Delphine
2013	Keeping my Man	Tamar
2009	Anointed Liars	Ann
2009	Breaking Heart	Lydia
2009	Without Goodbye	Ann
2000	Above the Law	
	City of Angels	
	Passionate Heart	
	Memories of the Heart	
2013	Itoro	Elena
2006	Spirit of Love	Anasteria
	Okon Lagos	
2006	Games Men Play	
	Nollywood Huslers	
2012	Weekend Getaway	Yolanda Okpara
2012	Gossip Nation	
2013	Torn	Nana
2013	Lagos Cougars	Elsie
2014	The Unthinkable	
	Evil Project	
2016	The Therapist	Helen
2017	At your Service	Evelyn
2017	The Personal Assistance	Clarice
2018	Crazy People	Guest Appearance
1695	Four wives and a mistress	Eleanor
2019	The Bling Lagosians	Ngozi Gomez
2019	The Night Bus to Lagos	
2020	The Good Husband	Rosa
2020	The Escort	Adaora
2021	Bouquet and Everything After	Bouquet god
2022	Different Strokes	Kevwe

== See also ==
- List of people from Port Harcourt
- List of Nigerians
