= Charles Novia =

Nigerian actor, producer and writer (born 1971)

- Born: Charles Osa Igbinovia; 20 November 1971 (age 54); Benin City, Edo State, Nigeria
- Education: University of Nigeria
- Occupations: Film director, producer, actor, writer
- Years active: 1996–present

Charles Osa Igbinovia (born 20 November 1971), commonly known as Charles Novia, is a Nigerian film director, producer, screenwriter, actor, social commentator and essayist. Born and raised in Benin City, the capital of Edo State, Nigeria, Novia is known for films such as Missing Angel (2004), Caught in The Middle and Alan Poza (2013). In 2014, he was chosen as part of the Nigerian team to screen Nollywood films for Best Foreign language category of the Academy Awards by the Academy of Motion Picture Arts and Sciences.

== Filmography ==
- Put a Ring on it (2016)
- Alan Poza (2013)
- Atlanta Series (2011)
- Caught in the Middle (2007)
- The Covenant Church (2006)
- Real Love (2005)
- Missing Angel (2004)
- The Pastor and Harlot (2002)
- The Bridesmaid (2005)

== See also ==
- List of Nigerian film producers
