= Rita Dominic =

Nigerian actress (born 1975)

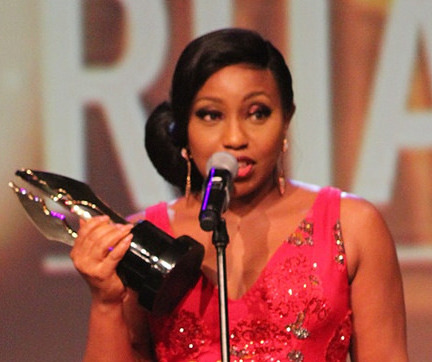
- Dominic at the Africa Magic Viewers Choice Awards in Lagos, Nigeria, March 2014
- Born: Rita Uchenna Nkem Dominic Nwaturuocha; 12 July 1975 (age 51); Mbaise, Imo State, Nigeria
- Education: University of Port Harcourt (BA in Theatre Arts)
- Occupation: Actress
- Years active: 1998–present
- Spouse: Fidelis Anosike (m. 2022)
- Awards: 2012 Africa Movie Academy Awards for Best Actress in a Leading Role

Rita Uchenna Nkem Dominic Nwaturuocha // (born 12 July 1975) is a Nigerian actress. She won the 2012 Africa Movie Academy Awards for Best Actress in a Leading Role.

In 2023, journalist Otosirieze Obi-Young described Dominic as “Nollywood’s most critically acclaimed actor” in a cover story for Open Country Mag, writing that she "morphed into very different characters and displayed some of the best acting in Nigerian film, blending skill and experience into a modulated range rarely seen in the industry."

== Early life and education ==
Dominic hails from Aboh in Mbaise, Imo State, Nigeria. She is the last out of four children. Her father was a medical doctor and her mother, a nursing officer. She attended Federal Government College Ikot Ekpene in Akwa Ibom State and proceeded to the University of Port Harcourt for her tertiary education. She had her BA in Theatre Arts in 1999.

== Career ==
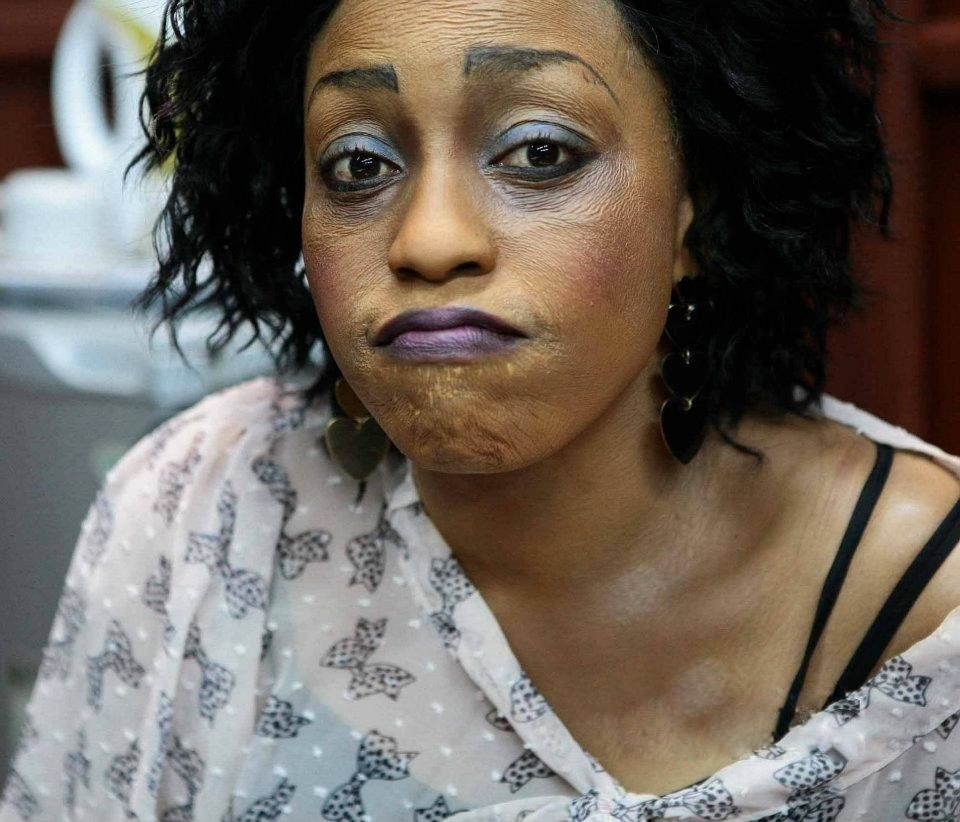
Dominic plays Clara Ikemba in The Meeting, a movie about a corporate executive who finds himself at the mercy of political patronage, bureaucratic red-tape and his experiences when he embarks on a seemingly simple business trip to Abuja to secure a government contract.

Dominic started performing as a child, appearing in school plays and children's television shows in Imo State. In 1998, she starred in her first movie, A Time to Kill. She has produced several movies including The Therapist, Light in the Dark, Bound, The Blindspot and Desecration. Over the years, she has received numerous honours. She also won the top actress award for the movie The Meeting in 2013 and 2017. She won the best actress in TV series. Dominic won the City People Awards in 2004 as the Most Outstanding Actress. Dominic has starred in over 100 Nollywood productions.

== Personal life ==
In 2019, Dominic, via her Instagram page, called for the prosecution of 28-year-old Idris Ebiloma. Dominic accused Ebiloma of raping 15-month old Khloe, on 31 August 2016 at the victim's home in Asokoro, Abuja.

On 5 April 2022, Dominic announced her engagement to Daily Times publisher Fidelis Anosike, and on 19 April 2022, they held their traditional wedding in Imo State, Dominic's state of origin.

In November 2022, Dominic held her white wedding with Fidelis Anosike in England. In attendance were Kate Henshaw, Chioma Chukwuka and others.

== Filmography ==
Year	Film	Role	Notes
1998	Children of Terror		
1999	Prisoner of Love		
1999	My Guy		
1999	Face of a Liar		with Stella Damasus-Aboderin
1999	Aba Riot		with Olu Jacobs and Segun Arinze
2003	Unforgettable		
2003	To Love a Thief		with Segun Arinze
2003	Throwing Stones		with Tchidi Chikere
2003	The Intruder		with Richard Mofe Damijo and Stella Damasus-Aboderin
2003	Street Life		
2003	Love You Forever		
2003	Lean on Me		with Segun Arinze
2003	Back from America	Falon	
2003	A Night to Remember		
2003	Accidental Discharge	Jane	with Hanks Anuku
2004	Working Class Lady		with Stephanie Okereke
2004	True Romance	Franca	with Richard Mofe Damijo and Desmond Elliot
2004	The Ingrate	Jacintha	
2004	The Faithful		with Desmond Elliot
2004	Sweet Love		
2004	Singles & Married		
2004	Schemers: Bad Babes	Doris	
2004	Nights of Riot		
2004	Love Temple	Uju	
2004	Love After Love	Desree	with Patience Ozokwor and Tchidi Chikere
2004	Lost Paradise		
2004	Last Wedding	Ann	with Ramsey Nouah, Omotola Jalade-Ekeinde and Joke Silva
2004	Indecent Act		with Richard Mofe Damijo
2004	I Believe in You		with Richard Mofe Damijo
2004	Goodbye New York		with Genevieve Nnaji
2004	Blood Diamonds		
2004	All My Life		with Omotola Jalade-Ekeinde, Zack Orji and Tchidi Chikere
2005	Wheel of Change		with Stella Damasus-Aboderin and Desmond Elliot
2005	Ultimate Crisis	Eno	with Ini Edo and Olu Jacobs
2005	Tricks of Women	Roselyn	
2005	The Begotten	Jane I	with Ini Edo
2005	Suicide Lovers		
2005	Queen of My Heart	Jane	
2005	Orange Groove		with Desmond Elliot
2005	Only Love	Adaora	with Ini Edo and Olu Jacobs
2005	Never Too Far		
2005	More Than Gold	Juliet	
2005	Love Story		
2005	Last Game		with Ini Edo
2005	Kill the Bride		with Mike Ezuruonye
2005	Joshua		
2005	Guys on the Line		with Stephanie Okereke
2005	Face of Africa	Tracey	
2005	Desperate Billionaire	Ashanti	with Kanayo O. Kanayo and Ini Edo
2005	C.I.D		
2005	Bless Me		with Mike Ezuruonye
2005	2 Face		with Desmond Elliot
2006	Wedding Fever		
2006	Unbreakable Affair	Joan	with Desmond Elliot
2006	Total Control	Annabel	with Kanayo O. Kanayo
2006	The Humble Lion	Dora	with Patience Ozokwor
2006	Sweet Sound		
2006	Spirit of Love	Udoka	
2006	Show Girls: Face of Africa 3	Tracey	
2006	Saviour	Linda	with Chioma Chukwuka
2006	Million Dollar Sisters		with Kanayo O. Kanayo
2006	Married for Money		with Mike Ezuruonye
2006	Last Offence		with Mike Ezuruonye
2006	Jealous Heart		
2006	Hidden Murderer		with Desmond Elliot
2006	Girls Cot	Alicia	with Genevieve Nnaji, Ini Edo and Uche Jumbo
2006	Dancing Heart	Ireti	with Ramsey Nouah and Olu Jacobs
2006	Connected Firm		with Zack Orji
2006	All I Have		with Mike Ezuruonye
2007	Yahoo Millionaire	Oyinda	with Desmond Elliot and Uche Jumbo
2007	The Next Election		with Kanayo O. Kanayo
2007	Sleek Ladies	Cleopatra	with Ini Edo
2007	Legal War		with Mike Ezuruonye and Patience Ozokwor
2007	Immaterial	Yemi	
2007	Caught-Up		with Desmond Elliot
2007	A Better Place	Blossom	with Desmond Elliot
2008	Yankee Girls		with Omotola Jalade-Ekeinde and Stella Damasus-Aboderin
2008	True Lies	Nicole	with Zack Orji
2008	White Waters	Norlah	This film received 12 nominations at the Africa Movie Academy Awards in 2008, winning 4 awards, including the awards for Best Cinematography and Best Sound.
2009	Run Away Prince	Vanesa	
2009	Saidi's Song	Pamela	
2012	The Meeting	Clara Ikemba	
2015	Iyore	Osarugwe	with Joseph Benjamin, Okawa Shaznay, Yemi Blaq, Paul Obazele & Bukky Wright.
2016	Suru L'ere	Akara seller	Cameo
2016	'76	Suzy	
2018	The Women		
2018	Bound	Chinenye	with Nichole Banna, Neye Balogun
2017	Mr & Mrs: Chapter Two	Sharon	
2017	Desecration	Linda Bruce	With Jane Adetona, Angel Angala, Rychardo Agbor
2019	The Big Fat Lie	Vera	with Tana Adelana, Mercy Aigbe, Eniola Badmus
2020	Light In The Dark	Jumoke Arinze	with Joke Silva, Ngozi Nwosu, Bimbo Ademoye, Kiki Omeili, Kalu Ikeagwu, & Mannie.
2021	La Femme Anjola	Anjola	with Nonso Bassey
2021	In Case of Incasity	Betty	With Toby Andrews - Watts, Ewan Borthwick
2021	The Therapist	Eloho Ojukwu	with Michelle Dede and Toyin Abraham
2023	The Trade	Doris	With Chiwetalu Agu, Nengi Adoki, Blossom Chukwujekwu
2023	Love and Life	Abike	with Chidi Mokeme, Michelle Dede
2025	Baby Farm		with Langley Kirkwood and Joseph Benjamin

== Awards and nominations ==
Year	Event	Prize	Work	Result
2004	City Peoples Awards	Outstanding Actress		Won
2009	2009 Best of Nollywood Awards	Best Actress Leading Role (Yoruba)		Nominated
2010	2010 Best of Nollywood Awards	Best Actress Leading role (English)	The Maiden	Nominated
2012	Kalasha Film Festival and Television Awards Kenya	Best Actress	Shattered	Won
2012	2012 Nigeria Entertainment Awards	Best Actress lead role	Shattered	Nominated
2012	8th Africa Movie Academy Awards	Best Actress In a Leading Role	Shattered	Won
2013	2013 Best of Nollywood Awards	Best Actress In Supporting role English film	Finding Mercy	Won
2013	2013 Ghana Movie Awards	Best Actress - Africa Collaboration	Finding Mercy	Nominated
2013	2013 Golden Icons Academy Movie Awards	Best Actress Lead Role	Finding Mercy	Nominated
2013	2013 Nollywood Movies Awards	Best Actress in lead role	The Meeting	Won
2013	2013 Nigeria Entertainment Awards	Best Actress in Lead Role film	The Meeting	Won
2013	9th Africa Movie Academy Awards	Best Actress In a Leading Role	The Meeting	Nominated
2013	Africa International Film Festival	Special Jury Mention Award		Won
2013	ELOY AWARDS	Female Producer of The Year	The Meeting	Won
2014	2014 Nigeria Entertainment Awards	Best Actress In A Supporting Role	Finding Mercy	Nominated
2014	Nollywood Week Paris Film Festival	Best Film	The Meeting	Won
2014	2014 Best of Nollywood Awards	Best Supporting Actress English Film	The Meeting	Won
2014	2014 Golden Icons Academy Movie Awards	Best Actress Lead Role	Iyore	Won
2014	ELOY Awards	Movie Actress of the Year	Iyore	Nominated
2014	2014 Africa Magic Viewers Choice Awards	New Era Award	The Meeting	Won
2015	2015 Africa Magic Viewers Choice Awards	Best Actress In A Comedy	The Meeting	Won
2015	2015 Africa Magic Viewers Choice Awards	Best Movie Comedy	The Meeting	Won
2015	2015 Africa Magic Viewers Choice Awards	Best Actress in Drama/TV Series	Iyore	Nominated
2015	2015 Nigeria Entertainment Awards	Actress of the year (nollywood)	The Meeting	Nominated
2016	2016 Nigeria Entertainment Awards	Best Supporting Actress	Surulere	Nominated
2017	2017 Africa Magic Viewers Choice Awards	Best Actress - Drama/TV Series	76	Won
2017	Africa Movie Academy Awards	Best Actress In Leading Role	76	Nominated
2017	2017 Nigeria Entertainment Awards	Best Lead Actress In A Film	76	Nominated
2021	Africa Movie Academy Awards	Best Actress in a Leading Role	La Femme Anjola	Nominated
2022	Africa Magic Viewers' Choice Awards	Best Overall Movie	La Femme Anjola	Nominated

== See also ==
- List of Nigerian actresses
