= Pascal Amanfo =

Nigerian film director

- Born: March 31
- Occupations: Director, screenwriter

Pascal Amanfo is a Nigerian film director, based primarily in the Ghana film industry.

== Early life and education ==
Amanfo is a native of Awo Omamma in Oru East Local Government Area of Imo State, south-eastern Nigeria. His mother is from the Esan tribe of Edo State, south-south region of Nigeria.

== Career ==
In an interview on The Delay Show Ghana (2014), Amanfo described AMAA award-winning actor, Adjetey Anang as "every director's dream", particularly for his versatility and diligence to acting profession. In 2014, he was listed as one of the top Nigerian film directors by Pulse. In a 2014 interview with Vanguard (Nigeria), Nollywood actress, Sharon Francis described Amanfo as a mentor, who deserve the praise for his tutorship in her quest for stardom. Top Ghanaian actress, Yvonne Nelson speaking on being discovered by Amanfo, stated that he is "one of the top directors in Ghana" and has a way of making difficult situations seem effortless for crew members while on set. In 2011, Amanfo directed Single Six, starring Yvonne Okoro and John Dumelo. In 2013, Amanfo caused a cinematic stir in Nigeria and Ghana, when his film Boko Haram debut. The film was subsequently restricted by Ghanaian authorities and was a flop in Nigeria even though the title was changed to Nation under Siege. Amanfo released a trailer for Purple Rose (2014) that stars Nse Ikpe Etim. The film is surrounded on the life of an inquisitive journalist. In 2015, BellaNaija described Amanfo's If Tomorrow never Comes as a decent effort in comparison to his previous film. It praised the cinematography, visual effects and sound used in the film.

== Personal life ==
Amanfo is a practicing Christian. In 2015, he disclosed that he will be concentrating on living a life that pleased God.

== Filmography ==
- Sin city (2019)
- Bed of Roses (2011)
- Open Scandals (2010)
- Family Runs
- Stalemate (as producer)
- My Last Wedding (2009)
- Corporate Maid (2008)
- Single and Married (2012)
- Wanna Be (2012)
- Grave Yard (2011)
- House of Gold (film) (2013)
- Nation Under Siege (2013)
- Letters to My Mother
- The Mystery of Sex
- Purple Rose (2014)
- If Tomorrow Never Comes
- Trinity (2010)
- Boko Haram
- Husband Shopping (2014)
- If You Were Mine (2014)
- Stalmate
- Single Six (2011)
- 40 Looks Good on You (2019)

== Accolades ==
=== Ghana Movie Awards ===
- 2011 Ghana Movie Awards - Best Director (Bed of Roses) - nomination
- 2012 Ghana Movie Awards - Best Director (Single and Married) - won
- 2013 Ghana Movie Awards - Best Writing (House of Gold) - nomination
- 2013 Ghana Movie Awards - Best Production Design (House of Gold) - nomination
- 2014 Ghana Movie Awards - Best Director (Single, Married and Complicated) - nomination
- 2014 Ghana Movie Awards - Best Writing (Single, Married and Complicated) - nomination
- 2014 Ghana Movie Awards - Best Production Design (Single, Married and Complicated) - nomination
- 2015 Ghana Movie Awards - Best Director (If Tomorrow Never Comes) - nomination
- 2015 Ghana Movie Awards - Best Adapted or Original Screenplay (If Tomorrow Never Comes) - nomination

=== Golden Icons Academy Movie Awards ===
- 2012 Golden Icons Academy Movie Awards - Best Original Screenplay (Single Six) - nomination
- 2012 Golden Icons Academy Movie Awards - Best Director (Viewers' Choice) - nomination
- 2013 Golden Icons Academy Movie Awards - Best Director (House of Gold) - nomination

=== Africa Magic Viewers' Choice Awards ===
- 2014 Africa Magic Viewers' Choice Awards - Best Writer (Single and Married) - nomination

== See also ==
- List of Nigerian actors
- List of Nigerian film producers
- List of Nigerian film directors
