= Yvonne Nelson =

Ghanaian actress and entrepreneur (born 1985)

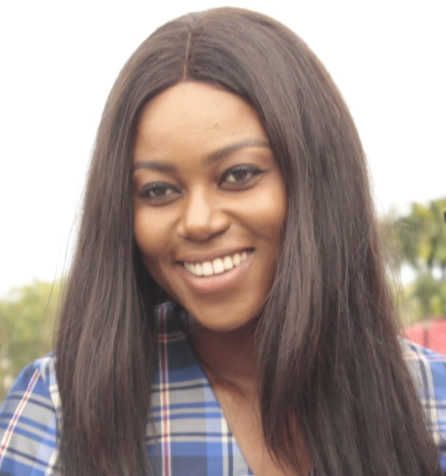
- Yvonne Nelson
- Born: 12 November 1985 (age 40); Accra, Ghana
- Education: Zenith University College and Central University
- Occupations: Actress, model, film producer and entrepreneur
- Years active: 2000–present
- Children: 1

Yvonne Nelson (born 12 November 1985) is a Ghanaian actress, model, film producer, author, entrepreneur and former Miss Ghana contestant. She has starred in several movies, including House of Gold (2013), Any Other Monday, In April, and Swings, Princess Tyra, and Playboy.

== Early life ==
Nelson was born in Accra, Ghana, and traces her roots back to Cape Coast. She is a descent of the Fante people. She remains the youngest of three siblings. Her mother is from Cape Coast in the Central Region while her father is from the Greater Accra Region. Her father abandoned the family when she was young. Nelson therefore grew up under the care of a single parent.

She started her education at St. Martin De Porres School in Accra, and then went to Aggrey Memorial Senior High School. She had her tertiary education at Zenith University College and Central University, where she did a degree course in human resource management. She graduated from the Ghana Institute of Management and Public Administration (GIMPA) with a master's degree in International Relations and Diplomacy in 2020.

== Career ==
Nelson, a former Miss Ghana contestant, accidentally began her career when she went to her favorite place to watch an audition. There, the producer asked if she would like to perform. He later acquired her number after she rejected the offer. She had her first big-screen roles in Princess Tyra in 2007 and Playboy in 2008.

She delved into movie production in 2011. Her first production was the movie titled The Price, which was released that same year. She also produced Single and Married in 2012 and House of Gold in 2013. The latter won Best Picture at the Ghana Movie Awards and Best Ghanaian Movie at the 2013 City People Entertainment Awards.

She started Heels and Sneakers, a television show centered on a group of young adults seeking happiness and the obstacles they face in pursuing education, employment, and marriage. The show started in 2018 and has two seasons.

On 31 July 2024, she opened the Yvonne Nelson International School.

== Books ==
On 18 June 2023, Nelson unveiled her controversial memoir, I Am Not Yvonne Nelson. The memoir was unveiled at Peduase Valley Resort, drawing support from numerous industry figures, friends, and media personnel in attendance.

Within 24 hours of its release, the book ranked among the best-selling titles on Amazon, being among the top twenty arts and entertainment biographies.

Nelson's memoir covers her attempts to learn the identity of her biological father, examines her relationship with her mother, and describes her experiences in acting, dating, and beyond.

The memoir details her secret involvement with rapper Sarkodie, including their sexual relationship, unplanned pregnancy, and its termination. She also wrote in her book that Nigerian musician Iyanya cheated on her with actress Tonto Dikeh.

== Personal life ==
On 29 October 2017, Nelson gave birth to a daughter, Ryn Roberts, with her ex-boyfriend, Jamie Roberts, a former British photographer. Nelson had remained silent about rumors of her pregnancy until she announced the birth of her daughter through a WOW magazine cover.

== Philanthropy ==
Nelson founded the Yvonne Nelson Glaucoma Foundation in 2010 to help create awareness about the disease. With support from other Ghanaian celebrities, she recorded an all-star charity single and shot a video to help educate people about glaucoma. As a result of her philanthropic activities particularly in glaucoma, she was honored by GoWoman Magazine and Printex.

== Campaign ==
On 17 May 2015, Nelson took it upon herself, together with other celebrities, to add more voices to the masses in protests against the energy crisis in her country. She led a peaceful vigil called DumsorMustStop on 16 May 2015. The hashtag #dumsormuststop is currently used on social media to amplify the concerns of Ghanaians with regard to the energy crisis. Nelson lamented the lack of development in Ghana since the country attained independence in 1957. She told the BBC in an interview that she ight consider running for political office in the future. She tweeted that she was looking forward to the day Ghanaians refuse to vote in presidential elections to send a message to politicians.

On 30 April 2024, Nelson asked the Ghanaian public to join her in a demonstration against the sitting government on the consistent dumsor (light outs) across the country.

On 8 June 2024, Nelson led the second vigil for the #dumsormuststop campaign against the government for the continuous lights out situation that the country continued to face despite the police effort to thwart the vigil.

== Recognition ==
In 2013, Nelson was honored by GoWoman Magazine and Printex for her efforts in setting up the Yvonne Nelson Glaucoma Foundation to fight the disease.

In 2018, Nelson was awarded a special award at the "MTN Heroes of Change" in recognition of her charity work in fighting glaucoma.

== Filmography ==
Nelson has featured in over 100 movies, including:

- 4Play Reloaded (2010) as Chloe
- Any Other Monday
- The Black Taliban
- Blood is Thick
- Classic Love
- Crime Suspect (2013)
- Crime to Christ (2007)
- Deadly Passion
- Deadly Plot (2012)
- Desperate to Survive (2010) as Tyra
- Diary of a Player
- Doctor May
- Fantasia
- Festival of Love
- Fifty Fifty
- Fix Us (2019) as Naadei Mills
- Folly
- Forbidden Fruit
- The Game (2010) as Shennel Johnson
- Girls Connection (2008) as Imelda
- Gold Diggin (2014) as Zara
- Golden Adventure
- Heart of Men (2009) as Tracy
- House of Gold (2013) as Timara Dan Ansah
- I Love Your Husband 3 (2009)
- If Tomorrow Never Comes (2016)
- In April (2016) as Arabah
- Keep My Love
- Kotoka
- Local Sense
- Losing You
- Love and Crises
- Love War
- Material Girl
- The Mistresses
- My Cash Adventure
- My London Diary
- My Loving Heart
- Obsession
- One Night In Vegas
- Passion of the Soul (2008) as Eve
- Plan B
- The Playboy (2008) as Wendy
- Pool Party (2011) as Audrey
- The Price (2013) as Rabbi
- The Prince's Bride
- Princess Tyra (2007) as Princess
- The Queen's Pride (2010)
- Refugees (2016) as Afua
- The Return of Beyonce (2006) as Yvonne
- Save the Last Kiss
- Save My Love (2010)
- Sin City (2019) as Julia
- Single and Married (2012) as Kimora
- Single, Married and Complicated (2014) as Kimora
- Strength of a Man
- Swings (2017)
- Tears of Womanhood (2009) as Khadija
- Threesome
- To Love and Cherish
- Trapped in the Game (2012) as chloe
- Who Am I
- Yvonne's Tears

== Awards and nominations ==
Year	Event	Prize	Recipient	Result
2008	4th Africa Movie Academy Awards	Best Upcoming Actress	Princess Tyra	Nominated
2009	Joy Nite Fm Awards	Stars Best Actress		Won
2010	2010 Ghana Movie Awards	Best Actress - Supporting Role	The Game	Nominated
2010	2010 Ghana Movie Awards	Favorite Actress	Herself	Won
2010	6th Africa Movie Academy Awards	Best Supporting Actress	Heart of Men	Nominated
2011	2011 Ghana Movie Awards	Best Actress - Supporting Role	4Play Reloaded	Nominated
2011	City People Awards	Best Ghanaian Actress		Won
2012	2012 Ghana Movie Awards	Best Actress	Single & Married	Nominated
2012	2012 Ghana Movie Awards	Best Picture-Africa Collaboration	Single & Married	Nominated
2012	2012 Ghana Movie Awards	Best Picture	Single & Married	Won
2013	2013 Ghana Movie Awards	Best Actress	The Price	Nominated
2013	2013 Ghana Movie Awards	Glitz Magazine Fans Favorite Actress	Herself	Won
2013	City People Entertainment Awards	Hottest Ghanaian Actress in Nollywood	Herself	Won
2014	2014 Ghana Movie Awards	Best Actress - Leading Role	Bachelors	Nominated
2015	2015 Ghana Movie Awards	Best Actress - Leading Role	If Tomorrow Never Comes	Won
2015	2015 Ghana Movie Awards	Best Picture	If Tomorrow Never Comes	Nominated
2015	2015 Ghana Movie Awards	Favorite Actress	If Tomorrow Never Comes	Nominated
2015	Glitz Style Awards	Most Stylish Movie Star	Herself	Won
2016	Ghana Movie Awards	Best Actress	In April	Nominated
2018	Ghana Movie Awards	Best Actress	Jungle Justice	Won
