= Chioma Chukwuka =

Nigerian actress and movie producer

Chioma Chukwuka - Akpotha
- Born: 12 March 1980 (age 46); Lagos State
- Education: Lagos State University
- Occupations: Actress, Filmmaker
- Years active: 2000–present
- Spouse: Franklyn Akpotha (m. 2006)
- Awards: 2007 Africa Movie Academy Awards for best Actress in a leading role. 2025 Africa Magic Viewers Choice Award for best actress in a leading role

Chioma Chukwuka// (born March 12, 1980, also credited as Chioma Chukwuka Akpotha or Chioma Akpotha) is a Nigerian actress, director and movie producer. In 2007, she won the Africa Movie Academy Award for "Best Actress in a leading role" for her performance in the movie Sins of the Flesh. In 2010, she won the Afro Hollywood award for "Best Actress in a lead role" . In 2023, She won An Africa International Film Festival Award (Afriff) For her performance in the popular first African Prime Video Movie, Gangs Of Lagos, In 2025, she won the Africa Magic Viewers Choice Award for "Best Actress in a leading role" for her performance in one of the most popular netflix series Seven Doors. She is one of the few african actresses to have won the major african movie awards, which are, Africa Movie Academy Award (AMAA) and Africa Magic Viewers Choice Award (AMVCA) including the Africa International Film Festival Award (AFRIFF).

== Early life ==
Chioma Chukwuka was born in Lagos State, on March 12, 1980. She hails from Oraifite in Ekwusigo Local Government Area of Anambra State, located in the southeast region of Nigeria. She completed her primary education at Onward Nursery and Primary School in Lagos State and then proceeded to Federal Government Girls College (FGGC) in Onitsha, Anambra State for her secondary education. Chioma then headed to Lagos State University, where she studied Banking and Finance.

== Career ==
Chioma Chukwuka's acting career began with her debut in the movie "The Apple" in 2000. Chioma also acted in the film The Handkerchief in 2000. In 2007, she received the "Best Actress in a Lead Role" award at the Africa Movie Academy Awards for the movie Sins of the Flesh. She was also nominated for the Africa Movie Academy Award for "Best Actress" in the movie "Accident" in 2014. With 20 years of experience, she has starred in more than 350 Nollywood movies, produced 6 movies and has many awards to her credit. As a film maker, Chioma has produced/co-produced over 8 movies including the award-nominated blockbuster On Bended Knees. Chioma Chukwuka is also a public speaker and mentor.

== Masterclass With Chioma ==
In January 2019, she announced the launch of a capacity-building platform called Masterclass With Chioma, where aspiring talents, especially actors, are taught by seasoned filmmakers, screenwriters, actors and other industry professionals on what it takes to make it in the film, TV, and theatre industries.

== Endorsement deals ==
Chioma Akpotha became the brand ambassador for Erisco Foods in November 2018. Chioma Chukwuka has served as a brand ambassador for a number of Nigerian and international commercial brands, including Globacom Nigeria, a telecommunications company, Royal Electronics, Omo Detergent Erisco foods, Stanel Company, Crown Premium Pasta, Terra Cubes, Harpic Cleaner.

== Personal life ==
Chioma Chukwuka married Franklyn Akpotha in 2006. She has three children. Since her marriage the actress has tried her best to keep her marriage and other personal details away from the spotlight. Regardless, the actress says her husband is wonderful and both of them are best friends. He supports her in the family and in her career.

== Filmography ==
=== As actress ===
- 2000: The Apple
- 2000: Three Musketeers
- 2000: Handkerchief
- 2002: Sunrise
- 2002: The Final Clash
- 2003: Cry No More - as Jane
- 2003: Disguise
- 2003: Handsome
- 2003: Real Love (part 1-3)
- 2003: Romantic Attraction
- 2004: Foul Play
- 2004: Unbroken Promise
- 2004: Two Become One
- 2004: Promise & Fail
- 2004: Legacy
- 2004: Home Sickness - as Chiamaka
- 2004: Heavy Rain - as Ateph
- 2004: Circle of Tears - as Carol
- 2005: War for War
- 2005: Years of Tears
- 2005: Sins of the Flesh – Chukwuka won the Africa Movie Academy Award in 2007 for Best Actress for her role in this movie
- 2005: Second Adam
- 2005: Sacred Tradition - as Ugomma
- 2005: Moment of Truth - as Evelyn
- 2005: Knowing You
- 2005: Golden Moon - as Nnenna
- 2005: Azima
- 2005: Fake Angel - as Jane
- 2005: Eagle's Bride - as Ugomma
- 2005: The Bridesmaid - as Eliza
- 2006: Wisdom of the Gods
- 2006: Zoza
- 2006: Traumatized - as Bianca
- 2006: Total Crisis - as Clara
- 2006: Tears in My Heart - as Lilian
- 2006: Strange Love
- 2006: Sound of Love - as Akwugo
- 2006: Serpent in Paradise
- 2006: Saviour - as Adaora
- 2006: The Saint
- 2006: Royal Insult
- 2006: Royal Doom
- 2006: Naked Sin
- 2006: On My Wedding Day - as Ngozi
- 2006: Last Dance - as Melisa
- 2006: Holy Family
- 2006: Games Men Play || Directed by Lancelot Oduwa Imasuen
- 2006: End of Discussion
- 2006: Desperate Ambition - as Lisa
- 2006: Dead in Faith - as Faith
- 2006: Chinwe Okeke
- 2006: Asunder
- 2006: Ass on Fire
- 2007: Battle for Battle- as Mariam
- 2007: Double Game
- 2008: Red Soil
- 2008: World Of Our Own
- 2008: Wind Of Sorrow
- 2009: Odum Na Akwaeke - Princess Akwaeke
- 2011: The Throne Is Mine
- 2011: Nne Ifedigo
- 2012: Cry No More
- 2013: On Bended Knees - as Kemi
- 2013: Finding Mercy - as Rita
- 2013: Accident - as Chy
- 2014: Heart Of Gold
- 2014: Warrior Sisters
- 2014: Aziza
- 2014: Sabina Makosa
- 2014: Magic Dragon
- 2014: Musical Whispers
- 2014: Unforgiven
- 2014: Police On Duty
- 2014: Village Commando
- 2014: Nwaogo The House Maid
- 2015: Agbaranze
- 2015: Ezi Nwa Di Uko
- 2015: Rain Of Hope
- 2015: Chinasa My Love
- 2015: Nwanyi Nnewi
- 2015: Kamsi The Freedom Fighter
- 2015: The Lioness
- 2015: Amarachi - as Amarachi
- 2015: Coffin Business
- 2015: Anelka
- 2015: Udu Bundle
- 2016: Rain Of Hope
- 2016: Evil Coffin
- 2016: Genesis Of Love
- 2016: The Flute Boy
- 2016: Marriage Crisis
- 2016: Sister Maria
- 2016: Akwaeke - as Akwaeke
- 2016: Wives On Strike - as Madam Vera _ Chioma was nominated at the Africa Magic viewers choice award for best actress in comedy for her role in this movie
- 2017: Evil Culture
- 2017: 2nd Coming Of Christ
- 2017: Innocent Murderer
- 2017: My Mother My Pain
- 2017: All For Love
- 2017: Heart of Ulimma
- 2017: King Uremma
- 2017: Reign Of Truth
- 2017: God Of Liberation
- 2017: My Mother
- 2017: Jehovah Witness
- 2017: Local Queen
- 2017: Somto
- 2017: Christmas Is Coming - as Lola Makinde
- 2017: Choked
- 2017: Bird Watcher
- 2017: Village Champion
- 2017: The Unforeseen Truth
- 2017: Dangerous Confession
- 2017: Innocent Murderer
- 2017: The Tradition
- 2017: Broken Vow
- 2017: Beyond Trust
- 2017: Tender Heart
- 2018: Sound of Wisdom
- 2018: Let Me Love You (part 1-2)
- 2018: Deeper Than Pain
- 2018: Desperate Twins
- 2018: In Love Again After Heartbreak (part 1-2)
- 2018: My Drum of Love (part 1-2)
- 2018: Life After Marriage
- 2018: Immortal Love (part 1-2)
- 2018: Cause for Love (part 1-6)
- 2018: The Ghost and the Tout - as Ejika
- 2018: Lara And The Beat - as Aunty Patience
- 2019: Void - as Mirabel
- 2019: For Want Of A Queen
- 2019: In Your Dreams
- 2019: The Street Kid
- 2019: Rain of LOVE
- 2019: Dark Cloud
- 2020: Nneka The Pretty Serpent - Chinonye Nzegwu Ejike
- 2020: Omo Ghetto: The Saga - as Chummy Choko _ Chioma was nominated at the Africa Magic Viewers Choice Award for best actress in a supporting role for her performance in this movie
- 2021: Collision - as Ekaete
- 2021: Charlie Charlie
- 2022: Single Not Searching - as Jumoke
- 2023: The Origin: Madam Koi-Koi - as Sister Silence, TV Series - 2 episodes
- 2023: Gangs of Lagos - as Mama Ify _ This movie is the first African original prime video movie and Akpotha Won an Africa International Film Festival Award For her Performance which trended on all social media platforms
- 2023: No Way Through - as Deaconess Rebecca
- 2023: Understanding Girlfriend
- 2024: Shining Star - as Endurance
- 2024: All of Us - as Ijeoma Benson
- 2024: Seven Doors - as Amaka _ Chioma Won the Africa Magic Viewers Choice Award For Best Actress in a leading role for her performance in this widely acclaimed netflix series

=== As producer ===
- 2013: On Bended Knees
- 2016: Cry of the Dead
- 2017: Choked
- 2017: Bird Watcher
- 2019: For Want Of A Queen
- 2019: In Your Dreams
- 2019: Rain of LOVE
- 2019: Dark Cloud
- 2025: When Love Spins
- 2026: A Thousand Little Pieces

== Awards and nominations ==
Year	Award Body	Category	Nominated work	Result
2007	Africa Movie Academy Award	Best Actress in a Leading Role	Sins of the Flesh	Won
2010	Afro Hollywood award	Best Actress in a Leading Role	Herself	Won
2012	Exquisite Lady of the Year (ELOY) Awards	Brand Ambassador of the Year	Harpic	Nominated
2013	Exquisite Lady of the Year (ELOY) Awards	Film Actress of the Year	On Bended Knees	Nominated
2013	Best of Nollywood Awards	Best Lead Actress in an English Movie	On Bended Knees	Nominated
2013	Golden Icons Academy Movie Awards	Best Drama	On Bended Knees	Nominated
2013	Golden Icons Academy Movie Awards	Best Cinematography	On Bended Knees	Nominated
2013	Golden Icons Academy Movie Awards	Best Actress	On Bended Knees	Nominated
2014	Exquisite Lady of the Year (ELOY) Awards	Brand Ambassador of the Year	Omo	Nominated
2014	Africa Movie Academy Award	Best Actress in a Leading Role	Accident	Nominated
2014	Golden Icons Academy Movie Awards	Best Actress	Accident	Nominated
2014	Nollywood Movies Awards	Best Lead Female	Accident	Nominated
2014	Nigeria Entertainment Awards	Best Actress in a Lead Role	Accident	Nominated
2014	City People Entertainment Awards	Best Actress of the Year (English)	Herself	Nominated
2015	City People Entertainment Awards	Best Actress of the Year (English)	Herself	Nominated
2016	City People Entertainment Awards	Best Actress of the Year (English)	Herself	Nominated
2017	Africa Magic Viewers' Choice Awards	Best Actress in a Comedy	Wives on Strike	Nominated
2018	Ghana-Naija Awards	Actress of the Year	Herself	Nominated
2022	Africa Magic Viewers' Choice Awards	Best Supporting Actress	Omo Ghetto: The Saga	Nominated
2025	Africa Magic Viewers' Choice Awards	Best Lead Actress	Seven Doors	Won

== See also ==
- List of Nigerian actors
- List of Nigerian film producers
- List of Nigerian film directors
