= Nollywood Reinvented =

Nigerian website

- Website type: Film review and forum
- Website: nollywoodreinvented.com
- Commercial: Yes
- Registration: Optional
- Launched: 22 January 2011
- Current status: Online

Nollywood Reinvented, also known simply as NR, is a Nigerian movie review website launched in 2011 by founder, Oge Ngonadi. It also provides information about films, actors, producers and other film people. It is one of the first review platforms dedicated to Nollywood. The website provides two major categories of movie reviews (cinematic reviews and home video reviews) as well as TV show reviews and ratings.

== History ==
Nollywood Reinvented's website was created on 22 January 2011. It was created to help improve the Nigerian Cinema presence on the internet as well as to serve as a reference for Nigerian movie viewers. With over 100 Nigerian and Ghanaian movies reviewed and counting, NR helps create a platform and reference for nollywood on the web.

The website is able to serve as a reference by providing ratings and reviews to the nollywood audience, these ratings include the critic ratings as well as audience ratings which provides an opportunity for side by side comparison. The website also helps to sort nollywood movies into categories according to genre and actors. NR also serves as a database to provide quick information (such as synopsis and production information) about nollywood movies on the web to the audience.

== #NRAwards ==
Nollywood Reinvented holds a yearly survey for films known as the NR Awards. The nomination phase usually begins in the month of June or July and viewers would be able to nominate individuals or films in various categories. Nomination period lasts for two to three months, before the commencement of the voting process, which will carry on until the end of November, and winners announced in December.

== See also ==
- Rating site
- YNaija
- Awakening
