= Annie Macaulay =

Nigerian, model, presenter and actress (born 1984)

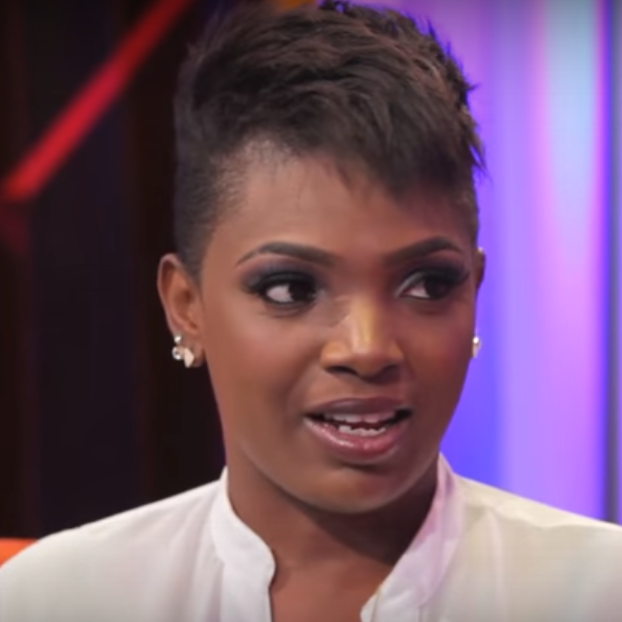
- 2014
- Born: 13 November 1984 (age 41); Nigeria
- Education: University of Lagos; Lagos State University
- Occupations: Actress; model; presenter
- Years active: 2009–present
- Spouse: Innocent Idibia (married 2012 - 2025)

Annie Macaulay (born 13 November 1984) is a Nigerian model, presenter, and actress. She was nominated for Best Supporting Actress at the 2009 Best of Nollywood Awards.

== Early life and education ==
Macaulay was born in Ibadan but is originally from Eket in Akwa Ibom State. She moved to Lagos State with her mother after the divorce of her parents. She holds a degree in computer science and theatre arts after completing undergraduate courses at Lagos State University and the University of Lagos, respectively.

== Career ==
Prior to the start of Macaulay's acting career, she competed at the "Queen of All Nations Beauty Pageant", where she was placed as a runner-up. She went on to feature in a cameo appearance on the music video of 2Baba's "African Queen" song.

Her Nollywood career came to the limelight for her role in the movies titled Pleasure and Crime and Blackberry Babes. She expressed her excitement on being featured on the cover of the March issue for Glamour South Africa magazine.

The Netflix African reality series Young, Famous & African, which premiered on 18 March 2022, included Macaulay and her ex-husband Innocent "2Baba" Idibia, as well as other African personalities like Shakib Cham Lutaaya, Diamond Platnumz, Naked DJ, Nadia Nakai, Swanky Jerry, Andile Ncube, and Kayleigh Schwark.

== Personal life ==
Macaulay was married to 2face Idibia with whom she has two children. She gave birth to her first child, a daughter Isabel Idibia, in December 2008 and her second, Olivia Idibia on 3 January 2014. She also owns a beauty salon in Atlanta called "BeOlive Hair Studio".Annie and 2Baba, who share two daughters, announced the end of their marriage in January 2025 after more than a decade together.

== Selected filmography ==
- First Family
- Pleasure and Crime (2010) as Steph
- White Chapel (2011) as Vivian
- Eight (2015)
- The Wanted Girl (2014) as Eva
- Blackberry Babes (2011) as Kimberly
- Return of Blackberry Babes
- Estate Runs
- Young, Famous & African
- Unconditional
- Obiageli The Sex Machine
- Morning After Dark (2014) as Servant
- Beautiful Monster (2014) as Servant
- Open Scar
- Secret Lovers
- Desires of Married Women
- Love Across (2021) as Dichie
- Almajiri (2022) as Hench Woman
- Married But Feminist (2023) as Caro

== Awards and nominations ==
| Year | Award ceremony | Prize | Result |
|---|---|---|---|
| 2009 | 2009 Best of Nollywood Awards | Best Supporting Actress | Nominated |
| 2016 | African Entertainment Legend Awards | Fast Rising Actress | Won |
