= 2015 Golden Icons Academy Movie Awards =

Awards ceremony

The 2015 Golden Icons Academy Movie Awards was the 4th edition of the ceremony. The event was held on October 17, 2015 in Houston, Texas. It was hosted by Nigerian comedian, Ayo Makun.

== Awards ==
=== Best Motion Picture ===
- Love Regardless
- Stalker
- Stigma
- Black November
- Trials of Igho
- Matters Arising

=== Best Film (Drama) ===
- Stigma
- The Changer
- Invasion 1897
- Ojuju
- Oge's Sister
- After the "I Do's"
- Stalker

=== Best Film (Comedy) ===
- Jack and Jill
- Headgone
- Horn Free Day
- My American Son
- Broni Wawu
- When Love Comes Around

=== Best Short Film ===
- Verdict
- Once
- The Throne
- Horn Free Day
- Henna

=== Best Film (Foreign Language) ===
- Mr Bf
- Torera
- Ojuju
- Made in Agege
- Iya Alalake

=== Best Actor ===
- Frederick Leonard – Keeping Secrets
- Hakeem Kae-Kazim - Black November
- Majid Michel - Matters Arising
- Jim Iyke - Stalker
- Mike Omoregbe - Invasion 1897
- Ken Erics - Trials of Igho
- Clem Ohameze - My American Son

=== Best Actress ===
- Adesua Etomi - Falling (film)
- Uche Jombo - Oge's Sister
- Ini Edo - While You Slept
- Mbong Amata - Black November
- Jackie Appiah - Stigma
- Nse Ikpe-Etim - Stalker
- Ruth Kadiri - Matters Arising

=== Best Supporting Male ===
- Anthony Monjaro - Stalker
- Desmond Finney - Reflections
- Seun Akindele - The Changer
- Chigozie Atuanya - Jafar
- Melvin Oduah - Trials of Igho
- OC Ukeje - Black November
- James Gardiner - Happy Deathday

=== Best Supporting Female ===
- Kiki Omeili - Sting
- Yvonne Jegede - Oge's Sister
- Caroline Danjuma - Stalker
- Ayo Adesanya - The Good Wife
- Venita Akpofure - While You Slept
- Tana Adelana - The Kingdom
- Eku Edewor - When Love Comes Around

=== Best Comedic Act ===
- Roselyn Ngissah - Jack and Jill
- Akpororo - Headgone co-winners
- Nkansah Kwadwo - Made in Agege
- Kelechi Udegbe - Horn-free Day
- Fathia Balogun - Iya Alalake
- Lydia Forson - A Letter from Adam
- Eniola Badmus - Headgone co-winners

=== Best New Actor ===
- Gbenga Titiloye - Love Regardless
- Stoneboy - Happy Deathday
- Jeff Kumordzi - Letter from Adam
- Akpororo - Headgone
- Kunle Oluremi - Sting
- Iso Paeley - Love Regardless

=== Best New Actress ===
- Aisha Kamara - Reflections
- Princess Okah - The Changer
- Yvonne Okyere - Love Regardless
- Rosemary Zimu - Champagne
- Emem Inwang - Stalker
- Comfort Idongesit - Trials of Igho
- Nsikan Isaac - The Banker

=== Best On-Screen Duo ===
- Ruth Kadri and Majid Michel - Matters Arising
- Ken Erics and Kiki Omeili - Trials of Igho
- Blossom Chukwujekwu and Adesua Etomi - Falling (film)
- Gbenga Titiloye and Zynnel Lydia Zuh - Love Regardless
- Nse Ikpe-Etim and Jim Iyke - Stalker
- Yvonne Jegede and Uche Jombo - Oge's Sister

=== Best Editing ===
- Kpians by Stanlee Ohikhuare
- When Love Comes Around
- Matters Arising by Nwaogburu Nelson
- Verdict by Stanlee Ohikhuare
- Ojuju by CJ Obasi
- Love Regardless by Muyiwa Aluko
- Black November

=== Best Sound ===
- Kpians by Stanlee Ohikhuare
- Invasion 1897
- The Throne by Keneth Ononeze
- Black November
- The Antique by Cobhams Asuquo and Darasen Richards
- Ojuju by Dayo Thompson
- Made in Agege by Kenneth Yeboah

=== Best Makeup/Costume ===
- Jafar by Nwagboso and Elechenu
- Ojuju by Adefunke Olowo
- Made in Agege by Evans, Yeboah & Poku
- Stalker by Udonquak
- Kpians by Edwin-Okon
- When Love Comes Around
- Invasion 1897

=== Best Cinematography ===
- Black November
- Ojuju
- Invasion 1897
- Verdict
- Horn-Free Day
- Shattered Romance
- Kpians

=== Best Screenplay ===
- Stigma
- Trials of Igho
- Shattered Romance
- Sting
- Headgone
- Requite
- Stalker

=== Best Producer ===
- Ojuju by Oge Obasi.
- Invasion 1897 by Lancelot Imaseun
- Headgone by Fasisi
- Black November by Jeta Amata
- Jafar by Ezugwu

=== Best Director ===
- Trials of Igho by Chris Eneng Enaji
- Invasion 1897 by Lancelot Imaseun
- Stalker by Moses Inwang
- Love Regardless by Muyiwa Aluko
- Black November by Jeta Amata
- The Changer by Ejim Fortune Kezi
- Headgone by Dare Fasisi

=== Best Film (Diaspora) ===
- Red Rose
- The Portrait
- Affairs of the Heart
- LAPD African Cops

=== Best Screenplay (Diaspora) ===
- Red Rose
- The Portrait
- Retaliation
- The Flaws
- Bloodline Battle
- Affairs of the Heart
- LAPD African Cops

=== Best Director (Diaspora) ===
- Affairs of the Heart by Robert Peters
- The Portrait by John Uche
- Bloodline Battle by AB Sallu
- Red Rose by Kingsley Ukaegbu
- LAPD African Cops by Pascal Atumah

=== Best Actor (Diaspora) ===
- Moses Efret - Red Rose
- Carl Payne - The Flaws
- Kyle Burgess - The Portrait
- Pascal Atumah - LAPD African Cops co-winners
- Joseph Benjamin (actor) - Affairs of the Heart co-winners

=== Best Actress (Diaspora) ===
- Oge Okoye - Red Rose
- Berlinda Nahbila - The Portrait
- Queen Esther Imar - Bloodline Battle
- Stella Damasus - Affairs of the Heart
- Pridin B. Fru - Retaliation

=== Best Male (Viewers Choice) ===
- John Dumelo
- Alexx Ekubo
- Van Vicker
- Uti Nwachukwu
- Blossom Chukwujekwu
- Majid Michel
- OC Ukeje

=== Best Female (Viewers Choice) ===
- Adesua Etomi
- Uche Jombo
- Belinda Effah
- Ruth Kadiri
- Ini Edo
- Yvonne Nelson

=== Best Comedic Act (Viewers Choice) ===
- Francis Odega co-winners
- Julius Agwu co-winners
- Funke Akindele
- Lydia Forson
- Eniola Badmus
- Roseyln Ngissah
- Akpororo

=== Foreign International Act (Male) ===
- Wyclef Jean - Black November
- Dorien Wilson - LAPD African Cops
- Akon - Black November
- Mickey Rourke - Black November

=== Foreign International Act (Female) ===
- Sarah Wayne Callies - Black November
- Luenell - LAPD African Cops
- Vanessa Bell Calloway - LAPD African Cops
- Kim Basinger - Black November

=== Lifetime Achievement Award ===
- Clarion Chukwura

=== GIAMA Song of the Year ===
- "Godwin" by Korede Bello
