= Heaven on My Mind (film) =

- Directed by: Uche Jombo
- Written by: Ojor Nneka
- Produced by: Nelson Jombo
- Starring: Mercy Aigbe; Ray Emodi; Chika Chukwu
- Cinematography: Dickson Godwin
- Production companies: Uche Jombo Studios; Minnie Empire Productions
- Release date: 2018
- Country: Nigeria
- Language: English

Heaven On My Mind is a 2018 Nigerian film directed and written by Nneka Ojor with Uche Jombo as co-writer.

== Plot ==
The film tells a story of a young man called Ben Peters who has taken marriage as a lifestyle and business transaction until he meets his right match called Heaven.

== Cast ==
- Adunni Ade as Heaven
- Femi Adebayo as Soji
- Mercy Aigbe as Bola Peters
- Ini Edo as Ivie Peters
- Ray Emodi as Ben Peters
- Swanky Jerry as Self
- Uche Jombo as Uju Peters
- Eric Ogbonna as P.I
- Princewill Kalu as John
- Chika Chukwu as Amaka
- Chidi Okereke as Ben's Friend
