= 2012 Golden Icons Academy Movie Awards =

Awards ceremony

1st Golden Icons Academy Movie Awards
- Date: 20 October 2012
- Hosted by: Jim Iyke
- Organized by: Golden Icons Magazine

The 2012 Golden Icons Academy Movie Awards was the maiden edition of the ceremony to reward excellence in African cinema. It was hosted by Jim Iyke.

== Awards ==
=== African Films Category ===
Best Motion Picture

- Unge’s War
- Man on Ground
- Somewhere in Africa
- Mr. and Mrs.
- Two Brides and A Baby
- I'll Take My Chances

Best Drama Film

- The Groom’s Bride
- In the Cupboard
- Kokomma
- Somewhere in Africa
- Two Brides and A Baby
- Enemy of the Family

Best Actor

- Majid Michel – Somewhere in Africa
- Jimmy Jean-Louis – Sinking Sands
- OC Ukeje – Two Brides and A Baby
- George Davidson – Dangerous Men
- Joseph Benjamin (actor) – Mr. and Mrs.
- Hakeem Kae-Kazim – Man on Ground

Best Actress

- Ini Edo – In the Cupboard
- Jackie Appiah – Deadly Affair
- Nse Ikpe Etim – Mr. and Mrs.
- Stella Damasus – Two Brides and a Baby
- Yvonne Okoro – Single 6
- Nadia Buari – Hands of Time

Best Comedy Act

- Ime Bishop Umoh - Okon Lagos
- Funke Akindele - Wisdom of Thomas
- Mercy Johnson - Dumebi
- Monalisa Chinda - Okon Lagos
- Lilian Bach - Eletan

Best New Actor

- Leo’ Uche – Unge’s War
- Uti Nwachukwu – In the Cupboard
- Bryan Okwara – I'll Take My Chances
- Bobby Michaels – Facebook Lovers
- Eddie Watson – Single 6
- James Gardener – The Groom’s Bride

Best New Actress

- Keira Hewatch – Two Brides and a Baby
- Nana Akua Amoah – Single 6
- Belinda Effah – Kokomma
- Zita Galega – Single 6
- Ama K. Abebrese - Sinking Sands
- Joy Orie (JJ Bunny) – Trapped in the Game

Best Supporting Actor

- Alex Ekubo – In the Cupboard
- Okey Uzoeshi – Two Brides and a Baby
- Van Vicker – Hands of Time
- Frank Artus – Trapped in the Game
- Leo U’Che – Dangerous Men
- Yemi Blaq – Sinking Sands

Best Original Screenplay

- Sinking Sands – Leila Djansi
- Unge’s War - GuGu Michael
- In the Cupboard – Desmond Elliot
- My Life, My Damage – Uche Jombo
- Two Brides and a Baby – Blessing Egbe
- Single 6 – Pascal Amanfo

Best Supporting Actress

- Chelsea Eze – Two Brides and a Baby
- Biola Segun Williams – In the Cupboard
- Yvonne Nelson – Trapped in the Game
- Martha Ankomah – Somewhere in Africa
- Lilian Ini Ikpe – Kokomma
- Chisom Oz Lee – Timeless Passion

Best Indigenous Film (native language)

- Unge's War
- Eletan
- Okon Lagos
- Idomo
- Kokomma
- Udeme Mi

Best Film Director

- Teco Benson - Two Brides and a Baby
- Tom Robson - Kokomma
- Frank Rajah Arase - Somewhere in Africa
- Desmond Elliot - In the Cupboard
- Van Vicker - Hands of Time
- Phil Efe Bernard - Deadly Affair

Best Film Producer

- GuGu Michaels – Unge’s War
- Kwame Boadu – Somewhere in Africa
- Emem Isong – I'll Take My Chances
- Chinwe Egwuagu – Mr. and Mrs.
- Abdul Salam Mumuni - The Groom’s Bride
- Blessing Egbe - Two Brides and Baby

Best Costume

- I'll Take My Chances
- The Groom’s Bride
- Somewhere in Africa
- Unge’s War
- Two Brides and A Baby

Best Sound

- Deadly Affair
- Sinking Sands
- Somewhere in Africa
- I'll Take My Chances
- Unge’s War
- The Groom’s Bride

Best Cinematography

- Unge's War
- Man on Ground
- The Groom’s Bride
- Sinking Sands
- Two Brides and a Baby
- Deadly Affair

GIAMA Humanitarian Award

- Omotola Jalade – Omotola Youth Empowerment (OYEP) Foundation
- Nana Ama Mcbrown – Nana Ama and The Mcbrown Family Foundation
- Van Vicker – Van Vicker Foundation
- Juliet Ibrahim – The Juliet Ibrahim Kidney Cancer Foundation (JIF)
- John Dumelo – John Dumelo foundation
- Monalisa Chinda – Monalisa Chinda Sunshine Foundation

=== Diaspora Films Category ===
Best Film – Diaspora

- Bianca
- Secret Past
- The Entrapped
- The Mechanic (Who is the Man)
- Black Money
- Paparazzi

Best Actress – Diaspora

- Sanu Kalu – Scarlet
- Divine Shaw – Black Money
- Maureen Esealuka – Bianca
- Amaka Morghalu – Faithfulness
- Syr Law – The Entrapped
- Seun Maduka – The Mechanic (Who is the Man)

Best Supporting Actress – Diaspora

- Susan Peters – The Entrapped
- Nancy Agyapong – DSK Unauthorized
- Charmaine Turpin – Bianca
- Summer Angel – Tears of my Joy
- Wins Tina Taylor – Scarlet
- Eefy Ify – The Mechanic (Who is the Man)

Best Actor – Diaspora

- Chet Anekwe – Bianca
- Van Vicker – Black Money
- Pascal Atuma – Secret Past
- Ramsey Nouah – Exposure
- John Dumelo – Scarlet
- Tchidi Chikere – When Heaven Smiles

Best Supporting Actor – Diaspora

- Olalekan Akintude – Black Money
- Oscar Atuma – The Mechanic (Who is the Man)
- Mohamed Bah – Secret Past
- Koby Maxwell – Paparazzi: Eye In The Dark
- Curtis John Miller – Grey Focus
- Mohamoud Arab - Tears of my Joy

Best Film Director – Diaspora

- Robert Peters – Black Money
- Ab Sallu – Secret Past
- John Uche – Bianca
- Pascal Atuma – The Mechanic (Who is the Man)
- George Kalu – Faithfulness
- Bayo Akinfemi – Paparazzi: Eye In The Dark

Best Film Producer – Diaspora

- Secret Past – Mohamed Bah, Susan Nwokedi
- Bianca – John Uche
- The Entrapped – Wendy Bangura
- The Mechanic (Who is the Man) – Pascal Atuma
- Paparazzi – Clarice Kulah/ Koby Maxwell
- Black Money – Chris Ikpefua

=== Viewers' Choice Categories ===
Best Male Act (Viewer's Choice)

- John Dumelo
- Ramsey Nouah
- Majid Michel
- Desmond Elliot
- Van Vicker
- Jim Iyke
- Mike Ezuruonye
- Yemi Blaq

Best Female Act (Viewer's Choice)

- Omotola Jalade
- Mercy Johnson
- Nadia Buari
- Genevieve Nnaji
- Uche Jombo
- Jackie Appiah
- Tonto Dikeh
- Ini Edo

Best Film Director (Viewer's Choice)

- Kunle Afolayan
- Frank Rajah-Arase
- Desmond Elliot
- Pascal Amanfo
- Tunde Kelani
- Teco Benson
- Phil Efe Bernard
- Tom Robson

Best Male Act – DIASPORA (Viewer's Choice)

- Tchidi Chikere
- Pascal Atuma
- Chet Anekwe
- Hakeem Kae-Kazim
- Oliver Mbamara

Best Female Act – DIASPORA (Viewer's Choice)

- Sana Kanu
- JJ Bunny
- Veeda Darko
- Seun Maduka
- Merlisa Determined

Best Male Act (Hollywood – Viewer's Choice)

- Idris Elba
- Samuel L. Jackson
- Denzel Washington
- Kevin Hart
- Will Smith
- Don Cheadle
- Isaiah Washington
- Djimon Hounsou

Best Female Act (Hollywood – Viewer's Choice)

- Meagan Good
- Kerry Washington
- Lynn Whitfield
- Queen Latifah
- Halle Berry
- Taraji Henson
- Princess Monique
- Sophie Okonedo

=== Special Categories ===
Lifetime Achievement Award

- Emem Isong

Honorarium Humanitarian Award

- Amobi Okoye

Music Achievement Award

- J Martins

Honorarium Appreciation Awards

- Van Vicker
- Uche Jombo
- Ini Edo
- Jim Iyke
- Kelly Hansome
- Pascal Atuma
