= Tanimola =

Nigerian given name

Origin
- Language: Yoruba
- Origin: Nigerian
- Meaning: Who knows tomorrow
- Region of origin: South-West Nigeria

Other names
- Variant form: Tanmola

Tanímọ̀la is a Nigerian name of Yoruba origin which means "Who knows tomorrow"? Tomorrow in this name means "future". Tanimola can be interpreted further to mean "Who knows the future".

== Notable people bearing the name ==
- James Tanimola Ayorinde, Nigerian Baptist minister
- Akpororo (Bowoto Jephthah Oluwatiseyifumi Tanimola), Nigerian stand-up comedian
- John Obaro (John Tanimola Obaro), Nigerian entrepreneur
