= Ogbodo =

- Gender: Male
- Language(s): Igbo

Origin
- Word/name: Nigeria
- Meaning: Entrance/gates

Ogbodo audio is a surname of Igbo origin in south eastern Nigeria.

== Notable people with the surname include ==
- Jeremiah Ogbodo (born 1991), Nigerian fashion stylist
- Uche Ogbodo (born 1986), Nigerian film actress and producer
