= Ayorinde =

Ayòrindé
- Gender: Male
- Language: Yoruba

Origin
- Origin: Nigeria
- Meaning: Joy walks in.
- Region of origin: South West, Nigeria

Ayòrindé is a Nigerian surname and given name. It is of Yoruba origin, and means "Joy walks in.". The diminutive forms include Ayọ̀rìndélémi which is in full form, meaning "Joy walked to my house." while the shorter form is Ayọ̀ which means "Joy". Notable people with the name include:

== Surname ==
- Ayorinde Oluwanifemi(born 1990), Engineer and CEO
- Deborah Ayorinde (born 1987), British Nigerian actress
- James Tanimola Ayorinde (1907-1970s), Nigerian minister
- Sam Ayorinde (born 1974), Nigerian footballer
- Steve Ayorinde (born 1970), Nigerian state commissioner

== Given name ==
Ayorinde Kehinde Okiki (born 1992), Nigerian disc jockey and record producer, known as DJ Kaywise
