= Ifeanyi Akogo =

Nigerian actor

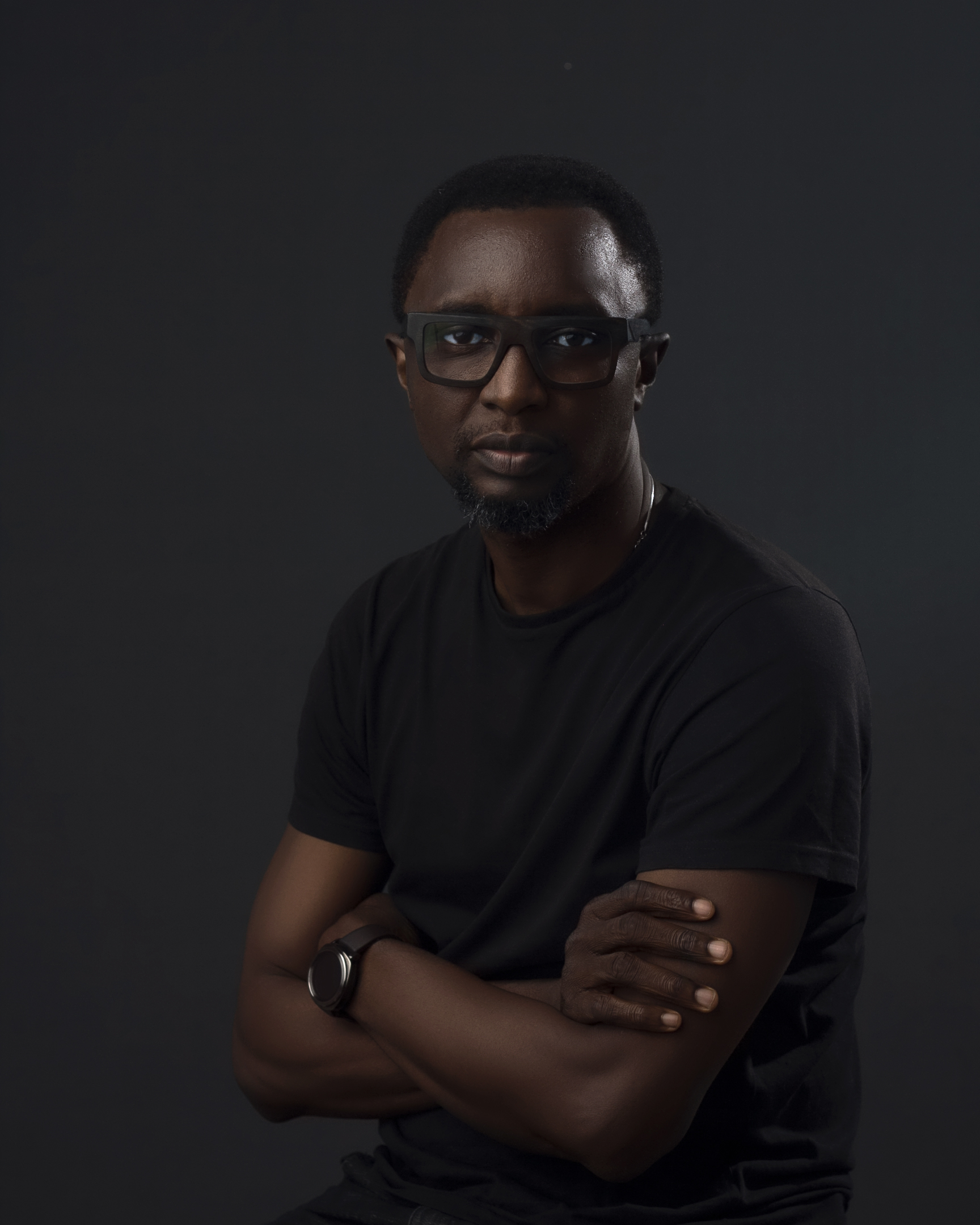
- Born: Ifeanyi Akogo; 24 July; Lagos State, Nigeria
- Education: Health Education, Delta State University
- Occupations: Actor; Radio Presenter
- Notable work: "Silence" 2022 The Cleanser (2021), The Wait (2021), Kamal (2020), Battleground (MNet 2017), Battleground - Final Showdown (MNet 2018), Eve (2018), Mourning Karen (2018), Ordinary People (2018), The Groom (2018), Facade (2017), The Bait (2017), Tinsel (MNet 2016), Living with Angel (2016), Crystal (2015), Tango (2008), Choices (2006), Music and Moments (99.3FM Nigeria Info)

Ifeanyi Akogo is a Nigerian actor and radio presenter.

== Early life and education ==
Akogo was born in Ebute Metta, Lagos State, Nigeria.

He attended Bright Star Primary School and Labo Memorial Primary School in Lagos, he also attended St. John's Secondary School, Lagos, and Baptist Boys High School, Abeokuta, Ogun State.

He studied Health Education at Delta State University, Delta State, Nigeria, and he has a Certificate in Entrepreneurial Management from Pan African University.

== Career ==
Akogo started acting in stage plays as an eight year old in primary school, and he went on to perform with various drama groups across Nigeria, during his primary and secondary school years.

In 2006, Akogo debuted in his first film as an actor in a movie titled Choices, where he played the role of "Barrister George". The movie was produced by Pastor Bimbo Odukoya of the Fountain of Life Church in Lagos, and directed by Don Pedro Obaseki. After Choices, he went on to play the role of "Omasola" in Tango, a 26-episode TV series that was also produced by the Fountain of Life Church.

He shot into limelight when he played the role of "Mr Midas" in Tinsel TV series on Africa Magic Television, showing in almost 50 African countries, and since then he has starred in various television, and film productions.

He recently played the role of "Boniface" in Mnet/Africa Magic TV series Battleground and Battleground - Final Showdown among other works.

He has been cast in primary roles alongside various actors in the Nollywood film industry, such as Richard Mofe-Damijo, Segun Arinze, Van Vicker, Gideon Okeke, Adesua Etomi, Femi Jacobs, Abiola Segun-Williams, Iyke Okechukwu, Ihuoma Linda Ejiofor, Lala Akindoju, Somkele Idhalama, Chiwetalu Agu, Jide Kosoko, Bolanle Ninalowo, Bolaji Ogunmola, Ayoola Ayolola among others.

== Filmography ==
Akogo has featured in various movies and TV series.

=== Television ===
He played the role of "Boniface" in Battleground and Battleground - Final Showdown (Mnet - Africa Magic)

He starred as "Mr Midas" on African Magic's Tinsel.

- Battleground - Final Showdown (2018)
- Battleground (2017)
- Living with Angel (2016)
- Tinsel (2016)
- Tango (2008)

=== Films ===
He played alongside Femi Jacobs in Tango, directed by Solomon Macauley, and Choices directed by Don Pedro Obaseki.

He was also in Crystal and Ordinary People, both directed by Desmond Elliot, The Cleanser by James Abinibi, Living with Angel by Ben Chiadika, The Bait by Rok Studios, Mourning Karen by Fehintola Olulana, Façade by Mahmoud Ali-Balogun, and Eve.

- The Cleanser (2021)
- The Wait (2021)
- Kamal (2020)
- Mourning Karen (2018)
- Ordinary People (2018)
- The Groom (2018)
- Eve (2018)
- Facade (2017)
- The Bait (2017)
- Crystal (2015)
- Choices (2006)

=== Radio ===
He is a Radio Presenter on 99.3 FM Nigeria Info where he hosts Music & Moments.

=== TV hosting ===
He is the host of the Lagos State Choir Awards.
