= Semwanga =

Semwanga is a surname. Notable people with this surname include:

- Edward Semwanga, Ugandan footballer
- Ivan Semwanga (1977–2017), Ugandan-born South African socialite
- Joseph Semwanga, Ugandan military officer
