= Ini Ikpe =

Nigerian actress

- Born: Ini Simon Ikpe; Akwa Ibom, Nigeria
- Occupation: Actress
- Years active: 2004 - Till Date
- Spouse: Hon Joe Etukudo

Ini Ikpe is a Nigerian actress. She began her film career in 2003, and has acted over 100 movies since that time. In 2012, she was awarded best supporting actress for the movie Kokomma. Kokomma received three nominations at the 9th Africa Movie Academy Awards, with Effah winning the award for Most Promising Actor for her comic role in the film. It was released on DVD in September 2012.

== Early life and education ==
Ini Ikpe is an Ibibio from Akwa Ibom state in the south-south part of Nigeria, not far from Calabar. Her mother was a teacher, and her father an Elder in Church. She had a strict upbringing as the fourth of six children, four girls, two boys. She attended Cornelius Connely College in Calabar for her secondary school alongside Ini Edo. She got into acting through her friend Ini Edo and Emem Isong.

== Career ==
Her acting career started in 2004 with her debut in Yahoo Millionaire. She was discovered by a producer at the audition she attended. Although her late father always told her not to act, when someone has passion for something, they can't stop it.

== Films ==
- The Greatest Sacrifice
- Unroyal Majesty (2020) as Queen
- Kokomma (2012)
- I'll Take My Chances (2011)
- Edikan (2009) as Idara
- Yahoo Millionaire (2007) as Stella
- Ekaette (2006) as Mrs. Essien
- Traumatised (2006) as Uche
- Games Women Play (2005) as Ada
- Masterstroke (2004) as Randy
