= Young, Famous & African =

African reality show

- Genre: Reality television
- Starring: Khanyi Mbau; Annie Macaulay-Idibia; Zari Hassan; Diamond Platnumz; Swanky Jerry; Andile Ncube; Naked DJ; Nadia Nakai; Kayleigh Schwark; 2Baba; Ini Edo
- Country of origin: South Africa
- Original language: English
- No. of series: 3
- No. of episodes: 16

Production
- Executive producers: Peace Hyde; Adelaide Joshua-Hill; Martin Asare Amankwa
- Producers: Urban Brew Studios; A POP Media
- Production location: Johannesburg
- Camera setup: Multi-camera

Original release
- Network: Netflix
- Release: 18 March 2022 – present

Young, Famous & African is an African reality television series on Netflix, starring African stars Khanyi Mbau, Ini Edo, Annie Macaulay-Idibia, Zari Hassan, Diamond Platnumz, Andile Ncube, Swanky Jerry, Naked DJ, Nadia Nakai, Luis Munana, Kayleigh Schwark, Shakib Cham Lutaaya, Fantana and 2Baba. The show focused on building careers, looking for love, and rekindling old flames of famous media personalities from South Africa, Zimbabwe, Nigeria, Uganda and Tanzania.

As Netflix's first African reality series, it premiered on 18 March 2022.

== Plot ==
The show follows a group of friends who are African entertainers and A-listers as they go about their lives having fun, flirting and fighting in Johannesburg, South Africa.

They hail from five African countries. South African actress and media personality Khanyi Mbau is the central character of the group who is in a relationship with a Zimbabwean businessman. Separated couple Diamond Platnumz from Tanzania and his ex-girlfriend, South African-based Ugandan businesswoman Zari Hassan navigate their post-separation relationship, moving on and co-parenting.

Nigerian model Annie Macaulay-Idibia and her musician husband 2Baba deal with issues of previous infidelity and restoration. Nigerian fashion stylist Swanky Jerry is another central character who often appears as a peacemaker in the group.

South African rapper Nadia Nakai who is in a long-distance relationship, and single guy and broadcaster Andile Ncube also feature as potential love interests of other cast members.

Twice-divorced South African Naked DJ and his footballer girlfriend Kayleigh Schwark go through the challenges of dating life and their 12-year age gap.

== Cast ==
- Annie Macaulay-Idibia
- Bonang Matheba
- Diamond Platnumz
- Swanky Jerry
- Zari Hassan
- Nadia Nakai
- 2Baba
- Khanyi Mbau
- Naked DJ
- Kayleigh Schwark
- Andile Ncube
- Luis Munana
- Ini Edo
- Kefilwe Mabote
- Fantana

Person	Season 1	Season 2	Season 3
Khanyi Mbau	Yes	Yes	Guest
Diamond Platnumz	Yes	Yes	Yes
Naked DJ	Yes	Yes	Yes
Zari Hassan	Yes	Yes	Yes
Swanky Jerry	Yes	Yes	Yes
Andile Ncube	Yes	Yes	No
Annie Macaluay	Yes	Yes	Yes
Nadia Nakai	Yes	Yes	Yes
Kayleigh Schwark	Yes	Yes	Yes
Fantana	No	Yes	Yes
Luis Munana	No	Yes	Yes
Bonang Matheba	No	Recurring	Guest
2Baba	Recurring	Recurring	Guest
Kefilwe Mabote	No	No	Yes
Shakib	No	No	Yes
Ini Edo	No	No	Yes

== Episodes ==
Series	Episodes	Originally released
1	7	18 March 2022
2	9	19 May 2023
3	8	17 January 2025

=== Season 1 (2022) ===
No. overall	No. in season	Title	Directed by	Original release date
1	1	"Welcome to South Africa"	Wesley Masilo Makgamatha	18 March 2022
Queen of bling Khanyi Mbau throws a ball for her friends; Diamond Platnumz's heartbreak emerges as he woos Nadia Nakai; parenting talk gets intense.
2	2	"The Newcomer"	Wesley Masilo Makgamatha	18 March 2022
Diamond hands the wheel to Nadia as they shop; Khanyi and Annie Macaulay-Idibia clash; Kayleigh Schwark spills about life with Naked DJ.
3	3	"Love Is in the Air"	Wesley Masilo Makgamatha	18 March 2022
Zari makes a splash at a soiree; Diamond gets called out by Naked, who spars with Khanyi; a loved one shows up.
4	4	"Bye, Bitch!"	Wesley Masilo Makgamatha	18 March 2022
African queens are on a collision course; Annie shares her joy, but Zari takes 2Face to the side; Andile Ncube assembles all his friends including his two baby mamas for a posh party.
5	5	"Faceoff"	Wesley Masilo Makgamatha	18 March 2022
Entanglements turn explosive, Zari confides in Khanyi, Annie gossips with Swanky and Nadia, and Andile makes time for love.
6	6	"Murder on the Blue Train"	Wesley Masilo Makgamatha	18 March 2022
Zari invites the squad on a luxury train trip; awkwardness -- and lions -- rattle the crew; Nadia has big news.
7	7	"Wedding Bells"	Wesley Masilo Makgamatha	18 March 2022
A lavish vow renewal approaches; the men shift gears for a speedy bachelor party while Swanky shakes up a tense bachelorette party.

=== Season 2 (2023) ===
No. overall	No. in season	Title	Directed by	Original release date
8	1	"Awkward Reunions"	Wesley Masilo Makgamatha	19 May 2023
9	2	"Masks Off"	Wesley Masilo Makgamatha	19 May 2023
10	3	"Diamonds are a Girl's Best Friend"	Wesley Masilo Makgamatha	19 May 2023
11	4	"The Queen B"	Wesley Masilo Makgamatha	19 May 2023
12	5	"Showdown"	Wesley Masilo Makgamatha	19 May 2023
13	6	"Oh Baby!"	Wesley Masilo Makgamatha	19 May 2023
14	7	"Trailer Proposal"	Wesley Masilo Makgamatha	19 May 2023
15	8	"Gloves Off"	Wesley Masilo Makgamatha	19 May 2023
16	9	"Trials and Tribulations"	Wesley Masilo Makgamatha	19 May 2023

=== Season 3 (2025) ===
No. overall	No. in season	Title	Directed by	Original release date
8	1	"Loves's in the air"	Wesley Masilo Makgamatha	17 January 2025
9	2	"Boundaries? Boundaries!"	Wesley Masilo Makgamatha	17 January 2025
10	3	"Showdown"	Wesley Masilo Makgamatha	17 January 2025
11	4	"Who Rules the Jungle?"	Wesley Masilo Makgamatha	17 January 2025
12	5	"Oh Baby!"	Wesley Masilo Makgamatha	17 January 2025
13	6	"Shots Fired"	Wesley Masilo Makgamatha	17 January 2025
14	7	"Something's Cooking"	Wesley Masilo Makgamatha	17 January 2025
15	8	"Breakups and Makeups"	Wesley Masilo Makgamatha	17 January 2025

== Production ==
On 22 June 2021, Netflix partnered with Urban Brew Studios and A POP Media to produce its first African original reality television series, Young, Famous & African. This landmark project became a defining moment for the continent, showcasing Africa’s vibrant talent to the world through the global platform of Netflix. Peace Hyde, one of the creators and executive producers of the show, reflected on how the series represents Africa’s bold step into the global spotlight. On 25 September 2021, Netflix premiered Young, Famous & African at Tudum: A Global Fan Event in Brazil, among 60 Netflix Originals.

On 14 February 2022, the official trailer was released on Netflix's YouTube channel. The show premiered on 18 March.

The third season premiered on January 17, 2025, with South African content creator Kefilwe Mabote, iconic Nigerian actress Ini Edo, and Ugandan boxer and entrepreneur Shakib Lutaaya joining the cast.

== Reception ==
=== Awards and nominations ===
Year	Award	Category	Recipient(s)	Result	Ref.
2022	African Entertainment Awards USA	Best Reality TV Shows	Young, Famous & African	Won	
2023	National Film & TV Awards South Africa	Best Reality TV Show	Young, Famous & African	Won	
2024	South African Film and Television Awards	Best Reality Show	Young, Famous & African	Won	
