= De9jaspirit Talent Hunt =

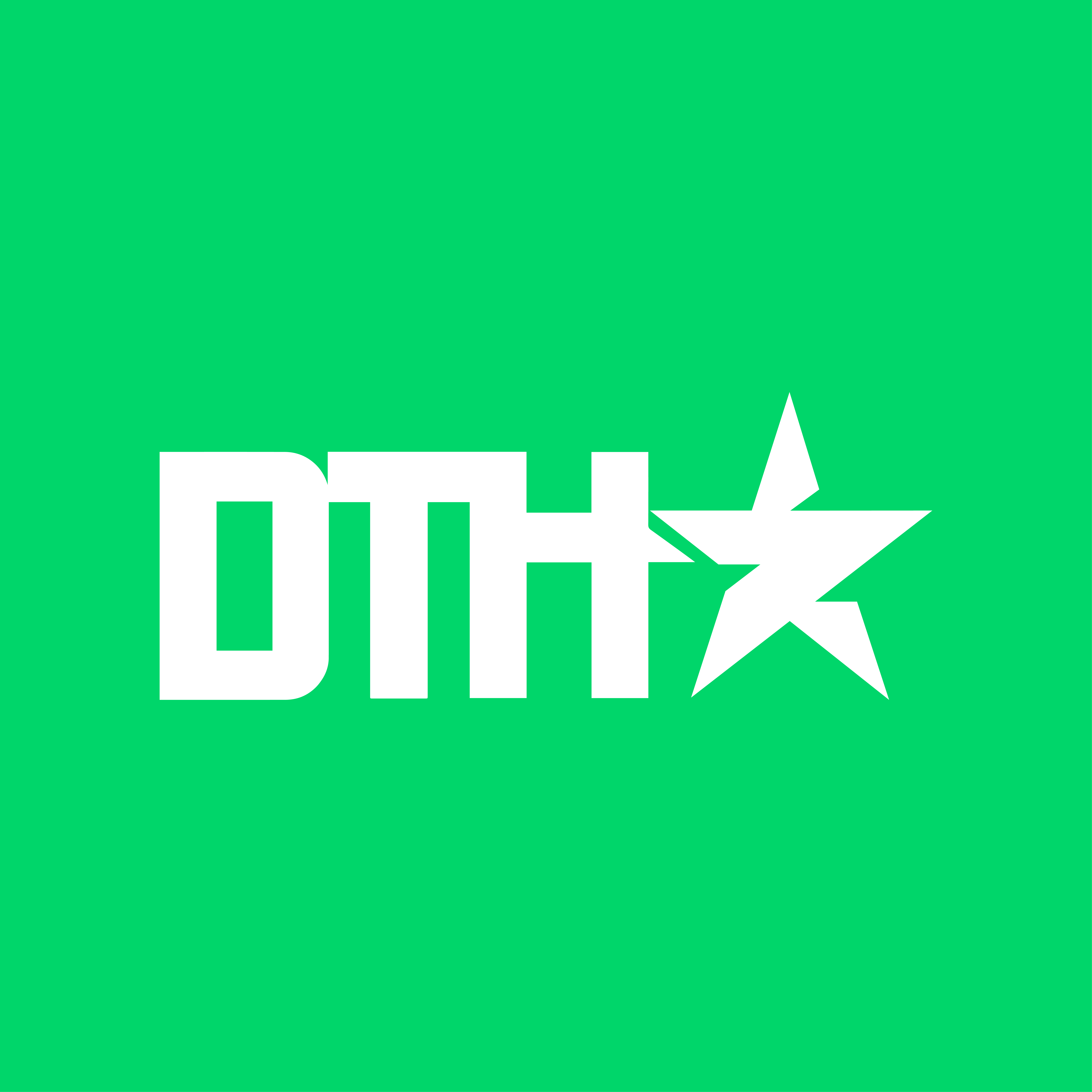
- Also known as: DTH
- Genre: Talent Hunt Show
- Presented by: VJ Adams
- Judges: Ini Edo, Dr Sid, IK Ogbonna, Liquorose Afije
- Country of origin: Nigeria
- Original language: English
- No. of series: 4

Production
- Production location: Calabar

Original release
- Network: Soundcity, Wazobia Tv, African Magic Family
- Release: 20 September 2021

De9jaspirit Talent Hunt is a Nigerian talent hunt show aimed at discovering, showcasing and celebrating talents in Nigeria. It was launched in 2021 and is now aired on television stations such as Soundcity, Wazobia TV and African Magic Family.

The maiden edition of De9jaspirit was hosted by Stephanie Coker and the season 2 was hosted by VJ Adams. The judges are Nollywood Actress Ini Edo, Nigerian Singer Dr Sid, Nollywood Actor IK Ogbonna, Comedian Buchi who has now been replaced with Big Brother Naija season 6 (Shine your eye) 1st runner up Liquorose Afije.

The current champion is The Global Poet, the first spoken word act to win the show

== Format ==
Registration fee is set for a fixed amount of 2,200 Naira. Contestants are asked to register online on the DTH mobile app and screened contestants will then be invited to participate in physical auditions which helps the organizers to screen the best 50 contestants to participate in the live show.

During the live show, each Judge has a DTH Royalty ticket. For any contestant to get the ticket they need to win the judges heart with an exceptional performance. The judges get to pick three to four contestants with the best performance of the week, which makes them eligible to compete for the DTH ROYALTY cash Price of 300,000 Naira.

The viewers and fans are allowed to vote for the best performance of the week from among the nominated contestants on the DTH App for free. The contestant with the highest number of votes will win the cash prize. This goes on every week for 10 Weeks. In the Finals of the competition, 60% of the votes comes from the Viewers/ fans and a unanimous decision from the judges make up the remaining 40%.

The current prize for the winner of De9jaspirit Talent Hunt is the sum of 10 million Naira, a five day all-expenses-paid trip to Kenya and Maldives, and a brand new car. The first runner-up gets a cash prize of 3 Million Naira, while the second runner-up gets two million Naira.

== Season 1 ==
The maiden edition of the De9jaSpirit Talent Hunt took place in September 2021. The Live show was hosted in Cultural Center in Calabar and it was aired on Soundcity and Wazobia TV. The show spanned seven days and was hosted by Stephanie Coker, a Nigerian on-air personality from EbonyLife TV and MTV Base Africa. Ini Edo, IK Ogbonna, Comedian Buchi and Dr. Sid were as judges. The competition recorded a total of 15,000 registrations nationwide and a total of 2,000 auditions, a diversity of contestants with talents ranging from contortions, magic, singing, dance, comedy, spray painting, freestyle rap and much more, the live show featured 50 contestants, and Miss Constance Olatunde, a remarkable singer, emerged winner and claimed the first prize of 10 million Naira. The Chrysolite Crew, a choreography group were the first runners-up, and they got a cash prize of three million Naira, Comedian Emmanuel Ikebudu, known for his stage name as "Slim Saint" got a cash prize of two million Naira.

The top five finalists were

Name	Stage Name	Act	Position
Constance Olatunde	Constance	Singing	Winner
The Chrysolite Crew	The Chrysolite Crew	Cheorography	First runner up
Emmanuel Ikebudu	Slim Saint	Comedy	Second runner up
Elvis Lunar	Elvis Lunar	Singing	Finalist
Ödeyeni Ifarinde	Auracle	Magician & Illusionist	Finalist

== Season 2 ==
The second season of De9jaspirit Talent Hunt started in August 2022 and lasted for three months. The Live show which held every Sunday for 10 weeks was hosted in Calabar and was aired on Soundcity and Wazobia TV. The show host was V.J Adams, a Nigerian musician, TV presenter and video jockey, replacing Stephanie Coker . The Judges were Ini Edo, Dr. Sid, and IK Ogbonna and newly introduced Liquorose who replaced Comedian Buchi.

During the season 2 Live show, Liquorose sitting as a judge walked out on two comedians who were contestants after they mocked her failed relationship with Big Brother Naija season 6 housemate, Emmanuel.

Esther Ugochi Kalu, known as “Ugee Royalty,” a gospel artist, emerged winner of De9jaspirit Talent Hunt season 2 and she was given a cash prize of seven million Naira and a fully-paid five-day trip to Dubai and Kenya. Ibukunoluwa Oluwaseun, known as “Ibquake”, a spoken word artist, emerged first runner up and she got cash prize of three million Naira. Bassey Stephen Ernest, known as “Masterseb Comedian,” emerged second runner-up spot with a cash prize of two million Naira. Also, the talent hunt awarded a weekly prize of 300 thousand Naira for outstanding performances during the three month show.

The top five finalists were

Name	Stage Name	Act	Position
Esther Ugochi Kalu	Ugee Royalty	Singing	Winner
Ibukunoluwa Oluwaseun	Ibquake	Spoken word artist	First runner up
Bassey Stephen Ernest	Masterseb	Comedy	Second runner up
Delta All-starz	Delta All-starz	Choreography	Finalists
King Sampson	Sampson	Saxophonist	Finalist

== Season 3 ==
De9jaSpirit Talent Hunt commenced registration for the 2023 Edition (Season 3) in June 2023. The first prize winner will get a prize of 10 million Naira cash, a 5-day trip to Kenya and Maldives (all expenses covered), and a brand-new car. The first runner-up will get a cash prize of 3 million Naira, while the second runner-up will get a cash prize of two million Naira.

The organisers of the show have stated that they will continue the DTH Royalty cash prize of 300 thousand Naira to contestants whose performances are voted as the best each week. The show will unfold through various stages, with contestants progressing based on public voting.

De9jaspirit announced that it will retain all four judges from last season and host VJ Adams.

The season 3 of De9jaspirit Talent Hunt was moved to Calabar International Convention Centre which is bigger than the previous venue with 3,000 capacity, the live show which kick started on the 29th of August 2023 and lasted for 10 weeks witnessed a record attendance of 3,000 people during weekly performances and 5,000 people at the grand finale, it was aired on Soundcity TV. The show host still remained VJ Adams and all four judges from the previous season were retained with Reekado Banks and Real Warri Pikin coming in as guest judges.

Exoduz Dance crew emerged winners of the season 3. The three person dance crew consists of Goodluck Imeh Thomas (the leader), John Joseph Akpan, and the audience favourite six-year-old Chikambo Annabel Obioma. They got a cash prize of 10 million Naira, a brand-new car, and an all-expense paid trip to Kenya and the Maldives.

The first runner-up was the singer Bisiryu Abraham Adeyemo, popularly known by his stage name, Mollythevibe. He got a cash prize of three million Naira. The 2nd runner-up was another crowd-favourite, Promise Effiong, He got a prize of two million Naira.

Season 3 of DTH was very popular amongst viewers and caused a significant stir on various social media platforms, getting the attention of lots of Afro-culture blogs and Celebrities like Taraji P. Henson, Chris Brown, Tiffany Haddish, Diamond Platnumz and Psquare as they took to their social media handles to repost and root for their favourite contestants at the show.

The top five finalists were

Name(s)	Stage Name	Act	Position
Goodluck Imeh Thomas; John Joseph Akpan; Chikambo Annabel Obioma	Exodus Dance Crew	Dancing	Winner
Bisiryu Abraham Adeyemo	Mollythevibe	Singing	First runner up
Promise Effiong	Promise Effiong	Singing	Second runner up
Elechi Miracle; Onyeakaruru Obinna; Ndudi Chekwube Ndudilichi; Ugwu Chigozie Emmanuel; Chukwudi Favour Nnamani	Clouded Moves	Dancing	Finalist
Abbey Ebio	Abbey	Singing	Finalist

== Season 4 ==
De9jaSpirit Talent Hunt returned for season 4 with an upgraded total cash prize of 40 million naira. The first prize winner will take home 30 million naira in cash, while the first and second runners-up will walk away with 7 million naira and 3 million naira respectively. Weekly winners will also receive 500,000 naira each, an upgrade from last season’s 300,000 naira. This season will be aired on Soundcity and African Magic weekly from September through November.

Winners

Name(s)	Stage Name	Act	Position
Deborah Johnson	The Global Poet	Spoken Word/Poetry	Winner
Jeremiah Oluwajenyo	JeremiahFJ Sax	Saxophone	First runner up
Christian Victor Eshiet	Chris Vic	Singing	Second runner up

=== Campus audition ===
In a bid to deepen grassrot engagements and scout emerging talents from across Nigeria, the first ever campus audition tour was introduced. Live auditions was held in University of Port Harcourt, University of Abuja, University of Benin, University of Lagos, IMT Enugu all in July. The winning contestant from each campus received 500,000 naira cash prize. After the tour, the five campus winners will battle for a 2 million grand cash prize, awarded to the contestant with the highest number of votes over a two-week free voting period on the app.

=== New judge ===
All judges and the host for the last edition are retained except for Dr Sid who will not return this season due to scheduling conflicts, after serving for 3 seasons since the inception of DTH he has been replaced by Vector Tha Viper.
