= Abiola Segun-Williams =

Nigerian actress

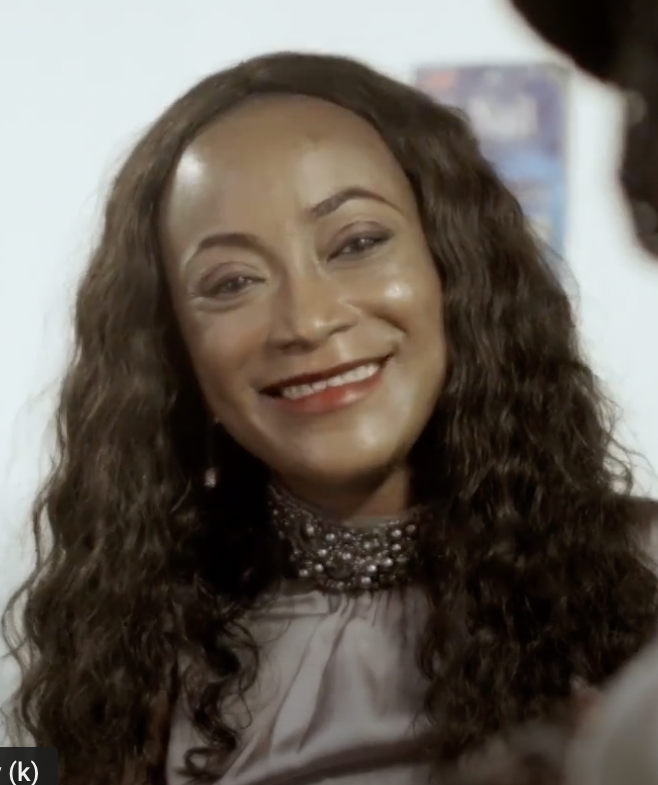
- Born: Lagos, Lagos State, Nigeria
- Citizenship: Nigerian
- Education: theatre Arts from Obafemi Awolowo University
- Occupations: Actress, Presenter, and Scriptwriter
- Years active: 1986–present

Abiola Segun-Williams is a Nigerian actress, TV presenter, and scriptwriter best known for her role as Titi K in the TV soap opera, Tinsel.

== Early life ==
Segun-Williams was born and raised in Lagos. She finished her secondary education in 1983 and studied theatre arts at the Obafemi Awolowo University, Ile Ife.

== Career ==
Segun-Williams became a professional actress in 1986. Her first acting role was a stage play titled Remilekun Jankarino by Ben Tomiloju in 1986. While in school, she started acting to earn a living. She featured in multiple stage plays, which showed in Lagos, Ibadan, Jos and Kaduna, among other places. She has gone on to feature in multiple productions such as In the cupboard by Desmond Elliot, I will take my chances produced by Emem Isong and Damages with Uche Jombo. She presented a show called Adam and Eve for five years on NTA.

== Filmography ==
=== TV shows ===
- Palava
- Neighbour Neighbour

=== Films ===
- Holding Hope (2010) as Mrs. Badmus
- In the Cupboard (2012) as Ronnie
- Forgetting June (2013) as Mrs. Graccia
- Finding Mercy (2013) as Angela
- Baby Shower (2016)
- The Patient
- The Paternity
- Diary of A Crazy Nigerian Woman (2017) as Joke Williams
- God Calling (2018) as Doctor
- Miracle (2019)
- Isio (2021)

== Personal life ==
Segun-Williams is married with two children. She suffers from scleroderma.

== See also ==
- List of Nigerian actors
