= Peace Hyde =

Ghanaian media personality

- Born: London, UK
- Education: Psychology
- Alma mater: Middlesex University
- Years active: 2013 — present
- Known for: Young, Famous & African
- Notable work: Foundation of Aim Higher Africa

Peace Hyde is a British-Ghanaian television producer, TV host, creator, journalist, and education activist. She is the creator and executive producer of Netflix's first African reality TV series Young, Famous & African, as well as the Head of Digital Media and Partnership and West African correspondent at Forbes Africa. She is the founder of Aim Higher Africa, a non-profit focused on improving the quality of education in impoverished communities across Africa. In 2019, she was awarded the African Social Impact Award at the House of Parliament, House of Commons in the UK.

== Early life and education ==
Hyde was born and raised in London, where she resided until 2015 before moving to Ghana. In her early years in London, she briefly practiced as a child psychologist before embarking on a career as a science teacher specialising in physics, chemistry and biology.

Hyde is an alumna of Middlesex University, where she obtained a degree in psychology.

== Career ==
Hyde holds positions as the head of Digital Media and the West African Correspondent at Forbes Africa.

Hyde's work as a journalist has been featured in Black Enterprise, Huffington Post, Ebony and Fox News. She was included in the United Nations' list of Most Influential People of African Descent list for 2017 and 2018. Hyde serves as a judge for the CNBC All Africa Business Leaders Awards, The Chivas Venture Fund, and the Veuve Clicquot Business Woman Award.

=== Education activism ===
Hyde founded the non-profit organisation called Aim Higher Africa with the aim of empowering the next generation of entrepreneurs and change-makers in Africa.

In 2018, Hyde launched a skills acquisition center in Yaba, Nigeria, providing free education and skills training for start-ups.

=== Media entrepreneurship ===
Hyde served as the creator and executive producer of the first ever African reality TV series on Netflix, Young, Famous & African. Hyde has created, produced, and hosted two talk shows: Forbes Africa's My Worst Day with Peace Hyde (3 seasons), where she interviews Africa's billionaires, and Against the Odds (2 seasons) on CNBC Africa's Forbes Woman Africa segment.

Hyde has also worked as a producer for the Vice News documentary Inside Nigeria's push to end police brutality. She has hosted her own talk show, Friday Night Live, which ran for 4 seasons as well as the music talent competition MTN Hitmaker in Ghana for three seasons.

Hyde was named to the United Nations' Most Influential People of African Descent list for 2017 and 2018. She was among the 200 Inaugural Obama Foundation Africa Leaders, having been shortlisted by President Barack Obama from a pool of 30,000 African leaders in 2018.

=== Public speaking ===
Hyde has been invited to speak at the Flourish Africa Conference, which was organised by Folorunso Alakija. Hyde has also been a speaker at TEDxAccra, TEDxKumasi, Global Social Awards in Prague, Essence, Africa 2018 Forum in Egypt, Social Media Week Lagos, and Hustle in Heels London.

== Awards and recognition ==
Year	Event	Prize	Result
2015	People's Choice Awards	Female News Presenter of the Year	Nominated
2015	RTP Awards	Television Female Entertainment Show Host of the Year	Nominated
2015	Young CEO Business Summit	Young CEO Global Award	Won
2015	Avance Media Awards	Top 50 Most Influential Young Ghanaians	Won
2016	Nigerian Broadcaster Merit Awards	Female African Broadcaster of the Year	Won
2016	Women For Africa Awards	International Business Woman of the Year	Nominated
2016	Women For Africa Awards	Business Woman of the Year	Nominated
2016	The African Network of Entrepreneurs	Top 100 Most Outstanding Women Entrepreneurs in Ghana	Won
2016	Women For Africa Awards	Judges Special Recognition Award	Won
2016	Africa Boku Talent Africa Awards	Excellence In Journalism Award	Won
2016	Waislitz Global Citizen Award	Global Citizen Awards	Nominated
2017	Discovery Young Health Journalist of the Year Award	Young Upcoming Health Journalist Award	Nominated
2017	Sanlam	Journalist Award	Nominated
2017	Mipad	100 Most influential people of African Descent	Won
2017	Ghana Naija Showbiz Awards	Winner Radio/TV Personality	Won
2017	Discovery Awards	The Discovery Young Health Journalist of the year	Nominated
2018	Nigerian Teen Choice Awards	Choice Media Personality of the Year	Won
2018	Obama Foundation	Obama Foundation Leaders Africa Fellow	Won
2019	Africa Social Impact Award	Africa Achievers Award	Won
2019	Global Social Awards	Social Impact and Change	Finalist
2021	African Growth Story	Sanlam Awards for Excellence in Financial Journalism	Won
