= Aim Higher Africa =

Nonprofit organization operating in Africa

- Abbreviation: AHA
- Formation: January 2013; 13 years ago
- Founder: Peace Hyde
- Founded at: Accra, Ghana
- Type: Nonprofit organisation
- Legal status: Charity
- Purpose: Educational, humanitarian
- Headquarters: East Legon, Accra, Ghana
- Region served: Africa
- Key people: Peace Hyde (Founder); Portia Gana (Head of communication); Adams Abayema Subur (Fundraising manager); Martina Yeboah (Student relationship officer); Israel Delike (Media officer); Mawuena Emmanuel (Web Master)
- Website: www.aimhigherafrica.com

Aim Higher Africa or AHA is a nonprofit organisation operating out of Africa formed in January 2013. The organisation focuses on enriching the standard of education by incorporating the use of information and communications technology in the learning environment, and training and developing young entrepreneurs in Africa to help bridge the gap between poverty and prosperity.

== History ==
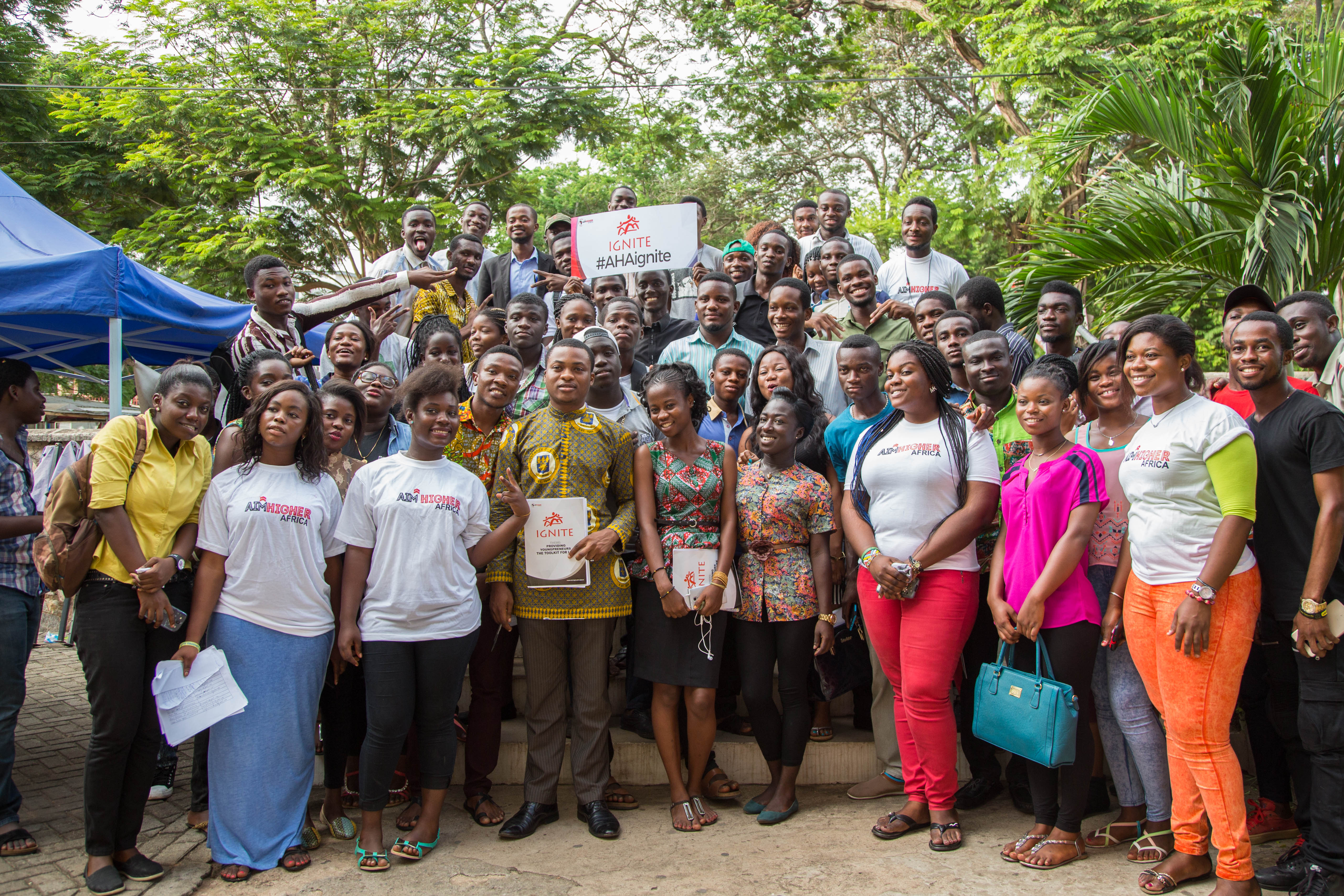
An event of AHA.

Aim Higher Africa was founded by British-Ghanaian Media Entrepreneur Peace Hyde in 2013 as an organisation focused on bringing education to impoverished communities.[4] The early days of the charity was spent on the streets of Accra, Ghana introducing street kids to basic literacy and numeracy classes. Over the years, the organisation has grown to offering full-scale training and development for both individuals and organisation. In 2014, the organisation launched its women empowerment campaign. To date, the organisation has reached over 2 million students and created 300 businesses. In 2017, the organization created its proprietary curriculum, The Mind-set Reorientation and Design Thinking curriculum (MRDT), which incorporate positive mental reinforcement with Design Thinking methodology to help entrepreneurs to discover moneymaking opportunities.

== Overview ==
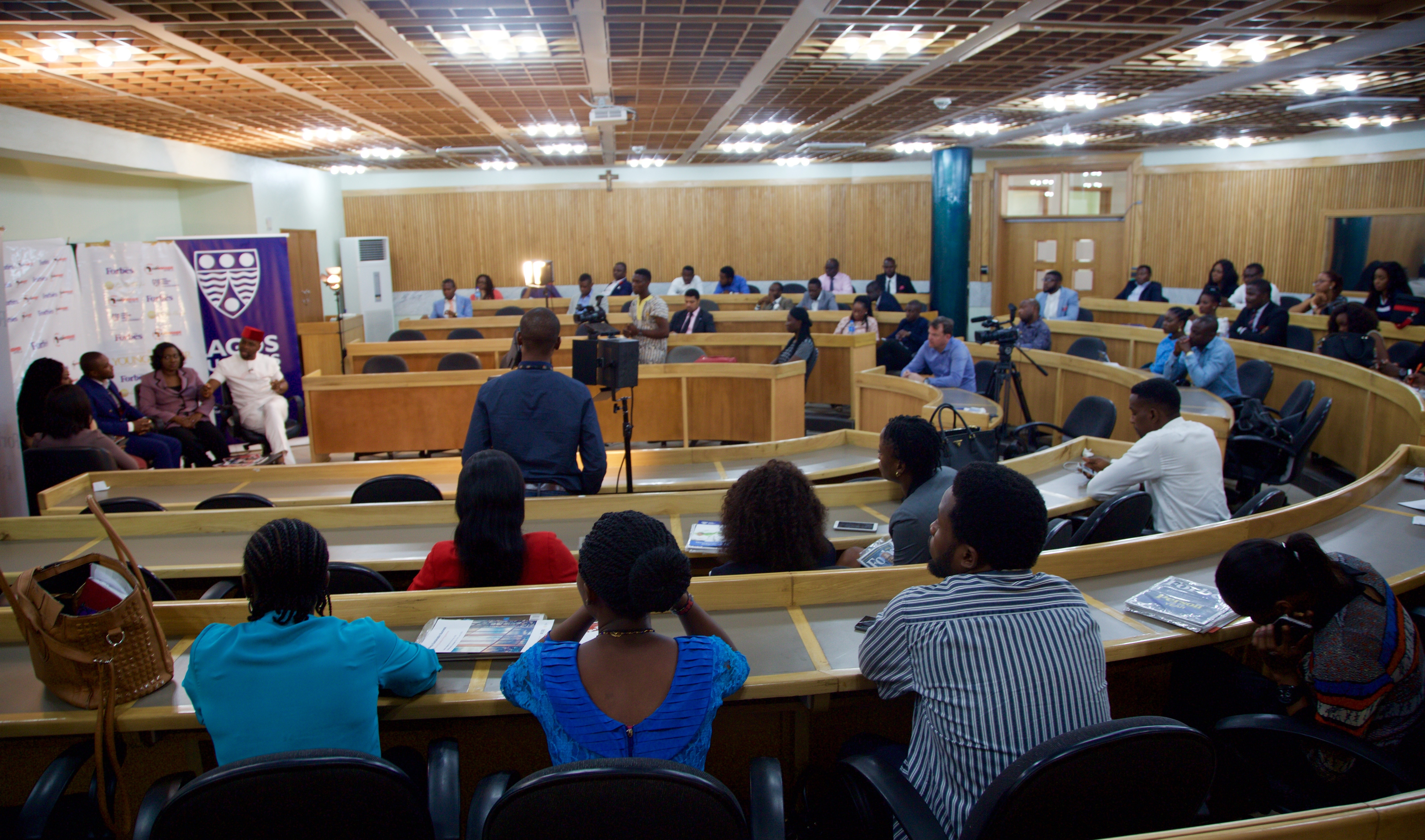
AHA conference.

Aim Higher works with a team of 10 specialists working remotely in the UK, US, Ghana, Kenya, Nigeria and South Africa. Mission of the organisation is to end the growing youth unemployment in Africa. They support and invest in each stage of education, providing IT support in education and services to governments, institutions, and teachers and directly to individual learners. The organisation raises money through donations, legacies, community fundraising, events and corporate partnerships.

== Campaign ==
=== Ignite ===
Ignite project provides entrepreneurial training to young entrepreneurs so that they can start their own business.

=== More Than a Woman ===
More Than A Woman campaign is a women's empowerment initiative, recognising the achievements of exceptional women in Africa.

=== Aim Higher Africa Skills Training Centre ===
In 2018, the organization opened its skills acquisition centre in Yaba, Logos. The center trains unemployed youths and grassroots entrepreneurs as well as startups through its Mind-set Reorientation and Design Thinking Curriculum (MRDT) to build scalable and sustainable businesses.

== Partnerships ==
Aim Higher Africa has partnerships with NASCO Electronics, Forbes Africa, Forbes Woman, and CNBC Africa.

== Awards and recognitions ==
Year	Event	Prize	Result
2015	Young CEO Awards	Young CEO Global Award	Won
