= Girls Cot =

- Directed by: Afam Okereke
- Produced by: Sylvester Obadigie
- Starring: Genevieve Nnaji, Rita Dominic and Ini Edo
- Release date: 2006

Girls Cot is a 2006 Nigerian movie produced by Sylvester Obadigie and directed by Afam Okereke.

== Cast ==
The movie stars;

- Alloy Amaefule as Chief Harrison
- Genevieve Nnaji as Queen
- Rita Dominic as Alicia
- Uche Jombo as Bella
- Edet Festus as Paul
- Innocent Nwafor as Chief Williams
- Tony Goodman as Vice President
- Kalu Collins as Ezekiel
- Robert Loner as Pascal
- John Baba Onipe as Capone
- Prince Sunny Ofia as Doctor
- Andy Obiekwe as Musa
- Sunny Ralph as Alhaji Sule
- Ini Edo as Eve.

== Synopsis ==
The movie depicts the struggle of university girls to keep up with life by faking their existence. The lead character had to lie that she is a daughter of the vice president, and she moved with big people that eventually led to series of problems.

== Cast reunion ==
Thirteen years after the production of the movie, the four leading actresses held a reunion to celebrate the production of the movie. The reunion was attended by celebrities such as Dbanj, Stephanie Okereke-Linus, Osas Ighodaro, Najite Dede and others.
