= VJ Adams =

VJ adam's
- Born: Adams Ibrahim Adebola; 5 May 1988 (age 38); Ejigbo, Lagos State, Nigeria
- Education: University of Lagos; BBC Academy
- Occupations: Video jockey; TV host; Rapper; musician
- Years active: 2008–present
- Musical career
- Genres: Hip Hop; afropop

Adams Ibrahim Adebola (born 5 May 1988), popularly known as VJ Adams, is a Nigerian video jockey, television presenter, entrepreneur, musician cum executive producer. His journey into limelight came after he contested at the 2008 edition of Next Movie Star West Africa. Adams is a presenter on Soundcity TV, a Nigerian music channel based in Lagos. He co-anchored the official red carpet at the 8th Africa Movie Academy Awards with Nollywood actress Alex Okoroji and co-anchored 2014 edition of the City People Entertainment Awards ceremony which was held in Lagos.

== Growing up and education ==
Adams is a native of Ogun State. He finished his basic and secondary school education at Teammate Children School, Isolo and Lagos State Civil Service Senior Model College, Ikorodu respectively before proceeding to the University of Lagos where he studied Civil Engineering. He holds a certificate in journalism after undergoing training in journalism at the BBC Academy, an educational arm of the British Broadcasting Corporation.

== Career ==
=== TV presenter ===
After contesting at the 2008 Next Movie Star show, Adams was made the lead presenter of Excite on TV in 2009 until 2010 when he resigned. On 22 February 2010, he joined Consolidated Media Associates, a media firm that houses TV shows including Soundcity TV, Spice TV, ONTV, Televista and VillageSquare TV. In 2022 he was announced host of De9jaspirit Talent Hunt show which is aired on Soundcity and Wazobia Tv. He also hosted Naija Star Search which is aired on StarTimes.

=== Music ===
Adams collaborated with Ice Prince, Sound Sultan, and Splash to release a single title "Winner". On 2 February 2014, he featured HarrySong on a song titled "Whazup", a song which received massive airplay and positive reviews. On his debut album, he worked with Oritse Femi, Chidinma, M.I, Pasuma, and Reminisce.
