= Ruth Kadiri =

Nigerian actress, screenwriter and film producer

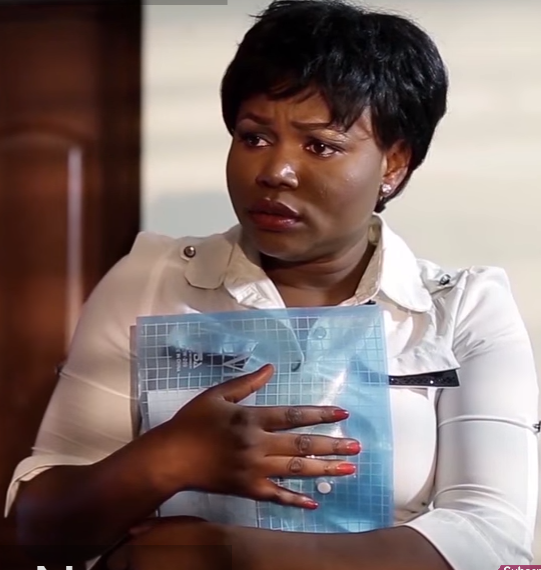
- Kadiri in the 2016 Nigerian film First Class
- Born: 24 March 1988 (age 38); Benin City, Edo State, Nigeria
- Education: University of Lagos; Yaba College of Technology
- Occupations: Actress; screenwriter; film producer
- Years active: 2005–present
- Children: 2

Ruth Kadiri (born 24 March 1988) is a Nigerian actress, screenwriter, and film producer.

== Early life and education ==
Ruth Kadiri was born on 24 March 1988 in Benin City, Edo State, Nigeria. She was the first child of two children; her father's name is Desmond Kadiri. She studied mass communications at the University of Lagos and business administration at Yaba College of Technology.

== Career ==
Kadiri ventured into Nollywood in the movie Boys Cot and since then has over fifty movies to her credit. As a screenwriter, Kadiri has written and co-written several movies, including Matters Arising, Heart of a Fighter, Ladies Men, Sincerity, First Class, and Over the Edge. Ruth also produced films such as Matters Arising, Over the Edge, Somebody Lied and Memory Lane, which deals with the issue of lies and deceit.

== Personal life ==
In December 2017, Kadiri announced that she was engaged on social media. On August 26, 2019, she gave birth to her first child. On July 20, 2022, she gave birth to her second child.

== Filmography ==
- Mercy the Bus Driver (2012) as Onyi
- Airline Babes (2012) as Maureen
- Brazilian Hair Babes (2013) as Silver
- Tears in My Heart (2013) as Nene
- Matters Arising (2014) as Ogor
- Unspoken Truth (2014) as Rebecca
- The Pains of Chimamanda (2015) as U.K.
- Miss Taken (2015) as Ruby
- First Class (2016) as Charity
- Memory Lane (2016) as Gina
- In Your Arms (2017)
- Black Bride (2017)
- Gateman (2017) as Frances
- We Cheats More (2017) as I.T.
- WET by Ruth Kadiri (2018) as Sharon
- Tripod by Ruth Kadiri (2018)
- Black Men Rock (2018) as Becky
- Sex & Love (2018) as Christy
- Love Is Beautiful (2019)
- Tender Lies (2019) as Blessing
- Unfounded (2019)
- Murder Call (2019) as Isabella
- Stab (2019) as Olivia
- The Final List (2019) as Idara
- The Dumb Wife (2020)
- Too Old for Love (2020)
- Tears of Rejected Seed (2020)
- Babies and Friends (2020) as Funbi
- Too Old for This (2020) as Lycia
- Shrine Girl (2020)
- Space Out (2020) as Toria
- Larry Cold (2021) as Precious
- Pair (2021) as Shade
- Adunni (2021)
- Taking Chances (2021) as Nurse Angela
- Love Me (2021) as Oreoluwa Jegede
- Craving (2021)
- 5 Is Company (2021) as Josephine
- Out of Love (2021) as Tejiri
- Nasty Jane (2021) as Janelle
- House Boy Wanted (2021) as Joan
- Boiling Point (2021) Roli
- Everybody Wants Alvin (2022) as Funke
- Breakfast (2022)
- Something Fishy (2022) as Toke
- Honey We Are Broke (2023) as Lucy
- Hot Mess (2023) as Marie
- Alaye (2024) as Catherine
- Perfect Nobody (2024) as Idia
- Trading Your Heart (Food For Thought) (2025) as Rebecca

== Awards and nominations ==
Year	Event	Category	Result	Ref
2015	Nigeria Entertainment Awards	Actress of the Year	Won	
2015	Golden Icons Academy Movie Awards	Best Female Viewers Choice	Nominated	
2015	Golden Icons Academy Movie Awards	Best On-screen Duo (with Majid Michel)	Nominated	
2015	Golden Icons Academy Movie Awards	Best Actress	Nominated	
2018	City People Movie Award	Best Actress of the year	Won	
2018	City People Movie Award	Face of Nollywood	Nominated	
2019	Ghana Movie Awards	Best Movie African Collaborations	Nominated	
2019	Ghana Movie Awards	Best Actress African Collaboration	Nominated	
2020	Best of Nollywood Awards	Best Supporting Actress – English	Nominated	

== See also ==
- List of Nigerian film producers
