= Akpororo =

Nigerian Comedian and Gospel Singer

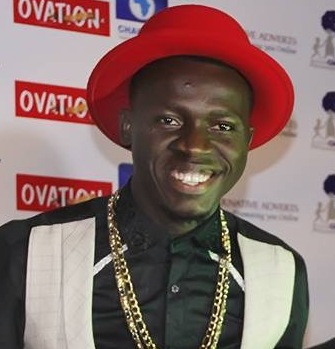
- Born: Bowoto Jephthah Oluwatiseyifumi Tanimola
- Occupations: stand-up comedian, vocalist and actor

Bowoto Jephthah Oluwatiseyifumi Tanimola, popularly known as Akpororo, is a Nigerian stand-up comedian, vocalist and actor.

== Early life and career ==
Akpororo is a native of Ilaje, Ondo State, southwest Nigeria but he was born and brought up in Warri, a city in Delta State, south-south Nigeria where he had his early education. His career started off as a local gospel musician until 2008, when he went into the National Comedy Challenge by Opa Williams, and went on to win the Calabar zone of the competition.

In 2009, Akpororo moved to Lagos and contested twice in the AY's Open Mic Challenge, coming second in his first try and winning the competition in his second try. He rose to popularity in 2013 following his performance at "Basketmouth's Laff and Jam" show and went on to perform in several comedy shows including "AY Live". He is 5 ft, 7 inches. On 12 August 2014, he staged his first major comedy show "Akpororo vs Akpororo" at the Shell Hall, MUSON Centre. The maiden event saw the attendance of notable musical acts and comedians.

In 2014, Akpororo delved into acting, starring in the films Headgone and The Antique; with the former earning him three nominations at the 2015 Golden Icons Academy Movie Awards.

== Artistry ==
His style of comedy is basically the fusion of secular and church-related jokes. In an interview, he revealed that he performs and cracks jokes about lunatics because he was once an attendant to mentally-ill people who came to the church he was attending for spiritual healing.

== Endorsement deals ==
In June 2015, he signed a 2-year endorsement deal with telecommunication company Airtel Nigeria.

== Awards and nominations ==
Year	Award ceremony	Prize	Result	Ref
2016	2016 Nigeria Entertainment Awards	Best Comedy Act	Nominated	
2016	2016 Africa Magic Viewers Choice Awards	Best Actor in a Comedy	Nominated	
2015	2015 Nigeria Entertainment Awards	Comedy Act of the Year	Nominated	
2015	2015 Golden Icons Academy Movie Awards	Best Comedic Act	Won	
2015	2015 Golden Icons Academy Movie Awards	Best New Actor	Nominated	
2015	2015 Golden Icons Academy Movie Awards	Best Comedic Act (View's Choice)	Nominated	
2014	2014 Nigeria Entertainment Awards	Comedy Act of the Year	Nominated	
2014	2014 BEN Television Awards	Comedian of the Year	Nominated	
2014	2014 Naija FM Comedy Awards	Best Comedian of the Year	Won	

== Personal life ==
He is married to Josephine Ijeoma Abraham, following their wedding in Surulere, Lagos State on 14 November 2015. He is a student of Lagos State University where he is studying Sociology.

== See also ==
- List of Nigerian comedians
- List of Yoruba people
- Tanimola
