= Wendy Bangura =

Sierra Leonean actress, film producer, author and entrepreneur

Wendy Hancil Bangura
- Born: Wendy Bangura
- Occupations: Actress; Film producer; Author; Entrepreneur
- Known for: The Entrapped (2012)
- Website: wendyhbangura.com

Wendy Hancil Bangura is a Sierra Leonean actress, film producer, author and entrepreneur.

== Early life ==
Bangura was born in her native Sierra Leone to a Sierra Leonean father and a mother of Indian and Lebanese descent.

== Career ==
=== Acting ===
She was the producer of the 2012 film, The Entrapped, in which she was also a cast alongsides Nollywood's Desmond Elliot who directed the film and others such as Syr Law, Illya Konstantin, Susan Peters and Emmanuel Mensah. For this film, she was nominated in the "Best Film Producer – Diaspora" category in the 2012 Golden Icons Academy Movie Awards.

She was featured in the 2014 Cameroonian film, The Greedy Realtor, directed by El Vis (VIS 3K) and produced by Benedette Keyi Jeff. Other cast include: Blaise Christian Sitchet, Clara Fernaldo, Ralph Maunello and others.

=== Writing ===
She is the author of the 97 paged book, Tears, Trials, and Triumphs.

== Filmography ==
Year	Film	Role	Notes	Ref.
2014	The Greedy Realtor	Actress		
2012	The Entrapped	Actress (Allison); Executive producer	Action, Drama, Romance	

== Accolades ==
Year	Event	Prize	Recipient	Result
2012	GIAMA	Best Film Producer – Diaspora	Herself	Nominated
