= I'll Take My Chances =

2011 film by Desmond Elliot

- Theatrical release poster
- Directed by: Desmond Elliot
- Screenplay by: Anthony Kehinde Joseph; Bola Aduwo; Uduak Isong
- Story by: Emem Isong
- Produced by: Emem Isong; Ini Edo
- Starring: Ini Edo; Bryan Okwara; Sam Loco Efe; Jide Kosoko; Abiola Segun Williams; Ini Ikpe; Ashleigh Clark
- Cinematography: Giuseppe Pugliese
- Edited by: Victor Ehi Amedu
- Music by: Victor Ehi Amedu
- Production companies: Royal Arts Studios; Ancient Digit Media
- Distributed by: Royal Arts Academy
- Release dates: 24 September 2011 (Uyo premiere); 24 February 2012 (Nigeria)
- Running time: 101 minutes
- Country: Nigeria
- Languages: English; Ibibio

I'll Take My Chances is a 2011 Nigerian dance romantic drama film, produced by Emem Isong and directed by Desmond Elliot. It stars Ini Edo and Bryan Okwara in lead roles, with Sam Loco Efe, Jide Kosoko, Ini Ikpe, Ashleigh Clark and Abiola Segun Williams in supporting roles. The film's synopsis says: "Tradition demands that a troubled young woman take the position of priestess of the land or else allow calamity to befall the village. She refuses to accept her fate and is further convinced not to heed custom's call by a handsome stranger".

The film premiered in Uyo, Akwa Ibom on 24 September 2011, before its general release on 24 February 2012 and was met with generally mixed to negative critical reviews. It received five nominations at the 2012 Golden Icons Academy Movie Awards, winning the award for "Best Costume", and also got three nominations at the 2012 Best of Nollywood Awards, receiving the award for "Best Edited Movie".

== Plot ==
Ikechukwu and his girlfriend, Giselle, travels to Lagos from the United States to set up a dance group, they are however met with disappointments after attending several auditions without being selected. IK is posted to the village of Ikot-Uyai for his NYSC, with the hope that he'll work his redeployment back to Lagos in a few weeks, but his request is however refused. Idara, a village girl, enjoys dancing so much; her father, Chief Ekene takes her to the priest, concerned about her behaviour with the suspicion that she might be possessed. The village priestess eventually reveals that Idara must become the next priestess of the village, lest calamity would befall the entire village.

Ikechukwu (IK), now serving in a village starts attending traditional dancing sessions; he meets Idara, masked at one of the sessions and he is fascinated by how good she dances. Using a veil Idara dropped while dancing, IK meets Idara once again, but Idara is quite hostile towards him. After much persistence, Idara gives in, and becomes IK's friend. IK and Idara fall in love with each other, as IK's relationship with Giselle becomes strained.

While dancing, Idara grows unconscious and she's taken to the shrine; she gives up to fate, deciding to obey the customs and become a priestess, but IK tries to convince her otherwise, to no avail. With the help of Giselle, IK finally gets his redeployment letter back to Lagos, and he convinces Idara to tag along, and go against the customs. Her father is strongly against the decision, while her mother only want what's best for her daughter. Idara eventually decides to follow IK to Lagos; the village priestess, along with her crew tries to hypnotize her at the car park, but IK carries Idara into the vehicle and they zoom off.

Giselle notices a difference in IK's behaviour and she soon realizes IK and Idara's unusual closeness at a dance rehearsal. IK asks that Idara become the new lead, but Giselle blatantly refuses. Giselle later catches Idara and IK kissing. A plague breaks out in Ikot-Uyai and people start dropping dead. It is believed that the gods are angry, and Idara now has to go back and obey the custom of the land for the people to be saved. Idara goes back to the village, but still can't pull through with the rituals and returns to Calabar to join the other dance crew at a major competition. The village priest prophesies that Idara would die before 4pm of the day due to her disobedience. The prophecy however doesn't come to pass and Idara's crew wins the dance competition. It is revealed at the epilogue of the film that the deaths of the villagers was caused by the poisoned fertilizers given to the villagers by a senatorial candidate, and not due to Idara's disobedience.

== Cast ==
- Ini Edo as Idara
- Bryan Okwara as Ikechukwu Okereke
- Ashleigh Clark as Giselle
- Sam Loco Efe as Chief Ekpene
- Jide Kosoko as Minister
- Ini Ikpe as Idara's mother
- Abiola Segun-Williams
- Moses Armstrong as Administrator
- Ekene Nkanga as Chief Priest

== Production ==
I'll Take My Chances was the biggest film to come out of Royal Arts Academy production house in terms of budget and production inputs at the time of its release. The producer had always wanted to make films centred on dance, which was her specialization in school, but had not found the right script. She states: "This project is one that is dear to my heart". The Canadian dancer Ashleigh Clark was flown in from the United States solely for the purpose of this film. Most of the film was shot on location in Akwa Ibom. According to Isong, the cast and crew received considerable love and support from the community while shooting the film. Other shooting locations included Lagos and some areas of Cross River. The film was one of the last shot by Sam Loco Efe, who died before its release; it was dedicated to him as a result.

== Release ==
A preview of I'll Take My Chances was unveiled to the public on 8 May 2011. The film was premiered in Uyo, Akwa Ibom on 24 September 2011. Emem Isong revealed that the decision to premiere the film in Akwa Ibom was due to the fact that the film was mostly shot there and that it presents the culture of the area as a backdrop to the story; so it was "a show of solidarity with the good people of Akwa Ibom". September was also fixed for the premiere, because it is the month in which Akwa Ibom state was created. The premiere featured a short documentary on the late Sam Loco Efe who starred in the film, but died before its release. The film had its Lagos premiere on 24 February 2012, before going on a general theatrical release. The two halls used for the film screenings at the Lagos premiere was reportedly jam packed, that some people who wanted to see the film at all costs had to stand and some sat on the cinema floors. The ushers at the event were dressed in Akwa Ibom native outfits. The film was also screened across two cities in Italy, a non traditional market.

== Reception ==
=== Critical reception ===
The film received mixed to negative critical reviews. Nollywood Reinvented gave it a 37% rating, noting the directing as a major setback for the film. It commended Ini Edo's performance, citing her as the "person who held it all together", but faulted Bryan Okwara's acting skills and panned Ashleigh Clark's performance. It praised the dance sets and concluded by stating, I'll Take My Chances "was a good story. It had a beginning, had an end, had a conflict. The film has a couple things that might not settle well with the viewers. But then, looking at the movie as a STORY! I was not entertained. If I seek to extract the story from the ruins of the movie, then yes it would have been a 5 out of 5, but if I look at the film as a story, which is what a film is intended to be, then it does not live up to expectations". Victor Olatoye of Nollywood Critics commended the music and dance choreography, but described the screenplay as "average", commenting: "I’ll Take my Chances melded fantastical sequences with quasi-vérité visuals, brisk editing and urban grime. It also addressed issues like career choices, local beliefs, politics, falling in love and Parenting, while celebrating the glorious dancing images of youth in full creative flower". He gave 3 out of 5 stars and concluded: "I’ll Take My Chances ends up been decidedly average drama but with decent dance numbers". Wilfred Okiche of YNaija believes that the fault in the film lies within its conception through execution, commenting: "Desmond Elliot is at the helm and while his direction is smooth and exciting at some points, the clunky screenplay defeats him. It moves at a leaden pace, does not quite know what to do with itself and becomes stuck in limbo between the both genres it attempts to conquer". While he praised visuals of the film which capture the beautiful scenery of Akwa Ibom, he talked down on Ini Edo's performance and concluded: "Like all movies from the Royal Arts Academy stable, an unnecessary and untidy sub-plot is introduced and it leads to an ending that is clumsily tied together. As it stands now, brilliant young filmmakers are stepping up big time and even the old ones are upping their game and reinventing themselves. For the continued relevance of Royal Arts Academy, they need to do a lot more than I'll Take My Chances. We deserve better than this – and so do they".

=== Accolades ===
I'll Take My Chances received five nominations at the 2012 Golden Icons Academy Movie Awards, including "Best Motion Picture" and won the award for "Best Costume". It also got three nominations at the 2012 Best of Nollywood Awards and received the award for "Best Edited Movie".

Complete list of Awards
Award	Category	Recipients and nominees	Result
2012 Golden Icons Academy Movie Awards	Best Motion Picture	Desmond Elliot	Nominated
2012 Golden Icons Academy Movie Awards	Best New Actor	Bryan Okwara	Nominated
2012 Golden Icons Academy Movie Awards	Best Film Producer	Emem Isong	Nominated
2012 Golden Icons Academy Movie Awards	Best Costume	Angel Nwakibie, Obijie Oru	Won
2012 Golden Icons Academy Movie Awards	Best Sound	semiu Adewuyi	Nominated
2012 Best of Nollywood Awards	Most Promising Act (male)	Bryan	Nominated
2012 Best of Nollywood Awards	Best Edited Movie	Victor Ehi Amedu	Won
2012 Best of Nollywood Awards	Best use of Costume	Angel Nwakibie, Obijie Oru	Nominated

== Home media ==
I'll Take My Chances was released on DVD on 26 November 2012. The VCD version is split in two parts.

== See also ==
- List of Nigerian films of 2011
