= Stalker (2016 film) =

- FilmPoster
- Directed by: Moses Inwang
- Written by: Moses Inwang; Patrick Nnamani
- Produced by: Moses Inwang; Caroline Danjuma
- Starring: Jim Iyke; Nse Ikpe Etim; Caroline Danjuma; Ayo Makun
- Cinematography: Olawale Adebayo
- Edited by: Moses Inwang
- Production companies: Sneeze Films; Kinetic Media
- Release date: 26 February 2016
- Running time: 109 minutes
- Country: Nigeria
- Language: English

Stalker is a 2016 Nigerian romantic drama film, directed by Moses Inwang and starring Nse Ikpe Etim, Jim Iyke, Caroline Danjuma and Ayo Makun. It premiered in Nigeria on 26 February 2016. It received 12 nominations and won 3 awards at the 2015 Golden Icons Academy Movie Awards in the United States.

== Plot ==
Kaylah is a successful fashion stylist that has many celebrities as clients. On returning home after styling one of her clients, she had a flat tyre in a remote village. Unfortunately for her, she encounters traditionalist looking for a female sacrifice for their gods. Michael saves her from the ritualists. After exchanging pleasantries, Michael continues to stalk Kaylah everywhere to her distaste. Kaylah eventually got a police injunction against Michael that prevents him from being anywhere around her through the help of her police uncle. Kaylah discovers her boyfriend, Dickson is a married man with kids. She tearfully ended the relationship upon the discovery and was emotionally down. Kaylah's younger sister, gives her the gifts and writeups originally given to her by Michael in an attempt to calm her from the numerous heartbreaks. Upon reading the letter, Kaylah, now obsessed with the idea of getting Michael back, decides to find him and pleads his forgiveness. A flashback reveals that Michael wasn't actually following her, but their pathways met coincidentally on numerous occasions. Kaylah makes romantic advances towards Michael who revealed that he was already engaged to Ella. Unbeknownst to Michael, Kaylah befriends Ella then cunningly visits Michael's home when Ella was supposed to be away in Abuja. Unfortunately for her, Ella barged into the house and a physical duel between both ladies erupted. Ella is killed before Michael returns home.

== Cast ==
- Jim Iyke as Michael
- Nse Ikpe Etim as Kaylah
- Caroline Danjuma as Ella
- Anthony Monjaro as Dickson
- Emem Inwang as Cassandra
- Niyola as herself
- Ayo Makun as Police Officer
- Lionel Esabe as Jerry
- Solomon Danjuma as Ralph
- Adekunle Obawunmi as Oro Priest
- Christopher Udie as Salami
- Grace Ojete Uguoma as Cashier
- Omawunmi Megbele as Nene (Dickson's Wife)
- Blessing James as Boutique Attendant
- Jerry Akpowomare as Vulcanizer
- Oddman Emeka Aneke as Restaurant extra
- Abiola Atanda as Washerwoman
- Samuel Dibal as Waiter
- Amaka Enekwaizu as Waiter
- Rachael Ikechwame as Actress

== Reception ==
It has won 3 awards and 12 nominations.
