= Shakib Cham Lutaaya =

Ugandan entrepreneur and reality television personality

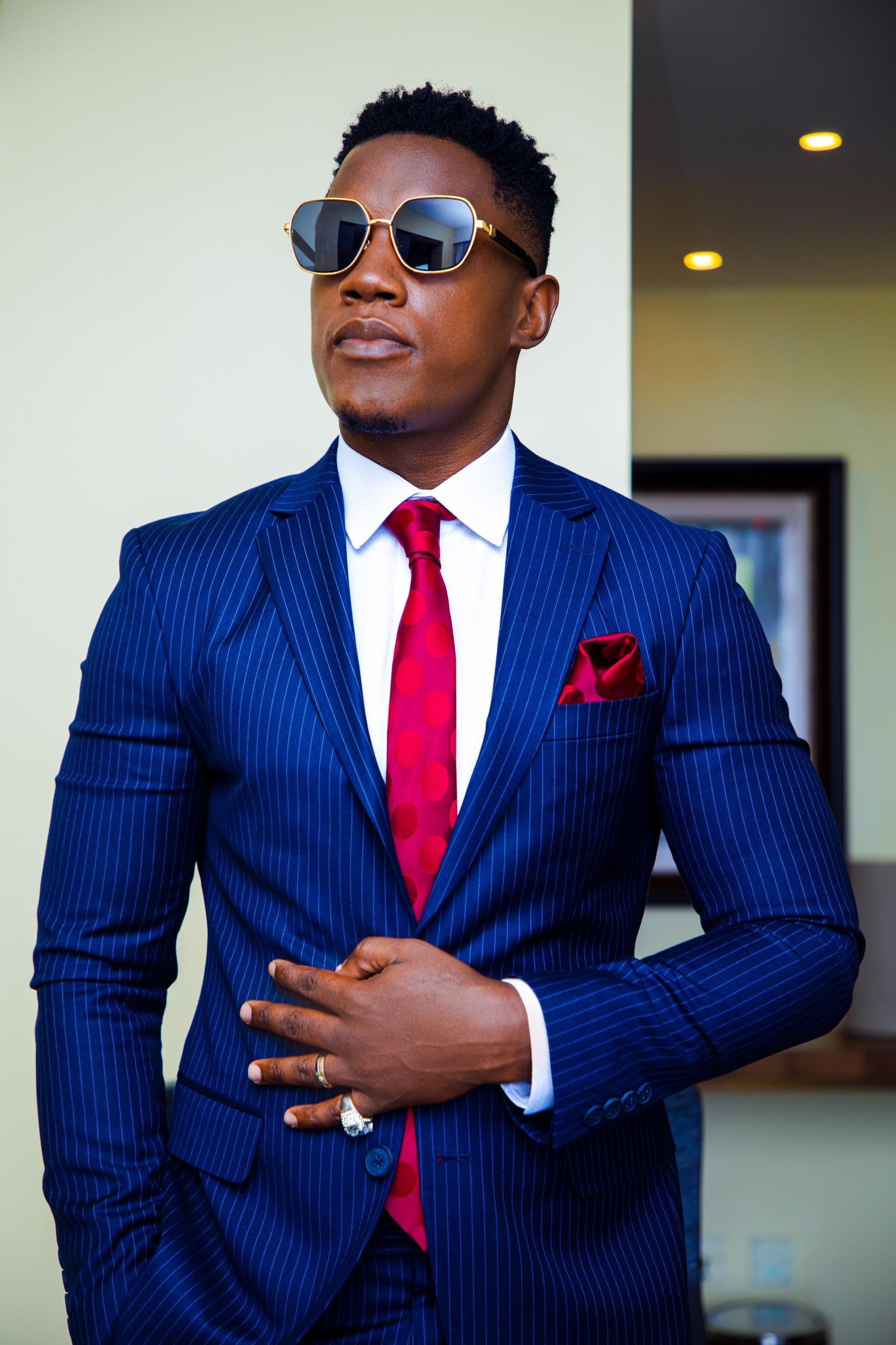
- Shakib Cham Lutaaya in 2025
- Born: January 5, 1992 (age 34); Kampala, Uganda
- Other name: Shakib Cham
- Citizenship: Ugandan
- Education: Nakasero Primary School; Cambridge College Gayaza
- Occupations: Entrepreneur; reality television personality; DJ
- Years active: 2010–present
- Known for: Appearances on Young, Famous & African; Marriage to Zari Hassan
- Spouse: Zari Hassan (m. 2023)
- Children: 1

Shakib Cham Lutaaya (born 5 January 1992), also known as Shakib Cham, is an Ugandan entrepreneur, reality television personality, corporate boxer, fashion entrepreneur and DJ. He gained public attention through his appearance in the third season of Netflix's reality series Young, Famous & African, which premiered in January 2025.

== Early life and education ==
Lutaaya was born on 5 January 1992 in Kampala, Uganda. He attended Nakasero Primary School and later Cambridge College Gayaza for his secondary education. He has lived and worked in both Uganda and Gauteng, South Africa.

== Career ==
=== Business ventures ===
Lutaaya entered the business sector around 2010, primarily in Uganda's automotive industry. He founded Cham Motors (also known as Cham's Approved Cars), a car dealership specialising in new and used vehicles. He subsequently launched King Cham Collections, an urban apparel brand, and Aliko Minerals Uganda, a mineral trading company.

=== Reality television ===
Lutaaya appeared in season three of Netflix's reality series Young, Famous & African, which premiered on 17 January 2025. The season was primarily filmed in Johannesburg, South Africa, and featured affluent African celebrities. Other cast members included Bonang Matheba, Diamond Platnumz, Ini Edo, Khanyi Mbau, and 2Face Idibia.

=== Corporate boxing ===
Lutaaya has participated in corporate boxing matches in Uganda. On 12 October 2024, he competed in an event organised by the Uganda Boxing Federation as part of the Champions League series, defeating television personality JK Kazoora at the NCS Indoor Arena in Lugogo, Kampala. The match ended when Kazoora surrendered in the third round.

On 30 August 2025, Lutaaya faced musician Rickman Manrick in a celebrity boxing match billed as "The Kampala Rumble" at the MTN Arena Lugogo. He lost by knockout in the second round.

== Personal life ==
Lutaaya married Zari Hassan, a Ugandan-South African businesswoman and socialite, in a private Islamic Nikah ceremony on 18 April 2023 in South Africa. He has one child from a previous relationship. Through his marriage, he is stepfather to Hassan's five children from her previous relationships with the late Ivan Semwanga and Diamond Platnumz.

== Controversies ==
=== 2024 robbery ===
In January 2024, Lutaaya reported that he was robbed at a supermarket in his Kampala neighbourhood. He stated that a thief snatched his bag containing two mobile phones, cash, and expensive chains. He publicly accused an associate of musician Pallaso of involvement in the theft, though the accused denied the allegations.

=== 2025 police investigation ===
In December 2025, Kampala Metropolitan Police summoned Lutaaya for questioning in connection with an alleged robbery and assault at Chezz Boss Mutoto Bar in Munyonyo, Kampala. According to police spokesperson Luke Owoyesigyire, the incident occurred on 27 December 2025, when a group allegedly attacked patrons and stole mobile phones from four victims. A case was registered at Kabalagala Police Station. Lutaaya denied involvement in the robbery, stating that he intervened to stop a fight between two groups at the bar.
