= Golden Icons Academy Movie Awards =

- Awarded for: Outstanding Achievement in Film
- Country: United States
- Presented by: Golden Icons Magazine
- First award: 2012
- Final award: 2015
- Website: www.goldenicons.com www.giamaawards.com

Golden Icons Academy Awards (GIAMA) was an annual film award ceremony held in the diaspora to reward outstanding contributions to the African film industry. The first edition was held in Houston, United States. The most recent ceremony took place at the Stafford Center Performing Art Theater on October 17, 2015. It marked the fourth edition of the awards. No ceremony was held in 2016.

== Ceremonies ==
- 2012 Golden Icons Academy Movie Awards
- 2013 Golden Icons Academy Movie Awards
- 2014 Golden Icons Academy Movie Awards
- 2015 Golden Icons Academy Movie Awards

== Categories ==
- Best Motion Picture
- Best Drama
- Best Cinematography
- Best Comedy
- Best Costume
- Most Promising Actress (Best New Actress)
- Best Actress
- Best Supporting Actress
- Most Promising Actor (Best New Actor)
- Best Actor
- Best Supporting Actor
- Best Director
- Best Indigenous
- Best Original Screenplay
- Best Sound
- Producer of the Year
- Best Original Soundtrack
- Best Film Diaspora
- Most Promising Actor – Diaspora
- Most Promising Actress- Diaspora
