= Kokomma =

- Film poster
- Directed by: Tom Robson
- Produced by: Uduak Isong Oguamanam
- Starring: Belinda Effah; Ekere Nkanga; Ini Ikpe; Ifeanyi Kalu
- Production company: Royal Arts Academy
- Release date: September 2012
- Country: Nigeria
- Language: Ibibio

Kokomma is a 2012 Nigerian drama film directed by Tom Robson. It stars Belinda Effah, Ini Ikpe, Ifeanyi Kalu and Ekere Nkanga. It received 3 nominations at the 9th Africa Movie Academy Awards, with Effah winning the award for Most Promising Actor for her comic role in the film. It was released on DVD in September 2012.

== Cast ==
- Belinda Effah as Kokomma
- Ini Ikpe
- Ekere Nkanga
- Ifeanyi Kalu as Usen
