= Miss Africa Great Britain =

Beauty pageant for African women in UK

- Miss Africa Great Britain
- Abbreviation: MAGB
- Formation: 1 January 2011
- Founder: Dele Onabowu
- Website: missafricagb.com

Miss Africa Great Britain is a beauty pageant open to African women between the ages of 18 and 39, resident in the United Kingdom. The winner becomes a goodwill ambassador for Miss Africa Great Britain, charged with designing and implementing a charity program based on her "pageant platform".

== History ==
The Miss Africa GB pageant was founded in 2011. The pageant was initially called Miss Black Africa UK and changed its name to Miss Africa Great Britain in December 2015. The pageant was formed to give young African women born or living in the United Kingdom a platform to showcase their beauty and more importantly their culture, talent and creativity.

== Title holders ==
Leila Samati was crowned Miss Africa Great Britain 2018. She became Miss World Guinea Bissau 2019 and competed in the Miss World 2019 finals on 14 December 2019.

Jacqueline Ilumoka was crowned Miss Africa Great Britain in October 2014. She was featured on BBC's The One Show.

She was also featured in Hello! in an article titled "Hello! Presents a Year of Love" in partnership with Swarovski.

== Winners ==
Year	Name	Country	Notes
2011	Ruvimbo Chinzou	Zimbabwe	She launched a charity project called Inflame the Dream
2012	Samaia Tchapesseka	Angola	Samaia became queen in 2012.
2013	Precious Okeke	Nigeria	She was crowned in 2013 but was later disqualified as she was due to wed, just months into her reign which was a breach of contract.
2014	Jacqueline Ilumoka	Nigeria	She launched the I am Able Nigeria charity project in 2015, releasing a charity calendar in the same year.
2015	Susana Owono	Equatorial Guinea	Owono was crowned in 2015 and raised funds for her charity mission to Equatorial Guinea.
2016	Sarah Jegede	Nigeria	She was crowned in 2016. She raised funds and embarked on a charity mission to Nigeria. She was hosted by the Governor of the state and paid a courtesy call on the Ooni of Ife.
2017	Larissa Tcheukam	Cameroon	She became queen in October 2017 and raised funds for a school in Cameroon.
2018	Leila Samati	Guinea Bissau	She was called to represent Guinea Bissau at the Miss World 2019 finals in London.
2019	Cecilia Musonda	Zambia	She was crowned on 5 October 2019.
2020	Chinyanta Kabaso	Zambia	She became queen on 17 October 2020
2021	Alima Ndiaye	Senegal	She was crowned on 5 November 2021
2022	Aida Mebrahtu	Eritrea	She was crowned on 4 November 2022
2023	Stephanie Danho	Ivory Coast	Stephanie became Queen on 18 November 2023
2024	Deborah Mungai	Kenya	Deborah was crowned on 26 October 2024
2026	Gracia Susuzande	Democratic Republic of the Congo	She became Queen on 2nd of May 2026
