= Ivan Semwanga =

Ugandan-born South African socialite (1977–2017)

- Born: 12 December 1977; Nakaliro, Kayunga, Uganda
- Died: 25 May 2017 (aged 39); Pretoria, South Africa
- Education: Bachelor degree, Sokoine university of agriculture
- Occupations: Businessman, philanthropist

Ivan Semwanga (12 December 1977 – 25 May 2017) was a Ugandan-born South African socialite. He was one of the members of the self-styled Rich Gang group well known in both South Africa and Uganda. The Rich Gang group was based on both humanitarian and philanthropy principles which target the less privileged youths, especially Ugandans living in South Africa. Other key members of the group are; Ivan's cousin Lawrence, a Ugandan tycoon based in South Africa, and Eddy Kyeyune. The Rich Gang graced several occasions both in Uganda and South Africa. Also, Ivan invested in numerous educational institutions in South Africa.

== Early life and education ==
Ivan was born in Nakaliro, Kayunga District. He then moved to South Africa for greener pastures, and it is alleged that Ivan worked as a ritualist in a local shrine in South Africa. He was helping rich South Africans to solve their problems by dumping them on the ground and giving them holy water that would wash their problems away. This helped Ivan accumulate wealth and by the time he died, Ivan had made a fortune with multimillion Business Empires which included Schools (in South Africa), students’ hostels, and apartments among others. Ivan was christened the ‘modern father of Showbiz’ in Uganda because he gave a new look to the socialite scene. All the current socialites in Uganda learnt the game from Ivan. Ivan married Zarinah Hassan, who is popularly known as Zari. The couple had three boys together. In 2011, Ivan and Zari organized a traditional introduction ceremony which cost over a billion Uganda shillings. In 2013, the couple called it quits after Zari accused Ivan of domestic violence. Zari was involved in a relationship with a Tanzanian musician called Diamond Platnumz in 2014 and separated from him in 2018.

== Achievements ==
Ivan started the Brooklyn Colleges which have 6 branches spread across Durban, Pretoria and Johannesburg. The colleges specialize in Information Technology, Mining and Policing services among others. In Uganda, Ivan was constructing a hotel on Sir Apollo Kagwa road, he also had several houses in Bunga, Munyonyo and Mutungo. A combination of all those projects leaves him with over Uganda Shs700m profits per month. Additionally, Ivan had two main houses in Sandton and Pretoria.

== Philanthropy ==
Ivan was considered to be the chairman of Ugandans in South Africa. He helped several needy people in both South Africa and Uganda. Three weeks before his death, he visited the underprivileged kids in M-Lisa orphanage, Nsambya. On his visit, he donated household items like bags of rice, sugar, soap, cooking oil and many other basic needs to the orphans. He also gave each orphan Ugandan Shs20, 000 before returning to South Africa where he died. Early on, Ivan gave the Uganda National Football team (Uganda Cranes) Uganda Shs10m in cash during the African Cup of Nation match between Uganda and Ghana. He also promised the team Uganda Shs5m for all the goals they scored. Within 90minutes, the Uganda Cranes had beaten Ghana before they crossed to a penalty shoot-out. Furthermore, Ivan once sponsored 10 fans with all expenses from South Africa to Uganda to watch the Uganda VS Zambia game live at Mandela National Stadium (Namboole).

== Death ==
Ivan suffered a heart attack after leaving Uganda. Before his departure to South Africa. Ivan was admitted at Steve Biko Hospital in Pretoria where his ex-wife; Zari took care of him. He later died on Thursday, 25 May 2017 morning.

== Burial ==
The body of the deceased was brought back to Uganda on 28 May 2017(Sunday). A vigil was held at his home in Muyenga, Uganda that night. Ivan's body was then taken to Namirembe Cathedral on 29 May 2017 (Monday) for church prayers before he was taken to Kayunga for burial. Ivan was buried on 30 May 2017(Tuesday) in his ancestral home in Kayunga, Uganda. When still alive, Ivan would organize parties where he would throw notes of South Africa Rands, Uganda Shillings and US Dollars to people. The same trick was used by the remaining Rich gang members while burying him. So, instead of throwing handfuls of dust into his grave as it is in the Christian tradition, the Rich gang members tossed of notes of South Africa Rands, Uganda Shillings and US Dollars and Champagne in Ivan's grave. Concerned citizens; Abey Mgugu and Gideon Tugume dragged A-Plus funeral management and Bank of Uganda to the High Court seeking orders that the body of late Ivan should be exhumed and all the currency notes that were buried with him removed. They argued that the money was being misused since it is a legal tender. Therefore, they wanted it to be removed and brought back for the purpose of fulfilling its use. They continuously argued that the currency of Uganda and other nations like South Africa and the United States of America should be respected and not end up being buried. In response, the Bank of Uganda wrote a document stating how it is no longer interested in retrieving the money buried in the grave as the money no longer serves its purpose. They stated that the money was mishandled but then it is likely to be defaced, soiled or damaged and so it will no longer serve the purpose for which it was intended. Furthermore, amendments were made to the Bank of Uganda Act because the previous one didn't state penalizing someone who defies paper money.

== Reports concerning his identity and death ==
Days after Ivan's burial, rumors started circulating that Ivan had faked his death and he was in South Africa enjoying life. In an exclusive interview, Zari (Ivan's ex-wife) disclosed how Ivan's dead body was checked out of Entebbe International Airport through South Africa Airways using a fake name and a fake death certificate – Ali Sennyomo. Zari also confirmed Ivan's behaviour of frequently changing his identity in South Africa depending on the deals he was doing. He was still using the name Ali Sennyomo as his official identity when he died. The doctors at Steve Biko Hospital were treating the patient; Ali Sennyomo and even the body that checked into and out of Entebbe International Airport, Uganda was of Ali Sennyomo. Zari continuously insisted that the body that was buried in Kayunga was of Ivan only that he was using the identity of Ali Sennyomo while working in South Africa. Ivan would switch back to Semwanga every time he landed at Entebbe International Airport, Uganda. This was during his trips back home on business or to visit people but at South Africa’s Olivier Tambo International Airport, he was Ali Sennyomo.
