= Carolyna Hutchings =

Scottish Born Nigerian actress (born 1977)

- Born: Scotland
- Occupations: Actress, film producer, interior designer, businesswoman, philanthropist
- Years active: Over two decades
- Website: www.hutchingslimited.com

Carolyna Hutchings (formerly known as Caroline Ekanem and Caroline Danjuma) is a Scottish-Nigerian actress, film producer, interior designer, businesswoman, and philanthropist. She is known for her contributions to various fields, including the entertainment industry, construction, interior design, and the oil and gas sector.

== Early life and education ==
Carolyna was born in Scotland to a Scottish father and a Nigerian mother. She is the first of three children and grew up in Nigeria. She holds a BSc in Geographical and Regional Planning from the University of Calabar and an MSc in International Law and Diplomacy from the University of Lagos. She further pursued an MBA from Edinburgh Business School, UK.

== Career ==
Chico Ejiro, through Rita Dominic, introduced Hutchings to the Nigerian film industry through the 2004 film Deadly Care. She has starred in other successful films, including Deadly Kiss (2004), Missing Angel (2004), The Captor (2006), Foreign Affairs, Real Love, The Twist, A Second Time and The Beast and the Angel. Her latest film is Stalker, co-starring Jim Iyke and Nse Ikpe Etim. In August 2017, she was honored for her advocacy programs centered around building capacities for Nigerian youths by a Pan-African organization.

In 2022, Carolyna Hutchings entered politics as governorship running-mate in Akwa-Ibom State.

== Humanitarian efforts ==
Carolyna is the founder of Hopeville Foundation, an NGO dedicated to supporting women facing childbearing difficulties, children with birth defects, and promoting girl child education and empowerment.

== Filmography ==
Some of the movies Carolyna Hutchings has starred in include:

- Stalker (2016) as Ella
- Cold Feet (2020) as Counsellor
- Come Alive (2021) as Meg
- Mr Badmus (2019)
- Minority Tension (2007)
- The Captor (2006) as Gina
- Deadly Kiss (2004) as Nina
- In the Cupboard
- Show Girls (2006)
- Chameleon (2004)
- 11 Days 11 Nights (2005) as Michelle
- Mass Destruction
- The Journalist (2006)
- Face of Africa (2005)
- Colors of Emotions (2005) as Zelda
- Missing Angel (2004) as Zarah
- Fake Liars

== Personal life ==
Carolyna was previously married to Musa Danjuma, the younger brother to former defense minister, Theophilus Danjuma, in 2007. She had three children from the marriage. In 2016, the couple separated.

== See also ==
- List of Nigerian film producers
