= Zari Hassan =

Ugandan socialite, musician and businesswoman (born 1980)

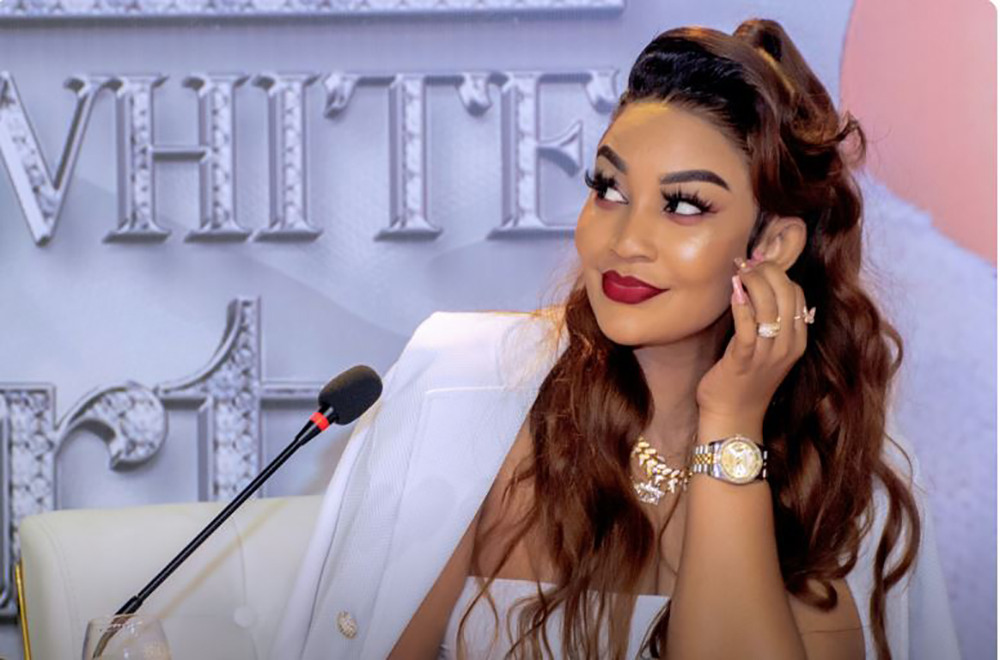
- Hassan in 2023
- Born: September 23, 1980 (age 46); Jinja, Uganda
- Citizenship: Uganda
- Education: Institution in London (Diploma in Cosmetology)
- Occupations: Businesswoman, socialite
- Years active: 1992–present
- Spouses: Ivan Semwanga (m. 2001; div. 2013) Diamond Platnumz (m. 2014; div. 2018) Shakib Lutaaya (m. 2023)

Zarinah Hassan (born 23 September 1980), commonly known as Zari Hassan, alias Zari the Boss Lady, is a Ugandan socialite, musician, businesswoman and actress. She resides in South Africa.

She is the heiress and CEO of Brooklyn City College (BCC), a South Africa-based educational institute. It is diverse and progressive. She co-founded BCC with her late husband Ivan Semwanga. BCC maintains a headquarters campus in Pretoria, with satellite campuses in Polokwane, Durban, Johannesburg, Nelspruit, Vereeniging and Rustenburg.

== Biography ==
Hassan returned to her native Uganda in 2004, after two years in the United Kingdom. Afterwards she moved to South Africa, where she met and married Ivan Semwanga. Together they had three children. They divorced in 2013 after Hassan accused Semwanga of physically abusing her.

In May 2017, Semwanga suffered a massive stroke and was admitted to Steve Biko Academic Hospital. He died on 25 May 2017 and was buried in Uganda. Following the funeral, Hassan returned to South Africa to manage her businesses and some of her late husband's enterprises.

She has two children with Tanzanian artist Diamond Platnumz.

In October 2023, Hassan got married Ugandan businessman Shakib Cham Lutaaya.

== Songs ==
- hotter than them
- Zari the boss lady tolaba
- oli wange
