= Uche Jombo =

Nigerian American actress and film director (born 1979)

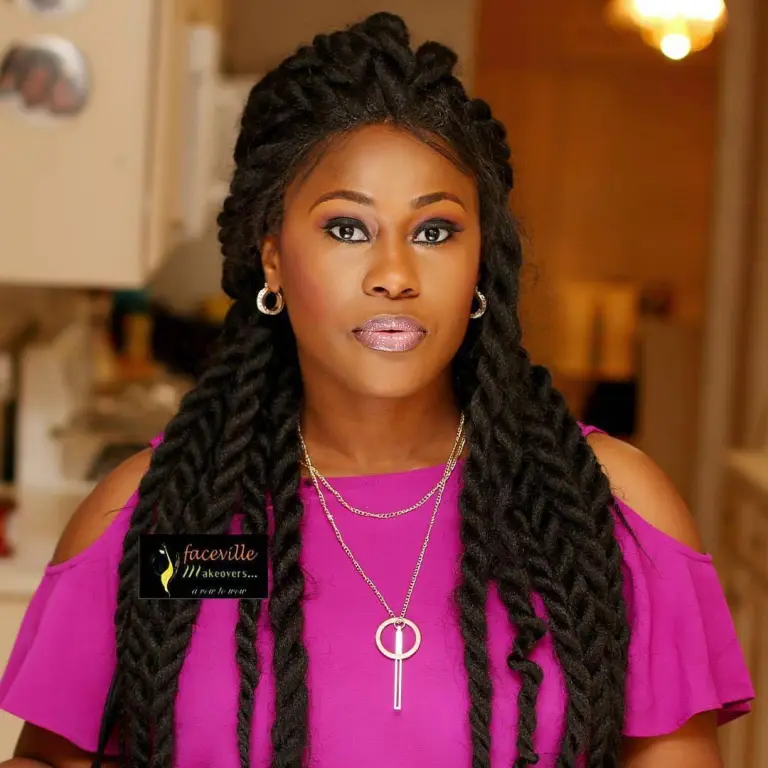
- Uche Jombo captured in a promotional photograph by Faceville Makeovers.
- Education: University of Calabar
- Occupations: Actress, Film Producer, director, Writer
- Children: 1

Uche Jombo is a Nigerian actress, screenwriter, and film producer. She has appeared in over 250 Nollywood movies and has also written and produced. She is known for her roles in movies such as Visa to Hell, Girls Hostel, Fire Love, Endless Lies, Nollywood Hustlers and many more. She is also an ambassador for Globacom.

== Early life ==
Jombo is a graduate of Mathematics and Statistics from the University of Calabar in Cross River State, Nigeria and Computer Programming from the Federal University of Technology Minna.

== Career ==
Uche Jombo ventured into the Nigerian movie industry in 1999 in the movie Visa to Hell. As a screenwriter, she has written and co-written several movies some of which include: The Celebrity, Games Men Play, Girls in the Hood, and A Time to Love. Jombo went on to produce the films Nollywood Hustlers, Holding Hope, and Damage, which deals with the issue of domestic violence. Later roles included starring in Heaven on My Mind, the football drama comedy Onyegwu, and Rok Studios series Dr. Love. Jombo is an ambassador for Globacom.

Her screenplay credits include Games Men Play, Lies Men Tell, Holding Hope, A Mother's Fight, Unconditional, A Time to Love, Be My Wife, and Celebrity.

In 2008, she started executive production of her films through her Uche Jombo production company. She started directing in 2015, with the films Lost in Us, How I Saved My Marriage, and the Nollywood true-life drama Heaven on My Mind.

She runs a non-governmental organization called Uche Jombo and You, helping Nigerian youth.

Having entered the Nigerian film industry at age 17, Jombo revealed that she nearly quit acting early in her career due to structural challenges, low remuneration, and difficult working conditions before deciding to persevere.

== Personal life ==
Uche married Kenny Rodriguez in 2012 and proceeded to directing in 2015 after the birth of her son.

=== Arrest ===
Uche was once arrested for shooting a film in a police station without taking permission from the Inspector General of Police (IGP) at Surulere, Lagos.

== Filmography ==
Year	Film	Role	Notes
1999	Visa to hell		
2000	Girls Hostel		with Mary Uranta
2002	Fire Love		with Desmond Elliot
2004	Scout		with Alex Lopez
2005	Endless Lies	Becky	with Desmond Elliot
2005	Darkest Night		with Genevieve Nnaji, Richard Mofe Damijo and Desmond Elliot
2005	Black Bra		
2006	Secret Fantasy		with Ini Edo
2006	Price of Fame		with Mike Ezuruonye and Ini Edo
2006	My Sister My Love	Hope	with Desmond Elliot
2006	Love Wins	Ege	with Desmond Elliot
2006	Co-operate Runs		with Zack Orji
2006	Girls Cot	Bella	with Genevieve Nnaji, Rita Dominic and Omotola Jalade Ekeinde
2007	World of Commotion		with Zack Orji and Mike Ezuruonye
2007	Rush Hour		
2007	Price of Peace	Afoma	with Chioma Chukwuka and Jim Iyke
2007	Most Wanted Bachelor	Lucy	with Ini Edo and Mike Ezuruonye
2007	Keep My Will	Susan	with Genevieve Nnaji and Mike Ezuruonye
2007	House of Doom	Ijeoma	with Zack Orji and Mike Ezuruonye
2007	Greatest Harvest	Nwando	with Pete Edochie
2007	Final Hour		with Tonto Dikeh
2008	Feel My Pain	Nneka	with Mike Ezuruonye
2008	Beyonce & Rihanna	Nichole	with Omotola Jalade-Ekeinde, Nadia Buari and Jim Iyke
2009	Love Games		with Jackie Appiah and Ini Edo
2009	Entanglement		with Desmond Elliot, Mercy Johnson and Omoni Oboli
2009	Silent Scandals	Muky	with Genevieve Nnaji & Majid Michel
2010	Home in Exile		with Desmond Elliot
2010	Holding Hope	Hope	with Desmond Elliot and Nadia Buari
2011	Kiss and Tell	Mimi	with Desmond Elliot and Nse Ikpe-Etim
2011	Damage	Sarah	with Tonto Dikeh
2012	Mrs Somebody	Desperado	
2012	Misplaced	Debra	with Van Vicker
2013	After The Proposal	Mary	with Patience Ozokwor and Anthony Monjaro
2013	Lagos Cougars	Aret	
2016	Lost in Us		with Okey Uzoeshi
2016	Wives on Strike	Madam 12:30	with Chioma Chukwuka and Omoni Oboli
2017	Banana Island Ghost	Ghost Mama	with Chigul and Dorcas Shola Fapson
2018	Heaven on My Mind	Uju	with Ini Edo
2018	How I saved My Marriage	Esther	
2018	Lara and the Beat	Fadekemi West	With Shaffy Bello, Ademola Adedoyin, Chioma Chukwuka Akpotha
2019	40 Looks Good on You		with John Dumelo and Shaffy Bello
2020	14 Days	Dorathy	with Uzor Arukwe and Uzo Davies
2021	Devil in Agbada	Lady Gold	with Alex Ekubo, Desmond Elliot, and Uzor Arukwe
2022	Blood Sisters	Uchenna	TV Mini Series
2023	Dr. Love	Dr. Love	with Ifeoma Obinwa
2023	Shanty Town		With Ini Edo, Nse Ikpe Etim, Chidi Mokeme
2023	Marriage Roommate	Chioma	With Olu Deno Adebamowo, Dil Chike Ajufo, Chinneylove Eze
2023	Onyegwu	Ngozika	
2024	Mr Patrick Wahala in America	Attorney	with Eugene Bernard, Farheen Barey and Chinedu Daniel
	A Father's Love	Bigsis	With Yvonne Jegede, David Jones David, Funny Bone

== Accolades ==
Year	Event	Prize	Recipient	Result
2008	AfroHollywood Awards -UK	Best Actress		Won
2008	4th Africa Movie Academy Awards	Best Supporting Actress	Keep My Will	Nominated
2010	2010 Best of Nollywood Awards	Best Supporting Actress	Silent Scandals	Won
2010	City People Entertainment Awards	Best Actress		Won
2010	Abia State Awards	Honor Award	Herself	Won
2010	Life Changers Awards-UK	Nollywood Personality of the year	Herself	Won
2010	5 Continents Awards -New York	Merit award for charity support	Herself	Won
2011	ELOY awards	Best Actress Leading role	Damage	Won
2011	2011 Best of Nollywood Awards	Best Actress Leading role	Damage	Nominated
2011	2011 Best of Nollywood Awards	Best Screenplay	Damage	Nominated
2011	2011 Best of Nollywood Awards	Best Kiss with Kalu Ikeagwu	Damage	Nominated
2012	Nafca	Best Actress Leading Role	Damage	Won
2012	Nafca	Best Film	Damage	Won
2012	2012 Golden Icons Academy Movie Awards	Female Viewers Choice Awards	herself	Nominated
2012	8th Africa Movie Academy Awards	Best Actress Leading Role	Damage	Nominated
2013	Africa International Film Festival	Best Actress Leading Role	Lies Men Tell	Won
2013	2013 Best of Nollywood Awards	Best Actress Leading Role-English	Mrs Somebody	Nominated
2014	ELOY Awards	Female Film Producers of the Year	—N/a	Nominated
2014	2014 Golden Icons Academy Movie Awards	Best On Screen (with Patience Ozokwor)	After The Proposal	Nominated
2014	2014 Golden Icons Academy Movie Awards	Female Viewers Choice Awards	Herself	Nominated
2014	2014 Africa Magic Viewers Choice Awards	Best Movie - Comedy	Lies Man Tell	Nominated
2014	10th Africa Movie Academy Awards	Best Actress Leading Role	Lagos Cougars	Nominated
2015	2015 Golden Icons Academy Movie Awards	Best Actress	oge's sister	Nominated
2015	2015 Golden Icons Academy Movie Awards	Female Viewers Choice	Herself	Won
