= Susan Nwokedi =

Nigerian-American filmmaker, writer, producer, actor, educator and businessman

- Born: November 11, Nigeria
- Other name: Ngozi
- Occupations: Nigerian-American Filmmaker, Writer, Actor, Entrepreneur, Educator

Susan Nwokedi is a Nigerian-American filmmaker, writer, producer, actor, educator, and businessman. Nwokedi wrote and produced Mind of the Enemy, which received an award nomination for Best Original Soundtrack at the Nollywood & African Film Critics' Awards in 2013.

== Early life ==
Nwokedi was born in Nigeria and moved to Houston, Texas as a small child. When Nwokedi was in high school, she had her first taste of the film industry when she worked in several Hollywood films. After learning first-hand what it took to be in the film industry, Nwokedi went on to produce and direct several films. Nwokedi also worked as a writer and educator. After high school, she earned a Bachelor of Arts degree in Theatre Arts at the University of Houston and later earned a Master of Science Degree in Education in Media Design and Technology - Film from Full Sail University in Florida. She also obtained a second master's degree in Educational Leadership from the University of St. Thomas.

== Career ==
In 2008, Nwokedi created TopLine Productions and Entertainment, Co. LLC. (TopLine), a production company specializing in quality film and television/media productions. In the same year, Nwokedi played Teresa in the Nollywood film, Ricochet, that she also co-wrote and executive produced. In 2009, Nwokedi produced Blood N' Destiny, followed by Secret Past in 2011. In 2012, her internationally acclaimed feature film Mind of the Enemy Premiered in Nigeria and the U.S. The film was also shot on location in Abuja, Nigeria and featured some of the biggest names of the time in the Nollywood industry. Nwokedi has written, produced, directed, and appeared in many films both in house and non in house productions.

== Personal life and other projects ==
Besides being a filmmaker, Nwokedi is also an educator. She resides in the state of Texas, with her family. Nwokedi completed an Education Leadership Program at the University of St. Thomas, and is a certified school principal and instructional leader. She worked as a classroom teacher for over 10 years at Fort Bend Independent School District. In 2010, Nwokedi founded Children Come Click Education and Technology Center, (CCC), a supplemental education program that specializes in helping learners of all age reach their academic goals. She also serves as administrator for Acting for All (AFA), an enrichment program that uses acting and arts to help children and adults build reading, writing, acting, communication skills, and confidence. She believes in sharing her talents with others, regardless of their demographic and location. Her advice for anyone interested in being in the film industry is to get out there and get involved in the filmmaking process, because even if it doesn't pay yet, you will have learned what it takes to make a film.

== Awards, nominations, and recognition ==
- September 2013- Nwokedi was nominated Best Original Soundtrack for Mind of the Enemy at the Nollywood & African Film Critics' Awards.
- May 2013- Nwokedi was honored at Trendy Africa Magazine Mothers Appreciation Event for her community service and outstanding achievements in a chosen career.
- August 2015- Best actress in Mind of the Enemy at L.A.N.F.A.
- August 2016- Best film Mind of the Enemy at L.A.N.F.A
- October 2017 -TFN Esther Rolle Image Award

== Filmography ==
Title	Year	Role	Director(s)
Mind of the Enemy	2012	Angela Anadu	Joseph Van Vicker
12 Noon	Post-production	Ngozi Ego	Susan Nwokedi, Tola Balogun
Single Wives Club	2017	Jody	Susan Nwokedi
As Long As I Am	2017	Lucy	Susan Nwokedi
Secret Past	2013	Yvonne	A.B. Sallu
A Hopeful Journey	2017	Elise	Prince McNoun
The Brat	2014	Nneka	Dytmi Ibe
Exit	In production	Isabella	Lupe Nunez
Tears on my Pillow	2017	Linda	Isola Balogun
Resentment	2011	Abused Wife	Mike Ugada
African Connection	2012	Dr. Khan	A.B. Sallu
Pound of Flesh	2014	Dr. Riley	Don Okolo
Ricochet	2008	Teresa	Don Okolo
Blood n' Destiny	2009	Producer (did not act)	Don Okolo
Alice in America	Post-production	Grieved Widow	Chinny Chukwu
The Land	2010	Producer (did not act)	Don Okolo
Royal Dilemma	2010	Dalia	Stanley Acholonu
Dirty Pastor	2013	Angela	A.B. Sallu
The Other Side	2014	Detective May	Ike Nnaebue
Another Leaf	2014	Nneka	Ike Nnaebue
Jason's Lyric	1994	Featured	Doug McHenry
Return of Exile	2001	Nina	Don Okolo
Sidekickes	1994	Featured	Chuck Norris
Lads in the City	2015	Laura	Macolm Benson
TopLine Presents (Talk Show)	2010–present	Host	Susan Nwokedi
Street Talk (TV Show)	2009	Host	Susan Nwokedi, Chris Ulasi
My Drug Brother	2007	Jennifer	Stanley Acholonu
Blindfolded	2014	Star TV Anchor	Ikechukwu Oyeka
Jurica Road	2020	Producer	Don Okolo
