= Ini Edo =

Nigerian actress (born 1982)

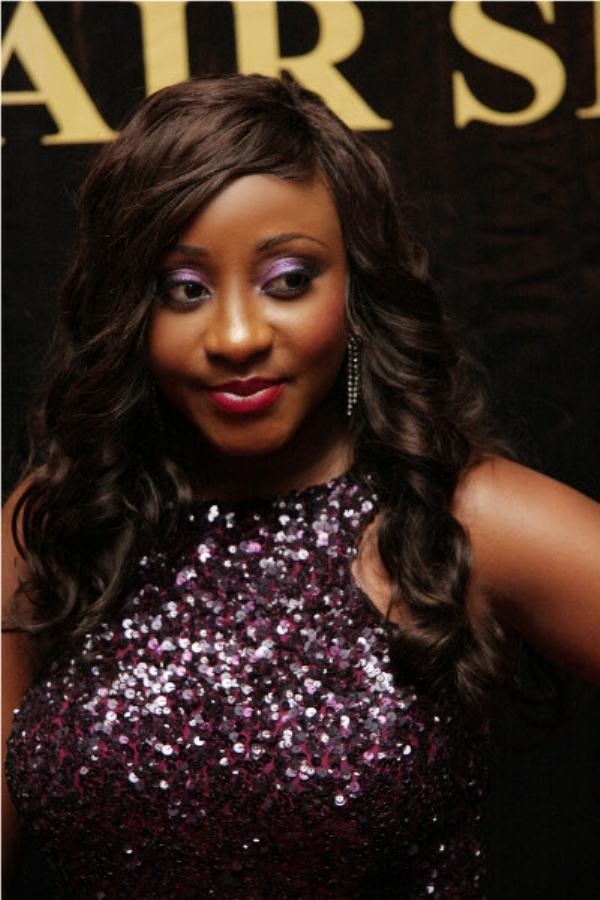
- Born: Iniobong Edo Ekim; 23 April 1982 (age 44); Akwa Ibom, Nigeria
- Education: University of Uyo; University of Calabar; National Open University of Nigeria
- Occupation: Actress
- Years active: 2000–present
- Spouse: Philip Ehiagwina (m. 2008; div. 2013)
- Children: 1

Iniobong Edo Ekim (born 23 April 1982) is a Nigerian actress. Ini Edo began her acting career in 2000, and has featured in more than 200 movies since her debut. In 2013, Ini Edo was a judge for the Miss Black Africa UK Pageant and De9jaSpirit Talent Hunt. In 2014, she was appointed by the United Nations as a United Nations Habitat Youth Envoy.

== Early life and education ==
Ini Edo is an Ibibio from Akwa Ibom state located in the south-south part of Nigeria. Her mother was a school teacher, and her father was a church elder. Ini Edo had a strict upbringing, the second of four children, three girls, and one boy. She attended Cornelia Connely College in Uyo, Nigeria. She graduated from the University of Uyo where she got a Diploma in Theatre Arts. She also completed her Bachelor's degree program at the University of Calabar where she studied English. In 2014, she got a scholarship to study law at the National Open University of Nigeria.

== Career ==
Her acting career started in 2000 with her debut in Thick Madam. Ini Edo was discovered by a producer at the audition she attended. Her breakthrough came in 2004 when she acted in World Apart. She has appeared in over 100 films. She earned a "Best Lead Actress" nomination at the 11th Africa Movie Academy Awards for her performance in the movie "While You Slept".

In 2017, she stated that only hard work and dedication can get one to the top in the Nollywood industry, as there are many distractions.

In 2021, she created a luxury fashion and cosmetic brand called Secrets Of April, which offers High Fashion Apparel, beauty products and accessories.

She represents the National Democratic Institute (NDI), an NGO that works to improve the efficacy of democratic institutions, as an ambassador.

In 2023, Ini Edo produced ShantyTown, a 2023 Nigerian crime thriller released to Netflix on 20 January 2023.

Ini Edo is among the Judges at De9jaspirit Talent Hunt, she has so far anchored the first, second and third seasons.

In 2025 Ini Edo was one of the stars in the third season of Africa's first reality tv series on Netflix: "Young, Famous & African". The show has recently topped the chart at #5 in Tv shows as of 4 January 2025.

== Personal life ==
In 2008, Ini Edo married Philip Ehiagwina an American-based business man. The marriage ended in September 2014 after six years. In 2016, she stated that her being stuck in traffic, and consequently late for mass, spared her from being involved in the Uyo Church collapse, which killed many inside. Ini Edo had her first child, a girl through surrogacy, in 2021.

== Philanthropy ==
She is the founder of GEMS (Girls Empowerment Mentorship Scheme) AFRICA an NGO built to support young women in different fields providing tutoring, skills acquisition, and support. Gems Africa has supported over 10000 African girls across a broad spectrum of industries.

== Endorsement ==
- Ini Edo was Glo brand ambassador for ten years from 2006 to 2016.
- In 2010, she was named to be the brand ambassador of Noble Hair.
- Ini Edo is brand ambassador of Slim Tea Nigeria.
- In 2019, she was signed as an ambassador for the MrTaxi NG brand.

In 2023, she was signed as an ambassador for the Capital Luxury brand.

== Political appointment ==
Ini Edo was appointed as the Special Assistant to the Akwa Ibom State Governor on culture and tourism by Udom Gabriel Emmanuel in 2016.

== Awards and nominations ==
Year	Event	Prize	Recipient	Result	Ref
2009	2009 Best of Nollywood Awards	Best Actress Leading Role (Yoruba)		Won	
2011	Zulu African Film Academy Awards	Best Actress Indigenous	Edika Nigeria	Won	
2012	2012 Golden Icons Academy Movie Awards	Best Actress In Leading role	In a cupboard	Nominated	
2012	2012 Golden Icons Academy Movie Awards	Female Viewers Choice	Herself	Nominated	
2012	2012 Golden Icons Academy Movie Awards	Honorarium Appreciation Award	Herself	Won	
2013	2013 Golden Icons Academy Movie Awards	Female Viewers Choice	Herself	Won	
2013	Cross River Movie Award	Best Act Female(English)	Behind The Melody	Won	
2013	Nafca	Best supporting Actress	Weekend Getaway	Won	
2014	2014 Golden Icons Academy Movie Awards	Best Actress Leading Role	Nkasi The Village Fighter	Nominated	
2014	2014 Golden Icons Academy Movie Awards	Best Comedic act	Nkasi The Village Fighter	Nominated	
2014	2014 Golden Icons Academy Movie Awards	Best Actress-Viewers Choice	Nkasi The Village Fighter	Nominated	
2015	2015 Golden Icons Academy Movie Awards	Best Actress	While you slept	Nominated	
2015	2015 Golden Icons Academy Movie Awards	Female Viewers Choice	While you slept	Nominated	
2015	2015 Ghana Movie Awards	Best Actress - Africa Collaboration	While you slept	Won	
2015	11th Africa Movie Academy Awards	Best Actress Leading Role	While you slept	Nominated	
2016	2016 Africa Magic Viewers Choice Awards	Best Actress in a Comedy	Desperate housegirls	Nominated	
2016	2016 Nigeria Entertainment Awards	Best Actress - TV Series	Desperate housegirls	Nominated	
2018	ZAFAA Global Awards	Best Actress	While you slept	Won	
2021	Net Honours	Most Popular Actress		Nominated	
2021	Africa Movie Academy Awards	Best Actress in a Supporting Role	The Citation	Nominated	
2023	2023 Africa Magic Viewers Choice Awards	Best Actress in a Drama	Shanty Town	Nominated	

== Filmography ==
Year	Film	Role	Notes
2003	Thick Madam		
2004	World Apart	Ulinma	With Kenneth Okonkwo, Liz Benson and Hilda Dokubo
2004	Eye of the Gods		With Olu Jacobs, Stephanie Linus, Muna Obiekwe
2004	Beautiful Faces		With Stephanie Linus
2005	Ultimate Crisis		With Rita Dominic and Olu Jacobs
2005	The Begotten		With Rita Dominic
2005	Only Love	Udoka	With Rita Dominic and Olu Jacobs
2005	Last Game		With Rita Dominic
2005	Desperate Billionaire	Naomi	With Rita Dominic and Kanayo O. Kanayo
2005	Lonely Hearts		With Stephanie Linus
2006	Girls Cot	Eve	With Genevieve Nnaji, Rita Dominic, Uche Jombo
2006	Secret Fantasy		With Uche Jombo
2006	Price of Fame	Stephanie	With Uche Jombo and Mike Ezuruonye
2006	Married to the Enemy		with Mercy Johnson, Desmond Elliot
2006	Games Men Play		with Chioma Chukwuka, Jimy Ike, Kate Henshaw-Nuttal, Dakore Akande, Kalu Ikeagwu, Chinedu Ikedze
2006	Political Control		
2006	Ass on Fire		
2006	Breathe Again	Pat	
2007	Sleek Ladies	Cindy	With Rita Dominic
2007	Most Wanted Bachelor	Brenda	With Uche Jombo and Mike Ezuruonye
2007	Ghetto Queen		With Funke Akindele
2007	Power of Beauty	Vera	
2009	Love Games		With Uche Jombo and Jackie Appiah
2009	Reloaded (2009 film)	Tayo	With Ramsey Nouah, Stephanie Linus, Rita Dominic, Nse Ike Eptim and Desmond Elliot
2009	Live To Remember		With Mercy Johnson
2009	Native Son		
2010	White Hunters	Tabita	With Mercy Johnson, Funke Akindele, and Halimar Abubakar
2010	Return of White Hunters		With Mercy Johnson, Funke Akindele, and Halimar Abubakar
2010	Mad Sex	Amara	With Uche Jombo, Johnpaul Nwadike, and Amaechi Muonagor
2011	I'll Take My Chances	Idara	With Bryan Okwara, Sam Loco Efe and Jide Kosoko
2014	Caro The Iron Bender	Caro	
	Royal Gift'		
	Blind Kingdom'		
2014	Beyond Disability	Adesua	Directed by Desmond Elliot
2014	Knocking on Heaven's Door	Brenda	With Adesua Etomi, Majid Michel, Blossom Chukwujekwu
2015	Birthmark	Minna	With David Uzoma Aboy, Busola Ademolu
2016	Lipstick	Deborah	Directed by Lucky Stephen
2017	The Patient	Nurse	Featuring Seun Akindele and directed by Sobe Charles Umeh
2018	Heaven on My Mind	Ivie Peters	Directed by Uche Jombo
2019	Chief Daddy	Ekanem	Featuring Richard Mofe Damijo and directed by Niyi Akinmolayan
2020	Citation (film)	Gloria	
2021	The Ghost and the Tout Too	Inem	With Ayomide Abayode, Alexander Abolore
2022	Gbege		With Jide Kosoko, Ebele Okaro, Sam Dede, Mercy Aigbe, Zubby Micheal, Sanni Muaizu, Charles Inojie, Harry B, Broda Shaggi, Nosa Rex, Junior Pope.
2022	The Man for the Job	Esohe	With Akintoba Adeoluwa, Rita Anwarah, Uzor Arukwe, Ali Baba
2022	Moving On	Amanda	With Mitchelle Agugbua, Chris Akwarandu, Onyii Alex, Victoria Bassey
2023	Shanty Town	Inem	With Chidi Mokeme, Nse Ikpe-Etim, Nancy Isime, Mercy Eke, Richard Mofe Damijo, and directed by Dimeji Ajibola.
2023	Rent a Room	Labake	With Jim Iyke, Uche Jombo, Evan King, Pere Egbi
2023	Onyeegwu	Eno	With Toyin Abraham, Lateef Adedimeji, Natacha Akide

- Fatal Seduction (2006)
- The Greatest Sacrifice (2006)
- My Heart Your Home (2006)
- No Where to Run (2006)
- Stolen Tomorrow
- Sacrifice for Love (2006)
- Silence of the Gods (2006) as Nkoli
- Supremacy (2006)
- Too Late to Claim (2006) as Rose
- Total Control (2006) as Laura
- Traumatised (2006) as Idara
- War Game (2006)
- 11:45... Too Late (2005)
- The Bank Manager (2005) as Ifeoma
- The Bet (2005)
- Cold War (2005) as Udoka
- Crying Angel (2005) as Nkem
- Desperate Need
- Emotional Blackmail (2005)
- I Want My Money (2005)
- Last Picnic (2005)
- Living in Tears (2005)
- Living Without You (2005)
- Men Do Cry (2005)
- My Precious Son (2005) as Tina
- One God One Nation (2005) as Rosie
- Weekend getaway
- Pretty Angels (2005)
- Red Light (2005)
- Royal Package (2005)
- Security Risk (2005)
- Songs of Sorrow (2005)
- Stronghold (2005)
- Tears for Nancy (2005) as Nancy
- Unforeseen (2005)
- Eyes of Love (2004) as Helen
- Faces of Beauty (2004) as Melisa Snr.
- Indecent Girl (2004) as Patra
- Indulgence (2004)
- I Swear (2004) as Cynthia
- Legacy (2004)
- Love Crime (2004)
- Love & Marriage (2004)
- Negative Influence (2004)
- Not Yours! (2004)
- The One I Trust (2003)
- Sisters On Fire
- Royalty Apart
- Never Let Go
- End of Do or Die Affair
- Darkness of Sorrows
- Final Sorrow
- Behind The Melody
- Memories of The Heart
- Royal Gift
- Dangerous
- Save The Last Dance
- Battle For Bride
- Caged Lovers
- In The Cupboard (2012) as Trisha
- Hunted Love
- Anointed Queen
- A Dance For The Prince
- Bride's War
- Tears In The Palace
- Slip of Fate
- At All Cost
- The Princess of My Life
- Inale (2010) as Omada
- I'll Take My Chances (2011) as Idara
- Nkasi The Village Fighter
- Nkasi The Sprot Girl
- The Return of Nkasi
- Soul of a Maiden
- Blood is Money

== See also ==
- List of Nigerian actresses
