= Swanky Jerry =

Nigerian Celebrity Fashion Stylist

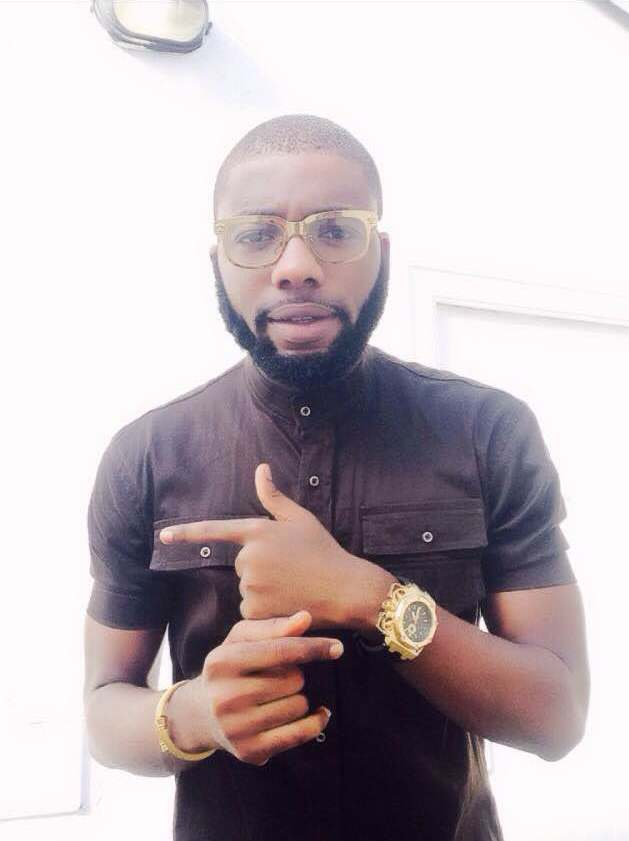
- Born: Jeremiah Ogbodo; 4 July 1991 (age 34); Lagos, Nigeria
- Occupation: Fashion stylist

Jeremiah Ogbodo (born 4 July 1991), better known as Swanky Jerry, is a Nigerian fashion stylist. Swanky grew up in Bonny camp Victoria island

== Career ==
Swanky began his career as a fashion stylist by launching his brand, Swanky Signatures Styling, in June 2012. Aside from styling clients for red-carpet appearances and video shoots, coverage of his work has appeared in magazines and online publications. He styled Darey for House of Maliq, D'banj for a photo shoot, Praiz, and Davido for the "All of You" music video shoot, among others.

In 2014, Swanky won Fashion Stylist of the Year at the Lagos Fashion Awards.

In 2021 he was announced as part of the casts for the Netflix-produced reality show Young, Famous & African including Shakib Cham Lutaaya.

In 2025 Swanky was named the Most Stylish African Man Alive 2025 by GQ Canada.
