= James Tanimola Ayorinde =

Nigerian Baptist minister (born 1907)

James Tanimola Ayorinde, more well known as J.T. Ayorinde, was born in 1907 and died in the 1970s. He was the first Nigerian General Secretary (and chief executive officer) of the Nigerian Baptist Convention, in the 1960s. Ayorinde served as General Secretary from 1962 until his retirement in the 1970s.

Based on the customs of Yoruba, "it was revealed to the Ifa priest who performed a divination at the naming ceremony that he would be an Ifa priest." His name, Tanimola, means, "Who knows honor?"

Rev. Dr. Ayorinde was married to Mobola Ayorinde, who was President of the Women's Missionary Union of the Nigerian Baptist Convention.

Ayorinde was a national delegate of Nigeria, along with his fellow Baptist clergyman, Solomon Adeniyi Babalola, to the 1974 International Congress on World Evangelization, Lausanne, Switzerland.
