= List of Nigerian films of 2015 =

This is a list of Nigerian films scheduled for theatrical release in 2015.

== 2015 ==
=== January–March ===
Opening		Title	Director	Cast	Genre	Studio	Ref.
J A N U A R Y	16	Gone Too Far!	Destiny Ekaragha	OC Ukeje; Adelayo Adedayo; Shanika Warren-Markland; Malachi Kirby	Comedy	Poisson Rouge Pictures; British Film Institute; FilmOne Distribution	
J A N U A R Y	30	The Department	Remi Vaughn Richards	Majid Michel; OC Ukeje; Desmond Elliot; Jide Kosoko; Osas Ighodaro	Romantic thriller	InkBlot Productions; Closer Pictures; FilmOne Distribution	
F E B R U A R Y	6	The Green Eyed	Blessing O. Oduefe	Nse Ikpe Etim; Kalu Ikeagwu; Tamara Eteimo; Blossom Chukwujekwu	Drama	Poise Fendy Entertainment	
F E B R U A R Y	13	The Antique	Darasen Richards; DJ Tee	Olu Jacobs; Bimbo Akintola; Gabriel Afolayan; Ricardo Agbor; Seun Akindele	Drama	Darasen Richards Films	
F E B R U A R Y	13	Grey Dawn	Shirley Frimpong-Manso	Bimbo Manuel; Funlola Aofiyebi-Raimi; Sika Osei; Marlon Mave	Drama	Sparrow Productions	
F E B R U A R Y	20	Dazzling Mirage	Tunde Kelani	Kemi "Lala" Akindoju; Seun Akindele; Kunle Afolayan; Carol King	Drama	Mainframe Films	
F E B R U A R Y	20	The Other Side	Ike Nnaebue	Uche Jombo; Chet Anekwe	Drama		
F E B R U A R Y	26	Thy Will Be Done	Obi Emelonye	Ramsey Nouah; Mercy Johnson; Mary Njoku	Drama	The Nollywood Factory	
F E B R U A R Y	27	Still Standing	Michael Uadiale Jr	Jackie Appiah; Bobby Obodo	Drama	GenMeMoir	
M A R C H	6	The Duplex	Ikechukwu Onyeka	Omoni Oboli; Mike Ezuruonye; Uru Eke	Supernatural Thriller	Videofield International	
M A R C H	15	Yes I Don't	Best Okoduwa	Van Vicker; Judith Audu; Ireti Osayemi	Romantic drama	Dexterity Pictures	
M A R C H	20	While You Slept	Desmond Elliot	Ini Edo; Joseph Benjamin; Venita Akpofure	Drama	Royal Arts Academy	
M A R C H	27	Hunting 4 Hubbies	Yinka Idowu	Marie Gomez; Orwi Imanuel Ameh; Armour Owolabi; Ronke Ogunmakin	Drama		
M A R C H	27	In the Music	Chibuzor Afurobi	Bryan Okwara; Beverly Naya; Omawumi Megbele; Chelsea Eze; Keira Hewatch	Musical		

=== April–June ===
Opening		Title	Director	Cast	Genre	Notes	Ref.
A P R I L	3	Friends or Foes	Ejike Chinedu Obim	Belinda Effah; Daniella Okeke; Dabby Chimere; Jojo Charry	Drama		
A P R I L	17	What's Within	Rukky Sanda	Joseph Benjamin; Rukky Sanda; Alexx Ekubo	Romantic comedy	Rukky Sanda Productions	
A P R I L	24						
A P R I L	24	Luke of Lies	Emmanuel Mang Eme	Alexx Ekubo; Belinda Effah; Daniella Okeke; Eddie Watson	Romantic drama		
A P R I L	24	Of Bad Faith	Ike Nnabue	Omoni Oboli; Kalu Ikeagwu; Nsikan Isaac	Romantic comedy	Rukky Sanda Productions	
M A Y	1	The Boss is Mine	Okechukwu Oku	Bishop Ime Umoh; Daniella Okeke; Michael Godson	Comedy		
M A Y	1	So in Love	Ike Nnabue	Bryan Okwara; Belinda Effah; Lilian Esoro	Romantic Drama		
M A Y	3	As Crazy as It Gets	Shittu Taiwo	Omoni Oboli; Chucks Chyke; Tehilla Adiele	Romantic Comedy	Reel Pixel Entertainment	
M A Y	8	The Grave Dust	Ikechukwu Onyeka	Ramsey Nouah; Joke Silva; Joseph Benjamin	Drama	Crown Prince Productions; B-King Movies	
M A Y	8	Busted Life	Austin Chima	Ramsey Nouah; Majid Michel; Chet Anekwe	Drama		
M A Y	8	Beneath Her Veil	Adeyinka Oduniyi	Wole Ojo; Kalu Ikeagwu; Tina Mba; Moyo Lawal	Drama	Audio Visual First	
M A Y	10	Where Does Beauty Go	Abiodun Williams	Clarion Chukwura; Tony Umez; Abiola Segun Williams	Drama		
M A Y	10	Night For Sex	Abiodun Williams	Kalu Ikeagwu; Moyo Lawal; Mary Lazarus	Drama		
M A Y	15	Ikogosi	Toka Mcbaror	Chelsea Eze; IK Ogbonna	Romantic drama	Plus 66 Studios	
M A Y	19	Oloibiri	Curtis Graham	Olu Jacobs; Richard Mofe Damijo; Ivie Okujaye; Daniel K. Daniel; Chucks Chyke	Drama		
M A Y	29	Silver Rain	Juliet Asante	Joselyn Dumas; Uru Eke; Enyinna Nwigwe	Drama		
J U N E	5	The Guest	Christian Olayinka	Rita Dominic; Femi Jacobs; Somkele Iyamah; Chika Chukwu	Drama	Banner Films; The Audrey Silva Company	
J U N E	5	A Place Called Happy	Dolapo Adeleke	Blossom Chukwujekwu; Kiki Omeili; Adeyemi Okanlawon	Drama	Light Screen Films	
J U N E	12	The Perfect Man	Olamide Oyelade	Ikenna Obi; Diana Childs; Tara Nwachukwu	Romantic Drama	Banner Films	
J U N E	12	Superstar	Tony Abulu	Ayo Makun; Bryan Okwara; Toyin Aimakhu; Racheal Oniga; Jide Kosoko	Comedy Drama		
J U N E	26	3 is Company	Ernest Obi	OC Ukeje; Wole Ojo; Yvonne Jegede	Romantic Drama	Banner Films	
J U N E	26	Mummy Dearest	Willis Ikedum	Liz Benson; Daniel K. Daniel	Drama	Wheels Pictures	
J U N E	26	Diary of The Triplets	Bright Wonder	Kalu Ikeagwu; Bright Wonder; Iyke Adiele; Osas Iyamu; Chucks Chyke	Comedy Drama	High Definition Film Studios	

=== July–September ===
Opening		Title	Director	Cast	Genre	Notes	Ref.
J U L Y	3	Miss Flawless	Tissy Nnachi	Mimi Orjiekwe; Belinda Effah; Kenneth Okolie	Drama		
J U L Y	3	If Tomorrow Never Comes	Pascal Amanfo	Yvonne Nelson; Adeyemi Okanlawon	Drama	YN Productions	
J U L Y	10	Mum, Dad, Meet Sam		Joseph Benjamin; Anthony Ofoegbu	Drama		
J U L Y	17	Tempting Fate	Kevin Nwankwor	Ramsey Nouah	Drama	KevStel Group	
J U L Y	24	Affairs of the Heart	Robert Peters	Joseph Benjamin; Stella Damasus; Beverly Naya	Romantic drama		
J U L Y	24	Heroes and Villains	Shittu Taiwo	Belinda Effah; Seun Akindele; Ivie Okujaye; Sylvia Oluchy	Romantic drama	Reel Pixel Films	
A U G U S T	20	Romance is Overrated	Belinda Yanga	Bryan Okwara; Kiki Omeili; Keira Hewatch	Romantic Drama	RME Pictures	
A U G U S T	21	Miss Taken	Ike Nnaebue	Seun Akindele; Uru Eke	Drama		
A U G U S T	21	Last Night	Andy Boyo	Prince David Osei	Drama		
A U G U S T	21	Scarred	John Uche	Van Vicker; Mamai Kerneh; Al Johnson	Drama	Eagle Eye Productions	
A U G U S T	28	Diary of a Lagos Girl	Jumoke Olatunde	OC Ukeje; Linda Ejiofor; Alexx Ekubo; Liz Benson; Dolapo Oni	Drama	Parables Entertainment	
A U G U S T	28	Lunch Time Heroes	Seyi Babatope	Omoni Oboli; Dakore Akande; Tope Tedela; Dianna Yekinni	Drama	PHB Films	
S E P T E M B E R	3	Forever Within Us	Pat Oghre Imobhio	Seun Akindele; Blossom Chukwujekwu; Mary Lazarus	Drama		
S E P T E M B E R	18	Falling	Niyi Akinmolayan	Adesua Etomi; Blossom Chukwujekwu; Tamara Eteimo	Drama	Closer Pictures	

=== October–December ===
Opening		Title	Director	Cast	Genre	Notes	Ref.
O C T O B E R	2	Gbomo Gbomo Express	Walter Taylour	Ramsey Nouah; Osas Ighodaro	Caper Comedy	WaltBanger 101	
O C T O B E R	9	The Cursed Ones	Nana Obiri Yeboah	Ama K. Abebrese; Jimmy Jean-Louis	Drama		
O C T O B E R	16	The Visit	Funke Fayoyin	Nse Ikpe-Etim; Blossom Chukwujekwu	Drama		
O C T O B E R	23	4-1-Love	Ikechukwu Onyeka	Alexx Ekubo; Anthony Monjaro; Lilian Esoro	Romantic drama		
O C T O B E R	23	A Soldier's Story	Frankie Ogar	Tope Tedela; Linda Ejiofor; Adesua Etomi; Zainab Balogun	Drama	Frankie Ogar Films	
N O V E M B E R	27	Taxi Driver: Oko Ashewo	Daniel Oriahi	Odunlade Adekola; Femi Jacobs; Ijeoma Grace Agu; Hafeez Oyetoro	Romantic Drama	FilmOne Production; House 5 Production; Orbit Imagery	
N O V E M B E R	27	Road To Yesterday	Ishaya Bako	Genevieve Nnaji; Oris Erhuero; Majid Michel	Comedy Thriller	The Entertainment Network	
D E C E M B E R	18	Fifty	Biyi Bandele	Ireti Doyle; Nse Ikpe Etim; Dakore Akande; Omoni Oboli	Romantic Drama	EbonyLife Films	

== Unknown release dates ==
- '76
- Heaven's Hell
- 93 Days
- Code of Silence (2015 film)
- Dangerous Twins

== See also ==
- 2015 in Nigeria
- List of Nigerian films
