= Bolanle Austen-Peters =

Nigerian movie director (born 1969)

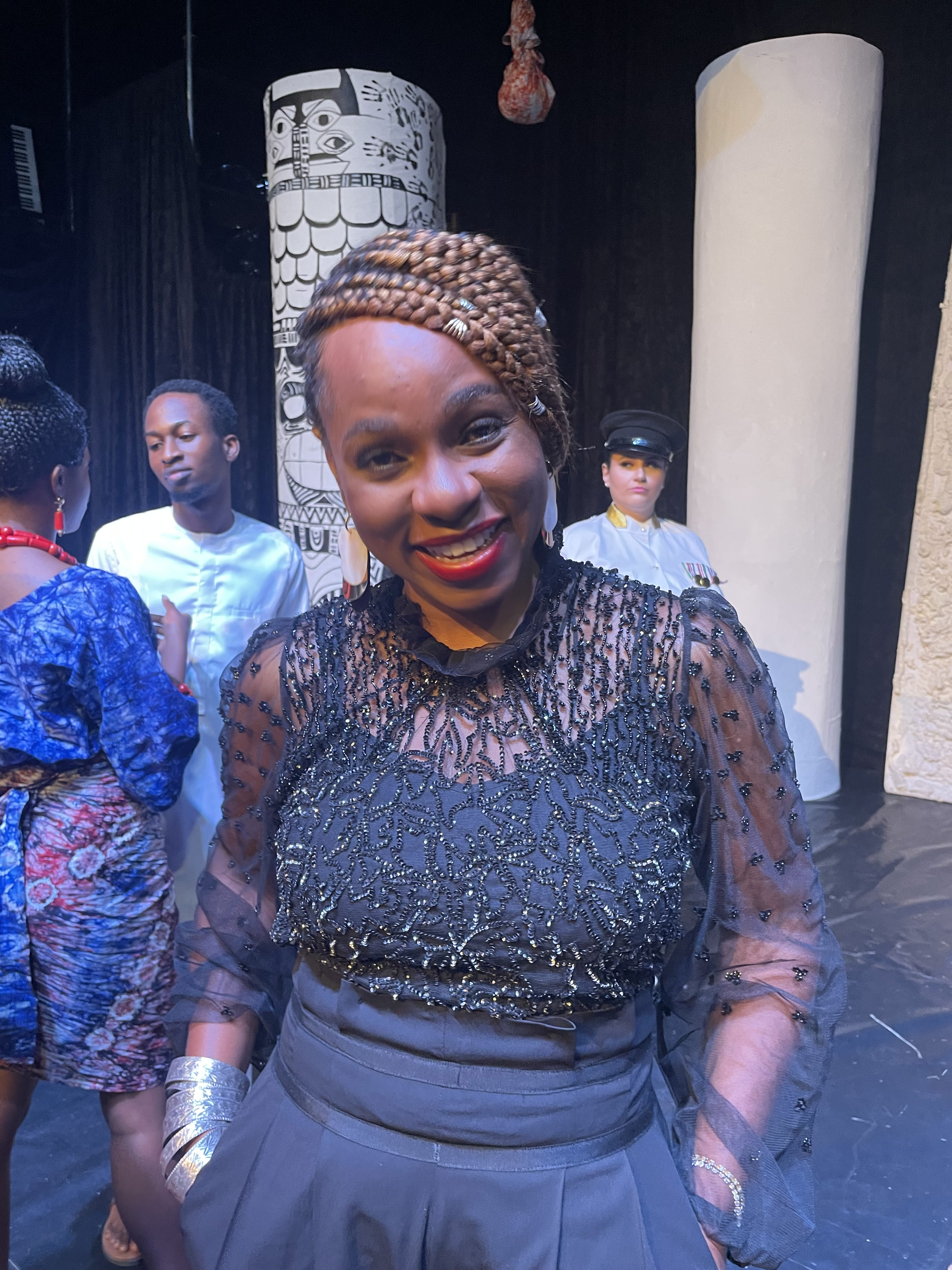
- Born: 4 February 1969 (age 57); Ibadan, Nigeria
- Education: University of Lagos; London School of Economics
- Occupations: Director, Producer, Entrepreneur
- Organization(s): Terra Kulture, BAP Productions, Terra Academy For The Arts (TAFTA)

Bolanle Austen-Peters (born 4 February 1969), is a Nigerian lawyer, filmmaker, theatre director, producer, and cultural entrepreneur. She is the founder and artistic director of BAP Productions as well as the arts and culture center Terra Kulture in Lagos.

She has been described by the CNN as the "woman pioneering theater in Nigeria", and by others as the "'Tyler Perry' of Nigeria" for her contributions to film and theatre. Austen-Peters was named one of the most influential women in Africa by Forbes Afrique and has received multiple awards in recognition of her contributions to the arts.

Her notable works include the films 93 Days, Funmilayo Ransome-Kuti, Collision Course and House of Ga’a, as well as stage productions such as Saro the Musical, Fela and the Kalakuta Queens, and Moremi the Musical. Several of her productions have gained international recognition, with screenings at global festivals and top rankings on Netflix worldwide.

Her film Funmilayo Ransome-Kuti, based on the life of the Nigerian activist, became the highest-grossing biopic in West Africa. In addition, her historical drama House of Ga’a entered the Top 10 Global Chart for Non-English Films during its first week of release, and later ranked among the Top 10 indigenous films on Netflix, reaching No. 7 worldwide.

Beyond film, she established and hosted the Lagos International Theatre Festival (LITF), regarded as the largest theatre festival in West Africa. The festival featured local and several international companies.

Furthermore, in partnership with the Mastercard Foundation, she founded the Terra Academy for the Arts, which has trained over 60,000 students in creative disciplines. The academy operates in Ogun, Lagos, and Kano States, Nigeria. She had earlier worked with the United Nations.

== Early life and career ==
Austen-Peters was born in 1969 in Ibadan, Oyo State in the south-western region of Nigeria. She is the daughter of Emmanuel Afe Babalola, a Senior Advocate of Nigeria and Rtd Major, Mrs Bisi Babalola. She gained a BA in Law from the University of Lagos and an MA from London School of Economics and Political Science. In the 1990s she worked as a lawyer in Afe Babalola and Co Barristers and Solicitors and with the United Nations High Commissioner for Refugees in Switzerland .

In 2003, she founded Terra Kulture, an educational and cultural hub for Nigerian languages, arts, and culture. It includes a restaurant, art gallery, auction house, bookstore, language school, theater, film production studio, and Academy for the study of art. Located on Tiamiyu Savage Street in Lagos, its Arena is the first privately owned theater in Nigeria.

In 2013, she established her own production company Bolanle Austen-Peters Productions (BAP Productions). BAP Production is the production house, set up to change the narrative about Africa by promoting women as example from FRK, Fela and the Kalakuta queens; social issues e.g. The Bling Lagosians and Collision Course (2021 film) and 93 Days. The company entered the Nigerian theater industry with its first production Saro, the musical. The musical was staged in Lagos and in 2016 went on tour to London's West End. The musical tells the story of four young men who decide to embark on a journey to Lagos where they seek to realize their dreams.

In 2015, Austen-Peters produced the film 93 Days . It tells the story of the Ebola outbreak in Nigeria and premiered on 13 September 2016 in Lagos. It was shown at the Toronto International Film Festival, The Chicago Film Festival, the Pan African Film Festival in Los Angeles, the Johannesburg Film Festival, and at the Africa Film Festival in Cologne/Germany, and nominated for a Rapid Lion Award. It won the award for Best Lighting Designer at the 2017 Africa Magic Viewers Choice Awards, and received thirteen nominations. 93 days was also nominated for the Rapid Lion Award and in 7 categories for the 2017 Africa Movie Academy Awards, which was the highest nominated film in 2017 AMAA.

In 2016, Austen-Peters directed the musical Wakaa, which tells the story of the trials, successes and experiences of a group of graduate students. It was the first Nigerian musical to be staged in London’s West End, and recorded sold out shows at the Shaw theatre in London.

In 2017, Austen-Peters directed the musical Fela and The Kalakuta Queens. It chronicles the life of the Afrobeat legend Fela Kuti, and the women that were an integral part of his band. It was produced and created with the support of Fela Kuti’s estate. It was shown in Nigeria, Egypt and South Africa. The musical is one of the biggest to come out of Africa with over 120,000 people having watched it.

In 2019, Austen-Peters directed the film Bling Lagosians which highlights the individual feuds within a wealthy Lagos family. It was nominated for two awards including Best Art Director, Africa Magic Viewers' Choice Awards. It starred Nollywood actors and actresses including Gbenga Titiloye, Elvina Ibru, Osas Ighodaro, Toyin Abraham, Jide Kosoko, Sharon Ooja, Bisola Aiyeola, Denola Grey, Monalisa Chinda, Helen Paul and Alex Ekubo.

In the same year, she also directed the musical ‘Man Enough’ which is a monologue in three voices; a man crying to be heard, a man yelling to be saved from a world that thinks he is ‘Superman’ and a man fearing to speak. It is a story of a man proving his worth and when he is man enough.

In 2020, Austen-Peters directed the movie Collision Course which tells the story of the lives of a law enforcement agent and an aspiring musician in Nigeria. It was shown on Netflix and won Best Movie (West Africa) at the Africa Magic Viewers’ Choice Awards and was nominated for four awards including Best Film, Africa International Film Festival AFRIFF (2021), Best Performance in a Film, AFRIFF (2021), Best Performance in a Film, AMA (2021). It starred Chioma Chukwuka Akpotha, Ade Laoye, Kenneth Okolie, Daniel Etim Effiong, Bimbo Manuel, Gregory Ojefua, Bamike Olawunmi-Adenibuyan, Kalu Ikeagwu and Nobert Young.

In 2021, Austen-Peters directed the movie Man of God (2022 film) which tells the story of a man who is caught between religion, expectations and his own belief. The movie was produced for Netflix and became the most viewed movie of the month. It stars the actors Akah Nnani, Osas Ighodaro, Prince Nelson Enwerem, Dorcas Shola Fapson, Atlanta Bridget Johnson, Patrick Doyle, Jude Chukwuka, Eucharia Anunobi, Shawn Faqua, Mawuli Gavor and Olumide Oworu.

In 2022, Austen-Peters directed the movie Funmilayo Ransome-Kuti which tells the story of Funmilayo; from her pioneering days as the first female student at Abeokuta Grammar School to her marriage to Israel Ransome-Kuti. The movie the won ‘Best Overall Feature Film’ and the ‘Best Screenplay’ awards. The film features movie stars like Joke Silva, Kehinde Bankole, Ibrahim Suleiman, Jide Kosoko, and Dele Odule. The movie is also known as the "All time highest grossing biopic in West Africa".

In 2023, Austen-Peters directed the movie, House of GA'A which tells the story of a ruthless Prime Minister desperate for revenge ferociously rises to power, stopping at nothing to become more powerful than the kings he served. In the first week of its release, the movie made it to Top 10 Global Chart for Non-English Films

== Awards and nominations ==
Year	Award	Category	Film	Result	Ref
2023	Africa Magic Viewers' Choice Awards	Best Director	Man of God	Nominated	
2023	Africa Magic Viewers' Choice Awards	Best Costume Designer	Man of God	Nominated	

== Philanthropy ==
She founded Terra Academy For The Arts (TAFTA) in partnership with MasterCard foundation to train 65,000 young adults over five years. Terra Academy for the arts offers FREE education to its students in sound, stage and set design, animation and scriptwriting.

Austen-Peters has collaborated closely with the Nigerian Ministry of Culture to empower the creative industries through jobs and artistic projects. She was in 2015 recognised with the Award in Appreciation of Contribution to the Development of National Museum, Onikan, Lagos. In 2017, she collaborated with Lagos State Government to celebrate Lagos 50th anniversary. More than 9 sculptures were commissioned and placed around Lagos to bring light to the city’s history, culture and people. Perhaps the most well-known sculpture is Nigerian artist Abolore Sobayo’s sculpture of Afrobeat icon Fela Kuti. The sculpture salutes every Lagosian who has at one time or the other, fought for liberation. The sculpture is a celebration of Lagos and recognises the struggle of its citizens. Some of the other artists included in the project were Ade Odunfa, Hamza Atta, Segun Aiyesan, Umeh Bede, Gerald Chukwuma, Tayo Olayode and Terfa Adingi. She has been involved in the preservation and development of Nigerian languages throughout her career, and interviewed Nigerian author and Nobel Prize winner Wole Soyinka for the New York Times. Terra Kulture is collaborating with Mastercard Foundation to support 65,000 young creatives with job opportunities.

In 2021, Austen-Peters collaborated with Google Arts & Culture, the Nigerian Tourism Development Corporation (NTDC) and six cultural institutions to celebrate the city of Lagos and its creative communities. The project ‘Èkó for Show: Explore Lagos’ highlighted the young generation of talented individuals and communities spanning music, art, photography, fashion, theatre, literature and food. Terra Kulture contributed with Street View imagery, photographs, videos and immersive stories about Lagos cultural hub. For the project launch, Austen-Peters created a dedicated behind-the-scenes YouTube series with Afrobeats artists Teni, Kizz Daniel and Reekado Banks, explaining their creative journey.

== Personal life ==
She is married to Adegboyega Austen-Peters, a Nigerian executive and board member. They have a son and daughter, and live in Lagos, Nigeria.

== See also ==
- List of Nigerian actors
- List of Nigerian film producers
- List of Nigerian film directors
- Nollywood
