= Hazeezat =

- Directed by: Kabat Esosa Egbon
- Written by: Kehinde Olorunyomi-Odukoya
- Screenplay by: Kehinde Olorunyomi
- Starring: Mike Ezuruonye; Segun Arinze; Alex Ekubo; Mary Njoku
- Edited by: James Nduka
- Production company: Rok Studios
- Release date: December 2014
- Running time: 130 minutes
- Country: Nigeria
- Languages: English; Hausa

Hazeezat is a 2014 Nigerian drama film directed by Kabat Esosa Egbon, starring Mike Ezuruonye, Mary Njoku, Segun Arinze and Alex Ekubo. It was released in December 2014 on Irokotv website.

== Plot ==
The film starts with Hazeezat (Mary Njoku) leaving the hospital unhurt to the residence of her former love interest, Roberto (Mike Ezuruonye). Roberto happily accommodated her, to the distaste of his friend and house owner, Osita (Alex Ekubo). Osita and Hazeezat do not have a smooth relationship while at the university. Hazeezat's friend, Tamara (Mary Lazarus) visits her in front of Osita's home at the request of Hazeezat, and she began questioning her PIMP on the location of Alhaji (Segun Arinze), explaining that she had an unfinished business with him. It was revealed that Alhaji and Hazeezat has a fling that resulted to a pregnancy and he wanted the child aborted. Roberto expresses his renewed interest in Hazeezat, who declined on the premise that he isn't financially capable of taking care of her, however, Roberto accepted his fate but continued to show her love and promised to do more to secure a better job. Osita attempts to woo Hazeezat. Hazeezat reveals to Roberto that she's pregnant, this prompted him to increase the intensity of his job hunt. Hazeezat began living with Alhaji whose wife, Zainab (Sophia Muhammed) has gone abroad to deliver her child. Roberto continues to inquire about her whereabouts. On knowing that his wife, Zainab was expecting a female child, Alhaji started showing resentment towards his wife and favoured Hazeezat more, since she made him understand that she was having a male child. Due to the emotional trauma she faced from her husband and Hazeezat, Zainab lost her pregnancy and got separated from Alhaji. Hazeezat returns to Roberto, who is now employed and living in a house of his own. Alhaji's driver who took Hazeezat to the hospital for abortion disclosed that she didn't make it out of theater alive after his return from leave. They all arrived Roberto's home to inquire about Hazeezat, who was later revealed to have died about two months ago. Everyone present reflect on previous experiences they've had that suggests her supernatural nature through flashbacks.

== Cast ==
- Mary Njoku as Hazeezat
- Mike Ezuruonye as Roberto
- Segun Arinze as Alhaji
- Alex Ekubo as Osita
- Mary Lazarus as Tamara
- Sophia Muhammed as Zainab

== Reception ==
Talk African Movies commended the engaging nature of the film, particularly plot twists that contradicts previous parts in the film. It went further to state that "...took us on a curious ride of conspiracy and then suddenly dropped us off…at their destination not ours...". The acting and chemistry from Mike Ezuruonye and Mary Njoku was also praised as high-points in the film. Naij.com described the film as "amazing".
