= Hotels.ng =

Nigerian travel websites

- Founder: Mark Essien
- Type: Online travel/hotels booking agency
- Headquarters: Lagos, Nigeria
- Website: Hotels.ng

Hotels.ng is a Nigerian online hotels booking agency which was launched in 2013. The platform was founded by Mark Essien who hails from Akwa Ibom State, Nigeria and claims to list over 7,138 hotels from 320 cities in Nigeria.

== History ==
In 2012, while Mark Essien was studying for his MSc. in Computer Science at the Free University of Berlin, Germany, he developed an interest in the Nigerian technology space. His analysis showed that for an emerging market like Nigeria, a travel/tourism startup would work the quickest. Studying South American and Asian models of already-established hotels booking agencies, Mark tentatively created a hotels listing platform (which was what Hotels.ng was, initially.) He purchased a domain name and a list of hotels and put them up on the website.

This domain recorded enough traffic numbers to convince Mark to return to Nigeria from Germany. In Calabar, he continued to list more hotels. He partnered with a friend and they started taking photographs of hotels and signing agreements with as many hotels in Calabar as they could find.

As soon as they had enough hotels listed, bookings were enabled on Hotels.ng. Mark says that users began making reservations from the first day bookings were enabled.

=== Seed Fund ===
Shortly after the launch of Hotels.ng, Mark published a few press articles that caught the attention of Iroko TV's founder, Jason Njoku. At the time, he (Jason) was beginning a startup fund (Spark.ng) and looking for good internet businesses to invest in.

After negotiations, Spark.ng made a first investment of $75,000 in Hotels.ng which prompted Mark to move to Lagos to set up the platform there. A few months after the initial investment, the Spark fund made another investment of $150,000.

=== Startup Fund ===
On May 26, 2015, Hotels.ng received a $1.2 million startup funding from eBay founder Pierre Omidyar's Omidyar Network and from EchoVC Pan-African fund.

The funding follows from the announcement of a profitable 2014 in Hotels.ng, where the platform was said to have ostensibly made $40,000 in monthly revenue in the last half of the year.

=== Staff ===
Hotels.ng employs 49 locally-working staff in its Yaba office and outsources and crowdsources its data collection to freelance workers.

=== Expansion ===
In January 2018, Hotels.ng launched Hotel.africa and Fly.africa as part of its expansion plans across Africa.

== See also ==
- Mark Essien
