= Olusegun Adejumo =

Nigerian visual artist

- Born: 1965 (age 60–61); Lagos, Nigeria
- Education: Yaba College of Education

Olusegun Adejumo is a Nigerian visual artist, known for his female figure drawings and paintings. He is the director of One Draw Gallery and currently the president of the Guild of Professional Fine Artists Nigeria.

== Education, life and work ==
Adejumo was born on September 30, 1965, in Lagos. He attended the Yaba College of Education 1982 to 1987 and graduated with a Higher National Diploma (HND) in Painting. From 1987 to 1988, he served as a Painting Assistant Lecturer at the Lagos State Polytechnic. He also worked as an illustrator at the Advertising Techniques Limited in 1988. He has participated in several exhibitions, showing with other veteran Nigerian artists Ebenezer Akinola, George Edozie and Gerald Chukwuma.

== Exhibitions ==
=== Organised projects ===
- 2017: Union Bank Centenary Art Challenge. OneDraw Gallery in partnership with Union Bank of Nigeria PLC
- 2017: Co-curator Lagos state government team, 3-Day Art Exhibition Rasheed Gbadamosi Eko Art Expo, Lagos at 50

=== Selected solo exhibitions ===
- 2014: Emotions, Mydrim Gallery, Lagos
- 2011: Les Designs d' Olusegun Adejumo, City Mall, Lagos
- 2011: Ideal and Ideas, Nettatal Luxury, Port Harcourt
- 2010: Make a wish- fundraising exhibition in support of breast and cervical cancer, Bloom Project, City Hall, Lagos
- 2007: Expressions, Sandiland Arcade, VI Lagos
- 2004: Lately, Truview Gallery, Lagos
- 2004: The Drawing Room Project, Chapter One, Framemaster Gallery, Lagos
- 1998: On Request, American Embassy Guest House, Lagos
- 1994: Recent Paintings, Chevron Estate, Lagos
- 1994: Recent Paintings in Watercolour, Fenchurch Gallery, Lagos
- 1992: Diverse Siblings, Sans Culturel Francaise, Alliance Francais, Lagos
- 1992: Diverse Siblings, the club, Sheraton Hotels and Towers, Lagos

=== Selected group exhibitions ===
- 2016: Catharsis, Guild of Professional Fine Artists of Nigeria, Terra Kulture, Lagos
- 2016: Oreze IV, a group exhibition in honour of His Royal Majesty Nnaemeka Alfred Ugochukwu Achebe, Obi of Onitsha (Agbogidi)
- 2015: Art is Life (Promoting Nigerian Art and Culture), Total Village, Lagos
- 2015: Oreze IV, a group exhibition in honour of His Royal Majesty Nnaemeka Alfred Ugochukwu Achebe, Obi of Onitsha (Agbogidi)
- 2015: Infinite Treasures, Terra Kulture, Lagos
- 2014: Distinction 2, Terra Kulture, Lagos
- 2012: Nothing but the Truth, Mydrim Gallery, Lagos
- 2012: Togetherness, South-South Economic Summit, Asaba
- 2012: Imbued Essence, Exhibition of Contemporary Nigerian Paintings, Sculptures & Craft, London 2012 Olympic & Paralympic Games, Stratford
- 2010: Crux of the Matter, Guild of Professional Artists of Nigeria, Lagos
- 2010: Timeless, 10th Annual Pastel Exhibition, Mydrim Gallery, Lagos
- 2010: Ancient to Modern, Lagos State celebrating Nigeria at 50, Federal Palace Hotel, Lagos
- 2009: Colours of Hope, An Exhibition in Support of Children Living with Cancer Foundation, Artistic Licence Gallery, Lagos
- 2009: Walking with the Masters, Price Waterhouse Coopers, Lagos
- 2009: Besançon vu par Nina et Adejumo, Centre de Linguistique Appliqee, Universite de Frache Comte Besançon France
- 2009: Dialogue between Cultures, collaboration between Alliance Française and Society of Nigerian Artist, Lagos
- 2008: Threshold, Guild of Professional Artists of Nigeria, Lagos
- 2008: Art Expo, Lagos
- 2008: The Giclee Print Exhibition, Hue Concept, Terra Kulture, Lagos
- 2008: October Rain, The Society of Nigerian Artists, Lagos Chapter
- 2008: Colours of Hope, An Exhibition in Support of Children Living with Cancer Foundation, Lagos
- 2007: The Bond, Sachs Gallery, Lagos
- 2007: Colours of Hope, An Exhibition in Support of Children Living with Cancer Foundation, Terra Kulture, Lagos
- 2007: Little Treasures, Miniature Art Fair, Framemaster Ltd, Lagos
- 2007: Hellenic Images and Fifty Four Nigerian Artist in Translation, Greek Embassy, Lagos
- 2006: Premier Exposition, Watercolour Society of Nigeria, Terra Kulture, Lagos
- 2005: Rejuvenation, Society of Nigerian Artists, Mydrim Gallery, Lagos
- 2005: Concert of Five, Lifestrokes Gallery, Abuja
- 2005: 5th Annual Pastel Exhibition, Mydrim Gallery, Lagos
- 2004: Figure Drawings, Hourglass Gallery, Lagos
- 2004: The Matrix and the Muse, Framemaster Gallery, Lagos
- 2004: Selected for the 19th Annual Philadelphia Art Expo, October Gallery, US
- 2002: Highlights, 2nd Annual Pastel Exhibition, Mydrim Gallery, Lagos
- 2002: The Aso Rock Collection, African Foundation for the Arts, Lagos
- 2002: Jigida, The Great Room, Grosevenor House, Park Lane, London
- 2000: Take One Woman, Atrium Gallery, London
- 2000: First Light, Vermilion Gallery, Lagos
- 2000: Behind the Wall, Vermilion Gallery, Lagos
- 1998: From the Cradle, Yaba College of Education, Goethe Institute, Lagos
- 1997: Young Master Artist Club, Signature Gallery, Lagos
- 1997: Six Artist, Mydrim Gallery, Lagos
- 1994: Devine Inspiration, Mauba Gallery, Lagos
- 1994: Let it Flow, Mydrim Gallery, Lagos
- 1992: Myriads of Thoughts, Mydrim Gallery, Lagos
- 1991: A Splash of Colours, Terri's Food Chain, Lagos
- 1989: Nigerian Arts and Crafts, American Embassy, Lagos
- 1988: Collectives, Barnette Gallery, Lagos

=== Auctions ===
- 2013: Arthouse Contemporary Limited 'Modern and Contemporary Art', Lagos
- 2013: TKMG, Terra Kulture Mydrim Gallery, Lagos Art Auction
- 2011: TKMG, Terra Kulture Mydrim Gallery, Art Auction, Lagos
- 2011: Arthouse Contemporary Limited 'Modern and Contemporary Art', Lagos

=== Selected commissioned works ===
- Ceiling Fresco, Four Season Towers Aim Consultants (Elias Building on Ereko Street)
- Portrait of Professor Odunjo of Morbid Anatomy Department, Lagos University Teaching Hospital
- Portrait of 1988 Rotary President, Barrister Solaru, Rotary Club District 911

=== Selected workshop experience ===
- 2011: Living legends- Wole Soyinka, National Gallery of Arts, Lagos

=== Selected book illustrations ===
- No Supper for Eze, Farafina Educational Books, Kachifo Limited
- No School for Eze, Farafina Educational Books, Kachifo Limited
- Only Bread for Eze, Farafina Educational Books, Kachifo Limited

=== Selected speaking seminars ===
- 2012: Sharing my work experience, Obafemi Awolowo University, Ile-Ife
- 2011: Surviving as a Visual Artist in the 21st Century, Obafemi Awolowo University, Ile-Ife
- 2008: Nigerians at Work. The 3 Nigerian Art Stakeholders Conference of African Art Resource Centre (AARC)
- 2007: Young Artist and His Market Place- Swimming Against the Tide (Art Zero), National Gallery of Art, Lagos

=== Awards and residency ===
- 2016: Residency, West African Artist Collectives, Villa Karon kulttuurilehti, Grand Popo, Benin Republic
- 2015: Homage to Efua Nubuke Foundation East Legon, Accra, Ghana
- 2013: Residency, West African Artist Collectives, Villa Karon kulttuurilehti, Grand Popo, Benin Republic
- 2012: Residency, West African Artist Collectives, Villa Karon kulttuurilehti, Grand Popo, Benin Republic
- 2011: Residency, West African Artist Collectives, Villa Karon kulttuurilehti, Grand Popo, Benin Republic
- 1997: Shortlisted for the Common Wealth Fellowship Award
- 1984: Best Student in General Art, Yaba College of Technology, Gong Gallery Award

=== Affiliations and memberships ===
- Guild of Fine Artist Nigeria (GFAN)
- Society of Nigerian Artist (SNA)
- International Stone League, Nigeria (ISLN)
- Watercolour Society of Nigeria (WSN)
