= Mommie Dearest (disambiguation) =

Mommie Dearest is a 1978 memoir written by Christina Crawford.

Mommie Dearest, Mommy Dearest or Mummy Dearest may also refer to:

- Mommie Dearest (film), a 1981 film adaptation of the memoir
- "Mommie Dearest" (Scream Queens), a 2015 episode of the TV series Scream Queen
- "Mommie Dearest", a 2017 episode of the TV series Feud
- "Mommy Dearest" (Grimm), a 2014 episode of the TV series Grimm
- "Mommy Dearest", a 2007 episode of the TV series The Best Years
- Mommy, Dearest, alternative title of the 2005 South Korean film Bravo, My Life
- Mommy Dearest (TV series), a 2025 Philippine television drama
- Mummy Dearest (film), a 2015 Nigerian film
- "Mummy Dearest", a 1989 episode of the animated series Garfield and Friends
- "Mummy Dearest", a 1996 episode of the TV series Hercules: The Legendary Journeys
