= Becoming Abi =

2021 6-part limited series

- Genre: Nigerian drama series
- Directed by: Bolu Essien; Terrel Ejem
- Starring: Idowu Philips; Bolu Essien; Juliana Olayode; Stan Nze; Seun Ajayi; Biodun Stephen; Akah Nnani
- Country of origin: Nigeria
- Original language: English
- No. of seasons: 1
- No. of episodes: 6

Production
- Producer: Bolu Essien

Original release
- Network: Netflix
- Release: 28 October 2022

Becoming Abi is a 2021 Nigerian sitcom series created by Bolu Essien and inspired by the true life events of Bolu Essien in the Nigerian advertising industry. The six-part drama sitcom series was released to Netflix on 28 October 2022 and it stars Nollywood actors and actresses like Idowu Philips, Bolu Essien, Biodun Stephen, Stan Nze, Akah Nnani, Seun Ajayi, Juliana Olayode and others.

== Synopsis ==
The sitcom series features the story of Abi (played by Bolu Essien) who secures a job at a top advertising agency in Lagos, although she had a rough start with her superior, she soon got an opportunity to shine at work when she was promoted to become the acting manager after the manager travelled to another branch. The series features love, betrayal, office politicking, career goals and many more issues faced in the workplace, and how Abi was also able to scale through even when she was promoted to a permanent head role ahead of those she met at the office.

== Selected cast ==
- Bolu Essien as Abiodun (Abi)
- Idowu Philips as Big Mummy
- Juliana Olayode as Joyce
- Stan Nze as Mike
- Seun Ajayi as Israel
- Ifeanyi Kalu as MD
- Biodun Stephen as Shade
- Akah Nnani as Daniel
- Benita Okojie Adeyina as Bimbo
- April Oshidipe as Shai

== Episodes ==
No.	Title	Directed by	Written by	Original release date
1	"Am I ready?"	Bolu Essien and Terrel Ejem	Bolu Essien	October 28, 2022
Young and creative Abi secure a job at the most prestigious advertising agency in Lagos. After a rough start, she soon gets an unexpected chance to shine after she gave an outstanding presentation that helped the company secure a large deal.
2	"The New Boss Arrives"	Bolu Essien and Terrel Ejem	Bolu Essien	October 28, 2022
A demanding new manager leaves Abi scrambling to organize a party for a wealthy client. The only problem is, she has never planned an event before. She soon gets frustrated after her boss gave credit of her work to another employee (out of nepotism)
3	"To Leave or Not!"	Bolu Essien and Terrel Ejem	Bolu Essien	October 28, 2022
Following the treatment from her boss, Abi decides to leave and starts job-hunting, but just as she starts, she gets promoted to become the acting manager, as new role comes in, comes new responsibility as Abi sought to hire an intern who in turn cost the company one of their biggest client.
4	"Love Tingles"	Bolu Essien and Terrel Ejem	Bolu Essien	October 28, 2022
Abi and Israel (a colleague at work) soon decides to explore a relationship, but working closely with a handsome new client got Abi to start questioning her feelings for Israel.
5	"Leading is Easy?"	Bolu Essien and Terrel Ejem	Bolu Essien	October 28, 2022
Israel finally meets Big Mommy (Abi’s guardian). Abi faces opposition from friends and colleagues in her new role as Manager. A client drops a big bombshell which is going to make the company miss a big deal.
6	"Meet the cast and professionals"	Bolu Essien and Terrel Ejem	Bolu Essien	October 28, 2022
The cast shares their thoughts on the characters in the show and their perspectives on millennial experiences in the corporate world

== Release ==
The six-part series inspired by true life events was released to Netflix on 28 October 2022 and the series has been supported by companies in Nigeria including Gala, Supa Komando, Glover and Essenza.
