= Mark Essien =

Nigerian entrepreneur

Mark Anthony Essien
- Born: 18 December 1980 (age 45); Ikot Ekpene, Akwa Ibom State
- Occupations: Entrepreneur, software developer
- Known for: Founding Hotels.ng
- Title: CEO of Hotels.ng
- Website: www.markessien.com

Mark Anthony Essien (born 18 December 1980 in Ikot Ekpene, Akwa Ibom State) is a Nigerian entrepreneur, software developer and startup investor. He is the founder and CEO of Hotels.ng, one of the first online hotel booking websites in Nigeria. Before he founded Hotels.ng in 2013, Essien had previously built a file-sharing software called Gnumm (acquired by Snoopstar.com), followed by a language learning startup called Ingolingo.

== Career ==
=== Hotels.ng ===
In 2013, Essien founded Hotels.ng. Spark.ng made an initial investment of $75,000 and another investment of $150,000.

In 2015, the company secured additional investment of $1.2 million from international investors EchoVC Pan-Africa Fund, a seed-stage technology fund, and Omidyar Network, the investment vehicle of eBay founder Pierre Omidyar.

Essien stepped down as the CEO of HNG Internships, a programme he founded to solve the Nigerian software engineering talent problem. He handed over to Seyi Onifade

== Awards and recognition ==
In 2015, Essien made the Forbes list of the 30 youngest entrepreneurs in Africa. He has also been nominated for the Nigeria Future awards amongst others.

== Family ==
On 8 April 2018, Essien married Jenni Naiaretti, who is also a developer.

== Investments ==
In 2016, Hotels.ng co-invested with Jason Njoku and Spark in OgaVenue, an events booking platform. Essien serves as a director on the board of OgaVenue.

== Public talks ==
Essien is a frequent TEDx speaker. He has delivered talks on leveraging networks to build a business and how Africa can lead in the global technology space, speaking at TEDxEuston and TEDxGbagada respectively.

== See also ==
- Hotels.ng
