= Rok Studios =

Nigerian film entertainment company

- Type: Subsidiary
- Industry: Entertainment
- Founded: August 2013; 13 years ago
- Founder: Mary Remmy Njoku
- Headquarters: Nigeria
- Key people: Mary Remmy Njoku (director general)
- Products: Feature films Television series
- Parent: iROKO Partners (2013–2019); StudioCanal (2019–present)

Rok Studios is a Nigerian film production company. Its production studios is based in Anthony Village, Lagos. The company was founded in August 2013 by Mary Remmy Njoku. In addition to its numerous films, Rok Studios has produced over 12 TV series.

Notable productions from Rok Studios include: Hazeezat (2014), Thy Will Be Done, Festac Town,–TV Series (2014), and A Northern Affair (2014) (all of which were produced by Mary Njoku).

Mary Njoku launched ROK on Sky, a network airing across the UK at the Nigerian High Commission in the UK in 2016.

In July 2019, ROK was acquired by Canal+ Group from iROKO Partners. Mary Njoku stays on as director general of ROK under the Canal+ acquisition.

On 23 November 2022, ROK United Kingdom launched a streamed service on Freeview channel 280.

== 2013–2014 releases ==
| Release date | Title | Notes |
|---|---|---|
| 2014 | Festac Town | Produced by Mary Remmy Njoku |
| 2014 | Raging Passion | Produced by Mary Remmy Njoku |
| 2014 | Hazeezat | Produced by Mary Remmy Njoku |
| 2015 | Stolen Waters | Produced by Mary Remmy Njoku |
| 2014 | A Northern Affair | Production Finance |
| 2014 | A Trip To Hell | Production Finance |
| 2014 | Cheaters Vacation | Co-production |
| 2014 | Family Album | Co-production |
| 2013 | False | Co-production |
| 2014 | Wicked Love | Co-production |
| 2013 | Finding Mercy | Co-production |
| 2013 | Somewhere in Africa | Co-production |
| 2013 | Forgetting June | Co-production |
| 2014 | Broken Mirror | Co-production |
| 2014 | 2014 Prince of Barmah | Co-production |
| 2014 | Forbidden Choice | Co-production |
| 2014 | If You Were Mine | Co-production |
| 2014 | Nkuli | Co-production |
| 2013 | Crime Suspect | Co-production |
| 2013 | In Her Shoes | Co-production |
| 2014 | Mother's Error | Co-production |
| 2014 | Chibundu | Co-production |

== 2015–2025 releases ==
| Release date | Title | Major Cast |
|---|---|---|
| 2015 | Thy Will Be Done | |
| 2015 | Losing Control | |
| 2015 | Poisoned Bait | Gideon Okeke, Marie Humbert, Mary Remmy Njoku, Adjetey Anang, John Dumelo, and Ama K. Abebrese |
| 2015 | Husbands of Lagos | |
| 2015 | Desperate Housegirls | |
| 2016 | Stalemate | |
| 2016 | Aso Ebi | |
| 2017 | Single Ladies | |
| 2022 | April | Franca Brown, Okonkwo Uchechi Treasure, Bayray McNwizu and Diamond Okechi |
| 2023 | Daddy’s angles | Uzee Usman, Uchechi Treasure Okonkwo and Queen Benedicta Akpana |
| 2023 | Dry Leaves | |
| 2023 | One in a Million | |
| 2023 | Iman | Uzee Usman, Uchechi Treasure Okonkwo, Stanley Igboanugo |
| 2024 | Ahanna | Zulu Adigwe, Andy Ike, Joyce Kalu, Obi Okoli, and Okonkwo Uchechi Treasure |
