= Iman (film) =

- Official poster
- Directed by: John-Jayci Walters
- Written by: Gift Collins
- Produced by: Uzee Usman; Bestman Thompson; Mary Njoku
- Starring: Uzee Usman; Uchechi Treasure Okonkwo; Jennifer Martins; Victor Chude
- Production company: Rok Studios
- Distributed by: Nollywood TV
- Release date: 15 April 2023
- Running time: 93 minutes
- Country: Nigeria
- Languages: English; Igbo

Iman is a 2023 Nigerian drama film directed by John Jaycee and produced by Uzee Usman, Bestman Thompson, and Mary Njoku for ROK Studios. The film stars Uchechi Treasure, Ikenna Azubuike, Stanley Igboanugo, Martins Onyebuchi, and Uzee Usman in leading roles. The story addresses the challenges faced by young girls in North East (Nigeria) who aspire to obtain an education despite entrenched cultural obstacles.

Iman was released theatrically on 15 April 2023, distributed by Nollywood TV, and received mixed critical responses.

== Synopsis ==
Iman tells the story of a young girl from North East (Nigeria) who dreams of going to school, even though her father and mother’s believes that educating daughters is pointless. Every day, she secretly sneaks up to lessons from outside the classroom window. Her struggle becomes even more difficult when her parents arranged for her to marry the son of a wealthy man, threatening to shut down her dreams entirely. Iman eventually crosses paths with a woman who endured similar struggles and managed to overcome them. With this mentor’s guidance and support, Iman begins to believe that a different future might be possible.

== Cast ==
- Uchechi Treasure as Iman
- Uzee Usman
- Victor Chude
- Martha Felix
- Ikenna Azubuike
- Stanley Igboanugo
- Abi Elijah Iji
- Asabe Madaki
- Jennifer Martins
- Ransome Nuhu
- Martins Onyebuchi
- Rabiu Rikadawa
- Abdul U. Zada

== Production ==
=== Casting ===
In March 2023, ROK Studios announced Uchechi Treasure and Uzee Usman as the lead actors in the film. Additional cast members confirmed that month included Ikenna Azubuike, Stanley Igboanugo, Jennifer Martins, Ransome Nuhu, Abdul U. Zada, and Martins Onyebuchi.

== Release and reception ==
Iman was released in Nigeria on April 15, 2023 via ROK2 on Dstv and distributed by Nollywood TV.

This Day Nigeria gave the film 4/5 stars, describing the film as powerful, thought-provoking film that blends emotional storytelling with strong performances and impactful social commentary. Oluchi Favour Chinedu of The Guardian praised the film as a story of resilience, education, and breaking barriers.
