= IROKO Partners =

iROKO Partners
- Company type: Private
- Founded: Lagos, Lagos State, Nigeria
- No. of locations: Lagos, London, New York City
- Founder: Jason Njoku
- Industry: Internet video and audio
- Products: iROKOtv, iROKING, NollywoodLove, YorubaLove & iROKtv
- Employees: 110
- Website: http://www.irokopartners.com

iROKO Partners is an online media distribution company focused on the Nigerian entertainment industry. The company was established in September 2010 and is headquartered in Lagos, with a branch in London, United Kingdom. The company is led by its co-founders Jason Njoku (CEO) and Bastian Gotter along with major investor Nazar Yasin. iROKO Partners offers a range of online media products including its movie streaming website named IROKOtv focused on Nollywood Film productions, and 'iROKING', a Nigerian music streaming platform. Other web brands are NollywoodLove and YorubaLove which operate on the YouTube video platform.

== History ==
iROKO Partners was founded in 2010 in London, England by Jason Njoku and Bastian Gotter. The Idea was born out of the high and rapidly growing demand for Nollywood films. iROKO partners initially set out to rid both the internet and the industry from the vast amount of piracy which was crippling the industry; once established, the organization birthed Nollywoodlove and Yorubalove, which obtained a dominant share of local YouTube views in 2011. Just four months into his business, Njoku had bought the online rights to 500 movies from 100 one-man production houses.

The company is globally the largest licensor and the leading distributor of Nollywood movies (both English and Yoruba) online. Tiger Global, a hedge fund run by an early investor in Facebook and Zynga, has invested $8 million into the company. In 2012, iROKO Partners was the fastest-growing internet company in Nigeria, was YouTube's biggest African partner, and had distribution deals with Dailymotion, iTunes, Amazon and Vimeo.

== iROKING ==
iROKING was a free Nigerian music streaming service that offered streaming of selected music from a range of African labels and artists. Its website platform was launched in December 2011 by iROKO Partners. Music could be browsed by direct searches, artist, album and playlists. Until 2019, the system was accessible using Microsoft Windows and Mac OS X. It is no longer active as of 2020.

=== Mobile application ===
iROKING had mobile applications on the iOS, Android, Windows and Symbian (Nokia) mobile handsets. The application allowed access to thousand of the latest Nigerian tracks and stream songs over Wi-Fi or 3G.

The iROKING mobile application's features included:

- Favourite selected songs
- Create playlists and share them via Twitter or Facebook
- Integrated offline functionality (users could listen to favourite tunes offline)
