= Nollywood Travel Film Festival =

Annual Nigeria film festival and awards

- Location: Toronto, Glasgow, Canada, Italy, Amsterdam
- Founded: 2017; 9 years ago
- Founded by: Mykel Parish
- Awards: Nollywood Travel Film Festival Award
- Language: International
- Website: nollywoodtravelfestival.org

Current: 2024
- 2025 2023

The Nollywood Travel Film Festival (NTFF) is an annual film festival established to promote Nigerian films to international audiences.

== History ==
The Nollywood Travel Film Festival was founded in 2017 by Mykel Parish, The festival was established to promote Nigerian cinema, music, and tourism to international audiences. Its first edition was held in Toronto, Canada, from 5 to 7 May 2017.

The 2018 edition was held in Atlanta, Georgia, where filmmakers and actors got together for film screenings. The festival has also taken place in cities such as Atlanta, Hamburg, Berlin, Glasgow, Helsinki, Paris, Oslo, Amsterdam, Lima, Italy, and Athens.

The 2022 edition took place in Athens from May 27- 29, focusing on the theme "Experience Nollywood." With support from the Nigerian mission in Greece and various organizations, including the Association of Movie Producers, the Directors Guild of Nigeria, and the Actors Guild of Nigeria.

=== Notable film premieres ===
Films screened or premiered at the Nollywood Travel Film Festival (NTFF) have included Kada River, Alter Ego, Dear Affy, Isoken, The Women, We Don’t Live Here Anymore, Collision Course, Citation (film), Eagle Wings, 10 Days in Sun City, Catch.er, Lotanna, Lost in London, Excess Luggage, Esohe, Mansoor, Oloibiri, Unveil, Slow Country, and Lockdown.

=== Notable award recipient ===
Omotola Jalade-Ekeinde received the Best Actress award for her role in Alter Ego, while Richard Mofe-Damijo was recognized with an award for Most Outstanding Individual in Nollywood. In 2024, Uchechi Treasure received the NTFF Best Teen Actress Award.

== Events and activities ==
- Film Screenings
- Panel Discussions
- Workshops
- Awards Ceremonies

== Awards ==
2017 Nollywood Travel Film Festival Awards

Awards
Award	Winner
Best Actress	Omotola Jalade-Ekeinde from the film Alter Ego

2018 Nollywood Travel Film Festival Awards

Category Awards
Award	Winner
Most Outstanding Individual	Richard Mofe-Damijo
Best Screenplay	Ike Nnaebue
Best Music Score	Michael Truth Ogunlade from the film The Encounter
Best Cinematographer	Adekunle Nodash from the film The Encounter
Best Nollywood Film in Diaspora	A little too late
Best Producer	Neville Sajere from the film A little too late
Best Actress	Queen Nwokoye
Best Actor	Kalu Ikeagwu
Best Director	Niyi Akinmolayan from the film The Wedding Party 2
Best Nigerian Film	The Wedding Party 2

2024 Nollywood Travel Film Festival Awards

Awards
Award	Winner
Best Teen Actress	Uchechi Treasure Okonkwo (Nigeria)

== Chronology of NTFF ==
Edition	Year	Venue	Competitive
1st	12 – 16 September 2017	Toronto, Canada	Yes
2nd	9 – 13 May 2018	Hamburg, Germany	Yes
3rd	October 2018	University of Toronto	Yes
4th	23 February 2020	Glasgow	Yes
5th	5 – 7 October 2023	Amsterdam, Netherlands	Yes
6th	14 –17 January 2024	Milan, Italy	Yes
7th	15 – 19 May 2024	Athens, Greece	Yes
