= Man of God (2022 film) =

Nigerian film

- Directed by: Bolanle Austen-Peters
- Screenplay by: Shola Dada
- Produced by: Bolanle Austen-Peters; James Amuta; Joseph Umoibom
- Starring: Akah Nnani; Osas Ighodaro; Jude Chukwuka; Dorcas Shola-Fapson; Ayo Mogaji
- Production company: BAP Productions
- Distributed by: Netflix
- Release date: 16 April 2022
- Running time: 111 minutes
- Country: Nigeria
- Language: English

Man of God is a 2022 Nigerian film produced and directed by Bolanle Austen-Peters and starring Akah Nnani, Osas Ighodaro, Dorcas Shola-Fapson, Prince Nelson Enwerem, Atlanta Bridget Johnson, Jude Chukwuka, Olumide Oworu, Mawuli Gavor and many others. Loosely inspired by the biblical story The Prodigal Son,Man of God was released on Netflix on 16 April 2022 as Bolanle Austen-Peters first Netflix branded film.

== Plot ==
After growing weary of his strict religious upbringing, Samuel Obalolu leaves his parents' household for university where he completely deviates from Christianity and fronts an Afrobeat band. His friends include backing singer Rekya with whom he has the occasional no-strings dalliance, and childhood friend Teju. Samuel falls for Teju's close friend Joy, and the pair grow close after he regularly attends fellowship group to impress her, infuriating Teju who is secretly in love with him.

Joy is angry and confused after campus chaplain Pastor BJ reveals that Samuel's father is televangelist Josiah Obalolu, but Samuel gradually wins her back. She graduates a year before him and begins her youth service in Abuja, but promises their relationship would endure the distance. When her emails become less frequent, Pastor BJ reveals Joy is now married to Zach, an Abuja-based preacher Joy had first met at her fellowship's graduation event. Samuel is depressed and heartbroken, and with Rekya no longer present having dropped out of university, he finds solace in Teju.

Nine years later, Samuel - now in a rebound marriage with Teju - is a worship leader at their new church, but constantly clashes with the bishop's wife who disapproves of his secularity. After the bishop questions his promiscuity with female church members, Samuel heatedly resigns from his position. Teju later discovers that Josephine - Samuel's secret mistress from church - has aborted her pregnancy, and the revelation places a strain on their marriage. When Rekya returns to Nigeria after a sojourn abroad where she has dealt in drug trafficking and organ trade, Samuel reinvents himself as a Christian minister under the moniker "Sammy King" and joins Rekya's business; both ventures established to reap financial gain.

Samuel's estranged brother Daniel informs him that their mother, who had spent her last years pining for her prodigal son, has died, but warns him to repent. Samuel also reconnects with Joy when her husband Zach joins his church as a sound engineer. Samuel begs her to leave Zach for him, but she refuses, and he is devastated when the police inform him that Rekya has died. After Teju discovers her husband plans to leave for Canada without her, she takes revenge by reporting his illegal involvement in Rekya's criminal activity to the authorities. Josephine's sister had previously informed the police of the abortion which had led to her death, and Samuel is finally arrested.

After his release from prison, Samuel walks into his father's church and finds the latter preaching. Josiah recognises his son, and along with Daniel, welcomes him home with open arms.

== Selected cast ==
- Akah Nnani as Samuel Obalolu/Sammy King
- Osas Ighodaro as Teju Williams
- Bridget Atlanta Johnson as Joy
- Dorcas Shola-Fapson as Rekya
- Jude Chukwuka as Josaiah Obalolu
- Ayo Mogaji as Mummy Samuel
- Olumide Oworu as Daniel Obalolu
- Patrick Doyle as Bishop Asuquo
- Eucharia Anunobi as Mummy Bishop Asuquo
- Mawuli Gavor as Pastor Zach
- Prince Nelson Enwerem as Pastor BJ
- Shawn Faqua as Brother Nonso
- Bunmi Aboderin as Mummy Tobi
- Toluwalashe Adeleke as Sister Josephine
- Boluwatife Aderogba as Diane
- Nifemi Lawal - Young Samuel
- Bolanle Austen-Peters as herself

== Premiere ==
Man of God was premiered on Sunday, 10th April 2022 at the Terra Kulture Arena in Victoria Island, Lagos, the theme of the premiere was "Heavenly Glam" as the premiere saw the cast, friends, celebrities dress in line with the selected theme. The premiere was star-studded as it was anchored jointly by broadcaster, Laila Johnson-Salami, and OAP Olisa Adibua, in attendance was the former First Bank of Nigeria's Chairman, Ibukun Awosika, Former Lagos State Commissioner for Information Tourism and Culture, Steve Ayorinde popular actresses, Joke Silva, Hilda Dokubo, Ireti Doyle. Nigerian Actors and Actresses such as Daniel Etim Effiong, Erica Nlewedim, Deyemi Okanlawon, Tade Ogidan, Denrele Edun among others also graced the premiere occasion.

== Awards and nominations ==
Year	Award	Category	Recipient(s)	Result	Ref
2023	Africa Magic Viewers' Choice Awards	Best Actress In A Drama, Movie Or TV Series	Osas Ighodaro	Won	
2023	Africa Magic Viewers' Choice Awards	Best Costume Designer	Bolanle Austen-Peters, Clement Effanga, Juliana Dede	Nominated	
2023	Africa Magic Viewers' Choice Awards	Best Director	Bolanle Austen-Peters	Nominated	
