= This Very Christmas =

2024 film by John Osemeke

- Release poster
- Directed by: John Osemeke
- Written by: Eze Ogechi Patience
- Produced by: Chijioke Okonkwo; Eze Ogechi Patience
- Starring: Patience Ozokwor; Uchechi Treasure Okonkwo; Toosweet Annan; Victoria Eze; Chidi Nwachukwu
- Cinematography: Promise Obiesie; Ndubuisi Uzochukwu
- Edited by: Ojo Emmanuel
- Music by: Uchechi Treasure
- Production companies: Boldline Entertainment; Adakirikiri Tv
- Distributed by: Africa Magic
- Release date: 20 December 2024
- Running time: 106 minutes
- Country: Nigeria
- Language: English

This Very Christmas is a 2024 Nigerian christmas family drama film directed by John Osemeke and written by Eze Ogechi Patience. It stars Patience Ozokwor, Uchechi Treasure Okonkwo, Chinaza Victoria Eze, Toosweet Annan, Fidelis Ogbonnaya, Victoria Eze, Prince Nebo, and Loveday Daniel.

Former school rivals Kathie and Biancay reunite under one roof for the holidays, hoping for a warm and joyful family Christmas. The film was released by African Magic on 20 December 2024.

== Synopsis ==
This Very Christmas follows the story of Kathie and Bianca, former schoolmates and long-time rivals, who unexpectedly reunite at their grandmother’s house during the holiday season. Hoping for a peaceful and joyful Christmas, both women are instead confronted with lingering tensions from the past. As family secrets come to light and emotional confrontations unfold, the festive atmosphere gives way to conflict and revelation. Amid the turmoil, the two women uncover an unexpected bond that connects them in complex and heartfelt ways, challenging their perceptions and offering a chance at reconciliation.

== Cast ==
- Patience Ozokwor as Caro
- Uchechi Treasure Okonkwo as Kathie
- Chinaza Victoria Eze as Bianca
- Toosweet Annan as James
- Victoria Eze as Monica
- Prince Nebo as Nduka
- Chidi Nwachukwu as Ikenna
- Fidelis Ogbonnaya as Titus

== Production ==
The film was directed by John Osemeke and written and co-produced by Eze Ogechi Patience. It was executive produced by Chijioke Okonkwo under his company, BoldLine Entertainment. The original music was composed by Uchechi Treasure.

Principal photography took place in early 2024.

== Release and reception ==
The film was released on African Magic on December 20, 2024.

Pleasure Okezie of the Daily Times of Nigeria described This Very Christmas as a refreshing take on holiday films, noting its effective blend of drama, humor, and emotional moments. While she observed that certain scenes felt somewhat predictable, she praised the film's emotional depth and strong performances, particularly highlighting Patience Ozokwor, Uchechi Treasure Okonkwo, and Eze Victoria Chinaza. Okezie awarded the film a rating of four out of five stars.

Writing for The Guardian, Queen Onuoha praised the film's screenplay, describing it as "sharp, emotional, and packed with moments that hit close to home." She noted that what sets This Very Christmas apart is its ability to balance drama with humor and tenderness, creating a well-rounded and engaging viewing experience.
