= Mike Godson =

Nigerian actor (born 1985)

- Born: Michael Godson Ifeanyichukwu; October 10, 1985 (age 41); Kano State, Nigeria
- Education: University of Jos
- Occupation: Actor
- Years active: 2009–present
- Notable work: 7 Books of Moses
- Website: www.mikegodson.org

Michael Godson Ifeanyichukwu, better known as Mike Godson (born October 10, 1985) is a Nigerian actor. He was born in Kano State, located in the northwestern region of Nigeria but hails from Imo State, southeastern Nigeria.

== Early life and education ==
Godson studied at the University of Jos, Plateau State and holds a bachelor's degree in theater and film arts.

== Career ==
Mike Godson began acting in 2009 and has since become known for interpreting love roles in Nollywood. Godson has appeared in over 100 films. He has featured alongside actors such as Pete Edochie, Clem Ohameze, Kenneth Okonkwo, Van Vicker and John Dumelo. He got noticed in 2015 after he did the movie titled 7 Books of Moses. In 2018, Godson signed a deal with a Bollywood production team linked to Zee World. Godson invested in a venture business in 2018, which at the time exported agriculture products to Ivory Coast. Although his acting career did provide him his basic needs, Godson has repeatedly suggested that it might not granted him financial security. He was appointed youth ambassador by the Independent National Electoral Commission (INEC) in 2015.

== Controversy ==
In April 2020, Godson was criticized for ridiculing poor Nigerians during the COVID-19 pandemic lockdowns.

== Filmography ==
- Secret Of Riches
- Love and Jealousy (2023)
- Dirty Reflection (2022) as Rebel
- Greener Lawn (2022) as Chiedu
- A Soldier's Heart (2022) as Bayo
- Missing (2021) as Nedu
- Fading Blues (2020) as Steve
- 7 Book Of Moses
- 6 Months Madness (2018) as Alex
- The Shop Girl (2019) as Emeka
- Guilty (2019) as Daniel
- London Fever (2017) as Ade
- Put a Ring on It (2017) as Toba
- The Boss Is Mine (2016) as Oga
- Circle of Trust (2016) as Mike
- Mama's Love (2015) as Tata
- Lost Pride (2015) as Mark
- Caught in the Act (2014) as Yinka
- The Real Deal (2015)
- Amuma (2015)

== Awards and nominations ==
Year	Award ceremony	Prize	Result	Ref
2018	Best of Nollywood Awards	Best Actor in a Lead Role - English	Nominated	
