= Mary Njoku =

Nigerian actress (born 1985)

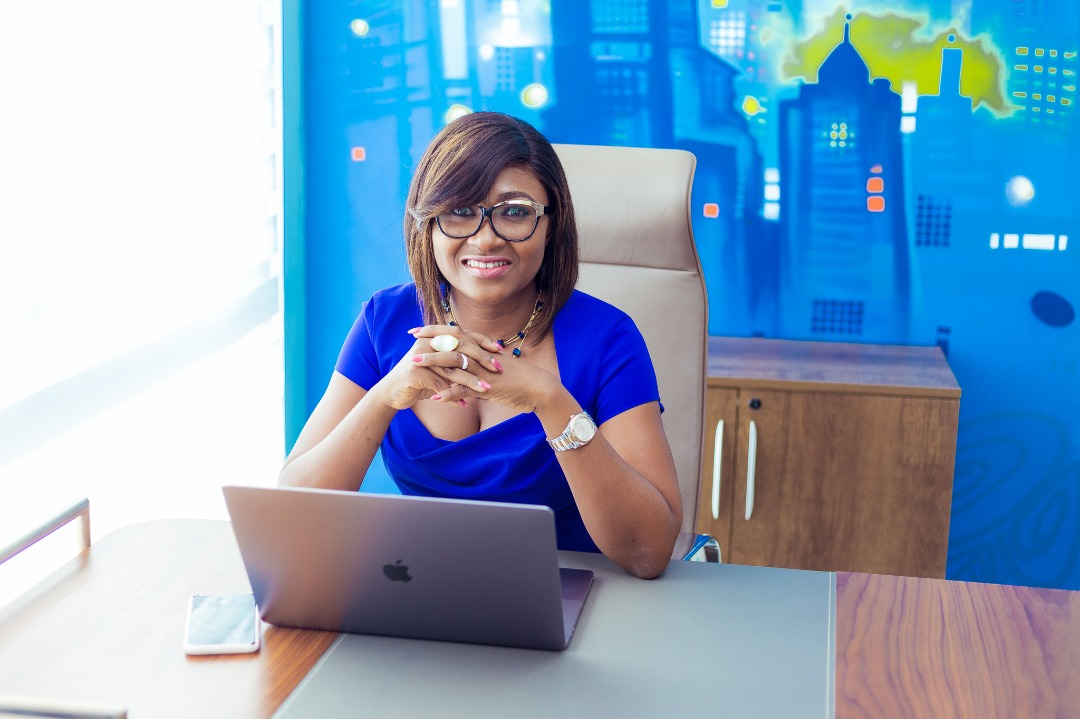
- Njoku in 2019
- Born: 20 March 1985 (age 41); Lagos, Nigeria
- Education: Lagos State University
- Occupations: Actress; producer
- Years active: 2003–present
- Spouse: Jason Njoku (m. 2012)
- Children: 3

Mary Remmy Njoku // (born 20 March 1985) is a Nigerian actress, producer, content creator and founder of the ROK TV Channels and CEO of ROK Studios, which she founded in 2013. With a catalogue of over three thousand (3000) hours of original content produced, that includes movies and TV series, ROK has in a short span become a leading producer of family friendly content and entertainment.

Njoku has overseen the growth of the brand ROK with its first channel, ROK on Sky launched in 2016 in the UK. She subsequently launched ROK on DSTV, a network airing across Africa, in the same year. In April 2018, Njoku launched two new Pan-African channels, ROK2 and ROK3, as well as ROKGH for Ghanaian viewers.

In 2019, French TV giant Canal+ acquired ROK Studios from iROKO Partners in what was reported to be the biggest media acquisition in Sub-Saharan Africa at the time. In keeping Njoku on as Managing Director, Canal+ Chief Content Officer Fabrice Faux was quoted as saying “We will provide administrative support, finance and equipment, but otherwise it is our intention to give Mary maximum autonomy and creative freedom".

At the time of the acquisition, ROK Studios had produced 540 movies and 25 original TV series, according to company data.

== Early life and education ==
Mary Remmy Njoku, who is the sixth child in a family of eight, was born in Amuwo Odofin, Lagos, Nigeria. She is from Nsukka, Enugu State. She attended Amuwo Odofin High School, National College Bagada and Navy Town Secondary School. She holds a diploma in computer science. From 2010, Njoku attended Lagos State University where she studied for a degree in English Language. In 2012, Njoku attended London Film Academy in the United Kingdom funded by her husband where she did a course on Producing: Movie Magic Budgeting and Schedule. From childhood, she had a passion for acting and started acting on stage when she was in Secondary school. Njoku joined the Nollywood industry in 2003, at the age of 17. Njoku unlike many, thinks education is just a pastime as the most important thing is your skills.

== Career ==
Njoku made her acting debut in the 2004 Nollywood movie Home Sickness, which she featured alongside Chioma Chukwuka Akpotha. She came to limelight after featuring in popular Nollywood blockbuster Blackberry Babes in 2011. Between 2011 and 2013, Njoku produced iROKtv, a YouTube platform that featured interviews with Nigerian celebrities, as well as coverage of Afrobeats and Nollywood events. In 2015, Njoku became the chief content officer at IROKO Partners. By March, she held her first world premier for her film Thy Will Be Done at the BFI IMAX London, the first ever Nollywood film premiere in IMAX. In August 2018, Njoku produced the movie Nwanyioma, where her role required her to completely shave her head. In 2023, she co-created the movie Dr. Love with Uche Jumbo.

== ROK Studios ==
In August 2013, Njoku founded ROK Studios. As of 2019, ROK has produced over 540 films and 25 original TV series, including Festac Town, Single Ladies, Body language, Losing Control and Husbands of Lagos. In 2016, Njoku launched ROK on Sky, a network airing across the UK. To celebrate the launch, some of her Nollywood colleagues attended the launch gala which took place at the Nigerian High Commission in the UK. Njoku also launched ROK on DSTV, a network airing across Africa, in the same year. In April 2018, ROK Studios launched two new channels, ROK2 and ROK3, to meet growing demand of ROK on DSTV. ROK2 delivers content showcasing the origins of Nollywood, while ROK3 showcases a variety of Ghanaian talent, and has a music channel feature in addition to the 24hr movie and series selection. In 2019, Njoku oversaw the acquisition of ROK to Canal+, the largest international deal to-date for a Nollywood brand.

== Spark ==
In August 2013, alongside her business partners Jason Njoku and Bastian Gotter, Njoku launched a $2 million investment vehicle for Lagos-based Internet start-ups called Spark.

== Personal life ==
Njoku married British-born Nigerian entrepreneur, and African start-up investor, Jason Njoku, in Festac Town, Lagos on 18 August 2012, in front of family, friends and colleagues. They welcomed their first son, Jason Obinna Njoku, on 30 July 2013, a second child Nwakaego Annabelle Njoku, was born on 24 August 2015 and they welcomed their third, Amber Nnenna Njoku on 4 August 2017.

== Filmography ==
=== Featured Films ===
- Ada Mbano (2014)
- Stolen Waters (2015)
- Birthmark (2015)
- Thy Will Be Done (2015)
- Ward 305 (2016)
- North East (2016)
- Picture Perfect (2016)
- Raging Passion (2014)
- Nwanyioma (2018)
- Ojukwu (2018)
- The African Couple (2019)
- Strangers
- A Little White Lie
