= Ime Bishop Umoh =

Nigerian actor and comedian (born 1983)

- Born: 30 August 1983 (age 43); Nsit Ibom, Akwa Ibom State, Nigeria
- Other name: Okon Lagos
- Education: University of Uyo
- Occupations: Actor, comedian
- Spouse: Idara Bishop (m. 2013)
- Children: (2)

Ime Bishop Umoh (often called Okon Lagos) is a Nigerian actor and comedian.

== Early life, education and career ==
Ime Bishop is an Ibibio from Nsit Ibom, Akwa Ibom State in the southern part of Nigeria. He graduated from the University of Uyo where he studied Philosophy. He started his acting career since his childhood, and he has featured in over 100 movies. The movie that brought him to the limelight was an indigenous movie, "Uyai", which was produced by Emem Isong in 2008. it was tough for him when he lost his mum.

== Endorsement ==
- He is a brand ambassador for GLO Nigeria.

== Political appointment ==
The comic actor in 2016 was appointed as a special assistant to the Governor of Akwa Ibom State, Udom Gabriel Emmanuel on Ethical and Social Reorientation.

== Awards and nominations ==
Year	Event	Prize	Recipient	Result
2012	Best of Nollywood Awards	Comedy Movie of the year	Okon lagos 2	Won
2013	Best of Nollywood Awards	Comedy of the year	Okon goes to school	Won
2013	Best of Nollywood Awards	Best Actor in Supporting Role	Udeme Mmi	Won
2014	Best of Nollywood Awards	Best Comedy of the year	I come lagos	Won
2016	Nigeria Teen Choice Awards	Comic Actor of the year(English)		Nominated
2016	Africa Magic Viewers Choice Awards	Best Actor in a comedy	Caught in the Act	Nominated
2017	Africa Magic Viewers Choice Awards	Best Actor In Comedy	The Boss is Mine	Won

== Films ==
Year	Title	Role
2008	Uyai	
2009	Edikan	Pastor
2009	Silent Scandals	Akpan
2010	Bursting Out	Daniel
2011	The Head Office	
2011	Vulcanizer	
2011	Okon Lagos	Okon
2012	Udeme mmi	
2012	Okon goes to school	Okon
2012	Sak Sio	
2013	Jump and pass	Edem
2013	The place	
	The champion	
2014	Okon the driver	Okon
2014	Okon on the run	Okon
2015	Okon and Jennifer	Okon
2015	Udo Facebook	
2016	The Boss Is Mine	
2016	Ayamma	Aniefiok
2017	Lost In London	Okon
2017	16th Anniversary	Ebube
2019	She is	Tobia
2020	Unroyal	Kala
2021	Star Girl	John
2021	Dubara	
2022	Jabalata	Etim
2023	The heiress	Sunny
2023	She Must Be Obeyed	Etim
2024	Man & Ghost	Idongesit

On 1 May 2020, as the COVID-19 lockdowns in Nigeria was easing, Ime Bishop Umoh was featured in a comedy skit titled "The Pregnant Man" by Ofego on his YouTube channel using archive footage.

== See also ==
- Mc Galaxy
- Ini Edo
