= Gerald Chukwuma =

Nigerian artist

- Born: 1973 (age 52–53); Enugu, Nigeria
- Education: University of Nigeria
- Occupations: Visual artist, sculptor and painter

Gerald Chukwuma (born 1973) is a Nigerian visual artist, sculptor and painter. He is known for his intricate mixed-media sculptures using materials like aluminum, copper and wood. His work explores themes of voluntary and forced migration, globalisation and transformation, incorporating elements of the Uli art tradition.

== Early life and education ==
Chukwuma was born in 1973 in Enugu State, Nigeria. He attended the University of Nigeria, Nsukka where he studied Bachelor of Arts degree in Fine and applied arts, he graduated in 2003.

== Career ==
Chukwuma has joined other Nigerian veteran artists in several exhibitions like Ebenezer Akinola, George Edozie and Olusegun Adejumo.

Chukwuma's 2025 solo exhibition "Water Carried Us Here, Water Will Carry Us Away" was inspired by the Igbo Landing, in which captive Igbo people committed mass suicide in Georgia in 1803 after having taken control of the slave ship they were on and refusing to submit to slavery. The title is a reference to a song believed to have been sung by the enslaved Igbos as they marched into the ocean.

== Exhibitions ==
=== Selected solo exhibitions ===
- 2016: People's Paradise, Temple Muse, Lagos
- 2017: Standing Ovation, Gallery 1957, Accra
- 2019: Wrinkles, Kristin Hjellegjerde Gallery, London
- 2020: Ikwokirikwo: The Dance of Spirits, Kristin Hjellegjerde Gallery, Berlin
- 2021: Eclipse of the Scrolls, Kristin Hjellegjerde Gallery (London Bridge), London
- 2025: Water Carried Us Here, Water Will Carry Us Away, O’DA Art Gallery, Lagos

=== Selected group exhibitions ===
- 2006: With a Human Face, Pan African University, Lagos
- 2020: Enter Art Fair, with Kristin Hjellegjerde Gallery, Copenhagen
- 2021: Travels with Herodotus-A Journey through African Cultures, Galleria Bianconi, Milano
- 2022: Armory Off-Site, New York City
