= Collision Course (2021 film) =

2021 film

- Directed by: Bolanle Austen-Peters
- Screenplay by: James Amuta
- Produced by: James Amuta
- Starring: Kenneth Okolie; Daniel Etim Effiong; Ade Laoye; Kalu Ikeagwu; Chioma Chukwuka Akpotha
- Cinematography: Lance Gewer
- Music by: Ava Momoh
- Production company: BAP Productions
- Release date: 12 November 2021
- Running time: 75 minutes
- Country: Nigeria
- Language: English

Collision Course, later retitled as Collision, is a 2021 Nigerian drama film directed by Bolanle Austen-Peters. It was featured as the closing film for the 10th Africa International Film Festival in November 2021 and was the opening film for the Athen’s Nollywood Travel Film Festival in May 2022.

== Plot ==
The film simultaneously tells the story of a police officer struggling to make ends meet and an upcoming artiste. The police officer sets up a roadblock to collect bribes. At the roadblock, he meets the artiste and mistakenly shoots him dead. The events that follow would eventually lead to the police officer's arrest.

== Cast ==
- Chioma Chukwuka Akpotha as Ekaete
- Ade Laoye as Nneka
- Kenneth Okolie as TARS Commander
- Daniel Etim Effiong as Mide
- Bimbo Manuel as Mide's Dad
- Gregory Ojefua as TARS Commander
- Bamike Olawunmi-Adenibuyan
- Pius Abu as Ekaete's Father
- Zainab Balogun as Lagos City News Reporter
- Kelechi Udegbe as Corporal
- Kalu Ikeagwu as TARS Commander
- Nobert Young as DCO

== Awards ==
The film was the winner of Best Movie West Africa in Africa Magic Viewers’ Choice Awards in 2022.
