= Uzee Usman =

Nigerian film producer, actor and TV presenter (born 1986)

Uzee Usman Adeyemi
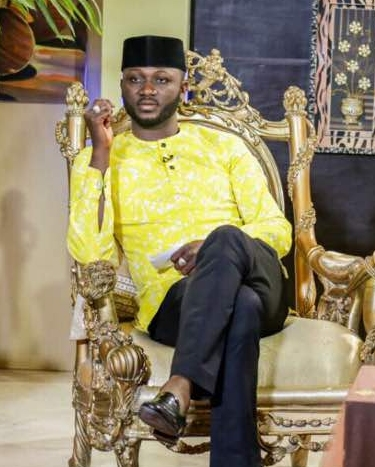
- Uzee Usman on set.
- Born: Uzee Usman Adeyemi; 11 November 1986 (age 40); Kaduna, Kaduna State, Nigeria
- Citizenship: Nigeria
- Education: University of Abuja; Iheris University, Togo
- Occupations: Film producer, actor, television presenter
- Years active: 2003–present

Uzee Usman Adeyemi (born November 11, 1986), is a Nigerian actor and film producer known for his film Voiceless, Mustapha, Anikulapo, Oga Abuja and A Tribe Called Judah. His ability for fusing Nollywood and Kannywood together won him several awards and recognitions Globally.

== Early life ==
Usman is of the Yoruba tribe and hails from Kwara State, born and grew up in Kaduna, Kaduna State. He holds two degrees in Political Science and English Language from the University of Abuja and an Honorary Doctorate Degree in Media & communications studies, from Iheris University, Togo respectively before he proceeded to study Special Effects in South Africa.

== Career ==
Usman began his career in 2003 as a make-up artist. In 2013, he delved into film-making and has produced award-winning films, both in Kannywood and Nollywood including Oga Abuja, which won Best Hausa Movie of the Year at the 2013 City People Entertainment Awards; and Maja which won Best Film of the Year (Kannywood) at the 2014 City People Entertainment Awards and was nominated in the Best Picture category at the 2014 Nigeria Entertainment Awards.

In 2021, He was awarded an Honorary Doctorate Degree by Iheris University, Togo.

In May 2023, TAJBank announced him as their brand ambassador.

In 2024, YNaija listed Uzee among the 100 most influential Nollywood actors who have made a mark in the industry in the past year.

In 2024, Uzee A. was among the 100 Most Notable African Peace Icons of 2023 and 2024.

== Filmography ==
Year	Title	Role	Genre	Remarks
2013	Oga Abuja	Produced	Drama	DSTV
2015	Maja	Produced	Drama	DSTV
2015	Har da mijina	Actor	Drama	DSTV
2016	Dark Closet	Produced	Drama	DSTV
2016	Power of Tomorrow	Produced	Drama	DSTV
2016	Hassana da Hussaina	Produced	Drama	DSTV
2016	Red Line	Produced	Drama	Showmax
2017	If I am President	Actor & Line Producer (Bankole)	Drama	Netflix
2017	Rariya	Yushe'u	Drama	YouTube
2018	Lagos Real Fake Life	Produced (Muhammed)	Drama	Netflix
2018	Mustapha	Actor	Drama	ROK Studdios
2018	Sharo	Actor	Drama	ROK Studios
2018	Makeroom	Actor		
2019	Muqabala (Season 1&2)	Produced & Actor	Drama	DSTV/ROK Studios
2019	'Almost Perfect	Actor	Drama	ROK Studios
2019	Least Expected	Produced & Actor	Drama	ROK Studios
2019	Maimuna	Produced & Actor	Drama	ROK Studios
2020	Dear Affy	Actor (Abubakar)	Drama	Netflix
2020	Good Citizen	Produced	Drama	ROK Studios
2020	"My Melody"	Actor	Drama	YouTube
2021	Voiceless	Actor (Banza)	Drama	Netflix
2021	"Love Actually"	Actor	Drama	YouTube
2021	"Fatal Mistake"	Actor	Drama	YouTube
2021	"All Things Die"	Actor	Drama	YouTube
2021	"The Good Doctor"	Actor (Matthew)	Drama	DSTV
2021	"Mystery Pond"	Actor	Drama	YouTube
2021	"When Heart Whispers"	Actor	Drama	YouTube
2021	"When Forever Ends"	Actor	Drama	YouTube
2021	Voiceless	Producer (Banza)	Drama	Netflix
2021	"Oma's Frangrance"	Actor	Drama	YouTube
2022	"Loved By You"	Actor (Gbenga)	Drama	YouTube
2022	"Accepting Love By You"	Actor	Drama	YouTube
2022	"A Place Called Regret"	Actor (Yoshola)	Drama	YouTube
2022	"Merry Go Wrong"	Actor	Drama	YouTube
2022	"Raindrop"	Actor	Drama	YouTube
2022	"Peonage"	Produced & Actor	Drama	ROK Studios
2022	"Insight"	Produced & Actor	Drama	ROK Studios
2022	"Enigma"	Produced & Actor (Nelson)	Drama	ROK Studios
2022	"Drastic Measures"	Produced & Actor	Drama	ROK Studios
2022	"Rebellion"	Produced & Actor	Drama	ROK Studios
2022	"Eagle Wings"	Produced & Actor	Drama	Amazon Prime
2022	"Living In Abuja" (Series)	Produced & Actor	Drama	ROK Studios
2023	Iman	Produced & Actor	TV Movie	ROK Studios
2023	Shina's Dilemma	Produced & Actor	Drama	ROK Studios
2023	A Tribe Called Judah	Actor (Adamu Judah)	Drama	Amazon Prime
2023	WAR: wrath and revenge	Actor	Drama	Netflix
2023	House 45	Rasheed	Drama	YouTube
2023	Daddy's Angels	Produced & Actor	Family Drama	ROK Studios
2023	Room 102	Richard	Drama	YouTube
2024	Double Date Quagmire		Drama	ROK Studios
2024	A Woman's Plight	Actor (Bryan)	Drama	ROK Studios
2024	Ejiro's Wish	Jeff	Drama	YouTube
2024	Anikulapo: Rise of the Spectre	Kuranga	TV series	Netflix
2025	Double Date Quagmire	Actor	Drama	ROK Studios
2025	Starved	Actor	Drama	YouTube
2025	Tender Devotion	Producer/Actor	Drama	ROK Studios
2025	The Waiter	Actor	Drama	Cinemas
2025	Everybody Loves Jenifa	Actor	Drama	Cinemas
2025	Conversation In Transit	Actor	Drama	Cinemas & Circuit TV
2025	Me Against You	Actor	Drama	YouTube
2025	Turmoil	Producer	Drama	ROK Studios
2025	Family Brouhaha	Actor	Drama	Cinemas

== Awards and nominations ==
Year	Award	Category	Film	Result	Ref
2008	Africa Movie Academy Awards	Best Make up	London Boy	Won	
2013	City People Entertainment Awards	Best Movie of the Year - Kannywood	Oga Abuja	Won	
2014	Africa Magic Viewers Choice Awards	Best Movie of the Year	Oga Abuja	Won	
2014	City People Entertainment Awards	Best Movie of the Year - Kannywood	Maja	Won	
2016	African Hollywood Awards	Best Film Producer	Oga Abuja	Won	
2022	Nollywood Travel Film Festival Athens (Greece)	Best Film International - Nollywood	Eagle Wings	Won	
2022	Africa Magic Viewers Choice Awards	Best Actor	Voiceless	Nominated	
2022	Northern Nigeria Peace Award	Honorary Award	Self	Won	

== See also ==
- List of Nigerian film producers
- List of Nigerian actors
