= Charles Okocha =

Nigerian actor

- Born: 5 July 1976 (age 50)
- Other name: Igwe 2Pac
- Occupation: Actor
- Years active: 2000–present
- Spouse: Mimi Okocha (m. 2024)
- Children: 3

Charles Okocha (born 5 July 1976), popularly known as Igwe 2Pac, is a Nigerian actor and comedian. He is known for playing bad-boy roles. Okocha was one of the mentors for the "Idea Challenge", initiated by the Nigeria Billionaires Network. He won the Vskit Voice Competition in 2019.

== Early life ==
Okocha was born in Delta State, Nigeria. His family relocated to Surulere, Lagos State, when he was young, where he completed his secondary education. He later pursued further studies in the United States.

== Career ==
Okocha began his acting career in 2000 with a breakthrough role in Wasted Years, a film directed by Teco Benson, where he earned the nickname "Igwe 2Pac." He has since starred in numerous films and is recognized for his comedic portrayal of the American accent.

== Personal life ==
In 2019, he was allegedly shot in Asaba by a policeman and underwent emergency surgery in the United States as a result. He married Mimi Okocha in 2024. He has three children from previous relationships.

== Controversy ==
A video clip circulating online angered his fans. Wherein the actor was allegedly accused of destroying his friend's car while dragging his daughter to a car. Okocha cleared the air and confirmed the clip was a scene in a movie.

On 1 August 2026, Charles Okocha defeated Portable (musician) in a celebrity boxing match held at the Balmoral Hall, Federal Palace Hotel, Lagos.

In August 2026, Okocha secured a victory against street-pop singer Portable in a celebrity boxing rematch tagged "Unfinished Business," held at the Balmoral Convention Centre in Victoria Island, Lagos, as part of the "Chaos in the Ring" event. The bout, which served as a follow-up to their December 2023 fight, was called after Portable engaged in an unscripted scuffle, walked out of the ring, and was subsequently disqualified by officials. Following allegations by Portable that Okocha had bitten him on the back during the match, Okocha dismissed the claim during an interview on TVC Entertainment, clarifying that he was wearing a mouthguard during the contest and advising Portable to accept the defeat.

== Filmography ==
- Three Thieves (2019) as Customer
- Mokalik (2019) as Emeka
- Makate Must Sell (2019)
- Muri & Ko (2024) as Chukwudi
