= George Edozie =

Nigerian painter (born 1972)

- Born: 11 May 1972 (age 54)
- Other name: George
- Citizenship: Nigeria
- Education: Primary School, Nsukka, Enugu State; University of Benin
- Occupation: Painter
- Notable work: Six Egbeda Artists With a Human Face

George Edozie (born 1972), is a Nigerian painter living in Lagos, Nigeria.

== Early life and education ==
George Edozie was born on 11 May 1972. He attended the University Primary School, Nsukka, Enugu State, Washington Memorial School, Onitsha, Anambra State. Edozie studied Fine & Applied Arts at the University of Benin in Benin City, Edo State, where he majored in painting and graduated with a BA degree in 1996.

== Career ==
George Edozie has been featured widely in group exhibitions in Nigeria and abroad. Some of the features include: "Six Egbeda Artists" at the National Museum, Onikan, Lagos, 2002; "The Search" at the French Cultural Centre, Ikoyi, Lagos, 2004; "With a Human Face" at the Pan-African University, Lagos, 2006; and "A Kaleidoscope of Nigerian traditional costumes" at Abuja, 2009. He is the author of the book 101 Contemporary Artists, A Celebration of Modern Nigerian Art and Nigerian Contemporary Art. The book was published in the year 2010. George Edozie is the president of the Guild of Fine Artists (GFA) and a member of the Society of Nigerian Artists (SNA), a position that he currently holds. His work is part of the collection at the Pan-African Heritage Museum in Accra, Ghana.

He has been on several exhibitions alongside other veteran Nigerian artists Ebenezer Akinola, Olusegun Adejumo and Gerald Chukwuma.
He was part of the exhibition 'Back to Black Art Africa' at Art Basel Miami (2017)

== Artistic Style ==
His artistic style is considered an impressionist artistic style, this is captured in some of his works by the use of angular characters and the use of rich textures. He is a sculptor and one of his works, Agu, was displayed in the Yemisi Shyllon Museum of Art with the exhibition titled Philosophical Objects: Man and the Other. He did an exhibition in 2025 with SMO Contemporary Art where he exhibited brightly colored paintings as well as the Agu sculpture using mixed media

== Exhibitions ==
1. New Nigerian Conjunctures: The Art of George Edozie, National Museum Lagos, Nigeria, (2018)
2. Back to Black Art, Africa Art Basel Miami (2017)
3. Afro Love, Alexis Gallery, Lagos (2015),
4. African Way of Art, La Galerie Vendome
5. Gatherings, SMO Contemporary Art, Lagos (2024)
6. Philosophical Objects: Man and the other, Yemisi Shyllon Museum, (2025)
