= She Is (film) =

- Directed by: Chris Eneng Enaji
- Produced by: Omawumi Megbele and Waje
- Release date: 2019
- Country: Nigeria
- Language: English

She is is a 2019 Nollywood movie co-produced by Omawumi and Waje featuring a successful woman who after coming of age needs to choose a husband. She faced a lot of challenges before getting a groom. It was directed by Chris Eneng Enaji.

The premier of the film took place at film house Cinema IMAX, Lekki on March 8, 2019, and it was released March 15, 2019. Some actors and dignitaries that attended the premier include Banky W., ⁣Toke Makinwa and Shaffy Bello.

== Plot ==
Frances at the peak of her career decides to settle down due to pressures from family and friends. Additionally, she is in danger of losing her womb due to a fibroid, leaving her with the choice of becoming pregnant or having surgery.

== Cast ==
- Somkele Iyamah-Idhalama as Akunna
- Chiwetalu Agu as chief Amosun
- Ime Bishop Umoh as Tobia
- Mawuli Gavor as Rowland
- Ray Emodi as pastor Jude
- Linda Ejiofor as Erimma
- Desmond Elliot as Dr Gerald
- Segun Arinze as Dr Mark
- Uzo Arukwe as Pastor Chike
- Blessing Onwukwe as Sis Sarah
- Amaka Iruobe as Erykah
- Chioma Omeruah as Ojugo (chigul)
- Lami Philips as Dr Fela
- Frank Donga

== Reception ==
The film according to fans enlighten women on the options available to get pregnant without been married such as IVF and surrogacy.

== See also ==
- List of Nigerian films of 2019
