= Makate Must Sell =

- Directed by: Don Omope
- Starring: Blossom Chukwujekwu, Akan Nnani, Josh 2 Funny, Wofai Fada, Daniel Etim Effiong, Greg Ojefua, and Charles Okocha.
- Production companies: Filmone Distribution, Screenart, See Fam and Ahh Entertainment
- Release date: 3 May 2019 (Nigeria)
- Country: Nigeria
- Language: English

Makate Must Sell is a 2019 Nigerian romantic comedy film directed by Don Omope for Filmone Distribution, Screenart, See Fam and Ahh Entertainment. The film marks the acting debut of media personality Toke Makinwa and stars Blossom Chukwujekwu, Akan Nnani, Josh 2 Funny, Wofai Fada, Daniel Etim Effiong, Greg Ojefua, and Charles Okocha.

== Synopsis ==
The story revolves around a woman in her early thirties whose friends decide to get her married in twelve days. It gets complicated as problems arise in her quest to find a suitable man for marriage.

== Cast ==
- Igwe Tupac as himself
- Toyin Abraham as herself
- Toke Makinwa as Ricky
- Daniel Etim Effiong as Gbenro
- Blossom Chukwujekwu as Chudi
- Bisola Aiyeola as radio producer
- Rita Edward as Aunty Emem
- Lasisi Elenu as radio caller 1
- Wofai Fada as Valerie Ake
- Imoikor Joseph as Mr. Ake
- Angelina Ibeh as Mrs. Chukwuka
- Akah Nnani as Pius Chukwuka
- Diipo Adeusi as Pius's best man
- Josh Alfred as wedding band singer
- Lepacious Bose as Aunty Ada
- Nedu Wazobia as pastor

== Premiere ==
Makate Must Sell was released in cinemas nationwide on the 3 May 2019.
