= Uchechi Treasure Okonkwo =

Nigerian actress and gospel singer (born 2010)

Uchechi Treasure
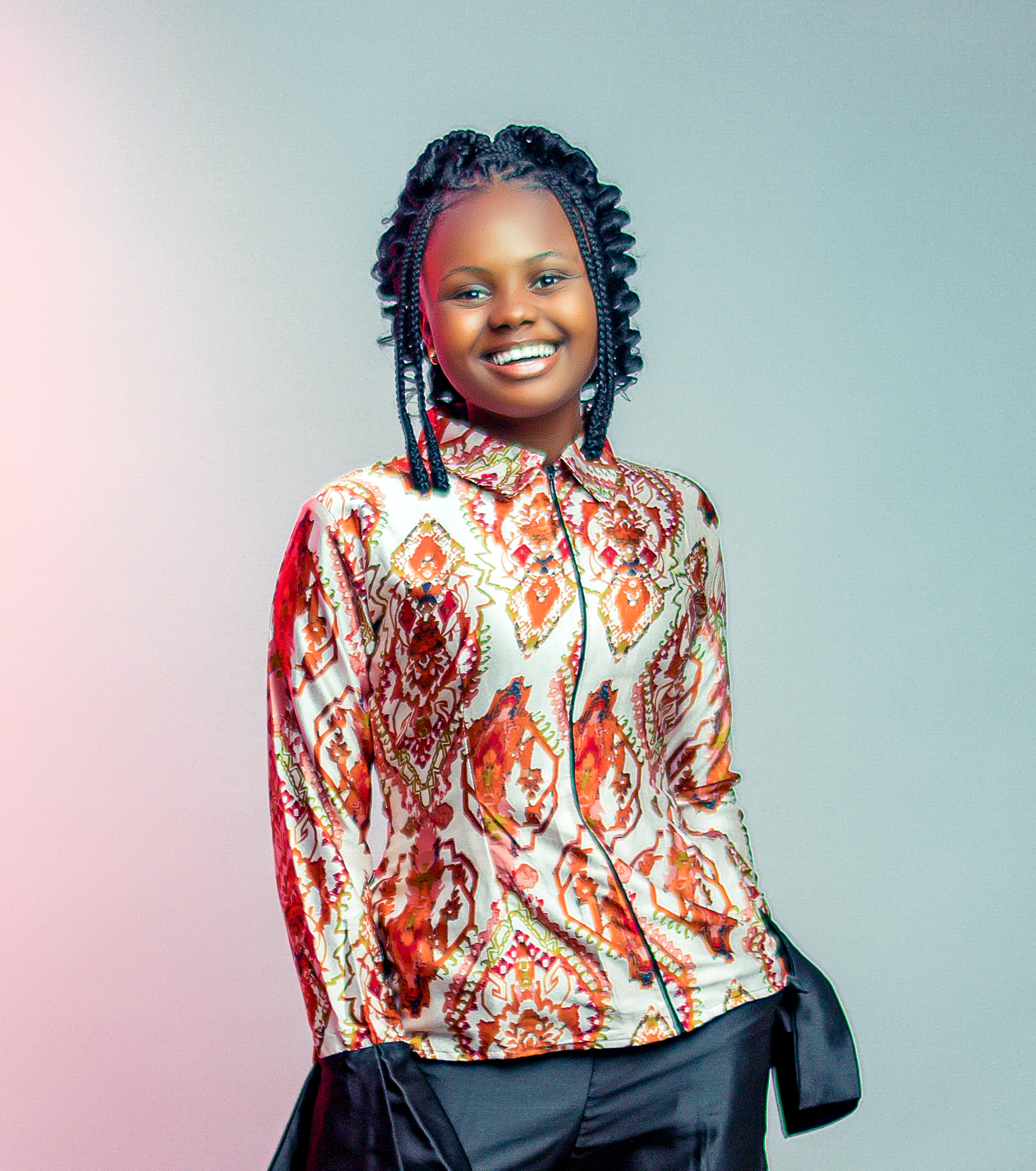
- Born: Uchechi Treasure Okonkwo; 12 October 2010 (age 16); Owerri, Imo State, Nigeria
- Other name: Adakirikiri
- Education: SIV Gold Model Secondary School
- Occupations: Actress; gospel singer; songwriter; dancer; producer
- Years active: 2015–present
- Father: Okonkwo Chijioke Junior

YouTube information
- Channel: AdaKirikiriTv
- Years active: 2017–present
- Genre: Movies
- Subscribers: 1.6 million
- Views: 233 million
- Last updated: 15 May 2025

Uchechi Treasure Okonkwo (born October 12, 2010) also known as Adakirikiri, is a Nigerian actress, gospel singer, rapper, songwriter, producer, and dancer. She began her career in gospel music and gained attention with her breakout single "Okeosisi". She later moved into acting, first appearing as a child actress on the Africa Magic mini-comedy series Chief Imo & Adakirikiri (2015–2017).

She has since played lead roles in several Nollywood and Ghallywood films, including The Good Doctor (2021), Saving Rose (2021), Woman Power (2023), Iman (2023), and This Very Christmas (2024). In 2024, she won Best Teen Actress at the Nollywood Travel Film Festival and the Nollywood & African Films Investment Summit & Awards.

== Early life and education ==
Uchechi Treasure Okonkwo was born on October 12, 2010, in Owerri, the capital of Imo State in southeastern Nigeria. Her parents are Okonkwo Chijioke Junior and Eze Ogechi Patience, both of whom work in the film industry. Her father is a producer, and her mother is a producer and line producer.

She began her education at Merit International Nursery and Primary School in Owerri. After her family moved to Enugu, Okonkwo attended part of her secondary school at Prime College. The family later returned to Imo State, where she continued her studies at SIV Gold Model Secondary School.

== Career ==
=== 2015–2020: Breakthrough with music ===
Okonkwo began her career on YouTube at the age of eight, performing as a comedian and gospel singer under the name Ada kirikiri. She gained attention by doing cover versions of songs by popular gospel artists such as Chioma Jesus and Mercy Chinwo. Around the same period, Okonkwo appeared in the Africa Magic Igbo mini comedy series Chief Imo and Adakirikiri, which aired on DStv. In the summer of 2020, she released the gospel single "Okeosisi", which garnered over two million views on YouTube.

=== 2021–present ===
Okonkwo 's first leading role was as Elle in The Good Doctor, which premiered at the Black Star International Film Festival in March 2021 starring alongside Ghanaian actress Jackie Appiah. That same month, she took on a lead role in the romantic drama Saving Rose. By the age of 13, Okonkwo had built a growing filmography, with appearances in titles such as Lingering Pain (2021), Daddy's Angels (2023), Woman Power (2023), and A Piece of Me (2024), where she appeared alongside Regina Daniels.

In 2023, she played the lead role in Rok Studios drama Iman, and in 2024, Okonkwo featured in the Christmas family drama This Very Christmas, alongside Patience Ozokwor and Toosweet Annan. In 2024, she received the Best Teen Actress award at the Nollywood Travel Film Festival Awards held in Italy.

In 2025 Okonkwo received two nominations at the Black International Nollywood Film Festival (BINFF), for her performance in the film In My Circle. She competed in the Best Actress category and Best Actress International category for the same role.

== Filmography ==
Key
†	Denotes works that have not yet been released

=== Film ===
Year	Film	Role	Genre
2021	The Good Doctor	Elle	Drama
2021	Saving Rose	Rose	Drama
2021	Shining Light		Drama
2022	Lingering Pain	Ozioma	Comedy, Romance
2022	Ziora	ziora	Romance
2022	April	Kamsi	Romance, Fantasy
2022	Dry Leaves		Romance, Drama
2022	Couple Rivalry	Victoria	Drama
2022	Perfect Plan	Nonso	Drama
2023	One in a Million	Young Marygret	Drama
2023	Iman	Iman	Tv Drama
2023	Love with a taint	Precious	Drama
2023	Tales of Nmasi	Nmasi	Drama
2023	My Co Wife 1 – 3		Family Drama
2023	Whispers in my Ear	Yagazie	Drama
2023	Game's Up	Beverly	Romance, Drama
2023	Nnajulu	Nnajulu	Family Drama
2023	Premonition	Sandra	Drama
2023	Daddy's Angels	Clara	Drama
2023	Dark Intent	Maya	Drama
2023	Fate of My Home	Amara	Drama
2023	Love's Lies	Avril	Drama
2023	Helena's Quest	Adaolisa	Drama
2023	Woman Power	Ada	Action, Drama
2023	Pandora's Box	Adora	Drama
2024	Cupid's Arrow	Annabel	Drama
2024	This Very Christmas	Kathie	Family Drama
2024	In My Circle	Chiazokam	Drama
2024	Ahanna	Princess	Action, Drama, Thriller
2024	Cara's Pain	Cara	Drama
2024	I See You	Ivy	Drama, Romance
2024	Hustle	Akunne	Drama
2024	What Happened to Keira Johnson?	Awele	Drama
2024	Love's Route	Tega	Drama, Romance
2024	Jane's Ordeal 1 – 2	Ella	Drama
2024	My Mother & I	Peggy	Drama
2024	Chief Williams Girls	Obehi	Family Drama
2024	The curse	Sharon	Drama
2024	The Switch	Chisimdi	Family Drama
2024	The Man in Her Life	Ella	Drama, Romance
2024	A Piece Of Me	Sherry	Drama
2024	Sole Mates	Dalu	Drama, Romance
2025	Fractured Identity	Odinaka	Drama, Romance

=== Television ===
Year	Title	Role	Notes
2015–2017	Chief Imo & Adakirikiri	Adakirikiri	Main role

== Discography ==
=== Singles ===
Year	Title
2019	Unity song
2020	Obiliwo
2020	Jesus
2020	Okeosisi
2020	One with God
2021	Powerful Name
2022	Omewo Ya
2022	You Look Beyond
2022	Ima Mma
2022	Ekweme Remix
2022	Hossana Diri Eze
2022	If No Be God
2022	Ekele Juru Onum
2023	Daddy Wey Dey Pamper
2023	Eze Mmuo remix ft. (Henry Sopulu)

=== Film score ===
- This Very Christmas (2024)

== Awards and nominations ==
Year	Award	Category	Result	Ref.
2024	Nollywood Travel Film Festival Awards	Best Teen Actress	Won	
2024	Nollywood & African Films Investment Summit & Awards	Best Teen Actress	Won	
2025	The Achievers Awards International	Teen Act Of The Year	Nominated	
2025	Black International Nollywood Film Festival (BINFF)	Best Actress	Nominated	
2025	YouTube Creator Award	Gold Creator Award	Won	
2026	Africa Golden Awards	Young Generation African Content Creator	Nominated	
2026	Africa Golden Awards	Young Generation African Music Talent Of The Year	Nominated	
2026	Africa Golden Awards	Top Young Generation African Actor/Actress	Nominated	
