= Mum, Dad, Meet Sam =

Nollywood movie

- Directed by: T.S. Ukpo
- Starring: Joseph Benjamin
- Release dates: 2015
- Country: Nigeria
- Language: English

Mum, Dad Meet Sam is a Nollywood movie about a Nigerian man who, after studying abroad, brought his English girlfriend home, which displeased his family.
