= Akah Nnani =

Nigerian actor

- Born: Akah Nnani; 31 January; Port Harcourt, Rivers State
- Citizenship: Nigerian
- Education: Pampers Private School; Topgrade Secondary School
- Alma mater: Covenant University
- Occupation: Actor
- Years active: 2014
- Known for: Entertainment Splash (2014–2015); One Chance (2015); Banana Island Ghost (2017); Man of God (2022)

Akah Nnani is a Nigerian actor, TV host, content creator, and YouTuber, well known for his supporting role in Banana Island Ghost, which earned him a nomination at the 14th, and 15th editions of The AMA Awards in the Best Actor in a Supporting Role category in 2018 and 2019. In 2022, he returned to screen with a lead role in the Netflix Original movie, Man of God, as Samuel Obalolu.

== Early life ==
I had planned on becoming an actor but I wasn't confident enough and was discouraged, till Ric Hassani, talked me into auditioning for the Africa Magic Original Film "Redemption", where I got my first acting role

— The Punch –

Akah Nnani hails from Imo State, and was born on January 31, in Port Harcourt, Nigeria, with three siblings. His father is an immigration officer and his mother is a businesswoman. He attended Pampers Private School, in Surulere, for his elementary education, and had his secondary education, at Topgrade Secondary School, in Surulere. He graduated with a BSc in Mass Communication from Covenant University.

== Career ==
In September 2014, Akah Nnani started a vlog channel on YouTube, known as "Akah Bants", and was in the lead role of One Chance as the character of Sly in the Ndani TV web-series, released on July 15, 2015. In December 2015, he resigns as the co-host, of "Entertainment Splash", a TV program on TVC Entertainment (formerly Television Continental), to focus on his YouTube Vlog channel. On 12 July 2016, he was in the cast of On the Real as the character of Efosa in the EbonyLife television-series. Nnani, alongside Olu Jacobs, and Joke Silva's was in the cast of Heartbeat The Musical, a 19-day stage-play, written by Tosin Otudeko, and Debo Oluwatuminu. On February 8, 2017, Accelerate TV premiered its first episode of Shade Corner, a web-TV show, hosted by Akah Nnani, alongside Makida Moka, Adebayo Oke-Lawal, King Cam and Noble Ezeala.

On 24 May 2017, Nnani appeared in the cast of Isoken, as the character of Ifeayin. On 4 August 2017, he starred in Banana Island Ghost, in a minor role as a Sergeant, which earned him two nominations in the Best Actor in a Supporting Role category in the 14th, and 15th Africa Movie Academy Awards. He also starred in Ratnik, Lara and the Beat, The Royal Hibiscus Hotel, and Omo Ghetto: The Saga. In 2019, Funke Akindele recruited him to join Jenifa's Diary in its 14th season, as the character of Anthony, playing the role of Jenifa's P.A. In 2021, Enterprise Life Nigeria, a subsidiary of Enterprise Group, recurred Akah Nnani as the host of This Is Life, a YouTube podcast show, first premiered on 26 August, with guess appearance from Ric Hassani, Wana Udobang, Wofai Fada, and Precious Emmanuel. On 22 October 2021, he starred in Ghana Jollof, as Romanus in the Showmax Original comedy television series. On 16 April 2022, he was in cast of Netflix Original Man of God, as the character of Samuel Obalolu.

== Personal life ==
On 29 January 2019, Akah Nnani got engaged to Claire Idera. They had their traditional engagement on 8 April 2019 and got married on 12 April 2019.

On 8 February 2021, they welcome their first daughter, Chizaram Gabrielle Eriife Amaris Nnani.

== Filmography ==
Year	Film	Role	Notes
2017	Isoken	Ifeayin	Drama/Comedy/Romance
2017	Banana Island Ghost	Sergeant	Action/Comedy/Fantasy
2017	The Royal Hibiscus Hotel	Tobem	Comedy/Romance
2018	Lara and the Beat	G Diddy	Drama/Music/Romance
2019	Makate Must Sell	Pius Chukwuka	Comedy/Romance
2020	Ratnik	Seargent	Action
2020	Omo Ghetto: The Saga	Mario	Gangster Comedy
2021	Ghana Jollof	Romanus	Comedy Drama
2021	My Village People	Village Driver	Comedy Drama
2022	Man of God	Samuel Obalolu	Drama
2022	Becoming Abi	Daniel	TV Series

=== Television ===
Year	Show	Role	Notes
2014–2015	Entertainment Splash	Host	TVC Entertainment
2016	One Chance	Sly	Ndani TV
2016–2017	On the Real	Efosa	EbonyiLife TV
2017	Shade Corner	Host	Accelerate TV
2019	Jenifa's Diary	Recruited	Africa Magic Showcase
2022	Laces	Supporting Role	with . Ini Edo
2023	She Must Be Obeyed	Sisqo	with. Funke Akindele 5 episodes

== Stage ==
Title	Year	Role	Notes
Heartbeat The Musical	2016		Muson Centre

== Awards and nominations ==
Year	Award	Category	Nominee/Work	Result
2017	The Future Awards Africa	Prize for Acting	Himself	Nominated
2018	Africa Movie Academy Awards	Best Actor in a Supporting Role	Himself / "B.I.G"	Nominated
2019	Africa Movie Academy Awards	Best Actor in a Supporting Role	Himself / "B.I.G"	Nominated
