= Thy Will Be Done (film) =

2015 film by Obi Emelonye

- Directed by: Obi Emelonye
- Written by: Tobe Osigwe
- Produced by: Mary Njoku; Obi Emelonye
- Starring: Ramsey Nouah; Mercy Johnson; Jide Kosoko; Mary Njoku; Enyinna Nwigwe
- Cinematography: Keidrych Wasley
- Edited by: Ben Nugent
- Music by: Luke Corradine
- Production companies: Rok Studios; The Nollywood Factory
- Distributed by: FilmOne Distribution
- Release date: 26 February 2015 (London premiere)
- Running time: 86 minutes
- Country: Nigeria
- Language: English

Thy Will Be Done is a 2015 Nigerian drama film, written by Tobe Osigwe, produced by Mary Njoku, co-produced and directed by Obi Emelonye. It stars Ramsey Nouah, Mercy Johnson, Jide Kosoko, Mary Njoku and Enyinna Nwigwe.

== Plot ==
Thy Will Be Done is the story of Pius, a happily married pastor in charge of a large church in Lagos, Nigeria. But when his first wife whom he buried seven years ago suddenly shows up, his world is thrown into turmoil. His present wife tries to fight her corner but Pius has a choice to make between his calling and his wives; between old sins and new loyalties; between taking firm action and surrendering to God's will. Weakened by guilt and overwhelmed by sensational revelations, nothing would have prepared Pius for how rapidly things would descend into violent chaos, for hell hath no fury like a woman scorned.

== Cast ==
- Ramsey Nouah as Pius
- Mercy Johnson as Lucy
- Olivia Gilbert as Amara
- Rachel Isaac as Nurse
- Theodore Clinton as Papa
- Jide Kosoko as General Dele
- Joseph Thomas as Kwanza
- Gabriel Okorie as Elder Ebiye
- Stanley Immanuel as Hassan Dele
- Mary Remmy Njoku as Mochunu
- Enyinna Nwigwe as T.Rugged
- T. Temple Ikeji as Elder Ugwu
- Anthony Aclet as Tony
- Frank M. Ahearn as Oro
- Ifeanyi Attamah as Dr. Ugo
- Dozie Eboh as Deacon
- Zduak Fidelis as Angela
- Favour Ihezue as Toyin

== Release ==
The world premiere of Thy Will Be Done took place at the BFI IMAX in London on 26 February 2015. It started showing in Nigerian cinemas on 15 May 2015, and was distributed by FilmOne.

== Reception ==
Sodas and Popcorn comments: "The best thing about this movie is probably the screenplay. Thy Will Be Done, delivers an original story that captivates and sizzles. It's a story anyone can relate to"
