= Kristin Hjellegjerde =

Norwegian gallerist

Kristin Hjellegjerde is a Norwegian curator and gallerist. Born in Minnesund, Norway, she is based in London, where she founded Kristin Hjellegjerde Gallery in 2012.

== Biography ==
Hjellegjerde studied literature, criminology and Ideas of History at the University of Oslo. After completing her degree, she spent time living in Italy, Bangkok, Singapore and New York. In New York, she continued her studies at the Herbert Berghof Studio and worked in real estate, selling properties on the Upper West Side.

She later wrote and directed plays in Los Angeles. After completing an Art and Business course at New York University, she moved to London, where she established her first gallery in 2012.

== Gallery and curatorial work ==
Kristin Hjellegjerde Gallery focuses on international contemporary art, exhibiting the work of emerging and established artists. Its programme encompasses painting, works on paper, sculpture, installation and video art.

The gallery's first location opened in Wandsworth, London. Its subsequent expansion included additional spaces in London, Berlin and Nevlunghavn, Norway.

In addition to organising exhibitions within her gallery, Hjellegjerde has curated projects for other art institutions.

=== KUBATANA ===
In 2019, Hjellegjerde curated KUBATANA: An Exhibition with Contemporary African Artists at Vestfossen Kunstlaboratorium in Norway. The exhibition brought together 33 artists from 18 African countries, with works displayed across all four floors of the institution.

The exhibition featured painting, photography, sculpture, installation, video and performance. Its themes included personal histories, collective mythologies, colonial legacies and contemporary social issues.
