= Luke of Lies =

- Release dates: August 2, 2015
- Country: Nigeria

Luke of Lies is a Nigerian movie which tells the story of three friends who try to find ways and means to steal from the rich in order to enrich themselves.

== Cast ==
- Alexx Ekubo
- Belinda Effah
- Eddie Watson
- Daniella Okeke
