= Idowu Philips =

Nigerian actress

- Born: 16 October 1942 (age 83); Ijebu Ode, Ogun State, Nigeria.
- Other name: Iya Rainbow
- Citizenship: Nigerian
- Occupations: Healthcare Assistant, film actress
- Years active: 1965-present
- Children: 5

Idowu Philips (born 16 October 1942), popularly known as Iya Rainbow, is a Nigerian veteran actress. She was honoured with the Industry Merit Awards alongside Richard Mofe-Damijo at the 2024 Africa Magic Viewers' Choice Awards (AMVCA).

== Early life and career ==
Idowu Philips was born on 16 October 1942 at Ijebu Ode, a city in Ogun State, southwestern Nigeria. She attended African Methodist School and Anglican Modern School for her primary and secondary education. Her stage name, "Iya Rainbow" stems from "Osumare" (meaning "rainbow" in British English), the name of the theatre group of Sir Hubert Ogunde, who died in 1990. Idowu Philips worked as a healthcare assistant in general hospitals in Nigeria for several years and occasionally acted in theatre. Idowu ventured into full-time acting after the death of her husband - Augustine Ayanfemi Phillips (who worked closely with the late patriarch of the Nigerian Film Industry Sir Herbert Ogunde. She has featured in several Nigerian films, including Apaadi, Eru and Aje ni iya mi among others). Idowu has five children.

Endorsement

Idowu Philips is a brand ambassador for Airtel, a telecommunication company. Idowu Philip is also an ambassador for Yotomi Golden Estate, a low cost housing estate project initiated by the late movie mogul Alade Aromire.
