= Lost in London (2017 Nigerian film) =

2017 Nigerian comedy film

- Directed by: Sunkanmi Adebayo
- Produced by: Uduak Isong Oguamanam
- Starring: Alexx Ekubo; Ime Bishop Umoh; Ella Bates; Peter Coe; Khafi Kareem
- Cinematography: Daniyal Harris-Vajda
- Edited by: Uche Alex Moore
- Production company: Closer Pictures
- Release date: June 9, 2017
- Running time: 108 min
- Country: Nigeria
- Language: English

Lost in London is a 2017 Nigerian comedy film directed by Sunkanmi Adebayo and produced by Uduak Isong Oguamanam as part of the Okon franchise series. The film stars Ime Bishop Umoh, Alexx Ekubo, Ella Bates, and Khafi Kareem. It was released on 9 June 2017 and premiered on Netflix in 2019.

== Plot ==
The theme of the film revolves around Okon and Boma who were young students who got selected for an exchange program in London. Their attempt to earn some pounds before returning to Nigeria leaves them with thrilling experiences.

== Cast ==
- Alexx Ekubo as Bonaventure
- Ime Bishop Umoh as Okon
- Kia Nolan as Angie
- Khafi Kareem as Abimbola (Taxi Driver)
- Peter Coe as Restaurant Manager
- Ella Bates as Christine
- Bentley Aghazie as Agent Ben
- Adi Lev as Puetta
- Nathan Pinnock as Brendan
- Funny Bone as Bona's Brother
- Edidiong Nsek as Tom
- Kemi Lofinmakin as Martha
- Kingsley Nakpodia as Ben's Partner
