= The Boss Is Mine =

2016 Nigerian film

- Directed by: Okechukwu Oku
- Screenplay by: Patrick Nnamani
- Starring: Ime Bishop Umoh; Mike Godson; Sapphire Obi
- Release date: January 8, 2016
- Country: Nigeria
- Language: English

The Boss Is Mine is a 2016 Nigerian comedy film directed Okechukwu Oku and written by Patrick Nnamani.

== Plot ==
A successful young man employs a cook and cleaner to ease the pressure on his wife and twist and turns happen.

== Cast ==
- Ime Bishop Umoh as Victor
- Mike Godson as Oga
- Sapphire Obi as Ngozi
- Mary Ogbonna as Anu
- Daniella Okeke as Gabriella
- Osita Chukwu as Musa
- Osita Agbo as Cab Guy
