= Daniella Okeke =

Nigerian actress

- Born: 26 March 1977 (age 48)
- Citizenship: Nigerian
- Occupation: actress
- Notable work: Sleek Ladies (2007); Stronger than Pain (2007); Lagos Cougars

Daniella Okeke // is a Nigerian actress. In 2013, she starred as "Joke" in Lagos Cougars, a role that earned her the Best Actress in a Leading Role nomination at both the 10th Africa Movie Academy Awards and 2014 Nigeria Entertainment Awards.

== Early life ==
Okeke was born on 26 March 1987. She hails from Imo State, Nigeria. Her parents Mr and Mrs Okeke were lovers of Education. She grew up in a Family of four with two younger brothers.

== Education ==
Daniella had both her Primary and Secondary School in Imo State. Afterwards, she went to the University of Lagos where she earned a degree in Fine Art.

== Career ==
In university she began acting in School plays and appeared in several production in her University's theatre group. After graduating she began her Nollywood career where she featured in small roles in the early 2000. In 2013 She had her breakthrough by playing a leading role in the film LAGOS COUGARS where she played the role of a joker. She has worked with top Directors and Actors in the industry and she is versatile.

== Awards ==
- Best Actress in a Leading Role at the 10th Africa Movie Academy Award
- Best Actress in a Leading Role at the 2014 Nigeria Entertainment Award
- Nominee, Best Actress in a Leading Role at the Africa Magic Viewers Choice Awards
- Best Actress in a Leading Role, 10th Africa Movie Academy Awards - (2014)
- Best Actress in a Leading Role, Nigeria Entertainment Awards - (2014)
- Nominee, Best Actress in a Leading Role, Africa Magic Viewers Choice Awards - (2015)

== Filmography ==
- Sleek Ladies (2007) as Jennifer
- Stronger than Pain (2007)
- Lagos Cougars (2013) as Joke
- I Think He Loves Me (2014)
- Luke of Lies (2015) as Susan
- Lost Pride (2015) as Calista
- Flaws (2016) as Jane
- The Boss Is Mine (2016) as Gabriella
- The Devil in Between (2018) as Yemi
- A Matter of Chance (2019) as Ebele
- Beyond Repair (2020)
