= Mummy Dearest (film) =

Nollywood movie

- Directed by: Willis Ikedum
- Release dates: September 15, 2014
- Running time: +101 minutes
- Country: Nigeria
- Language: English

Mummy Dearest is a Nollywood movie which tells a story of a woman who has five kids and wants to be constantly in touch with them. She faces difficulties in getting in touch with the youngest child who is her only son. The reason why she is not getting good quality time with her kid is because he is busy with work and friends.
