= Terra Kulture =

Arts and culture organisation

Terra Kulture Arts & Studio Limited
- Formation: 2003
- Type: Cultural Institution
- Headquarters: Tiamiyu Savage Street, Victoria Island, Lagos
- Region served: Nigeria
- Key people: Bolanle Austen-Peters
- Website: www.terrakulture.com
- Formerly called: Terra Kulture Limited – The Nigerian Cultural Centre

Terra Kulture is an arts and culture center located in Victoria Island in Lagos, Nigeria with an attached restaurant. The story has it that film-makers are indicating interest in producing plays and other entertainment at the Terra Kulture because of its cultural setting.

== Establishment ==
Nigerian lawyer Bolanle Austen-Peters founded Terra Kulture in 2003.

The center is a restaurant, serving Nigerian cuisine, bookstore and cultural venue, hosting exhibitions of Nigerian art, theater, and book readings as well as language classes in the three main Nigerian languages, Hausa, Igbo and Yoruba.

Annual events at Terra Kulture includes an art auction and the Taruwa festival of Performing arts.

== Terra Arena ==
Terra Kulture launched its 450-seater theatre called Terra Kulture Arena, situated at its headquarters Tiamiyu Savage Crescent, Victoria Island, Lagos, Nigeria.

== Terra Academy For The Arts (TAFTA) ==
Terra Kulture is also currently in partnership with Mastercard Foundation to empower 65,000 Young Nigerians, an initiative that would form a significant part of the Terra Academy For The Arts (TAFTA) Program.

In October 2022, Terra Kulture received a donation from global streaming platform Netflix, which the company plans to industry and community focused areas of engagement like academic training, bookstore and theatre.
