= Jason Njoku =

British entrepreneur (born 1980)

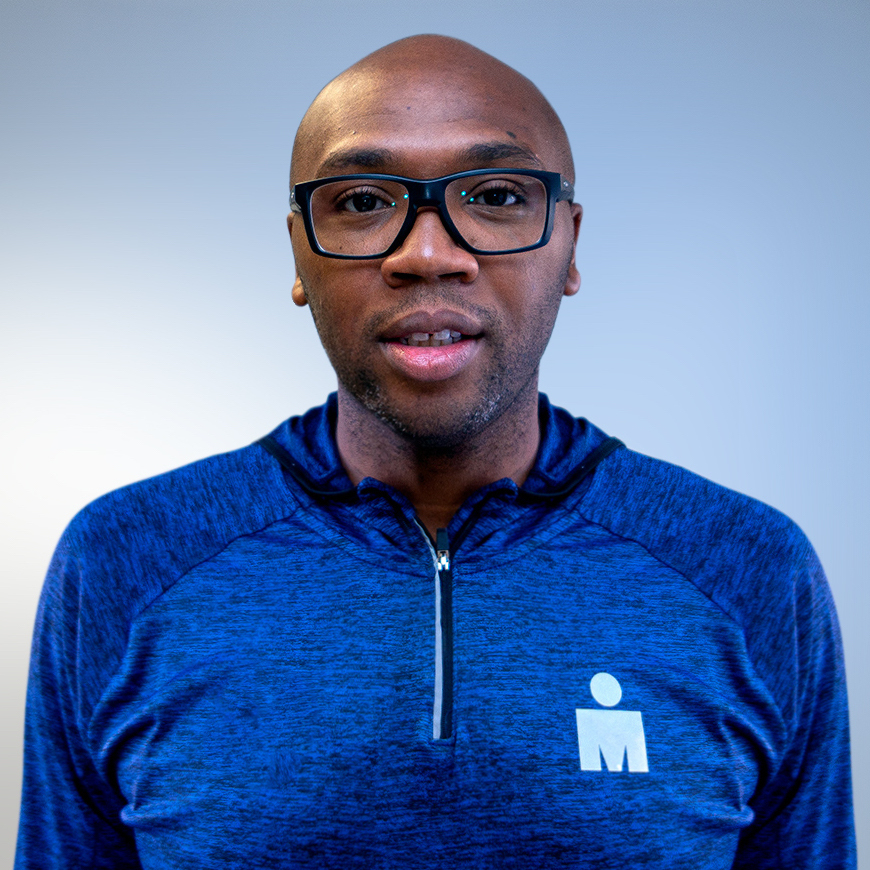
- Njoku in 2020
- Born: Jason Chukwuma Njoku; 11 December 1980 (age 45); London, England
- Occupation: Entrepreneur
- Known for: Founder of iROKOtv
- Spouse: Mary Njoku (m. 2012)
- Website: jason.com.ng

Jason Chukwuma Njoku (born 11 December 1980) is a British businessman and a producer. He is the co-founder and CEO of iROKOtv, a video-on-demand service for Nigerian movies.

A self-proclaimed serial entrepreneur, iROKOtv was Njoku's 11th attempt at starting a business. He came up with the idea of launching a new distribution platform for Nollywood whilst living at home with his mum, aged 30, after a number of failed enterprises.

== Early life and education ==
Jason was born and raised in Deptford, Southeast London. His mother raised him and his three sisters and brother by herself, whilst working a full-time job in the National Health Service. He attended school in London, then moved to a village in Nigeria from the age of 12 to 15. After he returned to the United Kingdom, he attended college to complete his A-Levels, before securing a place at The University of Manchester where he read Chemistry. He graduated in 2005 with a 2:1 and launched Brash Magazine, a student publication which ran for three years before it closed in 2008.

== Career ==
=== iROKO ===
After a number of failed enterprises between 2005 and 2010, which included a blog network, a T-shirt business and a web design company, Njoku moved back home into his mother's house in Deptford. It was there that he came up with the idea of starting a Nollywood online distribution business, "The West had Hulu and Netflix – Africa had nothing", notes Njoku. Having studied the industry from afar, he flew to Lagos, thanks to the financial help of his best friend Bastian Gotter, a fellow University of Manchester graduate, and started purchasing the online licenses of Nollywood movies. He worked from a two-bedroom apartment in Festac Town, Lagos, and struck a licensing deal directly with YouTube, establishing his brand as the video platform's largest official content partner on the African continent.

In 2010, Njoku and his former partner Bastian Gotter launched NollywoodLove, a YouTube channel, which was profitable within two months of launch. That same year, thanks to an article by Sarah Lacy who worked at the time for Tech Crunch, NollywoodLove caught the attention of US-based venture capital fund Tiger Global who were interested in expanding their reach in emerging markets.

Series A investment of $3 million was secured from Tiger Global in 2010 and the company launched a stand-alone video-on-demand movie platform, iROKOtv, on 1 December 2011. The site drew in viewers from 178 countries around the world. Njoku and Gotter have since gone on to raise an additional $22 million from international VCs, with inclusion from Investment AB Kinnevik and RISE Capital and have used the investment to build an extensive film catalog of 5,000 movies, launch offices in Lagos, New York, and London and invest in improving the company's technology resource. Iroko has gone to make other funding investment totaling $40 million

In 2015, Njoku decided to focus the company's attention on an Android mobile app, rather than a streaming platform to combat broadband infrastructure problems that Africa poses.

In July 2012, he was cited by Forbes Africa as one of the 'Ten Young African Millionaires to Watch'. On 29 August 2013, Njoku was named as the CNBC All Africa Business Awards Young Leader of the Year for West Africa. He has also been named as one of Fast Company's Top 1000 Most Creative People in Business.

=== Spark ===
In August 2013, alongside his business partners Bastian Gotter and Mary Remmy Njoku, Njoku launched a $2 million investment vehicle for Lagos-based Internet start-ups called Spark. The company initially invested in 11 companies, including a drinks distribution company called Drinks.ng, a real-estate and property online letting agency called ToLet.com.ng, and a hotel room booking site, called Hotels.ng, which has gone on to raise $1.2 million in VC investment from EchoVC Pan-Africa Fund and Omidyar Network. In 2015, Jason Njoku in a blog post officially announced they're letting go of four startups considered failed businesses: Bus.com.ng (an online bus ticketing service ), Insured.ng (an insurance comparison platform), Giddimint.com.ng (an online fashion store) and Christians.ng, an online dating platform for Christians.

== Personal life ==
Njoku married Nollywood film star and producer Mary Remmy Njoku in Festac Town, Lagos, on 18 August 2012. They welcomed their first son, Jason Obinna Njoku, on 30 July 2013, a second child, Nwakaego Annabel Njoku, was born on 24 August 2015 and a third child, Nnenna Amber Njoku born on 4 August 2017.
