= Irokotv =

Video on demand and streaming service

irokotv
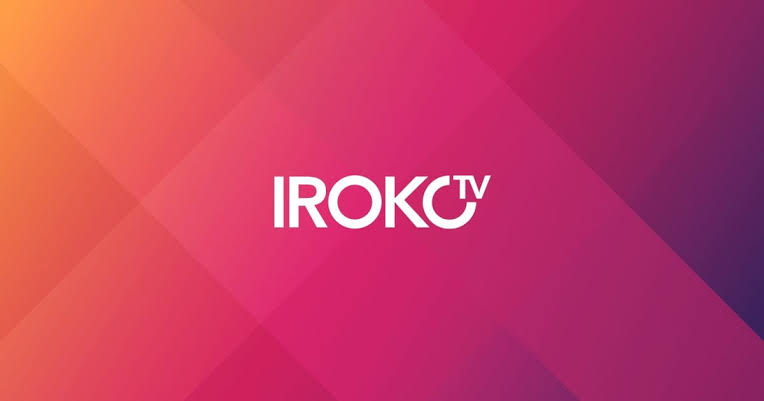
- Company type: OTT platform
- Founded: 1 December 2011; 14 years ago
- Country of origin: United Kingdom
- Founder: Jason Njoku
- CEO: Jason Njoku
- Products: Nigerian Nollywood movies
- Services: Provides paid-for Nigerian films on-demand (online streaming)
- Website: irokotv.com
- Launched: 1 December 2011
- Current status: Active

irokotv is a web platform that provides paid-for Nigerian films on-demand. It is one of Africa's first mainstream online movie streaming websites, providing access to over 5,000 Nollywood film titles. irokotv is a part of iROKO Limited, which is one of Africa's entertainment companies.

irokotv was launched on 1 December 2011. Its parent company, iROKO Partners, was founded by Jason Njoku and Bastian Gotter in December 2010, with its headquarters in London, United Kingdom. irokotv is one of the world's legal digital distributors of African movies.

Whilst living in London, iroko's co-founder, Jason Njoku, realised how popular African movies had become. Despite a growing worldwide demand, there was no legal option to watch movies from his home country. He therefore decided to take matters into his own hands and negotiate licensing deals with local Nigerian producers.

== History ==
The irokotv website was launched on 1 December 2011 by iROKO Partners, who are the licensors and distributors of Nollywood movies. Jason Njoku, the company's CEO and Bastian Gotter, now COO, met whilst students together at the University of Manchester together.

Njoku made several attempts to set up his own companies in the immediate years after university, but failed on each attempt. Njoku was inspired to start the company when he found it difficult to obtain Nollywood movies online for his mother, who he was living with at the time. Having researched the Nollywood industry, and noting the lack of infrastructure in place for international distribution of the movies, Njoku flew to Lagos, Nigeria, and purchased the online licenses of Nollywood movies directly from the producers. Having struck a deal with YouTube in Germany, he used the Google-owned platform to stream the licensed Nollywood movies, for free, on his channel, Nollywoodlove. The channel became hugely popular and was profitable in a short period of time and was the focus of a number of press features in international press, including CNBC, CNN and Techcrunch. The success of Nollywoodlove led to a successful investment from US-based hedge fund Tiger Global Management, who led a two-round investment totalling US$8 million, making it one of the investments into a West African Dot-com venture. A further investment round of $2m, led by Swedish-based hedge fund Kinnevik, followed in July 2012. The company has, in total, raised $25m of investment, making it one of the funded West African internet companies.

irokotv works with most of Nollywood's top film production houses and purchases the exclusive online licenses to their films, In an attempt to distribute Nollywood films to a global audience. The company's audience is predominantly in the Diaspora, with top five countries including the United States, the United Kingdom, Canada, (Germany) and Italy. Njoku is known as a pioneer in African tech start-ups.

== Platforms ==
=== Services ===
irokotv operates a subscription business model where users can access Nollywood movies via an Android App in Africa, and via an app or online in the West. In June 2015, iROKOtv CEO and co-founder, Jason Njoku announced that the company will be shutting down the website and streaming service in Africa, and shifting to mobile only from July that year.

=== Offices ===
In 2012, the company opened offices in London and New York and in 2013, the company added a further office in Johannesburg.

== Distribution ==
irokotv's main offering is an internet video streaming platform of selected Nollywood titles (both English and Yoruba films). The platform currently has around 5,000 movies on the platform, which equals approx 10,000 hours of content. The company has also forged partnerships with leading global technology firms, including Nokia, who launched the irokotv App on the Nokia Lumia in January 2013.

Since 2014, the company has also moved into global offline distribution, and supplies a number of airlines with Nollywood content, including British Airways, South African Airways, Emirates, Kenya Airways and United Airlines

irokotv maintains content distribution deals with YouTube, Dailymotion, iTunes, Amazon and Vimeo. The company also has content partnership deals with Tigo, Nollywood Movies, The Africa Channel and Nollywood TV. In March 2015, iROKOtv launched a new feature that will enable subscribers download movies for later offline viewing.

In April 2015, iROKO began to move some of its content offline and launched two new TV channels, iROKO Play and iROKO Plus on Africa's StarTimes, to which Jason Njoku commented "We're known primarily for leading OTT content delivery across Africa through irokotv.com, but with digital migration spreading rapidly throughout the continent, now is the right time for us to diversify our distribution model and expand into the Linear TV market."

== Awards and nominations ==
In 2017, iROKO TV won the 'Online Television With Best Movie Content Award' at the City People Movie Awards.
