= Gregory Ojefua =

Nigerian actor

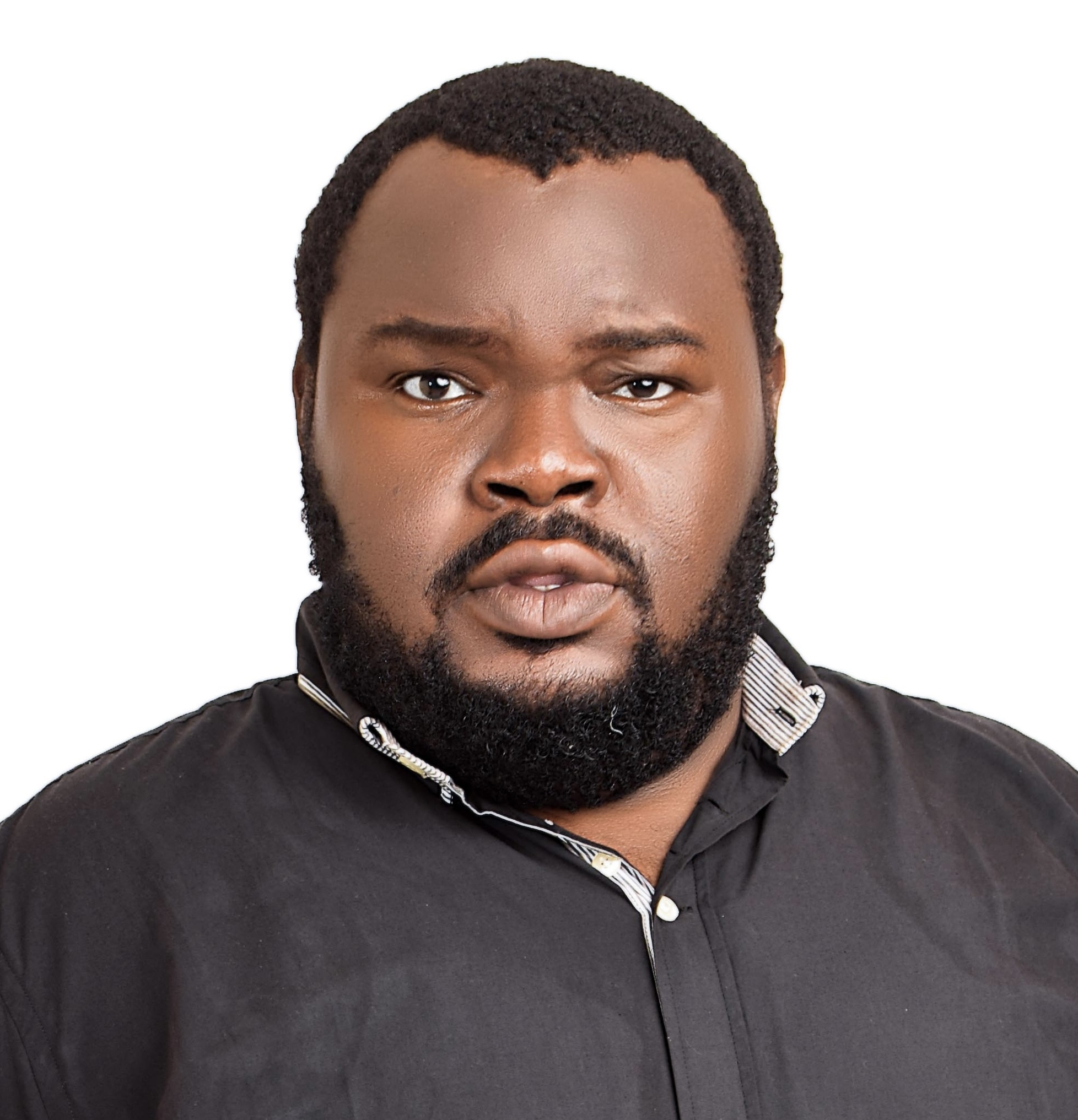
- Born: Igueben, Edo State, Nigeria
- Citizenship: Nigerian
- Education: Adekunle Ajasin University
- Occupations: Actor, voice actor, film producer
- Years active: 2009–present
- Notable work: Gold Statue, It's Her Day, Dwindle, Òlòtūré

Gregory Ojefua (born on July 3) also known as Greg "Teddy Bear" Ojefua is a Nigerian actor, voice actor, and film producer.

== Early life and education ==
Ojefua hails from Igueben, Edo State, Nigeria but was born in Lagos, Nigeria, where he completed his primary and high school education in his hometown before attending the Adekunle Ajasin University in Ondo State where he studied Business Management and Administration.

== Career ==
Ojefua started acting at a young age but professionally broke into the scene in 2015 with his performance in various television series and films. Ojefua has played numerous roles in both film and television. He gained recognition for his portrayal of Odumegwu Ojukwu in the short film The Encounter.

== Filmography ==
Year	Title	Role	Notes/Ref.
2014	Up Creek Without a Paddle	Asari Dokubo	Directed by Tarila Thompson, the cast includes; Van Vicker, Omotola Jalade Ekeinde, Beverly Naya, and Michael Ihnow
2015	The Banker	Obi	Directed by Ikechukwu Onyeka, other cast include; Belinda Effah, Mbong Amata, Seun Akindele
2015	The Encounter	General Emeka	Directed by Tolu Ajayi
2016	It's Her Day	Omonigho	Directed by Aniedi Anwah and produced by Bovi
2016	The Arbitration	Chijioke Utah	Directed by Niyi Akinmolayan, other casts include; Somkele Iyamah, Ireti Doyle, OC Ukeje and Beverly Naya
2016	Just Not Married	Ekun	Directed by Uduak Obong Patrick, other casts include; Seun Aflabi, Ijeoma Grace Agu, Stan Nze and Rotimi Salami
2016	Suru L'ere	Brume	Directed by Mildred Okwo, other casts include; Kemi Lala Akindoju, Rita Dominic, Seun Ajayi
2016	Men in Trouble	Nick	Directed by Paul Omoruyi
2016	Virgin Bride		Directed by Sobe Charles Umeh
2016	Jimi Bendel	D.P.O John	Directed by Ehizojie Ojesebholo
2017	Omoye	Reverend Father	Directed by Uche Chukwu, other casts include; Kiki Omeili, Rotimi Salami, Omobola Akinde
2017	The Women	Chubi Enweuzo	Directed by Blessing Effiom Egbe, other casts include; Rita Dominic, Kate Henshaw, Omoni Oboli, and Femi Branch
2017	Bariga Sugar	Soldier	Directed by Ifeoma Nkiruka Chukwuogo, other casts include; Tina Mba, Lucy Ameh, Halima Olarewaju
2017	Trace	Gebu	Directed by Olu Alvin, other casts include; Blossom Chukwujekwu, Bhaira Mcwizu, and Yvonne Enakhena
2017	Pursuit		Directed by Fiyin Gambo
2017	The Panic Room Encounters	Chief Detective Tare	Directed by Wayde Wonder
2018	Oga Bolaji	Omo	Directed by Kayode Kasum, other cast include; Ikponmwosa Gold and Omowumi Dada
2018	Nigerian Prince	Henry	Directed by Faraday Okoro, other cast include; Antonio J Bell, Chinaza Uche, Bimbo Manuel, Tina Mba
2019	The Coffin Salesman	Uwem's Friend	Imoh Umoren
2019	Truth & Tidings	Emenike	Directed by Emeka Bishop Nwabunze, other cast include; Frederick Leonard and Rachel Oniga
2019	Three Thieves	Rukevwe's Boss	Directed by Udoka Oyeka, casts include; Angel Unigwe, Shawn Faqua, Enado Odigie, Odunlade Adekola
2019	Gold Statue	Rambo	Director by Tade Ogidan, other cast include; Gabriel Afolayan, Kunle Remi, Richard Mofe-Damijo, and Sola Sobowale
2020	Son of Mercy	Biggie	Directed by Amen Imasuen, cast include; Alex Ekubo, Linda Osifo and Kelvin Ikeduba
2020	Soft Work	Nonso	Directed by Darasen Richards, cast include; IK Ogbonna, Alex Ekubo and Shaffy Bello
2020	Dear Bayo	Mugabe	Directed by Imoh Umoren, other cast include; Martha Ehinome and Kelechi Udegbe
2021	Finding Forever	Kene	Directed by Emeka Madu, cast include; Mike Godson and Debby Felix
2021	What Happened at St James		Directed by Marc Adebesin, cast include; Zack Orji, Ken Erics and Chimezie Imo
2021	April Showers		Directed by Richards Omos-Iboyi, other cast include; Kunle Remi, Pere Egbi and Lilian Esoro
2021	Country Hard	Dinma's Landlord	Directed by Paul Utomi, other cast include; Theresa Edem, Timini Egbuson and Kehinde Bankole
2021	Beautifool		Directed by Richard Omos Iboyi, other cast include; Kunle Remi, Tana Adelana and Kelvin Ikeduba
2021	Collision Course	TARS Commander	Director by Bolanle Austen-Peters, other cast include; Chioma Chukwuka, Daniel Etim Effiong and Zainab Balogun
2021	Dwindle	Oga Landlord	Directed by Kayode Kasum
2022	The Hookup		Directed by Uyoyou Adia
2022	Prayers For Nina		Directed by Kabat Esosa Egbon
2022	Inside Life		Directed by Clarence Peters, other cast include Jide Kosoko and Scarlet Gomez
2022	Over Her Dead Body	Rasco	Directed by Sola Osofisan, other cast include; Nse Ikpe-Etim and Binta Ayo Mogaji
2023	Fill in Station		Cast include; Elma Mbadiwe
2023	The Trade	Ebuka	Directed by Jadesola Osiberu, other cast include; Blossom Chukwujekwu, Angel Unigwe, Shawn Faqua, and Chiwetalu Agu
2023	Badcop	Juma	Directed by Abbey Abimbola, other cast include; Ali Nuhu, Etinosa Idemudia, Allwell Ademola, Geoff Andre Feyaerts
2023	This Is Lagos	Omo Dada	Directed by Kenneth Gyang, other cast include; Mike Afolarin, Gabriel Afolayan, Kate Henshaw, and Enyinna Nwigwe
2023	A Tribe Called Judah	Pluto	Directed by Funke Akindele, Adeoluwa Owu, Edited by Valentine Chukwuma

== Awards and nominations ==
Ojefua got a nomination for Best Actor in a Drama at the Africa Magic Viewers' Choice Awards (AMVCA) in 2017, He was awarded Best Actor at the Africa International Film Festival (AFRIFF) in 2023.

== See also ==
- List of Nigerian actors
