= List of Nigerian films of 2020 =

This is a list of Nigerian films scheduled for theatrical release in 2020.

== 2020 ==
=== January–March ===
| Opening | | Title | Director | Cast | Genre | Notes | Ref. |
|---|---|---|---|---|---|---|---|
| J A N U A R Y | 3 | Akpe: Return of the Beast | Toka McBaror | Jide Kosoko Juliet Ibrahim Bolanle Ninalowo Daniel Lloyd | Comedy | Streaming on Ibakatv | |
| J A N U A R Y | 24 | The Legend of Inikpi | Frank Rajah Arase | Mercy Johnson Okojie Sam Dede Odunlade Adekola Saidi Balogun Paul Obazele | Historical Drama | | |
| J A N U A R Y | 31 | Small Chops | Robert Peters | Eucharia Anunobi Nkem Owoh Rachael Okonkwo Hafiz Oyetoro Toyin Abraham | Drama | | |
| F E B R U A R Y | 14 | Special Jollof | Emem Isong | Joseph Benjamin Uche Jombo Femi Adebayo | Romantic comedy drama | | |
| F E B R U A R Y | 14 | Dear Affy | Samuel Olatunji | Toyin Abraham Enyinna Nwigwe Kehinde Bankole Odunlade Adekola | Romantic comedy | | |
| F E B R U A R Y | 14 | Muddled | Best Okoduwa | Belinda Effah Sophie Alakija Felix Ugo Omokhodion Kunle Remi | Drama | | |
| F E B R U A R Y | 28 | The Cock-Tale | Joshua Ojo | Ronke Ojo Olaniyi Afonja Lanre Hassan Saheed Balogun | Comedy Drama | | |
| F E B R U A R Y | 28 | Handicapped | Seun Arowojolu | Valerie Udemba Rotimi Salami Kunle Idowu Chimezie Imo | Drama | | |
| F E B R U A R Y | 28 | Who's the boss | Naz Onuzo | Funke Akindele Blossom Chukwujekwu Segun Arinze Ini Dima-Okojie | Romantic comedy | | |
| M A R C H | 13 | The Journey of the S | Hafeez Adeyemi | | Drama | About Sickle cell disease | |
| M A R C H | 20 | Unroyal | Moses Inwang | Shaffy Bello Blossom Chukwujekwu IK Ogbonna Linda Osifo | Contemporary royal drama | | |
| M A R C H | 20 | Mama Drama | Seyi Babatope | Osas Ighodaro Kehinde Bankole Kunle Remi Shaffy Bello | Comedy drama | | |
| M A R C H | 27 | Our Jesus Story | Tchidi Chikere | Eucharia Anunuobi Zack Orji Sam Dede | Thriller | | |

=== September ===
| Opening | | Title | Director | Cast | Genre | Notes | Ref. |
|---|---|---|---|---|---|---|---|
| S E P T E M B E R | 20 | Soft Work | Darasen Richards | Frank Donga Akin Lewis Shaffy Bello Sanni Mu’azu IK Ogbonna | Action drama | | |

=== October–December ===
| Opening | | Title | Director | Cast | Genre | Notes | Ref. |
|---|---|---|---|---|---|---|---|
| O C T O B E R | 1 | Fate of Alakada: The Party Planner | Kayode Kasum | Toyin Abraham Mercy Eke Broda Shaggi | Action comedy | Fourth film in the Alakada franchise | |
| O C T O B E R | 7 | Kakanfo | David Dida Tella | Bimbo Oshin Antar Laniyan Dele Odule | Adventure drama | | |
| O C T O B E R | 9 | This Lady Called Life | Kayode Kasum | Bisola Aiyeola Efa Iwara | Drama | | |
| O C T O B E R | 9 | Rise of the Saints | Samuel O . Olateru | Deyemi Okanlawon Rachel Oniga Tina Mba | Drama | | |
| O C T O B E R | 11 | Lemonade | Lummie Edevibe | Kunle Remi Ayoola Ayolola Dino Melaye Linda Osifo | Drama | | |
| O C T O B E R | 16 | Lagos to Abuja Coach | Olamide Balogun | Akin Lewis Adunni Ade Tina Mba Maryam Booth | Drama | | |
| N O V E M B E R | 6 | Citation | Kunle Afolayan | Temi Otedola Jimmy Jean-Lewis Kunle Afolayan Joke Silva Ibukun Awosika | Drama | Citation rose to the sixth-most popular film on Netflix shortly after its release, and was most-watched on Netflix in Nigeria | |
| N O V E M B E R | 6 | Ratnik | Dimeji Ajibola | Osas Ighodaro Bolanle Ninalowo Adunni Ade Karibi Fubara | Science fiction | | |
| N O V E M B E R | 13 | Rattlesnake: The Ahanna story | Ramsey Nouah | Stan Nze Osas Ighodaro Bucci Franklin Efa Iwara | Crime drama | Remake of Amaka Igwe's 1995Rattlesnake | |
| N O V E M B E R | 13 | The Good Husband | Dickson Iroegbu | Monalisa Chinda Coker Francis Duru Sam Dede Bassey Ekpeyong Bassey | Drama | | |
| N O V E M B E R | 20 | The New Normal | Teni Olatoni | Richard Mofe Damijo Mercy Johnson-Okojie Kehinde Bankole Bimbo Akintola | Drama | | |
| N O V E M B E R | 20 | LOUD | Umanu Ojochenemi Elijah | Wole Ojo Eucharia Anunobi Timini Egbuson Sophie Alakija | Musical | | |
| N O V E M B E R | 27 | Introducing the Kujus | Biodun Stephen | Bisola Aiyeloa Femi Jacobs Bimbo Ademoye Timini Egbusen | Comedy drama | | |
| N O V E M B E R | 3 | The Milkmaid | Desmond Ovbiagele | Anthonieta Kalunta Gambo Usman Kona Maryam Booth | Drama | It was selected as the Nigerian entry for the Best International Feature Film at the 93rd Academy Awards | |
| D E C E M B E R | 4 | Finding Hubby | Femi Ogunsanwo | Ade Laoye Kehinde Bankole Munachi Abii Efa Iwara | | | |
| D E C E M B E R | 10 | Ogbo Nke Ajuala | Uzoma Sunday Logicman | Emeka Ani Chiwetalu Agu Uzoma Sunday Logicman Dom Onu | Adventure drama | | |
| D E C E M B E R | 10 | 11 | Lady Buckit and the Motley Monsters | Adebisi Adetayo | Bimbo Akintola Patrick Doyle Kalu Ikeagwu | Animation | Nigeria's first feature-length animated movie |
| D E C E M B E R | 10 | 11 | Quam's Money | Kayode Kasum | Folarin ‘Falz’ Falana Nse Ikpe Etim Toni Tones Williams Uchemba Michelle Dede | Comedy | Sequel to New Money |
| D E C E M B E R | Son of Mercy | 11 | Amen Imasuen | Alex Ekubo Linda Osifo Kevin Ikeduba Gregory Ojefua | Thriller | | |
| D E C E M B E R | 18 | Nneka the pretty serpent | Tosin Igho | Idia Aisien Ndidi Obi Kenneth Okolie Beverly Osu Beverly Naya | Thriller | A remake of Zeb Ejiro's 1994 thriller | |
| 25 | Omo Ghetto: The Saga | Funke Akindele JJC Skillz | Funke Akindele Chioma Akpotha Eniola Badmus Bimbo Thomas Alex Ekubo | Comedy | Currently the highest grossing Nollywood movie of all time | | |

== See also ==
- 2020 in Nigeria
- List of Nigerian films

== Notes ==
Theatrical releases were limited due to the COVID-19 pandemic in Nigeria.
