= 2022 Africa Magic Viewers' Choice Awards =

8th Africa Magic Viewers' Choice Awards
- Date: 7 May 2022

Highlights
- Best Film: Amina
- Best Actor: Stan Nze
- Best Actress: Osas Ighodaro
- Lifetime achievement: Taiwo Ajai-Lycett
- Most nominations: Amina

The 2022 Africa Magic Viewers' Choice Awards held on Saturday, 14 May 2022 at Eko Hotel and Suites in Lagos. It was set an 8-day event which started on Saturday, 7 May 2022, unlike previous 1 day events.

The nominees were revealed by actors Adesua Etomi-Wellington and Daniel Etim Effiong on Saturday 19 March 2022 in a ceremony. A total of 33 categories were announced, 12 of which are open to public voting. Best Online Social Content Creator was introduced as a new category.

The winner in the Best Soundtrack category won a ₦1 million prize.

Stan Nze and Osas Ighodaro won the award in the Best Actor and Best Actress in a drama respectively for their roles in Rattlesnake: The Ahanna Story. Ramsey Nouah won the Best Director award for the same film. Other award winners include Funke Akindele and Broda Shaggi in the Best Actor and Best Actress in a comedy categories. Amina by Izu Ojukwu & Okey Ogunjiofor win the award for the best overall film.

== Awards ==
Winners are listed highlighted in boldface

Best Actress in A Comedy	Best Actor in A Comedy
**Funke Akindele - Omo Ghetto: The Saga**; Bimbo Ademoye - Breaded Life; Bisola Aiyeola - Dwindle; Nancy Isime - Kambili: The Whole 30 Yards; Nse Nkpe Etim - Quams Money; Sarah Hassan - Just In Time	**Broda Shaggi - Dwindle**; Deyemi Okanlawon - Omo Ghetto: The Saga; Femi Adebayo - Progressive Tailors Club; Gideon Okeke - Loving Rona; Shawn Faqua - Soole; Timini Egbuson - Ponzi; Williams Uchemba - Dear Affy
Best Supporting Actress	Best Supporting Actor
**Omowunmi Dada - Country Hard**; Bisola Aiyeola - Sugar Rush; Chioma Chukwuka Akpotha - Omo Ghetto: The Saga; Clarion Chukwurah - Amina; Enado Odigie - The New Normal; Mercy Johnson - The New Normal; Mumbi Maina - La Femme Anjola	**Odunlade Adekola - Jankariwo**; Adjete Anang - Gold Coast Lounge; Bucci Franklin - Rattlesnake: The Ahanna Story; Eric Roberts - A Soldier’s Story; Magaji Mijinyawa - Amina; Tope Tedela - Country Hard
Best Actress in A Drama	Best Actor in A Drama
**Osas Ighodaro - Rattlesnake: The Ahanna Story**; Asabe Madaki - Voiceless; Bisola Aiyeola - This Lady Called Life; Genoveva Umeh - A Tune Away; Kehinde Bankole - Dear Affy; Meg Otanwa - For Maria Ebun Pataki; Nancy Isime - Superstar	**Stan Nze - Rattlesnake: The Ahanna Story**; Efa Iwara - This Lady Called Life; Eyinna Nwigwe - Dear Affy; Femi Jacobs - Introducing the Kujus; Gabriel Afolayan - For Maria Ebun Pataki; Timini Egbuson - Introducing the Kujus
Best Short Film or Online Video	Best Indigenous Language – Yoruba
**Taiwo Ogunnimo - I Am the Prostitute Mama Described**; Abimbola Craig - Fractured; Korede Olayinka - Kiitan; Mary Nsikanabasi Uyoh - Something About Zee; Nicholas ‘Big Ghun’ Nartey - Koro; Ozor Uche - Ounje Ale; Sandra Tetteh - Dices	**David Akande, Demola Yusuf and Edgard Leroy - Alaise**; Bukunmi Oluwasina - Jankariwo; Olamide Akinmolayan - Balokun; Olapeju Wahab - Ijolewa; Samuel Oniyitan - Abeke; Wunmi Ajiboye - Arodan
Best Indigenous Language – Hausa	Best Indigenous Language – Igbo
**Rogers Ofime - Voiceless**; Abdulkadir Nuhu Aminu - Tsangayar Asali; Abubakar Bashir Maishadda - Sarki Goma Zamani Goma; Abubakar Bashir Maishadda - Bana Bakwai; Diane Russet And Ayo Newo - Bayi	**Uche Nnanna Maduka - Nne-Ka**; Oma Nnadi - Udene; Victor Iyke - Uhuruchi-Sunset; Victor Onwudiwe and Ugomma Onwe - Echezona
Best Indigenous Language – Swahili	Best Art Director
**Obambo - Freddy Feruzi**; Jaramandia - Dennis Humphrey, Bernard Kahindi; Rishai - Omar Hamza Hassan	**Tunji Afolayan - Amina**; Adeoye Adetunji - Introducing the Kuju’s; Chima Adighije - One Lagos Night; Chris Udomi - Day of Destiny; Ediri Okwa - The Smart Money Woman; Mayowa Labiran - The Mystic River; Pat Nebo - Rattlesnake: The Ahanna Story
Best Costume Designer	Best Lighting Designer
**Millicent T. Jack - Amina**; Funke Akindele Bello - Omo Ghetto: The Saga; Isoken Ogiemwonyi - The Smart Money Woman; Obijie Oru - The Mystic River; Titi Aina Raji - Voiceless; Yoanna ‘Pepper’ Chikezie - Nneka The Pretty Serpent; Yolanda Okereke - La Femme Anjola	**Mathew Yusuf - Rattlesnake: The Ahanna Story**; Fei Mustapha - Dear Affy; Godwin Lawani - Light In The Dark; Jaco Strauss - The White Line; Mathew Yusuf - Nneka the Pretty Serpent; Stanley Ibegbu Okechukwu - Amina; Yemi Awoponle - The Mystic River
Best Picture Editor	Best Sound Editor
**Tunde Apalowo - For Maria Ebun Pataki**; Dolapo Adeleke - Just In Time; JJC Skillz, Adeyemi Shomade and Valentine Chukwuma - Omo Ghetto - The Saga; Moses Inwang - Bad Comments; Rogers Ofime - Voiceless; Tega Salubi - Collision Course; Tester Bassey, Abiodun Okunola and Moses Inwang - Lockdown	**Jim Lively and James Nelson - Amina**; Bayo Adepetun And Biola ‘Lala’ Olayinka - Prophetess; Habib Adebayo Olaore - Nneka the Pretty Serpent; Hassan Mageye - Tinka’s Story; Puffy Tee - Omo Ghetto: The Saga; Tom Koroluk - For Maria Ebun Pataki
Best Sound Track	Best Make Up
**Pascal Aka And Raquel - Gold Coast Lounge**; Awele Mekwunye And Bizzouch - Light In The Dark; Boumeester Lindsay & Kagwe Mungai - Just In Time; Collision Course; Dabs Agwom - Amina; Larry Gaaga - Rattlesnake: The Ahanna Story; Michael Pulse And Ponti Dikuua - The White Line	**Balogun Abiodun - Omo Ghetto The Saga**; Abiola Popoola - La Femme Anjola; Adewunmi Fatai And Ayobami Abolarin - Peregun; Carina Ojoko - Rattlesnake: The Ahanna Story; Dagogo Diminas And Gabriel Okorie Gabazzini - Amina; Gift Ameh - Voiceless; Ugochinyere Ihendi - Nneka the Pretty Serpent
Best Writer	Best Cinematographer
**Manie Oiseomaye, Donald Tombia and Biodun Stephen - Introducing the Kujus’**; Abosi Ogba, Sally Kenneth Dadzie, Lydia Idakula Sobogun, Olawale Adetula And Belinda Yanga Agedah - Little Black Book; Chigozirim Nwanegbo - One Lagos Night; Frank Chinedu Uba - Amina; Toluwani Obayan And Kayode Kasum - This Lady Called Life; Tunde Babalola - La Femme Anjola; Tunray Femi And Damilola E. Orimogunje - For Maria Ebun Pataki	**Muhammed Atta Ahmed - Rattlesnake: The Ahanna Story**; Barnabas Emordi - Superstar; James Amuta - Collision Course; John Njaga Demps - Nneka the Pretty Serpent; Peter Kreil, Wale Adebayo, Samuel Jonathan and Moruf Fadaro - Amina; Samuel Jonathan And Moruf Fadaro - The Mystic River; Victoria Ombogo - Just In Time
Best Movie Southern Africa	Best Movie East Africa
**Dantagos Jimmy-Melani - Hairareb**; David Kazadi - Black Dollar; Dumie Manyathela - Veza – The Unfolding; Paul.S.Wilo - Maria Kristu	**Morocco Omari & Loukman Ali - The Girl in the Yellow Jumper - Winner**; Ayeny T. Steve - Beautiful Ashes; Denise Kibisu Ngubuini - A Grand Little Lie; Ndagire Mariam - My Husband’s Wife; Raphael Emmanuel - Ugonwa Wa Kifo; Sarah Hassan And Dolapo Adeleke - Just In Time
Best Movie West Africa	Best Overall Movie
**Bolanle Austen-Peter, Joseph Umoibom and James Amuta- Collision Course**; Okey Ogunjiofor - Amina; Biodun Stephen and Tara Ajibulu - Breaded Life; Chris Odeh - Nneka The Pretty Serpent; Funke Akindele Bello and Jjc Skillz - Omo Ghetto: The Saga; Chris Odeh - Rattlesnake: The Ahanna Story; Orwi Manny Ameh - Tainted Canvas	**Izu Ojukwu And Okey Ogunjiofor - Amina**; Bolanle Austen-Peters - Collision Course; Dolapo Adeleke And Sarah Hassan - Just In Time; Jjc Skillz And Funke Akindele Bello - Omo Ghetto: The Saga; Mildred Okwo And Rita Dominic - La Femme Anjola; Ramsey Nouah And Chris Odeh - Rattlesnake: The Ahanna Story; Robert O. Peters and Rogers Ofime - Voiceless; Tosin Igho And Chris Odeh - Nneka the Pretty Serpent
Best Television Series	The Multichoice Talent Factory
**Rogers Ofime - The Mystic River**; Arese Ugwu/Isoken Ogiemwonyi/Lala Akindoju/ Akintunde Marine Marinho - The Smart Money Woman; Mwaka Nakweti - Bukutu; Olawale Adetula - Little Black Book; Olawale Adetula - My Name A-Zed; Olufunke Akindele - Jenifa’s Diary; Vincent Nwachukwu - Rumour Has It Season 3	**Daisy Masembe - Engaito**; Abisola Aboaba - Bride Untangled; Brian Ontiri - Rebirth; Christine Boateng And Eric Okyerefo - Oko K3 Akueteh; Masuzyo Mwale, Cosmas Ngandwe, Abel Ngoma and Edward Sakala - Nyau
Best Director	Best Documentary
**Ramsey Nouah - Rattlesnake: The Ahanna Story**; Bolanle Austen-Peters - Collision Course; Ekene Som Mekwunye - Light In The Dark; Hamisha Daryani Ahuja - Namaste Wahala; Izu Ojukwu - Amina; Mildred Okwo - La Femme Anjola; Robert O. Peters - Voiceless	**Saitabao Kaiyare, Mumo Liku, Elena Schilling, Daniella Fritz, Ann Katrina Boberg - If Objects Could Speak**; Allen Onyige - Sunset in Makoko; Eugene Mbugua - This Love; Femi Odugbemi - Unmasked: Leadership, Trust and The Covid 19 Pandemic in Nigeria; Lawrence Adejumo - Streets of Lagos: Dear Little People; Taiwo Adeyemi - Road2blow
Best Online Social Content Creator	Best Africa Magic Original Drama Series
**Oga Sabinus- Mr Funny**; Bukunmi Adeaga-Ilori - Kayamata; Edem Victor - First Date – Mummy’s Boy; Elozonam Ogbolu - Affiah-De Ja Vu; Jacqueline Suowari - Of Line and Layers; Mr Macaroni - Multi Personality Disorder; Taaooma - Road Rage; Tee Kuro - Nollywood Epic Love Story 1& 2-Parody	**Dimbo Atiya - Rishante**; Femi Odugbemi - Movement: Japa; James Omokwe - Riona; Tosin Igho & Rogba Arimoro - Venge; Uche Ikejimba - Unmarried; Uche Ikejimba - Dilemma; Victor Sanchez Aghahowa - Enakhe; Winifred Nwokedi - Eve
Best Africa Magic Original Comedy Series	Best Dressed Male
**Rogers Ofime - The Johnsons**; Bright Okpocha and Solomon Adekunle - My Flatmates; Funke Akindele Bello and JJC Skillz - My Siblings & I	**Denola Grey**
Best Dressed Female	Industry Merit Award
**Osas Ighodaro**	**Taiwo Ajayi-Lycett**
Trailblazer Award	Longest running TV show in Africa
**Teniola Aladese**	**Tinsel**
