= 2020 Best of Nollywood Awards =

Award ceremony

- Date: 5 December 2020
- Location: Ado-Ekiti, Ekiti State
- Country: Nigeria
- Hosted by: Tana Adelana and Debo Macaroni

The 2020 Best of Nollywood Awards was the 12th edition of the ceremony and took place in Ado-Ekiti, Ekiti State on 5 December 2020. The event was co-hosted by Tana Adelana and Debo Macaroni while the Ekiti State governor, Kayode Fayemi served as the chief host.

Living in Bondage: Breaking Free by Charles Okpaleke and This Lady Called Life by Kayode Kasum were identified as the biggest winners of the awards show.

== Awards ==
Best Actor in a Lead role – English	Best Actor in a Lead role –Yoruba
JKA Swanky – Living in Bondage:Breaking Free; Efa Iwara – The Sessions; Timini Egbuson – Elevator Baby; Eyinna Nwigwe – Dear Affy; Daniel K. Daniel – The Fugitive; Femi Jacobs – Colours of Deceit	Ibrahim Yekini – Lucifer; Jide Awobona – You Are Me; Lateef Adedimeji – Etan; Akin Kolapo – Asarailu; Joseph Momodu – Torera; Funso Adeolu - Digiola
Best Actress in a Lead role –English	Best Actress in a Lead role –Yoruba
Omowunmi Dada – The Sessions; Bisola Aiyeola – This Lady Called Life; Kehinde Bankole – Dear Affy; Toyin Abraham – Elevator Baby; Toni Tones – Killing Jade; Adesua Etomi – Sugar Rush	Adebimpe Oyebade – Agbelebu Jade; Bukunmi Oluwashina – You Are Me; Nkechi Blessing – Torera; King Flakie – Digiola; Abisola Adebayo – Never Too Late
Best Supporting Actor –English	Best Supporting Actress – English
Alex Ekubo – Bling Lagosians; Williams Uchemba/Tobi Bakre – Sugar Rush; Byran Emmanuel – Colours of Deceit; Tope Tedela – Country Hard; Blossom Chukwujekwu/Abayomi Alvin – Unroyal	Bimbo Ademoye/Bisola Aiyeola – Sugar Rush; Banke Joye – Traffic; Ruth Kadiri – Too Old For This; Sharon Ooja – Bling Lagosians; Tina Mba – This Lady Called Life
Best Actor in a Lead role –Igbo	Best Actress in a Lead role –Igbo
Francis Duru – Mboputa; Stan Nze – Ishi Anyaocha; JKA Swanky – Nne	Happy Julian Uchendu – Mboputa; Chidiebere Aneke – Ishi Anyaocha; Frances Nsonwu Ikoroha – Nne
Most Promising Actor	Most Promising Actress
Denola Grey – Bling Lagosians; Tobi Bakare – Sugar Rush; Obinna Montero – Too Old for This	Aisha Mohammed – Colours of Deceit; Banke Joye – Traffic; Motilola Adekunle – To Have and To Hold; Chinelo Enemchukwu – Perfect Marriage; Mary John – Perfect Marriage
Best Supporting Actor –Yoruba	Best Supporting Actress –Yoruba
Femi Adebayo/Kelvin Ikedua – Lucifer; Yomi Olorunlolaye/Olaide Almoruf – Brothers; Bimbo Sunday – Asarailu; Odunlade Adekola – Never Too Late; Dele Odule – Agbelebu Jade	Abisola Adebayo – Agbelebu Jade; Khadija Ayoade – You Are Me; Regina Chukwu – Digiola; Ashabi Ademefun – Brothers; Ireti Osayemi – Never Too Late
Best Child Actor	Best Child Actress
Molawa Onajobi – This Lady Called Life; Daniel Adeshina – Basil; Divine Godwin Otun – Innocent; King David Akpakwu – My Grandfather's Wife; Chima David Ntongha – The Pain Your Storm	Amarachi Onwe – Secrets; Chimamanda Unigwe - Perfect Marriage
Movie with the Best Sound	Best Movie with Social message
Unroyal; Living in Bondage; Kambili	The Session; Not So Long a Letter; WEDE; Black Monday; Dan Kasa; Country Hard
Movie with the Best Special Effect	Movie with the Best Screenplay
Living in Bondage(Breaking Free); Lucifer; Unroyal; Sugar Rush	This Lady Called Life; Bling Lagosians; Elevator Baby; The Sessions; Living in Bondage (Breaking Free); Dear Affy
Best Short Film	Best Documentary
Pole Girl; Dial 112; The Honourable; Dan kasa; The Bean Hawker	Tame The Serial Killer; Journey to Gambia; Learners
Best Use of Nigerian Food in a Movie	Movie with the Best Editing
This Lady Called Life; Traffic; The Sessions; My Grandfather's Wife; WEDE	Living in Bondage:Breaking Free; This Lady Called Life; Sugar Rush; Elevator Baby; The Sessions
Movie with the Best Cinematography	Best Use of Nigerian Costume in a Movie
Bling Lagosians; Living in Bondage:Breaking Free; Unroyal; Sugar Rush; Dear Affy	Unroyal; Broken Water; WEDE; Living in Bondage:Breaking Free; Isodehi
Best Use of Make up in a Movie	Movie of the Year
Living in Bondage(Breaking Free); The Sessions; WEDE; Broken Water; Isodehi	Living in Bondage:Breaking Free; This Lady Called Life; The Sessions; WEDE; Sugar Rush; Elevator Baby
Director of the Year	Best Kiss in a Movie
Ramsey Nouah – Living in Bondage:Breaking Free; Kayode Kasum – This Lady Called Life; Lancelot Imasuen – WEDE; Akay Mason – Elevator Baby; Judith Audu- The Sessions; Kayode Kasum – Sugar Rush	Laura Fidel/Kunle Remi - Pole Girl; Alex Ekubo/Sharon Ooja – Bling Lagosians; JKA Swanky/Munachi Abii – Living in Bondage (Breaking Free); Omowunmi Dada/Efa Iwara – The Sessions; IK Ogbonna/Matilda Lambert - Unroyal
Revelation of the Year –male	Revelation of the Year –female
Swanky JKA; Tunde Aderinoye; Fuad Ferdinand; Mike Afolarin; Moshood Fattah; Heavens Obule	Bolaji Ogunmola; Munachi Abi; Dami Awokoya; Mimi Daniels; Temi Otedola
Movie with the Best Production Design	Movie with the Best Soundtrack
This Lady Called Life; Unroyal; Living in Bondage:Breaking Free; WEDE; Isodehi; Broken Water	Colours of Deceit; Traffic; Living in Bondage; Lucifer; The Sessions; Country Hard
Movie with the Best Comedy	
Dear Affy; Elevator Baby; Bling Lagosians; Sugar Rush	
