= Reel Love (2025 film) =

- Directed by: Kayode Kasum
- Written by: Ife Olujuyigbe
- Produced by: Lara Ojelabi
- Starring: Timini Egbuson; TJ Omusuku; Atlanta Johnson; Bimbo Ademoye; Funke Akindele
- Production companies: Film Trybe; Nextrought; FilmOne Studios
- Distributed by: FilmOne Distributions
- Release date: 14 February 2025
- Country: Nigeria

Reel Love is a 2025 Nigerian romance film produced by Timini Egbuson and directed by Kayode Kasum. It was released in Nigerian cinemas on 14 February 2025 to commemorate Valentine's Day. It stars Timini Egbuson, Funke Akindele, Bimbo Ademoye, Shaffy Bello, Efa Iwara, Dakore Akande, Lilian Afegbai, and Muyiwa Ademola. The film, which is Timini Egbuson's debut production, explores themes of love, romance, and the modern-day impact of social media on love and relationships in general.

== Synopsis ==
Reel Love tells the story of Tomide, a popular relationship influencer who is entangled with Rachel when a video of them in a heated argument goes viral. The impact of the video caused damage and backlash for both individuals. Tomide's girlfriend, Imani, advises that Tomide stage a fake romantic relationship with Rachel. After several persuasions, Rachel and Tomide reluctantly agree to the deal, which is a success for both of them as they grow their social media presence and bag different deals.

The event turns against them when Rachel begins to fall in love with Tomide. On the other hand, Tomide starts growing affection for Rachel. Meanwhile, Tomide's girlfriend, Imani, becomes suspicious of the growing affection between Tomide and Rachel. In a bid to end the growing relationship, Imani leaks Tomide's deep secret to a whistleblower, leading to more drama.

== Selected cast ==
- Timini Egbuson as Tomide Jobi
- TJ Omusuku as Rachel Monday
- Atlanta Johnson as Imani
- Bimbo Ademoye as Chizaram
- Funke Akindele as Tomide's mother
- Muyiwa Ademola as Rachel's father
- Dakore Egbuson as Rachel's mentor

== Production and release ==
The film was released on Valentine's Day and marked TJ Omusuku's first feature film appearance, which she described as a positive debut. The black tie themed premiere featured Nollywood actors and actresses in attendance, including Ebuka Obi-Uchendu, Veekee James, Funke Akindele, Pretty Mike, and Mr Macaroni. Gaming platform BetKing also partnered with the film.
