= Mawuli Gavor =

Ghanaian actor

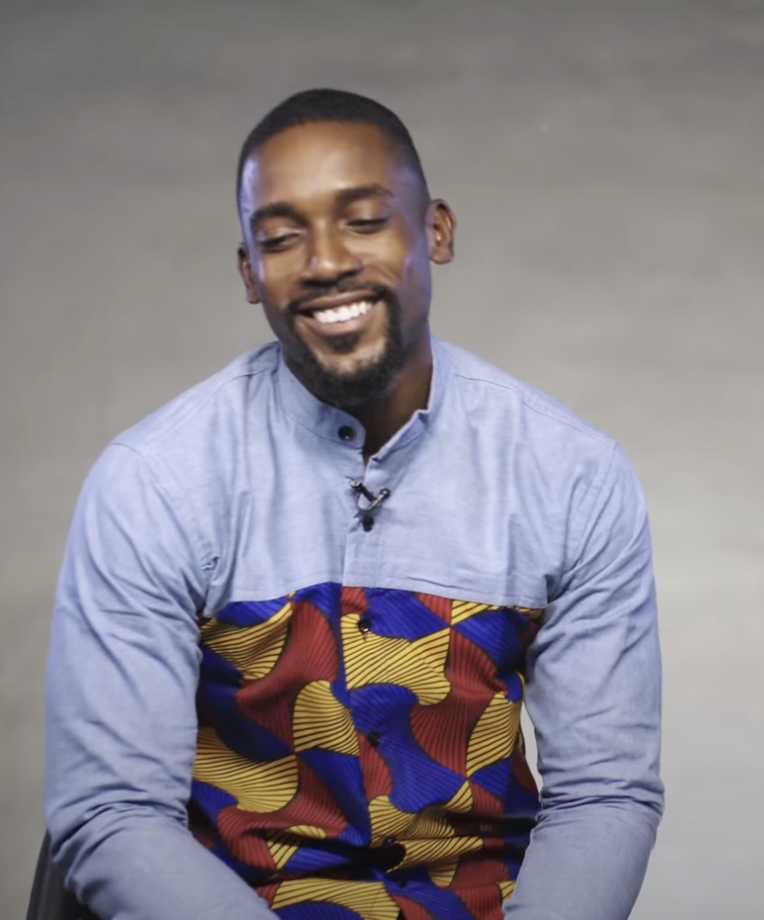
- Education: Franklin and Marshall College
- Occupations: Actor, television presenter, model, producer
- Awards: 2018 Best of Nollywood Awards

Mawuli Gavor is a Ghanaian actor, model, television presenter, entrepreneur, producer and former accountant.

== Early life and education ==
Gavor was born in Ghana. He studied business and finance at Franklin & Marshall College, Lancaster, Pennsylvania, USA.

== Career ==
Gavor began his career in the entertainment industry as a model while in the US as an undergraduate in business management and finance. After returning to Ghana, he worked as an accountant. In 2013, he became a brand ambassador to Martini and changed his career path. He transitioned into acting in Nollywood films and is known for his role in Obsession. He has appeared in several other productions.

In 2018, he produced two films and won the Best of Nollywood award for Best Kiss in a Movie alongside Odera Olivia Orji.

== Personal life ==
Gavor married his Indian girlfriend, Remya, in 2022.

He is a fitness enthusiast.

== Filmography ==
=== Films ===
Year	Title	Role	Notes	Ref
2014	Devil in the Detail	Sam	Alongside Nse Ikpe Etim and Adjetey Anang	
2015	A Place Called Happy	Kwame	Directed by Dolapo Adeleke	
2017	Obsession	Kamar	Directed by Uduak-Obong Patrick	
2017	Entangled		Alongside Ini Dima Okojie, Sika Osei and Efa Iwara	
2018	Chief Daddy	Damilare Kofi Mensah	Directed by Niyi Akinmolayan	
2018	The Eve		Alongside Adeolu Adefarasin and Beverly Naya	
2018	Pay day	Orlando	Alongside Baaj Adebule, Ame Aiyejina, Bisola Aiyeola	
2019	Sugar Rush	Dan	Alongside Bimbo Ademoye, Lateef Adedimeji, Bisola Aiyeola	
2019	Two Weeks in Lagos	Ejikeme	Directed by Kathryn Fasegha	
2019	She is	Rowland	Alongside Somkele Iyamah-Idhalama, Imeh Bishop Umoh and Chiwetalu Agu	
2020	Joseph	Kwaku	Also co-produced	
2020	Crossroads	Diamond Merchant	Directed Seyi Siwoku	
2020	Kambili: The Whole 30 Yards	John	Alongside Nancy Isime, Jide kene Achufisi	
2021	Just in Time	Kobena	Alongside Sarah Hassan and Stycie Wanjiku	
2021	Ponzi	Robert	Alongside Jide Kosoko, Tope Tedela and Timini Egbuson	
2021	A Lady and her Lover	Lover	Alongside Simi Drey	
2021	Chief Daddy 2: Going for Broke	Dammy Baggio	Alongside Dakore Akande	
2022	Man of God	Pastor Zach		
2022	Different Strokes	Kamau	Alongside Monalisa Chinda, Jibola Dabo, Femi Faks	

=== TV shows ===
Year	Title	Role	Notes	Ref
2015	53 Extra	Presenter		
2016	Hush	Tes	alongside RMD	
2018	Rumor Has it	Franklin	Web series by Ndani TV	
2018	The Mr. X Family Show	John	Alongside Funlola Aofiyebi	
2018	Royal Castle			
2019	Flat 3B	Niyi		
2021	Mascara	Junior	Adeolu Adefarasin	

== Awards and nominations ==
Year	Award	Category	Result	Ref
2018	Best of Nollywood Awards	Best Kiss in a Movie	Won	
2021	Kalasha Awards	Best Lead Actor in a Film	Won	
