= Toluwanisimi =

Toluwani is a Yoruba given name from southwestern Nigeria. It means “I belong to God.”

== Person with the name ==
Toluwani Obayan is a Nigerian author, screenwriter, and director known for her contributions to the Nigerian film industry, Nollywood.
