= Iyebiye Adeitan =

Nigerian artist

- Education: BA in Theatre and Media Arts, Federal University Oye Ekiti
- Known for: Movie posters for Nigerian films (including Ayinla, Soólè, Ilé Owó, Obara'M)
- Style: Visual design Illustration; Movie poster design Brand identity UI/UX design |
- Awards: Nomin ated, Toronto International Nollywood Film Festival (TINFF) – Best Film Poster for Efunsetan Aniwura * Nominated, Empire Award * Nominated, Cannes Short Film Festival (2022)

Iyebiye Adeitan, also known as "Kaizen Kreativ", is a Nigerian creative visual designer and illustrator.

== Early life and education ==
Adeitan holds Bachelor of Arts in Theatre and Media Arts from Federal University Oye Ekiti.

== Career ==
Adeitan owns Kaizen studios does photography, illustration and Cinema poster projects. His first cinema project was "Funmi Wolder’s Efunsetan Aniwura" produced in January 2020, followed by an illustration poster "Ayinla" and worked with Micheal Omonua of the Surreal16 Collective, a short film. He worked with Kayode Kasum on Soole, then Ilé Owó and Obara M.

He is a story-driven designer who believes that digitization has changed the face of film poster designs in Nigeria. He does brand identity design, editorial design, product design UI/UX, and iconography. There are a lot of other types of designs, Iike music cover art for songs.

== Awards and recognition ==
- Nominated in the Toronto International Nollywood Film Festival (TINFF) in Toronto, Canada for his film poster "Efunsetan Aniwura".
- Nominated in Empire Award.
- Nominated in Cannes Short Film festival in France 2022.
- Member of Film Rats Club in 2018.

== See also ==
- Jade Osiberu
- Kayode Kasum
