= Prophetess (film) =

2021 Nigerian sports comedy film by Niyi Akinmolayan

- Directed by: Niyi Akinmolayan
- Written by: Niyi Akinmolayan; Victoria Akujobi
- Produced by: Victoria Akujobi; Mimi Bartels; Matilda Sola
- Starring: Toyin Abraham; Kehinde Bankole; Stan Nze; Uzor Arukwe; Deyemi Okanlawon; Seyi Awolowo; Lateef Adedimeji
- Cinematography: Barnabas Emordi
- Music by: Tolu Obanro
- Production companies: Anthill Productions; FilmOne
- Distributed by: FilmOne Entertainment
- Release date: 2 April 2021
- Running time: 142 minutes
- Country: Nigeria
- Languages: English; Yoruba
- Box office: ₦131.2 million

Prophetess is a 2021 Nigerian sports comedy film directed by Niyi Akinmolayan. The film stars Toyin Abraham, Kehinde Bankole, Uzor Arukwe, Stan Nze and Tina Mba in the lead roles. The film is based on a local prophetess who makes bold bogus predictions about the outcome of a local club football match, which goes beyond her control. The film had its theatrical release on 2 April 2021 and opened to positive reviews from critics. It also became a success at the box office.

== Plot ==
Ajoke, a prophetess in a small rural town, earns her living by making predictions in exchange for money. Her life takes a dramatic turn when she becomes an overnight sensation across Nigeria after accurately predicting Arsenal's victory in the UEFA Champions League and the winner of the Big Brother Naija reality show during an Instagram live session with Dipo, an on-air personality (OAP) and social media influencer.

Ajoke's newfound fame leads people to place great faith in her prophecies, with many making substantial bets on a local football club, Wonder Boyz, following her bold prediction that they would defeat league leaders, Gidi Boyz. This catches the attention of Eze-Ego, the owner of a popular betting company, Sure Banka. Determined to protect his business, Eze-Ego resorts to match-fixing in an attempt to ensure Wonder Boyz loses the game.

With her life now in danger, Ajoke turns to her sister, Labake, for help. At the same time, Labake is already grappling with the pressure of providing for their mother's medical needs, adding to the stakes in this tense and unpredictable situation.

== Cast ==
- Toyin Abraham as Ajoke Olooto
- Kehinde Bankole as Labake
- Stan Nze as Buntus
- Waliu Fagbemi as Akeem
- Deyemi Okanlawon as Fogo Bombastic
- Uzor Arukwe as Eze-Ego
- Adedimeji Lateef as Malaika
- Kunle Remi as Dipo
- Ronke Ojo as Iya Ibeji
- Tina Mba as Shalewa
- Seyi Awolowo
- Blessing Jessica Obasi as Deborah
- Emeka Nwagbaraocha as Thankgod
- Ibrahim Sunday as Club Owner

== Production and release ==
Prophetess is the second collaboration between Niyi Akinmolayan and Toyin Abraham after Elevator Baby. The film was predominantly shot in Ibadan. It was set in Layole village in Oyo State. The director of the film Niyi Akinmolayan revealed that the lead actress Toyin Abraham, who played the titular lead role as the prophetess, had once entered the spirit for nearly one hour during a rehearsal prior to a shooting sequence. It also delayed the rehearsal, and crew members were made to wait for over an hour. The film is also under the West African Film Fund with co-production partners Huahua, Empire Entertainment, and FilmOne.

== Reception ==
According to Sodas 'N' Popcorn, "the flaw with Prophetess is that much of the humour looks to be a product of the acting, and not the film. If the acting is great, the lines are far from it."

Jerry Chiemeke of Nigerian Entertainment Today said "Ultimately, Prophetess is a testament to Niyi Akinmolayan's ambition and his dedication to improving himself. It is not a perfect film – it is 30 minutes too long – but it is his best one yet, and it shows how far he has come since Kajola. It’s a comedy, but it's meaningful too, and unlike many of today's films, it succeeds in delivering a coherent final act." It was also rated 6.8/10.

=== Awards and nominations ===
Year	Award	Category	Recipient	Result	Ref
2022	Africa Magic Viewers' Choice Awards	Best Sound Editor	Bayo Adepetun And Biola 'Lala' Olayinka	Nominated	

== Box office ==
The film grossed over ₦43 million within just four days in the opening weekend despite the restricted seating capacity due to the COVID-19. The film grossed ₦108 million in the first four weeks after its release.

== See also ==
List of Nigerian films of 2021
