= Swanky JKA =

Nigerian actor (born 1991)

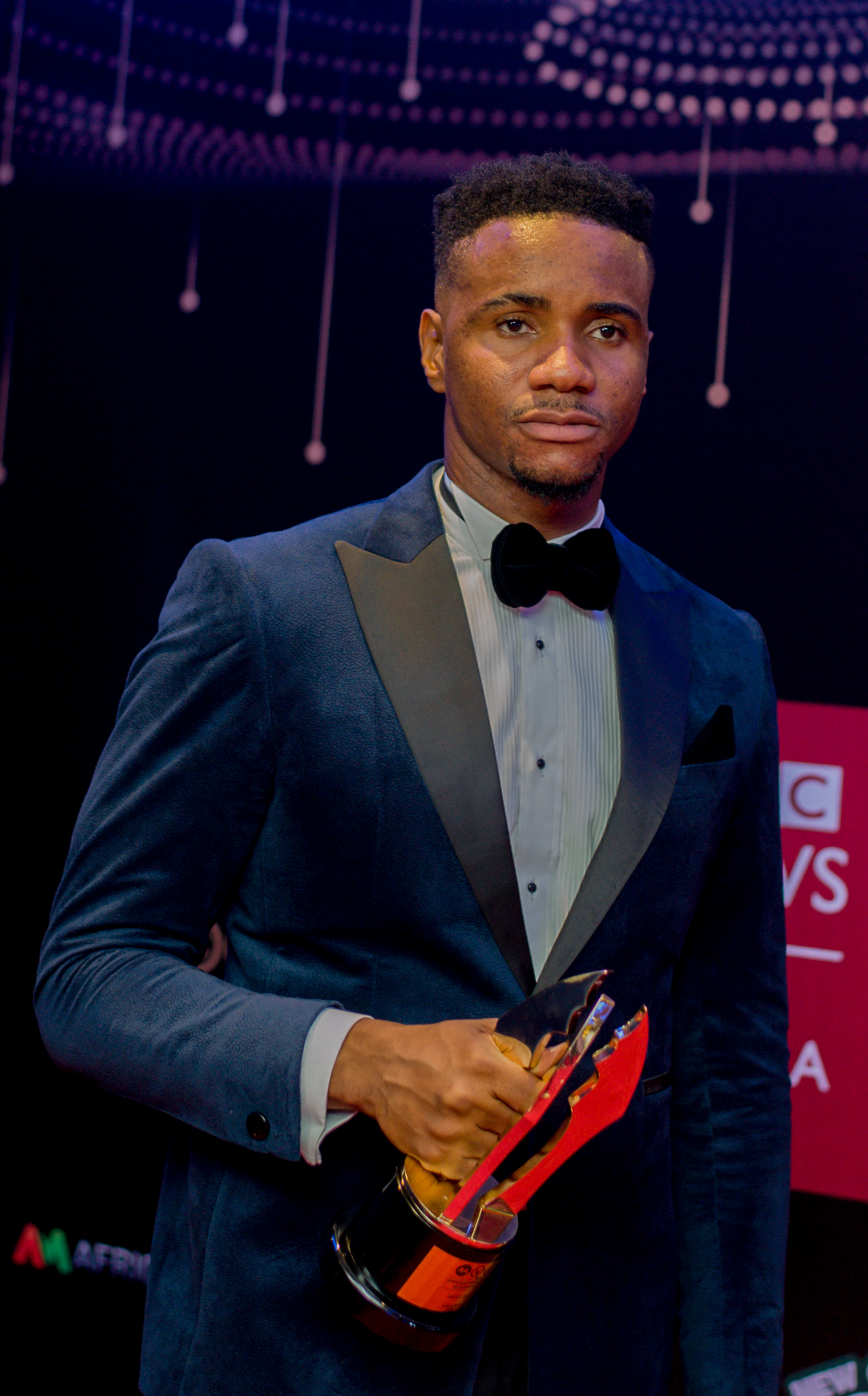
- Swanky JKA at AMVCA 2020
- Born: Jideofor Kenechukwu Achufusi; October 17, 1991 (age 34); Enugu, Nigeria
- Other name: Swanky JKA
- Citizenship: Nigeria
- Occupations: Actor; Model
- Years active: 2015–present
- Awards: Trailblazer award at the 2020 Africa Magic Viewers' Choice Awards.

Jideofor Kenechukwu Achufusi (born 17 October 1991) is a Nigerian actor and model, known professionally as Swanky JKA.

He is best known for his portrayal of Nnamdi Okeke in Living in Bondage: Breaking Free, as well as Chidi in Kambili: The Whole 30 Yards. He won the Trailblazer award at the 2020 Africa Magic Viewers' Choice Awards (AMVCA).

== Career ==
Originally a model, Achufusi began his acting career by playing supporting roles in Nollywood films Poka Messiah, Black Rose, Pretty Little Thing, Ofu Obi and A Lonely Lane. He gained wider recognition in 2019 for portraying Nnamdi Okeke in Living in Bondage: Breaking Free, which earned him a nomination for Best Actor and a Trailblazer award at the 2020 Africa Magic Viewers' Choice Awards.

== Filmography ==
| Year | Title | Role | Notes |
|---|---|---|---|
| 2014 | Burning Bridges | Manny | Alongside Ken Erics, Ivie Okujaye |
| 2015 | Lost Pride | Juice | Alongside Tana Adelana, Eucharia Anunobi |
| 2015 | Lost Pride | Juice | Drama |
| 2016 | Poka Messiah | Xavier | Alongside Jude Thomas Dawam, Yul Edochie |
| 2017 | Pretty Little Thing | Michael | Alongside Jide Kosoko, Ngozi Ezeonu |
| 2017 | A Lonely Lane | Kelly | Alongside Uju Anikwe, Juliet Ekeson |
| 2018 | Black Rose | Nelo | Alongside Blossom Chukwujekwu |
| 2018 | Crazy, Lovely, Cool | Neo | Romance |
| 2018 | Big Mess | | Comedy |
| 2018 | Lionheart | Reporter | Alongside Genevieve Nnaji, Nkem Owoh, Pete Edochie |
| 2019 | Ofuobi | Jide | Alongside Victoria Dijey, Chioma Idigo |
| 2019 | Living in Bondage: Breaking Free | Nnamdi Okeke | |
| 2020 | Kambili: The Whole 30 Yards | Chidi | Alongside Mawuli Gavour, Nancy Isime |
| 2020 | A Bride with the Gun | Pope | Alongside Avira Akpobi, Ifeanyi Anike |
| 2021 | Dwindle | Chinedu | Alongside Broda Shaggi |
| 2021 | Lockdown | Sam | Alongside Omini Aho, Chioma Chukwuka |
| 2021 | Bad Boys & Bridesmaid | Olisa | Alongside Rosemary Abazie, Ademola Adedoyin |
| 2021 | Dice | Yomi Taiwo | Alongside Imoudu Ayonote, Femi Branch |
| 2021 | Ejiro's Lust | Bobby | Alongside Tana Adelana, Abayomi Alvin |
| 2021 | Dear Sister | Jide | Alongside Eucharia Anunobi Ekwu, Jude Thomas Dawam |
| 2022 | Brotherhood | Simon | Alongside Mercy Aigbe, Adebowale Adetayo |
| 2022 | Money Miss Road | Joe | Action / comedy |
| 2022 | I am Nazzy | | Comedy / romance |
| 2022 | Luckily Unfortunate | | Alongside Uzor Arukwe, Emmanuel Blaq |
| 2022 | My Oyibo Queen | | |
| 2022 | Ije Awele | Dubem / Dubar | Alongside Victoria Nwogu, Onyeka Onwenu |
| 2023 | A Tribe Called Judah | Emeka Judah | Alongside Funke Akindele |
| 2023 | Blood Vessel | Boma | Adventure / drama / thriller |
| 2023 | Ifediche | | Chiwetalu Agu, Pete Edochie |
| 2023 | Bleeding Butterfly | Jide | Directed by Ernest Obi |
| 2023 | Special Assistant | Joel | Alongside Kameel Audu, Aderinoye Babatunde |
| 2023 | Flip Side | Chike | Ifeanyi Anike, Chinenye Chukwu |
| 2024 | Japa | Mezu | Lead alongside Adesua Etomi |
| 2024 | I Love You Regardless | | Alongside Lateef Adedimeji, Francis Atela |
| 2024 | Break of Dawn | | Directed by Umanu Elijah |
| 2026 | Aba Blues | | |

== Awards ==
| Year | Award | Category | Film | Result | Ref |
|---|---|---|---|---|---|
| 2018 | Best of Nollywood Awards | Best Actor in a Leading Role (Igbo) | A Lonely Lane | Won | |
| 2018 | Best of Nollywood Awards | Best Actor in a Leading Role (Igbo) | Ofu Obi | Nominated | |
| 2020 | Africa Magic Viewers' Choice Awards | Best Actor | Living in Bondage: Breaking Free | Nominated | |
| 2020 | Africa Magic Viewers' Choice Awards | Trailblazer Award | | Won | |
| 2020 | Best of Nollywood Awards | Best Actor in a Leading Role (English) | Living in Bondage: Breaking Free | Won | |
| 2020 | Best of Nollywood Awards | Revelation of the Year (Male) | | Won | |
| 2020 | Best of Nollywood Awards | Best Actor in a Lead role (Igbo) | Nne | Nominated | |
| 2020 | Best of Nollywood Awards | Best Kiss in a Movie | Living in Bondage: Breaking Free | Nominated | |
| 2021 | Net Honours | Most Popular Actor | | Won | |

== Personal life ==
Achufusi married his partner, Ifeoma, in a private wedding ceremony in Milan, Italy, on 11 April 2026.
