= LOUD =

2020 Nigerian musical film

- Theatrical poster
- Directed by: Umanu Elijah
- Produced by: Honesty Bawa (exec.); Lemuel Bawa
- Starring: Eucharia Anunobi; Wale Ojo; Bolanle Ninalowo; Jide Kosoko; Timini Egbuson; Sophie Alakija; Abayomi Alvin; Craze Clown
- Production companies: Ebawa production Krystal Filmworks
- Distributed by: Silverbird Film Distribution
- Release date: 20 November 2020
- Running time: 95 minutes
- Country: Nigeria
- Language: English
- Budget: $300,000

LOUD an abbreviation for Living Out Ur Dreams, is a 2020 Nigerian high school musical television film directed by Umanu Elijah, and produced by Lemuel Bawa and Honesty Bawa as executive producer. LOUD, is known as the first Nigerian high school musical film, screenplay written by Ariko Fuludu Onome and Bester Waribo.

"Living Out Ur Dreams was inspired by the desire to reassure teenagers that their dreams were valid," says the producers. In Kemi Filani's review, Ella Chioma said LOUD was shot with Hollywood standard cinematic equipment, and boosts of quality photos.

== Cast ==
- Eucharia Anunobi
- Wale Ojo
- Bolanle Ninalowo
- Jide Kosoko
- Timini Egbuson
- Sophie Alakija
- Abayomi Alvin
- Craze Clown
- Sydney Talker
- Z fanzy TV
- Chuddy K
- Eddy Oboh
- Ebube Obi
- Tersy Akpata
- Koko Ashley

== See also ==
- List of Nigerian films of 2020
