= Something Like Gold =

2023 Nigeria drama film

- Theatrical release poster
- Directed by: Kayode Kasum
- Written by: Adaeze Ibechukwu; Toluwani Obayan Osibe
- Story by: Toluwani Obayan; Adaeze Ibechukwu; Kayode Kasum; Sandra Okunzuwa
- Produced by: Sandra Okunzuwa; Ife Olujuyigbe
- Starring: Sandra Okunzuwa; Mercy Johnson; Timini Egbuson; Kunle Remi
- Edited by: Alex Aladejebi
- Production companies: Film Trybe; Greenwealth Production
- Distributed by: FilmOne Distributions; Netflix
- Release date: 29 September 2023
- Running time: 106 minutes
- Country: Nigeria
- Languages: English,Yoruba
- Box office: ₦60M

Something Like Gold is a 2023 Nigerian drama film written by Adaeze Ibechukwu and directed by Kayode Kasum. The film centers on a woman who rediscovers love after being left at the altar while confronting the challenges of rebuilding her life following the seizure of her father's wealth. Produced by Sandra Okunzuwa and Ife Olujuyigbe, the film was released in cinemas nationwide on 29 September 2023, and stars Sandra Okunzuwa, Mercy Johnson Okojie, and Timini Egbuson.

== Plot ==
Tamara Jola-Scott the pampered daughter of wealthy Lagos socialite Jolayemi Scott, lives a life of privilege, Her world is turned upside down when news breaks of her father's involvement in an embezzlement scheme, leading to his impending arrest. The scandal abruptly halts her wedding preparations, as all their properties are seized and her wedding is canceled. Her fiancé's father, who is also her father's business partner, refuses to proceed with the union, accusing Jolayemi of theft. Consequently, her fiancé, Demola abandons her.

Left alone and shunned by friends and family, Tamara is devastated and unsure of her next steps. Unexpectedly, Aunty Mayowa, their former housemaid, comes to her rescue, following her father's instructions. She takes Tamara into her modest home, a stark contrast to the opulence she once knew. As Tamara adjusts to her new reality, she uncovers hidden secrets and meets people who profoundly change her life.

== Cast ==
- Sandra Okunzuwa as Tamara Jolayemi Scott
- Mercy Johnson Okojie as Aunty Mayowa
- Kunle Remi as Tunde
- Timini Egbuson as Demola
- Tope Olowoniyan as Ify
- Bukky Ogunnote as Aunty Solape
- Broda Shaggi as Area Boy
- Patrick Doyle as Jolayemi Scott
- Olayemi Soyeju as Aunty Bolu
- Bella Salami as Bimpe
- Teniola Aladese as Yemisi
- Segun Arinze as Demola's Father
- Waliu Fagbemi as Habeeb
- Runo Efe as Tega

== Production ==
The film was produced by FilmOne Entertainment and shot on location in Lagos, Nigeria.

== Release ==
The film premiered in Nigerian cinemas on 29 September 2023 and later became available on streaming platforms, expanding its reach to international audiences.

== Reception ==
=== Box-office performance ===
Something Like Gold performed well at the box office, grossing ₦11.75 million in Nigeria within the first three days of its release and accumulating over ₦18.75 million in its first week. The film quickly gained popularity not only in Nigeria but also in other African countries and among the diaspora.
