= Dwindle (film) =

2021 Nigerian comedy film

- Directed by: Kayode Kasum; Dare Olaitan
- Produced by: Mimi Bartels
- Starring: Funke Akindele; Bisola Aiyeola; Jidekene Achufusi; Gregory Ojefua; Broda Shaggi; Adedimeji Lateef; Timini Egbuson; Efa Iwara; Uzor Arukwe; Steve Chuks; Demi Banwo
- Release date: 16 June 2021
- Running time: 108 minutes
- Country: Nigeria
- Language: English

Dwindle is a 2021 Nigerian comedy film written by Darlington Abuda and directed by Kayode Kasum and Dare Olaitan. It was produced by Mimi Bartels for FilmOne Productions.

== Plot ==
It tells the story of Sogo and Buta, two friends who hijack a car and venture into cabbing, and how their lives take a drastic turn when they run into assassins who have just kidnapped the state governor.

== Cast ==
- Funke Akindele as Officer Tolani
- Bisola Aiyeola as Officer Juliet
- Jidekene Achufusi as Chinedu
- Lateef Adedimeji as Fuku
- Harriet Akinola as Todun's Mother
- Jude Chukwuka as Todun's Father
- Mary Chukwuma as Female Saint
- Jibola Dabo as Governor Otunta
- Martha Ehinome as Ajoke Kasum
- Oli Ekun as Chemistry
- Temisan Emmanuel as Tobi Williams
- Rotimi Fakunle as Officer Michael
- Ikponmwosa Gold as Officer Abani
- Efa Iwara as Collins
- David 'Mr Nollywood' Patrick as Bodyguard
- Maxwell Nwoye as Bodyguard
- Feyifunmi Oginni as Uber Driver
- Feyisayo Ogundipe as Newscaster
- Immaculata Oko as Kayin Damola
- Tope Olowoniyan as Todun
- Jide 'JBlaze' Oyegbile as Ikenna
- Gregory Ojefua as Oga Landlord
- Broda Shaggi as Buta
- Adedimeji Lateef as Fuku
- Timini Egbuson as Josiah Otunba
- Steve Chuks as Jide
- Demi Banwo as Ogogoro
- Efa Iwara as Collins
- Uzor Arukwe as Male Saint.

== Release ==
It was released theatrically on 16 July 2021.

== Awards and nominations ==
Year	Award	Category	Recipient	Result	Ref
2022	Africa Magic Viewers' Choice Awards	Best Actress in A Comedy	Bisola Aiyeola	Nominated	
2022	Africa Magic Viewers' Choice Awards	Best Actor in A Comedy	Broda Shaggi	Won	
