= Voiceless (2020 film) =

Hausa, Nigerian film

- Directed by: Robert O. Peters
- Written by: Jennifer Agunloye
- Produced by: Rogers Ofime
- Starring: Uzee Usman; Yakubu Mohammed; Abba Ali Zaky; Sani Mu'azu; Abubakar Maina; Nadia; Dutch Mary Anawo
- Release date: 18 November 2020
- Country: Nigeria
- Language: Hausa

Voiceless is a 2020 Hausa Nigerian thriller film written by Jennifer Agunloye, directed by Robert O. Peters, and produced by Rogers Ofime. The film stars Uzee Usman, Yakubu Mohammed, Asabe Madaki, Sanni Ma'azu, Adam Garba. The film is about a bright and promising girl who was held captive alongside 245 other schoolmates. During her stay at the terrorist camp, she crossed path with her soulmate. The film premiered in cinemas on 18 November 2020.

== Synopsis ==
The movie tells the story of Salma and Goni who were kidnapped by a terrorist gang. Goni was kidnapped with his friends to work for the terrorist gang as a skilled mechanic. Salma was kidnapped along with her schoolmates by the gang to satisfy their sexual urge and end the girl's education. Salma and Goni fall in love in the camp, which gave them strength to survive and escape. Goni and his friend Bulus helped the girls escape from the camp, but they came back home to hostility. Salma came back with a baby that her father wasn't happy with. This situation drove Salma away from home.

== Cast ==
- Asabe Madaki as Salma
- Uzee Usman as Banza
- Yakubu Mohammed as Lafiya
- Abba Ali Zaky as Bulus
- Sani Mu'azu as Salma's Father
- Adam Garba as Goni
- Rosemary Sunday as Goni's Mum
- Habiba Zock-Sock as Kauna
- Mary Anawo as Proprietor
- Nadia Dutch as Dalia
- Abubakar Maina as Lamido

== Awards and nominations ==
The film received fifteen (15) nominations at the Universal Movie Award.

Year	Award	Category	Recipient	Result	Ref
2021	Universal Movie Awards	Best Picture	Voiceless	Won	
2021	Universal Movie Awards	Best Producer	Robert O. Peters - Voiceless	Won	
2021	Universal Movie Awards	Best Screen play	Jennifer Agunloye - Voiceless	Won	
2021	Universal Movie Awards	Best Film Edit	Voiceless	Won	
2021	Universal Movie Awards	Best Actor male	Adam Garba - Voiceless	Nominated	
2021	Universal Movie Awards	Best Actor Female	Asabe Madaki	Nominated	
2021	Universal Movie Awards	Best Supporting Actor Male	Sanni Mu'azu - Voiceless	Nominated	
2021	Universal Movie Awards	Best Supporting Actor Female	Rekkiya Atta - Voiceless	Nominated	
2021	Universal Movie Awards	Best cinematography	Jonathan Kovel - Voiceless	Nominated	
2021	Universal Movie Awards	Best Cast Director	Voiceless	Nominated	
2021	Universal Movie Awards	Best Story	Voiceless	Nominated	
2021	Universal Movie Awards	Best Sound	Voiceless	Nominated	
2021	Universal Movie Awards	Best Production Design	Voiceless	Nominated	
2021	Universal Movie Awards	Best Original Score	Voiceless	Nominated	
2021	Universal Movie Awards	Best Visual Effects	Voiceless	Nominated	
2022	Africa Magic Viewers' Choice Awards	Best Indigenous Language Movie or TV Series - Hausa	Voiceless	Won	

== Reception ==
Aminu Abdulahi Ibrahim said what is fascinating about the movie Voiceless is the way it illustrated how Boko Haram abduct and lure young people into terrorism. It displayed how people take laws into their hands and kill whoever escapes a terrorist gang. He also said, "I do not solicit an amnesty for every escaped and surrendered member but what was exhibited in the movie will surely make people think about their solution. There is amnesty no matter how war is but the government has to be very vigilant to avoid granting remission to the people that will later rearm themselves and murder innocents live."

According to Pulse.ng, "At the heart of Voiceless is a sincere attempt to address all the imaginable vices of insurgency. Sadly, this task understandably becomes too herculean for it to bear. Signing up for Jack's master of all trades class earned it its first and most prominent miss."

== See also ==
List of Nigerian films of 2020
