= Ponzi (film) =

2021 Nigerian comedy film

- Theatre poster
- Directed by: Kayode Kasum
- Screenplay by: Toluwani Obayan
- Produced by: Vincent Okonkwo
- Starring: Timini Egbuson; Broda Shaggi; Uzoamaka Aniunoh; Jide Kosoko; Mawuli Gavor; Tope Tedela; Mr Macaroni
- Narrated by: Uzoamaka Aniunoh
- Production company: VSL Media
- Release date: 12 March 2021
- Running time: 108 minutes
- Country: Nigeria
- Language: English

Ponzi is a 2021 Nigerian comedy film based on the victims of the 2016 MMM Ponzi scheme. It was written by Toluwani Obayan, produced by Vincent Okonkwo and directed by Kayode Kasum. It stars Jide Kosoko, Chinyere Wilfred, Timini Egbuson, Tope Tedela, Broda Shaggi and Mr Macaroni. It was released theatrically on 12 March 2021.

== Plot ==
Abeke the omniscient narrator introduces the residents of a close. Chief Olaoba is a wealthy politician who neglects the needs of the community he represents. He however shows up occasionally to distribute money to his constituents. Bob returns from the diaspora and gains the trust of the occupants of the close and convinces them to invest in a get-rich-quick scheme named Richvest. This leads to a series of unexpected events.

== Cast ==
- Jide Kosoko as Olaoba, Abeke's father
- Chinyere Wilfred as Mrs. Olaoba, Abeke's mother
- Mawuli Gavor as Rob, a returnee
- Timini Egbuson as Ikenna, a layabout who squats with his elder brother Uchenna.
- Mr Macaroni as Uchenna, a lesson teacher
- Immaculate Oko-Kasum as Zara, Uchenna's heavily pregnant wife
- Tope Tedela as Tafa, Zara's brother, a kebab seller who hopes to make it as a chef
- Broda Shaggi as Chudi, a struggling upcoming musician
- Amanda Dara as Oluchi
- Uzoamaka Aniunoh as Abeke
- Zubby Michael as Charles, a neighbourhood hustler and loan shark
- Eso Dike as Ikenna
- Caroline Igben as Nike
- Namisi Govin Emma as Uche

== Production and release ==
The movie is based on the experiences of Nigerians during the 2016 MMM online scheme which promised 30% returns on investment. The scheme inadvertently crashed and put subscribers in distress. In an interview, the movie’s producer, said the project was aimed at sensitising Nigerians to avoid get-rich-quick schemes. It was shot in Lagos but set in Ota, Ogun State.

The movie voice technique was employed as Uzo Aniunoh was both an actress and a narrator. This technique has been used in movies like Fight Club and Memento.

== Reception ==
In a review for Nigerian Entertainment Today, Jerry Chiemeke wrote "The only way for the audience to enjoy this film is to close their eyes to its technical flaws – and they are many. They will probably laugh (a lot), but in the end, a good film transcends giggles, and when it comes down to categorising Nollywood films, this will not be one of the exactly memorable ones." He rated the film a 6/10.

=== Awards and nominations ===
Year	Award	Category	Recipient	Result	Ref
2022	Africa Magic Viewers' Choice Awards	Best Actor in A Comedy	Timini Egbuson	Pending	
