= Bitter Rain =

- Directed by: Toka McBaror
- Written by: Hannah Nwasor
- Produced by: Hannah Nwasor; Darlington Abuda; Executive Producer: Henry Okpobe; Hannah Nwasor
- Starring: Stan Nze; Ayo Makun; Zubby Michael; Alexx Ekubo; Mike Ezuruonye; Erica Nlewedim; Efe Irele
- Cinematography: Oke Abiola
- Edited by: Umanu Elijah; Miracle Nduka; Kayode Aransiola; George Hephzibah (VFX Editor)
- Production company: WonderKind Media Ltd
- Distributed by: FilmOne Distributions; Amazon MGM Studios
- Release date: 13 August 2021
- Running time: 113 minutes
- Country: Nigeria
- Languages: English; Igbo

Bitter Rain is a 2021 Nigerian adventure and drama film directed by Toka McBaror and produced by Hannah Nwasor and Darlington Abuda. The film stars Stan Nze, Ayo Makun Zubby Michael, Mike Ezuruonye, Alexx Ekubo, Erica Nlewedim and Efe Irele in pivotal roles and explores themes of family, love, betrayal, and the consequences of holding onto past grievances.

Bitter Rain was released by Amazon MGM Studios through Prime Video on August 13, 2021.

== Synopsis ==
Set in a rural Nigerian community, the film tells the story of a group of individuals from the city; a journalist seeking to find the truth and an adventure-seeker who converge on a mystical celebration in the town of Ahaba, leading to a rollercoaster of events that will leave viewers glued to their seats.

== Cast ==
- Mike Ezuruonye as Nnamdi
- Stan Nze as Ebuka
- Alexx Ekubo as TY
- Efe Irele as Fiona
- Erica Nlewedim as Idara
- Ayo Makun as Alexander
- Hannah Nwasor as Zita
- Zuby Michael as Nathan
- Patrick Onyeocha as Joseph Ford
- George Nanakwesi Chux as Buchi

== Production ==
Bitter Rain was produced by WonderKind Media Ltd and AP Studios and filmed on location in rural Nigeria. The film was directed by Toka McBaror, known for his work on various Nigerian television dramas and films. The production aimed to highlight the beauty and struggles of rural life in Nigeria while addressing universal themes of family, love, and loss. The cinematography, led by Oke Abiola, captures the rich landscapes and the intimate settings that serve as a backdrop for the intense emotional drama.

== Release and distribution ==
Bitter Rain premiered at the Filmhouse Cinemas Landmark Event Centre in Lagos on August 9 2021, and was theatrically released across Nigeria on 13 August 2021, by Filmone Distribution.
