= Omoye =

2017 Nigerian movie

- Directed by: Uche Chukwu
- Written by: Uche Chukwu
- Produced by: Rotimi Salami
- Starring: Kiki Omeili, Tina Mba, Stan Nze, Rotimi Salami
- Release dates: 22 October 2017 (Ajegunle, Lagos, Nigeria)
- Countries: Ajegunle, Lagos State Nigeria
- Language: Yoruba

Omoye is a 2017 Nigerian movie written and directed by Uche Chukwu. It was produced by Africa Magic Viewers Award Winner, Rotimi Salami with sponsorship from Natures Gentle Touch. Omoye's plot tackled one of the problems in the society; domestic violence and the movie is endorsed by the Lagos State Domestic and Sexual Violence Response Team (DSVRT). Also, the movie stars Kiki Omeili, Tina Mba, Stan Nze, Rotimi Salami

== Synopsis ==
The movie tells the story of a highly determined young lady who fell into the hands of an abuser as a husband. As the abuse continues, she becomes mentally and physically sapped but still does not give up on her marriage.

== Premiere ==
The movie premiere was held on Sunday, October 22, 2017, at the Genesis Deluxe Cinema, Palms Shopping Mall, Lekki, Lagos.

== Location ==
The movie was shot in Ajegunle, Lagos State, Nigeria.

== Cast ==
- Kiki Omeili as Omoye
- Rotimi Salami as Femi
- Stan Nze as Peter
- Greg Ojefua as Reverend Father
- Tina Mba as Aunty Chioma
- Olarotimi Fakunle as Baba Super
- Omobola Akinde as Mrs. Johnson
- Goodness Usman
- Mariana Dike as Gladys
- Kelvinmary Ndukwe
- Onyendika Ibeji
- Evans Odiagbe.
