= A Place Called Happy =

Nollywood movie

- Directed by: D. A. Lowladee
- Starring: Blossom Chukwujekwu; Sika Osei; Kiki Omeili; Mawuli Gavor; Deyemi Okanlawon; Omowunmi Dada
- Release date: 2015
- Running time: 60 minutes
- Countries: Nigeria; Ghana
- Language: English

A Place Called Happy is a Nollywood movie produced, directed and written by Dolapo Adeleke. It tells a story of two couples from Ghana and Nigeria that have had some challenging times in the past years.

== Cast ==
- Sika Osei as Abena
- Kiki Omeili
- Mawuli Gavor as Kwame
- Blossom Chukwujekwu as Dimeji
- Omowunmi Dada
- Deyemi Okanlawon
