= Day of Destiny =

2021 Nigerian film directed by Akay Mason and Abosi Ogba

- Directed by: Akay Mason; Abosi Ogba
- Written by: Akay Mason; Abosi Ogba
- Produced by: Akujobi Victoria and Isioma Osaje
- Starring: Olumide Oworu; Denola Grey; Norbert Young; Toyin Abraham
- Cinematography: Barnabas Emordi
- Edited by: Victoria Akujobi
- Music by: Gray Jones
- Production companies: Anthill Productions Inkblot Productions and Anakle Films
- Release date: 1 January 2021
- Country: Nigeria
- Language: English
- Box office: ₦18.6 million

Day of Destiny also known as D.O.D is a 2021 Nigerian sci-fi adventure film written and co-directed by Akay Mason and Abosi Ogba. Abosi Ogba made his directorial debut in this film. The film stars Olumide Oworu, Denola Grey, Norbert Young and Toyin Abraham in the lead roles. The film is based on the mysterious adventures of two teenage brothers who travel back in time by 20 years to change the fortunes of the family. It is also the first Nigerian family adventure film as well as Nigeria's first-ever time traveller film and was also the first Nigerian film to be released in 2021.

== Cast ==
- Olumide Oworu as Chidi
- Denola Grey as Rotimi
- Norbert Young as Bankole
- Toyin Abraham as Captain
- Jide Kosoko as Chief Adediran
- Blossom Chukwujekwu as Young Bankole
- Ini Dima-Okojie as Young Ifeoma
- Ireti Doyle as Ifeoma
- Broda Shaggi as Babayaro
- Tega Akpobome as Young Babayaro
- Gbemi Akinlade as Helena
- Deyemi Okanlawon as Governor Coker
- Anne Annex as Iya Monday
- Chris Akwarandu as Professor Mujeed
- Jumoke Ogunleye as General's Wife
- Mavis Ofudu as Conductor

== Release ==
The film was initially supposed to have its theatrical release on 30 October 2020 but was postponed to 1 January 2021 due to End SARS protests. The film had its theatrical release on 1 January 2021 coinciding with the New Year and opened to positive reviews from critics while also became a box office success. It was released on Netflix on 13 July 2021.

== Awards and nominations ==
Year	Award	Category	Recipient	Result	Ref
2022	Africa Magic Viewers' Choice Awards	Best Art Director	Chris Udomi	Nominated	
