= Taiwo Ogunnimo =

Nigerian actress and producer

- Born: August 1, 1995 (age 31); Lagos
- Education: Babcock University University of Lagos Coventry University
- Occupations: Filmmaker; Producer; Director; Lecturer; Public Relations Personnel
- Known for: I Am The Prostitute Mama Described. How are you?

Taiwo Ogunnimo is a Nigerian Nollywood producer, public relations personnel and a university lecturer. In 2022, she won the 2022 AMVCA short film category award with her I Am The Prostitute Mama Described short film beating the other six contestants. She studied English in Babcock University and then a MSc in Literature from the University of Lagos. She further went to the United Kingdom for a second masters in Coventry University where she graduated with a distinction in Communications, culture and media.
