= Áfàméfùnà: An Nwa Boi Story =

- Promotional poster
- Directed by: Kayode Kasum
- Written by: Anyanwu Adaora
- Produced by: Olawumi Fajemirokun: Kenechukwu Egbue
- Starring: Stan Nze; Kanayo O. Kanayo; Alexx Ekubo; Segun Arinze
- Release date: 1 December 2023
- Country: Nigeria
- Language: Igbo language

Áfàméfùnà: An Nwa Boi Story is a 2023 Nigerian film written by Adaora Sandra Anyanwu and directed by Kayode Kasum. It predominantly tells the story of the Igbo apprenticeship system in Nigeria. The film, which was produced by Olawumi Fajemirokun and Kene Egbue, is the first ever feature-length film on the Igbo apprenticeship system in Nigeria and was also largely filmed in Igbo language. The cast includes Kanayo O. Kanayo, Stan Nze, Alexx Ekubo, Atlanta Bridget Johnson, and Segun Arinze.

Afamefuna made its debut on Netflix on 29 March 2024 and was the number one Nigerian movie on the platform for more than 3 weeks.

== Synopsis ==
Áfàméfùnà: An Nwa Boi Story tells the story of the Igbo apprenticeship system in Nigeria.

The film's opening sequence captivates viewers with its breathtaking depiction of Igbo cultural history, introducing them to millionaire business mogul Afamefuna, who hosts a spectacular remembrance ceremony for his late father.

The film revolves around Áfàméfùnà, who was brought in for questioning following the death of his friend Paulo. There is then a flashback to the complex history of both friends, where they were both navigating the world of Igbo apprenticeship in Nigeria under Odogwu. Things were going smooth between the friends until Odogwu decided to settle Áfàméfùnà (junior apprentice) before Paulo (senior apprentice).

== Cast ==
- Stan Nze as Áfàméfùnà
- Kanayo O. Kanayo as Odogwu
- Alexx Ekubo as Paul
- Atlanta Bridget Johnson as Amaka
- Segun Arinze as CSP Gidado
- Paul Nnadiekwe as Young Afam
- Dan Ugwu
- Karl Smith
- Ezeh Peter
- Chisom Oguike
- Moc Madu
- Chuks Joseph
- Noble Igwe
- Eso Dike
- Omobola Akinde
- Jide Kene Achufusi

== Production and release ==
Áfàméfùnà: An Nwa Boi Story was released to the Nigerian cinemas on 1 December 2023. Before its release to the cinemas, it was shown at the 2023 Africa International Film Festival (AFRIFF) and the audience expressed excitement at the movie. The film was released to Netflix on 29 March 2024.

== Awards and nominations ==
Year	Award	Category	Recipient	Result	Ref
2024	Africa Magic Viewers' Choice Awards	Best Supporting Actor	Alexx Ekubo	Pending	
2024	Africa Magic Viewers' Choice Awards	Best Lead Actor	Stan Nze	Pending	
2024	Africa Magic Viewers' Choice Awards	Best Writing	Anyanwu Sandra Adaora	Pending	
2024	Africa Magic Viewers' Choice Awards	Best Director	Kayode Kasum	Pending	
