= Sobe Charles Umeh =

- Born: Umeh Charles Sobechukwu; Enugu, Enugu State, Nigeria
- Occupations: Movie Director, Producer,Editor
- Years active: 2015 – present

Umeh Charles Sobechukwu,// professionally credited as Sobe Charles Umeh// is a Nigerian-Canadian film and TV director and producer, best known for the films Sorelle, Black Vision and Bad Drop, as well as the 2017 Africa Magic Viewers Choice (AMVCA) winning movie Amonye Bu Onye.

== Early life ==
Sobe was born in Enugu, Southeast Nigeria, He is the last of six children.

== Personal life ==
In 2014, Umeh married Isioma Concilia, with whom he subsequently moved to Regina, Saskatchewan, Canada.

== Career ==
Sobe started his filmmaking journey in 2015 when he co-produced his first feature-length film Bad Drop with Actor Producer Stan Nze, which also served as his feature length Directorial Debut. The film went ahead to win 2 awards and many nominations.

== Filmography ==
Year	Title	Notes	Role	Type
2015	Bad Drop	Won Best Film In Comedy at the Abuja International Film Festival (AIFF) 2015, actor Kalu Ikeagu also won Best Supporting Actor at the 2015 Best of Nollywood Awards for his role in this Movie	Director/Producer	Feature Film
2015	On The Brink	Special Jury Award Best Feature Film (Nollywood) Toronto International Nollywood Film Festival (TINFF) 2017	Director	Feature Film
2016	How Not To Fall In Love		Executive Producer, Producer and director	Feature Film
2016	Gone Grey		Executive Producer and director	Feature Film
2016	Amonye Bu Onye	Best Indigenous Movie: African Movies Viewers Choice Awards (AMVCA)2017	Director	Feature Film
2017	Surrogate	Featuring Owolabi Adebayo, Chris Akwarandu, Esther Asije	Director	Feature Film
2017	At Your Service	Featuring Monalisa Chinda, Alexx Ekubo, Francisca Eleyele	Director	Feature Film
2017	5th Floor	Featuring Olive Daniels Amah, Kemen Ekerette	Director	Feature Film
2017	The Patient	Featuring Ini Edo and Seun Akindele	Director	Feature Film
2017	Love and Cancer	Featuring Chris Attoh, Olakunle Fawole, Ayo Adesanya Hassan	Director	Feature Film
