= Kambili: The Whole 30 Yards =

2020 Nigerian romantic comedy film directed by Kayode Kasum

- Directed by: Kayode Kasum
- Written by: Ozioma Ogbaji
- Starring: Nancy Isime; Jide Kene Achufusi; Mawuli Gavor; Sharon Ooja; Venita Akpofure; Koye Kekere-Ekun; Uzor Arukwe; Elvina Ibru; Toyin Abraham
- Production companies: FilmOne Entertainment; Empire Entertainment; Huahua Media
- Release date: 4 December 2020
- Running time: 120 minutes
- Countries: Nigeria; South Africa; China
- Language: English
- Box office: ₦20 million

Kambili: The Whole 30 Yards—also simply known as Kambili—is a 2020 Nigerian romantic comedy film written by Ozioma Ogbaji and directed by Kayode Kasum. It stars Nancy Isime and Jide Kene Achufusi in lead roles, and follows a young woman on her self-discovery journey after her quest to marry before she turns 30 fails. The theatrical release was on 4 December 2020, and opened to mixed reviews from critics.

== Plot ==
Kambili Maduka, a disorganised shopaholic, is suspended from her office job due to repeated lateness. Her troubles worsen when John, her boyfriend of two years, unceremoniously breaks up with her before her 29th birthday, stating she is unsuitable wife material. The news disheartens Kambili as she had hoped to marry before she turned 30, and falls into a deep depression. On a night out with her friends to celebrate her birthday, a downcast Kambili announces her plans to win John back by proving her maturity but discovers the landlord has ejected her due to outstanding rent when she returns to her apartment.

After spending the night at her free-spirited mother Cynthia's house, Kambili stubbornly leaves for best friend Chidi's apartment, to his girlfriend Linda's chagrin. Upon reflection and firmly determined, Kambili holds a jumble sale and uses the takings to open an art gallery, with her supportive friends Chidi, Biodun and Jesse collaborating to transform her goal into success. It is during this period that she reluctantly moves back in with Cynthia after Linda demands Kambili leave Chidi's house and gradually warms to Cynthia's toyboy fiancé Bankole, who offers valuable business advice.

John attends the gallery's launch and is impressed with Kambili's progress since their breakup. He asks her out for a drink, and despite having made plans with her friends who had supported her through the past months, she accepts his offer. The couple rekindle their relationship, and after Kambili drops several hints, John reluctantly proposes, but her friends refuse to share in her joy, accusing her of regularly taking them for granted and not showing support when Biodun and Jesse's relationship hit a rough patch. Meanwhile, Linda clashes with Chidi after it dawns on her that Kambili will always remain a priority in Chidi's life, leading to the couple's split.

Kambili returns to work, where she impresses her boss Jessica with her punctuality. However, her position is subsequently terminated as the gallery takes up most of her time, but not before Jessica commends her newly discovered maturity and development, and Kambili decides to focus solely on her business. She also realises she will never meet John's impossibly high standards, and after breaking off their engagement, she reconciles with her friends, including Chidi with whom she finally begins a relationship.

== Cast ==
- Nancy Isime as Kambili
- Jide Kene Achufusi as Chidi
- Mawuli Gavor as John
- Elvina Ibru as Cynthia
- Sharon Ooja as Linda
- Venita Akpofure as Biodun
- Koye Kekere-Ekun as Jesse
- Uzor Arukwe as Bankole
- Toyin Abraham as Jessica
- Oge Amuta as Funmi

== Production ==
The film was jointly produced by distribution company FilmOne Entertainment in association with South Africa's Empire Entertainment and China's Huahua Media. The collaboration deal was successfully reached in December 2018. It also marked FilmOne's maiden collaboration with South African and Chinese production companies. However, the film project was in development hell over a year and it was supposed to be the first production venture for FilmOne Entertainment with director Kayode Kasum.

The entire cast and crew members who were hired to play their respective roles in the film were all reportedly below the age of 35. The colour green was depicted as the central theme throughout the filming.

== Release ==
The film was initially slated for theatrical release on 12 June 2020, but it was later pushed back to September 2020 due to the COVID-19 pandemic in Nigeria. The film producers officially announced the new release date as 16 16 October 2020 but it was postponed again due to the End SARS protests. It was finally released on 4 December 2020.

== Reception ==
A reviewer for Afrocritik scored the movie 5.9/10 saying, "The major problem with Kambili is that half the time, it seems to forget it is a rom-com...Not only is the movie longer than it needs to be, but the time and effort dedicated to brewing the romance between Kambili and her eventual love interest are also grossly inadequate."

=== Awards and nominations ===
Year	Award	Category	Nominee	Result	Ref
2022	Africa Magic Viewers' Choice Awards	Best Actress in A Comedy	Nancy Isime	Nominated	
