= Elevator Baby =

2019 Nigerian film

- Directed by: Akay Mason
- Produced by: Victoria Akujobi Niyi Akinmolayan
- Starring: Toyin Abraham; Timini Egbuson
- Production company: Anthill Studios
- Release date: October 11, 2019
- Running time: 83 minutes
- Country: Nigeria
- Language: English

Elevator Baby is a 2019 Nigerian drama thriller film directed by Akay Mason and produced by Niyi Akinmolayan. It was produced by Niyi's production company Anthill Studios, and stars Toyin Abraham, Timini Egbuson, Sambasa Nzeribe, Samuel Olatunji, Emem Ufot and Shafy Bello. Elevator Baby was listed among the highest-grossing Nigerian films of 2019.

== Plot ==
Dare (Timini Egbuson) is a wealthy, entitled and unemployed engineering graduate whose father was killed in a vehicular accident. He drinks, spends time with his jobless friends, and is unthankful for his mother's financial support. On his way to a job interview, he enters a lift with Abigail (Toyin Abraham), a poor and pregnant domestic worker. Following a power failure, the lift stops and Abigail goes into labour. He helps her during labour and this experience makes him change his lifestyle.

== Cast ==
- Toyin Abraham as Abigail
- Timini Egbuson as Dare
- Shafy Bello as Mrs Williams
- Yemi Solade as Doctor
- Sambasa Nzeribe as Stevo
- Samuel A. Perry (Broda Shaggi) as Taju
- Emem Ufot as Jide
- Ijeoma Aniebo as Nana
- Blessing Onwukwe as Madam
- Blessing Obasi as Secretary

== Reception ==
Elevator Baby received positive reviews from some film critics. It was praised for its cinematography, lighting and the acting of Abraham and Egbuson. Nollywood Reinvented highlighted Timini's performance struggles and praised Abraham's ability to carry the movie, stating that the movie was fun to watch. An Afrocritik review scored the movie 6.2/10 noting that the storyline is not captivating as the movie struggles to reach the finish line and is only saved by the performances of the actors.
