= Toluwani Obayan =

Nigerian screenwriter (born 1990)

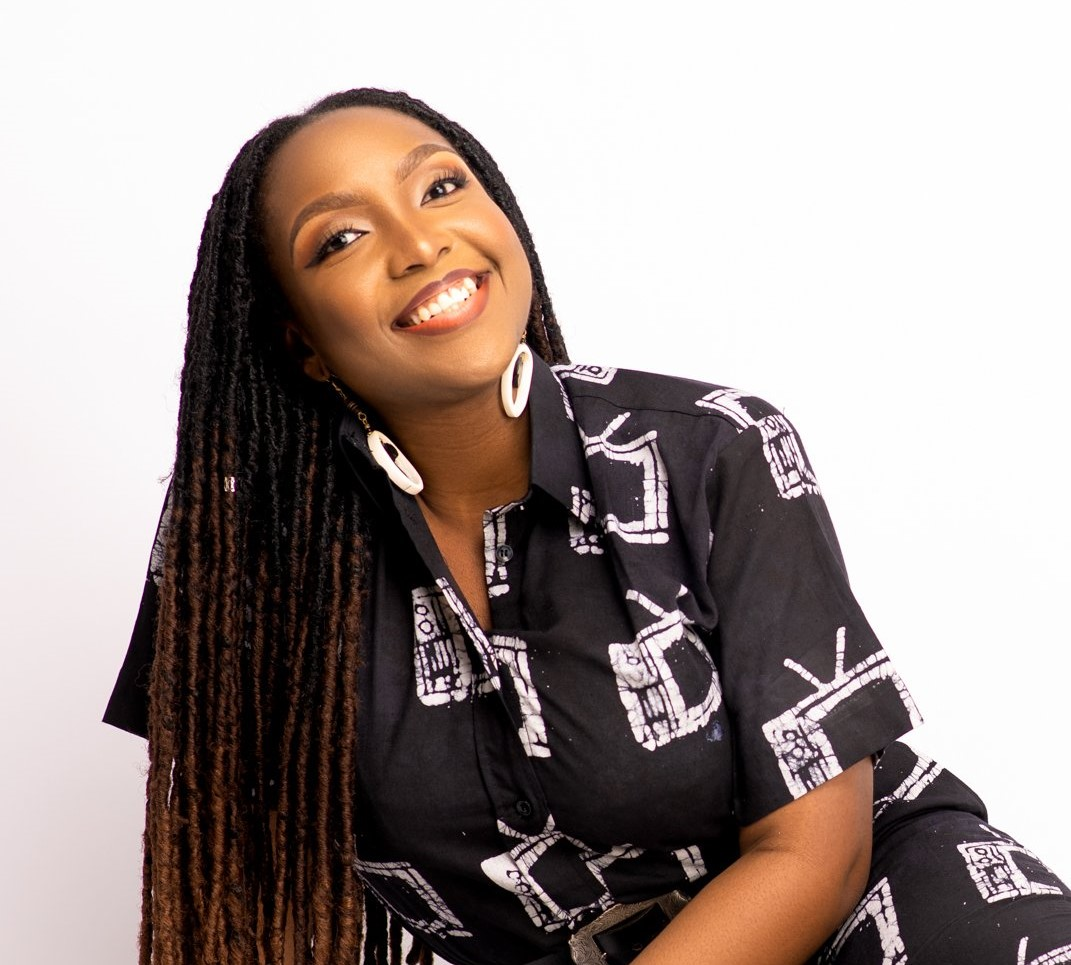
- Obayan in 2020
- Born: Toluwani Obayan; 13 August 1990 (age 36); Ilorin, Nigeria
- Education: Covenant University (Bsc); University of Portsmouth (MA)
- Occupations: Author; screenwriter; director
- Writing career
- Language: English
- Notable works: Ponzi; This Lady Called Life

Toluwani Obayan (born 13 August 1990) is a Nigerian author, screenwriter, and director known for her contributions to the Nigerian film industry, Nollywood.

Obayan wrote Ponzi (2021), a comedic film about Nigeria's economic challenges, This Lady Called Life (2020), and Something Like Gold (2023). She also directed the short film Heart & Might and authored a self-help book Becoming A Spectacular Woman (2018).

== Early life and education ==
Toluwani Obayan was born in Ilorin, Nigeria. She is of mixed Nigerian heritage. Her father is from Kogi State, her mother is from Edo State, and her paternal grandmother is from Abia State. From 1996 to 1999, her family lived in England.

== Career ==
Toluwani's career in Nollywood began as a video editor at Wale Adenuga Productions.

Her directorial debut was Heart & Might (2017), a short film about individuals involved in the fight against Boko Haram. In 2017, she was a staff writer at The Other News and became head writer by 2019. She was a screenwriter for This Lady Called Life (2020), for which she received the Best of Nollywood (BON) Award for Best Screenplay and an Africa Magic Viewers' Choice Award (AMVCA) nomination for Best Writer.

In 2021, she wrote Ponzi. She also worked on Something Like Gold. In 2025, she directed her debut feature film Colour Me True as part of the First Features initiative by Native Filmworks.

== Recognition and influence ==
Toluwani Obayan's work has been featured in Nigerian and international publications. She also participates in initiatives that support emerging filmmakers and writers in Nigerian cinema.

== Personal life ==
Toluwani welcomed her first child in December 2024, and her second in July 2026.

== Filmography ==
=== As Writer ===
Year	Title	Notes	Ref.
2017	Heart & Might	Short film, debut as writer	
2017–2019	The Other News	TV Series, Head-writer	
2020	This Lady Called Life		
2021	Ponzi	Also screenplay	
2022	Finding Diana	Short	
2023	Something Like Gold	written along with Adaeze Ibechukwu	

== Awards and recognition ==
Year	Award	Category	Work	Result	Ref
2022	AMVCA	Best Writer (Movie/TV Series)	This Lady Called Life	Nominated	
2020	2020 Best of Nollywood Awards	Best Screenplay	This Lady Called Life	Won	
