= Tarila Thompson =

- Thompson in May 2017
- Born: Tarila Emmanuel Thompson; February 14, 1968 (age 58); Lagos, Nigeria
- Education: University of Science and Technology, Port-Harcourt
- Occupations: Actor; musician; filmmaker; writer; director
- Years active: 1992-present
- Spouse: Funto Diseye Thompson
- Children: 3

Tarila Emmanuel Thompson (born February 14, 1968) is a Nigerian actor, director, filmmaker, writer and musician. Thompson began his career in 1992 and is credited for his role in pioneering the English-speaking movie industry in Nigeria known as Nollywood.

Thompson is known for Love without Language (1993), Die Another Day (2004), Passion and Pain (2004) and Church Business (2006). After taking a break from filming, Thompson came back in 2012 to shoot his latest film In the Creek, a film which has been tagged Africa's most expensive export. The film talks about the pains of the Niger-Delta people in Nigeria. As a musician, he is the owner of El-Montage Records, a music record label.

== Personal life and education ==
Thompson was born in Lagos, Nigeria. He hails from Bayelsa State, a state in the Niger-Delta region. Thompson acquired a bachelor's degree from the University of Science and Technology, Port-Harcourt. He is married to Funto Diseye Thompson and has three children.

== Career ==
Thompson began his career in 1993 in Love without Language. Thompson said of the movie that it was at a time when people only made films in the indigenous Nigerian language.

To date, Thompson has several movies, both locally and internationally, including

- Living in Darkness (1999)
- Power of Love (2002)
- Love in Bondage (2002)
- Passion and Pain (2003)
- Church Business (2003)
- Die Another Day (2004)
- Virgins Night Out (2004)
- Unexpected Mission (2005)
- Squad Twenty-Three (2005)
- Above the Crown (2006)
- Abuja Top Ladies (2006)
- Up Creek (soon to be released).
