= Quam's Money =

2020 Nigerian film directed by Kayode Kasum

- Promotional poster
- Directed by: Kayode Kasum
- Written by: Chinaza Onuzo
- Starring: Falz; Nse Ikpe-Etim; Jemima Osunde
- Production companies: Inkblot Productions; FilmOne Productions; House 21
- Distributed by: FilmOne Entertainment
- Release date: 11 December 2020
- Running time: 120 minutes
- Country: Nigeria
- Languages: English; Yoruba
- Box office: ₦89.9 million

Quam's Money is a 2020 Nigerian action comedy film written by Chinaza Onuzo, and directed by Kayode Kasum. The film stars Falz, Toni Tones, Jemima Osunde, Blossom Chukwujekwu and Nse Ikpe-Etim in the lead roles. It is a sequel to the 2018 film New Money. The film had its premiere in four different locations in Nigeria, including the FilmHouse Cinemas in Lagos on 6 December 2020 ahead of the theatrical release. It had its theatrical release on 11 December 2020 and opened to mixed reviews from critics while also emerged as a box office success. Prior to its release, it was considered one of the most anticipated Nigerian films of 2020.

== Synopsis ==
Quam Omole is a security guard turned millionaire whose life descends into a chaotic nightmare after he loses ₦500 million to a gang of fraudsters. The money is eventually handed over to the police.

== Cast ==
- Falz as Quam Omole
- Toni Tones as Eme
- Jemima Osunde as Toun Odumosu
- Blossom Chukwujekwu as Fineboy
- Nse Ikpe-Etim as Ozzy
- Williams Uchemba as Eugene
- Onyebuchi Ojieh as building manager
- Karibi Fubara as Rotimi
- Michelle Dede as Hadiza
- Gbubemi Ejeye as club manager
- Badmus Olakunle as Senator

== Production ==
The film was jointly produced by Inkblot Productions, FilmOne Productions and House 21 and also marked mthe aiden production venture for House 21. It also marked the eighth collaboration between Inkblot Productions and FilmOne Productions. Falz, who also appeared in the prequel New Money, reprised his role as Quam in the sequel.

== Awards and nominations ==
Year	Award	Category	Recipient	Result	Ref
2022	Africa Magic Viewers' Choice Awards	Best Actress in a Comedy	Nse Ikpe Etim	Nominated	
