= This Lady Called Life =

2020 Nigerian film by Kayode Kasum

- Directed by: Kayode Kasum
- Screenplay by: Toluwani Obayan
- Produced by: Abisola Yussuf; Kayode Kasum
- Starring: Lota Chukwu; Bisola Aiyeola; Wale Ojo
- Distributed by: FilmOne Entertainment
- Release date: 9 October 2020
- Running time: 120 minutes
- Country: Nigeria
- Language: English

This Lady Called Life is a 2020 Nigerian romance drama written by Toluwani Obayan, and directed by Kayode Kasum. The film stars Lota Chukwu, Bisola Aiyeola and Wale Ojo in the lead roles. The film had its theatrical release on 9 October 2020 and opened to extremely positive reviews from critics. The film is rated as one of the best Nigerian films of 2020.

== Synopsis ==
Aiye is a young single mother financially struggling to cope with the rising cost of living in the modern city of Lagos. She works extremely hard running a modest business that barely supports her to have a decent but not a luxury standard of living. She wants to prove her worth while working as a chef in order to fulfill her desire. She wants to become a renowned chef as she was abandoned by her own family.

== Cast ==
- Bisola Aiyeola as Aiye/Aiyetide Folorunsho
- Lota Chukwu as Omo
- Wale Ojo as daddy
- Tina Mba as mummy
- Jemima Osunde as Toke
- Efa Iwara as Obinna
- Uche Elumelu as neighbour
- Bamidele Akingbulu as Judge 2
- Rhoda Albert as admin lady
- Immaculata Oko as Obinna's sister
- Fubi Minaye as Obinna's assistant
- Oluwatomisin Kehinde as Young Aiye
- Elizabeth Dare as makeup artist
- Nissi Jonathan as Young Toke
- Molawa Onajobi as Joseph

== Production and release ==
The film marks the second collaboration between actress Bisola Aiyeola and director Kayode Kasum after Sugar Rush (2019). The film was predominantly shot and set in Lagos.

It was released theatrically on 9 October 2020 and premiered on Netflix on 23 April 2021.

== Awards and nominations ==
Year	Award	Category	Recipient	Result	Ref
2020	Best of Nollywood Awards	Movie with the Best Screenplay		Won	
2020	Best of Nollywood Awards	Best Use of Nigerian Food in a Movie		Won	
2020	Best of Nollywood Awards	Movie with the Best Production Design		Won	
2020	Best of Nollywood Awards	Movie with the Best Editing		Won	
2021	Africa Movie Academy Awards	Best Soundtrack		Nominated	
2022	Africa Magic Viewers' Choice Awards	Best Actress in a Drama	Bisola Aiyeola	Nominated	
2022	Africa Magic Viewers' Choice Awards	Best Actor in a Drama	Efa Iwara	Nominated	
2022	Africa Magic Viewers' Choice Awards	Best Writer	Toluwani Obayan And Kayode Kasum	Nominated	
