= Rotimi Salami =

Nollywood actor and film producer

- Education: Lagos State University, New York Film Academy
- Years active: 2007—present
- Spouse: Jumoke Salami
- Awards: Africa Magic Viewers' Choice Awards

Rotimi Salami is a Nollywood actor and film producer who has been honored by the Africa Magic Viewers' Choice Awards (AMVCA).

== Early life and education ==
He is a native of Lagos State and a graduate of sociology from Lagos State University. He also holds a Diploma Certificate from the New York Film Academy.

== Career ==
He started acting in 2007 where he featured in his first movie, Unknown Revenge, and later ventured into television series. His first movie as a director is a television series called Kuti's career Palace.

== Personal life ==
He got married in 2015 to Jumoke Salami and they have two children.

== Filmography ==
He has featured in various series like Tinsel, Superstory, Silent Night, About to Wed, Dear Mother, Kuti's Career Palace, Emerald, Alan Poza, Bella's Place, Leave My Boyfriend, 11th Hour, Papa Ajasco and Crack in the Wall; and various movies:

- Omoye (2017) as Femi
- Shadow Parties (2021) as Akinola
- Just Not Married (2016) as Lati
- Mirage (2019)
- Divorce Not Allowed (2018) as Joe
- Fate of Alakada (2020) as Lucky Accessbet
- The Lost Heir (2018)
- Diary of a Crazy Nigerian Woman (2017) as Chibuzor
- More Than Just Four Letters (2020)
- Timeless (2017)
- African Queen (2018)
- Unbroken (2018)
- Lugard (2021) as Usman
- Stormy Hearts (2017)
- The Miracle Centre (2021)
- The Oap (2017)
- Mentally (2017) as Udi
- Rancor (2016)
- Enemy Within (1994)
- A Night Before (2015)
- Hey You (2022) as Lanre
- Oko Rere (2023) as Alex
- Rush (2023) as Banji
- Open Marriage (2024) as Adeyanju
- Crossroads (2024) as Gbenga's Squad
- Unknown Soja (2024) as Galala
