= Son of Mercy (film) =

2020 Nigerian drama film

- Directed by: Amen Imasuen
- Written by: Victor Negro
- Starring: Alexx Ekubo; Linda Osifo; Nicholas Imasuen; Fidelis Castro; Edjodamen Ejehi; Cliff Igbinovia
- Cinematography: Joshua Osamwonyi
- Music by: Emmanuel Imeh Frank
- Production company: St Moscomee Limited
- Release date: 15 March 2020; (Nigeria)
- Running time: 120 minutes
- Country: Nigeria
- Language: English
- Budget: NGN 20,000,000 (estd.)

Son of Mercy is a 2020 Nigerian drama film directed by Amen Imasuen and produced by Imasuen along with Mosco Imobhio. The film stars Alexx Ekubo and Linda Osifo in the lead roles whereas Nicholas Imasuen, Fidelis Castro, Edjodamen Ejehi and Cliff Igbinovia made supportive roles. It is the story of Efe, a young man who stole his father’s pension money to travel abroad and was duped during his time abroad. He is initially unable to return home, but after many challenges, he is eventually able to return home, .

The film was shot in Edo State. Initially planned to screen on 15 March 2020, the film made its premier later on 9 December 2020. Before that, it was previewed to public in Benin City, in November, 2020. The film received mixed reviews from critics. It earned close to N8 Million during the first 31 days of its release.

== Cast ==
- Alexx Ekubo as Efe
- Linda Osifo as Princess
- Nicholas Imasuen as Slim
- Fidelis Castro as Officer
- Edjodamen Ejehi as Mama
- Cliff Igbinovia as Papa
- Gregory Ojefua as Biggie
- Kelvin Ikeduba as Chairman
- Mosco Imobhio as Princess friend
- Victor Vita as Bullet
