= Efa Iwara =

Nigerian actor and rapper (born 1986)

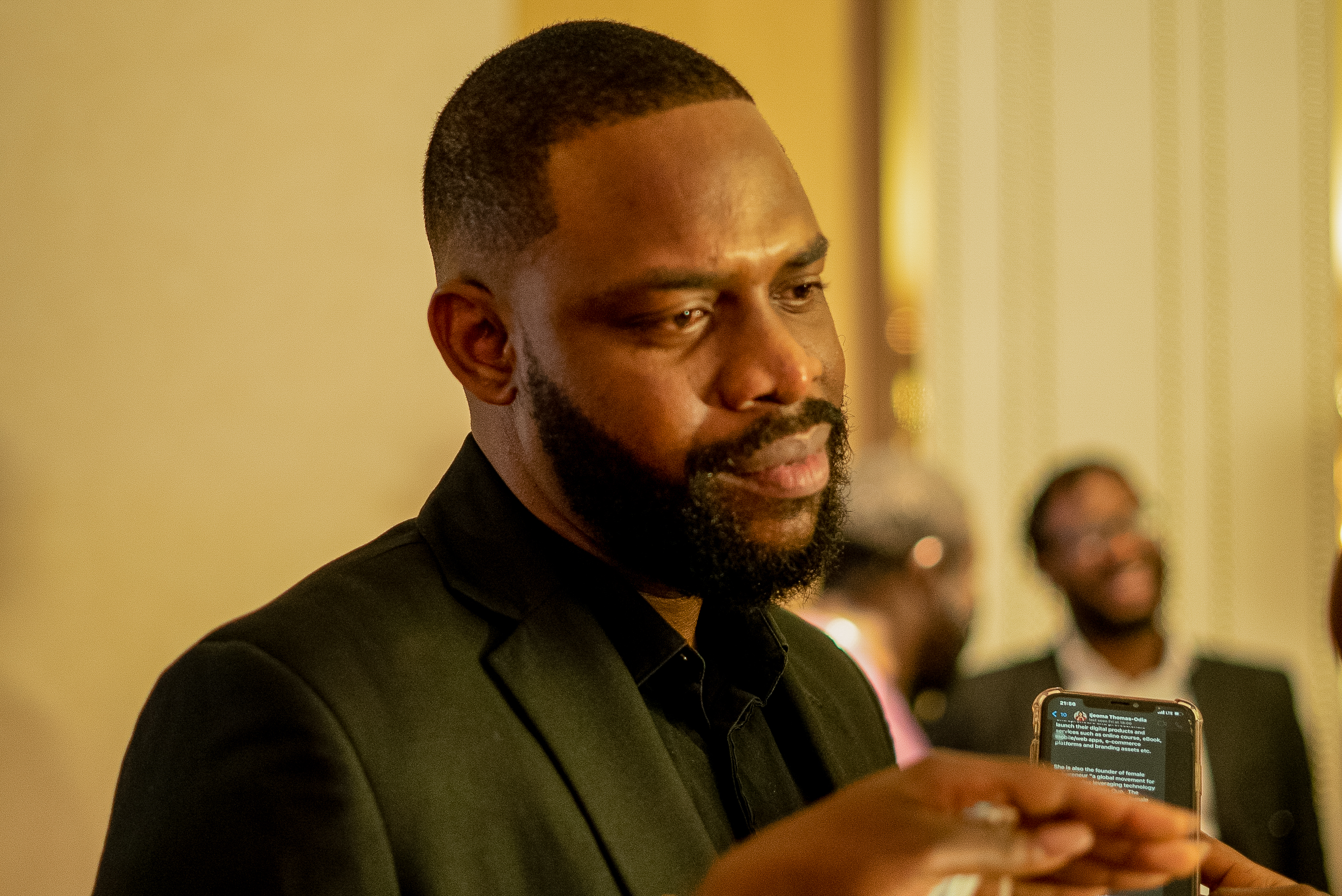
- Efe at the 2021 Africa Movie Academy Awards
- Born: 20 August 1986 (age 39); Ibadan, Nigeria
- Education: University of Ibadan
- Occupations: Actor; rapper
- Years active: 2006 to date
- Known for: Acting, music

Efa Iwara (born 20 August 1986), also known as Efa, is a Nigerian actor and rapper.

== Early life and education ==
Iwara was born on 20 August 1986 in Ibadan, Oyo State to his Professor of Linguistics father and Librarian mother. He hails from Ugep in Yakurr Local Government Area of Cross River State, Nigeria.

He attended Staff School, Ibadan for his primary education, and the International School, Barth Road, Ibadan, for his secondary education. He graduated from the University of Ibadan, with a bachelor's degree in Geography.

== Career ==
Iwara started out his career in the entertainment industry as a musician in 2006 in a group called X-Factor with DJ Clem, Bolaji, Jide and Boye. Following the dissolution of the group, he released his first single and 5 track EP called Waka EP in 2011. His last official single was titled “Fall in Love” featuring Plantashun Boiz in 2014

He made his acting debut in a 2011 episode of Tinsel as a debate moderator. He was however still focused on music at this point. His next appearance was in the first season of MTV Shuga Naija in 2013. He was absent from the acting space until 2016 when he appeared on Life 101 for Ebonylife TV. Since then, he appeared in TV series including Ajoche, an Africa Magic original, Rumor Has It and The Men's Club. He has also featured in movies like Isoken, Seven and Rattlesnake: The Ahanna Story. He earned his first Africa Magic Viewers’ Choice Award (AMVCA) nomination for his performance in Seven.

== Discography ==
=== Albums ===
- Without a Pulse (2020)

=== EPs ===
- Waka EP (2011)

=== Singles ===
- "Fall in Love" (featuring Plantashun Boiz)
- "Letter to the President Elect"
- "Sunmobi" (featuring Olamide)
- "Over you" (featuring Praiz)
- "Open and Close" (featuring Dammy Krane)
- "Obandi" (featuring Pelli)
- "Enigma"
- "E2DFA (E to the F-A)"

== Filmography ==
=== Films ===
Year	Title	Role	Notes	Ref
2024	Soft Love	Edward Obi	Comedy / Romance	
2024	Hijack '93	Captain Odion	Drama / Thriller	
2023	Pretty Evil	Ramsey	Alex Ajoku, Lucy Ameh, Rajunor Aya	
2023	Mercy Line	Dr. Frederick	Drama	
2022	Finding Hubby 2	Ade	Alongside Kehinde Bankole, Eso Dike	
2022	Ile Owo	Tunji	Alongside Immaculate Oko Kasum, Tina Mba	
2021	A Naija Christmas	Obi	Alongside Kunle Remi and Abayomi Alvin	
2020	This Lady Called Life	Obinna	Alongside Bisola Aiyeola	
2020	Finding Hubby	Ade	Alongside Kehinde Bankole, Eso Dike	
2020	Rattlesnake: The Ahanna Story	Bala	Alongside Stan Nze, Norbert Young	
2020	The Sessions (2020 film)	Banjo	Alongside Ada Ameh, Fred Amata	
2019	Seven	Kolade	Alongside Richard Mofe-Damijo and Sadiq Daba	
2019	Dwindle	Collins		
2018	The Eve	Ebere	Alongside Beverly Naya, Uche Montana	
2017	Isoken	Osato's Husband	Alongside Dakore Akande, Joseph Benjamin, Funke Akindele	
2016	Put a Ring on It	Uyi	Alongside Shawn Faqua, Osas Ighodaro	

=== Television ===
Year	Title	Role	Notes	Ref
2013	MTV Shuga	David		
2018	The Men's Club	Tayo	Alongside Ayoola Ayolola and Sharon Ooja	
2018	Rumour Has It	Femi		
2018	Ajoche	Epe		
2018	Corper Shun			
2021	Ricordi			
2021	King of Boys: The Return of the King	Dapo Banjo	Alongside Sola Sobowale and Toni Tones	
2022	Diiche	Folajimi Gbajumo	Alongside Uzoamaka Onuoha and Daniel K. Daniel	
2024	Òlòtūré: The Journey	Femi		
2024	Princess on a Hill	Oz Obiora		

== Awards and nominations ==
Year	Award	Category	Film	Result	Ref
2020	Best of Nollywood Awards	Best Actor in a Lead role – English	The Sessions	Nominated	
2020	Best of Nollywood Awards	Best Kiss in a Movie	The Sessions	Nominated	
2020	Africa Magic Viewers' Choice Award	Best Actor in a Drama	Seven	Nominated	
2021	Net Honours	Most Popular Actor	—N/a	Nominated	
2022	Africa Magic Viewers' Choice Awards	Best Actor in A Drama	This Lady Called Life	Nominated	
