= Sugar Rush (film) =

2019 Nigerian film

- Theatrical release poster
- Directed by: Kayode Kasum
- Written by: Bunmi Ajakaiye; Jade Osiberu
- Produced by: Jade Osiberu; Abimbola Craig
- Starring: Adesua Etomi; Bisola Aiyeola; Bimbo Ademoye; Uzor Arukwe; Lateef Adedimeji; Banky W D'Banj; Tobi Bakre; Mawuli Gavor; Jide Kosoko; Toke Makinwa; Omoni Oboli
- Cinematography: Femi Awojide
- Edited by: Kayode Kasum; Jadesola Osiberu
- Music by: Gray Jones Ossai
- Production companies: GreOH Media; Empire Mates Entertainment; Jungle FilmWorks
- Distributed by: FilmOne Entertainment
- Release date: 25 December 2019
- Running time: 122 minutes
- Country: Nigeria
- Languages: English; Yoruba
- Box office: ₦287 million

Sugar Rush is a 2019 Nigerian crime action comedy film written by Jadesola Osiberu and Bunmi Ajakaiye, and directed by Kayode Kasum. The film stars Adesua Etomi, Bisola Aiyeola and Bimbo Ademoye in the lead roles. The film had its theatrical release on 25 December 2019 coinciding Christmas and opened to mixed reviews from critics. Despite the mixed reviews, the film became a box office success and became the fourth highest grossing Nigerian film of all time in 202;, in 2024 it became Eleventh highest grossing Nigeria Film of all time

== Plot ==
The Sugar sisters accidentally discover $800,000 in the house of a corrupt man, Chief Douglas. In the next couple of days, they start to spend some of the money only to meet their Waterloo when the mafia comes to claim the stake of the money. However, the news gets to the EFCC (Economic and Financial Crime Commission) where they issue a search warrant for the Sugar sisters, as they are unable to find the money. Unbeknownst to the sisters, Sola's boyfriend, Andy has stolen the remaining money. As the sisters try to get the money back from him, he loses his life in the process, and the money is stolen by someone else.

Gina, the head of the mafia who's after the money, sends her men to abduct the Sugar sisters and coerce them into stealing more money from "The White Lion", Anikulapo, a notorious man known for having most of Nigeria's assets who is also Gina's ex-husband. The Sugar sisters team up with some EFCC officials and successfully steal the money. Gina meets them at a hideout and asks for her money, where she meets the head of EFCC, who apparently admits killing Chief Douglas because the money was meant to be hers. Anikulapo catches up with them and demands for his money. Things get heated, and there is a shootout. Gina loses her life in the process. Luckily the Sugar sisters and EFCC officials are able to escape with the money. Anikulapo catches up with them, takes the money, and demands they be executed in a fire, but they are able to escape. It ends in a scene where Anikulapo finds out the money was incomplete and fake, by which time the Sugar sisters have disappeared.

== Cast ==
- Bimbo Ademoye as Bola Sugar
- Bisola Aiyeola as Sola Sugar
- Iya Rainbow as Rhoda Sugar
- Adesua Etomi-Wellington as Susie Sugar
- Idowu Philips as Rhoda Sugar
- Uzor Arukwe as Knight
- Tobi Bakre as Andy
- Mawuli Gavor as Dan
- Jide Kosoko as Chief Douglas
- Toke Makinwa as Gina
- Lateef Adedimeji as Kpala
- Omoni Oboli as Mrs. Madueke
- Banky W as Anikulapo, aka White Lion
- Uchemba Williams as Obum
- D'Banj as himself (special appearance)

== Production ==
The principal photography of the film held for 14 days across different locations in Lagos.

== Box office ==
The film grossed ₦40 million in the opening weekend since the Christmas release and become the fifth highest grossing Nollywood film in 2019 with ₦58.76 million. The film entered the ₦100 million club in January 2020.

== Reception ==
Nollywood Reinvented rated the movie a 51% citing that the movie is "that new nollywood formula at its most potent: high tech gadgets plus famous celebrities plus comedy equals blockbuster". It praises the performances by Bimbo Ademoye and the directing from Kayode Kasum but concludes saying "Sugar Rush is best described as visually exciting mindless fun".

In its review, Nollywood Post says "Sugar rush was able to capture its audience’s attention from the beginning. It was a good choice to start with the torture scene. One is immediately curious to find out what had led to the event and that is laudable. Not only did it start well, but the series of comedic events in the story are also quite entertaining"

Nigerian Entertainment Today said "Sugar Rush is not perfect but as comedy movies go, it is a more holistic package than all the other big box office comedies that have been released in the last decade. It certainly nails the acting better, nails the direction better and nails the dialogues and sub-plots better. It maintains the right visual aesthetic without being unnecessarily fluffy, which can’t be said about the other big comedy movies of the last decade."

== Awards and nominations ==
| Year | Award | Category | Result | Ref |
|---|---|---|---|---|
| 2020 | Best of Nollywood Awards | Best Supporting Actress – English | Won | |
| 2020 | Best of Nollywood Awards | Best Actress in a Lead role –English | Nominated | |
| 2020 | Best of Nollywood Awards | Best Supporting Actor –English | Nominated | |
| 2020 | Best of Nollywood Awards | Movie with the Best Comedy | Nominated | |
| 2020 | Best of Nollywood Awards | Most Promising Actor | Nominated | |
| 2020 | Best of Nollywood Awards | Movie with the Best Editing | Nominated | |
| 2020 | Best of Nollywood Awards | Movie with the Best Cinematography | Nominated | |
| 2020 | Best of Nollywood Awards | Movie of the Year | Nominated | |
| 2020 | Best of Nollywood Awards | Director of the Year | Nominated | |
