= Kayode Kasum =

Nigerian movie director (born 1992)

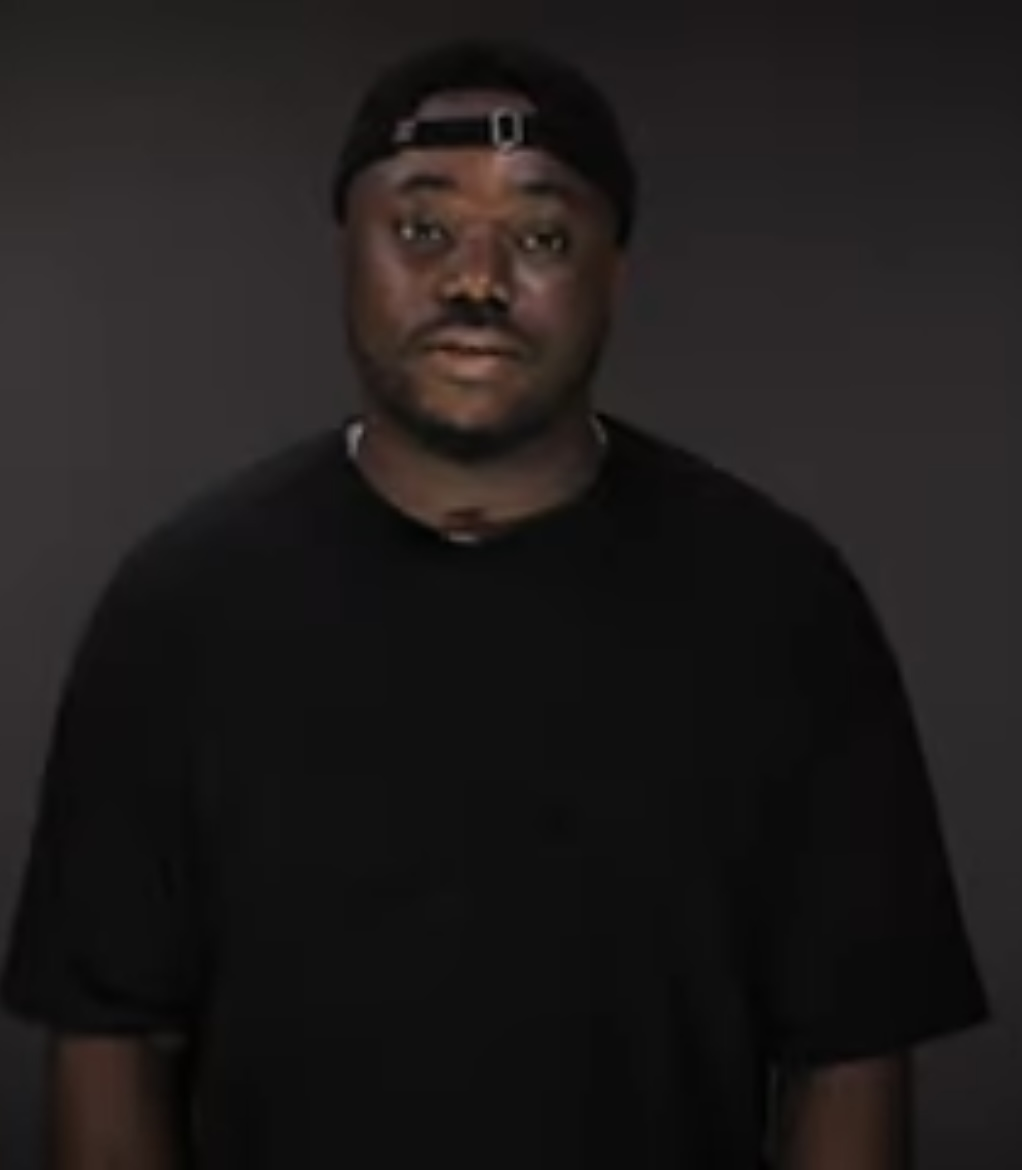
- Born: 2 February 1992 (age 34)
- Education: Yaba College of Technology
- Occupations: Director; Producer
- Known for: Directing Nollywood films
- Notable work: Afamefuna; Kambili: The Whole 30 Yards; Far From Home

Kayode Kasum (born 2 February 1992) is a Nigerian film director and producer. He is one of Nollywood's most prolific and successful directors, with twelve of his films among the top 100 of Nigeria’s highest-grossing films as of November 2025. In 2024 he was ranked the third highest Nollywood director by domestic gross value.

== Early life and education ==
Kasum was born in Lagos State on 2 February 1992. He attended Lagos State Model College, Kankon, Badagry, for his secondary education and later proceeded to Yaba College of Technology.

== Career ==
Kasum started his career in filmmaking as a motion graphics designer at Wale Adenuga Productions. He also worked as a producer in an advertising company. His first feature film, Dognapped, was released in 2017. However, he gained popularity for his film Oga Bolaji, which was released in 2018, and has made other Nollywood productions, including Sugar Rush and Toyin Abraham's Fate of Alakada. Kasum has directed over 10,860 minutes of M-Net's telenovela series Unbroken and Riona. His credits as a director include Sugar Rush (2019), This Lady Called Life (2020), Kambili: The Whole 30 Yards (2020), Quams Money, Castle and Castle Season 2, Soole (2021), and his first psychological horror film, Ile Owo (House of Money) (2022). He is also the fourth highest grossing film director in Nigeria, with box office earnings exceeding ₦767 million.

He was nominated for The Future Awards Africa 2019 Prize for Filmmaking and was listed among the top Nollywood film directors of 2020. In 2023, he was recognised for directing Something Like Gold, Afamefuna and Far From Home.

== Filmography ==
- Dognapped (2017)
- This Lady Called Life (2020)
- Oga Bolaji (2018)
- Kambili: The Whole 30 Yards (2020)
- Quams Money (2020)
- Sugar Rush (2019)
- Fate of Alakada (2020)
- The Therapist (2021)
- Ponzi (2021)
- Love is Yellow (2020)
- Sweet Face (2020)
- Killing Jade
- Phases
- Unbroken (2019-2020)
- Dwindle (2021)
- Soole (2021)
- Something Like Gold (2023)
- Áfàméfùnà: An Nwa Boi Story (2023)
- Far From Home (2022)
- One Too Many (2022)
- Egun (2023)
- Baby Farm (2025)

== Awards and nominations ==
Year	Award	Category	Film	Result	Ref
2018	Best of Nollywood Awards	Director of the Year	Oga Bolaji	Nominated	
2019	Future Awards Africa	Prize for Filmmaking		Nominated	
2020	Best of Nollywood Awards	Director of the Year	This Lady Called Life	Nominated	
2020	Best of Nollywood Awards	Director of the Year	Sugar Rush	Nominated	
2022	Africa Magic Viewers' Choice Awards	Best Writer	This Lady Called Life	Nominated	
2023	Africa Magic Viewers' Choice Awards	Best Sound Editor	Obara' M	Nominated	
2023	Africa Magic Viewers' Choice Awards	Best Sound Track	Obara' M	Nominated	
2023	Africa Magic Viewers' Choice Awards	Best Movie West Africa	Obara' M	Nominated	
2023	Africa Magic Viewers' Choice Awards	Best Overall Movie	Ile Owo	Nominated	
2023	Africa Magic Viewers' Choice Awards	Best Television Series	When are we getting married	Nominated	
2024	Africa Magic Viewers' Choice Awards	Best Director	Afamefuna	Nominated	
2025	Africa Magic Viewers' Choice Awards	Trailblazer		Won	

== See also ==
- List of Nigerian film producers
- List of Nigerian film directors
