= Broda Shaggi =

Nigerian comedian (born 1993)

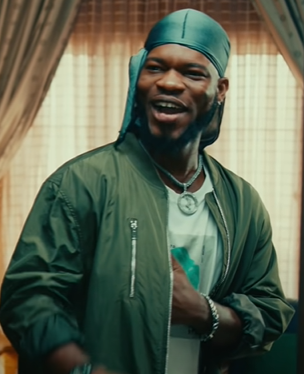
- Broda Shaggi in 2021

Background information
- Also known as: Shaggi
- Born: Samuel Animashaun Perry; Ikenne, Ogun State, Nigeria
- Genre: Afrobeats
- Occupations: Actor; Songwriter; Comedian; Musician; Dancer
- Years active: 2017–present
- Website: instagram.com/brodashaggi.com

Samuel Animashaun Perry, (born 18 September 1993) known professionally as Broda Shaggi, is a Nigerian comedian, actor, songwriter and musician. He is a two-time Best Actor in a Comedy, Movie or TV Series winner at the Africa Magic Viewers' Choice Awards in 2022 and 2023.

== Early life and education ==
He is a native of Sagamu in Ogun State but was born in Ikenne, Ogun state.

Broda Shaggi is a graduate of Creative Arts from the University of Lagos. His father was a drama teacher.

== Career ==
At a young age, he took an interest in acting as influenced by his late father who was a drama teacher. He began performing in comedy acts while in the university. He is notable for his satirical plays which he shared on Instagram. He however broke through with his parody drama Jesu in Mushin. He developed several characters before settling on the name Broda Shaggi. He is noted in the business for his comedy and unique character. He has won various awards, including The Future Awards Africa Nigeria Prize for Comedy and the City People Music Award for Comedy Act of the Year.

Broda Shaggi first gained popularity on social media platforms like Instagram, where he posted short comedy skits. His online fame led to opportunities in Nollywood, Nigeria's film industry, where he has featured in several movies and TV shows. He has also released music, including the hit song "Oya Hit Me," which features a fusion of Afrobeat and Fuji music.

== Personal life ==
Following a five-month absence from public platforms, Broda Shaggi returned online to address rumors concerning an alleged shooting incident involving him. In a public statement addressing his prolonged hiatus, he reassured supporters about his well-being and stated that he would be returning stronger.

== Discography ==
=== Albums ===
- Oya Hit Me Skits, Vol. 1 (2019)

=== Extended plays ===
- Fine Boy Agbero, Vol. 1 (2019)
- Weekend Vibe (2020)

=== Singles ===
- "Ori" (2019)
- "Bushman" (2019)
- "Shi" (2019)
- "Serere" (2019)
- "Nor Nor" (2019)
- "Wake up" (2019)
- "Black Skin Boy" (2019)
- "Bolanle" (2019)
- "Amarachi" feat. Johnny Drille (2020)
- "Toi Toi" (2019)
- "Star" feat. Asake (2019)
- "Boredom 101" (2020)
- "Kwarantine" (2020)
- "Okoto" feat. Zlatan (2020)
- "Happy Day" (2020)
- "Cross My Lane" feat. Falz (2022)

== Filmography ==
- Ghetto Bred (2018)
- Aiyetoro Town (2019) as Bayonle
- The Bling Lagosians (2019) as Shaggy
- The Millions (2019) as Party Organizer
- Fate of Alakada: The Party Planner (2020) as Kas
- The New Normal (2020)
- Namaste Wahala (2020)
- The Miracle Centre (2020)
- Day of Destiny (2021) as Babayaro
- Dwindle (2021) as Buta
- Ile Alayo (2021)
- Chief Daddy 2: Going for Broke (2022) as Omar
- King of Thieves (2022)
- Survivors (2022)
- Something Like Gold (2023) as Area Boy
- Dice (2023) as Efcd Officer
- Onyeegwu (2023) as Kabiru
- Ran Mi Lowo (Help Me) (2023) as Bode
- Love in a Showroom (2023) as Femi
- My Fake Celebrity Boyfriend (2024) as Yinka
- Alaye (2024) as Funmi
- Meeting Funmi's Parents (2024) as Musiliu
- Queen Lateefah (2024)
- Lakatabu (2024)
- Adam Bol (2024) as Snow

== Awards and nominations ==
Year	Award	Category	Work	Result	Ref
2021	Net Honours	Most Popular Comedian		Nominated	
2022	Africa Magic Viewers' Choice Awards	Best Actor in a comedy		Won	
2023	Africa Magic Viewers' Choice Awards	Best Actor in a Comedy Drama, Movie Or TV Series	Inside Life	Won	
2023	Africa Magic Viewers' Choice Awards	Best Actor in a Comedy Drama, Movie Or TV Series	Survivors	Nominated	
2023	The Future Awards Africa	Prize for Content Creation	Broda Shaggi	Pending	

== See also ==
- List of Nigerian comedians
