= Stan Nze =

Nigerian actor (born 1989)

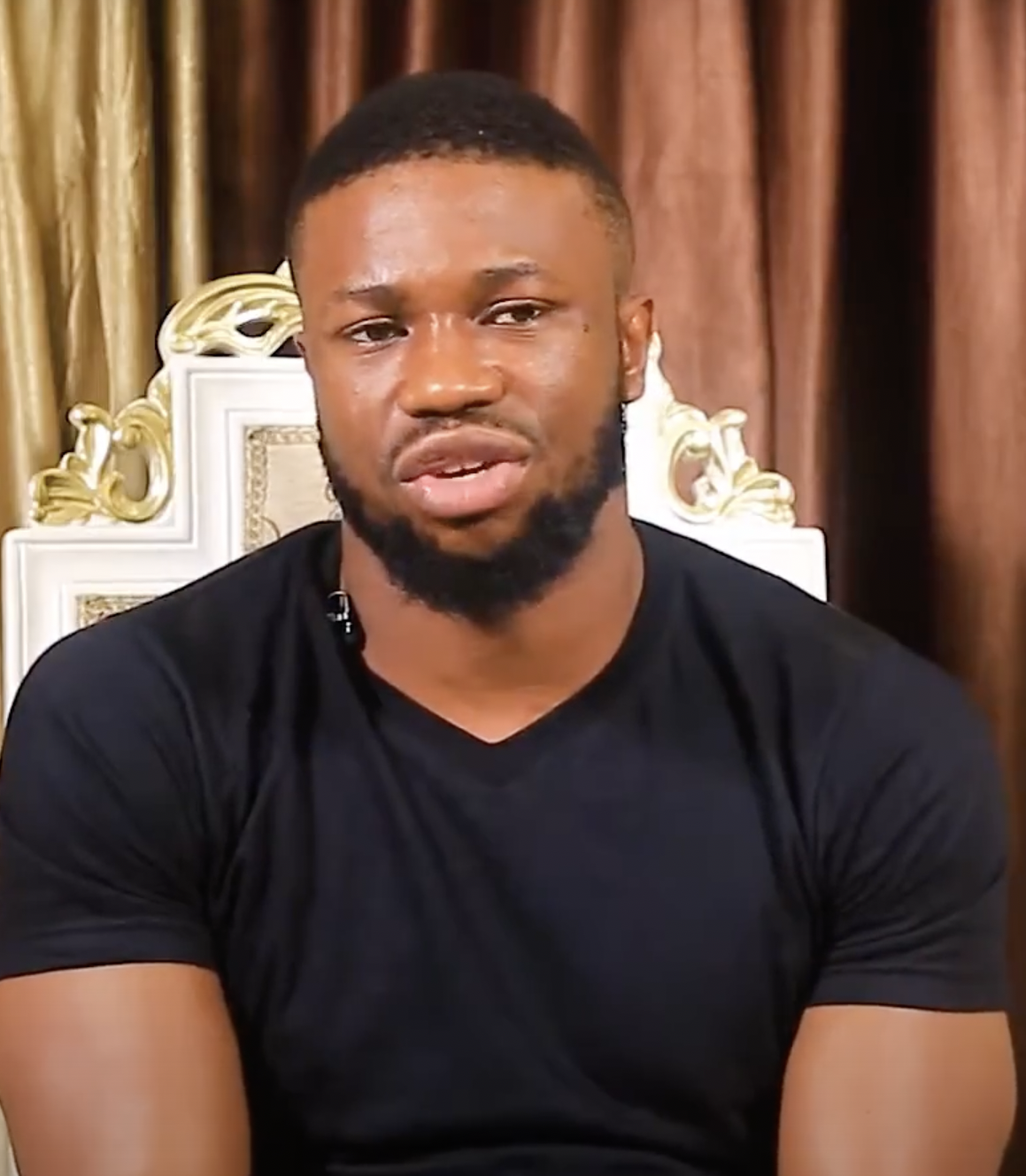
- Born: Stanley Ebuka Nzediegwu; 15 May 1989 (age 37)
- Education: Nnamdi Azikiwe University
- Occupation: Actor
- Years active: 2009–present
- Known for: Rattlesnake: The Ahanna Story
- Awards: AMVCA Best Actor in a Drama

Stanley Ebuka Nzediegwu (born 15 May 1989 and known professionally as Stan Nze) is a Nigerian actor known for his role in the 2020 remake of Rattlesnake. Stan won the 2022 AMVCA Award under the 'Best Actor in Drama' category for his role played in Rattlesnake.

== Biography ==
Stan Nze obtained a bachelor's degree in computer science from Nnamdi Azikiwe University in Awka, Anambra State, Nigeria. He also had training in acting at the Stella Damasus Arts Foundation.

He made his acting debut in a 2009 TV series named Private Sector and his first major film role was in a 2013 movie named Murder at Prime Suites where he played the role of a serial killer with bipolar affective disorder.

Nze married actress Blessing Jessica Obasi in September 2021.

== Filmography ==
=== Films ===
Year	Title	Role	Notes	Ref
2013	Murder at Prime Suites	Adolf	First film role	
2015	Bad Drop	Oreva	He also served as a producer	
2016	Just Not Married	Duke Nyamma		
2017	Omoye	Peter		
2018	Fit Fam	Iyke		
2019	The Recipient	Kamsi	With Uzor Arukwe, Bimbo Ademoye, Mary Lazarus	
2019	City of Bastards			
2020	Rattlesnake: The Ahanna Story	Ahanna	With Osas Ighodaro, Bucci Franklin, Efa Iwara	
2021	Prophetess	Buntus	With Toyin Abraham, Lateef Adedieji	
2021	Bitter Rain	Ebuka	With Alexx Ekubo, Mike Ezuruonye	
2021	Charge and Bail	Dotun Adebutu	With Femi Adebayo, Tunji Aderibigbe, Shammah Agah	
2021	Aki and Pawpaw	Donald	With Osita Iheme, Chinedu Ikedieze, Chioma Okafor	
2022	Hey You (2022 film)	Chiboy	With John Promise Adurable, Tunbosun Aiyedehin, Rita Anwarah	
2022	The Care Giver	Daniel	With Blossom Chukwujekwu, Moses Godwin, Sandra Nwabude	
2023	A Weekend to Forget	Tito	With Daniel Etim Effiong, Ini Dima Okojie, Uche Montana	
2023	Áfàméfùnà: An Nwa Boi Story	Áfàméfùnà	With Jide Kene Achufusi, Segun Arinze	
2023	Love Unbroken	Tom	With Ayo Adesanya Hassan, Paschaline Alex	
2024	Iron Bar	Iron Bar	with Segun Arinze, Mary Lazarus, Khing Bassey	
2024	House of Ga'a	Nupe Commander	with Femi Branch, Mike Afolarin, Funke Akindele	
2024	Troublous Weekend	Jason	with Kenechukwu Ezeh, Crystabel Goddy	
2024	Everybody Loves Jenifa	Lobster	with Funke Akindele and Nancy Isime	

=== TV shows ===
Year	Title	Role	Notes	Ref
2009	Private Sector			
	Tinsel	Ohakanu		
2016–17	This Is It	Sam		

== Awards and nominations ==
Year	Award	Category	Work	Result	Ref
2016	Zulu African Film Academy Awards (ZAFAA)	Best Lead Actor	Just Not Married	Nominated	
2019	Best of Nollywood Awards	Best Supporting Actor –English	Thick Skinned	Nominated	
2020	Best of Nollywood Awards	Best Actor in a Lead role –Igbo	Ishi Anyaocha	Nominated	
2021	City People Movie Awards	Best Actor	Rattlesnake: The Ahanna Story	Won	
2021	Best of Nollywood Awards	Best Actor	Rattlesnake: The Ahanna Story	Won	
2021	Best of Nollywood Awards	Best Kiss in a Movie	Rattlesnake: The Ahanna Story	Nominated	
2022	Africa Magic Viewers' Choice Awards	Best Actor in A Drama	Rattlesnake: The Ahanna Story	Won	
