= Timini Egbuson =

Nigerian actor (born 1987)

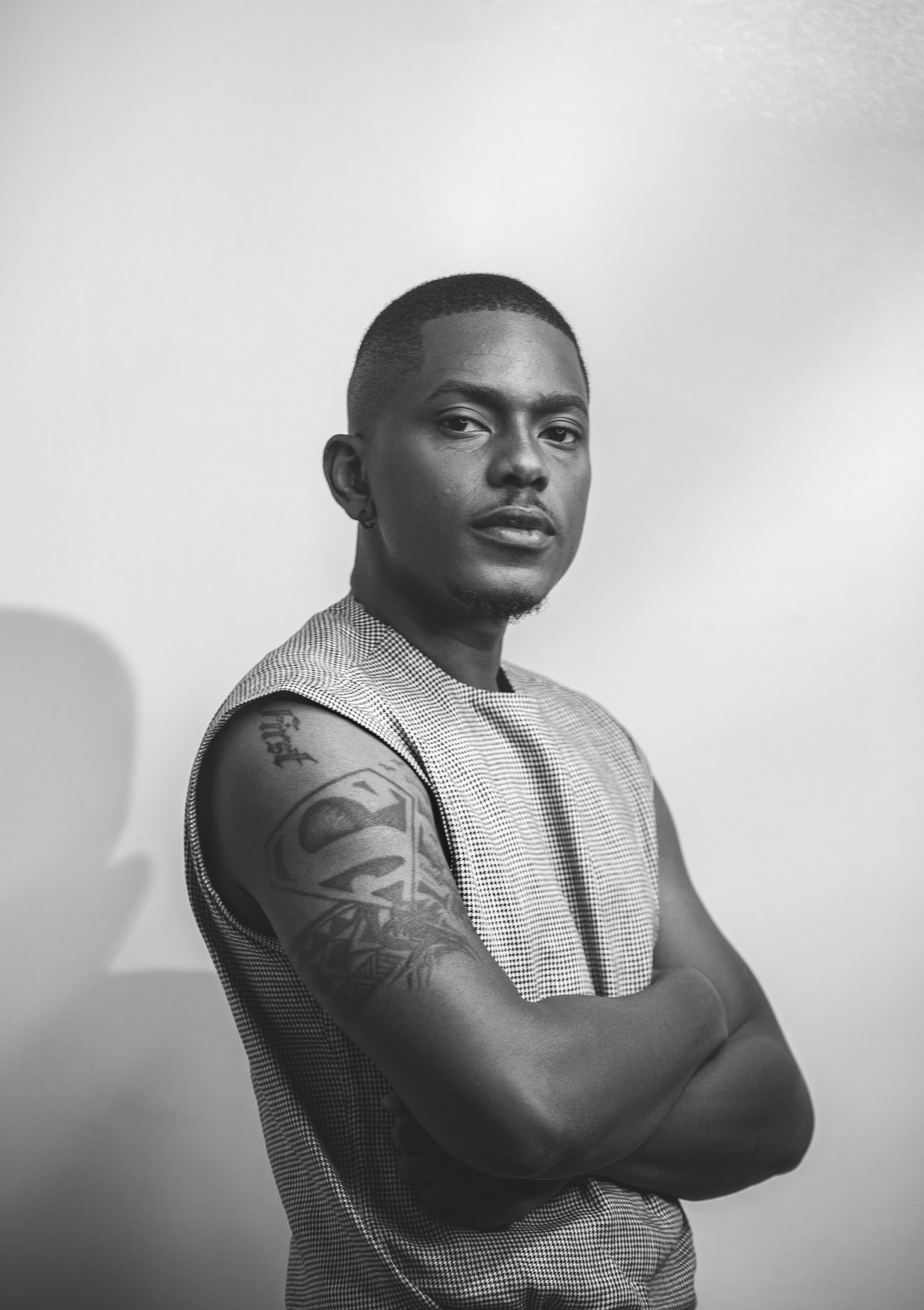
- Born: June 10, 1987 (age 39); Bayelsa State, Nigeria
- Education: University of Lagos
- Occupation: Actor
- Years active: 2009–present
- Known for: Elevator Baby, Shuga, Fifty, Skinny Girl in Transit, Manhunting with Mum, Tinsel, Sophia
- Relatives: Dakore Akande (sister)
- Awards: AMVCA Best Actor in a Drama
- Website: timiniegbuson.com

Timini Egbuson is a Nigerian film actor. He is known for his roles in the TV series Tinsel and now in other Nigerian home videos.

== Biography ==
Timini Egbuson was born in Bayelsa State, in the south-south region of Nigeria, and is the younger brother of Dakore Akande. He received his primary education at Greenspring Montessori, The Afro School, and St. Catherine’s, before attending Adebayo Mokuolu College in Lagos State. Egbuson later studied psychology at the University of Lagos graduating in 2011.

Egbuson began his acting career in 2010 with a role in the M-Net television soap opera Tinsel. He subsequently established himself as a prominent figure in Nollywood through appearances in film and television productions. In 2020, he won the Best Actor in a Drama award at the Africa Magic Viewers' Choice Awards for his performance in Elevator Baby.

In April 2020, Egbuson joined actors including Jemima Osunde, Nick Mutuma and Lerato Walaza in a public health campaign aimed at raising awareness about HIV/AIDS prevention. The initiative was carried out through a 60-part edition of the television series MTV Shuga, which featured actors from Nigeria, Kenya, South Africa, and Côte d’Ivoire as part of broader efforts to support awareness and education on HIV/AIDS.

== Filmography ==
=== Films ===
Year	Title	Role
	MTV Shuga	Tobi
2017	Fifty	Jamal
2017	Isoken	Tega
2017	Something Wicked	Oscar
2017	Ajuwaya	Collins
2017	Another Time	
2017	The Missing Piece	
2018	Kamsi	George
2018	Room 420	Jolomi Okorobube
2019	The Intern	Adegoke
2019	Elevator Baby	Dare Williams
2019	The Girl Code	
2020	Love is Yellow	Oladayo
2020	Fate of Alakada	Ochuko
2020	Dear Affy	Akin
2020	Introducing The Kujus	Maugbe
2021	Breaded Life	Sunmi
2021	Dwindle	Josiah Otunta
2021	Juju Stories	Ikenna
2021	Superstar	
2021	Country Hard	
2021	Ponzi	Ikenna
2021	Tanwa Savage	
2023	Big Love	Adil
2023	Something Like Gold	
2023	A Tribe Called Judah	Pere Judah
2023	The Kujus Again	Maugbe
2023	Maniac	Seun
2023	Tarella: Princess of the Nile	Prince Nosa
2023	A Young Time Ago	Magic
2024	Meeting Funmi's Parents	Ayo
2024	All's Fair in Love	
2024	Ajosepo	Jide
2024	Hello Pot	Jamie
2024	Unexpected Places	Chris
2024	Last Straw	Laolu
2024	Lovers & Foes	Charles
2024	Couple's Pact	Eric
2024	Shina	Shina
2024	Bad Boy's Security	Olumide
2025	Reel Love	Tomide Jobi
2025	Red Circle	
2025	Gingerrr	

=== TV shows ===
- Skinny Girl in Transit
- Tinsel
- Fifty: The Series
- Manhunting with My Mum (2018)
- The Smart Money Woman (as Bobby) (2020–2024)

== Awards and nominations ==
Year	Award	Category	Result	Ref.
2017	City People Award	Best New Actor of the Year	Nominated	
2017	Best of Nollywood Awards	Revelation of the Year – Male	Won	
2019	The Future Awards Africa	Prize for Acting	Won	
2020	AMVCA awards	Best Actor in a Drama (Movie/TV series)	Won	
2020	Best of Nollywood Awards	Best Actor in a Lead role – English	Nominated	
2021	Net Honours	Most Popular Actor	Won	
2022	Africa Magic Viewers' Choice Awards	Best Actor in A Comedy	Nominated	
2022	Africa Magic Viewers' Choice Awards	Best Actor in A Drama	Nominated	
2025	The Achievers Awards International	Best Lead Actor Of The Year	Nominated	

== See also ==
- List of Nigerian actors
