= Ekene Som Mekwunye =

Nigerian film director and producer (born 1978)

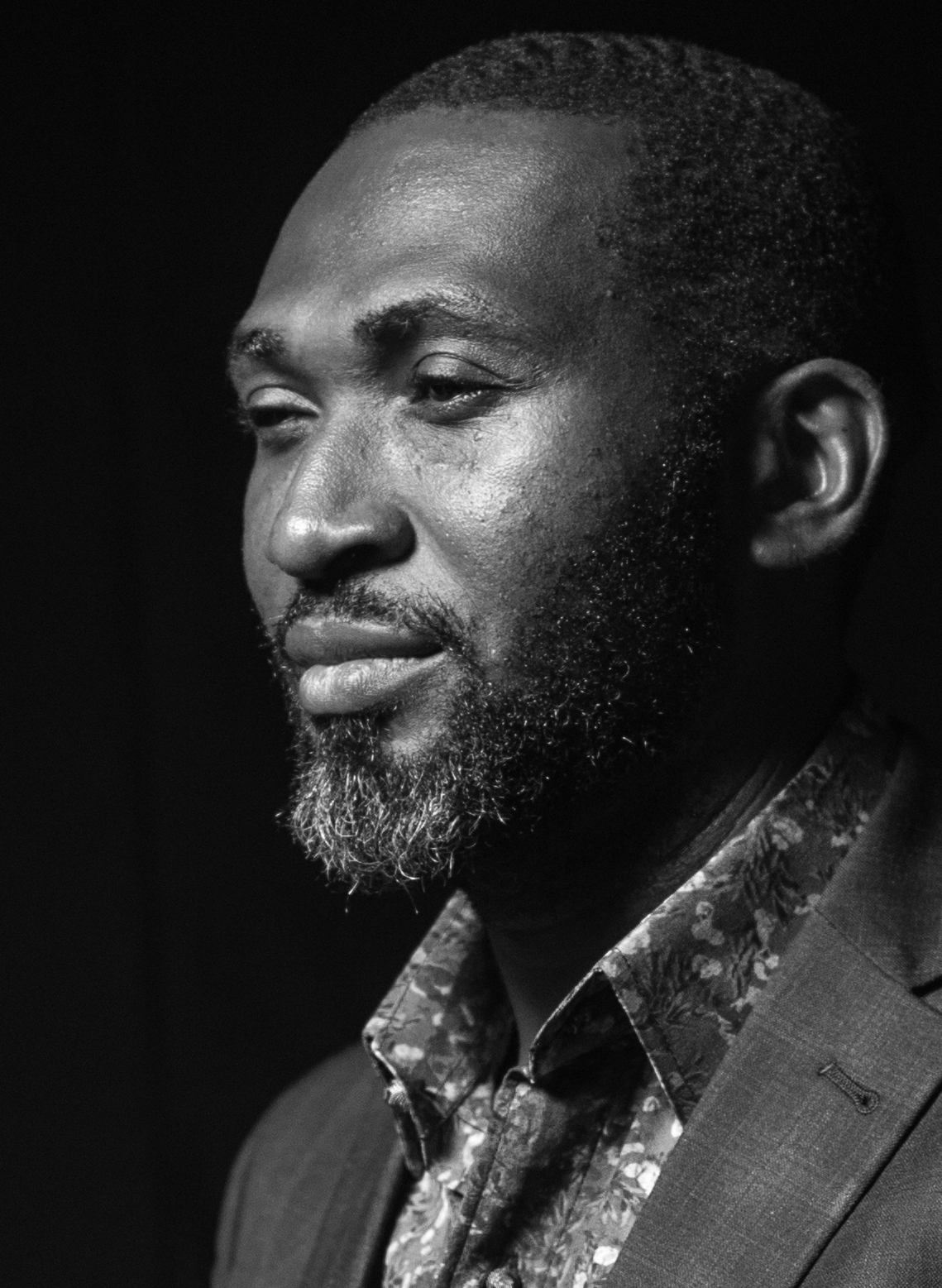
- Ekene in 2022
- Born: 22 April 1978 (age 48); Surulere, Lagos State, Nigeria
- Occupations: Film director, film producer, screenwriter, educator
- Parent(s): Ezekolie Peter Mekwunye (d. 2016), Lozie Grace Mekwunye

Ekene Som Mekwunye (born 22 April 1978) is a Nigerian film director, producer, screenwriter and educator. He is known for directing and producing films like Light In The Dark, One Lagos Night, Honey Money, Sylvia (2018 film) and Èwò.

== Career ==
Mekwunye started his career being a camera assistant at his church before securing a job at Africa Magic, where he worked on 53extra and Jara as well as all Channel O contents in Nigeria. He later attended New York Film Academy in Los Angeles to study filmmaking. Shortly after his return, he joined MTV shuga as a project coordinator overseeing the production of its hit TV series titled Shuga 3. He directed a short film, Oblivious which won an AMVCA (Africa Magic Viewers Choice Award) in 2015 for best short film.

After leaving MTV Shuga, He started his company, Riverside Productions after and created a TV show called My Big Nigerian Wedding which went on to become a big wedding reality TV show in Africa. He later produced 3 short films titled The Encounter, A Simple Letter and Lasgidi Vice. The Encounter won an AMVCA for best sound track/original score in 2017 and Lasgidi Vice got to screen at the Cannes International Film Festival in 2018. He produced his first feature film titled Sylvia, which was released in Nigerian cinemas in September 2018, they film also screened at various International film festivals including Nollywood Week in Paris and BFI.

He directed his first feature film, which he also produced with Chidinma Uzodike titled Light In The Dark, which was released in Nigerian and Ghanaian cinemas on 25 January 2019. It got 3 nominations at the AMVCA 2022 including the highly coveted Best Director. It went on to screen at film festivals in 5 continents including, Nollywood Week in Paris, Silicon Valley African Film festival and Soo Film Festivals both in the United States, Brasilia International film festival in Brazil, Durban International Film Festival in South Africa and other countries in India, Egypt, Tunisia, Nigeria and Australia. He won the Best Director award at the Kaduna International Film Festival in 2020 for the same film.

He directed his second feature film, which he also produced titled 'One Lagos Night', It was released on Netflix and the international release on their platform was on 29 May 2021. It was also the closing film at Nollywood week Film Festival, Paris which held online in 2021. It got 2 nominations at the AMVCA 2022.

In 2022, he made a film titled 'Honey Money' starring Nancy Isime, Timini Egbuson, Iyabo Ojo, Femi Branch, Babarex, Uzee Usman, Sandra Okunzuwa, Junior Pope etc. He was the director, co-producer and executive producer. The movie was released in cinemas In April 2023. Amazon Prime released 2 of his films exclusive to their platform Prime Video in April 2024 titled Ambivalent and Kali.

He directed and produced the film titled 'Move Like A Boss' which premiered in Nigerian cinemas in August 2024.

His films 'I Hate Love Stories' and 'Honey Money' screened at the Zanzibar International film Festival in August and were the first Nigerian films to screen at the film festival in close to 10 years. On July 18, 2025, he released his first non-English language movie, a compelling Yoruba-language drama titled Èwò, which means forbidden in English. It was released in cinemas across Nigeria and Ghana.

In November 2026, Mekwunye was a speaker at the inaugural Global Forum on Intellectual Property and Artificial Intelligence, organised by the WIPO in Geneva, Switzerland. He participated in the panel discussion, "The Human in the Center – Authorship and Inventorship in the Age of AI."

He is also an adjunct faculty at the School of Media and Communication, Pan Atlantic University where he teaches final year students film production and techniques. He also organises free workshops for young filmmakers called The Imagery Program where he teaches screenwriting, filmmaking and acting for screen. It has held twice. He gave a Ted Talk in 2020 in Eastern Nigeria where he spoke about the power of telling stories through films. He was one of the speakers invited by Massachusetts Institute of Technology (MIT) to speak at a conference titled 'Videography In the Hands of the People' which held at the school campus in October 2022 in Boston.

== Filmography ==
Selected filmography

| Year | Title | Major Cast | Role | Notes |
|---|---|---|---|---|
| 2011-2013 | Jara | Helen Paul, Uti Nwachukwu, | Producer | TV show |
| 2011-2013 | 53extra | Eku Edewor, Dolapo Oni, | Producer | TV show |
| 2011-2013 | Channel O | Denrele Edun, | Producer, director | TV show |
| 2013 | MTV Shuga 3 | Nick Mutuma, Timini Egbuson, Emmanuel Ikubese, Tiwa Savage, Chris Attoh | Project coordinator | TV series |
| 2013 | My Big Nigerian Wedding | Sisi Yemmie, Bobo Yomi, | Director, producer, executive producer | TV show |
| 2013 | Oblivious | Deyemi Okanlawon, Kiki Omeili, Uzor Osimkpa | Screenwriter, producer, executive producer | Short film, winner for the 2015 Africa Magic Viewers Choice Awards for Best short film |
| 2015 | The Encounter | Gregory Ojefua, Amarachi Onoh, Stan Nze, | Producer | Short film, winner for the 2017 Africa Magic Viewers Choice Awards for Best Sound Design |
| 2015 | A Simple Letter | Nancy Isime, Paul Utomi | Producer | Short film |
| 2016 | Lasgidi Vice | Theresa Edem, Bucci Franklin, Hauwa Allahbura, Tunji Ogunkeye | Producer | Short film |
| 2018 | Sylvia | Zainab Balogun, Chris Attoh, Ini Dima-Okojie and Udoka Oyeka | Producer | Feature film, available on Prime Video |
| 2019 | Light In The Dark | Rita Dominic, Joke Silva, Kalu Ikeagwu, Kiki Omeili, Bimbo Ademoye, Ngozi Nwosu, Saidi Balogun | Story writer, director, producer, executive producer | Feature film, available on Netflix |
| 2021 | One Lagos Night | Frank Donga, Gold Ikponmwosa, Eniola Badmus, Genoveva Umeh and Ali Nuhu | Director, producer, executive producer | Feature film, available on Netflix |
| 2023 | How to Love Me | Yvonne Jegede, IK Ogbonna, | Director, producer, executive producer | Feature film, available on Prime Video |
| 2023 | Honey Money | Nancy Isime, Timini Egbuson, Iyabo Ojo, Femi Branch, | Director, producer, executive producer | Feature film |
| 2024 | Ambivalent | Gabriel Afolayan, Derby Frankson, Aereis Umusu, Anita.O James, | Writer, director, producer, executive producer | Feature film, available on Prime Video |
| 2024 | Kali | Lota Chukwu, Bimbo Manuel, Preach Bassey, Nedine Love, Blessing Martyn, Doddy Abili, Christle Lotanna Chris-Okafor, | Writer, director, producer, executive producer | Feature film, available on Prime Video |
| 2024 | I Hate Love Stories | Gabriel Afolayan, Obioma Ofoegbu, Hadar Mike Sanda | Director, producer, executive producer | Production companies: Bukana Motion Pictures and Riverside Productions |
| 2024 | Move Like A Boss | Nancy Isime, IK Ogbonna, Yemi Solade, Jaiye Kuti, Tope Olowoniyan, MC Lively, Denrenle Edun, | Director, producer, casting director | Feature film, available on Prime Video |
| 2025 | Èwò(Forbidden) | Bimbo Ademoye, Ademola Adedoyin, Taiwo Hassan, Jaiye Kuti, Saidi Balogun, Akin Lewis, Yinka Quadri, Moyo Lawal, Tina Mba, Dele Odule, | Director, producer, Writer, casting director, Executive Producer | Feature film, available in Cinemas in Nigeria and Ghana |
