= Strain (film) =

2020 Nigerian film

- Directed by: Uduak-Obong Patrick
- Screenplay by: Donald Tombia; Oluwatoyin Adewumi; Eze Ekpo
- Produced by: Oluwatoyin Adewumi and Benjamin Abejide Adeniran
- Starring: Okey Uzoeshi; Shushu Abubakar; Alex Usifo; Gloria Anozie; Chinonso Ejemba; Bimbo Akintola; Sharon Santos
- Cinematography: David Whyte
- Edited by: Joshua Cassidy
- Production company: Verte View
- Distributed by: AAA Entertainment; Netflix
- Release date: September 7, 2020
- Running time: 106 min
- Country: Nigeria
- Language: English

Strain is a 2020 Nigerian drama film directed by Uduak-Obong Patrick and produced by Oluwatoyin Adewumi and Benjamin Abejide Adeniran. The film stars Okey Uzoeshi, Shushu Abubakar, Alex Usifo, Gloria Anozie, Chinonso Ejemba, Bimbo Akintola, Sharon Santos and written by Donald Tombia, Oluwatoyin Adewumi and Eze Ekpo. In 2020, it won the award for the Best International Film 2020 at the Urban Film Festival in Miami, USA and 2021 Best Screenplay film at the 2021 edition of The African Film Festival (TAFF).

== Plot ==
The theme of the film revolves around 6-years old Ekene who was suddenly diagnosed with Sickle Cell Disease and how the family struggles to keep their peace and unity after.

== Cast ==
- Okey Uzoeshi as Nnamdi Ezeji
- Shushu Abubakar as Yemi Ezeji
- Angel Unigwe as Ebere Ezeji
- Nifemi Lawal as Ekene Ezeji
- Alex Usifo Omiagbo as Grandpa Ezeji
- Gloria Anozie as Grandma Ezeji
- Chinonso Ejemba as Dr. Hassan
- Bimbo Akintola as Genetic Counsellor
- Saphirre Ekeng as Young Ebere
- Kosi Ogboruche as Young Ekene
- Henry Diabuah as Osas
- Toluwanimi Olaoye as Somto
- Olanrewaju Adeyemi as Principal
- Enkay Ogboruche as Mrs. Ify Chukwuka
- Bade Smart as MMM Competition Compere
- Nnenna Udeh as Chemistry Teacher
- Raphael Jackson as Ayomide
- Omotola Adeseluka as Ekene's Class Teacher
- Toluwalase Adewumi as Ebere's Friend
- Babara Ogunniyi as Ebere's Friend
- Sharon Santos as Ebere's Friend
- Benjamin Abejide Adeniran as Usman
- Titilope Ojuola as Secretary
