= Depth of Us =

2024 Nigeria drama film

- Directed by: Awal Abdulfatai
- Written by: Chidinma Ikechukwu-Edeh
- Produced by: Dayo Ajifowoke
- Starring: Okey Uzoeshi; Tope Olowoniyan; Binta Ayo Mogaji; Lilian Afegbai; Bade Smart; Tonia Okojia; Femi Amusan
- Production companies: Face Of Africa Media Concept & Omax Media House
- Release date: 2024
- Country: Nigeria
- Languages: English; Yoruba

Depth of Us is a 2024 Nigerian drama film produced by Dayo Ajifowoke and directed by Awal Abdulfatai. It stars Tope Olowoniyan, Binta Ayo Mogaji, Lilian Afegbai, and Okey Uzoeshi.

== Plot ==
Depth of Us explores themes of love, betrayal, and redemption.

== Awards and nominations ==
Year	Award	Category	Result	Ref
2024	Toronto International Nollywood Film Festival (TINFF)	Best Nollywood Drama	Won	
