= Light in the Dark (film) =

Light In The Dark
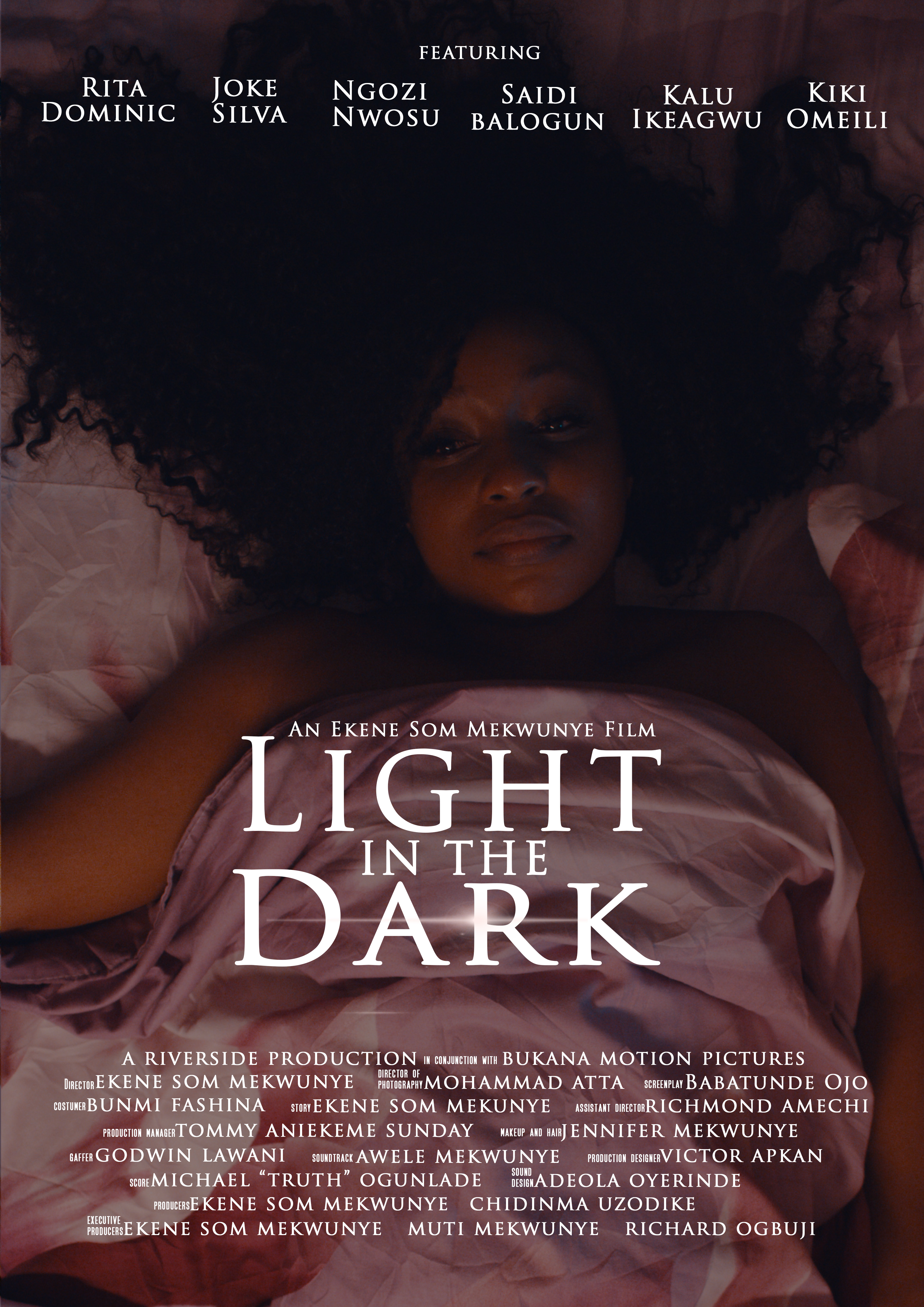
- Film poster
- Directed by: Ekene Som Mekwunye
- Written by: Babatunde Ojo
- Story by: Ekene Som Mekwunye
- Produced by: Ekene Som Mekwunye, Chidinma Uzodike
- Starring: Rita Dominic; Joke Silva; Kiki Omeili; Bimbo Ademoye; Saidi Balogun; Kalu Ikeagwu; Ngozi Nwosu
- Cinematography: Muhammad Atta Ahmed
- Edited by: Muhammad Atta Ahmed
- Music by: Michael ‘Truth' Ogunlade
- Production company: Bukana Motion Pictures / Riverside productions
- Distributed by: Silverbird Film Distribution (theatrical)/FilmOne Entertainment (Ancillary)
- Release date: 25 January 2019
- Running time: 104 minutes
- Country: Nigeria
- Language: English

Light in the Dark is a 2019 Nigerian drama/thriller feature film by Ekene Som Mekwunye. The film stars some of the biggest names in Nollywood, such as Rita Dominic, Joke Silva, Saidi Balogun, Kiki Omeili, Bimbo Ademoye, and Kalu Ikeagwu.

== Plot ==
The film features a couple, Emeka and Jumoke, who have been married for 11 years, and they have a daughter who they love dearly. Jumoke has been trying hard to have another child and hopes it would be a boy to appease Emeka's family. A gang attacks them one night and the gang leader rapes Jumoke. This puts a huge strain in their relationship, and it gets tougher as a series of events begin to unfold.

== Cast and production ==
The movie stars

- Rita Dominic as Jumoke Arinze
- Joke Silva as Mama Jumoke
- Kiki Omeili as Amina
- Kalu Ikeagwu as Emeka Arinze
- Bimbo Ademoye as Ifeoma
- Ngozi Nwosu as Mama Emeka
- Saidi Balogun as Kay
- Doddy Abili as Doctor
- Marie Awolaja as Lawyer
- Angel Unigwe as Adaeze
- Junior-Prince Unigwe as Ahmed
- Kanayo Richard as Gang Member
- Nonso Odogwu as Police Inspector
- Chukwuweike Gabriel as Gang Member
- Maxwell Chidozie Ihuoma as Michael
- Emmanuel Essien as Sadiq

It was directed by Ekene Som Mekwunye and he also produced it with Chidinma Uzodike.

== Screenings and reception ==
It has screened in film festivals in five different continents, including Soo Film Festival, Silicon Valley African Film Festival both in the USA, Brasilia international film festival in Brazil, Nollywood Week film festival in Paris Durban International Film Festival in South Africa, Diorama International Film Festival in India,

It was released in Nigerian and Ghanaian cinemas on 25 January 2019. etc. It also got four nominations at the African Movie Academy Awards in 2019. It also won the top prize for best film at the Kaduna International Film Festival in 2020 where Ekene Som Mekwunye was also awarded Best Director. Light In The Dark is currently on Netflix.
