= Monjaro =

Monjaro may refer to:

- Anthony Monjaro, Nigerian actor
- Geely Xingyue L, a mid-size crossover SUV sold in some markets as the Geely Monjaro
