= The Wildflower =

- Directed by: Biodun Stephens
- Produced by: Vincent Okonkwo
- Starring: Toyin Abraham; Sandra Okunzuwa; Deyemi Okanlawon; Etinosa Idemudia; Nosa Rex; Zubby Michael; Imoh Eboh; Kiki Omeili; Eso Dike; Angel Unigwe; Rachel Emem Isaac
- Production company: VSL
- Distributed by: Film One Entertainment
- Release date: 2022
- Country: Nigeria
- Language: English

The Wildflower is a 2022 Nigerian film written by Niyi Akinmolayan and Mannie Oiseomaye and produced by Vincent Okonkwo and directed by Biodun Stephen under the distribution company of FilmOne Entertainment. The movie unveils the different domestic abuses faced by women in the society. It stars Toyin Abraham, Deyemi Okanlawon, Etinosa Idemudia, Nosa Rex and Zubby Michael.

== Synopsis ==
The film revolves around three assaulted women who are living in the same compound. The movie takes a new dimension when one of them speaks up and it sparks a huge revolution.

== Premiere ==
Though the movie premiered on 27 May 2022 nationwide to mixed reviews from the audience, the movie generated forty million naira from the box office.

== Cast ==
- Damilare Kuku as Rolake Dabiri
- Deyemi Okanlawon as Gowon
- Toyin Abraham as Mama Olisa
- Sandra Okunzuwa
- Zubby Michael as Johntana
- Etinosa Idemudia as Mummy Osapolo
- Nosa Rex as Igwe
- Imoh Eboh as Yinka
- Kiki Omeili as Dr. Naomi
- Eso Dike as Kayode
- Mojisola Adebanjo as Pamela
- Joy Adeyemi as Dancer
- Doreen Alex as Mama T
- Adeola Alonge as Lady
- Tise Awodiya as Nurse
- Veronica Choj as Dancer
- Joy Esin as Kenny
- Faith Fucio as Lady
- Tracey George as TV Reporter
- Caroline Igben as Lamide
- Chris Iheuwa as Barrister Tosan
- Nini Mbonu as Barrister Susan
- Kachi Nnochiri as Pastor Dotun
- Jessica Okpara as Nike
- Sandra Okunzuwa as Ada Olisa
- Kester Opeyemi as Lady
- Angel Unigwe as Cecilia
- Faith Washington as Dancer
- Emem Isaac as Reporter
- Peace Joel as Kachi
- Jide Kosoko as Chief Judge
- Angel Unigwe
- Rachel Emem Isaac.

== See also ==
IMDb
