= Cheng Fuller =

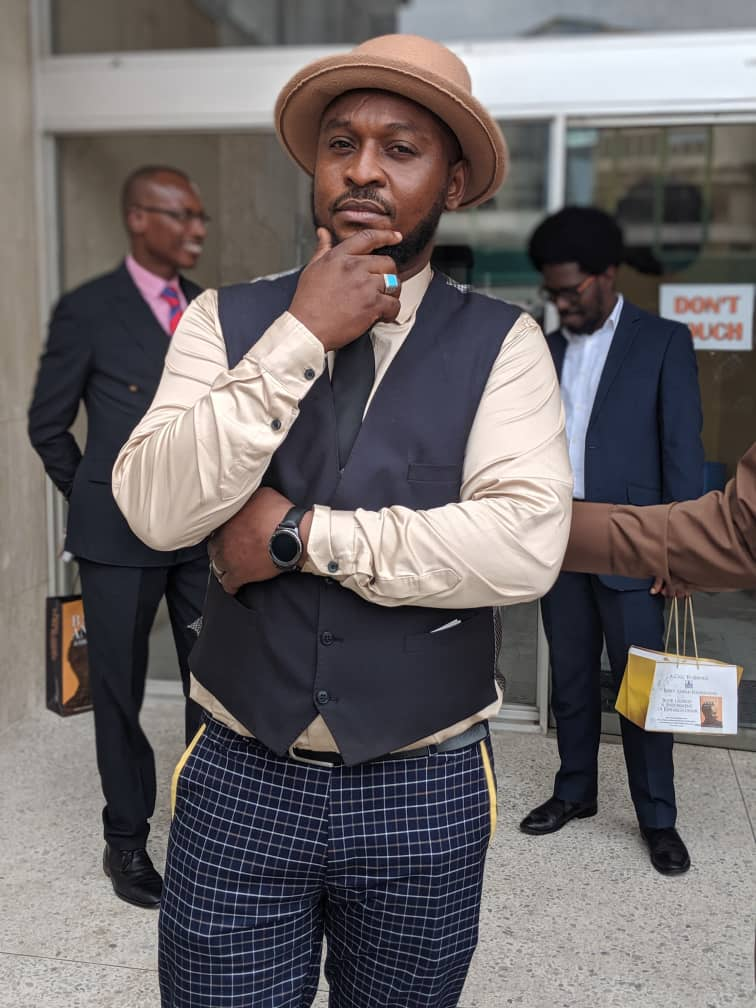
- Born: Cheng Okon Efiong-Fuller; 15 April 1980 (age 46); Calabar, Cross River, Nigeria
- Occupations: Actor, Model, Film Maker, Marketing Executive
- Years active: 2008 – present
- Spouse: Khemmie Owolabi
- Parent(s): Emmanuel Okon Efiong-Fuller; Josephine Okon Efiong-Fuller

Cheng Okon Efiong-Fuller (born 15 April 1980) professionally credited as Cheng Fuller is a Nigerian actor, model, film-maker and marketing professional who gained prominence as the inaugural Vice President of Marketing of Nigerian indigenous retail chain, Hubmart stores. He is also known for his recurring role as Barrister Taylor on DSTV's long-running telenovela, Tinsel, as well as his role in the movie Celebrity Marriage, co-starring alongside Tonto Dikeh, Jackie Appiah, Kanayo O. Kanayo, Odunlade Adekola, Felix Ugo Omokhodion and Roselyn Ngissah. He is the co-founder of Pandemonium Pictures.

== Early life ==
Fuller was born on 15 April 1980 in Calabar, Cross River State, southern Nigeria. He was born to the family of Emmanuel Okon Efiong-Fuller and Josephine Okon Efiong-Fuller. His father Emmanuel was a celebrated academician, and his mother Josephine who passed on in 1994 was a lawyer. While in secondary school, Fuller represented his school severally at debates and science competitions as well as in musical competitions as a member of the school choir, Hope Waddell Glorious Voices. He went on to study Soil Science in the university, graduating in 2003.

== Career ==
Fuller began his professional career in 2004, taking up employment with the advisory firm KPMG, where he led teams and worked in teams that delivered advisory services to leading companies in the telecommunications, oil and gas, financial services, Fast Moving Consumer Goods (FMCG), aviation, and Infrastructure, Government and Housing (IGH) sectors.

In 2010, Fuller began working at DDB Lagos, serving as Director, Strategy & Business, where he managed the MTN account and later moved to Insight Publicis, serving as the Associate Client Services Director. In 2012, he set up a Marketing Advisory services firm, Re’d’Fyne Business Solutions, which he later abandoned during the Nigerian economic recession of 2014.

In 2015, he began working with Hubmart stores, as the pioneer Vice President of Marketing. He achieved a number of notable milestones including the set up and roll out of three additional stores. In the same year, Fuller began appearing as Barrister Taylor on the long-running DSTV series, Tinsel. He has gone on to feature in several notable television series, including playing the role of the titular character in Frank's Teens, and other roles in Hotel Majestic, Eve and the Basketmouth-produced My Flatmates. Fuller has starred in full-length Nollywood productions as well, including Forlorn, Badamasi: Portrait of a General and he co-starred with Kenneth Okolie in Drifted.

In December 2019, Fuller was inducted into the fellowship of the Nigerian Institute of Management Consultants.

== Politics ==
In early 2014, Fuller registered in the People's Democratic Party (PDP) Ward 11, Calabar South Constituency 2, and campaigned for a seat in the Cross River State House of Assembly representing the constituency. He however lost his nomination at the party primaries.

== Pandemonium Pictures and Film making ==
In June 2019, Fuller co-founded an audio-visual production company, Pandemonium pictures with his friend and business partner. The company commenced pre-production on some movie and television projects and is involved in the set up of an independent content broadcast platform for Nigerian film content. In November 2019, it was announced that Pandemonium pictures had begun production on a new film, Black Fate. On 23 November 2019, he released a short film, Endless on the Pandemonium Pictures imprint. The movie had a domestic violence theme, and is the first chapter in the 13 chapter series. In January 2020, Pandemonium pictures began production on a feature film, The Three Ms and a television series, The Benjamins.

== Personal life ==
On 23 November 2019, he married his wife Khemmie Owolabi in a private ceremony in Lagos, Nigeria.

== Filmography ==
Year	Title	Role	Director	Notes
2014	The Johnsons	Greedy Neighbour	Solomon Mcauley, Charles Inojie	TV series
2014 - 2016	Hotel Majestic	Doctor	Various	TV series featuring Oge Okoye, David Jones, Sadiq Daba, Ivie Okujaye, Akin Lewis, Patricia Young, Timi Richards
2015 - 2016; 2019 -	Tinsel	Barrister Taylor	Various	TV series (series regular)
2016	Forlon	Sub-lead	Aniedi Noba	Feature Film
2016	The American King	Supporting role	Jeta Amata	Feature Film
2017	Home Coming	Sub-lead	Ubong bassey Nya	Feature Film
2017	Celebrity Marriage	Obsessed fan	Pascal Amanfo	Feature Film featuring Tonto Dikeh, Jackie Appiah, Kanayo O Kanayo, Odunlade Adekola, Felix Omokhodion and Roselyn Ngissah
2017	Secrets	Lead	Film Lord	Feature Film
2018	Drifted	Sub-lead	Ubong bassey Nya	Feature film featuring Kenneth Okolie
2018	My Flatmates	Kanu	John Njamah	TV series produced by Basketmouth
2018	Frank's Teens: Diary of a Single Father	Frank	Nonso Emekaekue	Lead Role/Series produced by Gordon Irole
2018	Eve	Chef	Various	TV series
2018	Going the Distance	Sub-Lead	Emma Anyaka	Feature Film
2018	Far From Perfect	Sub-Lead	Emma Anyaka	Feature Film
2018	Badamasi: Portrait of a General	Brigadier General Nimyel Dogonyaro	Obi Emelonye	Feature Film
2019	Sting	Jayden	Khing Bassey	Feature Film
2019	Dreaming the Impossible	Okon	Obi Emelonye	Feature Film
2019	Charlie Charlie		Charles Uwagbai	Post production
2019	Endless	Husband	David Campbell	Short film on domestic violence featuring Felix Ugo Omokhodion
