= Michelle Dede =

Nigerian actress (born 1984)

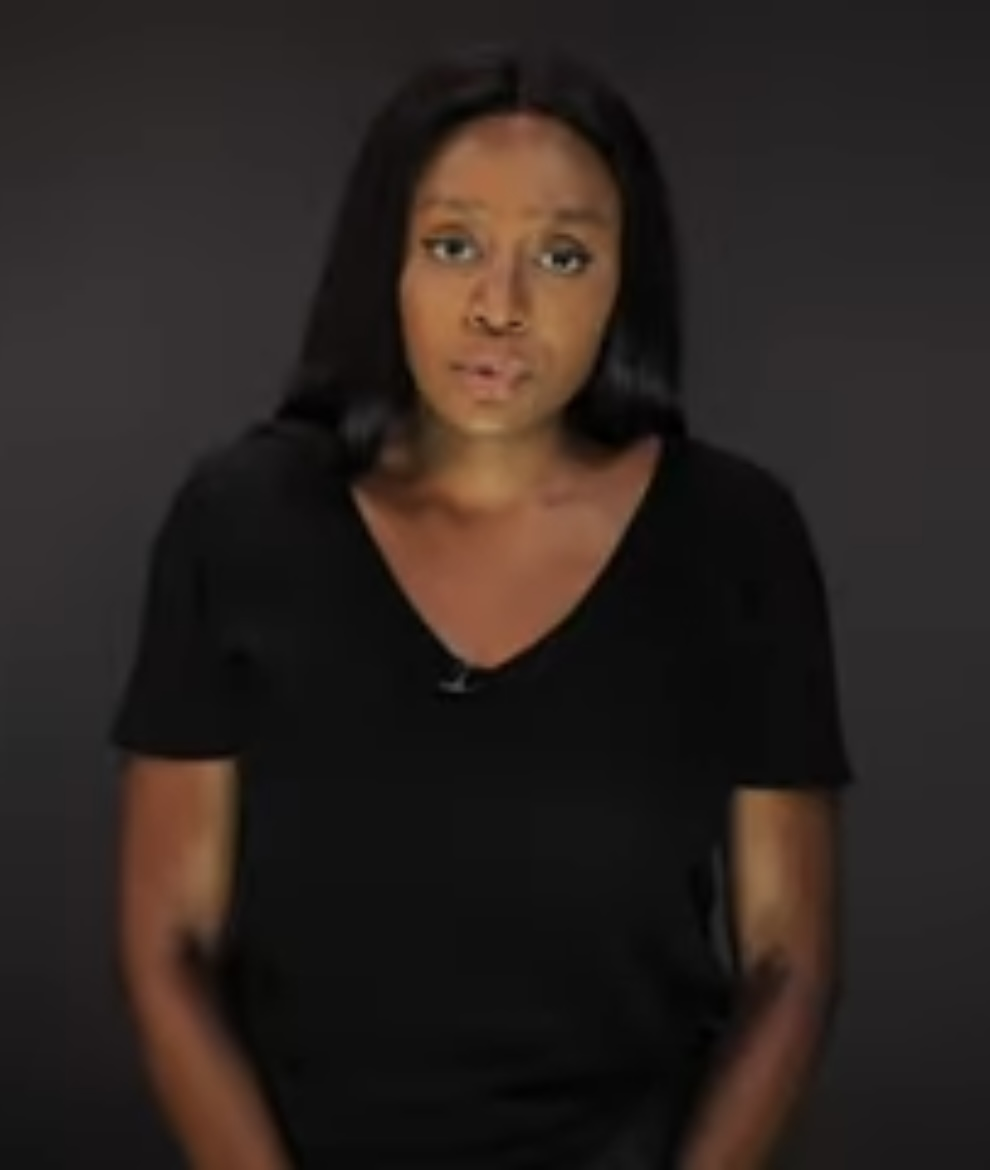
- Born: Michelle Dede; 23 March 1984 (age 42); Germany
- Years active: 2006–present
- Known for: Television host
- Notable work: Desperate Housewives Africa

Michelle Dede (born 23 March 1984) is a Nigerian freelance television presenter and actress. She co-produced the film Flower Girl, starred in the television series Desperate Housewives Africa and the 2017 drama thriller What Lies Within.

== Early life and education ==
Michelle Dede was born on 23 March in Germany, to the family of Brownson Dede, a Nigerian diplomat and former ambassador to Ethiopia and Australia. She had her early education in Brazil, her secondary and high school education was completed in Australia and Ethiopia respectively. She later proceeded to the United Kingdom to study fashion design and marketing at the American College in London. She also holds a postgraduate degree in communications and PR from the same institution.

== Career ==
Her career started following a holiday in Nigeria. In 2006, alongside Olisa Adibua, she co-hosted the debut edition of Big Brother Nigeria, a Nigerian television series based on the Big Brother series. She later co-produced the 2013 film Flower Girl before she went on to star as Tari Gambadia in the television series Desperate Housewives Africa. She cites Oprah Winfrey as her inspiration as a television host. In 2017, Dede starred in the Nigerian drama thriller film What Lies Within with Paul Utomi, Kiki Omeili and Tope Tedela. In 2018, she starred in Moms at War.

== Filmography ==
- Flower Girl (2013) as co-producer
- Desperate Housewives Africa (2015) as Tari Gambadia
- What Lies Within (2017) as Fiona
- Moms at War (2018) as Zainab
- Up North (2018) as Idara Otuekong
- Eve (2019) as Kemi Adebayo
- A Soldier's Story 2: Return from the Dead (2020) as Capt. Nimma
- The Therapist (2021) as Gari
- La Femme Anjola (2021)
- Third Party (2022)
- Love and Life (2023) as Ivy
- With Difficulty Comes Ease (2024) as Nene
- Ms. Kanyin (2025) as Ms. Kanyin

== Personal life ==
Dede is the sister of comedian Najite Dede and is a brand ambassador for the beauty company Emmaus Beauty.

== Awards and nominations ==
Year	Award	Category	Film	Result	Ref
2017	Best of Nollywood Awards	Best Actress in a Lead role –English	What Lies Within	Won	
