= Kiki Omeili =

Nigerian actress

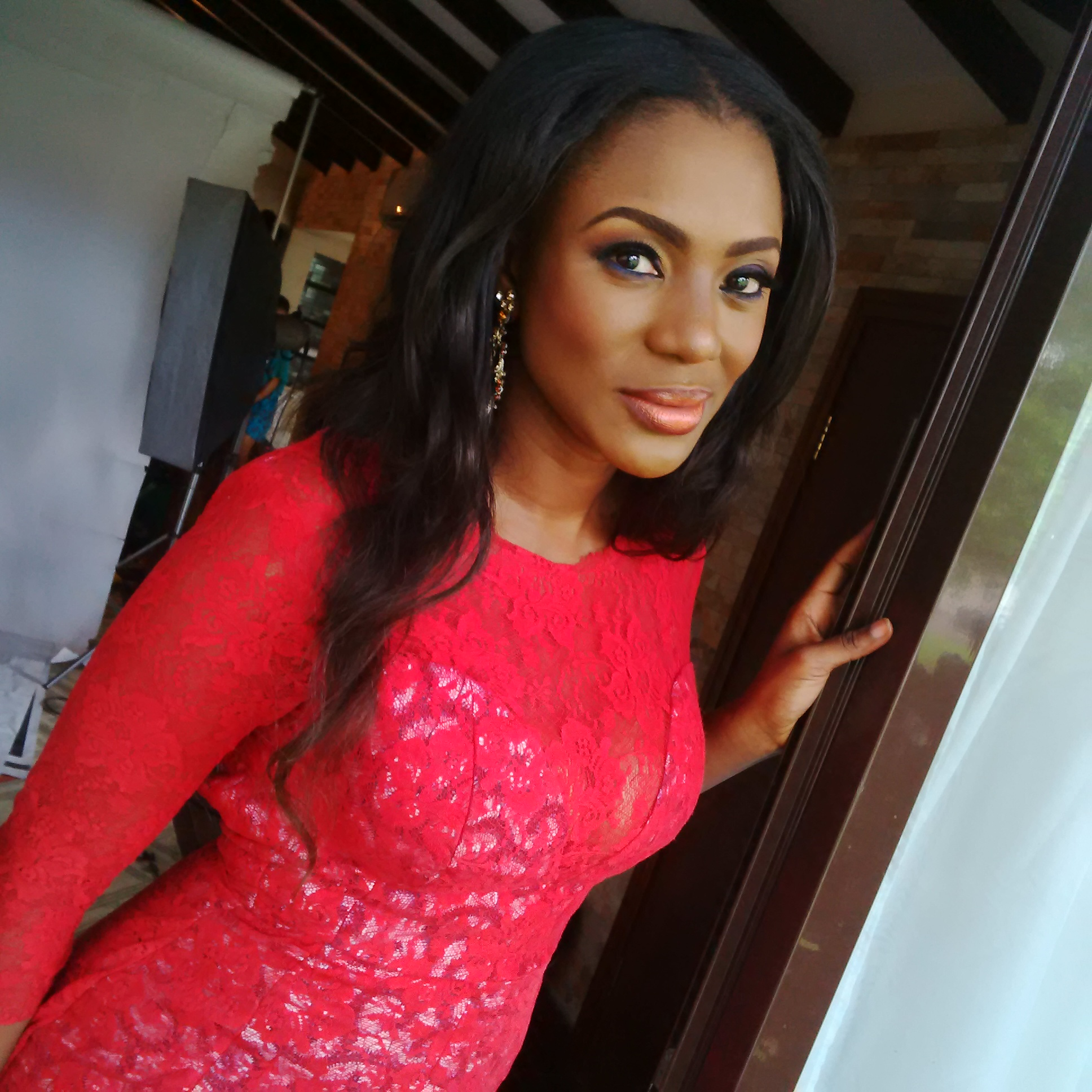
- Born: Nkiruka Omeili; 31 May 1986 (age 40); Lagos, Nigeria
- Citizenship: Nigeria
- Education: University of Lagos
- Occupations: Actress; Television presenter; Medical doctor
- Years active: 2011 — present
- Known for: her role as Lovette in the TV series Lekki Wives
- Parents: Charles (father); Maureen (mother)
- Awards: Best Supporting Actress of the Year at the 2016 City People Entertainment Awards

Nkiruka 'Kiki' Omeili (born 31 May 1986) is a Nigerian actress, best known for her role as Lovette in the TV series Lekki Wives. She is also known for her role as Blessing in the 2015 crime caper, Gbomo Gbomo Express alongside Gideon Okeke.

== Early life and education ==
Omeili was born in Lagos, and is the second of four children of Charles and Maureen Omeili. She is of Igbo ethnicity from Nimo in Anambra State. Her father, Charles, was a banker with First Bank Nigeria and retired as a general manager, while her mother, Maureen, was the controller of prisons in Ibadan, Oyo State, Nigeria. Omeili began performing in stage plays all through her primary and secondary school years. This continued when she got into the university as she was a member of the drama club and acted in various productions as well as taking part in several drama competitions. In 2006, she obtained a Medical degree from the College of Medicine, University of Lagos.

== Career ==
In 2011, Omeili auditioned for and got the role of Debbie in the TV series Behind the Smile. In 2012, she teamed up with the director of Behind the Smile, Tunde Olaoye, to star in her debut feature film Married but living single where she worked with Funke Akindele, Joseph Benjamin, Femi Brainard and Joke Silva. Omeili has had roles in a number of TV series including The Valley Between, NESREA Watch, Lekki Wives and Gidi Culture.

Asides from her acting roles, in 2011 Omeili hosted the Dance reality TV show Dance 234, a Koga entertainment production.

In August 2013, it was announced that Lekki Wives would be renewed for a second season, and Omeili's contract was renewed to reprise her role as Lovette.

Early 2016, she starred in the Nigerian Box Office hit Couple of Days, where her portrayal of the character Joke, got wonderful reviews from critics. In May 2016, Iterum a short film directed by Stanlee Ohikhuare and starring Omeili and Paul Utomi was premiered at the 69th Annual Cannes Film Festival.

On May 31, 2016, Omeili made her debut as a movie producer, with the release of the short film Unprotected. The film is based on true events, which she observed as a medical student in the university. The film features Omeili, as the lead character, and Eric Didie, Bimbo Ademoye, Blessing Ambrose and Nathan Kingsley in supporting roles.

In June 2018, Omeili began production of her debut full-length feature film, Run, which was directed by Uche Chukwu. The movie Run was released in cinemas on August 23, 2019 starring comedian Owen Gee, Rotimi Salami, Kelechi Udegbe, and Greg Ojefua. It was also selected to screen at the Silicon Valley International Film Festival in California and the Slum International Film Festival in Kenya and received an award at the Toronto International Nollywood Film Festival in Canada.

In February 2023, Omeili was unveiled as one of the new cast members on MTV Shuga.

== Awards and recognition ==
In October 2012, Omeili received the award for the Best Actress (Supporting Role in an English language film) at the 17th African Film Awards in London.

In May 2014, Omeili was listed among the Top 25 New Faces of Nollywood by Nigerian Entertainment Today. She had also been listed by Nigerian newspaper The Sun as one of Nollywood's fastest rising stars earlier in 2014.

Omeili was nominated for the TV Actress of the Year at the ELOY Awards in November 2014. She was nominated for her lead role in the Television series Lekki Wives.

In October 2015, Omeili won the award for the Best Supporting Actress for her role in the Movie Sting, at the 2015 Golden Icons Academy Movie Awards which held in the USA.

In July 2016, Omeili won the award for Best Supporting Actress of the Year at the 2016 City People Entertainment Awards in Lagos, Nigeria.

In October 2016, Omeili was nominated for Best Lead Actress in a Short Film at the 2016 Berlin International Film Festival for her role in the film, Deluded.

Omeili, was unveiled as a Festival Ambassador at the 2017 Realtime film festival in recognition of her contribution to the Nigerian film industry.

In 2018, Omeili won the best supporting actress award at the World Music & Independent Film Festival, which held in the Caribbean Islands for her role in the movie 3Some. In the same year, she was also nominated for Best Actress at the Realtime film festival.

== Humanitarian work ==
Omeili has been involved in humanitarian work with Project Pink Blue. She led their cancer awareness walk, helping the cancer nonprofit raise funds and awareness through social media and events.

== Filmography ==
Year	Title	Role	Director	Notes
2011	Behind the Smile	Debbie	Tunde Olaoye	Lead Role/TV Series
2011	Nowhere to be Found	Dr. Grace	Niji Akanni	TV series
2011	Footprints	Edna	Jerry Isichei	Sub-Lead/TV Series
2012	Married but Living Single	Titi Haastrup	Tunde Olaoye	Feature Film
2012	NESREA Watch	Mrs. Irabor	Paul Adams	TV Drama/Informative
2012	Binding Duty	Njide	Ihria Enakimio	TV Drama/Informative
2012	The Valley Between	Nikki	Tunji Bamishigbin	Sub-Lead/TV Series
2012	Gidi Culture	Mariam	Tunde Anjorin	Sub-Lead/Series
2012	A Mother's Fight	Uru	Flo Smith	Sub-Lead/Short Film produced by Uche Jombo
2012	Lekki Wives	Lovette	Blessing Effiom Egbe	Lead Role/Series
2013	Kpians: The Feast of Souls	Kiki Ofili	Stanlee Ohikhuare	Horror Movie also starring Ashionye Ugboh-Raccah
2013	Consenting Adults	Seun	Soji Ogunnaike	Feature Film; starring Nomoreloss
2013	24/7	Barrister Ekanem	Efetobore Ayeteni	Feature Film starring IK Osakioduwa, Eku Edewor and Wole Ojo
2013	Oblivious	Lucy	Stanlee Ohikhuare/Ekene Som Mekwunye	Short Film
2013	Lekki Wives (season 2)	Lovette	Blessing Effiom Egbe	Lead Role/TV Series
2013	Sting	Ada	Stanlee Ohikhuare	Feature Film
2013	The Glass House	Ese	Jerry Isichei	Feature Film
2014	The Antique	Isoken	Darasen Richards	Feature Film starring Olu Jacobs, Bimbo Akintola and Judith Audu
2014	Same Difference	Nonye	Ehizojie Ojesebholo	Feature Film starring Ricardo Agbor and Daniel K Daniel
2014	A Dead End	Biola	Ehizojie Ojesebholo	Feature Film starring Barbara Sokky, Seun Akindele and Uche Anyamele
2014	Next Door to Happiness	Tinuke	Uzodimma Okpechi	Feature Film starring Frederick Leonard
2014	A Place Called Happy	Teni	LowlaDee	Feature Film starring Blossom Chukwujekwu
2014	Friends and Lovers	Jenny	Yemi Morafa	Feature Film starring Deyemi Okanlawon
2014	+234	Sandra Lawson	Soji Ogunnaike	Drama Series starring Tosyn Bucknor, Tope Tedela and Anthony Monjaro
2015	Gbomo Gbomo Express	Blessing	Walter Taylour	Feature film - starring Ramsey Nouah
2015	Jimi Bendel	T-boy	Ehizojie Ojesebholo	Action Comedy film
2016	Fast Cash	-	Okey Zubelu Okoh	Feature film - starring Mary Lazarus, Oma Nnadi, Funnybone
2016	What Makes You Tick	-	Efetobore Ayeteni	Feature film - starring Seun Akindele, Mary Lazarus, Wole Ojo, Toyin Abraham
2016	Iterum	Ireti	Stanlee Ohikhuare	Short film - screened at the 2016 Cannes Film Festival in Paris, France
2016	Fast Cash		Okey Zubelu	Feature film
2016	Blame It on Me	-	Ikechukwu Onyeka	Feature film
2016	The Happiness Limited	-	Imoh Umoren	Feature film
2016	Double bind	Lead	Emmanuel Akaemeh	Feature film featuring Ifeanyi Kalu, Ujams Cbriel, Mary Chukwu
2016	This Thing Called Marriage	-	Blessing Egbe	Feature film
2016	Moth To A Flame	Joan	One Soul	Feature film - Femi Jacobs, Shaffy Bello, Paul Utomi
2017	When Men Promise	Chioma		
2017	Echoes of Silence	-	Okey Ifeanyi	Feature film
2017	Low lives and High Hopes	-	Frankie Ogar	Feature film
2017	Light in the Dark	-	Ekene Som Mekwunye	Feature film featuring Angel Unigwe, Joke Silva, Rita Dominic, Kalu Ikeagwu, Ngozi Nwosu, Saidi Balogun among others.
2017	What Lies Within	Miss Dimeji	Vanessa Nzediegwu	Feature film starring Michelle Dede, Tope Tedela, Paul Utomi
2017	Sunday and Lolade	Lolade	Yomi Black	Comedy Skit Compilation
2017	Omoye	Omoye	Uche Chukwu	Feature film starring Kiki Omeili, Tina Mba, Stan Nze, Rotimi Salami
2017	Public Property		Tope Alake & Ashionye Mihcelle Raccah	Feature film
2019	Run	Tomi	Uche Chukwu	Feature Film, produced by Kiki Omeili starring Rotimi Salami, Owen Gee, Kelechi Udegbe, Kiki Omeili, Gregory Ojefua and Alex Oturu
2021	Hide and Seek	Nnena	Tolu Lord Tanner	Feature Film, crime thriller featuring Efa Iwara, Bimbo Ademoye and Akah Nnani
2022	Wildflower		Biodun Stephen	Feature Film featuring Jide Kosoko, Etinosa Idemudia
2022	Toxic	Bee	Yemi Jolaoso	Feature length film
2023	MTV Shuga	Tomi	Yemi Morafa	MTV Original series, starring Adesua Etomi, Okey Uzoeshi, John Njamah and others
2023	Dr. Love	Winifred	Uche Jumbo, Mary Remmy Njoku	Drama
2024	It Blooms in June	Joanna Diri	Akorede Azeez	With Femi Jacobs

== See also ==
- List of Nigerian actors
