= Keira Hewatch =

Nigerian actress (born 1985)

- Born: 8 November 1985 (age 40); Calabar, Cross River, Nigeria
- Occupations: Actress; singer; songwriter; writer
- Years active: 2009–present
- Known for: Peace Nwosu in Lekki Wives

Keira Hewatch (/ˈkɪərə ˈhiːwɒtʃ/ KEER-ə HEE-wotch; born 8 November 1985) is a Nigerian actress, singer, songwriter and writer, best known for her role as Keche in the movie Two Brides and a Baby, as well as her role as Peace Nwosu in the television series Lekki Wives. Hewatch won the Best of Nollywood award (BON) for Best Breakout Performance in 2011 and has been nominated twice for the Golden Icon Academy Awards (GIAMA).

== Early life and background ==
Hewatch was born in Calabar, Cross River State. Her mother, Elizabeth Hewatch who passed away in 2021 was a teacher with the police force, raised her as a single parent. Her mother was transferred to Minna, Niger State to teach in the Police secondary school and took 11 year old Hewatch with her. Hewatch's family relocated to Ghana in 2005, where she was enrolled in the Graduate School of Management Studies to study Travel and Tourism and Hospitality Management. In 2006, on completing her certification exams, Hewatch decided to pursue her passion for acting.

She spent another year in Ghana trying to break into the entertainment industry to no avail, as most of the roles involved speaking the local dialect. In 2007, she returned to Nigeria, to continue pursuing her passion for acting.

== Career ==
Bearing a semblance to fellow Nollywood actress, Mercy Johnson; the acting skills of both are described as being similar. she claimed that sometimes she gets insulted due to her semblance to Mercy Johnson. Hewatch's first break came in the television series Cross Roads produced by Emeka Ossai. In 2010 she starred as the lead, starring alongside Desmond Elliot, in the first but adjudged failed science fiction/futuristic film, Kajola, directed by Niyi Akinmolayan. The film was not well received in Nigerian cinemas.

In 2011, she went on to star as ‘Keche’ the lead role, in Two Brides and a Baby alongside OC Ukeje, Stella Damasus-Aboderin, Chelsea Eze and Okey Uzoeshi. Hewatch attributes her flair for acting to having come from being inspired by the children of The Sound of Music after watching it for the first time at the age of 5.

In 2012, she was nominated as the best new actress for the Golden Icon Academy Awards (GIAMA).

She works with a charity organization, ‘The wings of love foundation’, which focuses on helping widows, orphans and young people getting off the streets and building a life for themselves.

== Filmography ==
Year	Film	Role	Notes
2010	Kajola	Police Chief Yetunde	with Desmond Elliot
2011	Two Brides and a Baby	Ketche	with Stella Damasus-Aboderin
2012	Lekki Wives Season 1	Peace Nwosu	TV series with Kiki Omeili
2013	In The Music	Ihuoma Ugu	with Omawumi, Chelsea Eze
2013	Murder at Prime Suites	Agent Hauwa Uthman	with Joseph Benjamin (actor), Chelsea Eze
2013	Lies Men Tell	Jackie	with Uche Jombo, Desmond Elliot
2014	Lekki Wives Season 2	Peace Nwosu	with Kiki Omeili
2014	After The Proposal	Lisa	with Uche Jombo
2014	The Perfect Plan	Beatrice	with Ini Edo, Joseph Benjamin (actor)
2014	Couples Game	Lina Dike	with Seun Akindele
2015	Lekki Wives Season 3	Peace Nwosu	with Kiki Omeili
2015	In The Name of Trust	Joy Omorogbe	with IK Ogbonna, Deyemi Okanlawon Fifty Kate
2022	The Anomalous	Dr. Oluchi Ikenna	with Clem Ohameze
2023	She's Having A Baby	Mercy	with Jacob Achihim
2024	Taken too Far	Jumoke	Drama
2024	Downright Fondness	Abigail	with Ray Emodi
2024	We Are Family	Ebere	TV Series 8 episodes

== See also ==
- List of Nigerian actors
