= Usifo =

Usifo is a surname. Notable people with the surname include:

- Alex Usifo (born 1953), Nigerian actor
- Maria Usifo (born 1964), Nigerian athlete
