= Moms at War =

2018 Nollywood film directed by Omoni Oboli

- Directed by: Omoni Oboli
- Written by: Naz Onuzo
- Produced by: Moses Babatope
- Starring: Yul Edochie; Eucharia Anunobi; Funke Akindele
- Distributed by: Film One Distribution
- Release date: 2018
- Running time: 91 minutes
- Country: Nigeria
- Language: English
- Box office: NGN40,000,000

Moms at War is a 2018 Nigerian comedy drama film directed by Omoni Oboli. It stars Funke Akindele as well as Michelle Dede, the former of whom won an award for her role as Best Actress in a Comedy (Movie/TV Series) at the 2020 Africa Magic Viewers' Choice Awards.

The film is a collaboration between Inkblot, FilmOne, and Dioni Visions. It was premiered in August 2018 at the Filmhouse Cinemas in Lekki, Lagos. It was released on August 17, 2018.

== Synopsis ==
It tells the story of two mothers who compete against each other to ensure success in the lives of their children, particularly in a scholarship competition.

Omoni Oboli says she was inspired to write and direct the movie because of her own childhood experiences.

== Cast ==
- Omoni Oboli
- Funke Akindele
- Yul Edochie
- Eucharia Anunobi
- Michelle Dede
- Sharon Ooja
- Alvin Abayomi
- Bukola Oladipupo
