= Murder of Cynthia Okogosu =

2012 murder in Nigeria

- Date: July 21, 2012
- Location: Lagos, Nigeria
- Type: Rape, Theft, Murder
- Burial: September 7, 2012; Delta State; Nigeria
- Convicted: Okwumi Echezona Nwabufor; Ejike Ilechukwu Olisaeloka.
- Trial: August 27, 2012 – March 23, 2017
- Verdict: Guilty
- Convictions: Murder
- Sentence: Death

Cynthia Udoka Osokogu was a Nigerian woman who was stalked on Facebook, lured from her residence in Abuja to a Lagos hotel under the pretext of business, then drugged, tied up, robbed, raped, beaten and strangled to death in 2012.

== Background ==
Cynthia was born on 10 November 1987 in Agbor town, Delta State. Cynthia Osokogu was the last child and only daughter of her parents, retired major-general Frank Osokogu and Joy-Rita Nkem Osokogu. She had three elder brothers. Her eldest brother is Flight Lieutenant Kenneth Uchechukwu Osokogu. Her immediate elder brother is an Assistant Superintendent of Customs, Williams Ehiedu Osokogu. Her third elder brother, Tony Azubike Osokogu, lived in Greece. She started schooling at the Command Children School, Ilorin and moved to the Command Secondary School, Jos from 1997 to 2004. She was a graduate of English Language at Nasarawa State University and was pursuing a master's degree in Public Administration in the same institution after resigning from a job with MTN. Cynthia was also a former model. She owned a boutique 'Dress Code' which she opened in Keffi, a town in Nasarawa State in 2007. She was described as hardworking, loving and industrious by her family. She had achieved much by age 24.

== Incident ==
Cynthia had established contact with two men through Facebook and BlackBerry Messenger over several months, believing them to be fellow retailers who offered to supply goods at lower prices.

In July 2012, she traveled from Abuja to Lagos to meet them regarding this business opportunity. After her arrival, the men escorted her from the airport to a hotel in Festac Town. According to court findings, she was later assaulted, robbed of personal belongings and business funds, and killed in the hotel room. The suspects subsequently left the hotel and attempted to sever online links with her. Hotel CCTV footage later assisted police investigations into the incident.

According to the testimony of the hotel receptionist, Ifeyinwa Njebu, the couple checked into the hotel on July 21, 2012, and later returned to the hotel in the early hours of July 22. After the man left the premises, he informed hotel staff that he would return to pay for an additional day and stated that his companion remained in the room.

When payment was not made and repeated attempts to contact the room received no response, hotel staff used a master key to enter the room. Njebu testified that she found the woman, later identified as Cynthia, unresponsive in the room and alerted the hotel manager, who subsequently contacted the police. CCTV footage was later reviewed by police, and Njebu identified two men in connection with the incident.

As the deceased’s identification documents and mobile phones were missing, her identity could not be immediately established, and her body was later deposited in a morgue in Lagos.

== Investigations ==
Cynthia Osokogu
- Born: Cynthia Osokogu; November 10, 1987; Nigeria
- Died: July 21, 2012 (aged 24); Lagos
- Cause of death: Asphyxiation from strangulation.
- Occupations: student, businesswoman

All this time, unaware of Cynthia's murder, her family and friends were praying for her safe return. Meanwhile, Cynthia's mother, Osokogu, tried calling Cynthia's cell phone for five days but her phone was switched off. On the seventh day, she recalled that one of the men picked her call and told her that Cynthia was sick. Not too long afterwards, they implied that Cynthia had been kidnapped and asked her mother for 20 million Naira ransom. Cynthia's mum asked them if they killed her daughter and they said no, she was just sick and couldn't come to the phone. The phone call was traced to Festac. There, her missing person's police report was submitted to the Area E Command in Festac. This enabled her family to trace her body to the morgue and also led them to the hotel. The police in Lagos delayed the release Cynthia's body to her parents for burial because they had intended to carry out an autopsy on the body at the Ikeja General Hospital morgue. Police Commissioner Umaru Manko revealed that the pathologist was still working on the autopsy which was ongoing at the time she was identified. Eventually, her body was released for burial and she was laid to rest in her hometown. A ceremonial burial was performed at the family residence in Boji-Boji Owa, Ika North Local Government Area of Delta State after a requiem mass. The Governor of Delta State, Emmanuel Uduaghan condoled with the Osokogu family and called on the police to conclude investigation quickly and bring the culprits to book. After Cynthia's murder and investigations progressed through cell phone records and CCTV footages, the police arrested the suspects.

=== Crime scene ===
Cynthia's body was found naked with her two hands tied behind her back with a brown tape and supported with a padlocked chain; her two legs were also taped together. Her mouth was stuffed with hair net and handkerchief, also tied with brown tape round her head to seal her mouth and secure the materials inside. There were pin-point holes in her white eyes as well as inside the upper part of her airways and surface of her lungs, a condition described as ‘petechial hemorrhage'. The pathologist also revealed that Cynthia had suffered pulmonary Oedema, an overweight of the lungs from being soaked by blood. Her left and right lungs weighed 400 and 500 grams respectively due to "blood accumulation”, noting that the normal weight would be 250 to 350 grams. The final autopsy stated that Cynthia was asphyxiated; suffocated to death through blockage of air into her lungs. Apart from her death resulting from asphyxia, the pathologist, John Oladapo Obafunwa also observed that she had multiple bruises and abrasions suspected to be from biting. Her autopsy further revealed that a dose of ‘Rohypnol’ sold to the suspects by a pharmacist, Osita Orji, was not responsible for Cynthia's death. After the arrest, several other women came forward to reveal that they had also been drugged, tied up and robbed by the suspects, but they all survived to tell the story. According to reports, these two young men also confessed that they had robbed several other women prior to Cynthia who happened to be their sixth victim. The gang reportedly specializes in luring unsuspecting young women, robbing them of their possessions before killing them. Although there were speculations that their motive was ritualistic, it appeared that it was greed and their main goal was to rob and kill. The specific reason Cynthia was killed was not fully established. The police proposed some theories; Perhaps, the suspects became enraged at the lack of payday after spending so much money to get her there. Or, probably, Cynthia struggled or attempted to scream even after being drugged with the sedative Rohypnol. "She was struggling to see how she could liberate herself or make noise in order to attract people to rescue her"; The investigating officer, FESTAC Area Commander, Dan Okoro said, "But they overpowered her." The police also stated that it was very likely that the culprits targeted her as they believed she would be carrying large amounts of cash. She was targeted, because the suspects had figured out that she was the daughter of a retired Army general. They assumed that she would come to Lagos with big cash, a large bank account and jewellery. "At some point they discovered that she came from a very good home and felt that they could make some quick money out of her." But her elder brother, Kenneth, stated that Cynthia never carried any large sums of cash and she never even had an ATM card, she used a checkbook. Several other men were arrested in connection with the crime including the pharmacist who sold the Rohypnol to the suspected killers without a prescription, their driver who always accompanied them during their robberies and a "fence"— the man who sold Cynthia's and the other victims goods.

== Trial ==
About one month after Cynthia was laid to rest, the trial commenced at Yaba Magistrate court, Lagos on August 27, 2012. Six people were arrested at the beginning of the investigation, they included: Olisaeloka Ezike, 23, and Okwuno Nwabufor, 33; both of whom were identified as the Facebook friends. Others were Osita Orji, the pharmacist who sold Rohypnol to them and Nonso Ezike, Olisaeloka's brother who assisted in selling the deceased's Blackberry phone. The six-count charge of conspiracy, murder, armed robbery, rape, “unlawful administration of obnoxious substance” and “forceful administration of obnoxious substance” with a view to causing bodily harm were read to them. The trial commenced with the prosecution, the Lagos State Government calling its first witness. Okwumo Nwabufo and Olisaeloka Ezike were charged with conspiracy to commit murder and felony. Orji Osita, a pharmacist, was charged with negligently selling the Rohypnol Flunitrazepan tablets to Ezike, the 2nd defendant, without a doctor's prescription and without showing due care. Nonso Ezike (Nwabufo's younger brother) was charged with being in possession of the three stolen blackberry mobile phones belonging to the late Cynthia Osokogu. All the accused initially pleaded not guilty to all six counts. Justice Olabisi Akinlade of the Lagos High Court sitting at Igbosere admitted as evidence, confessional statements of the culprits recorded in a video. When the first defendant was arrested, he confessed that he knew what he did and that everything was over. The first defendant then operated the Blackberry phone to reveal the chain used in tying his victim. The first defendant was arrested on August 20, 2012, after which he made the confessional statement. The Attorney General of Lagos State, Ade Ipaye, prosecuted the murder suspects, revealing details of pictures from the crime scene in the court from a laptop. The witness added that he and his team followed the first defendant to his home in Festac and recovered the said laptop, along with some phones and various network SIM cards. On that same date, the first defendant was asked to open the laptop, which he carried by himself to the Area Commander's office. "Pictures of the deceased lying down and her international passport lying on her chest was revealed”, the witness said. Another prosecution’s witness testified that from his investigation, it was discovered that the fourth defendant (Nonso) received different stolen phones from the first and second defendants on three occasions. The fourth defendant stole somebody’s receipt in Ladipo Market which he used in selling the deceased’s phone to someone in Port Harcourt and the person was arrested. The witness also told the court of another investigation against the defendants, in two separate hotels- Chelsea Suit and Penny Hotel, Festac, where they were alleged to have carried out similar acts. The cases were separated because the incidents did not happen on the same day. It was based on the confessional statement by the first and second defendants that they carried out similar acts in other hotels in Festac. In one of his appearances in court, Nwabufo denied ever knowing about Rohypnol nor did he put it into Cynthia’s drink. He also claimed that Cynthia was his lover and that they were planning to get married before her death. Nwabufo said he met her at Shoprite Mall in Lekki in 2011 where he went for shopping, while she was also shopping at a fashion shop, dismissing the allegations that they met on Facebook. He also added that when he met her, she was making inquires so he introduced himself to her and she did the same, adding that they exchanged contacts afterwards. He also said that they developed friendship after exchanging addresses and became very close since then. However, there has been no sufficient evidence to warrant this claim. The judge also dismissed the claim by Nwabufor that Osokogu was his fiancée and was going to introduce him to her father, saying that the "lover's" story was false because under cross-examination Nwabufor could not tell Cynthia's birthday, the name of her mother, her home town or, in fact, anything about her. Though the convicts pleaded not guilty and tried to withdraw the confessional statements they made to the police claiming they were made under duress, the court admitted the statements they made were corroborated by the testimonies of the witnesses and the evidence provided by the police. The judge said the fact that the police produced a video footage of the convicts making the confessional statements also helped in countering the claim by the convicts that they made the statements under duress. The court was satisfied that the confessional statements were not given under duress and admitted them in evidence. A confession is sufficient to gain conviction, the judge said. The confessional statement of the accused is consistent with the state of the body and consistent to the medical evidence. The judge said she would act on it accordingly. While delivering the judgement, the judge said the accused deserved the sentence as they were not remorseful of their action, and were telling the court lies after offering confessional statements to the police. The judge also found the duo guilty on three other counts and sentenced them to a total of 20 years imprisonment each. They were sentenced to 14 years in jail for conspiracy to commit murder, three years for conspiracy to commit felony by stealing, and three years for stealing a Blackberry phone. The judge acquitted and discharged Osita and Nonso. While delivering the judgement, Akinlade said she relied on the evidence and testimonies provided by the prosecution. She said, having carefully analysed the evidence and testimonies before the court, the prosecution proved beyond reasonable doubt that Messrs. Nwabufor and Ezike murdered Osokogu. The judge stated that the evidence of the prosecution remained uncontroverted and relies mainly on the testimonies of witnesses and evidence. It was also very clear that the first defendant was untruthful and deceived the court. In sentencing both men to death by hanging, the judge said it was no longer relevant to know who, between the two, actually killed Osokogu. The second defendant acted in consent with the first defendant and will bear the consequences of their action irrespective of whoever committed the offence. The Judge held that with its 10 witnesses and 17 exhibits, the prosecution's case against Nwabufo and Ezike was uncontroverted and that the circumstantial evidence brought by the state was “cogent, complete, unequivocal and compelling.” The judge held that the circumstantial evidence brought by the state in proof of the six counts of conspiracy, murder and stealing against the accused persons were cogent, complete, unequivocal and compelling. Counsel for Orji and Nonso had requested bail for their clients and Justice Akinlade had granted bail to Orji with two sureties. The court granted bail to Orji Osita and Ezike Nonso, while the other two who allegedly committed the offence of murder were remanded at the Kirikiri prison, Lagos. For Nonso, Olisaeloka's younger brother, the judge granted him bail with two sureties, adding that one of the sureties must be a civil servant not less than Grade Level 14 while the other must be a property owner with a genuine Certificate of Occupancy. On March 23, 2017, the Lagos state high court, Igbosere, sentenced Nwabufo and Ezike to death by hanging.

== Aftermath ==
Cynthia's murder exposed the dark side of the internet in a way that most people could not imagine. Her mother advised youths to be very cautious of making friends with people that they did not know. She stated “The youths should be very careful, especially when they are making friends in social media. Like we have seen in the case of my daughter, such friends may have ulterior motives." The police said the incident was a wakeup call to parents to become more vigilant about what their children are involved with while surfing the web. Stricter regulations were proposed for the Federal Government to enforce and restrict the sale of Rohypnol over the counter in Nigeria. The judge's final verdict lifted the hopes of some who had lost interest in the case. Cynthia's story inspired a film adaptation; Murder at Prime Suites, released in 2014.
