= Esther Audu =

Nigerian actress

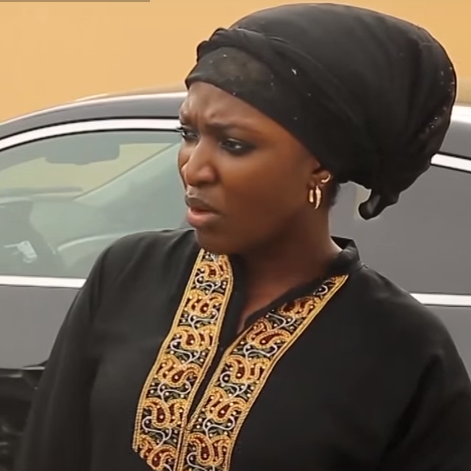
- Esther in Apartment 24
- Born: Esther James Audu; March 22, 1982 (age 44); Ikeja, Lagos State, Nigeria
- Education: University of Jos BA in Business Management
- Occupation: Actress
- Spouse: Philip Ojire

Esther Ene Audu (born March 22, 1982) is a Nigerian actress. She is popularly known for starring in the films Inikpi, Dinner (2016), Mystified (2017), and Order of the Ring (2013).

== Early life and education ==
Esther Audu was born on 22 March 1982 in Ikeja Lagos into the family of Mr. James Audu, a retired Military officer who served most of his service in Lagos and lived at the Ikeja Military Cantonment where Audu was born and her five other siblings. Audu is the youngest of six children of her family who were originally from Olamaboro of Kogi State. She had her primary and junior secondary schools in Lagos. In 2002, their family left Lagos for Abuja, and in Abuja, she completed her secondary school education and then secured admission to study Business Management at the University of Jos, Plateau State in 2006. She then graduated with a BA Business Management in 2010. She is married to Philip Ojire, a video director.

== Career ==
Esther started her acting career since secondary school; she said to be a newscaster was her dream. At secondary school she was a member of Drama and Literary clubs where she participated in stage dramas. However, in 1996, she was among those selected to represent Nigeria at kidafest in Ghana and from there her passion for acting started to grow hence dropping her dream of being a newscaster. She first starred in a lead movie role entitled: Ungodly romance and Sins of Rachael in Jos by Alex Mouth which she said were the earliest movies that helped launched her career fully into Nollywood. However, Audu, an undergraduate, was still participating in movies while studying. She featured in a movie entitled: Fatal Mistake Norbert Ajagu, in a sub lead role.

== Personal life ==
Esther is married to Philip Ojire, a serial entrepreneur and the founder of Freak Vault.

== Filmography ==
Year	Film	Role	Notes
2008	Hidden Treasure	Steph	
2009	Behind a Smile	Jenny	
2010	Best Interest		
2011	Two Hearts		
2012	The Kingdom	Judith	
2013	Return of The Ring	Melody	
2014	Burning Bridges	Terry	
2015	The Injury	Tessy	
2016	Dinner	Lady at the Airport	
2017	Mistified	Thelma	
2018	Black Day	Mercy	
2019	Close Friends	Rose	
2020	Omoge	Tasha	
2021	Accursed	Oluchi	
2022	Oath Keepers	Sandra	
2023	Lost in the Act	Mandy	

== Awards and nominations ==
Year	Award	Category	Film	Result	Ref
2017	Best of Nollywood Awards	Best Actress in a Lead role –English	Inikpi	Nominated	
