= What Lies Within =

- Theatrical Release Poster
- Directed by: Vanessa Nzediegwu
- Screenplay by: Paul Utomi
- Produced by: Paul Utomi; Tope Tedela; Vanessa Nzediegwu
- Starring: Michelle Dede; Paul Utomi; Kiki Omeili; Ebele Okaro; Okey Uzoeshi; Vanessa Nzediegwu; Ken Erics; Odenike; Tope Tedela
- Cinematography: Tunji Akinsehinwa
- Edited by: Vanessa Nzediegwu
- Music by: Ava Momoh
- Production companies: A Cool Story Picture; Cornucopia Productions; Veeblu Productions
- Release date: 8 September 2017
- Running time: 103 Minutes
- Country: Nigeria
- Language: English

What Lies Within is a 2017 Nigerian drama thriller film directed by Vanessa Nzediegwu and starring an ensemble cast of Michelle Dede, Paul Utomi, Ebele Okaro, Kiki Omeili, Okey Uzoeshi, Vanessa Nzediegwu, Ken Erics, Odenike and Tope Tedela. The film was written by Paul Utomi. What Lies Within was shot on location in Lagos, Nigeria.

== Premise ==
What Lies Within chronicles 24 hours in the life of a happily married woman and her pregnant sister-in-law who are unwittingly thrust into the center of an incident that could have far reaching consequences on their lives and those of their loved ones.

== Cast ==
- Michelle Dede as Fiona
- Paul Utomi as Barry
- Ebele Okaro as Mama
- Kiki Omeili as Miss Dimeji
- Okey Uzoeshi as Derrick
- Vanessa Nzediegwu as Ireti
- Ken Erics as Brian
- Odenike as Esther
- Tope Tedela as Gboyega
- Yaw as Yaw

== Production ==
Principal photography began in August 2015. The first poster for the film was released on May 25, 2016. A teaser trailer for the film was released in July 2017 while an extended trailer was released in August 2017.

== Awards and nominations ==
Year	Award	Category	Recipient(s)	Result	Ref.
2017	Best of Nollywood Awards	Best Actor in a Lead role –English	Paul Utomi	Nominated	
2017	Best of Nollywood Awards	Best Actress in a Lead role –English	Michelle Dede	Won	
2017	Best of Nollywood Awards	Movie with the Best Screenplay	What Lies Within	Nominated	
2017	Best of Nollywood Awards	Movie with the Best Special Effect	What Lies Within	Nominated	
2017	Best of Nollywood Awards	Movie with the Best Editing	What Lies Within	Won	
2017	Best of Nollywood Awards	Movie with the Best Cinematography	What Lies Within	Nominated	
2017	Best of Nollywood Awards	Movie of the Year	What Lies Within	Won	
2017	Best of Nollywood Awards	Director of the Year	Vanessa Nzediegwu	Won	
