= The Silent Baron =

2021 Nigerian action drama film

- Directed by: Richard Omos Iboyi
- Produced by: Ifeanyi Ukaeru
- Starring: Ejike Asiegbu, Sani Muazu, Ngozi Nwosu, Nancy Isime, Enyinna Nwigwe, Anthony Munjaro, and Doris Ifeka
- Production company: Ekwe Nche Entertainment Limited
- Release date: 24 June 2021
- Running time: 99 minutes
- Country: Nigeria
- Language: English

The Silent Baron is a 2021 Nigerian action drama film produced and directed by Ifeanyi Ukaeru and Richard Omos Iboyi in collaboration with the National Drug Law Enforcement Agency under the production company of Ekwe Nche Entertainment Limited to celebrate the United Nations Day Against Drug Abuse and Illicit Trafficking. The film stars Ejike Asiegbu, Sani Muazu, Ngozi Nwosu, Nancy Isime, Enyinna Nwigwe, Anthony Munjaro, and Doris Ifeka.

== Synopsis ==
Anselm is a drug dealer who employs young ladies in his illicit drug trafficking business. He deceitfully lures a lady into a relationship only to use her as a courier. Anselm encounters Frank, a highly disciplined NDLEA officer saddle with the responsibility of making sure that Nigeria is not decertified by the American Drug Administration as a result of increased flow of drug activities.

== Cast ==
- Adunni Ade
- Anthony Monjaro as Frank
- Enyinna Nwigwe as Anselm
- Jibola Dabo
- Nancy Isime as Anita
- Ngozi Nwosu as Mama Bola
- Doris Ifeka
- Ejike Asiegbu
- Priscilla Okpara
- Sani Mu'azu

== Premiere ==
The film premiered on 26 June 2021, the United Nations Day Against Drug Abuse and Illicit Trafficking, at Silverbird Entertainment Centre, Abuja. In attendance were Vice President Yemi Osinbajo, Chairman of the National Drug Law Enforcement Agency, Buba Marwa. Adamawa North Senatorial District representative Senator Ishaku Abbo, member representing Adamawa Central Senatorial District Senator Aishatu Dahiru Ahmed (Binani), Director-General of the National Council For Arts and Culture, Otunba Olusegun Runsewe, former chairperson of the Economic and Financial Crimes Commission (EFCC) Farida Waziri and Secretary of NDLEA, Barrister Shedrack Haruna.
