= Sylvia (2018 film) =

2018 Nigerian film

- Directed by: Daniel Oriahi
- Written by: Vanessa Kanu
- Produced by: Ekene Som Mekwunye
- Starring: Chris Attoh; Zainab Balogun; Ini Dima-Okojie; Udoka Oyeka; Ijeoma Grace Agu; Bolaji Ogunmola; Lord Frank
- Cinematography: Kaghor Crowther Idhebor
- Edited by: Jude Chidebe
- Music by: Michael "Truth" Ogunlade
- Production company: Trino Motion Pictures
- Distributed by: Trino Motion Pictures
- Release date: 21 September 2018
- Running time: 104 minutes
- Country: Nigeria
- Language: English
- Box office: ₦6,364,366

Sylvia is a 2018 Nigerian supernatural thriller film directed by Daniel Oriahi, written by Vanessa Kanu, and produced by Ekene Som Mekwunye for Trino Motion Pictures. The film was screened at Nollywood Week in Paris on 5 May 2018 and was released in cinemas on 21 September 2018.

== Plot ==
Richard Okezie decides to leave Sylvia, his lifelong imaginary friend and lover for Gbemi a flesh-and-blood real woman, but complications arise when Sylvia decides to destroy Richard's peaceful life.

== Cast ==
- Chris Attoh as Richard Okezie
- Zainab Balogun as Sylvia
- Ini Dima-Okojie as Gbemi
- Udoka Oyeka as Obaro
- Ijeoma Grace Agu as Hawa
- Captain Coker as Little Richard
- Amina Mustapha as Little Sylvia
- Precious Shedrack as Teenage Sylvia
- Dumpet Enebeli as Teenage Obaro
- Ndifreke Josiah Etim as Teenage Richard
- Mohammed Abdullahi Saliu as Mr Hassan
- Omotunde Adebowale David (Lolo) as Mrs Iweta
- Lord Frank as Mr Temidayo Davies
- Bolaji Ogunmola as Nurse Karen
- Elsie Eluwa as Richards Mum

== Release ==
The film was first screened in May 2018 at Nollywood Week Paris. The official trailer was released on 6 August 2018. After a premiere at Terra Kulture on 16 September 2018, the film was released in cinemas on 21 September 2018.

== Critical reception ==
Sylvia received positive reviews from critics, with praise directed at its storyline, performances, cinematography, and themes.
Franklin Ugobude of PulseNG commended the performances of the lead actors and the film's score, highlighting its refreshing take on a familiar theme of spirituality that resonates with contemporary audiences.

Precious Nwogwu of MamaZeus called Sylvia "spellbinding" and praised its cinematography, casting, costuming, story, and locations, describing it as one of the best Nollywood films.

The Maveriq of Tha Revue described Sylvia as "one of the darkest thrillers" in Nollywood and acknowledged Trino Studios for its departure from traditional Nollywood productions.

Oris Aigbokhaevbolo in his feature review on BellaNaija, wrote: "It was heartening to have the origin of the spirit-spouse be broached but never really explained. The film shows it is the product of a Nigerian mind in how the existence of the spiritual realm is taken as a given, and its characters are modern figures wrestling ancient myths, citified kids fighting what we think of us as village people".

== Accolades ==
=== Film festivals ===
Date	Festival
5 May 2018	Nollywood Week Paris
23 May 2019	Africa Film Trinidad and Tobago

List of award nominations
Award	Category	Recipients and nominees	Result
Africa Film Academy (14th Africa Movie Academy Awards)	Best Young/Promising Actor	Zainab Balogun	Nominated
Africa Magic Viewers' Choice Awards (2020 Africa Magic Viewers' Choice Awards)	Best Actress in a Drama	Zainab Balogun	Nominated
Africa Magic Viewers' Choice Awards (2020 Africa Magic Viewers' Choice Awards)	Best Writer Movies/ TV Series	Vanessa Kanu	Nominated
Golden Movie Awards (2019 Golden Movie Awards)	Golden Actor in Drama	Chris Attoh	Nominated
Golden Movie Awards (2019 Golden Movie Awards)	Golden Actress in Drama	Zainab Balogun	Nominated
Golden Movie Awards (2019 Golden Movie Awards)	Golden Supporting Actress in Drama	Ini Dima-Okojie	Nominated
Golden Movie Awards (2019 Golden Movie Awards)	Golden Movie Drama	Sylvia (Ekene Som Mekwunye)	Nominated
Golden Movie Awards (2019 Golden Movie Awards)	Overall Golden Movie	Sylvia	Nominated
Golden Movie Awards (2019 Golden Movie Awards)	Golden Sound Editor	Michael Ogunlade	Nominated
Golden Movie Awards (2019 Golden Movie Awards)	Golden Editor Video	Jude Chidebe	Nominated

== See also ==
- List of Nigerian films of 2018
