= The Anomalous =

American television series

- Genre: Drama
- Created by: Chuk Otakpor; Richard Odilu
- Written by: Richard Odilu; Chuk Otakpor; Tunray Femi; Jesurobo-Owie Gift Imafidon
- Directed by: Chinedu Omorie
- Starring: Keira Hewatch; Michael Uchegbu; Frankincense Eche-Ben; Clem Ohameze; Ronnie Dikko; Ifeanyi Kalu; Felix Ugo Omokhodion; Azizat Sadiq; Ogee Nelson; Lucy Ameh; David Jones
- Theme music composer: Ava Momoh
- Country of origin: United States
- Original language: English
- No. of series: 1
- No. of episodes: 4

Production
- Executive producers: Chuk Otakpor; Richard Odilu
- Producers: Richard Odilu; Chuk Otakpor; Alero Okorodus; Jesurobo-Owie Gift Imafidon
- Production locations: Lagos, Nigeria
- Cinematography: Adeoluwa Owu
- Editor: Lawrence Agbetsise
- Camera setup: Single-camera
- Running time: 45–50 minutes

The Anomalous is an American television series created, co-written, and executive produced by Chuk Otakpor and Richard Odilu for CeeRO World Productions. Set in Lagos, The Anomalous is a television drama that follows the professional practice of two young psychologists, Dr. Kelenna (Michael Uchegbu) and Dr. Oluchi (Keira Hewatch), a husband and wife team – whose own demons are brought to the fore while striving to help others face theirs.

== Plot ==
Dr. Kelenna (Michael Uchegbu) and Dr. Oluchi (Keira Hewatch) are behavioral psychotherapists confronted with mostly bizarre clinical cases that put their skills on trial while trying to grow their relatively young business in an environment that seldom defies logic. Having worked hard and successfully in separating their business and personal life, the fabric holding it together comes apart at the seams with one wrong move creating a domino effect.

== Cast and characters ==
- Michael Uchegbu as Dr. Kelenna Ikenna, a psychologist and husband to Dr. Oluchi Ikenna.
- Keira Hewatch as Dr. Oluchi Ikenna, a psychologist and wife to Dr. Kelenna Ikenna.
- Frankincense Eche-Ben as Yemi Adelaja, Drs. Oluchi and Ikenna's client
- Clem Ohameze as Dr. Chukwudi Ikenna, Dr. Kelenna's father
- Ronnie Dikko as Mrs. Adelaja, Yemi's mother
- Ifeanyi Kalu as Chinedu Obajuru, Drs. Oluchi and Ikenna's client and a media consultant
- Felix Ugo Omokhodion as Eghosa, Drs. Oluchi and Ikenna's client
- Azizat Sadiq as Ehi, Drs. Oluchi and Ikenna's client and boutique owner
- Peace Oni as Aisha, Drs. Oluchi and Ikenna's Assistant
- Lucy Ameh as Freda, Ehi's older sister
- Stephen Damian as Ojimaojo, Ehi's ex-boyfriend
- Dan Ugoji as Williams, Ehi's boyfriend
- Ogee Nelson as Tito, Eghosa's ex-girlfriend
- Genny Uzoma as Chibundu Obajuru, Chinedu's sister
- Rita Edward as Mama Eghosa, Eghosa's mother
- Bryan Okoye as Ebuka, Yemi's friend
- David Jones as Barrister Bello Osagie
- Roxy Antak as Victor, Eghosa's best friend
- Emmanuel Ilemobayo as Jallo, Victor's best friend
- Bridget Chigbufue as Interviewer
- Genoveva Umeh as Young Oluchi
- Chimezie Imo as Young Ekene, Young Oluchi's cousin and best friend
- Hakeem Rahman as Papa Ade, Eghosa and Mama Eghosa's cantankerous neighbor
- Emeka Okoye as Prophet Bedazzle
- Bukky Thomas as Mama Ade, Papa Ade's wife
- Isioma Momah as Nkemdilichukwu, Chinedu's cousin
- Joy Nmezi as Abebe, call girl

== Release ==
The series will premiere on 17 July 2025.

=== Accolades ===
The first season of the series has received eight nominations and eight wins in some film festivals. It is in the Best Series category at the Skiptown Playhouse International Film Festival, 2020 which will take place in June, 2021. Also, it received three nominations at the New Vision International Film Festival, Amsterdam for Best Actress (Keira Hewatch), Best Actor (Michael Uchegbu) and Best Series. It won the September award for Best Pilot at the Cyrus International Film Festival of Toronto, 2020, and the September, 2020 award for Best Episodic at Phoenix Monthly Short Film Festival.

Michael Uchegbu was awarded the Best Actor at Hollywood International Golden Age Festival, 2020 September edition. At the November 2020 edition of the Indie Short Fest Los Angeles Film Festival the series was nominated for Best Web Series/TV Pilot, Best Original Score, Best Costume Design, and Best Makeup and Hairstyling, and it won for Best Original Score and Best Makeup and Hairstyling. Also, Indie Fest awarded the series Award of Recognition in African-American Film, Television - Pilot Program, and Television - Program/Series at its 2020 Indie Fest Film Awards.
