= Murder at Prime Suites =

2013 Nigerian crime thriller

- Theatrical poster
- Directed by: Eneaji Chris Eneng
- Written by: Chris Eneaji
- Produced by: Jumafor Ajogwu
- Starring: Joseph Benjamin; Chelsea Eze; Keira Hewatch
- Cinematography: Joseph Oladunjoye
- Edited by: Shola Ayorinde
- Music by: Dumebi
- Production companies: C&C Screen Production Company
- Release date: 30 August 2013
- Running time: 120 minutes
- Country: Nigeria
- Language: English

Murder at Prime Suites (M@PS) is a 2013 Nigerian crime thriller film directed by Chris Eneaji Eneng starring Joseph Benjamin, Keira Hewatch and Chelsea Eze. The movie was inspired by a much publicized similar murder that occurred in Lagos. The film stars Joseph Benjamin and Keira Hewatch.

== Plot ==
When Florence Ngwu (Chelsea Eze) is gruesomely murdered in a hotel by an unknown culprit, Agent Ted (Joseph Benjamin) is sent in to investigate the circumstances that led to her death and make sure that justice prevails.

== Cast ==
- Joseph Benjamin as Agent Ted
- Keira Hewatch as Agent Hauwa
- Chelsea Eze as Florence Ngwu
- Okey Uzoeshi as Jide Coker
- Stan Nze as Adolf
- Alex Mouth as Hacker

== Reception ==
Reactions to the film varied from mixed to positive, with Sodas and Popcorns giving it a 3 out of 5 average score and stating "It’s a nice movie, its different, its creative, but some screws seemed a bit loose which didn’t make the experience any better than this for me."

The film received nominations at the 2014 Africa Magic Viewers' Choice Awards in the categories Best Movie (Drama) and Best Sound.

== See also ==
- List of Nigerian films of 2013
