= Something Wicked (2017 film) =

2017 Nigerian film

- Directed by: Yemi Morafa
- Produced by: Okey Uzoeshi and Isioma Osaje
- Starring: Gabriel Afolayan, Iretiola Doyle, Ivie Okujaye, Adesua Etomi, Beverly Naya and Okey Uzoeshi
- Production companies: Jack of Aces, Agency 106, Film Boyz and FilmOne Distribution
- Release date: 2017
- Country: Nigeria
- Language: English

Something Wicked is a 2017 Nigerian movie co-produced by Okey Uzoeshi and Isioma Osaje and directed by Yemi Morafa under the production companies of Jack of Aces, Agency 106, Film Boyz and FilmOne Distribution. The movie stars Gabriel Afolayan, Iretiola Doyle, Ivie Okujaye-Egboh, Adesua Etomi, Beverly Naya and Okey Uzoeshi.

== Synopsis ==
The movie revolves around a widow and her orphaned nephew. While her nephew who moved into her house is having difficulty in coping with the new family, she is having difficulty in maintaining her business and single parenthood.

== Premiere ==
The movie was premiered across cinemas in the country on February 17, 2017.

== Cast ==
- Ireti Doyle
- Okey Uzoeshi
- Gabriel Afolayan
- Beverly Naya
- Ivie Okujaye
- Adesua Etomi
- Omowumi Dada
- Bisola Aiyeola
- Timini Egbuson.
