= One Lagos Night =

2021 Nigerian crime comedy film

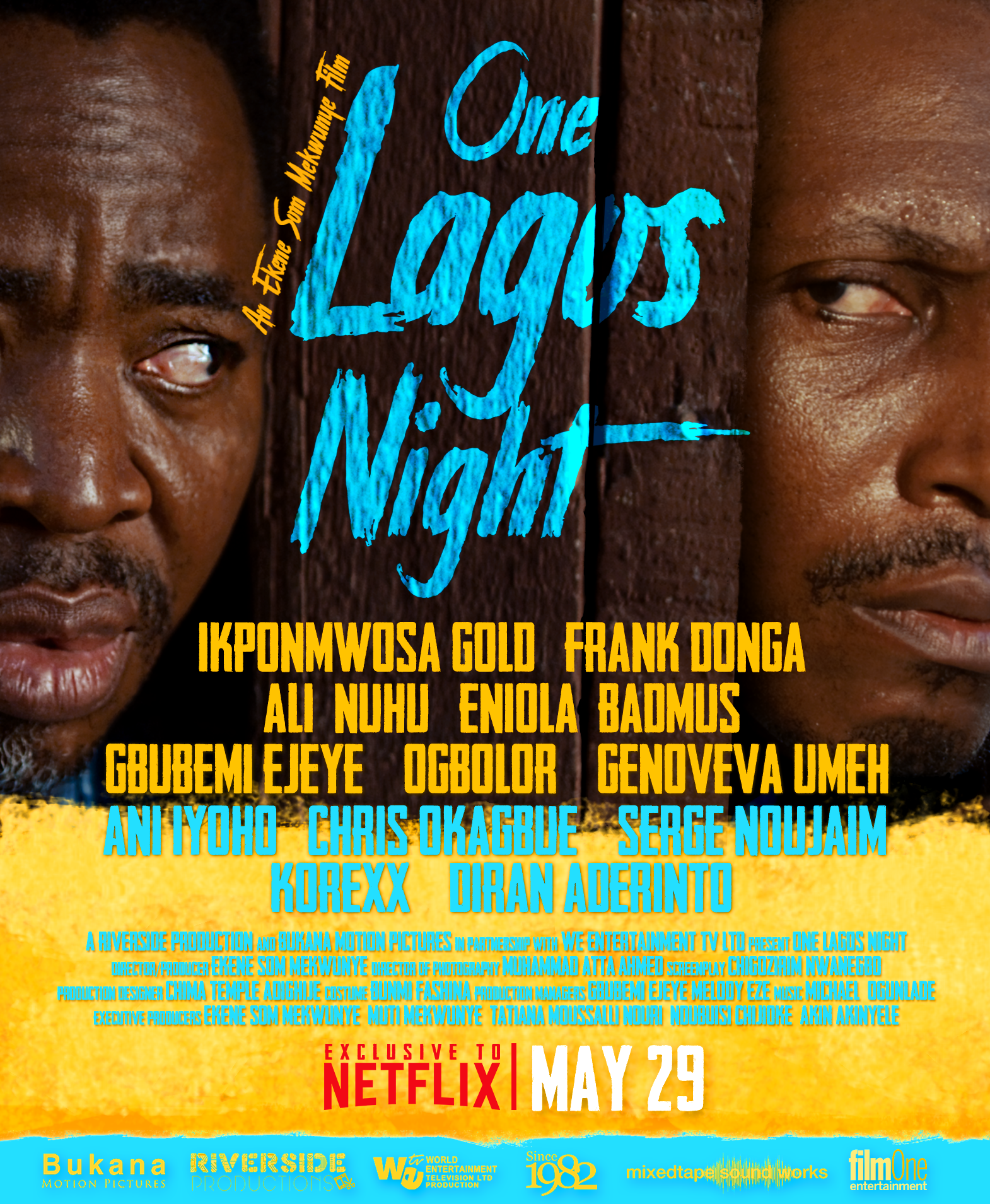
- Film poster
- Directed by: Ekene Som Mekwunye
- Written by: Chigozirm Nwanegbo, Ekene Som Mekwunye
- Produced by: Ekene Som Mekwunye,
- Starring: Frank Donga; Ikponmwosa Gold; Eniola Badmus; Ali Nuhu; Genoveva Umeh; Ogbolor; Ani Iyoho; Gbubemi Ejeye; Akorede 'Korexx' Ajayi; Diran Aderinto; Chris Okagbue
- Cinematography: Muhammad Atta Ahmed
- Edited by: Pascal Dakwoji, Muhammad Atta Ahmed
- Music by: Michael ‘Truth' Ogunlade
- Production company: Bukana Motion Pictures / Riverside productions
- Distributed by: FilmOne Entertainment
- Release date: 29 May 2021
- Running time: 102 minutes
- Country: Nigeria
- Language: English

One Lagos Night is a 2021 Nigerian crime comedy film set in Lagos. It was directed and produced by Ekene Som Mekwunye. That same year in 2021, it was rated as one of the 10 top Nigerian movies on Netflix rankings website.

== Cast ==
- Eniola Badmus as Uloma
- Ali Nuhu as Radiant
- Frank Donga as Tayo
- Ikponmwosa Gold as Ehiz Obaseki
- Ogbolor as Scorpion
- Chris Okagbue as Poison
- Genoveva Umeh as Anita
- Ani Iyoho as Killer
- Diran Aderinto as Viper
- Gbubemi Ejeye as Ada
- Lynda Ada Dozie as Bisoye
- Akorede Ajayi as Police Officer
- Serge Noujaim as Greg
- Judith Ijeoma Agazi as Lady
- Yetunde Taiwo as Boss Woman
- Alex Ayalogu as Ekanem
- Chima Temple Adighije as Man

== Release and reception ==
It first screened at the Nollywood Week, Paris on 10 May 2021. It was one of the 9 officially selected feature films to screen at the international film festival where it was allotted the closing film slot at the film festival. After that, Netflix acquired the exclusive rights to the film where it premiered on the platform on 29 May 2021. It received great reviews from critics like Filmrats.
