= Felix Ugo Omokhodion =

Nigerian actor, model and filmmaker

Felix Omokhodion
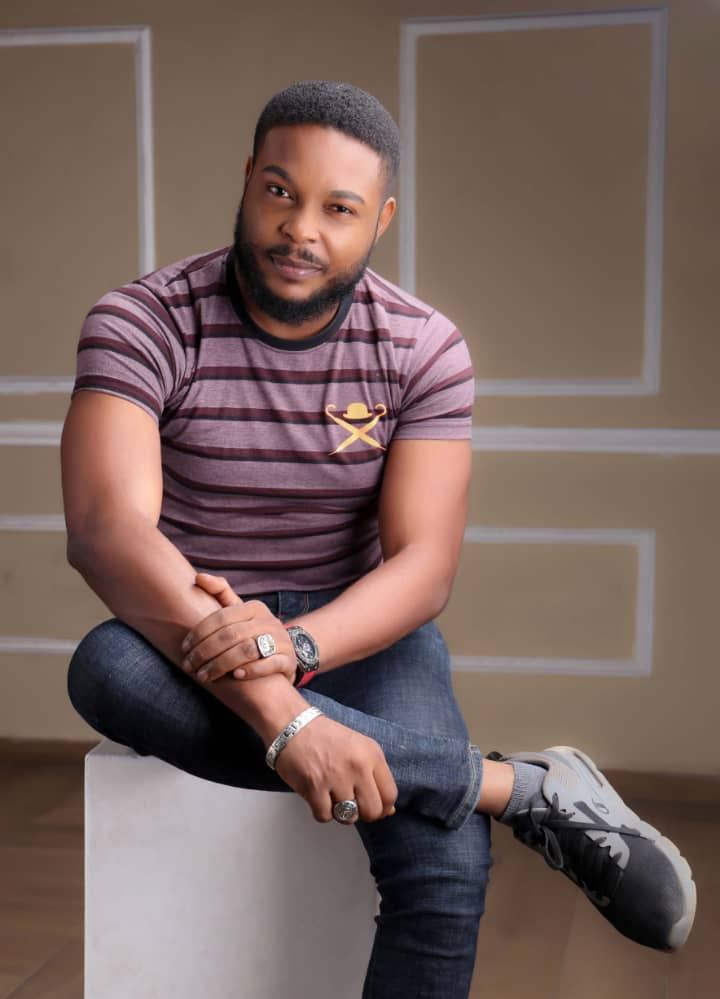
- Born: Felix Ugo Omokhodion; 27 April 1986 (age 40); Lagos, Nigeria
- Education: Lagos State University; Lees Strasberg Film Institute
- Occupations: Actor, Model and Filmmaker
- Years active: 2006–present
- Parents: Felix Omokhodion (father); Victoria Obiageli (mother)

Felix Ugo Omokhodion (born 27 April 1986) is a Nigerian actor, model and filmmaker. He is best known for his role in the 2006 Tajudeen Adepetu produced television series One Love, as well as his portrayal of the character Tubosun in the movie Celebrity Marriage, which also co-starred Tonto Dikeh, Jackie Appiah, Kanayo O Kanayo, Odunlade Adekola, Toyin Abraham and Roselyn Ngissah, for which he was nominated as Best Supporting Actor Male at the Zulu African Film Academy Awards 2018, which held in the United Kingdom.

== Early life ==
Omokhodion was born in Lagos Island, Nigeria on 27 April 1986. He was born to a Flight Captain father, Felix Omokhodion from Edo State and his mother Victoria Obiageli Nwughala from Imo State. At the age of three, his parents separated, and he grew up with his mother in a single parent home. He is the first child of his father and the only child of his mother. Omokhodion had his primary school education at M&K Nursery and Primary School, Ojodu Lagos, during which time he had begun to show interest in acting and show business, as he would often act out roles with imaginary cast members, while in school. Omokhodion Studied Computer Science at the Lagos State University, Ojo Lagos and went on to study Method Acting at Lees Strasberg Film Institute Los Angeles, CA.

== Career ==
While at the University, Omokhodion began his modelling career and took part in campaigns for Coca- Cola, Haier Thermocool, MTN, and a few other notable Nigerian brands. He got his first screen role as an extra in a Movie Love In Totality, starring Yomi Black and Omotola Jalade Ekeinde. In 2006, Omokhodion attended an audition for a role on a new AIT Television series titled One Love produced by Tajudeen Adepetu and he was cast in his first major role as "Biodun", a role which he went on to play for seven years alongside Tony Umole, Vivian Anani and Joshua Richard.

Omokhodion went on to play prominent roles in other television series including The Maze directed by Acho Yusuf, Bella's Place Produced by Deborah Odutayo, Portraits of Passion co-starring Blossom Chukwujekwu, Emerald produced by Dapo Ojo, Thirty Minutes Produced by Dapo Ojo and written by Biodun Stephen, Super Story's Corporate Thieves Produced by Wale Adenuga of WAP TV, EbonyLife's Short Series Madam Sarah's House Produced by Mo Abudu, and NECTAR Produced by Sola Sobowale.

In 2016, after a decade of starring predominantly in television series, Omokhodion began starring in full-length feature films, which began with the 2016 movie, The Engagement. He went on to feature in other notable films including the successful Box office hit, Celebrity Marriage. His portrayal of the character James in the movie Things I Hate About You co-starring Jackie Appiah, Calista Okorokwo got him nominated in the category of Best Actor African Movie Collaboration in the 2018 edition of the Ghana Movie Awards.

In February 2020, Omokhodion released his debut feature film production on his newly launched film production company, FPF Productions titled Muddled in cinemas across Nigeria. The movie starred several notable Nigerian actors including Kunle Remi and Belinda Effah and was directed by Best Okoduwa

== Awards and recognition ==
Year	Event	Prize	Recipient	Result
2015	Nigerian Models Achiever Awards	Fast Rising Model/Actor of the Year	Felix Ugo Omokhodion	Nominated
2018	City People Entertainment Awards	Most Promising Actor for the year	Felix Omokhodion	Nominated
2018	City People Entertainment Awards	Best New Actor of the Year	Felix Omokhodion	Nominated
2018	Ghana Movie Awards 2018	Best Actor African Collaboration	Felix Omokhodion (Things I Hate About You)	Nominated
2018	Zulu African Film Academy Awards (United Kingdom 2018)	Best Supporting Actor - Male	Felix Omokhodion (Celebrity Marriage)	Nominated
2019	Best of Nollywood (BON) Awards	Revelation of the Year	Felix Ugo Omokhodion	Won
2022	Nigeria Achievers’ Awards	Best Actor of the Year	Felix Ugo Omokhodion	Won
2023	Coal City Film Festival Awards	Best Lead Act	Felix Ugo Omokhodion	Won

== Filmography ==
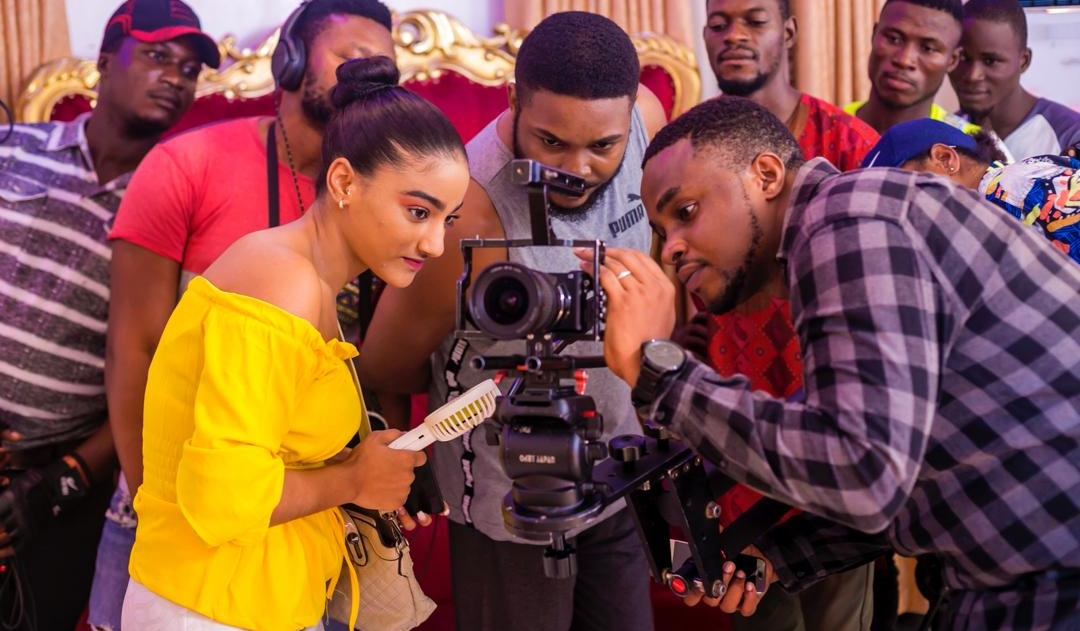
Felix Ugo Omokhodion (centre) on the set of Try Again

=== Television series ===
Year	Title	Role	Director	Notes
2008 - 2012	One Love	Biodun(Lead)	Kingsley Omoefe	Lead Role/TV Series produced by Tajudeen Adepetu
2008	The Maze	Bryan(Lead)	Achor Yusuf	TV series
2012 - 2015	Two Sides Of a Coin	Eche	Daniel Ademinokan and Damijo Efe Young	Sub-Lead/TV Series
2014 - 2016	Nectar	Bayo	Tunde Olaoye	Sub-Lead/TV Series
2015	Super Story - Corporate Thieves	Osas	Bolaji Dawodu	Sub-Lead/Series
2015	Growing Old		Chris Eneaji	TV series
2013 - 2015	Echoes		Dickson Dzakpasu	TV series
2013 - 2015	Bella's Place	Johnson	Greg Odutayo	TV series
2015	Madam Sarah's House		Dickson Dzakpasu	EbonyLife TV series
2016	Tomorrow is Now		Tunde Olaoye	Drama series
2016	Boiling Point		Victor Okpala	Lead Role/TV Series
2017	Thirty Minutes		Dapo Ojo	Lead Role/TV Series
2018	Holy Grail		Innocent Chukwuma	TV series
2020	The Anomalous	Eghosa	Chinedu Omorie	TV series

=== Feature films ===
Year	Title	Role	Director	Notes
2016	The Engagement		Ubong Bassi	Lead role
2016	My Love Alive		Chinedu Ben	Lead role
2016	Things I Hate About You	James	Pascal Amanfo	Lead role
2017	Women	Desmond	Chidox	Lead role
2017	Inner Enemy		Wilson Chibututu	Lead role
2017	Strange Affection	Justin	Ubong Bassey Nya	Lead role
2017	Secret Safe With Me		Innocent Chukwuma (One Soul)	Lead role
2017	Bad Market	Detective	Innocent Chukwuma (One Soul)	Sub Lead
2017	Therapist's Therapy		Innocent Chukwuma (One Soul)	Sub Lead
2017	Subterfuge		Cyril Jackson	Lead, released under Irokotv
2017	Celebrity Marriage	Tubosun	Pascal Amanfo	
2017	The Quest	Detective	Dimeji Ajibola	
2017	The Code	Lawyer	Cyril Jackson	Lead role
2017	The Chronicles	Mbaka	Caliph Uzar	
2017	The Monitor	Doctor	Izzy Films	
2017	Prodigal Daughters		Victor Okpala	Sub Lead
2018	Dark Chronicles	Cameo	Best Okoduwa	
2018	Desires and Deceit		Uche Okereke	Sub Lead
2018	Till Mum's Do Us Part		Ubong Bassey Nya	Sub Lead
2018	Dead Silent		Anara Nnachi	Lead
2018	Second Woman		Richards OmosIboyi DGN	Sub Lead
2018	House 69		Emma Anyaka	Lead
2018	Lucky Number One		Chidox	Lead
2018	Inferior		Sunshine Olawore	Lead
2018	Smooth Operator		Ubong Bassey Nya	Lead
2018	Wasted		Emma Olabode	Lead
2018	Longest Day		Prince Iyke Olisa	Lead
2018	24hrs to My Wedding		Emma Olabode	Lead
2018	Because I Loved You		Ndifreke Mathew Andy	Lead
2018	A Fighting Chance	Nonso	Bishop Nwabunze	Sub Lead
2018	Arabella		Chinonso Aniebonam	Sub Lead
2018	Karen's Flaws			Sub Lead
2018	What A Woman Wants	Samuel	Emma Olabode	Lead
2018	Atema	Prince Rappor	Simi Opeoluwa	Lead
2018	Secret Twins		Emma Anyaka	Sub Lead
2018	Truce		Chuks Ejiofor	Lead
2018	Untold		Foa Films	Lead
2018	Lisa's Code		Paul Igwe	Lead
2018	Unfriendly	Izu	Uche Okereke	
2018	Shaded Night		Femi Despy Akinsolotu	Lead
2018	Amoral		Paul Igwe	Lead
2018	Sade		Sunshine Olawore	Lead
2019	Intimacy	Desmond	Sunshine Olawore	Lead
2019	Ruby		Chidox	Lead
2019	Random Hearts		Chidox	Lead
2019	Ray of Hope		Sadiq Sule	Lead
2019	A Trap Inbetween		Uchechi Okereke	Cameo
2019	A Step Downwards		Aderick Media	Sub Lead
2019	Power of Virtue		Bigstan Okoro	Lead
2019	Envisage		Chinonso Charles	Lead
2019	Ocean of tears		Sunshine Olawore	Lead
2019	Shola's Diaries	Debo	Yinka Sam-Aina	Sub Lead
2019	HellMary		Paul Igwe	Lead
2019	Killing Victor's Wife	Victor	Eric Aghimien	Lead
2019	THORN APART		Chuks Ejiofor	Lead
2019	Final Destination	Ifeanyi	Sesan Alabi	
2020	Muddled	Jordan	Best Okoduwa	
2021	Porbeni	Mayowa	Biodun Stephen	
2022	Out of Control	Tayo	Emmanuel Anyaka	
