= The Therapist (film) =

2021 Nigerian drama film by Kayode Kasum

- Directed by: Kayode Kasum
- Produced by: Onome Odometa; Esse Odometa
- Starring: Toyin Abraham; Rita Dominic; Michelle Dede
- Production company: Hedge Productions
- Distributed by: Genesis Pictures
- Release date: 26 March 2021
- Country: Nigeria
- Language: English

The Therapist is a 2021 Nigerian drama film directed by Kayode Kasum. The film stars Rita Dominic, Michelle Dede, Toyin Abraham in the lead roles. The film was released on 26 March 2021.

== Synopsis ==
The story is based on a woman who has lost the happiness in her life after getting married and eventually obtains divorce from her abusive husband. She then offers voluntary help to other women in the society who also seek to obtain divorce from their abusive, disloyal and unfaithful husbands.

== Cast ==
- Rita Dominic as Eloho Ojukwu
- Michelle Dede as Gari
- Toyin Abraham as Mrs. Priye
- Shafy Bello as Mrs. Bankole
- Tope Tedela as Rufus
- Anthony Monjaro as Fabian Ojukwu
- Saeed Balogun as Mr. Priye
- Ada Ebere as Golden
- Anee Icha as Dumebi
- Chidi Mokeme as Rotimi Bankole
- Esse Odometa as Edna
- Chukwuemeka Nwosu as Lawyer
- Blessing Onwukwe as Mrs. Ogene
- Jane Robinson as Interviewer
- Ijenebe Azubuike as Waiter
