= Paul Utomi =

Nigerian actor and film director (born 1981)

- Born: Paul Chibuzo Utomi-Biyang; 6 October 1981 (age 44); Madrid, Spain
- Citizenship: Nigerian, Equatoguinean
- Education: Lagos State University
- Occupations: Actor; film director; writer; voice-over artist; producer; model
- Years active: 2011-present
- Known for: Lekki Wives, O-Town, What Lies Within, Country Hard, The Reckoner
- Website: https://about.me/paulutomi

Paul Chibuzo Utomi-Biyang (born 6 October 1981) is a Nigerian actor, film director, producer, writer, voice-over artist and model.

== Early life and education ==
Utomi was born to Mr and Mrs Utomi-Biyang in Madrid, Spain. His family moved back to Lagos, Nigeria, when he was one year old. He attended Comfort Nursery and Primary School in Lagos and proceeded to Legacy High School in Akowonjo, Lagos, where he completed his secondary education. He studied economics at Lagos State University, after which he studied acting and directing at the Centre for Film and Video Excellence in 2011.

== Career ==
=== Acting ===
Before acting, he wrote for a sports publication called The Game Magazine and presented several episodes of AM Express Sports on NTA Network.

He joined the Nigerian movie industry (Nollywood) professionally and began his professional acting career, making his first appearance playing the lead character in the TV series Tarima, which aired circa 2012. The following year, he starred in the TV series Lekki Wives, in which he played the character, Jude.

== Directing and producing ==
In 2017, he co-produced a drama thriller film titled What Lies Within, which won "Best Feature Film" and "Best Overall Picture" at the Abuja International Zuma Film Festival 2017, along with four accolades won at the Best of Nollywood Awards the same year.

His debut feature film as a director, Country Hard, gained recognition when it was selected to showcase at the 10th edition of AFRIFF in 2021.

Utomi's third feature film as a director is the action fantasy film The Reckoner, released in 2021, in which Baaj Adebule plays the lead role.

== Filmography ==
Title	Genre	Role	Year	Reference
Lekki Wives	TV series	Actor	2013	
Shuga	TV series	Actor	2013	
Gidi Up	Web series	Actor	2014	
Apostates	Short film	Actor	2014	
O-Town	Crime film	Actor	2015	
In My Father's House	Short film	Actor	2015	
B Negative	Short film	Actor	2015	
Leeway	Short film	Actor	2016	
Heaven	Short film	Actor	2016	
What Lies Within	Short film	Actor, writer, co-producer	2017	
Dognapped	Comedy	Actor	2017	
Living Close to You	TV series	Actor	2018	
Hush	TV series	Actor	2018	
E.V.E	TV series	Actor	2018	
Crossroads	Short film	Actor	2020	
This Lady Called Life	Feature film	Actor	2020	
Tinsel	TV series	Actor	2020	
Juju stories: Yam (Love Portion)	Film	Actor	2021	
Country Hard	Film	Actor	2021	
Finding Hubby	Drama film	Actor	2021	
Clinically Speaking	Film	Actor	2022	
One Too Many	Film	Actor	2022	
Iyanu: Dawn of Thunder	Animated series	Actor	2023	
Love and Light	TV series	Actor	2023	
The Leaders of Tomorrow	TV series	Actor	2023	
The Two Aishas	Film	Actor	2023	
Relationshits	Film	Writer, director, producer	2015	
Country Hard	Crime drama film	Writer, director, producer	2021	
The Reckoner	Film	Director	2021	
Mumu MAN	Film	Director	2023	
Omo Awo	Film	Director	2023	
Say Who Die	Film	Director	2025	

== Awards and nominations ==
Year	Award ceremony	Category	Film	Result	Ref
2017	The African Film Festival (TAFF)	Best Actor Award	Family	Won	
2017	Best of Nollywood Awards	Best Actor in a Leading Role (English)	What Lies Within	Nominated	
2017	Best of Nollywood Awards	Movie of the Year Category	What Lies Within	Nominated	
2017	Best of Nollywood Awards	Best Screenplay Category	What Lies Within	Nominated	
