= Heart & Soul (Nigerian TV series) =

2020 Nigerian TV series

- Written by: Obi Emelonye
- Directed by: Obi Emelonye
- Country of origin: Nigeria
- Original language: English language

Production
- Producer: Obi Emelonye

Original release
- Release: 2020

Heart & Soul is a 2020 medical TV series about how ailment can be treated physically alongside spiritual. It was produced, written, and directed by Obi Emelonye.

== Cast ==
- Chioma Adibe as Matron
- Ademola Amoo as Dr Sydney
- Odun Ayo as Mary
- Phoenix Ezendu as Udoka
- Anthony Monjaro as Dr Aloysius
- Joy Nmezi as Miriam
- Ifeanyi Onehuba as Lyk
- Femi Onasoga as Jude
- Ijeoma Richards as Dr Regina

== Plot ==
A medical doctor who just got back from the UK to treat patients which require spiritual intervention as well.
