= 2017 Best of Nollywood Awards =

Award ceremony

- Date: 17 December 2017
- Location: Abeokuta, Ogun State
- Country: Nigeria
- Hosted by: Rahama Sadau and Gbenro Ajibade

The 2017 Best of Nollywood Awards was the 9th edition of the ceremony and took place in Abeokuta, Ogun State on 17 December 2017. The event was co-hosted by Rahama Shadau and Gbenro Ajibade.

The nominee list was released in September 2017 with Omotola Jalade-Ekehinde, Mercy Aigbe, and Alex Ekubo identified as the "top contenders". About 120 films were considered including 113 feature films, 7 short films and 2 TV shows.

Awards were given in 32 categories, with Adesua Etomi, Beverly Naya, Gabriel Afolayan and Alex Ekubo amongst the winners. The lifetime achievement awards for special contribution to the development of Nollywood was given to Omotola Jalade-Ekiende, Ali Nuhu and filmmaker, Lancelot Oduwa Imasuen.

== Awards ==
Best Actor in a Lead role –English	Best Actor in a Lead role –Yoruba
•* Bolanle Ninalowo – Picture Perfect • Sambasa Nzeribe – Slow Country • Alexx Ekubo – Inikpi • Joseph Benjamin – Dance to my Beat • Gabriel Afolayan –Tatu • Paul Utomi – What lies Within	•* Niyi Johnson – Okun • Gabriel Afolayan – False Flag • Femi Adebayo – Afaila Ojo • Odunlade Adekola – Gangan • Abdulateef Oladimeji – Ojo Meta
Best Actor in a Lead role –Hausa	Best Actor in a Lead role –Igbo
• Rabiu Rikadawa – Ko Bayan Raina • Adam Zango – Matatace Shaida	•* Tim Ebuka – Akuko Uwa • Browny Igboegbu – Nkoli Nwa Nsukka
Best Actress in a Lead role –English	Best Actress in a Lead role –Yoruba
•* Michelle Dede – What lies Within • Omotola Jalade Ekeinde – Alter Ego • Ivie Okujaye – Slow Country • Ufuoma McDermott – The Women • Rahama Sadau – Tatu • Esther Audu – Inikpi	•* Jumoke Odetola – Somewhere in the Dark • Ronke Odusanya – Ailatunse • Aisha Lawal – False Flag • Mercy Aigbe – Ojo Meta • Adeola Ayoade – Okun
Best Actress in a Lead role –Hausa	Best Actress in a Lead role –Igbo
• Jamila Nagudu – Ko Bayan Raina • Rahama Sadau – Matatace Shaida	•* Chizzy Alichi – Akuko Uwa • Rachel Okonkwo – Nkoli Nwa Nsukka
Best Supporting Actor –English	Best Supporting Actress –English
•* Kelechi Udegbe – Behind the Wheels • IK Ogbonna – Excess Luggage • Tope Tedela – Slow Country • Segun Arinze – Tatu • Sambasa Nzeribe – Tatu • Justice Nuagbe – Dance to my Beat • Ushbebe – Dance to my Beat	•* Kate Henshaw/ Omoni Oboli/Katherine Obiang – The Women • Queen Nwokoye – Excess Luggage • Bayray Mcnwizu – Trace • Bisola Aiyeola – Picture Perfect • Toyin Abraham – Tatu • Funlola Raimi – Tatu
Most Promising Actor	Most Promising Actress
•* Suara Olayinka – Tatu • Peter Jacobs – I AM	•* Chisom Steve – Akuko Uwa • Tinuola Oladoye – I AM
Best Supporting Actor –Yoruba	Best Supporting Actress –Yoruba
•* Gabriel Afolayan – Ailatunse • Tobiloba Abraham – Okun • Taiwo Ibikunle – Afaila Ojo • Abdulateef Oladimeji – 1983 • Wale Akorede – Somewhere in the Dark	•* Ireti Osayemi – Ojo Meta • Feyisara Hassan – Okun • Omowumi Dada – Somewhere in the Dark • Iyabo Ojo – Gangan • Temitope Solaja – Ashabi Akata
Best Child Actor	Best Child Actress
•* Adebayo Thomas – Slow Country • Dumebi Nzeribe – Tatu • Kunuji Boluwatife – The Maniac • Abayomi Gabriel – Excess Luggage • Ero Josh-Behind – Wheels	•* Teniola Awobiyi – Tatu • Martina Obi – Truncated • Bella Ufondu – Excess Luggage
Best Comedy of the Year	Best Movie with Social message
[[A Trip to Jamaica| •* A Trip to Jamaica]] • Ufuoma • Three Wise Men • Excess Luggage • American Driver	•* Behind the Wheels • False Flag • Alter Ego • Busted
Movie with the Best Special Effect	Movie with the Best Screenplay
•* Behind the Wheels • Slow Country • Oloibiri • Misery Lane • Somewhere in the Dark • Goddess of Fire • What lies Within	•* The Women • Okun • Oloibiri • Tatu • What Lies Within • Slow Country
Best Short Film	Best Documentary
•* Aramide • Truncated • Mustapha • I AM	
Best TV Series of the Year	Movie with the Best Editing
•* The Johnsons • Zone 222	•* What Lies Within • Tatu • Slow Country • The Women • Okun
Movie with the Best Soundtrack	Movie with the Best Production Design
•* Stormy Heart • Oloibiri • Tatu • Inikpi	•* Oloibiri • Tatu • Okun • Inikpi • Alter Ego
Movie with the Best Cinematography	Best Use of Nigerian Costume in a Movie
•* A Trip to Jamaica • Tatu • Slow Country • What Lies Within • Oloibiri	•* Okun • Picture Perfect • Tatu • Inikpi • The Women
Best Use of Make up in a Movie	Movie of the Year
•* Slow Country • Somewhere in the dark • Tatu • Picture Perfect	•* What Lies Within • Slow Country • Okun • Tatu • Oloibiri
Director of the Year	Best Kiss in a Movie
•* Vanessa Nzediegwu – What lies Within • Eric Aghimien – Slow Country • Blessing Egbe – The Women • Bogunmbe Abiola Paul – Okun • Don Omope – Tatu	•* Ronke Odusanya/Gabriel Afolayan – Ailatunse • Omowunmi Dada/Eddie Watson – Bias • Daniel K. Daniel/Chelsea Eze – Scorned • Ufuoma McDemott/Kalu Ikeagu – The Women • Omotola Jalade Ekeinde /Kunle Remmy – Alter Ego
Revelation of the Year –male	Revelation of the Year –female
•* Timini Egbuson • Abayomi Alvin • Baaj Adebule	•* Yvonne Enakhene • Regina Daniel • Bimbo Ademoye • Selia Adebowale • Folahunsho Adeola
Best Use of Nigerian Food in a Movie	Lifetime Achievement Award
•* Picture Perfect • Ufuoma • Trace • Stormy Heart	•* Omotola Jalade-Ekiende •* Ali Nuhu •* Lancelot Oduwa Imasuen
