= Lekki Wives =

Nigerian TV Drama series

- Genre: Drama
- Written by: Blessing Effiong Egbe
- Directed by: Blessing Effiong Egbe
- Country of origin: Nigeria
- Original language: English
- No. of seasons: 3

Production
- Producer: Blessing Effiong Egbe
- Production locations: Lagos, Nigeria

Lekki Wives is a Nigerian television drama series written, produced, and directed by Blessing Effiong Egbe. It stars Katherine Obiang, Kiki Omeili, Keira Hewatch-Peace, Adaora Ukoh and Chinonso Young. It ran for three seasons from 2012 to 2015.

== Synopsis ==
The story follows five women living in the heart of Lekki, a high-brow area in Lagos known for wealth, power, and flamboyant lifestyles. It portrays issues related to living in the Lekki axis. It tells their individual struggles behind the front of attractiveness. Uju tries desperately to keep up with the joneses in order to have the semblance of a successful life. Despite getting all it takes to be identified as a "Lekki babe", her fake lifestyle comes to the fore. Miranda's home front is troubled, as she is married to a man living with disability, and her sexuality is hidden. She serves as her family's ticket out of poverty. Cleopatra is married off by her parents to a 72-year-old chief, whose wealth elevates them out of poverty. The marriage is devoid of love and care, which leads her to engage in an extramarital affair. Loveth is desperate to acquire material things, leading her to have an affair with her landlord, thereby destroying her marriage. She also has an affair with her friend's husband. Peace is a born-again, Bible-wielding wife who ignores her husband’s sexual needs. He, in turn, falls prey to Loveth.

== Cast ==
=== Main cast ===
- Kiki Omeili as Loveth
- Keira Hewatch as Peace
- Adaora Ukoh as Miranda
- Chinonso Young as Cleopatra
- Katherine Obiang as Uju

=== Supporting cast ===
- Bayray Mcnwizu
- Sylvya Oluchy
- Bobby Michaels
- Kachi Nnochiri

== Production and release ==
During the shooting for season 2, the cast camped in a hotel for four weeks in order to avoid Lagos traffic. Ghanaian actress Joselyn Dumas joined the cast for season 2 of the show.

A premiere ceremony was held in Manchester in March 2014, while the DVD release was announced in December 2015.

== Reception ==
In a review by Vanguard, it was noted that "aside from the noticeable characterization and continuity flaws, this production manages to be exceptional in its delivery and depth".

Lekki Wives was described as "a takeoff on the Desperate Housewives theme". It was rated "B" by XploreNollywood.
