= Okey Uzoeshi =

Nigerian actor

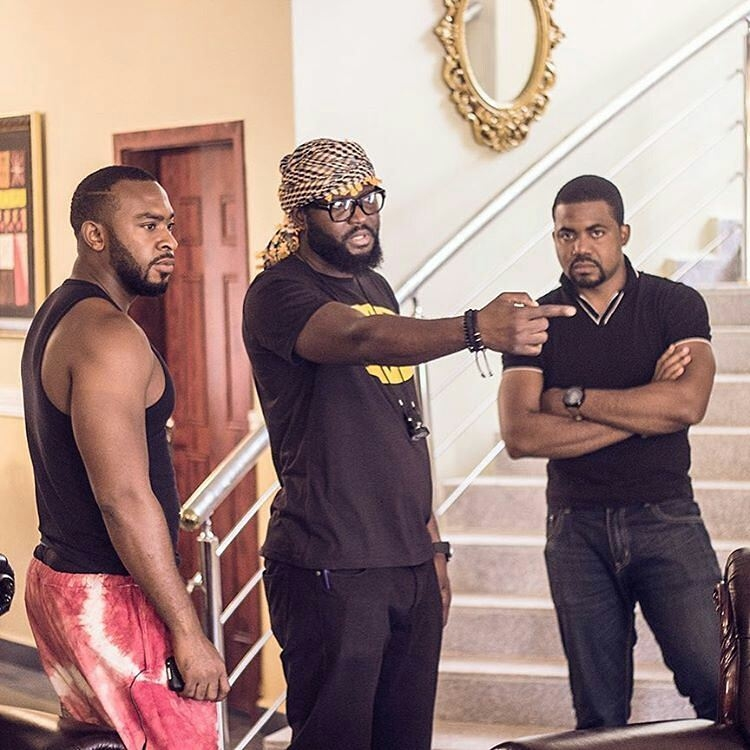
- Born: April 8, 1983 (age 42); Imo State
- Education: Federal Polytechnic, Nekede
- Occupation: Actor
- Known for: Something Wicked, Couple of Days, Life of a Nigerian Couple

Okey Uzoeshi is a Nigerian actor and musician. He is known for his roles in Two Brides and a Baby, Blood in the Lagoon, Love and War, Something Wicked and Couple of Days.

== Early life and education ==
He was born on April 8, 1983, in Imo State. He attended Birrel Avenue High School for his post primary education and attended Federal Polytechnic Nekede Owerri for his post-secondary education

== Career ==
He started his career as a musician before he ventured into acting where he made his debut in a movie called Fatal Imagination. Since then, he has featured in several family and advocacy movies such as something Wicked, Strain, Couple of Days and others.

== Award and nominations ==
He has received nominations from the Best of Nollywood Awards (BON), Golden Icons Academy Movie Awards (GIAMA), and the African Movie Academy Awards (AMAA).

== Filmography ==
- Fatal Imagination
- Sweet Tomorrow (2008) as Efe
- Two Brides and a Baby (2011) as Maye
- Alan Poza (2013) as Kokori Oshare
- Murder at Prime Suites (2013) as Jide Coker
- Life of A Nigerian Couple (2015) as Emeka
- A Long Night (2015) as GM
- Blood in the Lagoon (2015) as George Dibiya
- Couple of Days (2016) as Dan
- Green White Green (2016) as Chuks
- Dinner (film) (2016) as Mike Okafor
- Something Wicked (2017) as Abel
- What Lies Within (2017) as Derrick
- Public Property (2017)
- Battleground (African Magic Series) (2017) as Ola Badmus
- Strain (2020) as Nnamdi Ezeji
- The Sessions (2020) as Ejiro
- Blood Sisters (2022) as Winston
- The Cook (2023) as Gabriel
- Aces of Hurt (2023) as Ugo
- Wedding Night Blues (2024) as Dr. Badmus
