= Yomi Black =

Nigerian actor

- Born: Abayomi Aderibigbe; 13 October 1982 (age 43); Lagos, Lagos State, Nigeria
- Occupations: Actor, photographer, film-maker
- Years active: 2011 – present

Abayomi Aderibigbe professionally known as Yomi Black is a Nigerian actor, and filmmaker, best known for his role as Sunday in the hit online comedy skit series Sunday & Lolade alongside Kiki Omeili, which made its theatrical debut as the first Nigerian comedy skit series to premiere at the cinemas.

== Career ==
Yomi Black started out as a Radio presenter for Rhythm 93.7 FM Lagos. He then went on to produce 15 editions of a shopping magazine, “Window Shopping Magazine”, after which he branched out into producing Movies, Comedy Skits, Documentary, Advertising, Shows, and Photography and by 2009, he had earned a reputation as a celebrity photographer.

In 2011 Yomi Black began producing a music review show called Radio Hit Show (RHS) with 160 successful episodes.

In 2013, he started his online TV platform on YouTube called VHS (Video Hit Show), a short form comedy series with over 200 videos produced and counting, it was on this platform that he began producing the critically acclaimed comedy skit, Sunday & Lolade featuring Kiki Omeili. In 2017, the series was adapted for the big screen and premiered in Nigerian cinemas nationwide, breaking the digital conventions that regulated its creation, making it the first Nigerian comedy skit to have a theatrical release.

In February 2018, Yomi Black announced that he had begun production of a 12-episode television series, Room 420 starring a host of notable Nigerian television and film stars including, MTV Shuga Naija star Timini Egbuson, Jide Kosoko, and Toni Tones.

== Personal life ==
In 2012, Yomi Black married Elizabeth John in Abuja. The two had met on the set of the season 2 of the Nigerian premiere business reality TV show, The Intern and hit it off. In 2021, it was reported that after nine years of marriage, the two had separated. They have a son together.

== Awards and recognition ==
In 2013, one of his comedy skits, Lagos Big Girls Games was listed as the 4th most watched video on Youtube in Nigeria. Yomi Black was also awarded the Vlogger of the Year at the 2016 City People Entertainment Awards.

== Filmography ==
=== Directorial credits ===
| Year | Title | Notes |
|---|---|---|
| 2013 | Lagos Big Girl Games | Youtube sketch |
| 2015 | Madame Ekaite’s Pant | Youtube sketch, garnered over 3 million views |
| 2015 | The Password | Skit with 130m views on Facebook |
| 2017 | Sunday and Lolade | Theatrical Release/Online Release (8 million views) |
| 2017 | Bandits | Feature film |
| 2018 | Room 420 | 12 episode TV series |
| 2018 | Jelili and Clit Oris | 13 episode TV series |
| 2018 | Come Chop with me naija | 13 Episode TV Reality show |
| 2022 | The Modern Woman | Feature film starring Sharon Ojoa and Timini Egbuson |

=== Production credits ===
| Year | Title | Notes |
|---|---|---|
| 2021 | Nkoyo (the series) | Directed by Seyi Babatope (13 episodes produced) |
| 2021 | Bad boys and Bridesmaids | Directed by Seyi Babatope |
| 2022 | Case Closed | TV series starring Alibaba and Lasisi Elenu |

=== Acting credits ===
| Year | Title | Notes |
|---|---|---|
| 2021 | Lockdown | Directed by Moses Inwang, _{featuring Omotola Jalade Ekeinde and Chioma Akpotha} |
| 2021 | Bad Comments | Produced by Jim Iyke |
