= Alex Usifo =

Nigerian actor (born 1953)

Alex Usifo Omiagbo
- Born: 16 April 1953 (age 73)
- Citizenship: Nigerian
- Occupation: Actor
- Years active: 1984 till present
- Notable work: End of the Wicked

Alexander Usifo Omiagbo (born 16 April 1953) is a Nigerian actor.

== Career ==
Usifo auditioned at several media organisations, including Radio Nigeria Lagos, Voice of Nigeria, and NTA Ilorin, but was not selected and remained unemployed for a period. On the invitation of his friend Peter Okun, Usifo attended a Deeper Life crusade, where he later said he was inspired to "look inwards".

His acting career began in 1984 with a role in the television film The Return of the Native. He subsequently took leading roles in Natas and Two People. He appeared in the NTA Victoria Island weekly series At Your Service and other productions, including Echoes of Life and Turning Wheel, between 1984 and 1987.

He gained wider recognition in 1988 for his role as the villain Talaab Abass in Zeb Ejiro's soap opera, Ripples.

Before the advent of Nollywood, Usifo participated in stage plays, including Awero and Ola Rotimi's Our Husband Has Gone Mad Again, staged at the National Theatre. He also featured in radio and film productions.

== Recognition ==
Usifo won awards locally and internationally, including:

- Best Actor - African Collaboration, RLG Ghana Movie Awards (2012)
- Best Actor (Ripples), Legends of Nollywood Awards
- AETV London and EHIGLAD Entertainment Presentation
- Lifetime Achievement Award, Nollywood Christian Fellowship (2012)
- Excellent Achievement in the Movie Industry, Niger Delta Awards (2009)
- Outstanding Achievement in Nollywood, Bells University Awards
- Award for Excellence in Artistic Creativity, Achievers' Intl. University and Educational Network
- Peace and Development Award, YELL/Advocacy Magazine & Partnership for Women and Justice (2013)
- Distinguished Award for Excellence, Rotaract Club of Sagamu
- Inspirational Award, United Nations Council of Churches & Ministerial Fellowship
- Award for Excellence and Exemplary Living, Omega Fire Ministries
- The Snapshots Award, Covenant Christian Centre
- Award of Recognition, Calvary Bible Church
- Bridge Builder Awards; Winners' Youth Ministry, Badagry
- Award for Leadership Excellence in Nollywood Movies, El Shaddai Ministries Intl.
- Nollywood Icons Award, Nigerian Film Corporation

== Filmography ==
- Silent Night (1996) as Stephen Odame
- Captive (1998)
- Endtime (1999)
- End of the Wicked (1999) as Beelzebub
- Executive Crime (2000) as Vice President
- Desperadoes (2001)
- My Love (2002)
- Lean on Me (2003)
- Dangerous Sisters (2004) as Festus
- Azima (2005)
- Final Point (2006)
- The Guilty (2006) as Odili
- Strong Men at Work (2007) as Tony
- Trumpet of Death (2007) as Ekene
- Who Am I? (2007)
- Classical Fraud (with Ufuoma Ejenobor)
- Kiss the Dust (2008) as Peter Uche
- Felicima: One Gift (2009) as Andrew
- Tango with Me (2010) as Uzo's father
- Lovelorn (2012)
- Okoro the Prince (2013) as Oba Ozuola
- Royal Mission (2015)
- Silence (2016)
- Code Wilo (2019)
- Enakhe (2020) as Osasere "Epa" Iwinosa
- Strain (2020) as Grandpa Ezeji
- Where Men Rule (2021) as Okonkwo
- Love & Justice (2022) as Cyril
- The Black Book (2023) as General Isa
- Home Coming (2023)
