= Angel Unigwe =

Nigerian actress (born 2009)

- Born: Divine-Angel Onyinyechi Unigwe; 27 June 2005 (age 21); Lagos, Nigeria
- Citizenship: Nigeria
- Occupations: Actress, model, presenter
- Years active: 2011–present

Angel Unigwe (born Divine-Angel Onyinyechi Unigwe; 27 June 2005) is a Nigerian actress, model, and presenter who has also featured in popular television commercials.

== Career ==
Introduced to the movie industry by her mum, Unigwe started as a child actor making her debut in 2015 after taking up roles in ‘Alison’s Stand,’ a popular Nigerian television series; and since then she has continued to warm the hearts of film audiences’.

== Filmography ==
Unigwe has played several dominant roles in no fewer than 30 films produced in Nigeria, an industry adjudged to be the second-largest in the world after Bollywood. Some of the films Unigwe has featured in include Woe Man, Everything in Between, Middle of Nowhere, Light in the Dark, Three Thieves, Ajoche, King of Boys, Code Wilo, Mute, Bereaved: Pains of Aliyah, My Siblings and I, Zuriel's Diary, City Crimes, Bobo A Rats Tale, Nigerian Trade, Ten years Married: Mirage, and Freedah.

In 2018, Unigwe starred in Light in the Dark, a movie produced and directed by Ekene Som Mekwunye that was released on 25 January the following year, featuring Joke Silva, Rita Dominic, Kalu Ikeagwu, Ngozi Nwosu, Saidi Balogun, Kiki Omeili, Nonso Odogwu, Big Mickey and Prince Unigwe among a host of others.

In 2019, Unigwe played Fuwe in “Three Thieves”, composed by the trio Sammy Egbemawei, Abba Makama, and Africa Ukoh. The movie released to the cinema in Nigeria on 4 October had Babtunwa Aderinokun and Uche Okocha as the executive producer and producer, respectively.

In 2021 Unigwe starred in the television series The Olive, released in May 2021 directed by Yemi Morafa and produced by Esse Akwawa and Chidinma Igbokweuche.

== Awards and nominations ==
Unigwe has received multiple nominations and awards throughout her career. In 2019, she was named Child Actor of the Year at the Intellects Giant Awards and won Best Young/Promising Actor at the Africa Movie Academy Awards (AMAA) held on 27 October 2019. She later received the Best Child Actress in a Movie award at the 2021 Best of Nollywood (BON) Awards for her performance in Strain. On 20 May 2023, she was honored with the TrailblazerAfrica Magic Viewers' Choice Awards.
