= Anthony Monjaro =

Nigerian actor and filmmaker

- Born: Anthony 'Monjaro' Akposheri; Nigeria
- Education: Thames Valley University, UK; Goldsmith College, UK
- Occupation: Actor

Anthony 'Monjaro' Akposheri is a Nigerian actor, model, and filmmaker. He played the role of the flight captain in the 2012 Nigerian thriller disaster film, Last Flight To Abuja. He is a native of Orogun town in Delta State, Nigeria.

== Education ==
Anthony Monjaro holds a B.Sc. degree in multimedia & film production from the Thames Valley University, UK. He also has a diploma in performing art for screen from Goldsmith College, UK.

== Career ==
Before moving to Nigeria, Anthony was a part-time actor working and living in the Uk. His first movie role in the Nigerian film industry was the role of the flight captain in the 2012 movie, Last Flight to Abuja. Following that, he played the character "OTTAH" in the daytime TV series, Tinsel.

== Filmography ==
- Last Flight to Abuja (2012) as Captain George
- Tinsel (TV series)
- Quicksand
- After The Proposal (2013) as Ken
- Gidi Up (2013 TV Series) as Meka
- +234 (2015 TV Series)
- 4-1-Love (2015) as Jasper
- The Duplex (2015) as Jones
- The First Lady (2015) as Prince
- Stalker (2016) as Dickson
- Happy Ending (2016) as Tave
- Remember Me (2016) as Tokumbo
- Lodgers (2016) as Usman
- One Room (2016) as Emeka
- Love Lost (2017) as Bala
- The Women (2017) as Maro Oghene
- Wetin Women Want (2018) as John
- Wife Beater
- Crazy Lovely, Cool (2018)
- The Millions (2019)
- Obey (2019) as Larry
- For Old Times' Sake (2019) as Richard Doyle
- Ordinary Couple (2019) as Kelvin
- Heart and Soul (TV Series) (2019) as Dr. Aloysius
- Super Sheroes (2020) as Paul
- The Twist (2020) as Bryan
- The Therapist (2021) as Fabian Ojukwu
- The Silent Baron (2021)
- Emotional Ripple (2022) as Charles
- Her Desire (2022) as Raymond
- Unbroken Bond (2023) as Tobi
- Husband Hustlers (2023) as Bolu
- Troublous Weekend (2024) as Ken
