= Ngozi Nwosu =

Nigerian actress (born 1963)

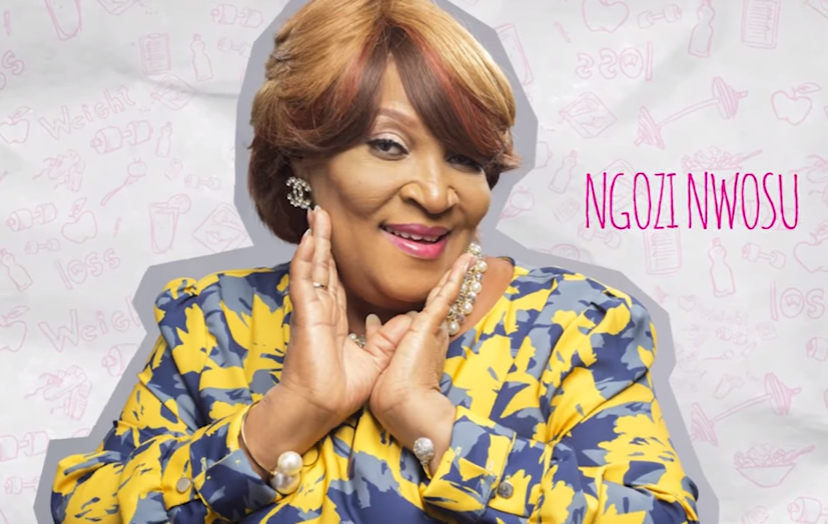
- Nwosu in Skinny Girl in Transit
- Born: 1 August 1963 (age 63); Nigeria
- Citizenship: Nigerian
- Occupation: Actress
- Known for: Ripples; Living in Bondage; Fuji House of Commotion

Ngozi Nwosu (pron.; born 1 August 1963) is a Nigerian actress and producer. She began her acting career in Yoruba-language films, before making her home-video debut in Living in Bondage, an Igbo-language film.

== Early life ==
Nwosu, a native of Arochukwu in Abia State, southeastern Nigeria, was born on 1 August 1963. She grew up in Lagos. Her father, a Biafran veteran, was killed during the Nigeria Civil War. Nwosu is fluent in Igbo, Yoruba, and English languages.

== Education ==
Nwosu had her primary education at St. Paul Anglican School, Idi Oro. She then proceeded to Maryland Comprehensive High School, Ikeja, and concluded her high school at East Rosary High School. Her professional acting training under the leadership of Reverend Fabian Oko was done at Royal Theatre Art Club School.

== Career ==
Nwosu began her acting career while attending acting classes in school, most of which were done in Yoruba. She played "Madam V boot" in the television series Ripples. While on set in Living in Bondage, Nwosu is attributed as being the first actress to kiss on set during her romantic session with Kenneth Okonkwo. She is also known for playing "Peace" in sitcom, Fuji House of Commotion (created by Amaka Igwe). Her character was the second wife of Chief T. A. Fuji, often shown as his favourite. In 2018, she played "Ene" in the Nigerian animation film Sade. Her character is a woman who didn't utilize what she has until she lost it. According to her, everyone can identify with the film because of its comedic tone. She was the producer of Evil Passion, Stainless, and the radio show, Onga. Speaking on female sexual harassment in the industry, Nwosu explained that it could be fine when producers make sexual advances toward an actress, but she considers it more demeaning when the actress seduces the producer. She also stated that every actress has the right to say no to anything that is not comfortable for them. She has also featured in music videos for Chidinma Ekile, Fair Prince, and Davido. She is also on set for Ndani.

== Personal life ==
Nwosu called off her wedding two days before the event because her soon to be spouse gave her a severe beating while she was pregnant.

In 2012, Nwosu fell ill, which affected her career. The diagnosis was reported to be related to a kidney disease. She eventually got treatment in the UK through the government and some organizations. She vowed not to offer free services to her state, Abia State, because the state government abandoned her when she needed support.

== Filmography ==
Nwosu had a role in Light in the Dark (2019), a feature film that starred Joke Silvia, Rita Dominic, Angel Unigwe among others. She also appeared in The Silent Baron and Crazy Grannies.

=== Films ===
- Living in Bondage(1992)
- Circle Of Doom(1993)
- Evil Passion(1993)
- Fake Doctor(2002)
- A Cry For Help(2002)
- No Shaking(2003)
- Dry Fish(2003)
- Greatest Weapon(2006)
- Before Ordination(2006)
- Tanbolo(2006)
- Old Cargo(2007)
- Next Door Neighbour(2007)
- Throne Of Tears(2008)
- My Darling Princess (2008)
- Holding Hope(2010)
- Kidnap(2012)
- Stigma(2013)
- Beyond Disability(2014)
- Skinny Girl in Transit(2015)
- The Inn(2016)
- Isoken(2017)
- The InLaws(2017)
- My Wife & I (2017)
- The Other Wife(2018)
- Sade(2019)
- Knock out (2019)
- Dead Rite(2019)
- Light in the Dark(2019)
- Sweet Face(2020)
- Dream Job(2021)
- Crazy Grannies (2021) as Cheta
- Before Valentine's(2022)
- The Pattern (2022)
- Silent Baron (2022)
- The Smart Money Woman (2024)
- nwosu mary ngozi (2025-2026)

== See also ==
- List of Nigerian actors
- List of Nigerian film producers
