= Saheed Balogun =

Nigerian actor (born 1967)

SAIDI BALOGUN
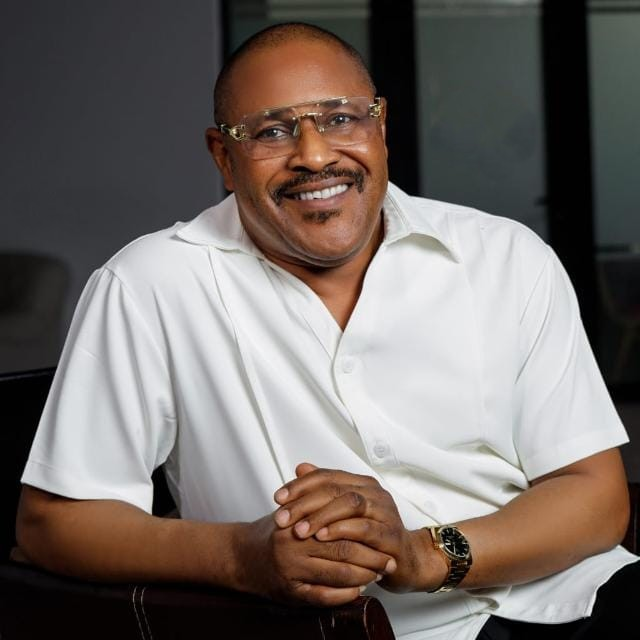
- Saidi Balogun
- Born: 5 February 1967 (age 59); Oyo State, Nigeria
- Citizenship: Nigeria
- Education: Kwara State Polytechnic
- Occupations: Actor; Musician; filmmaker; producer; director; Events Anchor; Master of Ceremony
- Years active: 1978–present
- Known for: Director/Producer of the first 2cast film - Modupe Temi - in Africa and the first 3cast film - Gbogbo Ere - in West Africa
- Children: 4

Saheed Balogun (sometimes spelled "Saidi") (born February 5, 1967) is a veteran Nigerian actor, film-maker, director, and producer of many movies which include the first 2 cast movie in Africa and first 3 cast movies in West Africa etc.

== Early life and career ==
Saidi Balogun was born on 5 February, Enugu State, South-East Nigeria but hails from Oyo State, Nigeria where he had his primary, secondary and tertiary education respectively. He graduated from Kwara State Polytechnic. He began his acting career in 1978, when he acted his first television program titled "Youth Today" on NTA. He produced his first film titled City Girl in 1989, but had also been featured in other movies; and he produced and directed several Nigerian films before then.

== Personal life ==
Saidi Balogun was initially married on September 7, 2000. to a nollywood actress, Fathia Balogun but they separated and divorced.

He is remarried and has four children.

== Selected filmography ==
- Modupe Temi (Thankful) - The first two- cast movie in Africa
- Gbogbo Ere (Total profit) - The first three cast movie in west Africa
- Third Party - The first ever ankara movie in Africa
- Atlanta (2004) - Tola
- Òfin mósè (2006) as Fred
- Tomo tiya (2008) - Yemi
- Family on Fire (2011)
- Rogbodiyan (2017) as Doctor
- Light In The Dark (2019) as Kay
- Don't Get Mad Get Even (2019) as Kasali
- Shadow Parties (2020) as Akuwe
- The Legend of Inikpi (2020) as Oracle
- The Therapist (2021) as Mr. Priye
- The Herbert Macaulay Affair (2019) as Eshugbayi Eleko
- Light in the Dark (2018), a feature film featuring Angel Unigwe, Joke Silvia, Rita Dominic, among others.
- Sugar Babies (2020) as Alhaji
- Funfun - White (2021)
- Online (2021)
- Finding Ireti (2022)
- Scourge (2022)
- Itedara (2022) as Director
- Mrs Everything (2023)
- Emphemeral (2024)

He Also Acted in the Movie Called Ologbo dudu as Walata, Movie By kola olotu
