= Ken Erics =

Nigerian actor (born 1985)

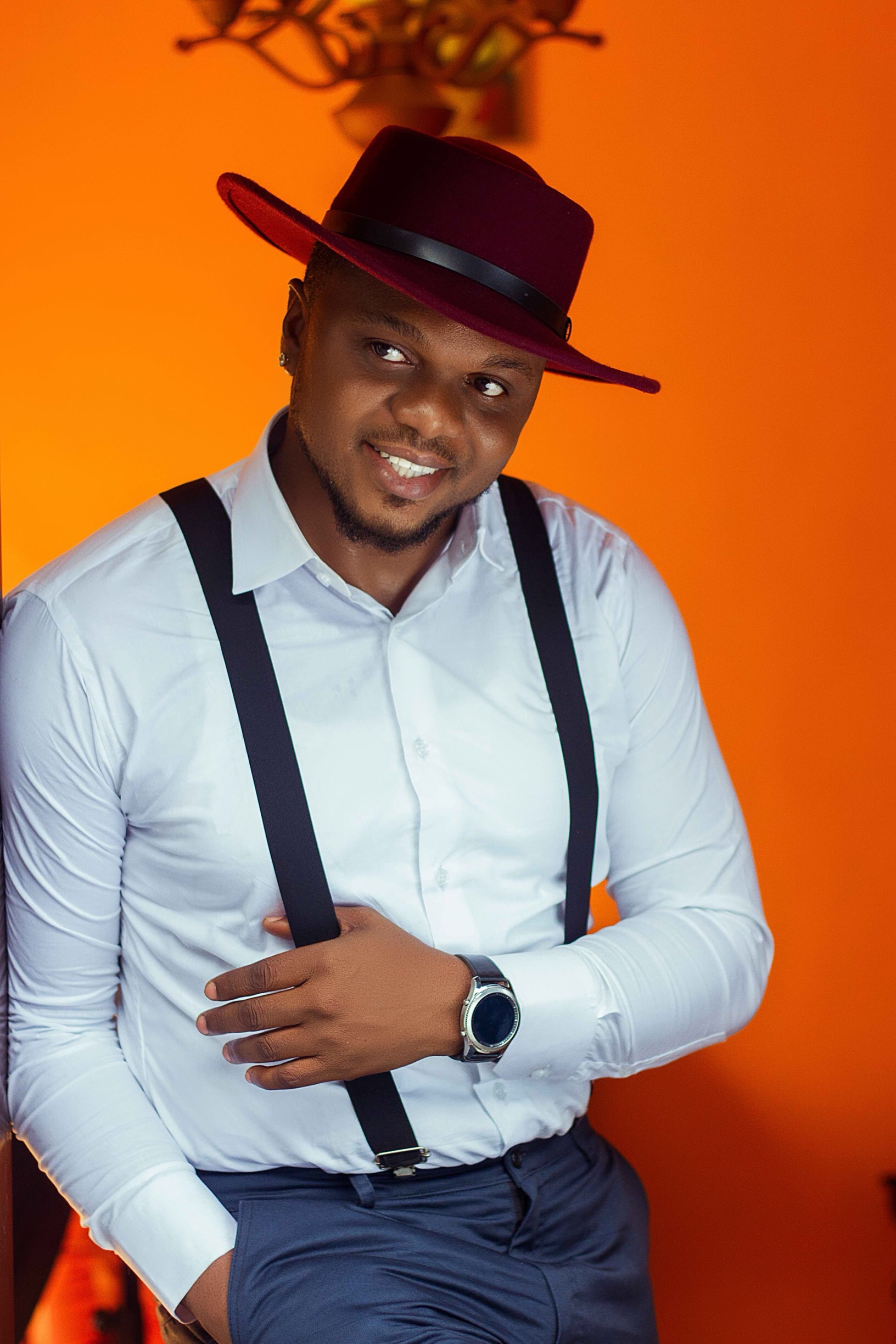
- Ken Erics in 2019
- Born: Ekenedilichukwu Ugochukwu Eric Nwenweh; 28 February 1985 (age 41); Kano, Kano State, Nigeria
- Education: Nnamdi Azikiwe University, Awka
- Occupations: Actor, writer, producer, musician, politician
- Years active: 2001–present
- Notable work: Okafor's Law
- Awards: 2015 City People Entertainment Awards, Best Actor
- Website: https://kenericsofficial.com/

Ekenedilichukwu Ugochukwu Eric Nwenweh (born 28 February 1985), professionally known as Ken Erics Ugo or simply Ken Erics, is a Nigerian film and television actor, writer, producer and occasional musician. He is popularly known for his role as Ugo in the movie The Illiterate alongside Tonto Dikeh and Yul Edochie.

== Early life and education ==
Erics was born in Kano State, Northwest Nigeria on 28 February 1985 and is the sixth of seven children of Eric Chukwuemeka Nwenweh and Grace Ifeyinwa Nwenweh both of Enugwu-Ukwu in Anambra State, Southeast Nigeria. He is of Igbo descent. Erics had his primary education at Binta Mustapha Science Nursery and Primary School, Kano and his secondary education at Dennis Memorial Grammar School (DMGS) Onitsha, Anambra State. As a child, Erics showed a passion for the arts and this culminated in his admission to the Nnamdi Azikiwe University, Awka, Anambra State, where he graduated with a degree in theatre arts. He also holds a master's degree in theatre and film studies.

== Career ==
In 2001, as a first-year student in the university, Erics got his first movie role in the Chris Ubani directed direct-to-DVD movie Holy Prostitute, where he played a minor role as a medical doctor with just three scenes. He went on to graduate from the university and began to attend auditions and bagged a few other cameo roles in home movies. However, his 2012 portrayal of Ugo in the movie The Illiterate endeared him to audiences and opened up more opportunities for him in the Nigerian movie industry.

As a writer, Erics' first published work, Cell 2, has gained attention and has been used in a number of Nigerian tertiary institutions for stage productions and academic purposes.

As an occasional singer and musician who plays the guitar and keyboard, Erics, who had earlier run his own musical band, has been involved in the production of a number of original movie soundtracks.

He also has acted alongside top movie stars like; Ngozi Ezeonu, Yul Edochie, Desmond Elliot, Chiwetalu Agu, Regina Daniels and more.

In 2014, Erics won the award for Best Supporting Actor at the City People Entertainment Awards, as well as the Best Lead Actor at the Afrifimo Awards in the United States. In 2015, he went on to win the Best Lead Actor award at the City People Entertainment Award.

In 2017, Erics won the City People Entertainment Awards 2017 for Best Actor of the Year and was also nominated for the Golden Movie Awards in 2018, for Best supporting Actor.

In December 2018, Erics released his first music single "Inozikwa Omee" to positive reviews from some of his fans.

== Personal life ==
On 28 December 2017, Erics married Onyi Adada. However, in March 2019, he announced his decision to divorce her due to irreconcilable differences, stating that the marriage had become unbearable and expressing relief over the separation.

== Awards and nominations ==
Year	Event	Prize	Recipient	Result
2014	City People Entertainment Awards	Best Supporting Actor	Ken Erics	Won
2014	Afrifimo Awards (USA)	Best Lead Actor	Ken Erics	Won
2015	Golden Icons Movie Awards (GIAMA) 2015 Awards	Best Actor in a Lead Role	Ken Erics	Nominated
2015	Golden Icons Movie Awards (GIAMA) 2015 Awards	Best 'on-screen duo'	Ken Erics and Kiki Omeili	Nominated
2015	City People Entertainment Awards	Best Actor	Ken Erics	Won
2015	Afrifimo Awards (USA)	Best 'on-screen duo'	Ken Erics	Nominated
2017	City People Entertainment Awards	Best Actor	Ken Erics	Won
2017	Nollywood Ambassadors Awards	Best Actor of the Year	Ken Erics	Won
2018	Golden Movie Awards (GMA) 2018	Best Supporting Actor	Ken Erics	Nominated
2019	South South Achievers Awards (SSA) 2019	Male Actor of the Year	Ken Erics	Won

== Filmography ==
Movie Roles

Year	Title	Role	Director	Notes
2002	Holy Prostitute	Doctor	Chris Ubani	Cameo Role
2004	Danger Signal	Fellow	Teco Benson	with Tunde Alabi, Toyin Alausa
2006	Silence of the gods	Onyegbula	Teco Benson	Home Video
2007	Eran and Erak	Oliver	Theodore Anyanji	Feature Film
2008	Indian Doctor	Anyasisigwu	Theodore Anyanji	Drama
2010	Evil intention	Santos	Ugezu J. Ugezu	Feature Film
2010	Lonely Walk	Chris	Ikenna Aniekwe	With Mercy Johnson Okojie, Ngozi Ezeonu, Pete Edochie
2011	Gold not Silver	Nwokolo	Tchidi Chikere	Feature Film
2011	A Better Tomorrow	Izu	Michael JaJa	Feature Film
2011	Days of Gloom	Izu	Michael JaJa	Feature Film featuring John Dumelo, Olu Jacobs and Chioma Chukwuka
2012	The Illiterate	Ugo	Silvester Madu	Feature Film
2013	Release me oh Lord	Osita	Ifeanyi Ogbonna	Feature Film
2014	Father Muonso	Father Elijah	Vincent De Anointed	Feature Film
2014	Burning Bridges	Louis	Okechukwu Oku	Feature Film
2014	Sugarcane	Azuka	Obinna Ukeze	Feature Film
2015	Trials of Igho	Igho	Chris Eneaji	Lead/Feature Film
2015	Pot of Gold	Dubem	Okey-Zubelu Okoh	With Happiness Amadi, Tina Amuziam, Cheryl Ann Amachree
2015	Echoes of Love	Prince	Ugezu J. Ugezu	Feature Film
2015	Omalicham	Jeremiah	Ugezu J. Ugezu	Feature Film
2016	Almost Perfect	Nonso	Desmond Elliot	Feature Film
2016	Within these walls	Francis	Uche Jombo	Feature Film
2016	Valerie	Joe	Taiwo Shittu	Feature Film
2016	The Vengeance	Jeff	Goodnews Erico Isika	Feature Film
2016	Okafor's Law	Chuks A.k.A Fox	Omoni Oboli	Feature Film featuring Blossom a Chukwujekwu, Richard Mofe Damijo, Omoni Oboli
2017	Crossed Path	Jesse	Frank Rajah Arase	Feature Film featuring Okawa Shaznay, Frank Artus & Emem Inwang
2017	What Lies Within	Brian	Vanessa Nzediegwu	Feature Film with Michelle Dede, Tope Tedela, Kiki Omeili
2017	Omugwo	Raymond	Kunle Afolayan	Feature Film featuring Patience Ozokwo, Ayo Adesanya, Omowunmi Dada
2017	Body Language	Lancelot	Moses Inwang	Feature Film featuring Ramsey Nouah, Tana Adelana
2017	The Bridge	Augustine	Kunle Afolayan	Feature Film featuring Chidinma Ekile, Demola, Adedoyin, Zach Orji
2017	Fate of Amanda			
2018	You Are My Light	Samson	Vincent D Anointed	Feature Film produced by Ken Erics and featuring Yvonne Jegede, Ebele Okaro
2018	The Outcast	Prince Nnamdi	Goodnews Erika Isika	with Chacha Eke, Vincent Able, Positive Abuchi
2019	Love Melody	Obiora	Ability Tagbo	Feature Film produced by Ken Erics and featuring Rachael Okonkwo
2019	Ordinary Fellows	Ekene	Lorenzo Menakaya and Ikenna Aniekwe	Feature Film featuring Wale Ojo, Chiwetalu Agu and Somadina Adinma
2020	Abike		Pascal Amanfo	Feature Film with Yvonne Jegede, Vivica Anuforo, Ego Nworji
2021	The Pocket Book	William	Victo Onwudiwe	with Chiege Alisigwe, Duke Agogo
2021	Shadow Parties	Aremu	Yemi Amodu	Feature Film with Toyin Abraham, Merit Adewale, Segun Arinze
2021	Heat Wave	Chike	Ndave Chinweike David	Feature Film with Juliet Eberechi, Prosper Godwin
2022	Complicated	Kelvin	Emmanul Anyaka	Feature Film with Onyii Alex, Moyo Lawal, Austin Ogbuefi
2022	The Anointed Bride	Prince Izunna	Ugezu J. Ugezu	Feature Film with Nwaoha Chioma, Ibiwari Etuk, Joyce Kalu
2022	Yahoo+	Ikolo	Ebuka Njoku	Feature Film with Somadina Adinma, Lorenzo Menakaya, and Lillian Echelon Mbadiwe
2023	Beyond Desires	Jimmy	Magnus Oku & Vasilisa Forbes	Short film

=== Television ===
Year	Title	Role	Director	Notes
2005	Webs		Livinus Otteh	TV series
2015	Growing Old	Chidi	Chris Eneaji	TV series

Stage Plays

Title	Role	Writer
Hopes of the Living Dead	Hacourt Whyte	Ola Rotimi
Trials of Oba Ovoramnwen	Consular	Ola Rotimi
Hangmen Also Die	R.I.P	Esiaba Irobi
Childe International	Chief	Wole Soyinka
Everyman	Everyman	Obotunde Ijimere
Grip Am	Ise	Ola Rotimi
Gold, Frankincense and Myrrh	Prof Ogun	Esiaba Irobi

== Discography ==
=== Selected singles ===
- "Inozikwa Omee" (2018)
- "Thank You Baba" (2019)
- "Mama" (2019)
- "Many Mysteries" (2019)
- "Sugarcane Baby" (2019)
- "Pretence" (2019)
- "Anom Gi N’aka" (2019)
- "Love is Life" (2019)
