= Eastern Nigeria International Film Festival =

Annual film festival in Enugu, Nigeria

- Location: Enugu, Nigeria
- Founded: 2020
- Founded by: Ujuaku Akukwe,Chris Odili
- Website: http://eniff.org/

The Eastern Nigeria International Film Festival (ENIFF) is an annual international film festival that was launched in Enugu State, Nigeria in 2020. The film festival was founded by Ujuaku Akukwe and Chris Odili.

The film festival has attracted over 4000 submissions from filmmakers from all over the globe. The Eastern Nigeria International Film Festival since inception, has collaborated with The Film Lab Africa, European Union, United States Mission, Afia TV and Viva Cinema.

== History and founding ==
In 2020, a filmmaker, Ujuaku Akukwe and Chris Odili founded the Eastern Nigeria International Film Festival in Enugu, Enugu State, Nigeria. As of 2025, the festival has been held for five consecutive years since its maiden edition. Nigerian radio host, actor, and filmmaker Lorenzo Menakaya has been the Festival Manager of ENIFF since 2020.

The festival premiered with award categories for Best Animation, Best Documentary Feature, Best Narrative Short, Best Nigerian Film, Best Narrative Feature, Best Female Performance, Best Male Performance, Best Director, Best Film and Special Jury Prize.

Despite being planned as an in-person event, the maiden edition of the festival resorted to a virtual event due to the COVID-19 restrictions on public gathering. Forty films were screened at the maiden edition, including the 91st Academy Awards Best Live Action Short Film winner, Skin.

The second edition of the festival was held in 2021, showcasing 50 films from 15 countries from across the world. The 2022 edition of ENIFF opened with Black Mail, a film by the Nollywood filmmaker, Obi Emelonye.

In 2023, the Eastern Nigeria International Film Festival marked its fourth edition, opening with the Oscar-nominated Mami Wata by Nigerian filmmaker C.J Obasi, and showcasing 35 other films from 20 countries across the globe. The edition, themed "Reshaping the South East Creative Economy" was attended by the Consulate General of the United States in Nigeria. The sessions at the 2023 festival were facilitated by some industry executives like Femi Odugbemi, Ego Boyo, Emeka Mba, Jahman Anikulapo, Frank Nweke Jnr, Chiege Alisigwe, and Ujuaku Akukwe.

The 2024 edition of the festival was the fifth iteration of it, which screened The Man Died, a film inspired by Wole Soyinka's memoir, The Man Died. The 2024 festival featured a new category, the Best Film Shot in the Southeast award, as well as a special partnership with the European Union to promote short films and documentaries.

To build on the success of the Storytelling With AI workshop at the 2024 festival, the 2025 ENIFF promises a new award category dedicated to AI-generated films.

== Events ==
=== 2020 Eastern Nigeria International Film Festival ===
The maiden edition of the Eastern Nigeria International Film Festival was held online, from Wednesday, 4 November to Saturday, 7 November 2020, in Enugu State, Nigeria.

==== Award winners ====
Award	Winner	Country
Best Animation	Gon, the Little Fox	Japan
Best Documentary Short	Sunset in Makoko	Nigeria
Best Documentary Feature	Basill'ora	Italy
Best Narrative Short	Skin	United States
Best Nigerian FIlm	Blue	Nigeria
Best Narrative Feature	Anya	Mexico
Best Female Performance	María Fernanda Tovar (Anya)	Mexico
Best Male Performance	Anish Gosavi (Tak-Tak)	India
Best Director	Mika Johnson (Confessions of a Box Man)	Czech Republic
Best Film	Skin	United States
Special Jury Prize	Two Autumns in Paris	Venezuela
Audience Choice Award	Journey to Kenya	Sudan

=== 2021 Eastern Nigeria International Film Festival ===
The second edition of the Eastern Nigeria International Film Festival was held in-person, from Wednesday, 3 November to Saturday, 6 November 2021, in Enugu State, Nigeria, featuring winners like Ultimate Ink, a Moroccan movie and Yahoo+, a Nigerian movie.

==== Award winners ====
Award	Winner	Country
Best Female Performance	Echelon Mbadiwe for Yahoo+	Nigeria
Best Male Performance	Jerry Williams for Katakata (Chaos)	Nigeria
Best Documentary Feature	A Portrait On The Search For Happiness by Benny Rost	Germany
Best Director	Ram Ally Kasongo for Nyara	Tanzania
Special Mention	Verona by Ane Sidarman	Brazil
Special Jury Prize	Listen by Udoka Oyeka	Nigeria
Best Narrative Feature	Yahoo+ by Ebuka Njoku and Lorenzo Menakaya	Nigeria
Best Narrator Short	Ultimate Ink by Yazid Elkadiri	Morocco
Best Documentary Short	I Won't Kneel by Hilda Awori	Uganda
Best Animation	Artifact by Durotimi Akinkugbe	Nigeria
Best Experimental FIlm	The First Call by Angela Onuora	Canada

=== 2022 Eastern Nigeria International Film Festival ===
The 2024 edition of the Easter Nigeria International Film Festival was held in-person, from Tuesday, 29 November to Friday, 2 December 2022, in Enugu State, Nigeria.

==== Award winners ====
Award	Winner	Country
Best Film	Black Mail by Obi Emelonye	Nigeria
Best Director	Obi Emelonye for Black Mail	Nigeria
Audience Choice Award	Away by Victor Okechukwu Onwudiwe and Goodnews Erico Isika	Nigeria
Best Narrative Short	Tales Of The Browbeaten by Sebastien Ukwa	Nigeria
Lifetime Achievement Award	Pete Edochie	Nigeria
Best International Short	In The Stillness by Naira Adedeji	United States
Best Documentary Feature	The Africologist:Chronicles Of Africa by Valerio Lopes	Cape Verde
Best Documentary Short	Barry The Beekeeper by Ikram Ahmed	United Kingdom
Best Animation	Scale by Joseph Pierce	France
Special Jury Prize	Operation Lights Out by Angela Onuora	Canada

=== 2023 Eastern Nigeria International Film Festival ===
The fourth iteration of the Eastern Nigeria International Film Festival was held in Enugu State, Nigeria, from Tuesday, 21 November to Saturday, 25 November 2023.

==== Award winners ====
Award	Winner	Country	Ref
Best Film	Mami Wata	Nigeria	
Best Animation	Hekima Ya Usawa by Telly Gary Jeannot	Cameroon	
Best Director	C.J Obasi for Mami Wata	Nigeria	
Best International Documentary Feature	The Journey	Morocco	
Best Cinematography	Lilis Soares for Mami Wata	Nigeria	
Grand Jury Award	Jigeen Ni - The Way Of The Women by Zribiaa Said	France	
Best Diaspora Narrative Short	Ada Ani (The Awakening) by Andrea R. Ciobanu	United Kingdom	
Audience Choice Award	Ifediche by Brown Ene	Nigeria	
Best Documentary Short	On Your Own by Daniel Omokhagbo Itegboje	Nigeria	
Special Jury Award	Oso Afia	Nigeria	
Best Documentary Feature	The Soul Of Oja by Chiamaka Keren-happuch Odinenu	Nigeria	
Best Narrative Short	Man And Masquerades by Adekunle Blue	Nigeria	
ENIFF Honorary Award	The Delectable Azeezah Sama	Nigeria	
Legend Award (Posthumous)	Amaka Igwe	Nigeria	

=== 2024 Eastern Nigeria International Film Festival ===
The 2024 edition and the 5th iteration of the Eastern Nigeria International Film Festival was held in Enugu State, Nigeria, from Wednesday, 27 November to Saturday, 30 November 2024.

==== Award winners ====
Award	Winner	Country	Ref
Audience Choice Award	The Man Died	Nigeria	
Best Short Film	I Too, Crave Death by Uchenna Ugwu	Nigeria	
Best Film Shot in the Southeast	Women of Salt by Chinyere Eneh	Nigeria	
Best Screenplay award	The Man Died	Nigeria	
Best Feature Film	Makula by Nisha Kalema	Uganda	
