= Nazo Ekezie =

Nigerian actress and producer

- Born: Chinazorom Ekezie; Anambra State
- Education: B.Sc English Language and Linguistics, Ebonyi State University
- Alma mater: Ebonyi State University
- Occupations: Actress; Film producer
- Years active: 2010–present
- Mother: Eucharia Ekezie
- Awards: City People Entertainment Awards for Best Upcoming Actress of the Year (English)

Nazo Ekezie (born December 22) is a Nigerian actress and film producer. She won the 2017 City People Movie Awards (eight in the series) for Best Upcoming Actress of the Year (English).

== Biography ==
Ekezie is the second out of four children.

=== Education ===
Ekezie attended her secondary school at the Federal Government Girls College, Lejja, Nsukka in Enugu State. She has a bachelor’s degree in English and Linguistics from the Ebonyi State University.

=== Career ===
Ekezie is a Nigerian actress and film producer who started acting between 2009 and 2010. She came into the limelight after featuring in the movie Thanks for Coming, produced by Uche Nancy.

In 2018, Ekezie produced her own movie, Flawed, She featured in the movie alongside Nollywood actors such as Ebele Okaro, Mofe Duncan, and Bolaji Ogunmola.

Ekezie owns the Unoaku Production Company.

On November 26, 2020, the birthday of the Nigerian singer and music producer Don Jazzy, Ekezie asked Don Jazzy out on a date while sending birthday wishes via Instagram. He accepted the request.

== Selected filmography ==
Filmography
Year	Title	Role	Selected cast	Ref.
2024	Rush Hour	Ada	Mercy Aigbe, Chinwe Chukwudire, Lucy Edet	
2023	Broken Mirror	Chika	Charis Agidigbi, Bennylove Asom, Ifeanyi Kalu, Jimmy Odukoya, Jessica Opara	
2022	Escape	Mabel	Bayray McNwizu, Eddie Watson	
2021	Ill Fated	Freda	Daniel Aliyu; Kin Jacob; Chenna Nnanna	
2020	Deeply in Love	Eden	Tracy Edwin; Iyiola Elvis; Mercy Macjoe; Wole Ojo	
2020	A Dance to Forget	Juliet	Ngozi Ezeonu; Alex Usifo; Nancy Isime; Federick Leonard	
2019	Flawed	Chita	Mofe Duncan; Bolaji Ogunmola; Ebele Okaro; Atewe Raphael	
2018	Children's Day		Sam Uche Ayamele; Wole Ojo; Jude Orhorha; Lisa Onu	
2017	Surprise Wedding	Bunmi	Lucy Ameh; Ayo Adesanya Hassan; Rachel Oniga; Kunle Remi; Emem Ufot	
2011	Gallant Babes	Bella	Odera Arinze; Ese Brodericks; Yul Edochie; Angela Okorie; Mercy Johnson; Chidi Okafor; Chinyere Wilfred	

== Accolades ==
Ekezie won the City People Movie Awards (eight in the series) for Best Upcoming Actress of the Year (English). The award ceremony was held on October 8, 2017, at Balmoral Event Center, Oregun, Ikeja, Lagos, and her award was presented by City People Magazine.
