= Mbadiwe =

- Language: Igbo

Origin
- Meaning: The nation is angry
- Region of origin: Southeast Nigeria

Mbadiwe // is an Igbo surname that means “the nation is angry”.

Gloss:

Mba - the nation

Dị - is

Iwe - angry

== People with this surname ==
- Eddie Mbadiwe (born 1942), Nigerian politician
- Elma Mbadiwe, Nigerian actress
- K. O. Mbadiwe (1915–1990), Nigerian politician
- Lillian Echelon Mbadiwe, Nigerian actress, producer and model
