= Ifeanyi Kalu =

Nigerian actor (born 1988)

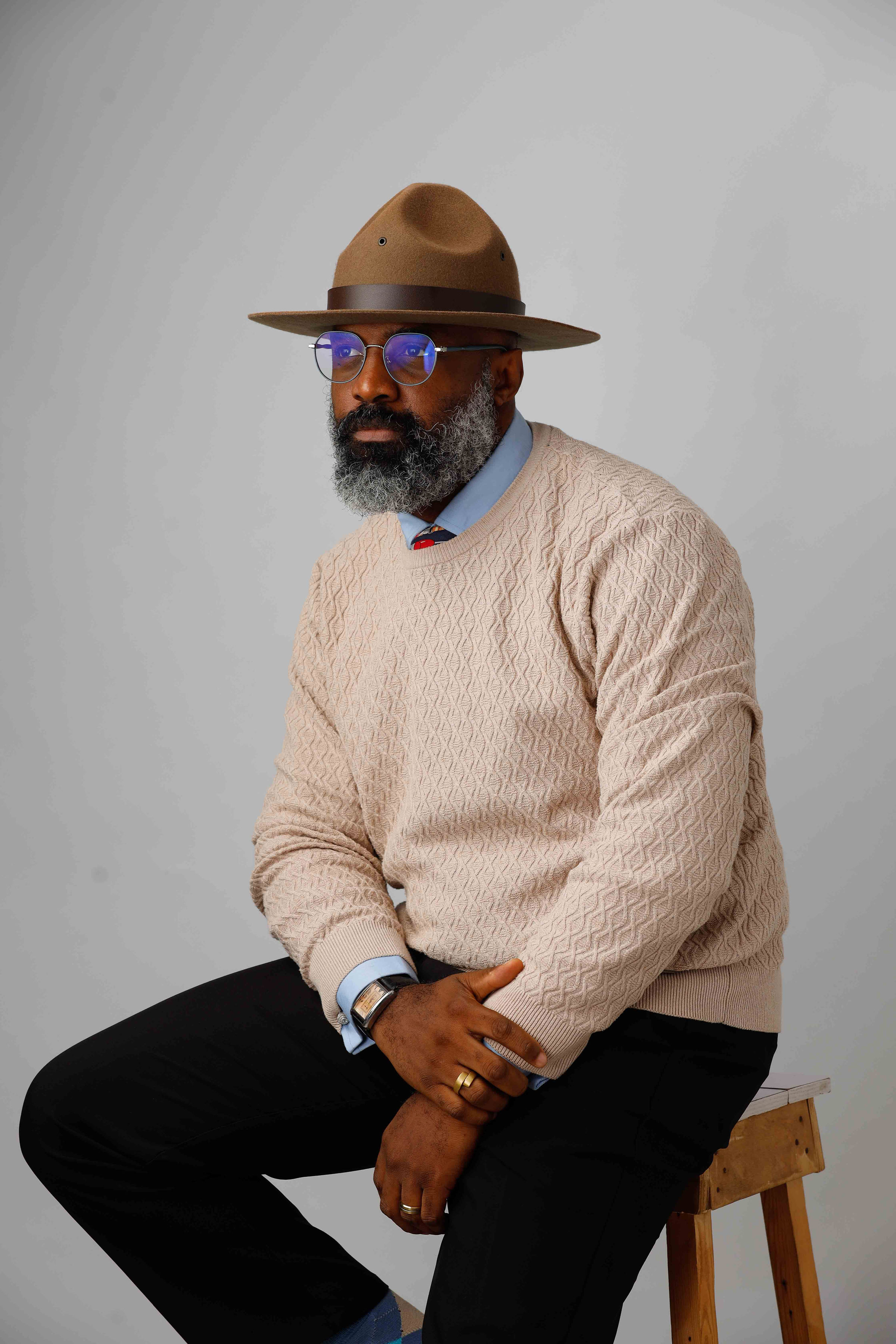
- Born: Ifeanyi Kalu; 13 February 1988 (age 38); Surulere, Lagos, Nigeria
- Citizenship: Nigerian
- Occupations: Visual Storyteller, Actor, Film maker
- Years active: 2010 – present
- Spouse: Nicolette Ndigwe Kalu
- Website: www.ifeanyikalu.com

Ifeanyi Kalu Ifeanyi Kalu is a Nigerian actor, visual artist, filmmaker, and pastor known for his work in Nollywood film and television. He gained wider recognition for his performances in productions such as the Netflix original series, Wrath and Revenge which is the official spin-off series of the hit Nigerian political drama Sons of The Caliphate, FilmOne Entertainment’s Adire, and films including Mother’s Love, Remi and Nneoma, On Different Grounds, and Blood Sisters 2.

Beyond acting, Kalu’s work extends into photography and visual storytelling, where he explores atmosphere, everyday life, space, and the relationship between people and their environments through cinematic imagery. Based in Lagos, his visual work exists between documentary observation and cinema, often using texture, stillness, and mood to examine contemporary African life and cultural continuity.

In December 2025, he was ordained as a pastor at Celebration Church International, a role he has described as his highest calling — representing Jesus Christ and communicating His truth through ministry and culture.

== Early life ==
Kalu was born in Surulere, a suburb in Lagos State, southwestern Nigeria. Kalu is of Igbo heritage from Imo State in the eastern part of Nigeria. He studied Computer science in the university.

== Personal life ==
Kalu married filmmaker Nicolette Ndigwe in 2021.

== Career ==
Kalu began his career as a model, appearing in television and billboard commercials. In 2011, he enrolled in the Royal Arts Academy to study acting. His breakout screen role was in 2012, when he was cast in the role of Usen in the movie Kokomma produced by Uduak Isong Oguamanam and directed by Tom Robson. The movie received 3 nominations at the 9th Africa Movie Academy Awards.

In 2014, his roles in the movies Lagos Cougars and Perfect Union earned him a City People Awards nomination for Most Promising Actor, an award he was again nominated for in 2017. In 2019 he received another nomination from City People Awards for Best Supporting Actor, and in the same year, he was nominated for and won the Best Supporting Actor award at the United Kingdom-based Zulu African Film Academy Awards (ZAFAA), for his role in the movie Kuvana, where he starred alongside Wale Ojo, Sambasa Nzeribe and Ivie Okujaiye.

In 2026, he participated in For This Cause, a group exhibition at Kokopelli Gallery, Ikoyi, Lagos, as part of the Parcours Récits Croisés Art Circuit, alongside Titilola Fagbemi, Chukwuemeka Anthony, Okenwa Chimaobi, and Femi Arogundade.

== Filmography ==
=== Selected movie roles ===
Year	Title	Role	Director	Notes
2012	Kokomma	Usen	Tom Robson	Feature Film featuring Belinda Effah, Ekere Nkanga, Ini Ekpe
2013	Lagos Cougars	Jite	Desmond Elliot	Feature Film starring Uche Jombo, Monalisa Chinda, Alexx Ekubo, Shawn Faqua, Daniella Okeke, Ben Touitou
2014	Perfect Union	Eke Agbai	Uzodinma Okpechi	Feature Film starring Wole Ojo, Brycee Bassey, Joju Muse
2015	The Banker	Kunle	Ikechukwu Onyeka	Feature Film featuring Seun Akindele, Mbong Amata, Belinda Effah, Maureen Okpoko, Nsikan Isaac
2016	Double Bind	Nosa	Emmanuel Akaemeh	Feature Film starring Kiki Omeili, Ujams Cbriel, Mary Chukwu
2016	The Novelist	Joseph	Patience Oghre Imobhio	Feature Film featuring Rykardo Agbor, Bayray Mcnwizu, Kehinde Olorunyomi, Labelle Vitien, Frank Paladini
2017	You, Me, and the Guys	Koje Williams	Esther Abah	Feature Film featuring Lota Chukwu, Linda Ejiofor, Seun Akindele, Abayomi Alvin, Jude Orhorha
2017	3 is a Crowd	Bayo	Desmond Elliot	Feature Film starring Tana Adelana, Desmond Elliot, Lilian Esoro, Alexx Ekubo, Eddie Watson, Cgris Akwarandu, Hauwa Allahbura
2018	Drowning	Kay	Charles Brain Nnoshiri	Feature Film starring Mary Lazarus, Nazo Ekezie, Jide Kosoko, Jibola Dabo
2018	Almost a Virgin	Ricardo Phillips	Akin – Tijani Balogun	Feature Film starring Bimbo Ademoye, Emem Ufot, Chioma Okafor, Nonso Kalango, Gifty Powers
2018	Will You Marry Me	Uzor	Emmanuel Mang Eme	Feature Film featuring Ruth Kadiri, Wole Ojo, Stella Udeze, Peggy Ovire
2019	Lurikos	Michael	Edward Uka	Feature Film featuring Bolanle Ninalowo, Tamara Eteimo, Christian Paul
2019	Tea Room	Billy	Okey Ifeanyi	Feature Film starring Kenneth Okolie, Lota Chukwu, Calista Nwajide
2019	Kuvana	Mendas	Edward Uka	Feature Film featuring Wale Ojo, Sambasa Nzeribe, Ivie Okujaye, Stella Udeze
2019	Red Obsession	Temisan	Esosa Egbon	Feature Film starring Yvonne Jegede, Moyo Lawal, Georgina Ibeh, Wole Ojo
2020	Just Before Dark	Tolu	Okey Ifeanyi	Also starring Nazo Ekezie, Ella Mercy, Sammy Umoren
2021	Black Friday	Morris	Ozioma B. Nwughala	Also starring Bimbo Ademoye, Adams Hope
2022	Judas	Tony	Chukwuma Emma-Ogbangwo	Also starring Tamara Eteimo, Joel Evans, Stan Nze
2023	Adire	Thomas	Adeoluwa Owu	Also starring Kehinde Bankole, Yvonne Jegede
2023	School Run	Timilehin	Edward Uka	Also starring Ogbolu Bobby, Greatness Ewurum, Amanda Iriekpen

=== Television roles ===
Year	Title	Role	Director	Notes
2014	Allison's Stand	Allison (Lead)	Peace Osigbe, Yemi Morafa (film boy)	TV series
2016	Desperate Housegirls	Shawn (Lead)	Sunkanmi Adebayo, Akin – Tijani Balogun	TV series on IrokoTV featuring Ini Edo, Belinda Effah, Deyemi Okanlawo, Bimbo Ademoye, Uzor Osimkpa, Uzor Arukwe
2017	Cougars	Dubem	Ikechukwu Onyeka, Akin – Tijani Balogun	TV series with Nse Ikpe Etim, Joselyn Dumas, Empress Njamah, Ozzy Agu, Monalisa Chinda
2017	Head over Heels	Lead	Ejiro Onobrakpor	TV series
2021	The Anomalous	Chinedu Obajuru	Chinedu Omorie	TV series
2021	Becoming Abi	MD	Bolu Essien, Terrel Ejem	Netflix Series
2023	WAR: Wrath and Revenge	Buba Koda	Dimbo Atiya	Netflix Series

=== Awards ===
Year	Event	Prize	Result
2012	Best of Nollywood Awards (BON)	Revelation of The Year	Nominated
2012	Best of Nollywood Awards (BON)	Most Promising Act (Male)	Nominated
2013	Nollywood Movie Awards	Best rising star	Nominated
2014	City People Awards	Most promising actor	Nominated
2015	Zaris Fashion and Style Academy	Hall of Fame	Won
2017	Royal Arts Academy	Award of Excellence	Won
2017	City People Awards	Most promising actor	Nominated
2018	HYPP Festival of Talents	Recognition Award	Won
2019	City People Awards	Best supporting actor	Nominated
2019	ZAFAA Awards	Best supporting actor	Won
