= Black Rose (2018 film) =

- Directed by: Okechukwu Oku
- Screenplay by: Beth Rogers
- Story by: Beth Rogers
- Produced by: Okechukwu Oku
- Starring: Blossom Chukwujekwu; Ebele Okaro; Lilian Echelon; Betty Bellor; JKA Swanky
- Cinematography: Okechukwu Oku
- Edited by: Okechukwu Oku
- Music by: Abiola
- Production company: Oracle Films
- Release date: 2018
- Country: Nigeria
- Languages: English, Pidgin

Black Rose (sometimes stylized Blackrose) is a 2018 Nigerian film produced and directed by Okechukwu Oku. It was released on Netflix in Nigeria and later globally.

== Plot ==
Since her husband died, Mama Nonso is the only one taking care of her 4 children, Ugo, Rose, Obi and Igbo. While the two boys Igbo and Obi still go to school, Rose helps out with her mother’s business cooking for people in the neighborhood. The first child, Ugo, is the black sheep as she ventured into prostitution. Ugo says that she is only prostituting herself for her family to eventually be able to leave this place that she calls depressing. Her mother, however, disapproves and shames her for her work saying that she prefers for the family to remain poor than any of her daughters having to have sex with men for money. While Ugo’s work is causing tensions and conflicts between her and her mother, Rose is the priceless gem of the family as she is caring and responsible. When Rose is bringing food to Tunde, the owner of the mechanic shop and one of her mother’s customers, he grabs her buttocks. She tells him off and later tells her mother who is furious. Nelo, an employee of Tunde watches the assault and is shocked. He later apologizes to Rose that this happened to her. When Rose is once again bringing food to the shop, she sees Desmond, a seemingly wealthy man in a big car. Looking at him, she accidentally drops the plate, and he offers to pay for it. Desmond then gives Rose a seemingly huge amount of money which she brings back to her mother and both are very grateful. Later, Rose returns to the shop offering Desmond food who initially refuses but then eats the meat cooked by her mother. As he likes the meat a lot, Desmond offers Rose and her mother a job bringing food to his house. Nonso eventually agrees as they can use the money to cover the school fees for the boys. From then on, Rose regularly goes to Desmond's place. One day, when she is about to leave, he holds her back and they kiss. Rose is happy and tells her sister Ugo about it. However, given that Desmond seems to be living alone but Rose and her mother bring big amounts of food every week, she asks him if he is with someone. Desmond denies saying that he has guests over sometimes and that he wants Rose to be his girlfriend. He gives her money from which she buys her brothers new clothes and herself a new watch. Mama Nonso gets angry when she finds out assuming that Rose sleeps with Desmond for money. Rose denies and tells her mother that she doesn’t love someone because of their money. When Rose hands out food to the workers, Nelo sees her and asks why she hasn’t been around lately. After struggling to find his words, he eventually tells Rose that he likes her. However, Rose rejects him saying that they can’t be more than friends. Nelo asks if she doesn’t want to be with him because of their impoverished living situation and assures that he’s trying everything to have a better life. Rose repeats that they can’t be more than friends not telling him about Desmond. The next time, Rose goes to Desmond’s house unannounced and finds him with a few other men upstairs. On the walls outside of the room are pictures of naked female bodies. When Desmond sees Rose, he seems angry that she is coming outside of their agreed hours and tells her to wait downstairs. One of the men tells Desmond that he wants to sleep with Rose. Desmond agrees and the man rapes her with the other men watching. The next time Rose comes to Desmond’s house to bring him food, he apologizes for what happened. Desmond starts crying and tells Rose that he is in huge debt and can’t be free unless he has paid back what he owes. Until then, they cannot be together. He says that there is only one way to settle his debts but that he needs her help implying that she has to sleep with men for money. Rose believes Desmond and agrees to help him. One time, Desmond calls Rose after she has been with one of the men asking her if he treated her well. She denies. He then asks whether he paid her well. Traumatized by what Desmond makes her do, Rose falls into a depression. Her mother asks her what is going on because Rose seems constantly absent. Despite what he makes her do, Rose is still with Desmond and slowly adopts his lifestyle, taking drugs and drinking. She only finds out that Desmond was using her when she eavesdrops a conversation between Desmond and his friend Abbey where he tells him that he is trying to get rid of Rose after having made his profit with her. Rose returns home and Ugo finds her in bed having taken cocaine and drunken. She screams at Rose asking whether she was trying to commit suicide. At night, Desmond calls Rose. Ugo picks up and tells him to never contact her sister again. Desmond then tells Abbey that he cannot reach Rose. Abbey reminds him of their deal and warns Desmond that if Abbey doesn’t meet Rose tonight, Desmond will pay with his life. Desmond then drives to Rose but gets involved in a car accident on the way. The end scene shows the family distributing food in the neighborhood when a seemingly expensive car arrives and Nelo, dressed in a suit, gets off and smiles at Rose.

== Cast ==
- Blossom Chukwujekwu as Desmond
- Ebele Okaro as Mama Rose
- Lilian Echelon as Rose
- Betty Bellor as Ugo
- Isaac Momoh as Obinna
- Emmanuel Okhakhu as Oga Tunde
- Martins Neboh as Mechanic 1
- Austin Ezeh as Mechanic 2
- JKA Swanky as Nelo
- Chibuike Oku as Nonso
- Rapper 2Shotz appears as himself.

== Reception ==
Pulse Nigeria listed it as one of the top Nollywood movies of 2018.

== Awards and nominations ==
Year	Award	Category	Recipient	Result	Ref
2018	Golden Movie Awards Africa	Golden Discovery Actor	Lilian Echelon	Won	
2018	Golden Movie Awards Africa	Golden Actress (Drama)	Lilian Echelon	Won	
2018	Golden Movie Awards Africa	Overall Golden Movie	–	Nominated	
2018	Africa Magic Viewers' Choice Awards	Best Supporting Actress	Ebele Okaro	Nominated	
2018	Africa Magic Viewers' Choice Awards	Best Actress in a Drama/TV Series	Lilian Echelon	Nominated	
2018	Zulu African Film Academy Awards	Best Child Performer	Chibuike Oku	Won	
2018	Zulu African Film Academy Awards	Best Newcomer Female	Lilian Echelon	Won	
2018	Zulu African Film Academy Awards	Best Producer	Okechukwu Oku	Nominated	
2018	Zulu African Film Academy Awards	Best Director	Okechukwu Oku	Nominated	
2018	Zulu African Film Academy Awards	Best Lead Actor Male	Blossom Chukwujekwu	Nominated	
2018	Zulu African Film Academy Awards	Best Film	–	Nominated	
2018	Zulu African Film Academy Awards	Best Picture Editing	Okechukwu Oku	Won	
2018	Zulu African Film Academy Awards	Best Screenplay	Beth Rogers	Nominated	
2019	Best of Nollywood Awards	Best Actor in a Lead Role (English)	Blossom Chukwujekwu	Nominated	
2019	Best of Nollywood Awards	Best Actress in a Supporting Role (English)	Ebele Okaro	Won	
2019	Best of Nollywood Awards	Movie with the Best Screenplay	–	Nominated	
2019	Best of Nollywood Awards	Best Use of Nigerian Food in a Movie	–	Won	
2019	Best of Nollywood Awards	Best Use of Makeup in a Movie	–	Nominated	
2019	Best of Nollywood Awards	Movie with the Best Production Design	–	Nominated	
