= A Long Night =

- Directed by: Ike Nnaebue
- Produced by: Uche Jombo; Nelson Jombo
- Starring: Van Vicker; Julius Agwu; Bayray Mcwuize; Dayo Amusa
- Distributed by: Iroko Partners
- Release date: 2015
- Country: Nigeria
- Language: English

A Long Night is a 2015 Nollywood movie directed by Ike Nnaebue.

== Plot ==
A family gets attacked by armed robbers which should have been a one night robbery, but they did not get access to the money they were looking for, so they had to wait till the following morning to get the money.

== Cast ==
- Van Vicker as MP
- Julius Agwu as Shady
- Lepacious Bose as Aunty Bunmi
- Peggy Ovire as Teller 1
- Bayray McNwizu as Mary
- Tamara Eteimo as Blessing
- Uche Jombo as Anita
- Okey Uzoeshi as GM
- Martins Akomaye as Bank Security
- Dayo Amusa as Sec
- Sola Bamishe as Police Inspector
- Chika Chukwu as Ochi
- Daniel K. Daniel as Jude
- Seun Sean Jimoh as Tony
- May Owen as Bank Manager
