= Praiseworld Radio =

- Nigeria
- Broadcast area: Worldwide

Programming
- Language: English
- Format: Freeform radio
- Subchannels: iOS, BlackBerry OS/10

Ownership
- Owner: Praiseworld Network

History
- First air date: 1 June 2012; 13 years ago

Links
- Website: www.praiseworldradio.com

Praiseworld Radio is Nigeria first Gospel online radio best known for broadcasting 24/7 Urban, and Gospel hip hop music. The radio began broadcasting on June 1, 2012. In 2014, Praiseworld won the Nigerian Broadcasters Merit Awards for Best Online Radio Station. In 2019, Praiseworld won the Africa Gospel Music Awards for Online Gospel Station of Excellence.

== History ==
Praiseworld Radio was founded in 2012 by Tola Omoniyi, a Nigerian podcaster, hosting the Telling Bible Stories podcast.

== Overview ==
On 9 February 2013, Nikki Laoye announce her radio show titled "Girls Rock with Nikki Laoye" to air for 2 hours, weekly. From 23 March to 27 March 2020, PraiseWorld Radio held its radio conference titled: Faith Hope Love Conference 2020.

== Notable shows ==
=== Present ===
- The Praise O’Clock Show (With. TOLA)

=== Past ===
- Girls Rock with Nikki Laoye

== Awards and nominations ==
Year	Award ceremony	Award description	Recipient	Result
2012	Nigerian Broadcasters Merit Awards	Best Online Radio Station	Praiseworld Radio	Nominated
2013	Nigerian Broadcasters Merit Awards	Best Online Radio Station	Praiseworld Radio	Nominated
2014	Nigerian Broadcasters Merit Awards	Best Online Radio Station	Praiseworld Radio	Won
2014	Gospel Touch Music Awards	Best Radio Station	Praiseworld Radio	Nominated
2014	YadaMag Choice Awards	Website of The Year	Praiseworld Radio	Won
2014	YadaMag Choice Awards	Best TV/Radio Show	The Praise O’Clock Show (with. TOLA)	Won
2014	Africa Gospel Music Awards	Best Radio Program	The Praise O’Clock Show (with. TOLA)	Nominated
2018	Africa Gospel Music Awards	Online Gospel Station of Excellence	Praiseworld Radio	Won
2019	Africa Gospel Music Awards	Online Gospel Station of Excellence	Praiseworld Radio	Won
2019	Africa Gospel Music Awards	Radio Program of Excellence	Girls Rock with Nikki Laoye	Won
