= Musical Whispers =

2014 film directed by Bond Emeruwa

- Directed by: Bond Emeruwa
- Written by: Amaechi Ossai
- Produced by: Ebele Okaro
- Release date: 2014
- Country: Nigeria
- Language: English

Musical Whispers is a 2014 Nigerian film about autism and how to care for those with it. It was directed by Bond Emeruwa and written by Amaechi Ossai. The film was produced by Ebele Okaro. The film was premiered 30 May 2014 sponsored by a pharmaceutical industry, in attendance are dignitaries and movie actors such as Tonto Dikeh, Chioma Akpotha, Ebele Okaro-Onyiuke among others.

== Plot ==
David and Agatha gave birth to an autistic son, David Jr. Agatha is struggling to take care of the boy while David, out of frustration, engaged in extramarital affairs. Things got worse when Agatha lost her job, but she didn't give up on her son yet as he is enrolled into music with the support of Jasmine, her friend, and a musician, Jerry.

== Cast ==
- Kalu Ikeagwu as David
- Chioma Akpotha as Agatha Uche
- Ebele Okaro as Jasmine

Other actors starring in musical whispers include Kalu Ikeagwu, Ekpe young Bassey, and Victor Okenwa, Belinda Effa, Chikezie Uwazie and Chinedu Mbadiwe.
