= Our Jesus Story =

2020 Nigerian religious drama film

- Directed by: Tchidi Chikere
- Produced by: Ojiofor Ezeanyaeche
- Starring: Frederick Leonard; Zack Orji; Sam Dede; Eucharia Anunobi; Adjetey Anang
- Production company: O.J Production
- Release date: 27 March 2020; (Nigeria)
- Running time: 95 minutes
- Country: Nigeria
- Language: English

Our Jesus Story, is a 2020 Nigerian religious drama film directed by Tchidi Chikere and produced by Ojiofor Ezeanyaeche for O.J Production. The film stars Frederick Leonard in the lead role as Jesus the Christ, whereas Zack Orji, Sam Dede, Eucharia Anunobi and Adjetey Anang made supportive roles. This is the first biblical African new interpretation for the Jesus the Christ story with an all-black African cast and crew.

The film made its premier on 27 March 2020 in Imax Cinema in Lekki, Lagos. The film received positive reviews from critics.

== Cast ==
- Frederick Leonard as Jesus the Christ
- Zack Orji
- Sam Dede
- Eucharia Anunobi
- Adjetey Anang
- Ofia Mbaka
- Tchidi Chikere
