= Lorenzo Menakaya =

Nigerian actor (born 1986)

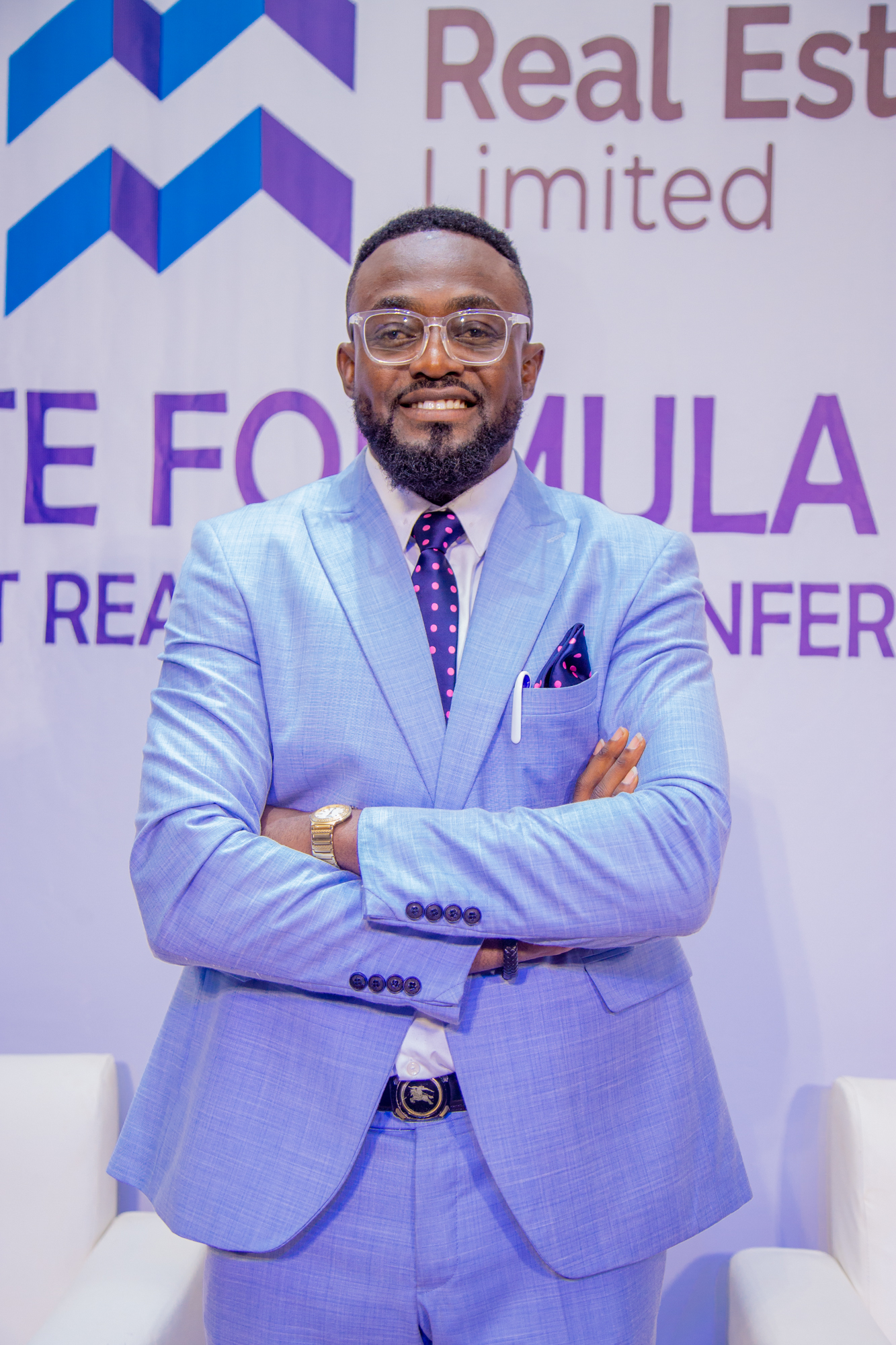
- Menakaya at Real Estate Formula Conference in 2021
- Born: Tochukwu Lorenzo Uzonna Menakaya; 4 April 1986 (age 40); Enugu, Nigeria
- Education: University of Nigeria Nsukka
- Occupations: Radio personality; Actor; Filmmaker; singer; Event host
- Years active: 2006–present
- Awards: Phoenix Global Awards, 2012

Tochukwu Lorenzo Uzonna Menakaya (born 4 April 1986) is a Nigerian on-air personality, actor, event host, filmmaker and singer. He received nominations for On-Air Personality (OAP) of the Year at The Future Awards Africa (TFAA) in 2011 and 2012, and he won the award of Outstanding Radio Presenter at the Nigerian Broadcasters Merit Awards in 2016. He also hosted the 2019 and 2020 Africa Movie Academy Awards.

== Career ==
Menakaya produced his debut feature film, Ordinary Fellows, in 2019, co-directing with Ikenna Aniekwe. In 2019, he was one of the hosts of the 15th Africa Movie Academy Awards along with actress Kemi Lala Akindoju and comedian Funny Bone. He also returned as the host for the awards ceremony in 2020. He played the role of Ubong on Trace TV's Crazy, Lovely, Cool. In 2021, he produced Yahoo+, a crime film starring Ken Erics; it was distributed on Netflix in 2023. In 2024, UNO: The F in Family, a feature film he produced, had its theatrical release. He has served as the Festival Manager of the Eastern Nigeria International Film Festival since 2020.

== Awards ==
Year	Award	Category	Result	Notes
2011	The Future Awards Africa	On-air Personality of the year	Nominated	
2012	The Future Awards Africa	On-air Personality of the year	Nominated	
2012	Phoenix Global Awards	On-air Personality of the year	Won	
2012	Nigerian Broadcasters Merit Awards	Most popular Radio Presenter (South East)	Nominated	
2013	Nigerian Broadcasters Merit Awards	Outstanding Radio Presenter of the year	Nominated	
2014	Nigerian Broadcasters Merit Awards	Nigerian Broadcaster of the year	Nominated	
2015	Nigeria Fashion & Style Awards	Radio Personality of the year	Won	
2016	Nigerian Broadcasters Merit Awards	Outstanding Radio Presenter (Midday)	Won	
2016	Nigerian Broadcasters Merit Awards	Nigerian Broadcaster of the year (Male)	Nominated	

== Filmography ==
=== Film ===
Year	Title	Role	Notes
2008	My Confession	Okezie	
2010	Lonely Walk	Lorenzo/Music Composer	Composed original soundtrack
2010	Room Service	Music Composer	
2010	Parish House	Ishmael	
2011	Spokesman for the Oracle	Ikem	
2012	My Diva	Chika	
2013	15 Minutes	Mark/Music Composer	Composed original soundtrack
2015	Sundown Tale	Juma/Producer/Director/Screenplay	Composed original soundtrack
2018	Wrong Initiation	Capone	
2018	Agwaetiti Obiụtọ	Akah	
2019	Ordinary Fellows	Director/Producer	
2020	River Rise	'Renzo	Short
2021	Badamasi	Colonel UK Bello	
2022	Yahoo+	Mansa	Producer
2023	Dark October	Student Leader	
2024	ỤNỌ: The F In Family	Producer	

=== Television ===
Year	Title	Role	Notes
2017 - 2018	Professor Johnbull	Jason	2 episodes (S04E4 & S05E8)
2019	Crazy, Lovely, Cool	Ubong	Directed by Obi Emelonye
2020 - 2022	Africa Movie Academy Awards	Producer	Executive produced by Peace Anyiam-Osigwe

=== Music videos ===
Year	Title	Artist(s)	Role	Ref.
2019	"I Pray"	Umu Obiligbo	Man	
