= Afia TV =

Regional television channel in Southeastern Nigeria

- Country: Nigeria
- Broadcast area: Nigeria; Africa
- Headquarters: Enugu, Nigeria

Programming
- Languages: English, Pidgin, Igbo
- Picture format: 1080i (HDTV)

Ownership
- Owner: Afia TV Limited
- Key people: • Chief Emeka Mba (CEO)
- Sister channels: Afia 99.3 FM

History
- Launched: February 17, 2023

Links
- Website: afiatv.net

Availability

Terrestrial
- DStv: Channel 254
- GOTV: Channel 17
- FreeTV: Channel 748

Streaming media
- YouTube: Afia TV on YouTube

Afia TV is a regional television channel based in Southeastern Nigeria, broadcasting on DSTV channel 254 and GOTV channel 17. Launched on February 17, 2023, it is the first regional television station in the Southeast region available on these platforms. The channel focuses on promoting the business, lifestyle, and cultural stories of Southeastern Nigeria, transmitting in English, Pidgin, and Igbo languages. Afia TV is owned by Afia TV Limited and led by CEO Chief Emeka Mba. It operates alongside sister platforms including Afia 99.3 FM radio and Afia Cinema, a film and television series division.

== History ==
Afia TV was launched on February 17, 2023, as the first regional television channel in Southeastern Nigeria on DSTV and GOTV platforms. The channel was founded by Chief Emeka Mba, a media executive with prior experience as Director General of the National Broadcasting Commission and National Film & Video Censors Board. It aims to provide 24-hour programming including lifestyle entertainment, documentaries, movies, and local news, with a goal of promoting the region's culture, business, and entertainment.

In December 2024, Afia TV expanded its reach by joining FreeTV on channel 748, allowing viewers across Nigeria to access its content.

In May 2025, Afia TV expanded into the Lagos media market, hosting a media parley at Sheba Center in Ikeja to announce its entry and commitment to data-driven content for partners. The expansion positioned Afia TV as a complementary regional player rather than a direct competitor to Lagos-based stations, offering multi-platform services including television, radio, and digital content.

Afia 99.3 FM, the channel's radio sister station based in Enugu, streams online and has become a prominent urban radio station in the state. Plans for further radio expansion were announced in 2025.

== Programming ==
Afia TV delivers high-quality programming ranging from news and documentaries to lifestyle, business, culture, and entertainment content. Notable programs include How Market, which features stories from local markets and product advertisements. The channel emphasizes original content that highlights Southeastern Nigerian perspectives.

Afia Cinema, a division founded under Afia TV, produces films and television series focused on Igbo-origin stories for global audiences. Additional services include multi-camera event coverage for sports, concerts, and corporate events, as well as live streaming.

== Initiatives and Events ==
Afia TV organizes and supports various cultural events under the Afia Homecoming banner, including Mike Ejeagha Day 2024, which honors the folk musician with screenings; the Golibe Festival, an annual celebration of Enugu State's cultural heritage; and the 25 Days of Christmas Festival featuring Afrobeat concerts.

In September 2025, Afia TV's Alaigbo Creative Circle initiative hosted its first workshop in Enugu, aimed at empowering Southeastern creatives through free training in photography, art, writing, and filmmaking. The initiative, launched in 2022, focuses on nurturing local talent and fostering a sustainable creative ecosystem.

Afia TV has served as a media partner for events such as the 2025 Onitsha Ofala Festival, where it collaborated with THISDAY/Arise Media Group and others. It also supported the Akamgba 2023 Igbo Traditional Wrestling Contest to promote cultural heritage and empower athletes.

In 2025, Afia TV partnered with Kanaz Group for the first-ever Igbo Global Icon Awards, celebrating excellence in sectors such as film, music, sports, education, journalism, and manufacturing.

== Partnerships ==
In 2025, Afia TV partnered with Anaedo TV, an online channel focused on Nnewi, Anambra State, to expand news and event coverage in the Southeast. The partnership combines traditional TV with digital platforms to provide in-depth content.

Afia TV was the official rights owner and broadcaster for the second Onitsha City Marathon in September 2023, providing live coverage to showcase Anambra State's culture.
