= Seun Sean Jimoh =

Nigerian actor

- Born: Seun Sean Jimoh
- Citizenship: Nigerian
- Occupation: Actor
- Years active: 2007
- Known for: A Long Night
- Spouse: Olatokunbo Morafa Jimoh (m. 2017)
- Children: Anjolaoluwa Jimoh; Dolabomi Jimoh

Seun Sean Jimoh is an American based Nigerian actor.

== Personal life ==
On 7 January 2017, Seun married Olatokunbo Morafa Jimoh. On 22 May 2019, via an Instagram post, he announced the arrival of his second child.

== Career ==
In 2007, he got his first supporting role as an actor on the Nigeria Yoruba soap opera "Kilanta", a family television sitcom showing on Africa Magic Yoruba, and Super Story, a family television drama series. He came into prominence in 2015, with a lead role on A Long Night, and The Ex (II), which also landed him an award at the 2016 Best of Nollywood Awards as the Revelation of the Year (male). In 2019, Seun Sean Jimoh produced his first movie titled "A Tale of Two Brothers" under Flintstone Pictures production, and on the 18th of October 2019, it was premiered in cinemas nationwide, starring Adeniyi Johnson, Sophie Alakija, Bolanle Ninalowo, and Skiibii as the main cast of the action drama.

== Filmography ==
Year	Film	Role	Notes
2015	The Ex (II)	Chinedu	Drama
2015	A Long Night	Tony	Drama
2020	Violated		Short Film

== Awards and nominations ==
Year	Event	Prize	Recipient	Result
2016	Best of Nollywood Awards	Revelation of the Year (male)	Himself	Won
2019	The 5th AEAUSA Awards	Best Actor In Diaspora	Himself	Won
