= Onitsha City Marathon =

Road running event in Onitsha, Nigeria

- Date: October (2019)
- Location: Onitsha, Anambra State, Nigeria
- Event type: Road
- Distance: Half marathon (21 km)
- Established: 2019

Onitsha City Marathon (OCM) is a road running event held in Onitsha, Anambra State, Nigeria. Established by the Onitsha Business School to promote sports entrepreneurship, tourism, and cultural heritage in southeastern Nigeria, it was the first internationally certified half marathon in the region. The race is certified by World Athletics, the Association of International Marathons and Distance Races (AIMS), and the Athletics Federation of Nigeria (AFN). As of 2025, only one edition has been held—the 2019 inaugural half-marathon—with subsequent editions postponed or cancelled due to logistical and sponsorship challenges. The marathon is distinct from the Anambra Marathon, a separate 40.2 km event organized by Thanos Charity Foundation.

== History ==
Conceived by Professor Olusegun Sogbesan, founder of the Onitsha Business School, the marathon was designed to highlight Onitsha's commercial and cultural assets while developing local athletic talent and promoting economic opportunities through sports. It coincides with cultural festivals like the Ofala Festival to enhance its appeal. The marathon route was measured by AIMS-certified measurer Norrie Williamson, who praised its flat terrain as one of the best in Nigeria and Africa for long-distance running.

Announced in August 2019, the inaugural edition anticipated over 10,000 participants, including international elite runners, and received endorsements from the Obi of Onitsha and corporate partners. Subsequent editions were disrupted by the COVID-19 pandemic in 2020 and further challenges, including the loss of a N400 million five-year sponsorship deal due to lack of state government endorsement. In 2023, a second edition was planned for September 30 but postponed to November 25 and later cancelled due to unresolved debts to 2019 athletes and logistical issues.

== Editions ==
=== 2019 ===
The inaugural marathon, a 21 km half-marathon, took place on October 5, 2019. It attracted over 1,000 participants from Nigeria, Kenya, Ghana, and Cameroon. Kenyan runners dominated, with Bernard Sang winning the men's category in 1:04:44 (Note: Some sources report Sang’s time as 1:14:44, likely a typo, as elite half-marathon times typically range from 60–65 minutes.) and Esther Chesang taking the women's title. Among Nigerian athletes, Emmanuel Pam and Fadekemi Olude from Plateau State were the top male and female finishers, with Pam placing 10th overall. William Amposah from Ghana was the first West African finisher, placing fifth overall. Prize money ranged from $10,000 to $1,000 for elite runners and N1 million to N20,000 for local athletes. No Anambra State government officials attended the event, as the State Sports Development Commission held a concurrent “Walk for Life” event elsewhere.

=== Planned 2023 ===
A second edition was scheduled for September 30, 2023, expecting over 2,000 athletes, including five top-300 world-ranked elite runners and up to 20 other international participants. Organizers projected prizes of $400,000 for international athletes and N10 million for locals. Afia TV was named the official broadcaster, with live coverage on DSTV and GOTV. Former Liberian President George Weah was announced as a goodwill ambassador. The Anambra State Police Commissioner assured security. The event was postponed to November 25 and later cancelled.

== Route ==
The 21 km course starts at Shoprite Mall and passes landmarks including Dennis Memorial Grammar School, Oguta Road, New Cemetery Road, Head Bridge, Upper Iweka, Nkpor Junction, and Awka Road, finishing at Chuba Ikpeazu Stadium near the Obi of Onitsha's Palace. The flat terrain is noted for its suitability for fast times.

== Organization and partnerships ==
The marathon is managed by the Onitsha Business School under Professor Olusegun Sogbesan. Partners include Afia TV, GLS Projects, Y&T Sports, and security agencies. In 2023, the event gained support from the Anambra State government and the Anambra Sports Development Commission. A potential N400 million five-year sponsorship deal was lost due to lack of state endorsement during the 2019 edition.

== See also ==
• List of marathon races in Africa

• Athletics in Nigeria
