= Okechukwu Oku =

Nigerian film producer, director and cinematographer

- Born: Okechukwu Oku; Enugu, Enugu State, Nigeria
- Other names: Okey Oku, the Oracle
- Citizenship: Nigerian
- Occupations: Film producer, director, cinematographer
- Years active: 2001 – present
- Notable work: Bambitious
- Spouse: Queendalyn Oku
- Children: 4

Okechukwu Oku, also known as Okey Oku and nicknamed "the Oracle", is a Nigerian film producer, director, cinematographer and occasional musician. He is best known for directing the movies Love and Oil (2014), Burning Bridges (2014) and Bambitious (2014) which featured Belinda Effah and Daniel K Daniel.

== Early life ==
Oku was born in Enugu, the capital city of Enugu State, south-eastern Nigeria and is the second of eleven children of Goddy and Winifred Oku. He is of Igbo descent and hails from Ukpo in Dunukofia local government area of Anambra State, south-eastern Nigeria. His father, Goddy was a popular Nigerian musician in the 1970s and his mother Winifred Oku is a retired Nigerian Civil Servant. Oku’s younger brother, Udoka 'Selebobo' Oku, is a music producer and singer.

Oku began his formal education at the WTC Primary School in Enugu and went on to St. Charles Special Science School, Onitsha, Anambra State. Halfway through his University education, Oku left school to pursue his passion in the arts; Oku immersed himself in music, recording a few gospel tracks of his own and producing music for a number of musicians in Southeast Nigeria, Oku eventually veered into the art of music video directing.

== Career ==
In 2001, Oku began shooting music videos for a number of music performers from South-Eastern Nigerian including Resonance (Lee Lee), Flavour N'abania (Ada Ada) and SeleBobo. His love for cinematography grew stronger thus leading to his gradual venture into feature film production in 2011.

Oku began working as a cinematographer and film editor in 2011 and worked on a number of African movies including The Great Niger Mission (2011, Nigeria), Brother's Keeper (2012, Nigeria), Jafaar (2012, Nigeria), Reflection (2012, Sierra Leone), Last 3 Digits (2012, Nigeria), Refugee (2013, Ghana), and The Duplex (2013, Nigeria).

In 2013, Oku began directing and producing his own feature films; Love and Oil (2014, Nigeria), Burning Bridges (2014, Nigeria), The Bible (2014, Nigeria), The Boss is Mine (2016, Nigeria), and Black Rose (2016, Nigeria, released 2018)

His work as an Editor and Cinematographer in the 2014 Feature Film, Brother's Keeper earned him nominations at the 2013 Golden Icons Academy Movie Awards for Best Cinematography, as well as the 2014 Nollywood Movies Awards for Best Editing.

In 2015, Oku received several awards at the Afrifimo Awards and Film /Music Festival including the award for Best Film Director, Best Cinematographer and Best Video Editor. His movie Bambitious, which features Nigerian Actor Daniel K Daniel, also took home the gong for Best Independent Film and Best Romance

In December 2015, Oku was nominated for Best Cinematographer for a Movie or TV Series at the 2016 African Magic Viewers' Choice Awards (AMVCA) for the film The Refugees.

== Personal life ==
Oku is married to Queendalyn Oku. They have three children and live in Enugu, Nigeria.

== Filmography ==
Feature Films

Year	Title	Major Cast	Role	Notes
2012	Brother's Keeper	Omoni Oboli, Beverly Naya, Majid Michel, Barbara Soki	Cinematographer, Editor	Feature Film, nominated for the 2014 Nollywood Movies Awards for Best Editing and also for the 2013 Golden Icons Academy Movie Awards for Best Cinematography
2012	Last 3 Digits	Nonso Diobi, Sidney "Dr. Sid" Esiri, Yomi Blaq, Rachel Oniga	Director of Photography	Feature Film, won Best International Film Award
2013	Finding Mercy	Rita Dominic, Blossom Chukwujekwu, Chioma Akpotha	Director of Photography	Feature Film, Africa Movie Academy Award - Best Actor, Nollywood Movie Award - Best Rising Star, Nigerian Entertainment Award - Best Supporting Actor
2014	Love and Oil	Yul Edochie, Nuella Njubigbo, Jibola Dabo, Chinaza Ekezie	Director	Feature Film
2014	Burning Bridges	Ivie Okujaye, Ken Erics, Esther Audu	Director	Feature Film
2014	Bambitious	Belinda Effah, Bucci Franklin, Daniel K Daniel, Ebele Okaro-Onyiuke	Director, Cinematographer, Editor	Feature Film, won multiple awards at the AAFMF
2014	Refugees	Yvonne Nelson, Belinda Effah, Diana Yekinni, Sandra Don Dufe, Ross Fleming, David Chin	Cinematographer	Feature Film, nominated for Best Cinematography at the 2016 AMVCA
2014	Chetanna	Chigozie Atuanya, Queen Nwokoye	DP, Editor	Feature Film, nominated for Best Igbo Film at the 2014 AMVCA and won GIAMA Awards for Best Indigenous Film
2016	The Boss Is Mine	Ime Bishop Umoh	Director	
2016	A Better Family	Frederick Leonard, IK Ogbonna	Director, DP, Editor	Feature Film, released on YouTube
2016	Excess Luggage	IK Ogbonna, Mike Ezuronye, Queen Nwokoye	DP, Editor	Feature Film, nominated for the BON Awards for Best Comedy and a Toronto Film Festival Official Selection
2016	Jofran	IK Ogbonna, Lisa Omorodion	Producer, Director, DP, Editor	Feature Film, Africa Magic Original Film
2016	Let's hit the Streets	Alex Ekubo, IK Ogbonna	Director, DP, Editor	Feature Film
2016	Tommy and Kenny	Belinda Effah, Buchi Franklin	Director, DP, Editor	Feature Film
2017	Dirty Laundry	Zach Orji, Kalu Ikeagu	Producer, Director, DP, Editor	Feature Film, Africa Magic Original Film
2017	American Driver	Evan King, Jim Iyke, Anita Chris, Nse Ikpe Etim, Nadia Buari, Emma Nyra, Ayo Makun, Laura Heuston, McPc the Comedian, Michael Tula, Andie Raven	Cinematographer	Feature Film, won Best Comedy at The People's Film Festival in 2017
2017	Sarah's Epiphany	Daniella Okeke, Mike Ezuruonye, Anthony Monjaro	Director	Feature Film
2018	Black Rose	Amaka Aneke, Chisom Asadu, Ngozi Ezeonu, Nancy Isime	Director	Drama / Romance
2019	Levi	Ramsey Nouah, Nancy Isime, Deyemi Okanlawon	Director/Producer/Editor	Feature Film
2020	30 and Single	Emmanuella Iloba, Monica Friday, Amaka Chukwujekwu	Director	Comedy / Romance

Music Videos

- Lee Lee (Resonance)
- Ada Ada (Flavour N'abania)
- Yoyo (Selebobo)

== Accolades ==
Year	Award	Category	Film	Result
2013	2013 Golden Icons Academy Movie Awards	Best Cinematography	Brother's Keeper	Nominated
2014	2014 Nollywood Movies Awards	Best Editing	Brother's Keeper	Nominated
2015	Afrifimo Awards and Film /Music Festival	Best Film Director	Bambitious	Won
2016	Africa Magic Viewers' Choice Awards (AMVCA)	Best Cinematographer for a Movie or TV Series	Refugees	Nominated
2018	Zulu African Film Academy Awards (ZAFAA)	Best Film Editor	Black Rose	Won

== See also ==
- List of Nigerian film producers
