= Bambitious =

2014 Nigerian romantic drama film

- Film poster
- Directed by: Okechukwu Oku
- Produced by: Queendalyn Oku; Okechukwu Oku
- Starring: Daniel K Daniel; Belinda Effah
- Edited by: Okechukwu Oku
- Production company: Oracle Films
- Release date: 29 November 2014
- Running time: 84 minutes
- Country: Nigeria

Bambitious is a 2014 Nigerian romantic drama film directed by Okechukwu Oku, starring Daniel K Daniel and Belinda Effah. It had its premiere at Genesis Cinema, Enugu State and was reputed to being the first Nollywood film to be screened in Southeastern Nigeria. Pete Edochie, Zack Orji and John Okafor were present at the ceremony.

== Cast ==
- Daniel K Daniel as Jerry
- Belinda Effah as Bambi
- Ebele Okaro as Dr. Ese
- Bucci Franklin as Frank
- Hekka Hedet as Funmi Coker
- Uju Anikwe as Nurse
- Idongesit Bruno as Ifeoma
- Sophie Ogoejiofor as Bartender

== Plot ==
The film begins with two lovers, Bambi (Belinda Effah) and Frank (Bucci Franklin) at a swimming pool. Frank is more interested in his books, while Bambi was in the pool. This got her irritated and they decide to go home. While at Frank's residence, Bambi nags around Frank inability to be financially buoyant to his distaste. Several days later, after a brief disagreement the couple decides to go separate ways to the regret of Frank. After a while, Bambi began dating Jerry (Daniel K. Daniel), a wealthy man from a reputable family. On getting to know of her new found love, Frank decides to blackmail her after the discovery that she's expecting a child. Bambi paid him 250,000 naira to keep her secret between them but had to introduce him as the boyfriend of her friend. Jerry and Frank get along so well that Jerry decides to use Frank as his best man during his wedding. Jerry's former girlfriend, Funmi Coker (Hekka Hedet), is still interested in Jerry attempts to use Frank to get back to Jerry. Jerry's mother, Dr. Ese (Ebere Okaro), who is against sex before marriage fell out with Bambi upon discovery that she was pregnant for Frank and seduced Jerry to sleep with her.

== Reception ==
The film received negative reviews from talkafricanmovies.com, a review site that either "recommends" or "eject" films. It denounced the "predictability" and "formulaic" nature of the film. It also played down the description of Bambi as "ambitious", when she was jobless and only concerned about marrying a wealthy man. It particularly faulted the storyline and the message the film was aiming to pass across. It recommended "Golddiggerlicious" as a more appropriate title for the film. It also described the story as "flat" but praised the believability of the acting. It concluded its review by ejecting the film, meaning it is not recommended.

Oluwatoyosi Agbaje for tns.ng praised the "straight-to-the-point" storyline and was excited seeing Frank having roles outside Tinsel and Ay's Crib. However, it highlighted the lack of genuineness in the manner Bambi discovered her pregnancy, particularly because she did not visit a hospital. It concluded its review by saying the "film was good".
