= Yahoo+ =

2022 Nigerian crime film

- Directed by: Ebuka Njoku
- Written by: Ebuka Njoku
- Produced by: Lorenzo Menakaya; Ebuka Njoku
- Starring: Ken Erics; Echelon Mbadiwe; Somadina Adinma; Lorenzo Menakaya
- Edited by: Femd Daniel
- Production companies: Media 23; Aguocha
- Distributed by: Filmone
- Release dates: 17 November 2021 (ENIFF); 1 July 2022 (Nigeria)
- Running time: 84 minutes
- Country: Nigeria
- Languages: English; Igbo

Yahoo+ is a 2022 Nigerian crime film directed by Ebuka Njoku and produced by Lorenzo Menakaya and Njoku. It stars Ken Erics, Somadina Adinma, Echelon Mbadiwe, Ifeoma Obinwa and Lorenzo Menakaya. It was released in July 2022.

== Synopsis ==
The film narrates the journey of two childhood friends who aspire to make it in Nollywood, but turn to fraud as a secondary means of income. It draws inspiration from the phenomenon of online fraud, commonly referred to as "Yahoo Yahoo," which is often associated with the use of black magic.

Kamso a young woman, seeks to borrow money from her friend to send funds to her boyfriend. Her friend Pino-Pino, who is a prostitute, agrees to lend her the money on the condition that Kamso accompanies her to work that night. After initially refusing, Kamso reluctantly agrees.

Upon arriving at the location, Kamso discovers that her boyfriend, Abacha, is one of the clients. Heartbroken, she locks herself in a room.

== Cast ==
- Echelon Mbadiwe as Kamso
- Ken Erics as Ikolo
- Somadina Adinma as Abacha
- Lorenzo Menakaya as Mansa
- Keezyto as Ose
- Ifeoma Obinwa as Pino-Pino

== Release ==
In November 2021, Yahoo+ premiered at the Eastern Nigeria International Film Festival. It was released in Nigerian cinemas on July 1st, 2022, and was released on Netflix in June 2023. It is distributed by Filmone Entertainment. The film was originally announced with a release date after unveiling its final trailer on February 22, 2022.
