= Shadow Parties =

2021 Nigerian political drama film

- Directed by: Yemi Amodu
- Screenplay by: Ade Derek Adeniji; Yemi Amodu
- Produced by: Yemi Amodu; Doyin Amodu
- Starring: Yemi Blaq; Omotola Jalade-Ekeinde; Toyin Abraham; Jide Kosoko; Sola Sobowale; Magdalena Korpas; Lucien Morgan
- Cinematography: Lukman Abdulrahman
- Edited by: Kazeem Oyewo
- Music by: Franklin Israel
- Distributed by: Netflix
- Release date: 6 September 2021
- Running time: 116 minutes
- Country: Nigeria
- Language: English

Shadow Parties is a 2021 Nigerian political drama film directed and produced by Yemi Amodu. The film stars Yemi Blaq, Omotola Jalade-Ekeinde, Toyin Abraham, Jide Kosoko, Sola Sobowale, Magdalena Korpas, and Lucien Morgan. It premiered on Netflix on 6 September 2021.

== Plot ==
The theme of the film revolves around a communal clash in which Aremu from Aje, a town that neighbours Iludun, where his wife, Arike was born, well known for fratricidal wars, which had claimed the lives of Arike's parents. The two towns were thrown into war after the kinsmen of Aremu decided to burn his wife and child alive claiming she was an enemy which then triggered reprisal attacks from the Iluduns led by Lowo, Arike's brother.

== Cast ==
- Toyin Abraham as Arike
- Toyin Adegbola as Queen of Aje Land
- Yemi Blaq as Owuteru
- Omotola Jalade-Ekeinde as Princess Fadekemi
- Romoke Ajayi as Queen of Iludun Land
- Segun Arinze as Chief Obanla
- Saheed Balogun as Akuwe
- Jibola Dabo as King of Aje Land
- Ken Erics as Aremu
- Gbemisola Faleti as Akanji
- Chris Iheuwa as Ben Akuga
- Magdalena Korpas as Atilola's Wife
- Jide Kosoko as Chief Atilola
- Sola Kosoko as Asabi
- Lola Lawal as Nurse
- Rotimi Makinde as King of Iludun Land
- Lucien Morgan as Ian
- Tunde Oladimeji as Ayinla
- Hafiz Oyetoro as Bogumbe
- Rotimi Salami as Akinola
- Jimi Solanke as Akanji's Father
- Sola Sobowale as Amoke
- Bode Sowande as Professor

== Awards and nominations ==
Year	Award	Category	Result	Ref
2021	Africa Movie Academy Awards	Achievement in Production Design	Nominated	
2021	Africa Movie Academy Awards	Best Nigerian Film	Nominated	
