= Mercy Ima Macjoe =

Mercy Macjoe
- Born: Mercy 'Ima' Macjoe; June 20, 1993 (age 33); Lagos, Lagos State, Nigeria
- Education: Mass Communication, Nigerian Open University.
- Alma mater: Nigerian Open University.
- Occupations: Actress, producer, entrepreneur
- Years active: 2011 – present
- Notable work: Girl Next Door

Mercy Ima Macjoe, born June 20, 1993, better known as Mercy Macjoe, is a Nigerian actress, film producer, and entrepreneur. She was born and raised in Lagos but hails from Akwa Ibom State. Mercy is best known for her roles in Magdalene and Jenna, which earned her prestigious awards. In 2018, she was nominated for the Best Supporting Actress award at the City People Awards and received the award for Best Independent Short Film at the Hollywood and African Prestigious Awards in 2019.

== Early life ==
Her father, who died when she was very young, leaving her to be raised primarily by her mother, was a soldier from Eket in Akwa Ibom state. Macjoe attended the Nigerian Open University, where she studied Mass Communication for her second degree.

== Career ==
=== Acting ===
Mercy Macjoe began her film career in 2011, with a role in the movie Lonely Princess alongside veteran actor Mercy Johnson. She has since then had feature roles the movies Midnight Crew, Zenith of Love, Shame, Bread of Life, Girl Next Door and Flaws. Early in her career, Macjoe featured in a considerable number of Ghanaian movie productions. In 2018, her performance as a tomboy in the movie Jenna received rave reviews and attention from fans and critics alike. In 2020, Macjoe enrolled at the New York Film Academy.

Following her studies at the New York Film Academy, Macjoe continued to feature in Nollywood productions as a film producer, from her production company MMJOE PRODUCTION she's produced movies like Red, The love i lost , Blind marriage, Last day Married and has expanded her career into entrepreneurship and business management. In April 2026, she completed an executive education program at Harvard Business School Outside of filmmaking, she ventured into the hospitality industry, establishing and currently operating a restaurant, Lemon and Thyme Macjoe's, located in Boston, Massachusetts. She has remained active in film making starring in releases such as Last Day Married, Cold dish, Bigger fish, 30 and single, Blind marriage, and Sharing London a new movie soon to be realised

=== Production ===
In 2018, she began producing her own feature films with the production of Red, which premiered on Ibaka TV, featuring Nonso Diobi, Ifeanyi Kalu and Macjoe in a lead role. In 2019, she produced three feature films, 30 and Single, shot in London, Love in a Puff and Passion’s Promise.

== Awards and recognition ==
Year	Event	Prize	Recipient	Result
2016	Scream Awards	Film Revelation of the year (Female)	Mercy Macjoe	Won
2017	City People Movie Awards	Best new Actress	Mercy Macjoe	Nominated
2018	City People Movie Awards	Best Supporting Actress - Female	Mercy Macjoe	Nominated
2018	CA Award, London	Best Actor (Female)	Mercy Macjoe	Won
2019	Humanitarian Award	Celebrity Entrepreneur of the Year	Mercy Macjoe	Won
2019	GMYT African Humanitarian Award	Most Stylish Celebrity of the Year	Mercy Macjoe	Won
2019	Hollywood and African Prestigious Awards, Los Angeles	Best Independent Film (African)	Love in a Puff	Won
2024	The Dcemaward Atlanta Georgia	Best International Producer And Best Actress	Mercy Macjoe	Won

== Filmography ==
=== Selected filmography ===
- Jenna
- "30 and single (2026)"
- "Blind marriage (2026)
- "Last Day Married Featuring Maurice Same (2025)
- " Cold Dish (2025)
- "Bigger Fish (2025)
- Midnight Crew
- "the Love I lost
- Zenith of Love
- Shame
- Bread of Life
- Girl Next Door
- Flaws (2016) as Berna
- Magdalene
- Red (2019)
- Obsessed alongside Daniel K Daniel
- Wedding Eve (2017) as Roli
- Forbidden Pleasure
- Somewhere in Hell
- Body of a Virgin
- Moonwalker
- Bonded by Fate
