= Ujuaku Akukwe =

Nigerian documentary filmmaker

- Education: University of Nigeria, Nsukka; New York Film Academy
- Website: www.ujuaku.com

Obianujuaku Nwakalor-Akukwe is a Nigerian documentary filmmaker. She is a founder of the Eastern Nigeria Film and Arts Initiative (ENFAI) and the Festival Director of the Eastern Nigeria International Film Festival, which holds annually in southeast Nigeria. Her films focus on cultural heritage. Akukwe is a TEDx speaker and the author of the book, "Nuts and Bolts of Parenting". Her film, Afia Attack, won the Documentary Short Length Award at the 2017 Silicon Valley African Film Festival.

== Education ==
Akukwe attended the University of Nigeria, Nsukka, graduating in Social Works in 1999. In 2012, she graduated from Entrepreneurship Management, Pan-African University, Lagos State, Nigeria. Akukwe earned a degree in Film Producing from the New York Film Academy Los Angeles, United States of America in 2015.

== Career ==
Akukwe co-founded the Eastern Nigeria Film and Arts Initiative (ENFAI) and began the Eastern Nigeria International Film Festival in November 2020. As part of the 4th Edition of the film festival, Akukwe organized a workshop which had a session led by Frank Nweke Jnr. In a previous edition, the veteran actor, Pete Edochie, won the Lifetime achievement award. Akukwe became the global creative director of Innovate Africa Corporation in January 2024. She is the founder of Francis Ashley Media productions, a Managing Partner of Leap Bound Entertainment Limited. Akukwe is a TEDx speaker (October 2018).

== Filmography ==
- Afia Attack- The Untold Stories of Women in the Nigeria-Biafra War - (the film was screened at The Brunei Gallery, SOAS, University of London, United Kingdom)
- Harvest of Pride (Iri Ji Ndi Igbo)
- Phallure Inc (Short Drama).

== Awards and nominations ==
| Year | Award | Category | Recipient | Result | Ref |
|---|---|---|---|---|---|
| 2017 | Silicon Valley African Film Festival | Documentary Short Length | Ujuaku Akukwe | Won | |

== Recognitions ==
She was honoured with the Nigeria Women Entrepreneur Award for her contribution to positive parenting through her project "Polishing the Diamonds". She also received a Certificate of Recognition from California State Legislature Assembly for using film as a vehicle for community engagement and education. Akukwe is a Fellow of the Acumen West Africa. She was given the Star Award (Lift Effects London, UK) for "Positively Touching Lives" and the Diamond Bank BET Scholarship.
