= Peggy Ovire =

Nigerian actress

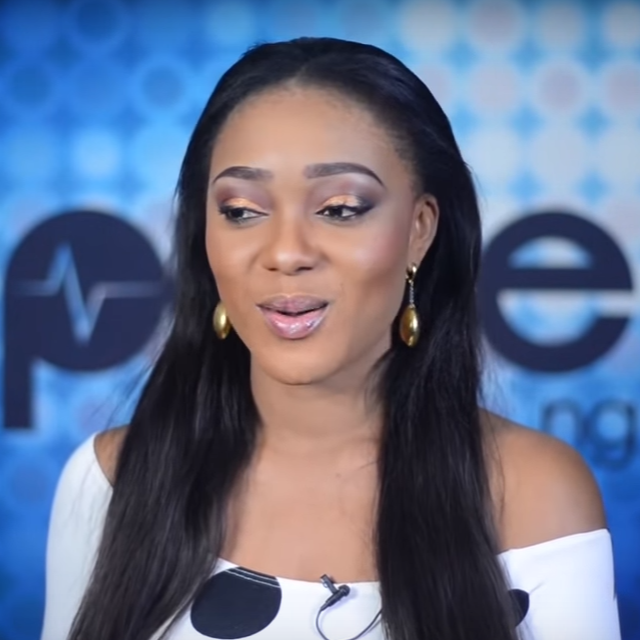
- Peggy Ovire in "Husbands of Lagos"
- Born: Peggy Ovire Enoho; 21 October 1976 (age 49); Surulere, Lagos State, Nigeria
- Citizenship: Nigeria
- Education: Banking and Finance, Ambrose Alli University
- Alma mater: Ambrose Alli University
- Occupation: Actress
- Years active: 2013–present
- Notable work: A Long Night
- Spouse: Frederick Leonard (married 2022 - present)
- Awards: Most Promising Actress Of The Year at the City People Entertainment Awards

Peggy Ovire Enoho addressed commonly as Peggy is a Nigerian model, movie producer and actress who won the award for “Most Promising Actress Of The Year (English)” at the City People Entertainment Awards 2015 edition.

== Early life and education ==
Ovire hails from Ughelli in Delta State, Nigeria. She was born into a family of six children of which she was the last born child of her parents. Ovire was born in Lagos state where she has been living for most part of her life. Ovire attended Itire Nursery and Primary School in Surulere and AUD Secondary School which is also situated in Surulere, Lagos State. Ovire, for her post-secondary school education enrolled in Delta State University, Abraka but eventually would complete it at Ambrose Alli University where she obtained a Bachelor of Science degree in Banking and Finance.

== Career ==
Ovire, before her debut into the Nigerian movie industry Nollywood, began her career as a model as she described in an interview with The Punch print media house. She further explained her first ever movie was one produced by Uche Nancy. Ovire’s movie career came into the limelight with her role in the TV series titled Husbands of Lagos. Ovire claimed the TV series brought her notability and she had become recognizable outside of her home country Nigeria. she was part of the cast crew in Rising Sun alongside Ifeanyi Kalu.

== Awards and nominations ==
- Ovire won the award for Most Promising Actress of the Year (English) at the 2015 City People Entertainment Awards.

== Movie production ==
In addition to being an actress and a model, Ovire is a film producer who has worked on films including Ufuoma, Fool Me Once, and The Other Woman.

Peggy made her entry as a movie producer with the release of the movie tittle Odogwu .......Titled Man, which came out in October, 2025. It featured Fredrick Leonard.

== Selected filmography and TV series ==
- A Long Night (2015) as Teller 1
- Royal Switch (2015)
- Game Changer (2015)
- Husbands of Lagos (TV series) (2015-2017) as Isioma
- Playing with Heart
- Marry Me Yes or No
- The Apple of Discord
- Last Engagement
- Second Chances (2014) as Lolade
- Baby boy (2017)
- Ghetto bred (2018)
- Grey (2019) as Mitchel
- Loving Ellen (2020)
- 11th thought (2019) as Sandra
- A taste of grief (2019) as Nora
- Long shadow (2019) as Eva
- Hell proof (2020)
- For better for trouble (2021) as Nancy
- Eva (2021) as Lady D
- Rising Sun (2022)
- Butterflies for Christmas (2022) as Mary
- Husband Hustlers (2023) as Kadeshia

== Personal life ==
In November 2022, she married fellow actor Frederick Leonard, although there have been rumours of a split.
