= Ebele Okaro =

Nigerian actress and film producer (born 1964)

- Born: 19 January 1964 (age 62); London, United Kingdom
- Other name: Ebele Okaro Onyiuke
- Citizenship: Nigerian
- Education: University of Calabar
- Occupations: Actress, Producer
- Notable work: Bambitious
- Awards: 2017 Africa Magic Viewers Choice Award, Best Supporting Actress

Ebele Okaro Onyiuke// (born 19 January 1964) is a Nigerian actress and film producer.

== Early life and education ==
Ebele Okaro was born on 19 January 1964 in London and raised in Enugu State, southeastern part of Nigeria. She began acting while attending the Santa Maria Primary School and continued while at Nsukka's Queen of the Holy Rosary Secondary School where she wrote her Senior Secondary School Certificate Examination (SSCE). Initially she began her studies in education at the University of Calabar (Unical), Cross River State, in the southern region of Nigeria, but later discovered that her passion was for the dramatic arts, leading her to earn a Bachelor's degree in Theatre Arts. Okaro's mother is a television producer and her father, an engineer who also has great interest in arts and literature.

== Career ==
After graduating from university, Okaro served her National Youth Service at the Nigerian Television Authority (NTA), where she made some television appearances. However, after the Youth Service, she worked with an embassy in Lagos and later in a bank before returning to acting in the Nigerian movie industry (known as Nollywood).

In 2014, Okaro produced and acted in Musical Whispers, a movie that advocates for loving care for children with autism. It featured other prominent Nigerian actors, most notably Chioma Chukwuka and Kalu Ikeagwu.

She has become known as the "Mama of Nollywood" and has earned the respect of both fans and colleagues. Ebele always knew she wanted to become an actress. Although she left acting for a short time when there was a huge decline in the Nigeria Movie Industry. It led her to earn a living somewhere else. She worked at an embassy in Lagos and also took up a Banking job at the time but when back to acting when things got better.

== Personal life ==
She married into the Onyiuke family.

== Awards and nominations ==
Year	Award	Category	Film	Result	Ref
2017	Africa Magic Viewers Choice Award	Best Supporting Actress	4-1 Love	Won	
2018	Africa Magic Viewers' Choice Awards	Best Supporting Actress	Black Rose	Nominated	
2019	Best of Nollywood Awards	Best Actress in a Supporting Role (English)	Black Rose	Won	
2020	Africa Magic Viewers' Choice Awards	Best Actress in a Comedy (Movie/TV Series)	Smash	Nominated	

== Filmography ==
Year	Title	Role	Director	Notes	References
	Eziza				
	Moving Fingers				
	Red Light				
	Shallow Waters				
	Third Eye				
1996	Hostages		Tade Ogidan		
2006	30 Days	Mama Alero	Mildred Okwo		
2009	Silent Scandals	Mrs. Helen Ubaka			
2014	Bambitious	Dr. Ese	Okechukwu Oku		
2014	Chetanna	Ugomma (as Ebere Okaro)	Ikechukwu Onyeka	Igbo language	
2014	Musical Whispers	Jasmine	Bond Emerua	Also the producer	
2015	The Powerful Babies	Chioma	Nonso Emekaekwue	Written by Greg Chyke Inawodoh and Ifeanyi Ononye	
2015	Road to Yesterday	Victoria's mum	Ishaya Bako		
2016	4-1-Love	Uju's Mother	Ikechukwu Onyeka	Best Supporting Actress in a Drama – 2017 Africa Magic Viewers Choice Awards	
2016	Three Wise Men	Yetunde	Pat Ogbere Imohbio		
2017	Karma	Mama Ngozi	Mayor Ofoegbu		
2017	What Lies Within	Mama	Vanessa Nzediegwu		
2018	Black Rose	Rose	Okey Oku		
2019	Living in Bondage: Breaking Free	Eunice Nworie	Ramsey Nouah		
2023	A Tribe Called Judah	grandma	Adeoluwa Owu and Funke Akindele		
2023	Blood Vessel	Ebi	Moses Inwang		
2024	Adam Bol	Grandmother	Cheta Chukwu and Almaz Alimzhanov	Action/Comedy	
2024	Out of Breath	Ezenwanyi	Obi Emelonye		
