= Somadina Adinma =

Nigerian actor (born 1999)

Somadina Harrison Adinma
- Born: Somadina Harrison Adinma; 8 May 1999 (age 27); Lagos, Nigeria
- Education: Nnamdi Azikiwe University
- Occupations: Actor, model, TV presenter
- Years active: 2002–present
- Known for: Ordinary Fellows, Breath of Anger, Forest of Promises
- Awards: Africa Movie Academy Award for the Best Performance by a child (Nominated)

Somadina Adinma // (born 8 May 1999) is a Nigerian actor and model. He is best known for his roles in the Nollywood films Ordinary Fellows, Breath of Anger, and Forest of Promises.

== Early life and career ==
Adinma is a native of Neni, Anambra State. He was born into a family of four but lost his father, leaving him, his mother, and his older brother as the surviving members of their nuclear family.

He started acting at the age of eight, making his debut in the comedy film Charge and Bail. In 2007, he was nominated for Best Performance by a Child at the 3rd Africa Movie Academy Awards.

He obtained a degree in theatre arts from Nnamdi Azikiwe University. In 2019, he acted in the drama film Ordinary Fellows in the role of DJ Cash.

== Controversy ==
Adinma previously dated Regina Daniels before she married Ned Nwoko. The news raised questions from his followers, who had thought that Daniels and Adinma would get married.

== Personal life ==
Adinma did his National Youth Service Corps (NYSC) programme in Nasarawa State.

== Awards and recognitions ==
Over the years, the actor Adinma has been nominated for a couple of awards such as:

- Best Child Actor at the Africa Movie Academy Award
- Most Promising Actor in Nigeria at the Africa Magic Viewers' Choice Award and
- Best New Act to Watch at the City People Entertainment Award.

== Filmography ==
=== Selected filmography ===
- Charge and Bail (2003) as Hezekiah
- End Point (2005) as Ikem 1
- Speak the Word (2006) as Solomon
- Breath of Anger (2007)
- Forest of Promises (2008)
- Flash of Pain (2016) as Ebube
- The Seventh Hour (2019) as Peter
- Love Child (2020) as Chiemela
- La Street (2020) as Wise
- Ikemefuna (2021) as Justice
- Yahoo+ (2022) as Abacha
- Enslaved Feelings (2022) as Beluchi
- A Pierced Heart (2022) as Afam
- Bad Post (2022) as Stan
- Trampled (2022) as Ifeanyi
- A Familiar Stranger (2022) as Desmond
- Enslaved Feelings (2022) as Beluchi
- A Troubled Heart (2023) as William
- Something About Him (2024) as Soma
- Hook Line & Sinker
- Gifted
- Miss Teacher
- Love and Oil
- My Best Friend Caused My Pain
- Spiteful Lovers
- Two Hearts
- In The Deep
