= Frederick Leonard (actor) =

Nigerian actor (born 1976)

- Born: Frederick Nnaemeka Leonard; 1 May 1976 (age 50); Anambra State, Nigeria
- Education: Kaduna Polytechnic
- Occupation: Actor
- Years active: 2007–Present

Frederick Nnaemeka Leonard, (born May 1, 1976) is a Nigerian actor who won the award for Best Supporting Actor in a movie at the Golden Icons Academy Movie Awards in 2014 and in 2016 won the City People Movie Award For Best Supporting Actor of the Year (English) at the City People Entertainment Awards.

== Early life and education ==
Leonard was born in Anambra State, Nigeria which is a south-eastern geographical area of Nigeria predominantly occupied by the Igbo people of Nigeria. He is the firstborn child of his parents in a family of four consisting of two children, a mother and a father. He received primary education in St Peter's Anglican Primary School, Alausa, Ikeja In Lagos State and attended Oregun High School in Oregun, Ikeja In Lagos State also for secondary education. In bid to obtain a degree he relocated to Kaduna State In Northern Nigeria and applied to Kaduna Polytechnic where he was accepted and eventually graduated with a degree in biochemistry. He is married to Peggy Ovire.

== Career ==
Leonard debuted his career into the Nigerian movie industry in 2001 where he played brief one scene roles and took a break from acting almost immediately after he debuted in order to complete his university education and obtain a degree. Upon completion of his university education, Leonard returned to the Nigerian movie industry referred to commonly as Nollywood in 2008 and obtained his first ever lead role in a movie titled Indian Doctor. In 2009, he ventured into the Nigerian TV soap opera series and featured in a TV series titled Disclosure which aired predominantly on Africa Magic on DSTV. Leonard debuted his career with a movie titled Grey and subsequently in 2019 produced a movie titled Void.

== Influence ==
Leonard credited Bimbo Akintola, a Nigerian female actress as one of the people who have influenced his acting style.

== Awards and nominations ==
Year	Award	Category	Work	Result	Ref
2014	Golden Icons Academy Movie Awards	Best Supporting Actor		Won	
2015	Golden Icons Academy Movie Awards	Best Actor		Nominated	
2016	City People Movie Award	Best Supporting Actor of the Year (English)		Won	
2016	Zulu African Film Academy Awards	Best Actor	Woeman	Won	

== Personal life ==
Leonard is an orphan and has spoken publicly about the devastating impact of losing both parents especially the death of his mother which he described as an unfortunate incident that has created a void in his life. Leonard in an interview with a Nigerian print media This Day, described himself as introvert and not the party type and also revealed that he doesn't drink nor smoke and maintains a very small circle of few friends and family. He married his long-time partner and colleague, Peggy Ovire, on November 19, 2022.

== Selected filmography ==
=== Films (partial) ===
- Maid of Honour (2024) as David
- Ghetto Heart (2024) as Kess
- Man in Love (2024) as Freddie
- A Father's Love (2024) as Frank
- Crushed (2023) as Tony
- Good Things (2023) as Oliver
- Stay (2022) as Dave
- On Her Terms (2022) as Jason
- Desperate son (2021)
- The Royal dignity (2021)
- A Perfect Past (2020) as Sly
- Our Jesus Story (2020) as Jesus Christ
- Void (2019) as Tonna
- The Reunion (2019)
- 40 Looks Good on You (2019)
- A Better Family (2018) as Nick
- In Every Way (2018) as Dominic
- Timid Timi (2017) as Daniel
- Discontent (2017) as Damian
- Promise Beyond (2016) as Victor Asare
- Monster Under Skin (2015)
- A Certain Night (2014) as John
- Accident (2013) as Chike
- Miss Queen (2012) as Richard
- 100% Secret (2012) as Collins
- Courtesy of Vengeance (2012) as Nkado
- Felicima: One Gift (2009) as Musa
- Plane Crash (2008) as Charles
- Indian Doctor (2008) as Chibuzor

== See also ==
- List of Nigerian actors
