= Yemi Amodu =

Nigerian actor, writer, dramatist, director, and producer

- Born: August 8, 1968 (age 58); Ibadan, Oyo state, Nigeria
- Citizenship: Nigerian
- Education: Olabisi Onabanjo University
- Occupations: Actor, writer, dramatist, director and producer
- Notable work: Erin lakatabu Shadow Parties

Yemi Amodu (born August 8, 1968) is a Nigerian actor, writer, dramatist, director, and producer. He has won several awards including NFVCB Director of Best Film of the Month in 2003, Best Director FNEI in 2006, Director/Producer, Best Indigenous Film, Abuja Film Festival 2008, and Director, Best Epic Film of the year, YOMAFA in 2011.

== Early life ==
Amodu was born in Ibadan, Oyo State, Nigeria. He received his primary education at Salvation Army and Methodist School and later attended Mafoluku Grammar School, Lagos, for his secondary education.

He started as an actor, a poet and a talking drummer in 1983 while in secondary school. Amodu holds a diploma and Bachelor of Arts degree in directing from Department of Performing Arts, Olabisi Onabanjo University.

He worked for his alma mater as an academic technologist teaching film production and its technicalities, and is the director of research and documentation for the Theatre Arts and Motion Picture Practitioners' Association of Nigeria.

== Career ==
Amodu joined Ace studio that later become DBN TV as a trainee editor in 1989. He later started craft of editing on U-Matic and Betacam SP. He also learned cinematography and sound.

He worked as a continuity manager, a sound recordist, production manager and assistant director before he produced his first movie, Evil Rise, which was shot on U-Matic in 1992.

He has directed music videos for the Nigerian artists Adewale Ayuba, Wale Thompson and Lanre Teriba (also known as Atorise).

In April 2014, Amodu indicated his desire to contest for the president of The Movie Ambassadors, TMA. He later stepped down for the eventual winner of the election, Saheed Balogun.

In 2017, Amodu's new work Shadows was approved by The Bank of Industry (BOI) Nigeria, to benefit from its multimillion Nollyfund project. The movie is directed by Ben Akugbe and scripted by Ade Adeniyi.

== Filmography ==
- Folashade
- Okiki
- Campus Girl
- Ndakobas(All Dwarf film)
- Matuwo
- Oju Kan Epa
- Obiri Oloja
- Owo Eje
- Ogun Abele
- Abente
- Ojo Oganjo
- Edungbalanja
- Afonja (2002) as a director and actor
- Erù elérù (2003)
- Ògédé Didùn (2003)
- Erin lakatabu (classified by BBFC) (2004) as a director and actor
- Lánléyìn (2004)
- Òwú ìyá (2004)
- Eto ikoko (2005)
- Òwú ìyá 2 (2005)
- Ladepo Omo Adanwo (2005)
- Alábàtà (2006)
- Sonibarin (2006)
- Asoko Peye (2008)
- Asoko peye 2 (2008)
- Obinrin Ale (2009)
- Omo Emi (2017) as Drunkard
- Shadow Parties (2021)

== Awards ==
1. NFVCB Director of Best Film of the Month 2003
2. Best Director FNEI 2006
3. Director/Producer, Best Indigenous Film, Abuja Film Festival 2008
4. Director, Best Epic Film of the Year, YOMAFA 2011
5. VCOAN Meritorious Award of Excellence 2012, Best Director of the Year, Afro Hollywood 2013
