= Ugezu J. Ugezu =

Nigerian actor

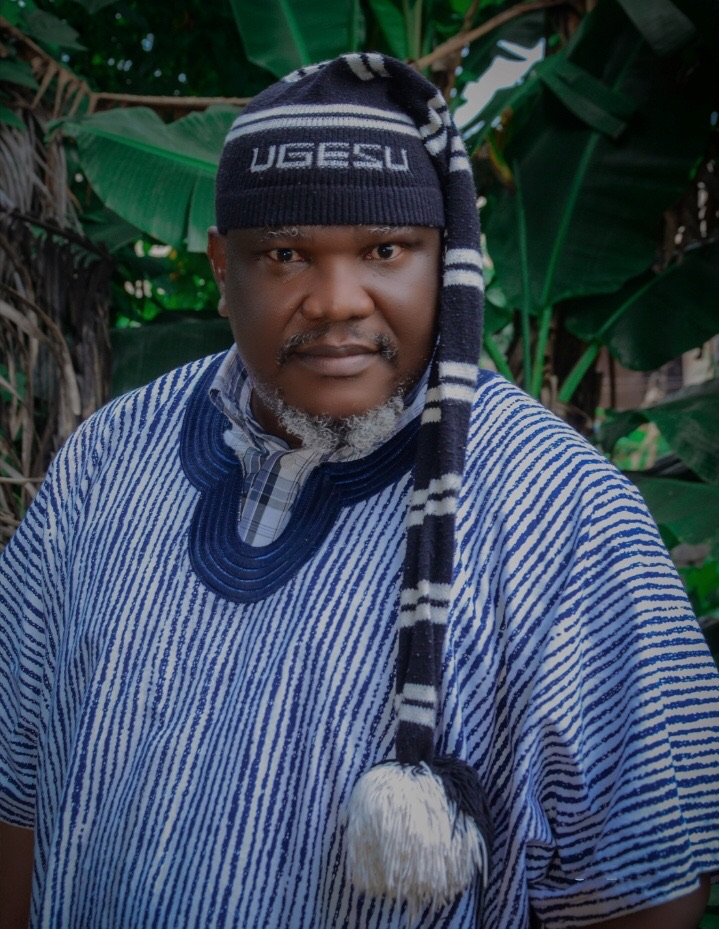
- Ugezu J. Ugezu
- Born: Ugezu Jideofor Ugezu; 19 October 1970 (age 55); Enugwu Ukwu , Anambra State, Nigeria
- Education: Enugu State University of Science and Technology, Enugu
- Occupations: Actor; writer; producer; musician
- Years active: 2000 — present

Ugezu Jideofor Ugezu professional known as Ugezu J. Ugezu is a Nigerian director, actor, screenwriter and producer. Ugezu is also a Highlife composer and singer.

== Early life ==
Ugezu was born in Enugwu Ukwu, Anambra state, Nigeria on 19 October 1970.

After he completed his primary school education, he went to Community Secondary School, Umueze Anam from 1982 to 1985 and also went to Fr. Joseph High School, Aguleri from 1986 to 1988 where he completed his secondary school education and obtained his senior school certificate.

Ugezu J. Ugezu got admission into the Enugu State University of Science and Technology popularly known as ESUT. It was in this institution where he acquired bachelor's degree in Public Administration.

== Career ==
Ugezu J. Ugezu has been active in the Nollywood industry since 2000 and has starred in more than 100 movies.

Ugezu writes, stars or directs movies that focus on the promotion of Igbo culture and tradition.

== Filmography ==
- Nothing for Nothing (2005) as Peter
- Made in Cambridge (2006) as Jacob
- Boys from Holland (2006) as Patrick
- Fools on the Run (2007)
- The Gods are Wise (2008)
- The Rainmakers (2009) as Donald
- Evil Manipulation (2010) as Moore
- Amnesty (2011) as Uche
- Jewels of the Sun (2011) as Priest
- Bridge of Contract (2012)
- The End is Near (2012)
- Hour of Salvation (2014)
- The Grave Dust (2015)
- Echoes of Love (2016) as Udo Obodo
- Akweke (2016) as Akpati Nsiegbe
- Circle of Fire (2017)
- Pretty Little Thing (2017) General Overseer
- Agony of a Sister (2018)
- Destinies (2019) as Francis
- Loyal King (2020)
- The Prime Minister (2022)
- Scaret Chance (2022) as Ichie Echezona
- Princess is Mine (2022)
- People's Club (2007)
