= 2018 Golden Movie Awards =

African film award ceremony

The 2018 Golden Movie Awards is an annual African award ceremony that seeks to honour individuals for their outstanding performance in movies they featured in as characters in the year under review. The ceremony was held at the Movenpick Ambassador Hotel in Accra. It was a star-studded event at the Movenpick Ambassador Hotel, which hosted filmmakers from Ghana, Nigeria, Uganda, and Ivory Coast for the 2018 Golden Movie Awards Africa. This year’s edition was hosted by popular Nigerian comedian AY and actress Joselyn Dumas.
