= Ebuka Njoku =

Nigerian filmmaker

Ebuka Njoku (May 30, 1992) is a Nigerian filmmaker, writer, and director. He is known for his first feature film, "Yahoo+," in which he worked as both the director and producer. He was born and raised in Eastern Nigeria, where he developed an early passion for storytelling, influenced by Nollywood and Bollywood films. Ebuka Njoku holds a Bachelor of Arts degree in Theatre and Film Studies from the University of Nigeria, Nsukka.

== Career ==
Njoku's fascination with movies began at a young age, with frequent visits to his neighbor's house to watch Hollywood, Bollywood, and Chinese films. His love for writing began during his teenage years, and he further pursued his passion at the University of Nigeria, Nsukka, where he studied Theatre Arts and Film. His screenplay, "Bola's Dirge," won the Homevida National Short Script competition in 2013, marking his introduction to Nollywood.

A few years later, in 2019 he created Crazy Lovely Cool; one of the first Nigerian series to appear on Netflix directed by Obi Emelonye. He co-wrote "Ordinary Fellows" in 2019. He made his directorial debut with the critically acclaimed feature film "Yahoo+" in 2022, which explores themes of cybercrime and societal pressures in Nigeria. The film premiered at The Annual Film Mischief festival, secured a distribution deal with FilmOne, and was released on Netflix, gaining widespread recognition. "Yahoo+" recently won the Best Narrative Feature award at the Eastern Nigeria International Film Festival.

In 2024, he wrote and directed 'UNO: The F in the family'. Later that year, he produced the YouTube movie "Okuko Christmas," a horror Christmas story.

Throughout his career, Njoku has collaborated with notable screenwriters and directors, including Yinka Ogun, Kemi Adesoye, Charles Novia, Ishaya Bako, and Onyeka Nwelue. His work on the Nigerian series "Crazy Lovely Cool," one of the first to appear on Netflix, further solidified his position as a rising star in Nollywood.

In November 2025, Njoku discussed the growth of vertical micro-dramas in Africa and the idea of a pan-African platform dedicated to vertical dramas in an interview with Duanju News.

== Filmography ==
- Bola's Dirge (2013)
- Ordinary Fellows (2019)
- Crazy, Lovely, Cool (2019)
- Yahoo+ (2022)
- UNO: The F in the family (2024)
- Okuko Christmas (2024)
