= Daniel K. Daniel =

Nigerian actor and model (born 1986)

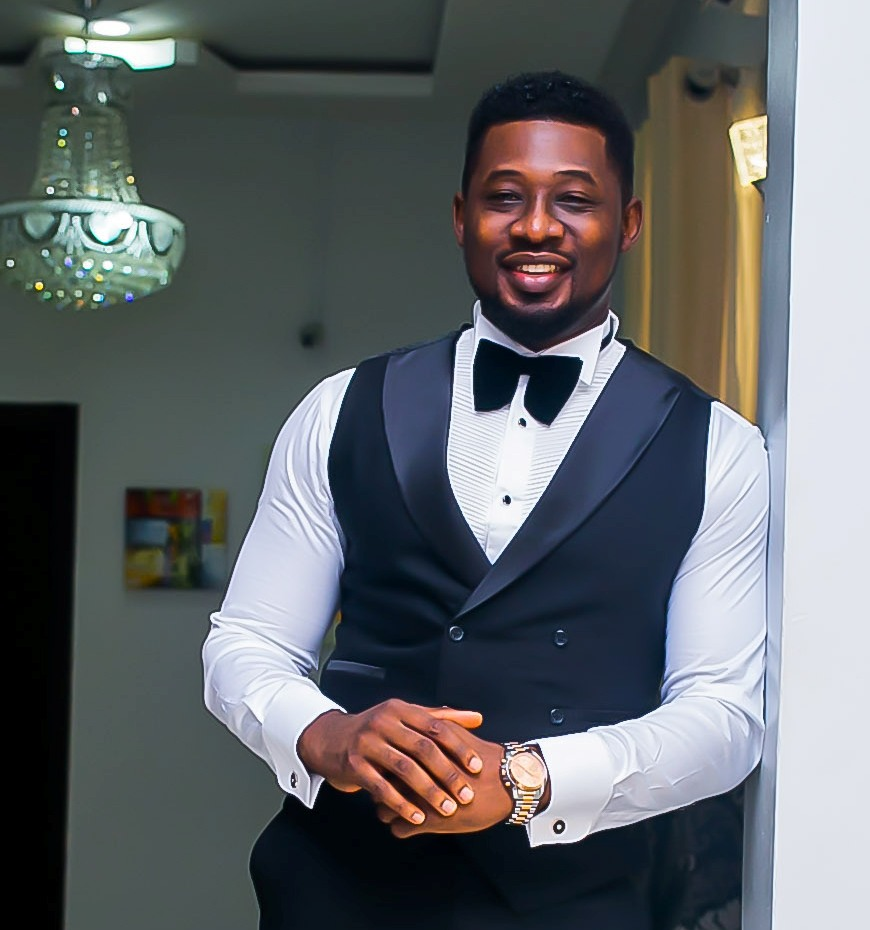
- Daniel K. Daniel in 2018
- Born: Daniel Kanayo Daniel; 22 May 1986 (age 40); Maiduguri, Borno, Nigeria
- Other name: DKD
- Occupations: Actor, model, voice-over artiste, events compere
- Years active: 2009 – present
- Awards: Africa Magic Viewers' Choice Awards; Africa Movie Academy Award
- Website: www.danielkdaniel.com

Daniel Kanayo Daniel (born 22 May 1986) is a Nigerian television and film actor, model, voice-over artiste and events compere. He is best known for his portrayal of Bossman in the movie A Soldier's Story, for which he won the 2016 Africa Magic Viewers' Choice Awards (AMVCA) and the Africa Movie Academy Awards (AMAA) awards for Best Actor, as well as his roles in the period piece 76, which also starred Ramsey Nouah, Chidi Mokeme and Rita Dominic and the light-hearted Mummy Dearest alongside veteran Nigerian actress Liz Benson. He was one of two Nollywood actors inducted into the Academy of Motion Pictures and Science class of 2022.

== Early life ==
Daniel Kanayo Daniel was born at the University of Maiduguri Teaching Hospital, Maiduguri, Borno State, in Northeastern Nigeria on May 22,1986.

While Daniel was a toddler, his family relocated to Lagos State in Southwest Nigeria and then to Enugu State in the southeast region of Nigeria, where he began his formal education. Daniel is of Igbo descent and is a native of Nenwe in Ani-Nri Local Government Area of Enugu State. He was brought up in a Christian home. His father, Chris Daniel was an engineer and his mother Kande Daniel is a Broadcast Journalist and former National President of Nigeria Association of Women Journalists, and currently serves as the Special Adviser to the Nigerian Minister of Power on Media Matters. He is the first of four children, one of whom is Chris Daniel Jnr (Kris'D) a musician and performing artist.

Daniel led the drama and debating club of his primary school, Command Children School. Almost always at the top of his class, he graduated into secondary school in 1996. He enrolled in Command Day Secondary School Enugu and later transferred to Federal Government College Enugu in 1999 to complete his senior secondary education.

Daniel had desired to train as a pilot, having had three role model fighter pilots in his family: his foster grandfather, former Chief of Air Staff, (Late) Air Marshal Ibrahim Alfa and his three uncles – Squadron Leader John Chukwu, Air Vice-Marshal Chris Chukwu, and Shu'aibu Alfa (a civil pilot). Daniel's hopes were dashed when he was diagnosed with myopia (short sightedness) and was told it would be difficult to achieve his dream with poor eyesight. At this time his father moved to Port Harcourt, Rivers State in South-south Nigeria, while his mother moved to the Federal Capital Territory (FCT) Abuja, on separate national assignments. He then got admission into the Nnamdi Azikiwe University Awka, Anambra State in 2004 to study Applied Biochemistry.

In November 2004, Daniel's life changed for good as he lost his father in a ghastly auto crash and being the first child, he had to grow up quickly. In 2005 his family relocated to Abuja after his father’s death in Port Harcourt while his studies continued in Nnamdi Azikiwe University where he also started his modelling career. He graduated from the university in 2009 and managed his uncle’s business Twinkles Catering Service, the pioneer eatery in Gusau, Zamfara State for four months.

== Career ==
Daniel started his modelling career while in school, doing a couple of Television commercials for Zandas Cosmetics. In 2009 when he returned to Abuja from the university, he took part in a few runway shows including the Abuja Moroccan Fashion Show. After one of the shows, Supermodel Steiner Eunice Opara, dragged a reluctant Daniel to a movie audition. The directors – Kabat Esosa Egbon and Tola Balogun were impressed by Daniel’s talent and gave him his very first acting job in the Television series All About Us.

He then got cast for a BBC (British Broadcasting Corporation) movie titled Sarah’s Choice, directed by Mak Kusare in which he starred alongside OC Ukeje, Seun Dada and Sylvia Oluchi. After the success of Sarah’s Choice, Daniel took on the role of the antagonist in the Amstel Malta Box Office produced movie, The Child, directed by Izu Ojukwu in which he starred alongside Joke Silva, Alex Usifo, Bukky Ajayi and Wole Ojo. Afterwards he gained the lead role in the hit movie, Ladies' Men, directed by Afam Okereke, also starring Mercy Johnson, Funke Akindele, Queen Nwokoye, Ruth Kadiri, Alex Ekubo, Chigozie Atuanya.

Daniel took a break from his newfound acting career in February 2010 to go for his National Youth Service, which is a mandatory requirement for Nigerian University graduates. He then worked with the Independent National Electoral Commission (INEC) in Abuja the Federal Capital Territory as part of his youth service.

He returned to acting in 2011 at the end of his Youth Service program and starred in a plethora of movies including Under which was shot in Ghana, Ivie, Same Difference, Paint My Life, Tempest, Lions of 76, Jujuwood, Body of the King, Book of Magic, Matchmaker, Spirit Girl, Devil in Red, Girl, Mummy Dearest, Bambitious and others. He has also starred in a number of Television Series such as My Treasure, Spider and Car Hire. Daniel was also part of the cast in the British Broadcasting Corporation (BBC) radio drama series – Story Story and Neighbor My Neighbor.

== Awards and recognitions ==
In 2014, Daniel was nominated for the City People Awards, Best New Actor of the Year category, an award he went on to win. Daniel was also nominated for the Best of Nollywood Awards (BON), Revelation of the Year Category in 2014, which he won

On 5 March 2016, Daniel won the Award for Best Actor in a (Drama) at the Africa Magic Viewers' Choice Awards (AMVCA) 2016 edition, for his role in the Nigerian war thriller A Soldier's Story. In the same year, Daniel also won the 12th Africa Movie Academy Awards award for Best Actor in a Leading Role for the same movie.

In June 2022, he and Funke Akindele were the only Nollywood actors invited into the Academy of Motion Pictures and Science class of 2022.

== Awards ==
Year	Event	Prize	Recipient	Result	Ref
2014	City People Awards	Best New Actor of the Year	Daniel K. Daniel	Won	
2014	Best of Nollywood Awards (BON)	Revelation of the Year	Daniel K. Daniel	Won	
2016	2016 Africa Magic Viewers Choice Awards	Best Actor in a (Drama)	Daniel K. Daniel	Won	
2016	12th Africa Movie Academy Awards	Best Actor	Daniel K. Daniel	Won	
2016	Golden Movie Awards	Best Actor	Daniel K Daniel	Nominated	
2016	Nigeria Entertainment Awards	Best Actor	Daniel K Daniel	Nominated	
2017	Best of Nollywood Awards	Best Kiss in a Movie	Daniel K Daniel	Nominated	
2018	Zulu African Film Academy Awards	Best Supporting Actor	Daniel K. Daniel	Won	
2020	2020 Best of Nollywood Awards	Best Actor in a Lead role – English	Daniel K. Daniel	Nominated	

== Filmography ==
=== Movie roles ===
Year	Title	Role	Director	Notes
2010	Ladies' Men	Bernard	Afam Okereke	Feature Film
2010	The Child	Oviawe	Izu Ojukwu	Feature Film (Amstel Malta Box Office Produced Film)
2010	Under 1 and 2	Dave	Nonso Emekaekwue	Feature Film
2010	Sarah’s Choice	Sub-lead	Mak Kusare	Feature Film (Produced by the BBC)
2012	Paint My Life/Tempest	Friday	Tchidi Chikere	Feature Film
2012	Lions of 76	Corporal Obi	Izu Ojukwu	Feature Film
2013	Book of Magic	Obinna	Nonso Ekene-Okonkwo	Feature Film
2013	Spirit Girl	Obinna	Nonso Ekene-Okonkwo	Feature Film
2014	Matchmaker	Opie	Solomon McAuley	Feature Film (MNet-Afriwood Production)
2014	Girl	Pita	Solomon McAuley	Feature Film (MNet-Afriwood Production)
2014	I'm Audrey	Esosa	Alex Mouth	Feature Film (MNet-Afriwood Production)
2014	Mummy Dearest	Chijioke Chinda	Willis Ikedum	Feature Film (Released in 2015)
2014	Almost Perfect	Major	Desmond Elliot	Feature Film (Yet to be released)
2014	A Long Night	Jude	Desmond Elliot	Feature Film (Yet to be released)
2014	Same Difference	Sam	Ehizojie Ojeshobolo	Feature Film
2014	Devil in Red	Bryan Okorie	Chucks-John Ejiofor	Feature Film
2014	Bambitious	Jerry Braide	Okechukwu Oku	Feature Film
2014	Fearless Lions	Ebube	Vincent D Anointed	Feature Film
2014	Chimobi (The Only Son)	Chimobi	Emeka Nnakihe	Feature Film
2015	Dise’s Secrets	Tony	Jay Franklyn Jituboh/Chris Odeh	Ebonylife TV Original Film
2015	Amiable	Dave	Stanlee Ohikhuare	Feature Film
2015	A Soldier's Story	Bossman	Frankie Ogar	Produced by Martin Gbados
2015	Perfectly Flawed	Lead Role	Chris Eneng	Africa Magic Original Film
2016	Schemers	Sub-Lead	Gbenga Salu	Produced by Grace Edwin Okon
2016	For the Wrong Reasons	Sub-Lead Role	Elvis Chuks	An Elvis Chuks Production
2016	Obsessed	Lead Role	Dabbie Chimere	Featuring Daniella Okeke, Mercy Ima Macjoe and Jorge Blaq.
2016	The Flute Boy	Lead	Amaechi Ukeje	Produced by Demek Movies
2016	The Brotherhood	Lead Role	Prince Emeka Ani	A Chez Movies Production
2016	What Goes Around	Lead	Sadiq Sule	Produced by Sadiq Sule
2016	Icheke Oku	Prince Agunannya	Emeka Amakeze	An Igbo Language Film
2016	Awele My Love	Lead	Victor Okoli	Produced by Kelechi Onwuchekwa
2016	Brother's Love	Lead	Ben Emeh	An Uzo Sele Production
2016	Chidera	Prince	Henry Mgbemele	An Igbo Language Film, Produced by Coruma Movies
2016	'76	Corporal Obi	Izu Ojukwu	2017 AMVCA Film of the Year
2016	Eye of Love	Chukwudinigbo	Ugezu J Ugezu	Produced by Trust in God Productions
2016	Oloibiri	Lieutenant Yisa	Curtis Graham	Produced by Rogers Ofime
2017	Saved by Love	Ezinne	Ifeanyi Azodoh	Produced by Great Films
2017	A Day Outside	Lead	Ilochi Olisaemeka	Produced by Happy Julian
2017	Heavy in the Game	Lead	Evans Osigwe	Produced by Evans Osigwe
2017	Scorned	Bosun	Tokunbo Ahmed/Asurf Oluseyi	Produced by Tokunbo Ahmed and Chris Martin
2017	Broken Reed	Lead	Kabat Esosa Egbon	Produced by Daniel Imasuen
2017	The Guardian	Smoke	Kabat Esosa Egbon	A Divine Images Production
2017	Black Widow	Jide	Chibuike Ike	Produced by Chibuike Ike
2017	Hell or High Water	Sub-Lead	Asurf Oluseyi	A TIERS Production
2018	Mummy Dearest 2	Lead	Willis Ikedum	
2018	Talking Dolls	Lead	Sukie Oduwole	Produced by Marc Adebesin
2018	After Dark	Sub-Lead	Chris Eneaji	IrokoTV
2018	Low Lifes and High hopes	Sub-Lead	Bright Osafamwen	A Frankie Ogar Production
2018	Lagos Landing	Richard	Theo Okpa	Feature film
2018	Paradise	Kraft	Daniel Oriahi	Produced by Ijeoma Grace Agu
2019	The Wedding Gown	Lead	Edward Uka	Produced by UcheNnanna
2019	The Fugitive	Lead	Andy Boyo	
2019	The Oblivion	Lead	Ndave Njoku	Produced by Colette Nwadike
2019	The Clash	Lead	Goodnews Isika	An IrokoTV Production
2019	Let Karma	Lead	Biodun Stephen	Produced by Aisha Mohammed
2019	Why Not	Maxwell	Paul Apel	Produced by Defo Productions.
2020	Akpe	Sub-Lead	Toka Mcbarbor	Produced by Ushbebe
2020	A Soldier's Story 2 - Return from the Dead	Lead role as Bossman	Frankie Ogar	Feature film
2020	Easy Money	Chief Fernández	Daniel Oriahi	Feature film by Red Carpet Films
2021	The Greener Pastures	Lead	Saint Stephen Pitees	Feature film
2022	The Drone that Saved Christmas	Prime Minister of Senegal	Miriam Bavly	Feature film by Breakout Music

=== Television roles ===
Year	Title	Role	Director	Notes
2010	My Treasure	Lead	Livinus Otteh	TV series
2011	Away from Home	Lead	Wonder Obasi	TV series
2013	Car Hire	Kola Sweeny	Frankie Ogar	EbonyLife TV Series
2015	Pulse	William	Paul Igwe	TV series
2016	How to Die in an African Home	Papa	Daniel K Daniel	Web Series featuring Etinosa Idemudia
2017	Professor John Bull	Guest Star	Tchidi Chikere	TV series (produced by Globacom)
2017	Tinsel	Guest Star	Africa Magic Series	TV series
2022	Diiche	Nnamdi Nwokeji	James Omokwe	TV series
