= Emeka Mba =

Nigerian media and communications executive

Emeka Nkem Mba
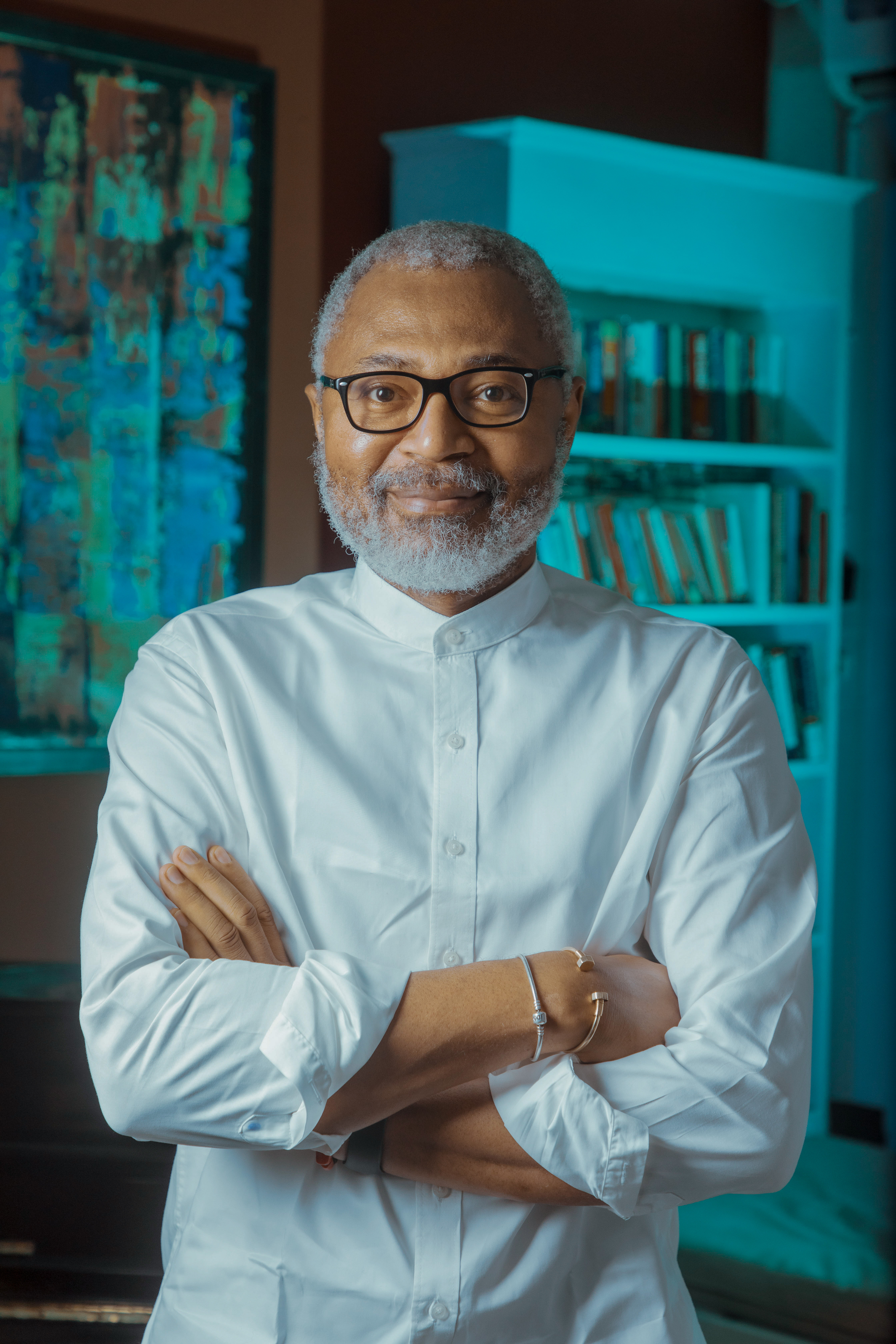
- Mba in 2023

Director-General, National Broadcasting Commission

Chief Executive Officer
- In office May 2013 – February 2016
- Preceded by: Yomi Bolarinwa
- Succeeded by: Modibbo Kawu

Director-General, Nigerian Film and Video Censors Board
- In office 2005–2013

Personal details
- Born: 30 August 1967 (age 58) Nigeria
- Education: B.Sc. in Mass Communication – Enugu State University of Science and Technology; Advanced Management Program (Media and Entertainment Management) – IESE Business School, New York; Executive education in Strategic Management of Regulatory and Enforcement Agencies – Harvard Kennedy School
- Occupation: Media executive, communications executive
- Known for: Broadcasting and film regulation in Nigeria

Emeka Nkem Mba (born 30 August 1967) is a Nigerian media and communications executive, recognised for his leadership roles in Nigeria's broadcasting and film regulation sectors. He served as the Director-General of the National Broadcasting Commission (NBC) from May 2013 to February 2016, and previously held the position of Director-General at the Nigerian Film and Video Censors Board (NFVCB) from 2005 to 2013.

== Education ==
Emeka Mba holds a Bachelor of Science degree in Mass Communications from Enugu State University of Science and Technology, Nigeria. He further enhanced his studies with an Advanced Management Program (AMP) diploma in Media and Entertainment Management from the IESE Business School in New York. He also completed executive education in Strategic Management of Regulatory and Enforcement Agencies at Harvard University’s John F. Kennedy School of Government.

== Career ==
Mba began his journey in 1996 with Multichoice Nigeria Limited as the Content and Regulatory Affairs Manager. He was later appointed as the Director-General of the National Film and Video Censors Board (NFVCB) in 2005.

In 2013, President Goodluck Jonathan appointed Mba as the Director-General of the Nigerian Broadcasting Commission (NBC), the regulatory body for Nigeria's broadcasting industry. His appointment was part of efforts to drive Nigeria's transition from analog to digital broadcasting. During his tenure at NBC, Mba led Nigeria's Digital Switch Over (DSO) process and worked to update broadcasting codes and regulations.

Mba has also held the position of Managing Director at Phillips Media Entertainment Ltd, a specialized media consulting firm, and currently heads Questech Media, a media and entertainment consulting practice.

Currently, Mba is the CEO of Afia TV, the first television channel from Nigeria’s Southeast region to be carried on major platforms such as DStv and GOtv.
