= Nigerian Broadcasters Merit Awards =

Nigerian annual award

- Awarded for: Excellence in broadcast achievements
- Country: Nigeria
- First award: October 31, 2010
- Currently held by: Crystal Pearl Communications
- Website: www.nbmawards.com

Nigerian Broadcasters Merit Awards are presented annually to recognize excellence of professionals in the African/Nigerian broadcast industry. The maiden edition of the awards was held on October 31, 2010. The pioneer award for the broadcasters was the idea of Omogbolahan Akinwumi, formerly known as Kazeem Popoola, the chief operating officer of the Reality Entertainment/Crystal Pearl Communications.
