= Belinda Effah =

Nigerian actress and presenter (born 1984)

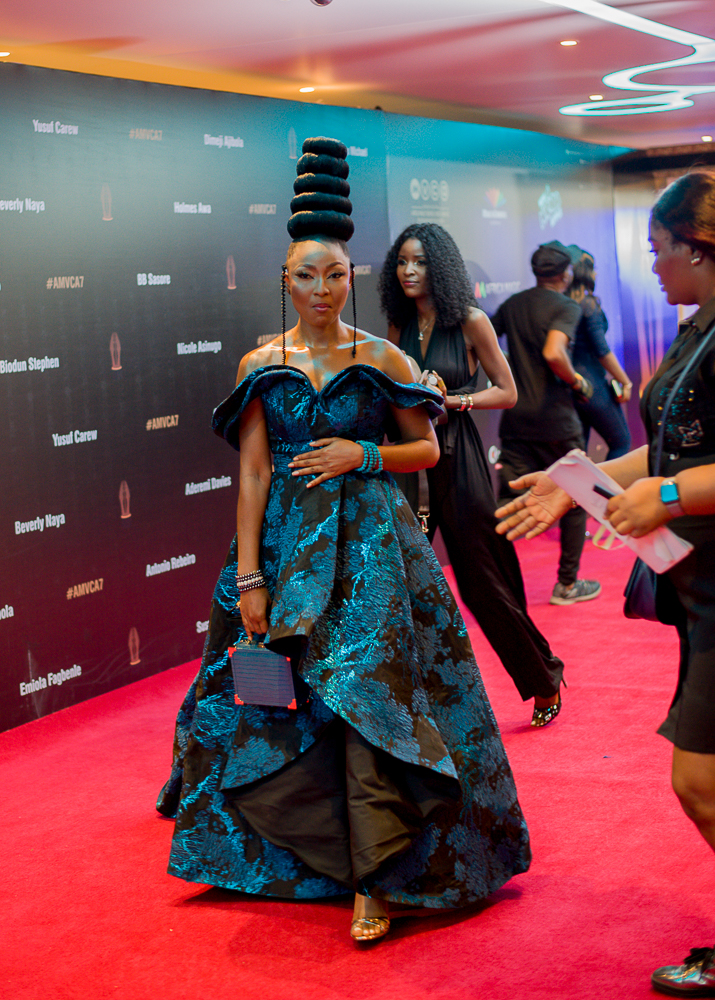
- Belinda Effah at the 2020 AMVCA
- Born: Uyu Effah; 14 December 1984 (age 41); Cross River State, Nigeria
- Education: University of Calabar
- Occupation: Actress
- Years active: 2005–present
- Children: 1
- Father: Asido Bassey Effah
- Awards: the Most Promising Act of the Year at the 9th Africa Movie Academy Awards.
- Website: www.belindaeffahofficial.com

Grace-Charis Bassey Effah (born 14 December 1984) is a Nigerian actress and presenter. She has won six awards throughout her career, including the Most Promising Act of the Year award at the 9th Africa Movie Academy Awards. She changed her name after an encounter with God to Grace-Charis Bassey.

== Early life and education ==
Grace-Charis Bassey was born Uyu Effah on 14 December 1984 in Cross River State, a coastal state in Southern Nigeria. Her father, Lieutenant Commander Asido Bassey Effah, was a commander in the Nigerian Navy.

She had her primary and secondary education at Hillside International Nursery & Primary School and Nigerian Navy Secondary School, Port Harcourt respectively. She furthered her studies at the University of Calabar, majoring in Genetics and Bio-Technology. While in secondary school, she adopted the first name Belinda after her brother suggested that she and her siblings change their names. According to an interview with The Punch Newspaper, she claimed that the disciplinary nature of her dad towards his 14 children was very helpful in shaping her career.

== Career ==
She made her Nollywood television debut in the 2005 TV series Shallow Waters. Afterwards, she took a break from the series to feature in the reality show Next Movie Star. She finished 5th, and was never evicted from the house.

She was once a television presenter for Sound City, a Nigerian Entertainment cable station. However, she left the station to start her own TV show titled Lunch Break with Belinda.

She is the CEO and founder of GCB Empire, a Nigeria-based clothing and fashion brand.

In 2022, Iké Udé's portrait of her was featured in the Nollywood Portraits exhibition at the Smithsonian National Museum of African Art.

In 2025, Grace joined the United States of America Navy, a career she has longed and dreamed for.

== Television ==
Year	Television	Role
2005	Shallow Waters	
	The Room	
2011	Tales of Eve	Simi

== Filmography ==
Year	Film	Role
	Java's House	
2012	Kokomma	Kokomma
2012	Mrs. Somebody	
2012	Alan Poza	Bunmi
2012	Lonely Hearts	Aima
2012	Misplaced	
2012	The Hunters	
2012	Cat and Mouse	
2012	Princess Ekanem	
2012	After the Proposal	Oyinye
2014	Udeme Mmi	Ima
2014	Apaye	Young Yepayeye
2014	Bambitious	Bambi
2014	A Certan Night	Anita
2014	Musical Whispers	
2014	Azonto Babes	
2014	Jump and Pass	Idare
2015	Ojuju Calabar	
2015	The Banker	Daisy Aburi
2015	Desperate Housegirls	Imaobong
2015	Keeping Secret	
2015	Luke of Lies	Shola
2015	Folly	April
2015	So In Love	
2015	Being Single	
2015	Heroes and Villains	Kiki
2016	Black Val	
2016	Lost Pride	Jenny
2016	Oracles Online	Eme
2016	Melting Point	
2016	A Star in Heaven	Mary
2017	Cash Daddy	Doctor
2017	Talking Dolls	Linda
2017	Timid Timi	Anitau
2018	SA Girl	Effe
2018	A Break from Reality	Tomi
2018	The Lost Café	Efe
2018	The Quest	Laide
2019	Crack	
2019	Bursted	
2019	Inside Nollywood: Chapter 1	Self
2019	Hire a Woman	Zainab
2019	The Devil Within	
2019	Miracle	Miracle, Producer
2020	Angel and Gabriela	Gabriela
2020	Secret Twins 1	
2020	Secret Twins 2	
2021	Fine Wine	Angela
2021	Sanitation Day	Ekaette
2021	Enemy Closer	Muna
2022	Hard Choice	Cynthia
2022	Foreigner's God	Oge
2023	Twin Flame	Blessing
2023	Lahira	Alicia Kubanji

== Accolades ==
Year	Award	Category	Film	Result
2012	Best of Nollywood Awards	Most Promising Act (female)	Kokomma	Won
2012	Golden Icons Academy Awards	Best New Actress	Kokomma	Won
2013	Nollywood Movies Awards	Best Rising Star	Kokomma	Won
2013	Nollywood Movies Awards	Best Indigenous Actress	Kokomma	Nominated
2013	Africa Movie Academy Awards	Most Promising Act	Udeme Mmi	Won
2013	Ntanta Award		Udeme Mmi	Won
2014	ELOY Awards	Movie Actress of the Year	After The Proposal	Nominated
2014	2014 Golden Icons Academy Movie Award	Best Supporting Actress	APAYE	Won
2016	Africa Magic Viewers' Choice Awards	Best Actress in a Drama	Stop	Nominated

== Personal life ==
In 2016, she gave birth to a son in the United States. She has kept the identity of the child's father private.

In 2021, she publicly announced that she would like to be addressed as Grace-Charis Bassey rather than as Belinda Effah. She explained that, on 15 August 2020, she had a divine encounter with God that prompted her to change her name to Grace. Charis is a word of Greek origin that also means "grace."

== See also ==
- List of Nigerian actors
