= Lillian Echelon Mbadiwe =

Nollywood actress

- Citizenship: Nigeria
- Occupations: Film actress, model, Producer, Business Woman

Lillian Echelon Mbadiwe is a Nollywood actress, producer, model, and businesswoman who became popular in the Nollywood industry due to her movie Black Rose.

== Filmography ==
- Break The Silence (2016)
- Breaking Chain
- Black Rose (2018) as Rose
- Lily’s New Friend (2020) as Nicole
- Living Nightmares (2013) as Joyce
- Seminarian In Love
- Laurie (2020) as Laurie
- Love Unusual (2021)
- The Debt (2021) as Peace
- Flipside (2023) as Helen
- Yahoo+ (2022) as Kamso

== Nominations and award ==
- Nomination for the Best Female Actor at AMVCA 2018.
- Golden Discovery Actor at Gold Movie Award
- Golden Actress for Drama at Gold Movie Award Africa.

== See also ==
- Ivie Okujaye
- Elma Mbadiwe
- Black rose (2018 film)
