= Katherine Obiang =

Cameroonian-Nigerian actress

- Occupations: Actress; On-air personality TV presenter
- Television: Am Express
- Children: 3

Katherine Obiang is a Cameroonian-Nigerian actress, on-air personality and TV presenter. Initially, she worked as a television presenter for Nigerian Television Authority (NTA) on AM Express and also with Nigeria Info 99.3FM. She subsequently started acting and starred in Nollywood movies and TV series. She featured in the 2017 movie, The Women and won the 2017 Best of Nollywood Awards for the Best Supporting Actress alongside Kate Henshaw and Omoni Oboli.

She has featured alongside other actors in movies such as Lekki Wives, We Don't Live Here Anymore, and Journey to Self amongst others.

== Career ==
Obiang is an actress, entertainer, on-air personality, and TV presenter. She worked as a TV presenter for the Nigerian Television Authority (NTA) on AM Express (morning show) and Nigerian Info 99.3FM. She became more prominent when she featured in the 2012 movie, Journey to Self, directed by Tope Oshin. Afterwards, she has appeared in several Nollywood movies and TV series.

== Personal life ==
Obiang was married to Who Wants to be a Millionaire (Nigerian game show) host Frank Edoho for seven years and they had three children. They separated in 2011 and the marriage ended in 2013.

== Filmography ==
- Lekki Wives (2013-2015 TV Series) as Uju
- Journey to Self (2012) as Rume
- Love and War (2013) as Gina
- The Governor (2016 TV Series) as Joyce
- The Women (2017) as Rose Oyedeji
- We Don't Live Here Anymore (2018) as Nkem Egwuonwu
- Wetin Women Want (2018) as Vero
- Heaven's Hell (2019) as Tara Aliu

== Accolades ==
Awards and Nominations
Year	Awards	Category	Result	Ref.
2013	2013 Best of Nollywood Awards	Best Actress in a Supporting Role in an English Movie	Nominated	
2014	Nigerian Broadcasters Merit Awards	Actress of the year (Viewers Choice)- In memory of late Ambassador Segun Olushola	Nominated	
2014	Nigerian Broadcasters Merit Awards	Outstanding Radio Program Presenter(Midday/lunch hour 11.00am-04.00pm)	Nominated	
2017	2017 Best of Nollywood Awards	Best Actress in a Supporting Role (English)- The Women	Won	
