= Uyoyou Adia =

Nollywood actress and a film director

- Uyoyo at the Discovery For Youth 2026
- Citizenship: Nigeria
- Occupations: Film producer; film director; screenwriter; actress
- Years active: 2013
- Known for: Charge and Bail; The Sessions; Hey You

Uyoyou Adia is a Nigerian actress and film director known for her roles in Charge and Bail, The Sessions and Hey You.

== Career ==
Adia began acting in 2013, appearing in the film Child, Not Bride. In 2017, she interned with Tope Oshin and Remi Ibinola. After the internship, she was selected to participate in Homevida, a writing workshop supported by Google, USAID and Pan-Atlantic University. Since then, she has written, directed and featured in several films.

== Awards and nominations ==
She was nominated for the African Films and Arts Festival Award for Best Emerging Filmmaker.

== Filmography ==
- Child Not Bride
- Nneka: The Pretty Serpent (2020)
- Rattlesnake: The Ahanna Story (2020)
- The Ghost and the Tout (2018)
- Charge and Bail (2021)
- Superstar (2021)
- The Sessions (2020)
- Hey You (2022)
- L.I.F.E (2024)
