= O-Town (disambiguation) =

O-Town is an American boy band formed in 2000.

O-Town may also refer to:

- O-Town (album), a 2001 release by the same band
- O-Town (film), a 2015 Nigerian crime gangster film
- O-Town, a fictional town in the animated series Rocko's Modern Life
- Orlando, Florida, whose nickname is O-Town.
