= Elma Mbadiwe =

Nigerian actress

Elma Nbadiwe
- Born: Abizz Kenechukwu Mbadiwe; Imo State, Nigeria 1988
- Education: Bachelor's degree in mass communication, Redeemer's University Nigeria; Diploma in acting for screen, Royal Arts Academy
- Alma mater: Redeemer's University; Royal Arts Academy
- Occupation: Actress
- Years active: 2016–present

Elma Kenechukwu Mbadiwe // is a Nigerian actress.

== Early life ==
Elma was born on January 28, 1988 in Imo State Nigeria. She had a natural passion for the Arts.

== Education ==
Mbadiwe obtained a bachelor's degree in mass communication from The Redeemer's University Nigeria, Ede, Osun State. She also has a diploma in acting for screen from Royal Arts Academy, Surulere, Lagos.

== Career ==
Before Mbadiwe delved into acting, she worked as a writer at Consolidated Media, the media house for SoundCity. She also worked in the production department.

Her acting career started in 2016, and her first movie was The Audition. She played the lead role, Talullah, in Unbroken, which brought her to the limelight because of the attention she got from fans. She also featured as Laraba in E.V.E. Both movies were produced by African Magic Production. She has starred alongside other Nollywood actors in movies including Rattlesnake: The Ahanna Story and Dysfunction.

== Filmography ==
Filmography
Year	Title	Genre	Role	Selected cast	Ref.
2024	10th Avenue	TV Series - Drama	Efe Johnson	Chimezie Imo Korede Soyinka Caleb Richards	
2023	Over the Bridge	Drama	Joke	Paul Adams Ozzy Agu Akin Lewis Ropo Ewenla	
2022	Far From Home	TV Series - Drama	Carmen Wilmer-Willoughby	Mike Afolarin Olumide Oworu Bucci Franklin Bolanle Ninalowo Ruby Okezie Genoveva Umeh Richard Mofe-Damijo	
2020	Finding Hubby	Comedy; Drama; Romance	Tara Cole	Kehinde Bankole; Omowumi Dada	
2020	Rattlesnake: The Ahanna Story	Drama	Adaugo	Stan Nze; Osas Ighodaro; Chiwetalu Agu; Norbert Young	
2019	Bridges	Short; Drama	Sister	Uche Mac-Auley; Bukky Windo	
2019	Caught Up	Short; Thriller	Nike	Eso Dike Okorocha; Afolabi Olalekan	
2019	Rekindle	Romance		Toosweet Annan; Ariyike Owolagba; Joshua Richard	
2018	E.V.E.-Audi Alteram Partem	TV series - drama	Laraba	Osang Abang; Nemi Kala Aji doki Lord Frank	
2017	In-Line	Drama	David's secretary	Uzor Arukwe; Adesua Etomi-Wellington; Shawn Faqua; Tina Mba	
2017	Alter Ego	Drama	Line producer	Emem Inwang; Omotola Jalade-Ekeinde; Jide Kosoko; Tina Mba	
2016	Without You	Short; Drama			

== Accolades ==
Mbadiwe was nominated for Best Upcoming Actress at the 2018 edition of the Best of Nollywood Awards. The nomination was for her role in the LGBT movie We Don't Live Here Anymore, which received 11 nominations.

== See also ==
- List of Nigerian actors
- Rattlesnake: The Ahanna Story
