= Kenechukwu =

Given name

- Gender: Unisex
- Language: Igbo

Origin
- Origin: Igbo
- Meaning: Thank God
- Region of origin: Igboland

Other names
- Variant forms: Kelechi, Kelechukwu, Keneolisa

Kenechukwu audio is a unisex Nigerian name from the Igbo people. The name means "thank God".

== Notable people with the name ==
- Ken Nnamani (Kenechukwu Nnamani), Nigerian politician
- Elma Mbadiwe (Elma Kenechukwu Mbadiwe), Nigerian actress
- Genoveva Umeh (Genoveva Kenechukwu Umeh), Nigerian actress
