= 2019 Best of Nollywood Awards =

Award ceremony

- Date: 14 December 2019
- Location: Coronation Hall of the Kano State Government, Kano State
- Country: Nigeria
- Hosted by: Maryam Booth and Gbenga Adeyinka

The 2019 Best of Nollywood Awards was the 11th edition of the ceremony and took place in the Coronation Hall of the Kano State Government in Kano State on 14 December 2019. Dr. Abdullahi Umar Ganduje was the chief host of the event and the event was co-hosted by actress, Maryam Booth and Gbenga Adeyinka.

About 100 films were considered. The nomination list was revealed by the jury on 29 September 2019 where Gold Statue by Tade Ogidan earned the highest nominations with 12 nominations followed by Diamonds In The Sky by Femi Adebayo with 11 nominations.

Veteran actor, Sadiq Daba was awarded the Lifetime Achievement Award which was presented by the Kano State governor, Ganduje. Governor Ganduje also endowed Sadiq Daba with a ₦1 million donation on behalf of the Kano the State Government.

Gold Statue won in 6 categories including movie of the year, best actor of the year, director of the year, movie with the best production design, film with the best use of sound and best use of make-up in a Movie. Diamonds In The Sky won in 2 categories namely; movie with the best editing and movie with the best cinematography.

Other winners include Tamara Etaimo, Ibrahim Yekini, Adebimpe Oyebade, Abba Elmustapha, Hadiza Gabon, Hassana Muhammad and Hauwa Kulu.

It was noted that Igbo language films were not represented in the awards and the head of Jury of BON awards, Niran Adedokun reacted saying "The process started in July and with over 100 movies entered for nomination consideration. BON is interested in the promotion of films in Nigerian languages as filmmaking is a tool for preservation. But we struggle to get entries in other languages other than Yoruba so I encourage producers to employ more of our languages and sunlit them for awards."

== Awards ==
Best Actor in a Lead role – English	Best Actor in a Lead role –Yoruba
Gabriel Afolayan – Gold Statue; Ramsey Nouah – Levi; Kelechi Udegbe – The Coffin Salesman; Blossom Chukwujekwu – Black Rose; IK Ogbonna – Jofran; O. C. Ukeje – Unbreakable	Ibrahim Yekini – The Return of Kesari; Rotimi Salami – Adebimpe Omooba; Lateef Adedimeji – 0707; Abiodun Anibaba – Majele; Joseph Momodu – Agbokolori
Best Actress in a Lead role –English	Best Actress in a Lead role –Yoruba
Tamara Etaimo – Thick Skinned; Omowunmi Dada – Diamond in the Sky; Cynthia Shalom – Chain; Martha Ehinome Orhiere– Dear Bayo; Nancy Isime – Jofran; Arese Emokpae – Unbreakable	Adebimpe Oyebade – 0707; Bukunmi Oluwasina – Akalamagbo; Omowumi Dada – Majele; Dayo Amusa – Last Night; Jumoke Odetola – Agbokolori
Best Supporting Actor –English	Best Supporting Actress – English
Deyemi Okanlawon – Levi; Kelechi Udegbe – Dear Bayo; Kunle Remi – Gold Statue; Stan Nze – Thick Skinned; Preach Bassey – A Day Outside; Gregory Ojefua - Fateful Day	Ebele Okaro – Black Rose; Toyin Abraham – Diamond in the Sky; Yvonne Enakhena – Scarred; Tunbosun Aiyedehin – Dear Bayo; Tana Adelana – Alter Date
Best Actor in a Lead role –Hausa	Best Actress in a Lead role –Hausa
Abba Elmustapha – Hauwa Kulu	Hadiza Gabon and Hassana Muhammad – Hauwa Kulu
Best Actor in a Supporting role –Hausa	Best Actress in a Supporting role –Hausa
Jamiu Sani Awayman – Kar ki manta da ni	Hassana Muhammad – Nawwarra
Most Promising Actor	Most Promising Actress
Daniel Osarumwense – Dear Bayo; Oruaro Adia – #THEFOURTHSIDE	Ates Brown – #THEFOURTHSIDE; Martha Ehinome Orhiere – Dear Bayo; Valerie Dish – Dear Bayo; Cynthia Shalom – Chain
Best Supporting Actor –Yoruba	Best Supporting Actress –Yoruba
Lateef Adedimeji – Adebimpe Omooba; Dayo Adegbite – Majele; Odunlade Adekola – Last Night; Olaide Almoruf – Ere Gele; Femi Adebayo – The Return of Kesari	Regina Chukwu – 0707; Toke Jamiu – Do or Die; Oyebade Adebimpe – Majele; Jaiye Kuti – Ipade; Mercy Aigbe – Return of Kesari; Yewande Awokoya - Alubarika
Best Child Actor	Best Child Actress
Emeka Nweke – Thick Skinned; Ofoegbu Francis – A Day Outside; Olabambo Balogun – The Family	Mariam Kayode – Coffin Salesman; Chiamaka Onyekpa – Scarred
Movie with the Best Sound	Best Movie with Social message
Gold Statue; Thick Skinned; Return of Kesari; Unbreakable; Diamond in the Sky	Unbreakable; #THEFOURTHSIDE; Thorn; Thick Skinned; My Silence; Diamond in the Sky
Movie with the Best Special Effect	Movie with the Best Screenplay
Broken Blood; A Day Outside; Eyes of the Future	Majele; Black Rose; Levi; Gold Statue; Diamond in the Sky
Best Short Film	Best Documentary
#THEFOURTHSIDE; Just One Night; Thorn; Greener Pasture; A Different Cell	’76: The Story Behind the story; Ogbu- oja Eze
Best Use of Nigerian Food in a Movie	Movie with the Best Editing
Black Rose; Majele; 0707; Ere Gele	Diamond in the Sky; Gold Statue; Unbreakable; Dear Bayo; Coffin Salesman
Movie with the Best Cinematography	Best Use of Nigerian Costume in a Movie
Diamond in the Sky; Levi; Gold Statue; Dear Bayo	Majele; Eyes of the Future; Coffin Salesman; Gold Statue; Broken Blood; Alubarika
Best Use of Make up in a Movie	Movie of the Year
Gold Statue; Dear Bayo; Thick Skinned; Black Rose; Coffin Salesman	Gold Statue; Majele; Diamond in the Sky; Unbreakable; Levi
Director of the Year	Best Kiss in a Movie
Gold Statue – Tade Ogidan; Diamond in the Sky – Kunle Afolayan; Majele – Bogungbe Paul; Levi – Okey Oku; Unbreakable - Ben Chiadika	Nancy Osime/IK Ogbonna – Jofran; Omowunmi Dada/Femi Adebayo – Diamond in the Sky; Kenneth Okolie/Lilian Esoro – Alter Date; Jumoke Odetola/Joseph Momodu – Agbokolori
Revelation of the Year –male	Revelation of the Year –female
Joseph Momodu; Roxy Antak; Felix Omokhodion; Joshua Richard	Efe Irele; Kenny Kujore; Aramide Otun; Jemima Osunde; Sharon Ooja; Lilian Mbadiwe
Movie with the Best Production Design	Movie with the Best Soundtrack
Gold Statue; Coffin Salesman; Majele; Diamond in the Sky; Black Rose	Return of Kesari; My Silence; Levi; Dear Bayo

== See also ==
- List of African film awards
