= Savvy Initiative Recognition Awards =

Award ceremony in the US

Savvy Initiative Recognition Awards (SIRA) is an annual award program organized by the Savvy Initiative. This award's aim is to recognize Africans living in and outside of the continent and contributing in different fields such as philanthropy, entrepreneurship and leadership.

== History ==
The award was established by Savvy Initiative, a non-profit organization founded in 2014. The award categories are named after famous landmarks and symbols in Africa, including the Nile (Philanthropic Endeavors), Baobab (Honorary Award), Giza (Outstanding Achievement), Serengeti (Entertainment), Kilimanjaro (Lifetime Achievement), and Iroko (History Maker). The pioneer award was held in Las Vegas, Nevada in the United States.

== Recipients ==
PM News, Nigerian Tribune has praised SIRA because of the impact it has done for Africans and African dispora.

=== 2024 ===
It was hosted by Frank Edoho. The winners were: Almaz Negash, CEO and founder, African Diaspora Network; Irene Xanderena, an healthcare advocate; Joyce Agbanobi, a data analytics expert; Bola Adeniyi, a cybersecurity expert; J Hackett a social scientist and entrepreneur; Femi Ojo, agile coach and project management expert and Coach J, who was awarded for his influence in technology and humanitarianism.

=== 2025 ===
The winners were: Kenn Collier Sr., Hugh Molotsi, Lara Ezeobi and Ayowale Alao, Emil Ekiyor, Mikka Mosby, Manny Ohonme.
