= Lucy Ameh =

Nollywood actress

- Born: 12 June 1980 (age 46)
- Citizenship: Nigerian
- Education: Ahmadu Bello University
- Occupations: Film actress, business woman

Lucy Ameh // (born 12 June 1980) is a Nollywood actress and business woman who became popular after starring in Braids on a Bald Head in 2010.

== Early life and education ==
Lucy was born in Kaduna on 12 June 1980. She started acting at her church in her youth. She finished from NTA TV college and had her B.Sc. in Mass Communication from Ahmadu Bello University, Zaria after which she obtained a diploma in Law at the University of Jos.

== Career ==
Lucy started acting right from a young age, acting in several church plays and became recognized as an actress after acting in the movie 'Queen of Zazzau'.

== Filmography ==
- The Silent Intruder (2024) as Keta
- Honey We Are Broke (2023) as Helen
- In Her Shoes (2023) as Lola
- Innocent Guilt (2023)
- Hunt for Perfection (2022) as Gift
- Kofa (2022) as Lilian
- Temptation (2022) as Banke
- Just friends
- Women and Lie (2021)
- Satisfy Me (2021)
- Amina (2021) as Amina
- Disjointed (2020) as Lucy
- Swapped (2020) as Ajoke
- The Anomalous (2020) as Freda
- The Culprit (2019) as Detective
- Power of 1 (2018) as Kate
- Bariga Sugar (2017) as Hanatu
- Surprise Wedding (2017) as Ada
- Different Passion (2016) as Abbey
- O-Town (2015) as Jenny
- Dise's Secret (2015 TV Movie) as Sope
- Learning Curves (2013)
- Braids on a bald head (2010) as Samira

== Award ==
Best actress award at the Kannywood entertainment in 2014 for the Queen of Zazzau.

== See also ==
- Hadiza Aliyu
- Amina (2021 film)
- Maureen Ihua
