= Dear Bayo =

2020 Nigerian romance film

- Directed by: Imoh Umoren
- Story by: Imoh Umoren
- Starring: Chimezie Imo; Tunbosun Aiyedehin
- Release date: 31 January 2020
- Running time: 102 minutes
- Country: Nigeria
- Language: English

Dear Bayo is a 2020 Nigerian romantic drama film written and directed by Imoh Umoren. The film stars Chimezie Imo and Tunbosun Aiyedehin in the lead roles while the film marked the fifth directorial venture of Imoh Umoren. The film was mostly shot in Niger Delta. The film was released on 31 January 2020 and opened to positive reviews.

== Synopsis ==
The storyline follows a love affair between a youth corper Bayo who plays the titular role and Ebipade, a humble girl. Both are from humble backgrounds and are smitten by each other but have to overcome obstacles in their personal lives to be together forever.

== Cast ==
- Chimezie Imo as Bayo
- Juliet Awinoren as Jemima
- Tunbosun Aiyedehin as Iya Bayo
- Martha Ehinome as Ebipade
- Valery Dish as Rahina
- Donald Ndubuisi as Sekibo
- Gregory Ojefua as Mugabe
- Kelechi Udegbe as Epalibo
- J.J. Ekpiteta as Capenter
- Lucy Glover as Efe
- Chioma Obi as Ruka
- Ofindelia Etineh as Sekibo's Girlfriend
- Isaiah Ode as Rukky
- Daniel Osarumwense as Aliyu

== Awards and nominations ==
Year	Award	Category	Result	Ref
2019	Best of Nollywood Awards	Best Actor in a Lead role – English	Nominated	
2019	Best of Nollywood Awards	Best Supporting Actor – English	Nominated	
2019	Best of Nollywood Awards	Best Supporting Actress – English	Nominated	
2019	Best of Nollywood Awards	Movie with the Best Soundtrack	Nominated	
2019	Best of Nollywood Awards	Best Use of Make up in a Movie	Nominated	
2019	Best of Nollywood Awards	Movie with the Best Cinematography	Nominated	
2019	Best of Nollywood Awards	Movie with the Best Editing	Nominated	
2019	Best of Nollywood Awards	Most Promising Actress	Nominated	
2019	Best of Nollywood Awards	Most Promising Actor	Won	
