= Hey You (film) =

- Directed by: Uyoyou Adia
- Written by: Uyoyou Adia
- Produced by: Victoria Akujobi
- Starring: Temitope Olowoniyan, Rotimi Salami, Miriam Peters, Seyi Awolowo, Tunbosun Aiyedehin, Rita Anwarah, Ebisan and Olayiwola Faruq
- Production company: Anthill Production Studio
- Release date: 29 July 2022 (Nigeria)
- Country: Nigeria
- Language: English

Hey You is a 2022 Nigerian romantic comedy film written and directed by Uyoyou Adia, Abosi Ogba and produced by Victoria Akujobi under the Anthill Production Studio. The film stars Temitope Olowoniyan, Rotimi Salami, Miriam Peters and Seyi Awolowo.

== Synopsis ==
The life of a young software engineer crumbles when he discovers that his crush is an adult film model.

== Cast ==
- Timini Egbuson as Abel
- Efe Irele as Bianca
- Rotimi Salami as Lanre
- Stan Nze as Chiboy
- Tope Olowoniyan as Mrs. Yemi
- Miriam Peters as Zainab
- Lawal Femi as Emmanuel
- Tunbosun Aiyedehin as Mama
- John Promise Adurable as Waiter
- Rita Anwarah as Podcaster
- Ebisan Arayi as Mr. Ajayi
- Olayiwola Faruq as Nikkai Imam
- Seyi Awolowo as Habeeb

== Premiere ==
The film was released in cinemas across Nigeria on 29 July 2022.

== See also ==
IMDb
