= Oga Bolaji =

2018 Nigerian drama film

- Film poster
- Directed by: Kayode Kasum
- Written by: Kayode Kasum; Omo Ojeiwa
- Produced by: Mayowa Bakare
- Starring: Ikponmwosa Gold; Omowumi Dada; Idowu Philips
- Production company: Kaykas Studios
- Release date: 7 August 2018
- Running time: 90 minutes
- Country: Nigeria
- Languages: Afrikaans; English; Yoruba

Oga Bolaji is a 2018 Nigerian drama film written and directed by Kayode Kasum. The film stars Ikponmwosa Gold, Omowumi Dada and Idowu Philips in the lead roles. The film was released on 7 August 2018 and received positive reviews from critics and was critically acclaimed for its screenplay and story. The film was also screened at several film festivals such as New York African Film Festival, Nollywood week Paris, Zimbabwe International Film Festival, RTF Film Festival, Cardiff Film Festival and Zanzibar International Festival. The film was premiered for free by the director himself via YouTube in April 2020 for the people who were staying at home during lockdown due to the coronavirus pandemic in the country.

== Synopsis ==
Oga Bolaji is the story of the happy-go-lucky life of a retired, 40-year-old musician whose life changes drastically forever when he crosses paths with a 7-year-old girl.

== Cast ==
- Ikponmwosa Gold as Oga Bolaji
- Idowu Philips as Mama Bolaji
- Omowumi Dada as Victoria
- Gregory Ojefua as Omo
- Jasmine Fakunle as Ajua
- Ronke Ojo
- Officer Woos

== Awards and nominations ==
Year	Award ceremony	Prize	Result	Ref
2018	Best of Nollywood Awards	Best Actor in a Lead Role - English - Gold Ikponmwosa	Nominated	
2018	Best of Nollywood Awards	Best Actress in a Lead Role - English - Omowumi Dada	Nominated	
2018	Best of Nollywood Awards	Best Supporting Actor –English - Greg Ojefua	Nominated	
2018	Best of Nollywood Awards	Best Child Actress - Jasmine Fakunle	Won	
2018	Best of Nollywood Awards	Movie with the Best Screenplay	Nominated	
2018	Best of Nollywood Awards	Movie with the Best Editing	Nominated	
2018	Best of Nollywood Awards	Movie with the Best Cinematography	Nominated	
2018	Best of Nollywood Awards	Director of the Year - Kayode Kasum	Nominated	
2018	Best of Nollywood Awards	Movie with the Best Production Design	Nominated	
2018	Best of Nollywood Awards	Movie with the Best Soundtrack	Nominated	
