= List of African film awards =

A list of African film awards:

- Africa International Film Festival
- Africa Movie Academy Awards (AMAA)
- Africa Magic Viewers' Choice Awards (AMVCA)
- Best of Nollywood Awards
- Botswana Independence Film Festival
- Cairo International Film Festival
- Cameroon Academy Awards
- Golden Movie Awards
- Ghana Movie Awards
- Golden Icons Academy Movie Awards
- Kalasha Awards
- Kenya Film & TV Awards
- Marrakech International Film Festival
- Namibian Theatre and Film Awards
- Nollywood and African Film Critics Awards
- Nollywood Movies Awards
- Riverwood Academy Awards
- Rwanda International Movie Award (RIMA)
- South African Film and Television Awards
- Tanit d'or
- Zambia Film, Television and Radio Awards (ZAFTAR)
- Zanzibar International Film Festival
- Zulu African Film Academy Awards (ZAFAA Global Awards)
