= The Sessions (2020 film) =

- Directed by: Judith Audu
- Written by: Judith Audu
- Produced by: Omowumi Dada; Uyoyou Adia; Morten Foght; Judith Audu
- Starring: Efa Iwara; Omowumi Dada; Judith Audu; Tunbosun Aiyedehin
- Release date: 2020
- Country: Nigeria
- Language: English

The Sessions is a 2020 Nigerian romantic drama film written and directed by Judith Audu and produced by Audu, Omowumi Dada, Uyoyou Adia and Morten Foght.

The film was shot on the streets of Lagos. It stars Audu, Efa Iwara, Omowunmi Dada, Okey Uzoeshi, Tunbosun Aiyedehin, Fred Amata, Ada Ameh and Tony Akposheri.

== Synopsis ==
The film follows a couple whose marriage begins smoothly until their past haunts them. The various methods used to sustain the marriage create suspense throughout the story.

== Cast ==
- Tunbosun Aiyedehin as Mrs. Oghenekaro
- Tony Akposeri as Uncle Maro
- Fred Amata as Mr. Oghenekaro
- Ada Ameh as Aunty Rose
- Judith Audu as Elohor
- Omowunmi Dada as Onome
- Efa Iwara as Banjo
- Okey Uzoeshi as Ejiro

== Awards and nominations ==
The Sessions was nominated for 11 awards at the 2020 edition of the Best of Nollywood Awards, including Movie of the Year, Best Director for Judith Audu, Best Leading Actor for Efa Iwara, and Best Leading Actress for Omowumi Dada. It was also nominated for Movie with Best Social Message, Best Screenplay, Best Editing, Best Use of Makeup, Best Soundtrack, Best Use of Nigerian Food, and Best Kiss in a Movie.
