= Braids on a Bald Head =

2010 Nigerian short Drama film

- Directed by: Ishaya Bako
- Produced by: Oliver Aleogena
- Cinematography: Clarence Peters
- Edited by: Chuka Ejorh
- Music by: Bello Buhari
- Distributed by: London Film School
- Release date: 2010
- Running time: 25 minutes
- Country: Nigeria
- Languages: English; Hausa

Braids on a Bald Head is a 2010 Nigerian short film directed by Ishaya Bako about the culture of the Hausa people. It won the Best Short Film award at the 8th Africa Movie Academy Awards. Clarence Peters was the cinematographer of the film.

It tells the story of Hauwa, who is a totally submissive Islamic wife, who does whatever her husband tells her to do irrespective of her convenience. Her husband, Musa determines her sexual and financial freedom. On the other hand, Samira is an independent woman, who recently got to lodge within Hauwas' compound. Despite initially being intrigued on the idea that a woman of her age should ideally be in her husband house, Hauwa and Samira began to develop a friendship, until Samira makes it clear with a sudden mouth-to-mouth kiss that she wants a sexual relationship with Hauwa. Even though Hauwa recognized the act as an abomination, this event and her bonding with Samira gave her the courage stand up to the mistreatment she has been enduring from her husband.

== Cast ==
- Mannura Umar as Hauwa
- Lucy Ameh as Samira
- Johnson Yakubu Sani as Musa
- Tina David as Mama Nkechi
- Jennifer Igbinovia as Helen
- Mopelola Akanbi as Jumoke

== Plot ==
Set in a predominantly Islamic village in Northern Nigeria, the film starts with Hauwa (Mannura Umar) performing the daily Salat. While performing her duties as a wife for her husband, she is confronted by her neighbor, Samira (Lucy Ameh), who questioned her dedication and satisfaction as a housewife. After ignoring Samira through her body language, she leaves the scene then tries to inform her husband, Musa (Johnson Yakubu) of her encounter with Samira. But he rubbished her, saying that she always does not mind her business, and she shouldn't be associating with a woman [Samira], that is neither in her husband or parents house.

After getting to her shop in the morning of the same day, Hauwa and her colleagues began discussing on the happenings in town. Hauwa initiates a talk about Samira, then the conversation ended when one of her friends suggested that she may be a lesbian, hence she isn't living with a man. Some hours past, then Hauwa gets a call to hair-dress one of her customers at home. On her way out of the salon, she meets Samira, who wanted her to fix her hair, Hauwa nearly obliged but her fellow stylists wanted her [Samira] to wait for her turn before being attended to; Hauwa comes to her rescue by defending her, Samira turned down the offer to wait and decided to do hers another time. They both stare at each other for a while, then Hauwa leaves for the home service.

On getting home, she informed her husband that she has gathered enough money to assist them to pay their due rent. Musa accepted her payment without showing any form of appreciation towards her as he was more concerned about his faulty bike. Hauwa goes to Samira's lodge and ask her for extra candles, which she says she doesn't have, she then requests that she assist in loosening her hair, which she later accepted after much plead. As she straightens her hair, they began to bond and discuss about their individual lives and the importance of marriage. One thing led to another, then Samira persuasively kissed Hauwa, who neither stopped or reciprocated the romantic gesture. After she retired, Hauwa left Samira's house describing the act as an "abomination", after Samira told her to leave her husband to stay with her. On getting home, Musa began a quarrel with Hauwa, however, she spoke back at him for the first time, that he is not treating her right, this made Musa to slap her severally.

Later during the day, Musa began to feel guilty and for the first time expressed some form of regret about his action towards her.

== See also ==
- List of Nigerian films of 2010
