= Passport (2022 film) =

2022 Nigerian comedy thriller film by Abosi Ogba

- Directed by: Dimeji Ajibola
- Written by: Abosi Ogba
- Story by: Abosi Ogba
- Produced by: Vincent Okonkwo
- Starring: Jide Kosoko; Mercy Johnson; Jim Iyke Zubby Michael Lateef Adedimeji
- Production company: VSL Media
- Distributed by: FilmOne Entertainment
- Release dates: 2 September 2022 (Lagos premiere); 2 September 2022 (Nigeria)
- Running time: 120 minutes
- Country: Nigeria
- Language: English

Passport is a 2022 Nigerian Nollywood comedy film directed by Dimeji Ajibola and written by Abosi Ogba. The movie features Nollywood stars like Mercy Johnson Okojie, Jide Kosoko, Jim Iyke, Zubby Michael and Lateef Adedimeji. The movie was released on 2 September 2022 by VSL Media.

The movie centres on two major characters: Oscar (Jim Iyke), who lost his travelling passport and Kopiko (Mercy Johnson Okojie) who wants to be chairperson of the community but needs to defeat Terminator (Zubby Michael) in the community elections.

== Synopsis ==
The movie is about the story of Oscar and Kopiko, two people who are both in search of excitement in their life but are at opposite ends of the loneliness life. Oscar is on his way to the Airport planning on returning to the UK to meet his sick mother. In the car with his uncle, Oscar loses his bag containing his travelling passport to some street guys (Mighty and Tobee), and needs the assistance of a tomboy (Kopiko) who lives in the ghetto to get his passport back. He has to cooperate with her if he doesn't want to miss a flight to a crucial job interview in United Kingdom.

On the other hand, Kopiko, a Tomboy who grew up in the ghetto, with his sister and sick mother, seeing the lack of development in the community, is prompted to desire to become the chairperson in the community, but has terminator to contend with for the post.

== Movie premiere ==
The movie was produced by the VSL Media and was premiered in cinemas nationwide on the 2nd of September 2022. The movie was opened in 56 cinema locations in Nigeria on its debut day.

== Casts and crew ==
=== Crew members ===
Script write by Abosi Ogba

Directed by Dimeji Ajibola

Produced by Vincent Okonkwo

Production company VSL Media

=== Casts ===
- Daniel Abua as Ahmed
- Lateef Adedimeji as Abubakar
- Stephen Damian as Tispy
- Lina Idoko as Mighty
- Caroline Igben as Queen
- Jim Iyke as Oscar
- Jide Kosoko as Mr. Pounds (Oscar's Uncle)
- Zubby Michael as Terminator
- Nasboi as Kasper
- Emeka Nwagbaraocha as Tobe
- Emem Ufot as Professor
- Mercy Johnson Okojie as Kopiko
- Tunbosun Aiyedehin as Mrs. Adeleke
- Bukola Alex Doji as Sylvia
- Naomi Emmanuel as Nurse
- Adebowale Ezekiel as Officer
- Jimmy Fadel as Doctor
- Alex Lucky as DPO
- Blessing Onwukwe as Mrs. Achike

== Awards and nominations ==
Year	Award	Category	Recipient	Result	Ref
2023	Africa Magic Viewers' Choice Awards	Best Actress In A Comedy/TV Series	Mercy Johnson Okojie	Nominated	
