= Frank Edoho =

Nigerian television presenter

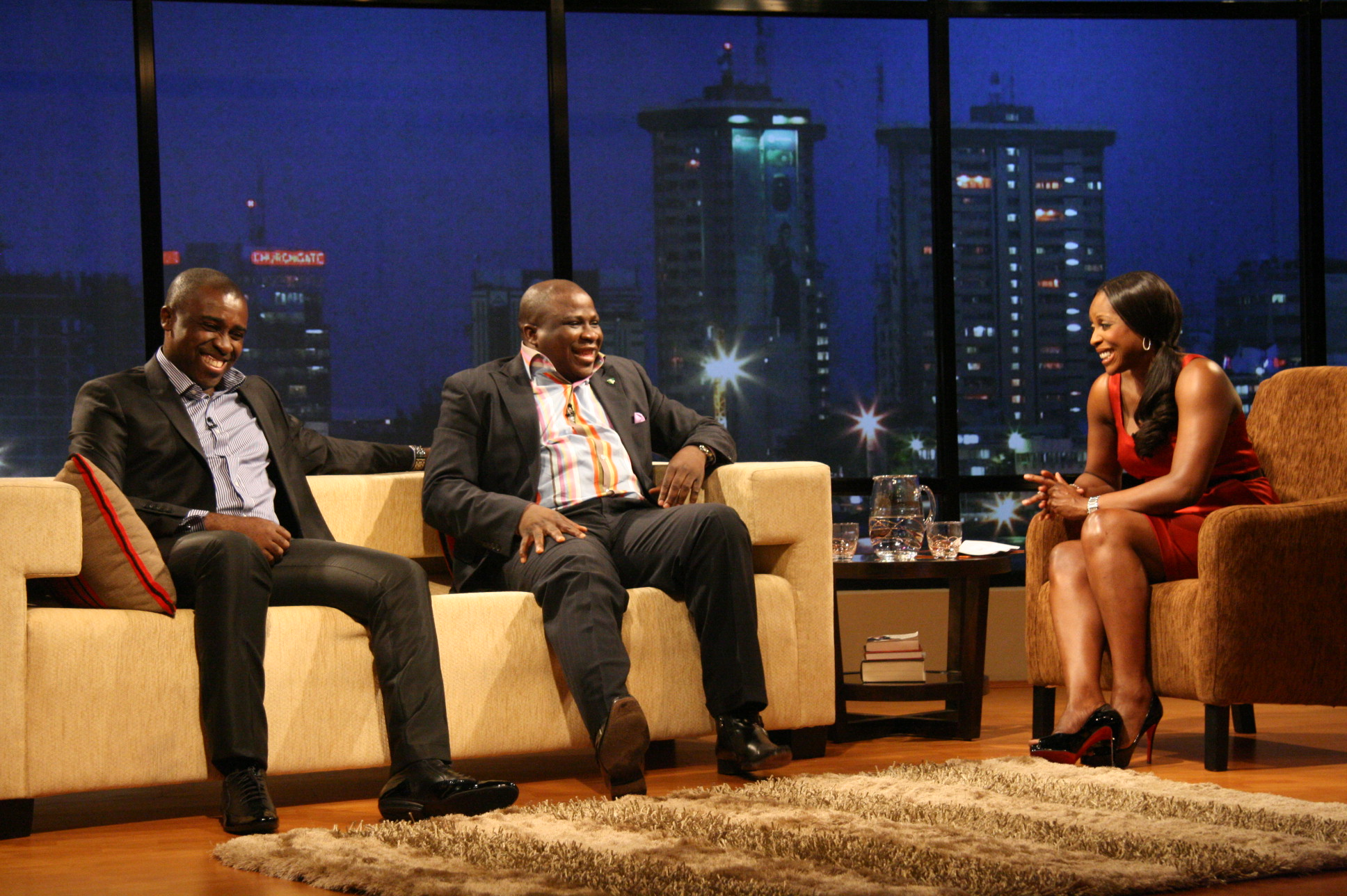
- Born: Frank Edoho; 8 July 1972 (age 54); Kano State, Nigeria
- Education: University of Calabar
- Occupations: TV Show host, filmmaker
- Years active: 1995–present
- Spouse(s): Katherine Obiang (separated), Sandra Onyenaucheya
- Children: 5

Frank Edoho (born 8 July 1972) is a Nigerian television host, filmmaker, and photographer. He is best known as the host of the Nigerian television game show Who Wants to Be a Millionaire.

== Education and career ==
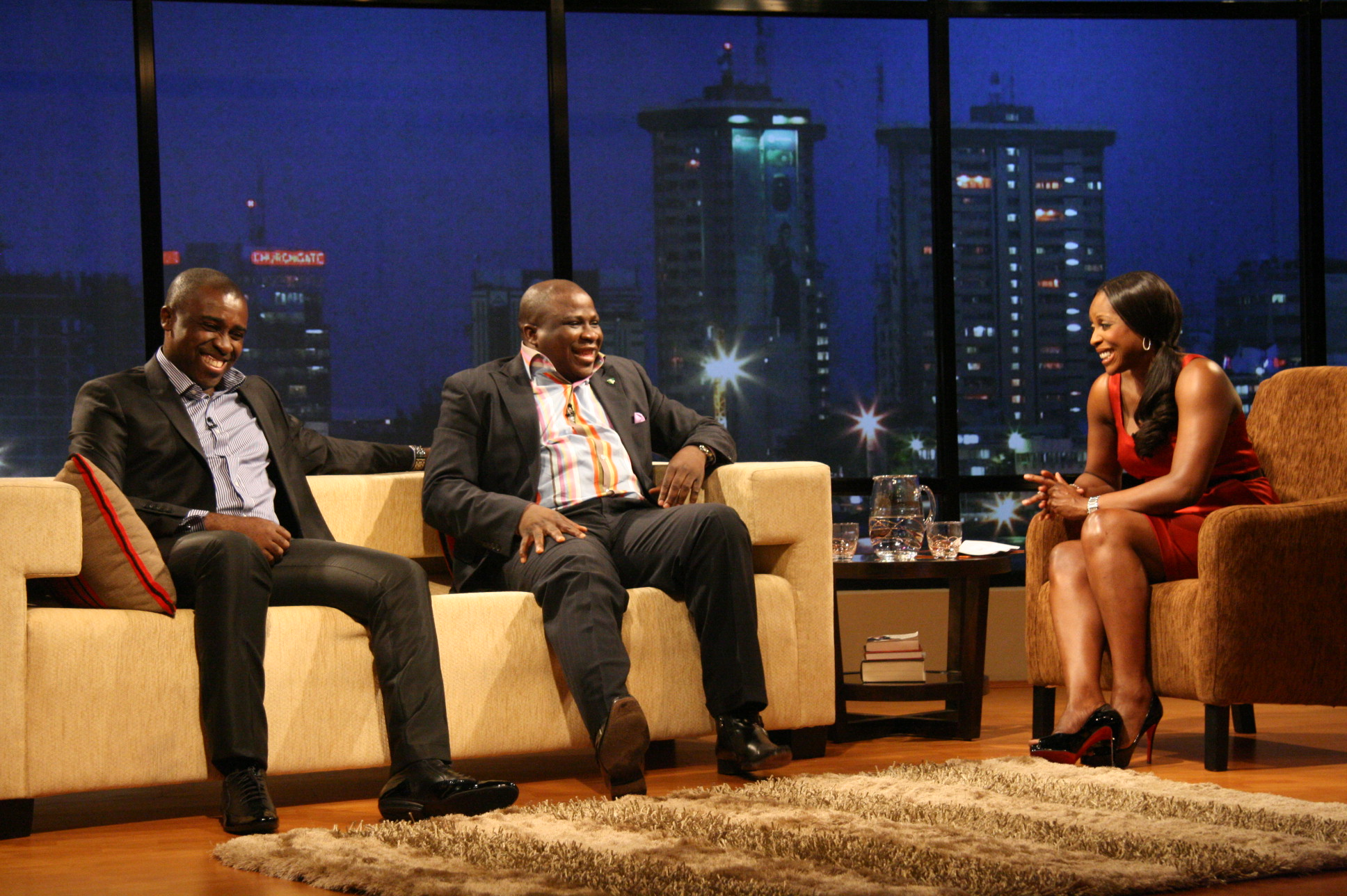
Frank Edoho & Gbenga Adeyinka With Mo on Win Win Win

Edoho studied animal science at University of Calabar. While in school, he was a rapper with the stage name Mc Frank. After graduation, he started his broadcasting career as a presenter at the Cross River State Broadcasting Corporation and also anchored a breakfast television show for the Nigerian Television Authority, Channel 9, Calabar. Edoho moved to Metro FM 97.6 in 1999 where he anchored radio shows for the radio station. He gained recognition as the host of Who Wants to Be a Millionaire. Aside from being a television host, he is also a voice over artist, photographer, producer and a filmmaker. After he rejected a new deal to continue as host of Who Wants to Be a Millionaire, he was unveiled alongside Emmanuel Essien, popularly known as Mannie, as the host of the television game show, The Price Is Right. Edoho has also performed voice-over work for radio advertisements and jingles for Vogue Fruit Juice, First City Monument Bank, Unilever Nigeria Plc, International Bank Plc and Elizade Toyota. He hosted the Savvy Initiative Recognition Awards in 2024.

== Who Wants To Be A Millionaire ==
Edoho hosted the television game show for 13 years from 2004 to 2017 but resigned on 2 September 2017. He announced his departure via his official Twitter page after failing to agree on terms with Ultima Studios. Edoho denied being "dropped" by the organisers of the show, maintaining that he "declined the offer" that was given to him. In February 2022, he returned to the show.

== Personal life ==
Edoho was married to Katherine Obiang, with whom he had three children, before they separated in 2011. He later married his second wife, Sandra Onyenuchenuya, and on 2 April 2014, they had their first child together (Edoho's fourth). Their second child was born two years later in the United States. After their divorce, Obiang accused Edoho of physical abuse, which he denied.

In May 2026, Edoho publicly confirmed that his marriage to Onyenucheya had ended in a separation in mid-2025, and that the couple were undergoing divorce proceedings. Onyenucheya publicly accused Edoho of infidelity, which he denied. Edoho also accused Onyenucheya of having an affair with singer Chike; he published audio recordings online which he said were of calls Onyenucheya had made which proved that the affair had taken place. She denied the accusation, and additionally accused Edoho of physical abuse.

== Award and recognition ==
- Youth Ambassador Award by Fly Networks
- Best TV Presenter of the Year 2006 by City People Magazine Award
- Male TV Presenter of the Year 2008 by Nigeria Kids Choice Award
