= Niran Adedokun =

Nigerian writer (born 1971)

- Born: Sunday Adeniran Adedokun; September 21, 1971 (age 54); Ilorin, Kwara, Nigeria
- Education: University of Ilorin (1992 & 2007); University of Lagos (1999 & 2022)
- Occupations: Journalist, Writer
- Organization: The Well-being Foundation (2007-
- Writing career
- Language: English
- Genres: Biography; Non-fiction; Contemporary fiction
- Years active: 2003–present
- Notable works: Ladies calling the shots novel (2017); The Danfo Driver in all of us (2019)
- Website: niranadedokun.com

Sunday Adeniran Adedokun (born September 21, 1971), professionally known as Niran Adedokun is a Nigerian writer and lawyer.

== Career ==
Adedokun, started his career as a journalist for local newspapers in Nigeria.

Adedokun is the author of many books including the book titled ‘Ladies calling the shots,’ published in 2017, a piece that looked into women’s contribution to the Nigerian film and entertainment business, which named many women including Tope Oshin, a Nigerian television and film director, producer. In 2019, he published a collection of some of his wide-ranging essays under the title ‘The Danfo Driver in All of Us.’ Following that was a publication of his anthology of fictional short stories the book titled ‘The Law is an Ass;’ and his recent book being ‘The Man, the Soldier, the Patriot: Biography of Lt. Gen. Ibrahim Attahiru,’ a biographical Adedokun published in 2022 about a notable Nigeria’s former Chief of Army Staff who died in an airplane crash.

== Bibliography ==
Title	Date	Publisher	Notes
Ladies calling the shots	2017	Narrative Landscape Press	The book recognises the contributions of women in films in Nigeria.
The Danfo Driver in All of Us	2019	Narrative Landscape Press	A collection of some of Adedokun’s wide-ranging essays
The Law is an Ass	2021	Narrative Landscape Press	an anthology of fictional short stories
The Man, the Soldier, the Patriot: Biography of Lt. Gen. Ibrahim Attahiru	2022	Cable Books	A biography of Nigeria’s former Chief of Army Staff who died in an air crash.
