= 2018 Best of Nollywood Awards =

Award ceremony

- Date: 9 December 2018
- Location: Kakanfo conference centre, Ibadan, Oyo State
- Country: Nigeria
- Hosted by: Helen Paul and Keppy Ekpeyong Bassey

The 2018 Best of Nollywood Awards was the 10th edition of the ceremony, and took place in Kakanfo conference centre in Ibadan, Oyo state on 9 December 2018. The Oyo state governor, Abiola Ajimobi served as the chief host. The event was co-hosted by comedian, Helen Paul and actor, Keppy Ekpeyong Bassey.

A total 112 films, including 93 feature films, 9 short films and 1 documentary series were considered. The nomination list was revealed in November 2018 where We Don’t Live Here Anymore by Tope Oshin earned the highest nominations with 11 nominations, followed by Oga Bolaji with 10 nominations, Queen of Queens with 8 nominations and Obsession earning 6 nominations.

We Don’t Live Here Anymore won in four of the categories, including best director, best editing, movie of the year and the most promising actor award which was jointly awarded to Francis Sule and Temidayo Akinboro. Oga Bolaji won 1 of the awards in the 10 categories it was nominated in.

== Awards ==
Best Actor in a Lead role – English	Best Actor in a Lead role –Yoruba
· Kelechi Udegbe – Bedroom Point · Ramsey Nouah – Body Language · Gold Ikponmwosa – Oga Bolaji · Nosa Obaseki – Queen of Queens · Femi Branch – What Men Want · Mike Godson - Mark of Royalty	· Yemi Solade – Irolabi · Femi Adebayo – Etiko Onigedu · Lateef Adedimeji – Hey · Ninalowo Bolanle – Judasi · Ibrahim Chatta - A Year to Live
Best Actor in a Lead role –Hausa	Best Actor in a Lead role –Igbo
· Umar M Shareef - Mariya · Umar M Shareef - Mansoor	· Swanky JKA - A Lonely Lane · Tim Ebuka – Obinwanne · Swanky JKA – Ofuobi
Best Actress in a Lead role –English	Best Actress in a Lead role –Yoruba
· Tana AdelanTana Adelana – Body Language · Mary Lazarus – What Men Want · Funmilola Aofiyebi Raimi – We Don’t Live Here Anymore · Nancy Isime – Disguise · Omowumi Dada - Oga Bolaji · Maltilda Obaseki - Queen of Queens	· Ronke Ojo – Osun Sengede · Bukunmi Oluwasina – Hey · Feyisara Hassan – Tife Bankole · Dayo Amusa – Tabili ba yi · Seyi Edun – Irukana
Best Actress in a Lead role –Hausa	Best Actress in a Lead role –Igbo
· Maryam Yahaya - Mariya · Maryam Yahaya - Mansoor	· Kindness Fidelis - A Lonely Lane · Phil Daniels – Obinwanne · Chioma Idigo – Ofuobi
Best Supporting Actor –English	Best Supporting Actress –English
· Shawn Faqua – Personal Assistant · Adeniyi Johnson – Outcast · Femi Branch – Obsession · Greg Ojefua – Oga Bolaji · William Omo Godwyn - Ebosimi	· Bimbo Ademoye – Personal Assistant · Victoria Egbuchere – Blame · Ifu Ennada – Obsession · Uche Nwaefuna – What Men Want · Chacha Eke Faani – Mark of Royalty · Moyo Lawal – Bedroom Point
Most Promising Actor	Most Promising Actress
•* Temidayo Akinboro/Francis Sule - We don’t Live Here Anymore • Moses Akerele - Mirabel	•* Oreoluwa Adedoyin - Ofefe • Elma Mbadiwe - We don’t Live Here Anymore • Ifu Ennada - Obsession • Victoria Egbuchere - Blame
Best Supporting Actor –Yoruba	Best Supporting Actress –Yoruba
· Jamiu Azeez – Hey · Adeniyi Johnson – Tife Bankole · Olutayo Amokade – Etiko Onigedu · Ibrahim Chatta – Judasi · Taiwo Ibikunle - A Year to Live	· Liz Da Silva – Eniolami · Mercy Aigbe – Judasi · Bukola Adeeyo – Irukana · Adebimpe Oyebade – Dear Sister · Seyi Asekun - Osun Sengede
Best Child Actor	Best Child Actress
· Daniel Adesina - Ofefe · Prince Adams - Ofuobi	•* Jasmine Fakunle - Oga Bolaji • Ifedi Sharon - Sister Jessica • Zino Amata - Manny
Best Comedy of the Year	Best Movie with Social message
•* A Million Baby • 10 Days in Sun City • Irolabi • Bedroom Point	•* Surrogate • We Don’t Live Here Anymore • A Year to Live • Pain Within • Somina
Movie with the Best Special Effect	Movie with the Best Screenplay
•* Ebosimi • Osun Sengede • Etiko Onigedu • Tife Bankole	•* Queen of Queens • We Don’t Live Here Anymore • Oga Bolaji • Ebosimi • Body language
Best Short Film	Best Documentary
•* Mirabel • Blank • Pain • Omotoke	•* Green Passport
Best Use of Nigerian Food in a Movie	Movie with the Best Editing
•* Simbi Alamala • A Year to Live • Outcast • Etiko Onigedu • Obsession	•* We don’t Live Here Anymore • Oga Bolaji • Surrogate • Queen of Queens
Movie with the Best Cinematography	Best Use of Nigerian Costume in a Movie
•* 10 Days in Sun City • Queen of Queens • Oga Bolaji • Osun Sengede • We don’t Live Here Anymore	•* Ebosimi • Personal Assistant • Osun Sengede • Blame
Best Use of Make up in a Movie	Movie of the Year
•* Disguise • Personal Assistant • Etiko Onigedu • Osun Sengede • Ebosimi	•* We don’t Live Here Anymore • Queen of Queens • Surrogate • Ebosimi • Body Language
Director of the Year	Best Kiss in a Movie
•* Tope Oshin - We Don’t Live Here Anymore • Kabat Esosa Egbon - Queen of Queens and Ebomisi • Sobe Charles Umeh/Akin - Tijani Balogun- Surrogate • Moses Inwang - Body Language • Kayode Kasum - Oga Bolaji	•* Mawuli Gavor/ Odera Olivia Orji – Obsession • Bimbo Ademoye/ Shawn Faqua – Personal Assistant • Yemi Blaq/Ifu Ennada – Obsession • Eddy Watson/Victoria Egbuchere - Blame
Revelation of the Year –male	Revelation of the Year –female
•* David Akande • Debo Macaroni • Tomiwa Tegbe • Emeka Nwagbaracha • Mike Afolarin	•* Adebimpe Oyebade • Zainab Bakare • Jumoke Adelaja • Charity Asuquo • Odera Olivia Orji • Lucy Ameh
Movie with the Best Production Design	Movie with the Best Soundtrack
•* Etiko Onigedu • Osun Sengede • Oga Bolaji • We Don’t Live here Anymore • Ebomisi	•* Queen of Queens • Oga Bolaji • We don’t Live Here Anymore • Surrogate
