= The Women (2017 film) =

2017 Nigerian drama thriller film

- Directed by: Blessing Effiom Egbe
- Written by: Blessing Effiom Egbe
- Produced by: Blessing Effiom Egbe
- Starring: Omoni Oboli; Katherine Obiang; Ufuoma McDermott; Kate Henshaw-Nuttal; Greg "Teddy Bear" Ojefua; Lilian Afegbai; Femi Branch
- Cinematography: Abdullah Yusuf
- Edited by: Victoria Akujobi
- Production company: BConcept Network Productions
- Distributed by: BConcept Network Productions
- Release date: 29 September 2017
- Running time: 125 minutes
- Country: Nigeria
- Language: English

The Women is a 2017 Nigerian drama thriller film directed and produced by Blessing Effiom Egbe. The film stars Omoni Oboli, Katherine Obiang, Ufuoma McDermott, and Kate Henshaw-Nuttal with Gregory Ojefua, Lilian Afegbai, Roxy Antak and Femi Branch in supporting roles. The film is about four female middle aged friends. They bare many secrets about each other and respective marriages. One day they congregate in a resort one weekend on the occasion of one of their birthdays and expressed their secretive lives.

The film premiered on 29 September 2017. The film received positive reviews from critics and screened worldwide.

== Cast ==
- Omoni Oboli as Teni Michaels
- Katherine Obiang as Rose Oyedeji
- Ufuoma McDermott as Omoh Oghene
- Kate Henshaw-Nuttal as Ene Enweuzo
- Greg "Teddy Bear" Ojefua as Chubi Enweuzo
- Lilian Afegbai as Esi
- Roxy Antak as John
- Femi Branch as Ayo Oyedeji
- Kalu Ikeagwu as Bels Michaels
- Anthony Monjaro as Maro Oghene
- Rita Dominic
- Peters Ijagbemi as Account Officer
- Unity Nathan as Gift
- Deji Omogbehin as Doctor
- Tobias Pious as Bellman
- Nene Peters Thomas as Manager
- Tomi Adeoye as Attendant
- Glory Ugbodaga as Sales Girl
- Tony Undie as Bellman

== Awards and nominations ==
Year	Award	Category	Recipient(s)	Result	Ref.
2017	Best of Nollywood Awards	Best Actress in a Lead role –English	Ufuoma McDermott	Nominated	
2017	Best of Nollywood Awards	Best Supporting Actress –English	Kate Henshaw/Omoni Oboli/Kathrine Obiang	Won	
2017	Best of Nollywood Awards	Movie with the Best Screenplay	The Women	Won	
2017	Best of Nollywood Awards	Movie with the Best Editing	The Women	Nominated	
2017	Best of Nollywood Awards	Best Use of Nigerian Costume in a Movie	The Women	Nominated	
2017	Best of Nollywood Awards	Director of the Year	Blessing Egbe	Nominated	
2017	Best of Nollywood Awards	Best Kiss in A Movie	Ufuoma McDemott/Kalu Ikeagu	Nominated	
