= Ifu Ennada =

Nigerian film actress

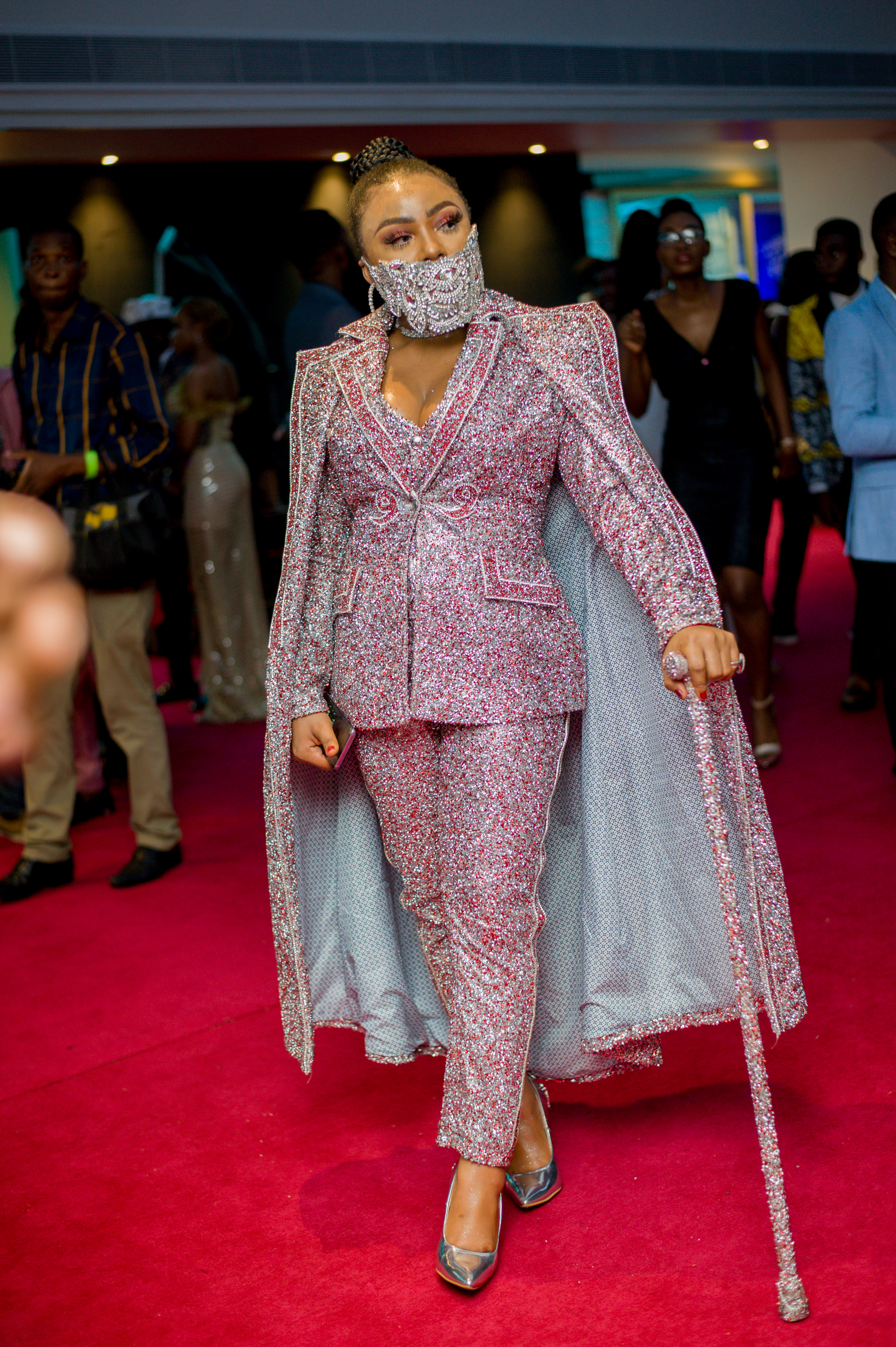
- Born: Iheme Faith Uloma; 23 July 1992 (age 34); Abia State
- Citizenship: Nigerian
- Education: Olabisi Onabanjo University
- Occupation: Film actress
- Years active: 2019- till present
- Known for: Big Brother Naija

Iheme Faith Uloma (born 23 July 1992) better known as Ifu Ennada, is a Nigerian film actress and fashion designer and a former BBNaija housemate. She is also an actress, known for winning the AMAA award for Best Young and Promising Actor in the movie O-Town.

== Early life and career ==
Ennada was born in Abia State, Nigeria, but was raised in Lagos. She studied Computer science at the Olabisi Onabanjo University where she obtained her BSc. She began her movie career in 2019 and in 2016, she was nominated for Best Young/Promising Actor in the movie O-Town at the AMAA awards 2016. In a 2018 interview, she revealed that she had been sexually harassed in 2016.

In 2018, she participated in the Big Brother Naija game show.

== Filmography ==
- O-Town (2015) - Amara
- Tinsel - Prisca
- Obsession (2017) as Aret
- Big Brother Naija 3 (2018) - Contestant
- The Quest (2018) - Demmy
- Lonely Heart
- City of Bastards (2019)
- Hire a Woman (2019) - Jane
- The Lost Okoroshi (2019) - Sarafina
- Mad About You (2019) - Ama

== Awards and nominations ==
Year	Award ceremony	Prize	Result	Ref
2018	Best of Nollywood Awards	Best Supporting Actress – English	Nominated	
2018	Best of Nollywood Awards	Most Promising Actress	Nominated	
2018	Best of Nollywood Awards	Best Kiss in a Movie	Nominated	
