= Tunbosun Aiyedehin =

Nigerian actress and voice-over artiste (born 1969)

- Born: Tunbosun Aiyedehin; 19 June 1973 (age 53); Lagos, Nigeria
- Education: Ahmadu Bello University
- Occupations: Actress, Voice artiste brand partner with Oriflame
- Years active: 2007 - Till Date
- Known for: Two Brides and a Baby (2011); Kpians: The Feast of Soul (2014)
- Awards: 2016 Africa Magic Viewers Choice Awards; Best of Nollywood Awards; 2020 nominee in the Toronto International Film Festival; Best Supporting Actress, Best Supporting Actress- Best Of Nollywood, Best Actress- Short Film-Windsor Int'l Black Film Festival.

Tunbosun Aiyedehin (born June 19, 1973), popularly known as Tuby, is a Nigerian film actress and voice-over artiste. She is best known for her role in the movies, Two Brides and a Baby and Kpians: The Feast of Soul.

== Life ==
Tunbosun Aiyedehin resides in Lagos State. Aiyedehin is a graduate of Business Administration from Ahmadu Bello University.

== Career ==
She joined the Nigerian film industry now known as Nollywood in the early 2000s. Aiyedehin has featured in Nigerian television series films including Hakkunde, Troubled Waters, Moth to a Flame, Hell or High Water, Lockdown, Dear Bayo, Mrs. & Mrs. Johnson and The Ten Virgins. She won Best Supporting Actress in a Drama at the 2016 Africa Magic Viewers' Choice Awards, and Best Actress in a Supporting Role (English) at 2019 Best of Nollywood Awards. She was also a 2020 nominee in the Toronto International Film Festival as best supporting actress. She was also on set for a romantic drama titled Hey You.

== Filmography ==
- Two Brides and a Baby (2011) as Enehi
- Kpians: The Feast of Souls (2014) as Ben's Mom
- A Day with Death (2014) as Margaret
- Mrs. & Mrs. Johnson (2015)
- Before 30 (2015)
- Schemers (2015)
- Moth to a Flame (2016) as Mrs. Segun
- 93 Days (2016)
- Hell or High Water (2016) as Mama Gbolahan
- Oreva (2017)
- Hakkunde (2017) as Mrs. Adejo
- Troubled Waters (2017)
- Hush (2017)
- Our Best Friend's Wedding (2017)
- E.V.E - Audi Alteram Partem (2018)
- The Ten Virgins (2019) as Matriarch
- Black Monday (2019) as Mum
- Clustered Colours (2019)
- Lockdown (2019) as Mrs. Lawal
- Stones (2019)
- Diary of The Damned (2019)
- The Sessions (2020) as Mrs. Oghenekaro
- Dear Bayo (2020) as Iya Bayo
- For Maria Ebun Pataki (2020) as Doctor
- It's a Crazy World (2020) as Adaeze
- Mirabel (2020) as Mrs. Fagbemi
- Yahoo Taboo (2020) as Mama Jide
- Country Hard (2021) as Tola's Mom
- Hey You (2022) as Mama
- Shanty Town (2022)
- Passport (2022) as Mrs Adeleke
- I am Misan (2023)
- Eater of Lies (2023) as Mama
- Tokunbo (2024) as Aunty Yetunde
- Silence (2024) as Dapo's Mother
- After 30 (2025)

== Awards ==
Year	Award	Category	Result	Ref
2016	2016 Africa Magic Viewers Choice Awards	Best Supporting Actress in a Drama	Won	
2019	Best of Nollywood Awards	Best Actress in a Supporting Role (English)	Nominated	
2020	2020 nominee in the Toronto International Film Festival	Best Supporting Actress (Diary of The Damned)	Nominated	
