= City of Bastards =

- Directed by: Yemi Morafa
- Written by: Titilope Orire
- Produced by: Titilope Orire
- Starring: Efu Ennada, Femi Branch Bolanle Ninolowo, Linda Osifo and Stan Nze
- Production company: A Silueta Entertainment Studio
- Release date: 2019
- Country: Nigeria
- Language: English

City Of Bastards is a 2019 Nigerian crime thriller film produced by Titilope Orire and directed by Yemi Morafa under the production company A Silueta Entertainment Studio. The film depicts the daily life of people in the slum. It stars Ifu Ennada, Femi Branch, Bolanle Ninolowo, Linda Osifo and Stan Nze.

== Plot ==
The film focused on different didactic themes that affect the lives of people, especially in the ghetto, such as inter-community violence, drug abuse, prostitution and child trafficking. The lead character, King, is trying to balance his past with the present in order to maintain his position as the king of the slum.

== Cast ==
- Bolanle Ninolowo
- Linda Osifo
- Stan Nze
- Omowunmi Dada
- Ayobami Alvin
- Shaffy Bello
- Femi Branch
- Funky Mallam
- Ifu Ennada
- Judith Audu
- Etinosa Idemudia
