= O-Town (film) =

- First film poster
- Directed by: C.J. Obasi
- Written by: C.J. Obasi
- Produced by: Oge Obasi; C.J. Obasi
- Starring: Paul Utomi; Brutus Richard; Ifeanyi Delvin Ijeoma; Chucks Chyke; Ifu Ennada; Lucy Ameh; Kalu Ikeagwu; Olu Alvin
- Cinematography: Tunji Akinsehinwa
- Edited by: C.J. Obasi
- Music by: Beatoven; Wache Pollen
- Production company: Fiery Film Company
- Release date: November 2015 (African International Film Festival)
- Running time: 129 minutes
- Country: Nigeria
- Language: English

O-Town is a Nigerian crime gangster film written and directed by C.J. Obasi. The film stars Paul Utomi as Peace, a hustler at the center of various issues in the small town of Owerri, also known as O-Town. The film's music was composed by Beatoven and Wache Pollen and filming took place in Owerri.

Obasi has described the film as a "crime-gangster thriller. It's a semi-autobiographical tale because it draws from some of the crime stories I knew and heard growing up in a small town called Owerri in Imo State. It's also my exploration into genre film-making, where I explore basically my love for film."

== Story ==
The film is set in a lightly fictionalised version of Owerri, ruled over by a sadistic gangster, The Chairman. The story is told from the viewpoint of an omnipresent, anonymous filmmaker and it follows the travails of Peace, a small time hustler with an ambition to become the head of the streets.

== Cast ==
- Paul Utomi as Peace
- Brutus Richard as Sheriff
- Ifeanyi Delvin Ijeoma as Paami
- Chucks Chyke as The Artiste
- Ifu Ennada as Amara
- Lucy Ameh as Jenny
- Kalu Ikeagwu as The Chairman
- Olu Alvin as Viper
- C.J. 'Fiery' Obasi as narrator

== Reception ==
=== Release and reception ===
It premiered at the 2015 edition of the Africa International Film Festival held in Lagos. Nigerian critic Oris Aigbokhaevbolo described it as "overindulgent but brilliant".

Goteborg Film Festival's artistic director Jonas Holmberg described O-Town as a "Tarantinesque" drama.

=== Official selection ===
- Africa International Film Festival (AFRIFF), 2015
- Goteborg Film Festival, 2016

=== Awards and recognition ===
Year	Award	Category	Recipient	Result
2016	Screen Nation Film and Television Awards	Favourite International Movie	O-Town	Nominated
2016	Africa Movie Academy Awards	Most Promising Actor	Ifu Ennada	Nominated
2016	Africa Movie Academy Awards	Best Nigerian Film	O-Town	Nominated
2016	Africa Movie Academy Awards	Achievement in Soundtrack	O-Town	Won
