= Zulu African Film Academy Awards =

Annual awards ceremony in London, England

Zulu African Film Academy Awards, also known as ZAFAA Global Awards, is an annual ceremony that rewards African films in the diaspora. It has been held in London, United Kingdom since its inaugural edition in 2006. The 2015 and 2016 awards were planned to be celebrated in Africa for the first time. T
