= Who Wants to Be a Millionaire? (Nigerian game show) =

- Created by: David Briggs; Mike Whitehill; Steven Knight
- Presented by: Frank Edoho
- Country of origin: Nigeria

Original release
- Network: NTA; Africa Magic; Silverbird TV
- Release: 8 October 2004 – 25 June 2017
- Release: 20 March 2022 – 8 April 2023

Who Wants to Be a Millionaire? is a Nigerian quiz show based on the original British format of Who Wants to Be a Millionaire?. It first aired on 8 October 2004 and stopped temporarily on 25 June 2017. On 29 August 2017, a deal was secured with Airoplaycare behind the new sponsor after MTN Nigeria pulled out from the game show.

== Lifelines ==
=== Current ===
Three lifelines were presented at the beginning of the game in order to aid contestants:

- 50:50: The computer eliminates two random wrong options, leaving the right option and the other remaining wrong option.
- Phone a Friend: The contestant calls one of their five prearranged friends, who provided their phone numbers in advance. The contestant has 30 seconds to read the question and four possible options to the friend, who then has the remaining time to offer input.
- Ask the Host: The contestant can directly ask the host on his opinions on the question.

=== Former ===
- Ask the Audience: The contestant can ask the audience on what they think the correct answer is via a poll. Due to the COVID-19 pandemic, the 2022 revival does not have a studio audience, and thus can not have Ask the Audience available as a lifeline.

== Top prize winners ==
- Aroma Ufodike - ₦10,000,000 (September 11, 2009)

== Top prize losers ==
- Chukwuma Eze - ₦250,000 (March 7, 2016)

== Biggest winners other than top prize winners ==
- Osazuwa Osahon Daniels - ₦5,000,000 (June 19, 2009)
- Babatunde Oni Oladipo - ₦5,000,000 (2010)
- Nnaemeka Ubaekwena - ₦5,000,000 (January 1, 2012)
- Winifred E. Karieren - ₦5,000,000 [First female to win 5 million] (May 2012)
- Sammy Abraham - ₦5,000,000 (March 17, 2013)
- Olalowo Olatokun - ₦5,000,000 (2014)

== Final question right ==
Aroma's ₦10,000,000 question

₦10 million (15 of 15)

Professor Maathai Wangari won the Nobel Prize for which of these?

1. Literature
2. Economics
3. Peace(correct answer)
4. Medicine

On September 11, 2009, a contestant named Aroma Ufodike became the first person to win the ₦10 million, and he is the only winner of the top prize on the Nigerian Millionaire. One of the questions related to celebrated Nigerian football referee Linus Mbah. Just like in Slumdog Millionaire Mr. Ufodike was able to answer the question from his personal experience. Mr. Mbah lived in the apartment above him or, as Mr. Ufodike put it – "He lives on top of me!"

== Special editions ==
The Nigerian variation of Who Wants To Be A Millionaire has special editions which are recorded and broadcast at certain times of the year. The Valentine Special, which comes up around February, features couples being placed on the hot seat to answer questions for the money prize together. The Children Special edition is used to commemorate the Children's Day celebrations. It has featured children between the ages of 8–14 years of age from different backgrounds who came to play for 10 Million Naira in scholarships.

== Money trees ==
Here are the money trees that have been used on Millionaire throughout the years.

Payout structure
Question number	Question value (Yellow zones are guaranteed levels)		
Question number	2004–2006	2007–2017	2022–2023
1	₦5,000		
2	₦6,000	₦7,500	₦10,000
3	₦8,000	₦10,000	₦15,000
4	₦10,000	₦15,000	₦20,000
5	₦15,000	₦20,000	₦30,000
6	₦20,000	₦30,000	₦50,000
7	₦30,000	₦45,000	₦100,000
8	₦45,000	₦70,000	₦150,000
9	₦80,000	₦120,000	₦250,000
10	₦150,000	₦250,000	₦500,000
11	₦250,000	₦500,000	₦1,000,000
12	₦500,000	₦1,000,000	₦2,000,000
13	₦1,000,000	₦2,000,000	₦5,000,000
14	₦2,000,000	₦5,000,000	₦10,000,000
15	₦5,000,000	₦10,000,000	₦20,000,000
