= Omowumi Dada =

Nigerian actress (born 1989)

Omowunmi Dada
- Dada at the 2026 Toronto International Film Festival.
- Born: 2 October 1989 (age 37); Lagos, Lagos State, Nigeria
- Education: University of Lagos
- Occupation: Actress
- Years active: 2013–present

Omowunmi Dada (born 2 October 1989) is a Nigerian actress, best known for her role as Folake in the M-net television series Jemeji. She also appeared in the 2017 Yoruba-language film Somewhere in the Dark, which won the award for Best Indigenous Film at the 2017 Africa Magic Viewers' Choice Awards (AMVCA). For her performance, she received a nomination for Best Supporting Actress (Yoruba) at the Best of Nollywood Awards in 2017. In 2018, Dada voiced the titular character in Sade, Nigeria's first animation full-length feature film.

In addition to acting, Dada is a voice-over artist, presenter, model and brand ambassador for Jumia Nigeria. She aspires to become a film director and producer.

== Early life ==
Dada was born in Lagos State, where she attended Ifako International Nursery and Primary School for her primary education, during this time, she became a member of the Yoruba Cultural Troupe. She went on to attend Command Day Secondary School, Oshodi, for her secondary education and studied creative arts at the University of Lagos.

== Career ==
Dada began her acting career, taking small parts in stage plays while at the university. Her first major stage performance was in the play Moremi Ajasoro, which was directed by Femi Oke. In 2013, she began her movie career with a role in the film Oya alongside Nigerian actor Tunji Sotimirin, she then went on to feature in other notable films including the Kunle Afolayan directed Omugwo alongside Patience Ozokwor and Ayo Adesanya.

Dada has featured in several television series, including the Ebonylife TV series Married to the Game, Best Friends and Dere, an African adaptation of Disney's Cinderella. She also featured in the M-net television series Jemeji and has had roles in Tinsel, So Wrong so Wright, Needles Eyes and Bella’s Place among others.

In 2017, Dada featured in the critically acclaimed stage play, Isale Eko, which was endorsed by the Lagos State Government as part of the official activities marking the state’s 50th anniversary.

In 2018, Dada was cast in the titular role of Sade in Nigeria's first full-length animated feature film, which was set for release in 2019.

Dada featured in Tunde Kelani's film Ayinla, alongside Kunle Afolayan and Lateef Adedimeji.

In December 2017, she was nominated as Best Actress of the Year in Nigeria by Nigerian filmmaker and critic, Charles Novia.

Dada is an ambassador for the Daivyan Children Cancer Foundation, which advocates for awareness and support for children living with cancer. She is also an ambassador for the Brian Wotari Foundation, which focuses on engaging and enriching the lives of youths.

In 2021, Dada played the role of an investigative journalist, Halima Abdul in the Psalm Oderinde directed short film Rebirth, produced by Chris Odeh of Sozo Films for Homevida Masterclass, and written by Thecla Uzozie and Dawn Ntekim-Rex.

At the 8th Africa Magic Viewers' Choice Awards in 2022, she won Best Supporting Actress for her role in the film Country Hard.

== Filmography ==
=== Selected feature films ===
- The Gods are Still Not To Blame (2012)
- Ojuju (2014) as Peju
- The Antique (2015) as Uyi's Friend
- Somewhere in the Dark (2016)
- Yes I Don't (2016) as Mayen
- Omugwo (2017) as Omotunde
- Bias (2017)
- Something Wicked (2017) as Vivian
- Chatch-er (2017) as Eva Osaro
- King Invincible (2017) as Princess Morenike
- Bedroom Points (2018)
- The Ghost and the Tout (2018) as Janet
- Just Before I do (2018)
- Oga Bolaji (2018) as Victoria
- Like Dominoes (2018)
- The Family (2019)
- Diamonds in the Sky (2019) as Teniola
- Òlòtūré (2019) as Linda
- Sade (2019) as Sade
- Zena (2019) as Mahila
- The Man Who Cuts Tattoos (2019)
- City of Bastards (2019)
- Nightcrawlers (2020)
- The Sessions (2020) as Onome
- Reach (2020)
- Finding Hubby (2020) as Moroti
- The Blood Covenant
- Country Hard (2021) as Tola
- Elesin Oba, The King's Horseman (2022) as Bride
- One Too Many (2022) as Ehi
- Ada Omo Daddy (2023) as Perosola Balogun
- Domino Effect (2023) as Rita
- Funmilayo Ransome-Kuti (2024)
- Everybody Loves Jenifa (2024)
- Ori Rebirth (2025)

=== Short films ===
- Not Right (2014) as Kunnbi
- Mirabel (2018) as Tonye Brasin
- Losing My Religion (2018) as Mother
- Fourth Side (2019)
- Rebirth (2022) as Halimah

=== Television series ===
- Jemeji (2017) as Folake
- Tinsel
- So Wrong So Wright
- Needles Eyes
- Tales of Eve (2013) as Daniella
- Taste of Love
- Casino
- Game On (2020-2022) as Saze
- The Wages (2013) as Amaka
- Married To The Game- MTTG (2014-2015)
- Love, Lies & Alibi (2014)
- Alone (2018) as Eyal
- Shuga (2019) as Barbie
- The Origin: Madam Koi-Koi (2023) as Madam Koi-Koi

=== Animations ===
- Sade (TBA)

=== Select stage plays ===
- Isale Eko 2
- Oya
- For the Love of Country
- Nigeria the Beautiful
- Vision of St Bernadette
- Death and the King's Horseman
- Trials of Brother Jero

== Awards and nominations ==
Year	Award	Category	Result	Ref
2017	CRMA	Best Actress	Nominated	
2017	City People Movie Awards	Best Supporting Actress	Nominated	
2017	ELOY Awards	Best Actress on Big Screen and TV	Nominated	
2018	Best of Nollywood Awards	Best Actress in a Lead role –English	Nominated	
2019	Best of Nollywood Awards	Best Actress in a Lead role –English	Nominated	
2019	Best of Nollywood Awards	Best Actress in a Lead role –Yoruba	Nominated	
2019	Best of Nollywood Awards	Best Kiss in a Movie	Nominated	
2020	Best of Nollywood Awards	Best Actress in a Leading Role	Won	
2020	Best of Nollywood Awards	Best Kiss in a Movie	Nominated	
2022	Africa Magic Viewers' Choice Awards	Best Supporting Actress	Won	
2024	Africa Magic Viewers’ Choice Awards	Best Lead Actress	Nominated	
