= Tope Oshin =

Nigerian television and film director, producer, and casting director

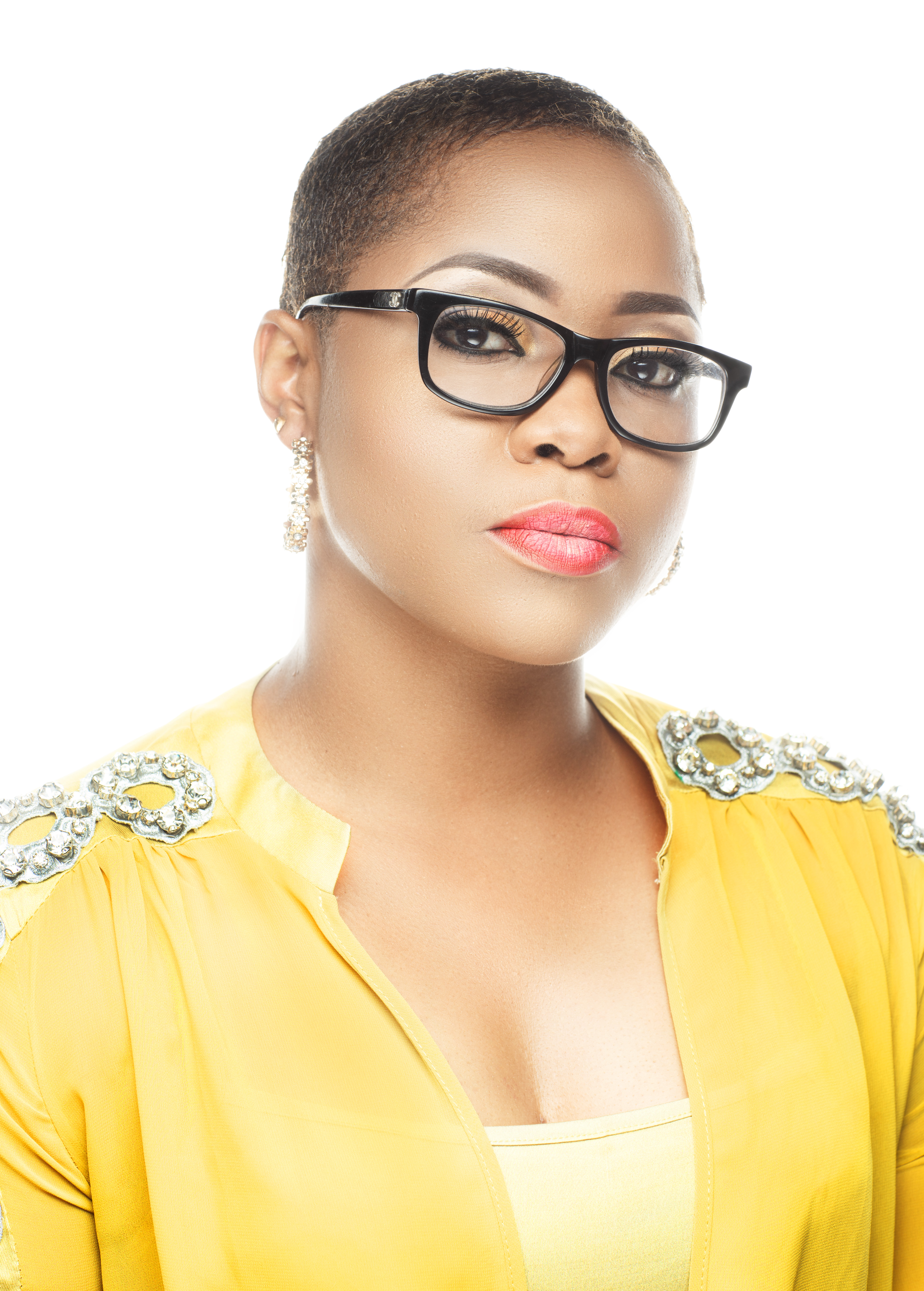
- Oshin in 2015
- Occupation: Filmmaker
- Years active: 1996-present
- Notable work: Shuga; Up North (film); The Wedding Party 2 Journey to Self; Tinsel (TV series); Fifty
- Spouses: Yinka Ogun (m. 2002; div. 2014); Daniel Ademinokan (m. 2023)
- Website: www.topeoshin.com

Tope Oshin is a Nigerian television and film director, producer and casting director, listed as one of the most influential Nigerians in film in 2019. In 2015 Pulse magazine named her as one of "9 Nigerian female movie directors you should know" in the Nollywood film industry. In March 2018, in commemoration of the Women's History Month, Tope was celebrated by OkayAfrica as one of the Okay100 Women. The interactive campaign celebrates extraordinary women from Africa and the diaspora making waves across a wide array of industries, while driving positive impact in their communities and the world at large.

== Early life and education ==
Tope hails from a devout Christian family. As a child, she engaged in drawing, singing, and dancing, and had aspirations to be a painter. She studied Economics at the University of Ilorin, Kwara State, and then Theatre Arts, TV & Film Production at Lagos State University. She became more interested in filmmaking and later studied Film Production, and Cinematography at Colorado Film School of the Community College of Aurora, Denver, and Met Film School, Ealing Studios, London respectively. Tope is also an alumnus of 'Talents Durban' and Berlinale Talents, a networking summit of select outstanding creatives from the world of film and drama series across the globe.

== Career ==
Tope, who was an actor for 12 years, featuring in films like Relentless (2010 film), before veering into directing, working as an associate producer and assistant director for The Apprentice Africa. and has since become known for directing popular African TV dramas and soap operas such as Hush, Hotel Majestic, Tinsel (TV series) and MTV Shuga. Though she has directed and produced several introspective short film projects such as The Young Smoker, Till Death Do Us Part, New Horizons and Ireti, she is known best for her highly successful 2018 feature film releases Up North (film), and New Money.

Oshin has produced some of the highest box office breaking movies in Nigeria, including the 2015 romantic film Fifty, about four fifty-year-old female Lagos residents, which broke box office records upon release in December 2015, taking N20 million in the first weekend. and The Wedding Party 2, as at 2018, the highest grossing Nigerian film.

In 2016, she produced and directed the documentary, Amaka's Kin: The Women Of Nollywood, as a memorial to prominent filmmaker Amaka Igwe, who died in 2014. The documentary addresses issues facing Nigerian female directors, working in a male-dominated industry.

As a follow-up to her documentary, in 2017, and as part of the BBC 100 Women season, Tope celebrated the new generation of women filmmakers reinventing Nollywood, by presenting the BBC documentary Nigeria-Shooting It Like A Woman. Apart from the BBC World Service documentary, Tope's Amaka's Kin - The Women Of Nollywood also influenced a lot of other TV shows and literary works alike, including Niran Adedokun's book Ladies Calling the Shots.

Oshin racked up some controversy in Nigeria, when she co-wrote, directed and produced the Queer film We Don't Live Here Anymore (2018 film) for human rights organization TIERs (The Initiative For Equal Rights) in 2018. The movie was not accepted for a cinema release and received only a limited online release with FilmOne Distribution in 2018. We Don't Live Here Anymore however screened at Africa In Motion Film Festival in Glasgow, and also racked up a lot of nominations and awards surprisingly at 2018 Best Of Nollywood Awards in Nigeria. The film can be found currently on Amazon.

Tope also has a thriving career as a Casting director and has cast for several film and television projects including all 3 Nigerian seasons of the MTV Staying Alive Foundation drama series Shuga.

Tope, through her company Sunbow Productions [ng], was commissioned to produce Season 8 of MTV Shuga (TV Series), dubbed MTV Shuga Naija 4, and is credited as Head Director, Showrunner, Executive Producer and Producer, after directing and casting Season 6 of the show in 2017.

In 2015 Tope served as a juror for the International Emmy Award for the first time.

== Personal life ==
Tope's 2002 marriage to screenwriter, Yinka Ogun, ended in 2014. The union produced four children.

== Filmography ==
=== Feature films ===
Year	Title	Role		Ref
Year	Title	Director	Producer	Ref
2012	Journey to Self	Yes	No	
2015	Fifty	No	Yes	
2017	The Wedding Party 2	No	Yes	
2017	In Line	Yes	No	
2018	New Money	Yes	No	
2018	We Don't Live Here Anymore	Yes	Yes	
2018	Up North	Yes	No	
2022	Here Love Lies	Yes	Yes	

=== Short films ===
Year	Title	Role				Ref
Year	Title	Director	Producer	Writer	Editor	Ref
2011	The Young Smoker	Yes	Yes	No	No	
2013	New Horizons	Yes	Yes	No	No	
2013	Till Death Do Us Part	Yes	Yes	No	No	
2014	Crush	Yes	Yes	Yes	Yes	
2015	Ireti	Yes	Yes	Yes	No	

=== Documentaries ===
Year	Title	Role				Ref
Year	Title	Director	Producer	Writer	Presenter	Ref
2016	Amaka’s Kin: The Women of Nollywood.	Yes	Yes	Yes	No	
2017	Nigeria: Shooting It Like A Woman	No	No	No	Yes	

=== Television ===
Year	Title	Role					Ref
Year	Title	Director	Producer	Writer	Casting director	Other	Ref
2008	Maltina Dance All	No	No	No	No	Presenter	
2009	Moments With Mo	No	Yes	No	No		
2009 - 2013	Tinsel (TV series)	Yes	No	No	No	Box/Content producer	
2012	Bridges	Yes	No	No	No		
2013	Conversations At Dinner	Yes	Yes	No	Yes		
2013	Love and War	Yes	Yes	No	Yes		
2014	Walk The Talk	Yes	Yes	No	No		
2015	Hotel Majestic	Yes	No	No	No		
2016	GidiUp 3 (Unaired)	Yes	No	No	No		
2016	EvoL	Yes	Yes	Yes	Yes		
2016	Hush	Yes	No	No	No		
2017	BattleGround	Yes	No	No	No	Consultant	
2017	Ever After (TV Feature)	Yes	Yes	Yes	Yes		
2018	MTV Shuga Season 6	Yes	No	No	Yes		
2019	MTV Shuga Naija Season 4	Yes	Yes	No	Yes	Executive producer	

== Awards and nominations ==
Year	Award	Category	Film	Result	Ref
2011	In-short film festival	Audience Prize	The Young Smoker	Won	
2011	In-short film festival	Special Jury Mention	The Young Smoker	Won	
2011	In-short film festival	Best Director	The Young Smoker	Nominated	
2011	In-short film festival	Best Film	The Young Smoker	Nominated	
2011	TAVA (The Audio Visual Awards)	Best Directing	Tinsel	Won	
2012	Abuja International Film Festival	Best Short Film	Till Death Do Us Part	Won	
2012	In-short film festival	Best Film	Till Death Do Us Part	Won	
2012	In-short film festival	Best Director	Till Death Do Us Part	Won	
2012	TAVA (The Audio Visual Awards)	Most Outstanding Short Film	Till Death Do Us Part	Nominated	
2012	TAVA (The Audio Visual Awards)	Most Outstanding Short Film	The Young Smoker	Nominated	
2012	Africa Movie Academy Awards	Best Short Film	The Young Smoker	Nominated	
2012	Abuja International Film Festival	Outstanding Film in Directing	Till Death Do Us Part	Nominated	
2012	Abuja International Film Festival	Best Short Film	The Young Smoker	Nominated	
2013	Slum Film Festival	Best Narrative Film	The Young Smoker	Won	
2013	Best of Nollywood Awards	Best Movie With A Social Message	Journey To Self	Won	
2013	Zulu African Film Academy Awards	Best Director	Journey To Self	Nominated	
2013	Nollywood Movies Awards	Best Director	Journey To Self	Nominated	
2013	Nollywood Movies Awards	Best Movie	Journey To Self	Nominated	
2013	Nollywood Movies Awards	Best Short Film	Till Death Do Us Part	Nominated	
2014	Teens Favorite Awards	Teens Favorite TV & Film Producer	—N/a	Won	
2014	Africa Movie Academy Awards	Special Jury Award	New Horizons	Won	
2014	Nigerian Broadcast & Media Awards	Best Program Director	Tinsel	Nominated	
2014	Nigerian Broadcast & Media Awards	Best TV Drama	New Horizons	Nominated	
2014	Nigerian Entertainment Awards	Best Director	Journey To Self	Nominated	
2014	Best of Nollywood Awards	Best Short Film	New Horizons	Nominated	
2015	Golden Movie Awards	Golden Short Award	New Horizons	Won	
2016	Lagos Entertainment Awards	Director Of The Year	—N/a	Nominated	
2016	Exquisite Lady Of The Year Awards	Best Producer of The Year	Fifty	Nominated	
2016	Nigerian Creatives Award	Creative Personae of the year	—N/a	Nominated	
2016	Divas Awards	Filmmaker of the year	—N/a	Nominated	
2016	Abuja International Film Festival, Nigeria	Best Short Film	Ireti	Nominated	
2016	Africa Movie Academy Awards	Best Short Film	Ireti	Nominated	
2016	Golden Movie Awards	Golden Short Award	Ireti	Nominated	
2016	Nigerian Broadcast & Media Awards	Best TV Program Director	Tinsel	Won	
2016	Women's Only Entertainment Film Festival	Best International Short Film	Ireti	Won	
2016	Women's Only Entertainment Film Festival	Best International Female Director	Ireti	Won	
2016	Best of Nollywood Awards	Best Documentary	Amaka’s Kin: The Women of Nollywood	Won	
2017	Africa Magic Viewers Choice Awards	Best Documentary	Amaka’s Kin: The Women of Nollywood	Nominated	
2017	Africa Magic Viewers Choice Awards	Best Short Film	Ireti	Nominated	
2017	City People Entertainment Awards	Best Director Of The Year	—N/a	Won	
2017	Ebonylife TV Sisterhood Awards	Director Of The Year	—N/a	Nominated	
2018	Best of Nollywood Awards	Best Director of The Year	We Don’t Live Here Anymore	Won	
2018	Best of Nollywood Awards	Best Movie of The Year	We Don’t Live Here Anymore	Won	
2018	Best of Nollywood Awards	Best Editing	We Don’t Live Here Anymore	Won	
2018	Best of Nollywood Awards	Best Screenplay of The Year	We Don’t Live Here Anymore	Nominated	
2018	RealTime Film Festival	Best Movie By A Female African Filmmaker	In Line	Won	
2019	Africa Movie Academy Awards	Best Nigerian Film	Up North	Nominated	
2021	7th Annual Hollywood Weekly Magazine Film Festival & Awards	Best Director	In Line	Won	
2021	ReFrame	The ReFrame Stamp Award	Here Love Lies	Won	

=== Honors ===
- OkayAfrica Okay100 Women 2017 Honoree
- Excellence in The Creative Industries Award - Sisi Oge Awards 2018
- Distinguished Alumni Medal of Honor 2016 - In-short film festival
- African Woman In Film Award 2015 by African Women Development Fund
- Special Award For Outstanding Contribution To Film & TV In Nigeria - Eko Star Film & TV Awards by Lagos State Govt./Nigerian Film & TV Summit/Ebonylife Media 2021

== See also ==
- List of Nigerian film producers
- List of Youruba people
