= We Don't Live Here Anymore (2018 film) =

2018 LGBT Nigerian film

- Directed by: Tope Oshin
- Written by: Noni Salma
- Produced by: Olumide Makanjuola; Bose Oshin; Tope Oshin
- Starring: Omotunde Adebowale David; Francis Sule; Temidayo Akinboro; Osas Ighodaro
- Cinematography: Idhebor Kagho
- Edited by: Niyi Akinmolayan
- Music by: Kokare Morakinyo
- Release date: 14 October 2018 (Nigeria)
- Running time: 110 minutes
- Country: Nigeria
- Language: English

We Don't Live Here Anymore is a 2018 Nigerian film directed by Tope Oshin and produced by Olumide Makanjuola, Bose Oshin and Tope Oshin. The drama is based on the story of two LGBT high school students Chidi Egwuonwu (Temidayo Akinboro) and Tolu Bajulaye (Francis Sule). The boys are in love with each other and have to deal with discrimination regarding their relationship.

In 2018, We Don't Live Here Anymore won two awards (Movie of the Year and Tope Oshin for Director of the Year) during the 10th edition of the 2018 Best of Nollywood Awards (BON).

The film stars Osas Ighodaro as Leslie, Omotunde Adebowale David as Ms. Wilson Francis Sule, Temidayo Akinboro, Funlola Aofiyebi, and Katherine Obiang. The movie premiered in Lagos at IMAX Cinemas, Lekki on 14 October 2018.

The film was sponsored by The Initiative For Equal Rights (TIERS).

== Plot ==
Two students who are in love with each other are caught in a sexual relationship on the premises of Prominence High School. Nike Bajulaye and Nkem Egwuonwu, their mothers, are contacted by the school authorities. They are informed that their children may be expelled from school. They reacted differently to learning the sexual status of their children: Nike Bajulaye tries to wipe out the shame brought to her family by her son, and Nkem Egwuonwu supports her son and accepts him the way he is.

== Cast ==
- Francis Sule as Tolu Bajulaye
- Temidayo Akinboro as Chidi Egwuonwu
- Funlola Aofiyebi as Nike Bajulaye
- Katherine Obiang as Nkem Egwuonwuo
- Osas Ighodaro as Leslie
- Chris Iheuwa as Femi Bajulaye
- Abiodun Aleja as Principal
- Omotunde Adebowale David as Ms. Wilson
- Kunle Dada as Psychiatrist
- Funmi Eko as Isioma

== Accolades ==
In 2018, We Don't Live Here Anymore had several nominations and awards at the 10th edition of the Best of Nollywood awards (BON) held in Kakanfo Conference Centre, Ibadan, Oyo State.

=== Awards and nominations ===
| Date | Award | Category | Result | Ref. |
|---|---|---|---|---|
| 2018 | Best of Nollwood Awards | Movie of the Year | Won | |
| 2018 | Best of Nollwood Awards | Director of the Year | Won | |
| 2018 | Best of Nollwood Awards | Movie with the Best Screenplay | Nominated | |
| 2018 | Best of Nollwood Awards | Movie with the Best Production Design | Nominated | |
| 2018 | Best of Nollwood Awards | Movie with the Best Editing | Nominated | |
| 2018 | Best of Nollwood Awards | Movie with the Best Cinematography | Nominated | |
