= Riverwood Academy Awards =

Kenian film award

Riverwood Academy Awards is an annual Kenyan film award founded by Mwaniki Mageria. It was formed with a goal to recognize and celebrate local productions, low budget film making and nurture talent by creating opportunities for training players in the industry on how to tell Kenyan stories in a Kenyan way. Riverwood Academy Awards started on 17 March 2014. The first River wood Awards was held at Alliance Francaise and well known people in film industry attended also the former Cabinet Secretary of Sports, Culture and the Arts; Dr. Hassan Wario Arero was among the guest of honors who attended.

== Riverwood Awards 2014 ==
BEST SCRIPTWRITER

- Susan Kadide – Stara

Best Sound

- Iya Embasna

Best Editing

- Godrey Kimotho – Ithe wa Mwana

Best Original Score

- 24Th Anniversary

Best Cinematography

- Gicagi

Best Supporting Actress in a tv Series

- Ruth Wacuka – Housemates

Best Supporting Actor in a tv Series

- Alex Mwaura – Maisha Bure

Best Lead Actress in a tv Series

- Janet Mbunga – Housemates

Best Lead Actor in a tv Series

- Samuel Kaguora –Maisha Bure

Best tv Series

- Maisha Bure

Best Supporting Actor in a Feature Film

- Jonathan Mbithi – ala Makai

Best Supporting Actress in a Feature Film

- Margaret Wambui- Wretched

Best Lead Actor in a Feature Film

- Thomas Oyolo – Mheshimiwa

Best Lead Actress in a Feature Film

- Muthoni Thiongo – Tamed

Best Director

- Mwendwa Mutua – Tamed

Best Feature

- Ithe wa Mwana

== Riverwood Awards 2017-2018 ==
Year	Awards	Actress	Ref
2017	Elimu tales	Raymond Ofula	
2017	Best actor in film	Samuel Ngunjiri	
2017	Best Cinematography	Lucas Sakwa	
2017	Best Lead Actress in a TV series	Millicent Ogutu	
2018	Best Documentary	Samuel Wanjohi	
