= Tade Ogidan =

Nigerian film director

- Born: Lagos, Nigeria
- Citizenship: Nigerian
- Occupations: screenwriter; director; producer; Dramatist
- Notable work: Family on Fire; Dangerous Twins

Akintade Ogidan, aka Tade Ogidan (born July 1960), is a Nigerian film and television screenwriter, producer, and director.

== Early life ==
Born in Lagos, Nigeria, to middle-class parents Akinola and Rachael Ogidan, he grew up in Surulere, a suburb of Lagos State in Nigeria.

== Education ==
He had his elementary school education from the mid ‘60s into the ‘70s at Government Demonstration School and Surulere Baptist School, both in Surulere, Lagos. Between 1972 and 1974, he attended secondary school at Ekiti Parapo College, Ido-Ekiti, and graduated from Maryland Comprehensive Secondary School, Ikeja, Lagos, in 1978. From 1979, Ogidan attended Eastern New Mexico University in Portales, NM, USA. He completed a short stint at the State University of New York, in Buffalo, NY, USA.

== TV ==
From 1982 to 1983, Tade Ogidan completed the government-mandated National Youth Service Corp program at the Nigerian Television Authority (NTA) in Lagos, after which he became a full-time producer/director with NTA Channel 10 and a continuity announcer with NTA 2 - Channel 5, both in Lagos, Nigeria. Ogidan spent 8 years with the Nigerian Television Authority (NTA 10, NTA 2 - Channel 5 and NTA National Network Service and projects).

At NTA, he produced/directed several episodes of the PLAY OF THE WEEK drama series, the TELE THEATRE drama series, the LEGAL ANGLE series, THE NEW VILLAGE HEADMASTER drama series, and a handful of DRAMA specials on NTA National Network. He gained renown as the producer/director of hit episodes such as Blinking Hope, The Boys Next Door, and To Save a Falling Angel. One of the drama projects worked on then, THE REIGN OF ABIKU, written by Sola Osofisan, won several awards at the Nigerian Festival of Television Programmes, NIFETEP 1986.

He also worked on the magazine show SUNNY SIDE OF LIFE, hosted by Patrick Ityohegh, and other projects that Peter Ighou and Chris Ebie were executive producers on.

== Movies ==
Tade Ogidan left the NTA for private productions in 1990 and set up OGD PICTURES, LTD. OGD is coined from his last name, OGIDAN. He has since written, produced, and directed hit movie projects like Hostages, Owo Blow, Diamond Ring, Out Of Bounds, Raging Storm, 7 – 12, Playing Games, Saving Alero, Dangerous Twins, Madam Dearest, Ayo Mi Da Family On Fire, and Gold Statue most of which are multiple award winners in and outside Nigeria.

== Other television projects ==
Tade Ogidan and the OGD PICTURES team have worked on other projects for broadcast on television, such as BEHIND THE SIEGE (seasons 1 & 2 written by Tosin James Atega (I Am James) (a series done in collaboration with FHI/USAID), CRIME FIGHTERS (with BI COMMUNICATIONS), the TEJU BABYFACE SHOW, THE INTERN (an entrepreneurial reality TV show produced by Ofem Ofem), and The Next Titan (an entrepreneurial reality TV show with Mide Akinlaja, FICOMMS LTD).

== Production of TV commercials ==
Tade Ogidan and his team at OGD PICTURES worked on a number of TVCs for advertising agencies like Prima Garnet, Verdant Zeal, Lintas, etc., packaging TVCs for Crystal Bank, First Bank, FCMB, ABC Wax, Nigeria Export Processing Zone, Nigeria Airways, Royco, Maggi, Ajinomoto Seasoning, Close Up Toothpaste, Arik Air, etc.

== Major live events ==
The Lagos State Governor's Education Awards in 2013 was packaged by the Tade Ogidan-led OGD team. It was a major musical show featuring over 100 Lagos State Public Secondary School pupils performing alongside Nigerian movie stars like Femi Adebayo, Bello, Iya Awero, Yomi Fash Lanso, Sola Sobowale, Ireti Osayemi, Gideon Okeke, and Faithia Balogun.

Tade Ogidan also packaged the 2014 edition of the Lagos State Governor's Education Awards, a live musical drama that featured over 200 Lagos State Public Secondary School pupils performing alongside TV/movie stars like Bimbo Manuel, Sola Sobowale, Patience Ozokwor, Hafiz Oyetoro (Saka), Yinka Akanbi, Femi Adebayo, Gloria Young, Lepacious Bose, etc.

== OGD All Stars Novelty music project ==
While working on the soundtrack of Madam Dearest (Aya Mi Owon), the hit movie, with several film and TV stars, several musical tracks, and videos titled OGD ALL STARS emerged. A first of a kind in Nigeria, it featured stars Richard Mofe-Damijo, Stella Damasus Aboderin, Ramsey Nouah, Segun Arinze, Yinka Akanbi, Akin Lewis, Sola Sobowale, Deji Adenuga, Lanre Balogun, Lizzy Bariya, Dorin Onasanya, Teju Babyface, Saheed Balogun, Kunle Afolayan, Gabriel Afolayan, Funke Akindele, Akin Oyelola, Ab, Sola Onomor, Precious, Florence Wilkie, Bolu, Keppy Ekpenyong, Tina Mba, Kate Henshaw, Bimbo Akintola, 2-Effects, Remi Oshodi, Bukky Ajayi, Basorge Tariah Jr., Bimbo Manuel, Esse Agesse, Yemi Solade, Ope Ayeola, Shaggy, Shedrack, Tunji Olugbodi, Sunday Afolabi, Wande Coal, etc.

== Personal life ==
Tade Ogidan is married with children.

== Filmography ==
| Year | Title | Directed |
|---|---|---|
| 1995 | Owo Blow | Tade Ogidan |
| 1997 | Out of Bounds | Tade Ogidan |
| 1998 | Hostages | Tade Ogidan |
| 1998 | Diamond Ring | Tade Ogidan |
| 2001 | Saving Alero | Tade Ogidan |
| 2003 | Ayomida | Tade Ogidan |
| 2012 | Playing games | Tade Ogidan |
| 2004 | Dangerous Twins | Tade Ogidan |
| 2005 | Aya mi òwòn: Madam Dearest | Tade Ogidan |
| 2011 | Family on Fire | Tade Ogidan |
| 2019 | Gold Statue | Tade Ogidan |

== Awards and nominations ==
| Year | Award | Category | Result | Ref |
|---|---|---|---|---|
| 2019 | Best of Nollywood Awards | Director of the Year | Nominated | |

== See also ==
- List of Nigerian film producers
