= Ufuoma McDermott =

Nigerian actor & model (born 1981)

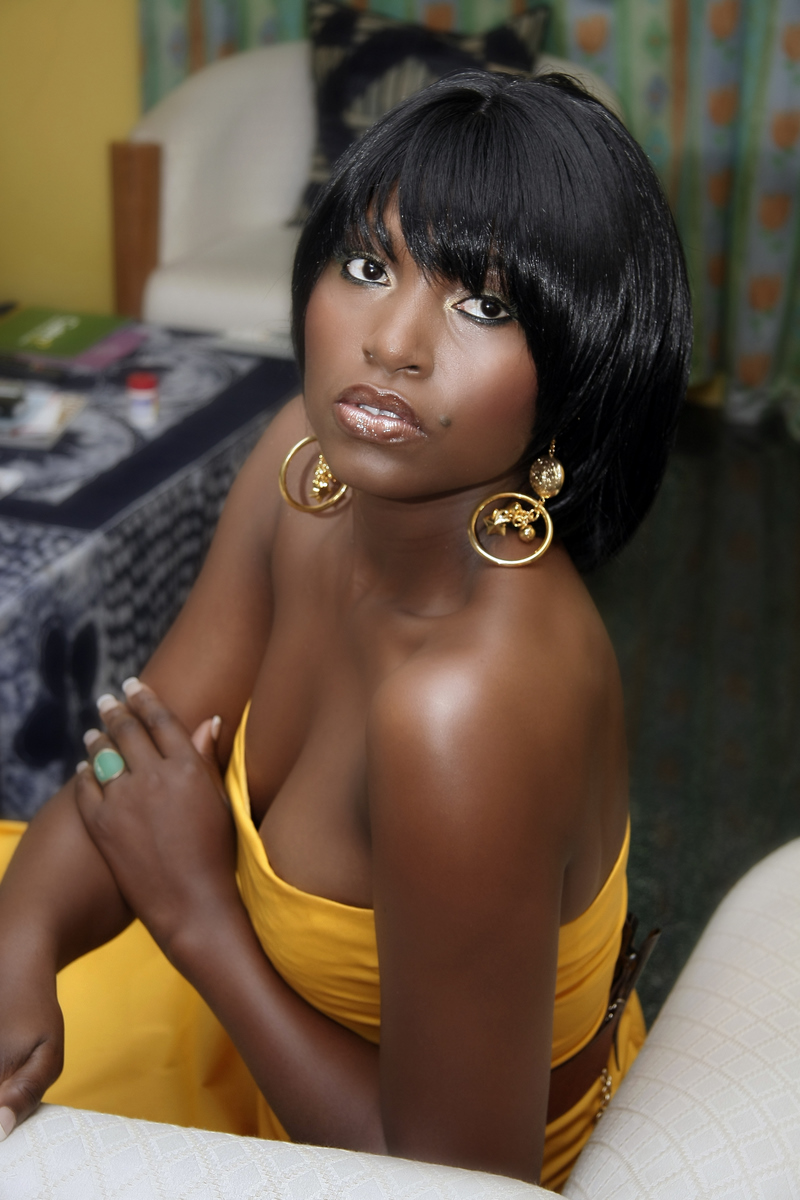
- Ufuoma Ejenobor at a photo shoot in 2008
- Born: Ufuoma Stacey Ejenobor; 23 April 1981 (age 45); Benin City, Edo, Nigeria
- Citizenship: Nigeria
- Education: University of Lagos
- Occupations: Actor, Presenter, Producer, Film Director.
- Years active: 2004–present
- Notable work: The President Must Not Die
- Spouse: Steven McDermott (m. 2010)
- Children: 2

Ufuoma Stacey McDermott (née Ejenobor /uːˈfoʊmə ˈɛdʒənəbɔːr/ oo-FOH-mə EJ-ə-nə-bor; born 23 April 1981) is a Nigerian actress, director, former model and beauty pageant titleholder.

== Early life ==
Ejenobor was born in Benin City to Nigerian parents of Urhobo descent who hails from Delta State in Nigeria. She moved a lot – from Benin City to Jos, where she spent the better part of her toddler years, and later to Lagos, where she has lived for the greater part of her life and still resides till date. At the age of seven, her father coined a pet name for her: ISIO (which means "star" in Urhobo). She was so named after the star actress of the TELEFEST programme put together by NTA Benin, The Pot of Life.

== Personal life ==
Ejenobor got married on 23 April 2010 to Steven McDermott. She officially changed her name to Ufuoma McDermott on 23 May 2014 at a Lagos high court.

In an October 2024 interview with Chude Jideonwo, McDermott revealed a 12-year battle with Kidney disease before being diagnosed with stage 3 in 2023.

== Education ==
She went through Alama Private School Jos, Plateau state, Tunwase Nursery and primary school Ikeja, Lagos and finally Molly International Nursery and primary Ajao Estate for her nursery and primary education. She then attended Federal Government College, Odogbolu, Ogun State for her secondary education.

McDermott has a degree in French Language from the University of Lagos where she partook in a Federal Government scholarship holiday programme, as well as a master's degree in Public and International Affairs, also from the University of Lagos. She also has certificates and diplomas from the Alliance Française and NIIT.

In 2011, she attended New York Film Academy in Los Angeles for an acting course and later on a film making course from Dov Simen's Hollywood Film Institute. In 2013, she obtained a certificate in Human resource management from the London Business School.

In Summer 2015, she was part of the Relativity Education program from Nigeria, owned by Relativity Media in Beverly Hills.

== Entertainment ==
She started a career in entertainment with modelling in 2000 as a photographic model and later moved on to the runway and beauty pageants.

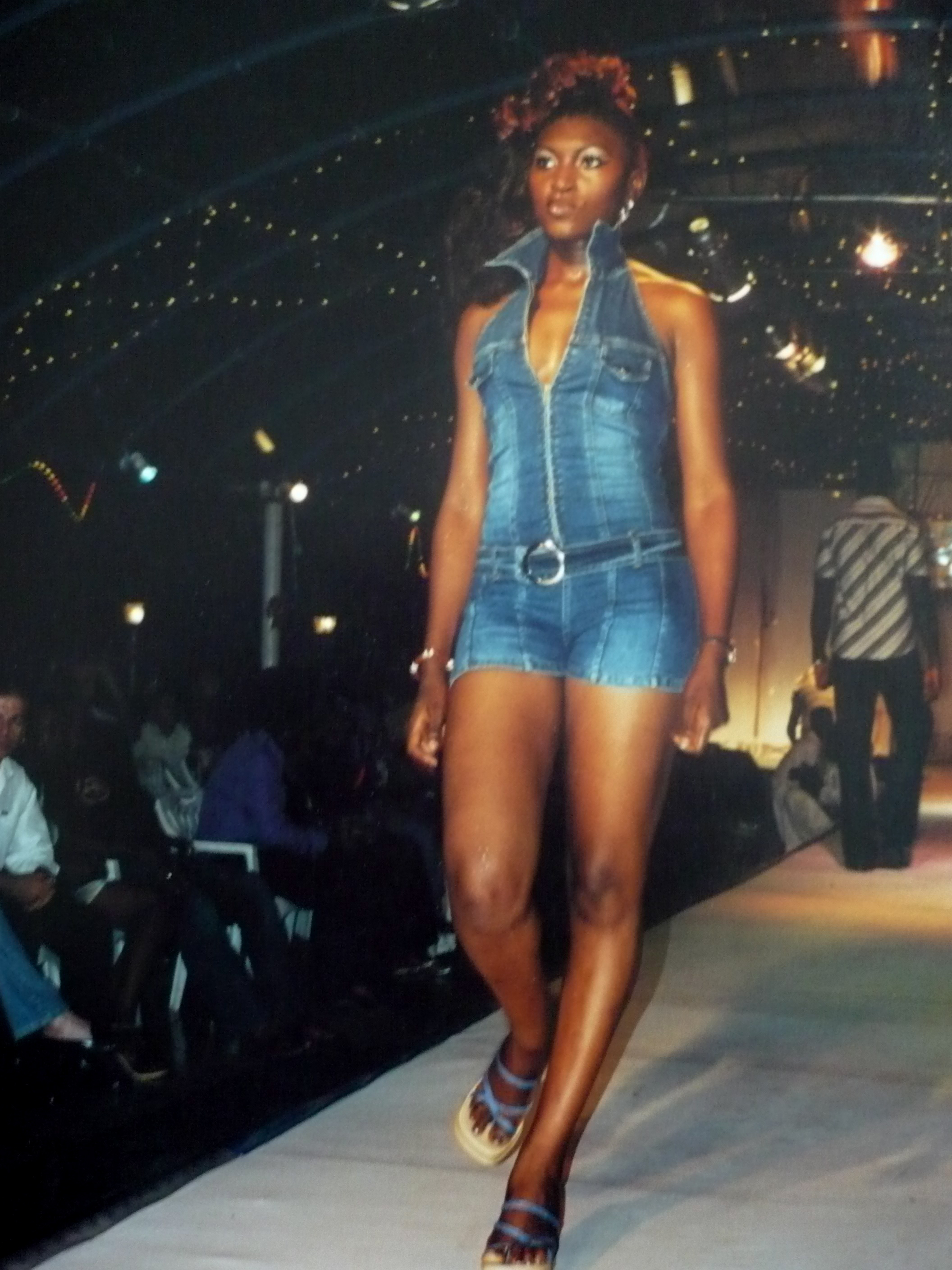
Ufuoma Ejenobor on the runway for Collectibles

=== Pageants ===
By 2002, she had participated in two mini-pageants, won the Miss Ebony beauty pageant and partaken in her first national pageant: Miss Commonwealth (Vanessa Ekeke), where she won the Miss Congeniality prize. Later the same year, she emerged 1st runner up in the queen Afrik beauty pageant (Tamilore Kuboye).

2003 saw her in the Queen of all Nations beauty pageant (Dubra Fufeyin) where she was again the 1st runner up.

In 2004 she contested in the Miss Nigeria beauty pageant where she emerged ...yet, 1st runner up. Not long after she was crowned Miss Earth Nigeria and consequently went to represent the country at the Miss Earth 2004

=== Film ===
In February 2004, Ejenobor decided on a movie career. Starting off with Zeb Ejiro's The President Must Not Die, she has continued to have roles in movies. In May 2005, she played her first lead role in Life and Death, her third movie after The President Must Not Die and Guy on the Line. By December 2005, she played Chibuzor on the Edge of Paradise TV series produced by Royal Roots network.

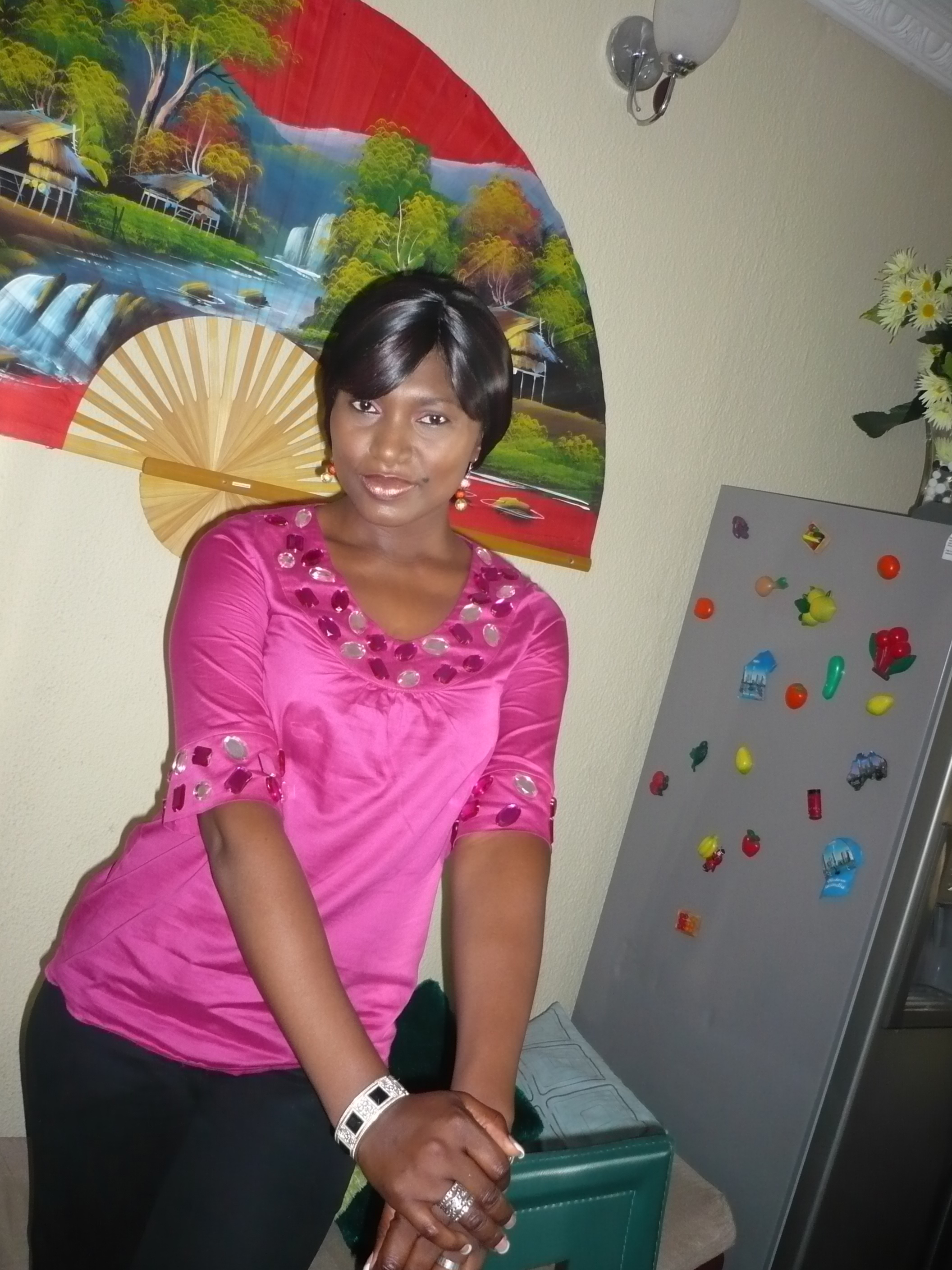
Ufuoma Ejenobor on the set of My Mum and I as "Lillian Wright"

In 2008 she took on the role of "Lillian Wright" in the TV series My Mum and I a role that garnered her a nomination for a best actress award at the 2010 Festival de Télévision de Monte-Carlo and one at The Terracotta Nigerian TV and Film Awards. She was nominated as the Actor of the year 2011 at the Future Awards

=== Stage ===
In January 2018, McDermott reprised her roles as "Mama Baby", "Women Call Leader" and "Sister Esther" in the stage production Hear Word!, which returned for the second year in a row to Harvard and was staged at the prestigious American Repertory theatre in Cambridge, Massachusetts, U.SA. The production covers various themes, which address issues against women in the society. The play, which made its debut in Lagos, Nigeria in 2014, also features the acting talents of Joke Silva, Taiwo Ajayi-Lycett, Elvina Ibru and Bimbo Akintola.

Hear Word! featured at the Edinburgh International Festival in August 2019, and McDermott, Joke Silva, Taiwo Ajayi-Lycett and other cast members performed at the Royal Lyceum, in Edinburgh, Scotland. The Guardian UK, in its review of the show described it as "at once tough and inspirational", giving the play a three-star out of five.

=== The USM Show with Ufuoma McDermott ===
In July 2019, McDermott put together a live-theater experience at the Eko Hotel and Towers in Lagos, tagged "The USM Show with Ufuoma McDermott". The event was a potpourri of live music, dance performances and a debut of her stage production "The Magic of a Dream".

The Magic of a Dream was directed by Toritseju Ejoh and featured acting performances from several notable Nigerian thespians including Femi Branch, Chioma Akpotha, Offiong Anthony (Thin Tall Tony), Akah Nnani and Zara Udofia-Ejoh. The USM Show also featured live musical and comedy performances from a range of Nigerian entertainers, including, Teni the entertainer, Seyi Law and MC Abbey.

=== Movie Directing/Production ===
At the premiere of her movie directorial debut, McDermott revealed that she had begun writing the story for the film Christmas is Coming in 2013. The movie was however released in November 2017 ahead of the Christmas holidays.

In 2018, she earned her sophomore production credit with the release of What Just Happened in cinemas across Nigeria.

=== Recognition ===
- Best Actress in a TV series Nominee – Nigeria Entertainment Awards 2011
- Actor of the Year 2011 Nominee- The Future Awards
- Best Actress nominee – Golden Nymph Awards 2010 (Monte Carlo Television Festival)
- Best Actress in a Drama series nominee, Terracotta TV and Film Awards
- Go Red Africa, Best Female Model, 2007
- African Youth Society, Role Model Award, 2009
- Represented Nigeria at the Miss Earth 2004 beauty pageant
- McDermott was a speaker at TEDx Rayfield, which held in December 2017

Pageant

Year	Pageant	Status
2004	Miss Earth Nigeria	Winner
2004	Miss Nigeria	1st Runner up
2003	Queen of all Nation	1st Runner up
2002	Queen Afrik	1st Runner up
2002	Miss Commonwealth	Miss Congeniality
2001	Miss Ebony	Winner

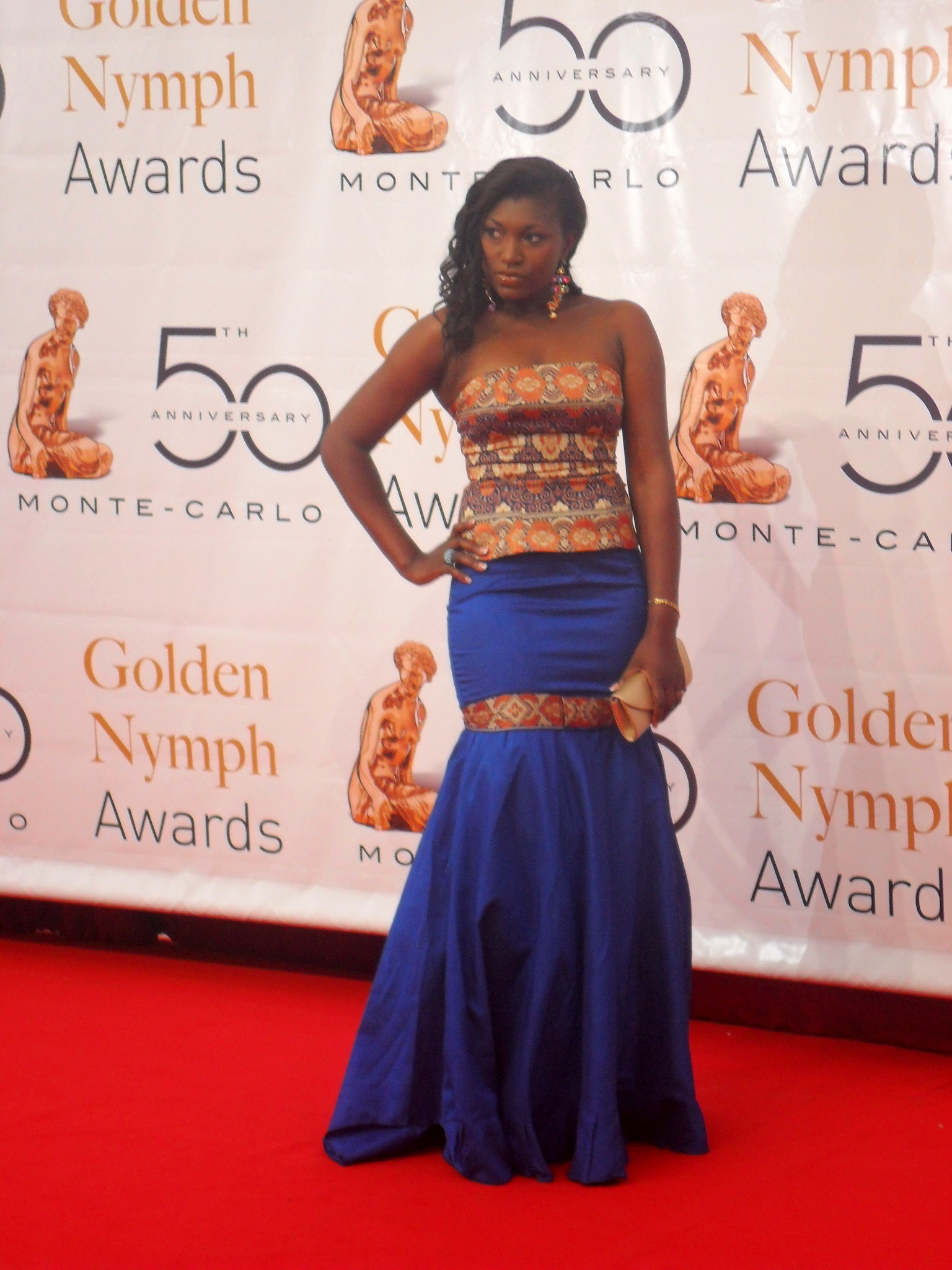
Ufuoma Ejenobor at the Golden Nymph Awards

Ufuoma Ejenobor and LL Cool J at the 50th Golden Nymph awards in Monaco

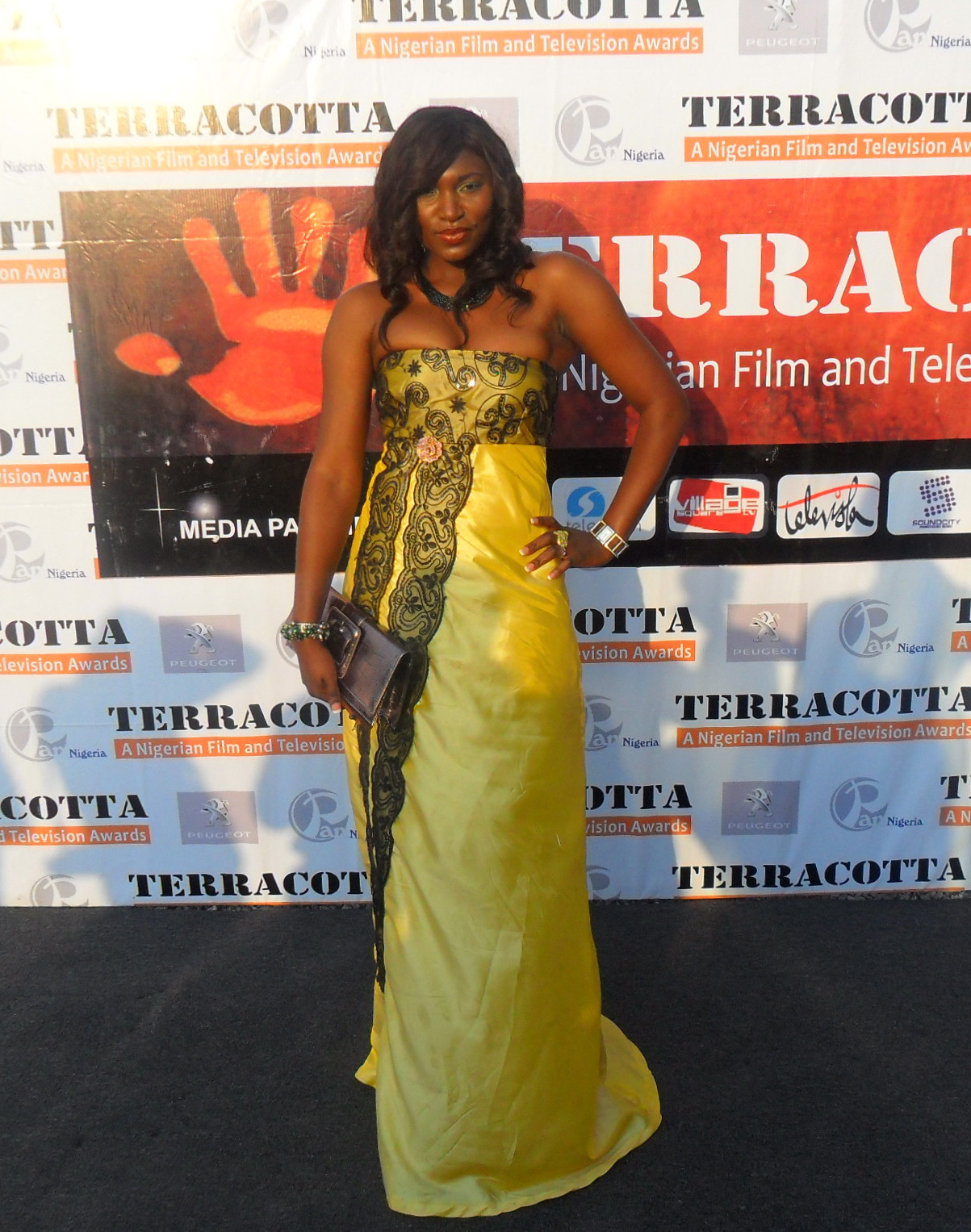
Ufuoma Ejenobor at the 2010 Terracotta Awards

Ufuoma Ejenobor and John McCook

Ufuoma also received a Golden Nymph Best Actress nomination at the 2010 Monte Carlo Television Festival alongside Tina Fey, Jane Krakowski and January Jones.

== Awards ==
Year	Award	Category	Note	Ref
2003	Nigerian French Village	Fille Africaine	Won	
2007	African heart foundation at The African Fashion show	Best Model	Won	
2009	African Youth Society	Role Model Award	Won	
2010	Golden Nymph Award at the Monte Carlo Television Festival	Best Actress in a comedy	Nominated	
2010	Terracotta Television and Film Awards	Best Actress in a drama series	Nominated	
2011	The Future Awards	Best Actress	Nominated	
2014	AMVCA Africa Magic Viewers choice awards	Best New media-Online video	Nominated	
2015	Delta Entertainment Awards	Most Outstanding Actress	Won	
2016	ELOY Awards	Actress (Big screen)	Nominated	
2017	City People Awards	Best Actress	Won	
2017	2017 Best of Nollywood Awards	Best Actress in a Lead role –English	Nominated	
2017	2017 Best of Nollywood Awards	Best Kiss in a Movie	Nominated	

== Filmography ==
Year	Film	Role	Notes
2004	The President Must Not Die	Detective- Supporting role	Film Director Zeb Ejiro starring Ibinabo Fiberesima, Enebeli Elebuwa- Released 2005
2004	Life Partner		Film Director Adim Williams also starring Jim Iyke, Lilian Bach
2004	Queen of My Heart	Claudia	Film Director Neville Ossai starring Rita Dominic, Clem Ohameze
2004	Secrets and Lies		TV mini-series
2005	Life and Death		*1st Lead Role. Film Director Bond Emeruwa starring Zack Orji, Emeka Ossai
2005	Guy on The Line		Film Director Jaja Michael starring Rita Dominic, Jim Iyke, Chidi Mokeme
2005	Missed Love		Film Director Adim Williams starring Oge Okoye, Hank Anuku, Jim Iyke
2005	Two Good Friends	Floxy	Film Directors Famous Otakpowen and Omoefe Kingsley starring John Okafor, Empress Njamah, Grace Amah, Uche Jombo
2005	Desperate Billionaire	Evelyn	Film Director Jaja Michael starring Bimbo Akintola, Rita Dominic, Kanayo O. Kanayo, Ini Edo
2005	Unknown Angel	Stella	Film Director Ernest Obi starring Ernest Obi, Emeka Eniocha, Ebubu Nwagbo, Tony Umez, Mike Ezuruonye
2005	Height of Indecision		Film Director Ernest Obi starring Amaechi Munagor, Chinyere Wilfred
2005	Baby Guards	Nonye	Film Director Ifeanyi Onyeabo starring Ashley Nwosu, Osita Iheme, Chinedu Ikedieze
2005	My Experience		Film Director Oyin starring Emeka Enyioha, Ini Edo, Susuan Patrick, Thelma Okodua
2006	Emotional Blackmail		Film Director Ernest Obi starring Zack Orji, Tony Umez, Mike Ezuruonye, Ini Edo
2006	One Chance		Film Director Emeka Nwabueze starring Oge Okoye, Emeka Nwafor, Francis Duru, Moses Armstrong
2006	Painful World	Vivian	Film Director Willie Ajenge starring Chioma Chukwuka, Desmond Elliot, Mercy Johnson, Moses Effret
2006	Honey Desire	Vivian	Film Director Stanley William starring Florence Onuma, Ngozi Orji, Mike Ezuruonye, Monalisa Chinda
2006	Edge of Paradise	Chibuzor (2 episodes)	TV soap. Film Director Greg Odutayo starring Norbert Young, Caroline King, Akeem Rahaman
2006	Dangerous Friends		Film Director Ernest Obi starring Steph-Nora Okere, Mike Ezuruonye, Yemi Blaq, Onyeka Onwenu
2006	Nebuchadnezzar	Cynthia	Film Director Stanley William starring Emeka Eniocha, Moses Armstrong, John Okafor
2006	Dream come True	Lagbaja's Choice	Musical Video for Musician Lagbaja from the Album "Africano"
2007	Saving Sarah	Sarah	Film Director Lancelot Imasuen starring Jim Iyke, Desmond Elliot
2007	Devil's Workshop	Nkechi	Film Director Willie Ajenge starring St Obi, Stephanie Okereke
2007	Classical Fraud	Cynthia	Film Director Ifeanyi starring Dakore Egbuson, Alex Usifo, Florence Onuma, Clem Ohameze
2007	Mortal Man	Marian	Film Director Gloriana James Robert starring Mike Ezuruonye, Emeka Eniocha
2007	Sounds of Poverty	Ene	Film Director Suuny Okwori starring Monalisa Chinda, Susan Peters
2007	Super story ( Everything It Takes )	Joke	TV series. Film Director Andy Amenechi starring John Njamah, Kalu Ikeagwu, Paul Adams, Gloria Young, Gbenga Richards
2007	Twist of Fate	Vivian	Film Director Willie Ajenge starring Desmond Elliot, Mercy Johnson, Moses Effret
2007	A Night in the Philippines	Amarachi	Film Director Zeb Ejiro starring Ibinabo Fiberesima, Desmond Elliot Mary Eboka
2007	Buy Me a Rose	Rich	Film Director Ernest Obi starring Dakore Egbuson, Ramsey Nouah, Bukky Ajayi, Arinze Okonkwo
2007	Titanic Tussle	Mrs Owolabi	Film Director Andy Amenechi starring Kenneth Okonkwo, Mike Ezuruonye Nkiru Sylvanus
2008	Rose of Africa	Rich	Film Director Ernest Obi starring Mike Ezuruonye, Dakore Egbuson, Steph Nora Okere, Moses Armstrong, Ramsey Nouah
2008	Italian Deal	Lina	Film Director Ernest Obi starring Yvonne Jegede, Mike Ezuruonye, Kalu Ikeagwu, Femi Branch
2008	Ice Cold		Film Director Nnamdi Odunze starring Mike Okon, Alex Usifo, Femi Brainard, Vitalis Ndubisi
2008	Divine Partner	Doctor	Film Director Yinka starring Oge Okoye, Tony Umez, Benedict Johnson
2008	Final Tussle	Mrs Owolabi	Film Director Andy Amenechi starring Desmond Elliot, Eurcharia Anunobi, Kenneth Oknokwo, Mike Ezuruonye
2009	Empty Coffin	Lilian	Film Director Emeka Hills starring Zack Orji, Emeka Ike
2009	Be Yourself		Film Director Emeka Nwabueze starring Amechi Munagor, Moses Effret
2009	My Mum And I	Lilian Wright	TV series. Film Director Greg Odutayo starring Gbenga Windapo, Taiwo Atigogo. *5 Golden Nymph Nominations at the 2010 Monte Carlo Television Festival. *10 Nominations at The 2010 Terracotta TV and Film Awards
2010	Hot Island	Lucy	Film Director Emeka Jonathan starring Emeka Ike, Monalisa chinda
2010	Wise In-Law	Stella	Film Director Ikechukwu Onyeka. starring Majid Michel, Charles Inojie, Ngozi Ezeonu, Hafiz Ayetoro
2010	A Private Storm	Lisa	Film Director Lancelot Odua Imasuen starring Ramsey Nouah, Omotola Jalade Ekeinde, John Duello
2013	Vagary	Xter	Film Director Ejiro Starring: Okey Uzoeshi
2013	This House Is Not For Sale	Esther	Film for TV Director Pat Imobio Starring: Saheed Balogun.
2014	Hear Word	Sister Esther	Stage Director Ifeoma Fafunwa Starring: Dakore Akande, Joke Silva, Ireti Doyle, Bimbo Akintola, Elvina Ibru, Omonor Shomolu
2014	Kin	-	Film Director Pat Imobio Starring Saheed Balogun, Tina Mba
2015	Okoro: The Prince	Queen Idia	Film Director Charles Uwagbai Starring: Alex Usifo, Sam Loco Efe, Edosa Imasuen, Henry Legemah.
2015	Hear Word	Sister Esther, Women Rally, VVF	Stage Director Ifeoma Fafunwa Starring Kate Henshaw, Kemi Akindoju, Joke Silva, Bimbo Akintola, Elvina Ibru. * The play also went on tour in November for Ake Festival in Ogun state and in Lagos on Christmas Day.
2015	Merciful	Mercy	Film Director Zeb Ejiro Starring Emmanuel Mensah
2016	Duplicity	Zeinom Cameron-Cole Meinom Cameron-Cole	TV series Director George Kura Starring: Sadiq Daba, Ireti Doyle, Femi Branch, Anthony Monjaro, Uru Eke, Uti Nwanchukwu, Funnybone Chibunna, Buchi Franklin, Aisha Shaba
2016	Hear Word	Sister Esther, VVF, Women Rally Leader	Stage Director Ifeoma Fafunwa Starring: Joke Silva, Bimbo Akintola, Elvina Ibru, *Local Show; Abuja. *International Premier and tour; Harvard, Connecticut and Amsterdam.
2016	Wives on Strike	Mama Amina	Film Director Omoni Oboli Starring: Omoni Oboli, Uche Jombo, Chioma Chukwuka, Julius Agwu, Kenneth Okonkwo
2016	This Thing Called Marriage	Ifeyinwa	TV series Director Blessing Effiom Egbe Starring: Femi Jacobs, Tana Adelana, Jennifer John.
2016	Okafor’s Law	Ify	Film Director Omoni Oboli Starring: Omoni Oboli, Richard Mofe Damijo, Blossom Chukwujekwu, Toyin Aimakhu, Halima Abubakar, Mary Lazarus, Yvonne Jegede, Gabriel Afolayan, Ken Erics, Betty Irabo Tina Mba *City to city official selection at the Toronto International Film Festival
2017	The Women	Omoh	Film Director Blessing Effiom Egbe starring Kate Henshaw, Omoni Oboli, Katherine Obiang, Tony Monjaro
2017	Christmas is Coming	Henri	Film Director Ufuoma McDermott starring Deyemi Okanlawon, Chioma Chukwuka
2017	Wives on Strike: The Revolution	Mama Amina	Film Director Omoni Oboli starring Omoni Oboli, Uche Jombo, Chioma Chukwuka, Julius Agwu, Kenneth Okonkwo
2018	Esohe	Eno	Film Director Charles Uwagbai Starring: Jimmy Jean-Louis, Kyle Colton, Desmond Elliot
2018	What Just Happened	Professor Oghogho	Film Director Charles Uwagbai Starring: Toyin Abraham, Mike Ezuruonye, Segun Arinze
2019	Merry Men 2	Zara	Directed by Moses Inwang Starring: Iretiola Doyle, Ayo Makun, Ramsey Nouah
2020	Love Bane	Laura	Directed by Richards Omos-Iboyi
2021	Superstar	Muna	Directed by Akay Ilozobhie
2021	Mimi		
2022	The Blood Covenant	Inspector Gasarah	Directed by Fiyin Gambo
2023	Onyeegwu	Teacher	Directed by Jerome Weber
	Merry Men 3		
2024	Wives on Strike: The Uprising		Directed by Omoni Oboli
