= What Just Happened (2018 film) =

2018 Nigerian comedy

- Theatrical release poster
- Directed by: Charles Uwagbai
- Written by: Ufuoma McDermott; Victor Mobuogwu
- Produced by: Ufuoma McDermott
- Starring: Ufuoma McDermott; Toyin Abraham; Mike Ezuruonye; Mc Abbey; Jude Orhorha; Stanley Funnybone Chibunna; Hafiz Oyetoro; Segun Arinze
- Edited by: Jude Legemah; Raphael Aruma
- Music by: Timothy Tiodi Ogundele; Hybreed (Soundtrack)
- Production company: The USM Company
- Release date: 14 September 2018
- Running time: 96 minutes
- Country: Nigeria
- Language: English

What Just Happened is a 2018 Nigerian comedy film directed by Charles Uwagbai and starring Ufuoma McDermott, Afeez Oyetoro, Segun Arinze, Toyin Abraham, Mike Ezuruonye and comedians Mc Abbey and Funny Bone. The film was written and produced by Ufuoma McDermott. The film was predominantly shot in Lagos State and Los Angeles.

== Plot ==
A disgruntled professor Oghogho (Ufuoma McDermott) decides to return home from the US and take up a visiting lecturer position at the University of Ibadan, Oyo state as suggested by her brother Efe (Segun Arinze) after she decides that she's tired of the US and cannot "get" a man over there.

Reality check is hindered by her overtly superior attitude. Upset by the driver Baba Oti (Afeez Oyetoro) and his cough, she decides to make the drive herself from Lagos to Ibadan. The would be one hour journey turns into a day of total madness and commotion as her life is miserable.

She gets help from a good Samaritan, Dele Lawson (Mike Ezuruonye) who then joins her on the journey to Ibadan. They get robbed, arrested, lost in a village and are finally helped by Leke (Jude Orhorha). They get into more trouble when Oghogho refuses to acknowledge and respect the tradition of Leke's village.

The entire film is a story within a story, as Professor Oghogho is recounting the entire encounter as a testimony in a church, and due to time constraints, the attempt to speed up her testimony leads to more commotion.

== Cast ==
- Ufuoma McDermott as Oghogho
- Omoni Oboli
- Toyin Abraham
- Mike Ezuruonye as Dele Lawson
- Mc Abbey as Pastor
- Jude Orhorha as Leke
- Stanley Funnybone Chibunna
- Hafiz Oyetoro as Baba Oti
- Segun Arinze as Efe

== Production and release ==
Sequel to the successful cinematic run of her debut movie production Christmas is Coming in 2017, Ufuoma McDermott's sophomore movie production was released in cinemas across Nigeria on 14 September 2018. Principal photography had begun in June 2015 in Lagos and Los Angeles, while Ufuoma was pregnant. After the birth of her child on August 8, 2015, production continued in 2016 and post production was concluded in mid 2018.

== Critical reception ==
Vanguard singled out actress Ufuoma Mcdermott's debut comedic performance for praise, stating "...after seeing ‘What just happened’, my eyes were opened to something new about her; mostly to her dynamism not just as a person, but as an actress too", however noting that "...her role in the film could have been a comic flop without the presence of one of the most admired talents to ever grace the Nigerian film industry, Toyin Abraham."

== See also ==
- List of Nigerian films of 2018
