= The Uprising: Wives on Strike 3 =

2024 Nigerian film

- Directed by: Omoni Oboli
- Produced by: Omoni Oboli; Tomi Adeoye
- Starring: Hilda Dokubo; Omoni Oboli; Bukunmi Adeaga-Ilori; Femi Branch; Chioma Chukwuka Akpotha; Okey Bakassi; Uche Jombo
- Music by: Unique Oliver
- Distributed by: Nile Entertainment
- Release date: 18 October 2024
- Country: Nigeria

The Uprising: Wives on Strike 3 is a 2024 Nigerian film directed and co-produced by Omoni Oboli. It is a sequel to Wives on Strike: The Revolution and Wives on Strike. The film stars Omoni Oboli, Chioma Chukwuka, Uche Jombo, Ufuoma McDermott, and Hilda Dokubo.

The Uprising: Wives on Strike 3 was released in Nigerian cinemas on October 18, 2024, and it became the highest ticket pre-sale for a Nollywood film, earning over ₦10 million through voucher sales within two days of release. Oboli, while reflecting on the journey to returning the Wives on Strike franchise, stated that this is the best of the franchise, and it will also act as a standalone, as viewers do not have to watch Wives on Strike and Wives on Strike: The Revolution to understand the third installment.

== Synopsis ==
The Uprising: Wives on Strike 3 tells the story of Ebiere, a meat seller at the women's market. Her son, who just graduated with honours, was kidnapped, the seemingly gentle and easygoing woman soon embarks on a dangerous mission to save her kidnapped son, putting herself in more harm.

== Selected cast ==
- Hilda Dokubo as Ebiere
- Omoni Oboli as Mama Ngozi
- Bukunmi Adeaga-Ilori
- Femi Branch
- Chioma Chukwuka Akpotha
- Okey Bakassi
- Uche Jombo
- Ufuoma McDermott
- May Yul-Edochie
- Tomiwa Tegbe
- Folaremi Agunbiade
- Segun Arinze
- Sani Danja
- Elvina Ibru
- Kalu Ikeagwu

== Production and release ==
Following the release of The Uprising: Wives on Strike 3 in cinemas on October 18, 2024, the film topped the West African Box Office becoming the highest-performing film in the region at the time. Brooks Eti-Inyene of Pulse Nigeria described the film as portraying the message that women can indeed be agents of societal change.
