= Family on Fire =

- Directed by: Tade Ogidan
- Written by: Tade Ogidan
- Produced by: Tade Ogidan
- Starring: Saheed Balogun; Segun Arinze; Sola Fosudo
- Production company: OGD Pictures
- Distributed by: OGD Pictures
- Release date: 2012
- Running time: 145 minutes
- Country: Nigeria
- Languages: Yoruba and subtitled in English

Family on Fire is a 2011 Nigerian film produced and directed by Tade Ogidan. It stars Saheed Balogun, Segun Arinze, Sola Fosudo and Sola Sobowale. The film premiered on 4 November 2011 at The Lighthouse Hall, Camberwell Road, London, and on 9 April 2012 at the All Seasons Plaza in Ikeja, Lagos.

== Plot ==
A young man, Kunle commits a grievous act that leaves his family members in anguish. In Lagos, Kunle hides cocaine in his mother's baggage before she pays a visit to his siblings, including the eldest brother Femi in London. His mother narrowly escapes from the British immigration officers. A rescheduled flight to the UK foils Kunle's plans to retrieve the illegal drug. Before his arrival, Femi's wife accidentally sees it while unpacking the food items stuffed along with the drug. A student in London, Moyo who is sponsored by Femi, gets remunerated by the drug dealers after stealing it from where it is hidden, but the enraged drug barons, led by the Don and his gang, unleash terror on Kunle's family. Suspense fills the air when nobody makes any attempt to find Moyo at his school since he is assumed to be in danger. Contrary to their expectations, he is on a celebration spree in London before his inevitable arrest.

== Cast ==
- Saheed Balogun
- Segun Arinze
- Sola Fosudo
- Sola Sobowale
- Bukky Amos
- Lanre Hassan

== Premiere ==
Family on Fire premiered on 4 November 2011, at The Lighthouse Hall, Camberwell Road, London. Attendees included actors Kunle Afolayan, Richard Mofe-Damijo, Ramsey Nouah, Teju Babyface, Saheed Balogun, Segun Arinze, and Bimbo Akintola. The film also premiered in Lagos State, Nigeria, on 9 April 2012 at the All Seasons Plaza. Notable attendees included Femi Adebayo, Desmond Elliot, and Yemi Shodimu, as well as Molade Okoya-Thomas, Abimbola Fashola, and Oladipo Diya, a retired lieutenant general and former chief of defence staff.

== Accolades ==
The film received two nominations at the 8th Africa Movie Academy Awards held on 22 April 2012, at the Expo Centre, Eko Hotel and Suites in Lagos, Nigeria. It was nominated for Best Nigerian Film and Best Film in an African Language. Both awards were won by Adesuwa and State of Violence respectively.
