= Mimi (2021 Nigerian film) =

2021 Nigerian romantic comedy film by Samuel Olatunji

- Directed by: Samuel Olatunji
- Written by: Joy Isi Bewaji
- Produced by: Wale Osagie; Edward Dickson
- Starring: Toyin Abraham; Ireti Doyle; Bimbo Akintola
- Production companies: 007 Global; AUL Media Studios; SBG Film Production
- Release date: 14 May 2021
- Country: Nigeria
- Language: English

Mimi is a 2021 Nigerian romantic comedy film written and directed by Samuel Olatunji. The film stars Ireti Doyle, Toyin Abraham, Bimbo Akintola in the lead roles. It became the first Nollywood film to hold its premiere at a beach when it was premiered at the Wave Beach in Elegushi on 13 May 2021. The film was released theatrically on 14 May 2021.

== Synopsis ==
Mimi, the daughter of a millionaire, discovers that her rich parents are not her biological parents and realises that her biological parents live in poverty and sold her to raise funds to manage the cost of living. Her adoptive parents made arrangements for Mimi to spend a two-week vacation with her biological parents.

== Cast ==
- Bianca Ugowanne as Mimi
- Ireti Doyle
- Toyin Abraham
- Prince Jide Kosoko
- Deyemi Okanlawon
- Olaniyi Afonja
- Afeez Oyetoro
- Bimbo Akintola
- Lateef Adedimeji
- Stephanie Isuma
- Omotunde David
- Bukunmi Adeaga-Ilori
- Taiwo Adeyemi
- Timi Agbaje
- Moses Akerele
- Ali Baba
- Ufuoma McDermott
- Oluwatosin Ogunleye
- Lizzy Jay

== Production ==
The film project marked the second collaboration between director Samuel Olatunji and CEO of AUL Media Studios, Edward Dickinson after Dear Affy. It also marked the third collaboration between 007 Global, AUL Media Studios and SBG Film Production after Street Kid and Dear Affy.

== Release ==
The film was initially touted for release on 25 December 2020, coinciding with Christmas, but was postponed due to the COVID-19 pandemic. The film had its special premiere during the Movie and Music Concert at the Wave Beach in Lagos on 13 May 2021, a day before the scheduled theatrical release. The film was released on 14 May 2021 and was screened in over 60 cinemas nationwide.
