= Stigma (2013 film) =

- Directed by: Diminas Dagogo
- Screenplay by: Okechukwu Victor Eze; Vincent Bura Bari Nwilo
- Produced by: Rivers State Ministry of Health; 13Fatman Int'l Limited
- Starring: Jackie Appiah; Hilda Dokubo; Emeka Ike; Clem Ohameze
- Edited by: Siem Nkula and Eileen De Klerk
- Production company: 13Fatman Films
- Release date: 1 December 2013
- Running time: 96 minutes
- Country: Nigeria

Stigma is a 2013 Nigerian drama film based on the discrimination faced by persons living with HIV virus in a village in Rivers State. It was directed by Diminas Dagogo and stars Jackie Appiah, Hilda Dokubo and Emeka Ike. The film was produced by Rivers State Ministry of Health.

== Plot ==
Ibiso (Hilda Dokubo) is responsible for delivery of babies in her community. She is married to an alcoholic and womanizer, Smart (Soibifa Dokubo). Ibiso's daughter, Vanessa (Jackie Appiah) continues to refuse the advances of Ebiye (Daniel Braid) towards her because she doesn't want to make the marital mistakes of her mother. Ebiye continues to woo Vanessa, sharing his allowances with her, with the hope that she will reciprocate his care towards her one day. Due to her mum's persistent failing health, A youth corper, Dr. Jide (Emeka Ike) advises Vanessa to bring her mum to the clinic after the herbal medicine administered by the traditional doctor proved ineffective. Ebiye perceives his relationship with Vanessa is at risk due to her closeness to Dr. Jide.

At the clinic, a counselling session on HIV is held with Vanessa before the test. It was later revealed to her that her mum was infected with the AIDS virus. She recollects how her mum used same equipment for different pregnant women for years. As Ibiso's health worsens, Counselor Edet (Francis Duru) reveals that the HIV virus was left untreated for years hence the complications to her health. Ibiso died shortly afterwards. Dr. Jide travels to Port Harcourt after the completion of his service year. Vanessa is also revealed to have contacted HIV after a blood contact with an infected equipment used by her Ibiso.

As the news of the presence of HIV in Ibiso's family spreads across the village, there is a wide level of discrimination against Vanessa and her two siblings. Ebiye break ties with Vanessa. Unable to withstand the stigmatization, Vanessa attempts to commit suicide by hanging. But was unsuccessful after the rope got torn. Dr. Jide and Counselor Edet makes provision to meet Vanessa in Port Harcourt. In Port Harcourt, Vanessa is introduced to Pastor Jude (Clem Ohameze) by Dr. Jide, who also registers her in an interactive social group for people living with AIDS. Vanessa wins a United Nations writing award for people living with HIV. Dr. Jide asks Vanessa to marry him. On the wedding day, it is revealed that Ebiye was actually the groom. After some reluctance, Vanessa later agreed to forgive and marry Ebiye.

== Cast ==
- Jackie Appiah as Vanessa
- Hilda Dokubo as Ibiso
- Emeka Ike as Dr. Jide
- Soibifa Dokubo as Smart
- Ngozi Nwosu as Telema
- Francis Duru as Counselor Edet
- Clem Ohameze as Pastor Jude
- Daniel Braid as Ebiye

== Release ==
It was released on 1 December 2013 in Port Harcourt to commemorate the World Aids Day in Rivers State.

== Reception ==
360nobs.com in its extensive review highlighted the positives from an HIV-related movie after Goodbye Tomorrow (1995), Yet Another Day, Visa to Hell, Dark Moment and Inside Story. It went further to state that the film was a reminder that though the prevalence of HIV/AIDS is on the decline, the disease is still with us.

== Awards ==
| Award | Category | Recipient | Result |
|---|---|---|---|
| 2015 Best of Nollywood Awards | Best Lead Actress | Hilda Dokubo | Nominated |
| 2015 Best of Nollywood Awards | Best Screenplay | | Nominated |
| 2015 Best of Nollywood Awards | Best Production Design | | Nominated |
| 2015 Best of Nollywood Awards | Best Use of Nigerian costume | | Nominated |
| 2015 Best of Nollywood Awards | Best Use of indigenous Nigerian language | | Won |
| 2015 Best of Nollywood Awards | Movie of the Year | | Nominated |
| 2015 Golden Icons Academy Movie Awards | Best Motion Picture | | Nominated |
| 2015 Golden Icons Academy Movie Awards | Best Film (drama) | | Nominated |
| 2015 Golden Icons Academy Movie Awards | Best Actress | Jackie Appiah | Nominated |
| 2015 Golden Icons Academy Movie Awards | Best Screenplay | | Nominated |
