= Diminas Dagogo =

- Citizenship: Nigeria
- Education: University of Port Harcourt
- Occupation: film director
- Notable work: Stigma

Diminas Dagogo is a film director from Rivers State, Nigeria best known for his makeup and special effects work on Nollywood films. He has received two AMVCA nominations for his work on Stigma (2013), which starred Hilda Dokubo.

Dagogo is an alumnus of the University of Port Harcourt and lives currently in Berlin/Germany.

== Selected filmography ==
- Bottle Neck (1996)
- Shame (1996)
- Ritual (1997)
- Oracle (1998)
- Wake of Death (2004)
- Son of Man (2006)
- Stigma (2013)
- Asawana (2016)
- Accidental Affair (2019)
- Amina (2021)

== See also ==
- List of Nigerian film directors
