= Sani Musa Danja =

Nigerian film actor

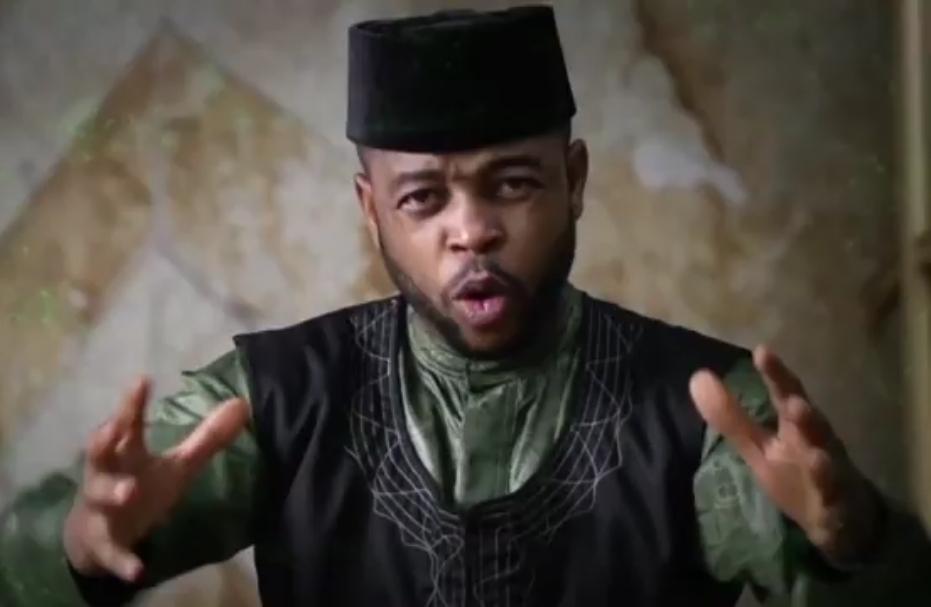
- Born: 20 April 1973 (age 52); Fagge, Kano, Nigeria
- Occupations: Film Actor, producer, director, singer, dancer
- Spouse: Mansura Isah (ex)
- Children: 4

Sani Musa Abdullahi, known as Sani Danja or Danja (born 20 April 1973), is a Nigerian film actor, producer, director, singer, and dancer. He participates in both Kannywood and Nollywood. In April 2018 he was turbaned by the Etsu Nupe, Yahaya Abubaka, as Zakin Arewa. He has featured in numerous Nollywood blockbusters including Battle on Buka Street and Wives on Strike.

== Career ==
He ventured into the Hausa movie scene in 1999 in Dalibai (student). Danja also produced and directed films, including Manakisa, Kwarya tabi Kwarya, Jaheed, Nagari, Wasiyya, Harsashi, Gidauniya, Daham, Jarida, Matashiya, and others. He made his 2012 Nollywood debut in Daughter of the River.

== Filmography ==
Sani Musa Danja has acted, produced and directed in Kannywood and Nollywood movies. Amongst them are:

Film title	Year	Name in the movie
Ganga	2000	Sani Musa Danja
Sakace	2005	Sani Musa Danja
Maslan	2005	Sani Musa Danja
Aure na mutumcina	2006	Sani Musa Danja
Dare da wawa	2006	Sani Musa Danja
Sabon shafi	2008	Auwalu
Ni' ima	2008	Sani Musa Danja
Mu rike amana	2008	Sani Musa Danja
Muruci	2008	Sani Musa Danja
Kamaruz zaman	2009	Sani Musa Danja
Yar agadez	2011	
Hadhafi	2011	Sani Musa Danja
A Cuci Maza	2013	
Blue Flames	2013	
Albashi (The salary)	2002	
Bani Adam	2012	
Budurwa	2010	
Da Kai zan Gana	2013	
"Duhun Daji"	2013	
Daga Allah ne (Is from the God)	2015	
Once Upon a Time	2015	
Newman Street	2014–2015	Usman
Dark Closet	2015	
Daham	2005	
Dan Magori	2014	
The Kiss of Death	2024	Father
Miss PJ	2024	Inspector Garba
Duniyar nan	2014	
Onyeegwu	2023	Coach kazeem
Fitattu	2013	
Gani Gaka	2012	
Gwanaye	2003	
Hanyar Kano	2014	
Idemili	2014	Ojiofor
Allura Cikin Ruwa	2024	Hadi Makama
Kukan Zaki (The lion's cry)	2010	
The other side	2016	
Buri uku a duniya (Three wishes in the world)	2016	
Kowa Dalin	2016	
Wives on Strike: The Revolution	2017	
Zahra	2017	
Kawayen Amarya	2018	
Kawayen Amarya	2018	Kalifa
iBelieve	2018	Danladi
Fantastic Numbers	2018	
In Love and Ashes	2018	Nuhu
Coming from Insanity	2019	
Gold Statue	2019	Jato
Ana Barin Halak	2019	
Akeelah	2019	Sani
Nimbe: The Movie	2019	Abu
Kawaye	2019	
Omo Ghetto: The Saga	2020	
Amina	2021	
Online	2021	
The Garbage School	2021	as Sani Musa Danja
Fanan	2021	Alhaji Sammani
Charlie Charlie	2021	Alhaji Umar as Sani Musa Danja
Badamasi	2021	Portrait of a General
Almajiri	2022	
Ba Ni (Mud Clan	2022	
Battle on Buka Street	2022	Kareem
réBIRTH	2022	
Wedding in Nigeria	2022	
Aisha	2022	
Invaders	2022	
Onyeegwu	2023	

== Discography ==
- Basu Iyawa ft. Terry G

== See also ==
- List of Nigerian actors
- List of Nigerian film producers
- List of Nigerian film directors
- List of Kannywood actors
