= Sola Fosudo =

Film actor and scholar

- Born: March 18, 1958 (age 68)
- Citizenship: Nigerian
- Education: University of Ibadan; Obafemi Awolowo University
- Occupations: Actor; dramatist; scholar

Sola Fosudo (born 1958) is a prolific Nigerian dramatist, scholar, critic, film actor, and director.

== Early life and career ==
Sola hails from Lagos State. He was trained as a dramatist at Obafemi Awolowo University and the University of Ibadan, where he obtained a Master of Arts degree in drama. He has featured and directed several Nigerian films. He is the head of the Department of Theatre Art, Lagos State University, and the university's director of information.

== Selected filmography ==
- True Confession (1995)
- Glamour Girls I (1994)
- Rituals (1997)
- Karashika (1998)
- Full Moon (1998) as P.J.
- Wasted Years (2000)
- Elastic Limit (2000) as Edison
- Grace to Grass (2001) as Pastor Wilson
- Douglas My Love (2004) as Jibunoh
- Political Control (2006)
- Strange Ordeal
- Iyawo the Alhaji
- Atelewo Eda (2008)
- So Wrong So Wright (2009-2016 TV Series) as Preye Wright
- Oga Olopa (2010)
- Family on Fire (2011)
- The Arbitration (2016) as Tomisin Bucknor
- Forbidden - TV Series (2018-2019) as Gbenga Braithwaite
- AMCOP: Clandestine (2019) as Mr. Davis
- In Ibadan (2021) as Prof Olasupo
- Praise Party (2023)
