= As Crazy as It Gets =

2015 Nigerian romantic comedy road film

As Crazy as it Gets
- Film poster
- Directed by: Shittu Taiwo
- Written by: Daniella Ame Esua; Shittu Taiwo
- Produced by: Omar Kona
- Starring: Omoni Oboli; Chuks Chyke
- Cinematography: Shalom Chiki; Uyi Enabulele
- Edited by: Justin Thomas; Shittu Taiwo
- Production company: Reel Pixel Entertainment
- Release date: 3 May 2015 (Abuja premiere)
- Country: Nigeria
- Language: English

As Crazy as it Gets is a 2015 Nigerian romantic comedy road film directed by Shittu Taiwo and starring Omoni Oboli and Chuks Chyke in lead roles.

The synopsis of the film states: "A man who is about to propose to his girlfriend has his plans thrown away when a heavily pregnant woman shows up on his doorstep demanding that he takes care of his responsibilities".

== Cast ==
- Omoni Oboli as Katherine
- Chucks Chyke as Ritchie
- Aisha Tisham as Nina
- Oduen Apel as
- Titi Joseph as
- Mary Chukwu as
- Tehilla Adiele as
- Ajibade as

== Production and release ==
As Crazy as it Gets was shot in Abuja, FCT. It premiered at the Sheraton Hotel, Abuja on 3 May 2015. The trailer for the film was released online in June 2015.

== Reception ==
Nollywood Reinvented rated the film 40%, commending the story for being "different", but criticizing the weak plot and the lack of chemistry between the two lead characters. It concluded: "...the movie is interesting in that it is different. Omoni brings a lot of life to the movie and the male lead, Chucks Chyke, does very well individually as an actor. Now there is definitely work that needs to be done with his responses to the other actors in the frame".
