= Diamond Ring (1998 film) =

- Directed by: Tade Ogidan
- Written by: Tade Ogidan
- Screenplay by: Tade Ogidan
- Produced by: Tade Ogidan
- Starring: Bukky Ajayi; Bimbo Akintola; Tunji Bamishigbin; Liz Benson; Richard Mofe-Damijo
- Production companies: O.J. Productions; OGD Pictures
- Release date: 1998
- Running time: 96 minutes
- Country: Nigeria
- Language: English Language

Diamond Ring is a 1998 Nollywood thriller film directed by Tade Ogidan. It stars Richard Mofe-Damijo, Bimbo Akintola, Liz Benson, Susan Cave, Kunle Dada, Roland Henshaw, David Kennedy, Gbadewonuola Oyelakin, Teju Babyface, Sola Sobowale and Bukky Ajayi. The film was released in two parts.

== Plot ==
Diamond Ring follows the story of a conflict between the spirit of Mrs. Gladys and members of Chidi's cult group, XG. In a bid to display his fitness for a life in the secret cult, Chidi, a freshman in the university and the only child of his parents; Chief and Mrs. Ijeoma Dike steals a diamond ring from Mrs. Gladys’ corpse. The spirit of Mrs. Gladys in turn haunts Chidi and his friends. The members of the cult begin to die successively. Chidi is struck by a peculiar sickness which cannot be treated by orthodox medicine. The journey to find his healing culminates in the return of the diamond ring to Mrs. Gladys’ corpse.

== Cast ==
- Bukky Ajayi
- Richard Mofe-Damijo
- Bimbo Akintola
- Liz Benson
- Sola Sobowale
- Teju Babyface
- Kunle Dada
- Susan Cave
- Roland Henshaw
- David Kennedy
- Gbadewonuola Oyelakin

== Production and release ==
Diamond Ring was described as one of the few well-crafted and produced Nollywood films of its time.
