= Anchor Baby (film) =

2010 film directed by Lonzo Nzekwe

- Theatrical poster
- Directed by: Lonzo Nzekwe
- Written by: Lonzo Nzekwe
- Produced by: Lonzo Nzekwe; Jeremy Hood
- Starring: Omoni Oboli; Sam Sarpong; Terri Oliver
- Cinematography: Ricardo Diaz; C.S.C.
- Edited by: Matthew Johnson; Lonzo Nzekwe
- Music by: Sean Baillie
- Production company: Alpha Galore Films
- Distributed by: Alpha Galore Inc.
- Release dates: 10 December 2010 (Nigeria); 27 January 2011 (US)
- Running time: 95 minutes
- Countries: Nigeria; Canada
- Language: English
- Budget: ₦30 million
- Box office: ₦18,000,000 (domestic gross)

Anchor Baby is a Nigerian thriller drama film written, directed and produced by Lonzo Nzekwe and starring Omoni Oboli, Sam Sarpong and Terri Oliver. At the 2010 Harlem International Film Festival in New York, the film won the award for Best Film and Omoni Oboli, the protagonist of the film, was awarded the Best Actress award. The film received two nominations at the 7th Africa Movie Academy Awards.

== Plot ==
A married Nigerian couple, Joyce and Paul Unanga, living illegally in the United States, has been ordered to leave the country by U.S. immigration. They decide that they will leave, but only after Joyce, who is five months pregnant, delivers her baby in the United States to guarantee automatic U.S. citizenship for their child. Thus, ignoring the deportation order, the couple goes into hiding. When Paul is caught and deported, leaving Joyce to fend for herself, she struggles on her own to survive. Bureaucracy keeps getting in the way of Joyce achieving her goal and just as she is about to give up hope, she meets Susan, a married freelance writer who offers to help in the form of safe, free accommodation until the baby is born. With the help of her newfound friend, Joyce sets out to make the 'American Dream' come true for her unborn child.

== Cast ==
- Omoni Oboli as Joyce Unanga
- Sam Sarpong as Paul Unanga
- Terri Oliver as Susan Backley
- Santiago Lopera as Joey
- Mark Cassius as Attorney John
- Steve Rankine as Landlord
- Colin Paradine as Tim
- Rachael Ancheril as ICE Agent Labinsky
- Carl Bauer as Immigration Escort
- Cyrus Faird as Rosario

== See also ==
- List of Nigerian films of 2010
