= Olaniyi Afonja =

Nigerian comedian, actor and producer (born 1974)

- Born: Olaniyi Mikail Afonja; 14 October 1974 (age 51); Oyo State, Nigeria
- Other name: Sanyeri opakan
- Citizenship: Nigerian
- Education: Durbar Grammar School
- Occupations: Actor, Comedian
- Years active: 1992- till date
- Spouse: Hawawu Omolara Afonja (m. 2013)
- Children: 2

Olaniyi Mukaila Afonja (born 14 October 1974), well known as Sanyeri, is a Nigerian comedian, actor and film maker.

== Early life and education ==
Born in Bola Area of Oyo town in Oyo State as the first child of his parents, Olaniyi had his formal education at St. Michael Primary School, Òkè-èbó, Oyo State and Durbar Grammar School, Oyo Town, Oyo State where he finished his secondary school education.

== Career ==
Olaniyi's acting career started in 1992, after joining a theatre group introduced to him by a friend. In 1996, Olaniyi relocated to Lagos State to further his career and has since starred in several Yoruba films.

== Filmography ==
- Idera (2022) as Baba Ige
- Blackout (2021) as Ekong
- Esin (2021) as Ayanda
- Jenifa (2008) as Adio Onikoko
- Omo University (2015) as Yaya
- Apesin (2006) as Ogboni
- Omo mi (2006) as Asogba
- Esin (2021) as Ayanda
- Osan ja (2013) as Salisu
- Black Day (2018) as Mufu
- Ise Imole (2009) as Sanyeri
- Alakada 2 (2013) as Conductor
- The Cock-Tale (2020) as Lakunle
- Queen Lateefat (2021) as Adekanbi
- Mimi (2021)

== Personal life ==
Olaniyi is married to Omolara Afonja with whom he has two children.

== Awards and nominations ==
Year	Award ceremony	Prize	Result	Ref
2014	Yoruba Movie Academy Awards	Best Comedy Actor	Nominated	
2015	2015 City People Entertainment Awards	Best Movie Producer of The Year (Yoruba)	Nominated	
2015	2015 City People Entertainment Awards	Comic Actor of The Year (Yoruba)	Nominated	

== See also ==
- List of Yoruba people
