= Gold Statue =

2019 Nigerian comedy adventure drama film by Tade Ogidan

- Film poster
- Directed by: Tade Ogidan
- Screenplay by: Tade Ogidan
- Story by: Tade Ogidan
- Produced by: Tade Ogidan
- Starring: Gabriel Afolayan; Kunle Remi; Richard Mofe Damijo
- Production company: OGD Pictures
- Release date: 17 May 2019
- Running time: 145 minutes
- Country: Nigeria
- Language: English

Gold Statue is a 2019 Nigerian comedy adventure drama film produced, written and directed by Tade Ogidan. It stars Gabriel Afolayan and Kunle Remi in the lead roles. The film was released on 17 May 2019 and received positive reviews from critics. It was also nominated for the Africa Movie Academy Award for Best Nigerian Film in 2019. The film also received some awards at film festivals.

== Synopsis ==
Two young men, Wale and Chike are in search of a treasure of "Gold Statue" which is believed to have been a deity inherited by their generation. They witness and go through a series of unimaginable unprecedented and unexpected ordeal when attempting to locate where the supposed Gold Statue is located. Eventually, they get the statue and become rich.

== Cast ==
- Gabriel Afolayan as Wale
- Kunle Remi as Chike
- Richard Mofe Damijo as Mr. Esho
- Sola Sobowale as Grace
- Kelvin Ikeduba as Bryan
- Olakunle Fawole as Banjul
- Norbert Young as Antar
- Alibaba Akpobome as Mr. Manuel
- Segun Arinze as Zonal Commander
- Rykardo Agbor as Capone
- Greg 'Teddy Bear' Ojefua as Rambo

== Production ==
Tade Ogidan, filmmaker and CEO of OGD Pictures, returned to the film industry after an eight-year hiatus with this project. He revealed that Gold Statue was originally written in 1991 but could not be produced at the time due to financial constraints. The film also marked the first onscreen appearance of actors Richard Mofe-Damijo and Sola Sobowale as a couple in 21 years.

== Awards and nominations ==
Year	Award	Category	Result	Ref
2019	Best of Nollywood Awards	Best Actor in a Lead role – English	Won	
2019	Best of Nollywood Awards	Best Supporting Actor –English	Nominated	
2019	Best of Nollywood Awards	Movie with the Best Sound	Won	
2019	Best of Nollywood Awards	Movie with the Best Screenplay	Nominated	
2019	Best of Nollywood Awards	Movie with the Best Editing	Nominated	
2019	Best of Nollywood Awards	Movie with the Best Cinematography	Nominated	
2019	Best of Nollywood Awards	Best Use of Nigerian Costume in a Movie	Nominated	
2019	Best of Nollywood Awards	Best Use of Make up in a Movie	Won	
2019	Best of Nollywood Awards	Movie of the Year	Won	
2019	Best of Nollywood Awards	Director of the Year	Won	
2019	Best of Nollywood Awards	Movie with the Best Production Design	Won	
