= Wings of a Dove (film) =

2019 Nigerian film

- Directed by: Omoni Oboli
- Produced by: Omoni Oboli
- Starring: Zack Orji, Omoni Oboli, Sani Danja
- Release date: February 8, 2019
- Country: Nigeria
- Language: English

Wings of a Dove is a 2019 Nigerian film produced and directed by Omoni Oboli. The movie expresses dissatisfaction over girl-child marriage and encourages the need to educate our females. The film stars Zack Orji, Omoni Oboli, Sani Danja, Yakubu Mohammed, Amal Umar, and Martha Felix.

== Synopsis ==
The movie revolves around two young northern girls who were forcefully married in their teenage. However, all they needed was a free childhood experience.

== Cast ==
- Zack Orji
- Sani Danja
- Yakubu Mohammed
- Omoni Oboli
- Amal Umar
- Martha Felix
