= Omoni Oboli =

Nigerian actress (born 1978)

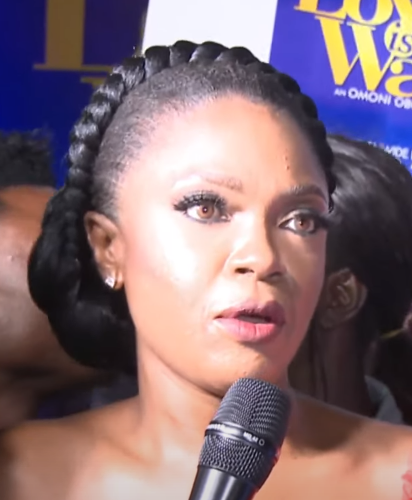
- Oboli at the premiere of Love Is War
- Born: 22 April 1978 (age 48); Benin City, Edo, Nigeria
- Education: Bachelor of Art in Foreign Languages
- Alma mater: University of Benin
- Occupations: Actress, scriptwriter, director, producer
- Years active: 1996 — present
- Known for: Wives on Strike film series; The Figurine; Anchor Baby
- Spouse: Nnamdi Oboli (m. 2000)
- Children: 3

Omoni Oboli (born 22 April 1978) is a Nigerian actress, scriptwriter, film director and producer. She studied at the New York Film Academy and has written several screenplays, including The Figurine (2009), Anchor Baby (2010), Fatal Imagination, Being Mrs Elliott, The First Lady and Wives on Strike (2016). In 2018, she starred in and directed the comedy film Moms at War.

== Early life and education ==
Oboli was born in Benin City, Edo State. She is a descendant of Mosogar, a small village in Delta State. Oboli completed her primary and secondary education in Benin City and later earned a Bachelor of Arts in French (Second Class Upper Division) from the University of Benin. After completing her degree, Oboli attended a four-week digital editing workshop at the New York Film Academy.

== Career ==
Oboli began her film career in Bitter Encounter (1996), where she played a secretary. Her next film role was in Shame. She played the lead roles in Not My Will, Destined To Die, and Another Campus Tale. After a brief early career in 1996, Oboli left the film industry to complete her university education. She got married immediately after school and returned to the industry a decade later in 2009, where she began producing her own films.

Oboli has several screenplays to her credit, including Wives On Strike as well as The Rivals, a film she co-produced with her friend that won Best International Drama at the New York International Independent Film & Video Festival. It was the first Nigerian film to premiere at the festival since its inception in 2003. The film received 3/4 stars from the festival's judges. Oboli has played lead roles in films, including The Figurine (2009), Anchor Baby (2010), Being Mrs Elliott, and Fifty (2015). In 2010, she became the first actress from Nollywood to win Best Actress at two international festivals, not organized by Nigerians or Africans. She received the accolades at the Harlem International Film Festival and the Los Angeles Movie Awards for her role in Anchor Baby.

== Awards and nominations ==
In 2010, Oboli won the award for Best Actress Narrative Feature at the Los Angeles Movie Awards and the award for Best Actress at the Harlem International Film Festival. She was nominated for the Best Actress in a Leading Role at the 2011 Africa Movie Academy Awards.

In 2014, she won the Big Screen Actress of the Year award, at the 2014 ELOY Awards, for Being Mrs Elliott, and was nominated for Best Actress in a Leading Role (English) at the 2014 Best of Nollywood Awards for the same film.

In 2015, Oboli was awarded The Sun Nollywood Personality of the Year. She has directed films including Being Mrs Elliott, The First Lady, Wives on Strike, and Okafor's Law.

On 14 August 2017, Oboli announced on Instagram that she had become a brand ambassador of LandWey Investment Limited.

== Legal issue ==
Oboli starred in the film Okafor's Law, which premiered on 24 March 2017. However, the film could not be screened at the premiere due to a court injunction. Oboli was accused of copyright infringement by Jude Idada, who claimed to have written part of the script for Okafor's Law. The film was released on 31 March 2017.

== Charity ==
Oboli set up a charity organization, The Omoni Oboli Foundation, to support less privileged women and children in Nigeria. The foundation has carried out several projects, including feeding street children in Lagos.

== Filmography ==
Year	Film	Role	Notes
2009	Entanglement		with Desmond Elliot, Mercy Johnson, Yemi Blaq
2009	The Figurine	Mona	with Ramsey Nouah, Kunle Afolayan
2010	Bent Arrows	Lola	with Olu Jacobs, Joke Silva, Stella Damasus-Aboderin, Desmond Elliot
2010	Anchor Baby	Joyce Unanga	with Sam Sarpong
2010	Bursting Out	Ini	with Genevieve Nnaji, Desmond Elliot, Nse Ikpe-Etim, Majid Michel
2012	Feathered Dreams	Sade	with Andrew Rozhen, Philippa Peter-Kubor
2014	Brother's Keeper	Mena	with Majid Michel
2014	Render to Caesar	Alero	with Gbenga Akinnagbe
2014	Being Mrs Elliott		with Majid Michel, AY, Uru Eke
2015	Lunch Time Heroes	Governor's wife	with Dakore Akande
2015	The Duplex	Adaku	with Mike Ezuruonye
2015	As Crazy as it Gets	Katherine	
2015	The First Lady	Michelle	with Alexx Ekubo, Yvonne Jegede, Chinedu Ikedieze, Joseph Benjamin
2015	Fifty	Maria	with Ireti Doyle, Nse Ikpe Etim and Dakore Akande
2016	Wives on Strike		with Chioma Chukwuka, Uche Jombo, Kalu Ikeagwu
2016	Okafor's Law	Ejiro	with Blossom Chukwujekwu, Gabriel Afolayan, Ufuoma McDermott
2017	The Wedding Party 2		with Adesua Etomi, Banky Wellington, Chiwetalu Agu, Patience Ozokwor
2017	Wives on Strike 2	Mama Ngozi	with Chioma Chukwuka, Uche Jombo, Ufuoma McDermott, Toyin Abraham
2017	My Wife and I	Ebere Akinyere	with Ramsey Nouah
2018	Moms at War	Ebubechukwu Ubosi	and directed. Starred with Funke Akindele
2018	The Women	Teni Michaels	
2019	Sugar Rush	Mrs. Madueke	
2019	Love Is War	Hankuri Philips	with Richard Mofe-Damijo, Jide Kosoko, Akin Lewis
2019	Òlòturé	Alero	with Sharon Ooja, Omowumi Dada, Blossom Chukwujekwu,
2019	Wings of a Dove		
2021	The Other Side	Oghenz	directed by Jumoke Olatunde
2021	Clash	Nneka	with Oscar Atuma, Michelle Akanbi, Percy Anane-Dwumfour
2021	Charlie Charlie		
2024	Òlòtūré: The Journey	Alero	TV series 3 episodes
2024	The Uprising: Wives on Strike 3	Madam Ngozi	
2025	Love In Every Word		with Uzor Arukwe, Bambam, Osereme Inegbenebor, Daniel Rocky, Thelma Nwosu, Amanda Iriekpen, Susan Jimah

== Awards and nominations ==
Year	Award ceremony	Category	Film	Result	Ref
2011	Africa Movie Academy Awards	Best Actress in a Leading Role	Anchor Baby	Nominated	
2017	Best of Nollywood Awards	Best Supporting Actress –English	The Women	Won	

== See also ==
- List of Nigerian actors
- List of Nigerian film producers
