= Okafor's Law =

2016 Nigerian romantic comedy drama film

- Theatrical release poster
- Directed by: Omoni Oboli
- Written by: Omoni Oboli
- Produced by: Omoni Oboli
- Starring: Blossom Chukwujekwu; Omoni Oboli; Toyin Aimakhu; Gabriel Afolayan; Ufuoma McDermott; Richard Mofe Damijo; Tina Mba; Kemi Lala Akindoju; Ken Erics
- Cinematography: Yinka Edward
- Music by: Kulanen Ikyo
- Production company: Dioni Visions
- Distributed by: FilmOne Distributions
- Release dates: 12 September 2016 (TIFF); 31 March 2017 (Nigeria)
- Running time: 110 minutes
- Country: Nigeria
- Language: English
- Budget: ₦40 million

Okafor's Law is a 2016 Nigerian romantic comedy drama film written, directed, and produced by Omoni Oboli. The film stars Blossom Chukwujekwu, Omoni Oboli, Toyin Aimakhu, Gabriel Afolayan, Ufuoma McDermott, Richard Mofe Damijo, Tina Mba, Kemi Lala Akindoju and Ken Erics.

== Plot ==
The film goes against the view that straight men and women can't just be friends. It brings this true by telling the story of Chucks (Blossom Chukwujekwu) nicknamed by his friends as the Terminator, an ardent player with ladies, whose quest to proveng this law to his friends brings him three women he must re-seduce: Ify (Ufuoma McDermott), Tomi (Toyin Aimakhu) and Ejiro (Omoni Oboli), whose lives have drastically changed. And this must be done within 21 days. This challenge of their various new statesus makes his quest to win the bet more and more insurmountable as he tries to prove the immortality of the lo-g age law: Okafor's Law.

== Cast ==
- Toyin Aimakhu as Tomi Tijani
- Omoni Oboli as Ejiro
- Ken Erics as Baptist
- Ufuoma McDermott as Ify Omene
- Richard Mofe Damijo as Mr. Onome
- Blossom Chukwujekwu as Chuks Okafor (a.k.a. Terminator)
- Gabriel Afolayan as Fox
- Tina Mba as Mom
- Kemi Lala Akindoju as Onome
- Mary Lazarus as Kamsi
- Halima Abubakar as Cassandra
- Yvonne Jegede as Toyin
- Tomi Adeoye as Receptionist
- Olu Adedeji as Kalu
- Henry Ani as Kabir
- Luke Ekpah as Tayo

== Production ==
The film was shot at locations in Ikorodu, Lagos State.

== Release ==
The film was first released on 12 September 2016 at Toronto International Film Festival, Canada. It was scheduled to be screened on 10 November 2016 at the Stockholm International Film Festival, Sweden and later in April 2017, Nigeria.

== Controversy ==
Upon the film's release at the 2016 Toronto International Film Festival, it was accused of Intellectual property theft by Jude Idada, a writer, who claimed to be the owner of the film's story; he also claimed to have written part of the script; all without appropriate credit or remuneration. On 24 March 2017, during the premiere of the film, a court injunction was delivered, which prevented the film from being screened at the event, and also from any future screenings. However, the injunction was lifted in court on 30 March 2017, due to the lack of enough evidence to justify a suspension of the film's release. The film was allowed to open in theatres on 31 March, as originally scheduled, pending the conclusion of the court proceedings. Furthermore, it is being suggested that part of the box office earnings for Okafor's Law might be up for damages, if the court should rule in favour of Idada.
