= Dangerous Twins =

2004 Nigerian Drama film

- Dangerous Twins Poster
- Directed by: Tade Ogidan
- Written by: Tade Ogidan
- Produced by: Tade Ogidan
- Starring: Ramsey Nouah; Stella Damasus-Aboderin; Bimbo Akintola
- Production company: OGD Pictures
- Release date: 2004
- Running time: 135 minutes
- Country: Nigeria
- Language: English

Dangerous Twins is a 2004 Nigerian drama film written, produced and directed by Tade Ogidan. The film, which stars Bimbo Akintola, Ramsey Nouah and Stella Damasus-Aboderin is a 135 minutes, three-part film that won the 1st Africa Movie Academy Awards for Best Special Effects.

Ramsey Nouah played a dual role, as Taiye and Kenny in the film.

== Plot summary ==
The film narrates the story of identical twins, Taiye and Kehinde. Kehinde is based in Lagos with his wife and his three children, while Taiye is based in London. The agony of a marriage without children, after several years frustrates Taiye, who convinces Kehinde to trade places with him in order to impregnate his wife. However, more problems result. Kehinde betrays his twin brother's trust and violence follows.

== Production ==
The film was produced in Nigeria by OGD Pictures Production but shot in a foreign context in multiple locations, including Nigeria, London, France, Switzerland, the Netherlands, Belgium and United States of America.

== Cast ==
- Ramsey Nouah as Taiye / Kehinde
- Stella Damasus-Aboderin
- Bimbo Akintola
- Sola Asedeko
- Nobert Young
- Sola Sobowale
- Anna Fiertag as Marsha
- Danielle Moubarak as Judy
- Lanre Balogun
- Obiageli Molube
- Charles Ukpong
- Jason Welsh as Immigration Officer
