= The First Lady (film) =

- Directed by: Omoni Oboli
- Written by: Omoni Oboli
- Produced by: Nnamdi Oboli
- Starring: Chinedu Ikedieze; Joseph Benjamin; Alex Ekubo
- Cinematography: John Demps
- Edited by: Steve Sodiya
- Music by: Micheal Ogunlade
- Production company: Dioni Visions Entertainment
- Distributed by: DA Studios
- Release date: 2015
- Running time: 107 minutes
- Country: Nigeria
- Language: English

The First Lady is a 2015 Nigerian movie produced and directed by Omoni Oboli.

== Plot ==
A prostitute, who is tired of the kind of work she does, is doing everything in her power to stop and is also looking unto a man to save her from her predicament.

== Cast ==
- Omoni Oboli as Michelle
- Chinedu Ikedieze as Small Kenechi
- Joseph Benjamin as Kenechi
- Alexx Ekubo as Obama
- Yvonne Jegede as Sandra
- Udoka Oyeka as Michael
- Anthony Monjaro as Prince
