= Stella Damasus =

Nigerian actress and singer

- Born: April 24, 1978 (age 48); Benin City, From Asaba Delta State Nigeria
- Citizenship: Nigeria
- Education: University of Lagos
- Occupations: Actress, singer
- Spouses: Jaiye Aboderin (m. 1999; died 2004) Emeka Nzeribe (m. 2007; div. 2007) Daniel Ademinokan (m. 2014; div. 2020)
- Awards: Best Actress at the Nigeria Entertainment Awards in 2007
- Website: www.stelladamasus.com

Stella Damasus // (born April 24, 1978) is a Nigerian actress and singer. She was nominated for Best Actress in a Leading Role at the Africa Movie Academy Awards in 2009. She won the Award for Best Actress at the Nigeria Entertainment Awards in 2007. In 2012, she won the award for Best Actress for the movie Two Brides and a Baby at the Golden Icons Academy Awards in Houston, Texas.

== Early life ==
Stella Damasus was born in Benin City, Edo State, in the South-South region of Nigeria. She has four sisters. She grew up in Benin City, where she completed most of her primary education.

== Personal life ==
Damasus married her first husband, Jaiye Aboderin, in 1999 when she was 21. The couple had two daughters before Jaiye died suddenly in 2004. Damasus remarried in 2007, this time to Emeka Nzeribe. The marriage lasted for seven months before they mutually agreed to divorce. In 2011, she became associated with multiple award-winning Nollywood producer and director Daniel Ademinokan; this eventually led to a separation in 2020 and a subsequent divorce. Their relationship sparked a lot of controversy because both parties never publicly admitted to being dating, engaged, or even married until 2014.

== Career ==
Damasus started her career as a singer in Lagos, where she worked as a studio session singer at the famous Klink Studios owned by filmmaker Kingsley Ogoro. There she honed her skills as a singer and went on to do vocals for top radio and TV jingles in Nigeria at that time.

Damasus is a Theatre arts graduate of the University of Lagos, Nigeria. She first appeared in the Nigerian film Abused in 1992. Her claim to fame, however, was her second movie, Breaking Point, produced by Emem Isong and directed by Francis Agu, where she shot into superstardom across Nigeria. She was nominated for the African Movie Academy Award in 2006 for "Best Actress in a Leading Role" for her performance in the movie Behind Closed Doors. In 2008, she was also nominated for the African Movie Academy Award for "Best Actress in a Leading Role" in the movie Widow and in 2009 in the movie State of the Heart. She has gone on to star in more than 70 movies. Damasus is the co-founder of I2radio and hosts two podcast shows: Undiluted with Stella Damasus and When Women Praise.

== Filmography ==
Year	Title	Role	Starring
1995	Rattlesnake	Amara	Francis Duru, Nkem Owoh, Sunny McDon, Ebele Uzochukwu Anne Njemanze
1999	Face of a Liar		Zulu Adigwe, Rita Dominic, Bibiana Ohio
2001	Rumours		Segun Arinze, Zulu Adigwe, Kunle Coker, Uche Jombo
2002	Submission		Patience Ozokwor, Zack Orji, Clem Ohameze, Jennifer Eliogu
2003	Real Love		Ramsey Nouah Jnr, Chioma Chukwuka, Olu Jacobs
2003	Passions		Emeka Ike, Richard Mofe Damijo, Genevieve Nnaji, Florence Onuma
2003	My Time 1&2		Bob Manuel Udokwu, Patience Ozokwor, Mary Ann Apollo, Ofia Afuluagu Mbaka
2003	When God says Yes	Rose	Richard Mofe Damijo, Clem Ohameze, Ngozi Ezeonu, Pete Edochie
2003	Never say goodbye	Nwando	Fabian Adibe, David Ihesie, Ramsey Nouah Jnr
2003	Market seller 1&2		Lilian Bach, Omotola Jalade Ekeinde, Kanayo O Kanayo
2003	The Intruder 1&2		Enebeli Elebuwa, Rita Dominic, Jim Iyke, RMD
2003	Emotional Pain	Titi	Eucharia Anunuobi, Richard Mofe Damijo, Frank Dallas
2003	Dangerous Desire		Fred Amata, Bimbo Akintola, Dayo Adewunmi
2003	Bad Boys		Ramsey Nouah Jnr, Clem Ohameze, Amaechi Muonagor
2003	After the Fight		Eucharia Anunuobi Ekwu, Kanayo O Kanayo
2004	Queen 1&2		Robert Peters, Richard Mofe Damijo, Nkiru Sylvanus
2004	Missing Angel 1,2&3	Dolly	Desmond Elliot, Empress Njamah, Nobert Young, Tuvi James
2004	Kings Pride		Richard Mofe Damijo, Fred Aresoma, Peter Bruno
2004	Engagement Night 1&2		Richard Mofe Damijo, Darlene Benson-Cobham
2004	Above Love		Desmond Elliot, Bukky Wright, Enebeli Elebuwa
2004	Betrayed by Love		Emeka Ike
2004	Red Hot		Liz Benson, Zack Orji, Segun Arinze
2004	Burning Desire 1&2		Richard Mofe Damijo, Enebeli Elebuwa, Ernest Asuzu
2004	Cinderella		Desmond Elliot, Grace Amah, Segun Arinze
2004	Dangerous Twins 1, 2 & 3		Ramsey Nouah Jnr, Bimbo Akintola, Lanre Balogun, Sola Sobowale
2005	Wheel of Change		Fred Amata, Rita Dominic, Mbong Odungide
2005	The Seed 1&2		Emeka Enyiocha, Chidi Mokeme, Ashley Nwosu
2005	Desperate and Dangerous		Chidi Mokeme, Steph-Nora Okereke
2005	Real Love 2&3		Ramsey Nouah Jnr, Caroline Ekanem, Olu Jacobs
2005	Games Women Play 1&2	Emma	Genevieve Nnaji, Omotola Jalade Ekeinde, Desmond Elliot, Bob Manuel Udokwu, Zack Orji
2005	The Bridesmaid	Tega	Richard Mofe Damijo, Kate Henshaw Nuttal, Chioma Chukwuka
2005	Behind Closed Doors 1&2		Desmond Elliot, Richard Mofe Damijo, Patience Ozokwor
2005	Widow		Yemi Solade, Peter Bruno
2006	Standing Alone	Lilian	Richard Mofe Damijo, Tony Umez, Jennifer Eliogu
2008	Yankee Girls	Tessy	Omotola Jalade-Ekeinde, Rita Dominic
2008	Yankee Girls 2	Tessy	Omotola Jalade-Ekeinde, Rita Dominic
2008	Four sisters	Harmony	Pete Edochie, Uche Ogbodo, Obi Okoli, Adaora Ukoh
2008	Halimat		
2010	Bent Arrows	Ngozi	Zainab Ademola, Ibrahim Adam
2011	Two brides and a baby	Ama	with Kalu Ikeagwu
2014	To Rise Again	Lydia	with Segun Arinze, Chuks China, Peter Bunor
2014	When Is It Enough		Short (as actor, co-producer and co-writer with Daniel Ademinokan)
2016	Affairs of the Heart	Vivienne	Also starring Beverly Naya, Divine Shaw, Stephanie Stephen, Glenn Turner, Joel Rogers, Monica Swaida and Cyceru Ash.
2018	Between	Chelsea Hollis	Travis Grenier, Tatiana Lia Zapperdino, Isabel De La Cruz
2021	Gone	Ngozi	Sam Dede, Gabriel Afolayan, Bimbo Manuel, Bimbo Ademoye
2021	Akwụna	Ebere	Nnamdi Kanaga, Tim Meadows
2022	Stay	Mrs. B	Joseph Benjamin, Nini Amerlise, Theo Bray
2022	Akwuna	Ebere	Nnamdi Kanaga, Sara Rashelle, Kelechi Eke
2023	The Scar	Zara	Joseph Benjamin, Mercy Macjoe, Collins John Emefiele, Ella Emefiele
2025	To Kill a Monkey	Nosa	William Benson, Bimbo Akintola, Bucci Franklin

== See also ==
- List of Nigerian actors
