= Wives on Strike: The Revolution =

2018 Nigerian film

Wives On Strike: The Revolution
- Directed by: Omoni Oboli
- Produced by: Omoni Oboli
- Starring: Omoni Oboli; Uche Jombo; Chioma Chukwuka Akpotha; Odunlade Adekola; Toyin Abraham
- Release date: 2018
- Country: Nigeria
- Language: English

Wives On Strike: The Revolution is a 2018 Nigerian film. It is the sequel to Omoni Oboli's Wives on Strike produced in 2016. The film was written, produced, and directed by Omoni Oboli and was released in cinemas on December 29, 2018. The film serves as a metaphor for the damaging repercussions of domestic violence and the degree to which it has permeated society.

== Plot ==
The film continues with the story of the market women from the prequel, Wives on Strike, who are now battling against domestic abuse after one of them is killed by her husband, which prompts another strike by the women against their husbands. With their rallying call; "want some sex?", then speak up against domestic violence, the women were able to force the hands of their husbands to stand up for what is right and curb domestic violence.

== Cast ==
- Omoni Oboli as Mama Ngozi
- Uche Jombo as Madam 12:30
- Chioma Chukwuka Akpotha as Madam Vera
- Odunalade Adekola as Prince
- Toyin Abraham as Iya Bola
- Sola Sobowale as Iya'loja
- Ufuoma McDermott as Mama Amina
- Kenneth Okonkwo as Papa Ngozi
- Chioma "Chigul" Omeruah as Iyawo Prince
- Julius Agwu as Calistus
- Elvina Ibru as Shaka
- Sani Musa Danja as Baba Amina
