= To Kill a Monkey =

Nigerian television series

- Genre: Crime thriller
- Created by: Kemi Adetiba
- Screenplay by: Kemi Adetiba
- Directed by: Kemi Adetiba
- Starring: William Benson; Bucci Franklin; Stella Damasus
- Country of origin: Nigeria
- Original language: English
- No. of series: 1
- No. of episodes: 8

Production
- Producers: Kemi Adetiba; Remi Adetiba
- Production company: Kemi Adetiba Visuals

Original release
- Network: Netflix

To Kill a Monkey is a 2025 Nigerian crime thriller television series written, produced and directed by Kemi Adetiba. It stars William Benson, Bucci Franklin, Stella Damasus, Bimbo Akintola, Michael O. Ejoor, Chidi Mokeme, Teniola Aladese, Lilian Afegbai, and Sunshine Rosman. The series was released on Netflix on 18 July 2025.

== Premise ==
Efemini, a desperate programmer in dire circumstances, becomes a reluctant fraudster when he is enticed into cybercrime by an old friend who is a Lagos cybercrime kingpin. As he is pulled into a deadly web of deceit, trauma and survival, his morals are questioned, and ultimately compromised.

== Cast ==
- William Benson as Efemini "Efe" Edewor
- Bucci Franklin as Obozhuiomwen "Oboz" Ogbemudia
- Stella Damasus as Nosa
- Bimbo Akintola as Inspector Mo Ogunlesi
- Michael O. Ejoor as Inspector Onome
- Chidi Mokeme as Teacher
- Lilian Afegbai as Idia
- Sunshine Rosman as Amanda Sparkles
- Teniola Aladese as Ivie

== Episodes ==
No.	Title	Directed by	Written by	Original release date
1	"In the beginning..."	Kemi Adetiba	Kemi Adetiba	July 18, 2025
2	"Hand of Friendship"	Kemi Adetiba	Kemi Adetiba	July 18, 2025
3	"Four Years Later"	Kemi Adetiba	Kemi Adetiba	July 18, 2025
4	"Pay Your Tax"	Kemi Adetiba	Kemi Adetiba	July 18, 2025
5	"House of Cards"	Kemi Adetiba	Kemi Adetiba	July 18, 2025
6	"Pour Petrol on Fire"	Kemi Adetiba	Kemi Adetiba	July 18, 2025
7	"A Chilling Ultimatum"	Kemi Adetiba	Kemi Adetiba	July 18, 2025
8	"Who Wins at the End?"	Kemi Adetiba	Kemi Adetiba	July 18, 2025

== Production ==
The eight-part series was written, produced and directed by Kemi Adetiba, who also served as showrunner. It was co-produced by Remi Adetiba under the Kemi Adetiba Visuals banner. Principal photography began in 2023.

== Release ==
The series was released on Netflix on 18 July 2025.
