= Silent Night (1996 film) =

- Directed by: Chico Ejiro
- Written by: Zeb Ejiro and Ogenejabor.
- Release date: 1996
- Country: Nigeria
- Language: English language

Silent Night is a 1996 Nigerian crime action film directed by Chico Ejiro and written by Zeb Ejiro and Ogenejabor. It stars Ramsey Nouah, Segun Arinze, Kate Henshaw, Alex Usifo and Joke Silva. The film follows the exploits of a robbery gang formed by people from different backgrounds.

== Plot ==
Stanley, who is from a wealthy family, joined a robbery gang out of boredom. Upon his recruitment as a member of Black Arrow's gang, he takes part in a robbery operation. When his family home was accidentally raided, he was forced to kill his own brother, Vincent, who recognised him. Ruth, the sister of the gang's leader, is in a relationship with Stanley, which results in her pregnancy. Nemesis caught up with Black Arrow's gang and they were arrested and sentenced to death by firing squad.

== Cast ==
- Lola Adewuyi as Ufuoma Odame
- Jerry Ajakaye as taxi driver
- Segun Arinze as Arrow
- Ramsey Nouah as Stanley
- Peter Bunor as chief judge
- Matilda Dakoru as uncle's wife
- Johnson Davidson as Adams
- Taiwo Ebikeme as police
- Emmanuel France as teacher
- Alex Usifo as case judge and Stanley's father
- Joke Silva as Stanley's mother and wife of case judge
- Kate Henshaw as Ruth
