= Mansura Isah =

Nigerian Kannywood actress, video editor, producer, and director

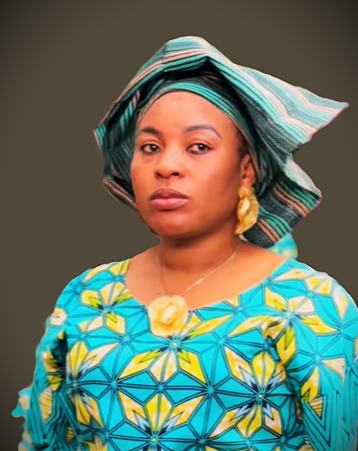
- Born: Mansura Isah; February 25, 1985 (age 41); Kano, Kano
- Citizenship: Nigerian
- Occupations: Actress, Producer, Director, Philanthropist
- Years active: 1999-present
- Spouse: Sani Musa Danja (ex)
- Children: 4
- Relatives: Maryam Isah (Sister)

Mansura Isah is a Nigerian film actress and producer working in the Hausa film industry popularly known as Kannywood. She was born on February 25, 1985, in Kano State, Nigeria. She began her acting career in the late 1990s and is regarded as the first female video editor in the Hausa cinema industry. She married Sani Musa Danja, a Nigerian singer and actor. They were later divorced.

== Filmography ==
- Jodha (2025/2026)
- 'Yan Mata (2010)
- Gurnani
- Jarumai (2004)
- Zazzaɓi (2005)

== Early life and education ==
Mansura Isah was born in Anguwar Gama Kasuwar Takari, Kano State, to the family of Alhaji Isah Naira da Kobo. For her secondary school, she went to Federal College of Education (FCE) Kano Staff School, where she sat for both the National Examinations Council (NECO) and the West African Examinations Council (WAEC). Later on, she gained admission into Bayero University Kano (BUK), but moved to complete her degree at the University of Abuja where she lived with her husband.

== Career ==
Mansura Isah started her career as a Kannywood female producer before going into acting in the late 1990s. Mansura has featured in films like Yan Mata, Gurnani, Jurumai, Zazzabi, Turaka and others. She made her directorial debut in 2025 with Jodha, a film that touches on social issues like H.I.V. awareness and early marriage.

In January 2026, a scene of her directorial debut Jodha was recommended to be cut out by the officials of Kano Censorship Board after she submitted the final cut to the board, as expected of every Kannywood filmmaker before their movie is released.

== Charity initiative ==
She is the founder and Chief executive officer (CEO) of Today Life Foundation which she uses to help the less privileged by paying their medical bills in addition to assisting them during Ramadan.

== Personal life ==
In 2007, Mansura quit acting to marry Sani Musa Danja who is also an actor. Their marriage produced four children, Khadijatul Iman, Khalifa Sani, Yakubu and Yusuf, but ended in May 2021.

In June 2024, Mansura married her second husband, but divorced him after he stole a 4 billion naira contract from her.
