= Sam Sarpong =

British-born American actor, model and musician (1974–2015)

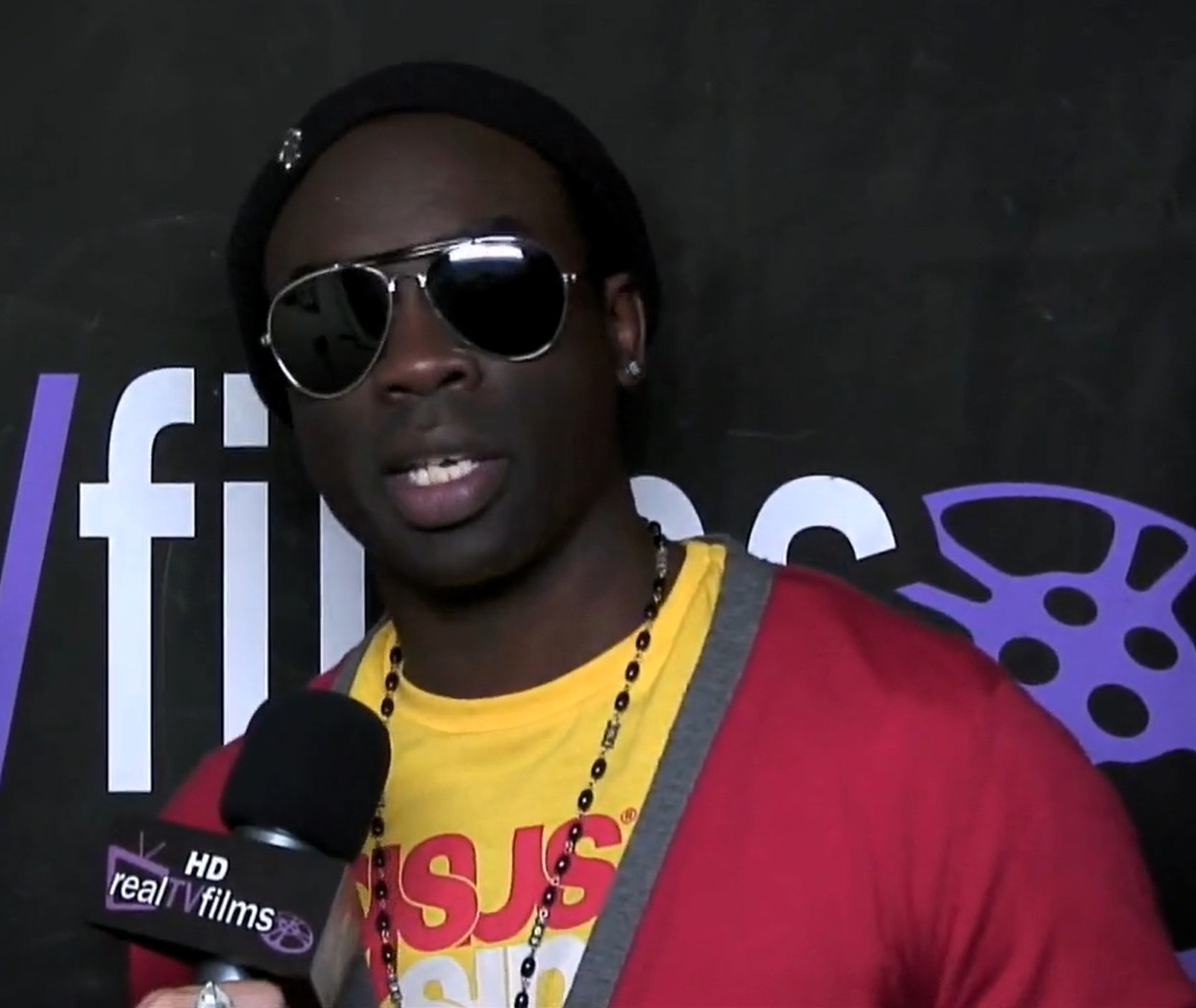
- Sarpong in 2009
- Born: Samuel Osei Sarpong Jr. 19 December 1974; London, England
- Died: 26 October 2015 (aged 40); Pasadena, California, U.S.
- Occupations: Actor; model; musician
- Years active: 1994–2015
- Relatives: June Sarpong (sister)

Samuel Osei Sarpong Jr. (19 December 1974 – 26 October 2015) was a British-born American actor, model, and musician. He performed in over sixty feature films and fifty-five television shows, including such films as Carmen The Hip Hopera, Love Don't Cost a Thing, Keeping Up with the Steins, Anchor Baby and No Weapons, for which he won best lead actor at the San Diego Black Film Festival. He was also the host on MTV's Yo Momma for three seasons. He was one of the first black male models for designer Tommy Hilfiger and was the face of the brand for over six years.

== Personal life and death ==
Sam Sarpong was born in London and moved to Los Angeles with his father, Sam Sarpong Sr., who is a native of Ghana, when he was 11 years old. He attended El Camino Real High School in Woodland Hills, California, where he was a basketball star. When his father moved to Pasadena, Sarpong lived with a friend's family so he could continue attending El Camino Real. When his aspirations for a college and professional basketball career proved unsuccessful, he turned to acting and modelling.

Sarpong died on 26 October 2015 at the age of 40 after jumping from the Colorado Street Bridge in Pasadena, California. His death was ruled a suicide by the Los Angeles County Department of Medical Examiner-Coroner, pending an autopsy.

== Career ==
Sarpong was a co-host of MTV's show Yo Momma, and had since gone on to serve as the host of the BET Awards pre-show All Access, for seven years. At the 2013 BET Awards, he presented the "Best International Artist" category.

Sarpong starred as Paul Unanga in the film Anchor Baby and won Best Lead Actor for this role at the 2012 New York Film Festival. He also guest-starred in "Lord of the Bling", an episode of Veronica Mars.

Sarpong was a fashion editorial magazine campaign for the brand Louis Vuitton, a recipient of the MAA Fashion Award for Male Model of the Year, and twice named by Today's Black Woman magazine on their "Fifty Most Beautiful People" list. He was added to Us Weekly′s "Hot 100 Young Hollywood with Style" list in 2007.

Sarpong was featured in modelling campaigns for the brand Boy London, and in the past served as the international face of the Nelson Mandela Foundation clothing line.

He posthumously appeared in the seventh episode of American Crime Story playing Byron/Neighbor Man No. 1.

== Selected filmography ==
- Sunset Park (1996) – Washington Heights Basketball Player (uncredited)
- No Easy Way (1996) – Gee (uncredited)
- Carnival of Wolves (1996) – Gang member #3
- All's Fair in Love & War (1997)
- Mr. Show with Bob and David (1997-1998) – Professor Murder
- American History X (1998) – Jail Inmate (uncredited)
- Hash Brown's (1999) – Gangster
- Touch (2000)
- Chasing Sunsets (2001) – Terrance
- King Rikki (2002) – Louis
- Masked and Anonymous (2003) – Blunt
- Swirl (2003) – Max (uncredited)
- Love Don't Cost a Thing (2003) – Kadeem
- Everybody Hates Chris (2005, TV Series) – Mario ("Everybody Hates Babysitters")
- Johnny Was (2006) – Skip
- Keeping Up with the Steins (2006) – Terrence Smythe
- Grad Night (2006) – Jerrod Elliott
- Nailed (2006) – Scott Scott
- Marked (2007) – Marcus
- Young Cesar (2007) – Tariq
- Grindin (2007) – Morris
- Carts (2007) – Conrad
- 7-10 Split (2007) – Himself (uncredited)
- The Sweep (2008) – Chrome
- Unemployed (2008) – Big Dime
- Farm House (2008) – Jonas
- Single Black Female (2009) – Will
- The House That Jack Built (2009) – Mace
- Dedd Brothers (2009) – Sugar
- Church (2010) – Jay
- Anchor Baby (2010) – Paul Unanga
- The Preacher's Family (2011) – Deion Hines
- Trigger (2012) – Trey
- Crossed the Line (2014) – Twist
- Battered (2014) – Ray Fleming
- Tamales and Gumbo (2015)
- No Weapon Formed Against Us (2015) – Deion
