= Sola Sobowale =

Nigerian actress (born 1963)

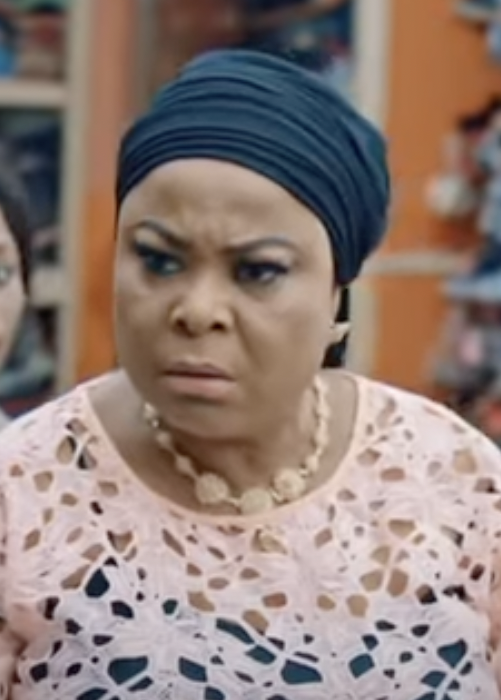
- Sobowale in 2018
- Born: 26 December 1965 (age 60); Ondo State, Nigeria
- Citizenship: Nigeria
- Occupations: screenwriter; actress; director; producer
- Years active: 1998–present
- Notable work: King of Boys . The Wedding Party
- Children: 4
- Parent(s): Joseph Olagookun, Esther Olagookun
- Awards: 2019 Africa Movie Academy Award for Best Actress in a Leading Role

Sola Sobowale (born 26 December 1965) is a Nigerian film actress, screenwriter, film director and film producer. Sola Sobowale had her big break in 2001, in the premiere of Nigeria's popular television drama series Super Story: Oh Father, Oh Daughter.

== Career ==
Before shooting into stardom, Sola Sobowale had roles in The Village Headmaster, Mirror in the Sun, and the Yoruba film, Asewo To Re Mecca. She joined acting through numerous roles in movies produced by Awada Kerikeri Group, under the leadership of Adebayo Salami. Over the years, Sobowale had scripted, co-scripted, directed and produced several Nigerian films. She scripted, produced and directed Ohun Oko Somida, a 2010 Nigerian film that stars Adebayo Salami. She featured in Dangerous Twins, a 2004 Nigerian drama film produced by Tade Ogidan, written and directed by Niji Akanni. She is also featured in Family on Fire produced and directed by Tade Ogidan.

Her role in King of Boys (2018) is one of her most notable performances till date. She played Eniola Salami, a powerful and ruthless businesswoman and politician known as "The King of Boys." The movie was a Nigerian crime political thriller film written, co-produced and directed by Kemi Adetiba, a movie that reunited Adetiba and Sola Sobowale after they worked together in Kemi Adetiba's directorial debut, The Wedding Party in 2016. She reprised her role in the sequel, The Return of the King which released on 27 August 2021 exclusively on Netflix as a 7-part limited series.

Sola Sobowale revealed on her Instagram page in July 2022, that she had been cast in her first Bollywood role for the upcoming film by film director Hamisha Daryani Ahuja.

== Personal life ==
Sola Sobowale is married and has four children. She was chosen to be the brand ambassador for Mouka mattress company's Wellbeing range.

== Awards and nominations ==
Year	Award	Category	Work	Result	Ref
2019	African Movie Academy Awards (AMAA)	Best Actress in a Leading Role	King of Boys	Nominated	
2023	Africa Magic Viewers' Choice Awards	Best Supporting Actress	Anikulapo	Nominated	

== Awards ==
In 2019, Sola Sobowale received the award for Best Actress in a Leading Role for her role in the 2018 Nigerian film: King of Boys.

== Selected filmography ==
=== Actor ===
- Asewo To Re Mecca (1992)
- Diamond Ring (1998)
- Super Story: Oh Father, Oh Daughter (2001).
- Outkast (2001).
- Ayomida (2003) as Executive Director
- Ayomida 2 (2003)
- Dangerous Twins (2004)
- Disoriented Generation (2009) as Ishmael's Aunty
- Ohun Oko Somida (2010)
- Family on Fire (2011)
- The Wedding Party (2016) as Tinuade coker
- Hustle (2016-2018) as Mama Sekinat
- Christmas Is Coming (2017) as Mrs. Atta
- The Wedding Party 2 (2017) as Tinuade Coker
- King of Boys (2018) as Eniola Salami
- Crazy People (2018) as Mrs. Gomez
- The Men's Club (2018 - 2020)
- Wives on Strike: The Revolution (2019) as Iya'loja
- Gold Statue (2019) as Mrs. Esho
- Shadow Parties (2020) as Amoke
- In Case of Incasity (2021) as Alhaja
- King of Boys: The Return of the King (2021) as Eniola Salami
- Battle on Buka Street (2022) as Asake
- Aníkúlápó (2022) as Awarun
- Shanty Town (2023)
- Ada Omo Daddy (2023) as Mrs. Ireti Balogun
- Double Dekoi (2023) as Madam Shaggy
- Postcards - Netflix series (2024)
- Beast of Two Worlds (2024) as Iya Oba
- Owambe Thieves (2025) as Madam Toke

=== Producer ===
- Ayomida (2003)
- Ayomida 2 (2003)
- Ohun Oko Somida (2010)

=== Notable work ===
- Diamond Ring
- Dangerous Twins
- The Wedding Party
- The Wedding Party 2
- Christmas is Coming
- Hustle
- King of Boys
- Gold Statue
- King of Boys 2: Return of the King

== See also ==
- List of Nigerian film producers
- List of Yoruba people
