= Chico Ejiro =

Nigerian movie director, screenwriter, and producer (died 2020)

- Born: Chico Aziakpono; Nigeria
- Died: 25 December 2020
- Occupations: Movie director, screenwriter and producer
- Spouse: Joy Ejiro
- Relatives: Zeb Ejiro - brother Peter Red Ejiro -brother

Chico Ejiro (born Chico Aziakpono; died 25 December 2020) was a Nigerian movie director, screenwriter, and producer. Little was known about Ejiro other than that he was born in Isoko, Delta, Nigeria; he originally studied agriculture; and he was drawn into video production because Nigerians would not buy blank video cassettes. His enormous body of work was typical of the second generation that started in the 1990s when cheap video-production equipment became available in the country. He owned a production company called Grand Touch Pictures, which is based in Lagos.

== Career ==
Nicknamed Mr. Prolific, he directed over 80 movies within 5 years—each one shot in as little as three days. They feature story lines relevant to Nigerians. The exact number of movies he has worked on as either director, producer, or both is unknown, but it ranges in the hundreds as of 2007. He was profiled in The New York Times, and Time magazine in 2002.

== Personal life ==
Ejiro married Joy Ejiro in 1998, and they had four children. He had two brothers: Zeb Ejiro, the best-known of the new Nigerian cinema auteurs outside of the country, and Peter Red Ejiro, also a movie producer.

He died in the early hours of Christmas Day, 25 December 2020. His son died on 15 November 2021, just nearly a year after his father’s death. According to several reports, his son had been battling cancer for years.

== Legacy ==
Ejiro was featured in the 2007 documentary Welcome to Nollywood, which followed him as he made Family Affair 1 and Family Affair 2.

== Filmography ==
- Silent Night (1996)
- Blood Money (1997)
- Night Bus to Lagos (2019)

== See also ==
- List of Nigerian film producers
- List of Nigerian film directors
