= Wives on Strike =

2016 Nigerian comedy film

- Directed by: Omoni Oboli
- Produced by: Omoni Oboli
- Starring: Uche Jombo, Chioma Akpotha, Ufuoma McDermott, and Kehinde Bankole
- Release date: April 8, 2016
- Running time: 93 minutes
- Country: Nigeria
- Languages: English, Nigerian Pidgin (Naijá)

Wives on Strike is a 2016 Nigerian film produced and directed by Omoni Oboli and starring Uche Jombo, Chioma Akpotha, Ufuoma McDermott and Kehinde Bankole. As of September 2024, the film ranks as the 46th highest grossing Nigerian film in Nigerian cinemas.

Its sequel, Wives on Strike: The Revolution was released in 2018.

In August 2024, Nile Entertainment announced that the third installment of the Wives on Strike franchise, titled Wives on Strike: The Uprising, would open in Nigerian cinemas on October 18, 2024 and in theaters across the UK, U.S., Ireland, and Canada later that month.

== Synopsis ==
The film is a satire about a group of market women who deny their husbands sex in a bid to stir them into standing up for a young girl, who was compelled by her father to marry a man against her will. The film was shot in the heat of the #ChildNotBride conversation.

== Cast ==
- Uche Jombo
- Chioma Akpotha
- Ufuoma McDermott
- Kehinde Bankole
- Kalu Ikeagwu
- Julius Agwu
- Kenneth Okonkwo
- Sola Sobowale

== Reception ==
=== Critical reception ===
Irede Abumere for Pulse praised the story and the use of the amusing approach adopted in the screenplay for addressing stern issues. Tush Magazine rated it 4/5, and applauded the imminent message and social issues raised in the film.

=== Box office ===
Upon release, the film was reported to have broken several records at the Nigerian box office.
