= Christmas Is Coming (film) =

2017 Nigerian film

- Theatrical release poster
- Directed by: Ufuoma McDermott
- Written by: Ufuoma McDermott
- Produced by: Ufuoma McDermott
- Starring: Ufuoma McDermott; Chioma Chukwuka; Zack Orji; Sola Sobowale; Deyemi Okanlawon; Mary Lazarus; Odenike Odetola; Gregory Ojefua
- Edited by: Jude Legemah
- Music by: Kolade Morakinyo
- Production company: The USM Company
- Distributed by: Silverbird Distribution Company
- Release date: 24 November 2017
- Running time: 102 minutes
- Country: Nigeria
- Language: English

Christmas Is Coming is a 2017 Nigerian romantic comedy film starring Ufuoma McDermott, Chioma Chukwuka, Deyemi Okanlawon, Zack Orji and Sola Sobowale. The film was written and directed by Ufuoma McDermott.

== Synopsis ==
Henri Atta is a tomboy who suffers a string of misadventures after undergoing a makeover by her flatmates; Avia and Nene a few days to Christmas, which also coincides with her big pitch at the office.

Henri is given a hard time during her pitch, which is further exacerbated by the antics of her colleague Lola Makinde.

The story takes a turn, when Henri unwittingly falls in love with her boss Koko Williams.

== Cast ==
- Ufuoma McDermott as Henri Atta
- Sola Sobowale as Mrs. Atta
- Chioma Akpotha as Lola Makinde
- Zack Orji as General Atta
- Deyemi Okanlawon as Koko Williams
- Mary Lazarus as Avia
- Gregory Ojefua as Mr. Esan
- Michael Okon as Harry
- Izzie Otaigbe as Izzie Otaigbe
- Odenike Odetola as sales clerk
- Amanda Oruh as Chika Eze
- Ray Adeka as Osaretin Ida

== Production and release ==
Ufuoma McDermott revealed that she began writing the story for the film in 2013, while principal photography began in early 2017 and the trailer was released on 24 October 2017. The film premiered at the Filmhouse IMAX Cinemas, Lekki on 18 November 2017, and pre-release tickets were sold, before the film was released in cinemas across Nigeria on 24 November 2017.

== Critical reception ==
Pulse Nigeria reported that actor Richard Mofe-Damijo remarked upon seeing the film "I love it! I love the movie." The general consensus on the site was that Christmas Is Coming will "get you reeling with laughter but also get you mildly tensed because of the suspense all packed up in the final scenes."

== See also ==
- List of Nigerian films of 2017
