= The Next Titan =

Nigerian reality television series

The Next Titan is an annual Nigerian business reality TV show and business plan competition that scouts ambitious business upstarts from ages 21 to 39 seeking to demonstrate their innovative business ideas. The contestants prove their commercial intelligence and business savvy to win the Grand Prize. The Next Titan entertains viewers with the show’s raw, unfiltered view into the world of business challenges and the dynamics of entrepreneurship in Nigeria The first season premiered in 2013, and the show has since become a hit among entrepreneurial reality TV shows in Nigeria, reaching its 10th season.

== Past seasons and winners ==
The series is created by Mide Akinlaja.

Season	Year	Winner	Idea	Ref.
1	2013	Iroghama Obeifun	Haircare Product Manufacturing	
2	2015	Davies Okeowo	Accounting Services	
3	2016	Marvis Marshall Idio	Recycling/Furniture	
4	2017	Kennedy Iyeh	Farming/Agriculture	
5	2018	Ogechukwu Alexis Obah	Skincare & Cosmetics	
6	2019	Amifeoluwa Yakubu	Garment Manufacturing	
7	2020	Joshua Idiong	Palm-oil Production	
8	2021	Adausu Emuobo Taiwo	Elderly Care Clinic	
9	2022	Eric Fireman	Studios & Production	
10	2025	Pearl Ubani	Cosmetics Manufacturing	

== Audition and selection process ==
=== Regional Auditions ===
The audition phase of The Next Titan Reality TV show is conducted across multiple Nigerian cities to ensure nationwide participation. Auditions are traditionally held in six major cities: Abuja, Port Harcourt, Enugu, Kano, Ibadan, and Lagos. In recent seasons, an online audition option has been added to accommodate entrepreneurs who cannot attend physical auditions. During these regional auditions, aspiring entrepreneurs present their business ideas and pitches to a panel of judges. This format allows contestants from different geographical zones to compete for limited spots in the competition. The audition process typically attracts thousands of applications from young Nigerian entrepreneurs seeking to participate in the show.

=== Bootcamp Stage ===
Following the auditions, approximately 50 entrepreneurs are selected to advance to the Bootcamp stage. The Bootcamp serves as an intensive preparatory phase where selected contestants undergo both physical and mental training. This stage is designed to equip participants with essential skills and knowledge for their entrepreneurial journey ahead. The atmosphere combines rigorous training with recreational activities, creating an environment that tests contestants' resilience and adaptability.

== The premiere of The Next Titan ==
=== Premiere Event ===
Between 18 and 20 contestants are selected from the bootcamp to enter the main competition phase, known as the Titan House. The premiere event announces these finalists and typically features representatives from sponsoring brands and business sectors.

=== Broadcasting ===
The series is broadcast on multiple Nigerian television platforms. Season 8 aired on DStv's Africa Magic channels, Wazobia Max TV, and Premium Box. Later seasons have continued on Africa Magic Showcase and Africa Magic Family. Each season runs for ten weeks.

== The Titan House ==
During the 10-week competition period, contestants residing in the Titan House participate in various business-oriented tasks and challenges on a weekly basis. These assignments cover multiple aspects of entrepreneurship, including sales, marketing, promotions, advertising pitches, philanthropy, and corporate social responsibility (CSR). The tasks are designed to test contestants' practical business acumen and decision-making skills in real-world scenarios.

Contestants receive tasks from show sponsors, participate in sponsored visits, and engage in recreational activities while learning throughout the process. The experience combines competitive business challenges with educational opportunities and team-building exercises. The cycle of task completion, boardroom evaluations, evictions, and victories continues for 10 weeks until the top 5 contestants are selected to advance to the Grand Finale, where they defend their business concepts before the final judgment.

== Titan boardroom and judges ==
The weekly Titan boardroom sessions serve as the show's evaluation and elimination segment. Contestants present their task performances before a panel of judges consisting of prominent Nigerian business personalities and industry leaders. Notable judges and mentors who have appeared on the show include:

- Kyari Bukar – Founder, Trans-Sahara Investment Corporation
- Chris Parkes – Chairman/CEO, CPMS Africa
- Tonye Cole – Founder, Sahara Group
- Lilian Olubi – CEO and Founder, Gold Lily Productions

Following each boardroom evaluation, contestants face potential weekly evictions based on their performance and the judges' assessments.

== The Grand Finale ==
The Grand Finale serves as the culminating event of each season, typically held at a prestigious hotel venue in Nigeria. The event brings together key stakeholders including government officials, show sponsors and partners, the judging panel, all 18 to 20 contestants from that season, and previous winners and contestants from past seasons. From the original cohort, five finalists present their business concepts in a final defense before the judges to compete for the grand prize.

=== Season 8: "The Uncaged" ===
The eighth season featured 18 contestants and offered a grand prize of ₦15 million. The finale included attendance by the Minister of Youth and Sports Development.

=== Season 10: "The Unconventional" ===
The tenth season, marking the show's 10th anniversary, was sponsored by Betano. Auditions were held in Abuja, Port Harcourt, Enugu, Lagos, and online. Fifty contestants advanced to bootcamp, with 20 selected for the Titan House.

The finale took place at the prestigious Lagos Marriott Hotel. Pearl Ubani, a beauty entrepreneur, won the competition and received ₦40 million in prize money reflecting the show's growth and increased investment in Nigerian entrepreneurship since its inception.

== See also ==
- American Inventor
- The Big Idea
- The Profit
- Dragon's Den
- Gulder Ultimate Search
