= Julius Agwu =

Nigerian stand-up comedian, actor and singer

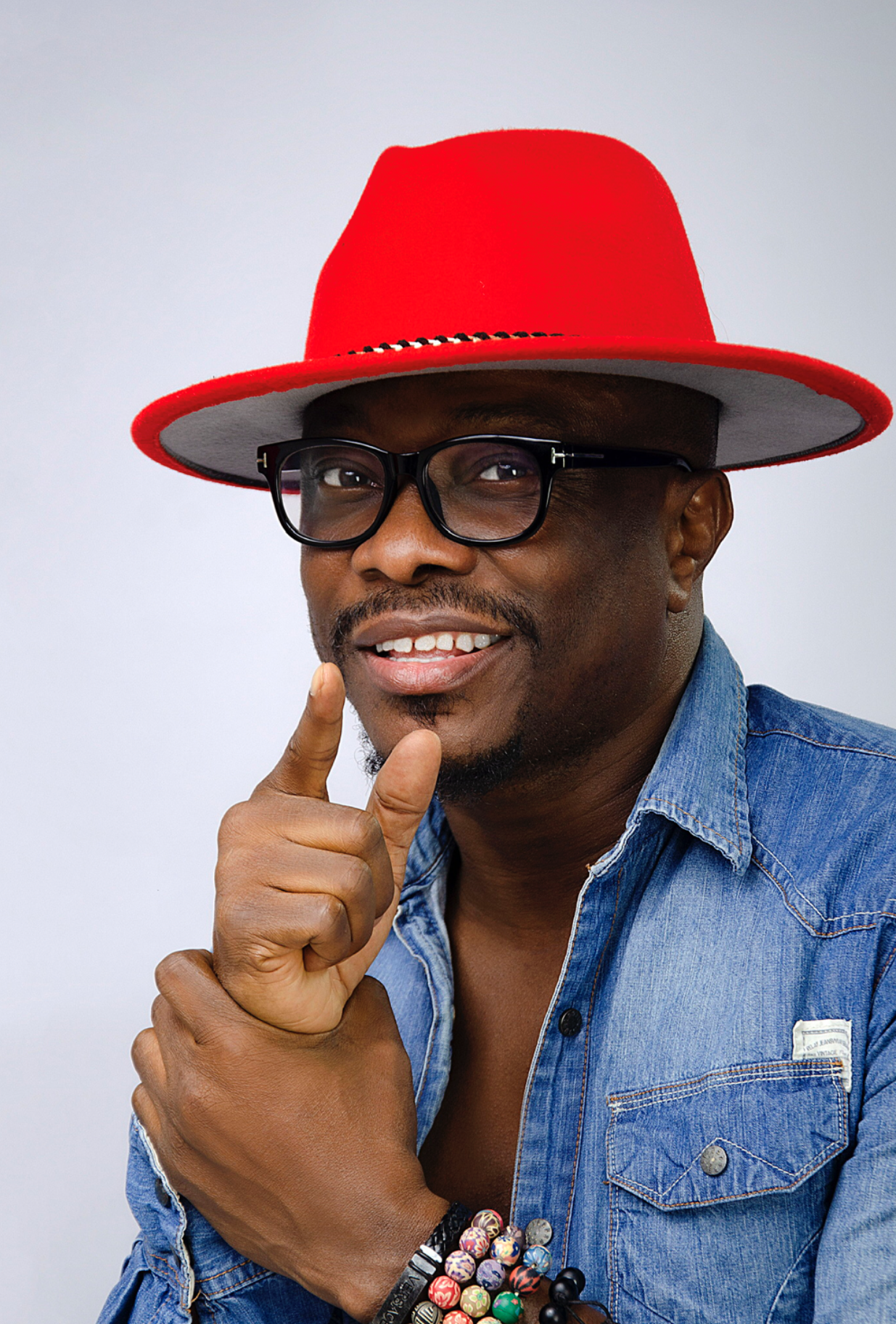
Julius Agwu in 2023

Julius Agwu (born April 7, 1973)// is a Nigerian stand-up comedian, actor, singer and MC. Julius Agwu is the MD/CEO of Reellaif Limited, a music and movie production company. He is also an entertainment consultant and motivational speaker. He is the producer behind comedy shows like Crack Ya Ribs, Laff 4 Christ's Sake, and Festival of Love.

== Early life and career ==
Born in Port-Harcourt, Rivers State, south-south region of Nigeria to Chief Augustine Amadi Agwu and Mrs. Mary Agwu, Julius is the fifth child in a family of six children. He started his acting career on stage in the city of Port-Harcourt, where he grew up. He acted in several television series and movies such as Badamasi (2021), Wives on Strike (2017), Dognapped (2017), Torn (2013), A Long Night (2014), After Count (2011), and Lagos Boys (2003).

== Education ==
Julius Agwu started his education at Elementary State School and later UBE Primary School, both in Choba, Port Harcourt, Rivers State, where he obtained his First School Leaving Certificate. After his primary school education, he proceeded to Government Secondary School in Borokiri, Port Harcourt, Rivers State, Nigeria, and later completed his secondary school education at Akpor Grammar School in Ozuoba, Port Harcourt, Rivers State, obtaining his West African Senior School Certificate in the process.

While he was in Akpor Grammar School in Ozuoba, he was the Social Prefect and President of the Dramatic, Debating, and Cultural Society. Upon the completion of his secondary school education, he later studied theater arts at the diploma level from the University of Port Harcourt with a specialization in acting and followed suit with a degree programme (BA) in directing in the same institution.

== Filmography ==
- Rattlesnake (1995)
- A Long Night (2015)
- Wives on Strike (2016)
- Wives On Strike: The Revolution (2017)
