= Bukky Ajayi =

Nigerian actress

- Bukky Ajayi in a movie
- Born: 2 February 1934
- Died: 6 July 2016 (aged 82); Surulere, Lagos State, Nigeria
- Other name: Zainab Bukky Ajayi
- Occupation: Actress
- Years active: 1966–2014

Zainab Bukky Ajayi (2 February 1934 – 6 July 2016) was a Nigerian actress.

== Life and career ==
Bukky Ajayi was born and raised in Nigeria but completed her higher education in England, United Kingdom with the support of a federal government scholarship. In 1965, she left England for Nigeria, where her career began as a presenter and newscaster for Nigerian Television Authority in 1966. Ajayi made her film debut in the television series Village Headmaster during the '70s before she went on to feature in Checkmate, a Nigeria television series that aired in the early 1990s.

During her acting career, she featured in several films and television series, including Critical Assignment, Diamond Ring, and Witches among others. In 2016, her contributions to the Nigerian film industry were recognized after she and Sadiq Daba were awarded the Industry Merit Award at the 2016 Africa Magic Viewers Choice Awards.

== Filmography ==
Film
Year	Film	Role	Notes
2017	Hakkunde	Mama	Comedy / Drama
2013	Mother of George	as Ma Ayo Balogun	directed by Andrew Dosunmu
2011	Eti Keta	Mama Sherifat	
2010	The Child	Imade	
2009	Bolode O'ku	Ayoola's Mother	—
2009	Òréré Layé	—	—
2008	Amoye	—	—
2008	Iya Mi Tooto	—	—
2007	A Brighter Sun	—	featured in all parts
2007	Big Heart Treasure	Mama James	featured in all parts
2007	Fine Things	—	featured in all parts
2007	Keep My Will	Ego	featured in all parts
2006	Women of Faith	Eunice	featured in all parts
2005	Bridge-Stone	Mama Polina	featured in all parts
2005	Destiny's Challenge	—	—
2005	Women's Cot	—	featured in all parts
2004	Indecent Girl	as Mrs. Orji	featured in all parts
2004	Little Angel	—	—
2004	Obirin Sowanu	—	—
2004	Temi Ni, Ti E Ko	—	featured in all series
2004	Worst Marriage	Agnes	featured in all series
2003	The Kingmaker	—	—
2003	My Best Friend	—	—
2001	Saving Alero	—	—
2001	Thunderbolt	Mama Tutu	—
2000	Final Whistle	Mrs. Morgan	featured in all series
2000	Oduduwa	—	featured in all series
1998	Diamond Ring	—	—
1998	Witches	as Desmond's mother	—
1997	Hostages	—	—
1991–1994	Checkmate	—	—
—	Village Headmaster	—	—

== Death ==
Ajayi died at her residence in Surulere, Lagos State on 6 July 2016 at the age of 82.
