= Hilda Dokubo =

Nigerian film actress and youth advocate

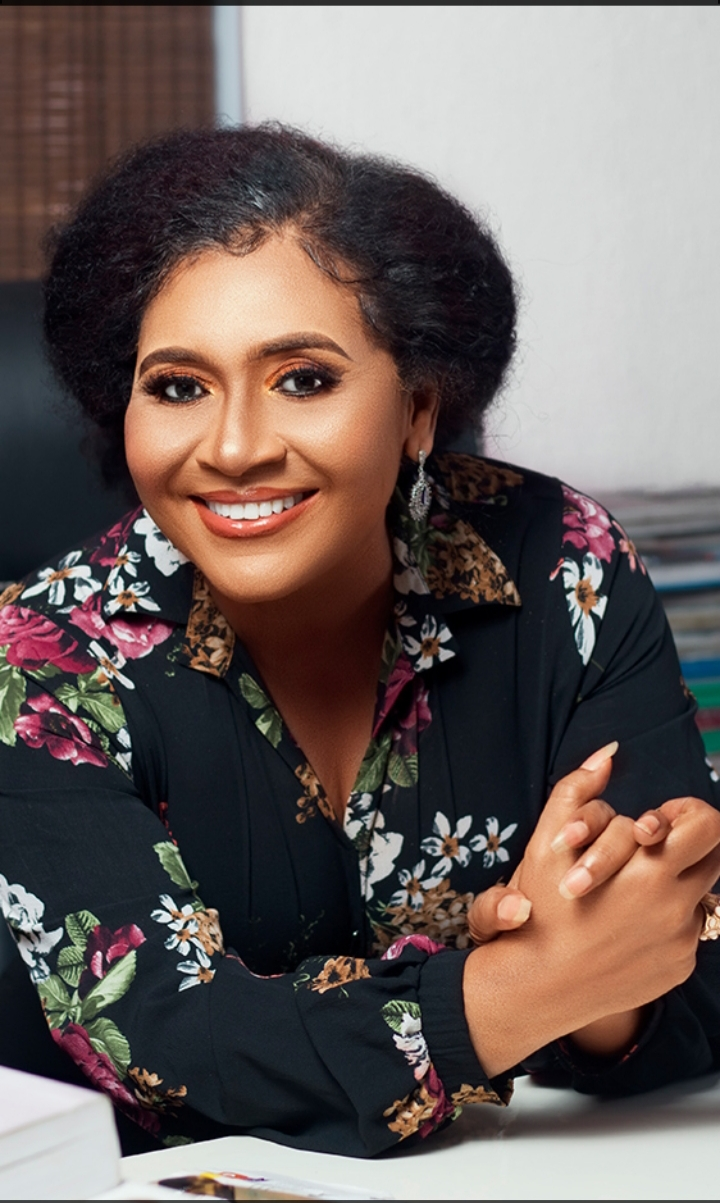
- Dokubo at a product bid photoshoot in Lagos
- Born: October 22, 1969 (age 57); Port-Harcourt, Rivers State Nigeria
- Education: Theatre Arts, University of Port Harcourt
- Occupation: Actress
- Years active: 1992 to present

Hilda Dokubo is a Nigerian film actress, author, social justice advocate, and politician who once served as special adviser on youth affairs to Peter Odili, a former Governor of Rivers State. She is currently the chairman of Labour Party in Rivers State, but there is a report of her being suspended from the post, which she stated as a 'distraction'. In another development, the Asari-Toru local government area of the Labour Party in Rivers State organized a press release and dismissed the suspension of Hilda Dokubo, saying that it has confidence in her leadership.

== Early life and education ==
Hilda Dokubo was born as the first of six children in Buguma, a town in Asari-Toru, Rivers State, in the South-South region of Nigeria, she went on to complete her primary and secondary school education at St. Mary State School Aggrey Road and Government Girls Secondary School respectively. Her father was an engineer, while her mother was a school teacher. She is an alumna of the University of Port Harcourt where she earned her bachelor's degree and master's degrees in Theatre Arts.

== Career ==
Dokubo made her screen debut during her youth service (NYSC) in a 1992 film titled Evil Passion. She has since been featured in and has produced several Nigerian films. including Gone Forever, End of the Wicked, My Goodwill, and The CEO Upon starring in a supporting role in a 2015 film titled Stigma, Dokubo won Best Actress in a Supporting Role and Best Actress in the comedy category 11th Africa Movie Academy Awards. In 2019, she featured in the movie Locked, a story about mental health awareness She founded and runs a non-governmental organisation, the Centre for Creative Arts Education (CREATE), which deploys the creative arts to empower women and the youth

== Activism ==
In June 2020, Dokubo joined other protesters in a street march in Lagos against rape and other violent crimes against women. In October 2020, she was part of the End SARS protests in Port-Harcourt against police brutality Alongside Kate Henshaw in March 2020, Dokubo launched an online protest against the appointment of Senator Ishaku Elisha Dabo of Adamawa North Senatorial District as a patron of the Actors Guild of Nigeria

== Political activities ==
Hilda was made the Caretaker Chairman of the Labour Party (LP) of the Rivers State Chapter. However, she was suspended in February 2025 and was accused of misconduct, extortion, and negligence. It should be remembered that Hilda Dokubo was appointed to head a three-man Steering Committee under the Labour Party in Rivers State. The appointment was meant to be for one month.

== Filmography ==
- Without Love
- Forever (1995)
- Jezebel
- Evil Passion(1996)
- Hour of Grace(2001)
- Fatal Desire
- Error of the Past (2000)
- Sweet Mother (2000)
- Black Maria (1997)
- End of the Wicked (1999) as Stella
- "Confidence"
- Onye-Eze (2001) as Feoma
- My Good Will (2001)
- Borderline (2001)
- Light & Darkness (2001)
- A Barber's Wisdom (2001)
- My Love (1998)
- Above Death: In God We Trust (2003)
- World Apart (2004) as Rhoda
- With God (2004)
- Unfaithful (2004)
- Chameleon (2004)
- 21 Days With Christ (2005)
- Gone Forever (2006)
- Stigma(2013) as Mama
- The CEO (2016) as Superintendent Ebenezer
- Locked (2019) as Dr. Mrs. Ife Adu
- Accidental Affairs (2019) as Dr Peters
- Stuck (2022) as Mrs. Julie Ogolo
- A Sunday Affair (2023) as Mrs. Okwara
- Kill Boro (2024) as Mama Fanta

Fatal

- Strange Sisters (2022)
- The Uprising: Wives on Strike 3 (2024)

== Awards and nominations ==
| Year | Award ceremony | Prize | Result | Ref |
|---|---|---|---|---|
| 2015 | 11th Africa Movie Academy Awards | Best Actress in a Supporting Role | Won | |
| 2015 | 12th Abuja International Film Festival | Outstanding Female Act in a Film | Won | |
| 2013 | Wise Women Awards | Woman in Media Awards | Nominated | Co-nominees include Igazeuma Okoroba and Lara Wise |
