= Segun Arinze =

Nigerian actor and singer (born 1965)

- Born: Segun Padonou Aina; 24 September 1965 (age 61); Onitsha, Anambra State, Nigeria
- Education: Obafemi Awolowo University
- Occupations: Actor, singer

Segun Arinze (born Segun Padonou Aina; 24 September 1965) is a Nigerian actor and singer.

== Early life and education ==
Arinze was born on 24 September 1965 to Lydia Padonou in Onitsha, Anambra State. He is the eldest of seven children. He hails from Badagry, Lagos State. He attended Victory College of Commerce, Edidi, in Kwara State, and later Taba Commercial College in Kaduna State, where he completed his secondary education. He studied dramatic arts at Obafemi Awolowo University in Ile-Ife, Osun State.

== Career ==
Arinze started his career professionally as a singer and an actor. Music first brought him to prominence following the release of his debut album, Dream, which was not a commercial success. He began his acting career in Ilorin.

He is popularly known as "Black Arrow" from his role in the 1996 film Silent Night directed by Chico Ejiro.

In addition to acting, Arinze is an acting coach and works with an African international film festival mentoring younger actors.

== Personal life ==
Arinze was married to fellow Nollywood actress Anne Njemanze. The couple have one daughter, Renny Morenike, who was born on 10 May.

== Selected filmography ==
- Across the Niger (2004)
- Silent Night (1996) as Arrow
- Eye for Eye (1999) as Lee
- Curse from Beyond (1999) as George
- Mark of the Beast (1999) as Doctor 1
- Karishika 2 (1999)
- Vuga (2000)
- Highway to the Grave (2000) as Tony
- Borderline (2001)
- Chronicles (with Onyeka Onwenu and Victor Osuagwu)
- Family on Fire (2011)
- A Place in the Stars (2014) as Diokpa Okonkwo
- Invasion 1897 (2014)
- My Sugar (2015) as Bobo
- Yellow Cassava (2016) as Chief Blaki
- Blogger's Wife (2017)
- Deepest Cut (2018) - with Majid Michel and Zach Orji
- The Island (2018) as Major Gata
- Gold Statue (2019) as Zonal Commander
- Òlòtūré (2019) as Theo
- She Is (2019) Dr. Mark
- Who's the Boss (2020) as Tunde
- The Supervisor (2021) as Dan
- Blackout (2021) as Adika
- Blood Sisters (2022) as Superintendent Tijano Bello
- Ijakumo The Born Again Stripper (2022) as Chief Makun
- Almajiri (2022) as Alhaji
- Palava! (2022) as Bayo
- The 3 Sides (2022) as Philip
- Wasila Coded Reloaded (2022) as Chairman
- A Dead's Man's Tale (2022) as Benjamin
- Tit for Tat (2023) as Eyinna
- The Bloom Boys (2023) as Inspector Mike
- Indulgence (2023)
- Something Like Gold (2023) as Demola's Father
- Áfàméfùnà: An Nwa Boi Story (2023)
- Broken Sceptre (2024) as Ndayo
- Shina (2024) as Dr. Bakare
- Criminal (2024) as DPO Okafor
- Iron Bar (2024) as King 1
- Ill fated (2024) as Mr. Johnson
- The Beads (2024) as Mr. Obi
- Headless (2024) as DSP Agba
- The Party (2025)

== Awards and nominations ==
Year	Award ceremony	Category	Film	Result	Ref
2017	Best of Nollywood Awards	Best Supporting Actor –English	Tatu	Nominated	
