= Bimbo Akintola =

Nigerian actress (born 1973)

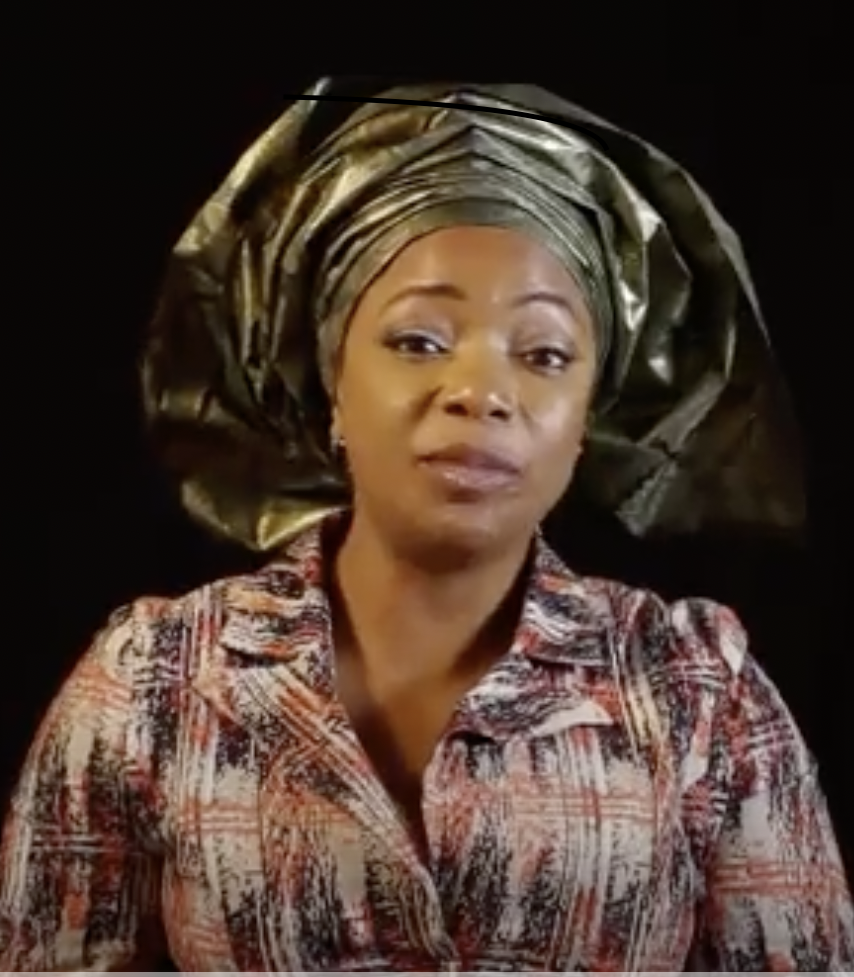
- Born: 5 May 1973 (age 53); Ibadan
- Education: University of Ibadan (BA)
- Occupation: Actress
- Years active: 1995–present

Bimbo Akintola (born 5 May 1973) is a Nigerian actress.

== Early life and education ==
Akintola was born on 5 May 1973 to a father from Oyo State and a mother from Edo State, Nigeria. She studied at Maryland Convent Private School in Lagos State. She proceeded to Command Day Secondary School, Lagos. She earned a degree in Theater Arts from University of Ibadan.

== Early life ==
A family of six includes Abimbola as the third child. She began portraying a student alongside her peers for the school's end-of-year theater events, encouraged by her mother. Her enthusiasm for performing intensified as she participated in more plays, eventually becoming a second nature.

She was raised in Maryland, Lagos, where she received her elementary education at Maryland Convent Private School and her secondary school at Command Day School, also in Lagos. She completed her undergraduate studies in theatre arts at the University of Ibadan. The actress used to perform every weekend with the late Jaiye Aboderin at a club called Divine on Allen Avenue in Lagos when she was still in school.

== Career ==
Her acting debut was when she featured in the film Owo Blow in 1995 alongside Femi Adebayo and followed up with Out of Bounds in 1997 with Richard Mofe Damijo. She was nominated for Best Actress in a Leading Role at the 2013 Nollywood Movies Awards.

Other recognitions for her skills include:

1. Best Actress or English Actress in Nigeria in 1997.

2. Best Actress Award for the movie Heaven's Hell at the 2015 Eko International Film Festival.

== Selected filmography ==
- Owo Blow: The Genesis (1997) - as Mope Owolabi
- Out of Bounds (1997)
- Diamond Ring (1998)
- Amadas (1998)
- The Gardner (1998)
- Dangerous Twins (2004)
- Without Shame (2005) - as Christy
- Last Dance (2006) - as Sasha
- Dar 2 Lagos (2006) - as Mihayo Maganga
- Beyond the Verdict (2007) - as Defense Counsel
- Smoke and Mirrors (2008) - as Nkechi
- Hoodrush (2012) - as Alhaja Khadijah
- Ayitale (2013) - as Kemi
- Heaven's Hell (2015)
- Husbands of Lagos (2015)
- 93 Days (2016) - as Dr. Ameyo Adadevoh
- In Our Trap (2017) - as Chisom
- Diamonds In The Sky (2019) - as Labake Aliyu
- Lady Buckit and the Motley Mopsters (2020) - as iyabo Bozimo
- The New Normal (2020) - as Madam Jade
- Poor-ish (2021) - as Alero
- Dawn at Midnight (2022) - as Judy
- Ijakumo: The Born Again Stripper (2022) - as Madam Olanitemi
- Dangerous Mission (2023) - as Doris
- The Black Book (2023) - as Professor Craig
- Beast of Two Worlds (2024) - as Abiade
- The Farewell Plan (2024)
- Freedom Way (2024)
- Alakada: Bad and Boujee (2024)

== Television series ==
Year:	Title:	Role	Director:	Ref
2015	Husbands of Lagos	—N/a	—N/a	
2016	Ere Egele	—N/a	Kunle Afolayan	
2025	To Kill a Monkey		Kemi Adetiba	
