= Chizzy Alichi =

Nigerian film actress (born 1988)

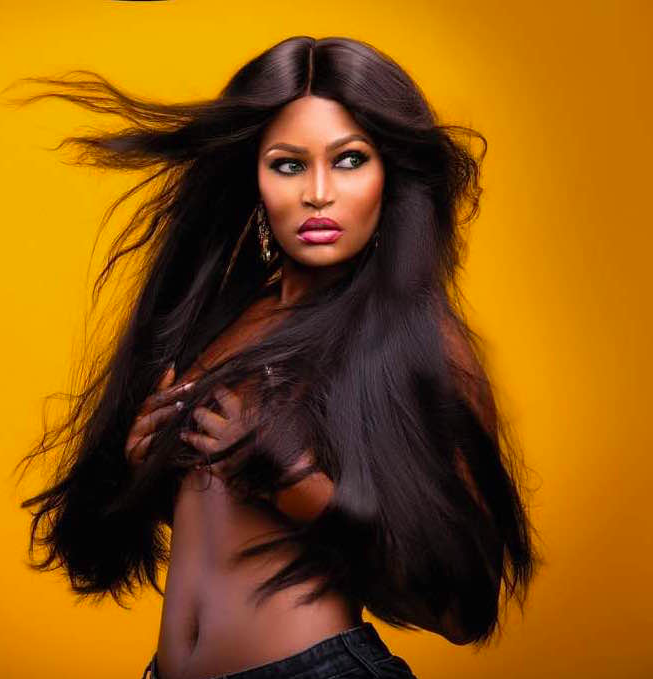
- Chizzy Alichi
- Born: Chigozie Stephanie Alichi; 23 December 1988 (age 37); Enugu
- Education: Enugu State University of Science and Technology
- Occupation: Film actress
- Years active: 2010–present
- Spouse: Chike Ugochukwu Mbah
- Website: www.chizzyalichi.com

Chigozie Stephanie Alichi // (born 23 December 1988), known as Chizzy Alichi, is a Nigerian film actress.

== Life ==
Alichi is from Ezza Nkwubor Nike in Enugu East, a local government area of Enugu State, located in South East (Nigeria). She is the last child with two siblings. She made headlines when she built a mansion for her parents in 2017. She lives in Asaba, Delta. She holds a bachelor's degree in Agriculture Engineering from Enugu State University of Science and Technology.

Her parents are Mr and Mrs Alexander Alichi. In December 2019, Alichi married Chike Ugochukwu Mbah. The wedding was attended by celebrities including Patience Ozokwor.

== Career ==
Alichi joined Nollywood in 2010 by chance. She randomly joined the Actors Guild of Nigeria, applied for a movie role and got her first ever opportunity as an actress in a movie titled Magic Money featuring Mercy Johnson and Bob-Manuel Udokwu. The turning point of her career came with the movie Akaraoku, which means "hot akara", in 2016, Directed by Yul Edochie. The movie poster went viral on social media when people assumed the actress was an akara seller. She has featured in more movies as a result in 2017.

=== Song appearances ===
Year	Song	Artist	Notes
2016	"Mmege"	Flavour N'abania	

== Awards ==
Year	Award	Category	Result	Notes
2017	City People Entertainment Awards.	Best New Actress Of The Year (English)	Nominated	
2017	Nigeria Achievers Award.	Next Rated Actress Of The Year	Won	

== Selected filmography ==
Year	Film	Role	Notes
2025	Aso Ebi Diaries		Starring Kunle Remi, KieKie, Nancy Isime, Shaffy Bello
2018	Do Good Nwakpaka		Starring Ebele Okaro
2018	My Story		
2018	Power of Madness		Starring Nonso Diobi, Ngozi Ezeonu
2017	Point & Kill		Starring Nonso Diobi
2017	Tears of Victory		Starring Yul Edochie
2017	Power in The palace		Starring Chioma Chukwuka
2017	Obudu The Evil Shrine		Starring Ebele Okaro
2017	Teckno In The Village		
2017	Little Oath		Starring Chiwetalu Agu, Ken Erics
2017	Beautiful Mmege		Starring Ebele Okaro
2017	The King's Wealth		Starring Clem Ohameze
2017	Teri Teri		Starring Rachael Okonkwo
2017	Virgin Justice		Starring Regina Daniels
2017	Fada Fada		Starring Yul Edochie
2017	Financial Woman		Starring Yul Edochie
2017	Ajebo America		Starring Ken Erics, Nonso Diobi
2016	Akaraoku	Akara Oku	Starring Yul Edochie
2015	Vanity		Starring Ngozi Ezeonu
2015	Attitude	Joan	
2014	Idemmili		Starring Pete Edochie, Patience Ozokwor, Yul Edochie
2014	The Motherless		Starring Ini Edo
2014	Old Soldier		Starring Nkem Owoh, Osita Iheme, Chinedu Ikedieze, Ime Bishop Umoh
2014	The Three Blind		Starring Chika Ike
2013	Cry of a Witch	Ifeoma	
2011	Double Barrel		Starring Francis Odega, Amaechi Muonagor
2011	Sherikoko		Starring John Okafor, Funke Akindele
2010	Forgive Me Father		Starring Nkem Owoh, Osita Iheme
2010	Magic Money		Starring Mercy Johnson, Bob-Manuel Udokwu
