= List of Nigerian films of 2021 =

This is a list of Nigerian films scheduled for release in 2021.

== 2021 ==
=== January–March ===
Opening		Title	Director	Cast	Genre	Notes	Ref.
J A N U A R Y	1	Day of Destiny	Akay Mason Abosi Ogba	Olumide Oworu Denola Grey Norbert Young Toyin Abraham Jide Kosoko	Sci-fi adventure	The film was initially supposed to have its theatrical release on 30 October 2020 but was postponed to 1 January 2021 due to End SARS protests.	
J A N U A R Y	1	The Miracle Centre	Niyi Towolawi	Odunalade Adekola Femi Adebayo Ayo Mogaji Yemi Sodimu Afeez 'Saka' Oyetoro	Situation comedy	Comically examines the problems of Nigeria's educational system.	
J A N U A R Y	22	Tanwa Savage	Geshin Salvador	Segun Arinze Timini Egbuson Bimbo Ademoye Linda Osifo	Comedy drama		
J A N U A R Y	22	The Cleanser	James Abinibi	Kehinde Bankole Bolanle Ninalowo Alex Osifo Antar Laniyan	Thriller		
J A N U A R Y	29	Sanitation Day	Seyi Babatope	Blossom Chukwujekwu Elozonam Nse Ikpe Etim Elvina Ibru	Comedy thriller		
F E B R U A R Y	14	Namaste Wahala	Hamisha Daryani Ahuja	Ini Dima-Okojie Richard Mofe-Damijo Joke Silva Jude Abaga	Romantic comedy		
F E B R U A R Y	12	Still Falling	Karachi Atiya and Dimbo Atiya	Daniel Etim Effiong Sharon Ooja Kunle Remi Liz Ameye	Romantic drama		
F E B R U A R Y	12	Fine Wine	Seyi Babatope	Richard Mofe Damijo Zainab Balogun Ego Nwosu Keppy Ekpenyong	Romantic comedy		
M A R C H	12	Ponzi	Kayode Kasum	Timini Egbuson Uzoamaka Aniunoh Jide Kosoko Mawuli Gavor	Comedy	Based on victims of the 2016 Ponzi scheme, MMM	
M A R C H	12	Under the Carpet	Tope Alake	Iyabo Ojo Deyemi Okanlawon Femi Jacobs.	Romantic drama		
M A R C H	12	Eagle Wings	Paul Apel Papel	Femi Jacobs Enyinna Nwigwe Yakubu Mohammed Uzee Usman	War film	Based on true events	
M A R C H	19	Mamba's Diamond	Seyi Babatope	Osas Ighodaro Gabriel Afolayan Uchemba Williams Nse Ikpe-Etim	Action comedy	Production debut for Williams Uchemba	
M A R C H	19	La Femme Anjola	Mildred Okwo	Nonso Bassey Joke Silva Rita Dominic Femi Jacobs	Psychological Thriller		
M A R C H	19	The Razz Guy	Udoka Onyeka	Nancy Isime Lasisi Elenu Broda Shaggi MC Lively	Comedy	Lead debut for Lasisi Elenu	
M A R C H	26	The Therapist	Kayode Kasum	Rita Dominic Michelle Dede Toyin Abraham Shaffy Bello Tope Tedela			

=== April–June ===
Opening		Title	Director	Cast	Genre	Notes	Ref.
A P R I L	2	Prophetess	Niyi Akinmolayan	Toyin Abraham Lateef Adedimeji Muyiwa Ademola Tina Mba	Comedy		
A P R I L	16	Breaded Life	Biodun Stephen	Timini Egbuson Bimbo Ademoye Tina Mba Jide Kosoko	Romantic comedy		
A P R I L	23	Eyimofe	Ari and Chuko Esiri	Jude Akuwudike Temi Ami-Williams Cynthia Ebijie Sadiq Daba			
A P R I L	30	The Wait	Yemi Morafa	Nse Ikpe Etim Deyemi Okanlawon Jimmy Odukoya Chimezie Imo	Faith based		
A P R I L	30	Suga Suga	Richard Omos	Taiwo Obileye Ayo Adesanya Tana Adelana Wole Ojo	Comedy	G-Worldwide debut production	
M A Y	14	Mimi	Samuel ‘’Bigsam’’ Olatunji	Ali Baba Ireti Doyle Toyin Abraham Prince Jide Kosoko Bimbo Akintola			
M A Y	18	Lockdown	Moses Inwang	Omotola Jalade-Ekeinde Tony Umez Charles Awurum Sola Sobowale Nobert Young	Psychological thriller	Co-produced by Sneeze Films, FilmOne and CEM media group.	
J U N E	11	My Village People	Niyi Akinmolayan	Bovi Ugboma Nkem Owoh Amaechi Muonagor Charles Inojie Rachael Oniga	Comedy	Co-produced by Kountry Kulture Network, FilmOne Entertainment and TMPL Motion Pictures	
J U N E	12	The New Patriots	Terry Ayebo	Akin Lewis Dele Odule Bimbo Oshin Taiwo Ibikunle Lateef Adedimeji	Political thriller	Selected for 4 film festivals	
J U N E	12	Badamasi	Obi Emelonye	Enyinna Nwigwe Charles Inojie Sani Danja Yakubu Mohammed	Biopic	Biopic of Ibrahim Babangida, former Nigerian head of state	
J U N E	16	Dwindle	Kayode Kasum Dare Olaitan	Funke Akindele-Bello Bisola Aiyeola Jidekene Achufusi Samuel Perry Uzor Arukwe	Comedy	Produced by Mimi Bartels	
J U N E	18	Ayinla	Tunde Kelani	Lateef Adedimeji Bimbo Manuel Ade Laoye Kunle Afolayan Bimbo Ademoye	Musical Biopic	Based on the life and times of Apala musician, Ayinla Omowura.	

=== July–September ===
Opening		Title	Director	Cast	Genre	Notes	Ref.
J U L Y	2	Devil In Agbada	Umanu Elijah	Erica Nlewedim Linda Osifo Efe Irele	Action		
J U L Y	9	Gone	Daniel Ademinokan	Sam Dede Gabriel Afolayan Stella Damasus Ada Ameh Bimbo Manuel			
A U G U S T	20	Loving Rona	Luke Aire Oyovbaire	Meg Otanwa Gideon Okeke Jeffbankz Nweke	Romance		
S E P T E M B E R	10	The Ghost and the Tout Too	Michael 'Ama Psalmist' Akinrogunde	Mercy Johnson-Okojie Patience Ozokwo Iyabo Ojo Odunlade Adekola	Dramatic comedy		
S E P T E M B E R	10	Love Castle	Desmond Eliott	Kehinde Bankole Jide Kosoko Zack Orji Desmond Elliot Femi Adebayo Salami			

=== October–December ===
Opening		Title	Director	Cast	Genre	Notes	Ref.
O C T O B E R	15	Charge and Bail	Uyoyou Adia	Zainab Balogun Stan Nze Elozonam Ogbolu Folu Storms Eso Dike	Comedy drama	By Inkblot productions	
O C T O B E R	29	Progressive Tailors Club	Biodun Stephen	Femi Adebayo Salami Jaiye Kuti Rachel Oniga Uzor Arukwe	Political satire	By Anthill Studios	
N O V E M B E R	TBA	Cordelia	Tunde Kelani			Based on a novel of the same name by Femi Osofisan	
N O V E M B E R	26	Soólè	Kayode Kasum	Sola Sobowale Adedimeji Lateef Femi Jacob Adunni Ade Shawn Faqua	Comedy drama	Production debut for Adunni Ade	
D E C E M B E R	16	A Naija Christmas	Kunle Afolayan	Rachel Oniga Abayomi Alvin Efa Iwara Kunle Remi	Romantic Comedy	First Nigerian Christmas film on Netflix	
D E C E M B E R	17	Aki and Pawpaw		Chinedu Ikedieze; Osita Iheme; Amaechi Muonagor; Toyin Abraham; Chioma Okafor		Remake of the 2002 film, Aki Na Ukwa	
D E C E M B E R	24	Christmas in Miami	Robert Peters	AY Makun; Richard Mofe-Damijo; Osita Iheme; John Amos.	Comedy	Fourth film in AY Makun's Akpos series after 30 Days in Atlanta, A Trip to Jamaica and 10 Days in Suncity	
D E C E M B E R	29	Superstar	Akhigbe Illozhobie	Nancy Isime Deyemi Okanlawon Timini Egbuson Daniel Etim Effiong Eku Edewor	Romantic comedy	By Inkblot productions	

== Unknown release dates ==
Comedian Uduak angel on

- Window Bird

== See also ==
- 2021 in Nigeria
- List of Nigerian films
