= Yul Edochie =

Nigerian actor (born 1982)

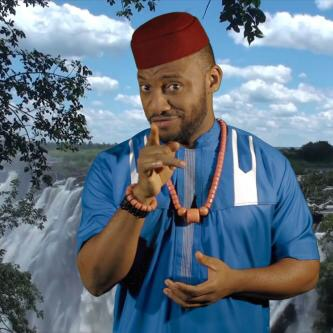
- Edochie in 2016
- Born: Yul Chibuike Daniel Edochie; 7 January 1982 (age 44); Lagos, Nigeria
- Education: University of Port Harcourt
- Occupation: Actor
- Years active: 2010 — present
- Spouses: May Yul-Edochie (m. 2004; sep. 2022); Judy Austin Yul-Edochie (married 2022)
- Children: 6
- Father: Pete Edochie
- Relatives: Muna Obiekwe (cousin)
- Website: yuledochietv.com

Yul Chibuike Daniel Edochie // (born 7 January 1982), popularly known as Yul Edochie//, is a Nigerian actor and politician.

== Early life and education ==
Edochie was born on 7 January 1982. He is from Anambra State and is the son of actor Pete Edochie, the youngest of six children. He was raised in both Lagos and Enugu. He was named after the Russian actor Yul Brynner. He attended the University of Port Harcourt, where he received a Bachelor of Arts in dramatic arts.

== Career ==
Edochie made his Nollywood debut in 2005 with the film The Exquires, starring alongside Justus Esiri and Enebeli Elebuwa. His breakthrough came in 2007 after featuring alongside Genevieve Nnaji and Desmond Elliot in the film Wind Of Glory.

In 2015, Edochie established a film academy in Lagos.

In February 2026, Yul Edochie was honoured by the Directors Guild of Nigeria (DGN) with the Most Outstanding Actor of the Year 2025 award, recognising his consistent acting contributions and impact in the Nigerian film industry.

=== Politics ===
In 2017, Edochie ran for governor of Anambra State and was the gubernatorial candidate for the Democratic Peoples Congress political party. Willie Obiano, who was seeking re-election, won a second term.

== Personal life ==
Edochie married May Aligwe at age 21. She was one year younger than him, 20 years old. The couple had three sons and a daughter together, but separated in 2022 after he announced that he had taken a second wife. On 27 April 2022, he revealed that he had married fellow actor Judy Austin, with whom he has two sons and welcomed a daughter in June 2025. His eldest son died on 30 March 2023 after having a seizure.

May Aligwe filed for divorce in 2023 and although they are currently estranged, the divorce has not been finalised yet.

He currently resides in Abuja with Judy Austin and their 3 children.

== Filmography ==
Year	Film	Role	Notes
2007	Sleek Ladies		Starring Daniella Okeke, Ini Edo, Rita Dominic
2007	Wind of Glory	Emeka	Starring Desmond Elliot, Genevieve Nnaji
2008	Give It Up		Starring Mike Ezuruonye, Ini Edo
2008	Kiss My Pain	Johnson	Starring Mike Ezuruonye, Mercy Johnson
2009	Tears of Hope		Starring Ngozi Ezeonu, Olu Jacobs, Mercy Johnson
2009	My Loving Heart		Starring Stella Damasus-Aboderin
2010	Unstoppable	Chris	
2011	Sarafina	Owen	Starring Rita Dominic, Halima Abubakar
2011	Pleasure and Crime	Johnson	
2012	Zone 9		Starring Nkem Owoh, Annie Macaulay–Idibia
2012	Bridge of Contract		Starring Patience Ozokwor, Chika Ike, Chacha Eke
2012	The End is Near		Starring Patience Ozokwor, Chika Ike, Chacha Eke
2012	Against The Law	Anthony	Starring Olu Jacobs, Van Vicker
2013	Eye Of The Eagle		
2013	Death Certificate		Starring Stephanie Okereke
2013	The Jezebels		Starring Tonto Dikeh
2013	Blind Choice		Starring Oge Okoye
2013	Money Kingdom		Starring Clem Ohameze Pete Edochie
2013	Agony Of A Princess		Starring Chioma Chukwuka
2013	Restless Soul		Starring Chika Ike
2014	The Mirror		Film Director Teco Benson Starring Kate Henshaw
2014	Chioma The Weeping Queen	Prince Chukwuemeka	
2014	Apostles Of Lucifer		Starring Ini Edo
2014	Python Queen	Prince Oma	Starring Patience Ozokwor, Nuella Njubigbo
2015	Dooshima	Director	Starring Mike Ezuruonye
2015	Ojuju Calabar		Starring Belinda Effah, Ebube Nwagbo
2015	Royal Maid	Prince Izozo	Starring Eucharia Anunobi
2015	Compound Fools		Starring Funke Akindele
2015	Dowry Man	Uche	Starring Monalisa Chinda, Iyabo Ojo
2016	Poka Messiah	Hades	Directed by Ernest Obi
2017	The Affectionate Wife		Starring Queen Nwokoye
2017	Passion of a Prince		Starring Chiwetalu Agu
2017	Mysterious Family		
2017	ATM Machine	Nicodemus	Starring Nkechi Nweje, Destiny Etiko, Jerry Williams
????	Royal Choice		Starring Joyce Kalu
2018	The Billionaires	Eze Kwe Eche	Starring Osita Iheme
2018	Moms at War	Chidi Ubosi	Starring Omoni Oboli, Funke Akindele
2018	Native Girl	Uchenna	Starring Judy Austin, Ifeanyi Azodo, Chigozie Atuanya
2018	Innocent Oath	Dubem	Starring Hayez Achu, Sese Ayanwu
2019	Clairvoyance		Starring Nkechi Blessing, Sapphire Ekeng
2019	Poor Billionaire	Chima	Starring Cynthia Ashimba, Great Emmanuel Chika
2021	About Time	Larry	Starring Patience Attang, Khing Bassey
2022	Ikemba		Starring Chiwetalu Agu, Pete Edochie,
2022	The Last Enigma	Afamefuna	

=== Television ===
- The Palace
- Royal Castle
- Tinsel

== Awards ==
Year	Award	Category	Result	Notes	Ref
2009	City People Entertainment Awards	Best New Actor Of The Year (English)	Won		
2012	2012 Nollywood Movies Awards	Best Actor In A Supporting Role	Nominated		
2013	City People Entertainment Awards	Best Actor of the Year (English)	Won		
2013	Pamsaa Awards	Best Actor	Won		
2014	2014 Nollywood Movies Awards	Best Lead Male	Nominated		
2015	Afrifimo Awards	Best Actor	Nominated	Afrifimo Special Recognition Award 2015 was given	
2021	Net Honours	Most Searched Actor	Nominated		
