= Uche Odoputa =

Nigerian film and television actor

- Born: Uche Odoputa; September 23, 1968 (age 58); Imo State, Nigeria
- Occupation: Actor
- Years active: 1993-present

Uche Odoputa // is a UK based Nollywood actor, filmmaker and story teller.

With a career spanning more than three decades, he has reportedly appeared in over 50 film and television productions. He emerged during the formative home-video era of Nollywood and has continued working across cinema, television and independently distributed digital films.

Odoputa is known for his appearances in productions including Rattlesnake, Oganigwe, Issakaba, Last Flight to Abuja, Husbands of Lagos and Ojukwu. In addition to acting, he has worked in directing and film production and operates Uche Odoputa TV, a digital platform through which independent Nollywood films are promoted and distributed.

== Early life ==
Uche was born on 23 September 1968 and is from Orlu in Imo State, south eastern Nigeria.

== Career ==
=== Early Career ===
Odoputa began his acting career during the growth of Nigeria's home-video industry in the early 1990's. One of his earliest identified acting experiences was in the NTA Benin production Pot of Life.

He subsequently appeared in Rattlesnake in 1995; directed by Amaka Igwe and released in several parts, the production became one of the notable Nigerian screen works of the 1990's.

His credits from the late 1990s and early 2000s include Day of Reckoning, Oganigwe, The Last Burial and other productions associated with early Nollywood home-video industry.

In 2001, Odoputa portrayed Osita in Issakaba, directed by Lancelot Oduwa Imasuen. The film follows a group of vigilantes confronting armed criminals who are depicted as using supernatural powers. The production became widely recognised within early Nollywood and featured an ensemble that included Sam Dede, Chinwetalu Agu, Pete Eneh, Amaechi Muonagor, John Okafor and Zulu Adigwe.

Odoputa's other early and mid-career appearances include "Serious Blunder", "Holy Life", and "House of Trouble". During this period, he worked alongside other actors including Patience Ozokwor, Zack Orji and Nkem Owoh.

=== Film and television work ===
In 2012, Odoputa played Efe in Obi Emelonye's disaster thriller, Last Flight to Abuja. The film follows passengers travelling on a troubled flight between Lagos and Abuja; and featured an ensemble cast including Omotola Jalade Ekehinde, Hakeem Kae-Kazim, Jim Iyke, Jide Kosoko, Ali Nuhu and Uru Eke.

Last Flight to Abuja received five nominations at the 2013 Africa Movie Academy Awards and won the award for Best Film by an African abroad.

Odoputa subsequently appeared in films including Mad Couple, Mad Couple 2, The Missing Bell, Curse of the Seven, Perfect and The Road Not Taken.

From 2016 to 2017, he appeared as Chief Livinus in the television drama Husbands of Lagos. In 2018, he appeared in the Rok Studios television drama Ojukwu alongside Francis Duru, Mary Njoku, Eve Esin and Obi Okoli.

His later work includes "Tear Away", "Price Less Woman", "Foreign King" and "Misunderstood".

== Uche Odoputa TV ==
Odoputa established Uche Odoputa TV as a platform for developing, promoting and digitally distributing independent Nollywood productions. The platform publishes feature-length films for audiences in Nigeria and across the African diaspora through YouTube.

Productions released or promoted through Uche Odoputa TV include "Foreign King", "Marked for Death", "Misunderstood", "Two Hearts", "Christmas Miracle", "The Lineage", "Soul Reckoning" and "Head in the Clouds".

In 2026, Odoputa invested in "Head in the Clouds", which was subsequently released through Uche Odoputa TV.

Through Uche Odoputa TV, Odoputa has extended his career into independent film development and direct digital distribution. The channel's films generally focus on family, relationships, marriage, betrayal, ambition, social pressures, accountability, healing and redemption.

== Philanthropy ==
Odoputa is the founder of the Uche Odoputa Foundation. The organisation's stated activities include educational support for orphans, healthcare assistance for disadvantage people and financial and vocational support for widows and other vulnerable members of society.

== Selected filmography ==
| Year | Title | Role or Credit |
|---|---|---|
| Early 1990s | Pot of LIfe | Actor |
| 1995 | Rattlesnake | Actor |
| 1999 | Day of Reckoning | Actor |
| 1999 | Oganigwe | Actor |
| 2000 | The Last Burial | Actor |
| 2000 | Disaster | Actor |
| 2001 | Issakaba | Actor |
| 2015 | House of Trouble | Actor |
| | Holy Life | |
| | Hot Brother | |
| 2012 | Last Flight to Abuja | Actor |
| 2014 | Mad Couple | Actor |
| 2014 | Mad Couple 2 | Actor |
| 2016 | The Missing Bell | Actor |
| 2016 | Curse of the Seven | Actor |
| 2016 - 2017 | Husband of Lagos | Actor |
| 2017 | Switch | Actor |
| 2017 | Perfect | Actor |
| 2017 | The Road Not Taken | Actor |
| 2018 | Ojukwu | Actor |
| 2018 | Eleven Days | Actor |
| 2022 | Tear Away | Actor |
| 2022 | The Throne / Open Throne | Actor |
| 2022 | Priceless Woman | Actor |
| | Foreign King | Actor |
| 2025 | Misunderstood | Actor |
| 2025 | Christmas Miracle | Actor |
| 2026 | The Lineage | Actor |
| 2026 | Soul Reckoning | Actor |
| 2026 | Head in the Clouds | Investor |

== Career Summary ==
Odoputa's career spans the formative home-video years of Nollywood, the expansion of Nigerian television and cinema ad the industry's more recent transition to digital distribution.

Over more than three decades, he has developed from an actor associated with early Nollywood productions into a director, producer, film investor and digital-content owner. His work through Uche Odoputa TV represents the latest stage of that career allowing films to be developed and distributed directly to an international online audience.
