= Mercy Johnson =

Nigerian actress (born 1984)

Mercy Johnson-Okojie
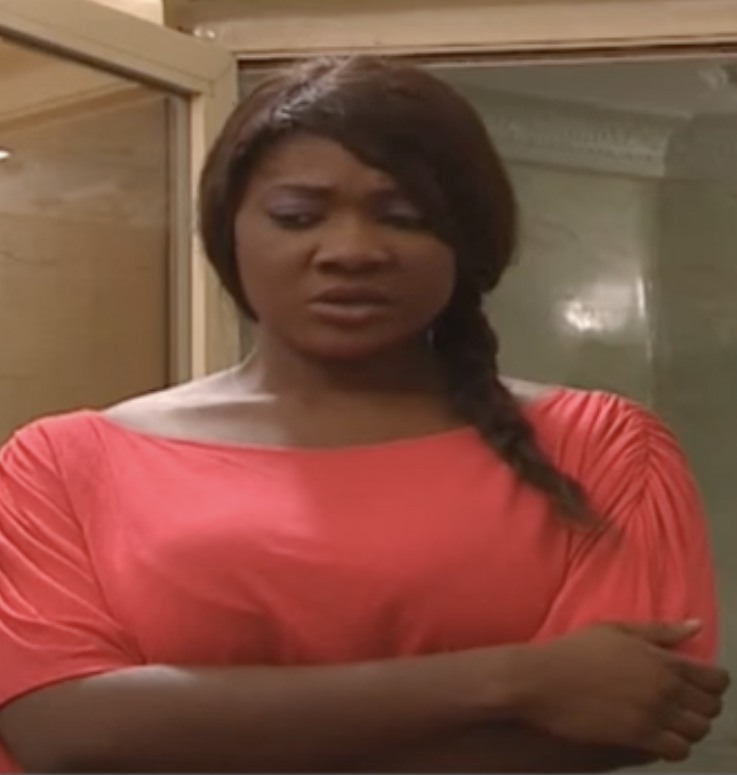
- Johnson in 2018
- Born: Mercy Ozioma Johnson; 28 August 1984 (age 41); Lagos, Nigeria
- Occupation: Actress
- Years active: 2004 – present
- Spouse: Prince Odianosen Okojie (m. 2011)
- Children: 4
- Parents: Daniel Johnson; Elizabeth Johnson (d. May 2018)

Mercy Johnson-Okojie (//; born 28 August 1984) is a Nigerian actress, film director and producer.

== Early life ==
Okojie was born as the fourth out of seven children of Daniel Johnson, a former naval officer, and his wife, Elizabeth. She was born in Lagos, Nigeria but originally comes from Okene, Kogi State. She started her primary education in Calabar, Cross River State where she attended Nigerian Navy Secondary School, Port Harcourt.

After her secondary education, Okojie auditioned for a role in The Maid. She also appeared in many films including Hustlers, Baby Oku in America, and War in the Palace. In 2009, she won Best Supporting Actress at the Africa Movie Academy Awards for her performance in Live to Remember, and Best Actress at the 2013 Africa Magic Viewers Choice Awards for her role in the comedy movie Dumebi the Dirty Girl. She married Prince Odianosen Okojie on 27 August 2011 and in December, she was listed as Google's most searched Nigerian celebrity, a position she also held in 2012. She is the Senior Special Assistant (SSA) to Yahaya Bello on entertainment, arts and culture. The post took effect on 1 April 2017.

Okojie was banned from acting films on 3 November 2013; she was cited as collecting high payment for movie roles. The ban was lifted by on 9 March 2014 following an apology. She was the film producer of The Legend of Inikpi. In October 2019 Okojie had an endorsement deal with Chi Limited's Prime brand, Hollandia Evap Milk. She also became a brand ambassador for Pennek Nigeria Limited, a real estate investment company based in Lagos.

== Filmography ==
Year	Film	Character	Notes
2004	The Maid	Jane	I & II With Clem Ohameze, and Eucharia Anunobi
2004	Into Temptation		With Genevieve Nnaji, Ramsey Nouah, and J.T. Tom West
	House Party		With Olu Jacobs, Jim Lawson, Zack Orji, and Emeka Rollas...
2005	Women in Power	Julia	I & II With Olu Jacobs, Liz Benson and Patience Ozokwor
2005	Lost to Lust	Esther	I & II with Monalisa Chinda and Yemi Blaq
	Kill the Bride	Love	I & II with Rita Dominic and Mike Ezuruonye
2006	Under the Sky	Supriya	I & II with Ramsey Nouah and Mike Ezuruonye
2006	Under Control	Eve	I & II With Nonso Diobi, Yul Edochie, Chinenye Nnebe, and Gentle Jack
	Thanksgiving	Gift	I & II with Clem Ohameze and Eucharia Anunobi
	Sweet Mama	Viola	I & II With John Okafor and Patience Ozokwor
	Dear Mama	Viola	I & II With John Okafor and Patience Ozokwor
	Pay Day		With Mike Ezuruonye
	Painful World	Anny	I & II With Desmond Elliot, Chioma Chukwuka, Ashley Nwosu, Benedict Johnson
	One-Bullet	Juliet	I & II With Bob-Manuel Udokwu, Justice Esiri, and Kelvin Ikeduba
	Oath of a Priest	Kate	With Benedict Johnson and Jim Lawson
	Married to the Enemy	Vera	With Desmond Elliot And Ini Edo
	Last Kiss		With Emeka Ike, Ini Edo, Ejike Asiegbu, and Florence Onuma
	Endless Night		with Ashley Nwosu, Benedict Johnson, and Robert Peters
	Emotional Blunder	Yvone	I & II With Clem Ohameze, Eucharia Anunobi, and Fred Aserome
	19 Macaulay Street		With Tony Umez and Eucharia Anunobi
2007	Wealth Aside		With Nonso Diobi, Jim Lawson, and Yvonne Jegede
2007	Twist of Fate	Buchi	With Desmond Elliot and Eucharia Anunobi
	The Scorpion God	Ihuoma	With Sam Dede, and Ikem Chude
	The Last Tradition		With Kenneth Okonkwo, and Chiwetalu Agu
	Take Me Home	Loveth	With Desmond Elliot and Chiege Alisigwe
	Look Into My Eyes	Loveth	With Desmond Elliot and Chiege Alisigwe
	Sunny My Son	Juliet	With Nonso Diobi, Benedict Johnson, Yul Edochie and Pete Edochie
	My Beloved Son	Juliet	With Nonso Diobi, Benedict Johnson, Yul Edochie, and Pete Edochie
	She is My Sister	Nancy	I & II With Steven Kanumba and Nkiru Sylvanus
	Power of Justice	Nkechi	With Omotola Jalade Ekeinde, Nonso Diobi, Queen Nwokoye
	Kolomental	Anna	With Moses Armstrong
	Keziah	Keziah	I & IV With John Okafor, John Dumelo, MC Smith Ochendo, Eve Esin, and Adaora Ukoh
	Genevieve	Example	
	Evil Agenda	Diane	I & II With Pete Edochie, Patience Ozokwor, Dauda Ogbonna, JohnPaul Nwadike
	Desperate Ladies	Annabel	I & II With Chioma Chukwuka, Oge Okoye, Nonso Diobi, Solomon Akiyesi, and Fred Aseroma
	Crisis in Paradise	Kella	I & II With Kalu Ikeagwu, Ini Edo, Mike Ezuruonye, and Tonto Dikeh
	Breath of Anger	Chiaku	with Mike Ezuruonye, and Tchidi Chikere
	Area Mama	Adanne	With Patience Ozokwor and Eucharia Anunobi
	Tiger King	Akwaugo	with Nonso Diobi, Chinwe Owoh and Pete Edochie
2008	The Gods Are Wise	Adaugo	with Nonso Diobi
2008	Temple of Justice	Nkechi	with Nonso Diobi and Omotola Jalade Ekeinde
	Tell Me Why	Jovita	With Tony Umez, Ngozi Ezeonu, and Benedict Johnson
	Soul Of A Maiden	Nuria	with Ini Edo and Mike Ezuruonye
	Strength to Strength	Jane	I & II with Patience Ozokwor, Mike Ezuruonye and Tonto Dikeh
	Sin No More	Bridget	I & II with Kanayo O. Kanayo, Patience Ozokwor and Halima Abubakar
	Live to Remember	Buchi	I & II with Ini Edo and Mike Ezuruonye
	Kiss My Pain	Mai	With Mike Ezuruonye And Yul Edochie
2008	Forest of Promises	Police Inspector Bisi	I & II with Mike Ezuruonye, and Charles Okafor
2008	Don't Wanna Be a Player	Monalisa	I & II with Ini Edo, Jim Iyke and Mike Ezuruonye
2008	Corporate Maid	Rose	I & II With Oge Okoye, Van Vicker, Ngozi Ezeonu
2008	Act of Faith	Uche	I & II with Patience Ozokwor and Mike Ezuruonye
2009	Tears of Hope	Olamma	I & II with Olu Jacobs, Van Vicker and Ngozi Ezeonu
2009	Royal Tears	Olamma	I & II with Olu Jacobs, Van Vicker and Ngozi Ezeonu
2009	Sound of Pain	Amarachi	I & II With Van Vicker, Olu Jacobs, and Clarion Chukwura,
2009	Guilty Pleasure	Boma	I & II With Desmond Elliot, Ramsey Nouah, Nse Ikpe‑Etim, Majid Michel, and Omoni Oboli
2009	Sexy Girls	Zita	with Nonso Diobi, Onny Michaels, Uche Ogbodo
2009	Heat of the Moment	Anna	with Emeka Ike, Kofi Adjorlolo, and Vitalis Ndubuisi
2009	Entanglement	Chidera	I - IV with Uche Jombo, Desmond Elliot and Yemi Blaq
2009	Clash of Twins	Mildred / Melisa	I & II With Mike Ezuruonye and Rama Brew
2009	Beyond Desire	Anne	with Nonso Diobi
2009	A Weeping Soul		
2010	A Cry for Justice	Ella	I & II With Mike Ezuruonye, Jackie Appiah, Chacha Eke
2011	White Chapel	Judith	With Van Vicker and Nkem Owoh
2011	Where Money Sleep	Egede	With Frank Artus, Rita Dominic, and Nuella Njubigbo
2011	Weeping Soul	Grace	I & II With Kenneth Okonkwo, Mike Godson, and Vitalis Ndubuisi
2011	The Seekers	Judith	I & II With Olu Jacobs, Chika Ike, Annie Idibia, Halima Abubakar, Rukky Sanda
2011	The Code	Susan	With Muna Obiekwe, and Angela Okorie
2011	Secret Code	Susan	With Muna Obiekwe and Angela Okorie
2011	Thanks for Coming	Frieda	With Yul Edochie and Angela Okorie
2011	Gallant Babes	Frieda	With Yul Edochie and Angela Okorie
2011	Mirror of Life	Nneka	I & II With John Dumelo, Queen Nwokoye
2011	End of Mirror of Life	Nneka	I & II With John Dumelo, Queen Nwokoye
2011	Jewels of the Sun	Nneka	I & II With Mike Ezuruonye, Emeka Ike, Browny Igboegwu
2011	Heart of a Widow	June	I & II With Frank Artus, Kenneth Okonkwo, and Angela Okorie
2011	Heart of a Fighter	Dubem	I &II With Ruth Kadiri, Ramsey Nouah, Enebeli Elebuwa
2011	Painful Victory	Chinenye	I & II With Ken Erics, Ngozi Ezeonu, Vitalis Ndubusi, and Chinwe Owoh
2012	World of the Mind	Example	With Yul Edochie and Patience Ozokwor
2012	My World	Nancy	With Yul Edochie and Patience Ozokwor
2012	Mercy the Bus Driver	Ada	With Ruth Kadiri, Prince Eke, Oge Okoye
2012	Heart of a Saint	Chidi	I &II With Kenneth Okonkwo
2012	Sins of the Past	Wendy	I & II With Frank Artus, and Mary Remmy Njoku
2012	Hand of Fate	Wendy	I & II With Frank Artus and Mary Remmy Njoku
2012	Brave Mind	Wendy	I & II With Frank Artus and Mary Remmy Njoku
2012	Deep Water	Erica	I & II With Yul Edochie, Patience Ozokwor, and Eve Esin
2012	The Enemy I See	Erica	I & II With Yul Edochie, Patience Ozokwor, and Eve Esin
2012	Power Of A Kiss	Sherry	I & II With Jim Iyke, Olu Jacobs, John Dumelo
2013	Baby Oku In America	Baby Oku	I & II With Chet Anekwe, and Uche Ebere
2014	Hustlers	Vicky	with Nse Ikpe Etim, Clarion chukwura Abiola and Ik Ogbonna
2014	Bloody Ring	Nmaku	with Chiwetalu Agu, Alex Ejimofo and Nneka Emmanuel
2014	Bleeding Crown	Amanda	with Judith Iwu, Paul Sambo and TT.Templee
2015	Thy Will Be Done	Lucy	With Ramsey Nouah and Mary Remmy Njoku
2016	Light Will Come	Viola	With Majid Michel, Shaffy Bello, and Afeez Oyetoro
2017	16th Anniversary	Adaora	With Tony Umez, Eucharia Anunobi, and Jemima Osunde
2018	Seven & A Half Dates	Bisola	With Toyin Aimakhu, Ali Nuhu, Ken Erics, Jim Iyke, Sola Sobawale, and Akin Lewis
2019	Mmasi: The Arrogant Preacher		With Chiwetalu Agu
2020	The New Normal	Jadesola	Directed by Teniola Olatoni
2020	The Legend of Inikpi	Queen Omele	With Sam Dede
2021	A Naija Christmas	Mrs. Bliss (Sammy)	With Rachel Oniga, Abayomi Alvin, Efa Iwara and Kunle Remi
2022	Battle On Buka Street	Awele	Earned AMVCA nomination
2022	Passport	Kopiko	Earned AMVCA nomination
2023	Something Like Gold	Aunty Mayowa	With Timini Egbuson, Segun Arinze and Kunle Remi
2024	House 45	Lady Flora	With Jackie Appiah, Chike Daniels
2024	Ejiro's Wish	Ejiro	With Regina Daniels

== Awards and nominations ==
Year	Event	Prize	Recipient	Result
2009	5th Africa Movie Academy Awards	Best Actress in a Supporting Role	Live To Remember	Won
2009	2009 Best of Nollywood Awards	Best Supporting Actress	Live To Remember	Won
2009	2009 Nigeria Entertainment Awards	Best Actress	Herself	Nominated
2010	2010 Best of Nollywood Awards	Best Supporting Actress	The Maidens	Nominated
2010	2010 Ghana Movie Awards	Best Actress -West Collaboration	Shakira	Nominated
2011	2011 Nigeria Entertainment Awards	Best Actress	Heart of a Widow	Nominated
2011	2011 Ghana Movie Awards	Best Actress Africa Collaboration	My Husband's Funeral	Nominated
2012	2012 Nollywood Movies Awards	Best Actress In Leading Role	Weeping Soul	Won
2012	2012 Nigeria Entertainment Awards	Best Actress	Facebook Babes	Nominated
2012	2012 Ghana Movie Awards	Best Actress Africa Collaboration	Wild Target	Nominated
2012	2012 Golden Icons Academy Movie Awards	Best Actress- Viewers Choice	Herself	Nominated
2013	2013 Nollywood Movies Awards	Best Actress In Leading Role	Dumebi	Nominated
2013	2013 Africa Magic Viewers Choice Awards	Best Actress in Comedy	Dumebi The Dirty Girl	Won
2014	2014 Best of Nollywood Awards	Best Supporting Actress	Hustlers	Nominated
2014	2014 Golden Icons Academy Movie Awards	Best Comedic Act	Hustlers	Nominated
2014	2014 Golden Icons Academy Movie Awards	Best Actress -Viewers Choice	Herself	Nominated
2014	2014 Nollywood Movies Awards	Best Lead Actress	Hustlers	Nominated
2014	2014 Nollywood Movies Awards	Popular Choice-Female	Herself	Won
2015	2015 Ghana Movie Awards	Best Actress -Africa Collaboration	30 Days in Atlanta	Nominated
2018	2018 Eloy Awards	Actress Of The Year	Seven & A Half Dates	Won
2022	Africa Magic Viewers' Choice Awards	Best Supporting Actress	The New Normal	Nominated
2023	Africa Magic Viewers' Choice Awards	Best Actress In A Comedy/TV Series	Battle on Buka Street	Nominated
2023	Africa Magic Viewers' Choice Awards	Best Actress In A Comedy/TV Series	Passport	Nominated

== See also ==
- List of Nigerian actresses
