= Osita Iheme =

Nigerian actor (born 1982)

Osita Iheme MFR
- Iheme at the 2014 Africa Magic Viewers Choice Awards
- Born: 20 February 1982 (age 44); Abia State, Nigeria
- Other name: Pawpaw
- Education: Bachelor of Science
- Alma mater: Lagos State University
- Occupations: Actor; Producer; Comedian
- Years active: 1998— present
- Known for: Aki na Ukwa
- Parents: Herbert Iheme (father); Augustina Iheme (mother)
- Awards: Africa Movie Academy Award for Lifetime Achievement (2007)
- Honours: Order of the Federal Republic

Osita Iheme MFR (//; born 20 February 1982) popularly known as Pawpaw, is a Nigerian actor, author, film producer, and comedian. He is widely regarded as one of the greatest comedic actors in the history of Nollywood. Recognized for his physical stature, mischievous characterization, and idiosyncratic comedic timing, he became one of the most indelible figures of the industry's home-video era. He is best known for his iconic role as Pawpaw in Aki na Ukwa (2002) alongside Chinedu Ikedieze. Since then, he has starred in several Nollywood productions, including 2 Rats (2003), Baby Police (2003), Nollywood Babylon (2008), The Mirror Boy (2011), Christmas in Miami, and Aki and Pawpaw (2021). Iheme subsequently became one of the most recognizable Nollywood figures in global internet and meme culture, with his expressions and mannerisms widely trending through memes and social media. The phenomenon expanded his international profile and earned him a worldwide cult following. Iheme was the recipient of the 2007 Africa Movie Academy Award for Lifetime Achievement and was conferred Order of the Federal Republic (MFR), a federal honour by President Goodluck Jonathan in 2011.

== Early life ==
=== Birth and education ===
Iheme was born on 20 February 1982 in Abia State, located in the southeastern region of Nigeria, although a native of Mbaitoli, Imo State, southeast Nigeria, to a family of five with parents Herbert and Augustina Iheme. He had his MBA from the Institute of Management Technology, Ghaziabad (IMT). After his education, he began acting in 1998, where he acted initially in a featured role.

== Career ==
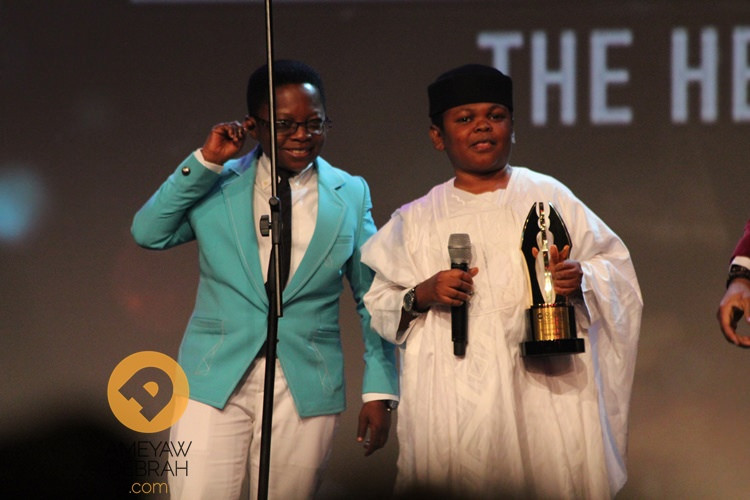
Iheme and Chinedu Ikedieze

Iheme was often typecast in the role of a child in various films. He rose to prominence after starring as Pawpaw with Chinedu Ikedieze in Aki na Ukwa (2002). He became the ambassador of TAJBank in 2023. He plans to run for a political office in the future.

== Personal life ==
Gunmen killed Prince Iheme, the elder brother to Osita, in Owerri, Imo State, in 2022.

== Legacy and influence ==
To reward his contribution towards comedy genre movies in the Nigerian Film Industry, in 2011 he was awarded the Nigerian National Honor of Member of the Order of the Federal Republic (MFR) by President Goodluck Jonathan. In 2007, he was given the Lifetime Achievement award by AMAA (African Movie Academy Awards).

Osita Iheme's performance alongside fellow actor and his longtime friend Chinedu Ikedieze in the 2002 film Aki na Ukwa is still widely spoken about, and the duo, especially Osita's character, has been on-screen trending through memes since 2019 on Twitter and other social media platforms. This eventually earned him a global fanbase.

== Filmography ==
Year	Film	Role	Notes
2002	Aka Gum	Chidi	with Chinedu Ikedieze
2002	Aki na ukwa	Pawpaw	with Chinedu Ikedieze
2002	Okwu na uka		with Chinedu Ikedieze & Patience Ozokwor
2003	2 Rats		with Chinedu Ikedieze, Patience Ozokwor and Amaechi Muonagor
2003	Baby Police	Dada	with Okey Billy Boniface
2003	Back from America	Risky	with Chinedu Ikedieze and Rita Dominic
2003	Charge & Bail	Uzochukwu	with Chinedu Ikedieze
2003	Good Mother		with Amaechi Muonagor
2003	Green Snake	Akpuruka	with Nkiru Sylvanus
2003	I, Not Stupid		with Sam Loco Efe
2003	I'm in Love	Osuondu	with Chinedu Ikedieze
2003	Informant		with John Okafor
2003	John and Johnny Just Come		
2003	Johnny Just Come	Johnson	with Sam Loco Efe
2003	Lagos Boys		with Chinedu Ikedieze
2003	Local Champion		with Chinedu Ikedieze
2003	Nicodemus		with John Okafor
2003	Nwa Teacher	Azigo	with Chinedu Ikedieze
2003	Oke Belgium	Kekere	
2003	Onunaeyi: Seeds of Bondage		with Pete Edochie, Chinedu Ikedieze, Patience Ozokwor & Clem Ohameze
2003	Pipiro		with Chinedu Ikedieze
2003	Show Bobo: The American Boys	Ikem	with Chinedu Ikedieze
2003	School Dropouts	Ejiofor	with Chinedu Ikedieze
2003	Tell Them		with Sola Fosudo
2003	The Tom and Jerry	Jerry	with Chinedu Ikedieze
2004	American Husband		with Amaechi Muonagor
2004	Big Daddies		with Chinedu Ikedieze
2004	Columbia Connection		
2004	Mr. Ibu	Muo	with John Okafor
2004	Not by Height		with Chinedu Ikedieze
2004	Sunday School Children		with Chinedu Ikedieze
2005	Colours of Emotion	Spark	with Chinedu Ikedieze
2005	Final World Cup		with Chinedu Ikedieze
2005	Holy Diamond	Ikenna	with Happiness Adibe
2005	I Think Twice	Obinna	with Chinedu Ikedieze
2005	The Last Orphan		
2005	My Business		with Chiwetalu Agu
2005	One Good Turn		with Chinedu Ikedieze
2005	Reggae Boys		with Chinedu Ikedieze
2005	Secret Adventure		with Chinedu Ikedieze
2005	Spoiler		with Chinedu Ikedieze
2005	Twin Brothers		with Sam Loco Efe
2005	Village Boys		with Chinedu Ikedieze
2006	African Tallest Men		with Chinedu Ikedieze
2006	Big Thief Small Thief		with Amaechi Muonagor
2006	Blessed Son		with Chinedu Ikedieze
2006	Boys from Holland	Pablo	with Chinedu Ikedieze
2006	Brain Box		with Chinedu Ikedieze, Kanayo O. Kanayo & Sam Loco Efe
2006	Brain Masters	Ike	with Chinedu Ikedieze
2006	Cat & Rat	Kalu	with Chinedu Ikedieze
2006	Criminal Law	Chris	with Chinedu Ikedieze
2006	Jadon	Prince Jadon	with Chinedu Ikedieze
2006	Kadura		with Chinedu Ikedieze
2006	Last Challenge		with Kanayo O. Kanayo & Chinedu Ikedieze
2006	Magic Cap	Anya	with Chinedu Ikedieze
2006	Remote Control	Ichie Okwubanego	with Nora Amah
2006	Royal Messengers		with Chinedu Ikedieze
2006	Sweet Money		with Chinedu Ikedieze
2006	'U' General		with Chinedu Ikedieze & Patience Ozokwor
2006	Winning Your Love		with Chinedu Ikedieze & Patience Ozokwor
2006	Young Masters		with Chinedu Ikedieze
2007	Thunder Storm		with Chinedu Ikedieze
2007	Stubborn Flies	Sambro	with Chinedu Ikedieze
2007	Spirit of a Prophet		with Chinedu Ikedieze & Clem Ohameze
2007	Powerful Civilian	Joe	with Chinedu Ikedieze & Victor Osuagwu
2007	Power as of Old	Cheche	with Chinedu Ikedieze & Clem Ohameze
2007	Escape to Destiny		with Chinedu Ikedieze
2007	Cain & Abel		with Chinedu Ikedieze
2007	Village Destroyers	Acho	with Chinedu Ikedieze and Kenneth Okonkwo
2008	Daddy Must Obey		with Chinedu Ikedieze
2008	Intelligent Students	Santos	with Chinedu Ikedieze and Sam Loco Efe
2008	Markus D Millionaire		with Chinedu Ikedieze
2009	Onye Obioma		with Chinedu Ikedieze
2010	Loyal Enemies	Meshark	with Chinedu Ikedieze and Van Vicker
2011	Ben Ten		with Chinedu Ikedieze
2011	Love for the Kids		followed by Another Love; with Chinedu Ikedieze
2011	Another Love		sequel to Love for the Kids; with Chinedu Ikedieze
2011	The Mirror Boy	Mirror Boy	with Genevieve Nnaji
2011	Yellow Sisi		with Chinedu Ikedieze
2012	Kingdom on Earth		with John Dumelo
2012	Village Rascals	Popo	with Chinedu Ikedieze
2013	Double Mama	Arusi	with Chiwetalu Agu
2013	The Fighter		with Chinedu Ikedieze and Funke Akindele
2013	Terrible Twos		with Chinedu Ikedieze
2014	Bomboy		followed by Osuofia the Boxer; with Nkem Owoh
2014	Osuofia the Boxer		sequel to Bomboy; with Nkem Owoh
2014	Pawpaw the Guitar Boy		with Chiwetalu Agu
2015	Two Sons of Ali		with Chinedu Ikedieze
2016	The Twin Sisters		with Chinedu Ikedieze
2017	Celebrity Marriage		
2017	The Self-Destruction of Little Mark		
2018	Ada My Love		
2018	Games Men Play 5: Computer Games Is Our Game		
2018	Too Much Money		with Chinedu Ikedieze
2019	Babysitter	Sabinus	with Emma Ayalogu
2021	Aki and Pawpaw	Pawpaw	with Chinedu Ikedieze
2021	Fatty and Sons Autos	Aki	With Chinedu Ikedieze, Muyiwa Adegoke
2021	Christmas in Miami	Raphael	With Ayo Makun, Richard Mofe-Damijo
2023	Welcome to Africa		
2023	Sabinus the Best Man	Don Little	With Tobi Bakre, Sophia Chisom
2024	The Odds		With Kelechi Udegbe
unknown	House Boys for Sale		with Patience Ozokwor and Chinedu Ikedieze
