= Chinedu Ikedieze =

Nigerian actor, entrepreneur and investor (born 1977)

Chinedu Ikedieze MFR
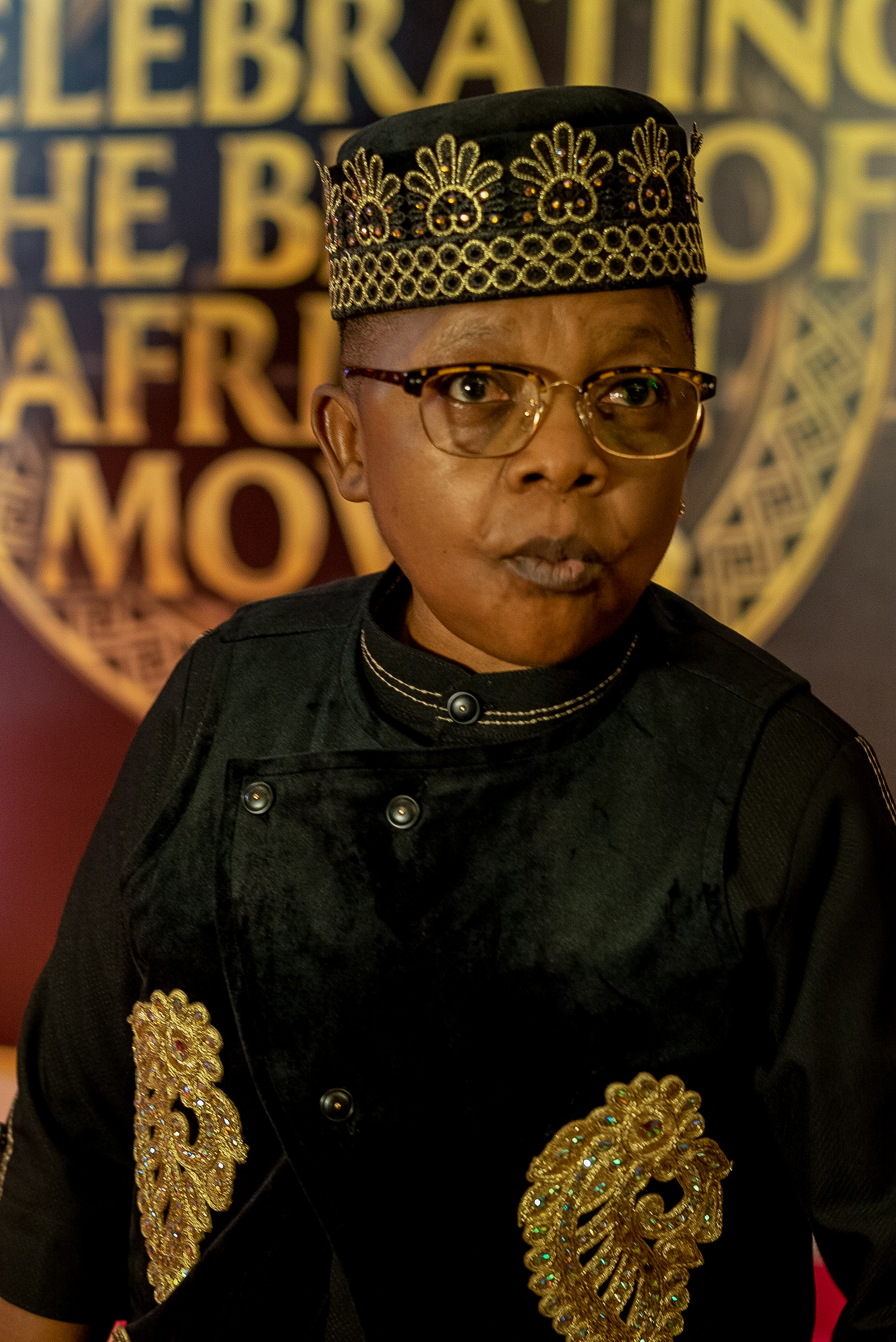
- Ikedieze at the 2021 Africa Movie Academy Awards
- Born: 12 December 1977 (age 48); Iluoma Uzuakoli, Bende, Abia State, Nigeria
- Other name: Aki
- Education: New York Film Academy; Institute of Management and Technology
- Occupation: Actor
- Years active: 1998–present
- Known for: Aki na Ukwa
- Spouse: Nneoma Ikedieze (m. 2011)

Chinedu Ikedieze// , MFR (born 12 December 1977) is a Nollywood actor, entrepreneur and investor. He is best known for playing alongside Osita Iheme in the 2002 film Aki na Ukwa. He has featured in over 150 films in a career spanning over 22 years. He has acted in the role of a kid in most of his films during his early career due to his stature and physical appearance. He is known as Aki for his performance in the film Aki na Ukwa. In 2011, he married a fashion designer, Nneoma Nwaijah, and the couple had their first child in 2012. They have 2 daughters and a son.

== Education ==
Chinedu completed his primary and secondary education in Aba, Abia State. After completing his secondary education, he earned a Higher National Diploma (HND) in Theatre Arts and a degree in Mass Communication from the Institute of Management and Technology, Enugu (IMT). After completing his studies at IMT, he initially wanted to become a lawyer but pursued a career in film acting in 1998 and initially featured in lesser roles. He first acted in a minor role in the 1998 film Evil Men. He enrolled in the prestigious New York Film Academy in 2004.

=== Collaboration with Osita Iheme ===
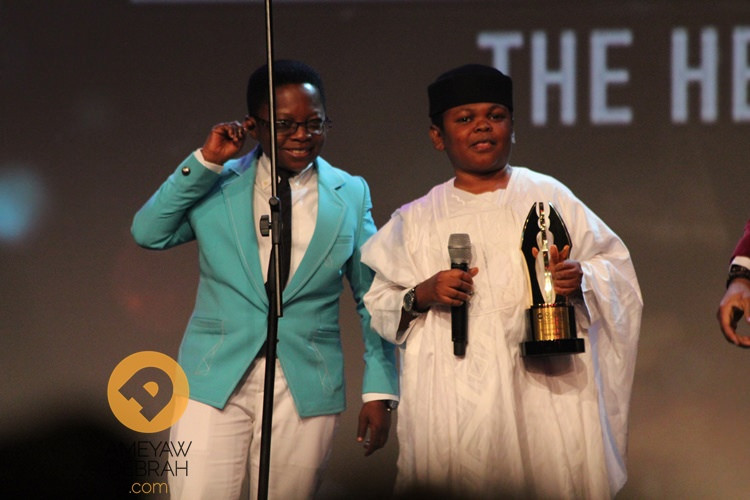
Aki and Paw Paw

He entered the Nollywood industry in 1998 and rose to recognition in a Nigerian film he acted in 2002, Aki na Ukwa, where he played the breakthrough role of Aki alongside another little person actor, Osita Iheme. This created a bond between them. The duo were popularly identified as "Aki and Paw Paw" since the release of the film in 2002, and ever since, they have both featured together in several films, taking the lead roles in those movies. Both Chinedu and Osita have been maintaining onscreen and offscreen chemistry, which is widely praised by the Nollywood fraternity. Chinedu and Osita collectively established Aki and Pawpaw Entertainment. They also own the Aki n Paw Child Care Foundation.

== Honours ==
In 2007, Ikedieze received the Lifetime Achievement Award at the Africa Movie Academy Awards. He was also honored with the Order of the Federal Republic which was given by the then Nigerian President Goodluck Jonathan for his contributions to Nollywood and to the economic growth of the country.

In 2018, he was honored in Miami, Florida in the United States of America as a distinguished visitor to the city of Miami, Florida. In appreciation, he said “From the bottom of my heart I say thank you to Miami-Dade, the country office of the mayor, and the county commissioners for honoring me as a distinguished visitor to the city of Miami, Florida. You have just given me a key to more success in life. He therefore encouraged all to believe in themselves if the world believes in them.

== Legacy ==
His performance alongside fellow little person actor Osita Iheme in the 2002 film Aki na Ukwa is still widely spoken of, and the duo, especially Osita's character, has been trending through memes since 2019 in Twitter and other social media platforms globally. Osita is listed as one of the richest actors in Nigeria. Chinedu praises Kasvid, the late film producer for investing in him and Osita.

== Filmography ==
Year	Film	Role	Notes
2002	Aki na ukwa	Aki	with Osita Iheme
2002	Spanner: The Humble Servant	Spanner	with Nkem Owoh
2002	Okwu na uka		with Osita Iheme & Patience Ozokwor
2002	Aka Gum	Chisom	with Osita Iheme
2003	The Tom and Jerry	Tom	with Osita Iheme
2003	The Catechist		with John Okafor
2003	Show Bobo: The American Boys	Kizzito	with Osita Iheme
2003	School Dropouts	Ikenna	with Osita Iheme
2003	Pipiro		with Osita Iheme
2003	Onunaeyi: Seeds of Bondage		with Pete Edochie, Osita Iheme, Patience Ozokwor & Clem Ohameze
2003	Lagos Boys		with Osita Iheme
2003	Family Crisis		
2003	Charge & Bail	Uzodinma	with Osita Iheme
2003	Back from America		with Rita Dominic
2003	I'm in Love	Gabriel	with Osita Iheme
2003	Local Champion		with Osita Iheme
2003	Akpu-Nku		
2003	2 Rats		with Osita Iheme, Patience Ozokwor and Amaechi Muonagor
2003	Nwa Teacher	Jaja	with Osita Iheme
2004	Across the Niger		with Pete Edochie, Kanayo O. Kanayo & Ramsey Nouah
2004	Big Daddies		with Osita Iheme
2004	Igbo Made	Doctor Micah	
2004	Not by Height		with Osita Iheme
2004	Spanner Goes to Jail	Spanner	with Nkem Owoh
2004	Spanner in Battle of Supremacy	Spanner	with Nkem Owoh
2004	Sunday School Children		with Osita Iheme
2005	Village Boys		with Osita Iheme
2005	Spoiler	Peter	with Osita Iheme
2005	Secret Adventure		with Osita Iheme
2005	Reggae Boys		with Osita Iheme
2005	One Good Turn		with Osita Iheme
2005	I Think Twice	Ike	with Osita Iheme
2005	Final World Cup		with Osita Iheme
2005	Colours of Emotion	Ebony	with Osita Iheme
2006	African Tallest Men		with Osita Iheme
2006	Young Masters		with Osita Iheme
2006	Winning Your Love		with Osita Iheme & Patience Ozokwor
2006	'U' General		with Osita Iheme & Patience Ozokwor
2006	Sweet Money		with Osita Iheme
2006	Royal Messengers		with Osita Iheme
2006	Magic Cap	Aba	with Osita Iheme
2006	Last Challenge		with Kanayo O. Kanayo & Osita Iheme
2006	Kadura		with Osita Iheme
2006	Jadon	Jack	with Osita Iheme
2006	Games Men Play		with Chioma Chukwuka, Kate Henshaw-Nuttal, Ini Edo, Mike Ezuruonye & Jim Iyke
2006	Criminal Law	Hippo	with Osita Iheme
2006	Brain Masters	Chima	with Osita Iheme
2006	Brain Box		with Osita Iheme, Kanayo O. Kanayo & Sam Loco Efe
2006	Boys from Holland	Lincoln	with Osita Iheme
2006	Blessed Son		with Osita Iheme
2006	Cat & Rat	Ogbu	with Osita Iheme
2007	Thunder Storm		with Osita Iheme
2007	Stubborn Flies	Angel	with Osita Iheme
2007	Spirit of a Prophet		with Osita Iheme & Clem Ohameze
2007	Powerful Civilian	Richie	with Osita Iheme & Victor Osuagwu
2007	Power as of Old	Katanga	with Osita Iheme & Clem Ohameze
2007	Escape to Destiny		with Osita Iheme
2007	Cain & Abel		with Osita Iheme
2007	Village Destroyers	Azu	with Osita Iheme and Kenneth Okonkwo
2008	Daddy Must Obey	Aki	with Osita Iheme
2008	Intelligent Students	Pererer	with Osita Iheme and Sam Loco Efe
2008	Markus D Millionaire		with Osita Iheme
2009	Onye Obioma		with Osita Iheme
2010	Loyal Enemies	Shedrack	with Osita Iheme and Van Vicker
2011	Ben Ten		with Osita Iheme
2011	Love for the Kids		followed by Another Love; with Osita Iheme
2011	Another Love		sequel to Love for the Kids; with Osita Iheme
2011	Yellow Sisi		with Osita Iheme
2012	Village Rascals	Aki	with Osita Iheme
2013	The Fighter		with Osita Iheme and Funke Akindele
2013	Terrible Twos		with Osita Iheme
2015	Two Sons of Ali		with Osita Iheme
2015	The First Lady	Small Kenechi	With Omoni Oboli, Alexx Ekubo, Joseph Benjamin
2016	The Twin Sisters		with Osita Iheme
2018	Too Much Money		with Osita Iheme
2018	Lara and the Beat	Big Chi	With Ademola Adedoyin, Chioma Chukwuka Akpotha, Kemi Lala Akindoju
2020	Dear Affy	Street Child	With Toyin Abraham, Seilat Adebowale, Bimbo Ademoye
2021	Aki and Pawpaw	Aki	with Osita Iheme
2021	The Ghost and the Tout Too	Chief Aki	With Ayomide Abayode, Anthony Abraham, Alexander Abolore
unknown	House Boys for Sale		with Patience Ozokwor and Osita Iheme
2022	Palava!	Big T	With Mercy Aigbe, Bisola Aiyeola, Neo Akpofure
2023	Love Me for Me	Raymond	with Amaechi Anaekwe, Grace Anga

== Awards and nominations ==
Year	Award	Category	Film	Result	Ref
2023	Africa Magic Viewers' Choice Awards	Best Actor In A Comedy Drama, Movie Or TV Series	Aki & PawPaw	Nominated	

== Television ==
- The Johnsons as Efetobore Johnson, produced by Rogers Ofime
