= Nkem Owoh =

Nigerian actor and comedian (born 1960)

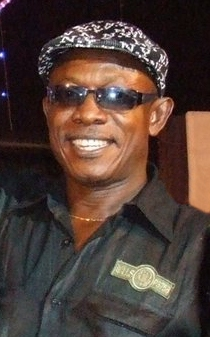
- Nkem Owoh at the Africa Movie Academy Awards in Bayelsa State, Nigeria, 2008
- Born: Nkem Owoh; 7 February 1958 (age 68); Amagu, Udi Town, Eastern Region Enugu State, Nigeria
- Other names: Nwabuoku, Osuofia
- Education: Federal University of Agriculture, Abeokuta University of Ilorin
- Occupation: Actor
- Years active: 1979–present
- Spouse: Ngozi Owoh

Nkem Owoh (born 7 February 1958) is a Nigerian actor, comedian and singer. In 2008, he won the Africa Movie Academy Award for "Best Actor in a Leading Role" for his role in the Nigerian film, Stronger than Pain.

== Early life and education ==
Nkem Owoh was born in Enugu State, Nigeria. After completing his primary and secondary education in Nsukka, he went on to study engineering at the Federal University of Agriculture, Abeokuta. During his university studies, Owoh began acting in various television and film productions.

== Career ==
Owoh developed a strong interest in performing arts from an early age, which persisted through primary, secondary, and university education. Although he studied engineering, his heart belonged to creative expression through acting, writing, and singing. After completing his national youth service, he joined WACO Engineering but was laid off after just one year. However, this incident turned out to be a blessing in disguise, as it paved the way for him to explore opportunities in radio and television production.

In 1979, he embarked on his journey in the entertainment industry, starting as a writer at Nigerian Television Authority (NTA). He further established his writing credentials by penning scripts for notable productions, such as: The New Masquerade and Basi and Company (a sitcom created by Ken Saro-Wiwa). He also once filled in for an absent actor, playing the role of a drunkard in the groundbreaking sitcom The New Masquerade. This unexpected opportunity launched his successful career.

However, Owoh ventured into the movie scene when he was contracted to handle the subtitling for the Igbo language movie Living in Bondage upon its completion. Following the success of Living in Bondage, acting opportunities began to flood in. A year later, he landed his next significant role as a customs officer in the Igbo language movie Circle of Doom. His good performance announced his arrival on the scene, captivating producers who not only sought him for his acting talent but also valued his scriptwriting skills. Following Circle of Doom, he landed his third film role in Taboo which he was also among the scriptwriters.

In 1995, Owoh wrote and produced the iconic film Ikuku, where he portrayed the unforgettable character, Osuofia (a drunk). His portrayal of Osuofia in the movie earned him widespread recognition, transforming him into a beloved household name. In 1997, he produced Ikuku 2, a sequel to the first movie, where he reprised his role as a drunkard. He also produced Pampam the same year, teaming up with Okey Bakassi.

The character Osuofia was once again brought to life by Owoh in Osuofia in London (2003) and its sequel, Osuofia in London 2 (2004), produced by Kingsley Ogoro. His appearance in this movie earned him international recognition and also his nickname. This breakthrough paved the way for a lasting career, with continuous screen appearances from then on.

Owoh is also known for performing the song "I Go Chop Your Dollar" about advance fee fraud. The song was featured in the film The Master in which Owoh plays the role of a scammer. The Nigerian Broadcasting Commission later banned the song. In 2007, Owoh was arrested in Amsterdam, Netherlands as a result of a seven-month investigation by the Dutch police dubbed "Operation Apollo". Owoh was arrested while performing a musical show when the police raided the event and arrested 111 people on suspicion of lottery fraud and immigration violations. Owoh was later released.

In November 2009, Owoh was kidnapped in eastern Nigeria. His kidnappers demanded a 15 million naira ransom. Owoh was released after his family members allegedly paid a ransom fee of 1.4 million naira.

In 2026, Owoh starred in the Dammy Twitch-directed romantic comedy Call of My Life alongside Uzoamaka Power and Patience Ozokwor. The film earned 628 million Naira within 6 weeks of release and entered the list of Nollywood's Highest-grossing Films.

== Personal life ==
Owoh and his wife, Ngozi Nkem Owoh, have been married since 1998. She hails from Amagu Village, Udi Town, Enugu State, Nigeria. Owoh prefers to keep the identity of his children away from the public. He has two daughters. He lost one of his two daughters in June 2023.

== Awards and endorsements ==
In 2008, he received the prestigious Africa Movie Academy Award (AMAA) for "Best Actor in a Leading Role" for his outstanding performance in the Nigerian film Stronger than Pain.

In 2017, he was honored with the prestigious Africa Movie Academy Award (AMAA) Lifetime Achievement Award at the 13th edition of the ceremony.

MTN partnered with Owoh in 2012, signing him to a multimillion-naira endorsement deal that has been repeatedly renewed.

== Filmography ==
Year	Film	Role	Notes
1987	Things Fall Apart	Towncrier	with Pete Edochie
1993	Circle of Doom 2		with Kanayo O. Kanayo
1995	Frame Up		writer and director only; with Tobechukwu Anadi and Ngozi Nwaneto
1995	Rattlesnake	Odinaka	with Francis Duru
1997	Blood Vapour	Lambert	with Hilda Dokubo
1997	Pam Pam: From the Adventure of Lokko and Mambo		with Charley Boy Oputa and Jide Kosoko
1998	Yogo Pam Pam		sequel to Pam Pam; with Okey Mac Anthony
1999	Big Man...Big Trouble		
1999	Crisis		with Sandra Achums
1999	Sawam		with Francis Agu
1999	Conspiracy		with Onyeka Onwenu
2001	The Eliminators		with Clem Ohameze
2001	Ode-eshi	Ekpechi	with Sam Loco Efe
2001	Onye-Eze	Onye-Eze	
2001	Ukwa	Ukwa	with Patience Ozokwor and Amaechi Muonagor
2002	Fake Doctor	Dr. Zebedi	
2002	Ifeonye Metalu	Obioma	
2002	Long John	Long John	with Sam Loco Efe
2002	Police Officer	Sergeant Lucas	
2002	Spanner: The Humble Servant	Jacob	with Chinedu Ikedieze
2002	Stupid!	Kolo	with Okey Bakassi and Jide Kosoko
2003	Anunuebe	Anunuebe	
2003	Calculator: The Only Wise Man	Nobert	with Fabian Adibe
2003	Deceivers	Parlez Vous	With John Okafor, Charles Inojie, Uche Ogbodo
2003	King of the Forest	Utobo	
2003	Lion Finger	Ebube	
2003	Mr. Trouble	Nsogbu	with Patience Ozokwor
2003	Osuofia in London	Osuofia	
2003	Police Recruit		
2004	America Visa	Titus	
2004	My Driver		
2004	My Own Share	Ezeani	
2004	Osuofia in London 2	Osuofia	
2004	Spanner Goes to Jail	Jacob	with Chinedu Ikedieze
2004	Spanner in Battle of Supremacy	Jacob	with Chinedu Ikedieze
2004	The Master	Osuofia	with Kanayo O. Kanayo
2005	Akanchawa	Anayo	
2005	Bus Driver	Jimmy	with Dakore Egbuson
2005	The Prince	Nwadike	
2006	The Barrister	Athanasius	with Ekwi Onwudiwe
2006	Big Man Brother	Bona	with Clem Ohameze; parts 3-4 of De Prof
2006	Captain	Nsofor/Captain	
2006	De Prof	Bona	with Clem Ohameze; followed by Big Man Brother
2006	A Fool at 40	Hygenius	
2006	Foreign Base	Ifeatu	
2006	Indemnity	Egbentu	
2006	Made in Cambridge	Professor Ifeatu Izwe	with Funmi Holder
2006	My Kingdom Come		
2006	The Dreamer	Ikpeazu	
2007	Battle of Indemnity	Egbentu	
2007	Covenant Keeping God	Samuel	
2007	Fire in the Word	Ijiji	
2007	He Nanny		with Andy Chukwu
2007	Johnbull & Rosekate	Johnbull	
2007	Persecution	Ijiji	
2007	Stronger Than Pain	Ulonna	with Kate Henshaw-Nuttal; Owoh's performance in this film earned him the Best Actor in a Leading Role award at the Africa Movie Academy Awards in 2008
2007	Yellow Fever	Sergeant Anwuru	with Charles Awurum
2008	Onye oma CY	CY	with Pamela Mrekpe
2008	His Holiness	Onyabo	
2008	His Last Action	Rev. Czar	
2008	Osuofia and the Wise Men	Osuofia	with Sam Loco Efe
2008	Wonderful Man		
2009	Agaba	Agaba	with Victor Osuagwu
2009	Osuofia Papa Africa	Osuofia	with Nkiru Sylvanus
2010	FIFA Agent		with Charles Awurum
2010	My Inlaw	Mazi Joe	with Clem Ohameze
2010	Enemies of Progress		with Amaechi Muonagor, Judith Iwu
2010	True Story (Be Careful What You Wish For)	Papi	with Ini Edo
2011	Ijele's Wife	Ogbensiegbe	with Tonto Dikeh
2011	Old Fools	Aka	with Sam Loco Efe; parts 3-4 of Senior Servant
2011	Senior Servant	Aka	with Sam Loco Efe; followed by Old Fools
2011	Taxi Driver	Okonkwo	with Uche Ogbodo
2011	Wisdom of Thomas	Thomas	with Funke Akindele
2012	The Abductor		sequel to Boy George; with Mercy Johnson
2012	Boy George		followed by The Abductor; with Mercy Johnson
2012	Holy Life		with Ella Njubuigbo, Rachael Okonkwo, and Uche Odoputa
2012	Hot Brother		sequel to Holy Life; with Ella Njubuigbo, Rachael Okonkwo, and Uche Odoputa
2012	Military Zone		
2012	Royal Transition		sequel to Exit of the King; with Olu Jacobs, Nuella Njubigbo, Clem Ohameze; produced by Obi Cajetan; directed by Ugezu J. Ugezu
2013	Oga on Top	Osuofia	sequel to Osuofia's Wedding; with Funke Akindele
2013	Osuofia's Wedding	Osuofia	with Funke Akindele
2013	Return of Ukpaka		with Funke Akindele, Amaechi Muonagor, and Charles Inojie; produced by Mishack Chiemelie Nwonu; directed by Amayo Uzo Philips.
2013	Sherikoko Reloaded		with Funke Akindele and John Okafor
2013	Ukpaka the Trouble Maker		with Funke Akindele, Amaechi Muonagor, and Charles Inojie; produced by Mishack Chiemelie Nwonu; directed by Amayo Uzo Philips.
2014	Bomboy		with Osita Iheme and Uzoh Umeh
2014	My Property		with Chigozie Atuanya; directed by Tchidi Chikere
2014	Osuofia the Boxer		sequel to Bomboy; with Osita Iheme and Uzoh Umeh
2014	Wait and Take		with Chigozie Atuanya; directed by Tchidi Chikere
2015	Ekwueme		with Ken Erics
2015	Ghana Must Go		
2015	Show Bobo		with Amaechi Muonagor
2015	Sister Gabriela		with Queen Nwokoye
2016	My American Husband		with Chiwetalu Agu
2018	Lionheart	Chief Godswill Obiagu	with Genevieve Nnaji
2019	Kpali	Mr. Kalayor	with Gloria Young and Ini Dima-Okojie
2020	Small Chops	Smart	Directed by Robert Peters
2021	My Village People	Prof. Pium	with Bovi and Amaechi Muonagor
2022	Battle on Buka Street	Maduka	with Funke Akindele, Bimbo Ademoye
	Chief Daddy 2: Going for Broke	Shoffa Donatus	with Uzor Arukwe, Funke Akindele
	In Another Life	Dominic Igho	With Meg Otanwa, Clarion Chukwura-Abiola
	Foreigner's God	Onwubiko	With Nancy Isime, Ini Dima Okojie, Pete Edochie
	Obara'M	Humphrey	With Ibrahim Amodu, Ikekhua Anthonia
2023	The Bride Price	Professor	With Funny Bone, Adebayo Davies
	Zarz End		With Chioma Chukwuka Akpotha, Emeka Amakeze, Ejike Asiegbu
2024	Uno: The F in Family	Uzuakpundu	Directed by Ebuka Njoku
2024	Dead Serious	Mr. Kalu	Directed by Moses Inwang
2026	Call of My Life	Papa Soluchi	Directed by Dammy Twitch
unknown	Enemy of Peace	Emeta	with Olu Jacobs and Clem Ohameze
unknown	Enemy of the Kingdom	Emeta	sequel to Enemy of Peace; with Olu Jacobs and Clem Ohameze
unknown	Iron Lady		with Joy Ladi Torty
unknown	Mbakwe the Tailor	Mbakwe	
unknown	Mr. Osuofia	Aguiyi	with Dave Ihesie
unknown	White Child		With Frank Artus and Nuella Njubigbo

== Discography ==
=== Albums ===
- Osuofia in London (2003)
- The Master (2005)
- Obara’m (Original Motion Picture Soundtrack) (2023)

=== Singles ===
- “I Go Chop Your Dollar” (2005)
- “Agreement” (2005)
- “My People” (2023)
