= Bad Comments =

- Directed by: Moses Inwang
- Written by: Moses Inwang
- Screenplay by: Anthony Kehinde Joseph
- Story by: Moses Inwang
- Produced by: Darlington Abuda
- Starring: Jim Iyke; Osas Ighodaro; Ini Edo; Yemi Blaq; Chiwetalu Agu; Patience Ozokwor; Ruggedman
- Cinematography: Anietie James Ekiko
- Edited by: Moses Inwang
- Music by: Michael Truth Ogunlade
- Production company: FilmOne Production
- Distributed by: FilmOne Entertainment
- Release date: August 27, 2021
- Running time: 129 minutes
- Country: Nigeria
- Language: English

Bad Comments is a 2021 Nigerian film that stars Jim Iyke who is also the executive producer. The movie was released by FilmONE production company and was theatrically released on August 27, 2021. The film stars Jim Iyke, Osas Ighodaro, Yemi Blaq, Ini Edo, Sharon Ooja, Ayo Makun, Chiwetalu Agu, Ruggedman.

== Synopsis ==
The movie follows the life of Frank Orji, an actor with a vibrant acting career who gets his reputation tarnished following the release of an edited video online. This leads to excessive cyberbullying by online trolls. With the help of a hacker, his bodyguard, and his personal assistant, he is able to track down these trolls and give them a taste of their own medicine.

== Cast ==
- Jim Iyke as Frank Orji
- Osas Ighodaro as Hilda
- Desmond Elliot as Uche
- Francis Duru as Landlord
- Emelda Bassey as Amanda
- Timaya as Cameo Appearance
- Okor Saviour as Hitman
- Ini Edo as Cameo Appearance
- Anita Asuoha as Cameo Appearance
- Yomi Black as Airport Passenger
- Chiwetalu Agu as Elderly man
- Ayo Makun as Cameo Appearance
- Patience Ozokwor as Mama Frank
- Sharon Ooja as Tasha
- Ruggedman as Uwem
- Ben Lugo Touitou as Roma
- Udomboso John Saviours as Hakeem
- Edward Chukwuma - Jiah as Tornado
- Renier Roets as Mr Van Wijk
- Talitan Van Wyk as Mrs Van Wijk
- Melvin Oduah as Segun
- Bassey Ekpo Bassey as Ahmed's Lawyer
- John Tamuno as MD
- Hope Daniels as Music Producer
- Kilani Justice as Pastor
- Vanessa Aneto as Tessy
- Chinenye Nnebe as Sandra
- Halvin Okonmah as Hip Hip Guy
- Eniola Cole as Runs Girl
- Akpan Nyaknno as Nerdy Guy
- Obioma Ofoegbu as Weeping Driver
- Gift Igah as Crying Passenger
- Abel Adama as Student
- Bright Anyanwu as Athlete
- Tim Harmony as Moruf
- Doe Jnr. Otse as Emeka
- Energy Uloko as Politician
- Akanji Olarinde as Chop
- Amina Atairu as Clean Mouth
- Jewel Ike Obioha as Secretary

== See also ==
- List of Nigerian films of 2021
