= Ada Ameh =

Nigerian actress (1974–2022)

- Born: 15 May 1974; Ajegunle, Lagos State, Nigeria
- Died: 17 July 2022 (aged 48); Warri, Delta State, Nigeria
- Burial place: Otukpo LGA, Benue State, Nigeria
- Occupations: Actress; comedian
- Years active: 1995–2022
- Children: 1

Ada Ameh // (15 May 1974 – 17 July 2022) was a Nigerian actress who spent more than two decades in the Nigerian movie industry and was notable for playing the roles of Anita in the 1996 movie Domitilla and Emu Johnson in the award-winning Nigerian television series The Johnsons, in which she featured alongside other Nollywood actors including Charles Inojie, Chinedu Ikedieze, and Olumide Oworu.

== Early life and education ==
Ameh, although one of the Idoma of Benue State, was born and raised in Ajegunle in Lagos State in southwestern Nigeria, a region predominantly occupied by Yoruba-speaking people. Ameh received both primary and secondary education in Lagos State but eventually quit school at the age of 14, the same age at which she gave birth to her daughter.

== Career ==
In 1995, Ameh officially became part of the Nigerian movie industry, Nollywood, and received her first movie role in 1996, where she played the character Anita in the movie Domitila, which became quite successful. The movie was produced and directed by Zeb Ejiro. Ameh also featured in the Nigerian TV series titled The Johnsons, which also became a successful project that received awards.

== Later life ==
Ameh lost several family members: including, her own daughter, whom she gave birth to at age 14. Her daughter died in October 2020. Ameh died after collapsing in Warri on 17 July 2022 at the age of 48. She suffered from mental health issues prior to her death. A tribute occasion was held for her by the Actors Guild of Nigeria on 18 August 2022, and she was later buried on 26 August at her hometown in Otukpo, Benue State.

== Selected filmography ==
- Domitila (1996) as Anita
- Blood Money (1997)
- Aki na Ukwa (with Osita Iheme & Chinedu Ikedieze)
- One Good Turn (2005)
- Phone Swap (2012) as Cynthia (with Wale Ojo, Chika Okpala, Nse Ikpe-Etim & Joke Silva)
- King Of Shitta (2013) as Madam
- 30 Days in Atlanta (2014) as Akpos' Mum
- Ghana Must Go (2016)
- Atlas (2017) Mama Vero
- Òlòtūré (2019) as Titi
- Our Husband (2017) as Mama Adisa
- A Million Baby (2017)
- Double Trouble
- The Sessions (2020) as Aunty Rose
- My Village People (2021) as Witch
- On my honour (2021)
- Lockdown (2021) as Mrs. Adebola
- Mr. & Mrs. Okoli (2021) Mama Okoli
- Gone (2021) as Ani's Aunty
- Mighty (2022) as Mama
- 5 Days to New Year (2022) as Mama Rebe

=== TV series ===
- The Johnsons (2012-2022) as Emu Johnson - starring Samuel Ajibola, Charles Inojie, Susan Pwajok, Ada Ameh, Chinedu Ikedieze, Olumide Oworu, Kunle Bamtefa, Stephanie Zibili, Gaji Samuel, Daniel Iroegbu, and Seun Adebajo.
- IjeBaby Chopping Center (2022) as Big Mama
