= Chukwuka Emelionwu =

Nigerian film producer and marketer (died 2018)

- Died: 17 January 2018; Oraukwu, Anambra State, Nigeria
- Other name: Kasvid
- Occupations: Film producer, film marketer
- Years active: 1990s–2018
- Organization: Kas-Vid International
- Known for: Issakaba; Aki na Ukwa; Mr. Ibu films

Chukwuka Emelionwu (also known as Kasvid) was a Nigerian film producer and marketer. He was associated with several widely circulated home videos of the late 1990s and early 2000s, including Issakaba, Aki na Ukwa, and titles in the Mr. Ibu series.

== Background and career ==
Emelionwu was from Neni in Njikoka Local Government Area, Anambra State. He worked as a producer and marketer during the period when Nigerian feature films were sold mainly on VHS and VCD. His company, Kas-Vid International, was based in Lagos and sometimes co-produced with other marketers, among them Mosco International.

He received a producer and story credit on Issakaba, directed by Lancelot Oduwa Imasuen and co-produced with Moses Nnam of Mosco International.

In 2002 he produced Aki na Ukwa, which paired Chinedu Ikedieze and Osita Iheme. Both actors later said Emelionwu had selected them and commissioned a script built around the two of them; the pairing became known on screen as Aki and Pawpaw. Ikedieze said he first met Emelionwu at an audition while studying at the Institute of Management and Technology in Enugu. Iheme said he met him in Enugu in 2002 after moving from Aba.

== Death ==
Emelionwu died on 17 January 2018. The Nation reported that he was 50 years old. Premium Times later described him as 39.

== Filmography ==
- Issakaba (2001) – producer, story
- The Last Burial – producer
- Aki na Ukwa (c. 2002) – producer
- Mr. Ibu (2004) – producer
- Mr. Ibu in London (2004) – producer
- The Captain (2006) – producer
- A Million Madness – story / producer
