= Africa Movie Academy Award for Lifetime Achievement =

The Lifetime Achievement Award of the Africa Film Academy is given to individuals that have contributed tremendously to the growth of African cinema. Amaka Igwe was the first recipient of the award in 2005.

== Awards ==
=== List of Winners ===
==== 1st Africa Movie Academy Awards ====
- Amaka Igwe

==== 2nd Africa Movie Academy Awards ====
- Hubert Ogunde (posthumously)

Gadala Gubara of the Sudan was in May 2006 awarded a lifetime achievement award at the second Africa Movie Academy Awards (AMAA) in Yenagoa,

==== 3rd Africa Movie Academy Awards ====
- Osita Iheme and Chinedu Ikedieze

==== 9th Africa Movie Academy Awards ====
- Chief Pete Edochie
- Tunde Kelani
- Sir Ositadinma Okeke Oguno (Ossy Affason)
- Ayuko Babu
- Eddie Ugbomah

==== 10th Africa Movie Academy Awards ====
- Bob-Manuel Udokwu

==== 11th Africa Movie Academy Awards ====
- Tony Vander Heyden

==== 12th Africa Movie Academy Awards ====
- Richard Mofe Damijo
- Olu Jacobs
- Joke Silva
- Tony Akposheri
