= Victor Osuagwu =

Nigerian actor

- Born: Victor Ifeanyichukwu Osuagwu; March 6, 1974 (age 52); Imo State, Nigeria
- Education: University of Port Harcourt
- Occupation: Actor
- Spouse: Roseline Nchelem
- Awards: City People Movie Special Recognition Award

Victor Osuagwu // is a Nigerian actor who won the City People Movie Special Recognition Award at the City People Entertainment Awards and Is a former president of the Lagos State chapter of the Actors Guild of Nigeria.

== Early life and education ==
Osuagwu is from Mbaise Local Government Area of Imo State in the southeastern geographical location of Nigeria. He is from a family of five, being the youngest. Born in Imo State, but grew up in Rivers State, where his mother originates. He was raised under the care of his grandmother in Queens' Town, Opobo. His educational journey began in Rivers State, where he completed part of his primary schooling. He then returned to Imo State to finish primary school and attend secondary school in the Udu autonomous community. Later, he pursued higher education at the University of Port Harcourt, Rivers State, graduating with a degree in Theatre Arts.

== Career ==
Osuagwu officially became recognized as a Nigerian actor in 1997. Osuagwu debuted into the Nigerian movie industry Nollywood with the second part of a movie titled Evil Passion 2 whilst an undergraduate in the university.

== Endorsement ==
Osuagwu In 2015 became an ambassador for Nigerian multinational telecommunications company GLO.

== Awards ==
Osuagwu won the City People Movie Special Recognition Award at the City People Entertainment Awards.

== Personal life ==
Osuagwu is married to Roseline Nchelem, whom he met in 1990 and married in 2002. The union was blessed with four children. Osuagwu is also a Nigerian chief & bears the title of Ochibundu 1 of Udo Ancient Kingdom in Ezinihitte Mbaise LGA of Imo State.

== Selected filmography ==
- Onye-Eze (2001)
- Ofeke (2002)
- $1 (One Dollar) (2002) (with Patience Ozokwor)
- Fools (2003)
- Lion Finger (2003)
- My Only Love (2003) as Osigwe
- No Shaking (2003) as Ojemba (with Chiwetalu Agu and Sam Loco Efe)
- Nwa Teacher (2003) as Akachukwu
- Punching Bag (2003)
- Slow Poison (2003) Makor
- Joshua (2005)
- Trouble Makers (2005)
- Anti-Crime (2006)
- Chelsea/Liverpool (2006)
- Men On The Run (2006)
- My Kingdom Come (2006)
- Store Keeper (2006)
- Tears From Holland (2006)
- Bird Flu (2007) as Malachi
- Powerful Civilian (2007) as Alloy
- Vineyard (2008)
- Agaba (2009)
- My Classmate (2011)
- Iron Pant (2012)
- Titus the Village Gossiper (2018)
- Adam Goes to School
- Corporate Beggar
- Evil Passion
- Awilo Sharp-Sharp
- He Goat
- Keke Soldiers
- Our Daily Bread
- Onye Amuma (with Nkem Owoh)
- The Chronicles (with Onyeka Onwenu & Segun Arinze)
- Professional Beggars
- Father and Son (2022) as Okeke
- A Country Called Ghana (2024)
- 3 Working Days (2024)
- Move Like a Boss (2024) as Barrister
