= The Last Burial =

2000 Nigerian film

- Directed by: Lancelot Oduwa Imasuen
- Screenplay by: Reginald Ebere
- Story by: Chukwuka Emelionwu
- Based on: Life and death of Ogbuefi Nnamani
- Produced by: Prince Emeka Ani
- Starring: Clement Ohameze; Eucharia Anunobi; Sam Dede; Chika Anyanwu; Larry Koldsweat; Amaechi Muonagor; Tony Niemanze; Chinwetalu Agu; Andy Chukwu
- Cinematography: Ngozi Nkebakwu
- Edited by: Fidelis Ewata
- Music by: Stanley Okorie
- Production companies: Kas-Vid International Limited; Mosco International Limited
- Release date: 2000
- Running time: 103 minutes
- Country: Nigeria
- Language: English

The Last Burial is a 2000 Nigerian classic supernatural film, directed by Lancelot Oduwa Imasuen.

== Plot ==
This movie tells a story of a man who had financial difficulties. As a result of his predicament, he was introduced to an occult group by his friends. Because of this, he had to make some human sacrifices. For years the man enjoyed a good life, and then it was time for him to die. When he died, his burial created a lot of problems. The film was based on the real-life happenings surrounding the death of Ogbuefi Nnamani.

== Cast ==
- Clem Ohameze as Ogbuefi
- Eucharia Anunobi as Susan
- Amaechi Muonagor
- Sam Dede as Nnado
- Bimbo Manuel
- Chiwetalu Agu
- Ndifreke Ukpong as Friend
- Chika Anyanwu
- Okey Igwe
- Ernest Asuzu
- Andy Chukwu
- Ifeanyi Ikpoenyi
- Larry Koldsweat
- Tony Niemanze
