= 2 Rats =

2003 Nigerian comedy film

- Directed by: Andy Chukwu
- Starring: Chinedu Ikedieze; Osita Iheme
- Narrated by: Matthew Triana
- Distributed by: OJ Productions International
- Release date: 2003
- Country: Nigeria
- Language: English

2 Rats is Nigerian comedy film directed by Andy Chukwu in 2003.

Nollywood's highest-paid actors, Osita Iheme (A-boy) and Chinedu Ikedieze (Bobo), play two young boys whose father has been murdered by their uncle. In a selfish move, Amaechi Muonagor wants them to work as house boys in their father's house. This film is prominently depicting 2 boys named A-boy and Bobo as they explored the tribulations of casting aside their friends and family for a savvy entrepreneur that promised them large fortunes in return for their labour. The deception and lies come from this story contained in the message of "don't dog the boys". A-boy and Bobo have other plans. The film features performances by Aki and Pawpaw.

== Cast ==
- Amaechi Muonagor - Ndukwe
- Osita Iheme - Aboy
- Chinedu Ikedieze - Bobo
- Patience Ozokwor - Oriaku
- Andy Chukwu
- Prince Nwafor
- David Ihesie
- Chidinma and Chidiebere Aneke
- Ricky Eze

== See also ==
- List of Nigerian films of 2003
