= My Village People =

2021 Nigerian comedy thriller film by Niyi Akinmolayan

- Directed by: Niyi Akinmolayan
- Written by: Bovi Ugboma
- Produced by: Rukeme David Eruotor; Michael Djaba
- Starring: Nkem Owoh; Amaechi Muonagor; Charles Inojie
- Production companies: Kountry Kulture Network; FilmOne Entertainment; TMPL Motion Pictures
- Distributed by: FilmOne Entertainment
- Release dates: 6 June 2021 (Lagos premiere); 11 June 2021 (Nigeria)
- Country: Nigeria
- Language: English

My Village People is a 2021 Nigerian comedy supernatural thriller film written by Bovi Ugboma and directed by Niyi Akinmolayan. It stars Bovi Ugboma, Nkem Owoh, Amaechi Muonagor, and Charles Inojie in the lead roles. The film premiered at Filmhouse Cinemas in Lagos on 6 June 2021, was released theatrically on 11 June 2021, and is available on Netflix.

== Synopsis ==
Prince, a young man, has a weakness for women, which eventually lands him in trouble as he is caught in a bizarre love triangle with witches and marine spirits.

== Cast ==
- Bovi as Prince
- Nkem Owoh as Prof. Pium
- Theresa Edem as Haggai
- Amaechi Muonagor as Ndio
- Charles Inojie as Uncle Jakpa
- Sophie Alakija as Ame
- Rachael Oniga as Witch 1
- Ada Ameh as Witch 2
- Binta Ayo Mogaji as Witch 3
- Venita Akpofure as Princess
- Zubby Michael as Bishop Divine
- Akah Nnani as Driver
- Mimi Onalaja as Mrs. Okafor

== Production ==
The film was produced in collaboration with Kountry Kulture Network, FilmOne Distributions, and TMPL Motion Pictures. Principal photography of the film began in January 2021, and the first-look poster was unveiled by Bovi in April 2021.

== Release and reception ==
The film premiered at Filmhouse Cinemas in Lagos on 6 June 2021 and was released theatrically across Nigeria on 11 June 2021.

=== Box office ===
My Village People opened with a gross of ₦19,128,800 and, in its first week, earned ₦35,531,000 at the Nigerian box office. After three weeks, it had grossed over ₦70 million and eventually reached ₦100,958,400 after 12 weeks, making it the 17th film to surpass the ₦100 million mark and one of Nollywood's highest-grossing films.

=== Critical response ===
The film received mixed to positive reviews from critics. In a positive review, Chidinma Okere of The Lagos Review wrote that My Village People is "a well-done Naija-style horror film" and that it "makes for an easy, relaxing watch". Franklin Ugobude of Culture Custodian cited the "exaggerated and overdependence on comic relief" as one of the film's writing shortcomings but praised it as "a decent attempt at comedy-horror". Blessing Chinwendu Nwankwo of Afrocritik gave the film a 3.5/5 rating, commending the film for building "a certain level of suspense and unpredictability", but compared it unfavourably to older Nollywood horror films, noting that "its portrayal of spiritual warfare comes across in a humorous light". Olamide Adio, writing for What Kept Me Up, referred to the film as a "salad of old Nollywood and Neo-Nollywood," adding that "the comedic elements upstaged the horror". Nganda Cinema gave the film a 3/5 star rating.

In a mixed review, Tolulope Ebiseni of TXT gave the film a 42% score and wrote that "Niyi Akinmolayan's My Village People does not deliver a worthy story for its potent and relatable subject matter; not even shiny cinematography can save it," and observed that "the major conundrum of My Village People is its inability to fully utilise the two merged themes it uses, horror and comedy, along with its half-baked story".

== Controversy ==
Despite the film's box office success, the writer and lead actor, Bovi, accused the director, Niyi Akinmolayan, of being egotistical, a clout chaser, and driven by an inferiority complex. Bovi expressed his dissatisfaction with working with Akinmolayan in a social media post on 3 July 2021, nearly a month after the film's theatrical release.
