= The Ghost and the Tout Too =

2021 Nollywood film

- Directed by: Micheal Akinrogunde
- Screenplay by: Abosi Ogba, Akay Mason, Uyoyu Asia, Yusuf Carew
- Starring: Toyin Abraham; Iyabo Ojo; Mercy Johnson
- Production company: FilmOne Entertainment Toyin Abraham Films Production
- Release date: 2021
- Country: Nigeria
- Language: English

The Ghost and the Tout Too is a 2021 film directed by Michael Akinrogunde and is a sequel to the 2018 film "The Ghost and the Tout" directed by Charles Uwagbai. The film features Toyin Abraham who plays lead but stars alongside notable veteran actors including Patience Ozokwo, Iyabo Ojo, Mercy Johnson-Okojie, Odunlade Adekola, Ini Edo, Ali Nuhu, Deyemi Okanlawon, Osas Ighodaro.

It was listed as one of the highest grossing Nigerian films in 2021.

== Synopsis ==
In the film, Isla continues to see more ghosts than before and has evolved into a messenger for the dead. She now also has a partner, Makawhy. Isla is sought for by any ghost who has been unfairly killed or who has a score to settle with the living. She eventually encounters Amoke, a "semi-ghost"; a woman who is in a coma and caught between the worlds of the living and the dead. Finding the person who poisoned her and attempting to awaken her from her unconscious state is isla's main mission, because Amoke only has a few days to live.

== Cast ==
- Toyin Abraham as Isila
- Patience Ozokwo as Mama G
- Iyabo Ojo
- Mercy Johnson-Okojie as Amoke
- Odunlade Adekola as Doctor Ade
- Ini Edo as Aunty Funto
- Destiny Etiko as Ebere
- Mohbad as Himself
- Ali Nuhu
- Deyemi Okanlawon as Officer Bolaji
- Osas Ighodaro as Yvonne
- Anita Asuoha (Real Warri Pikin)
- 9ice as Himself

== Production ==
The film was produced by Toyin Abraham who also starred in the lead role, in collaboration Fwith ilmOne entertainment. It was directed by Michael Akinrogunde, who is known for his work in Nigerian cinema. The production featured a diverse cast of some of Nollywood's most prominent actors and actresses, which contributed to the film's high-profile status. The screenplay was written by Abosi Ogba, Akay Mason, Uyoyou Adia, and Yusuf Carew, who wrote a first draft within two months.

Filming took place in various locations across Nigeria, and the production aimed to blend comedy, drama, and elements of the supernatural. The film was shot with a mix of traditional and digital cinematography, contributing to its unique visual style.

== Release ==
The Ghost and the Tout Too was released in Nigerian cinemas on September 10, 2021. The film's release was highly anticipated due to the success of its predecessor, The Ghost and the Tout. It premiered to a positive reception from fans and performed well at the Nigerian box office. It also gained attention for its star-studded cast and comedic elements.

The film premiered in cinemas on September 5, 2021, and on Netflix on July 15, 2022.
