= Billionaire's Club =

Billionaires Club
- Directed by: Afam Okereke
- Release date: 2003
- Running time: 109 minutes
- Country: Nigeria
- Language: English

Billionaire's Club is a Nigerian movie directed by Afam Okereke released in 2003. The movie involves a secret society of men who use occult powers to manipulate people and make blood money.

== Cast ==
- Pete Edochie as Billion
- Fabian Adibe as Igbo
- Chidi Ihezie as Victoria
- Kanayo O. Kanayo as Don
- Clem Ohameze as Okwute
- Patience Ozokwor as Njideka
- Sola Sobowale as Amandi
- Tony Umez as Zed
- Bruno Iwuoha as Billionaire
- Pete Eneh as Ekwe
- Oge Okoye as Oby
- Nebechi Adione as Ngozi
- Sam Ajah as M.C.
- Chuma Ajoku as Don's Gateman
- Mercy Akanyak as Nurse
- Princess Egu as Nurse
- Chidi Igweazimuba as Baby
- Bishop K.C. as Billionaire
- Chibueze Okechukwu as Ikenna
- Ezinne Otinzo as Eunice
