= Emeka Enyiocha (actor) =

Nigerian actor and entrepreneur

- Born: 6 March 1972 (age 54); Umuahia, Abia State.
- Citizenship: Nigerian
- Education: Lagos State University
- Occupation: Actor

Chukwuemeka Michael Enyiocha (born 6 March 1972), is a Nigerian actor and entrepreneur. He was born in Umuahia, the capital of Abia State in South East Nigeria.

== Life and education ==
Enyiocha is from Umuobiaosu, a community in Afugiri,Umuahia North Local Government Area of Abia State, Nigeria. He is the first child in a family of eight children. He completed his secondary school education at Government Technical School in Port Harcourt. He then pursued higher education at Lagos State University, where he earned a Diploma in Theatre Arts in 2002.

He is married to Stella Ugoji, whom he met in 2006. After a two-year courtship, they were married on 21 December 2008 and have three children

== Filmography ==
- Old School (2002)
