= Married to the Enemy =

- Directed by: Willie Adah Ajenge
- Produced by: Andy K. Nwawulhe
- Starring: Rita Dibia; Moses Ebere; Ini Edo; Desmond Elliot; Mercy Johnson; Cosmos Okey
- Release date: 2006
- Country: Nigeria
- Language: English

Married to the Enemy is a 2006 Nigerian drama film directed Willie Adah Ajenge. The film was produced by Andy K. Nwawulhe.

== Cast ==
- Rita Dibia
- Moses Ebere
- Ini Edo
- Desmond Elliot
- Mercy Johnson
- Cosmos Okey
