= Chidinma and Chidiebere Aneke =

Nollywood's identical twins

- Born: 24 August 1986 (age 40); Enugu, Enugu State, Nigeria
- Other name: Aneke Twins
- Education: University of Nigeria, Nsukka
- Occupations: Actress, movie producers
- Years active: 1999 - present
- Awards: Humanitarian Award

Chidinma and Chidiebere Aneke (born 6 August 1986) are identical twins in the Nollywood industry popularly known as the Aneke twins. They were born in the southeastern part of Nigeria, Enugu State, and they are the last issue to the Aneke family. They are actresses and movie producers.

== Early life and education ==
Chidinma and Chidiebere were born on 6 August 1986 in Enugu State, Nigeria, into a polygamous home of three wives. They had a wealthy father who ensured rosy upkeep for them, but things changed when they lost him, and his properties were divided among extended family members. They acquired their Primary School Leaving Certificate and Secondary School Certificates in Enugu State. After their primary and secondary education, Chidinma and Chidiebere proceeded to the University of Nigeria, Nsukka where they graduated with a Bachelor of Science in Mass Communication and a Bachelor of Science in Banking and Finance, respectively.

== Career ==
The Aneke twins joined the Nollywood industry in 1999 and acted in the movie ‘Ebuka’ which was their first movie. The movie ‘Ebuka’ gave them an edge in Nollywood. In 2004, the Aneke twins rose to fame with the movie ‘Desperate Twins’ which earned them the nomination for The Most Promising Acts to Watch at the African Magic Viewers’ Choice Award. They have acted in over 80 movies. They have produced many Nollywood movies, such as; ‘Heart of Isiaku’, ‘Onochie’, ‘Broken Ambition’’, and ‘Adaora’.

== Filmography ==
- Jealous Friends (2009)
- Desperate Twins
- Lagos Girls (2003)
- 2 Rats (2003)
- Broken Ambition
- Jealous Friends
- Unmarked
- Nowhere To Run
- The Ugly Truth
- Imperfect world
- Perfect Family
- Dangerous
- Heart Battle for the Kingdom

== Awards ==
- Humanitarian Award
