= Old School (2002 film) =

2002 Nigerian comedy film

- Directed by: Gabriel Moses
- Produced by: Patience Ozokwor
- Starring: Patience Ozokwor, Sam Loco Efe, Chinwetalu Agu
- Release date: 2002
- Country: Nigeria
- Language: English

Old School is a 2002 Nigerian comedy film directed by Gabriel Moses and released by Amaco Investments. It features Patience Ozokwor, Sam Loco Efe and Chiwetalu Agu.

== Synopsis ==
The film is about the funny life of a woman popularly known as Mama G.

== Cast ==
- Sam Loco Efe
- Chiwetalu Agu
- Ify Afuba
- Pete Eneh
- Patrick Okoye
- Emeka Enyiocha
- Chidi Ihezie
- Patience Ozokwor
- Bob-Manuel Udokwu
