= Aki na Ukwa =

2002 Nigerian film 16-07-2003

- Directed by: Amayo Uzo Philips
- Produced by: Chukwuka Emelionwu
- Starring: Osita Iheme; Chinedu Ikedieze; Oby Kechere; Amaechi Muonagor; Frances Nsokwu
- Distributed by: Kas-Vid International
- Release date: 2002
- Running time: 128 minutes
- Country: Nigeria
- Languages: English; Igbo

Aki na Ukwa is a 2002 Nigerian family comedy film directed by Amayo Uzo Philips. The film stars Osita Iheme and Chinedu Ikedieze. The film launched the acting careers of the two actors, Osita and Chinedu, and this film marked their maiden collaboration. The film was critically acclaimed, opening to positive reviews, and the film has been regarded as one of the finest ever films in Nigerian cinema, mainly for the introduction of Osita Iheme and Chinedu Ikedieze in the lead roles playing the so-called characters of PawPaw and Aki, respectively- known in some countries as Dada and Mo. The duo rose to stardom and became overnight sensations in Nigeria for their performance in the film since its release. Since then, the duo have starred together in several films in the lead roles. Chukwuka Emelionwu who was the producer of the film, was credited for creating brand characters "Aki" and "PawPaw".

== Synopsis ==
Two brothers cause complete chaos at their home, in their school, and basically in their whole village.

== Cast ==
- Osita Iheme as Pawpaw
- Chinedu Ikedieze as Aki
- Oby Kechere as Gladys
- Amaechi Muonagor as Mbakwe
- Frances Nsokwu as Dorcas
- Steve Ahanonu as Ngada
- Philip Emere as Henchman
- Judith Eze as Woman
- Okey Igwe as Suspect
- Onwuka Okike as Otenkwu

== Legacy ==
Chinede Ikedieze's performance alongside fellow little person co-star Osita Iheme in the film is still widely spoken about, and the duo (especially Osita's character) has been trending through memes since 2019 on Twitter and other social media platforms globally.
