= Nkiru Sylvanus =

Nigerian actress, politician (born 1982)

Nkiru Sylvanus Riches
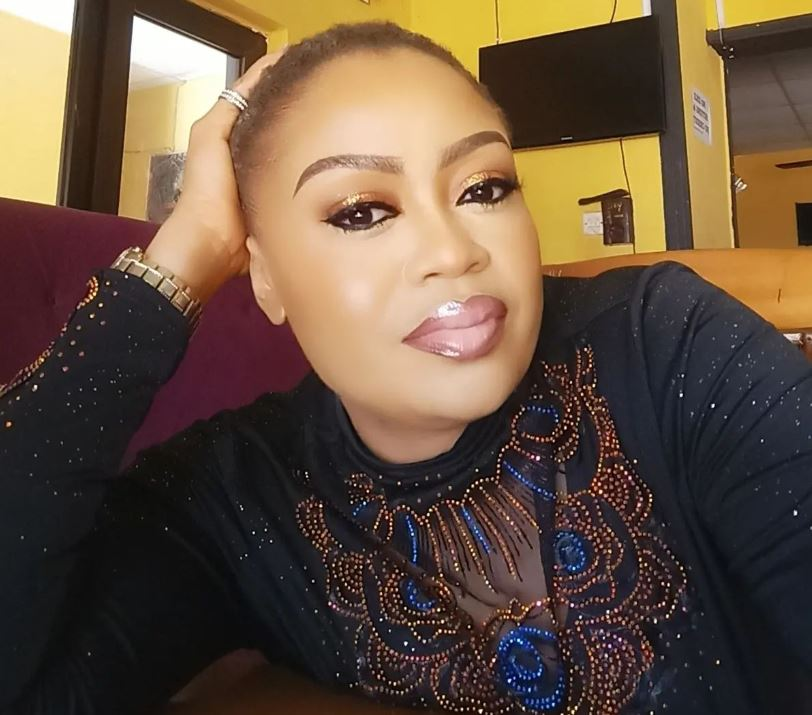
- Born: 21 April 1985 (age 41); Abia State, Nigeria
- Education: Enugu State University of Science and Technology
- Occupations: Actress; politician
- Years active: 2001–present
- Spouse: Riches Sammy
- Awards: Best Actress of the Year at the Africa Magic Viewers Choice Awards

Nkiru Sylvanus Riches // (born 21 April 1985) is a Nigerian actress and politician. She has featured in over two hundred movies and has been nominated for Best Actress of the Year at the Africa Magic Viewers' Choice Awards and Best Actress in a Leading Role at the Africa Movie Academy Awards.

== Early life ==
Sylvanus was born in Osisioma, Aba, a city located in Abia State.

== Education ==
She attended Ohabiam Primary and Secondary School, where she obtained her first school leaving certificate and West African Senior School Certificate. She also attended the Enugu State University of Science and Technology, graduating with a BSc degree in mass communication.

== Acting career ==
Described by The Punch newspaper as a veteran, Sylvanus began her acting career at the age of 16 in 2001, and her breakout role came in 2002 with the film A Cry for Help, where she played Blessing, earning her the nickname 'Ble-Ble. She has been featured in over 800 Nollywood movies. Her first acting was by coincidence when her house was requested to be used as a King's Palace in a movie.

She has been featured twice (2017 & 2018) in The Guardian's publication on Celebrities Who Made Headlines.

== Political career ==
In 2011, Sylvanus was included in the cabinet of former governor of Imo state Rochas Okorocha as his Special Assistant on Lagos State Affairs, and later became his Special Adviser on Public Affairs.

== 2012 kidnap and release ==
Sylvanus, when she was a special assistant to former Governor of Imo state, Rochas Okorocha for Public Affairs, was kidnapped on 15 December 2012 at 2.30pm, as reported by various reputable Nigerian media houses. A Vanguard media publication reported that a ransom of a ₦100,000,000 (one hundred million naira) which was (per exchange rate) in 2012 equivalent to $640,000 (six hundred and forty thousand U.S dollars) was demanded by her captors in exchange for her release. It was reported by Nigerian media houses that on 21 December 2012 at 10:30pm, Sylvanus was released by her kidnappers.

== Awards ==
- Best Actress of the Year at the Africa Magic Viewers' Choice Awards
- Best Actress in a Leading Role at the Africa Movie Academy Awards

== Personal life ==
On January 12, 2023, Sylvanus married Riches Sammy traditionally in her hometown in Osisioma, a local government area in the Abia state. Her husband is a Japan-based actor, business mogul, and investor who invested in Japanese nightlife entertainment and hospitality. Riches Sammy owns club, bars, luxurious restaurants, and lounges in Japan and Nigeria. His business enterprises also include beauty and anti-aging equipment, cars, and other businesses. Sylvanus and Riches Sammy celebrated their white church wedding in the Enugu state on January 15, 2023.

Nkeiru Sylvanus was a brand influencer for her husband's brand 7th Planet International Ltd, an entertainment and hospitality company which manages lounges, restaurants, and film productions in Enugu State.

Riches is a sports lover who played for the England Team in a Japan Rugby World Cup TV Promo in 2019.
