= Tony Umez =

Nigerian actor (born 1964)

- Born: 23 August 1964 (age 62); Ogidi, Anambra State
- Education: University of Lagos
- Occupation: actor
- Years active: 1993-present
- Spouse: Patsy Ogochukwu Umez (m. 1999)
- Children: Beautiful Umez; Angel Umez; Princes Umez; Golden Michelle Umez

Tony Umez is a veteran Nigerian actor. He has acted in more than 200 Nollywood films of both English and Yoruba languages since his debut in the 1998 film Died Wretched: Buried in N2.3m Casket.

== Early life and education ==
Tony Umez was born in Ogidi, Anambra State, in southeast Nigeria. His mother is from Cross River State, while his father is from Ogidi, the same place he was born. Despite his Igbo origin, he doesn't speak Igbo but can fluently speak Efik, his mother's language. Umez grew up in Lagos, where he had his primary and secondary education. He also has a bachelor's degree and master's degree in English and international law and diplomacy, respectively from the University of Lagos.

== Acting career ==
He started acting in his secondary days when he performed in stage plays and dramas. In 1993, the actor joined Nollywood. He did not get a dime from his two movies, which made him leave the industry for a few years.

- He returned to the industry in 1997 and featured in the movie, "The Princess" but it was the movie,"Died Wretched" which was released in 1998, that made him popular.
- Tony Umez then went on to star in the 2003 blockbuster hit movie, "Billionaire's Club" which was released in 2003. He also went on to star in another massive hit of the same year called "Blood Sisters".

== Personal life ==
He met his wife, Patsy Ogochukwu, while filming a church movie. They played spouses on-screen and later became husband and wife in real life, following a five-year courtship (1994–1999). They've been married for 21 years. They have four children; Beautiful Umez, Angel Umez, Princess Umez, and Golden Michelle Umez.

== Filmography ==
| Year | Film | Role |
|---|---|---|
| 1997 | The Princess | |
| 1998 | Died Wretched | Chris |
| 1998 | Sakobi | Patrick |
| 1999 | The Visitor | Mike |
| 1999 | Asimo | Minister |
| 2000 | Executive Crime | Collins |
| 2000 | Remember Your Mother | Chief Dankwa |
| 2001 | Death Warrant | Mike |
| 2001 | Attack | Pastor Gideon |
| 2002 | Blind Justice | |
| 2003 | Blood Sister | Kenneth |
| 2003 | Christ in Me | Richard |
| 2003 | Billionaires Club | Zed |
| 2003 | Forever Yours | Paul |
| 2004 | My first love | |
| 2005 | Total Disgrace | Andy |
| 2006 | Demon In-Law | Emeka |
| 2007 | 100 Days in the Jungle | Ovie Okito |
| 2008 | Before My Eyes | Lanre |
| 2010 | Stranger on My Bed | Samuel |
| 2016 | Moon Maids | Igwe Osita |
| 2018 | Gamble | David |
| 2020 | Family Guest | Felix |
| 2021 | Lockdown | Martins |
| 2023 | THE FAST LANE: Hunt for Gold Mine | James Senior |
