= Sam Loco Efe =

Nigerian actor (1939–2011)

- Born: Samuel Arase Efeimwonkiyeke; 25 December 1939; Enugu, British Nigeria (present-day Nigeria)
- Died: 7 August 2011 (aged 71); Amakohia, Nigeria
- Occupation: Actor
- Years active: 1977–2012
- Military career
- Allegiance: Biafra
- Branch: (Republic of Biafra) Biafran Armed Forces
- Service years: 1967–1968
- Conflicts: Nigerian Civil War

Samuel Arase Efeimwonkiyeke (25 December 1939 – 7 August 2011), better known by his stage name Sam Loco Efe, was a Nigerian actor, film producer, and director.

== Early life and career ==
Sam Loco Efe was born in Enugu State, eastern Nigeria, and was the son of Arase Efeimwonkiyeke, a warder. His father was of ethnic Edo ancestry and worked in Eastern Nigeria, and his mother was a petty trader who sold bean cakes. He spent a considerable part of his childhood in the town of Abakaliki in present-day Ebonyi State, southeastern Nigeria. He lost his father when he was in elementary school. Efe then spent more than the normal years to obtain an elementary education because he had to help his mother in her trade in order to earn income for the family. His first experience with acting was at his school when a theatre group came to stage a play called The Doctor In Spite Of Himself, afterwards, he discussed with members of the group about the theatre and performance arts. In elementary school, he was a member of various groups, including a drama society that performed a rendition of Shakespeare's Julius Caesar at an Eastern regional arts festival in Abakaliki. The play came last in the drama competition, but Efe was noted as the best actor, which earned him a scholarship to complete elementary school. After finishing elementary school, he attended various secondary schools and was active in the drama society, organizing a performance of The Doctor in Spite of Himself and a play called Vendetta. After secondary school, he was a member of a traveling theatre group and played soccer, earning the moniker locomotive later shortened as loco.

During the Nigerian Civil War, Efe fought on the Biafran side of the war until he returned to Benin City in 1968. While in Benin City, he started the Ovonranwen Theatre Group with their debut production being Ogierhiakhi's Obaiwape. However, his earnings from acting were meagre and thereafter, he traveled to Lagos to seek better career opportunities and to explore a career in football. He got his first job in 1972 working for Michelin Tyres. He applied for the position without knowing how to drive, which was a requirement for the job. He learned how to drive a day before the interview. During the interview, he passed the oral interview and failed the driving test, but honesty about his error in judgement won over the interviewer. He worked for Michelin selling tyres in Lagos, Ijebu Ode, and Abeokuta. He soon left Michelin to work for Dunlop Tyres as a senior sales representative in the Tyres and Allied Products division. While working for Dunlop in Benin, he was a cast member of NTA Benin's television series, Hotel de Jordan, and also performed in a rendition of Ola Rotimi's The Gods are Not to Blame. In 1977, he left sales for a career in theatre. He auditioned and got the lead part of Langbodo, a play by Dapo Adelugba presented during Festac. After the end of Festac, Adelugba introduced him to a friend of his at the University of Ibadan about opportunities in theatre. Adelugba's friend was able to get Efe a position as a senior artiste in the institution.

== Filmography ==
- I'll Take My Chances (2011) as Chief Ekpene
- Adora (2011)
- Open & Close (2011) as Agu
- Heart of Stone (2010)
- Intelligent Students (2008) as Benji
- Marcus 'D' Millionaire (2008)
- Osuofia and the Wise Men (2008)
- Husband My Foot (2008)
- Ojadike
- I want to harvest you
- A Fool at 40 (2006)
- Angel in Hell (2006)
- Final World Cup (2005)
- Blood Billionaires 2 (2005)
- Daddy Must Obey (2004)
- Old School (2004)
- The Return of Anunuebe (2003)
- Tom and Jerry (2003) as Papa P (with Chinedu Ikedieze and Osita Iheme)
- Osuofia in London (2003)
- My Love (2002)
- Long John (2002)
- Owo Blow (1997) as Baba Landlord
- Ukwa (1995)
- Chief Obwago
- Nneka the Pretty Serpent (1994) as Mazi Nwosu
- Vigilante (1988) as Sam Efe Loco
- Things Fall Apart (1987)

== Death ==
Sam Loco Efe was found dead in a hotel room on a Sunday morning. The room door was forced open after he failed to come down after retiring to bed the previous night. The cause of his death has never been known until now. He died sitting on a chair in the hotel room with Ventolin inhalers beside him. The former vice president of the Actors Guild of Nigeria (AGN), Mr Steve Eboh, who happened to be a close friend and confidant to Sam Loco, said Sam Loco had plans to visit his farmhouse at Ebonyi State and rest there for a while, but that desire was never fulfilled.
