= Pete Edochie =

Nigerian actor (born 1947)

Chief Peter Uwadiegwu Ogugua Edochie MON
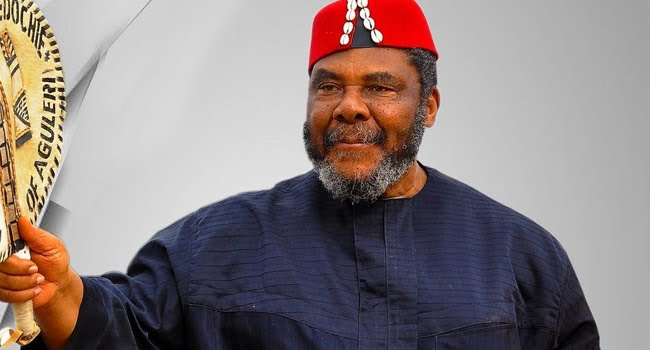
- Pete Edochie
- Born: Peter Edochie; 7 March 1947 (age 79); Zaria, Kaduna State, Nigeria
- Occupation: Actor
- Years active: 1980s–present
- Spouse: Josephine Edochie
- Children: Linc Edochie; Yul Edochie
- Honours: AMVCA Industry Merit Award

Chief Peter Uwadiegwu Ogugua Edochie MON // (born 7 March 1947) (popularly known as Pete Edochie) is a Nigerian actor. He rose to prominence in the 1980s with his portrayal of Okonkwo in a Nigerian Television Authority adaptation of Chinua Achebe's novel Things Fall Apart. He began his career as an administrator and broadcaster and later became a leading actor and has received several honours, including the Industry Merit Award from Africa Magic, a Lifetime Achievement Award from the Africa Film Academy, and the national honour of Member of the Order of the Niger conferred on him in 2003 by President Olusegun Obasanjo.

== Early life and education ==
Edochie was born on 7 March 1947 in Zaria, Kaduna State, and is of Igbo descent.

He studied at St. Patrick's and St. James Primary School, Zaria, before attending St. John's College for his secondary education. He also studied at the School of Journalism and Television in England.

== Career ==
Edochie appearing in a commercial for Wikipedia

Edochie's love for the performing arts started early enough while he was a student of St. John's College in Kaduna. He was just 15 years old in 1962 when he dramatized aspects of William Shakespeare's "The Merchant of Venice". This early theatrical experience coincided with a period when English literature, including Shakespeare, was a standard component of secondary education in Nigeria's early post-independence era. In 1967 at the age of 20 Edochie went into broadcasting, joining Eastern Nigeria Broadcasting Service (ENBS), which would later become Anambra Broadcasting Service (ABS) as a junior programs assistant and subsequently, over the years, rose through the ranks, eventually being elevated to the level of a director. He was Director of Programs but doubled as Deputy Managing Director and occasionally acting as Managing Director. He quit Anambra Broadcasting Service (ABS) because the government decided to politicize the affairs of their FM station, thereby resulting in the entire management being asked to move out, including him. He was to be the immediate successor to the MD but had to leave and enroll into the movie industry. Prior to that, he had landed his first professional acting role in the television adaptation of Things Fall Apart, which aired on The Nigerian Television Authority (NTA) in 1987 as the main protagonist "Okonkwo". The BBC which had partnered with the NTA to produce the adaptation sent a delegation to interview him about his exceptional portrayal.

In 2005, the Actors Guild of Nigeria placed Edochie and several other actors, including Genevieve Nnaji, Omotola Jalade Ekeinde, Nkem Owoh, Ramsey Nouah, Stella Damasus Aboderin, and Richard Mofe Damijo, on a one-year ban from filming after they were said to have been collecting huge fees from producers due to their perceived A-list celebrity status.

== Personal life ==
Edochie is married to Josephine Edochie. They have six children. He is a practicing Catholic.

In 2009, he was kidnapped and later released by his captors, unharmed.

In September 2017, Edochie endorsed the Wikimedia movement in Nigeria by appearing in a video to increase awareness and use of Wikipedia among the older generations.

== Awards ==
Edochie was honoured with the African Film Legend award at the African Film Festival (TAFF) in 2020.

== Filmography ==
- Heavy Battle (2008) as Chief
- Test Your Heart (2008)
- Greatest Harvest (2007) as Asika
- Secret Pain (2007) as Douglas
- Fair Game (2006) as Tamuno Jacobs
- Holy Cross (2006)
- Lacrima (2006)
- Living with Death (2006) as Mr. Harrison
- Passage of Kings (2006) as Akatakpo
- Simple Baby (2006) as Nze Jacob
- Zoza (2006) as King
- Azima (2005)
- Baby Girl (2005)
- End of Money (2005) as Okagbue
- Living in Tears (2005)
- Never End (2005) as Igwe Omekaokwulu
- No More War (2005)
- Ola... the Morning Sun (2005)
- Price of Ignorance (2005)
- The Price of Love: Life Is Beautiful (2005)
- Sacred Tradition (2005) as Igwe Ebube
- The Tyrant (2005)
- Across the Niger (2004)
- Coronation (2004)
- Dogs Meeting (2004) as Anacho
- Dons in Abuja (2004)
- The Heart of Man (2004)
- King of the Jungle (2004)
- Love from Above (2004)
- My Desire (2004)
- Negative Influence (2004)
- The Staff of Odo (2004)
- St. Michael (2004)
- Above Death: In God We Trust (1999)
- Arrows (2003)
- Billionaire's Club (2003) as Billion
- Egg of Life (2003) as Igwe
- Honey (2003)
- Love & Politics (2003)
- Miserable Wealth (2003)
- The Omega (2003)
- Onunaeyi: Seeds of Bondage (2003)
- Rejected Son (2003)
- Selfish Desire (2003)
- Super Love (2003) as Okagbue
- Tears in the Sun (2003)
- Tunnel of Love (2003)
- When God Says Yes (2003) as Okeke
- Battle Line (2002)
- My Love (2002)
- Tears & Sorrows (2002) as Chief Okoye
- Greedy Genius (2001)
- Holy Ghost Fire (2001)
- Terrible Sin (2001)
- Light & Darkness (2001)
- Oduduwa (2000)
- Sins of the Father (2000)
- Set-Up (2000)
- Chain Reaction (1999)
- Lost Kingdom (1999)
- Narrow Escape (1999) as Odumodu
- Living in Darkness (1999)
- Rituals (1997)
- Nightmare (1997)
- Things Fall Apart (1987), TV series
- Last Ofalla (2002)
- Lion throne
- Lion of Africa
- Igodo (1999)
- Evil Men (1998)
- Monkey chop banana
- Idemili (2014) as Igwe
- 50 days with Christ
- Mummy Why (2016) as Elizabeth's Father
- John and John (2017)
- Trials of Ma'pe (2018) as Uncle Wilson
- Ebubedike (2021) as Ebubedike
- The Egg
- Unroyal (2020) as King Okrika
- Foreigner's God (2022) as Storyteller
- Lionheart (2018) as Chief Ernest Obiagu
- Mummy Why (2016) as Elizabeth's Father
- King Mabutu (2023) as Kasanga
- The Rising Sun (2023)
- Ifediche (2023)
