= Chiwetalu Agu =

Nigerian actor (born 1956)

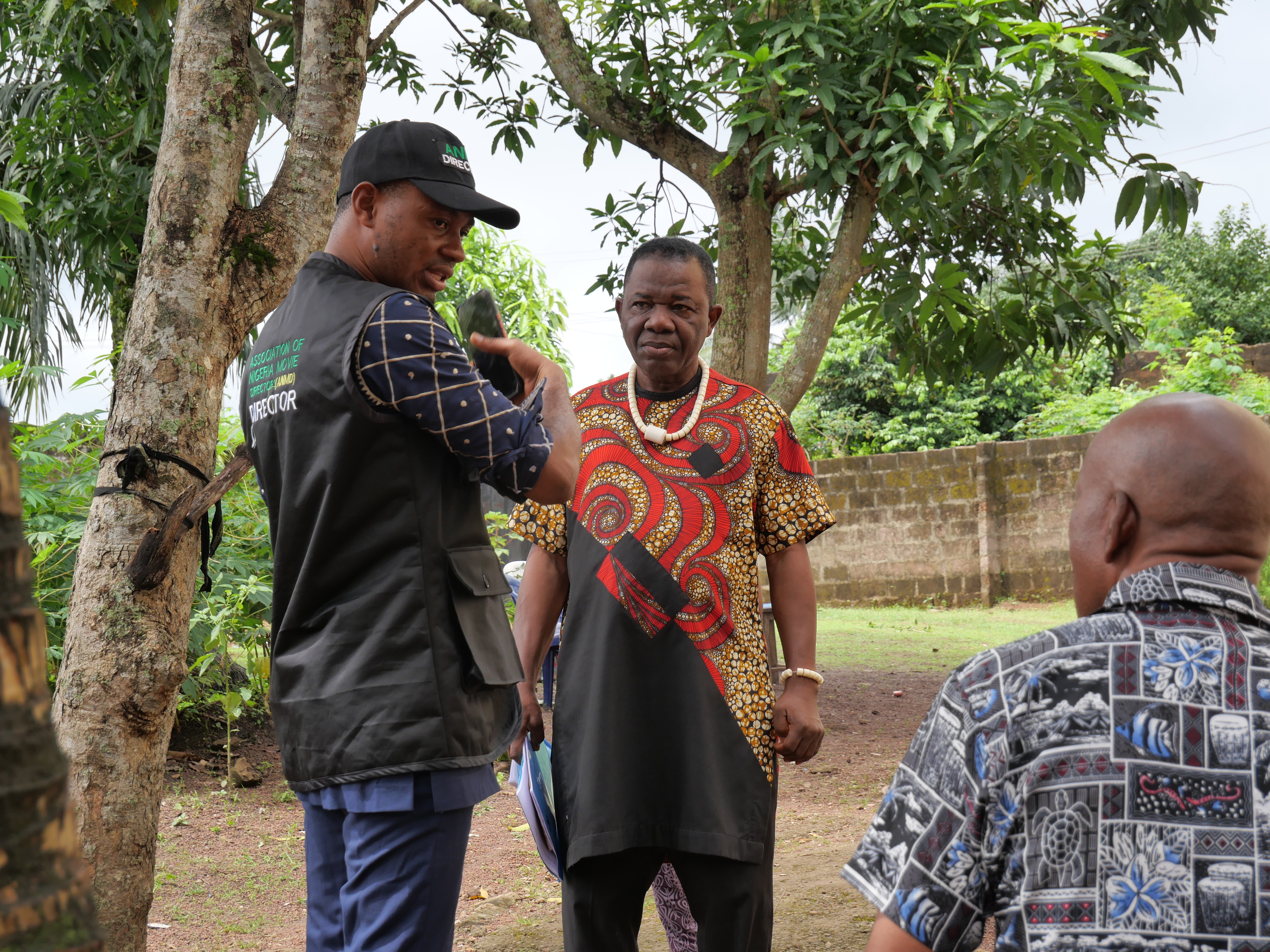
- Chiwetalu Agu on the set of Aghugho Anyaukwu
- Born: March 5, 1956 (age 70); Igbere, Bende, Abia State, Nigeria
- Other name: Okpantuecha
- Citizenship: Nigerian
- Occupation: Actor
- Spouse: Nkechi
- Children: 5
- Awards: Nollywood Movie Awards Best actor in an Indigenous movie

Chiwetalu Agu (born 5 March 1956) is a Nigerian actor. He won the 2012 Nollywood award for 'best actor in indigenous movie (non-English speaking language)'. His usage of specific language slangs, phrases, or clichés in many films has made him uniquely a household name in Nigeria and among Nollywood fans in general. While asserting that comic genres are a unique vehicle in projecting Nigerian culture globally as well as establishing the Nollywood brand, Agu is listed as one of the outstanding comedians who have contributed to the development of Nollywood comic genres by Prof. Femi Shaka of the University of Port Harcourt.

== Early years ==
Agu's versatility dates back to the transition of Nigerian television soap operas to Nollywood movies. Before the inception of Nollywood, about 31 years ago, television soap opera was the order of the day, and Agu featured in Nigerian Television Authority Channel 8 Enugu's Ikoro, produced by Joe Onyekwelu. He also featured in ETV Channel 50, now ESBS.

== Filmography ==
There is a record of at least about 150 movies in which Agu has been cast.

Year	Film	Role	Note
2002	Old School		
1986	Things Fall Apart		
	Ripples		
2008	Return of Justice By Fire		
2003	Traditional Marriage 1 & 2		
2002	Fire on the Mountain 1 & 2		
2002	Buried In Heaven 1 & 2	Nnanna	
2003	Price of the Wicked	Omenka	
	Dr. Thomas		with Sam Loco Efe
	The Priest Must Die		
	The Price of Sacrifice		
2003	The Catechist		
2003	Police Recruit		
	Sunrise 1 & 2		
2004	Old School 1-3		
	Honorable 1 & 2		
	Sounds of Love 1 & 2		
	Nkwocha		
2004	Across the Niger		
	The Plain Truth 1 7 2		
2007	Rhythm of Love 1 & 2		
	Church Man 1 & 2	Ukpabi	
	Holy Anger 1 & 2		
	Evil Twin		with Pete Edochie
2008	Beauty and the Beast 1-3	Uzoma	
2006	Royal Messengers 1 & 2		
2007	Royal Destiny 1 & 2		
2007	Burning kingdom 1 & 2		
	The Maidens		with Clarion Chukwurah
	Battle of the Gods 1 & 2		
2011	Greedy Brothers		With Sam Loco Efe, Judith Iwu, Francis Odega
2016	House of trouble		With Judith Iwu, Uche Odoputa
2018	The Ghost and the Tout	Chief Ajanaku	
2017	The Wedding Party 2		with Adesua Etomi
2019	Ordinary Fellows	Mr. Mgbu	a film by Lorenzo Menakaya
2019	She Is	chief Amosun	
2020	5G Network	Henry's Father	Drama
2021	The Cleanser		
2022	De jumbled	Alaka	directed by Benneth Nwankwo
2022	Aghugho Anyaukwu	Ubachi	directed by Uzoma Sunday Logicman
2022	Invaders		Directed by James Ugoejiofor
2023	Ada Omo Daddy	Uncle Ndubuisi	Directed by Kazim S. Adeoti, Mercy Aigbe and Akay Mason
2023	The Trade	Kidnap Driver	Crime / Drama

== Videography ==
Year	Title	Director	Ref
2016	Agbommma (cameo appearance)	Tchidi Chekere	

== Controversies ==
Agu has raised controversies with comments where he has said that he will act for a good price and described the sexual harassment alleged in Nollywood as an issue with a general phenomenon. He added "Nollywood actresses are well endowed". See also interview in The Daily Independent.

On 7 October 2021, Chiwetalu Agu was arrested by soldiers at Iweka Bridge in Onitsha, and spent a night in custody before the National President of the Actors Guild of Nigeria secured his release from the Nigerian Army after questioning. He was arrested after he was spotted wearing an outfit depicting the flag of Biafra.

== Awards and nominations ==
- In the first Nollywood Movie Awards in 2012: Agu was nominated for 'the best actor in indigenous movie for his role' in Nkwocha.
- Zulu African Film Academy Awards (ZAFAA London) 2011: Agu's role in The Maidens earned him nomination for 'the best supporting actor'.
- Agu was the winner in the first-ever Nollywood Movie Awards 2012 for 'the best actor in an indigenous movies with a non-English-speaking language' for his role in Nkwocha.
