= Clem Ohameze =

Nigerian actor (born 1965)

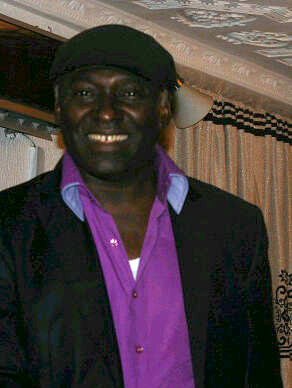
- Clem Ohameze at a party, August 2011
- Born: 27 June 1965 (age 61); Port Harcourt, Nigeria
- Other names: Clem, Shepard, Leader
- Citizenship: Nigeria
- Education: University of Port Harcourt; Buckingham University
- Occupation: Actor
- Years active: 1995-present

Clem Ohameze// is a veteran Nigerian actor with three decades in acting. Clem Ohameze started professional acting in 1995. But his breakthrough role was in 1999 when he featured in a big-budget movie titled ENDTIME. He has acted in over 500 movies in his 20-year career spanning 1995 to date and is set to feature in many more movies in the coming months.

== Background ==
Clem Ohameze was born on 27 June 1965 in Port Harcourt, Rivers State, Nigeria. He attended Holy Family College/Baptist High School for his secondary education. He moved on to study at the Institute of Management Technology, Enugu, Nigeria where he secured an Ordinary National Diploma (OND) in Mass Communication and then University of Port Harcourt where he graduated with a BSc. in Sociology and Anthropology in 1989. He also studied at the Buckingham University, London in 2010 and obtained a Masters in Preventive and Social Medicine.

== Personal life ==
Clem Ohameze is married to Chinwe Esther, and they have two children.

== Movie career ==
Ohameze is a member of the Actors Guild of Nigeria. He briefly broke away from acting between 2006 and 2010 to pursue other interests including politics. He has since returned to his movie career after the break. In 2010, Ohameze starred in the award-winning movie Ije: The Journey alongside Genevieve Nnaji and Omotola Jalade Ekeinde. In 2015, Ohameze starred in the movie Oloibiri as president.

== Political involvement ==
Ohameze stood for election to represent Ohaji-Egbema-Oguta Federal Constituency in Nigeria's Federal House of Representatives on the platform of the Peoples Democratic Party (PDP) in 2007. He however abandoned the pursuit over allegations of threat to his life. His car was attacked, his cousin was shot and killed during the incident. Ohameze relocated to London, United Kingdom. He intended to contest for an elective position in the 2015 general elections.

== Awards ==
Throughout his career he has received various awards some are:

- Best Actor in a leading role - African Movie Award
- Best Supporting Actor - Nigerian Entertainment Award
- Lifetime Achievement Award - Nollywood Movie Award

== Filmography ==
Year	Title	Role
1999	Endtime	Pastor Weaver
1999	Oganigwe	
1999	Asimo	
1999	The Visitor	
2000	The Last Burial	
2002	A Cry For Help	
2003	Endtime 2	Pastor Weaver
2003	Billionaire's Club	Okwute
2003	Bad Boys	
2004	The Maid	Mr. Williams
2004	Dogs Meeting	
2004	Escape	
2005	Nothing Nothing	Emenike
2005	Wedding Gift	
2005	Friends And Lovers	
2005	The Bank Manager	Chief Evans
2005	Wild Dog	
2005	Queen Of My Heart	
2005	The Prince	
2005	First Commandant	
2005	Knight of The Night	
2006	My Sister My Love	Dr. Francis
2006	Thanksgiving	George
2006	Heaven's Grace	
2006	The World Of Riches	Bob
2006	Strange Love	
2006	The Final Days	
2010	Ije: The Journey	Papa Opara
2013	Stigma	Pastor
2014	Native Fowl	Obinna
2015	Oloibiri	President
2021	Tales of Zozo	Gerald
2021	The Anomalous	Dr Chukwudi Ikenna
