= John Okafor =

Nigerian actor (1961–2024)

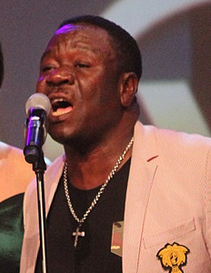
- Okafor in 2014
- Born: John Ikechukwu Okafor; 17 October 1961; Umunekwu, Eastern Region, Nigeria
- Died: 2 March 2024 (aged 62); Lekki, Lagos State, Nigeria
- Burial place: Amuri, Nkanu West Local Government Area, Enugu State
- Other name: Mr. Ibu
- Education: Institute of Management and Technology, Enugu
- Occupations: Actor; comedian; influencer
- Years active: 1978–2020

John Ikechukwu Okafor (17th October 1961 – 2nd March 2024), popularly known as Mr. Ibu, was a Nigerian actor and comedian. He appeared in over 200 Nollywood films including those from the Mr. Ibu series. He’s widely regarded as one of the funniest comic actors in Africa as his popularity spreads across, West, East and South Africa.

== Life and career ==
Okafor was born on 17th October 1961. He was from Umunekwu in Nigeria's former Eastern Region (now in Nkanu West L.G.A., Enugu State). After elementary school and the death of his father in 1974, Okafor moved to Sapele to stay with his brother. In Sapele, he did menial jobs so he could send himself to school and support his family. Okafor then worked as a hairstylist, ventured into photography and also worked in a company that produced crates. After secondary school, he was admitted into the College of Education, Yola, but pulled out due to financial difficulties. He later enrolled in the Institute of Management and Technology (IMT), Enugu.

Okafor was known as "Nigeria's Borat" and in 2012, described homosexuality in Nollywood as akin to a virus, saying "If there is any way in this world that people can make them stop it or kill it, please do it." Okafor also ventured into music for a short period of time. On 15 October 2020, he released his songs titled "This girl" and "Do you know".

== Personal life ==
Before his acting career, Okafor was a boxer, football coach, and karate practitioner. He was married twice in his lifetime. He has more than 10 children. His second wife, Stella Maris Okafor had three children with him, one of whom is deceased.

His son Daniel and adopted daughter Jasmine were accused of hacking Okafor's phone and stealing $60,700 from him. They were arrested in January 2024. In 2012 he called for an end in homosexuality describing it to be like a virus.

=== Illness and death ===
In October 2023, Okafor revealed that he was suffering from an ailment that threatened to make it necessary to amputate one of his legs. He said he was struck by the problem while on a movie set with other Nollywood actors. He appealed to his fans and the public for prayers and financial assistance to cover his medical bills. He also shared a video of himself lying in a hospital bed, expressing his fear of losing his leg. The Abubakar Bukola Saraki Foundation, which was established by the former Senate President of Nigeria, paid off Okafor's entire medical expenses as of 18 October 2023. The foundation also stated that Okafor still required a lot of financial assistance to sustain him in the hospital and for his travel abroad for further treatment.

In November 2023, Okafor underwent a leg amputation after suffering from an illness that required seven surgeries. His family said the amputation was done to keep him alive and increase his chances of recovery.

Okafor died at Evercare Hospital in Lagos, Nigeria on 2 March 2024 at the age of 62 as a result of cardiac arrest. The burial took place in his home town on Friday 28 June 2024. Following his death, his adopted daughter Jasmine renamed his million-follower TikTok account to her own name and deleted all videos that did not feature her.

== Filmography ==
Actor

- Coffin Producers
- Husband Suppliers
- International Players
- Vuga (2000; also production manager)
- Issakaba (2001)
- Mr. Ibu (2004)
- Mr. Ibu and His Son
- Mr. Ibu 2 (2005)
- Mr. Ibu in London (2005) as Ibu
- Police Recruit (2003)
- 9 Wives (2005) as Onuwa
- Four Forty (2006) as Okukusek
- Store Keeper (2006) as Innocent
- Ibu in Prison (2006)
- Bafana Bafana (2007) as Mazie
- Keziah (2007) as Cletus
- Desperate Search (2007) as Job
- Most Wanted Kidnappers (2010) as Akawo
- Sherikoko (2010) as Highjack
- Open and Close (2011) as Okwuti
- Ibu in Sierra Leone (2013) as Ibu
- Chinbundu (2014) as Okoro
- Love Wahala (2014) as Thomas
- Plantain Girl (2015) as Amadi
- London Fever (2017)
- Prince of Deceit (2017) as Emeka
- The Eve (2018) as Uncle Festus
- The Album (2020) as Steve Eboh

== See also ==
- List of Nigerian actors
