= Amaechi Muonagor =

Nigerian actor and producer (1956–2024)

- Born: 20 August 1962; Obosi, Anambra State, Nigeria
- Died: 24 March 2024 (aged 61)
- Education: University of Nigeria, Nsukka
- Occupation: Actor
- Years active: 1989–2024
- Children: 4

Amaechi Muonagor // (20 August 1962 – 24 March 2024) was a veteran Nigerian actor, comedian, and movie producer. He was nominated for the 2017 Africa Magic Viewers' Choice Awards for Best Actor. He joined the Nigerian movie industry. Nollywood in 1989 and had starred in many movies, including Taboo 1&2 (1993), Aki and Pawpaw, Karishika (1998), Aki na Ukwa (2002), and Igodo (1999).

== Early life ==
Amaechi Muonagor was born in Obosi, a village in Idemili North Local Government Area, Anambra State. He attended St. Mary's Primary School, Obosi, and Oraifite Grammar School before he furthered his education at the University of Nigeria, Nsukka (UNN) in Enugu State, where he studied economics and graduated in 1987.

== Career ==
In 1989, Amaechi started working for NAN (News Agency of Nigeria). He left his job a few years later for an acting role in his first movie as 'Akunatakasi' in the Nigerian movie Taboo 1. In 1999, Amaechi Muonagor starred in the movie Igodo, a movie that was known in its time. This movie earned Amaechi a nomination for Best Supporting Actor at the Africa Movie Academy Awards.

Amaechi Muonagor's popularity soared in 2003 with his performance in the Nollywood iconic comedy "Aki na Ukwa," alongside Chinedu Ikedieze (Aki) and Osita Iheme (Pawpaw). This film achieved great success in Nigeria and beyond, gaining over 11 million views on YouTube years after its release. Amaechi's role earned him a nomination for Best Actor in Comedy at the Africa Magic Viewers Choice Awards.

Amaechi, among other Nollywood stars like Chinyere Winifred and Ebere Okaro, joined Dr. Chris Eke of Word and Spirit Assembly, Ijegun Lagos as he marked his 40th birthday back in 2015, celebrating it with prison inmates, as well as with children at the Hearts of Gold Children's Hospice orphanage home. In 2020, Amaechi said sexual harassment is not peculiar to Nollywood, as it happens in every profession.

== Illness and death ==
In 2016, it was reported that Amaechi was suffering from diabetes and had left the film industry. In 2023, he suffered from a stroke that resulted in partial paralysis of his left leg. On 24 March 2024, Amaechi died of kidney failure at the age of 61.

== Filmography ==
- Taboo 1&2 (1993)
- Blood Money (1997)
- Rituals (1997)
- Oracle (1998) as Igwe
- Karishika (1998) as Minister Jonathan
- Igodo (1999)
- The Last Burial (2000)
- Issakaba (2000) as Igwe
- State of Emergency (2000)
- Dirty Game (2000) as Bola
- Vanity Upon Vanity (2000) as Egwu
- Executive Crime (2000) as Chief Inspector
- Married to a Witch (2001) as Papa
- Aki na Ukwa (2002) as Mbakwe
- 2 Rats (2003) as Ndukwe
- Charge & Bail (2003) as Jephtah
- Cold War (2005) as Odimba
- Desperate Women (2006) as Jude
- End of Evil Doers (2007) as Igwe Onyima
- His Last Action (2008) as David
- Sincerity (2009) as Chief Ezekwe
- Without Goodbye (2009) as Chief Rufus
- Most Wanted Kidnappers (2010) as Utu
- Jack and Jill (2011) as Amadi
- Village Rascal (2012)
- August Meeting (2012) as Mazi Igwemba
- Ihite Kingdom (2014) as Alfred
- Evil World (2015)
- Ugonma (2015)
- Code of Silence (2015)
- Spirits (2016)
- Rosemary (2016)
- The Bushman I Love (2017) as Chief Mmili
- High Stakes (2019) as Pius
- My Village People (2021) as Ndio
- Aki and Pawpaw (2021) as Mazi Mbakwe
- Fishers of Wealth (2023) as Obiakor
