= Patience Ozokwor =

Nigerian actress (born 1958)

- Born: 14 September 1958 (age 68); Ngwo, Enugu, Nigeria
- Other names: Mama G, G for general
- Education: Institute of Management and Technology, Enugu
- Occupations: Actress, musician
- Years active: 1999–present
- Children: 10
- Website: patienceozokwo.com

Patience Ozokwor // (born 14 September 1958), popularly known as Mama G, is a Nigerian actress, singer, and filmmaker. Regarded as one of the most distinctive and enduring figures of Nollywood, she became widely known for her portrayals of villainous, domineering, and antagonistic characters, particularly wicked mothers, mothers-in-law, and formidable matriarchs. Emerging to prominence during the formative years of Nigeria's home-video cinema, Ozokwor became closely associated with the archetype of the female antagonist and established a screen persona that made her one of the most recognisable actresses in Nigerian popular culture. She won Africa Movie Academy Awards's Best Supporting Actress in 2012 and 2013. In 2014, Ozokwor was among the top 100 Nigerians honoured by the government to celebrate the amalgamation of the northern and southern protectorates for their contributions to the nation's cultural life.

On 20 May 2023, she received the Merit Award at the 2023 Africa Magic Viewers' Choice Awards.

== Early life ==
Ozokwor was born in the village of Amaebo, Ngwo in present-day Enugu State, Nigeria, and attended Abimbola Gibson Memorial School in Lagos. Ozokwor developed a passion for acting in primary school, where she took part in various stage plays. She later attended the Institute of Management and Technology Enugu (ESUT), where she obtained a degree in fine and applied arts. Before starting as an actress, she was part of a radio drama.

== Career ==
Ozokwor worked as an announcer and broadcaster with Radio Nigeria before becoming an actress. She rose to fame with her role in the 1999 film Authority, and her first TV drama was a soap opera titled Someone Cares on the Nigerian Television Authority (NTA). Since her breakthrough, she has appeared in over 100 films.

She starred in the Mo Abudu Netflix films Chief Daddy (2018) and Chief Daddy 2: Going for Broke (2022) as Madam Pat.

In 2026, Ozokwor starred in the Dammy Twitch-directed romantic comedy Call of My Life alongside Uzoamaka Power and Nkem Owoh. The film earned 628 million Naira within 6 weeks of release and entered the list of Nollywood's Highest-grossing Films.

== Personal life ==
Ozokwor got married at the age of 19, and she became a widow in 2000 following her husband's death from a terminal disease. She has three biological children and seven adopted children, all of whom bear her name. She also has several grand children. Ozokwor is an ordained evangelist.

== Selected filmography ==
Year	Films	Role
1999	Authority	
1999	Ijele	Aku
2000	Oganigwe	Lolo
2001	Desperadoes	
2001	The Eliminators (Amandianeze)	
2001	Greedy Genius	
2001	Mothering Sunday	Eluwa
2001	Terrible Sin	
2001	Ukwa	Susana
2002	$1 (One Dollar)	
2002	Christian Marriage	
2002	My Girl	
2002	Final Clash	
2002	Fire on the Mountain	
2002	Miracle	
2002	Okwu Na Uka	
2002	Old School	
2002	Buried In Heaven	
2002	Pretender	
2002	Submission	
2002	Sunrise	
2002	The Vulture	
2003	2 Rats	
2003	Arrows	
2003	Billionaire's Club	Njideka
2003	Blood Sister	Ulumma
2003	By His Grace	
2003	The Cross of Love	Uloma
2003	Cry No More	Agues
2003	Deceiver	
2003	Emotional Crack	Magdalene
2003	Evil Woman	
2003	Forever Yours	
2003	Last Miracle	
2003	Market Sellers	
2003	Mr. Trouble	
2003	No Nonsense	Adanne
2003	Onunaeyi: Seeds of Bondage	
2003	Princess Buttem	
2003	Price of the Wicked	Ijenu
2003	Private Sin	Mrs. Ejiofor
2003	The Storm Is Over	
2003	Under Fire	
2003	Women Affair	
2004	Annabel	Amelia
2004	Eyin Oka	
2004	Fateful Love	
2004	Heritage	
2004	Indulgence	
2004	Love After Love	Abigail
2004	Love & Pride	
2004	Mama-G in America	
2004	Mama, I Will Die for You	
2004	Millionaire's Daughter	
2004	Mothers-in-Law	
2004	My First Love	
2004	My Mother My Marriage	
2004	My Woman	
2004	Old School 2 & 3	
2004	Police Woman	
2004	The Staff of Odo	
2005	Women in Power	Joyce
2006	Last Dance	Lucia
2007	Alice My First Lady	Amaoge
2008	Husband My Foot	Rose
2009	Missing Child	Owakwe
2010	Power of a Kiss	Mrs. George
2011	Open & Close	Charity
2012	Turning Point	Mrs. Afolabi
2013	Cry of a Witch	Mma
2014	Idemili	Queen
2015	Overseas	Amaka
2017	Days of Tears	Ndudi
2017	Wedding party 2	Adanna
2018	Chief Daddy	Madam Pat
2019	Knock out	
2019	Don't Get Mad Get Even	Mama Caro
2020	Bad Comments	Mama Frank
2020	Utterances	Mrs Ozobia
2020	Scars of a Mother	Fresher
2021	The Ghost and the Tout Too	Mama G
2021	The Ghost killer	
2021	Depths of Despair	Agatha
2022	Cake	Tomiwa's Mum
2022	Chief Daddy 2: Going for Broke	Madam Pat
2022	Be with me	Agnes
2022	Battle on Buka Street	
2022	Hila	Grandma
2022	Wedding in Nigeria	
2023	Mother-In-Law	Mama Sallia
2023	The Scuffle	
2023	Bigger Fish	Liz' Mama
2024	This Very Christmas	Caro
2024	Everybody Loves Jenifa	Mrs Agnes
2025	Son of the Soil	
2026	Call of My Life	Mama Soluchi
