= Liz Da-Silva =

Nigerian actress and film producer (born 1978)

- Born: Elizabeth Omowunmi Tekovi Da-Silva; 10 May 1978 (age 48); Obalende, Lagos State
- Education: Lagos State University
- Occupation: Actress
- Years active: 2004–present
- Children: 1

Elizabeth Omowunmi Tekovi Da-Silva (born 10 June 1978) is a Nigerian actress and movie producer of Togolese descent featuring predominantly in the Nigerian Yoruba movie industry. In 2016, Da-Silva was nominated for City People Movie Award for Best Supporting Actress of the Year (Yoruba) at City People Entertainment Awards and in 2018, won the award for Best Actress in a Supporting Role at Best of Nollywood Awards.

== Early life and education ==
Da-Silva was born to Togolese parents residing in Nigeria. She was precisely born in a geographical area known as Obalende in Lagos State where her parents resided and where she spent her childhood. By the virtue of her birth, she enjoys privileges of a Nigerian citizen. In an interview with a Nigerian print media The Punch, she described Lagos as her home and stated in the interview that she was from a polygamous home. Da-Silva attended Ireti Grammar School for secondary school education and in bid to obtain a college degree proceeded to Lagos State University and eventually graduated with a B.Sc. degree from the institution of higher learning.

== Career ==
Da-Silva in an interview disclosed that her attraction to the Nigerian Yoruba movie industry began whilst in secondary school and subsequently she started to get involved in school plays. Da-Silva In an interview with The Punch media press stated that she officially debuted into the Nigerian Yoruba movie industry in 2004 through the help of Iyabo Ojo. Da-Silva's career as an actress rose to thelimelight after she featured as notable characters in two movies; the first titled Wakati Meta by Wale Lawal and a movie titled Omidan by Iyabo Ojo.

Da-Silva in 2012, debuted her career as a movie producer with a movie titled Mama Insurance which featured Ayo Mogaji, Lanre Hassan, Iyabo Ojo, Ronke Ojo and Doris Simeon.

== Awards and nominations ==
| Year | Award | Category | Result | Ref |
|---|---|---|---|---|
| 2018 | City People Entertainment Awards | Best Supporting Actress of the Year (Yoruba) | Nominated | |
| 2018 | Best of Nollywood Awards | Best Supporting Actress –Yoruba | Won | |

== Influence ==
Da-Silva named, Bukky Wright as her role model in the Nigerian Yoruba movie industry and stated that she had influenced, her acting style significantly.

== Personal life ==
Da-Silva is a Nigerian by virtue of birth and a Togolese because her parents are citizens of Togo. Da-Silva has described, Lagos state as her home but maintains, she still has connections to her extended family in Togo. Da-Silva in 2013 converted from Christianity to Islam.

== Selected filmography ==
- Ore l’ore Nwoto (2007)
- Omidan
- Desire
- Itanje
- Mama Insurance
- Alebu kan
- Mawo’badan
- Tasere
- Mama Insurance (2012)
- Asife (2016) as Jumoke
- Alase (2020)
- Iku Alhaji (2021) as Alhaja Limota
- Ololade (2023 TV Series)

== See also ==
- List of Nigerian actresses
