= Omotara Johnson =

Nigerian crime drama film

- Directed by: Muhydeen S. Ayinde; Wale Ilebiyi
- Written by: Bukky Wright; Wale Ilebiyi
- Produced by: Bukky Wright
- Starring: Bukky Wright; Chidi Mokeme; Toyin Alausa; Femi Brainard; Oga Bello; Akin Lewis; Aina Gold; Wale Ilebiyi; Ayo Adesanya; Eniola Badmus; Yomi Fash-Lanso; Lanre Hassan; Iyabo Ojo
- Release date: 15 February 2008 (Nigeria)
- Country: Nigeria
- Language: Yoruba

Omotara Johnson is a Nigerian crime drama film produced by actress and filmmaker Bukky Wright. The film stars Wright in the title role, alongside Chidi Mokeme, Toyin Alausa, Femi Brainard, Adebayo Salami and Akin Lewis. It was directed by Muyideen Sasilu and Wale Ilebiyi. The film spawned several sequels, including Omotara Johnson 2, Omotara Johnson 3, Omotara Johnson 4 and The Return of Omotara Johnson, the latter of which was released in 2026.

== Plot ==
The film centres on Omotara Johnson, a woman with a deep hatred for men and an overwhelming desire to get whatever she wants, regardless of the consequences. She becomes obsessed with Tunde Bamgbopa, the fiancé of her best friend, Kemi Ajibodu. Her pursuit of Tunde sets off a chain of betrayal, manipulation, and violent confrontations, eventually leading to imprisonment. Through the intervention of a powerful chief, she secures a pardon and is released from prison. However, her attempt to rebuild her life introduces further complications as she confronts the consequences of her previous actions.

== Cast and characters ==
- Bukky Wright as Omotara Johnson
- Chidi Mokeme as Tunde Bamgbopa
- Toyin Alausa as Kemi Ajibodu
- Oga Bello as Oloye Olowolagba
- Akin Lewis as Bode
- Aina Gold as Alaga Ile Ise
- Wale Ilebiyi as Otelemuye
- Ayo Adesanya as Oyin
- Eniola Badmus as Wule Bantu
- Yomi Fash-Lanso as Oladele
- Lanre Hassan as Oladele's Mother
- Iyabo Ojo as Radeke
- Femi Brainard

== Production and release ==
The film was produced by Bukky Wright, who also starred in the lead role.

The film premiered at Matinos Events Hall in Ikeja, Lagos, on 15 February 2008. On 29 March 2009, Modern Ghana confirmed that the movie would premiere at a festival in Ghana.

== Sequel ==
In 2008, three sequels, Omotara Johnson 2, Omotara Johnson 3, and Omotara Johnson 4, were released. Fifteen years later, the franchise continued with The Return of Omotara Johnson, which premiered in Nigerian cinemas on 10 July 2026. Directed by Adeoluwa Owu, the film sees Bukky Wright 6reprise her role as Omotara Johnson, alongside Timini Egbuson, Richard Mofe-Damijo, Shaffy Bello, Chidi Mokeme, and Nse Ikpe-Etim.
