= Arinzo =

- Produced by: Iyabo Ojo
- Release date: 2013
- Country: Nigeria
- Language: Yoruba

Arinzo is a 2013 Nigerian film produced by Iyabo Ojo. Ghollywood and Nollywood actors were featured in the film, and it was shot in both Ghana and Nigeria.

== Synopsis ==
The movie is about two sisters whose relationship deteriorates as one sister is a police officer, whilst the other is involved in robberies. Over the course of the movie, the sisters become enemies due to their different stations in life.

== Cast ==
- Vivienne Achor
- Blankson
- Ekson Smith Asante
- Anthar Laniyan
- Femi Branch
- Yinka Quadri
- Muka Ray
- Ayo Mogaji
- Bukky Wright
- Doris Simeon
- Iyabo Ojo

== Awards ==
Iyabo Ojo was nominated for the YMAA award as the leading actor.

== See also ==
- Toyin Abraham
- Liz Da-Silva
