= Mama Insurance =

- Directed by: Bayo Tijani
- Produced by: Liz Da-Silva
- Starring: Fathia Balogun; Iyabo Ojo; Ayo Mogaji; Lanre Hassan; Liz Da-Silva; Odusanya; Doris Simeon
- Release date: 2012
- Country: Nigeria
- Language: Yoruba

Mama Insurance is a 2012 Nigerian film about a landlord who is harsh on her tenants. It was shot on Victoria Island. It was directed by Bayo Tijani and produced by Liz Da-Silva.

== Cast ==
- Fathia Balogun
- Iyabo Ojo
- Ayo Mogaji
- Lanre Hassan
- Liz Da-Silva
- Odusanya
- Doris Simeon

== Synopsis ==
The movie is about a strict landlady whose tenants are all women of different profession and lifestyle. Her love for one of them caused her trouble as she is a fraudster.

== Award ==
Ayo Mogaji was nominated for the best actress in the supporting role for the film at the YMAA held in 2014.

== See also ==
- Fathia Williams
- Odunlade Adekola
- Shola Arikusa (film)
