= Ayitale =

2013 Nigerian drama film

- Directed by: Adebayo Salami
- Produced by: Adebayo Salami
- Starring: Adebayo Salami; Femi Adebayo; Bimbo Akintola
- Release date: 13 January 2013
- Running time: 98 minutes
- Country: Nigeria
- Language: Yoruba

Ayitale is a 2013 Nigerian Yoruba film produced and directed by Adebayo Salami. It received four nominations at the 2013 Best of Nollywood Awards.

== Cast ==
- Femi Adebayo as Aderope
- Adebayo Salami
- Bimbo Akintola as Kemi
- Joke Muyiwa as Abeni
- Lanre Hassan as Ajoke
- Iyabo Oko
- Adewale Elesho as Akanmu
- Toyin Adegbola as Sade
- Razaq Adewale as Aworo
- Tunbosun Odunsi
