= Oluwole Ogundare =

Nigerian film director (born 1984)

Oluwole Ogundare Ezekiel
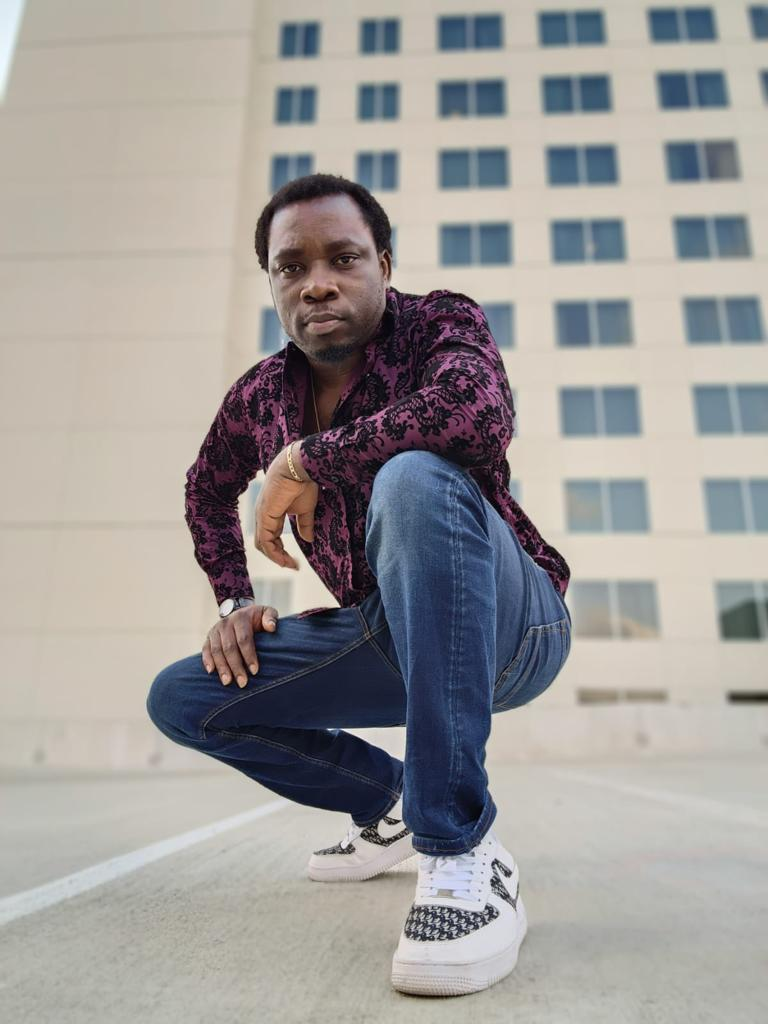
- Born: Oluwole Ogundare Ezekiel; 24 August 1984 (age 42); Lagos
- Other name: Wole Ogundare
- Education: Osun State Polytechnic
- Occupations: Filmmaker; Creative director; Music video director
- Years active: 2014 – Present

Oluwole Ogundare Ezekiel commonly known as Wole Ogundare (born 24 August 1984) is a Nigerian film director, Creative Director, music video director and producer.

== Early life ==
Wole Ogundare was born in Lagos, Nigeria in August 1984. He attended Jelly Las Nursery and Primary School and attending Folbim High School, Lagos. He later proceeded to Obafemi Awolowo University where studied Information Technology and Osun State Polytechnicobtained a BSc in mass communication .

== Career ==
Ogundare first directed project was in 2016 for the adventures Nigerian series " Lola the series" produced by Celine Dimas. In 2020, he directed the Nigerian movie Violated (a short film about Rape and Abuse) which starred Seun Sean Jimoh and Lekan Ogunjobi.

== Partial filmography ==
=== Film ===
Year	Film	Role	Notes	Ref.
2016	Lola The Series	Director	Television Series	
2020	Violated	Director, Co- Producer, Editor	Short film	
2021	Web	Director, Producer, Editor	Feature Film	
2021	Ameriah	Creative Director	Yoruba Drama	
2026	The Return of Omotara Johnson	Creative Director/ Co-producer / Co-writer	Crime Drama	

== Selected music videography (as director) ==
- 2016: "Bouce it remix" by MC Galaxy ft Beniton X Double Dose
- 2018: "Stamina Remix" by Korede Bello X Gyptian X Young D X DJ Tunez
- 2016: "Hello" by MC Galaxy
- 2016: "Shupe For Ayade" by MC Galaxy
- 2019: "Koloko" by BM X Nestreya
- 2019: "Live Your Life" by Ms. Bodega X Gyptian X MC Galaxy X Neza X Neil Bajayo X Young D
- 2018: "This Woman" by Maxi Priest X Yemi Alade
- 2019: "Body Work" by Young D X Harmonize X Reekado Banks
- 2016: "Snap O (Snapchat) " by MC Galaxy X Neza X Mucicmanty X Kelli Pyle
- 2017: "Sokutu" by Koffi X Small Doctor X Qdot X QDot
- 2024: "I Made It" by Harmonize feat. Bobby Shmurda & Bien

== Awards and nominations ==
Year	Award	Category	Result	Ref
2020	African Entertainment Awards USA	Creative Director of the year	Won	
2021	African Entertainment Awards USA	Creative Director of the year	Won	
