= Mama Deola =

Nigerian Comedian

Folagade Banks
- Also known as: Mama Deola
- Born: Abiri Tobi Folagade; Nigeria
- Genres: Afrobeats
- Occupations: Actor; Skitmaker; Comedian
- Years active: 2020–present
- Website: instagram.com/folagade_banks.com

Folagade Banks, also known as Mama Deola, is a Nigerian content creator, actor, and digital storyteller. Folagade is popularly known for his character “Mama Deola”, a humorous portrayal of a typical Nigerian mother, which he shares through social media skits. His work focus on preserving cultural narratives and providing insights into everyday African life.

== Early life and education ==
Folagade is a graduate of Geography from the Obafemi Awolowo University.

== Career ==
Folagade's career as a comic storyteller began during the COVID-19 pandemic, as a short skits on Instagram before it evolved into a full career. His content is characterized by cultural authenticity, wit, and a focus on everyday realities in Nigerian households, resonating with audience.

He has engaged in acting roles, which include appearances in the film The Eve (2019) and the Africa Magic series Okoto (2021). Folagade has collaborated with some other Nigerian creatives, including Omotola Jalade Ekeinde, Sola Sobowale, Richard Mofe-Damijo (RMD), Bukky Wright, Kizz Daniel, and PSquare.

== Awards and recognition ==
Mama Deola has been a recipient of numerous awards like, Trendupp Award for The Force of Comedy Skits, recognizing him as the most engaging and influential content creator in Nigeria's comedy niche from March 2024 to March 2025. 2024 Future Awards Africa Nominee Pulse Nigeria named him the number one Top Instagram Comedian. Dataleum ranked him as Nigeria's number one male skit maker for the first and second quarters of 2025, highlighting his impact with over 72 million views and numerous viral collaborations.
