= Lota Chukwu =

Nigerian actress (born 1989)

- Born: Ugwu Lotachukwu Jacinta Obianuju Amelia; 29 November 1989 (age 36); Nsukka, Enugu State, Nigeria
- Education: University of Benin
- Occupations: Actress, writer
- Years active: 2014–present
- Notable work: The Arbitration

Ugwu Lotachukwu Jacinta Obianuju Amelia// (born 29 November 1989), is a Nigerian actress popularly known as Lota Chukwu// . She gained popularity after starring in popular Nigerian television series Jenifa's Diary, alongside Funke Akindele, Juliana Olayode and Falz, in which she plays the role of "Kiki", a friend of the lead character, Jenifa. She is also a yoga fitness enthusiast.

== Early life ==
Chukwu was born on 29 November 1989 in Nsukka, Enugu State, located in the southeastern region of Nigeria. She spent most of her childhood in Benin City, the capital city of Edo State, south-south Nigeria. Lota is the youngestof four children. She studied Agricultural Economics and Extension Service at the University of Benin and subsequently trained at the Royal Arts Academy in Lagos, Nigeria.

== Career ==
Before acting, Chukwu was a model and participated in the 2011 edition of The Most Beautiful Girl in Nigeria representing Yobe State, a state in northeastern Nigeria. She started acting in 2011 but gained popularity after appearing on Jenifa's Diary, playing the role of Kiki. She has also starred in movies such as The Royal Hibiscus Hotel, Falling, Fine Girl, The Arbitration, Dognapped.

Chukwu was featured as the lead character in Reminisce's Ponmile video, and Aramide's Why So Serious video. She was also on set in the movie The Inkblot.

=== Lota Takes ===
In 2017, she announced the launch her food show Lota Takes, a cooking and lifestyle show that Expresses her love for food and nature The show has featured several Nigerian celebrities, including Adekunle Gold, Tosin Ajibade, Aramide and MC Galaxy.

== Filmography ==
=== Music videos ===
Year	Title	Artist	Ref
2017	"Ponmile"	Reminisce	
2017	"Why so serious"	Aramide	

=== TV shows ===
Year	Title	Role	Notes	Ref
2015-18	Jenifa's Diary	Kiki	Alongside Funke Akindele	
2015	Spotlight	Shiza	Alongside Desmond Elliot and Segun Arinze	
2017	Lota Takes	Herself	Cooking and lifestyle show	
2018	Ajoche	Oofuni	An Africa Magic original	
2020-21	Enakhe	Jacinta	An Africa Magic original	
2021	The Mystic River		Alongside Dele Odule, Jide Kosoko	

=== Movies ===
Year	Title	Role	Director	Ref
2026	Heaven must wait	Dorcas, a dedicated school teacher	Frederick Leonard	
2024	KALI	Kali	Ekene Som Mekwunye	
2023	No Wrong Choice		Blessing Oke Akambe	
2022	One Bad Turn	Michelle	Blessing Effiom Egbe	
2021	The Supervisor	Joan	Uyoyou Adia	
2021`	Entangle		Charles Uwagbai	
2021	Missing	Angela	Charles Uwagbai	
2021	That Other Side		Victor Sanchez Aghahowa	
2020	Faded lines		Okey Ifeanyi	
2020	When Life Happens	Betty	Okey Ifeanyi	
2020	The Perfect Plan	Sub Lead	Uzodinma Okpechi Chris Eneaji Eneng	
2020	Maybe Mine	Ene	Uzodinma Okpechi Chris Eneaji Eneng	
2020	Wind Chasers	Supporting Cast	Uzodinma Okpechi Chris Eneaji Eneng	
2020	Falling	Co-star	Niyi Akinmolayan	
2020	This Lady Called Life	Omo	Kayode Kasum	
2020	Small Bants	Short Tomi	Lota Chukwu	
2020	Karma is a Gangster		Stanley Obi	
2020	Unplugged		Emeka Madu	
2019	Executioner	Cynthia	Wale Rasaq	
2019	Void	Tina	Chris Eneaji Eneng	
2019	One Wish		Tchidi Chikere	
2019	Unlocked	Osinachi	Tope Alake	
2019	The Tea Room	Bianca	Okey Ifeanyi	
2018	The Kinsman	Nadia	Doris Ariole	
2018	Talior My Heart	Tochi	Charles Uwagbai	
2018	In Every Way	Mabel	Chris Eneaji Eneng	
2017	Dognapped	Sophia	Kayode Kasum	
2017	Displaced	Chisom	Charles Uwagbai	
2017	You, Me and the Guys		Esther Abah	
2017	Royal Hibiscus Hotel	Seyi	Ishaya Bako	
2016	Fine Girl	Lead	Uduak Isong Oguamanam	
2016	The Arbitration	Faridah	Niyi Akinmolayan	
2015	Spotlight Deadly Instinct Windchaser Falling	Shiza Valeria	Sunkanmi Adebayo Yemi Morafa Uzodinma Okpechi Niyi Akinmolayan	

== Awards and nominations ==
Year	Event	Prize	Result
2016	Scream All Youth Awards	Film Revelation of the Year (Female)	Nominated
2017	City People Entertainment Awards	Best New Actress of the Year (English)	Nominated.
