= Dagrin =

Nigerian rapper (1984-2010)

DaGrino

Background information
- Also known as: Barack O'Grin, Lyrical Werre, Fi mi le Jo.
- Born: Oladapo Olaitan Olaonipekun; 25 October 1984; Ogun State, Nigeria
- Origin: Ogun, Nigeria
- Died: 22 April 2010 (aged 25) Mushin, Lagos State, Nigeria
- Genre: Hip hop
- Occupations: Rapper, singer
- Instruments: Vocal, piano
- Years active: 1994–2010
- Label: Misofunyin Entertainment

Oladapo Olaitan Olaonipekun, also known as Dagrin (25 October 1984 – 22 April 2010), was a Nigerian rapper from Ogun, Nigeria. A film of his life entitled Ghetto Dreamz was produced in April 2011. He is recognized for paving the way for Yoruba rap in Nigeria. He is widely considered one of the greatest Nigerian rappers of all time.

== Early life ==
Olaonipekun's home was in Meiran, Alagbado, Lagos State.

== Career ==
He released his first studio album Still On The Matter in 2006-07. In 2009, He released his second studio album called C.E.O. (Chief Executive Omoita). In 2010 he was nominated for the Nigerian Entertainment Awards for Best Album (C.E.O.), Hottest Single "Pon Pon Pon", Best Rap Act and Best Collaboration with vocals. His album C.E.O. (Chief executive Omota English: Chief Executive Thug) won the Hip hop World Award 2010 for best rap album. From it came the singles "Pon Pon Pon", and "Kondo". Dagrin worked with other Nigerian artists such as Y.Q, 9ice, M.I, Iceberg Slim, Omobaba, Hyce_age Terry G, Ms Chief, Owen G, K01, code, MISTAR DOLLAR, TMD entertainment, Omawumi, Chudy K, Bigiano, and Konga. His third studio If I Die was released posthumously.

== Death ==
On Wednesday, 14 April 2010, Dagrin was driving back home around 3:00 AM when his Nissan Maxima 3.5 SE (2008) rammed into a stationary truck in front of Alakara Police station, off Agege motor road, Mushin, Lagos State. He was quickly rushed to the nearby Tai Solarin Hospital, Baba Olosha Bus stop, Mushin. Dagrin, who sustained a serious head injury, remained unconscious and was later transferred to the Intensive care unit of the Lagos University Teaching Hospital, Idi Abara, where doctors made serious efforts to save his life. He was operated upon but later had to be transferred to the private wing of the hospital. Dagrin remained unconscious under intensive care unit at the Lagos University Teaching Hospital until his death on Thursday, 22 April 2010 at 6:00 PM. He was 25 at the time of his death.

== Legacy ==
Da Grin was cited as one of the pioneers of dialect rap singers of Yoruba language and Pidgin in Nigeria. Nigerian journalist, Idoko Salihu of Premium Times stated that "Da Grin was a rapper who revolutionised the Nigerian rap industry, he infused English with his native dialect".

M.I. released "End of Time" tribute to Da Grin after the rapper's demise in 2010.'Nigerian All Stars' which included Sheyman, Ruggedman, Banky W, Omawunmi, Lord of Ajasa, Tony Tetuila and a host of others released "My Pain", a tribute to Da Grin after his death. Rapper Olamide released "Tribute to Dagrin" in 2011.

Musicians who regard Da Grin as influence on their careers includes Olamide, CDQ, Reminisce, Oladips, YQ Nito-P etc.

== Ghetto Dreamz ==
A film of his life Ghetto Dreamz, starring Trybson Dudukoko and Doris Simeon-Ademinokan as his girlfriend has been made and was released in April 2011.

== Discography ==
- Still On The Matter (2006)
- C.E.O (Chief Executive Omoita)(2009)
- If I Die (2011)
- Legends Never Die, Pt. 1(2023)

== Awards and nominations ==
=== Won ===
- 2010 Hip Hop World Awards – Best Rap Album

=== Nominated ===
- 2010 Hip Hop World Awards – Artiste of the Year
