= Joke Muyiwa =

Nigerian film actress (born 1963)

- Born: March 21, 1963 (age 63)
- Education: Sacred Heart Convent School, Ibadan; Baptist Grammar School, Ibadan; Obafemi Awolowo University, Ile Ife; University of Ibadan, Ibadan; Redeemer's University
- Occupations: Actress, lecturer
- Employer: Olabisi Onabanjo University

Joke Muyiwa (born 21 March 1963) is a Nigerian film actress, honorary chief, Ph.D. holder, and lecturer. She lectures in the department of Performing Arts at the Olabisi Onabanjo University. In 2018, Joke Muyiwa was conferred with Yeye Asa of Ago Iwoye chieftaincy title by HRM Oba Ebumawe of Ago Iwoye.

== Early life and career ==
Joke Muyiwa was born in Abeokuta, Ogun State, on 21 March 1963. She had her primary education at the Sacred Heart Convent School and for secondary school, she attended the Baptist Grammar School, both in Ibadan, Oyo State. For university, Joke Muyiwa attended Obafemi Awolowo University where she got a Bachelor of Arts (B.A Hons) degree in Dramatic Arts. She got a MA degree in Theatre Arts from the University of Ibadan. In December 2020, many years into her lecturing career, Muyiwa was awarded a doctorate (Ph.D.) from Redeemers University.

Muyiwa has over 40 years of acting experience. She started her acting career at the Nigerian Television Authority (NTA), Ibadan, before proceeding to the University of Ibadan Performing Arts Theatre and later the Obafemi Awolowo University Theatre Company. Since then, Muyiwa has appeared in numerous stage dramas, TV series, and films.

Joke Muyiwa started lecturing between 2002 and 2003 at the Lagos State University before moving to Olabisi Onabanjo University where she has lectured for over 14 years. She was a one-time head of department for the department of Performing Arts, Olabisi Onabanjo University. She is one of the ambassadors unveiled by capital sage holdings.

== Personal life ==
Joke Muyiwa is a mother and grandmother. She had two sons but lost one at infancy. Her first son is Abayomi "Thespis" Ayeni, a musician. She became a grandmother in March 2020.

== Awards and recognitions ==
- Best Lead Actress in a Yoruba Film Award at 2013 Best of Nollywood Awards for her role in Ayitale, produced and directed by Adebayo Salami.
- Best Supporting Actress Award at the 2014 Yoruba Movie Academy Awards for her role in Ayitale.
- Nominated for the Best Supporting Actress (Yoruba) category at 2015 Best of Nollywood Awards for her role in Ayo Mi.
- She won the Movie Matriarch Recognition Awards at the 2018 City People Movie Awards.

== Selected filmography ==
- Orisa Aiye (2024) as Bunmi's Mother
- Keji (2023) as Mama Jimi
- The Devil You Know (2023) as Mummy
- Omoye (2023) as Iya Aisha
- King of Thieves (2022) as Aje
- Swallow (2021) as Arike
- Love Castle (2021) as Olori Adefunke
- The Mystic River - A Nigerian Series (2021) as Adenike
- Igbako (2020) as Amope
- The Last Step (2020) as Mama Jade
- Ayomi (2015) as Rantimi's Mother
- Ayitale (2013) as Abeni
- Obinrin Ale (2009) as Mama Folake
- The Narrow Path (2006) as Awero's Mother
- Afonja (2002) as Iyaloja
