= Beast of Two Worlds =

- Directed by: Odunlade Adekola; Adebayo Tijani
- Produced by: Eniola Ajao
- Starring: Odunlade Adekola; Eniola Ajao; Sola Sobowale; Bimbo Akintola; Mercy Aigbe
- Release date: 29 March 2024
- Country: Nigeria
- Language: Yoruba language

Beast of Two Worlds (Ajakaju) is a 2024 Nigerian thriller film produced by Eniola Ajao and directed by Adebayo Tijani and Odunlade Adekola. The film stars Eniola Ajao, Odunlade Adekola, Sola Sobowale, Femi Adebayo, Lateef Adedimeji, Fathia Balogun, Bimbo Akintola, Olayode Juliana and others. The film which is Ajao's debut cinema production, was produced in collaboration with Anthill Studios, owned by Niyi Akinmolayan. Beast of Two Worlds (Ajakaju) was released in Nigerian cinemas on Friday, 29 March 2024.

== Plot ==
Beast of Two Worlds (Ajakaju) tells the story of King Towobola and his three queens, who couldn't give him an heir apparent to the throne. The king's reign soon becomes threatened after the village priests warn that he has some years left to produce an heir, or he will be forced to leave the throne and the town. On a fateful day, the king surprises the kingdom with a strange woman whom he says is his newest queen. Adaralewa has no roots and no one could trace where she comes from, and after some time, she gets pregnant and gives the king a son, but upon delivery, she throws the child into the fire. This gets the king and kingdom upset, but after some time, he gives her another chance and she bears him another son, but this time she throws the child into a river. Afterwards, the audience is shown a flashback through the king's narration. A great hunter known as Odenla went to offer a sacrifice to the forest spirit so that his hunt could be bountiful.

== Selected cast ==
- Odunlade Adekola as King Towabola
- Sola Sobowale as King's mother
- Eniola Ajao as Adaralewa
- Fathia Balogun as Oyenihun / Queen 1
- Bimbo Akintola as Abiade / Queen 2
- Mercy Aigbe as Oyeyiola / Queen 3
- Lateef Adedimeji as Alani
- Ibrahim Chatta as Olu Ode
- Tayo Amokade as Sekere
- Yinka Quadri as Oloye Otun
- Peju Ogunmola as Iyalode
- Murphy Afolabias Olu Awo
- Femi Adebayo as Ode Apa Igala

== Production and release ==
The film was released in cinemas on 29 March 2024 and grossed ₦101.2 million within five days of release. The premiere, which was held before the cinema release, was accompanied by backlash following the announcement of transgender crossdresser Bobrisky as the 'Best Dressed Female' at the event. The announcement, which the producer later revealed was a publicity stunt to further promote her film, resulted in widespread backlash and controversy.
