= Iyabo Oko =

Nigerian film actress (1960–2023)

- Born: Sidikat Odunkanmi; 15 November 1960; Iwo, Western Region (now in Osun State), Nigeria
- Died: 28 June 2023 (aged 62)
- Citizenship: Nigerian
- Occupation: Film actress
- Years active: 1973–2015

Sidikat Odunkanmi (15 November 1960 – 28 June 2023), professionally known as Iyabo Oko, was a Nigerian film actress.

== Early life and career ==
Odunkanmi was born on 15 November 1960, in Iwo, Osun State. In 1973, she started her acting career as a teenager under Eda Onileola Theatre Troupe before she later got popular for her character role in the movie titled Oko; produced by Oga Bello. In 2015, she was diagnosed of Ischemic stroke which made her take a break from acting.

In 2016, she was honoured with the Special Recognition Award at the City People Entertainment Awards for her contribution to the growth of the Yoruba Movie Industry.

== Personal life and death ==
In 2022, her daughter announced she was dead but later confirmed that she was still alive.

Oko died on 28 June 2023, at the age of 62.

== Filmography ==
- Oko
- Ayitale (2013)
- Idunnu Okan (2006)
- Mayowa (1999) as Mama
- Okobo Dimeji (2008)
- Ile Alayo

== Awards and nominations ==
Year	Award	Category	work	Result	Ref
2014	Yoruba Movies Academy Awards	Best Actress in a Supporting Role	Ile Alayo	Nominated	
