= Lakatabu =

2024 Nigerian Yoruba-language crime thriller film

- Directed by: Odunlade Adekola
- Screenplay by: Odunlade Adekola; Akorede Ibrahim
- Produced by: Odunlade Adekola
- Starring: Odunlade Adekola; Femi Adebayo; Lateef Adedimeji; Adunni Ade; Bolanle Ninalowo; Eniola Ajao; Ibrahim Chatta; Akin Lewis; Tina Mba; Adebayo Salami; Yomi Fash Lanso; Broda Shaggi
- Cinematography: Sanjo Adegoke
- Edited by: Sanjo Adegoke
- Distributed by: FilmOne Entertainment
- Release date: 21 June 2024
- Running time: 120 minutes
- Country: Nigeria
- Language: Yoruba

Lakatabu is a 2024 Nigerian Yoruba-language crime thriller film written, produced, and directed by Odunlade Adekola, who also performs the title role. The film premiered in Nigerian cinemas on 21 June 2024 and subsequently became available on Amazon Prime Video. It grossed approximately ₦47 million in its opening weekend, and surpassed ₦200 million in total box office earnings, placing it among the highest-grossing Nollywood productions of 2024. In October 2024, the film topped the Prime Video film chart in Nigeria.

== Plot ==
The film follows Lakatabu, a criminal who employs mystical powers to conduct a campaign of robbery, kidnapping, and murder against a community. According to the screenplay, Lakatabu was initially a figure connected to the local power structure before being betrayed by the king he once served, after which he turned his abilities against the society that wronged him. His downfall is precipitated by a woman he chooses not to kill, who subsequently discovers and exploits the source of his invulnerability.

== Cast ==
- Odunlade Adekola as Lakatabu
- Lateef Adedimeji as Prince Adetola
- Adunni Ade as Tunmise, wife of Prince Adetola
- Bolanle Ninalowo
- Ibrahim Chatta as a medicine man and accomplice to Lakatabu
- Femi Adebayo
- Eniola Ajao
- Akin Lewis as King Folagbade
- Tina Mba
- Oga Bello
- Yomi Fash Lanso
- Broda Shaggi (Samuel Perry) as a street boy
- Tope Adenibuyan (Teddy A)

== Production ==
The film was written by Odunlade Adekola and Akorede Ibrahim, and directed by Adekola, who has written, produced, and directed several prior Yoruba-language productions in which he performed the lead role, including Mufu Olosa Oko (2013), Oyenusi (2014), Alani Pamolekun (2015), and Orisa (2023). Sanjo Adegoke served as cinematographer and editor. Opeyemi Sodunke served as assistant director, and sound was led by Olabode Odeyemi. The film's premiere took place on 16 June 2024 at Film House Circle Mall in Lagos, attended by a number of Nigerian film and entertainment figures.

== Release ==
Lakatabu was released in Nigerian cinemas on 21 June 2024, distributed by FilmOne Entertainment. The film subsequently became available for streaming on Amazon Prime Video. In October 2024, it topped the Prime Video film chart in Nigeria.

== Box office ==
Lakatabu earned approximately ₦47.95 million in its opening weekend, with over 11,000 cinema admissions, which Nairametrics described as the third-highest opening weekend of 2024 in Nigeria. According to data from the Cinema Exhibitors Association of Nigeria (CEAN), it was the highest-grossing Nollywood film for the week of 21 to 27 June 2024, generating approximately ₦65 million in that period. Within one week of release, the film had grossed approximately ₦94 million. By 30 June 2024, cumulative earnings had reached ₦126 million. The film ultimately surpassed ₦200 million in total box office earnings.

ShockNG noted that the opening weekend figure represented a substantial improvement over Adekola's previous production Orisa (2023), which had earned approximately ₦27.58 million in its opening weekend before going on to gross ₦101 million in total.

== Critical reception ==
Critical response to the film was mixed. A review published by What Kept Me Up on 4 July 2024 awarded a negative assessment, arguing that the film drew too heavily from Adekola's earlier productions and offered little narrative originality. The reviewer identified significant structural problems in the third act, including what was described as a forced introduction of Bolanle Ninalowo's character and an implausible resolution centred on Adunni Ade's role.

The Nollywood Reporter published a review on 8 August 2024 that characterised the film as visually accomplished but narratively formulaic, finding that its social commentary on corruption and governmental betrayal was not sufficiently developed to give the film thematic weight beyond its action elements. The review also noted inconsistency in the performances of several cast members.

The Custodian published a review on 6 November 2024 that placed the film within the broader pattern of Adekola's career, describing it as a further iteration of a recurring formula involving a spiritually fortified criminal protagonist who is eventually defeated through the breach of a taboo. The review noted that several cast members, including Ibrahim Chatta and Lateef Adedimeji, were performing roles substantially similar to those they had taken in other recent productions.

ThisDay published a more favourable assessment on 11 January 2025, describing the cinematography and production design as among the film's principal strengths, and characterising Adekola's direction as purposeful in its visual composition and use of contrast between the community setting and the criminal world depicted in the narrative.
