= Jimmie Akinsola =

Nigerian broadcaster, actor, and sports presenter

- Born: Folajimi Oluwasegun James Akinsola; August 8, 1984 (age 42); Surulere, Lagos State
- Education: Lagos State University
- Occupations: Actor, TV presenter
- Years active: 2003-present
- Spouse: Kanayo Ebi-Akinsola (2021)
- Children: 1

Folajimi Oluwasegun James Akinsola (born 8 August 1984), professionally known as Jimmie Akinsola, is a Nigerian broadcaster, actor, sports presenter and compere. He is well known for his roles on Beat FM, Classic FM, Kwesé TV Channel and SuperSport. In 2016, he starred in his first feature film When Love Happens Again.

== Early life ==
Folajimi Akinsola was born in Surulere, Lagos State. He was born as the youngest child among three siblings.

He attended Nazareth Nursery and Primary School in Lagos, for his primary education. He later enrolled at Igbobi College, Yaba, where he completed his secondary education. He earned a diploma in Data Processing and Mathematics from Olabisi Onabanjo University and University of Lagos respectively. Afterwards, he proceeded to pursue a Bachelor’s degree in Business Administration at Lagos State University.

== Career ==
Folajimi first appeared on TV as a seven-year-old child answering a Vox pop question on a football show. However, he officially started his career in 2003 when he joined Godwin Dudu Orumen's The Best of Football and Lucozade Boost Sports Reel as a Sports presenter.

In 2009, Jimmie Joined Megalectrics Limited, owners of The Beat 99.9FM, Classic FM 97.3 and Naija 102.7FM, where he worked as Head of Sports for all three radio stations.

He covered the First FIFA World Cup in Africa, South Africa 2010, which went on to earn him the award for Best Sports Radio Presenter.

In 2012, Folajimi became the host for Industry Nite, a weekly showcase event for music artists that featured Dbanj, Wizkid, Davido, Tiwa Savage, Yemi Alade, Wande Coal and Burnaboy. In 2014, Jimmie Hosted Africa Magic's Football Legends, a TV game show that also featured Ebuka Obi-Uchendu and Odogwu The Comedian. In 2018, he joined Kwese TV Channel as the lead anchor on Kwesé Sports, leading the broadcast of The FIFA World Cup 2018 on Nigerian Terrestrial TV. In 2019, Jimmie joined SuperSport TV as host of The Kings Of Football Show by Budweiser.

His film credits include When Love Happens, Twin Flames, Bad Boys and Bridesmaid. In 2024, he starred in Prime Video Original Ebuka Turns Up Africa, a reality show by Ebuka Obi-Uchendu, also featuring Zubby Michael and Timini Egbuson.

== Filmography ==
=== Film ===
Year	Title	Role	Notes
2016	When Love Happens	Lade	Romance
2017	The Island	Lanre Jegede	TV Series
2021	Bad boys and bridesmaid-	Jaiye	Romance
2023	Twin Flame	Claxton	Comedy / Romance
2024	When Love Strikes		Drama Directed by Adeoluwa Owu

=== Television ===
Year	Title	Role	Notes
2024	Ebuka Turns Up Africa	Himself	TV Reality Show

== Recognition and awards ==
Year	Title	Category	Result	Ref
2009	The Future Awards	On-Air Personality Of the Year	Won	
2010	Nigerian Radio Awards	Best Sports Radio Show	Won	
2011	Nigerian Broadcasters Merit Awards	Best Sport presenter of the Year	Won	
2015	Nigerian Entertainment Awards	Entertainment Personality Of the Year	Won	
2016	Tush Awards	Hypeman Of The Year	Won	

== Personal life ==
In November 2022, Jimmie married Kanayo Ebi, the daughter of Ernest Ebi. Together, they have a son named Kanyechi Folajimi Ernest Akinsola.
