= List of Nigerian films of 2012 =

This is a list of Nigerian films released in 2012.

== Films ==
Title	Director	Cast	Genre	Notes
Phone Swap	Kunle Afolayan	Nse Ikpe Etim; Wale Ojo; Lydia Forson; Joke Silva	Romantic comedy	Africa Movie Academy Award for Best Production Design
Journey to Self	Tope Oshin Ogun	Nse Ikpe Etim; Dakore Akande; Katherine Obiang; Tosin Sido; Ashionye Michelle Raccah		Africa Movie Academy Award for Best Soundtrack nomination
Adesuwa	Lancelot Oduwa Imasuen	Olu Jacobs; Bob-Manuel Udokwu; Ngozi Ezeonu; Kofi Adjorlolo		3 awards at the 8th Africa Movie Academy Awards including Achievement in Costume Design, Achievement in Visual effects, and Best Nigerian film.
Last Flight to Abuja	Obi Emelonye	Omotola Jalade Ekeinde; Hakeem Kae-Kazim; Jim Iyke	Disaster / thriller	Africa Movie Academy Award for Best Film by an African Living Abroad
Fuelling Poverty	Ishaya Bako		Documentary	Africa Movie Academy Award for Best Documentary
Turning Point	Niyi Towolawi	Jackie Appiah; K.D. Aubert; Ernie Hudson; Todd Bridges; Patience Ozokwor	Drama	2 nominations at the 9th Africa Movie Academy Awards
Weekend Getaway	Desmond Elliot	Genevieve Nnaji; Uti Nwachukwu; Ini Edo; Ramsey Nouah; Beverly Naya; Monalisa Chinda; Alex Ekubo	Romantic drama	2 nominations at the 2013 Best of Nollywood Awards
The Meeting	Mildred Okwo	Rita Dominic; Femi Jacobs; Linda Ejiofor; Jide Kosoko; Nse Ikpe Etim; Kate Henshaw; Chinedu Ikedieze	Romantic drama	Africa Movie Academy Award for Best Makeup
Hoodrush	Dimeji Ajibola	OC Ukeje; Bimbo Akintola; Gabriel Afolayan; Chelsea Eze	Musical thriller	2 nominations at the 9th Africa Movie Academy Awards
Amina	Christian Ashaiku	OC Ukeje; Omotola Jalade Ekeinde; Wil Johnson; Van Vicker; Vincent Regan; Alison Carroll	Psychological drama	
Feathered Dreams	Andrew Rozhen	Omoni Oboli; Evgeniy Kazantsev; Andrew Rozhen	Drama	This was also the first Ukrainian English-language feature film..

== See also ==
- List of Nigerian films
