= The Return of Omotara Johnson =

- Directed by: Adeoluwa Owu
- Written by: Abdul Tijani-Ahmed; Bukky Wright; Oluwole Ogundare; Ojayy Wright; Agnes Stephens
- Screenplay by: Abdul Tijani-Ahmed
- Produced by: Bukky Wright (exec.); Moses Babatope (co-exec.); Naomi Bamidele (co-exec.); Seyi Adekunle Vodi (co-exec.); Usman Muheedeen Olounwa (co-exec.); Shinayomi Daniel (co-exec.); Olayinka Salami (co-exec.); Rebecca Adetunji (co-exec.); Olumide Ogundare (co-exec.); Georgina Ogundare (co-exec.); Moradeke Adebesin (co-exec.); Fatima Sesay (co-exec.); Adetutu Ajoke Ogundare (co-exec.); Taiwo Adebayo; Ojayy Wright; Oluwole Ogundare
- Starring: Bukky Wright; Timini Egbuson; Richard Mofe-Damijo; Shaffy Bello; Chidi Mokeme; Nse Ikpe-Etim; Ali Nuhu; Lilian Esoro; Tomi Ojo; Uzee Usman
- Cinematography: Jonathan Kovel
- Edited by: Olakunle Martini Akande
- Music by: Clement Kponu (OST.), Ojayy Wright, Tope Alabi, Kabex, Mz Kiss, Imanse, Justferanmii, Ade James, Mayhem BLK
- Distributed by: Nile Entertainment
- Release date: July 10, 2026 (Nigeria)
- Country: Nigeria
- Languages: English; Yoruba
- Box office: ₦151.2 million

The Return of Omotara Johnson (abbreviated as TROJ) is a 2026 Nigerian crime drama film directed by Adeoluwa Owu and produced by Bukky Wright. It is a sequel to the 2008 Yoruba-language film Omotara Johnson, in which Wright played the title character. The film follows Omotara as she attempts to maintain a peaceful life with her son, Raymond, until he becomes a suspect in a murder investigation. The film was released in Nigerian cinemas on 10 July 2026.

== Plot ==
Years after leaving her criminal past behind, Omotara Johnson attempts to build a peaceful life while raising her son, Raymond, an aspiring musician. Her efforts are disrupted when Raymond becomes the prime suspect in a murder investigation. As the case unfolds, Omotara becomes entangled in a series of betrayals and unresolved conflicts involving people from her past. Her relationship with Temisan, played by Richard Mofe-Damijo, is also complicated by concealed family relationships and secrets.

== Cast ==
The film features the following actors:

=== Main ===
- Bukky Wright as Omotara Johnson
- Timini Egbuson as Raymond
- Richard Mofe-Damijo as Temisan Williams
- Shaffy Bello as Rolake
- Chidi Mokeme as Tunde Gbamgbopa
- Nse Ikpe-Etim as Meg Williams
- Ali Nuhu as Alhaji
- Lilian Esoro as Officer Bankole
- Tomi Ojo as Emily
- Uzee Usman as Santana
- David Ojah as Younger Raymond
- Tolu Asani as Cassandra

=== Supporting ===
- Tony Goodman as Alhaji
- Ojayy Wright as Femi Blinks
- Gorgor Martins as Folakemi
- Janet Adebayo as Vanessa
- Lilian Esoro as Officer Bankole
- Bright Daniels as Police Detective
- Gbenga Akomolafe as Police Detective
- Emmanuel Paul as Police Detective
- Kelvin Praise as Police Detective
- Precious Usman as Doctor
- Okpanachi Samuel as Investigator
- Sydney Diala as Investigator
- Victoria Godwin as Waiter
- Chidimma Ugwu as Lady
- Moses Aminu as Walder
- Ralph Ikechukwu Edu as Board member
- Chizoba Adueze Onwugbenu as Board member
- Abraham Ayeh as Police Officer
- Sunday Yachat as Police Officer
- Uchechukwu Excel as Police Officer
- Florence Nwafor as Police Officer
- Emmanuel Paul as Police Officer
- Bright Daniel as Police Officer
- Peter Baba as Police Officer

== Production ==
Adeoluwa Owu directed the film, and Abdul Tijani-Ahmed wrote the screenplay. Wright produced the film, which continues the story of the title character introduced in the original 2008 film. The project marked Wright's return to the character after approximately 18 years. According to Premium Times, post-production was completed in the United Kingdom. The film's cast combines established Nollywood actors with younger performers.

== Release ==
On 24 June 2026, Bukky Wright released the official trailer of the film. The film received a special screening in Abuja on 28 June 2026 before its Lagos premiere at the Monarch Event Centre in Lekki on 4 July. It was released and distributed by Nile Entertainment nationwide in Nigerian cinemas on 10 July 2026.

== Critical reception ==
Professional ratings
Review scores
Source	Rating
TheCable Lifestyle	5/10

On 18 July 2026, Life Magazine cited TROJ as one of the five Nollywood films worth watching this July. In a review published on 19 July 2026, Premium Times praised Wright's performance and the supporting cast but noted that the film's pacing and multiple storylines sometimes weakened its emotional impact. The review also discussed the sequel's use of nostalgia and its relationship to the original film. On 16 August 2026, reviewing for TheCable, Muhibat Sulaimon rates the movie 5/10, with the remark "The change in O.J.'s character could have been interesting, but the film needed to show how we got there. A brief explanation of what happened after the first film and how she became involved in the new operation would have given the sequel much more clarity."

== Box office ==
On 31 August 2026, QED.ng reported that the film had grossed ₦151.2 million at the box office, citing an announcement by distributor Nile Entertainment.
