= Turning Point (2012 film) =

2012 film by Niyi Towolawi

- Directed by: Niyi Towolawi
- Written by: Niyi Towolawi
- Produced by: Niyi Towolawi; Catrine Mcgregor-Unger; Pax Osaro; Sanni Ibrahim
- Starring: Igoni Archibong; Jackie Appiah; K.D. Aubert; Todd Bridges; Ernie Hudson; Patience Ozokwor; Enyinna Nwigwe
- Cinematography: Timur Civan
- Edited by: Niyi Towolawi; Thomas Wong
- Music by: Lawrence Adeokun
- Production company: HekCentrik Productions
- Release date: 12 December 2012
- Country: United States
- Language: English

Turning Point is a 2012 drama film written and directed by Niyi Towolawi and starring Jackie Appiah, K.D. Aubert, Todd Bridges, Ernie Hudson, Patience Ozokwor, with Igoni Archibong in the leading role of "Ade".

It received 2 nominations at the 9th Africa Movie Academy Awards.

== Plot ==
Ade (Igoni Archibong) is a playboy Nigerian-American investment banker working at a successful firm in New York City. He is in a relationship with keen-to-marry African-American Stacey (KD Aubert). Her family (Ernie Hudson, Cynda Williams) had been cautious of this "African" but begins to warm to him due to his professional success and charm.

However, Ade's manipulative mother (Patience Ozokwor) back in Nigeria would rather her son gets serious and dumps "that girl with no traceable roots" in favour of a wife from within her social circle. He is tricked into visiting Nigeria only to discover an arranged marriage had already been conducted on his behalf with a complete stranger. Reluctantly, Ade accepts the new wife, Grace (Jackie Appiah), since she is beautiful and seems submissive.

Back in the US, Ade avoids Stacey until she crudely discovers his secret marriage. Grace quickly settles into the American lifestyle, living as a kept woman, while Ade continues to enjoy the freedom of a bachelor.

Grace eventually tires of Ade's behaviour and confronts him, setting off a series of battles that makes Ade realise how easily his enviable lifestyle could be taken away. With the going tough and friends think, Ade decides to mount a final showdown that will be a turning point for everyone.

== Cast ==
- Igoni Archibong as Ade
- Jackie Appiah as Grace
- K.D. Aubert as Stacey
- Todd Bridges as Marvin
- Joe Estevez as The Boss
- Ernie Hudson as Mr Johnson
- Enyinna Nwigwe as Steve
- Oge Okoye as Ebony
- Patience Ozokwor as Ade's Mum
- Cynda Williams as Mrs Johnson
- Tim Duquette as Client #1
- Gerald Yelverton as Jason
- Leonard Dozier as Dollar Rain
- Ebbe Bassey as Renee

== See also ==
- List of Nigerian films of 2012
