= Yinka Quadri =

Nigerian actor (born 1959)

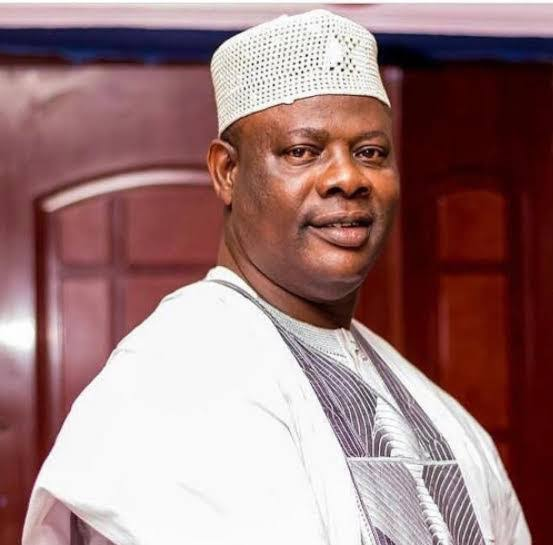
- Born: Akanni Olayinka Quadri; 6 September 1959 (age 66); Lagos Island, Lagos State, Nigeria
- Occupations: Thespian; Film Producer; Film Actor
- Years active: 1976–present
- Known for: Kura Matete

Alhaji Akanni Olayinka Quadri // ( (born 6 September 1959) is a Nigerian actor, film maker, producer and director born and in Lagos Island, Lagos State but is a native of Oro, Kwara State.

== Early life and education ==
Yinka, a descent of Igbomina-, Kwara State, was born into a middle-class family in September 1959 in Lagos Island, Lagos State.

== Education ==
He completed his primary school education and secondary school education at St. Catholic School, Idumagbo, Lagos and Christ High School, Ebute Elefun, Lagos, respectively.

== Career ==
Yinka's (also known as Fagbamila) acting career started in 1976 when he and Taiwo Olayinka along with a group of friends formed a drama group called Afopina Theatre Group after dropping out of school. He has starred in over 90 Yoruba films since his debut television series titled Agbodorogun. On April 27, 2014, Yinka launched his biography Yinka Quadri: Scent of a Legend and simultaneously celebrated his 36 years in the Nigerian film industry.

== Selected filmography ==
- Olaniyonu
- Kutupu
- Kura
- Ekun
- Agbodorogun
- Ojiji
- Egbinrin Ote
- Araba
- Ilari
- Odun Baku
- Bolode O'ku
- Èebúdolá Tèmi
- Abeni
- Apaadi
- Ojo Idajo
- Abulesowo
- Niwoyi Ola
- Ilekun Olorun
- Okinni
- The Return of Jenifa (2011)
- Arinzo (2013)
- Owo Blow
- 77 Bullets (2019)
- Shola Arikusa
- Gangs of Lagos
- Move Like a Boss (2024 film)

== Awards and nominations ==
Year	Award ceremony	Prize	Result
2007	3rd Africa Movie Academy Awards	Best Actor in a Supporting Role	Nominated
2010	2010 Best of Nollywood Awards	Best Indigenous Actor in a Lead Role (Yoruba)	Nominated
2012	2012 Nollywood Movies Awards	Best Actor in an Indigenous Movie (Non-English speaking language)	Nominated
2013	2013 Best of Nollywood Awards	Best Supporting Actor in a Yoruba film	Nominated
2014	2014 Best of Nollywood Awards	Best Actor in Leading Role (Yoruba)	Nominated
2023	Africa Magic Viewers' Choice Awards	Best Supporting Actor	Nominated

== See also ==
- List of Yoruba people
