= Toyin Adegbola =

Nigerian film actress (born 1961)

- Born: Oluwatoyin Oluwaremilekun Adegbola; 28 December 1961 (age 64); Osun State, Nigeria
- Citizenship: Nigerian
- Occupations: actress; producer; director
- Years active: 1984–present
- Known for: Asewo to re Mecca
- Notable work: Ayitale
- Spouse: Mr Anthony Kolawole Adegbola
- Children: 2
- Awards: Hope foundation Professional Excellence award

Toyin Adegbola popularly known as Toyin Asewo to re mecca, Toyin Tomato (born 28 December 1961) is a Nigerian film actress, producer and director.

== Career ==
Toyin began her acting career in 1984 in the Yoruba language films of Nollywood. She is a member of the board of the Osun State Arts and Culture Council. She is a popular face in the Nollywood sector.

== Personal life ==
Adegbola was married to a journalist Mr. Anthony Kolawole Adegbola who later died. She met her late husband when she was working in the Television House, Ibadan. At that time, Mr. Adegbola was working at NTA Lagos. Adegbola has two children, a daughter, and a son; both live in Dublin, Ireland. She also has two grandchildren. On Saturday, 5 March 2016, she was conferred with a chieftaincy title as Yeye Meso of Oke-Irun, State of Osun, by His Royal Majesty Alayeluwa Oba Isaac Adetoyi Adetuluese Olokose 11.

== Selected filmography ==
- Asewo to re Mecca (1992)
- Koseegbe (1995) as Suwebatu
- Mayowa (1999) as Tolani
- Akobi gomina (2002) as Iyabo
- Ojabo kofo (2003)
- The Campus Queen (2004) as Tok's Mother
- Ladepo Omo Adanwo (2005) as Queen
- Adesoro (2006) as Iyawo Olori Ebi
- Ekuro (2007) as Adeyemi's Mother
- Atanpako meta (2008)
- Oju ife (2009)
- Oga olopa (2010)
- Emi Abata (2012) as Iya Ibilola
- Ayitale (2013) as Sade
- Omo University (2015) as Adunni
- Burgled (2020)
- Adarugudu (2020) as Iya Kayode
- Esin (2021) as Ejigbede Leader
- Shadow Parties (2021) as Queen of Aje Land

== Awards ==
Professional Excellence Award from Symbol of Hope Foundation from her performance in Asewo To Re Mecca.
