= Ajuwaya =

- Directed by: Tolu Awobiyi Lord Tanner
- Produced by: Tolu Awobiyi Lord Tanner
- Starring: Timini Egbuson, Lanre Hassan, Etinosa Idemudia, Kemi Lala Akindoju and Rahama Sadau.
- Release date: 2017
- Country: Nigeria
- Budget: English

Ajuwaya is a 2017 Nigerian adventure film produced and directed by Tolu Awobiyi Lord Tanner. The film stars Timini Egbuson, Lanre Hassan, Etinosa Idemudia, Kemi Lala Akindoju and Rahama Sadau.

== Synopsis ==
Six National Youth Service Corps members who were posted to a village in Osun State find their service year complicated when they inadvertently revive an age-long evil in the community.

== Cast ==
- Kemi Lala Akindoju as Yewande
- Rahama Sadau as Halima
- Christopher Darko as Ayo
- Timini Egbuson as Collins
- Lanre Hassan as Mama Ejo
- Etinosa Idemudia as Emem
- Dec Imafidon as Femi
- George Kalu as Chidi
- Tolu Lordtanner as narrator
- Feyifunmi Oginni as lab scientist
- Suara Olayinka as Muyiwa
- Sanni Omozieghele as Osas
- Osunbiyi Taiwo as bus driver

== Premiere ==
The film premiered nationwide on 7 July 2019.
