= Amina (2012 film) =

Nigerian film by Christian Ashaiku

- Theatrical poster
- Directed by: Christian Ashaiku
- Written by: Christian Ashaiku
- Produced by: Christian Ashaiku; Wil Johnson
- Starring: Omotola Jalade Ekeinde; Wil Johnson; Van Vicker; Vincent Regan; Alison Carroll; Susan Mclean
- Cinematography: Andrei Austin; Neil Johnson
- Edited by: Liz Webber
- Music by: Warren Bennett; Sam Bergliter
- Production company: AOC Communication
- Distributed by: Talking Drum Entertainment
- Release date: June 2012
- Running time: 93 minutes
- Countries: Nigeria; United Kingdom
- Language: English

Amina is a 2012 Nigerian psychological drama film written, produced, and directed by Christian Ashaiku, starring Omotola Jalade Ekeinde, Van Vicker, and Alison Carroll. Amina was shot on location in London.

== Cast ==
- Omotola Jalade Ekeinde as Amina
- Wil Johnson as Dr Johnson
- Van Vicker as Michael
- Vincent Regan
- Alison Carroll as Lucy
- Susan Mclean as Nurse
- Charlie Buck as Shakespeare Lady
- Jonathan Cohen as Stunt Performer
- Sophia Leonie as Kate
- Suzann McLean as Gina Johnson
- Aatif Nawaz as Social Worker
- Jenny Walters as Queenie

== Reception ==
Amina received generally mixed to negative reviews; many critics criticized the casting of the film. NollywoodForever gave it a 45% rating, and also commented negatively about the casting.

== See also ==
- List of Nigerian films of 2012
