= The Vendor =

2018 Nigerian film

- Directed by: Odunlade Adekola
- Written by: Odunlade Adekola
- Produced by: Odunlade Adekola
- Starring: Odunlade Adekola; Adunni Ade; Jide Kosoko; Eniola Ajao; Ireti Osayemi; Kayode Olaseinde; Tunde Bernard; Bolaji Amusan
- Release date: 7 September 2018
- Running time: 102 minutes
- Country: Nigeria
- Language: Nigerian

The Vendor is a 2018 Nigerian nollywood comedy film written by Odunlade Adekola, Korede Ibrahim, and Tunde Komolafe.Produced and directed by Odunlade Adekola, winner of the 2018 Africa Magic Viewers' Choice Awards Best Actor in a Comedy. The official trailer for the movie was released in August 2018 whilst the movie got its cinema release on 7 September 2018, with a run time of 102 minutes. The film premiered on Netflix on 27 December 2019.

== Plot ==
The film starred Odunlade Adekola as Gbadebo, a local newspaper vendor suffering from Entitlement syndrome. He is unsatisfied with his life and considers his present status and a lot of the people he interacts with daily to be less than him. He blames his lack of ambition and success on the environment that pervades his environment, but the reality is that he is a lazy man that prefers to spend his days complaining and putting down the honest efforts of those around him.

Gbadebo somehow lands a position as Morayo's driver, a young wealthy lady, played by Adunni Ade. However, his high level of indiscipline makes it impossible for him to work for long in this new job before getting into some serious trouble. owever, he finally made it, when he met his wealthy biological father.

== Cast ==
- Odunlade Adekola as Gbadebo / Godwin
- Adunni Ade as Morayo
- Jide Kosoko as Akinwunmi
- Eniola Ajao as Tinuade
- Ireti Osayemi
- Kayode Olasehinde as Babasade
- Tunde Bernard as Emeka
- Bolaji Amusan as Lasisi
- Gbenga Oladunni as Mr. Taiwo
- Korede Ibrahim as Jegede
- Adewale Adebayo as Gateman
- Olanrewaju Adeyemi as Mr. Lanre
- Funmi Bank Anthony as Pastor
- Olajuwon Awe as Daisi
- Aderinoye Babatunde as B.J.
- Adetutu Balogun as Lady
- Nike Hamzat as Folawunmi
