= Enakhe =

Nigerian crime drama

- Genre: Crime drama
- Written by: Xavier Ighorodje
- Directed by: Victor Sanchez Aghahowa
- Starring: Alex Usifo; Ivie Okujaye; Philip Asaya; Lota Chukwu
- Country of origin: Nigeria
- Original language: English
- No. of seasons: 1
- No. of episodes: 260

Production
- Executive producer: Victor Sanchez Aghahowa
- Producer: Nne Nlemadim
- Production locations: Benin, Edo State
- Running time: 30 minutes

Original release
- Network: Africa Magic
- Release: 28 September 2020 – 24 September 2021

Enakhe is an Africa Magic original crime drama set in modern-day Benin City. It was directed by Victor Sanchez Aghahowa and features Alex Usifo, Ivie Okujaye, Philip Asaya, Lancelot Oduwa Imaseun and Lota Chukwu. It premiered on September 28, 2020 and airs on Africa Magic Showcase, DStv channel 151. It also streams on Showmax, at the same time as the broadcast on Africa Magic.

== Plot summary ==
Set in modern-day Benin city, Enakhe tells the story of Epa Iwinosa, father of the Eponymous character and the leader of “the association of friends” also known as “the table”, a small brotherhood that rules the underworld in Benin. Epa moved to crime after his friend's child died due to a lack of funds. It also tells the story of Enakhe who is kind, unassuming and ignorant of her father's dealings. Enakhe is unfit for a life of crime but in spite of this, she is destined to rule after Epa who is unexpectedly killed. Enakhe grows to know about her father's dealings and is forced out of her shell to embrace her father's ruthlessness and fearlessness.

== Cast and characters ==
=== Main characters ===
- Alex Usifo as Osasere ‘Epa’ Iwinosa, the patriarch of the Iwinosa family and leader of ‘The table’ of friends.
- Lancelot Odua Imasuen as Chief Sir Ehigiator Osagie, a lily-livered man who isn't in control of his business or his household. Epa's criminal ally and member of the table.
- Ivie Okujaye as Enakhe Iwinosa, the eponymous star of the show. She struggles to find her feet in the crime world following her father's death.
- Tolu Odewunmi as Latifah Iwinosa, Enakhe's mother and Epa's second wife. Latifah is insecure because she did not bear Epa an heir and therefore has no place on the table.
- Benjamin Olaye Jnr as Archie Umweni, Enakhe's narcissistic, entitled, self-absorbed and condescending fiancé who is a disappointment to his father.
- Angela Eguaveon as Ivie Osakpolor, Enakhe's best friend and adopted daughter of the Iwinosas who doubles as Archie's secret lover.
- Charles Etubiebi as Jonas Osagie, Chief Osagie's heir and Enakhe's love interest. He often comes off as being naive and too relaxed.
- Sammi Edehi Egbadon as Onanefe Efetobore, California's cousin who was raised with the sole purpose of bringing down the Iwinosa family. He however starts to question his mother's single-minded purpose and seek his own path.
- Lota Chukwu as Jacinta Osagie, Unlike her brother, Jacinta knows the crime business and takes charge of her family's stake. She isn't afraid of getting her hands dirty.
- Philip Asaya as California 'Cali' Osasere Iwinosa, He is Epa's first born. Cali's endearing love for his family and his quest to make sure they remain safe and also at the top of the crime business, brings him on a stormy side of life to sail on.
- Ekhaguere Patience as Regina, She is the wife to Stone and baby mama to Epa. Regina is the accountant to the family's company. She transitions from being a soft naive chic to the complete opposite.
- Kate Adepegba as Margaret Osagie
- Eunice Omoregie as Ejiro/Ejiro
- Efosa Adams as Stone Iwinosa
- William Goldwyn Omo as Chief Umweni
- Odera Olivia Orji as Tamuno ‘Tamtam’ Timipreye Nengi Adoki as General Market 'GM'

== Production and release ==
Enakhe was set on location in Benin City, Edo State. It is a product of the Edo Creative Hub which was created to streamline engagements with the state's creative industry. The cast and crew is approximately 90 percent indigenous.

It was listed as one of the top 5 Nigerian TV series of 2020.

== Awards and nominations ==
| Year | Award | Category | Recipient | Result | Ref |
|---|---|---|---|---|---|
| 2022 | Africa Magic Viewers' Choice Awards | Best Africa Magic Original Drama Series | Victor Sanchez Aghahowa | Nominated | |

== See also ==
- Africa Magic
- Ivie Okujaye
- Lota Chukwu
- Philip Asaya
