= The Mystic River =

2021 Nigerian TV series

- Genre: Nigerian Horror Series
- Directed by: Uzodinma Okpechi
- Starring: Dele Odule; Jide Kosoko; Lota Chukwu
- Country of origin: Nigeria
- Original languages: English; Yoruba
- No. of episodes: 6 episodes

Production
- Producer: Rogers Ofime

Original release
- Network: Netflix
- Release: 14 May 2021

The Mystic River is a Nigerian dramatic series produced by Rogers Ofime, streaming on Netflix. The series started 14 May 2021. It consists of one season of six episodes for now, streaming on Netflix, but the series is said to consist of 26 episodes in all, starring popular Nigerian Actors Jide Kosoko, Dele Odule, Lota Chukwu, Joke Muyiwa and a few others.

== Synopsis ==
The Mystic River series was shot in Ijebu Ode area of Nigeria and the series follows a story of different women disappearing from a particular remote village in Nigeria. The women disappearing all had one thing in common, which was that they were all pregnant. This continued for many years until a particular doctor comes by a child and the doctor begins her journey to uncovering the very dangerous secrets that houses this mystery.

The press screening of the screening was held at Terra Kulture Cultural Center in Victoria Island area of Lagos state, and it was an eventful event which saw a lot of people coming together to share ideas on the series, the producer also revealed how the story is a combination of good and bad altogether.

== Cast ==
- Jide Kosoko as Ede King
- Dele Odule as Balogun
- Lota Chukwu as Ebere
- Joke Muyiwa as Adenike
- Jude Chukwuka as Adeniyi
- Olawale Gold as Ademola
- Grace Coker as Widow
- Ben Lugo Touitou as Sam
- Temilolu Fosudo as Adewale
- Rhoda Albert as Head Maiden
- Adenike Ayodele as Bisi
- Debby Felix as Enitan
- Eric Ossai as Igoniko
- Tommy Oyewole as Aruba
- Olu Okekanye as CMD
- Abu Blessing as Nurse

== Episodes ==
6 Episodes

== Reception ==
The series which is widely described as Nigerian horror series has received different receptions from people around the world and the series has been described as a series which has helped to expose a deadly tradition which needs to be abolished in Nigeria.

The reception received from the movie was amazing as the Producer of the series revealed that the series was borne out of the desire and urge to stand up for things we don't like in the country at large as depicted in the movie. Another actor who featured in the movie, Soibifaa Dokuba had also revealed on how he had to do things he's not done in other movies before in this movie. Actor Jude Chukwuka also commended the screenwriter and filmmaker for upholding the African and the Nigerian culture in the project.

=== Awards and nominations ===
| Year | Award | Category | Recipient | Result | Ref |
|---|---|---|---|---|---|
| 2022 | Africa Magic Viewers' Choice Awards | Best Art Director | Mayowa Labiran | Nominated | |
| 2022 | Africa Magic Viewers' Choice Awards | Best Costume Designer | Obijie Oru | Nominated | |
| 2022 | Africa Magic Viewers' Choice Awards | Best Lighting Designer | Yemi Awoponle | Nominated | |
| 2022 | Africa Magic Viewers' Choice Awards | Best Cinematographer | Samuel Jonathan And Moruf Fadaro | Nominated | |
| 2022 | Africa Magic Viewers' Choice Awards | Best Television Series | Rogers Ofime | Won | |
