= Owambe Thieves =

- Directed by: Adeoluwa Owu
- Written by: Adeoluwa Owu
- Produced by: Eniola Ajao
- Starring: Fathia Balogun: Odunlade Adekola; Femi Branch; Hadiza Abubakar
- Release date: 13 April 2025
- Country: Nigeria

Owambe Thieves is a 2025 Nigerian crime drama film produced by Eniola Ajao and directed by Adeoluwa Owu. It tells the story of a young couple, Cheta and Lola, who struggle to make ends meet while raising their newborn child during one of the worst economic recessions in Nigeria’s history. The film stars Zubby Michael, Faithia Balogun, Hadiza Abubakar, Seilat Adebowale, Femi Branch, Odunlade Adekola, Bashirah Giwa and many others.

== Cast ==
- Zubby Michael as Cheta
- Haziza Abubakar
- Odunlade Adekola as Oga Bernard
- Fathia Balogun
- Femi Branch as Oga Blings Blings
- Eniola Ajao as Lola
- Bashirah Giwa
- Sola Sobowale as Madam Toke
- Wumi Toriola as Tade
- Akin Lewis as Senator Taiwo

== Premiere ==
The premiere of the film was held on Sunday, 13 April 2025, at Circle Mall, Lekki, Lagos. It was released in all cinemas nationwide on 18 April and in selected cinemas in the UK from 9 May 2025.

The premiere was graced by many Nollywood actors, who attended in traditional attire representing various cultures. K1 De Ultimate was one of the guest performers at the event.
