= When Love Strikes =

2024 Nigerian film

- Directed by: Adeoluwa Owu
- Written by: Chinaza Onuzo; Joy Bewaji
- Produced by: Inkblot Productions
- Starring: Osas Ighodaro; Natse Jemide; Chuks Joseph; Bimbo Akintola; Zubby Michael; Ademola Adedoyin; Jimmie Akinsola
- Distributed by: Inkblot Productions
- Release date: 13 September 2024
- Country: Nigeria

When Love Strikes is a 2024 Nigerian film produced by Inkblot Productions and released to the Nigerian cinema on 13th, September 2024. The cast includes Osas Ighodaro, Natse Jemide, Bimbo Akintola, Zubby Michael, Sunshine Rosman, Jimmie Akinsola, Vine Olugu, Chuks Joseph and others. The film directed by Adeoluwa Owu is Nigeria's first football-themed movie and this has generated comments from the Nigerian football league, the chairman of the Nigeria Premier League board, Hon. Gbenga Elegbeleye has expressed great excitement at the collaboration between the sport industry and the movie industry, noting that he expects more collaboration of such.

== Synopsis ==
When Love Strikes tells the story of iBK, a young footballer who wants to get to the peak of his football career and play professionally abroad. Unfortunately, he lost his father along the line and this places two options ahead of him - to either follow his football dreams squarely or return to college in order to support his family.

== Selected cast ==
- Osas Ighodaro
- Nate Jemide
- Bimbo Akintola
- Zubby Michael
- Ademola Adedoyin
- Jimmie Akinsola
- Taye Arimoro
- Suo Chapele
- Chuks Joseph
- Vine Olugu
- Sunshine Rosman

== Production and release ==
When Love Strikes was produced by Inkblot Productions in collaboration with Eku Edewor's Get Reel Production. The film was predominantly shot in Lagos and Ikenne in Ogun state. Being a football-themed movie, the film got sponsorship and support from sport and football brands including Remo Stars FC, Bet9ja, and Pepsi.
