= Blackout (2021 film) =

2021 Nigerian film

- Directed by: Abbey Abimbola
- Written by: Abbey Abimbola
- Produced by: Segun Arinze; Abbey Abimbola; Toyin Alausa
- Starring: Segun Arinze; Eniola Ajao
- Release date: October 2021
- Country: Nigeria

Blackout is a 2021 Nigerian film written and directed by a Malaysian based Nigerian actor Abbey Abimbola (Crackydon). The movie was released in October 2021 and was produced by the actors that featured in the movie including Segun Arinze, Abbey Abimbola, Akin Olaiya, Toyin Alausa. The movie is all about the crisis and problem faced by average Nigerians concerning power supply.

The film was premiered at the cinemas around Nigeria on 29 October 2021.

== Plot ==
The film started with an outspoken businesswoman and activist named Adam Shan who spearheaded a new protest movement that quickly gained support from the people across the country; painfully she is then brutally killed. When her son receives the shocking news, her son Captain Abdalla (Crackydon) resigned from the Nigerian Army to seek justice for the death of his mother.

The film Blackout stirs up a lot of controversy around the poor condition of power supply in Africa and Nigeria. For many years, the majority of Nigerians who depend on NEPA "PHCN" for their daily electricity have experienced disruptions in their daily lives.

== Cast ==
- Segun Arinze
- Abbey Abimbola
- Toyin Alausa
- Abbey Abimbola
- Akin Olaiya
- Eniola Ajao
- Murphy Afolabi
- Tayo Sobola
- Geoff Andre Feyaerts

== See also ==
- List of Nigerian films of 2021
