= Labake Olododo =

2025 Nigerian film

- Directed by: Biodun Stephen
- Written by: Yakubu Olawale Moshood
- Story by: Iyabo Ojo
- Produced by: Iyabo Ojo; Layole Oyatogun; Alaba Ultimate
- Starring: Iyabo Ojo; Odunlade Adekola; Fathia Balogun; Mercy Aigbe; Omowunmi Ajiboye
- Release date: 28 March 2025
- Country: Nigeria
- Language: Yoruba

Labake Olododo is a 2025 Nigerian epic film produced by Iyabo Ojo and directed by Biodun Stephen. The film was released in Nigerian cinemas on March 28, 2025. It stars Iyabo Ojo, Femi Adebayo, Faithia Williams, Kunle Afolayan, and Mr Macaroni. It is set against the Yoruba cultural heritage and tells the story of a heroine who through her fearless nature fights against injustice within the community amidst societal pressure.

Following its release, Labake Olododo became the second largest debut for 2025 grossing over ₦50 million at the box office in its opening weekend.

== Plot summary ==
Set in the Yoruba tradition Labake Olododo tells the story of Labake, a courageous young woman who has the strong desire to fight against injustice in the society. The story explores the complexities of traditional expectations, showing how Labake was able to rise against oppression in her community. Her desire and courageous nature towards fighting for justice lands her in betrayal and in the web of political scheme.

== Selected cast ==
- Odunlade Adekola
- Faithia Balogun
- Iyabo Ojo
- Mercy Aigbe
- Scarlet Gomez
- Tayo Faniran
- Femi Adebayo
- Alaba Ultimate
- Rotimi Fakunle
- Omowunmi Ajiboye
- Olumide Oworu

== Release and distribution ==
Labake Olododo was shot in Ibadan. It was released nationwide on 28 March 2025.
