= The Grudge (2016 film) =

- Directed by: Yemi Morafa
- Produced by: Funmi Holder
- Starring: Richard Mofe-Damijo (RMD), Iretiola Doyle, Odunlade Adekola and Jaiye Kuti
- Release date: 2016
- Country: Nigeria
- Language: English

The Grudge is a 2016 Nigerian film produced by Funmi Holder and directed by Yemi Morafa. The film that is based on relationship and marriage stars Richard Mofe-Damijo (RMD), Iretiola Doyle, Odunlade Adekola and Jaiye Kuti.

== Synopsis ==
The film revolves around two separated spouses from two different marriages and a widow as they battle to settle an aged long grudge that is creating a rift among them.

== Premiere ==
The film was first premiered on 23 October 2016 at the Radisson Blu, Lagos. Following the success of the first screening, a VIP premiering was held for the cast, celebrities and notable people such as Funlola Aofiyebi, Caroline King, Taiwo Obileye, Elvis Chuks and Hon. Otunba George Oladele at Sojourner Hotel, GRA, Ikeja.

== Top cast ==
- Odunlade Adekola as Taju
- Richard Mofe-Damijo (RMD) as Tayo
- Jaiye Kuti as Mrs. Kikelomo
- Ijeoma Aniebo as Chikodi
- Funmi Holder as Ebere
