= The Miracle Centre =

2020 Nigerian comedy film

- Directed by: Niyi Towolawi
- Written by: Stanley Isokoh; Niyi Towolawi
- Produced by: Odetoye Bode; Niyi Towolawi
- Starring: Yemi Shodimu; Hafeez ‘Saka’ Oyetoro; Ayo Mogaji; Femi Adebayo; Ayobami ‘Woli Agba’ Ajewole
- Cinematography: Idowu Adedapo
- Edited by: Sanjo Adegoke; Niyi Towolawi
- Music by: Sanjo Adegoke
- Production companies: HekCentrik Films; Kherut Films
- Release date: 15 February 2020 (United Kingdom)
- Running time: 95 minutes
- Country: Nigeria
- Language: English

The Miracle Centre is a 2020 Nigerian comedy film directed by Niyi Towolawi and co-produced by director himself with Odetoye Bode for Kherut Films. The film stars Yemi Shodimu with Hafeez "Saka" Oyetoro, Ayo Mogaji, Femi Adebayo, and Ayobami "Woli Agba" Ajewole in supporting roles. The film tells the story of Panya Grammar School, where a new teacher, Mr. Greg, meets a corrupt education system that he plans to change.

The film premiered on 15 February 2020. The film received positive reviews from critics and screened worldwide.

== Cast ==
- Yemi Shodimu as Mr Greg
- Hafeez ‘Saka’ Oyetoro as Vice Principal
- Ayo Mogaji
- Femi Adebayo
- Ayobami ‘Woli Agba’ Ajewole
- Etinosa Idemudia as Lucy
- Broda Shaggi
- Rotimi Salami
- Odunlade Adekola as Taxi Driver
- Rachael Okonkwo
- Mary Owen
- Muyiwa Donald
- Chinonso Ukah
- Ralph Niyi
