= Odera Olivia Orji =

Nigerian actress, film director and producer

- Born: April 10
- Occupations: Actress; film director; film producer
- Years active: 2012–present
- Notable work: Jemeji, Obsession, History of Chicken, Knockout Blessing, Love and Pain, Soole, Dark Sides, Situationship, More than Enough, Deserted
- Awards: Best Nollywood movies awards, 2018

Odera Olivia Orji // is a Nigerian actress, film director and producer.

== Career ==
Odera Olivia Orji's acting career started after starring in the 2012 film " Last flight to Abuja". Her career came into the limelight after she starred as the character " Peace" in the MNET Africa television series Jemeji. She has also starred in several movies, including Obsession, The Father, Blue, Fifty, Kayanmata, Bedroom Points, and Just a Fling. In 2018, she was nominated and won the Best of Nollywood Awards for Best Kiss in a movie alongside Mawuli Gavor.

=== Other work fields ===
Olivia serves as media and creative associate at Eureka Media Services and Assistant Director, Content Development, Mind works Story Consultancy and Productions.

== Selected filmography ==
- Lunch Time Heroes (2015)
- Fifty (2015)
- Coming to Nnewi (2015)
- Colourless (2016) as Zainab
- Ifemelu: something happened (2016)
- Obsession (2017)
- Knockout Blessing (2018) as Vivian
- Bedroom Points (2018)
- Sergeant Tutu (2018)
- Bedroom Points (2019)
- Blue Collar (2019)
- Hell Mary (2019)
- Just a Fling (2019)
- Reserved Edge (2019)
- Split (2019)
- Love and Pain (2020) as Augusta
- Through The Wire (2020) as Iyanu
- The Father (2020) as Bukola
- Blue (2020) as Chika
- Eyimofe (This Is My Desire) (2020) as Receptionist
- Dark Sides (2020)
- Sapio (2020)
- Kayanmata (2020) as Passionate Lady
- Situationship (2021) as Amara
- To Be Frank With You (2022)
- Deserted (2022) as Amaka
- Attribution (2023)

=== Television ===
- ‘Soole’ (2021) as Anwui
- Jemeji (2017) as Peace
- Enakhe (2020) as Tamuno
- Newman Street (2016) as Dr. Sophie
- Afterdark, (2019)
- Calabash, (2016)
- Legal Clinic, (2015)

=== Director ===
- History Of Chicken (2019)
- Family Court (2019) Co-Director

== Awards and nominations ==
Year	Event	Prize	Recipient	Result
2018	Best of Nollywood Awards	Revelation of the Year (FEMALE)	Herself	Nominated
2018	Best of Nollywood Awards	Best Kiss in a movie	Herself	Won
2019	Africa Movie Academy Awards	Best Actress in a Supporting Role	Self	Nominated
2019	Abuja International Film Festival	First-Time Director (The History of Chicken)	Self	Nominated
2019	City People Movie Awards	Most Promising Actress of the Year (English)	Self	Won

== See also ==
- List of Nigerian film producers
