= Adeoluwa Owu =

Nigerian film director (born 1985)

- Born: Adeoluwa Emmanuel Owu; 1985 (age 40–41); Ilorin, Kwara State
- Other name: Captain Degzy
- Education: University of Ilorin; Pefti Film Institute
- Occupations: film director; cinematographer
- Years active: 2011 – Present

Adeoluwa Emmanuel Owu commonly known as Captain Degzy is a Nigerian film director, and cinematographer, best known for his works on the television series Far From Home (2022) and Shanty Town (2023), and the films A Tribe Called Judah (2023) and Jagun Jagun (2023), the latter of which earned him a nomination at the AMVCA for Best Cinematography. In 2023, FilmOne listed him as the highest-grossing director on Nigeria BoxOffice Yearbook.

== Early life and education ==
Adeoluwa Emmanuel Owu was born in Ilorin, Kwara State. He hails from Kogi State and is of Yagba descent. Owu attended the University of Ilorin before proceeding to the Pefti Film Institute in Lagos, where he earned a degree in filmmaking, and he sharpened his skills while he was in the institution as a cinematographer, editor, and director.

== Partial filmography ==
=== Film ===
| Year | Film | Role |
|---|---|---|
| 2026 | The Return of Omotara Johnson | Director |
| 2025 | Owambe Thieves | Director |
| 2024 | Asiri Ade | Director |
| 2024 | When Love Strikes | Director |
| 2024 | Queen Lateefah | Director |
| 2024 | Crossroads | Cinematographer |
| 2023 | Adire | Director |
| 2023 | A Tribe Called Judah | Director |
| 2023 | What No One Knows | Director |
| 2023 | Jagun Jagun | Cinematographer |
| 2022 | One Too Many | Cinematographer |
| 2022 | Before Valentine's | Cinematographer |
| 2021 | Blind Date | Director |
| 2021 | The Griot | Director and Executive producer |
| 2021 | Ex with Benefits | Director |
| 2021 | What Happened at St James | Cinematographer |
| 2021 | My Village People | Cinematographer |
| 2021 | Charge and Bail | Cinematographer |
| 2020 | Introducing the Kujus | Cinematographer |
| 2020 | Betty's Love Triangle | Cinematographer |
| 2020 | Gaslight | Director |
| 2020 | This Lady Called Life | Cinematographer |
| 2020 | Time Looped | Cinematographer |
| 2020 | A Thousand Ways to Break a Cheating Man | Cinematographer |
| 2019 | The History of Chicken | Cinematographer |
| 2019 | Adaife | Cinematographer |
| 2019 | Ms Independent | Cinematographer |
| 2019 | Never Saw It Coming | Cinematographer |
| 2018 | Oga Bolaji | Director of photography |
| 2018 | Love in a Time of Kekes | Cinematographer |
| 2018 | Memoirs of 4 | Cinematographer |
| 2017 | A Case of Free Will | Cinematographer |
| 2017 | For My Girls | Cinematographer |
| 2017 | Uncloaked | Cinematographer |
| 2017 | Stormy Hearts | Cinematographer |
| 2017 | In Our Trap | Cinematographer |
| 2017 | Stranger Than Ever | Cinematographer |
| 2017 | Timeless | Cinematographer |
| 2017 | Chasing Rainbows | Cinematographer |
| 2017 | Mid Life Blues | Cinematographer |
| 2016 | Romance Is Overrated | Cinematographer |
| 2011 | Larmes de sang | Cinematographer |

=== Television ===
| Year | Television serie | Role |
|---|---|---|
| 2025 | The Anomalous | Cinematographer |
| 2024 | Game Changer: The Power Play | Director |
| 2023 | Shanty Town | Cinematographer (steadicam) |
| 2022 | Far From Home | Co-cinematographer |
| 2021 | Tough Love | Cinematographer |

== Awards and nominations ==
| Year | Award | Category | Work | Result |
|---|---|---|---|---|
| 2020 | Queen Palm International Film Festival | Best Cinematography | Himself for The Anomalous | Won |
| 2021 | Africa International Film Festival | Oronto Douglas Award for Best Nigerian Film | Himself for The Griot | Won |
| 2021 | Golden Leaf International Film Festival | Special Jury Award | Himeself for Blind Date | Won |
| 2024 | Africa Magic Viewers' Choice Awards | Best Cinematography | Himself for Jagun Jagun (The Warrior) | Nominated |
| 2024 | The Nollywood 100 | Legacy Award | Himself | Honoured |
