= Eniola Ajao =

Nigerian actress

- Born: Eniola Ajao
- Education: University of Lagos; Yaba College of Technology
- Occupation: Actress

Eniola Ajao is a Nigerian actress from Epe who has acted in over 75 films. She is known for her dynamism and versatility on set in her role delivery.

== Personal life ==
Ajao and her twin sister are the youngest siblings of her parents' six children. The twins celebrate their birthday on 21 January. Growing up, Ajao attended Saint Michael's Anglican Primary School and Army Secondary School in Epe. According to Ajao, although she wanted to make her parents proud, she dreamed of being an actress since she was young. Ajao would go on to attend Yaba College of Technology and then the University of Lagos where she would earn her degree in accounting. Eniola Ajao gave birth to a son named Ayomide Okikiola Daniel on 17 May 2002.

Despite numerous rumors, she is not in a relationship with frequent collaborator Odunlade Adekola.

== Acting career ==
Ajao's first film role would be in 2004 where she was cast in the film Ìgbà Aìmọ̀. Other films she has acted in include Eniola, Erin Orin, and Daramola. She starred in the 2018 film The Vendor. Ajao played the lead role in Yeye Alara released in December 2018.

She was nominated for Best Actress in a Supporting Role in a Yoruba-language film at the 2015 Best of Nollywood Awards, but she did not win the award.

== Filmography ==
Year	Films	Roles
2018	The Vendor	Tinuade
2018	Yeye Alara	
2018	Wetin Women Want	Lota
2019	Olokiki Oru(The midnight Sensation)	Omo leyin Akala
2019	77 Bullets	Susan's gang member
2020	Ajebidan	Aduke
2021	Blackout	Tife
2021	Ajibade	
2022	wasila reloaded	Detective 1
2022	Omoge carwash	Stella
2023	Diety	Olori omobola
2024	Beast of Two Worlds	Ajakaju
2024	Lakatabu	
2024	Lisabi: The Uprising	Orosola
2025	Owambe Thieves	Lola

== See also ==
- List of Yoruba people
