= President Kuti =

- Directed by: Tope Adebayo, Ibrahim Yekini
- Written by: Azeezat Sorunmu
- Produced by: Ibrahim Yekini
- Starring: Ibrahim Yekini; Odunlade Adekola; Fathia Balogun; Bimpe Oyebade; Afeez Abiodun; Adeyemi Adebisi; Light Aboluwodi; Omolara Adebayo; Poopola Adebimpe; Seilat Adebowale; Olaniyan Adenike; Aderoju Adeyemi; Janet Ajibawo; Kola Ajeyemi; Adewale Ajose; Yusuf Akintude; Kemi Apesin; Deola Ayoade; Mustapha Abiola
- Release date: 14 July 2021
- Country: Nigeria
- Language: Yoruba

President Kuti is a 2021 Nigerian action film produced by Ibrahim Yekini. It was written by Azeezat Sorunmu and directed by Tope Adebayo and Ibrahim Yekini. The film was released on 14 July 2021.

== Cast ==
- Ibrahim Yekini
- Bimpe Oyebade
- Odunlade Adekola as Ayomide
- Afeez Abiodun as Baba Afusa
- Adeyemi Adebisi as Manager
- Light Aboluwodi as Customer
- Omolara Adebayo as Lara
- Poopola Adebimpe as Omo olona
- Seilat Adebowale as Alagbo
- Olaniyan Adenike as Receptionist
- Aderoju Adeyemi as Alagbo
- Janet Ajibawo as Olosho
- Kola Ajeyemi as Alagbo
- Adewale Ajose as Bureau de change
- Yusuf Akintude as Alagbole
- Kemi Apesin as Alagbo
- Deola Ayoade as Alagbo
- Mustapha Abiola as Mopol Boyscout
- Fathia Balogun as Kobewude

== Synopsis ==
President Kuti is the commander of the street who is respected yet feared by all; he faces attacks from rival gangs whom he has always won against.

== Reception ==
The film generated over 2 million views in the first two weeks after it was uploaded on YouTube.

== Awards ==
- Best Indigenous Movie of the Year at the 2021 City People Movie Awards.

== See also ==
- Odunlade Adekola
- Kesari (2018 film)
- Lucifer (Nollywood film)
