= Adewale Elesho =

Nigerian actor (born 1959)

- Born: Adeoye Adewale; January 10, 1959 (age 67); Ikirun, Osun State, Nigeria
- Other names: Elesho, Baba Elesho, Adewale Elesho, Enujawaya
- Occupations: Actor; Comedian; Theatrical producer
- Years active: 1980s–present
- Spouse: Married
- Relatives: Yemi Elesho (son)

Adeoye Adewale (born 10 January 1959), popularly known as Elesho or Enujawaya, is a Nigerian actor, comedian, and theatrical producer. He was elected as the president of the Association of Nigeria Theatre Arts Practitioners (ANTP). He is regarded as one of the veteran performers in the Yoruba-language film industry and is known for portraying outspoken, witty, and confrontational characters.

== Early life and education ==
Adewale was born on 10 January 1959 in Ikirun, Osun State, Nigeria. He was raised in a traditional Yoruba family, where his father served as a Baale (community chief). Growing up in southwestern Nigeria, he developed an interest in storytelling, drama, and oral performance traditions at an early age.

Born with albinism, Adewale has spoken publicly about the social challenges and discrimination he experienced during his childhood. Despite these experiences, he remained active in community activities and school performances, eventually developing the confidence that would shape his career in entertainment.

He attended local authority primary schools before proceeding to a modern school in Ile-Ife. Before fully committing to the entertainment industry, he reportedly engaged in small-scale trading, including the sale of pharmaceutical products.

== Career ==
=== Early theatre career ===
Adewale began his acting career through local theatre groups and traveling theatre troupes, which were central to Yoruba popular culture during the 1970s and 1980s. His performances drew attention for their improvisational humour and energetic delivery.

His professional breakthrough came after meeting filmmaker and actor Adeyemi Afolayan, popularly known as Ade Love. Through this association, Adewale was introduced to the growing Yoruba film industry and secured roles in film and television productions.

=== Rise to prominence ===
During the expansion of Yoruba home-video productions in the late 1980s and 1990s, Adewale established himself as a recognizable comic actor. His distinctive on-screen characters often featured fast-paced dialogue, sharp humour, and portrayals of outspoken community elders, chiefs, and authority figures.

He became known among audiences for his ability to blend comedy with social commentary, making him a recurring presence in Yoruba-language films and television dramas.

Throughout his career, he worked alongside several prominent figures in the Nigerian entertainment industry and appeared in productions that contributed to the popularization of Yoruba cinema both within Nigeria and among diaspora audiences.

=== Theatre administration and leadership ===
Beyond acting, Adewale has played administrative and leadership roles within Nigeria's theatre community. He served in leadership positions within the Association of Nigerian Theatre Arts Practitioners (ANTP), including a tenure as National President.

His involvement in professional associations focused on promoting the welfare of theatre practitioners, preserving Yoruba cultural performance traditions, and encouraging professional standards within the industry.

=== Contemporary career ===
In the 2020s, Adewale experienced renewed visibility through appearances in mainstream Nollywood productions and streaming-era projects. His performances introduced him to younger audiences while reinforcing his status as a long-standing figure of Yoruba cinema.

His appearance in Aníkúlápó (2022), directed by Kunle Afolayan, and Alakada: Bad and Boujee by Toyin Abraham, brought renewed attention to his work and highlighted the continued relevance of veteran actors in contemporary Nigerian filmmaking.

== Public image and advocacy ==
Adewale has been recognized as one of the most prominent Nigerian actors living with albinism. Through interviews and public appearances, he has discussed issues relating to social inclusion, discrimination, and public perceptions of persons with albinism in Nigeria.

His experiences have frequently been cited as an example of resilience within the Nigerian entertainment industry, where he achieved prominence despite societal challenges associated with albinism.

== Personal life ==
Adewale is married and has children. His son, Yemi Elesho, is a Nigerian actor, comedian, and content creator.

The father-and-son relationship has attracted media attention due to their shared careers in entertainment, with commentators describing Yemi Elesho as continuing the family's legacy in Nigerian comedy and acting.

== Selected filmography ==
=== Film ===
- Ti Oluwa Ni L'ile
- Taxi Driver
- Koto Aye
- Koto Orun
- Owo Blow
- Aro Meta
- Farugbotayin
- Baba Okele
- Lalude
- Aníkúlápó (2022) – Ojumo Chief
- Malaika (2023)
- Alakada: Bad and Boujee (2024)
