= Lanre Hassan =

Nigerian actress (born 1950)

Lanre Adesina Hassan
- Born: 3 October 1950 (age 75); Nigeria
- Other name: Iya Awero
- Citizenship: Nigeria
- Occupation: Actress

Lanre Adesina Hassan (born 3 October 1950), popularly called Iya Awero is a Nigerian film actress, who features majorly in the Yoruba-language cinema of Nollywood, although she features in English-language productions as well. Since the start of her career with the Ojo Ladipo Theatre Group, Iya Awero has starred in multiple films.

== Early life ==
Hassan was born in Lagos. She spent most of her early life in Lagos Island, Lagos state.

== Education ==
Hassan attended Oduwabore Memorial School, Mushin, Lagos. Before acting, Hassan attended the School of Drama for professional training.

== Career ==
At the age of 14, Hassan joined the drama group Young Stars Concert Party alongside members like Ojo Ladipo (also known as Baba Mero) and Adebayo Salami. Later, they changed their name to Ojo Ladipo Theatre Group. She entered the Lagos School of Dramatic Arts in 1970 under the direction of Chief Olude, a drama professor at the time, to give her performance an intellectual bite and flare. She received straight admission to the Center for Cultural Studies at the University of Lagos, where she studied for a diploma in theatre. However, she became pregnant and was unable to finish the program. Baba Mero died in 1978, and Adebayo Salami took over as leader of the newly renamed Awada Kerikeri (Oga Bello). Hassan has starred in many Yoruba-language films since her debut.

== Selected filmography ==
- Symphony (2022) as Grandma
- The Cock-Tale (2020) as Awaru
- Mama Insurance (2012)
- King of Boys (2018) as Iya Loja
- Ajuwaya (2017) as Mama Ejo
- Omo Elemosho (2013) - Asake
- Ayitale (2013) - Ajoke
- Family on Fire (2011)
- Ìlù Gángan (2009)
- Iró funfun (2009) - Mama Abioye
- Adelebo (2008)
- Aje Metta (2008) - Olori Aje
- Baba Lukudi (2008) - Iyawo Tunde
- Igba Ewa (2008)
- Ìkúnlè Kèsán (2008)
- Ìrírí Mi (2008) - Mama Lanre
- Oníbárà (2008)
- Àtànpàkò òtún (2007) - Arowolo's Wife
- Ejide (2007)
- Okun Emi (2007)
- Oluweri Magboojo
- Dokita Alabere (2006)
- Fadùn Sáyémi (2006)
- Ire Aye Mi (2006)
- Eto Ikoko (2005) - Atogbase
- Idajo Mi Tide (2005)
- Ishola Oba-orin (2005)
- Ogo-Nla (2005)
- Sade Blade (2005)
- Ògìdán (2004)
- Ògo Idílé (2004)
- Okun Ife (2004)
- Orí (2004)
- Jawonbe (2003)
- Ogbologbo (2003)
- Ojabo Kofo (2003)
- Pakúté Olórun (2003)
- Boya Lemo (2002)
- Aso Ásiri (2002) - Iya Mosun
- Back to Africa (1997)
- Owo Blow: The Genesis (1997) - Mama Jide
- O Le Ku (1997) as Awero
- Owo Blow (1996)

== See also ==
- List of Yoruba people
- List of Nigerian actors
