= Zubby Michael =

Nigerian actor and film producer

Zubby Micheal
- Born: Azubuike Michael Egwu; Anambra State
- Citizenship: Nigerian
- Education: Nnamdi Azikiwe University (Mass Communication)
- Alma mater: Nnamdi Azikiwe University
- Occupations: Actor movie producer.
- Known for: His role in Three Windows.

Azubuike Michael Egwu professionally known as Zubby Michael is a Nigerian actor and film producer. He is known for his roles in Three Widows, Royal Storm and Professional Lady.

== Life and career ==
Zubby was born on February 1, 1985, in Anambra State. He attended Nnamdi Azikiwe University where he obtained a degree in mass communication.

He began acting at a young age in Yola, the capital city of Adamawa State. His first movie appearance was in a movie titled Missing Rib but became popular for his lead role in The Three Widows. Zubby has appeared in several other films.

=== Political career ===
On 25 November 2019, he was appointed into a political position as the special adviser on media to the Anambra State governor Willie Obiano. He was awarded a certificate of recognition for his contribution to the City Radio 89.7 FM youth empowerment initiative in Anambra State.

== Awards and nominations ==
=== Acting awards ===
Year	Award	Category	Result
2019	City People Movie Awards	Best Actor of the Year (Igbo)	Nominated
2019	City People Movie Awards	Best Actor of the Year (English)	Nominated
2019	Nigeria Achievers Awards	Best Lead Actor of the Year (English)	Nominated
2019	South South Achievers Awards (SSA)	Male Actor of the Year	Nominated
2018	South East Entertainment Award	Movie icon of the year	Won
2018	City People Movie Awards	Best Actor Of The Year (English)	Nominated
2015	Nigerian Entertainment Award	Actor of the Year (Indigenous Films)	Nominated
2015	City People Movie Awards	Best Supporting Actor of the Year (English)	Nominated
2014	City People Movie Awards	Best New Actor of the Year (English)	Nominated
2011	Best Of Nollywood Awards (BON)	Most Promising Act (male)	Nominated

=== Other awards ===
Year	Award	Category	Result
2020	South-East Beauty Pageant Organisation	Best Celebrity Politician of the Year	Won
2019	City People Movie Awards	Best Igbo Film of the Year (Eze ndi Ala)	Nominated
2018	The Nigerian MSMEs & Achievers Awards	Nollywood Personality of the Year	Won

== Pictorials ==
Year	Name of Magazine
2019	A New Touch of Africa (spring/summer 2019 edition)

== Interviews ==
Year	Interview
2021	KingsPrimeTV
2019	BBC news Igbo
2019	A New Touch of Africa

== Selected filmography ==
Year	Name	Role	Starring
2025	Owambe Thieves	Cheta	Sola Sobowale, Akin Lewis
2024	When Love Strikes		Ademola Adedoyin, Jimmie Akinsola, Bimbo Akintola
2023	The Bride Price	Aloysius	Akinola Akano, Adebayo Davies
2023	Onyeegwu	Alex	Toyin Abraham, Lateef Adedimeji, Adebowale Adedayo
2022	Brotherhood	Poison	Mercy Aigbe, Roland Akande
2022	The Wildflower	Johntana	With Toyin Abraham, Mojisola Adebanjo, Joy Adeyemi
2022	Passport	Terminator	Mercy Johnson, Daniel Abua, Lateef Adedimeji
2021	Bloody Doings	Ugonna	Starring Jerry Amilo
2021	Ponzi	Charles	With Anne Annex, Adebowale Adebayo
2021	My Village People	Bishop Divine	With Sophie Alakija, Fares Boulos, Nkem Owoh
2020	Omo ghetto:The Saga	Azaman	Mercy Aigbe, Yewande Adebayo
2020	Identical Twins		
2020	Bad Omen		
2020	Burial Battle		
2020	Audio Money		
2020	Egg of love		
2019	The Return of Dangote		
2019	Our Father's Property	Ebuka	
2019	Dying of Thirst	Uzor	
2019	Blood Feud	Reuben	
2019	Children obey your parents	Azubuike	
2019	Hunchback Princess	Ugo	
2019	Seed of Greatness	Agumba	
2019	A Thousand War	Obidi	
2019	G4 The Money Men	Obinwanne	
2019	Flashback	Chris	Starring Rachael Okonkwo
2019	Seed of Deception	Chima	
2019	Enemy of Progress	Uzondu	
2019	Shameless Sisters		Starring Lizzy Gold
2019	Yahoo King	King Ezego	
2019	Boy Makes Money	Uzodimma	
2019	Son of No Man	Nnanna	
2019	The Return of Eze Ndi Ala	Eze	Starring Ken Erics, Rachael Okonkwo
2019	Afraid to Fall	James	
	Pains of the Orphan	Prince Chimaobi	
2018	Throne of Terror		
2018	Sound of Calamity	Prince Irudike	
2018	Lack of Money	Joshua	
2018	Hunted Bride	Prince Ahamefula	Starring Eve Esin
2018	Omenka	Prince Obieze Nnoruka	Starring Queen Nwokoye
2018	Yahoo Shrine	Jide	
2018	Bastard Money	Lazarus	
2018	Made in South	Edozie	
2018	Anayo China	Anayo	
2018	Wasted Authority	Collins	Starring Ngozi Ezeonu
2018	Youngest Wife	Festus	
2018	The one man squad	Victor	
2018	Mama		Starring Liz Benson
2017	Eze Ndi Ala in America	Eze	Starring Ken Erics, Rachael Okonkwo
2017	The King of Vulture (Eze K'udene)		
2017	Mr Arrogant	Arinze	
2017	The Return	Igwe Ufuma	Starring Chacha Eke
2017	War for love	Dennis	Starring Rachael Okonkwo
2017	Ozoemena Ozubulu	Ozoemena	
2017	Adaure, My love	Izunna	Starring Rachael Okonkwo
2017	Sword of Justice	Prince Ogugua	Starring Ken Erics, Ngozi Ezeonu
2016	Family Matters (Akara Ayasago)	Tony	Starring Ebere Okaro
2015	1st Hit	Gallardo	Starring Nonso Diobi and Mayor Ofoegbu
2015	The Promise	Izu	Starring Chacha Eke
2015	Abba	Chibueze	Starring Queen Nwokoye
2015	Okada 50	Okada 50	Starring Ebere Okaro
2015	Compound fools	Ossai	Starring Kenneth Okonkwo, Yul Edochie; Queen Nwokoye and Funke Akindele
2015	My love, my mother's wish	Ikechukwu	Starring Rachael Okonkwo
2015	Settle Me	Agozie	Starring Ken Erics, Ngozi Ezeonu
	The Struggle	Alfred	Starring Kelvin Books Ikeduba
2013	Cry of a Witch	Buike	Chiwetalu Agu, Chizzy Alichi
2009	Heavy Heart	Johnson	Pascal Chinedu, Halimar Abubakar
2007	Blood Apart	Johnpaul	Pat Asore, Oge Chukwuka
