= The Griot (film) =

2021 Nigerian film

- Release poster
- Directed by: Adeoluwa Owu
- Screenplay by: Temilolu Fosudo
- Story by: Temilolu Fosudo
- Produced by: Goodness Emmanuel
- Starring: Lateef Adedimeji; Temilolu Fosudo; Funso Adeolu; Goodness Emmanuel; Imoh Eboh; Sharon Jatto
- Cinematography: Adeoluwa Owu
- Edited by: Hakeem Olowookere
- Production company: Degzy Films
- Distributed by: Netflix
- Release date: November 9, 2021
- Running time: 109 minutes
- Country: Nigeria
- Language: English

The Griot is a 2021 Nigerian drama film directed by Adeoluwa Owu and produced by Goodness Emmanuel. The film stars Lateef Adedimeji, Temilolu Fosudo, Funso Adeolu, Goodness Emmanuel, Imoh Eboh, and Sharon Jatto. It was released on 9 November 2021 and premiered on Netflix in 2022.

== Plot ==
The film's theme revolves around a shy but skilled storyteller who has a talent for storytelling, but his best friend tries to take credit for his tales and win the heart of the woman they both love.

== Cast ==
- Abimbola Adebajo as Queen
- Lateef Adedimeji as Lakunle
- Yewande Adekoya as Sunbo
- Jare Adeniregun as Odejinmi
- Funso Adeolu as Oba Adejare
- Adekunle Adeosun as Patron
- Fatimo Adio as Olori
- Kunle Afod as Baba
- Angela Babarinsa as Iyemojo
- Imoh Eboh as Romoke
- Goodness Emmanuel as Tiwa
- Temilolu Fosudo as Sanmi
