= Niyi Towolawi =

Niyi Towolawi is a British filmmaker and writer/director of TWisTED and Turning Point.

== Early life ==
Towolawi is of Yoruba, Nigerian descent, and grew up in Canning Town, East London. He is a Mathematics graduate from the University of Manchester, where he played basketball and studied Shaolin Kung Fu. He is a jazz musician and plays numerous musical instruments.

== Career ==
Towolawi began producing music in high school and had a number of white label record releases at the height of the UK Garage scene. He worked as a software developer after graduating from university. He continued producing music and shooting numerous music videos in a cinematic style which later manifested in his feature films.

His films centre around people of African origin in the diaspora and explore elements of multi-dimensional relationships along ethnic, gender, or taboo issues, and often feature characters of subjective motives. His first film, TWisTED, was one of the first to project digitally when it premiered at Odeon, Surrey Quays in 2007, with support from the UK Film Council. He lists Ridley Scott as his all-time favourite director.

== Filmography ==
- TWisTED (2007)
- Turning Point (2012)
- Drawn In (2014)
- Fusion (2016)
- Desecration (2017)
- The Miracle Centre (2020)
- In Bed with the Pedros (2023)
- Aiyefele (2024)
