= Olakunle Martini Akande =

Nigerian filmmaker and producer

Olakunle Martini Akande (born September 18, 1993, in Ibadan, Nigeria) is a filmmaker, a film editor, and a producer who specializes majorly in post-production.

== Education ==
After secondary education, Akande gained admission to the University of Ibadan where he studied statistics, made meaningful connections with creatives and up-and-coming filmmakers like himself, delved into acting for a while and eventually found solace in film editing.

== Career ==
According to Olakunle,

I didn’t set out to become a film editor. In fact, my first love was acting. I had dreams of performing, of being on stage or in front of a camera. But like many people trying to break into the industry, I quickly found out how difficult it was to land the kind of roles I wanted. The opportunities just weren’t coming. Still, my friends and I were passionate about filmmaking, so, we started making our own short films. But we kept running into the same problem: editors would take too long or didn’t really get what we were trying to do. So I decided to give it a shot myself. I had some experience editing wedding and event videos, so I figured, why not? That decision changed everything. I started editing our projects, and the more I did it, the more i realized how much i love the process.[4]

This summarizes the career history of Olakunle Akande, from where he started his editing career fully.

His first movie edit was '''Musomania''', from which he grew to edit many other high-profile films like

Gangs of Lagos

Brotherhood

Glamour Girls

Christmas in Lagos and

Adire
