= African Entertainment Awards USA =

Annual entertainment awards ceremony held in New Jersey

- Abbreviation: AEAUSA
- Founded: 2015
- Founder: Dominic Tamin
- Type: Non-profit organization
- Location: Newark, New Jersey, U.S.
- Website: aeausa.net

The African Entertainment Awards USA (AEAUSA) is an annual awards ceremony held in New Jersey, United States, founded in 2015 by Dominic Tamin. The ceremony recognises individuals of African and Caribbean origin for achievement across music, film, television, sports, fashion, media, and digital content. Since its establishment, the ceremony has nominated and recognised prominent African and Caribbean artists and public figures, including nominees and winners from Nigeria, Tanzania, Trinidad and Tobago, and other countries across the African diaspora.

== History ==
The AEAUSA was founded in 2015 by Dominic Tamin in New Jersey. The ceremony has been held annually since its establishment, with award categories spanning music, film, television, sports, fashion, media, and digital content.

The 2020 edition was held as an online event, streamed on YouTube, owing to restrictions imposed by the COVID-19 pandemic.

In 2021, Colombian singer J Balvin received the Afro-Latino Artist of the Year award. The decision attracted public criticism, following which the organising body renamed the category to Best Latin Artist of the Year.

The 2023 ceremony was held on 11 November in New Jersey. Nominees for that edition included Burna Boy, Wizkid, Davido, Tiwa Savage, Yemi Alade, Diamond Platnumz, and Harmonize.

The 2024 ceremony included among its recipients Davido, Ayra Starr, Olamide, Chris Brown, and D'Banj.

For the 2025 edition, the voting period ran from 17 October 2025 to 15 December 2025. In February 2026, Aaron St. Louis, known as Voice, received the Calypso/Soca Award for the 2025 edition.
