= Shola Arikusa =

- Directed by: Okiki Afolayan
- Produced by: Hissa Yusuf
- Starring: Fathia Balogun, Odunlade Adekola, Femi Adebayo, Yinka Quadri, Akintunde Yusuf, Queen Adesewa, Temitope Bamidele Saint, Dammy Faniyi, Sunday Agbaje, Victoria Ajibola
- Cinematography: Tunde Dickson, Mojeed Alao, Jamiu Isiaka, Ayo Arowosafe, Tunde Bangbode
- Edited by: Ridwan Adebayo, Olumide Samuel
- Music by: Emeka Joseph
- Release date: 2017
- Country: Nigeria
- Language: Yoruba

Shola Arikusa is a 2017 Nigerian film produced by Hissa Yusuf and directed by Okiki Afolayan.

It stars Fathia Balogun, Odunlade Adekola, Femi Adebayo, Yinka Quadri, Kazeem Bello and many others.

== Synopsis ==
The movie tells the story of a woman whose entire family were massacred because of a political appointment. Shola Arikusa seeks the aid of the god of Ijamido for vengeance.

== Cast ==
The following actors featured in the film;

- Fathia Balogun as Shola Arikusa
- Odunlade Adekola as Alfa Agba
- Femi Adebayo as Inspector Biyi
- Yinka Quadri as Adifala
- Kazeem Bello as Derogba
- Remi Rebecca as Inspector Biliki
- Ijagbemi Monsuru as Goriola
- Folake Ojo as Iya Shola
- Yetunde Ogunsanya as Iya Folorunsho
- Victoria Ajibola as Prices
- Jamiu Azeez as Farugu
- Raphael Niyi as Folorunsho
- Sola Popoola as Iyawo Alfa
- Queen Adesewa as Omo Alfa
- Temitope Bamidele Saint as Army
- Mr Ladi Folarin as Oba Adeoye
- Akintunde Yusuf as Eko
- Adeleke Tosin as Arugba
- Kazeem Muritala as Ekanna
- Dammy Faniyi as Irawo
- Jamiu Isiaka as M.I
- Ayo Arowosafe as Ifagbemi
- Sunday Agbaje as Jaailegbo
- Tunde Bangbode as Fokoko
