= Frederick Leonard =

Frederick Leonard may refer to:

- Frederick Leonard (actor), Nigerian actor
- Frederick Leonard (activist), American civil rights activist
- Frederick C. Leonard (1896–1960), American astronomer
- Fred C. Leonard (1856–1921), American politician
