= Iyabo Ojo =

Nigerian actress (born 1977)

- Ojo at the 2026 Toronto International Film Festival.
- Born: Alice Iyabo Ogunro; 21 December 1977 (age 48); Lagos State, Nigeria
- Education: Lagos State Polytechnic
- Occupations: Actress; director; producer
- Years active: 1998–present
- Known for: Entertainment activism

Alice Iyabo Ojo (born 21 December 1977) is a prominent Nigerian film actress, director, and producer popularly known for her contributions in the Nollywood film industry. She has featured in over 150 films and has produced more than 14 of her own.

== Early life ==
Iyabo Ojo was born as Alice Iyabo Ogunro on 21 December 1977 in Lagos, Nigeria, although her father was from Abeokuta, Ogun State. She is the youngest of three children, having two older brothers.

== Education ==
She attended National College in Gbagada, Lagos, before enrolling at Lagos State Polytechnic to pursue a Higher National Diploma (HND) in Estate Management

== Career ==
Having been involved in a drama group at secondary school, Iyabo Ojo commenced her acting career in 1998. She registered with the Actors Guild of Nigeria (AGN) with the help of Bimbo Akintola and was also able to network to other people

Ojo has scripted and featured in several Nigerian films. Her first role was in 1998's Satanic, an English-language film. In 2002, she made her Yoruba-language debut with Baba Darijinwon. In January 2015, her film Silence, which features Joseph Benjamin Alex Usifo, Fathia Balogun, and Doris Simeon, premiered at the Silverbird Cinemas, Ikeja, in Lagos.

In 2004, Ojo started producing her own films. Her first production was Bolutife, after which she made Bofeboko, Ololufe, Esan and Okunkun Biribiri. She also divorced her husband before her fame started. She recently produced and released a cinematic movie Labake Olododo that is currently available in cinema

In 2026, Ojo made her directorial debut with The Return of Arinzo, which premiered in Lagos on 29 March 2026 ahead of its theatrical release in April.

== Personal life ==
Marrying a Lagos-based Clearing Agent in 1999, when she was 21, Iyabo took a break from pursuing her career. She gave birth to a son and then a daughter (born in 1999 and 2001 respectively), namely Felix Ojo and Priscilla Ajoke Ojo, but is now divorced from their father. She has attributed the breakup of her first marriage to marrying too young. She has spoken of her intention to stop using her former husband's surname, Ojo.

== Pinkies Foundation ==
Iyabo Ojo launched her NGO, Pinkies Foundation, which caters to children with special needs and the less privileged, in May 2011. She celebrated the fifth anniversary of the foundation on 1 May 2016 at the R&A City Hotel, Ikeja, Lagos.

== Activism ==
In April 2021, she strongly condemned fellow actor, Yomi Fabiyi for sympathising with Olanrewaju Omikunle (Baba Ijesha) who was arrested for molesting a minor. On 12 May 2021, she took legal action against Yomi Fabiyi (who had earlier staged a protest requesting the release of Baba Ijesha) for making "defamatory statements" about her. Her actions did not go down well with the Theater Arts and Motion Pictures Practitioners Association of Nigeria, (TAMPAN), and they blacklisted her on 28 June 2021. According to Legit.ng, actor Jide Kosoko, speaking for TAMPAN, said that Nollywood filmmakers under the association will stop working with her.

As documented by Nelogram, Ojo publicly accused fellow celebrity, Naira Marley of spiritual and physical dealings with Mohbad, implying potential culpability in his death. Marley vehemently denied these accusations and retaliated with a N1 billion defamation lawsuit against Ojo, claiming her comments damaged his reputation. Ojo countered with her own legal claims, alleging improper service of the lawsuit.

== Selected filmography ==
=== Films ===
Films starring Iyabo Ojo
Year	Film	Role	Notes
2025	Labake Olododo	Labake	African Drama
2024	Momiwa	Kiki	Comedy / Drama
2023	Merry Men 3: Nemesis	Dep Stella	
2023	Gangs of Lagos	Mama Oba	
2023	Shattered Innocence	Mummy Theresa	
2022	Palava	Oma Bassey	
2021	Under the carpet	Tiana	
2021	Fools' Day	Alase	
2019	Misquided		
2019	Alter Date		
2018	Divorce Not Allowed	Omotara	
2018	Smash		
2018	Thin Line	Kany	
2018	I Believe	Lola	
2017	Gone to America		
2017	Kostrobu	Sholape	
2016	Ipadabo		
2016	Gangan	Ronny	
2016	Twisted Twin		
2016	Ore		
2016	Trust		
2016	Tore Ife		
2016	Awusa		
2016	Black Val		
2016	Apo Owo		
2016	Arinzo		
2015	Beyond Disability	Bisi	
2015	Silence		
2013	Okanla		
2012	Mama Insurance		
2007	Egun		
2005	13th Day: Ọjọ Kẹtala	Debisi	
2003	Baba Darijiwon		
1998	Agogo Ide		
1998	Satanic		

=== Television ===
Television series starring Iyabo Ojo
Year	Series	Notes
2024	All of Us	4 episodes
2022	The Real Housewives of Lagos	

== Awards and nominations ==
Year	Award ceremony	Category	Film	Result	Ref
2010	Best of Nollywood Awards	Best Supporting Actress –Yoruba	Mario	Nominated	
2012	Best of Nollywood Awards	Best Supporting Actress –Yoruba	Ijo Olomo	Won	
2014	Best of Nollywood Awards	Best Actress in Leading Role – Yoruba	Silence	Nominated	
2015	Best of Nollywood Awards	Best Actress in Leading Role – English	Beyond Disability	Nominated	
2017	Best of Nollywood Awards	Best Supporting Actress –Yoruba	Gangan	Nominated	
2021	Best of Nollywood Awards	Best Supporting Actress –Yoruba	Black Veil	Nominated	

== See also ==
- List of Nigerian film producers
- List of Yoruba people
