= Chief Executive Odogwu =

Studio album by Nito-P
- Released: 5 December 2024
- Genre: Afrobeats; Afrofusion
- Length: 39:00
- Producer: Lyquidmix; DYDX; Willo

Chief Executive Odogwu is a studio album by Nigerian rapper and singer Nito-P. Released on 5 December 2024, it features Terry Apala, Eno Blaze, Singerpour, Youngdada, Teo SMA, Johntay, and Yawbankz.

== Background ==
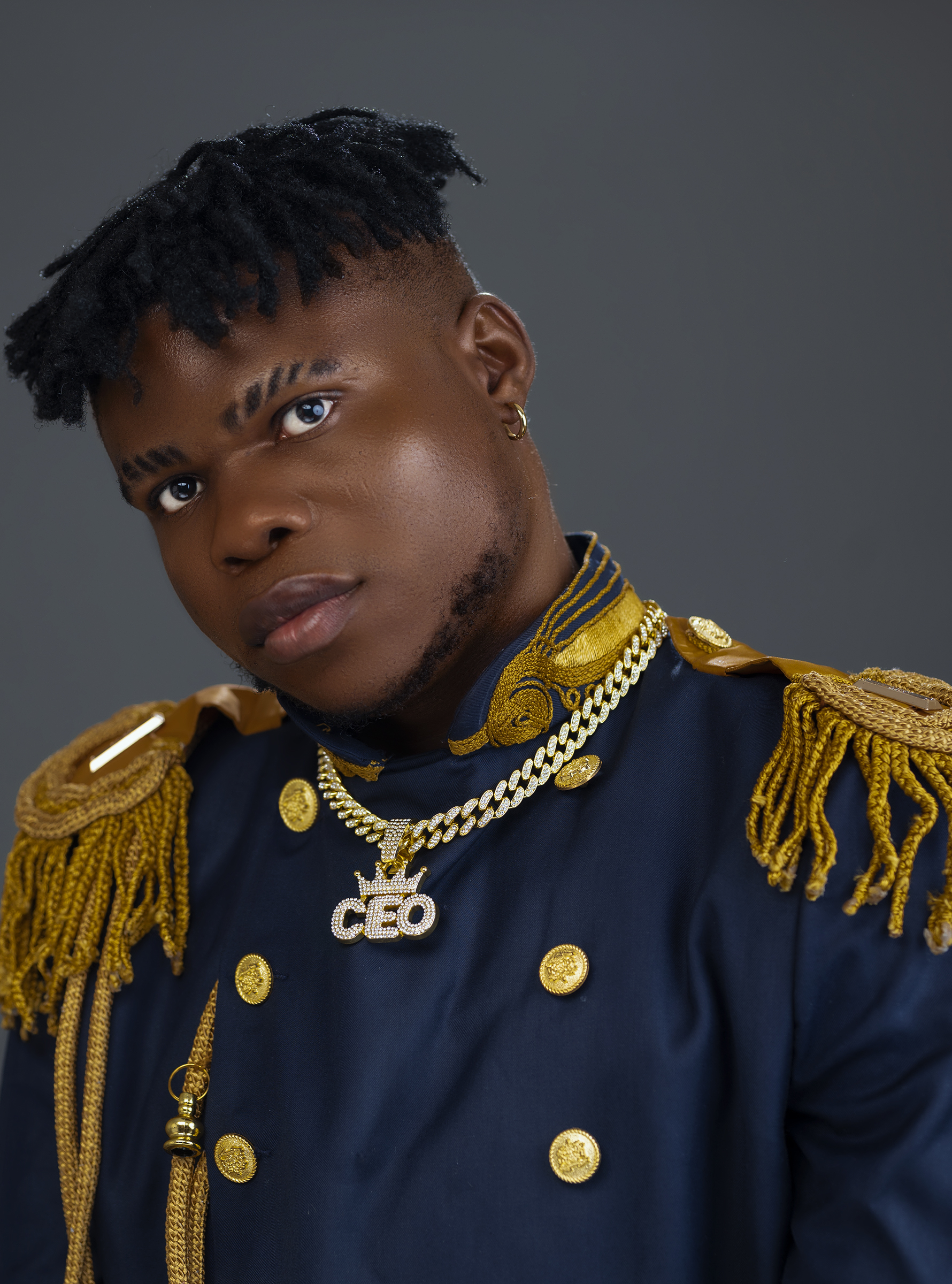
Nito-P in 2024

Born in Benin City, on 30 October 1992, Paul Otasowie Ajayi, who uses the stage name Nito-P, attended Delta State University, Abraka. He began his music career in 2012, with encouragement from friends. He released Chief Executive Odogwu, on 5 December 2024 as his first studio album following the release of his extended play, Most Wanted, which was released in July 2024.

Upon release, Chief Executive Odogwu entered the Apple Music chart at #179, rising to #88 within one day.

== Reception ==
Chief Executive Odogwu has been described as a mixture of Afrobeats and Afro fusion with a blend of "African rhythm and modern sound". Isaac Oladapo of This Day called the album "packed with dynamic energy and emotional resonance". The Nation called it a "trip around topics like life, love, heartbreak, prayer, social change and more". Ahmed Ismaila of the Nigerian Tribune called it "a brilliant conduit for themes like prayer, love, party and life".

== Track listing ==
Track listing adopted from Spotify.

Chief Executive Odogwu track listing
No.	Title	Writer(s)	Producer(s)	Length
1.	"Pack and Go"	Paul Otasowie Ajayi	Lyquidmix	2:21
2.	"ThankGod" (Featuring Terry Apala)	Paul Otasowie Ajayi	Lyquidmix	2:57
3.	"Peri-Peri"	Paul Otasowie Ajayi; Henry Adeyemi Aiguokhian	DYDX	2:52
4.	"Forever" (Featuring Eno Blaze)	Paul Otasowie Ajayi	Lyquidmix	3:12
5.	"Odogwu" (featuring Singerpour)	Paul Otasowie Ajayi	Lyquidmix	2:42
6.	"God Did"	Paul Otasowie Ajayi	Willo	2:35
7.	"Jowowa"	Paul Otasowie Ajayi	DYDX	2:57
8.	"Jeje" (Featuring Singerpour)	Paul Otasowie Ajayi	DYDX	3:32
9.	"Change"	Paul Otasowie Ajayi; Henry Adeyemi Aiguokhian	Lyquidmix	3:15
10.	"Brother" (featuring Youngdada)		DYDX	2:51
11.	"Shordy" (Featuring Teo SMA)	Paul Otasowie Ajayi	Lyquidmix	2:56
12.	"Made in Heaven" (featuring Johntay)	Paul Otasowie Ajayi	Lyquidmix	3:37
13.	"Ghetto Life" (featuring Yaw Bankz)	Paul Otasowie Ajayi	Willo	3:13
