= Faithia Williams =

Nigerian actress, film producer and director (born 1971)

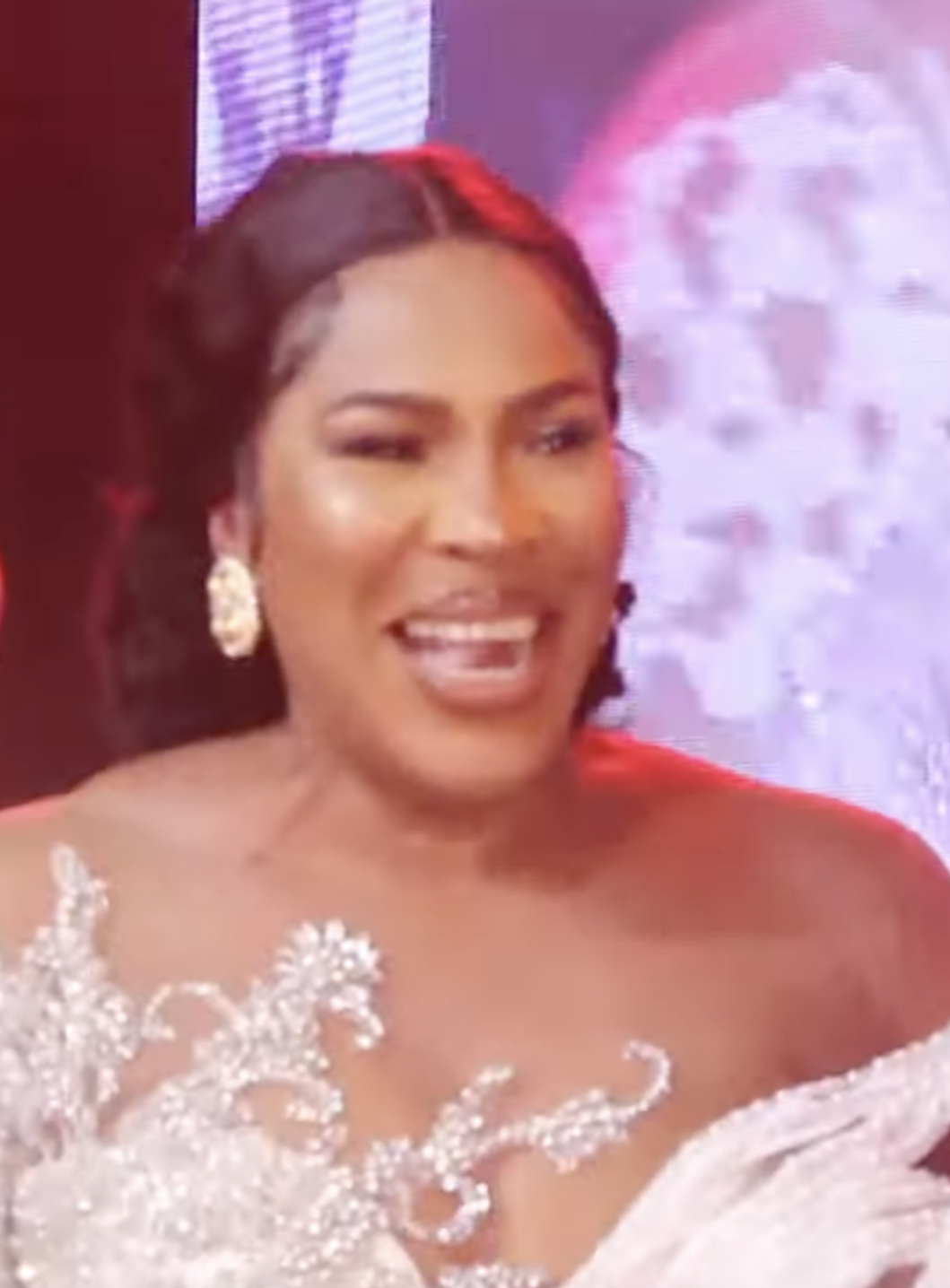
- Born: 5 February 1971 (age 55); Ikeja, Lagos State, Nigeria
- Education: Olabisi Onabanjo University; Kwara State Polytechnic
- Occupations: Actor; filmmaker; producer; director
- Years active: 1978–present
- Known for: Farayola; Eku Eda; Shola Arikusa; President Kuti; Victims
- Spouse: Saheed Balogun (divorced)
- Children: 3
- Awards: AMVCA Most Outstanding Indigenous Actress, Africa Movie Academy Award

Faithia Williams Balogun formerly Faith Williams (born 5 February 1971) is a Nigerian actress, filmmaker, producer and director.

== Early life and education ==
Faithia Williams is Urhobo from Delta state in the south-south region of Nigeria. She was born in Ikeja the Lagos state capital on 5 February 1971. She was born into a polygamous family of nine. Faithia attended Maryland Primary School and Maryland Comprehensive Secondary School in Lagos State. She obtained her West African School Certificate in Maryland Comprehensive Secondary School. After that, she studied in the Kwara State Polytechnic for a diploma certificate. In 2016, Faithia got admission into Olabisi Onabanjo University to study Filming.

== Career ==
Faithia became an actress by chance. Faithia's uncle, Alhaji Fatai Teniola, asked her to stand in for an actress that failed to show up in one of the productions of their movie. Williams played her first role in the film title "Ta lo pa chief". She has starred, produced, and directed several Nigerian films over the years. In 2008, she won the Africa Movie Academy Award for the Most Outstanding Actress Indigenous and her movie Iranse Aje won the best indigenous film of the year. In April 2014, she won the Africa Movie Academy Award, having emerged as best actress of the year along with Odunlade Adekola who emerged as best actor of the year. She also won the Best Indigenous Language award for the work done in the film "Iya Alalake" at the 2015 Africa Magic Viewers’ Choice Awards.

== Personal life ==
Williams was formerly married to veteran Nollywood actor, Saheed Balogun, with whom she has two children, a son and a daughter. Faithia also has a son from an earlier relationship. It was during this period of marriage that she changed her name from Faith Williams to Faithia Balogun, being the name of her husband, and changed her religious beliefs also.

== Awards ==
- Most Outstanding Indigenous Actress (2008)
- AMVCA Best Local Language Yoruba (2015)

== Filmography ==
- Eku Eda (2006)
- Aje meta (2008) as Mojisola
- Aje metta 2 (2008) as Mojisola
- Farayola (2009) as Niniola
- Okunkun Biribiri (2010) as Olori Faderera
- Jelili (2011) as Omobola
- Emi Abata (2012) as Ronke
- Awawu (2015)
- Teni Teka (2015)
- Omo Ale (2015)
- Agbelebu Mi (2016)
- Basira Badia (2016)
- Adakeja (2016)
- Shola Arikusa (2017) as Shola Arikusa
- 10 Days In Sun City (2017) as Ms. Ajoke
- Victims (2017) as Mama Yeni
- My Woman (2018)
- Ehi's Bitters (2018) as Ehi's Mother
- Seven and a Half Dates (2018) as Mrs. Cole
- Merry Men: The Real Yoruba Demons (2018) as Iya Abdul
- To Love Again (2018) as Mama Bose
- Mokalik (Mechanic) 2019 - as Iya Mulika
- Dear Affy (2020) as Aunty Munumidun
- Oba Bi Olorun (2021) as Oritoke
- Esin (2021) as Raheemot
- Osun, the Goddess (2021)
- President Kuti (2021) as Kobewude
- Hatred (2021)
- Alagogo Ide (2021)
- Tree (2022)
- Ojukoro (2022) as Mummy Rinsola
- Aníkúlápó (2022) as Ojumo Queen
- Eri Ife (2022) as Mummy
- Mr Perfect (2022) as Jubril's Sister
- Jagun Jagun (2023) as Erinfunto
- A Tribe Called Judah (2023) as Mama Caro
- On the Edge (2024) as Tomisin's Mum
- Beast of Two Worlds (2024) as Oyenihun
- Owambe Thieves (2025)
- Labake Olododo (2025)

== See also ==
- List of Yoruba people
