= Owo Blow =

1996 Nigerian Yoruba-language drama film

- Directed by: Tade Ogidan
- Starring: Femi Adebayo; Prince Leke Ajao; Bimbo Akintola; Adewale Elesho; Lanre Hassan; Binta Ayo Mogaji; Sam Loco Efe
- Production companies: Cinecraft Independent Films and Associates
- Release date: 1996
- Running time: 80 minutes
- Country: Nigeria
- Language: Yoruba language

Owo Blow is a 1996 Yoruba-language drama film directed by Tade Ogidan. It was made in 3 parts, namely: The Genesis, The Revolt, and The Final Struggle. It served as the first acting role for Femi Adebayo, Rachael Oniga and Bimbo Akintola.

== Background ==
The major theme of the movie surrounds showing kindness and paying it forward. It explored issues including corruption, unemployment, extrajudicial punishment, and wrongful practices by law enforcement officials, which are persistent prevailing Nigerian national issues. It is a Yoruba language film which was subtitled in English.

== Plot ==
A man was imprisoned unfairly when he tried to help some traders who were being harassed by officials of the State Task Force. This throws the man's family into disarray; his son, Wole, is sent out of school and has to rise up to provide for his family. He tries his hands at many vocations before eventually resorting to pickpocketing. He gets caught, and mob justice is meted out on him. He soon resorts to a life on the streets, while his sister, Mope, resorts to prostitution. She falls pregnant and dies in labour. Wale becomes a notorious armed robber but makes a vow not to shed human blood. He eventually makes a turnaround, completes his education, and becomes a responsible member of the society. His former gang members, however, persist in the trade. He, however, still suffers from guilt due to his previous misdeeds.

== Cast ==
- Femi Adebayo as Wole Owolabi
- Prince Leke Ajao as Garage Chairman
- Bimbo Akintola as Mope Owolabi
- Adewale Elesho
- Kunle Ajediti as Brother Femi
- Lanre Hassan as Mama Jide
- Sam Loco Efe as Baba Landlord
- Binta Ayo Mogaji as Mama Ojuju
- Kayode Odumosu as Mr. Owolabi
- Rachael Oniga as Mrs. Owolabi
- Adebayo Salami as Council Boss
- Tope Kilanko as Kehinde Owolabi

== Production and release ==
Owo Blow was classified as one of the big budget Nigerian films of 1997; the budgets ranged from ₦2-7million ($25,000-90,000). It was released at Christmas time in 1996, and a cinema ticket cost ₦150 at the time.

== Reception ==
A reviewer for Premium Times lauded the movie for its cast, directing, and brevity saying: "There was no part of the movie that was not relevant to the plot of the film. 25 years after, Owo Blow remains a classic any day."
