= Bukky Wright =

Nigerian actress (born 1967)

- Born: Oluwabukola Sekinat Ajoke Wright; 31 March 1967 (age 59); Abeokuta, Western Region, Nigeria (now in Ogun State, Nigeria)
- Citizenship: Nigeria (1967–present)
- Education: University of Lagos
- Occupations: Actress; Businesswoman; Politician
- Years active: 1996–present
- Children: 2

Oluwabukola Sekinat Ajoke Wright (born 31 March 1965), known professionally as Bukky Wright, is a Nigerian actress, businesswoman, and politician. She runs the fashion house B Collections and the beauty spa B Wright.

== Biography ==
Bukky was born to a Christian father and a Muslim mother in Abeokuta. She attended the University of Lagos, and earned a bachelor's degree in economics.

Bukky began her acting career in 1996. She has featured in several Nollywood movies of Yoruba and English languages, including Wale Adenuga's Television series Super story.

In 2014, Bukky Wright contested for the post of an Honourable in Ogun State House of Assembly under the platform of the Social Democratic Party (SDP) led by former Governor Olusegun Osoba.

== Personal life ==
Bukky Wright is married, and she has two sons, Eniola and Gbenga. She became a grandmother when one of her sons had a child.

== Politics ==
In 2014, through the Social Democratic Party, she ran for the position of Senator in Ogun State House of Representatives.

== Selected filmography ==
- Saworo ide (1999)
- Agogo Eewo (2002) as Tinuola
- Above Love (2004)
- Omotara Johnson (2004)
- Abeni (2006)
- The Narrow Path (2006)
- Outkast (2011)
- Kodun Kopo Kope (KKK)
- Arinzo (2013)
- Gidi Blues (2016) as Mrs. Kuti
- Omotara Johnson
- Unforgivable
- Afefe Alaafia
- Dugbe Dugbe
- Nkem Temi
- Ago Meje
- Oko Nnene
- Habitat
- Red Hot (2013)
- Iyore (2014) as Queen Tonyin Adekoya
- When Love Happens (2014) as Mrs. Laguda
- Poison (2018) as Sola
- Special Jollof (2020)
- Kadara (2022) as Mama Shade
- Mother-In-Law (2023) as Madam Kiola
- Red Circle (2025)
- Aso Ebi Diaries (2025)
- The Return of Omotara Johnson (2026)

== See also ==
- List of Yoruba people
