= Binta Ayo Mogaji =

Nigerian actress

- Born: 1962 or 1963 (age 63–64); Ibadan, Oyo State, Nigeria
- Occupation: Actress
- Years active: 1970s - present
- Known for: Igbalandogi
- Spouse: Victor Ayodele Oduleye
- Children: 3

Binta Ayo Mogaji (born 1962 or 1963) is a veteran Nigerian actress. According to the film critic Shaibu Husseini, Mogaji has been a part of at least 800 films, television shows, and theater productions.

== Personal life ==
Mogaji is a native of Agbo-Ile, Ibadan. Her father is an Islamic cleric, while her mother is an education administrator. In 2006, she married retired soccer player and physiotherapist Victor Ayodele Oduleye. Prior to her marriage, she was romantically involved with actor Jibola Dabo and had a son as a result of the relationship.

== Career ==
Her first home video film was Mojere, which was done in Yoruba. She was awarded "Best Actress" at the REEL Awards. In 2015, Mogaji debunked filmmakers' preference for younger generation actors in Nollywood. She explained that their reasons cannot be based on the act of professionalism, because there is nothing younger actors were doing that the older ones can't still do. In a 2018 interview with The Punch, Mogaji explained that due to her Islamic background, she has never acted semi-nude or kissed throughout her decades of practicing as an actress. She noted that producers know the type of role she can play.

=== Partial filmography ===
- Nowhere to be Found
- Why Worry the Barber?
- Sergeant Okoro
- Igbalandogi
- Mojere
- Owo Blow (1997) as Mama Ojuju
- Ti Oluwa Nile (1992)
- Motherhood
- Owo Ale
- Ileke
- Ojuju
- Ile Olorogun
- Checkmate (1991 - 1994) as Chioma
- Àkóbí Gómìnà 2 (2002) as Alhaja
- Pasito Deinde (2005)
- Eni Eleni 2 (2005)
- The Inlaws (2008) as Keji
- Mama insurance (2012 film)
- The Bridge (2017) as Olori Omolade
- A Single Story (2018) as Mummy
- Kasanova (2019) as Grandma
- Diamonds In The Sky (2019) as Kayode's Mum
- The Miracle Centre (2020)
- My Village People (2021) as Witch
- Man of God (2022) as Mummy Samuel
- Mikolo (2023) as Grandma
- Unknown Soja (2024) as Mama Sade
- Oloture: The Journey (2024 TVSeries) as Oloture's Mother
