= Odunlade Adekola =

Nigerian actor (born 1976)

- Adekola at the 2026 Toronto International Film Festival.
- Born: Odunlade Adekola; 31 December 1976 (age 49); Abeokuta, Ogun State, Nigeria
- Education: Moshood Abiola Polytechnic; University of Lagos
- Occupations: Actor; filmmaker; director; producer
- Years active: 1996–present
- Known for: Sunday Dagboru; Alani Pamolekun; Mufu Oloosha oko; Adebayo Aremu Abere; Odaju; Oyenusi; Saamu alajo; Ahamo
- Spouse: Ruth Adekola
- Children: 5
- Awards: AMVCA Best supporting Actor

Odunlade Adekola Jonathan ((born 31 December 1976) is a Nigerian actor, film-maker, film producer and film director. He gained popularity and was widely known for his lead role in Ishola Durojaye's 2003 movie, Asiri Gomina Wa, and has acted in many Nollywood movies since then. He is the founder and CEO of the Odunlade Adekola Film Production (OAFP).

== Early life and education ==
Adekola was born and raised in Abeokuta, Ogun State, and he is a native of Otun Ekiti, Ekiti State.

Odunlade Adekola attended St. John's Primary School and St. Peter's College in Abeokuta, Ogun State and then obtained the West African School Certificate (WASCE) Examination before he proceeded to Moshood Abiola Polytechnic,(MAPOLY) where he received a diploma certificate. Odunlade proceeded to further his education and in May 2018, he received a degree in Bachelors of Business Administration at the University of Lagos.

== Career ==
Odunlade Adekola began his acting career in 1996, the same year he joined the Association of Nigeria Theatre Arts practitioners. He has starred in, scripted, produced and directed several Nigerian films also known as Nollywood over the years. In April 2014, Adekola won the Africa Movie Academy Award for the best actor of the year. In December 2015, he marked his entrance into the Nigerian music industry. Photographs of Odunlade during filming are widely used as internet memes across the Nigerian websphere. On 17 September 2018, Odunlade Adekola became the brand ambassador for RevolutionPlus Property Development Company. It was indeed a remarkable day for him. He was officially unveiled as the company's Brand ambassador at their Ikeja office in Lagos. Odunlade Adekola is a brand ambassador to several organizations such as Goldberg beer and Globacom Telecommunications

== Personal life ==
Odunlade Adekola was born to Deaconess Adekola and Pastor Nathaniel .A. Adekola. His father serves as a Servant of God at a congregation of the Christ Apostolic Church (CAC) in Abeokuta, Ogun state. At the time of Odunlade's birth, his father held the position of a choirmaster in the church. Over time, he progressed in his religious journey and eventually became a pastor within the Christ Apostolic Church. Both of Odunlade's parents, Pastor Adekola and Deaconess Adekola, are devoted clergy people hailing from Ekiti, Nigeria.

He married Ruth Adekola in 2003, and has four children.

== Filmography ==
Year	Film	Role	Notes
2003	Asiri Gomina Wa	State Governor	
2006	Iku Lopin	Adegoke	
2007	Alaga Garage	Blade	
2008	Jenifa	Kola	
2009	Emi Nire Kan	Adisa	
2010	Sunday Dagboru	Sunday	
2010	Monday Omo Adugbo	Monday	
2011	Jelili	Sisi Kola	
2013	Mufu Olosa Oko	Mufu	
2014	Kabi O Osi		
2014	Oyenusi	Ishola Oyenusi	
2014	Ma Ko Fun E		
2015	Eje Tutu	Tangaran/Taiwo Smart (Identical twins)	
2015	Alani Pamolekun	Alani	
2015	Gbolahan	Deji	
2015	Oju Eni Mala		
2015	Kurukuru		
2015	Olosha		
2015	Omo Colonel		
2015	Aroba		
2015	Oro		
2015	Baleku		
2015	Babatunde Ishola Folorunsho		
2015	Adebayo Aremu Abere		
2015	Adajo Agba		
2015	Oyun Esin		
2015	Taxi Driver: Oko Ashewo	Taiwo	
2016	Sunday Gboku Gboku		
2016	Abi Eri Re Fo Ni		
2016	Igbesemi		
2016	Lawonloju		
2016	Pepeye Meje		
2016	Asiri Ikoko		
2016	Astray	Dolamu	
2016	The Grudge	Taju	
2017	Shola Arikusa	Alfa Agba	
2017	Saamu Alajo	Saamu	
2017	Pate Pate		
2017	Adura		
2017	Ere Mi		
2017	Okan Oloore		
2017	Ota		
2017	Owiwi		
2017	Agbara Emi		
2017	Critical Evidence		
2017	Olowori		
2017	Iku Lokunrin		
2017	Eku Meji		
2018	Yeye Alara	Dongari	
2018	Omo Germany		
2018	The Vendor	Gbadebo / Godwin	
2019	Ado Agbara		
2019	Agbaje Omo Onile 1, 2, 3		
2019	Gbemileke 1, 2, 3		
2020	The Legend of Inikpi	Young Attah Ayegba	
2020–present	Sammu Alajo comedy series		
2020	The Miracle Centre	Taxi Driver	
2021	President Kuti	Ayomide	
2021	Ajibade		In cinemas, December 2021
2021	Ile Alayo		
2021	My Mirror		
2022	King of Thieves	Adegbite	In cinemas, April 2022
2022	Elesin Oba, The King's Horseman	Elesin	
2022	Idande		
2022	Win or Lose	Agbabi aka	
2022	Unseen Trap	Demilade	
2023	Arinola		
2023	Deity	Oba Adefolarin	
2023	Malaika	King Towabola	
2023	Jagun Jagun	Jigan	
2023	Dabira		
2023	Apata		
2023	Orisa		
2024	Lakatabu	Lakatabu	
2024	Jiro	Sola	
2024	For My Area	Hon. Ajilo	
2024	Ruthless	Detector	
2024	Beast of Two Worlds	King Towabola	
2024	Aiyefele		
2024	Lisabi: The Uprising	Alaafin of Oyo	
2024	Alakada: Bad and Boujee	Brother Jide	
2025	Labake Olododo		
2025	Owambe Thieves	Oga Benard	
2025	Gingerrr	Adeshine	

== Awards and nominations ==
Year	Award	Category	Result	Ref
2017	Best of Nollywood Awards	Best Actor in a Lead role –Yoruba	Nominated	
2018	Africa Magic Viewers’ Choice Awards	Best Actor in a Comedy	Won	
2019	Best of Nollywood Awards	Best Supporting Actor –Yoruba	Nominated	
2022	Africa Magic Viewers' Choice Awards	Best Supporting Actor	Won	
2022	NET Honours	Most Popular Actor	Won	

== See also ==
- List of Yoruba people
- List of Nigerian actors
