= Doris Simeon =

Nigerian actress (born 1979)

- Born: Doris Simeon; 22 July 1979 (age 46); Lagos
- Citizenship: Nigerian
- Occupation: Actress
- Children: David Ademinokan

Doris Simeon (born 22 July 1979) is a Nigerian actress, compere, hairdresser and entrepreneur. She has starred in Yoruba and English language roles. She is also the CEO of Davris Beauty Centre, located in Ifako, Lagos.

== Acting career ==
Simeon initially aspired to be a newscaster, but a friend told her about an audition for a cameo role in Papa Ajasco, a situational comedy by Wale Adenuga Production (WAP). She went for the audition and secured the role. Simeon started her acting career with a part in three episodes of the Papa Ajasco comedy series. She then had roles in Nollywood films Oloju Ede, Alakada, Ten Million Naira and Modupe Temi. She also appeared in Eti Keta.

In 2010, she starred as Da Grin's girlfriend in Ghetto Dreamz and co-produced Omo Iya kan. Given her first role by actor and director Yomi Ogunmola, she rose to the top, starring in over 100 films.

Simeon is a multilingual actress who performs in Yoruba and English. She is also a master of ceremonies and TV show host.

Endorsement

In July 2015, Simeon renewed her contract with GlaxoSmithKline to be the face of Ribena, a popular children's fruit drink.

== Personal life ==
Simeon was married to producer and director Daniel Ademinokan, whom she met on set. They have a son, David, but separated in 2010.

== Filmography ==
Year	Title	Role
	Ebi Keta	
2003	Perosoko	Rose
2003	Ago kan oru	Sade
	Ten Million Naira	
	Alakada	
	Asiri	
2008	Omo Pupa	
2020	Modupe Temi	Omolara
2009	Arewa ejo	
	Iseju Marun	
2009	Omo Iya Kan	Oluwaseyi
	Ghetto Dreams	
2012	Gucci Girls	Tunmininu
2012	Mama Insurance	
2016	Silence	
2017	Owo Ago	Bukola's Friend
2018	Hannatu	
2019	True Betrayal	Lade
2019	Dear Husband	Funmilola
2019	ILU America	Stacy
2022	Abosede	Flaky

== Awards ==
- 2008 AMAA Awards Best Indigenous Actress Onitemi.
- 2010 Zafaa Awards Best Actress Indigenous Asiri
- 2015 All Youths Tush Awards AYTA Role Model (Movie) Awards
