= Oga Bello =

Nigerian actor (born 1952)

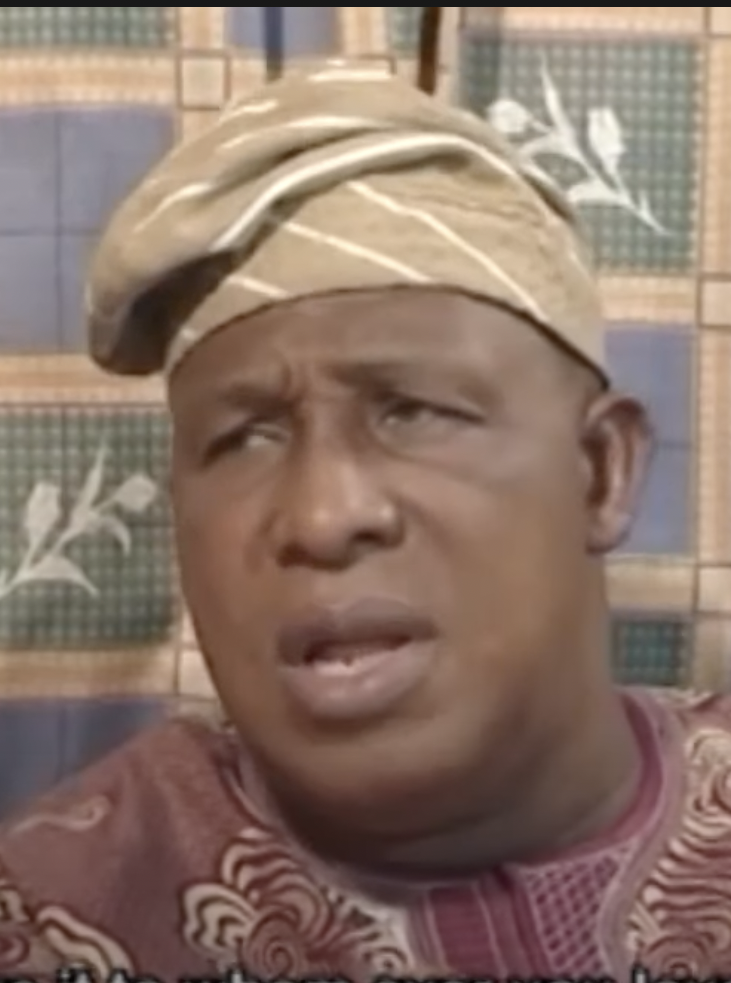
- Born: Adebayo Salami; 9 May 1952 (age 74); Lagos, Nigeria
- Occupations: Actor, filmmaker and film director
- Years active: 1964-present
- Children: Femi Adebayo

Adebayo Salami (born 9 May 1952), popularly known by his stage name "Oga Bello" is a veteran Nigerian nollywood actor, filmmaker, film producer, and director.

== Early life and education ==
Salami is a native of Pakata Oloje, Ilorin, Kwara State. He was born on the 9th of May 1953 in Lagos State where he had both his primary and secondary education.

Adebayo Salami attended Adebodun Commercial School, and later went to Lagos Drama School, a school affiliated with the University of Lagos.

== Career ==
He began his acting career in 1964, with a group called Young Concert Party, under the leadership of Ojo Ladipo, popularly known as Baba Mero. After a few years, the group changed its name to Ojo Ladipo Theatre Group and later metamorphosed into Awada Kerikeri Theatre Group. Following the demise of Ojo Ladipo in 1978, Salami took the mantle of leadership of the group, which brought him into the limelight.

He featured in the first Yoruba film, Ajani Ogun, in which the late Adeyemi Afolayan, the father of Kunle Afolayan and Gabriel Afolayan, plays the lead role.

He was also featured in a movie titled Kadara by Adeyemi Afolayan (Ade Love). He later featured in the popular Nigerian comedy series Comedy half-hour with the stage name Oga Bello.

He produced his first movie, Ogun Ajaye, in 1985, from the stable of Awada Kerikeri.

Since 1985, he has produced, directed, and featured in several Yoruba movies.

He was a pioneer member of the Association of Nigerian Theatre Arts Practitioners, and also served as president of the association.

== Personal life ==
Salami is married to two wives and has eighteen children (9 sons and 9 daughters, including actor Femi Adebayo)

== Filmography ==
Year	Film	Role
2024	Her Excellency	Producer
2024	Seven Doors	Otun
2024	Crossroads	Dunni's Father
2022	Aníkúlápó	Oyo Chief
2020	Omo Ghetto (The Saga)	Baba Onibaba
1996	Owo Blow	Council Boss

== Awards ==
- 2014 Best of Nollywood Awards

== See also ==
- List of Yoruba people
- List of Nigerian actors
