= List of Nigerian films of 1997 =

This is a list of Nigerian films released in 1997.

== Films ==
Title	Director	Cast	Genre	Notes	Ref
1997
Back to Africa	Tony Abulu	Wole Amele Ella Asad Jimmy Johnson Lanre Hassan		Produced by Black Ivory Communications	
Blood Money	Chico Ejiro	Zack Orji Kanayo O. Kanayo Francis Agu Sam Dede			
Crossroad: The Beginning	Christyn Michaels	Gbenga Richards Ngozi Nwosu Emeka Ossai Kate Henshaw			
Dead End 2	Chico Ejiro	Zack Orji Liz Benson Sandra Achums Ameze Imariahgbe		Produced by Grand Touch/Amaco and Andy Best	
Died Wretched	Kenneth Nnebue	Tony Umez Eucharia Anunobi Rachel Oniga Tom Njemaze			
Flesh and Blood: The Jessie Chukwuma Story 2	Chico Ejiro	Ameze Imarhiagbe Richard Mofe-Damijo Bassey-Inyang Ekpeyong Christy Essien Igbokwe		Shot in English Language Released on VHS by International Artists/Ami Home Entertainment	
Forever	Amaka Igwe	Justus Esiri Hilda Dokubo John Nwaobi Ohi Alegbe Jaiye Aboderin			
Hostages	Tade Ogidan	Tope Idowu Ofuafo Otomewo Richard Mofe Damijo Bimbo Manuel Lanre Slogan Tunji Sotimirin Buky Ajayi	Action		
Iya Ibeji Eleran Igbe (Mother of Twins, Seller of Bush Meat)	Abbey Lanre	Aduke Adeyemo Gbolagade Akinpelu Dupe Johnson Florence Ogunbiyi		Shot in Yoruba Language Released on VHS by Ogogo/Amazing.	
Obe Gbona (Hot Soup)		Moses Olaiya Adejumo Iya Sala Adisa Baba Oyin Adejobi		Shot in Yoruba Language Released on VHS by Alawada Movies/Bayowa Films.	
O Le Ku	Tunde Kelani	Yemi Shodimu Feyikemi Abodunrin Pauline Dike Omolola Amusan	Romantic drama	An adaptation of Prof. Akinwunmi Ishola’s novel of the same name	
Out of Bounds	Tade Ogidan	Richard Mofe Damijo Bimbo Akintola Rachael Oniga Steve Rhodes			
Owo Blow	Tade Ogidan	Prince Leke Ajao Bimbo Akintola Adewale Elesho Lanre Hassan Sam Loco Efe Binta Ayo Mogaji Kayode Odumosu Rachael Oniga Adebayo Salami			
Sango	Obafemi Lasode	Wale Adebayo Bunmi Sanya Wale Ogunyemi Jimi Sholanke Antar Laniyan		Based on the life story of Sango, the Yoruba god of thunder.	

== See also ==
- List of Nigerian films
