= List of Nigerian films of 1998 =

This is a list of Nigerian films released in 1998.

== Films ==
Title	Director	Cast	Genre	Notes	Ref
1998
Diamond Ring	Tade Ogidan	Liz Benson Richard Mofe-Damijo Bimbo Akintola Bukky Ajayi Tunji Bamishigbin Sola Sobowale Teju Gbade-Oyelakin	Horror		
Sakobi	Zeb Ejiro	Saint Obi Susan Patrick Tony Umez Edith Ujay Sunday Omobolanle Zik Okafor			
Amadas	Andy Amenechi	Enebeli Elebuwa Saint Obi Bimbo Akintola Adaora Okoh Peter Bruno Keppy Ekpeyong Bassey			
Suicide Mission	Fred Amata	Richard Mofe-Damijo Regina Askia Ameze Imarhiagbe Obot Etuk Patrick Doyle Peter Bunor Jr.			
Oracle	Andy Amenechi	Pete Edochie Prince James Uche Enebeli Elebuwa Charles Okafor Saint Obi			
Scores to Settle	Chico Ejiro	Richard Mofe Damijo Liz Benson Omotola Jalade Ekeinde			
Yogo Pam Pam	Kingsley Ogoro	Nkem Owoh Okey Bakasi			
Most Wanted	Tunji Bamishigbin	Regina Askia Ibinabo Fiberisima Ayo Adesanya Liz Benson Genevieve Nnaji Antar Laniyan	Crime action	A remake of the Hollywood crime action film of the same name featuring Jada Pinkett Smith, Queen Latifah, Vivica A. Fox and Kimberly Elise.	
Karishika	Ifeanyi Ikpoenyi	Bob Manuel Udokwu Becky Okorie Sandra Achums Obi Mmadubugo Amaechi Muonagor Sunny Mc-Don Adaora Ukoh Ifeanyi Ikpoenyi Andy Chukwu Steve Eboh	Horror	Regarded as one of the scariest Nollywood films of all time	

== See also ==
- List of Nigerian films
