= List of Nigerian films of 1999 =

This is a list of Nigerian films released in 1999.

== Films ==
Title	Director	Cast	Genre	Notes	Ref
1999
Amina: Unity in Diversity	Ndubuisi Okoh	Pete Edochie Olu Jacobs Kashimu Yaro Enebeli Elebuwa			
Chain Reaction	Ndubuisi Okoh	Liz Benson Pete Edochie Ernest Asuzu Onyeka Onwenu Rita Edochie			
Conspiracy	Ndubuisi Okoh	Onyeka Onwenu Charles Okafor Larry Koldsweat Nkem Owoh.			
Festival of Fire	Chico Ejiro	Kanayo O. Kanayo Regina Askia Saint Obi Victoria Inyama		Shot in English Language Released on VHS by Grand Touch	
Freedom 1 and 2	Chico Ejiro	Richard Mofe-Damijo Rita Nzelu Peter Edochie Jayke Aernan		Shot in English Language Released on VHS by Grand Touch	
Holygans	Tony Muonagor	Kingsley Ogbonna Ejike Metusella Charles Okafor		Shot in Pidgin Released on VHS by One-Week Productions.	
Igodo	Andy Amenechi and Don Pedro Obaseki	Pete Edochie Nobert Young Joe Layode Charles Okafor, Ignis Ekwe Chidi Mokeme Sam Dede		Credited for paving the way of epic Nollywood Movies. Parts of the film were shot at the Osun Osogbo grove.	
Ijele: Son of the Masquerade	Fred Amata	Eucharia Anunobi Olu Jacobs Sam Dede Sam Loco Efe		Shot in English Language Released on VHS by Great Movies.	
King Jaja of Opobo	Harry Agina	Haji Bello Ineye Johnny Dudafa Enebeli Elebuwa Femi Shaka		Shot in English Language Released on VHS by Sanctus Okereke/Stonecold Pictures.	
Saworoide	Tunde Kelani	Ayantunji Amoo Kunle Bamtefa Kayode Olaiya Yemi Shodimu Kola Oyewo Lere Paimo Bukky Wright Khabirat Kafidipe Kunle Afolayan	Drama		
Odum: A Tale from the Death of the Blue Lake	Chico Ejiro	Jimi Sholanke Femi Fatoba Nnamdi Eze		Shot in English Language Released on VHS by Amaco.	
Karishika 2	Christian Onu	Ifeanyi Ikpoenyi Becky Okorie Sandra Achums Obi Mmadubogu Ernest Asuzu Sunny Mc-Don Adaora Ukoh Mellisa Yesuf Uche Odoputa Frank Ello Chukwudi Onu Andy Chukwu Joseph Okechukwu	Horror	Regarded as one of the scariest Nollywood films of all time	

== See also ==
- List of Nigerian films
