= List of Nigerian films of 1996 =

This is a list of Nigerian films released in 1996.

== Films ==
Title	Director	Cast	Genre	Notes	Ref
1996
Battle of Musanga	Bolaji Dawodu	Alex Usifo Chika Anyawu Chiwetalu Agu Eucharia Anunobi Emeka Ani			
Brotherhood of Darkness	Andy Amenechi Bond Emeruwa	Patrick Doyle Zachee Orji Okechukwu Ogunjiofor Dolly Unachukwu		Produced by Videosonic	
Compromise	Chika Onukwafor	Ifeanyi Azodo Bob-Manuel Udokwu Kate Henshaw Teco Benson			
Dead End 1	Chico Ejiro	Zack Orji Liz Benson Sandra Achums Ameze Imariahgbe		Produced by Grand Touch/Amaco and Andy Best	
Domitilla	Zeb Ejiro	Sandra Achums Enebeli Elebuwa Maureen Ihua Charles Okafor Ada Ameh Kate Henshaw Basorge Tariah Jr Anne Njemanze	Romance		
Flesh and Blood: The Jessie Chukwuma Story 1	Chico Ejiro	Ameze Imarhiagbe Richard Mofe-Damijo Bassey-Inyang Ekpeyong Christy Essien Igbokwe		Shot in English Language Released on VHS by International Artists/Ami Home Entertainment	
Glamour Girls 2: The Italian Connection	Chika Onukwafo	Clarion Chukwuru-Abiola Jennifer Okereke Zack Orji Eucharia Anunobi		Shot in English Language Released on VHS by NEK Video Links.	
Hostages	Tade Ogidan	Tunji Sotimirin Bob-Manuel Udokwu Zainab Bukky Ajayi Tope Idowu Lanre Balogun Richard Mofe Damijo		It was shot in 1991 but released 5 years after. It was the first Nigerian movie that employed the use of a helicopter.	
Ikuku( Hurricane) 2	Nkem Owoh Zeb Ejiro	Nkem Owoh Pete Edochie Zach Orji Sam Loco		Shot in Igbo Language Released on VHS by Nonks/Andy Best	
Lies of Destiny	Madu Chikwendu	Franca Brown Paul Obazele Joe Nwosu Jennifer Okere		Made in 2 parts	
Mortal Inheritance	Andy Amenechi	Fred Amata Omotola Jalade Ekeinde Kunle Bamtefa	Romantic Drama	Produced by Zeb Ejiro	
Silent Night	Chico Ejiro	Ramsey Nouah Segun Arinze			
Violated	Amaka Igwe	Richard Mofe Damijo Ego Boyo Kunle Bamtefa Joke Silva Mildred Iweka Taiwo Obileye Wale Macaulay Funlola Aofiyebi-Raimi	Romantic Drama		

== See also ==
- List of Nigerian films
