= List of Nigerian films of 1995 =

This is a list of Nigerian films released in 1995.

== Films ==
Title	Director	Cast	Genre	Notes	Ref
1995
Ami Orun	Tunde Alabi-Hundeyin	Peju Ogunmola Sola Fosudo Clarion Chukwura Idowu Philips		Produced by Dudu Films	
Dark Goddess	Andy Amenechi	Regina Askia Layi Ashadele Yinka Craig Enebeli Elebuwa		Produced by Owoyemi Motion Pictures/Contech Ventures	
Deadly Affair: A True Life Story	Chico Ejiro	Dolly Unachukwu Sam Loco			
Fatal Desire: A True Life Story	Zeb Ejiro	Sydney Diala		Produced by Andy Best Productions	
Ikuku( Hurricane) 1	Nkem Owoh Zeb Ejiro	Nkem Owoh Pete Edochie Zach Orji Sam Loco		Shot in Igbo Language Released on VHS by Nonks/Andy Best	
Koseegbe	Tunde Kelani	Wole Amele Toyin Babatope Faith Eboigbe Jide Kosoko		Shot in Yoruba Language Released on VHS by Mainframe.	
Rattlesnake	Amaka Igwe	Francis Duru Nkem Owoh Anne Njemanze Bob Manuel Julius Agwu Ernest Obi Tony One week Stella Damasus Genevieve Nnaji Chris Okotie	Crime thriller	The movie was remade in 2020 as Rattlesnake: The Ahanna Story	
True Confession	Kenneth Nnebue	Zack Orji Liz Benson Sola Fosudo Jennifer Ossai	Drama		

== See also ==
- List of Nigerian films
