= List of Nigerian films of 2000 =

This is a list of Nigerian films released in 2000.

== Films ==
Title	Director	Cast	Genre	Notes	Ref
2000
Agbako: The Land of a Thousand Demons	Ojiofor Ezeanyaeche	Genevieve Nnaji Sam Dede Patience Ozokwor Steph-Nora Okere		Produced by OJ Productions	
Battle of Love	Simisola Opeoluwa	Segun Arinze Kanayo O. Kanayo Rekia Attah Ramsey Nouah		Produced by Kingsley Ogoro Productions	
Dapo Junior	Tony Dele Akinyemi	Saint Obi Mady Ooijen Leonard Odehkiran Liz Benson		Produced in Netherlands by Imani and Double A Entertainment	
First Lady: Who Is She?	Ifeanyi Ikpoeny	Zach Orji Ernest Obi Barbara Udoh		Shot in English Language Released on VHS by Orange Seed Movies/Cosnoris.	
Ibuka: King of the Forest	Lancelot Imasuen	Pete Edochie Sam Dede Uche Obi Osutule Amatu Braide		Shot in English Language Released on VHS by OJ Productions	
Intimate Strangers	Zeb Ejiro	Richard Mofe Damijo Eucharia Anuobi Edith Jane Azu Zack Orji Clem Ohameze Femi Allen Mimi Ejiro		Shot in English Language Produced by Zeb Ejiro	
Issakaba 1-4	Lancelot Imasuen	Sam Dede Zulu Adigwe Chiwetalu Agu Pete Eneh		Shot in English Language and Pidgin Released on VHS by Kas-Vid	
Last Burial: Will His Soul Rest in Peace? 1-3.	Lancelot Imasuen	Clement Ohameze Eucharia Anunobi Sam Dede Chika Anyanwu		Shot in English Language Released on VHS by Kas-Vid and Mosco	
Ngene: The Mistake of the Past Millenium	Ndubuisi Okoh	Kanayo O. Kanayo Chiyere Wilfred Ann Ohume Prince James Uche		Shot in English Language Released on VCD by Emeka Obiakunwa/Nwaeze Investments	
Oduduwa	Andy Amenechi	Peter Fatomilola Femi Fatoba Bukky Ajayi Pete Edochie		Shot in English Language Released on VHS by 21st Century African Fox and Ojo Jolu Films.	
Oganigwe: My Love Is Your Love	Fred Amata	Olu Jacobs Kenneth Okonkwo Zulu Adigwe Amaechi Muonagor	Fantasy	Shot in English Language Released on VHS by Solid Productions.	
State of Emergency	Teco Benson	Saint Obi Bimbo Manuel Ejike Asiegbu Rachael Oniga	Drama	Produced by Ossy Afason	
Vuga	Simi Opeodu	Gentle Jack Regina Askia Segun Arinze Ramsey Nouah Tony Aleg Lanre Balogan Chiwetalu Agu Larry Koldsweat	Adventure	Shot in English Language Produced by Uzodinma Okpechi	

== See also ==
- List of Nigerian films
