= List of Nigerian films of the 1980s =

This is a list of Nigerian films released in the 1980s.

== Films ==
Title	Director	Genre	Notes	Ref
1980
Jaiyesinmi	Frederic Goode Hubert Ogunde	Drama		
Kadara	Ade-Love	Drama		
1981
Rise and Fall of Idi Amin	Sharad Patel	Biography, Drama	British-Kenyan-Nigerian co-production	
Cry Freedom	Ola Balogun	Drama		
Efunsetan Aniwura	Bankole Bello			
1982
Orun Mooru	Ola Balogun	Drama	Shot on 35mm, but was reduced to 16mm for distribution and exhibition	
Aropin N'Tenia	Frederic Goode Hubert Ogunde			
Anikura	Oyewole Olowomojuore			
1983
Money Power	Ola Balogun			
Taxi Driver	Ade-Love	Drama		
Evil Encounter	Jimi Odumosu	Horror	First Nigerian film released directly on television	
Aare Agbaye	Moses Olaya Adejumo Oyewole Olowomojuore			
1984
Papa Ajasco	Wale Adenuga	Drama	Described as the first blockbuster in Nigeria, grossing approximately ₦61,000 in three days	
Vengeance of the Cult	Eddie Ugbomah			
1985
Mosebolatan	Moses Olaiya		Described as the film grossed ₦107,000 in five days	
Kannakanna	Bayo Aderohunmu			
1986
Witchdoctor of the Livingdead	Charles Abi Enonchong	Horror	First Nigerian film released on video	
Apalara	Eddie Ugbomah			
Ayanmo	Hubert Ogunde	Drama		
1987
Things Fall Apart	David Orere	Drama	Based on the 1958's novel by Chinua Achebe	
Taxi Driver 2	Ade-Love	Drama		
1988
Vigilante	Adedeji Adesanya	Action		
Soso Meji	Ade Ajiboye			
1989
Koto Orun	Alhaji Yekini Ajileye	History, Drama, Family	Made in Yoruba language	
The Great Attempt	Eddie Ugbomah			
Ekun	Alade Aromire			

== See also ==
- List of Nigerian films
