= List of Nigerian films of 2001 =

This is a list of Nigerian films released in 2001.

== Films ==
Title	Director	Cast	Genre	Notes	Ref
2001
Girls Hostel 1 and 2	Ndubuisi Okoh	Olu Jacobs Empress Njamah Alexandra Lopez Uche Jombo		Released on VHS and produced by Christian Dior and Catwalk Pictures	
Holy Law: Sharia	Ejike Asiegbu	Alex Usifo Ejike Asiegbu Ibrahim Mandawari Rachael Oniga		Released on VHS and produced by Kingstream Productions	
Last Prophet	Lancelot Imasuen	Zulu Adigwe Ejike Asiegbu Franca Brown Larry Koldsweat		VHS Release	
Oil Village 1 and 2	Kalu Anya	Sam Loco Efe Sam Obiekheme Sandra Achums Nnamdi Eze		Released on VHS and produced by Hycromax Investments	
Okuzu Massacre: The Robbers Revenge	John Evah	Segun Arinze Hanks Anuku Amaechi Muonagor Gentle Jack		Released on VHS and produced by Grand Touch Pictures and CE-MAX Investment	
Outkast	Chico Ejiro	Sandra Achums; Lilian Bach	Thriller		

== See also ==
- List of Nigerian films
