= List of Nigerian films of the 1970s =

This is a list of Nigerian films released in the 1970s.

== Films ==
Title	Director	Genre	Notes	Ref
1970
Kongi's Harvest	Ossie Davis	Drama	Adapted from the 1965 play by Wole Soyinka	
1971
Things Fall Apart	Hans Jürgen Pohland	Drama	Based on the 1958's novel by Chinua Achebe	
1972
1973
1974
Bull Frog in the Sun	Sanya Dosunmu			
1975
Dinner with the Devil	Sanya Dosunmu Wole Amele			
Amadi	Ola Balogun	Biography	the first notable Nigerian historical film on celluloid	
1976
Countdown at Kusini	Ossie Davis	Action, Drama	American-Nigerian co-production, mainly known as Cool Red	
Shehu Umar	Adamu Halilu	Drama		
Ajani Ogun	Ola Balogun	Musical		
1977
Bisi, Daughter of the River	Jab Adu Ladi Ladebo Joseph Abiodun Babajide	Fantasy	One of the highest grossing Nigerian films to date	
The Rise and Fall of Dr. Oyenuzi	Eddie Ugbomah			
1978
Musik-Man	Ola Balogun	Musical		
1979
Black Goddess	Ola Balogun	Drama, History	Nigerian-Brazilian co-production, screened at the 1980 Carthage Film Festival	
Ija Ominira	Ola Balogun	Drama		
Aiye	Ola Balogun	Drama, Family		

== See also ==
- List of Nigerian films
