= Outkast (film) =

2001 Nigerian crime-drama film

- Directed by: Chico Ejiro
- Produced by: Chico Ejiro
- Starring: Sandra Achums; Lilian Bach; Saidi Balogun; Jude Ezenwa
- Production company: Grand Touch Pictures
- Distributed by: Serafim Productions (Europe)
- Release date: 2001
- Country: Nigeria
- Language: English

Outkast is a 2001 Nigerian crime-drama film produced and directed by Chico Ejiro.

== Plot ==
The movie involves a group of Nigerian sex workers who are deported from Italy. When they return to Lagos, they resort to violent crime and exploitation to make money.

== Cast ==
- Lucinda Abazie
- Sandra Achums
- Percy Aigobojie
- Lilian Bach
- Bobby Ejike
- Saidi Balogun
- Jude Ezenwa
- Shan George
- Njideka Nnamani
- Lilian Nwosu
- Sola Sobowale
- Bob-Manuel Udokwu
- Francis Okonkwo
- Bukky Wright

== See also ==
- List of Nigerian films of 2001
