= List of Nigerian films of 2002 =

This is a list of Nigerian films released in 2002.

== Films ==
Title	Director	Cast	Genre	Notes	Ref
2002
Aki na Ukwa	Amayo Uzo Philips	Osita Iheme Chinedu Ikedieze Amaechi Muonagor Frances Nsonwu Ikoroha	Comedy	First Aki and Pawpaw collaboration	
Formidable Force	Teco Benson	Hanks Anuku Ernest Asuzu George Davidson Genevieve Nnaji	Action Thriller	Shot in English Language Released on VCD by Reemmy Jes	
Okada Man	Tchidi Chikere	Nkem Owoh Patience Ozokwor Pete Eneh David Ihesie	Drama	Shot in English Language and Pidgin Released on VCD by Sunny Collins/Great Movies	
The Last Vote	Andy Amenechi	Sam Dede Olu Jacobs Acho Ugenyi Sandra Achums		Released on VHS	

== See also ==
- List of Nigerian films
