= Sakobi =

- Directed by: Zeb Ejiro
- Produced by: Zeb Ejiro
- Production company: Zeb Ejiro Productions
- Release date: 1998
- Running time: 107 minutes
- Country: Nigeria
- Language: English

Sakobi is a 1998 Nigerian fantasy horror film directed and produced by Zeb Ejiro. The film stars Saint Obi and Susan Patrick, alongside Tony Umez, Edith Ujay, Sunday Omobolanle, Patience Oghre, Basorge Tariah Jr., and Zik Zulu Okafor. In the film, a snake girl entices a man named Frank Davies into using his daughter for a ritual. He faces the consequences of his actions alongside his wife.

== Plot ==
A young man named Frank Davies is introduced to Sakobi by his friend Patrick due to Frank's desperation for wealth. Sakobi, who belongs to the cult of Kongodis and worships the goddess known as the Mighty Serpent, instructs Frank to sacrifice his only daughter, Hope, for rituals. Another condition set by Sakobi is that Frank must marry her, which leads Frank to abandon his family. In the end, the goddess rejects the sacrifice of Hope and curses Frank with a short life. When Frank attempts to appease the gods through a native doctor, Sakobi, the snake girl, swallows him after the native doctor vanishes.

== Cast ==
- Saint Obi as Frank Davies
- Susan Patrick as Sakobi
- Princess Akor as Sakobi's mother
- Emmanuel Frank as Sakobi's father
- Dusty Edet as Native Doctor
- Patience Oghre as Nene
- Gloria Ogunjiofor as Dora Davies
- Domitilla Oleka as Mighty Serpent
- Tony Umez as Patrick
- Mimi Ejiro as Hope Davies

The film was released on August 5 1998

The film also featured Edith Ujay, Sunday Omobolanle, Zik Zulu Okafor and Basorge Tariah Jr. in supporting roles.

== See also ==
- List of Nigerian films of 1998
