= List of Nigerian films before 1970 =

This is a list of Nigerian films released before 1970.

== Colonial era ==
=== 1920s ===
Title	Director	Genre	Notes	Ref
1926
Palaver	Geoffrey Barkas	Adventure	Recognized as the first Nigerian feature film, for its use of non-professional local Nigerian as actors	

=== 1930s ===
Title	Director	Genre	Notes	Ref
1935
Sanders of the River	Zoltán Korda	Adventure, Drama	British film set in Colonial Nigeria	
1937
The High Command	Thorold Dickinson	Drama	British film shot in Colonial Nigeria	

=== 1940s ===
Title	Director	Genre	Notes	Ref
1945
The Man from Morocco	Mutz Greenbaum	Action, Adventure	British film featuring Nigerian actor Orlando Martins	
1946
Men of Two Worlds	Thorold Dickinson	Drama	British film featuring Nigerian actor Orlando Martins (uncredited)	
1947
North and South of the Niger	John Page	Cocumentary	British black-and-white documentary	
1949
Daybreak in Udi	Terry Bishop	Documentary	British black-and-white documentary Winner of the Oscar for Best Documentary in 1950	

=== 1950s ===
Title	Director	Genre	Notes	Ref
1956
Nigeria Greets Her Queen	Lionel Snazelle	Documentary	The first Nigerian documentary film to be shot in colour	
1957
Fincho	Sam Zebba	Drama	The first Nigerian scripted film to be shot in colour	
Freedom	Vernon Messenger	Drama	Nigerian drama shot in colour	
1958
People like Maria	Harry Watt	Documentary	British black-and-white documentary	

== Republical era ==
=== 1960s ===
Title	Director	Genre	Notes	Ref
1960
Iju	Lionel Snazelle	Documentary	British black-and-white documentary	
1966
Give Me a Riddle	David Schickele	Drama	American-Nigerian black-and-white co-production	
1969
One Nigeria	Ola Balogun	Documentary	Nigerian black-and-white documentary	

== See also ==
- List of Nigerian films
