= State of Emergency (2004 film) =

2004 film directed by Teco Benson

- Directed by: Teco Benson
- Release date: 2004
- Country: Nigeria
- Language: English

State of Emergency is a Nigerian action movie about ministers of state in Nigeria being taken hostage by armed robbers who wanted a ransom from the state.

== Cast ==
- Ejike Asiegbu as Chief Inspector
- Bimbo Manuel as Kevin
- Saint Obi as Smith
- Rachael Oniga as Mrs. Clark
- J.T. Tom West as Charles
