= Basorge Tariah Jr. =

Nigerian actor and comedian (born 1967)

- Born: Basoene Kelsey Tariah, Jr. 9 June 1967 (age 59)
- Education: University of Port Harcourt
- Occupations: Actor; Comedian
- Spouse: Doris Tariah
- Children: 4

Basorge Tariah Jr. (born June 9, 1967) is a Nigerian actor and comedian.

== Early life and education ==
Tariah Jr. is from Buguma, Kalabari, in Rivers State, Nigeria. He has a Bachelor of Arts degree in Theatre Arts from the University of Port Harcourt.

== Career ==
Tariah Jr. made his first professional appearance as a stand-up comedian at the University of Port Harcourt in 1989 and was paid 171 naira ($24, per the 1989 exchange rate) for the job. He has been described as an ace actor and Nollywood veteran by a reputable Nigerian media house, The Punch. Tariah Jr. is best remembered for his role as Do Good in Zeb Ejiro’s award-winning soap opera Candle Light, where he starred alongside Kate Henshaw.

== Personal life ==
Tariah Jr. is married to Doris Basoene Tariah, and together they have four children. In 2017, the former governor of Rivers State and Nigerian Minister of Transportation, Rotimi Amaechi, organized a birthday party for Tariah Jr. for his 50th birthday.

== Selected filmography ==
- Camouflage (2020) as Oghene
- Lagos Landing (2018) as A.K.
- Run (2017)
- Head Gone (2014)
- The Meeting (2012) as Prof. Akpan Udofia
- Felicima: One Gift (2009) as Charles
- Blood On Ice (2006) as Dean
- Playing Games (2004)
- Fools (2003)
- Unforgeable (2003)
- Runs! (2002) as James
- My Guy (1999)
- Sakobi (1998) as Lewis
- Full Moon (1998) as Nana
- Domitilla (1996) as Tony
- Silent Night (1996)
