= Akinwale =

Akinwale is a Nigerian name. Notable people with the name include:

- Akinwale Arobieke (1961–2025), British convicted criminal
- Ayo Akinwale (1946–2020), Nigerian actor, producer, and academician
- Joseph Edet Akinwale Wey (1918–1991), Nigerian naval officer
