= Maureen Ihua =

Nigerian actress

- Born: Rivers State
- Citizenship: Nigeria
- Occupation: Actress
- Children: 5

Maureen Ihua is a Nollywood actress who acted in movies such as Domitila, Unplanned, and Unpredictable. She acted alongside Liz Benson and Regina Askia.

== Early life and education ==
Ihua is from Rivers State and attended Mariam Girls Secondary School.

== Career ==
She has featured in about 100 movies in the Nollywood industry.

== Filmography ==
- Domitila (1996) as Mrs. Lawson
- Blood Money (1997) as Lilian
- The millions (2019)
- Unpredictable (2022)
- Unplanned (2021)
- The Game (2022) as Mrs. Leventes
- Mama's big stick (2022)
- Spirit of love (2006) as Christy
- Masked (2022)
- Legend at 60

== Personal life ==
Ihua is married and has five children.
