= Scores to Settle =

- Directed by: Chico Ejiro
- Starring: Richard Mofe-Damijo, Liz Benson, Omotola Jalade, Teco Benson, Patrick Doyle
- Release date: 1998
- Country: Nigeria
- Language: English

Scores to settle is a 1998 Nigerian drama film directed by Chico Ejiro. The story follows a widow who faces different struggles. The film was released on 1 January 1998 by Great movies Ltd.

== Cast ==
- Richard Mofe-Damijo
- Liz Benson
- Omotola Jalade
- Rich Azu
- Teco Benson
- Patrick Doyle
- Obot Etuk
- Tony Muonagor
- Bukky Ajayi
- Clem Ohameze

== Synopsis ==
Sade, a widow, was chased out by her in-laws with her two children and had to struggle for survival on the streets.
