= Antar Laniyan =

Nigerian film actor, producer, and director

- Born: Osogbo, Osun, Nigeria
- Education: University of Ibadan, BA in theatre arts
- Alma mater: University of Ibadan
- Occupations: Film actor and producer
- Years active: 1981–present
- Notable work: Sango

Antar Laniyan is a Nigerian veteran actor, film producer, and director.

== Early life ==
Laniyan was born in Osogbo, the capital of Osun State southwestern Nigeria. He attended Baptist Secondary School where he obtained his (WAEC) certificate in Lagos State before he later proceeded to the University of Ibadan where he obtained a Bachelor of Arts degree in theatre arts.

In a December 2025 appearance on Behind the Fame, Laniyan explained the origin of his stage name, saying his mother told him he remained in her womb for 18 months, an unusually delayed delivery that caused alarm among relatives and led the family to seek traditional guidance after hospitals could offer no explanation. He said his mother was advised to eat a creature known in Yoruba as anta, described as smaller than a crocodile but shaped like a lizard, and that he was born within an hour of her doing so; he said his birth name derived from anta, and that he added an "r" to the spelling in primary school after classmates teased him about it.

== Career ==
Laniyan began acting in 1981, and the first major role he played as a professional actor was the role of a "major general" in a film titled Everybody Wants to Know during his days at the Kakaki Art Squad. He has featured in several Nigerian films, including Sango, a film scripted by Wale Ogunyemi and produced by Obafemi Lasode. He was the director of the first episode of Super Story, the award-winning Nigerian soap opera produced by Wale Adenuga in the year 2000. He also directed Oh Father Oh Daughter and This Life, produced from the stable of Wale Adenuga Production.

== Selected filmography ==
- Sango (1997)
- Super story (episode 1)
- The Return of Jenifa (2011)
- Kabiosi (2015) as Obaleye
- Black Val (2016)
- Atupa (2018) Dad Enitan
- Lucifer (2019)
- Kakanfo (2020) as Chief Depo
- The Cleanser (2021)
- Alimi (2021) as Mr. Baruwa
- Afua (2021) as Coach
- Oro Ife (2022) as Kabiesi
- Ijakumo: The Born Again Stripper (2022) as Chief Gbadamosi
- Covenant (2022 TV Series) as MKI
- IGE - the unlikely oil merchant (2023) as Chief Ojora

== See also ==
- List of Yoruba people
