= Domitilla (film) =

- Produced by: Zikoko
- Release date: 1996
- Country: Nigeria
- Language: English

Domitilla is a 1996 Nigerian film starring Anne Njemanze, Sandra Achums, Ada Ameh, and Kate Henshaw about a young woman struggling to make ends meet as a Lagos prostitute. A sequel, Domitilla 2, was released in 1999, and a remake was released in 2023.

== Plot ==
Office secretary Ngozi moonlights as a prostitute at night under the alias Domitilla, alongside her friends Jenny, Anita, and Judith. Her earnings barely cover both her living expenses and her invalid father's medical bills. After her love interest, John, calls time on their budding relationship upon discovering her double life, Domitilla attends a high-society gathering with her friends where she meets wealthy politician Lawson, who becomes her benefactor. However, her world turns on its head when the politician is found dead in their hotel room after a night of frolicking with her, with all evidence pointing in Domitilla's direction.

== Cast ==
- Ann Njemanze as Domitilla
- Sandra Achums as Judith
- Ada Ameh as Anita
- Kate Henshaw as Jenny
- Charles Okafor as John
- Enebeli Elebuwa as Dr Lawson
- Maureen Ihua as Mrs. Lawson
- Sam Arogundade as Domitilla's boss
- Ejiro Benjamin as state counsel
- Kate Effiong as Helen's auntie
- Melvin Ejiro as Peter
- Iyabo Lawani as Judge
- Sunny McDon as Jeff
- Moji Danisa as Domitilla's lawyer
