= Jimmy Johnson (actor) =

Nigerian actor (1940–2020)

- Born: Jimmy Johnson; 1940; Nigeria
- Died: 8 July 2020 (aged 79–80); Abuja
- Occupation: Actor

Jimmy Johnson (1940 − 8 July 2020) was a Nigerian actor, writer, and broadcaster, best known for his role as Okoro of the Nigerian Television Authority 1980s TV series The Village Headmaster. On July 8, 2020, Johnson died at Garki Hospital, Abuja, at the age of 80.

== Career ==
Beginning his stage career in Ibadan in the early 1960s, Johnson worked with Wole Soyinka in the Orisun Theatre Company and at the Mbari Club, a centre for cultural activity that attracted writers, artists, and musicians of African descent from all over Africa, the Americas, and the Caribbean, including Soyinka, Ulli Beier, Chinua Achebe, Christopher Okigbo, Mabel Segun, J. P. Clark, Christopher Kolade, Lindsay Barrett, Demas Nwoko, Tunji Oyelana, Jimi Solanke and Bruce Onobrakpeya.

Johnson entered into public service after the Nigeria Civil War (1967–1970) and worked as AN information and culture officer.
