= Oge Okoye =

Nigerian actress (born 1980)

- Born: 16 November 1980 (age 45); London, United Kingdom
- Education: Theatre arts, Nnamdi Azikiwe University
- Occupation: Actress
- Years active: 2002–present

Oge Okoye (//; born 16 November 1980) is a Nigerian actress. She is from Nnewi in Anambra State, but was born and educated in London.

== Education ==
Okoye attended the University Primary School Enugu and moved on to the Holy Rosary College, Enugu for her secondary school. She graduated with a degree in theatre arts from Nnamdi Azikiwe University.

Okoye joined Nollywood in 2001 and came to limelight in 2002 after performing in the film Spanner, where she starred with Chinedu Ikedieze. She married Stanley Duru in 2005 and had two kids. The couple separated in 2012. In 2006, she was nominated for the African Movie Academy Award for the Best Actress in a supporting role for her performance in Eagle's Bride.

== Filmography ==
- Spanner (2002)
- Endika Torices (2002)
- Blood Sister (2003) as Tricia
- Forever Yours (2003)
- Handsome (2003)
- Magic Love (2003)
- My Command (2003) as Nwine
- Sister Mary (2003) as Sister Mary
- Billionaires Club (2003) as Oby
- Arsenal (2004)
- Beautiful Faces (2004)
- I Believe in You (2004)
- Indecent Girl (2004) .... O'rel
- I Want Your Wife (2004) as Lara
- Little Angel (2004)
- My Desire (2004)
- Separate Lives (2004)
- Spanner 3 (2004)
- Spanner Goes to Jail (2004)
- 11:45... Too Late (2005)
- Beyond Passion (2005)
- Black Bra (2005) as Irene
- Crazy Passion (2005) as Tonia
- Desperate Love (2005)
- Eagle's Bride (2005) as Adaeze
- Emotional Battle (2005)
- Every Single Day (2005)
- Face of Africa (2005) as Ukheria
- Friends & Lovers (2005)
- The Girl Is Mine (2005)
- It's Juliet or No One (2005)
- The King's Son (2005)
- Marry Me (2005)
- Orange Groove (2005)
- Paradise to Hell (2005)
- Shock (2005)
- To Love and Live Again (2005)
- Trinity (2005)
- Trouble Maker (2005)
- War Game (2006)
- The Snake Girl (2006) as Ugonma
- The Faculty (2007) as Shakira
- Pride of a Woman (2007) as Victoria
- Solid Affection (2008) as Sandra
- Corporate Maid (2008) as Betty
- Sincerity (2009) as Joanne
- Blackberry Babes (2010) as Damisa
- Bitter Generation (2010) as Uche
- Sinful Game
- Turning Point (2012)
- Festac Town (2014)
- Deceptive Heart (2016) as Rose
- Famously Single (2017)
- Chasing Rainbows (2017) as Clara
- Mr & Mrs Posh (2018) as Jessica
- Family Slavery (2018) as Jane
- Wetin Women Want (2018) as Adaora
- Unforgotten (2018) as Emy
- Wede (2019) Edewede
- Room Mates (2019) as Lola
- The Gift (2019)
- Drunk in Jealousy (2021) as Grace
- Royal Quest (2021)
- Heat (2022) as Charlotte
- Hide My Shame (2022) as Olivia
- Life in Pieces (2024)

=== Television series ===
Year	Title	Role	Director	Ref
2015	María Auxiliadora (Football cup)	Patricia the Chamber Maid	—N/a	
