= Lists of Nigerian films =

This is a list of films / movies produced in Nigeria by year of release.

== 20th century ==
- List of Nigerian films before 1970
- List of Nigerian films of the 1970s
- List of Nigerian films of the 1980s
- List of Nigerian films of 1992
- List of Nigerian films of 1993
- List of Nigerian films of 1994
- List of Nigerian films of 1995
- List of Nigerian films of 1996
- List of Nigerian films of 1997
- List of Nigerian films of 1998
- List of Nigerian films of 1999

== 21st century ==
- List of Nigerian films of 2000
- List of Nigerian films of 2001
- List of Nigerian films of 2002
- List of Nigerian films of 2003
- List of Nigerian films of 2004
- List of Nigerian films of 2005
- List of Nigerian films of 2006
- List of Nigerian films of 2007
- List of Nigerian films of 2008
- List of Nigerian films of 2009
- List of Nigerian films of 2010
- List of Nigerian films of 2011
- List of Nigerian films of 2012
- List of Nigerian films of 2013
- List of Nigerian films of 2014
- List of Nigerian films of 2015
- List of Nigerian films of 2016
- List of Nigerian films of 2017
- List of Nigerian films of 2018
- List of Nigerian films of 2019
- List of Nigerian films of 2020
- List of Nigerian films of 2021
- List of Nigerian films of 2022
- List of Nigerian films of 2023
