= Zózimo Bulbul =

Brazilian actor, filmmaker and activist (1937–2013)

Zózimo Bulbul (September 21, 1937 – January 24, 2013) was a Brazilian actor, filmmaker, and activist. Bulbul was a prominent proponent of Afro-Brazilian culture within Brazilian cinema and society at-large. Bulbul co-founded and organized the Encontro de Cinema Negro Brasil, África & Américas, which showcases films featuring African and Afro-Brazilian actors, directors, and themes.

Bulbul made his film debut in the 1962 Brazilian motion picture, Cinco Vezes Favela. He went on to star in more than thirty films throughout his career, including Quilombo and Sagarana: The Duel. Bulbul was also a filmmaker and film director. His best known work was his Abolição, which he released in 1988. Through Abolição, Bulbul explored the 100th anniversary of the abolition of slavery in Brazil. (Slavery was outlawed by the Lei Áurea in 1888.)

Bulbul lived abroad in New York City during the height of the Brazilian dictatorship in the 1970s.

His life and work were depicted in the 2006 documentary Zózimo Bulbul. The film was directed by Lázaro Ramos as part of the Canal Brasil TV series Retratos Brasileiros.

Zózimo Bulbul died from a heart attack at his apartment in the Flamengo neighborhood of Rio de Janeiro on January 24, 2013, at the age of 75. He was survived by his wife of thirty years, Biza Vianna. He was buried at São Francisco Xavier cemetery in the Caju neighborhood of the city.

== Filmography ==
Year	Title	Role	Notes
1962	Cinco vezes Favela		(segment "Pedreira de São Diego")
1963	Ganga Zumba		
1965	Grande Sertão		
1966	Onde a Terra Começa		
1967	Entranced Earth	Reporter	
1967	Proezas de Satanás na Vila de Leva e Tráz		
1967	Garota de Ipanema		
1967	El justicero	Dudu da Briga	
1968	O Homem Nu		
1968	O Engano	Lover	
1969	Operaçao Tumulto		
1969	O Cangaceiro Sem Deus		
1969	Compasso de Espera	Jorge	
1969	A Compadecida	Manuel / Frade	
1970	República da Traição		
1970	The Palace of Angels	Ambassador from Senegal	
1970	Jardim de Guerra		
1970	A Guerra dos Pelados		
1971	Quando as Mulheres Paqueram		
1972	Os Sóis da Ilha de Páscoa	Helvio	
1973	Sagarana: The Duel		
1974	El Encanto del amor prohibido		
1974	Pureza Proibida	Chico	
1974	Brutos Inocentes		
1975	Ana, a Libertina		
1979	Black Goddess	Babatunde	
1980	Parceiros da Aventura	Grevista	
1980	Giselle	Jorge	
1983	A Menina e o Estuprador	Pedro	
1984	Quilombo	Stone Man	
1987	Tanga (Deu no New York Times?)		
1988	Natal da Portela		
2002	The Forest	Procópio	
2004	Filhas do Vento	Marquinho	
2005	O Veneno da Madrugada	Carmichael	
2010	5x Favela, Agora por Nós Mesmos	Homem do Bar	(final film role)
