= Proezas de Satanás na Vila de Leva e Tráz =

Proêzas de Satanás na Vila de Leva-e-Traz
- Directed by: Paulo Gil Soares
- Screenplay by: José Joffily; Nelson Nadotti
- Produced by: Jarbas Barbosa; Therezinha Muniz
- Starring: Emmanuel Cavalcanti; Joffre Soares; Isabella
- Cinematography: José Medeiros; Vitalino Muratori; Angelo Riva
- Edited by: Rafael Justo Valverde
- Music by: Caetano Veloso
- Production company: J. B. Produções Cinematográficas
- Release date: 14 December 1967
- Running time: 90 minutes
- Country: Brazil
- Language: Portuguese

Proezas de Satanás na Vila de Leva e Tráz (Satan's Feats in the Village of Leva-e-Traz) is a 1967 Brazilian film directed by Paulo Gil Soares. It is considered part of the Cinema Novo movement in Brazil, where social commentary about modern progress and development is thinly disguised as a Horror film (in this case).

== Cast ==
- Emmanuel Cavalcanti ... One-armed Man
- Joffre Soares ... Blind Man
- Isabella ... Devout Woman
- Joel Barcellos ... Catcher of Souls
- Thelma Reston ... (as Telma Reston)
- Zózimo Bulbul
- Joseph Guerreiro ... Priest
- Paulo Broitma ... Knight

== Awards ==
1967: Brasília Film Festival

1. Best Film (won)
2. Best Screenplay (won)
3. Best Music (won)
