= Elke Maravilha =

German-Brazilian actress and model (1945–2016)

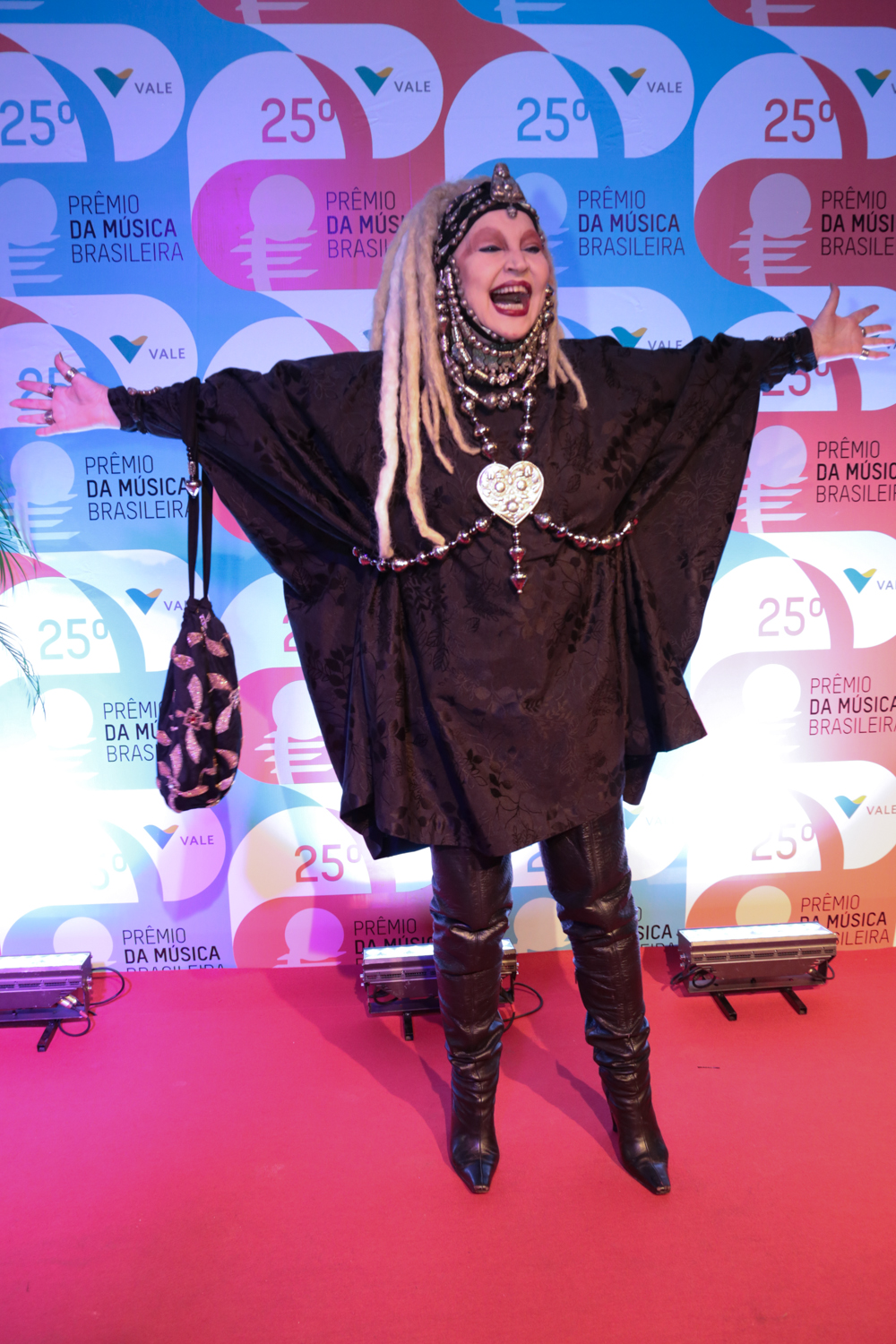
- Maravilha at the 25th Brazilian Music Award in 2015
- Born: Elke Grünupp; 22 February 1945; Leutkirch, Germany
- Died: 16 August 2016 (aged 71); Rio de Janeiro, Brazil
- Citizenship: Stateless (1945–1962, 1971–1996); Brazilian (1962–1971, revoked); German (1996–2016)
- Education: Federal University of Rio Grande do Sul
- Occupations: Actress, model, television personality
- Years active: 1969–2016
- Height: 1.77 m (5 ft 10 in)

Elke Maravilha (née Grünupp; 22 February 1945 – 16 August 2016) was a German-Brazilian actress, model and television personality. She lived in Brazil from her early childhood until her death.

== Biography ==
Maravilha was born to a Latvian father and German mother in Leutkirch, although throughout her career she stated she was born in Leningrad, Russia. At the age of four, her family emigrated to Brazil in 1949 and first settled at a farm in Itabira in the state of Minas Gerais. In 1955, her family leased lands in Atibaia in São Paulo State, running a strawberry farm. The family then went to Bragança Paulista to farm. Returning to Minas Gerais, she was chosen as "Glamour Girl" in Belo Horizonte in 1962. It was during this period that she became a naturalized Brazilian.

At the age of 20, Maravilha left home to live in Rio de Janeiro, working as a bilingual secretary, using her fluency in eight languages, many of them learned in her own home environment, as a teacher of French and English. Her father became director of Liquigás corporation and was transferred to Porto Alegre. She returned to live with her family in Porto Alegre between 1966 and 1969, where she attended courses at the Federal University of Rio Grande do Sul faculties of philosophy, medicine and letters and trained as a translator and interpreter of foreign languages.

She took up modeling work at age 24, in 1969, in the same period in which she married a Greek writer, Alexandros Evremidis, the first of her eight marriages. At 20, she met Evremidis on a ship en route to Europe in 1965 on her way to live with her maternal grandmother in Germany. During this time, she began a friendship with the fashion designer Zuzu Angel.

During the Brazilian military dictatorship in 1972, Maravilha was arrested for contempt at Santos Dumont Airport in Rio de Janeiro for tearing up posters of Stuart Angel Jones, her friend Zuzu's son, claiming that he had already been killed by the regime. She was arrested under the National Security Law and lost her Brazilian citizenship, although there is no record of her loss of Brazilian citizenship. Her Brazilian ID card stating she was "Brazilian by option" was expired in 1970 at the time she was arrested in 1972, so she never renewed it. She was released after six days, following the appeals of artist friends. Years later, she successfully applied for German citizenship. She held a German passport sometime in the 90s. However, her Brazilian residence permit gave "stateless" as nationality.

== Film and TV portrayals ==
She was portrayed by Luana Piovani in the 2006 biographical drama film Zuzu Angel. Maravilha also made a special guest appearance in the film.

She was also portrayed by Gianne Albertoni in Chacrinha: O velho guerreiro, a 2018 film biography about Chacrinha.

In 2022, Maravilha was portrayed by Maidê Mahl in O Rei da TV, a biographical television series about Silvio Santos.

== Death ==
Maravilha died in Rio de Janeiro on 16 August 2016 of multiple organ failure, from complications of a surgery to treat an ulcer.

== Work ==
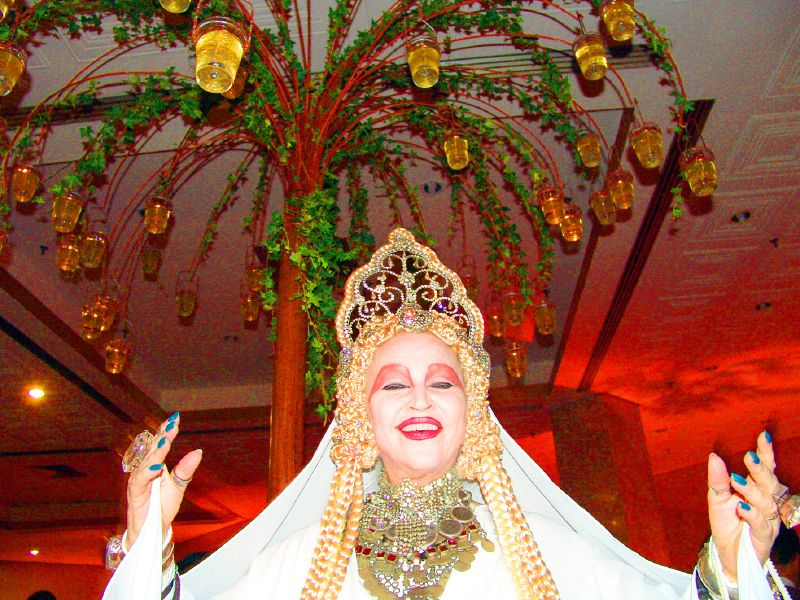
Maravilha in 2005

=== Television ===
Year	Title	Role	Notes
1973	A Volta de Beto Rockfeller	Sofia	
1979	Milagre – O Poder da Fé	Herself	Special participation
1979	Feijão Maravilha	Herself	Special participation
1986	Memórias de um Gigolô	Madame Yara	
1982–1988	Cassino do Chacrinha	Judge	
1988–1991	Show de Calouros	Judge	
1993–1996	Programa Elke Maravilha	Presenter	
1998	Pecado Capital	Herself	Special participation
2004	Big Brother Brasil 4	Judge	
2004	Celebridade	Herself	Special
2004	Da Cor do Pecado	Judge	Participação Especial
2007	Luz do Sol	Urânia Szakaly	
2009	Caminho das Índias	Herself	Special participation
2012	Morando Sozinho	Dona Violeta	
2013	As Canalhas	Cacala	
2013	Destino: Rio de Janeiro	Aunt Selesniova	
2015	Fantástico	Herself	Quadro: O Grande Plano

=== Film ===
Year	Title	Role
1970	Salário Mínimo	Modelo
1971	O Barão Otelo no Barato dos Bilhões	Secretária
1972	Os Machões	
1972	Quando o Carnaval Chegar	Atriz Francesa
1973	O Rei do Baralho	
1974	Gente que Transa	Esmeralda
1976	Xica	Hortência
1977	Tenda dos Milagres	
1977	A Força de Xangô	Iaba
1977	Pastores da Noite	
1978	Elke Maravilha Contra o Homem Atômico	Elke Maravilha
1979	A Noiva da Cidade	Daniela
1979	O Milagre	Elke
1981	Pixote	Débora
1987	No Rio vale tudo	Esposa
1987	Romance	Amiga de Antônio César
1987	Tanga (Deu no New York Times?)	
1988	Prisoner of Rio	Frank
1999	Xuxa Requebra	Iara Macedo "Macedão"
2006	Zuzu Angel	Lieselotte
2007	Elke	Herself
2007	Elke no país das Maravilhas	Herself
2010	A Suprema Felicidade	Avó de Paulo
2010	A Maravilha de ser Elke	Herself
2011	Fca Carla	Lúcia
2013	The Dognapper	Dona Noara
2013	Meu Passado Me Condena	Mirtes
2015	A Lenda do Gato Preto	Angelina
2015	Super Oldboy	Senhora
2016	Carrossel 2: O Sumiço da Maria Joaquina	Dona Lelé
2016	Lua em Sagitário	Ulla

=== Stage ===
- Paixão de Cristo
- Elke – do Sagrado ao Profano
- Viva o Cordão Encarnado
- O Castelo das Sete Torres
- Rio de Cabo a Rabo
- Eu Gosto de Mamãe
- Carlota Joaquina
- A Rainha Morta
- O Homem e o Cavalo
- Orfeu da Conceição
- O Lobo da Madrugada

=== Music ===
Maravilha recorded the song "Que vontade de comer goiaba", available in the compilation album Dançando em duplo sentido.
