= Biola Adebayo =

Nollywood actress and producer

- Born: 23 December; Lagos State
- Other name: bisibaby
- Citizenship: Nigeria
- Education: University of Lagos
- Occupations: Nollywood actress, Producer, TV Presenter
- Years active: 2002 - Present
- Spouse: Oluseyi

Abiola Ayomide Adebayo is a Nollywood actress and producer, known for starring in Jade's Cross, Tori Owo and other films. She co-hosted the 2nd edition of Bling Awards alongside Woli Agba in Ibadan themed "Take a Flight with Us". The actress created awareness together with Eniola Badmus and Banky W. during the COVID-19 pandemic by encouraging people to stay indoors and use sanitizers.

== Early life and education ==
Biola Adebayo was born on December 23, 1981. She hawked goods to make ends meet and faced challenges throughout her secondary school and university years. She earned a master's degree in Public Administration from the University of Lagos.

== Personal life ==
She married Oluwaseyi on April 7, 2021, and assured fans that she would manage her home despite any flaws and differences. On 3 June 2025, she confirmed separation from Oluwaseyi on her Instagram post wishing him happy birthday. She stated that they've been separated since April 2024 but decided to handle it maturely and agreed to co-parent their son.

== Awards ==
The Nollywood actress won the Best supporting actress BON award, 2020. She also won the face of Nollywood at the City people awards and Best supporting actress, DIYMA award, both in 2021.

== Filmography ==
- Tori oro
- Oko Rere (2023) as Teni
- Ran Mi Lowo (2023) as Adunni
- Bayeseri (2022) as Bunmi
- Unseen Trap (2022) as Folawe
- Atila (2021) as Dapo Wife
- Jankariwo (2021) as Ella
- Rugudu (2020) as Ife
- Burgled (2020)
- Wetin Women Want (2018) as Magdalene
- Wages (2015)
- False (2013)
- Ike Kefa (2008)
- Omo Abore (2008)
- Jade's cross
