= Wetin Women Want =

- Directed by: Abiodun Jimoh
- Produced by: Seun Oloketuyi
- Starring: Daniel K Daniel, Mercy Aigbe and Oge Okoye
- Release date: 9 February 2018 (Lagos)
- Country: Nigeria
- Language: English

Wetin Women Want also known as WWW is a 2018 Nigerian movie produced by Seun Oloketuyi and directed by Abiodun Jimoh. The movie that highlights what women want in marriage or relationship, starring Daniel K. Daniel, Mercy Aigbe and Oge Okoye.

== Plot ==
The movie revolves around the complicated and uncomplicated nature of women. In the film, Azu and his wife, Vero, turn their house upside down which open doors for the question, Wetin Women Want.

== Premiere ==
The movie was first premiered on February 4, 2018, in Lagos and it hits the cinema on February 9. The producer of the movie led the crew to Kwara State for premiering in honour of the then First Lady of Kwara State, Deaconess Omolewa Ahmed.

== Cast ==
- Daniel K. Daniel as Azu
- Katherine Obiang as Vero
- Oge Okoye as Adaora
- Mercy Aigbe as Diamond
- Adaora Ukoh as Fatima
- Anthony Monjaro as John
- Jumoke Odetola as Sola
- Dayo Abila as Suppy
- Biola Adebayo as Magdalene
- Deborah Adeleye as Assistant
- Eniola Ajao as Lota
- Henry Arnold as Douglas
- Regina Chukwu as Yeni
