= Patience Oghre Imobhio =

Nigerian actress

- Born: Nigeria
- Education: University of Jos
- Occupations: Filmmaker; actress
- Years active: 1995—Present
- Spouse: Osezua Stephen-Imobhio

Patience Oghre Imobhio is a Nigerian filmmaker and actress. A graduate of the University of Jos in Theatre Arts, she is best known for directing films such as Dominos, Spider and Household, and TV series such as Dear Mother and Everyday People. In 2015 Pulse magazine named her as one of "9 Nigerian female movie directors you should know" in the Nollywood film industry.

== Personal life ==
Imobhio studied Theatre Arts at University of Jos. She is married to Osezua Stephen-Imobhio.

== Career ==
Imobhio started off as an actress in 1995 but later decided that she was more interested in directing movies. After graduating from the University of Jos, she moved to Lagos and joined Zeb Ejiro's production company. She is best known for directing films such as Dominos, Spider, and Household, as well as TV series like Dear Mother and Everyday People.
