= J. T. Tom West =

Nigerian actor

- Born: J. T. Tom West; 19 December 1965; Rivers State, Nigeria
- Died: 28 September 2006 (aged 40)
- Occupations: Actor; Film director
- Years active: 1987–2006

J. T. Tom West (19 December 1965 – 28 September 2006) was a Nigerian Nollywood actor, known for Otondo, Laviva and Born 2 Suffer. He died on 28 September 2006 in Lagos, Nigeria.

== Early life ==
He was born in Port Harcourt, River State in 1965 and grew up in Lagos, Nigeria.

== Career ==
He rose to fame after acting in the blockbuster movie State Of Emergency directed by Teco Benson.

Tom West has acted in various blockbuster movies in Hollywood that include; Above the law, The Captor, Gang Paradise.

== Filmography ==
- Laviva (2007)
- Dangerous Return (2006)
- Fears (2006)
- Fears 2 (2006)
- Liberian Girl (2006) as George
- The Captor (2006) as Curtis
- The Captor 2 (2006)
- The Break Out 2 (2006)
- The Break Out (2005)
- State of Emergency 2 (2005)
- I Believe in You (2004)
- I Believe in You 2 (2004)
- Into Temptation (2004)
- Lake of Fire (2004) as Devil
- My Own Share (2004)
- My Own Share 2 (2004)
- Otondo (2004)
- Shattered Illusion (2004)
- Shattered Illusion 2 (2004)
- The Substitute (2003)
- Last Weekend (2003)
- Last Weekend 2 (2003)
- Moving Train (2003)
- Oyato (2003)
- Oyato 2 (2003)
- Born 2 Suffer (2002) as Alex / Lucky
- Gangster Paradise (2001)
- She Devil (2001) as Richard
- State of Emergency (2000)
- The Price (1999)
- Another Campus Tale (1997)
- Tears for Love (1995)
- Glamour Girls (1994)

== Death ==
J.T Tom West died on September 28, 2006, in a horrifying car accident in Lagos. His body was welcomed at the Integrated Cultural Centre on Thursday, October 26, 2006, by dignitaries including members of the Actors Guild of Nigeria (AGN), officials, friends, and family. The two-phase singing service that followed was the next activity. As J.T. Tom West was allegedly a devoted Christian, the first aspect was solely a Christian concern.
