= Tanga (film) =

1987 film directed by Henfil

Tanga (Deu no New York Times?)
- Directed by: Henfil
- Written by: Joffre Rodrigues, Henfil
- Starring: Rubens Corrêa; Elke Maravilha; Cristina Pereira; Henfil; Flávio Migliaccio
- Cinematography: Edgard Moura
- Music by: Wagner Tiso
- Release date: August 4, 1987
- Running time: 90 minutes
- Country: Brazil
- Language: Brazilian Portuguese

Tanga (Deu no New York Times?) is a 1987 Brazilian comedy film directed by the comic artist Henfil and written by him and Joffre Rodrigues.

== Synopsis ==
The setting is Tanga, a small miserable island with an illiteracy rate of 99%. The country is headed by Herr Walkyria Von Mariemblau (Rubens Corrêa). Each day, a copy of The New York Times is delivered to the dictator, the only such copy available on the island. After he reads each day's newspaper, he incinerates it to prevent it from falling into the hands of communist guerrillas, who covet the newspaper, sharing his belief that "knowledge is power." (Note: At one time the phrase "deu no New York Times" ("it was in The New York Times") was a colloquialism used in Brazil to mean that something was undoubtedly true.)

== Cast ==
- Rubens Corrêa as Herr Walkyria Von Mariemblau
- Elke Maravilha as Frau Regine de Regine
- Cristina Pereira as Liga da Mulher Ideal
- Henfil as Kubanin
- Flávio Migliaccio as Partido Comunista Tanganês

The cast also includes Chico Anysio, Ricardo Blat, Zózimo Bulbul, Haroldo Costa, Daniel Filho, Jaguar, Ken Kaneko, Procópio Mariano, Hélio Pellegrino, Alan Riding, Joffre Rodrigues, and Fausto Wolff.

== Awards ==
- Golden Sun for Best Film (Sol de Ouro de Melhor filme pelo Júri Popular) at the Rio Cine Festival

== See also ==
- List of Brazilian films of the 1980s
