= Regina Chukwu =

Nigerian film actress

- Born: 23 March 1980 (age 46)
- Citizenship: Nigeria
- Education: Lagos State Polytechnic
- Occupation: Film actress

Regina Chukwu (born 23 March 1980) is a Nigerian actor, film producer and director.

== Early life and education ==
Chukwu was born in Iyana Ipaja, Lagos, but she is from Enugu State, Nigeria. She attended Alimosho Primary and Grammar School before proceeding to Lagos State Polytechnic.

== Personal life ==
Chukwu married in her early 20s and has two children, a son and a daughter. Her husband died of tuberculosis three years into the marriage.

== Filmography ==
- Ogunso
- Idaro
- Akun
- Ewatomi
- Bridal Shower
- Encounter
- Two Mothers
- Family Ties
- Oju ogbe mileyi (2009) as Adedoja
- Ifedolapo (2015) as Nurse Nkechi
- Couple's Award (2017) as Lizzy
- Agbede Meji (2017)
- Wetin Women Want (2018) as Yeni
- Alase (2020)
- Battle on Buka Street (2022) as Charity

== Awards and nominations ==
Year	Award	Category	Result	Ref
2011	Best of Nollywood Awards	Best Actress in a Supporting Role	Nominated	
2013	African Magic Viewers'Choice Awards	Best Supporting Actress in a Drama	Nominated	
2019	Best of Nollywood Awards	Best Supporting Actress (Yoruba)	Won	
2020	Best of Nollywood Awards	Best Supporting Actress (Yoruba)	Nominated	
