= Fugitive (2019 film) =

Film

- Directed by: Andy Boyo
- Produced by: Andy Boyo
- Starring: Daniel K. Daniel; Kate Henshaw
- Release date: 2019
- Country: Nigeria

Fugitive is a 2019 Nigerian film. It was directed and produced by Andy Boyo. Fugitive was centered around a cop who is accused of killing an investigative journalist.

== Plot ==
The film takes place in a fictional United States of Africa, where various African nations have merged into one country. A detective is accused of killing an investigative journalist and pursued by police and a syndicate. The film also highlights the negative effects of xenophobia and explores the theme of corruption.

== Cast ==
The cast of the film includes Kate Henshaw, Daniel K. Daniel, Keppy Ekpenyong, Frederick Leonard, as well as actors from Zambia and Rwanda.
