= Vuga =

Vuga The First African Hero
- Directed by: Simi Opeodu
- Screenplay by: Emeka Obiakonwa
- Story by: Raphael Nelson
- Produced by: Uzodinma Okpechi
- Starring: Regina Askia; Segun Arinze; Gentle Jack; Ramsey Nouah; Chiwetalu Agu
- Cinematography: Ngozi Nkebakwu
- Edited by: Simi Opeodu
- Music by: House of Macro; OGD Pictures
- Production company: Macro Productions
- Distributed by: Infinity Film Incorporation
- Release date: 2000
- Country: Nigeria
- Language: English

Vuga is a 2000 Nigerian adventure film directed by Simi Opeodu. It tells the story of a strong man who uses his strength and ability to save his village from terror. In August 2018, the main character in the film, "Vuga", was listed as one of the ten best Nigerian film characters of the 90s and 2000s.

== Cast ==
- Gentle Jack as Vuga
- Regina Askia
- Segun Arinze
- Ramsey Nouah
- Tony Aleg
- Lanre Balogan
- Chiwetalu Agu
- Larry Koldsweat
- John Okafor (uncredited)

== Production ==
John Okafor, who also worked as the production manager for the film, cast Jim Iyke in the film for about 11 scenes in an uncredited role.
