= Ayo Akinwale =

Nigerian actor, producer, and academician (1946–2020)

- Born: Ayobami Akinwale; 1946; Ibadan, Southern Region, British Nigeria (now in Oyo State, Nigeria)
- Died: 13 September 2020 (aged 73–74); Ibadan, Oyo State, Nigeria
- Education: Methodist High School; University of Ibadan
- Occupations: film actor, producer, academic
- Known for: Sango
- Awards: Best Indigenous actor award

Ayobami Akinwale (1946 – 13 September 2020) was a Nigerian actor, producer, and academic.

== Early life and career ==
He was born in Ibadan and attended Methodist High School and the University of Ibadan before commencing academic work as a lecturer at the Polytechnic Ibadan. He was the Dean, of the Faculty of Arts and Culture of University of Ilorin. He was also the chairman of Oyo State Council for Arts and Culture. He has been a judge at several cultural festivals across Nigeria. He began his acting career in the 1970s featuring in television and drama productions. He won the Best Indigenous actor award at the 4th Africa Movie Academy Awards.

== Death ==
He died due to a brief illness in the University of Ilorin Teaching Hospital at the age of 74.

== Selected filmography ==
- Sango (1997)
- Afonja (2002) as Basorun
- Ladepo Omo Adanwo (2005) as King
- Iranse Aje (2007)
- Atanpako otun (2007) as Chief Judge Tribunal
- Eti Keta (2011) as Lubcon Chairman
- The Bridge (2017) as Oba Adeyemi
- Diamonds In The Sky (2019) as Dr. Abdulabi
