= Eddie Ugbomah =

Nigerian film director and producer (1940–2019)

- Born: 19 December 1940
- Died: 11 May 2019 (aged 78)
- Citizenship: Nigerian
- Occupation: Film director And producer
- Notable work: America or Die (1996)

Eddie Ugbomah (19 December 1940 – 11 May 2019) was a Nigerian film director and producer. He directed and produced films such as The Rise and Fall of Oyenusi in 1979, The Boy is Good, and Apalara, a film about the life and murder of Alfa Apalara in Oko Awo, Lagos. The plots of some of his films are loosely based on real-life events. The Rise and Fall of Oyenusi is based on the career of a notorious robber. Ishola Oyenusi.

== Life and career ==
Ugbomah was a native of the Village Ashaka area Aboh in the East Ndokwa Local Government Area of Delta State, south-south Nigeria but grew up in the Obalende and Lafiaji area of Lagos State, southwestern Nigeria. He was educated at St. Matthias, Lafiaji, Lagos, and City College School. He traveled to London for his college education and attended various colleges studying journalism, drama, and later film. After his studies, he worked with BBC and also played minor roles in Dr.No, Guns at Batasi and Sharpeville Massacre. He was a member of an Afro-Caribbean drama group and directed some of the group's plays, such as This is Our Chance, a play staged at the Stoke Newington Theatre Hall. He returned to Nigeria in 1975 and was involved in concert promotion before starting Edifosa, a film production company.

Ugbomah's films usually tackle contemporary social and political issues. In 1979, he produced Dr Oyenusi, the film's plot, taken from the headlines, is about a notorious robber, Ishola Oyenusi, who terrorized Lagosians in the early 1970s.The film also delved into the menace of armed robbery in Nigeria. Oyenusi featured Ugbomah as the lead actor. Ugbomah's next film, the Mask, was released in 1979. The film's material is based on the history of Nigeria during the Benin Expedition of 1897 and the looting of artifacts from the Benin palace. In the Mask, the protagonist, Obi, played by Ugbomah, tries to secretly steal the Benin ivory mask and return it to Nigeria. Some critics likened the character of Obi to the MI6 agent James Bond. Ugbomah's career flourished into the early 1980s, producing such films as Oil Doom, Bolus '80 and The Boy is Good. Most of his films were shot in 16mm with the exception of The Mask. Later in his career Ugbomah turned to Yoruba video films.

In 1988, he was appointed chairman of the Nigerian Film Corporation

He died on 11 May 2019, at the age of 78.

== Filmography ==
- Blood in the Lagoon (2015) as Douglas Bello
- War Front (2004) as Brigadier General Castro
- America or Die (1996)
- Toriade (1989)
- The Great Attempt (1988)
- Omiran (1986)
- Apalara (1986)
- Esan (1985)
- Death of a Black President (1984)
- Vengeance of the Cult (1984)
- The Boy is Good (1978)
- Bolus '80 (1982)
- Oil Doom (1980)
- The Mask (1979)
- Rise and Fall of Oyenusi (1977)

== See also ==
- List of Nigerian film producers

== Sources ==
- Ukadike, Nwachukwu (1989). Black African cinema (Thesis). New York University.
