= Rattlesnake (1995 film) =

- Directed by: Amaka Igwe
- Written by: Amaka Igwe
- Screenplay by: Amaka Igwe
- Starring: Francis Duru; Nkem Owoh; Sunny McDon; Ebele Uzochukwu; Anne Njemanze
- Release date: 1995
- Country: Nigeria
- Language: Igbo Language

Rattlesnake is a 1995 Nigerian action film written and directed by Amaka Igwe and produced by Austin Awulonu. It was Igwe's first feature-length film and was released in three parts. The film stars Francis Duru, Okechukwu Igwe, Nkem Owoh, Anne Njemanze and Ernest Obi.

== Synopsis ==
Rattlesnake tells the story of Ahanna Okolo, who loses his father under suspicious circumstances as a child and ventures into a life of crime. Following the death of his father, Ahanna's uncle becomes his stepfather as he marries his mother. Ahanna's uncle sends Ahanna and his siblings to the village while he takes over Ahanna's father's property in Lagos. Ahanna ventures into crime and fends for his siblings with the proceeds of his criminal dealings. He goes on to lead a double life, posing as a respectable businessman and also as an armed robber, secretly. He, however, turns a new leaf when his crimes are exposed.

== Cast ==
- Francis Duru as young Ahanna Okolo
- Nkem Owoh as Odinaka, Ahanna's uncle
- Sunny McDon as Ahanna's father
- Ebele Uzochukwu as Ahanna's mother
- Chebe Azih as Chukwuemeka, Ahanna's brother
- Anne Njemanze as Amara (part 1 and 2)
- Okechukwu Igwe as older Ahanna Okolo
- Byron Ene as Egbe
- Chris Iheuwa as Bala
- Ernest Obi as Sango
- Julius Agwu as young Peter
- Ejike Methuselah as older Peter
- Remy Ohajianya as Peter's father
- Bob-Manuel Udokwu as Maduako Olisa Jnr
- Uche Odoputa
- Okey Okoronkwo
- Tony One Week
- Stella Damasus as Amara
- Genevieve Nnaji
- Chris Okotie

== Production and release ==
Rattlesnake has been described as one of the earliest Nollywood action films. It was listed among the 100 greatest foreign-language films.

The Last Operation was released as a sequel to Rattlesnake.

== Remake ==
Charles Okpaleke of Play Networks Africa obtained the rights to Rattlesnake and released Rattlesnake: The Ahanna Story in November 2020. In a review by Precious Nwogu of Pulse Nigeria, the remake was said to "pale in comparison to the original in terms of the depth of the original's plot and themes". Stan Nze's performance in the lead role received critical acclaim.
