= Steve Eboh =

Nollywood actor

- Born: Steve Eboh; Nigeria
- Other name: Ajebo
- Education: University of Lagos
- Occupations: Actor, producer, television personality, philanthropist
- Years active: 1993–present

Steve Eboh //, popularly known as Ajebo, is a Nigerian actor. He is best known for his roles in the films Extreme Measure, Extreme Measure 2 and Lionheart. Apart from acting, Eboh is also a producer, television personality and a philanthropist.

== Personal life ==
He is an indigene of Achi in Oji River LGA of Enugu State. He graduated with a mass communication degree from the University of Lagos.

== Career ==
In 1993, he made his acting debut with the home movie Taboo and its sequel Taboo 2. Since then, he continued to dominate in many local home movies. He has acted in several popular Nollywood films such as Ikuku, Blood Money: The Vulture Men, Karishika and its sequel Karishika 2, Narrow Escape, Evil Passion, and The Concubines. In 2018, he appeared in the home movie Lionheart in a supportive role.

In June 2019, Eboh was announced as the brand ambassador of a Nigerian oil servicing and marketing company called 'GOVOIL'. Additionally, he worked as the Vice President of the Actors Guild of Nigeria (AGN), and Chairperson of the National Caretaker Committee, AGN. He was also the CEO of Confirm Projects International Ltd. for a brief period.

== Partial filmography ==
Year	Film	Role	Genre	Ref.
1998	Karashika	Car Driver	Horror	
1999	Issakaba	Elder	Action / Drama / Horror	
2003	Oga and His Boys	Usman	Drama	
2005	Days of Bondage	Lover Boy	Drama	
2008	Kiss My Pain	Chief Obika	Home movie	
2008	Kiss My Pain 2	Chief Obika	Home movie	
2009	Honest Deceiver	Senator	Home movie	
2009	Honest Deceiver 2	Senator	Home movie	
2011	Thanks for Coming	Benson	Home movie	
2011	Thanks for Coming 2	Benson	Home movie	
2011	Royal King		Home movie	
2011	Royal King 2		Home movie	
2011	Gallant Babes	Benson	Home movie	
2011	Gallant Babes 2	Benson	Home movie	
2018	Lionheart	Ministry of Transport Director No. 1	Home movie	
