= Victoria Inyama =

Nigerian actress

- Born: Enugu State, Nigeria
- Citizenship: Nigeria
- Education: University of Lagos
- Occupation: Actress
- Years active: 1990–present
- Spouse: Godwin Okri
- Children: 3

Victoria Inyama// is a Nigerian actress known for her roles in Nollywood films and television productions during the 1990s and early 2000s. She later relocated to the United Kingdom where she pursued further education and family life.

== Early life and education ==
Inyama was born in Enugu State, which is the south-eastern part of Nigeria predominantly occupied by the Igbo speaking people of Nigeria. She obtained her first B.Sc from the University of Lagos. She spoke on Channels TV where she stated during an interview, that she currently is in school studying counseling in the Lewisham Counseling school of London to be able to aid people mentally. She has also attended the Greenwich school of management located in London.

== Career ==
In 1990, she started her career. She claimed in an interview that actor Alex Usifo first saw her and helped introduce her to the Nigerian film business. Inyama, after marrying Godwin Okri, relocated to the United Kingdom and this action was detrimental to her acting career as she left the entertainment business and focused on her family.

== Personal life ==
Inyama was married to Godwin Okri and they have three children together.

Through her social media platform, Inyama revealed her battle with cancer in 2006.

== Filmography ==
- Silent Night (1996) as Julie
- My Cross (1998) as Isabella
- Orange Girl"
- Holy Crime (1999) as Erica
- Mother's Cry (2001)
- Danger Zone
- Odum
- "Public Lady"
- Love from Above (2004)
- Eze Nwanyi
- Glamour Boys
- Iyanga (2003)
- Barraccuda
- Housemates (2012) as Bimbo
- Talking Dolls (2017)
- Golden Stripes (2023) as Evelyn Williams
