= Alfa Apalara =

Nigerian Muslim cleric

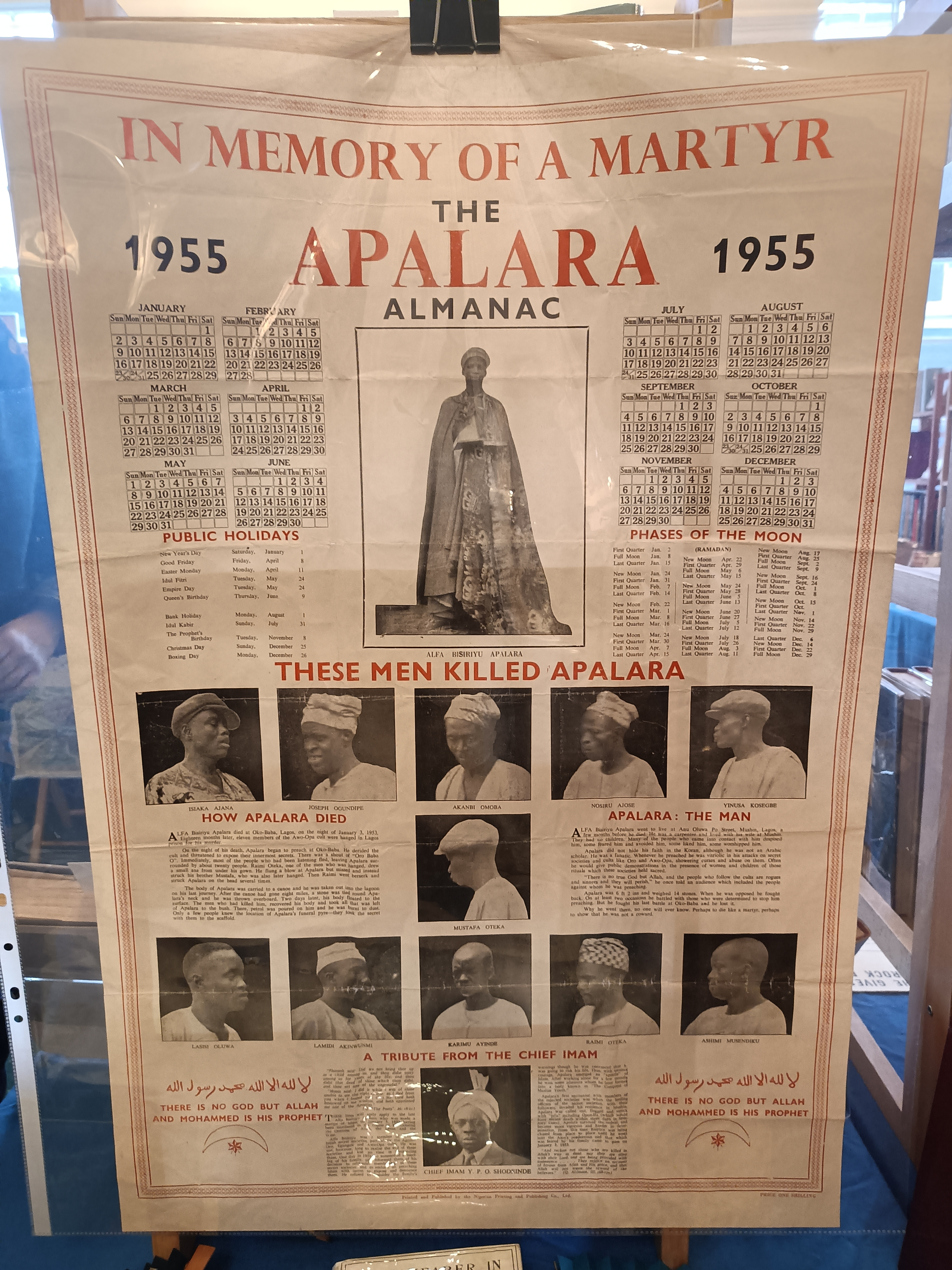
A 1955 Nigerian almanac commemorating Apalara as a "marytr".

Alfa Bisiriyu Apalara (1918–1953) was a Yoruba Nigerian Muslim cleric from Lagos.

In the early 1950s, he held a series of crusades and Dawah in Ebute Metta and Mushin with a common theme of speaking out against traditional Yoruba cults such as Oro and Egungun and drawing more adherents of traditional African religion to Islam. He was murdered on January 3, 1953 and his body was never found.

== Life ==
Apalara was born in Itoko, a town in the outskirts of Abeokuta, he had Quranic studies and elementary education before he went to Lagos to work as a carpenter. In Lagos, he lived in Mushin, a settlement that had a reputation as the home of street urchins. While living in Mushin, Apalara was involved in the negative aspects of life in neighborhood. In 1945, he was imprisoned on the charges of theft. By 1950, Apalara had gone through a transformation, he started praying regularly and fasting. He turned his back on his past and also divorced his wife so as to remove anything related to his past in Mushin.

In 1950, Apalara launched a crusade. The crusades were usually held in Ebute Metta and Mushin, usually on a street or at an intersection of two or three streets. Apalara was an articulate preacher and soon had a large following, majority of whom were women. His preachings focused on condemning unrighteous acts, lukewarm Muslims and traditional cults. He earned respect from some in the Muslim community and he was turbaned as the foremost preacher of a mosque in mainland Muslims. He was also vicious in his preachings against the traditional cults.

In 1951, he started having conflicts with the local cults and masquerades in Mushin, during one of his open air sermons, a cult and its masquerade on their way to perform traditional rites attempted to pass through one of his crusades however they were blocked by Apalara's congregation at the insistence of Apalara. The standoff lasted a few minutes and the cult and the masquerade retreated. In 1952, a similar situation occurred which led to a brawl between a masquerade group and Apalara's supporters. Thereafter, he received constant threats to his life.

== Death ==
In January 1953, Apalara was invited to come and preach in Oko Baba, a neighborhood in Ebute Metta and a stronghold of cultists. Apalara took the threats to his life seriously and paid for the services of a policeman for his crusade in Oko Baba. On January 3, 1953 during his sermon in Oko Baba, Apalara was abducted by a group of cultists, the policeman and most of his congregation ran away. He was struck by an object and was initially dragged into a nearby house. The dragging of Apalara's body to the house was the last time Apalara was seen by someone not connected to his murder.

In October, 1953, a jury delivered a verdict of death by hanging to 11 people who were found culpable in the murder.

== Sources ==
- Aderinto, Saheed; Osifodunrin, Paul (2012). Third Wave of Historical Scholarship on Nigeria : Essays in Honor of Ayodeji Olukoju. Newcastle upon Tyne, GBR: Cambridge Scholars Publishing.
- Adeniran, Kabir (2012). Martyrdom of muslim clerics and its effects on da'wah (islamic proselytization) in Lagos state (PDF) (Report). Olabisi Onabanjo.
