= Black Goddess =

1978 film

- Directed by: Ola Balogun
- Written by: Ola Balogun
- Produced by: Ola Balogun; Jece Valadao
- Starring: Jorge Coutinho; Sonia Santos; Zózimo Bulbul; Léa Garcia; Roberto Pirillo
- Cinematography: Edison Batista
- Edited by: Philipe Gosselet
- Music by: Remi Kabaka
- Production company: Magnus Filmes
- Distributed by: Embrafilme; Afrocult Foundation
- Release date: 1978
- Running time: 95 minutes
- Countries: Nigeria; Brazil
- Language: Portuguese

Black Goddess (Portuguese: A Deusa Negra) is a 1978 Nigerian-Brazilian film written and directed by Ola Balogun. It stars a largely Brazilian cast that includes Sonya Santos, Zózimo Bulbul, Léa Garcia, and Jorge Coutinho. The film is set in both the eighteenth century and the 1970s.

== Plot ==
The protagonist of the movie is Babatunde, played by Zozimo Bulbul. The dying wish of Babatunde's father was for Babatunde to make a journey to Brazil and see what has become of the descendants of his great-grandfather, Oluyole, who was abducted and sold into slavery and also search for the story of a mysterious legend in the family's history. He is handed a Yemoja sculpture as a guide for the journey that took him from Lagos to favelas in Brazil and a visit to a candomblé session. The movie's plot used African spiritual embodiment existing as a reality. Babatunde is transported back to the period of his grandfather's time in Brazil with the help of Yemoja.

== Cast ==
- Jorge Coutinho as Oluyole
- Sonia Santos as Amanda, Elisa
- Zózimo Bulbul as Babatunde
- Léa Garcia as Yemoja
- Antônio Pitanga

== Production ==
Black Goddess is the first Nigerian-Brazilian co-production. The film was co-produced by EMBRAFILME and Balogun's Afrocult Foundation. The scenes were shot in Brazil, and the language is Portuguese.

== Reception ==
Two critics, Janet Maslin and Kathe Sandler, described the film as a melodrama Maslin described the movie as having two films, a historical melodrama in the tradition of Roots and a "fiery and forceful tribute to contemporary African culture".

The movie won an award at the 1980 Carthage Film Festival.
