= Sango (film) =

1997 epic Nigerian film

Sango: The Legendary African King
- Directed by: Obafemi Lasode
- Written by: Wale Ogunyemi
- Produced by: Obafemi Lasode
- Starring: Peter Fatomilola; Racheal Oniga; Antar Laniyan; Obafemi Lasode; Wale Adebayo; Bukky Ogunnote; Gbenga Richards; Ayo Akinwale; Joe Layode; Kola oyewo Jimi Sholanke; Kola Oyewo; Kayode Odumosun
- Cinematography: Yusuf Mohammed
- Edited by: Jimi Solanke
- Music by: Jumoke Oke
- Production company: Afrika'n Vogue/Even-Ezra Studios
- Release date: 1 October 1997
- Running time: 160 minutes
- Country: Nigeria
- Languages: English; Yoruba; Hausa

Sango: The Legendary African King is a 1997 epic Nigerian film, written by Wale Ogunyemi, produced and directed by Obafemi Lasode. The film depicts the life and reign of the legendary fifteenth-century African king Sango, who ruled as the Alaafin of Oyo and became an important deity of the Yoruba people.

== Cast ==
- Wale Adebayo as Sango
- Peter Fatomilola as Babalawo Oyo (Oyo priest)
- Racheal Oniga as Obba
- Joe Layode as Elempe
- Bukky Ogunnote as Ọṣun
- Gbenga Richards as Samu
- Laide Adewale as Agbaakin
- Professor Ayo Akinwale as Bashorun
- Antar Laniyan as Olowu
- Ola Tehinse as Balogun
- Jimi Solanke as Ghost
- Albert Aka-eze as Eliri
- Toyin Oshinaike as Oluode
- Peter Fatomilola as Babalawo Oyo
- Wale Ogunyemi as Lagunan
- Kola Oyewo as High Chief
- Kayode Odumosu as Tamodu
- Doyin Hassan as Omiran
- Mufu Hamzat as Biri
- Jumoke Oke-eze as Chantress
- Florence Richards as Otun Iyalode and *Remi Abiola as Iyalode

== Screening ==
In 1998, the film was screened by the Film Society of Lincoln Center, New York City, U.S.A. as part of the 4th New York African Film Festival. In February 1999, the film was screened at the 7th Pan African Film Festival in Los Angeles. In April 2002, the film was selected to open the Minneapolis–Saint Paul International Film Festival.

== Awards ==
- Best Feature Film at the 1st Abuja International Film Festival, held in Abuja, Nigeria, in October, 2004
- Best First Film of a Director at the Nigerian Film Festival held in Lagos, November, 2003.
