= Orun Mooru =

1982 film by Ola Balogun

- Directed by: Ola Balogun
- Written by: Moses Olaiya
- Produced by: Moses Olaiya
- Starring: Moses Olaiya
- Cinematography: Tunde Kelani
- Production company: Alawada Movies ltd.
- Release date: 1982
- Country: Nigeria
- Language: Yoruba
- Budget: ₦1,500,000

Orun Mooru (transl. Heaven is Hot) is a 1982 Nigerian comedy film directed by Ola Balogun and produced by Moses Olaiya (Baba Sala). The film narrates the story of a once successful businessman who was tricked by a herbalist into a failed get-rich-quick scheme and then decides to commit suicide.

== Plot ==
Orun Mooru narrates the story of Karounwi (Moses Olaiya), a basketmaker who lives in a fishing village. Flashback shows that he used to be a thriving businessman until he was tricked by a Babalawo (herbalist) into believing that he could fill oil drums with money.

Karounwi receives a loan of ₦500 from a friend. He loses all the money; half to a pickpocket, and the other half when his wife exchanged the drums he saved the money in for new plates. This turn of events led him into committing suicide and finding himself in the underworld.

Iku (means: Death) tells him that he isn't ready for his coming. Karounwi then ascends to meet the Ayo (means: Joy), who then sends him off with two magical eggs and two of her disciples to escort him back to earth.

Upon reaching earth in a lavish mansion, Karounwi has sex with the two disciples from the underworld, then breaks one of the eggs, which transforms into a huge pile of money. He goes ahead to break the second egg, despite the standing instruction not to do so. Upon doing so, Death appears.

Karounwi is seen coming into his shack in the fishing village. A flashback shows that he has been fished out of the water from under the bridge he had thrown himself to commit suicide.

== Cast ==
- Moses Olaiya as Lamidi
- King Sunny Ade as himself (cameo)
- Ola Balogun

== Production ==
The film was originally shot on 35 mm film but was reduced to 16 mm film for distribution and exhibition.

The underworld scenes of the film were shot at the Osun Grove, Osogbo.

== Reception ==
Orun Mooru went on to be a very successful film, but its success was cut short when it was pirated and bootlegged before it concluded its theatre run.

=== Critical reception ===
Kenneth W. Harrow states: "The themes of over-reaching greed and wild swings from the village life from the lavish property and back again are close to the heart of the Nigerian national experience during the oil boom years [...] Propelled by his moral wills, Baba Sala bounces among four sharply opposing realms".

== Piracy ==
Not long after the theatrical release of Orun Mooru, it got pirated and bootlegged following the theft of the film's master celluloid tape. The piracy happened before the end of the theatrical run of the film; several cinemas in different cities across the country screened the film without being licensed to do so, and remuneration never reached the producers. The loss incurred as a result of this piracy significantly affected the career of Moses Olaiya in the film industry, as well as his personal life. The piracy of Orun Mooru has been reported as the first major incidence of piracy in the Nigerian film industry.
