= Lilian Bach =

Nigerian actress

Lilian Bola Bach
- Born: 9 November 1970 (age 55); Lagos Island, Nigeria
- Education: Theatre arts, University of Lagos
- Occupations: Actress, former model
- Years active: 1997-2013
- Spouse: Mr Alaka

Lilian Bola Bach is a Nigerian actress and model.

== Early life and education ==
Lilian was born in Lagos Island to a Yoruba mother and a Polish father. As a result of her father's profession, she lived in various parts of the country during her formative years, attending Army Children's school, Port Harcourt, Rivers State and Idi Araba Secondary School, Lagos. She briefly majored in theatre arts at the University of Lagos She lost her father at the age of ten.

== Modelling and acting career ==
Lilian came into the limelight in the 1990s as a model. She also competed in the Most Beautiful Girl in Nigeria pageant and featured in several television commercials, becoming the face of Delta medicated soap. She commenced her acting career in 1997, starring in several Nollywood movies of the Yoruba and English genres.

== Personal life ==
Lilian married a business mogul, Mr. Alaka, in 2012. She is a Pentecostal Christian.

== Selected filmography ==
| Year | Title | Role |
|---|---|---|
| 2011 | Eletan | |
| 2010 | High Blood Pressure | |
| 2008 | Eja Osan | |
| 2006 | Angels of Destiny | |
| 2006 | The Search | |
| 2005 | Joshua | |
| 2005 | Mi ose kogba | |
| 2004 | A Second Time | |
| 2004 | Big Pretenders | Pamela |
| 2004 | Douglas My Love | Erica |
| 2004 | Ready to Die | |
| 2004 | London Forever | Regina |
| 2004 | Broken Edge | |
| 2004 | Lost Paradise | |
| 2004 | Ogidan | |
| 2004 | The Cartel | |
| 2004 | True Romance | Angy |
| 2003 | Market Sellers | |
| 2003 | Not Man enough | |
| 2001 | Outkast | |
| 2001 | Grace to Grass | Lovina |
| 2001 | Married to a Witch | Alice |
| | High Street Girls | |
