= Becky Okorie =

Nigerian actress

- Born: Becky Ngozi Okorie
- Occupation: Actress

Becky Ngozi Okorie is a Nigerian actress. She is chiefly known as the titular character in the 1998 horror movie Karishika.
