= Gentle Jack =

Nigerian actor

- Born: 1970 (age 55–56)
- Occupation: Actor
- Notable work: Vuga

Gentle Jack (born 1970) is a Nigerian actor who has featured in many movies, contributing to the growth and development of the Nigerian movie industry. He played the title character in the film Vuga, listed in August 2018 as one of the ten most memorable Nigerian film characters of the 90s and 2000s by the magazine Pulse.

Gentle Jack has lived in Lagos for most of his life. In September 2018, he relocated to Port Harcourt.

== Filmography ==
- Jane Rambo Daughter of the Jungle (2018) as Captain Shegun
- Hitler (2007) as Jack
- The Ghost (2005) as Bob
- Vuga (2000) as Vuga
- Blood Money (1997) as Bodyguard
