= Anne Njemanze =

Nigerian actress

- Born: Anne Njemanze; Nigeria
- Occupation: Nollywood Actress
- Years active: 1995–present
- Spouse(s): Segun Arinze; Silver Ojieson
- Children: Renny Morenike Njemanze

Anne Njemanze, is an actress in Nigerian cinema. She is most notable for the roles in the films Domitila, Tinsel, Ìrètí, and Colourless.

== Personal life ==
She was married to fellow Nollywood actor Segun Arinze, which later became a short-lived marriage. The couple has one daughter, Renny Morenike, who was born on 10 May.

In November 2013, she remarried Silver Ojieson. However, it also lasted less than eight months till July 2014 due to issues relating to bouts of domestic violence, abuse, and battery.

Shortly after the divorce from her first marriage, she met with an accident in Calabar, Cross River State. Due to the accident, the Imo state-born actress from Owerri was terribly damaged. Nevertheless, Njemanze remained on crutches for 2 years.

== Career ==
In 1994, Njemanze appeared as Ritchie Haatrope's spoilt girlfriend, Temi Badmus, in Checkmate and played Amara, Ahanna's girlfriend, in the 1995 movie Rattlesnake. Her breakthrough role was as the title character in Domitilla and later the sequel, Domitilla II. Later she acted in the film True Confession alongside Liz Benson.

In 2012, she played Inspector Sankey in the blockbuster hit M-Net series Tinsel.

== Filmography ==
Year	Film	Role	Genre	Ref.
1991	Checkmate	Temi Badmus		
1995	Rattle Snake	Amara	Drama	
1995	Rattle Snake 2	Amara	Drama	
1996	Domitila	Domitilla	Action / Thriller	
1996	Domitilla II	Domitilla	Action / Thriller	
1997	True Confession		Home Video	
2004	Living Abroad	Herself	Drama	
2004	Best Lovers		Drama	
2012	Tinsel	Inspector Sankey	Drama	
2015	Hope	Ireti	Short film	
2016	Ìrètí	Ireti	Short film	
2016	Colourless	Mrs. Grace Okai	Drama	
2018	The Lost Café	Ose's Mother	Drama	
