= Saint Obi =

Nigerian actor (1965–2023)

Obinna Nwafor
- Born: 16 November 1965; Port Harcourt, Nigeria
- Died: 7 May 2023 (aged 57); Jos (undisclosed)
- Education: University of Jos
- Years active: 1996—2023
- Known for: Candle Light; Take me to Maama; Sakobi; Goodbye Tomorrow; Heart of Gold; Festival of Fire; Executive Crime; Last Party; State of Emergency
- Spouse: Linda Nwafor

Obinna Nwafor ( 16 November 1965 – 7 May 2023), better known by his stage name Saint Obi, was a Nigerian actor, film producer and director.

== Education ==
Obi was born on 16 November 1965. He earned his Bachelor of Science in theatre arts at the University of Jos.

== Career ==
His first acting job was in 1996 via a Peugeot television commercial. He would later star in over 60 movies. In 2002, Obi produced his first movie, Take Me to Maama, where he starred as Jerry, alongside Ebi Sam, Rachel Oniga, Nse Abel and Enebeli Elebuwa. He was popular for roles in Candle Light, Goodbye Tomorrow, Heart of Gold, and other films. He is the founder and CEO of Agwhyte International limited, a production, talent and brand management firm based in Nigeria and the United States.

== Personal life ==
Obi was married to Lydia Saint Nwafor. She is an MTN top staff from Anambra State. They have three children together. Their marriage ended in 2021 after 15 years.

== Awards ==
- Best Actor in Africa at the Africa Magic Viewers Choice Awards.
- Most Prominent Actor in Nigeria at the City People Entertainment Awards.
- Best Actor in a Leading Role at the Nollywood movie awards.

== Death ==
Obi died on 7 May 2023 at the age of 57, in a sibling's house. He had battled a protracted illness.

== Selected filmography ==
Obi is known for his roles in:

- Domitilla (1996) as Harrison
- Candle Light (1998)
- Dirty Game (1998)
- Heartless (1998) as Marshal
- Enemies (1998) as Elvis
- Sakobi: The Snake Girl (1998) as Frank Davies
- Oracle (1998)
- Deadly Proposal (1998)
- Narrow Escape (1999) as Emmanuel 3
- Festival of Fire (1999)
- Eye for Eye (1999)
- State of Emergency (2000) as Smith
- Executive Crime (2000) as Christopher
- Final Whistle (2000) as Richard
- Jungle Justice (2000) as Alfred
- Take me to Maama (2002)
- More Than a Woman (2004) as Daniel
- Sensational Spy (2004) as Craig
- Golden Moon (2005) as Amadi
- Royal Palace (2005)
- Breath Again (2006) as Joe
- Crime Planner (2006) as Onuwa
- Greatest Weapon (2006) as Ejike
- Crying Angel

== See also ==
- List of Nigerian film producers
