= Moses Olaiya =

Nigerian comedian, dramatist and actor (1936–2018)

- Born: Moses Olaiya Adejumo; 18 May 1936; Ilesha, Southern Region, British Nigeria (now in Osun State, Nigeria)
- Died: 7 October 2018 (aged 82); Ilesha, Osun State, Nigeria
- Other name: Baba Sala
- Occupation: Actor
- Children: Emmanuel Adejumo, Mayowa Adejumo

Moses Olaiya (18 May 1936 – 7 October 2018), better known by his stage name "Baba Sala", was a Nigerian comedian, dramatist, and actor.

A Yoruba from Ijesha, Baba Sala, regarded as the father of modern Nigerian comedy, alongside other dramatists like Hubert Ogunde, Kola Ogunmola, Oyin Adejobi and Duro Ladipo popularized theater and television acting in Nigeria. He was a prolific filmmaker. Significantly, Baba Sala started his career in show business as a "Juju Music" musician, fronting in 1964 a group known as the Federal Rhythm Dandies, where he tutored and guided the jùjú music maestro King Sunny Adé who was his lead guitar player.

== Life ==
Olaiya was born in Ilesha, Southwest Nigeria, he was raised in colonial Nigeria and grew up in the Northern provinces. His father worked as a teacher and later as an accountant, and the family moved quite often, living in Jos and Kano. As a young boy, Olaiya played the class clown and sometimes dressed outlandishly to please people. While he chose to develop a career in entertainment, his parents wanted a path that would lead to a professional career, such as in medicine or law.

Olaiya worked as a health inspector for the Lagos City Council, but as a young man with an interest in entertainment, he formed the musical group the Federal Rhythm Dandies, which had a young Sunny Ade as a member. The group played briefly before Olaiya switched from music to drama, he wrote and staged dramatic plays similar to the style crafted by the forerunners of the genre, Ogunde and Ladipo. However, seeking to do something new, he dabbled in comedy and founded the Alawada group. In 1965, the group got a break when it won a contest organized by Western Nigeria Television that led to the creation of a t.v. show. The group became more known when their comedy sketches were aired on WNTV. Olaiya's main character in the group was Baba Sala, a pensioner who sometimes wore torn and oversized trousers and a table clock as a wrist watch. He developed the character further with a tendency to be both a miser and a lecher.

In 1982, Olaiya made his big screen debut in Orun Mooru, directed by Ola Balogun and co-produced by himself. He played his signature character Baba Sala, a man from a poor background who had built some wealth selling electronics in the city only to lose it to greed assisted by the advice of a dubious babalawo. The movie was well received but was bootlegged, which affected box office receipts. Olaiya then directed and produced his next film, Aare Agbaye, in 1983. His third film, Mosebolatan, was directed by Ade Folayan with Tunde Kelani as cinematographer. The movie was artistically and financially successful. In the 1990s, Olaiya dabbled in the home video market with Agba Man and Return Match, two slapstick comedies that lacked the technical qualities of his early films.

== Filmography ==
- Orun Mooru (1982)
- Aare Agbaye (1983)
- Mosebolatan (1985)
- Obee Gbona (1989)
- Diamond (1990 Home video)
- Agba Man (1992, Home Video)
- Return Match (1993, Home Video)
- Ana Gomina (1996, home video)
- Tokunbo (1985, TV)

== Death ==
In October 2018, Baba Sala died of what was referred by his media aide as "old-age related sickness". After his death, Best of Nollywood Magazine announced that the category "Comedy of the year" will now be known as the "Moses Adejumo Comedy of the Year" to honour him for his contribution to the industry.

== See also ==
- List of Nigerian actors
