= Adaora Ukoh =

Nigerian actress

- Born: 27 April 1982 (age 44); Anambra, Nigeria
- Education: University of Lagos
- Occupation: Actress
- Years active: 1995–present
- Spouse: Basil Eriofolor
- Children: 1

Adaora Ukoh is a Nigerian Nollywood actress who has featured in movies including Thy Kingdom Come, Black Bra and Lekki Wives. She is the host of Divas Dynasty and the CEO of Adaora Couture for over-sized women. She also spoke out when the Chibok girls went missing.

== Biography ==
Ada was born on 27 April 1982 in Anambra State. She attended St. John College and studied law at the University of Lagos.

She entered the Nollywood industry at the age of 16 in 1998, starring in Deadly Affair. Subsequently, she played different roles in films. In Lekki Wives, she featured as Miranda. Her roles are limited due to her big size, but she thinks her shape is a gift and blessing. Adaora had to go bald in the movie Thy Kingdom Come when she acted as a widow.

== Personal life ==
The actress is married to Basil Eriofolor and had a son who came out after some hours in the labour room.

== Filmography ==
- Onyeegwu (2023) as Alex's sister
- The Apartment (2022) as Meg
- The 3 Sides (2022) as Gloria
- The Ex Wife (2021) as Nene
- Broken Vine (2021) as Mofe
- Half Measure (2020) as Aunty Aanu
- The Bosslady (2019) as Omotola
- Taunting Faith (2019) as Patricia
- Wetin Women Want (2018) as Fatima
- Fit Fam (2018) as Cordelia
- Price of Deceit (2017) as Uju
- Cajole (2016)
- Palace War (2014) as Martina
- Lekki Wives (2013 - 2015) as Miranda
- A Better Tomorrow (2011) as Florence
- Behind a Smile (2009) as Maria
- Four Sisters (2008) as Angela
- Keziah (2007) as Monica
- Johnbull & Rosekate (2007) as Sarah
- The High Class (2006) as Blessing
- Only Love (2005) Uloma
- Black Bra (2005)
- Standing Alone (2004) as Tessy
- Final Whistle (2000) as Tina
- Curse from Beyond (1999) as Felicia
- Karishika II (1999) as Ratoka
- Karishika (1998) as Esther
- Blood Money 2 (1998) as Miriam
- Evil Genius (1998)
- Rituals (1997)
- Blood Money (1997) as Girl
- Deadly Affair (1995)
