= Blood Money (1997 film) =

1997 Nigerian occult film

- Directed by: Chico Ejiro
- Produced by: Ojiofor Ezeanyaeche
- Release dates: 1997 (Part 1); 1998 (Part 2)
- Country: Nigeria
- Language: English

Blood Money: The Vulture Men, also known as Blood Money, is a 1997 Nigerian occult film directed by Chico Ejiro and starring Kanayo O. Kanayo, Zack Orji, Francis Agu, Steve Eboh, Francis Duru, Sam Dede, and Ejike Asiegbu.

== Plot ==
After being scammed, bank manager Mike is reunited with former schoolmate and police chief Collins, who has since become a millionaire profiting off organ trade. Collins persuades Mike to become a fellow member of the secret cult known as the Vultures, which is led by a "Great Vulture" spirit who promises Mike "instant wealth". At the Great Vulture's command, Mike kidnaps a child who is then imbued with moneymaking abilities. Unbeknownst to Mike, the child is Chief Collins' only son, thus his kidnapping creates a rift between the two men. Three years later, the Great Vulture demands a blood sacrifice from Mike, who delays this by offering his wife and mother instead. In the film's second arc, Mike attempts to appease the vengeful spirit of his mother by collecting seven human heads; his newfound life as a serial killer is constantly interfered with by the police.

== Cast ==
- Zack Orji as Mike
- Kanayo O. Kanayo as Chief Collins
- Wassim A. Agha as Mr. Farouk
- Francis Agu as S.P.
- Sam Dede as Cult Leader
- Ejike Asiegbu as Boss
- Francis Duru as Jude
- Adaora Ukoh as Miriam
- Segun Arinze
- Emeka Ani
- Gentle Jack as Bodyguard
- Amaechi Muonagor as Cult Member
- Maureen Ihua as Lilian
- Emma Ugwueke as Chichi
- Victor Affiah as Joshua
- Vincent Ajaegbu as Junior
- Mandela Ajah
- Ernest Asuzu
- Pat Attah
- Isaac David as Police
- Kunle Coker
- Andy Chukwu

== Production and release ==
The film was produced by Ojiofor Ezeanyaeche and directed by Chico Ejiro. It was released in 1997 as Blood Money: The Vulture Men to commercial success, making it OJ Productions' "first big hit" and thereby catapulting Kanayo O.Kanayo and Zack Orji to continental fame.

== Reception ==
Writing for Africa Today, John C. McCall described Blood Money as a "melodramatic morality tale focused on the cult phenomenon familiar to most Nigerians" (of "money cults" and "money medicine" or ogwu ego) and "a useful distillation of cultural themes and knowledge" similar to how The Godfather would be a useful introduction to organised crime in the United States. Saheed Aderinto and Paul Osifodunrin argue in The Third Wave of Historical Scholarship on Nigeria (2013) that the graphic content in Blood Money "do not represent mere horror fantasy, but dramatisations of the predatory capitalism of the country (indeed the world)".
