= Jimi Solanke =

Nigerian actor and poet (1942–2024)

- Born: 4 July 1942; Lagos State, Colony and Protectorate of Nigeria
- Died: 5 February 2024 (aged 81); Sagamu, Ogun State, Nigeria
- Citizenship: Nigerian
- Education: University of Ibadan
- Occupations: Film actor Playwright; Poet Folk Singer Dramatist
- Known for: Kongi's Harvest, Sango, Shadow Parties
- Relatives: Oyinkansola Solanke, Kehinde Solanke, Arole Taiwo Solanke, Seun Solanke, Lope Solanke, Sayo Solanke, Sola Solanke

Jimi Solanke (4 July 1942 – 5 February 2024) was a Nigerian film actor, dramatist, folk singer, poet, and playwright.

== Early life ==
Solanke graduated from the University of Ibadan, where he obtained a diploma certificate in drama.

== Career ==
After graduation, Solanke moved to the United States, where he created a drama group called The Africa Review, focusing on African culture. Members of this group usually put on African clothing, specifically Yoruba costume. They performed in Black African schools. Solanke established himself in Los Angeles, California, where his storytelling career began. He was described as a "master storyteller" by CNN.

In 1986, he returned to Nigeria with three members of the African Review group to work with the NTA. He also played the minstrel on the children's show Storyland. His reputation earned him the lead role in most of Ola Balogun's films. He was part of the team that made the film Kongi's Harvest by Nobel Laureate Wole Soyinka.

== Death ==
Solanke died at Olabisi Onabanjo University Teaching Hospital in Sagamu, Ogun State, Nigeria, on 5 February 2024, at the age of 81.

== Filmography ==
- Kongi's Harvest (1970)
- Sango: The Legendary African King (1997)
- Shadow Parties (2021) as Akanji's Father
- Jagun Jagun (2023) as Narrator
