= Kate Henshaw =

Nigerian actress (born 1971)

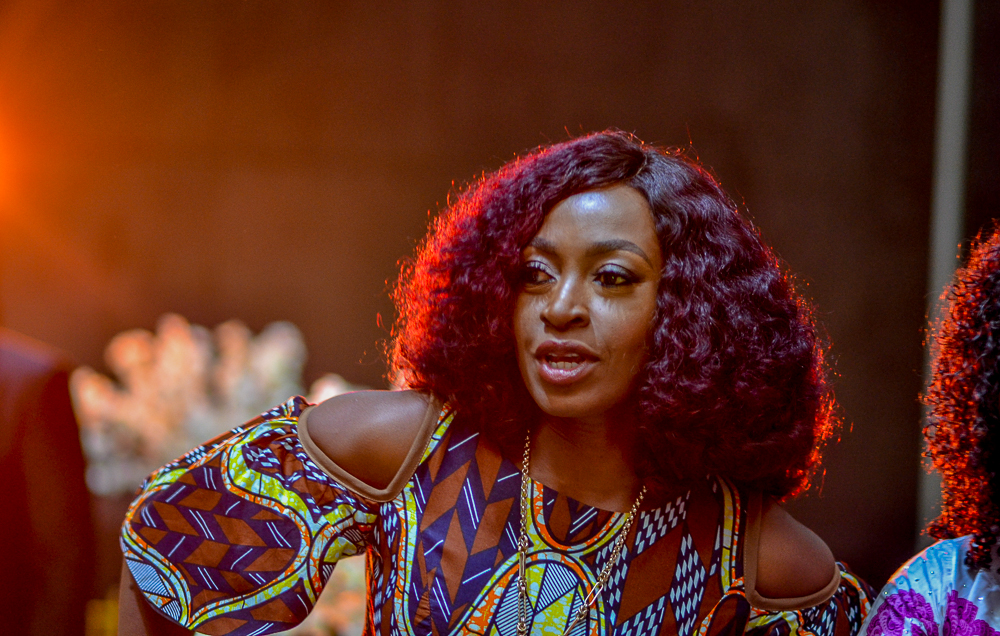
- Kate Henshaw at Pastor Lawrence Onochie 50th birthday celebration in Ikeja, Lagos State, Nigeria, 2019
- Born: Kate Henshaw; 19 July 1971 (age 55); Calabar, Cross River, Nigeria
- Education: University of Calabar, LUTH (Lagos University Teaching Hospital) in Lagos.
- Occupation: Actress
- Spouse: Roderick James Nuttal (m. 1999; div. 2011)
- Children: 1
- Relatives: Andre Blaze (cousin)

Kate Henshaw, also known as Kate Henshaw-Nuttall (born 19 July 1971), is a Nigerian actress. In 2008, she won the Africa Movie Academy Award for Best Actress in a Leading Role for her performance in Stronger than Pain.

== Early life ==
Henshaw was born on 9 July 1971 in Cross River State, Nigeria, the eldest of four children. She attended St. Mary Private School in Ajele, Lagos State, for her primary education and later Federal Government Girl College, Calabar, for her secondary education. She spent one year in remedial studies at the University of Calabar before majoring in medical microbiology at the School of Medical Laboratory Science, Lagos University Teaching Hospital (LUTH). Henshaw worked at the Bauchi State General Hospital. Before becoming an actress, Henshaw worked as a model, featuring in several commercials, including a print and television advertisement for Shield deodorant.

== Career ==
In 1993, Henshaw auditioned for the lead role in the film When the Sun Sets and was selected, marking her first appearance in a major Nollywood film. Henshaw has starred in over 45 Nollywood films.

In 2008, she won the Africa Movie Academy Award for Best Actress in a Leading Role for her performance in Stronger than Pain.

She was nominated for Best Actress in a Leading Role at the African Movie Academy Award in 2018 for her role in Roti.

=== Politics ===
On 19 July 2014, Henshaw launched her campaign website while contesting to represent the Calabar Municipal/Odukpani Federal constituency under the platform of the Peoples Democratic Party. Henshaw lost the primary election to Essien Ayi but was appointed as Special Adviser Liaison Lagos by the Cross River State Governor Ben Ayade in December 2015.

=== Endorsement ===
In 2012, Henshaw became the brand ambassador for a UK-based perfume line, Blessing perfumes. She served as a brand ambassador for Onga seasoning, produced by Promasidor Nigeria Limited. In September 2012, Henshaw was selected as a judge on the reality show Nigeria Got Talent, alongside Dan Foster. In 2013, she and Banky W were appointed brand ambassadors for Samsung Mobile Division. In January 2019, Henshaw was selected as one of the 50 judges on the CBS international talent show called The World's Best. She served as an ambassador for the telecommunication company Glo.

== Personal life ==
Henshaw married British-born Roderick James Nuttall in 1999, and they have one child together. Henshaw and Nuttall divorced in 2011.

== Honours ==
In 2011, Henshaw was appointed a Member of the Order of the Federal Republic (MFR) by the Nigerian government.

== Awards and nominations ==
Year	Award ceremony	Category	Film	Result	Ref
2008	African Movie Academy Awards	Best Actress in a Leading Role	Stronger Than Pain	Won	
2017	Best of Nollywood Awards	Best Supporting Actress –English	The Women	Won	
2018	African Movie Academy Awards	Best Actress in a Leading Role	Roti	Nominated	

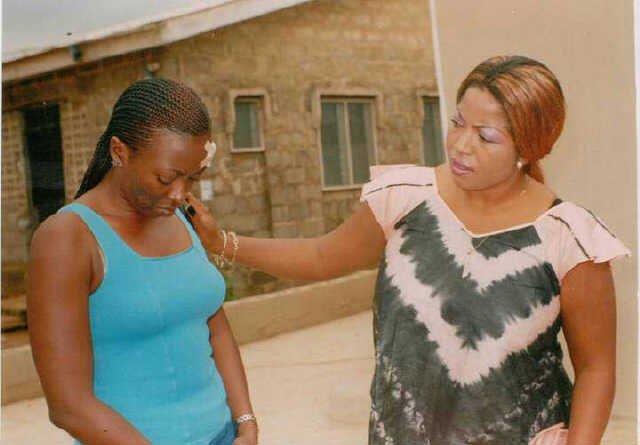
Kate Henshaw on set with Chioma Toplis (Stolen Bible, 2004)

== Filmography ==
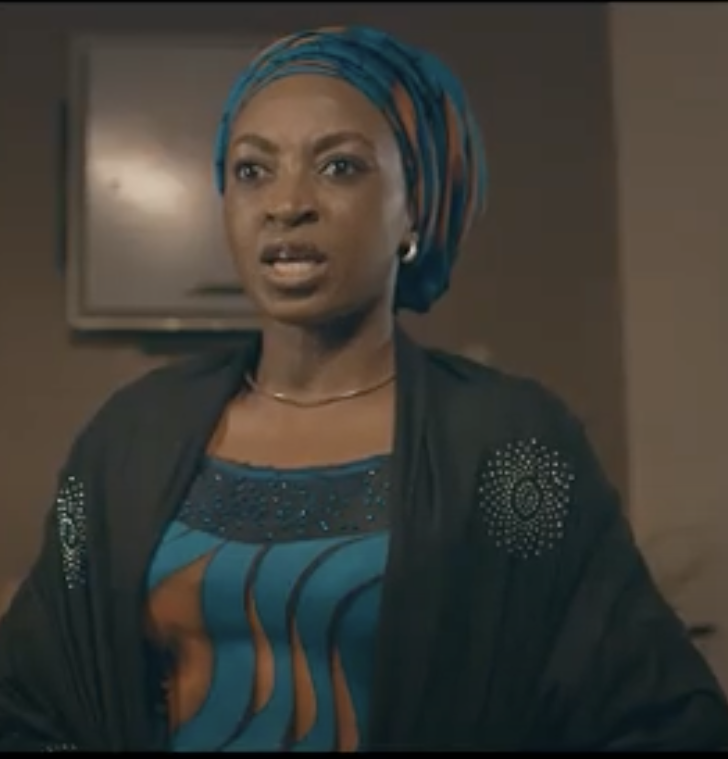
Kate Henshaw in 4th Republic

- When The Sun Sets (1993) as Omono
- Domitilla (1996) as Jenny
- Faces (1996)
- Above Death: In God We Trust (2003)
- A Million Tears (2006)
- My Little Secret (2006)
- Stronger Than Pain (2007) as Eringa
- Show Me Heaven (2007) as Prisca
- Tears In my Eyes (2008)
- Take me to Jesus (2008)
- The Meeting (2012) as Mrs. Ikomi
- False (2013) as Tosin
- New Horizons (2014) as Adesua
- A Few Good Men (2014) as Ada
- Iquo's Journal (2015) as Iquo
- Aremu The Principal (2015)
- Roti (2017) as Diane
- The Women (2018) as Ene Enweuzo
- Chief Daddy (2018) as Teni Beecroft
- New Money (2018) as Fatima Odumosu
- The Ghost and the House of Truth (2019) as Inspector Folashade
- 4th Republic (2019) as Mabel King
- The Fugitive (2019)
- Unintentional (2021) as Sefi's mother
- The Wait (2021) as Tilewa
- Seeking Refuge (2022) as Blessing Akinlade
- Blood Sisters (2022) as Uduak Ademola
- Kofa (2022) as Kate Mshelia
- Bank Alert (2023) as Jade
- Nine (2023) as Mother Assassin
- The House of Secrets (2023) as Mrs Eket
- This is Lagos (2023)
- Deafening Silence (2024)
- Voltage (2024)
- All of Us (2024) as Miss Rita
