= Wale Ogunyemi =

Nigerian dramatist, film actor, prolific playwright and scholar

- Born: 12 August 1939; Osun State, Nigeria
- Died: 17 December 2001 (aged 62)
- Citizenship: Nigerian
- Education: University of Ibadan
- Occupation: playwright
- Years active: 1963–2001
- Known for: The Lion and the Jewel; Kongi's Harvest; Sango; Langbodo

Chief Wale Ogunyemi, OFR (12 August 1939 – 17 December 2001) was a Nigerian veteran seasoned dramatist, film actor, prolific playwright, and Yoruba language scholar.

== Early life ==
Ogunyemi was born on 12 August 1939 at Igbajo, a city in Osun State, southwestern Nigeria, to Samuel Adeosun and Mary Ogunyemi. He attended the University of Ibadan in 1967 for a year course in drama, the same year he was appointed as a research assistant at Ibadan Institute of African Studies, where he later retired.

== Career ==
Ogunyemi began his acting career as a seasonal actor with the new Western Nigerian television service in the early 1960s. He later worked with professor Wole Soyinka, a Nobel Laureate and became a foundation member of Soyinka Orisun Theatre. His credible performance made him a choice for the role he played as "The bale" in The Lion and the Jewel and Dende in Kongi's Harvest by professor Wole Soyinka. He also featured in The Beatification Of Area Boy, a play by Wole Soyinka premiered at the West Yorkshire Playhouse in 1995. He had written and co-scripted several dramas before his death in December 2001.

== Filmography ==
- Thunderbolt: Magun (2001) as Herbalist
- The Lion and the Jewel
- Kongi's Harvest (1970) as Dende
- Sango: The Legendary African King (1997)
- The Beatification Of Area Boy
- The Ijaye War (1970)
- Kiriji (1976)
- The Divorce (1975)
- Aare Akogun (1968) and Everyman *Eniyan, published in 1987)
- Langbodo (1979)

== Awards ==
- Member of the Order of the Niger awarded in 1982 by the president of the Federal Republic of Nigeria
- Majeobaje of Okuku, a chieftaincy title conferred on him by the Olokuku of Okukuland
