= Bob-Manuel Udokwu =

Nigerian film actor and director (born 1963)

- Born: Bob-Manuel Obidimma Udokwu; 18 April 1967 (age 59); Ogidi, Nigeria
- Education: University of Port Harcourt
- Occupations: Actor, director
- Spouse: Cassandra Joseph
- Children: Elyon Chinaza and Marcus Garvey

Bob-Manuel Obidimma Udokwu (born 18 April 1967) is a Nigerian actor, movie director, producer and politician. Udokwu was nominated for Best Actor in a Supporting Role at the 2013 Nollywood Movies Awards for his role in the film Adesuwa (2012). He received the Lifetime Achievement Award at the 10th Africa Movie Academy Awards in 2014.

== Early life ==
Bob-Manuel was born to Mr. Geoffrey Nwafor Udokwu and Ezelagbo Udokwu in Nkwelle-Ogidi, Anambra State.

== Education ==
He attended St. Peters Primary School (now Hillside Primary School) in the Coal Camp, Enugu, Enugu State, for his elementary education and Oraukwu Grammar School, Oraukwu, Anambra State, for his secondary education. He proceeded to the University of Port Harcourt, Rivers State, Nigeria, where he obtained a Bachelor of Arts degree in Theatre Arts. He later bagged a master's degree in political science with a specialization in international relations from the University of Lagos. He was the president of the Nigeria University Theater Arts Student Association from 1989 – 1990.

== Personal life ==
Udokwu met Cassandra Joseph when he was doing his master's degree program at the University of Lagos, while she was an undergraduate at the university. They married on 19 February 2000. They have two children: Elyon Chinaza and Marcus Garvey. He is a Christian. In 2022, he was appointed by governor Charles Soludo of Anambra State as a special adviser on entertainment, tourism, and media.

Udokwu enrolled his children in public educational institutions to ensure they experienced a grounded upbringing despite his status as a high-profile celebrity. However, his daughter experienced bullying from peers during her schooling as a result of his public visibility and fame.

== Filmography ==
=== Film ===
Year	Title	Role
1992	Living in Bondage	Mike
1993	Living in Bondage 2	Mike
1993	When the Sun Sets	
1994	Black Maria	
1995	Rattlesnake	Maduako Olisa Jnr
1995	True Confessions	
1997	Rituals	Terry
1998	Blood Money: The Vulture Men 2	Bank Inspector
1998	Karishika	Pastor Evarist
1998	Most Wanted 1&2	Alex
1998	Captive	Nick
1999	Tokunboh	Prince Chidi
1999	Camouflage	
2000	Executive Crime	Stanley
2001	Mothering Sunday	Ejike
2002	Evil Doers	John
2002	My Girl	
2002	Old School	
2003	Private Sin	Nurse 1
2004	Risky Affair	Steve
2005	Games Women Play	Bill
	What a World	
2006	Naked Sin	
	My Time	
	Home Apart	
2006	Games Men Play	
2006	Soul Engagement	
2007	The Key for Happiness	Kelvia
2007	A Time to Love	Peter
2007	Cover Up	Harrison
2007	Endless Tears	
2007	Forgive Me 1&2	
2008	Tears in Marriage 1&2	
2008	Heaven after Hell	
2012	Adesuwa	
2016	Break the Silence	
2019	Living in Bondage: Breaking Free	Mike
2024	Ugly Bird	King
2024	Life in Pieces	
2024	Hijack '93	Lieutenant Dokunbo

=== Television ===
Year	Title	Role
	At Your Service	
1991–1994	Checkmate	
2020	It's a Crazy World (2020–2021)	Don Chukwuma

== See also ==
- List of Igbo people
- List of Nigerian film producers
