= Obafemi Lasode =

Nigerian actor and film director (1955–2025)

- Born: 4 December 1955; Port Harcourt, Nigeria
- Died: 24 July 2025 (aged 69)
- Citizenship: Nigerian
- Education: Brooklyn College, City University of New York
- Occupations: Musician; songwriter; playwright; film producer; director
- Years active: 1983–2025
- Notable work: Sango

Obafemi Lasode (4 December 1955 – 24 July 2025) was a Nigerian musician, film director and producer, songwriter, music producer, and playwright. He was the chief executive officer of Even-Ezra Nigeria Limited, the stable that produced an award-winning movie titled Sango in 1997.

== Early life ==
Obafemi Bandele Lasode was born on 4 December 1955 in Port Harcourt, the capital of Rivers State, Nigeria, but hailed from Abeokuta, a city in Ogun State, southwestern Nigeria.

He attended St. Gregory's College at Obalende in Lagos State, where he obtained the West African Senior School Certificate. He later obtained a Bachelor of Science degree in business administration from Kogod School of Business, Washington, D.C. Thereafter, he obtained a Master of Science degree in Communication Art from Brooklyn College, City University of New York.

== Career ==
Lasode joined the services of Inner City Broadcasting Corporation, New York City, in 1983 as a promotions coordinator, where he hosted Sonny Okosuns in 1984 at the world-famous Apollo Theater in Harlem.

He produced the African music programme Afrika in Vogue on Radio Nigeria 2, which ran for a year from the first quarter of 1989. In 1995, he established Afrika 'n Vogue/Even-Ezra Studios.

In 1997, he produced and directed an award-winning African epic titled Sango, a film that was selected to open the Minneapolis–Saint Paul International Film Festival in 2002. He authored a book titled Television Broadcasting: The Nigerian Experience (1959–1992), currently in use in Nigerian universities.

== Death ==
Lasode died on 24 July 2025, at the age of 69.

== Filmography ==
- Sango (1997)
- Mask of Mulumba (1998)
- Lishabi
- Tears of Slavery

== See also ==
- List of Nigerian film producers
