= Karishika =

1998 Nigerian horror film

- Release dates: 1998 (Part 1); 1999 (Part 2)
- Country: Nigeria
- Language: English

Karishika is a 1998 Nigerian supernatural horror film. It stars Becky Okorie in the lead role.

== Plot ==
A man waits outside a hospital delivery room. Minutes later, a nurse emerges to inform him that his wife has given birth to a yam tuber. He immediately leaves the hospital in anger. This leads to a fallout between him and his wife upon her discharge. Following a heated argument, she strikes him with a pestle, and he falls to the ground dead. Karashika appears and tells her to hang herself, which she does, and she is taken to hell by Karashika.

A boy named Divine stands up in church to read John 3:16 to the congregation, after which the pastor (Joseph Okechukwu) preaches about God’s sacrifice and highlights a model Christian family, of which Divine is the only child.

Lucifer begins preparations to send out agents who will cause more people to sin, thereby increasing the population of hell. They arrive on Earth, in Lagos, Nigeria, where they are greeted by a group of demonic spirit mediums. They lodge in a hotel, paying with money that appears out of thin air. While the demons are holding a meeting, the hotel receptionist stands outside the door, spying on them through the keyhole. One of the demons disappears and reappears behind the receptionist. The demons abduct Divine, who later returns home behaving differently. They also cause a disturbance in a bar, resulting in a shoot-out. Additionally, they recruit a human bank manager to work with them, as well as a magician, whom they meet backstage after his performance.

Back in hell, Lucifer burns one of his subjects for disobedience as a warning to others.

Back on Earth, a man is run over by a car after being distracted by one of the female demons. The demonic spirit within Divine is stirred. The demons go out to local bars to pick up victims, who are then killed, and their souls are taken to hell.

Divine’s father rebukes him for stealing money, while his mother defends him.

The pastor is tempted by one of the female demons, and God makes a wager with the devil concerning the pastor’s devotion. The pastor passes the test, but only just.

Divine’s mother awakens from a bad dream, and Divine’s father calms her before they both return to sleep. However, Divine’s father then experiences a nightmare. The pastor visits Divine’s home and exorcises him. All the demons appear out of thin air and engage him in battle. God removes Lucifer’s power to harm the pastor, grants the pastor victory, and unleashes His wrath upon the devil.

== Cast ==
- Becky Okorie as Karishika
- Bob-Manuel Udokwu as Pastor Evarist
- Sandra Achums as Bianca
- Ifeanyi Ikpoenyi as Pastor James/Rakadana
- Obi Madubogwu as Lucifer
- Andy Chukwu as Elder Bobby/Barashi
- Steve Eboh as Car driver
- Sonny McDon as Elder Desmond
- Adaora Ukoh as Esther/Ratoka
- Melissa Yesuf as Nektar
- Ernest Asuzu as Rasha
- Amaechi Muonagor as Jonathan
- Joseph Okechukwu as Pastor Gideon
- Ejike Metusela as Sabona/Julius
- Jennifer Olisa as Kate
- Vivian Metchie as Mrs. Onah
- Chukwuma Onwudiwe as Doctor
- Chiamaka Nwobodo as Nurse 1
- Ngozi Nnabuchi as Nurse 2
- Chukwudi Onu as Church member
