= Rachel Oniga =

Nigerian actress (1957–2021)

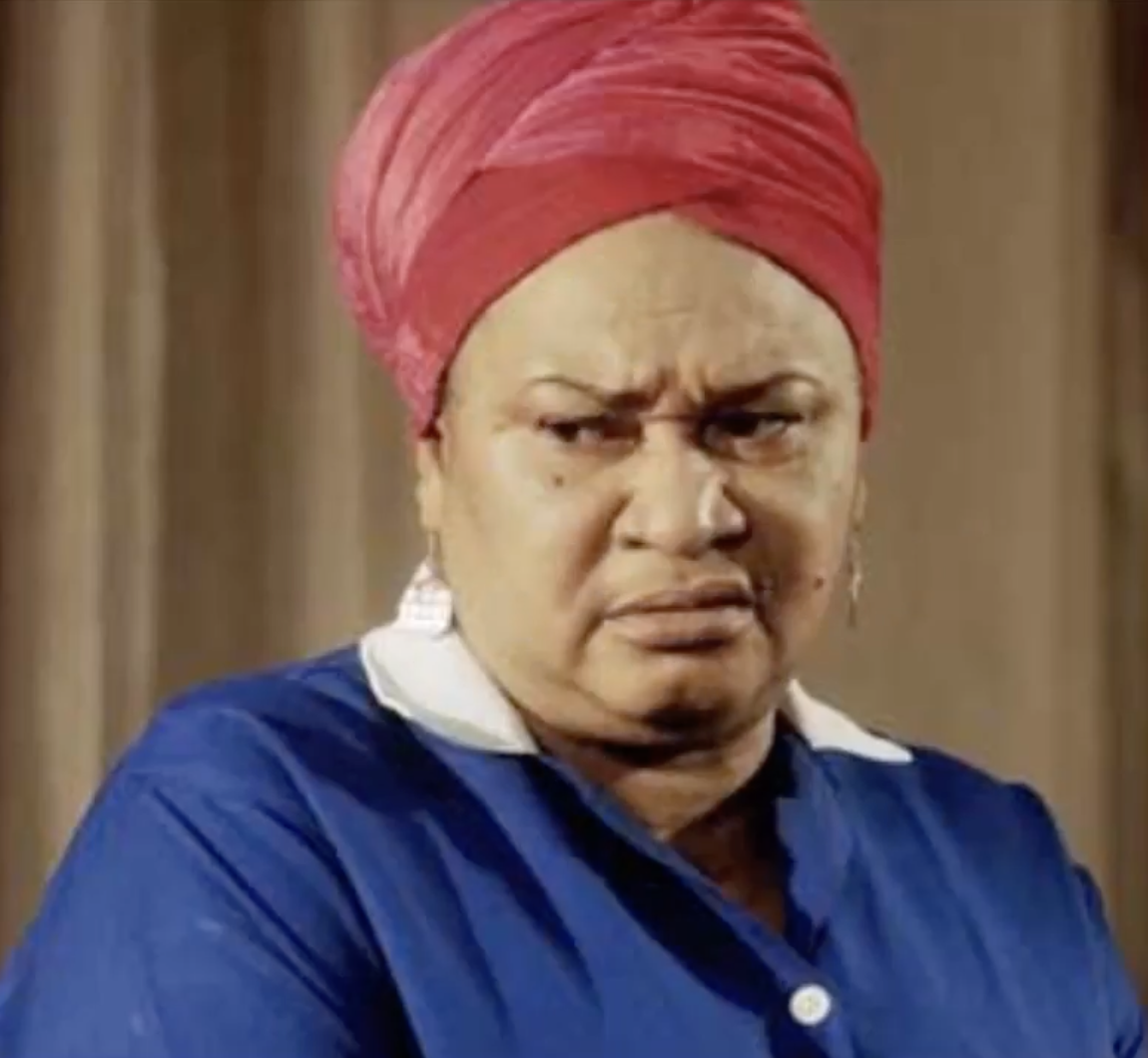
- Born: 23 May 1957; Ebute Metta, Lagos, British Nigeria
- Died: 30 July 2021 (aged 64)
- Other name: Tabuno
- Citizenship: Nigerian
- Occupation: Film actress
- Years active: 1993–2021
- Notable work: Owo Blow

Rachel Oniga (23 May 1957 – 31 July 2021) was a Nigerian film actress.

== Early life and career ==
Originally from Eku, Delta State in Southern Nigeria, although she was born on 23 May 1957 in Ebute Metta, Lagos State. She began her acting career in 1993, shortly after her divorce. She worked briefly at Ascoline Nigeria Limited, a Dutch consultant company before her first movie titled Onome and her debut Yoruba movie was Owo Blow. Over the years, Oniga has featured in notable Nigerian films such as Sango, a movie scripted by Wale Ogunyemi and produced and directed by Obafemi Lasode and Wale Adenuga's television series, Super story.

== Personal life ==
Oniga became a grandmother when her daughter Georgia delivered a baby.

== Death ==
Oniga died on 30 July 2021 from a heart-related ailment.

== Selected filmography ==
- Agbo-Odaju (1995?)
- Asiri Meta (1995?)
- Mysterious Child (1995?)
- Aramide (1996)
- Beyond Pardon (1996)
- Blood on My Hands (1996)
- The Golden Cage (1996)
- Owo Blow (1997) as Mrs. Owolabi
- Broken Wings (1997)
- Day Break (1997)
- Out of Bounds (1997)
- Sango (1997)
- In the Name of the Father (1998?)
- Late Arrival (2001)
- Itohan (2002)
- My Only Love (2003) as Adaobi
- Passion of Mind (2004)
- Afitimbaku (2005)
- Axe Blade (Enu Aake) (2005?)
- Odaye Atunwa (2005)
- Ofin Kokanla (2005)
- Owo Nwami (2005?)
- Ejiworo (2006?)
- Felele (2006?)
- Igi Woroko (2006?)
- Itiju nla (2006)
- Kokoro ola (2006?)
- Oko Mi (2006)
- Okun Emi (2006?)
- Ori Bamise (2006?)
- Origin (Ile) (2006?)
- Tide Ba Baje (2006)
- Wundia: The Spinster (2006)
- Wura l'obinrin (2006)
- Ana S'ana (2007)
- Power of Sin
- Restless Mind
- Tomo tiya (2008) as Iya Yemi
- Funmilayo Baby (2009) as Iya Jide
- Omo Ghetto (2010) as Yanju's Mother
- Doctor Bello (2013) as Denrele
- 30 Days in Atlanta (2014) as Mama Richard
- The Last 3 Digits (2015)
- Marriage Crises (2015)
- Flash of Pain (2016) as Hilda
- The Royal Hibiscus Hotel (2017) as Rose Adeniyi
- Surprise Wedding (2017) as Mama Tunde
- Power of 1 (2018) as LeJit's Mom
- Truth & Tidings (2019) as Eunice
- Mommy's Boy (2020)
- Rise of the Saints (2020) as Aunty Tolu
- Inspector K (2020-2021)
- My Village People (2021) as Witch
- Progressive Tailors Club (2021)
- Love Castle (2021) as Iyalode
- A Naija Christmas (2021) as Agatha Agu
- One Too Many (2022) as Judge
- Nightmare at Dusk (2022)
- Chief Daddy 2: Going for Broke (2022) as Aunty Ajoke

== See also ==
- List of Nigerian actresses
