= Ola Balogun =

Nigerian filmmaker and scriptwriter

- Born: 1 August 1945 (age 81); Aba, Southern Region, British Nigeria (now Aba, Imo State, Nigeria)
- Education: King's College, Lagos; University of Dakar (1962–63); University of Caen (1963–66); Institut des hautes études cinématographiques (1966–68)
- Occupations: Film director; screenwriter
- Years active: 1969–84
- Notable work: Black Goddess (1978)

Ola Balogun (born 1 August 1945) is a Nigerian filmmaker and scriptwriter. He also ventured into the Nigerian music industry in 2001. Balogun, who has been making films for more than three decades, is part of the first generation of Nigerian filmmakers.

Balogun studied cinematography at Institut des hautes études cinématographiques. Years after his graduation, he wrote his doctorate thesis on documentary films. On returning to Nigeria in 1968, he joined the staff of the Nigerian Film Unit, which was under the administration of the Ministry of Information, and later worked at the National Museum and Obafemi Awolowo University. Balogun's earliest films were short documentaries: One Nigeria released in 1969, Les Ponts de Paris (1971), Fire In the Afternoon (1971), Thundergod (1971), Nupe Masquerade (1972), In the Beginning (1972), and Owuama, A New Yam Festival (1973). His debut feature film was Alpha, a semi-autobiographical low-budget film released in 1972 when he was still at Ife. In 1973, he formed his own independent film company, Afrocult Foundation, which released his subsequent films. His follow-up to Alpha was Vivre, released in 1974, and then Nigersteel, a government-sponsored project. In 1975, he released Amadi, an Igbo-language film. His next project was directing and producing Ajani Ogun, a Yoruba-language film in partnership with Duro Ladipo and starring Ade Love. The film was a box-office hit, and the popularity of Ajani Ogun raised Balogun's profile in movie cinematography and direction within the country. Although his next film, Musik Man, was not well received by audiences, the subsequent project, Ade Love's Ija Ominira, found popularity. Balogun followed Ija Ominira with A Deusa Negra (1978), a Portuguese-Nigerian production, then Aiye (1980), starring Hubert Ogunde, and Orun Mooru (1982) with Moses Olaiya.

== Early life and education ==
Balogun was born in 1945 in Aba, Nigeria, to Yoruba parents. His father practised law in Aba until his death when Balogun was 12. The first language Balogun learned to speak was Igbo. He attended Christ the King School, Aba, from 1951 to 1957, then went to King's College, Lagos. He studied at the University of Dakar from 1962 to 1963, at the University of Caen in France (1963–66), and at the Institut des hautes études cinématographiques (from 1966 to 1968), where Christopher Miles was a fellow student.

== Early career ==
Balogun returned to Nigeria during the Nigerian Civil War and at the time, Nigeria did not have an indigenous cinema industry. In 1969, he was a scriptwriter with Nigeria's Federal Ministry of Information's film unit before he was posted to Paris as press attaché of the Nigerian embassy there, and in Paris, he published a play about Shango. He returned to Nigeria and was affiliated with the Institute of African Studies at University of Ife.

Balogun's first production was One Nigeria (1969), a documentary about his impression of the Nigerian Civil War. In the midst of the war, Balogun had accompanied a French observer group to the war front, where he witnessed the destruction caused by the war. The documentaries One Nigeria and Eastern Nigeria Revisited were influenced by his impression of the war. A pioneer of Nigerian filmmaking, Balogun produced his first films in the early 1970s. His 1981 film For Freedom! was entered into the 12th Moscow International Film Festival.

In 1973, he founded Afrocult Foundation, an independent film company.

== Film career ==
After producing documentaries, Balogun produced Alpha, a medium-length film about an African émigré in Paris. His follow-up was Vivre, a non-fiction story about his friend who became handicapped as a result of an accident. After Vivre, Balogun was commissioned by the government to produce Nigersteel, a film about Nigeria's industrialization stage. His next movie project dealt with the subject matter of embracing and not discarding African culture and tradition in the search for future goals. This film, Amadi, released in 1975, is an Igbo-language movie about a man moving back to the village after having limited success and little fulfilment in the city of Lagos. In the village, he used the knowledge and skills learned to promote the use of modern agricultural techniques. The film broke new ground in Nigerian cinema as the first feature-length movie in Igbo language. The film found success in Eastern Nigeria but limited success elsewhere.

Ajani Ogun, Balogun's first indigenous Yoruba-language film, is a musical released in celluloid form in 1975. The film had Ade Love in the lead role, while the majority of the crew came from Duro Ladipo's travelling theatre troupe. Balogun reached a wider audience with Ajani Ogun, and the success of the film led to an increase in the adoption of stage plays performed by Yoruba traveling theatres into feature-length movies. After the success of Ajani Ogun, his next project was Musik Man, a movie produced in pidgin and English so as to reach a wider audience. However, the film was not financially successful. Balogun bounced back with Ija Ominira, an adaptation of Adebayo Faleti's novel, Omo Olokun Esin, which was being performed on stage by a theatre troupe. The movie was produced in collaboration with Ade Love, his lead actor in Ajani Ogun; Ade Love was also the lead actor in Ija Ominira. There were filming difficulties between Balogun and Ade Love on the set of Ija Ominira, both men had minor disagreements about the direction of the movie. Balogun followed Ade Love's Ija Ominira with A Deusa Negra, also known as Black Goddess, which he both wrote and directed; the project was a Nigerian-Brazilian collaboration distributed by Embrafilme of Brazil. A Brazilian producer had seen some of Balogun's previous works and asked him to shoot a new movie in Brazil. Despite some tensions and financial challenges, he completed the film in 1978.

In Aiye (1979), Balogun expanded the stage play of one of Hubert Ogunde's popular acts into a feature-length film. The theme of the movie was a classic tale of the struggle between good and evil. The good was a traditional priest or babalawo and the evil characters were the witches in the village. Aiye, which employed many Yoruba stage actors and some technical crew from Black Goddess, was a financial success, although as with Ija Ominira, Balogun and Hubert Ogunde, the lead actor and co-producer, had some disagreements about the movie's direction.

In 1980, Balogun produced Cry Freedom (previously titled Haraka), with Prunella Gee and Albert Hall in the lead roles. The film was shot in Ghana, and Balogun used some technicians, such as Jose Medeiros, who had previously worked with him on A Deusa Negra. Cry Freedom, inspired by Meja Mwangi's Carcase for Hounds, is about an uprising that led to guerrilla warfare in an African country. The movie found fans among Nigerian intellectuals, but it did not appeal to a mass audience.

Balogun's collaboration with Moses Olaiya, also known as Baba Sala, was the big-budget Orun Mooru (Heaven is Hot). Thereafter, Balogun stopped working with lead actors from the Yoruba theatre group. In 1982, he released Money Power.

== Political life ==
Balogun was a member of President Babangida's Political Bureau but resigned due to concerns over the means of achieving the bureau's objectives.

Balogun has been a regular attendee at FESPACO (the Panafrican Film and Television Festival of Ouagadougou).

== Filmography ==
Year	Film	Director	Producer	Writer
1972	Alpha	Yes	Yes	Yes
1975	Ajani Ogun	Yes	Yes	Yes
1975	Amadi	Yes	Yes	Yes
1976	Musik Man	Yes	Yes	Yes
1978	Ija Ominira	Yes	Yes	
1978	Black Goddess	Yes		Yes
1979	Aiye	Yes	Yes	
1981	Cry Freedom	Yes	Yes	Yes
1982	Money Power	Yes	Yes	Yes
1982	Orun Mooru	Yes	Yes	
1988	River Niger, Black Mother	Yes		
1993	Magic of Nigeria	Yes		
1994	Destination Barbados	Yes		
1998	Gods of Africa in Brazil	Yes		Yes

== Sources ==
- Ukdike, Nwachukwu (1989). Black African cinema (Thesis). New York University.
