= Zeb Ejiro =

Nigerian filmmaker and producer

- Born: Isoko, Delta State, Nigeria
- Citizenship: Nigerian
- Occupations: Filmmaker; producer
- Relatives: Chico Ejiro (brother); Peter Red Ejiro (brother)
- Awards: MFR

Zeb Ejiro, MFR, is a Nigerian filmmaker and producer. He is one of the two brothers of Chico Ejiro, a veteran Nigerian filmmaker and producer.

In November 2005, Zeb received a national award of Order of the Federal Republic alongside Lere Paimo in recognition of his immense contributions to the Nigerian film industry.

== Filmography ==
- Domitila (1996)
- Nneka the Pretty Serpent (1994)
- Mortal Inheritance (1996)
- Sakobi: The Snake Girl (1998)
- Sakobi II: The Final Battle (1998)
- Domitilla II (1999)
- Extreme Measure (2003)
- Mortal sin (2003)
- A night in the Philippines II (2005)
- A night in the Philippines (2005)
- Yellow Cassava (2016)
- Pure honey (2017)
- Domitilla: The Sequel (2023)

== Awards ==
- Order of the Federal Republic (2005)

== See also ==
- List of Nigerian film producers
