= Liz Benson =

Nigerian actress

Elizabeth Benson
- Born: Elizabeth Benson; 5 April 1966 (age 60); Akwa Ibom
- Education: Sylvania State College USA
- Occupations: Actress, philanthropist, television personality
- Years active: 1993 - Present
- Spouse(s): Samuel Gabriel Etim, Bishop Great Ameye

Elizabeth 'Liz' Benson (born 5 April 1966) is a veteran Nigerian actress, television personality, and philanthropist.

== Early life and education ==
Liz was born in Etinan, Akwa Ibom State, in southern Nigeria. She attended Sylvania State College in the United States of America, where she got a degree in Dramatic Arts. Benson began acting when she was 5 years old.

== Career ==
=== Early success and quitting the film industry ===
She featured in Fortunes, a television soap opera, in 1993. Benson played the part of Mrs. Agnes Johnson in the soap, which ran for about two years on NTA Network. In 1994, her role in Glamour Girls, a successful home video film that focused on escorting, cemented her status as a film actress. Benson suddenly quit acting in 1996.

=== Return to Nollywood ===
Since returning to Nollywood, it was disclosed that she is a born-again Christian and now preaches the gospel on a full-time basis. In an interview, she explained that she would only act in films that she believed were in line with her faith.

== Personal life ==
Benson lost her first husband (Samuel Gabriel Etim) while around her mid-twenties. She said that she actually gained strength from his character, and that made her able to carry on with her children through the loss.

The Ibibio-born actress took another shot at marriage after her conversion. In a quiet court ceremony in Abuja in 2009, she married Bishop Great Ameye of the Freedom Family Assembly at the Rainbow Christian Assembly in Warri, Delta State. The couple is deeply involved in a Christian Evangelical ministry. While Benson is an evangelist, her husband, Ameye, is a pastor in Jesse Town, Ethiope West, Delta State. Benson is an evangelist and lives in Delta State with her husband. Together they run a ministry, Freedom Family Assembly.

== Selected filmography ==
Some of her more popular roles include her role as Titubi in Femi Osofisan's Morountodun and as Mrs. Agnes Johnson in Fortunes, a soap opera that ran for about two years on Nigerian Television Authority (NTA) Channel 10. She acted in a number of Nollywood video films such as Evil Men 1 and 2, Shame, Conspiracy, Izaga, Burden, Stolen Child, Faces, Dead End, Tycoon, Glamour Girls, Body of Vengeance and a horde of other movies, which includes:

- Still Falling (2021) as Mrs. Kuku
- Lotanna (2017) as Efya
- Children of Mud (2020) as Annie
- Lotanna (2017) as Efya
- "Idahosa Trails" (2017) as Sarah
- " Behind the Wheels" (2017) as Mama Elijah
- Hilarious Hilary (2015)
- Miss Teacher (2015) as Principal
- " Dry" (2015) as Matron
- Mummy Dearest (2015) as Rose Chinda
- Dry (2014) as Matron
- Toko taya (2007) as Stella
- Political Control (2006)
- Political Control 2 (2006)
- Political Control 3 (2006)
- Bridge-Stone (2005) as Polina
- Bridge-Stone 2 (2005)
- Crazy Passion (2005) a Rebecca
- Crazy Passion 2(2005)
- Day of Atonement (2005)
- Now & Forever(2005)
- Now & Forever 2 (2005)
- Squad Twenty-Three (2005)
- Squad Twenty-Three 2 (2005)
- Women in Power (2005)
- Women in Power 2 (2005)
- Inheritance (2004)
- Melody of Life (2004) as Anita
- Red Hot (2004)
- Turn Table (2004)
- Turn Table 2 (2004)
- World Apart (2004) as Mirabel
- World Apart 2 (2004)
- Èèkù-idà (2002)
- Èèkù-idà 2 (2002)
- Wisdom and Riches (2002)
- Wisdom and Riches 2 (2002)
- Dapo Junior (2000) .... Ronke
- Karishika: Part 2 1999 (1999)
- Chain Reaction (1999)
- Diamond Ring (1998)
- Diamond Ring 2 (1998)
- Karishika (1998)
- Scores to Settle (1998)
- Witches (1998) as Princess
- Yesterday (1997)
- Back to Life (1997)
- Glamour Girls 1996 (1996)
- True Confession (1995)
- Glamour Girls (1994)
- Silenced (????)
- Hour of Grace
- Lady Bianca
- Evil Men
- Matter of Choice (2024)
- Something About the Briggs (2024)
