= Sandra Achums =

Nigerian actress (born 1967)

- Born: 19 November 1967 (age 58); Imo State, Nigeria
- Status: married
- Education: State College Isolo Lagos
- Occupations: Actress, philanthropist, television personality
- Years active: 1995–2006
- Spouse: Tony
- Children: 2

Sandra Achums (born 19 November 1967) is a Nigerian television personality, philanthropist, and film actress.

== Early life and education ==
Achums was born in Imo State, Nigeria. She completed her primary, secondary, and tertiary education in Lagos State, with her secondary education at State College, Isolo.

== Career ==
In 1995, Achums made her film debut in Deadly Affair, appearing alongside Dolly Unachukwu, Jide Kosoko, and Emeka Ike. The film brought her wider recognition. She later appeared in the remake of Glamour Girls.

== Personal life ==
In 2006, Achums relocated from Nigeria to Germany, where she lives with her husband, Tony, and her children.

She gave birth to her son, Ryan, in Germany, announcing his birth in a social media post that read, "Welcome little baby Ryan to the world". She also has a daughter.

== Selected filmography ==
- Gone Forever (2006)
- Only in America (2005) as Jane
- Circle Of Tears (2004)
- Circle Of Tears II (2004)
- End Of The Game (2004)
- Expensive Game (2004) as Doris
- Victim of Love (2003) as Anita
- Ashanti (2003)
- Against The World (2003)
- Family Crisis (2003)
- Family Crisis II (2003)
- Six Problem Girls (2003)
- Tears In The Sun (2003)
- Outkast (2001)
- Outkast II (2002)
- Blue Sea (2002)
- Tears & Sorrows (2002) as Juliet
- Tears & Sorrows II (2002)
- Hatred (2001) as Chioma
- Hatred II (2001)
- Hatred III (2001)
- Oil Village (2001)
- Oil Village II (2001)
- The Last Vote (2001)
- Karishika II (1999) as Bianca
- My Cross (1998)
- Prophecy (1998) as Evelyne
- Karishika (1998) as Bianca
- Nightmare (1997)
- Deadly Affair II (1997)
- Day Break (1997)
- Dead End (1997?)
- Compromise (1996)
- Deadly Passion (1996?)
- Domitilla (1996) as Judith
- Deadly Affair (1995) as Bola
