= List of highest-grossing Nigerian films =

The following are the highest-grossing Nigerian films of all time in Nigerian cinemas. The 2025 film Behind the Scenes currently leads the chart, with ₦2,760,111,506 grossed over a few months; Call of My Life, released in 2026, is the latest film in the top 10. Revenues from special screenings, DVD sales, online streaming, and theatrical screenings outside English-speaking West Africa are excluded from this gross total. Films from this list have not been adjusted for inflation.

== Highest-grossing Nigerian films of all time ==
Films currently in theatrical release

Rank	Title	Year	Domestic Gross
1	Behind The Scenes	2025	₦2,760,111,506
2	Everybody Loves Jenifa	2024	₦1,882,549,548
3	A Tribe Called Judah	2023	₦1,404,187,806
4	Oversabi Aunty	2025	₦1,178,758,224
5	Call of My Life	2026	₦902,300,000
6	Battle on Buka Street	2022	₦668,423,056
7	Omo Ghetto: The Saga	2020	₦636,129,120
8	Gingerrr	2025	₦522,909,952
9	Alakada: Bad and Boujee	2024	₦500,581,650
10	The Wedding Party	2016	₦452,288,605
11	The Wedding Party 2	2017	₦433,197,377
12	Agesinkole: King of Thieves 2	2025	₦425,014,100
13	Ori (Rebirth)	2025	₦419,570,525
14	Agbara Nla -The Return	2026	₦408,300,000
14	Love and New Notes	2026	₦400,172,544
15	Chief Daddy	2018	₦387,540,750
16	Queen Lateefah	2024	₦365,517,443
17	The Waiter	2024	₦363,602,209
18	Reel Love	2025	₦356,834,175
19	The Return of Arinzo	2026	₦347,994,677
20	Brotherhood	2022	₦328,881,120
21	King of Thieves	2022	₦320,805,150
22	Iyalode	2025	₦306,360,025
23	Malaika	2023	₦302,086,925
24	Sugar Rush	2019	₦287,053,270
25	Ijakumo	2022	₦278,496,384
26	Christmas in Miami	2021	₦265,583,000
27	Labake Olododo	2025	₦264,281,948
28	Àjosepo	2024	₦257,254,189
29	Beast of Two Worlds (Ajakaju)	2024	₦252,801,675
30	King of Boys	2018	₦244,775,758
31	Merry Men: The Real Yoruba Demons	2018	₦235,628,358
32	Merry Men 2: Another Mission	2019	₦234,505,169
33	Ada Omo Daddy	2023	₦218,754,222
34	Owambe Thieves	2025	₦205,632,953
35	Lakatabu	2024	₦202,253,250
36	The Herd	2025	₦193,569,764
37	Your Excellency	2019	₦186,340,948
38	A Trip to Jamaica	2016	₦180,264,964
39	Prophetess	2021	₦178,744,340
40	10 Days in Sun City	2017	₦176,705,669
41	Living in Bondage: Breaking Free	2019	₦168,770,202
42	The Farmer's Bride	2024	₦167,219,970
43	Abanisete (The Ancestor)	2025	₦164,981,275
44	30 Days in Atlanta	2014	₦163,351,300
45	War Lord (Olori Ogun)	2025	₦159,746,045
46	Funmilayo Ransome-Kuti	2024	₦157,096,847
47	Colours of Fire	2025	₦148,195,619
48	A Very Dirty Christmas	2025	₦141,110,705
49	Onobiren (A Woman's Story)	2026	₦138,165,673
50	Thin Line	2024	₦136,529,751

== Franchises / sequel film ==
This is a list of highest-grossing franchises and sequel film in Nigeria. Films from this list have been adjusted for inflation. Coordinated by MG Group

Rank	Title	Producer	Initial Gross	Year	Adjusted for inflation (as of January 2025)	Total Estimation (in number and words)
1	Jenifa					
1	Everybody Loves Jenifa	Funke Akindele	₦1,882,553,548	2024	₦1,882,553,548	
2	The Return of Jenifa	Funke Akindele	₦35,000,000	2012	₦445,607,740	₦2,318,161,288 (2 Billion+)
2	Omo Ghetto					
1	Omo Ghetto: The Saga	Funke Akindele	₦636,129,120	2020	₦2,805,511,936	₦2,805,511,936 (₦2 Billion+)
3	The Wedding Party					
1	The Wedding Party	Don Omope, Zulu Oyibo, Ijeoma Agukoronye	₦452,288,605	2016	₦2,705,111,904	
2	The Wedding Party 2: Destination Dubai	Priscilla Nwanah, Temidayo Abudu, Tope Oshin, Naz Onuzo	₦433,197,377	2017	₦1,034,919,111	₦3,740,031,015 (₦3 Billion+)
4	Chief Daddy					
1	Chief Daddy	Temidayo Abudu, Mosunmola Abudu, Bode Asiyanbi	₦387,540,749	2018	₦944,111,419	₦387,540,749 (₦300 Million+)
5	A Trip					
1	Christmas in Miami	Ayo Makun	₦265,583,000	2021	₦383,819,019	
2	A Trip to Jamaica	Ayo Makun	₦180,264,964	2016	₦1,554,236,060	
3	10 Days in Sun City	Darlington Abuda	₦176,705,669	2017	₦1,198,527,740	
4	30 Days in Atlanta	Ayo Makun	₦163,351,300	2014	₦2,000,007,740	5,135,590,559 (₦5 Billion+)
6	King Of Boys					
1	King of Boys	Kemi Adetiba, Kene Okwuosa, Remi Adetiba	₦244,775,758	2018	₦1,071,607,740	₦244,775,758 (₦244 Million+)
7	Merry Men					
1	Merry Men: The Real Yoruba Demons	Darlington Abuda, Patrick Ovoke Odjegba	₦235,628,358	2018	₦1,023,607,740	
2	Merry Men 2: Another Mission	Darlington Abuda	₦234,505,169	2019	₦879,607,740	
3	Merry Men 3: Nemesis	Ayo Makun	₦117,836,230	2023	₦141,803,876	₦2,045,019,356 (₦2 Billion+)
8	Queen Lateefah					
1	Queen Lateefah	Wumi Toriola	₦218,127,627	2024	₦218,127,627	₦218,127,627 (₦218 Million+)
9	Living in Bondage					
1	Living in Bondage: Breaking Free	Steve Gukas, Dotun Olakunri, Charles Okpaleke	₦168,770,202	2019	₦633,607,740	₦633,607,740 (₦633 Million+)
10	Aki na Ukwa					
1	Aki and Pawpaw	Charles Okpaleke, Moses Babatope, Kene Okwuosa, Craig Shurn	₦136,379,049	2021	₦221,919,111	₦221,919,111 (₦221 Million+)
11	The Ghost and the Tout					
1	The Ghost and the Tout Too	Toyin Abraham	₦134,408,075	2021	₦218,919,111	
2	The Ghost and the Tout	Toyin Abraham, Samuel Olatunji	₦77,233,105	2018	₦347,607,740	₦566,526,851 (₦566 Million+)
12	Alakada					
1	Fate of Alakada: The Party Planner	Toyin Abraham	₦100,958,400	2020	₦155,919,111	
2	Alakada Reloaded	Toyin Abraham	₦74,331,349	2017	₦469,607,740	
3	Alakada Bad and Boujee	Toyin Abraham	₦500,000,000	2024	₦500,000,000	₦1,125,526,851 (₦1 billion+)
13	Money					
1	Quam's Money	Naz Onuzo, Zulumoke Oyibo, Damola Ademola, Omotayo Adeola	₦92,100,070	2020	₦143,919,111	
2	New Money	Naz Onuzo, Zulumoke Oyibo, Damola Ademola, Omotayo Adeola	₦41,595,000	2018	₦202,607,740	₦346,526,851 (₦346 Million+)
14	Kesari					
1	Kesari: The King	Ibrahim Yekini	₦77,161925	2023	₦92,594,310	₦92,594,310 (₦92 Million+)
15	On War					
1	My Wife & I	Omoni Oboli	₦67,882,573	2017	₦469,607,740	
2	Wives on Strike	Omoni Oboli	₦66,753,162	2016	₦549,607,740	
3	Moms at War	Omoni Oboli	₦65,278,052	2018	₦314,607,740	
4	Wives On Strike: The Revolution	Omoni Oboli	₦2,680,504	2014	₦35,887,740	
5	Wives on Strike: The Uprising	Omoni Oboli	₦TBA	2024	₦TBA	₦1,369,710,960 (₦1 Billion+)
16	Half Of A Yellow Sun					
1	Half of a Yellow Sun	Andrea Calderwood, Gail Egan	₦60,000,000	2017	₦421,607,740	₦421,607,740 (₦421 Million+)
17	Saamu Alajo					
1	The Vendor	Odunlade Adekola	₦46,534,650	2018	₦226,607,740	₦226,607,740 (₦255 Million+)
18	Hire					
1	Hire a Man	Chinneylove Eze	₦45,000,000	2017	₦317,607,740	
2	Hire a Woman	Chinneylove Eze	₦20,000,000	2016	₦169,007,740	₦486,615,480 (₦486 Million+)
19	Jelili					
1	Survival of Jelili	Femi Adebayo	₦29,000,000	2019	₦45,919,111	₦45,919,111 (₦45 Million+)
-	Total Estimation					₦19,832,759,745 (₦19 Billion+)

== Top selling franchises / sequel actor / producer ==
This list includes top selling franchises and sequel actor. Franchises and sequel films from this list have been adjusted for inflation. Coordinated by MG Group

Rank	Name	Producer	Franchise / Sequel	Total Estimation (in number and words)
1	Ayo Makun	Ayo Makun	A Trip, Merry Men	₦7,180,609,915 (₦7 Billion+)
2	Funke Akindele	Funke Akindele	Omo Ghetto, Jenifa	₦5,208,673,224 (₦5 Billion+)
3	Mosunmola Abudu	Mosunmola Abudu	The Wedding Party, Chief Daddy	₦4,127,571,764 (₦4 Billion+)
4	Omoni Oboli	Omoni Oboli	On War	₦1,369,710,960 (₦1 Billion+)
5	Toyin Abraham	Toyin Abraham	The Ghost and the Tout, Alakada	₦1,242,053,702 (₦1 Billion+)

== Highest grossing director ==
This list includes films directed and co-directed by a director

Rank	Title	Gross	Year
1	Funke Akindele	₦7,537,579,984	
	Behind the Scenes	₦2,759,944,506	2025
	Everybody Loves Jenifa	₦1,882,553,548	2024
	A Tribe Called Judah	₦1,404,187,806	2023
	Battle on Buka Street	₦668,423,056	2022
	Omo Ghetto: The Saga	₦636,129,120	2020
	Your Excellency	₦186,340,948	2019
2	Tunde Olaoye	₦4,642,497,054	
	Behind the Scenes	₦2,759,944,506	2025
	Everybody Loves Jenifa	₦1,882,553,548	2024
3	Adeoluwa Owu	₦1,940,766,349	
	Queen Lateefah	₦365,517,443	2024
	Adire	₦31,061,100	2023
	A Tribe Called Judah	₦1,404,187,806	2023
	Owambe Thieves	₦200,000,000	2025
4	Kayode Kasum	₦1,375,041,464	
	Reel Love	₦355,000,000	2025
	Sugar Rush	₦287,053,270	2019
	Fate of Alakada: The Party Planner	₦113,226,100	2020
	Quam's Money	₦92,100,070	2020
	Soole	₦51,006,700	2021
	Dwindle	₦43,924,110	2021
	Ponzi	₦32,137,250	2021
	Something Like Gold	₦60,163,273	2023
	Afamefuna	₦55,589,125	2023
	Lust, Love and Other Things	₦31,962,243	2023
	Ajosepo	₦253,842,323	2024
5	Adebayo Tijani	₦1,316,955,756	
	Alakada: Bad and Boujee	₦500,000,000	2024
	King of Thieves	₦320,805,150	2022
	Ijakumo	₦278,496,384	2022
	Ada Omo Daddy	₦218,754,222	2023
6	Niyi Akimolayan	₦1,153,745,981	
	The Wedding Party 2	₦433,197,377	2017
	Chief Daddy	₦387,540,749	2018
	Prophtess	₦178,744,340	2021
	My Village People	₦100,958,400	2021
	The Set Up	₦53,305,115	2019
7	Toyin Abraham	₦1,165,000,000	
	Oversabi Aunty	₦1,165,000,000	2025
8	Kemi Adetiba	₦697,064,363	
	The Wedding Party	₦452,288,605	2016
	King of Boys	₦244,775,758	2018
9	Tobi Makinde	₦668,423,056	
	Battle on Buka Street	₦668,423,056	2022
10	JJC Skillz	₦636,129,120	
	Omo Ghetto: The Saga	₦636,129,120	2020
11	Robert Peters	₦609,199,264	
	Christmas in Miami	₦265,583,000	2021
	A Trip to Jamaica	₦180,264,964	2016
	30 Days in Atlanta	₦163,351,300	2014
12	Moses Inwang	₦499,996,581	
	Merry Men 2	₦234,505,169	2019
	Merry Men 3: Nemesis	₦117,836,230	2023
	Bad Comments	₦66,584,531	2021
	American Driver	₦41,000,000	2017
	Lockdown	₦40,070,651	2021

== By year ==
Year	Title	Domestic Gross
2026	Call Of My Life	₦902,300,000
2025	Behind The Scenes	₦2,760,111,506
2024	Everybody Loves Jenifa	₦1,882,553,548
2023	A Tribe Called Judah	₦1,404,187,806
2022	Battle on Buka Street	₦668,423,056
2021	Christmas in Miami	₦265,583,000
2020	Omo Ghetto: The Saga	₦636,129,120
2019	Sugar Rush	₦287,053,270
2018	Chief Daddy	₦387,540,749
2017	The Wedding Party 2	₦433,197,337
2016	The Wedding Party	₦452,288,605
2015	Fifty	₦80,030,500
2014	30 Days in Atlanta	₦163,351,300
2013	Half of a Yellow Sun	₦60,000,000
2012	Last Flight To Abuja	₦57,050,000
2011	The Mirror Boy	₦18,000,000
2010	Ijé'	₦59,800,000
2009	The Figurine	₦30,000,000

== See also ==
- Lists of highest-grossing films
