= FilmOne Distributions =

Film production and distribution company

Filmone Distribution and Production
- Type: Private
- Industry: Entertainment
- Headquarters: Plot 1378D Joseph Namah Close, Off Karimu Kotun, Victoria Island, Lagos, Nigeria
- Areas served: West Africa
- Key people: Kene Okwuosa (Group CEO)
- Services: Film distribution, DCP encryption and Mastering etc

Filmone is an independent film distribution company in West Africa, headquartered in Lagos, Nigeria. Since 2013, the company has directly distributed local and international film content in the region; creating a channel for the exportation of local theatrical films (to the United Kingdom, United States, and other regions in sub-Saharan Africa) and being a distribution channel for film content from Hollywood.

In 2016, the company signed a pact with Hollywood media company 20th Century Fox, a partnership that has seen to the distribution of films within West Africa such as Independence Day: Resurgence, Logan, Assassin's Creed, and Kingsman: The Golden Circle.

In Nigeria, Filmone has distributed and/or co-produced several blockbuster films such as Half of a Yellow Sun The Wedding Party 1&2, Taxi Driver: Oko Ashewo, Okafor's Law, A Trip to Jamaica, 10 Days in Sun City, King of Boys, Royal Hibiscus Hotel.

== History ==
The origin of the company dates back to 2012, when the founding CEO Kene Mkparu, in collaboration with co-founders and members of the board of directors, became the first beneficiary of the Creative and Entertainment Fund provided by The Bank of Industry, with which they kick-started business in December 2012. Founding directors and senior managers of the company are mostly former cinema management staff of Odeon Cinemas, United Kingdom.

In 2014, the company went into partnership with investment giants African Capital Alliance to finance its long term expansion goals.

In 2018, the board of directors appointed co-founders Kene Okwuosa as Group CEO/Managing Director of Filmhouse Cinemas.

== Filmhouse Cinema ==
This is the film exhibition part of the company and a member on the Board of Trustees of the Cinema Exhibitors Association of Nigeria - CEAN.

After opening with a 3-Screen cinema in December 2012, at Leisure Mall, Surulere, Lagos, the company expanded its flagship cinema to 8 screens in 2016, with 5 additional screens located in the neighboring Adeniran Ogunsanya Mall. Since 2012, they have opened two cinemas in Ibadan (at Dugbe and Samonda), one each in Port Harcourt, Benin, Akure, Kano, Lekki, Oniru and Victoria island in Lagos. The company currently operates 11 cinemas across 6 cities in Nigeria

In 2015, the company partnered with Canadian cine-tech giants IMAX to build the first IMAX theater in West Africa – Filmhouse IMAX, Lekki.

American cine-tech giants Mediamation released a statement in April 2019, announcing their partnership with the company to build the first MX4D theater in West Africa. The technology was unveiled when Filmhouse opened a cinema at Landmark Village, Victoria Island, Lagos in November 2019.
