= List of Nigerian films of 2017 =

This is a list of Nigerian films scheduled for theatrical release in 2017.

== 2017 ==
=== January–March ===
Opening		Title	Director	Cast	Genre	Studio	Ref.
F E B R U A R Y	10	The Royal Hibiscus Hotel	Ishaya Bako	Zainab Balogun; Kenneth Okolie; Deyemi Okanlawon; Joke Silva; Olu Jacobs; Jide Kosoko	Comedy film	EbonyLife Films	
F E B R U A R Y	24	American Driver	Moses Inwang	Evan King; Jim Iyke; Nse Ikpe Etim; Ayo Makun; Emma Nyra; Nadia Buari	Comedy film	Sneeze Films	
M A R C H	23	Sudani from Nigeria	Zakariya	Soubin Shahir; Samuel Abiola Robinson	Comedy and Drama	E4 Entertainment	

=== April–June ===
Opening		Title	Director	Cast	Genre	Studio	Ref.
A P R I L	2	Sobi's Mystic	Biodun Stephen	Bolaji Ogunmola; Kunle Remi; Mofe Duncan	Romantic Drama	ShutterSpeed Projects	
A P R I L	8	Lotanna	Toka McBaror	Liz Benson; Victor Olaotan; Chris Okagbue; Ama Abebrese	Drama	decor studio	
J U N E	16	Isoken	Jadesola Osiberu	Dakore Akande; Joseph Benjamin; Funke Akindele; Marc Rhys	Romantic Drama	Silverbird Distributions; Evrit Film	
J U N E	17	10 Days in Sun City	Adze Ugha	Ayo Makun; Adesuwa Etomi; Richard Mofe-Damijo; Mercy Johnson; 2Baba	Comedy Drama	Silverbird Distributions	

=== October–December ===
Opening		Title	Director	Cast	Genre	Studio	Ref.
N O V E M B E R	24	Christmas is Coming	Ufuoma McDermott	Chioma Chukwuka; Deyemi Okanlawon; Zack Orji; Mary Lazarus	Romantic comedy	Silverbird Distribution Company	
D E C E M B E R	15	The Wedding Party 2	Niyi Akinmolayan	Sola Sobowale; Patience Ozokwor; Adesua Etomi; Banky Wellington	romantic comedy-drama film	Koga Studios	

== More ==
- Bariga Sugar
- A Hotel Called Memory
- Affairs of the Heart
- Tiwa's Baggage
- Tough Love

== See also ==
- 2017 in Nigeria
- List of Nigerian films
