= The Accidental Spy (2017 film) =

2017 Nigerian Crime comedy film

- Directed by: Roger Russell
- Screenplay by: Darlington Abuda
- Produced by: Darlington Abuda; Nicola A. Gregory
- Starring: Ayo Makun; Ramsey Nouah; Christine Allado; Daniel Eghan; Agatha Ezzedine; Miguel A. Núñez Jr. Emmanuel Edunjobi
- Cinematography: Akpe Ododoru
- Edited by: Patrick Odjegba
- Music by: Kolade Morakinyo
- Production companies: 2hotfilms Peekaboo Productions
- Distributed by: FilmOne Distribution
- Release date: 1 December 2017
- Running time: 104 min
- Country: Nigeria
- Language: English

The Accidental Spy is a 2017 Nigerian crime comedy film directed by Roger Russell and produced by Darlington Abuda with Nosa Aghayere Dag as its executive producer. The film stars Ayo Makun, Ramsey Nouah, Henry Morris, Agatha Ezzedine, Miguel A. Núñez Jr. Alibaba Akpobome and Daniel Eghan. It was released on December 1, 2017 and premiered on Netflix on November 29, 2019.

== Plot ==
The theme of the film revolves around an IT specialist Emmanuel Prince, who takes a trip to America to refocus his energy after his girlfriend cheated on him. While in America, the Chairman, a very powerful cartel leader hires a professional assassin to kill the inventor of a new energy source which is affecting the cartel markets. Emmanuel inadvertently becomes involved in the whole affair by signing up for a reality show and mistakenly assumes the identity of the assassin, thereby creating massive confusion and ultimately saving the life of the inventor.

== Cast ==
- Christine Allado as Beverly
- Judith Akuta as Sandra
- Dan Allen as Armed Police Officer
- Steve Broad as FBI Director Shane Glower
- Ayemere Caleb as David
- Emmanuel Edunjobi as James
- Daniel Eghan as Agent
- Agatha Ezzedine as PA of Shane Glower
- Elma Godwin as Doctor Adu
- Andi Jashy as Cop 1
- Mark Knight as Armed police officer
- Vladimira Krckova as Journalist
- Matthew Leonhart as Tech Guy
- Ayo Makun as John
- Simon Maroulis as Armed Policeman Phillip (as Simon Green)
- Henry Morris as Cop
- Thenjiwe Moseley as Self
- Ramsey Nouah as Manny
- Miguel A. Núñez Jr. as The Viper
- Steve Owles as Steve
- Jonah Ripley as Armed Police Officer
- David Savizon as Delivery Agent
- Michael Lumb as Embassy Guest (uncredited)
- Alibaba Akpobome
