= Christmas in Miami =

Nigerian 2021 comedy film

- Directed by: Robert Peters
- Produced by: Ayo Makun
- Starring: Ayo Makun, Kent Morita, John Amos, Nadya Marie, Barry Piacente, Catherine Olsen, Osita Iheme, Richard Mofe-Damijo and IK Ogbonna
- Production company: Ayo Makun's Studio
- Release date: December 24, 2021
- Country: Nigeria
- Language: English

Christmas in Miami is a Nigerian comedy film released on December 24, 2021, and directed by Robert Peters.

== Cast ==
The lead cast of the film includes

- Ayo Makun as Akpos
- Kent Morita as Jo Chan
- John Amos as Chief Host
- Nadya Marie as Eva Silva
- Barry Piacente as Harry Chase
- Catherine Olsen as Lucy Chase
- Osita Iheme as Raphael
- Richard Mofe-Damijo as Dafe
- IK Ogbonna as Nite Club PR.

== Production ==
The film was produced by Akpos Franchise, Ayo Makun's studio, and it has been watched at 61 locations with 49,000 viewers.

== Box office ==
According to the Cinema Exhibitors Association of Nigeria (CEAN), ₦100 million has been made from the movie within the first week of its release.

== See also ==
- 30 Days in Atlanta
- A Trip to Jamaica
