= Kene Okwuosa =

Nigerian film producer and distributor

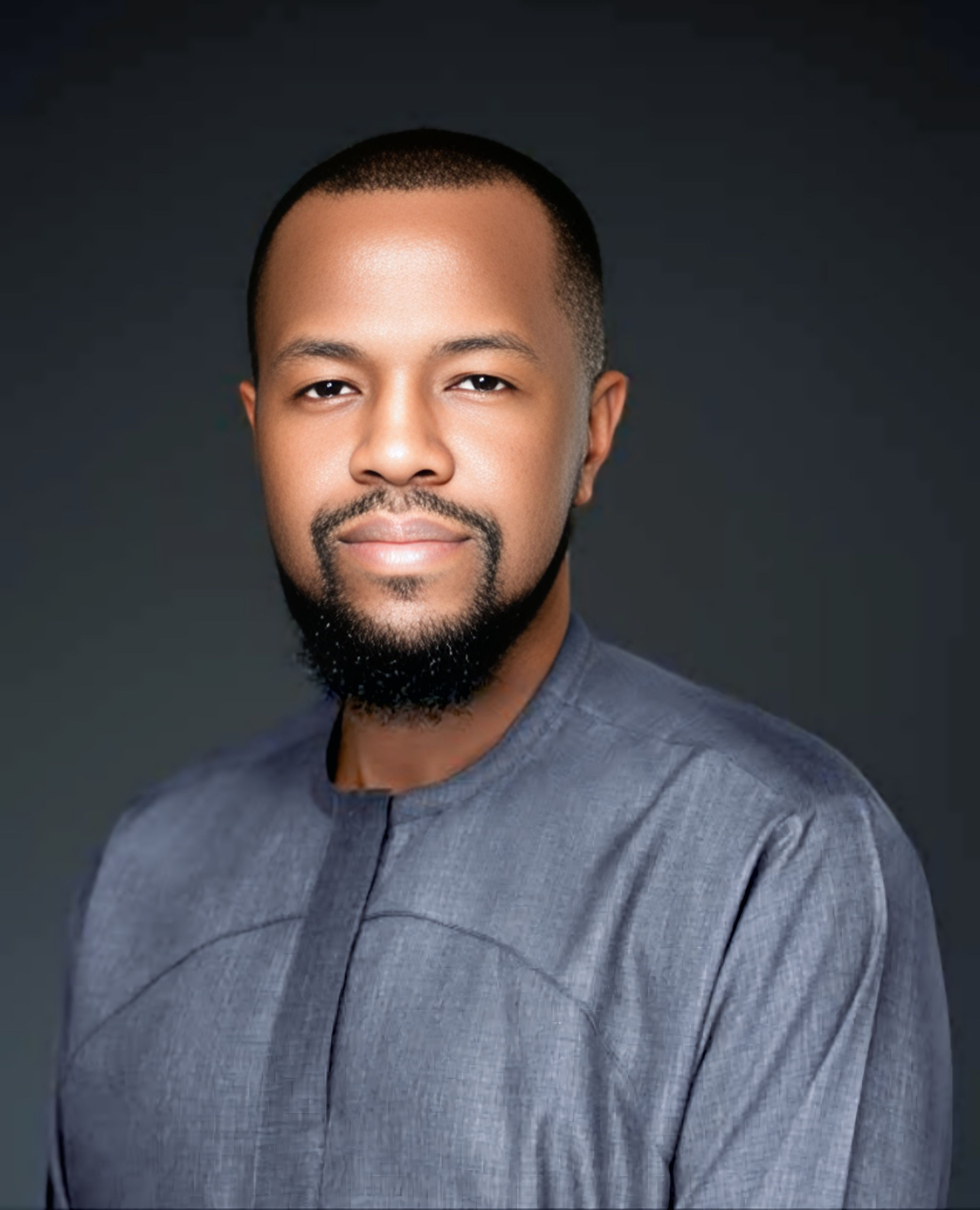
- Kene Okwuosa, 2025
- Born: Nigeria
- Education: London Metropolitan University
- Occupation: Film producer
- Organization: Filmhouse Group

Kene Okwuosa is a Nigerian Film producer and chief executive officer of Filmhouse Group which house the Filmhouse Cinemas, FilmOne Entertainment and FilmOne Studios. He is a member of the Nigerian Official Selection Committee for the Academy Awards.

Okwuosa is the distributor of Wedding Party which grossed N452 million and Funke Akindele's A Tribe Called Judah, which grossed N1.4 billion.

== Filmhouse cinema ==
Kene Okwuosa and his partner co-founded Filmhouse Cinema in 2012, after accessing the Intervention Funds created by President Goodluck Jonathan to boost Nigeria's creative industry. With an initial loan of N200 million, they opened their first three-screen cinema in Surulere, Lagos. Following a slow start, the cinema grew to become one of the biggest locations in the country, leading to further expansion. Today, Filmhouse represents about 50% of tickets sold in Nigerian cinemas and aims to become a leading media entertainment company.

In 2018, Okwuosa became the managing director of Filmhouse Cinemas following the exit of Kene Mkparu.

== Selected filmography ==
- The Wedding Party
- Kambili: The Whole 30 Yards
- The Wedding Party 2
- Merry Men 2
- The Set Up
- Quam's Money
- Moms at war
- The Ghost and the Tout Too
- Sanitation Day (2021)
- When Love Happens (2014)
