= The Wedding Party 2 =

2017 Nigerian romantic comedy drama film

The Wedding Party 2: Destination Dubai
- Film poster
- Directed by: Niyi Akinmolayan
- Screenplay by: Naz Onuzo
- Produced by: Priscilla Nwanah; Temidayo Abudu; Tope Oshin; Naz Onuzo
- Starring: Sola Sobowale; Banky Wellington; Adesua Etomi; Enyinna Nwigwe; Patience Ozokwor; Richard Mofe Damijo; Iretiola Doyle; Somkele Iyamah; Alibaba Akpobome; Zainab Balogun; Daniella Down
- Cinematography: Malcolm McLean
- Edited by: Victoria Akujobi
- Music by: Dr. Bayo Adepetun
- Production companies: Ebonylife TV; FilmOne; Inkblot Productions; Koga Studios
- Distributed by: FilmOne Distributions
- Release date: 15 December 2017
- Country: Nigeria
- Languages: English; Yoruba; Igbo
- Budget: ₦300 million
- Box office: ₦500,000,000

The Wedding Party 2: Destination Dubai is a 2017 Nigerian romantic comedy drama film directed by Niyi Akinmolayan. It is a sequel to The Wedding Party, which was released in December 2016. Principal photography for the film, which was shot in Lagos and Dubai, began in May 2017. It ranks among the highest-grossing Nigerian films of all time.

== Plot ==
Dozie's elder brother, Nonso, continues his romance with Deirdre, Dunni's bridesmaid. Nonso takes Deirdre on a date in Dubai and accidentally proposes marriage to her. After a disastrous traditional engagement ceremony in Lagos, Nonso's family and Deirdre's aristocratic British family reluctantly agree to a wedding in Dubai.

== Cast ==
- Enyinna Nwigwe as Nonso Onwuka
- Daniella Down as Deirdre Winston
- Adesua Etomi as Dunni Onwuka
- Banky Wellington as Dozie Onwuka
- Sola Sobowale as Mrs. Tinuade Coker
- Alibaba Akpobome as Engineer Bamidele Coker
- Richard Mofe Damijo as Chief Felix Onwuka
- Iretiola Doyle as Lady Obianuju Onwuka
- Somkele Iyamah-Idhalama as Yemisi Disu
- Ikechukwu Onunaku as Sola
- Zainab Balogun as Wonu
- Beverly Naya as Rosie
- Afeez Oyetoro as Ayanmale
- Chiwetalu Agu as family elder
- Patience Ozokwor as Nonso's aunt
- Chigul as immigration officer
- Seyi Law as custom officer
- Kunle Idowu as Harrison
- Jumoke George as Iya Michael
- Regan Tetlow as the British MC

== Production ==
The film had a production cost of ₦300 million, excluding publicity.

Released on 15 December 2017, the film grossed over ₦500 million within six weeks of its theatrical release, making it one of the highest-grossing Nollywood films.

== See also ==
- List of highest-grossing Nigerian films
- List of Nigerian films of 2017
