= CREETIQ =

- Website type: Review aggregator
- Website: creetiq.com
- Commercial: Yes
- Registration: Free/subscription
- Current status: Online

CREETIQ is a review aggregator website for African film, TV shows, music and literature. The platform offers a brief excerpt of each review curated with a backlink to the originating source of the review. CREETIQ's algorithm appraises each review based on the scores given by each critic, or a score is assigned by in-house editors. The first movie aggregated on the website was Ayo Makun's A Trip to Jamaica.

In 2019, writer and critic, Edwin Okolo criticised the CREETIQ platform as "...being review site for all forms of media with a snazzy design build and ambitions but didn't really allow for growth of these writers". He also compared CREETIQ to a new review platform, The Lagos Review, started by published writers such as Dami Ajayi and Toni Kan, predicting that if they can learn from the flaws of CREETIQ, they would be successful.

== CREETIQ Score ==
CREETIQ offers its users the information needed to make data-driven decisions based on an aggregate of critical reviews summed up by a calculated score known as the CREETIQ Score. The CREETIQ score is a weighted average that is adjusted by the addition of a statistical value. The colors Green, Yellow or Red are used to summarize the weighted average of a review.

The range includes;

Indication	Score Range
Generally favourable/Good	7.0 - 10.0
Average/Mixed Reactions	5.0 - 6.9
Generally unfavorable/Poor	0.0 - 4.9

== The Critic Challenge ==
An annual call for critics called The Critic Challenge was organized by CREETIQ in April, 2017. This challenge tagged “rewriting the African narrative” which aimed at appreciating the invaluable contributions of critics to the development of the creative and cultural industry in Africa was also birthed due to the neglect of critiquing in the cultural economics in Africa. Olayinka Yomi-Joseph, Ifeoluwa Olujuyigbe and Oluwadeaduramilade Tawak emerged as winner, first and second runners-up in The Critic Challenge 2017.

== See also ==
- Rating site
- Internet Movie Database (IMDb)
