= Robert O. Peters =

Nigerian film director

Robert Peters
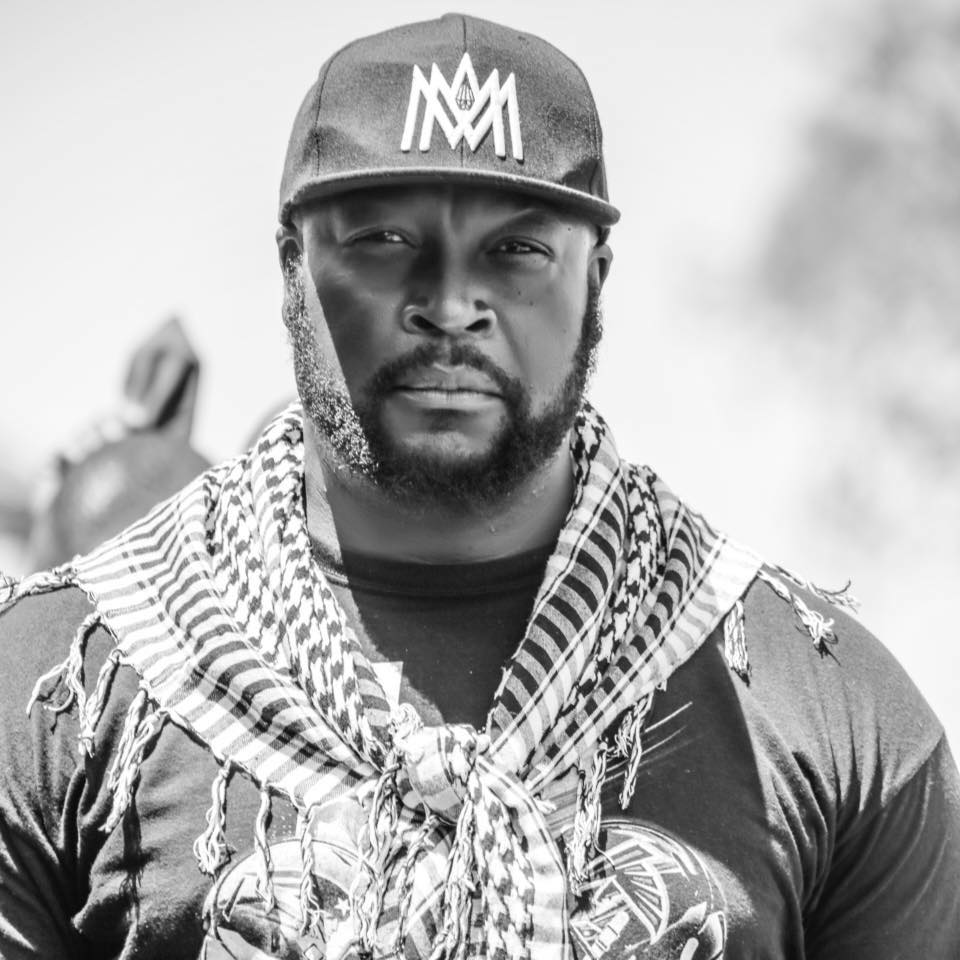
- Robert Peters on the set of A trip to Jamaica
- Born: Robert Oyimemise Peters; 6 June 1973 (age 52); Sabon Gari, Kaduna State, Nigeria
- Occupations: actor, movie producer, director, cinematographer, voice-over artist
- Years active: 1998 – present
- Spouse: Deborah Peters
- Children: 1
- Awards: 2013 Golden Icons Academy Movie Awards for Best Director

Robert Peters sometimes credited as Roberts O. Peters is a Nigerian film producer, director, cinematographer, actor, and occasional voice-over artist. He is best known for directing the 2014 Nollywood breakout movie 30 Days in Atlanta, as well as the movies Shades of Attractions (2015), Boxing Day (2016) and A trip to Jamaica (2016) which featured: Ayo Makun, Ramsey Nouah, Richard Mofe Damijo, Vivica Fox, Dan Davies, Lynn Whitfield, Eric Roberts, Paul Campbell, Funke Akindele, Karlie Redd, Nse Ikpe-Etim, Desmond Elliott, Rasaaq Adoti, and Chet Anekwe amongst others.

== Early life ==
Peters was born in Sabon Gari, Kaduna, Northern Nigeria and is the second of eight children. His parents are Lawrence Adagba and Comfort Peters. He is of Ososo descent and hails from Ososo in the Akoko Edo local government area of Edo State.

Peters began his formal education at St. Gregory Primary School in Kaduna. He attended the University of Jos Nigeria, where he studied Geology and Mining.

== Career ==
Peters began his career as an actor in Nigeria in the 1998 movie Mama Sunday, and went on to play the role of Paul in 2002 in the daytime series Everyday People created by Tajudeen Adepetu. In 2004 he relocated to the US, where he enrolled for a certificate degree in Visual Storytelling hosted by New York University. Peters was then associated with Film Career Connection in Atlanta, which offered him on-the-job training on various film sets across the US. He also enlisted with REDucation a real world training on Red camera and equipment, taught by working professionals, for current and future working professionals.

Peters began working as a cinematographer and film editor in 2006 and worked on a number of African-American Productions. In the space of 10 years, he worked with a number of Hollywood and Nollywood filmmakers including: Vivica A. Fox, Lynn Witfield, Eric Roberts, Karlie Redd, Paul Cambell, Richard Mofe-Damijo, Neville Sajere, Ayo Makun, Ramsey Nuoah, Desmond Elliott, Majid Michel, Jim Iyke, Chris Attoh, Funke Akindele, Oc Ukeje, Jeta Amata, Van Vicker, Nse Ikpe Etim, Lisa Raye McCoy, Mercy Johnson, Stella Damasus, James Michael Costello, Sulehk Sunman, Yvonne Okoro, Carl Anthony Payne, Joseph Benjamin and Tangi Miller.

In 2014, it was reported that the comedy film, 30 Days in Atlanta, directed by Peters, was the highest-grossing film of all time at the Nigerian box office. The movie was also featured in the 2017 Guinness Book of Records as one of the films with the highest domestic gross in the territories of Bollywood, Nollywood and Hollywood, listed alongside PK (from Bollywood) and Star Wars: The Force Awakens (from Hollywood).

== Personal life ==
Peters is married to Deborah Peters and they have a son Zachary Lawrence Onafa-Orafa Peters. They own and run Whitestone Pictures LLC, a film production studio and equipment provider based in Lawrenceville, Georgia.

== Awards and recognition ==
Year	Award	Category	Film	Result
2010	Nafca Awards	Best Cinematography	Immoral Affairs	Won
2012	Nafca Awards	Best Cinematography	Silence Total	Won
2013	Golden Icons Academy Movie Awards	Best Director	Faces Of Love	Won
2015	Nafca Awards	Best film	Affairs of the heart	Won
2015	Golden Icons Academy Movie Awards	Best Film	Affairs of the heart	Won
2015	Golden Icons Academy Movie Awards	Best Director	Affairs of the heart	Won
2015	Best of Nollywood Awards	Best Comedy	30 Days In Atlanta	Won
2015	African Academy Movie Awards AMAA 2015	Best Comedy	30 Days In Atlanta	Won
2015	Golden Icons Academy Movie Awards	Best Comedy	30 Days In Atlanta	Won
2016	2016 AMVCA (Africa Magic Viewers Choice Awards)	Best Cinematography	Refugees	Nominated
2016	African Academy Movie Awards AMAA	Best film made by African living Abroad	Boxing Day	Nominated

== Filmography ==
Feature Films

Year	Title	Notes	Role	Type
2009	Black November	Directed by Jeta Amata	Actor	Feature Film
2011	Le Silence Pure	French/English Movie	Cinematographer/Director	Feature Film
2012	Black Money	A Vogue entertainment production	Director/DP	Feature Film
2012	Reflections	Directed by Desmond Elliot and shot in Sierra Leone	Cinematographer	Feature Film
2013	Refugees	Yvonne Nelson, Belinda Effah, Diana Yekinni, Sandra Don Dufe, Ross Fleming, David Chin	Cinematographer	Feature Film, nominated for Best Cinematography at the 2016 AMVCA
2013	Shrink Wrap	NBC USA Series (One purpose production)	Lead Cinematographer	Feature Film
2013	Faces of Love	Starring Monica Swaida, Raz Adotti, Syr Law	Directed by Robert Peters	Feature Film
2013	Knocking on Heaven's Door	Royal Art Academy Lagos, Production	Lead Cinematographer	Feature Film
2013	Lies men tell 1&2			feature film
2014	30 Days In Atlanta	Starring Ayo Makun, Ramsey Nouah, Richard Mofe Damijo, Vivica Fox, Mercy Johnson, Rachel Oniga, Karlie Redd, Majid Michel and Lynn Whitfield	Director	Feature Film
2014	Affairs of The Heart	"Nevada Bridge Production" Starring Stella Damasus, Joseph Benjamin, Beverly Naya, Monica Swaida	Director	Feature Film
2015	Carpe Diem	DSTV Africa Magic's Original film	Director	Feature Film
2015	The Dowry Man	DSTV Africa Magic's Original film	Director	Feature Film
2015	Boxing Day	A Gifted Gift Studios Production; starring Razaaq Adoti, Richard Mofe Damijo, Joseph Benjamin, Yvonne Okoro, Tangi Miller, Wistina Taylor, Carl Payne, Ikenna Obi	Director	Feature Film
2015	Shades of Attraction	Post-production; "Nevada Bridge Production" OC Ukeje, Richard Mofe Damijo, Ernestine Johnson, Desmond Elliott, Van Vicker, Tasia Grant	Director	Feature Film
2016	A Trip to Jamaica	Post-production	Director	Feature Film
2016	Closure	Post-production	Director	Feature Film
2016	Lagos Blues	Pre-production	Director	Feature Film
2018	Esohe		Director	
2020	Voiceless			feature film
2020	Small Chops			feature film
2021	Christmas in Miami		Director	
2024	Hijack '93		Director	

== See also ==
- List of Nigerian film producers
