= The Royal Hibiscus Hotel =

2017 film

- Film poster
- Directed by: Ishaya Bako
- Written by: Ishaya Bako
- Starring: Zainab Balogun
- Release dates: 8 September 2017 (TIFF); 10 February 2018 (Nigeria)
- Country: Nigeria
- Language: English

The Royal Hibiscus Hotel is a 2017 Nigerian comedy film directed by Ishaya Bako. It was screened in the Contemporary World Cinema section at the 2017 Toronto International Film Festival.

== Synopsis ==
In London, after completing her training as a chef, Ope is unable to find funding to open a restaurant. She decides to return to her parents' home in Nigeria, where they run a once-successful hotel. Ope plans to work there as the chef. However, the hotel is no longer doing well, and her father, Segun, has agreed to sell it to wealthy investors, Deji and Martin. Neither his wife, Rose, nor their daughter Ope knows about the sale. Before the deal is completed, Deji visits the hotel and meets Ope without knowing that she is the owners' daughter.

== Cast ==
- Zainab Balogun as Ope
- Kenneth Okolie as Deji
- Deyemi Okanlawon as Martin
- Joke Silva as Augustina
- Olu Jacobs as Richard
- Jide Kosoko as Chief Segun Adeniyi
- Racheal Oniga as Rose Adeniyi
- Kemi Lala Akindoju as Chika
- Ini Dima-Okojie as Joyce
- Toni Tones as Esther
- Charles Inojie as Chef
- O.C. Ukeje as Felix
- Akah Nnani as Tobem

== Critical reception ==
Upon the premiere of The Royal Hibiscus Hotel at the 2017 Toronto International Film Festival, review aggregating website CREETIQ rated the film 5.3/10 citing mixed reviews from 2 critics. Courtney Small of Cinema Axis opined that "Though The Royal Hibiscus Hotel will no doubt find an audience with die-hard rom-com fans, those looking for a more well-rounded experience will be somewhat disappointed" while Chelsea Phillips-Carr (Pop Matters) was more receptive of the film further stating that "The Royal Hibiscus Hotel proves that playing within a genre doesn't have to result in a mediocre film."

Film Scriptic scored the movie 46%, with a grade D. Isedehi Aigbogun highlights its pros and cons, with a concluding statement: "...TIFF screened this movie in 2017...out of charity and a huge dose of networking"

== See also ==
- List of Nigerian films of 2017
