= Ikenna Obi =

Nigerian actor and film producer (born 1976)

Ikenna Louis Obi
- Born: 27 December 1976 (age 48); Lagos, Lagos State, Nigeria
- Citizenship: Nigerian
- Occupation: Actor
- Awards: 2013 5th BEFFTA Awards

Ikenna Louis Obi (born 27 December 1976) is a Nigerian actor and film producer. He appeared in Shameful Deceit, for which he won Best Actor in a Supporting Role at the 5th BEFFTA UK Awards.

== Early life ==
Obi was born on 27 December 1976 in Lagos, the last of four children. His father became ill and died at a young age.

== Career ==
Attended City Academy Drama School in London.

== Filmography ==
Year	Film	Role	Notes
2012	International Games & International Attack 1 &2	Actor	with Jackie Appiah & Rita Nzelu
2013	Shameful Deceit	Actor (David)	with Eleanor Agala, Theodora Ibekwe & Collins Archie-Pearce
2014	The Soul	Actor	with Eric Atta, Christiana Awotayo
2015	The Perfect Man		Directed by Olamide Oyelade
2015	Boxing Day	Actor (Pastor)	with Razaaq Adoti, Joseph Benjamin, Richard Mofe-Damijo & Yvonne Okoro
2015	Nana means King	Associate Producer	
2016	Flight by Night	Associate Producer	with Daniel Dahdah, Nana Obiri-Yeboah, & Sarah Ofori-Mensah

== Awards and nominations ==
Year	Award	Category	Film	Result
2013	5th BEFFTA Awards	Best Actor in a Supporting role	Shameful Deceit	Won
