= Juwanna Mann =

- Theatrical release poster
- Directed by: Jesse Vaughan
- Written by: Bradley Allenstein
- Produced by: James G. Robinson; Bill Gerber
- Starring: Miguel A. Núñez Jr. Vivica A. Fox; Kevin Pollak; Tommy Davidson; Kim Wayans; Ginuwine; Kimberly "Lil' Kim" Jones
- Cinematography: Reynaldo Villalobos
- Edited by: Seth Flaum
- Music by: Wendy & Lisa
- Production company: Morgan Creek Productions
- Distributed by: Warner Bros. Pictures
- Release date: June 21, 2002
- Running time: 91 minutes
- Country: United States
- Language: English
- Budget: $15 million
- Box office: $13.8 million

Juwanna Mann is a 2002 American sports comedy-drama film directed by Jesse Vaughan, written by Bradley Allenstein, and produced by Bill Gerber. The film stars Miguel A. Núñez Jr., Vivica A. Fox, Kevin Pollak, Tommy Davidson, Kim Wayans, Ginuwine, and Kimberly "Lil' Kim" Jones. Its plot follows a basketball star who poses as female in order to join women's basketball after being suspended from men's basketball. Filming was done in Charlotte, North Carolina at the Charlotte Coliseum and the Independence Arena. Its soundtrack features music by Diana Ross, James Brown, Mystikal, Ginuwine, Lil' Kim and Stevie Wonder, and its score was composed by Wendy & Lisa.

Juwanna Mann was released in the United States on June 21, 2002, by Warner Bros. Pictures. The film's title is a play on a phrase: "You want a man?"

== Plot ==
Jamal Jeffries is a basketball star whose undisciplined on-and-off-court antics have earned him a bad reputation in the basketball community. Jamal is dropped from his team, the Charlotte Beat and suspended indefinitely after he strips naked in protest of being removed from a game. His agent Lorne Daniels is unsuccessful at finding him a new team and decides to cut Jamal as a client. Consequently, without a team or agent, Jamal's life goes downhill: his endorsements and sponsors drop him, he ends up bankrupt due to his lavish and unnecessary spending, his belongings are repossessed, his mansion is foreclosed on, and his girlfriend Tina, who only put up with his antics for his money and fame, walks out on him.

Now broke, jobless, homeless, and deprived of his career and fortune, Jamal goes to live with his no-nonsense Aunt Ruby, the only woman that is willing to put up with Jamal in spite of his outrageous antics. Lacking any other sort of skills, he decides to dress up as a woman named "Juwanna Mann" to play for the Charlotte Banshees of the WUBA (a fictionalized version of the WNBA). Aunt Ruby reluctantly agrees to help her nephew with his charade as does Lorne, who has no choice but to help out after Jamal reveals himself to be Juwanna. In a scene involving the team physical, Jamal has to disguise himself as the team mascot in order to avoid being found out by the team physician.

As Juwanna, Jamal quickly becomes a star on the court, and his overall attitude changes drastically as well. He learns to play with a team rather than just himself. While becoming successful with the Banshees, Jamal also finds himself in a problematic relationship with his teammate Michelle, whom he has romantic feelings for but cannot act on because Michelle knows him only as her confidante, Juwanna. His situation is further complicated as Michelle is involved in a romantic relationship with rapper Romeo (who ends up cheating on her) while Jamal (as Juwanna) is busy warding off the advances of Romeo's aggressively amorous sidekick Puff Smokey Smoke.

Eventually, Jamal is given a chance to return to the men's league, but the hearing takes place at the same time as the Banshees' first playoff game. After much debate, Jamal sticks with the Banshees and helps them win by dunking the winning basket and shattering the backboard. However, he accidentally drops his wig, revealing his true identity, and is immediately fired from the team. Consequently, the Banshees, devastated at the revealed deception, begin to suffer on the court as a result.

Seeing this, Jamal decides to try to make things right again, and enters the Banshees' locker room during another game's halftime to apologize for his deception, and tell them that playing with them had changed his views and attitude about basketball, women, and life in general. His ex-teammates (especially Michelle) are initially still furious at him, but ultimately end up accepting Jamal's genuine apology, which also inspires the team to win the playoffs and eventually the WUBA championship.

Afterwards, Jamal is called in for a hearing with the UBA's commission board. Despite the genuine apology and assurance by himself and Lorne that he has changed for the better, the board is still unimpressed due to the "Juwanna Mann scandal", and it initially appears that Jamal's playing career is truly over. In the nick of time, however, his former WUBA teammates show up and successfully vouch for him to be brought back into the league, and Michelle gives him a championship ring and a kiss. Jamal is then reinstated into the UBA and returns to action with the Charlotte Beat, a better player and a better man.

== Cast ==
- Miguel A. Núñez Jr. as Jamal Jefferies / Juwanna Mann
- Vivica A. Fox as Michelle Langford
- Kevin Pollak as Lorne Daniels
- Kim Wayans as Latisha Jansen
- Ginuwine as Romeo
- Lil' Kim as Tina Parker
- Tommy Davidson as Puff Smokey Smoke
- J. Don Ferguson as UBA Referee
- Jenifer Lewis as Aunt Ruby
- Annie Corley as Coach Rivers
- Tammi Reiss as Vickie Sanchez
- Heather Quella as Magda Rowonowitch
- Itoro Coleman as Debbie Scruggs
- Rasheed Wallace as Whitley
- Vlade Divac as Morse
- Dikembe Mutombo as Coyner
- Muggsy Bogues as Andrew Stewart
- Ric Reitz as Beat coach
- Omar Dorsey as Rickey

Cynthia Cooper, Teresa Weatherspoon, Katy Steding, Jeanne Zelasko, Chris Myers, Roy Firestone, Kevin Frazier, Kenny Albert, and Jay Leno appear as themselves.

== Production ==
Writer Bradley Allenstein initially got the idea for the film when he was watching a WNBA game and imagined it would be funny to have a man in drag play basketball with them. The character of Juwanna Mann was named after a real life girlfriend of one of his friends whose name was Juwanna. Allenstein pitched the concept to producer Steve Oedekerk, who then presented it to Warner Brothers. Director Jesse Vaughn joined the project shortly after.

Production on the film was announced in August 1998. Portions of the movie were filmed at the home of the Curry Family. 11-year-old Seth Curry also briefly appeared in one of the early scenes, playing basketball with other children.

== Soundtrack ==
- "Fame" – L.T. Hutton (opening credits song)
- "What's Luv?" – Fat Joe ft. Ashanti (end credits song, with film scenes featured in the track's music video)

== Reception ==
Juwanna Mann was received poorly by critics, earning a 9% rating on Rotten Tomatoes. The site's consensus reads, "With its tired premise, Juwanna Mann's jokes fall flat." On Metacritic, the film has a rank of 24 out of 100 based on 25 critics, indicating "generally unfavorable reviews".

Anna Smith of Empire Magazine wrote, "There may be a lot of boobs out there on the court, but there's only one tit. As limp as it is lazy." The film received a "D" from Owen Gleiberman of Entertainment Weekly, who added, "A Tootsie-role sports farce that's a drag in every which way."

Chicago Tribune's Robert K. Elder called the film "tempting to call traveling", but added that "it never goes anywhere." Ann Hornaday of The Washington Post had nothing more to add other than calling the film "Tired and flat as a dead basketball", while Carla Meyer of the San Francisco Chronicle deemed it a "misguided comedy".

Ed Gonzalez of Slant was rather shocked by the PG-13 rating of the film. He stated, "Though significantly less crass and offensive than Sorority Boys, [the film] is rated PG-13 for 'Lil' Kim's booty not included.'"

Dennis Harvey of Variety called Juwanna Mann a "cross-dressing yokfest", comparing it to such films as Charley's Aunt, Some Like It Hot and Tootsie.

According to A.O. Scott of The New York Times, "even though, most of the time, you know exactly what will happen next … you don't much mind. Nor do the many plot holes and improbabilities … undermine its silly, raucous spirit."

The film was largely panned in the UK, where the BBC's Jamie Russell stated: "This mess of a movie is nothing short of a travesty of a transvestite comedy."

== See also ==
- List of basketball films
- Cross-dressing in film and television
