= Jumoke George =

Nigerian actress

- Born: Olajumoke Amoke Olatunde George; 18 February
- Citizenship: Nigerian
- Occupations: Actress; film producer; filmmaker
- Notable work: The Wedding Party

Olajumoke Amoke Olatunde George commonly known as Jumoke George is a Nigerian actress, film producer and filmmaker.

She has acted in both Yoruba and English language films in Nollywood and has hosted television programs in Nigeria.

== Early life and education ==
George was born on 18 February. She hails from Ibadan, Oyo state. Her father was in the Nigerian military while her stepmother was a nurse who also works for the military.

George's mother and father separated while she was very young, with George remaining with her father and stepmother. After having disputes with her stepmother, her father threw George out of the house while she was in secondary school. So, George then sheltered with friends.

George attended Command Children School Ann's Barracks Yaba, Lagos; the Army Children School Kano; the Anglican Grammar School, Orita mefa, Ibadan. George went to Government Technical College, Osogbo where she studied Business Administration.

== Career ==
George was introduced to acting at age eight by a family friend. She did stage drama with National Television Authority (NTA), Ibadan. She enrolled in a drama troupe at NTA Ibadan. Under the sponsorship of Victor Ashaolu, George entered the Yoruba movie industry.

After an inability to progress in the film industry, George became a member of the Freelance and Independent Broadcasters Association of Nigeria (FIBAN). George anchored 5 live programs which kept her very busy as away from acting.

== Filmography ==
- Eekan soso (2009)
- The Wedding Party (2016) - Iya Michaels
- My Wife & I (2017) - Aunty Ayo
- The Wedding Party 2 (2017) - Iya Michael
- The Ghost and the Tout (2018)
- King of Boys (2018) - Party Gossip 1
- Mokalik (2019) - Iya Simi
- Saheed Esu (2020) - Iya Jamiu
- Love Castle (2021) - Iyaloja
- What Happened At St James (2021)
- Maleeka (2022) - Mama Yeni
- The Carpenter (2022) - Mother
- The Other Side of Love (2023) - Mama Mimiola
- JAPA (2024) - Mrs. Ajayi

== Award ==
City People Movie Matriarch Recognition Award 2018
