= Ikechukwu =

Nigerian singer

- Born: Ikechukwu Onunaku; Manassas, Virginia, United States
- Occupations: Actor; rapper; singer

Ikechukwu Onunaku,// known professionally as Ikechukwu and Killz is a Nigerian actor, rapper, and singer. He was a cast member in The Wedding Party and The Wedding Party 2: Destination Dubai.

== Early life ==
Onunaku was born in Manassas, Virginia to Nigerian parents but was raised in Lagos, Nigeria. He moved to the United States after completing high school at King's College, Lagos. He returned over a decade later to Nigeria shortly before the release of his first album Son of the Soil in 2006 which featured the smash hit My Name is Ikechukwu. Son of the Soil was followed by Life and Times of Killz Volume 1 which featured production by Don Jazzy and an appearance by DBanj and Wande Coal and frequent collaborator Naeto C.

His hit single "My name is Ikechukwu" from the Son of the Soil charted at No.1 in the East, in Lagos and Abuja for 21, 6 and 5 weeks respectively. His third album The Alliance Reconstructed featured other hits like "Critical", and "Now is the Time". His other singles include "Bu Lie Oto, B.A.D.A, Carry Me, Balabala."

He made his debut on the big screen in a short feature written produced and directed by Walter Taylaur's The Wages. It went on to garner critical acclaim, selected for screening at AFRIFF 2014 and subsequently winning best short feature at the AMVCA'S in 2015. Following that with a major appearance in the Ndani-produced Gidi Up, Ikechukwu secured a major role in the blockbuster The Wedding Party in 2016. In 2017, he returned to the cast of the sequel The Wedding Party 2

In 2019, Ikechukwu released another single, Nnukwu Azu.

In September 2019, Ikechukwu made a post on his Instagram page, alleging that he was pulled out of an Uber taxi, bundled into a police van and beaten by the operatives of the Nigerian Police Force. He said that he was taken to an ATM and forced to empty his bank accounts.

Ikechukwu was traditionally married to British model Ella in May 2021. Ikechukwu was engaged to glamour model Sarah Ofili.

== Nominations and awards ==
- Best New Artist in Africa at the 2006 Channel O Spirit of Africa Video Awards.
- Revelation of the Year at 2007's Hip Hop World Awards
- Best Lyricist on the Roll, and Best Rap Collabo with Naeto C for You Know my P at 2008's Hip Hop World Awards
- Best Afro Pop Act of the Year and Best Music Video for Wind Am Well NEA Awards (2008)
- Won best video MTV MAMAS, (2008)
- Won Channel O Best Male, (2008)
- Won Channel O Best Male West Africa (2009)

== Filmography ==
- The Wages (2013) as Rogers
- Gidi Up (2013) as Mo
- Gbomo Gbomo Express (2015) as Nino
- The Wedding Party (2016) as Sola Akinyemi
- The Wedding Party 2: Destination Dubai (2017) as Sola
- When Love Comes Calling (2019)
- Powder Dry (2019)
- The Relationship (2019) as Chinedu
- By All Means (2019)
- Òlòtūré (2019) as Chuks
- Men Money and Marriage (2019)
- Your Excellency (2019) as John
- The Little Black Book (2021) as Leo
- No Way Through (2023) as Christian Ezechime

== Albums ==
- Son of the Soil (2006)
- Life and Times of Killz Vol. 1 (2008)
- The Alliance Reconstructed (2010)
- Hard (2019)
- Soft (2019)

== See also ==
- Special Anti-Robbery Squad#Incidents
