= King of Boys: The Return of the King =

2021 7-part limited series directed by Kemi Adetiba

- Genre: Political crime drama
- Created by: Kemi Adetiba
- Directed by: Kemi Adetiba
- Starring: Sola Sobowale; Toni Tones
- Music by: Tolu Obanro
- Country of origin: Nigeria
- Original languages: English; Igbo; Yoruba; Hausa
- No. of seasons: 1
- No. of episodes: 7

Production
- Producers: Remi Adetiba; Kemi Adetiba; Joy Nnamdi-Yusuf
- Running time: 60 minutes

Original release
- Network: Netflix
- Release: 27 August 2021

Related
- King of Boys

King of Boys: The Return of the King is a television limited series directed by Kemi Adetiba. It was released on 27 August 2021 on Netflix as a sequel to the 2018 Nigerian crime political thriller film, King of Boys. Sola Sobowale and Toni Tones reprise their roles as Eniola Salami with Reminisce, Illbliss, Akin Lewis, Osas Ighodaro and Keppy Ekpenyong also reprising their roles. Additional cast members includes Nse Ikpe-Etim, Richard Mofe Damijo, Efa Iwara, Deyemi Okanlawon and Charly Boy.

== Synopsis ==
The series follows Eniola Salami’s return after 5 years in exile. Not content with the prospect of a fresh start, she immediately resumes her quest to launder her underworld might into legitimate political power—this time aiming even higher than before.

== Cast ==
- Sola Sobowale as Eniola Salami
- Toni Tones as Young Eniola Salami
- Reminisce as Makanaki
- Illbliss as Odogwu Malay
- Akin Lewis as Aare Akinwande
- Osas Ighodaro as Sade Bello
- Titi Kuti as Ade Tiger
- Keppy Ekpeyong as President Mumusa
- Nse Ikpe Etim as First Lady Jumoke Randle
- Richard Mofe-Damijo as Reverend Ifeanyi
- Efa Iwara as Dapo Banjo
- Deyemi Okanlawon as Adetola Fashina
- Charly Boy as Odudubariba
- Bimbo Manuel as Mr. Mogaji
- Taiwo Ajai-Lycett as Chief Mrs Randle
- Lord Frank as Tunde Randle
- Lanre Hassan as Iyaloja

== Episodes ==
No.	Title	Directed by	Written by	Original release date
1	"A King's Welcome"	Kemi Adetiba	Kemi Adetiba	August 27, 2021
After being cleared of all charges, Eniola Salami returns to a hero's welcome in Nigeria. She declares her ambition to become the next governor of Lagos State. She engages in self-flagellation as she accuses herself for the death of her children. She discovers that half of the table members are no longer loyal to her. She visits her children's graves and then engages a crowd telling them that she's no politician but is fit to be governor because she is a product of her own hardwork. Eniola is often interjected by admonishment from her younger self and experiences continuous internal battles. Dapo Banjo, a journalist gets an anonymous tip and convinces his editor, Mr Mogaji to let him write an expose on how Eniola gained her freedom.
2	"A Wounded Lion Is Still a Lion"	Kemi Adetiba	Kemi Adetiba	August 27, 2021
Eniola's campaign is in full swing. She courts reverend Ifeanyi whose endorsement is highly revered. He however refuses Eniola's bribe. She takes her campaign activity to the market women but is ambushed by First Lady Jumoke Randle making her visibly angry. She visits the head of market people, the Iya Oloja who appears to be in support of Governor Randle. Odudubariba in a fit of anger declares that Eniola must acede to him as the new King. Eniola asks Ade Tiger for his opinion about her governorship aspiration; he informs her that her fixation on the election puts them at a loss in their other business as Odudubariba has taken over half the table.
3	"An Old Friend"	Kemi Adetiba	Kemi Adetiba	August 27, 2021
Eniola's campaign team try to convince her to announce upcoming nuptials in order to appear acceptable. This infuriates her. She meets with President Mumusa to ask for his support as his party's gubernatorial candidate and makes it clear that she was instrumental in his election as president. She vows to unseat him if he does not throw his weight behind her. Makanaki resurfaces.
4	"The Devil's Revenge"	Kemi Adetiba	Kemi Adetiba	August 27, 2021
Makanaki kills all his former goons. This is witnessed by 2 neighbourhood kids. The CMP party gubernatorial candidate steps down from the party ticket, leaving Eniola as the front runner. She accepts the party ticket and entertains questions from the press. Dapo Banjo asks why she was pardoned by the president and she denies any personal relationship with the president as her charges were dropped and she was not pardoned. He also asks why she is referred to as the "King of Boys" to which she responds that she came from the streets and will accept any moniker bestowed upon her. Eniola takes a meeting with the First Lady and the meeting ends in deadlock. The First Lady seeks help from Aare and the governors mother. Odogwu questions the boy that witnessed Makanaki's deeds.
5	"Walls Closing In"	Kemi Adetiba	Kemi Adetiba	August 27, 2021
Dapo Banjo interviews inspector Gobir who rebukes him. He goes backed to his office and realises that he missed a parcel bomb by a hair's breath. Odogwu informs Eniola that someone has been going around killing their goons, ransacking their warehouses and impersonating Makanaki. She asks him if Makanaki's body was burnt. Eniola meets up with Mr. Gobir. Dapo's boss tries to convince him to stop chasing the story about Eniola and the president as he was almost killed but Dapo is convinced that he is closing in on the story. Makanaki visits a Babalawo and prays for the defeat of his enemies and to be crowned the King of Boys. Odogwu calls a truce meeting where he declares that a war is being waged against members of the table and suggests that Eniola is too busy with her gubernatorial aspirations. Ade Tiger meets up with a mystery woman who suggests that he worked for the Aare in Eniola's absence and is now a double agent. Eniola attends a table meeting by proxy.
6	"Trouble Sleep..."	Kemi Adetiba	Kemi Adetiba	August 27, 2021
The table resolves to help the president win his reelection and to help Eniola win her gubernatorial seat in exchange for her crown and throne. She attends a debate where the First Lady confronts her and threatens to expose Eniola. Eniola reveals the first lady's past as a prostitute. While at the debate, Eniola's SUV is rigged with a bomb. Makanaki and his goons attack Eniola and the bomb detonates. Ade Tiger frames Boxer for planting the bomb. Eniola stabs Boxer. Eniola pays Aare a surprise visit and presents him Boxer's eyes, leaving him bewildered. Makanaki reveals himself to Odogwu.
7	"A Handover Ritual"	Kemi Adetiba	Kemi Adetiba	August 27, 2021
Odogwu runs home and finds that his family has been killed. Makanaki follows him and kills him. Ade Tiger grants Dapo Banjo a tell-all interview and reveals to Dapo Banjo that he double-crossed her because she does not appreciate loyalty despite their longstanding history. Eniola confronts Reverend Ifeanyi with details from his past and in turn wins his endorsement. In a turn of events, Mr. Mogaji grants a press conference implicating Dapo as being an instrument of the First Lady to hurt Eniola and other opponent's campaign. Dapo confronts Mr. Mogaji. The First Lady is thrown out of the government house. Whilst election results are coming in, Eniola attends a table meeting and Ade Tiger appeared to have turned against Eniola. Eniola pleads to do a proper handover ritual before she gets killed and in a plot twist, she commands Ade Tiger to kill all the table members and presents Makanaki as her successor. Following her election victory, she returns home to felicitations. In a post credits scene, Aare is killed by Makanaki's ninja lady.

== Production and release ==
In September 2020, it was announced that Netflix approved the production of King of Boys 2 as a sequel to the 2018 crime thriller film by Kemi Adetiba and was set to feature the old cast members with some additional cast. It was initially planned as a movie but ended up being made into a television series. A 4-minute teaser of the film was released on 16 September 2020. Filming lasted 3 months and ended on 3 November 2020. The official trailer was released on Monday 16 August 2021. It was released on 27 August 2021 exclusively on Netflix.

Toni Tones used method acting for her role as young Eniola, She had to learn the Yoruba language as a significant proportion of her lines were in the language. She was tutored by Dele Adetiba.

== Reception ==
Sola Sobowale received numerous accolades for her acting in the series. In a review for Pulse Nigeria, Precious Nwogu wrote "'The Return of the King' makes good its promise of nostalgia but struggles through some barely sellable subplots and less endearing characters. The main plot following Eniola's governorship race and power tussle with the Randles is convincing, fresh and sufficiently takes its audience through the seven-episode series." A reviewer for Culture Custodian noted that the subplot surrounding Dapo Banjo and his family was "long and overdrawn" while Makanaki's role as a villain was underplayed. The reviewer however concluded that "Ultimately, The Return of the King is worth the wait!" While the reviewer for KemiFilani News praised Adetiba for her use of lights, shadows and angles saying "Ultimately, a great deal of a film’s tone is reflected by its lighting and KOB; the return of the king scored 100%." the Pulse Nigeria reviewer noted that "'The Return of the King' opts for high-key lighting that strips it of mystery." A Daily Trust reviewer noted that the film was dotted with unnecessarily long scenes as is the usual Nollywood fashion. A reviewer for The Cable praised the acting in the series noting that there was "no overacting or underacting" exempting Titi Kuti and Charly Boy. The reviewer also gave KOB praise for the theme and dialogue but gave low ratings for the plot, musical score, visual and sound effects.
