= King of Boys =

2018 Nigerian film directed by Kemi Adetiba

- Theatrical release poster
- Directed by: Kemi Adetiba
- Written by: Kemi Adetiba
- Produced by: Kemi Adetiba; Kene Okwuosa; Remi Adetiba
- Starring: Sola Sobowale; Adesua Etomi; Reminisce; Toni Tones; Jide Kosoko; Illbliss
- Cinematography: Idowu Adedapo; Olabode Lawal
- Production company: Kemi Adetiba Visuals
- Distributed by: FilmOne Distributions
- Release date: 20 October 2018
- Running time: 169 minutes
- Country: Nigeria
- Languages: English; Yoruba; Igbo; Hausa
- Box office: ₦ 245 million

King of Boys is a 2018 Nigerian political crime thriller film written, co-produced, and directed by Kemi Adetiba. It is the second film directed by Adetiba, following the release of The Wedding Party. The film reunites her with Adesua Etomi and Sola Sobowale, who both appeared in her directorial debut. King of Boys centres on power struggles and features rappers Illbliss and Reminisce in their acting debuts. Other cast members include Paul Sambo, Osas Ighodaro, Toni Tones, Sani Muazu, Demola Adedoyin, and Akin Lewis.

== Synopsis ==
Alhaja Eniola Salami is a businesswoman and philanthropist with a promising political future. She is drawn into a struggle for power, which in turn threatens everything around her as a result of her growing political ambitions. To come out of this on top, she is caught up in a game of trust, not knowing whom she really has to look up to, and this leads to her ruthlessness.

== Cast ==
- Sola Sobowale as Alhaja Eniola Salami
- Adesua Etomi as Kemi Salami
- Jide Kosoko as Alhaji Salami
- Osas Ighodaro as Sade Bello
- Illbliss as Odogwu Malay
- Reminisce as Makanaki
- Toni Tones as Young Salami
- Akin Lewis as Aare Akinwade
- Demola Adedoyin as Kitan Salami
- Sani Mu'azu as Inspector Shehu
- Paul Sambo as Nurudeen Gobir
- Sharon Ooja as Amaka
- Jumoke George as party gossip 1
- Lanre Hassan as Iyaloja

== Reception ==
It was listed among the top 10 films of 2018 by the News Agency of Nigeria (NAN).

=== Box office ===
King of Boys grossed ₦200 million after seven weeks in cinemas and ₦245 million overall.

== Sequel ==
The sequel, The Return of the King was released on 27 August 2021 exclusively on Netflix as a seven-part limited series.

== Awards and nominations ==
Year	Award	Category	Result	Ref
2019	African Movie Academy Awards	Best Actress in a Leading Role - Sola Sobowale	Won	
2019	African Movie Academy Awards	Best Actress in a Supporting Role - Adesua Etomi-Wellington	Won	
2020	2020 Africa Magic Viewers' Choice Awards	Best Supporting Actor - Reminisce	Nominated	
2020	2020 Africa Magic Viewers' Choice Awards	Best Supporting Actress - Toni Tones	Nominated	
2020	2020 Africa Magic Viewers' Choice Awards	Best Costume Designer - Yolanda Okereke	Nominated	
2020	2020 Africa Magic Viewers' Choice Awards	Best Make-Up - Hakeem Effects	Nominated	
2020	2020 Africa Magic Viewers' Choice Awards	Best Actress in a Drama - Sola Sobowale	Nominated	
2020	2020 Africa Magic Viewers' Choice Awards	Best Sound Track - Sess, Reminisce & Adekunle Gold - "Original Gangster"	Nominated	
2020	2020 Africa Magic Viewers' Choice Awards	Best Director - Kemi Adetiba	Nominated	
2021	African Entertainment Awards USA	Best African Movie	Won	

== See also ==
- List of Nigerian films of 2018
- Africa Magic Viewers' Choice Awards
