= What Happened at St James =

- Directed by: Marc Adebesin
- Written by: Frances Okeke
- Produced by: Tosin Akintokun
- Starring: Zack Orji, Femi Branch, Ken Erics, Deyemi Okanlawon and the late Rachel Oniga
- Release date: 2021
- Country: Nigeria
- Language: English

What Happened at St James is a 2021 Nigerian movie produced by Tosin Akintokun, written by Frances Okeke, and directed by Marc Adebesin. The movie stars Zack Orji, Femi Branch, Ken Erics, Deyemi Okanlawon and the late Rachel Oniga.

== Synopsis ==
Three young men are trapped in the consequences of their deeds in secondary school. Their various ways of solving the problems creates suspense throughout the film.

== Premiere ==
The movie was released on November 19 and was premiered nationwide.

== Cast ==
- Zack Orji
- Femi Branch
- Ken Erics
- Deyemi Okanlawon
- Rachel Oniga
- Yemi Sodimu
- Kelechi Udegbe
- Nelly Ejianwu
- Bolaji Ogunmola
- Chimezie Imo
- Damilare Lawal
- Judith Bada
- Chinelo Ejianwu
- Jumoke George
- Chris Iheuwa
- Gregory Ojefua
- Kayode Obayomi
