= Ayo Makun =

Nigerian comedian and actor (born 1971)

A.Y
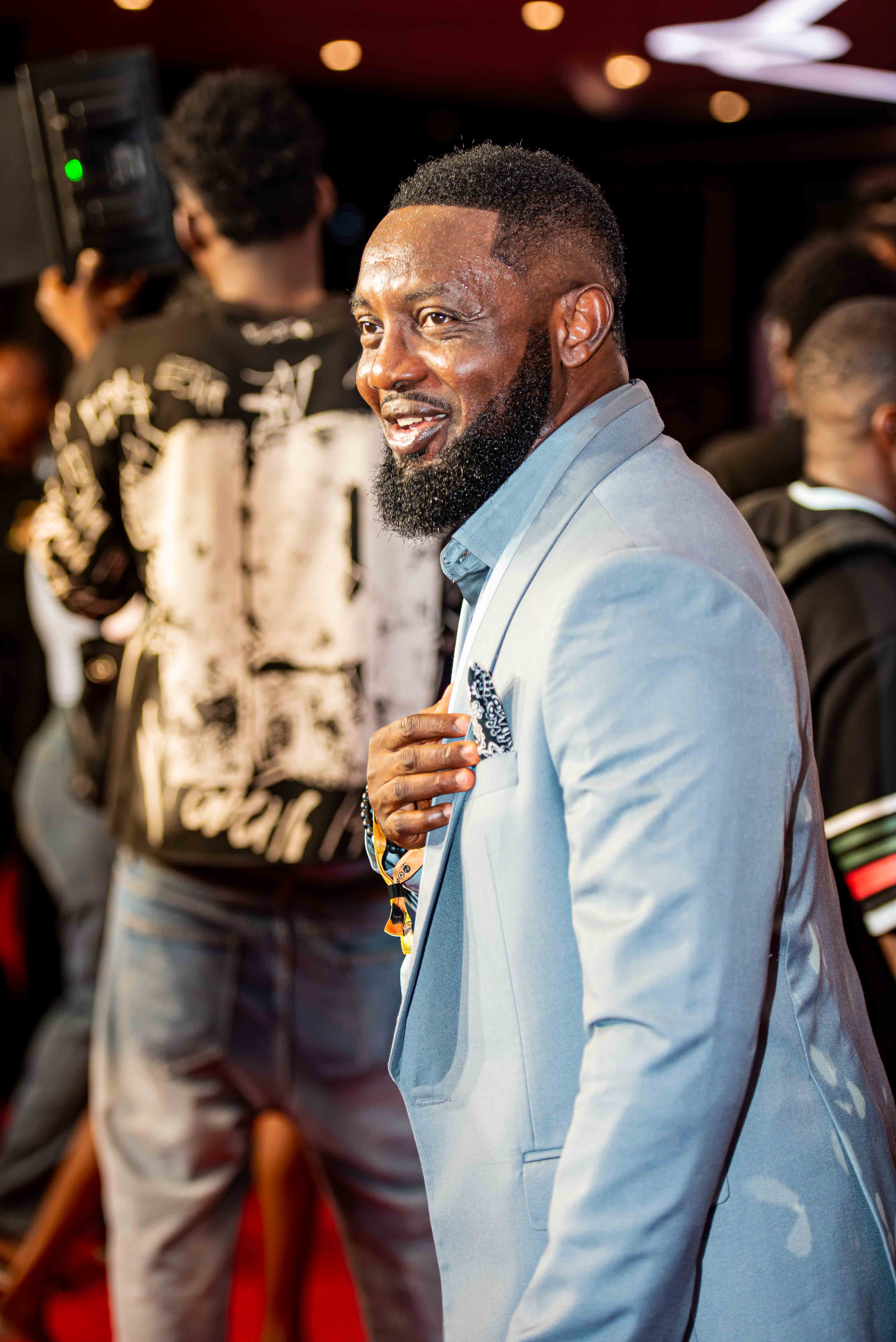
- AY at 2026 AMVCA
- Born: Ayodeji Richard Makun; 19 August 1971 (age 55); Ondo State, Nigeria
- Education: Delta State University
- Occupations: comedian; actor
- Known for: Being Mrs Elliot; AY Live
- Spouse: Mabel Makun (m. 2008)
- Children: 2

Ayodeji Richard Makun (//; born 19 August 1971), professionally known as A.Y, is a Nigerian actor, comedian, radio and television presenter and film director. He is the host of the A.Y live shows and A.Y comedy skits. His debut movie, 30 Days in Atlanta was produced by him and directed by Robert O. Peters. In addition, Makun was appointed a U.N Peace Ambassador in 2009 and is the CEO of Corporate World Entertainment, Nigeria.

== Early life and education ==
Makun was born on 19 August 1971 and hails from Ifon, in Ose Local Government Area of Ondo State. He is the eldest male child in a family of seven. Makun received his education at Delta State University, Abraka, Delta State, Nigeria, and graduated with a degree in theatre arts in 2003, after nine years of study. While a student, Makun was awarded the Jaycee Club Socio-Personality Award, Best Show Business Promoter (2001), Most Celebrated Student on Campus (2001), and Most Fashionable Student on Campus (1999 and 2000).

== Career ==
Makun came into the spotlight while working as Alibaba Akporobome's personal assistant and event manager. He wrote "A.Y wire" as a guest columnist in The Sun (Nigeria) and Gbenga Adeyinka's Laugh Mattaz.

Makun directs and acts in the Nigerian sitcom AY's Crib alongside Alex Ekubo, Venita Akpofure, Buchi Franklin, and Justice Nuagbe. He also hosts comedy shows such as AY Live, which features comedians like Bovi, Helen Paul, and many others. Makun is the CEO of Corporate World entertainment, Nigeria, and also owns a clubhouse. As an investor in stand-up comedy, he launched the AY "Open Mic Challenge," a platform designed to support and showcase emerging comedians.

== Events ==
Makun co-hosted the 2018 Golden Movie Awards Africa with Joselyn Dumas, held at the Movenpick Ambassador Hotel in Accra, Ghana.

== Personal life ==
Makun married his wife, Mabel, in November 2008, and they have two children.

In April 2024, Makun publicly announced the marital separation and subsequent divorce from his wife of 20 years, Mabel Makun, stating that he had lost a 20-year friendship and marriage. Following the dissolution of his marriage, Makun disclosed in an interview that he stopped attending church services because he found church congregations judgmental and unsupportive toward individuals experiencing marital breakdown. He later addressed public speculation regarding his marital status, clarifying in August 2025 that he was not seeking reconciliation with his ex-wife and emphasizing that both parties had moved on independently.

== Awards timeline ==
=== 2008 ===
- Comedian of the Year: Diamond Awards for Comedy
- Comedian of the Year: Teens Favorite
- Comedian of the Year: MBG Abuja Merit Awards
- Comedian of the Year: National Daily Awards
- Comedian of the Year: Arsenal Award for Excellence
- Comedian of the Year: Mode Men of the Year Awards

=== 2009 ===
- U.N Peace Ambassador.

=== 2010 ===
- Comedian of the Year: Nigerian Entertainment Awards

=== 2013 ===
- Most Creative Entrepreneur of the Year, (comedy category): Creative Entrepreneurs Association of Nigeria (CEAN)
- Best Event (A.Y Live): NELAS Awards 2018, United Kingdom

== Filmography ==
Year	Title	Role	Notes
2014	Being Mrs Elliot	Ishawuru	with Omoni Oboli, Sylvia Oluchi and Majid Michel
2014	30 Days in Atlanta	Akpors	with Ramsey Nouah, Lynn Whitfield, Karlie Redd and Richard Mofe Damijo
2016	A Trip to Jamaica	Akpos	also starring Funke Akindele, Eric Roberts, Dan Davies, Chris Attoh
2016	The Wedding Party	MC	also starring Adesua Etomi, Sola Sobowale, Banky W and Richard Mofe Damijo
2016	10 Days in Sun City	Akpos	also starring Adesua Etomi, Mercy Johnson, Richard Mofe Damijo, Falz
2017	American Driver	Ayo Makun	also starring Evan King, Jim Iyke, Anita Chris, Nse Ikpe Etim, Nadia Buari, Emma Nyra, Johnny Dewan, Laura Heuston, McPc the Comedian, Michael Tula, Andie Raven
2017	The Accidental Spy	John	also starring Ramsey Nouah Christine Allado
2017	The Wedding Party 2	MC	also starring Adesua Etomi, Sola Sobowale, Banky W and Richard Mofe Damijo
2018	Merry Men: The Real Yoruba Demons	Ayo Abioritsegbemi	also starring Jim Iyke, Ramsey Nouah, Falz and Richard Mofe Damijo
2019	Merry Men 2	Amaju	also starring, Jim Iyke, Ramsey Nouah, Falz and Damilola Adegbite
2002	Rattlesnake: The Ahanna Story	Timi Phillips	with Ramsey Nouah, Stan Nze, Bucci Franklin
2021	Christmas in Miami	Akpos	also starring, Richard Mofe Damijo, Osita Iheme, Desiree Farnum, Manoj Chandra, Tanya Price, and Kent Morita
2022	Almajiri	Oloye	with Alexx Ekubo, Asabe Madaki
2023	Merry Men 3: Nemesis	Amaju	with Fred Amata, Segun Arinze
2024	Mr Patrick Wahala in America	Prophet	with Chinedu Daniel Acapella, Farheen Barey, Eugene Bernard

== See also ==
- List of Yoruba people
- List of Nigerian comedians
