= Sparks (TV series) =

American sitcom (1996–1998)

- Genre: Sitcom
- Created by: Ed. Weinberger
- Directed by: Wendy Charles Acey; Mark Corry; Stan Daniels; Kim Friedman; Leonard R. Garner Jr. Bob Moloney; Ed. Weinberger
- Starring: James Avery; Miguel A. Nunez Jr. Terrence Dashon Howard; Kym E. Whitley; Arif S. Kinchen; Robin Givens
- Theme music composer: Billy Preston
- Composer: Billy Preston
- Country of origin: United States
- Original language: English
- No. of seasons: 2
- No. of episodes: 40

Production
- Executive producers: Rob Dames; Bob Moloney; Lenny Ripps; Ed. Weinberger
- Producers: Greg Giangregorio; Bruce Bayley Johnson; Miguel A. Núñez Jr. Alison Taylor
- Running time: 22–24 minutes
- Production companies: The Weinberger Company; MTM Enterprises; 20th Century Fox Television

Original release
- Network: UPN
- Release: August 26, 1996 – March 2, 1998

Related
- Good News

Sparks is an American sitcom television series that aired on UPN from August 26, 1996, to March 2, 1998. The series stars James Avery, Robin Givens, Terrence Howard, Miguel A. Núñez Jr., Kym Whitley and Arif S. Kinchen. The sitcom is set in Compton, California, and is about the everyday lives of a family of lawyers running a family-owned law practice. Reruns of the show aired on BET in the late 1990s.

== Content ==
The show stars James Avery as Alonzo Sparks, a lawyer running a family law firm with his sons Maxey (Miguel A. Núñez Jr.) and Greg (Terrence Howard) in inner-city Compton, California.

== Cast ==
=== Main ===
- James Avery as Alonzo Sparks
- Miguel A. Nunez Jr. as Maxey Sparks, Alonzo's first son
- Terrence DaShown Howard as Greg Sparks, Alonzo's second son
- Kym E. Whitley as Darice Mayberry
- Arif S. Kinchen as LaMarr Hicks
- Robin Givens as Wilma Cuthbert

=== Recurring ===
- Wanda-Lee Evans as Judge
- Phill Lewis as Detective Floyd Pitts
- Hawthorne James as Claude
- Rod McCary as Attorney Mason
- Michael Warren as Desmond

=== Special guest appearances ===
- Vanessa Bell Calloway as Monique
- Nell Carter as Barbara Rogers
- Terry Ellis as Deidre
- Pam Grier as Ms. Grayson
- Billy Preston as Himself
- Anna Maria Horsford as Wilma's Aunt
- Kenya Moore as Ms. Collins
- Ron O'Neal as Arthur Fairchild
- Jason Kidd as Himself

== Episodes ==
=== Series overview ===
Season	Episodes	Originally released	
Season	Episodes	First released	Last released
1	22	August 26, 1996	May 19, 1997
2	18	August 25, 1997	March 2, 1998

=== Season 1 (1996–97) ===
No. overall	No. in season	Title	Directed by	Written by	Original release date	Prod. code	Viewers (millions)
1	1	"Pilot"	Ed. Weinberger	Ed. Weinberger	August 26, 1996	001	5.2
2	2	"Palimony Suit"	Unknown	Unknown	September 2, 1996	002	3.3
3	3	"How Papa Got His Groove Back"	Unknown	Unknown	September 9, 1996	003	3.0
4	4	"A Day in the Life"	Unknown	Unknown	September 16, 1996	005	3.6
5	5	"Sid, Lies and Videotape"	Unknown	Unknown	September 23, 1996	007	3.3
6	6	"Penal Envy"	Unknown	Unknown	September 30, 1996	006	3.2
7	7	"No Sweat"	Unknown	Unknown	October 14, 1996	004	4.3
8	8	"Pillow Talk"	Unknown	Unknown	November 4, 1996	008	4.3
9	9	"One on One"	Unknown	Unknown	November 5, 1996	010	4.3
10	10	"Goode for the Gander"	Unknown	Unknown	November 11, 1996	009	3.1
11	11	"Porky's Revenge"	Bob Moloney	Ed. Weinberger	November 18, 1996	011	3.1
12	12	"Maxey Gets the Bird"	Unknown	Unknown	November 25, 1996	012	2.9
13	13	"It's the Gospel"	Unknown	Unknown	January 13, 1997	013	4.21
14	14	"I, Spy"	Unknown	Unknown	January 20, 1997	015	4.25
15	15	"Won't You Be My Neighbor"	Unknown	Unknown	February 3, 1997	016	3.93
16	16	"Love Conquers All"	Stan Daniels	Ed. Weinberger	February 10, 1997	018	4.45
17	17	"Self Defense"	Unknown	Unknown	February 17, 1997	017	4.39
18	18	"Hoop Schemes"	Unknown	Unknown	February 24, 1997	014	4.63
19	19	"The Great Indoors"	Unknown	Unknown	April 28, 1997	020	4.02
20	20	"Love in a Cup"	Bob Moloney	Mark E. Corry	May 5, 1997	019	3.86
21	21	"Too Hot Not to Cool Down"	Unknown	Unknown	May 12, 1997	021	3.65
22	22	"A Day in the Life II"	Unknown	Unknown	May 19, 1997	022	3.68

=== Season 2 (1997–98) ===
No. overall	No. in season	Title	Directed by	Written by	Original release date	Prod. code	Viewers (millions)
23	1	"To the Maxey"	Unknown	Unknown	August 25, 1997	028	4.27
24	2	"Maxey Loses His Spark"	Unknown	Unknown	September 1, 1997	026	3.63
25	3	"Rehearsal of Fortune"	Unknown	Unknown	September 8, 1997	025	3.78
26	4	"Dog Gone"	Unknown	Unknown	September 15, 1997	024	3.63
27	5	"When a Man is a Woman"	Stan Daniels	Lenny Ripps & Rob Dames	September 22, 1997	030	3.63
28	6	"Defending Claude"	Unknown	Unknown	September 29, 1997	023	4.36
29	7	"Don't Get Hooked on Me"	Kim Freidman	Allison Taylor	October 13, 1997	031	4.67
30	8	"Bad Reception"	Bob Moloney	Allison Taylor	October 27, 1997	033	4.58
31	9	"A Bride for Alonzo"	Unknown	Unknown	November 3, 1997	032	3.91
32	10	"Brotherly Love"	Unknown	Unknown	November 10, 1997	027	4.35
33	11	"Roots III"	Bob Moloney	Ron Nelson & Mark Steen	November 17, 1997	034	4.83
34	12	"It's Good to Be Negative"	Unknown	Unknown	November 24, 1997	035	4.21
35	13	"Silent Night"	Stan Daniels	Lenny Ripps & Rob Dames	December 16, 1997	040	2.64
36	14	"Flirting with Disaster"	Wendy Acey	Ron Nelson & Mark Steen	January 12, 1998	038	3.79
37	15	"She's Having My Baby"	Wendy Acey	Gisele Sanchez Rochet	January 19, 1998	039	3.81
38	16	"Cain and Abel Sparks"	Unknown	Unknown	February 16, 1998	029	3.23
39	17	"Till Your Well Runs Dry"	Unknown	Unknown	February 23, 1998	036	2.73
40	18	"Blind Justice"	Unknown	Unknown	March 2, 1998	037	3.54

== Reception ==
Kevin D. Thompson of The Palm Beach Post gave the show a mostly-negative review, criticizing Avery's performances and the "normal cardboard cutout characters". Frederic M. Biddle of the Boston Globe also criticized the performances of the lead actors and thought that Núñez's and Howard's characters were "silently perpetuating stereotypes equating character with Caucasian features".
