= Miguel A. Núñez Jr. =

American actor (born 1959)

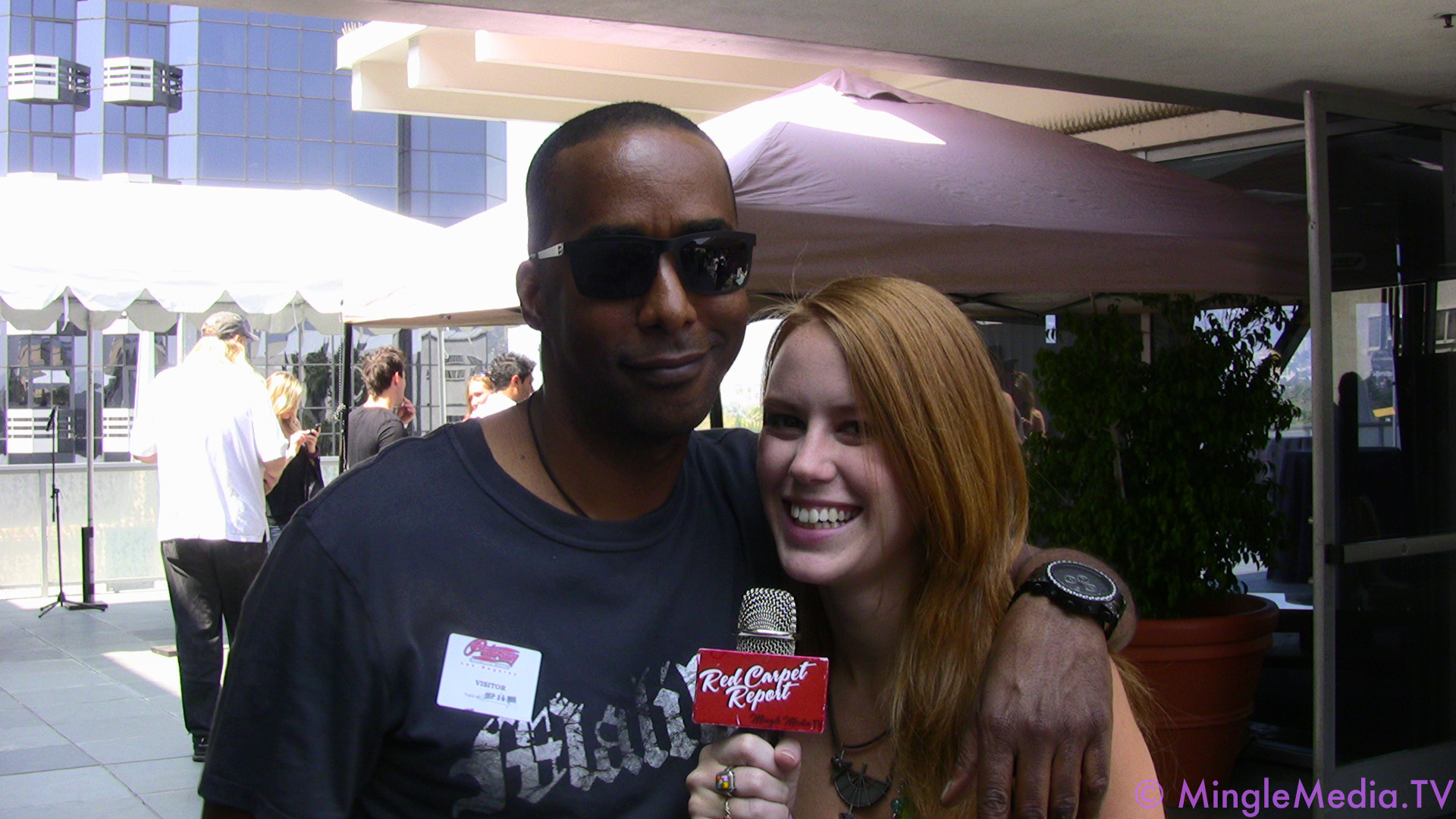
- Núñez (left) in 2011
- Born: August 11, 1964 (age 62); New York City, U.S.
- Occupations: Actor; producer; writer
- Years active: 1983–present

Miguel A. Núñez Jr. (born August 11, 1964) is an American actor. He is best known for his roles in Juwanna Mann, Life, and The Return of the Living Dead. He played a leading role in Tour of Duty and appears on the BET drama The Family Business and the UPN sitcom Sparks.

== Biography ==
Núñez was born in New York City, to an African American mother and a Dominican father, and was raised by his grandparents in Wilson, North Carolina.

His mother, Betty Jean Newsome, was a songwriter who co-wrote "It's a Man's, Man's, Man's World" with James Brown.

== Career ==
One of his major screen roles was the supporting role of Spider in The Return of the Living Dead, and his first major starring role was that of Marcus Taylor on the series Tour of Duty, where he was a main cast member for all three seasons of the show. He later appeared on the short-lived series My Wildest Dreams, the short-lived show Sparks, and movies such as Juwanna Mann. Núñez also held the recurring role of Zach in the second season of the Friends spinoff Joey and portrayed Dee Jay in Street Fighter. Núñez was also an executive producer of the 2014 comedy-drama musical film School Dance.

== Filmography ==
=== Film ===
Year	Title	Role	Notes
1984	Joy of Sex	Jock #2	
1985	Friday the 13th: A New Beginning	"Demon" Winter	
1985	The Return of the Living Dead	Spider	
1985	Gus Brown and Midnight Brewster	-	TV movie
1985	HeartBeat	Sam	TV movie
1986	Dangerously Close	Leon Biggs	
1986	Jumpin' Jack Flash	Street Tough	
1988	Action Jackson	Poolroom Thug #1	
1989	Harlem Nights	Man With Broken Nose	
1990	Shadowzone	Wiley	
1992	Secrets	Wickford	TV movie
1992	Lethal Weapon 3	Squad Member #4	
1992	Round Trip to Heaven	Leon	
1994	Hard Vice	Bugs	
1994	There Goes My Baby	Rodney	
1994	Street Fighter	Dee Jay	
1995	Carnosaur 2	Ed Moses	
1995	Slam Dunk Ernest	T.J.	Video
1995	W.E.I.R.D. World	Bob Provost	TV movie
1996	A Thin Line Between Love and Hate	Reggie	
1996	Leprechaun 4: In Space	Private Sticks	Video
1997	For Richer or Poorer	IRS Insp. Frank Hall	
1998	Why Do Fools Fall in Love	Young Little Richard	
1999	Life	"Biscuit"	
1999	If You Only Knew	Troy	
2000	Nutty Professor II: The Klumps	Scientist	
2001	MacArthur Park	"Blackie"	
2001	Flossin	Principal Jones	
2001	Tara	J.D. Mogo	Video
2002	ZigZag	Bentley	
2002	Scooby-Doo	Voodoo Maestro	
2002	Juwanna Mann	Jamal "Juwanna Mann" Jefferies	
2002	The Adventures of Pluto Nash	Miguel	
2005	Friends and Lovers	Leonard	Video
2005	Flip the Script	Preston Scott	
2005	Bathsheba	Joab	Short
2005	Clean Up Men	Lionel	
2006	National Lampoon's TV: The Movie	Various Roles	
2007	All Lies on Me	Chico	Video
2007	Kickin' It Old Skool	Darnell Jackson	
2008	Meet Dave	Burley Crew Member	
2009	Black Dynamite	Mo "Bitches"	
2009	Steppin: The Movie	James	
2009	Diamond Dawgs	"South Central"	
2010	Trapped: Haitian Nights	Gary	
2010	Double Crossed	Nate	Video
2010	Back Nine	Tiger	TV movie
2011	Nora's Hair Salon 3: Shear Disaster	Charles	Video
2011	Hollywood & Wine	"Hawk" Miller	Video
2011	Should've Put a Ring on It	Pastor Fields	
2011	Breathe	"C"	
2012	Who Killed Soul Glow?	Himself	
2012	Christmas in Compton	Delicious	
2012	Nice Guy	Dr. Brown	Short
2013	Haitian Nights	Gary	
2013	A Christmas Wedding	Deistl Douglas	
2014	Men, Money & Gold Diggers	Lionel	
2014	Basketball Girlfriend	Mr. Murray	
2015	Why She Cries	Uncle Nate	
2016	Hunting Season	Agent Collins	
2016	Love Had Everything to Do with It	-	
2016	King of Newark	Federal Agent	
2017	Secrets of Deception	Tim	
2017	2016	Viper	
2017	10 Days in Sun City	Ongime	
2017	Conflict of Interest	Daryl	
2017	Vikes	Manifestus	
2017	The Accidental Spy	The Viper	
2018	No More Mr Nice Guy	Willie Monroe	
2018	Worth	Dr. Harris	
2018	The Other Side	Tobias	
2018	1 Angry Black Man	Detective	
2018	Bella's Story	Joking Barber	
2018	The Griddle House	Peterson	
2019	Fanatic	Sylvester	TV movie
2019	The Pining	Father Mackinroe	
2019	A Holiday Change	Donell Brooks	
2020	The Sin Choice	-	
2020	Ride Scare	Detective	
2020	The American King	Peewee	
2020	The App That Stole Christmas	Gramps	
2022	The American King-As told by an African Priestess	Pewee	
2022	John Wynn's One Hour	Attorney Lane	
2022	17 Days	Joe Murphy	
2022	The Elite Society: The Tokens	Edwin	
2022	Clew	Nick	
2023	Survival	Sgt. Whittle	
2023	The Fearless Three	Male Commentator	
2023	Mother-In-Law	Mr. Samuels	
2023	The Microchip that Ruined Halloween	Dean Ono Pointdexter	
2023	The Drone that Saved Christmas	Elijah Bryant	
2023	#BlackSkin	Johnthan	
2023	Born 2 Hustle	Morgan aka Daddy	

=== Television ===
Year	Title	Role	Notes
1984	Automan	Valet Parking Attendant	Episode: "Murder MTV"
1984	Trapper John, M.D.	Thalmus	Episode: "It's About Time"
1985	The Twilight Zone	Trojan	Episode: "Teacher's Aide"
1985	What's Happening Now!!	-	Episode: "Married or Not"
1986–1987	Amen	Jerome	Recurring Cast: Season 1
1987	Isabel's Honeymoon Hotel	-	Episode: "Episode #1.1"
1987	The New Gidget	Alphonse	Episode: "Oddballs"
1987	Stingray	Curtis Roberts	Episode: "Blood Money"
1987–1990	Tour of Duty	Sgt. Marcus Taylor	Main Cast
1990	Dear John	Henry	Episode: "Homeward Bound"
1991	The Fresh Prince of Bel-Air	Slick	Episode: "72 Hours"
1992–1993	Rhythm & Blues	Jammin	Main Cast
1993	Hangin' with Mr. Cooper	Jason	Recurring Cast: Season 1
1993	Martin	Ricky aka “Pretty Ricky”	Episode: "Really, Gina's Not My Lover"
1993	Lois & Clark: The New Adventures of Superman	Jules	Episode: "Neverending Battle"
1993	Thea	Rickey	Recurring Cast
1993–1994	Living Single	Goldie	Recurring Cast: Season 1
1994	Babylon 5	Orwell	Episode: "A Distant Star"
1995	The Watcher	-	Episode: "No Hope for the Dead"
1995	My Wildest Dreams	Chandler Trapp	Main Cast
1996	The Faculty	Luis Jackson	Main Cast
1996–1998	Sparks	Maxey Sparks	Main Cast
1999	The Hughleys	Jojo	Recurring Cast: Season 2
2000	Intimate Portrait	Himself	Episode: "Robin Givens"
2000	The Parkers	Royal Jackson	Episode: "Love Is a Royal Pain"
2002	The Bernie Mac Show	Clyde	Episode: "Handle Your Business"
2002	Boomtown	Freaktown	Episode: "The Freak"
2002	Andy Richter Controls the Universe	Ted Swathmore	Episode: "We're All the Same, Only Different"
2003	My Wife and Kids	Max	Episode: "Man of the Year" & "Tee for Too Many"
2003	Tarzan	Detective Sam Sullivan	Main Cast
2004	The Tracy Morgan Show	Billy Anderson	Episode: "Career Day"
2005–2006	Joey	Zach Miller	Main Cast: Season 2
2008	Black Poker Stars Invitational	Himself	Main Guest
2010	Blue Mountain State	Transvestite Prostitute	Episode: "Rivalry Weekend"
2011	Mad Love	Carter	Episode: "Fireworks"
2012	Behind the Talent	Himself	Episode: "Aspen Mansion"
2012	Are We There Yet?	Orlando	Episode: "The Family Portrait Episode"
2013	Belle's	Cousin Maurice	Main Cast
2014	Celebrity Paranormal Lockdown	Himself	Episode: "Broughton School"
2014	Family Time	-	Episode: "No New Friends"
2015	Unsung Hollywood	Himself	Episode: "Vivica A. Fox"
2015	In the Cut	Gerald 'Pork Chop' Washington	Episode: "Gold Diggers for Dummies"
2015–2016	Mann & Wife	Perp/Ugly Gary	Guest Cast: Season 1-2
2016	Unsung Hollywood	Himself	Episode: "Guy and Joe Torry"
2016	Apollo Night LA	Himself/Celebrity Host	Episode: "ANLA 150"
2018	Nashville	Tommy Reddick	Recurring Cast: Season 6
2018	Bronx SIU	The Chief	Main Cast: Season 1
2018–2025	The Family Business	Harris Grant	Main Cast: Season 1-4, Recurring Cast: Season 6
2019	Trayizon	Rich	Episode: "Trailer"
2020	Two Degrees	Miguel	Episode: "Bonus Adults"
2021	Coroner's Report	Demon Winter	Episode: "Demon Winter"
2022	Raven's Home	Stone	Episode: "21 Lunch Street"
2023	Cocaine Sisters	Kelvin Turner	Recurring Cast
