= Toni Tones =

Nigerian media personality

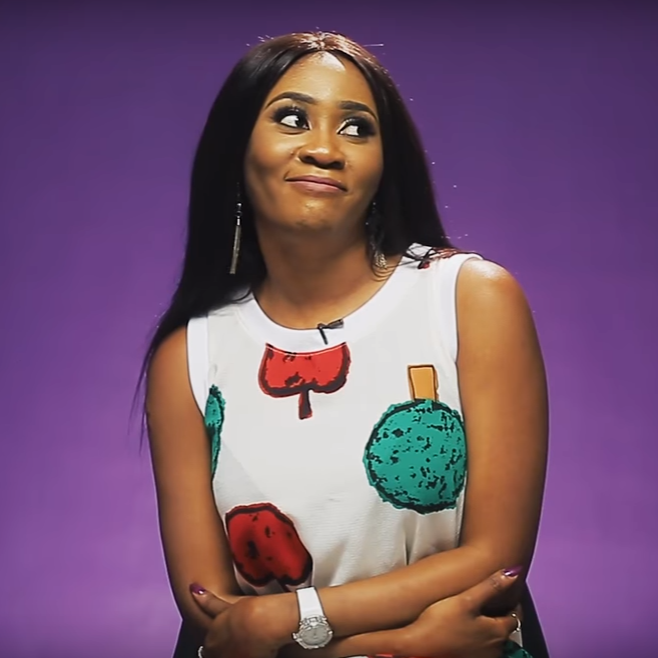
- on Ndani TV
- Born: Gbemisola Anthonia Adefuye
- Education: Queen's College, Lagos; University of Lancaster
- Occupations: Media personality; actress; photographer; singer
- Website: www.tonitones.com

Gbemisola Anthonia Adefuye, known professionally as Toni Tones, is a Nigerian media personality, actress, and photographer. In 2020, she was nominated for the Best Supporting Actress at the Africa Magic Viewers' Choice Awards.

== Early Life & Education ==
Adefuye is the youngest of a family of five. Her early education was in Lagos where she completed her studies at Queen's College. At the age of 14, she modelled for Dakova, a family friend.

Adefuye attended the University of Lancaster where she studied marketing and economics. After completing her course, she returned to Nigeria in 2009 to pursue a career in show business. Her brother had been a musician with the band Oxygen.

== Career ==
Adefuye initially worked as a show business photographer. Her portfolio attracted the attention of D'banj's reality show, Koko Mansion.

In 2017, Adefuye continued photography while also taking roles behind and in front of the camera. She has appeared as an actor in the web TV series Gidi-culture and in several films, including It's Her Day (2016). She also starred in the film King of Boys. as the younger Eniola Salami. The film premiered on October 21, 2020. At the 2020 AMVCA, she was nominated or Best Supporting Actress in a Movie or TV Series for King of Boys.

In 2020, she appeared in Quam's Money, a sequel to the 2018 film New Money. The story follows a security guard, Quam, who suddenly becomes a multi-millionaire. The cast included Falz, Jemima Osunde, Blossom Chukwujekwu, and Nse Ikpe-Etim.

== Filmography ==
=== Television ===
Year	Title	Role	Notes	Ref
2014	Deadline	Beverly		
2014	Married to the Game	Ms. Fatai		
2016	Rumour Has It		An NdaniTV web series	
2018	Forbidden	Becky	260 episodes	
2018	Room 420	Funmi Diya		
2020	Assistant Madams	Self		
2020	The Smart Money Woman	Lara	9 episodes	
2021	Mascara	Claire		
2021	King of Boys: The Return of the King	Young Eniola	Netflix original series	

=== Films ===
Year	Title	Role	Notes	Ref
2015	What Lies Untold			
2016	It's Her Day	Stacy	Comedy	
2017	The Royal Hibiscus Hotel	Esther	Comedy / Romance	
2017	5th Floor	Ruby	Drama	
2017	Head over Heels			
2018	The Eve	Ngozi	Romance	
2018	Lara and the Beat	Trish	Drama / Music / Romance	
2018	King of Boys	Young Eniola	Crime / Drama	
2019	Your Excellency	Stephanie		
2019	Foreigner's God	Ginika	Drama/Fantasy/Mystery	
2020	Quam's Money	Eme	Comedy / Crime	
2022	Brotherhood	Goldie	Action / Crime	
2024	KM17	Cheeka	Drama / Thriller	
2024	Aburo	Dr. Edak	Directed by Yemi Morafa	
2024	Angie's Love	Angela	Short	

== Awards and nominations ==
Year	Award	Category	Work	Result	Ref
2020	Africa Movie Academy Awards	Best Supporting Actress in a Movie or TV Series	King of Boys	Nominated	
2020	2020 Best of Nollywood Awards	Best Actress in a Lead Role –English	Killing Jade	Nominated	
2023	Africa Magic Viewers' Choice Awards	Best Supporting Actress	Brotherhood	Nominated	
