= The Ghost and the Tout =

2018 Nigerian film

- Directed by: Charles Uwagbai
- Screenplay by: Toyin Abraham; Charles Uwagbai; Titi Jeje; Biodun Stephen; Damilare Awe
- Story by: Charles Uwagbai
- Produced by: Toyin Abraham; Samuel Olatunji
- Starring: Sambasa Nzeribe; Toyin Abraham; Rachael Okonkwo; Omowumi Dada; Lasisi Elenu
- Production company: Toyin Abraham Productions
- Release date: 11 May 2018
- Running time: 103 minutes
- Country: Nigeria
- Language: English
- Box office: ₦77,233,105

The Ghost and the Tout also known as Ghost and the Tout, is a 2018 Nigerian supernatural comedy film, written and directed by Charles Uwagbai. It stars Sambasa Nzeribe, Toyin Abraham, Rachael Okonkwo and Omowumi Dada in the lead roles. The film had its theatrical release in Nigeria on 11 May 2018 and received positive reviews from critics.

The film was a box office success, grossing ₦30 million within one week, and ranking as the fifth highest grossing Nigerian film in 2018. It ranks 25th on the overall list of highest-grossing films in Nigeria. The film is available for streaming on Netflix.

== Plot ==
A young woman from the ghetto named Isila encounters a ghost named Mike, who is in need of her assistance to communicate with the people he left behind and to find out who was behind his death. At the ghost's request, she becomes tangled and puzzled in solving a murder mystery, and her life takes an interesting turn. Only she knows and understands what would happen in the future.

== Cast ==
- Sambasa Nzeribe as Ghost (Mike)
- Toyin Abraham as Isila
- Rachael Okonkwo as Ramota
- Ronke Ojo as Kafila
- Chioma Chukwuka as Ejika
- Lasisi Elenu as Hoodlum
- Chioma Omeruah as Chigirl
- Dele Odule as Chief Obanikoro
- Chiwetalu Agu as Chief Ajanaku
- Femi Adebayo as Dayo
- Omowumi Dada as Janet
- Biodun Stephen as Mrs. Ajanaku
- Princess Oyebo as Obanikoro's secretary
- Bayray McNwizu as Adunni
- Jumoke George
- Nkechi Blessing Sunday as Dora

== Box office ==
The Ghost And The Tout grossed ₦30 million after one week in cinemas and ₦77 million overall.

== Sequel ==
The sequel, The Ghost And The Tout Too, was released on 5 September 2021 and premiered on Netflix on 15 July 2022.
