= 10 Days in Sun City =

2017 film directed by Adze Ugah

10 days in Sun City
- Theatrical release poster
- Directed by: Adze Ugah
- Produced by: Darlington Abuda
- Starring: Adesua Etomi; AY Makun; Richard Mofe-Damijo; Mercy Johnson; Folarin Falana; Gbenro Ajibade
- Production company: Corporate World Entertainment
- Distributed by: Silverbird Distributions
- Release date: 17 June 2017 (Nigeria)
- Country: Nigeria
- Language: English
- Box office: ₦176.7 million

10 days in Sun City is a 2017 Nigerian romantic action comedy film that premiered on 17 June 2017. It is executive produced by AY Makun, who also plays a lead role in the film. It is directed by Adze Ugah, written by Kehinde Ogunlola, and produced by Darlington Abuda. The film is the third installment in the Akpos Adventure Franchise and was shot at locations in Lagos and Johannesburg, South Africa.

== Synopsis ==
The film tells the story of an aspiring beauty queen who rises to stardom but pays the price of losing her peace and joy by denouncing her fiancé, who is her manager. She was on the verge of being enslaved by her Godfather when he was confronted by some of the people he had deprived of benefits in the past. The film illustrates that true love conquers all, regardless of barriers or challenges encountered.

== Cast ==
- Richard Mofe-Damijo as Otunba Williams
- Adesua Etomi as Bianca
- AY Makun as Akpos
- Mercy Johnson as Monica
- Folarin "Falz" Falana as Seyi
- Gbenro Ajibade as Otunba Bodyguard
- Uti Nwachukwu as Pageant host
- Yvonne Jegede
- Miguel A. Núñez Jr. as Ongime
- Amanda Du-Pont as Kimberley (Kim K.)
- Thenjiwe Moseley
- Celeste Ntuli as Bar owner
- 2face Idibia as himself (cameo)
- Alibaba Akpobome as Chief (cameo)
- Clinton miles as AY Makun fan

== Awards ==
Year	Award	Category	Result	Ref
2018	Best of Nollywood Awards	Best Comedy of the Year	Nominated	
2018	Best of Nollywood Awards	Movie with the Best Cinematography	Won	

== Future ==
30 Days in China is a planned followup to 10 Days in Sun City as the next installment in the Akpos franchise. It is to be produced by the Nigerian firm FilmOne Distributions and the Chinese company Huahua Media. When it was announced in 2019, the film was marketed as an inaugural significant cinematic partnership between Chinese and Nigerian filmmakers. A book published in 2022 said the film was still under production.

== See also ==
- List of Nigerian films of 2017
