= 30 Days in Atlanta =

2014 film by Robert Peters

- Film poster
- Directed by: Robert Peters
- Produced by: Ayo Makun
- Starring: Ayo Makun; Ramsey Nouah; Richard Mofe Damijo; Desmond Elliot; Vivica A. Fox; Lynn Whitfield; Karlie Redd; Majid Michel; Omoni Oboli; Racheal Oniga; Yemi Blaq; Juliet Ibrahim
- Cinematography: James M. Costello
- Release date: 31 October 2014
- Country: Nigeria
- Language: English
- Box office: ₦163 million

30 Days in Atlanta is a 2014 Nigerian romantic comedy film written by Patrick "Koinage" Nnamani, produced by Ayo Makun and directed by Robert Peters. The movie was shot in two locations in Lagos and Atlanta, United States of America. It premiered on October 31, 2014. It was recognized as the highest-grossing film of all time in Nigerian cinemas in 2015, although the film received mixed critical reviews.

== Plot ==
Akpos wins a month-long trip to Atlanta, Georgia and invites his cousin Richard to come along. Upon arrival, they run into their old friend Okiemute, who takes them out to dinner. Akpos meets the beautiful Kimberly and wishes to ask her out, but Okiemute warns him that Kimberly's father is very controlling. Kimberly, Akpos, and Richard run into each other again at an environmental conference, where Akpos makes a few awkwardly funny remarks. Kimberly, however, is more interested in Richard. She gives Richard her phone number, and they leave just in time for her father, the restaurateur Odiye, to show up.

Richard returns to the restaurant to wait for Kimberly's visit, but Akpos shows up unannounced. Kimberly tells Akpos her father enjoyed his comments at the conference and wants to offer him a stand-up comedy contract. On the way home by taxi, Richard realizes he left his wallet behind. When the driver finds out they cannot pay the fare, he kicks them out of the cab. Kimberly and Odiye give them a ride back to Odiye's home, where they meet the family, as well as Odiye's immigration lawyer, Clara. Akpos and Clara begin a romantic relationship.

On a Skype call with his parents, Richard learns that his former girlfriend Ese is making wedding arrangements. He tries to convince his mother that they have ended their relationship and mentions Kimberly. Richard introduces Kimberly to his parents, but his mother insists he should marry Ese. Ese tries to convince Kimberly that Richard will only disappoint her. Ese shows Kimberly intimate pictures of her with Richard. Kimberly becomes heartbroken and drives away from the house in tears.

Akpos becomes involved with illegal street gambling and is arrested. Clara visits him in jail and agrees to represent him. It is discovered that Akpos has violated his visa, making his case more severe and punishable by law. In court, the judge agrees that the total income Akpos has earned will be sufficient as compensation for his legal and visa violation if the money is donated to charity under supervision. In order to avert further violations, Clara takes him to her house, where the two have dinner, followed by sex. Later, Clara overhears Akpos on the phone, implying that his relationship with her will facilitate his green card and American citizenship. Clara becomes furious that Akpos might have taken advantage of her influential position and ejects Akpos from her house.

Richard attempts to mend his relationship with Kimberly, but Odiye orders him to leave his daughter alone, reiterating the bad image many young Nigerian men portray to the Western world. Richard argues with Ese about her interference in his relationship with Kimberly.

Akpos reluctantly donates his earnings to charity. At the airport, as the men prepare to board their flight back to Nigeria, they are surprised to see Kimberly and Clara, who have both decided to follow them back to Nigeria and meet their relatives.

== Cast ==
- Ayo Makun as Akpors
- Ramsey Nouah as Richard
- Richard Mofe Damijo as Odiye
- Desmond Elliot as Okiemute
- Kesse Jabari as Wilson
- Vivica A. Fox as Wilson's wife
- Lynn Whitfield as Odiye's immigration lawyer, Clara
- Karlie Redd as Kimberly
- Majid Michel as Adetola Briggs
- Omoni Oboli
- Racheal Oniga as Richard's mum
- Mercy Johnson as Esse
- Ada Ameh as Akpors Mum
- Yemi Blaq
- Juliet Ibrahim as Adetola's wife
- Ifedayo Olarinde as Freeze

== Reception ==
=== Critical reception ===
The film was well received by the general audience, but was met with mixed to negative critical reviews. Most critics note that the film's comedy was filled with clichés and stereotype, and that the film seemed like a remake of Osuofia in London (2003), the Jenifa franchise, or a hybrid of both.

Nollywood Reinvented gave a 24% rating, commenting: "For the length of the approximately 2hr long movie, there was a competent joke in every part for at least the first hour and a half. But that's about where the greatness of the movie begins and ends. There is hardly any originality or attempt to make it less predictable". The Daily Independent commented that the comedy in the film is filled with clichés and stereotypes, but a proper story eventually emerged. It concluded that "he [Ayo Makun] has sent a strong message with this effort that a good quality comedy film can be made". Wilfred Okiche of YNaija cited that the film has "filmmaking errors and production glitches", bt admits to the film being funny. He says Ayo Makun isn't "a rounded actor", calls the film a hybrid of Osuofia in London (2003) and The Return of Jenifa (2011), and concludes: "...there is no single, continuous plot but a series of sketches and happenstances cobbled together to make up a movie. The pacing moves breezingly [sic] enough to obscure the lack of a substantial story but, it does little to hide the deficiency with continuity as the scenes just clash noisily into theeachher. The jokes are gold—though failing unsurprisingly only when AY attempts stand up- 30 Days in Atlanta is funny, bt poorly made".

Today's Woman magazine gave the film 3 out of 5 stars, commenting: "The beginning scenes were cliche, predictable and reminded me a little too much of Osuofia in London. However, once we passed this phase, the movie was in, actual fact, hilarious. Babatunde Lasaki on 360Nobs gave 6 out of 10 stars and comments: "A usual story retold in an unusually funny manner. Definitely not a contender for innovation or ingenuity, but I will say a comic relief from the many bland productions of 2014. 30 Days in Atlanta is a fine movie, not a MUST see, but definitely worth two hours of comedic fun. Obehi Bassey of True Nollywood Stories states that Ayo Makun's acting skills is non-existent, says the film is needlessly dragged, but concludes: "30 days in Atlanta remains a movie worth seeing. Entertaining from the get go, it doesn't let go. It's a comedy that is funny without being annoying and melodramatic. Plus it has some really memorable scenes. Kemi Filani comments: "if you are having a bad day and you need something to get you up and alive, 30 Days in Atlanta is the movie for ya.... [sic]kudos to comedian AY".

=== Box office ===
30 Days in Atlanta went on to break all box-office records for 2014.

== Awards ==
The film received 10 nominations at the 2014 Golden Icons Academy Movie Awards.

== See also ==
- List of Nigerian films of 2014
- 30 Days in China
