= A Trip to Jamaica =

2016 Nigerian comedy drama film

- Theatrical release poster
- Directed by: Robert Peters
- Produced by: Ayo Makun
- Starring: Ayo Makun; Funke Akindele; Nse Ikpe Etim; Dan Davies; Eric Roberts; Alphonso A'Qen-Aten Jackson
- Production company: Corporate World Pictures
- Distributed by: FilmOne
- Release date: 25 September 2016
- Running time: 100 minutes
- Country: Nigeria

A Trip to Jamaica is a 2016 Nigerian comedy drama film directed by Robert Peters starring Ayo Makun, Funke Akindele, Nse Ikpe Etim and Dan Davies (actor). The film tells a story about the adventures of a newly engaged couple in their Relatives' residence outside Nigeria, and how the secrets of their host led to the eventual breakup of their union amidst the culture shock of the new country and living with upper-class citizens. Though a huge box office success, breaking the record set by 30 Days in Atlanta for the highest-grossing Nigerian film, it received mainly mixed to negative reviews from critics.

The movie had its worldwide premiere on 25 September 2016 in Lagos State. The event featured a celebrity football game involving ex-internationals, like Kanu Nwankwo, Jay Jay Okocha, Peter Rufai, Joseph Yobo and Stephen Appiah.

== Plot ==
Akpos proposed to Bola on the phone through a live telecast during the annual One Lagos Fiesta. Bola accepts the marriage proposal, and the newly engaged couple decides to travel overseas for a pre-wedding Honeymoon. On getting to the United States, they are received by Bola's sister, Abigail, and her husband, Michael Rice. On arriving at Michael's home, they are in awe of the magnificent mansion they are to start living in. Bola observes that Abigael doesn't seem too happy living with her husband. Meanwhile, Michael and Akpos go to play golf. Instead of sweeping the ball, he sweeps grass and later falls. Bola inquires about Abigail's mood, but Abigail hesitates and doesn't give any reason for her mood. After Akpos and Michael come back, Bola and Akpoa get into a fight. Later, they hear they are going to Jamaica using Michael's private jet. Akpos and Bola associate with the natives of Jamaica, expressing culture shock on the way. Akpos goes with some Jamaican natives to play soccer, claiming that he taught Jay Jay Okocha how to play soccer. After, he claims that Patoranking and Cynthia Morgan can speak better Jamaican Patois than them. The man is speaking Jamaican patois but cannot be understood by his friends, who hang up after a short while. Akpos goes with the same men and is smoking Jamaican skunk, which makes him go crazy. He also asks for a drink called "Sex on The Beach", which he thought was actual sex on a beach. Akpos and the bar attendant later make out while Bola is "taking swimming lessons from a man called Marlon. Later in the movie, Akpos, Abigail, and Michael are kidnapped by Casper's (Paul Campbell) men, then Bola and the rest call the police, and Casper gets arrested with his men. It is later revealed that Michael is a drug baron who is on the run from a mafia group in a cartel. On discovering that his location has been compromised, Michael relocates his family to Jamaica.

== Cast ==
- Ayo Makun as Akpos
- Funke Akindele as Bola
- Nse Ikpe Etim as Abigail Rice
- Dan Davies as Michael Rice
- Eric Roberts as Sonnie
- Chris Attoh as Tayo Adenuga
- Cynthia Morgan as herself
- Patoranking as himself
- Olamide as himself
- Paul Campbell as Casper
- Rebecca Silvera as Jodi
- Alex Moore as Marlon
- Brian Ray Moore as Ricky
- Gbenga Adeyinka as presenter
- Nancy Isime as One Lagos Fiesta presenter
- Alphonso A'Qen-Aten Jackson as Sonnie's bodyguard
- Barry Piacente as Andrew, the butler

== Reception ==
Nollywood reinvented rated the movie at 31% and states that the only thing the movie has going for it is the laughs, but that too is sparse in quantity.

Okon Ekpo of YNaija panned the film from the acting to the story and the directing. He opined that the director [Peters] had not improved from his lapses in 30 Days in Atlanta. He went further to fault the storyline explaining that the screenplay was "shoddy" and "unsure of itself". He described Funke Akindele, as a genuinely funny actress, who was finding it difficult to be humorous because of the poor script. He also noted that the acting was a letdown from what was seen in 30 Days in Atlanta but praised the continuity and picture quality as an improvement from the previous film.

Isedehi Aigbogun of Film Scriptic gave it a mixed to positive review, saying: "A Trip to Jamaica is a thoroughly enjoyable and humorous movie....it's quite interesting seeing Dan Davies (Michael) as an evil person who surprisingly knows how to keep his calm. The audience feels a lot of tension when the comical couple go over the top with him...this is a strong theme. Nse Ikpe-Etim (Abigal) was exquisite in her act....although some of the other performances fell short of what was expected. Overall I genuinely enjoyed the movie".

Chidumga Izuzu of Pulse Nigeria was also critical of the film's comedic themes, describing it as a "mediocre comedy film" with limited laughing points and many unconnected jokes. She explained that Etim's interpretation of her role was flat and was lacking life. Makun was noted to have exaggerated his role as Apors. Izuzu also opined that the inclusion of Patoranking and Cynthia Morgan added no value to the film. On the plot, he described the film as proving that "a funny idea does not always make a funny movie". In comparison to 30 Days in Atlanta, Izuzu described the film as "a lesser intelligent story".

Prior to the release of the film to Nigerian cinemas, Ayo Makun reiterated that he was optimistic that the economic recession in Nigeria wouldn't affect the box office success of the film. After its release, the film was reported to have grossed higher than top Hollywood films in 2016 including Batman v Superman: Dawn of Justice, Captain America: Civil War, Suicide Squad, London Has Fallen, Gods of Egypt and Doctor Strange.

In November 2016, the film was reported to have grossed 168 million naira, breaking the previous record set by 30 Days in Atlanta. It also broke records for the first film to hit 35 million in first weekend, the first film to hit 62 million in its first week, the fastest film to gross 100 million (17 days) and the fastest film to gross 150 million (six weeks).

It opened at the Odeon Cinemas in London in December 2016 and became the highest-grossing film that weekend in London while also becoming the highest per screen average film in the UK during its limited run.

It won the Africa Entertainment Legends Award (AELA) for Best Cinema Film of 2016 and received four nominations at the 2017 Africa Magic Viewers Choice Awards, including categories for best actress in a comedy, best writer, best movie (West Africa) and best actor in a comedy. The award show was held in March 2017 in Lagos State.

Complete list of awards
| Year | Award | Category | Recipient(s) | Result | Ref. |
|---|---|---|---|---|---|
| 2017 | Best of Nollywood Awards | Movie with the Best Cinematography | A Trip to Jamaica | Won | |
| 2017 | Best of Nollywood Awards | Best Comedy of the Year | A Trip to Jamaica | Won | |
