= American Driver =

- American Driver Poster
- Directed by: Moses Inwang
- Screenplay by: Patrick Nnamani
- Story by: Moses Inwang; Bode Ojo
- Produced by: Bode Ojo
- Starring: Evan King; Jim Iyke; Nse Ikpe Etim; Ayo Makun; Emma Nyra; Nadia Buari; Anita Chris; MCPC the Comedian; Michael Tula; Laura Heuston; Johnny Dewan; Melvin Oduah; Andie Raven
- Cinematography: Okechukwu Oku; Tila Ben
- Edited by: Tunde Bakare; Obiajulu Coby Ejiagwa
- Production companies: Sneeze Films; Golden Icons Media; Get Known Productions
- Distributed by: Sneeze Films
- Release date: February 24, 2017
- Running time: 87 minutes
- Country: Nigeria
- Language: English
- Box office: ₦41,000,000 Naira ($113,103.82)

American Driver is a 2017 Nigerian comedy film written by Bode Ojo, Moses Inwang, and Patrick Nnamani and directed by Moses Inwang and starring Evan King, Jim Iyke, Anita Chris, Nse Ikpe Etim, McPc the Comedian, Emma Nyra, Laura Heuston, and Ayo Makun.

The film premiered in Nigeria on February 24, 2017. It grossed over ₦41 million and ranked eighth at the Nigerian Box Office in 2017 and 44th of all time. The film won Best Comedy at The People's Film Festival in June 2017. American Driver was officially released in the United States on September 15, 2020 on Amazon Prime Video.

== Plot ==
Jack Curry is an American man child who takes a job driving Nigerian celebrities to the G.I.A.M.A Awards to impress his boss, Kate. Along his journey he tries to become friends with actor Jim Iyke, who wants to be left alone.

== Cast ==
- Evan King as Jack Curry
- Jim Iyke as himself
- Anita Chris as Kate
- Nse Ikpe Etim as herself
- Ayo Makun as himself
- Emma Nyra as herself
- McPc the Comedian as Sunny
- Nadia Buari as herself
- Laura Heuston as Mrs. Curry
- Michael Tula as Philip
- Melvin Oduah as himself
- Johnny Dewan as Indian restaurant manager
- Andie Raven as Dr. Raven
- Vickey Dempsy Burns as nurse
- Mrs. Curr as Melvin Oduah
- Tila Ben as rapping neighbor
- Amarachi Odinma as female job interviewer
- Dami Oyesanya as GIAMA executive 1
- Alex Mouth as jail cell member
- Murphy Serge as Boko Man
- Curtis John Miller as security officer 2
- Johnathan Michael Gustov Lemon as security officer 1

== Release ==
=== Nigerian Theatrical Release ===
American Driver premiered in Nigeria on February 24, 2017 and was released in theaters nationwide.

=== U.S. Release ===
In 2017, American Driver screened in New York City from June 2 to June 4 at The People's Film Festival and won Best Comedy Feature. American Driver was released in the United States on September 15, 2020 on Amazon Prime Video.

== Reception ==
Cinema Pointer called the film "Fresh. Fun. Entertaining."

=== Box office ===
Nigerian audiences embraced the film. American Driver opened as the number-one comedy, ran for more than six months in Nigerian cinemas and grossed over ₦41 million at the box office.

=== Accolades ===
American Driver won Best Comedy at The People's Film Festival 2017. The film was also nominated for "Comedy of the Year" at the 2017 Best of Nollywood Awards.

Actor Evan King won best comedic actor for his work in American Driver at the 2019 U.S. China International Cultural Arts Film & TV Festival.

== See also ==
- List of Nigerian films of 2017

== Sequel ==
Director Moses Inwang and actor Evan King have shown interest in returning to make American Driver 2. Evan King stated in a 2021 podcast that the film was successful enough that "They want to make a sequel. So you'll get to see what happens to "Jack" next."
