= Gbenga Adeyinka =

Nigerian actor, comedian, radio and TV presenter, writer, and MC

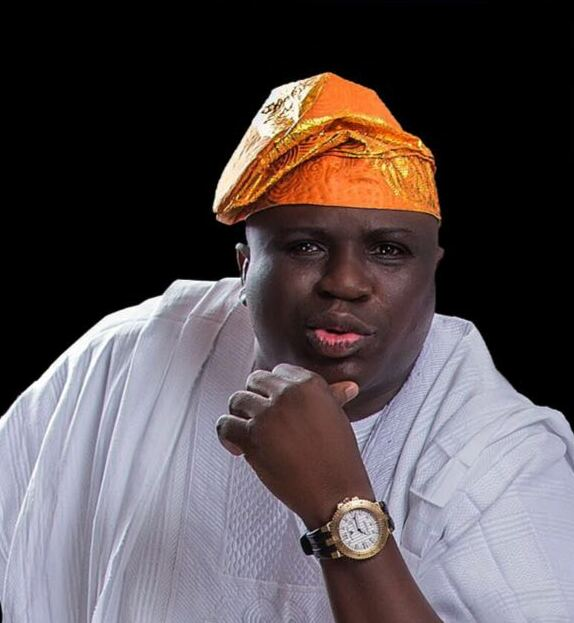
- Born: 7 May 1968 (age 58); Abeokuta, Ogun State, Nigeria
- Other names: CFR (Comedian of the Federal Republic) and now GCON (Grand Comedian of Nigeria)
- Education: University of Lagos
- Occupations: Actor; Comedian; Radio & TV presenter; Writer; Producer
- Spouse: Abiola Adewunmi Adeyinka (m. 1996)
- Children: 3

Gbenga Adeyinka (born 7 May 1968) is a Nigerian actor, comedian, radio and TV presenter, writer, and MC. He hails from Abeokuta in Ogun State and he usually refers to himself as CFR (Comedian of the Federal Republic) and now GCON (Grand Comedian of Nigeria).

== Education ==
Adeyinka attended University of Lagos, where he studied English.

== Career ==
Adeyinka worked as a corporate affairs manager in the engineering firm. He became popular with his "shine shine bobo" promo for Star Game Show, he has also anchored television programmes for AIT, Galaxy TV, MBI, and Africa Magic on DStv. He speaks various Nigerian languages.

== Personal life ==
Adeyinka is married to Abiola Adeyinka, and they have three children.

== Professional life ==
Adeyinka has anchored many wedding programmes and events, in and outside Nigeria. He is also the first to publish a comedy magazine in Nigeria known as Laffmattazz. After the show toured around southwest states, it finally returned to Lagos. He decided to go into farming as he started a new food company, Aduni Adeyinka foods, in August 2020 during the COVID-19 pandemic.
