= Richard Mofe-Damijo =

Nigerian politician and actor (born 1961)

Chief Richard Mofe-Damijo
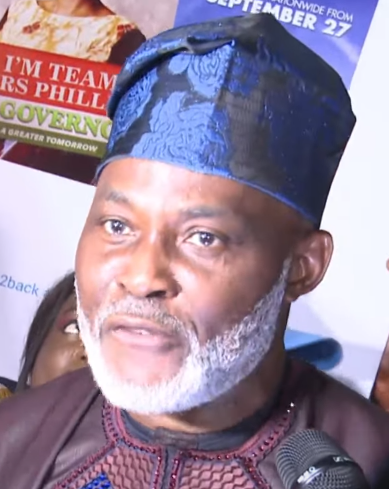
- Mofe-Damijo at the premiere of Love Is War
- Born: Richard Evans Mofe-Damijo; 6 July 1961 (age 65); Aladja, Delta, Nigeria
- Education: University of Benin
- Occupations: Actor, politician
- Years active: 1980s-present
- Spouses: MEE Mofe-Damijo; Jumobi Adegbesan
- Children: 5
- Awards: 2005 Africa Movie Academy Award for Best Actor in a Leading Role

Chief Richard Evans Mofe-Damijo (born 6 July 1961), popularly known as RMD, is a Nigerian actor, writer, producer, lawyer, and former journalist. He served as Commissioner for Culture and Tourism in Delta State from 2009 to 2015. Mofe-Damijo won the Africa Movie Academy Award for Best Actor in a Leading Role in 2005. He received a Lifetime Achievement Award at the 12th Africa Movie Academy Awards in 2016. In 2024, he was honoured with the Industry Merit Awards, alongside Iya Rainbow at the Africa Magic Viewers' Choice Awards.

== Early life ==
Mofe-Damijo was born in Aladja, Udu Kingdom, in present-day Delta State. He attended Midwest College, Warri, and Anglican Grammar School, where he was a member of the drama club. He studied theatre arts at the University of Benin, and later studied law at the University of Lagos, graduating in 2004.

== Career ==
After graduating from university with a theatre arts degree, Mofe-Damijo appeared in the soap opera Ripples as a police inspector but gained more popularity as villain Segun Kadiri in the rival soap Checkmate. Before then, he had a stint as a writer with the daily newspaper The Concord, and magazines Metro and Quality. Out of Bounds was the first film for which he received a writer and producer credit. In 2005, at the maiden edition of the Africa Movie Academy Awards, Mofe-Damijo won the award for Best Actor in a Leading Role. On 5 January 2017, he hosted the 2016 GLO-CAF Awards alongside Nigerian journalist Mimi Fawaz. On 8 December 2021, he received a Black Star Honor at the Rhymes on Da Runway in Accra, Ghana.

== Political career ==
Mofe-Damijo was appointed as Special Adviser of Culture and Tourism to Governor Emmanuel Uduaghan of Delta State in 2008. He later served as Commissioner for Culture and Tourism in Delta State from 2009 to 2015.

== Personal life ==
Mofe-Damijo was married to Mary Ellen 'MEE' Ezekiel, a journalist, publisher, and talk show host. After her death in 1996, Mofe-Damijo married Jumobi Adegbesan, a television personality. She later left broadcasting for the corporate sector. RMD has five children.

== Selected filmography ==
=== Film ===
Year	Film	Role	Notes
1997	Out of Bounds	Pastor Voke	with Bimbo Akintola and Racheal Oniga
1997	Hostages		
1998	Scores to Settle		with Liz Benson and Omotola Jalade-Ekeinde
1998	Suicide Mission		with Regina Askia
1998	Diamond Ring	Chief Dike	with Liz Benson and Gbadewonuola Oyelakin aka Teju Babyface
1999	Freedom		
1999	The Price	Pastor Ken	with Eucharia-Anunobi EKWU
2003	When God Says Yes	Harry	with Pete Edochie and Stella Damasus-Aboderin
2003	The Richest Man		
2003	The Return		with Segun Arinze
2003	The Intruder		with Stella Damasus-Aboderin and Rita Dominic
2003	Soul Provider		with Omotola Jalade-Ekeinde
2003	Romantic Attraction		with Stella Damasus-Aboderin, Chioma Chukwuka and Zack Orji
2003	Private Sin	Pastor Jack	with Genevieve Nnaji, Stephanie Okereke, Olu Jacobs and Patience Ozokwor
2003	Passions		with Genevieve Nnaji and Stella Damasus-Aboderin
2003	Love		with Genevieve Nnaji and Segun Arinze
2003	Keeping Faith: Is That Love?		with Genevieve Nnaji and Joke Silva
2003	I Will Die for You		with Omotola Jalade-Ekeinde and Segun Arinze
2003	Emotional Pain	Greg	with Stella Damasus-Aboderin
2003	Ayomida	Police Officer Idama	
2004	The Mayors		with Sam Dede and Segun Arinze
2004	True Romance	Jim	with Rita Dominic and Desmond Elliot
2004	The Legend		with Kate Henshaw-Nuttal
2004	Standing Alone	Daniel	with Stella Damasus-Aboderin and Tony Umez
2004	Sisters' Enemy		
2004	Queen		with Stella Damasus-Aboderin
2004	Little Angel		
2004	Kings Pride		with Stella Damasus-Aboderin
2004	I Want Your Wife	Eddy	
2004	Indecent Girl	Charles	with Ini Edo
2004	Indecent Act		with Rita Dominic
2004	I Believe in You		with Rita Dominic
2004	Engagement Night		with Stella Damasus-Aboderin
2004	Deadly Desire		
2004	Danger Signal	Dr. C.K. Morgan	with Desmond Elliot
2004	Critical Decision		with Genevieve Nnaji and Stephanie Okereke
2004	Burning Desire		with Stella Damasus-Aboderin and Mike Ezuruonye
2004	Critical Assignment	The President	with Hakeem Kae-Kazim
2005	The Bridesmaid	Steve	with Chioma Chukwuka, Kate Henshaw-Nuttal and Stella Damasus-Aboderin
2005	Darkest Night		with Genevieve Nnaji, Segun Arinze and Uche Jombo
2005	Bridge-Stone	Gabriel	with Liz Benson and Zack Orji
2005	Behind Closed Doors		with Stella Damasus-Aboderin, Desmond Elliot and Patience Ozokwor
2005	Baby Girl		with Pete Edochie
2006	Angels of Destiny		with Emeka Ike, Lilian Bach
2007	Caught in the Middle		with Dakore Akande
2014	30 Days in Atlanta	Kimberley's father	with Ada Ameh, Ramsey Nouah
2016	Dinner	Adetunde George Snr	with Iretiola Doyle
2016	The Wedding Party	Felix Onwuka	with Sola Sobowale, Ireti Doyle and Adesua Etomi
2016	The Grudge	Tayo Kindle	with Doyle and Funmi Holder
2017	10 Days in Sun City	Otunba Ayoola Williams	with Ayo Makun and Adesua Etomi
2017	The Wedding Party 2	Felix Onwuka	with Sola Sobowale, Ireti Doyle and Adesua Etomi
2019	God Calling	Sade's father	with Zainab Balogun, Kabiri Fubara, Adedamol Adedeoyin, Onyeka Onwenu, Seun Ajayi, Eku Eduwor, Seun Faqua
2019	Love Is War	Dimeji Phillips	with Omoni Oboli
2020	The New Normal	Chairman	with Bimbo Akintola, Adunni Ade
2021	Fine Wine	Seye George	with Ego Nwosu, Nse Ikpe-Etim, Keppy Ekpenyong and Zainab Balogun
2021	Christmas in Miami	Dafe	with Ayo Makun
2022	Boycott	Bui	with Yemi Blaq, Kunle Coker, Tolulope Asanu
2022	4:4:44	Hillary	With Chiwetalu Agu, Betsy Akan, Seun Akindele
2022	Palava!	Osa Wonda	With Mercy Aigbe, Bisola Aiyeola, Neo Akpofure
2023	The Black Book	Paul Edima	with Ade Laoye, Sam Dede, Shaffy Bello
2023	Tarella: Princess of the Nile	King Ohen	With Onyinye Ezekwe, Timini Egbuson, Esosa Lawson
2025	Radio Voice	Karo	With Timini Egbuson, Nancy Isime, Damilola Adegbite
2025	Makemation	Chief Abiye Douglas	With Shaffy Bello, Tony Umez, Yvonne Jegede, Chioma Chukwuka Akpotha
2027	Children of Blood and Bone		With Idris Elba, Cynthia Erivo, Damson Idris, Chiwetel Ejiofor, Viola Davis

=== TV shows ===
Year	Show	Role	Notes
2018	Castle & Castle	Tega Castle	with Dakore Akande, Ade Laoye and Deyemi Okanlawon
2021	King of Boys: The Return of the King	Reverend Ifeanyi	with Sola Sobowale, Toni Tones, Reminisce and Illbliss
2022	Far From Home	Feyi Wilmer Willoughby	With Funke Akindele, Adesuwa Etomi - Wellington
2023	Shanty Town	Chief Fernandez	With Chidi Mokeme, Nse Ikpe Etim, Ini Edo

== Awards and nominations ==
Year	Event	Prize	Result
2009	5th Africa Movie Academy Awards	Best Film In Nigeria	Nominated
2012	2012 Best of Nollywood Awards	Special Recognition Award	Won
2015	2015 Africa Magic Viewers Choice Awards	Best Supporting Actor	Nominated
2016	12th Africa Movie Academy Awards	Lifetime Achievement Award	Won
2017	2017 Africa Magic Viewers Choice Awards	Best Actor in Leading Role	Nominated
2017	Africa Movie Academy Awards	Best Actor in Leading Role	Nominated
2017	Nigeria Entertainment Awards	Best Supporting Actor	Nominated
2018	Nollywood Travel Film Festival Awards	Most Outstanding Individual	Won
2021	Net Honours	Most Popular Actor	Nominated
2022	Exclusive Men of the Year Africa Awards	Continental Film Icon	Won
2023	Africa Magic Viewers' Choice Awards	Best Actor in a Drama, Movie or TV Series	Nominated

=== Other honours ===
- In 2014, the Nollywood Igbo Film Festival conferred an honorary chieftaincy title on Mofe-Damijo as a reward for his contributions to Igbo cinema.
