= The Wedding Party (2016 film) =

2016 film by Kemi Adetiba

- Theatrical release poster
- Directed by: Kemi Adetiba
- Screenplay by: Tosin Otudeko; Kemi Adetiba
- Produced by: Don Omope; Zulu Oyibo; Ijeoma Agukoronye
- Starring: Adesua Etomi; Banky Wellington; Richard Mofe Damijo; Sola Sobowale; Iretiola Doyle; Alibaba Akporobome; Zainab Balogun; Beverly Naya; Somkele Iyamah; Jumoke George; Enyinna Nwigwe; Ikechukwu Onunaku; Daniella Down; Stephen Damien
- Cinematography: Akpe Ododoru
- Edited by: Andrew Webber
- Music by: Dr. Bayo Adepetun; Michael "Truth" Ogunlade
- Production companies: Ebonylife Films; FilmOne; Inkblot Production; Koga Studios
- Distributed by: FilmOne Distributions
- Release dates: 8 September 2016 (TIFF); 26 November 2016 (Lagos); 16 December 2016 (Nigeria)
- Country: Nigeria
- Languages: English; Yoruba; Igbo
- Budget: ₦60 million
- Box office: ₦453,000,000

The Wedding Party is a 2016 Nigerian romantic comedy drama directed by Kemi Adetiba. It premiered on 8 September 2016 at the Toronto International Film Festival in Canada and on 26 November 2016 at Eko Hotel and Suites in Lagos. The film was released worldwide on 16 December 2016, and became the highest grossing Nigerian film; a record which was broken in 2021 by Omo Ghetto: The Saga.

== Plot ==
During the day of the wedding between Dunni Coker a 24-year-old art gallery owner who is the only daughter of Engineer Bamidele and Mrs. Tinuade Coker, and the IT entrepreneur Dozie Onwuka, who comes from a very wealthy family. His mother, Lady Obianuju Onwuka, considers her son to be marrying beneath himself.

On the morning before the wedding, the wedding party is prepared and the stressed wedding planner, Wonu is trying to make everything perfect for her rich clients. Meanwhile, the bride's parents and female relatives are upset by the omission of Tinuade Coker's name in the announcement in the paper, and the groom's parents share an uncomfortable breakfast while the mother talks disparagingly about the Coker family to her friends and is very cold towards her husband, Chief Felix Onwuka. Dunni is taunted by her female friends about her lack of sexual experience, and Dozie's male friends tease him about the previous night's bachelor's party. The best man had been in an accident after the bachelor's party, and the irresponsible Sola is chosen as his replacement.

During the wedding ceremony, guests and family are cheerful, with the exception of Obianuju Onwuka who pointedly refuses to pay any attention, to the embarrassment of Felix. Afterwards, while the cars are going from the ceremony to the party, Dunni finds a pair of women's underpants in the pocket of Dozie's dress jacket, and is upset. He convinces her that they had been planted there, probably by one of his friends, and they belatedly arrive at the party. A disagreement arises between the two pairs of parents about which group should enter the dining room first; eventually, the Onwukas, being the richer family, get the first entrance.

The dinner had its share of embarrassing incidents, including Tinuade Coker having hired a local Yoruba chef to cook an alternative to the fancy menu set by Obianuju Onwuka. When Sola gives his best man's speech, he accidentally shows video footage from the stag night instead of the video prepared by Dozie for the occasion, and the humiliated Dunni leaves the room after having witnessed what looks like Dozie being unfaithful to her. She is met outside the room by one of Dozie's old girlfriends, Rosie, who claims that she had sex with Dozie earlier that day - in reality, Rosie had tried to seduce him but failed. Dunni disappears from the venue in a taxi.

Dozie, his older brother Nonso, and the two sets of parents set out to look for Dunni but are held up at gunpoint by a thief who has managed to get into the room with the wedding gifts. The tense situation causes the couples to open up to each other, with Dozie's mother confessing to her husband how unhappy she had been about his affairs with younger women, and Dunni's father admitting that his company had lost all its money. The couples reconcile, and Nonso manages to overpower the thief and take his gun. Dozie goes off in a car with Sola to find Dunni, and convinces her that he has in fact not broken their mutual promise of chastity. They return to the wedding party to dance the rest of the night away.

== Cast ==
- Adesua Etomi as Dunni Coker (The Bride)
- Banky Wellington as Dozie Onwuka (The Groom)
- Richard Mofe Damijo as Chief Felix Onwuka (Father of the Groom)
- Sola Sobowale as Mrs. Tinuade Coker (Mother of the Bride)
- Iretiola Doyle as Lady Obianuju Onwuka (Mother of the Groom)
- Alibaba Akporobome as Engineer Bamidele Coker (Father of the Bride)
- Zainab Balogun as Wonu (The Wedding Planner)
- Enyinna Nwigwe as Nonso Onwuka (The Groom’s Brother)
- Somkele Iyamah-Idhalama as Yemisi Disu (Maid of Honour)
- Beverly Naya as Rosie (Groom's Ex-girlfriend)
- Daniella Down as Deadre Winston (Bridesmaid)
- Afeez Oyetoro as Ayanmale
- Ikechukwu Onunaku as Sola (Best Man)
- AY Makun as MC
- Emmanuel Edunjobi as Woli (The priest)
- Kunle Idowu as Harrison
- Jumoke George as Iya Michael
- Sambasa Nzeribe as Lukman

== Production ==
The film was produced by ELFIKE Film Collective. Directed by Kemi Adetiba. The ELFIKE Film Collective is a partnership of four major production houses in Nigeria: EbonyLife Films, FilmOne Distribution, Inkblot Productions and Koga Studios, respectively.

== Release ==
The film premiered in Toronto on 8 September 2016 at the Toronto International Film Festival (TIFF).

In August 2017, the film was made available on Netflix.

== Critical reception ==
The Wedding Party has received favourable reviews from critics. According to Chidumga Izuzu of Pulse Nigeria, "It is distinctly a comedy movie that sets out to entertain. The film does not attempt to fit into multiple genres such as action, thriller, crime, adventure, or documentary all at once. It doesn't set out to be deep and have you feeling 'intense'. It understands its chosen genre, and it sticks to it".

Nollywood Reinvented rated the film 54% and stated, "As a movie lover, I will be watching this again within the next 7 days. As a critic... once we get past the party it's a cheese fest."

Cinema Axis' Courtney Small stated, "The Wedding Party may not offer many surprises from a narrative standpoint, but there is no denying that the film is a pure crowd-pleaser. Generating many well-earned belly laughs, it is impossible to leave the film without a huge smile on one’s face."

Isabella Akinseye praised and as well criticized the film.

Wilfred Okiche of ynaija has this to say about Kemi Adetiba and her role as director; "Apart from some red flags, like the overbearing wedding speech by the father of the groom for instance, the haves and haves not sub plot involving Sambassa Nzeribe, and the entire existence of Hafiz Oyetoro’s gate crashing character, Adetiba keeps things moving briskly".

Temitope Adeiye of thenet.ng stated that The Wedding Party was "one of the best movies I saw in 2016".

== See also ==
- The Wedding Party, 2017
- List of highest-grossing Nigerian films
- List of Nigerian films of 2016
