= Alibaba Akpobome =

Nigerian stand-up comedian (born 1965)

- Born: Atunyota Alleluya Akpobome; 24 June 1965 (age 61)
- Other names: Alibaba, Alibaba Nigerian Comedian
- Education: Ambrose Alli University
- Spouse: Mary Akpobome

Comedy career
- Years active: 1991–present

Atunyota Alleluya Akpobome (born 24 June 1965), known professionally as Ali Baba, is a Nigerian stand-up comedian, master of ceremonies and actor.

== Early life ==
Ali Baba was born in Agbarha otor, Delta State, Nigeria on 24 June 1965, to the royal family of Agbarha Otor. He is the first son of several children and spent his first 8 years in Warri, Delta State. His father is a retired soldier who served in Lagos.

== Education ==
He attended Command Secondary School, Ipaja, Lagos State, and Ibru College Agbarha-Otor, Delta State. He attended Bendel State University (now Ambrose Alli University), Ekpoma and graduated with a degree in Religious Studies & Philosophy.He was neighbour to Pastor Chris Oyakhilome while at school in university.

== Career ==
After completing his academic degree in 1990, he relocated back to Lagos, to develop his comedy talent he discovered at the university. Originally, he planned to study Law but decided he could be more successful by making people laugh than by defending them.

== Professional career ==
He began his professional career performing at corporate events, appearing on television shows with Patrick Doyle, Charly Boy, and Danladi Bako, and making cameo appearances on radio shows with Bisi Olatilo, Sani Irabor, and Mani Onumonmu. He also worked with Prince Adedapo Benjamin Adelegan of DP Lekki Limited as executive assistant in 1991.

In 2014, Ali Baba started an annual comedy event called the 1 January concert. Comedians come up to review the events of the previous year and a first-class graduate from the preceding year receives an award.

In 2015, he started an event called Spontaneity; a quarterly event for budding comedians. Notable among the finalists of this competition is Woli Arole at the 2016 edition.

Ali Baba maintains the philosophy that his business is big enough for all who want to make comedy their chosen profession. As such, he supports, mentors, and presents several comedians helping to ensure that standards are maintained, and professionalism encouraged.

== Awards ==
Year	Awards	Categories
2001	Laughter Awards – Baziks Theatre Abuja	Outstanding Performance
2002	Laughter Incorporated	Immense contribution to the comedy Industry
2003	Delta State University	Achievers Merit Award
2004	Pendulum Awards LASU National Association of Physics Student	Icon of Comedy
2004	1st Nigeria Entertainment Awards	Icon of Comedy
2005	National Comedy Award	Comedy Enterprise
2006	Eric's Entertainment Inc	Recognition of his solid support to young entrepreneurs
2006	Lagos State University	Award of Excellence
2006	City People Entertainment	Invaluable contribution to the Entertainment Industry
2007	RCCG	Enablers Merit Award
2008	The News	For turning stand-up comedy into a viable business
2008	Diamond Award for Comedy	For helping the growth & development of the Comedy Industry in Nigeria
2009	City People Entertainment	Invaluable contribution to the Entertainment Industry
2009	National Daily Award	Comedian of the decade
2010	Comedy for Change	In commemoration of his 20 years on stage

== Recognition ==
Ali Baba was inducted into the Johnnie Walker 'Striding Man' Society in 2009 which recognizes men who have achieved great strides in their chosen fields and who motivate and encourage others

In 2012, he rang the Year End Closing Bell of the Nigerian Stock Exchange, the first Nigerian comedian to do so.

He is a Special Marshal of the Federal Road Safety Corps.

In March 2015, Ali Baba was featured on CNN African voices, speaking about his goal to professionalize and gain acceptance for Nigerian comedians.

In April 2018, Ali Baba received the Paul Harris Fellowship by Rotary International for his contribution to the Nigerian Comedy industry

== Personal life ==
Ali Baba is married to Mary Akpobome.

== Filmography ==
- My Guy (1999)
- The Last 3 Digits (2014)
- Head Gone (2014)
- The Wedding Party (2016)
- Alakada (2017)
- Gold Statue (2019) as Mr. Manuel
- The Man for the Job (2022) as Lai

== See also ==
- List of Nigerian comedians
