= Merry Men (film series) =

Action film series

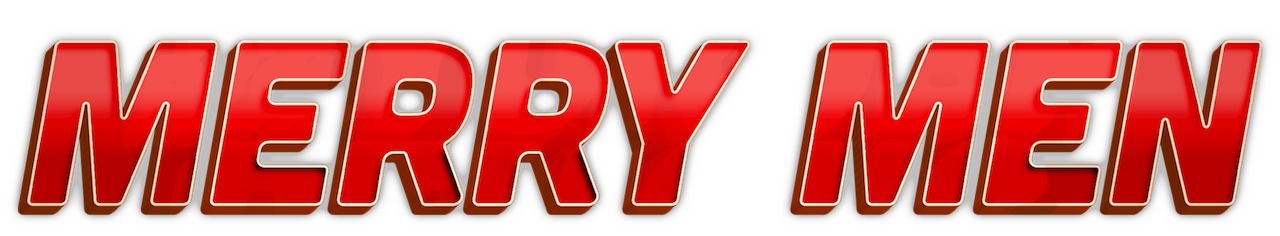
- Official film series logo
- Based on: Merry Men: The Real Yoruba Demons by Ayo Makun
- Produced by: Darlington Abuda; Ayo Makun; Patrick Ovoke Odjegba (1–3)
- Starring: Ayo Makun; Ramsey Nouah; Jim Iyke
- Production company: Corporate World Entertainment
- Distributed by: FilmOne Distributions
- Release dates: September 28, 2018 (1); December 20, 2019 (2); January 18, 2024 (3)
- Running time: 332 minutes
- Country: Nigeria
- Language: English

Merry Men film series is a Nigerian action comedy film franchise created by Ay Makun, produced under the banner of Corporate World Entertainment, and distributed by Filmone Distribution. The series comprises three films: Merry Men: The Real Yoruba Demons (2018), Merry Men 2: Another Mission (2019), and Merry Men 3: Nemesis (2024). Known for its mix of humor, action, and social commentary, the series has gained significant attention in Nollywood, featuring an ensemble cast of Nigerians.

Starting in 2018, the film introduces a group of wealthy and charismatic bachelors known as the "Merry Men." These four friends, Amaju Abioritsegbemi (played by Ayo Makun), Remi Martin (Ramsey Nouah), Naz Okigbo (Jim Iyke), and Ayo Alesinloye (Folarin Falana, aka Falz) use their charm and resources to navigate high society while covertly engaging in philanthropy. However, their playboy lifestyle is challenged when they face a powerful politician and a high-stakes land-grabbing scheme.

The series has experienced a generally positive and negative reception from critics. Both Merry Men: The Real Yoruba Demons and Merry Men 2: Another Mission were commercial success in Nigeria, ranking among the highest-grossing Nigerian films of their respective years.

== Films ==
Film	Release date	Director	Screenwriter(s)	Story by	Producers	Status
Merry Men: The Real Yoruba Demons	September 28, 2018	Toka McBaror	Anthony Kehinde Joseph	Ay Makun	Ay Makun & Darlington Abuda	Released
Merry Men 2: Another Mission	December 20, 2019	Moses Inwang	Anthony Kehinde Joseph	Ay Makun	Ay Makun & Darlington Abuda	Released
Merry Men 3: Nemesis	January 18, 2024	Moses Inwang	Ay Makun & Anthony Kehinde Joseph	Ay Makun & Anthony Kehinde Joseph	Ay Makun & Darlington Abuda	Released

=== Merry Men: The Real Yoruba Demons (2018) ===
Directed by Toka McBaror, the first film introduces the titular Merry Men: Ayo Alesinloye (played by Ay Makun), Naz Okigbo (Jim Iyke), Remi Martins (Falz), and Amaju Abioritsegbemi (Ramsey Nouah). The plot follows the group as they attempt to thwart the corrupt plans of a powerful politician threatening the livelihoods of local villagers. The film blends heist elements with comedy and cultural references, earning commercial success and praise for its star-studded cast.

=== Merry Men 2: Another Mission (2019) ===
The sequel, also directed by Moses Inwang, sees the return of the Merry Men as they face personal and professional challenges. This time, their mission is more personal as they confront an adversary seeking revenge for past deeds. The film explores themes of loyalty, love, and redemption while retaining the humor and action that defined the first installment.

=== Merry Men 3: Nemesis (2024) ===
The third film in the series, directed by Moses Inwang, is slated for release in December 2024. The plot details are under wraps, but it promises to continue the Merry Men's adventures with higher stakes and more elaborate schemes. New cast members and a heightened focus on action have been teased in promotional materials.

== Cast and characters ==
List indicators

This section includes characters who will appear or have appeared in the Merry men film series.

- An empty grey cell indicates the character was not in the film, or that the character's official presence has not yet been confirmed.
- ^{C} indicates a cameo role.
- ^{P} indicates an appearance in onscreen photographs.

Overview of Merry Men cast and crew
Character
Character	Merry Men: The Real Yoruba Demons	Merry Men 2: Another Mission	Merry Men 3: Nemesis
Amaju Abioritsegbemi	Ayo Makun	Ayo Makun	Ayo Makun
Ayo Alesinloye	Ramsey Nouah	Ramsey Nouah	Ramsey Nouah
Naz Okigbo	Jim Iyke	Jim Iyke	
Remi Martins	Folarin "Falz" Falana	Folarin "Falz" Falana	
Dame Maduka	Ireti Doyle	Ireti Doyle	Ireti Doyle
Sophie	Nancy Isime	Nancy Isime	
Dera Chukwu	Damilola Adegbite	Damilola Adegbite	Damilola Adegbite
Kenya Obi	Regina Daniels	Regina Daniels	Regina Daniels
Johnny	Uchemba Williams	Uchemba Williams	Uchemba Williams
Kemi Alesinloye	Rosaline Meurer	Rosaline Meurer	
Mrs Anyanwu	Lilian Esoro		
Chidinma (blogger)	Osas Ighodaro		
Inspector Cross Omisore	Segun Arinze	Segun Arinze	Segun Arinze
Inspector Jack	Francis Duru		
Uduak Francis	Sam Dede	Sam Dede	Sam Dede
Olamide	Himself		
Dafe	Chidi Mokeme	Chidi Mokeme	Chidi Mokeme
