= Alex Asogwa =

Nigerian reality TV personality and actress

- Born: Alexandra Amuche Sandra Asogwa; 15 February 1996 (age 30); Nsukka, Enugu
- Other name: Alex Unusual
- Education: New York Film Academy
- Occupations: TV personality; actress; model; compere
- Years active: 2016–present
- Television: Big Brother Nigeria; Merry Men 2; Fate of Alakada
- Modeling information
- Height: 5 ft 11 in (180 cm)
- Hair color: Black
- Eye color: Brown

Alexandra Amuche Sandra Asogwa // (born 15 February 1996), also known as Alex Unusual, is a Nigerian reality television personality, model, actress, and media personality.

She gained recognition after participating in the 2018 edition of Big Brother Naija season 3 reality TV show, where she finished as third runner-up and was voted as the most fun housemate. She has also appeared in Nollywood films such as Merry Men 2, Fate of Alakada and Nucleus.

== Early life and education ==
Asogwa was born in Enugu State and is from Nsukka. She is the eldest of three siblings.

She began her early education in Enugu but received her first school leaving certificate from Aunty Lizzy International School, Lagos in 2006, after her family relocated to Lagos in 2001. She completed her senior secondary education at Federal Government College, Enugu. While in school, she competed in track and field events, particularly relays, and won several prizes. Asogwa studied at the New York Film Academy where she received training in directing and content creation.

== Career ==
Asogwa appeared in a Nestlé baby food television campaign in 1996 when she was six months old. In 2016, she competed in the Miss Eastern Nigeria beauty pageant in 2016 and was crowned the winner. She hosted the red carpet at the Nigerian premiere of Avengers: Endgame for Marvel Studios. She also co-anchored Lanre Olusola's book launch with fellow actor Deyemi Okanlawon.

In 2019, Asogwa hosted the red carpet premieres of Merry Men 2 and the Buckwyld and Breathless shows. She made her acting debut in Merry Men 2, a sequel to Merry Men: The Real Yoruba Demons that starred Ayo Makun, Jim Iyke, Ufuoma McDermott, Rosaline Meurer and Linda Osifo. She also featured in Power of 1 and Fate of Alakada.

Asogwa produced and directed the short film Nucleus, in which she starred alongside Ngozi Nwosu.

=== Big Brother Naija ===
In 2018, Asogwa was a finalist of Big Brother Naija season 3, alongside Miracle, Cee C, Tobi and Nina. She finished as the third runner-up.

== Personal life ==
Asogwa resides in Lagos. She has been involved in charitable activities, including awarding scholarships to orphans and raising funds for cancer awareness.

== Filmography ==
=== Films ===
Year	Title	Role	Notes
2018	Power of 1	Herself	cameo; also starring Alexx Ekubo, Ramsey Nouah and Annie Idibia
2019	Merry Men 2	Calypso	also starring, Jim Iyke, Falz, Ireti Doyle, Damilola Adegbite, Ufuoma McDermott, Rosaline Meurer, Nancy Isime and Linda Osifo
2020	Fate of Alakada	Herself	also starring Toyin Abraham, Mercy Eke and Broda Shaggi
2021	Nucleus	Daughter	also the producer and director; also starring Ngozi Nwosu; short film

=== Television ===
Year	Title	Role	Notes	Status
2018	Big Brother Naija 3	Contestant	Reality Show Game Show	4th Place
2023	Big Brother Naija 8 All Stars	Contestant	Reality Show Game Show	10th Place

== See also ==
- List of Nigerian actresses
