= Merry Men 3 =

2023 Nigeria action film

Merry Men 3: Nemesis
- Theatrical release poster
- Directed by: Moses Inwang
- Screenplay by: Anthony Kehinde Joseph
- Story by: Ayo Makun
- Produced by: Darlington Abuda
- Starring: Ramsey Nouah; Ayo Makun; Jim Iyke; Falz; Ireti Doyle; Damilola Adegbite; Ufuoma McDermott; Nancy Isime; Linda Osifo
- Cinematography: Wesley Johnston
- Production companies: FilmOne Entertainment; Gush Media
- Distributed by: FilmOne Distribution; Netflix
- Release date: 2023
- Country: Nigeria
- Languages: English; Yoruba; Pidgin

Merry Men 3: Nemesis is a 2023 crime action comedy film produced by Filmone Distribution and released on Netflix. Written by Jeffery Musa David, Ayo Makun, and Darlington Abuda, and directed by Moses Inwang, it serves as the third installment in the Merry Men franchise, following Merry Men and Merry Men 2. The film continues the story of the charismatic and affluent group known as the Merry Men, who use their skills, resources, and cunning to take on corrupt politicians and criminals. Ayo Makun, Ramsey Nouah, Uchemba Williams, and Falz return to reprise their roles from the previous films.

== Plot ==
Merry Men 3: Nemesis picks up from where the second film (Merry Men 2: Another Mission) left off. In this installment, the Merry Men—Ayo Alesinloye (played by Ramsey Nouah), Naz Okigbo (played by Jim Iyke), Amaju Abioritsegbemi (played by Ayo Makun), and Remi Martins (played by Falz)—are faced with their most dangerous challenge yet.

The Merry Men, who have become known for their Robin Hood-like exploits in taking down corrupt individuals, are targeted by a mysterious nemesis seeking revenge for their past actions. The men find themselves embroiled in a series of events that not only put their lives at risk but also challenge their loyalty to one another.

== Cast ==
- Ramsey Nouah as Ayo Alesinloye
- Jim Iyke as Naz Okigbo
- Ayo Makun as Amaju Abioritsegbemi
- Falz as Remi Martins
- Ireti Doyle as Dame Maduka
- Damilola Adegbite as Dera
- Nancy Isime as Sophie
- Nqobile Khumalo as Amieka
- Regina Daniels
- Sam Dede as Uduak Francis
- Nadia Buari as Dera
- Joshua L. Eady as Frederick
- Alphonso A'Qen-Aten Jackson as Mpho
- Caroline Danjuma as Doctor Ejiro
- Segun Arinze as Inspector Cross Omisore
- April Chidinma as Sophie
- Uchemba Williams as Johnny
- Iyabo Ojo as Dep Stella
- Chidi Mokeme as Dafe
- Bucci Franklin as Jonas

== Production ==
Merry Men 3: Nemesis was directed by Moses Inwang, a filmmaker known for his expertise in action films. The movie was produced by FilmOne Distribution’s production company, which has a history of successful Nollywood productions, including the previous Merry Men films.

=== Filming ===
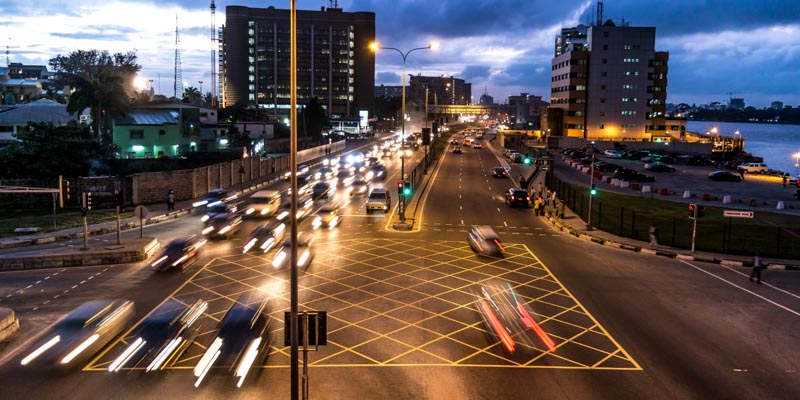
One Of Merry Men 3 Filming Location, Lagos Lekki

Principal photography for Merry Men 3 took place from February 2023 to May 10, 2023. Filming occurred in various high-end, undisclosed locations around Lagos and Abuja, highlighting the luxurious lifestyle of the Merry Men while maintaining the fast-paced action that is a hallmark of the series.

The film is noted for its state-of-the-art special effects and fight choreography, making it one of the more technically ambitious projects in Nollywood. It also introduced new cast members, including Nadia Buari and Sam Dede. Adekunle Adejuyigbe, who worked on the first installment, returned as a cinematographer, collaborating with Wesley Johnston on this project.

== Release ==
The film premiered in cinemas on October 13, 2023, and was released on Netflix on January 18, 2024.

== Reception ==
=== Box office ===
Merry Men 3 earned ₦18.6 million during its opening weekend, followed by an additional ₦14.8 million from October 16 to October 19, 2023, bringing its total earnings to ₦33.4 million against its production budget. By its third weekend in October 2023, the film had grossed ₦75.4 million, according to the Cinema Exhibitors Association of Nigeria (CEAN). During its fourth weekend, at the start of November 2023, Merry Men 3 surpassed ₦100 million in total earnings and reached a peak ranking of No. 3 at the box office.

=== Critical response ===
Negative reviews pointed out that the film's plot felt like a repetition of the second installment. Shola Adido Oladotun of Premium Times remarked, "The film comes off as what happens when a writer watches too many action films and picks a trope from each without any creative spin." He also noted, "Merry Men 3 fell from grace to grass. While the trilogy started with a strong first film, the third—and hopefully final—installment fails to deliver." However, Oladotun did praise the film's action sequences, stating, "The fighting scenes were intense, which is a good thing. The characters showed mastery of stunt moves accompanied by nice special effects." He ultimately rated the film 3 out of 10 stars. Daily Trust also published a negative review, highlighting the film's "lack of clarity." They wrote, "Merry Men 3 suffers primarily from a lack of clarity in various aspects of its plot, leading to inconsistencies as the story unfolds. The central conflict, in particular, is problematic. While the film offers moments of excitement, it is marred by numerous plot holes and unresolved details, leaving several loose ends. Furthermore, the progression of the story renders some characters irrelevant, resulting in a film that ultimately feels dull and aimless."

Other positive responses include a review from Culture Custodian, where they commended Chidi Mokeme’s performance, stating, "Chidi Mokeme’s acting is decent, with his scarred, hairy face and commanding gait fitting the role of a villain." However, they questioned the believability of his character Dafe's intelligence, adding, "It’s hard to accept Dafe as a clever antagonist. For instance, why would a supposedly trained killer fire multiple shots to the chest at close range when a single shot to the head would have sufficed?" They concluded by noting, "The franchise has now become like an adventurer who has fallen off a cliff, turning itself into a spectacle.

Victory Hayzard Solum of AfroCritik awarded the film 1.5 stars out of 5, remarking, "Whatever glimpses of excellence Merry Men 3: Nemesis offers are quickly overshadowed by its reliance on uninspired humor. Perhaps the film's biggest joke, if any, is that it exists at all." Despite the critique, Solum praised some of the cast members, highlighting Ufuoma McDermott's performance, stating that she "once again proves she can hold her own as a dramatic lead in an action movie." He also commended Ireti Doyle, noting that she "never disappoints as the ever-mocking Dame Maduka, delivering biting insults in Igbo."
