= Danieline Moore =

Liberian actress, entrepreneur

- Born: Danieline Moore; Liberia
- Occupations: Actress • Entrepreneur
- Known for: Pageance: Winner, Miss Liberia USA (2007) • Acting: Crazy in Love (2010)
- Spouse: Kamya (m. 2017)

Danieline Moore Kamya is a Liberian actress and entrepreneur. In 2007, she became the Miss Liberia USA. She is equally a spokesperson for the Africa Environment Watch.

== Personal life ==
She has been married to Kamya, a long-time partner of hers since 2017.

== Career ==
=== Beauty pageantry ===
Winner of Miss Liberia USA 2007

Miss Liberia Maryland 2005

She won the pageantry the following year.

=== Acting ===
Moore featured in the following movies, "Crazy in Love", which also starred Nollywood actors like Jim Iyke, Altorro Black and Crystal Milian. The movie was premiered in Beltsville, Maryland, United States. The event was attended by many Nollywood stars including Ramsey Nouah.

“Yori yori Baby “, which also starred Nollywood actors like Nadia Buari, Ramsey Nouah

Faithfullness, which also starred Nollywood actors like Jim Iyke.

=== Business ===
She runs chains of luxury fashion boutiques; Nalu Boutique, Nalu Couture and Glitz by Nalu, which is named after her stepdaughter. She is also the founder of D. K. M. Cosmetics and the VIXEN clothing line in Liberia.

== Filmography ==
Year	Title	Role	Notes
2010	Crazy in Love		

Yori Yori Baby 2010

Faithfulness 2011
