= Ordinary People (2026 TV series) =

2026 Nigerian television series

- Genre: Action thriller
- Created by: Moses Inwang
- Directed by: Moses Inwang
- Composer: Shiloh Godson
- Country of origin: Nigeria
- Original language: English
- No. of episodes: 8

Original release
- Network: Netflix
- Release: 4 September 2026

Ordinary People is a 2026 Nigerian action thriller television series directed by Moses Inwang. Set in an upscale Lagos estate, the series follows residents whose seemingly ordinary lives conceal criminal pasts, secret identities and personal conflicts. It stars Ramsey Nouah, Adunni Ade, Shawn Faqua, Chidi Mokeme, Michelle Dede, Sharon Ooja, Uche Montana, Lasisi Elenu and Jackie Appiah. The eight-episode series premiered on Netflix on 4 September 2026.

== Plot ==
The series begins in 2017 when armed police attack the home of Tornado, a Niger Delta crime lord, during a baptism. Tornado and his wife survive and later settle in Mirage Estate, Lagos, where they present themselves as an ordinary couple.

Dare Laguda moves into the estate and begins secretly monitoring its residents. Among them are two intelligence officers working undercover, a Nollywood actress dealing with personal problems, a comedian whose marriage is troubled by domestic abuse, and a Ghanaian couple hiding a fraud case. Other residents also have secrets of their own.

Dare's surveillance eventually brings him into contact with Tornado's plans and the activities of the other residents.

== Cast ==
- Ramsey Nouah
- Adunni Ade
- Shawn Faqua
- Chidi Mokeme
- Michelle Dede
- Sharon Ooja
- Uche Montana
- Lasisi Elenu
- Jackie Appiah
- Eddy Watson
- Adjetey Anang
- Gbenga Titiloye
- Bimbo Manuel
- Aproko Doctor
- Randa Eissa
- Stanley Evans
- Margaret Echeghe

== Production ==
Inwang conceived Ordinary People during the COVID-19 pandemic lockdown after considering whether neighbours who appeared friendly might conceal darker lives. He began developing the project in 2020 and started the screenplay in 2023. According to Inwang, the story developed into several interconnected plots and subplots, making a television series more suitable than a feature film. He also said the series was intended to address social issues including mental health and domestic violence.

The series was filmed over three years in Lagos, Bayelsa and Berlin, Germany. Its ensemble cast includes Nigerian and Ghanaian actors.

The series premiered globally on Netflix on 4 September 2026, with eight episodes.

== Music ==
Shiloh Godson composed the score for Ordinary People. it marked his first collaboration with director Moses Inwang. Rather than beginning with the first episode, Godson began composing the score with the sixth episode.

The music features character-focused motifs, strings, guitars and experimental sounds, including power-bike revving, ethnic drums and vocal wails, to underscore the series' drama. Godson said the score combined choristers' unsettling wails, which evoked spirituality with forceful strings that conveyed violence. Ordinary People, Vol.1 was released on September, 4, 2025.

== Reception ==
Emmanuel Muna of Premium Times criticised the series for having too many storylines, while praising the performances of Ramsey Nouah and Adunni Ade. Shalom O. Obisesan of NollyCritic praised the premise and cast but criticised the series' execution, pacing and narration. Esther Kalu of The Nollywood Reporter praised Shiloh Godson's music score, and cinematography but criticised the series' reliance on dialogue and exposition. Henri Enoh Tchato of Critical Registrar rated the series 1.5/5 and criticised its excessive narration, implausible hacking and large number of characters. Sunday Okobi of This Day also praised the music score as one of the most distinctive aspect of the series.
