= Kingsley Abasili =

Nigerian actor

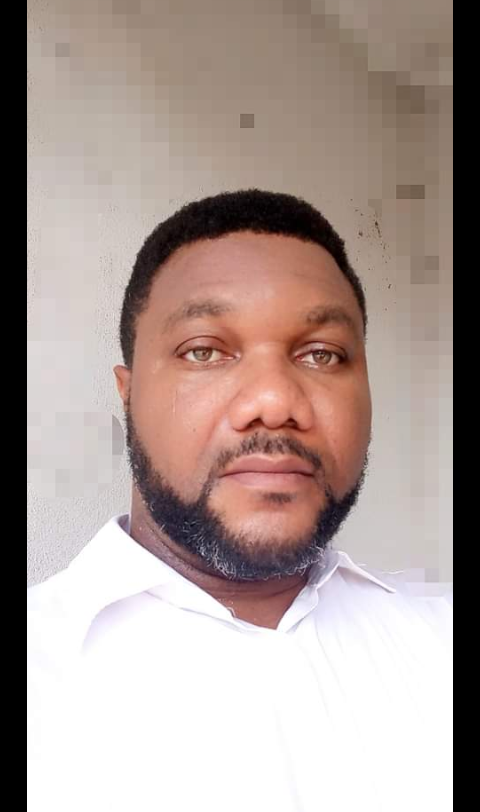
- Born: Kingsley Nkemjika Abasili; Makurdi, Benue State, Nigeria
- Education: University of Port Harcourt; Ebonyi State University
- Occupation: Actor
- Years active: 2019–present
- Known for: Resemblance to Pete Edochie
- Awards: Anambra through a lens recognition award

Kingsley Nkemjika Abasili // is a Nigerian actor and lecturer at Nnamdi Azikiwe University, Anambra State, Nigeria. He is known for his striking resemblance to veteran actor Pete Edochie. Both actors are from Anambra State but they are not related.

== Biography ==
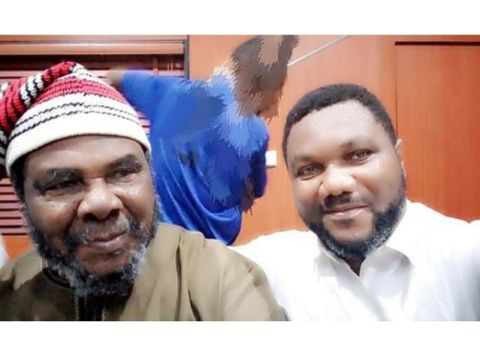
Pete Edochie and Lookalike son Kingsley Abasili

Abasili is from Igbo-Ukwu, a town in Aguata local government area of Anambra State in the Southeastern region of Nigeria. He was born in Makurdi, Benue State, Nigeria.

=== Education ===
He has a bachelor's degree in Public Administration, from Ebonyi State University, Abakaliki. On March 25, 2017, he convocated alongside other postgraduate students in the department of Political and Administrative Studies – International Relations (master's degree), faculty of Social Sciences, University of Port Harcourt, Rivers State.

=== Career ===
In 2019, Abasili attracted media attention for his resemblance to the veteran actor Pete Edochie. Abasili looks like the younger version of Edochie and has been called his doppelganger.

Subsequently, Abasili joined the Nigeria film industry in the same year and has since featured alongside Nollywood actors such as Gentle Jack and Emmanuel Ehumadu, known as Labistar. In 2019, he featured in Try Me as School Principal in Mark Angel's short comedy skit alongside Dominion Uche and others.

== Filmography ==
Filmography
Date	Title	Genre	Role	Selected cast	Ref.
2020	Throne of Madness	Drama	Ichie Odinaka	Chizzy Alichi; Joyce Kalu; Stephen Odimgbe	
2020	5G Network	Drama	Derrick	Chiwetalu Agu; Chinyere Nwabueze; Segun Success; Jude Oolnoriode	
2020	Unroyal	Comedy; Romance	Elder in Council	Pete Edochie; Emem Inwang; Shaffy Bello; Blossom Chukwujekwu	
2020	Behind the Chaplet	Drama	Presido	Patience Ozokwor; Francis Odok; Kenneth Kanu	
2019	Try Me	YouTube Video; Short; Comedy	School Principal	Dominion Uche; Mark Angel	
2020	Anambra Through a Lens	Talk show	Guest		

== Recognition ==
Abasili was invited to the Akaraka event as a guest and was honored with a recognition award by Anambra Through a Lens in 2020 alongside other recipients, including Chief Press Secretary to Anambra state Governor and Sir James Eze. Honourable Commissioner for Youth and Digital Economy, Hon. Afam Mbanefo presented the award to the recipients.

== Publications ==
- Glocalization and the Politics of Poverty Alleviation in Nigeria's Covid-19 Era
