= Shiloh Godson =

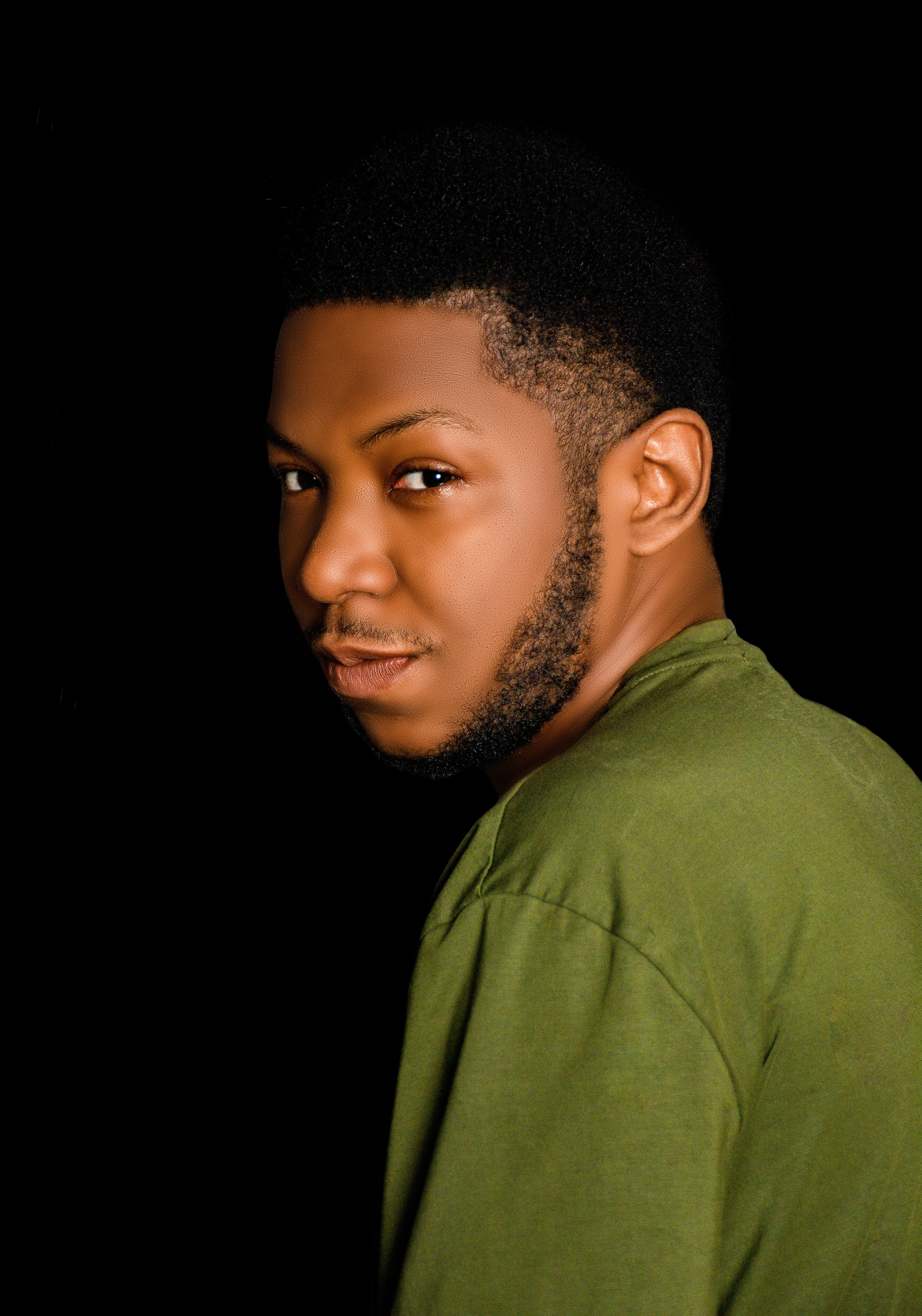
- Godson in 2023

Background information
- Born: Shiloh Kelechi Godson; 14 March 1993 (age 33); Kano, Nigeria
- Genres: Film scores; classical; Afrobeat; afropop; R&B; R&B; hip hop
- Occupations: Composer; Record producer; Sound Designer
- Years active: 2019–present
- Label: Hush Sounds

Shiloh Godson (born 14 March 1993) is a Nigerian born film score composer, music composer, recording engineer and sound designer. His work has been used in films and he has been nominated for multiple awards including an Africa Magic Viewers’ Choice Award.

Godson has gained recognition for his work on various films, including Blackmail, Badamasi, Safari, Out of Breath and Ordinary People.

He frequently works with other collaborators through the company that he founded, Hush Sounds Productions.

== Career ==
Godson began playing drums at the age of seven. By thirteen, he was performing professionally as a pianist. He continued developing his musical and technical skills while recording business conferences, radio broadcasts and religious events during his high school years. At University he worked as a record producer and audio engineer with Discovery Studios.

In 2018, Godson joined Afromedia Hub Studios as a record producer and mixing engineer. During this time, He also worked as a sound engineer for large live events including The Experience Lagos.

Godson's early film project was Badamasi, directed by Obi Emelonye. For the film he received credit as Sound designer. The film's depiction of military rule, coups and the Nigerian civil war required large-scale sound effects and atmospheric soundscapes. According to some accounts Godson recorded as many as four armored tanks for the sound design, the film got two African Movie Academy Award nominations.

Godson's film work also includes The Oratory, Money Miss Road, Blackmail, Blindspots, Out of Breath, Safari as well as being the composer for the Netflix Series Ordinary People.

According to some accounts on Out of Breath, Godson traveled to rural Imo State to record local drummers, traditional singers and traditional flute players for the film's score. This was in 2023 amid severe insecurity in the State, including shootings and kidnappings, with an account detailing several gunshots while returning from a recording session, including one directed at his vehicle.

Godson founded the film scoring and sound design company Hush Sounds productions in 2021.

== Early Life and Education ==
Godson was born in Kano State, Nigeria. He has a Biochemistry degree from the University of Calabar, and a degree from Berklee College of Music.

== Awards and nominations ==
In 2023, Godson was nominated for an Africa Magic Viewers' Choice Awards (AMVCA) for Best Sound Editor in Blackmail, and the film was nominated for the Best Feature Film category at the 2021 British Urban Film Festival (BUFF) and won an African movie academy award.

His work on Badamasi was nominated for two Africa Movie Academy Awards., He was also nominated in 2025 for Best Score by Red Movie awards for his work on Blindspots.

His work on Money Miss Road (2022) got nominated in 2022 for four Africa Movie Academy Awards, including National Film & Video Censors Board (NFVCB) Award for Best Nigerian Film and Michael Anyiam Osigwe Award for Best Film by an African-born Director Living Abroad.

His work on Out of Breath got nine African Movie Academy Award nominations.

Godson composed the musical score for the 2026 Netflix action thriller series Ordinary People. In departure from the traditional scoring workflows, Godson began composing the music starting from the sixth episode of the series rather than the first. To underscore the series' dramatic tension, the score utilizes character-focused motifs and a blend of strings and electric guitars, integrated with experimental sounds such as power-bike revving, West African tribal drums and vocal wails. The music received positive critical reception, with The Nollywood Reporter praising Godson's score as the strength of the series. Sunday Okobi of This Day also identified the score as the most distinctive aspect of the series.

== Filmography ==
- Badamasi (2021)
- The Oratory (2021)
- Date Night (2022)
- Johnny Jackson's Story (2022)
- Money Miss Road (2022)
- Bigger fish (2023)
- Blackmail (2023)
- Blindspots (2024)
- Max and Sadie (2024)
- Troublous Weekend (2024)
- Everyday with you (2024)
- Out of Breath (2024)
- Safari (2025)
- Ordinary People (2026)
