= Last Request =

Last Request may refer to:

- Last Request (2006 film), an American comedy written and directed by John DeBellis
- Last Request (2019 film), a Nigerian film produced by Moses Olufemi and directed by James Abinibi
- "Last Request" (song), a 2006 song by Paolo Nutini
- "Last Request", a song by Day to Remember from their 2004 EP Halos for Heros, Dirt for the Dead
