= Tòkunbò =

2024 Nigerian action film

- Promotional release poster
- Directed by: Ramsey Nouah
- Written by: Todimu Adegoke; Thecla Uzozie
- Produced by: Joy Odiete; David Karanja
- Starring: Adunni Ade; Gideon Okeke; Tosin Adeyemi; Funlola Aofiyebi-Raimi
- Cinematography: Muhammad Atta Ahmed
- Edited by: John Harry; Ayodele Onyekachi Banjo; Essien Nsisong
- Music by: Rex Ricketts
- Production companies: Ramsey Films; Sozo Films
- Distributed by: Netflix
- Release date: 23 August 2024
- Running time: 112 minutes
- Country: Nigeria
- Languages: English; Yoruba; Nigerian Pidgin; Igbo
- Budget: $200,000

Tòkunbò is a 2024 Nigerian Action drama film distributed by Netflix. The film was directed by Ramsey Nouah and produced by Joy Odiete and Chris Odeh. It was filmed in Nigeria and Sèmè the Republic of Benin. The film stars Gideon Okeke in the lead role, alongside Chidi Mokeme, Norbert Young, Funlola Aofiyebi-Raimi, Stanley Chibunna, and Darasimi Nadi.

Tòkunbò was released on Netflix on August 23, 2024, by Ramsey Films Productions.

== Plot ==
The film Tòkunbò centers on the life of its character, Tòkunbò, (Gideon Okeke) who initially delivers illegal cars to a notorious gangster named Gaza (Chidi Mokeme) while anxiously awaiting the birth of his child. Witnessing Gaza's violent nature, Tòkunbò decides to leave his life of crime behind and focus on his wife, Lisa, and their newborn son, Chris.

Eighteen months later, Tòkunbò who now works as a cab driver, struggling to provide for his family and ensure that Chris receives the necessary medical treatment for his heart transplant. However, his earnings are insufficient, forcing him to seek financial help from Gaza once more. When Gaza refuses, Tòkunbò returns to driving his cab, where he stumbles upon a cell phone left behind by a transporter who delivers illegal goods for substantial sums of money.

Seizing the opportunity, Tòkunbò assumes the identity of the transporter and begins making deliveries. His resolve wavers when he is tasked with transporting a young girl named Nike (Darasimi Nadi) to the Sèmè Border.

As the situation unfolds, it is revealed that Nike is the daughter of Central Bank Governor Folashade (Funlola Aofiyebi-Raimi), who initiates a full-scale operation upon learning of her daughter's abduction.

== Cast ==
- Gideon Okeke as Tòkunbọ̀
- Norbert Young as ASP Salim
- Chidi Mokeme as Gaza
- Funlola Aofiyebi-Raimi as Folashade
- Darasimi Nadii as Nike
- Chibunna Stanley (Funny Bone) as Chukwudi
- Majid Michel as Raymond/Agba
- Adunni Ade as Iya Mulika
- Ivie Okujaye as Aziba
- Arron Sunday as Gabriel Ayoola
- Micheal Smith as Bankole Smith
- Tosin Adeyemi as Lisa
- Tunbosun Aiyedehin as Aunty Yetunde
- Tolu Devine as Jubril
- Omonua Akhigbe Kelvin as Uncle Jay
- Babalola Opeyemi Ezekiel as Godwin

== Music ==
Tòkunbò

Soundtrack album by Rex Ricketts
- Released: 2024
- Length: 3:10
- Language: English
- Producer: Dashey

The film's soundtrack is composed by Rex Ricketts, while the background scores are composed by DJ Neptune, Patoranking Peter Akor (GunzZ), and Prettyboy D-O. The first single "Gaza" was released on September 24, 2021.

Track list
No.	Title	Writer(s)	Singer(s)	Length
1.	"Gaza"	Yung Willis, Patrick Nnaemeka Okorie, Williams Daniel Shekwoyemi, Patrick Imohiosen	DJ Neptune, Patoranking	2:47
2.	"Home"	Rex Ricketts	Rex Ricketts, Lamaj	3:10
3.	"The Opposite Of Love"	Peter Akor, Hakeem Aro Lambo	Hakeem Aro Lambo, GunzZ	3:36
4.	"Living In Boundage"	Donald Ofik	Prettyboy D-O	2:48

== Production ==
Ramsey Films Productions and Sozo Films began developing Tòkunbò in late 2022 and continued over several months. The script was written by Thecla Uzozie and Todimu Adegoke and produced by Joy Odiete and Chris Odeh.

Principal photography for Tòkunbò took place in Lagos, Nigeria, and Sèmè the Republic of Benin. It was directed by Ramsey Nouah who had previously worked on several projects including Living in Bondage: Breaking Free.

== Release ==
In July 2024, it was announced that Netflix had purchased the rights to distribute Ramsey Noua's new movie; The movie was initially set to release in August 2024.

Tòkunbò had its premiere in Lagos, Nigeria, on August 19, 2024, with sponsorship from Amstel Malta. The film was subsequently released on Netflix by Ramsey Films Productions on August 23, 2024.

== Reception ==
Critical response

On the review aggregator website Rotten Tomatoes, 40% of 5 critics' reviews are positive, with an average rating of 2.5/10.

Archi Sengupta of Leisure Byte describes the film as an entertaining and gripping experience that keeps viewers guessing until the very end. By focusing on social issues, it effectively utilizes the "time running out" trope to heighten tension and engagement give the film 3/5 stars. Pramit Chatterjee of DM Talkies rated the film 1 star out of 5 stars and wrote “Tokunbo is a sleep-inducing watch; nothing more, nothing less.”

Daniel Hart of Ready Steady Cut rated the film 1 star out of 5 stars and wrote “With B-movie practices straight out of film college, the Nigerian movie lulls audiences into a sleepy experience.”

Confidence Cletus of Premium Times stated, “While the video color grading managed to establish the tone for action scenes, the acting was flat, and the movie was boring”. She also praised Darasimi Nadi's " performance," and wrote, "Darasimi Nadi has always been an impressive child actor. In her role as Nike, she performed exceptionally, being able to switch moods. However, she could have delivered a more robust performance with more practical direction". Confidence also stated that Chidi Mokeme delivers a stand-out performance as Gaza, the notorious gangster. His performance is commendable. She gave the film an average rating of 4/10.
