= Lilian Afegbai =

Nigerian actress and film producer

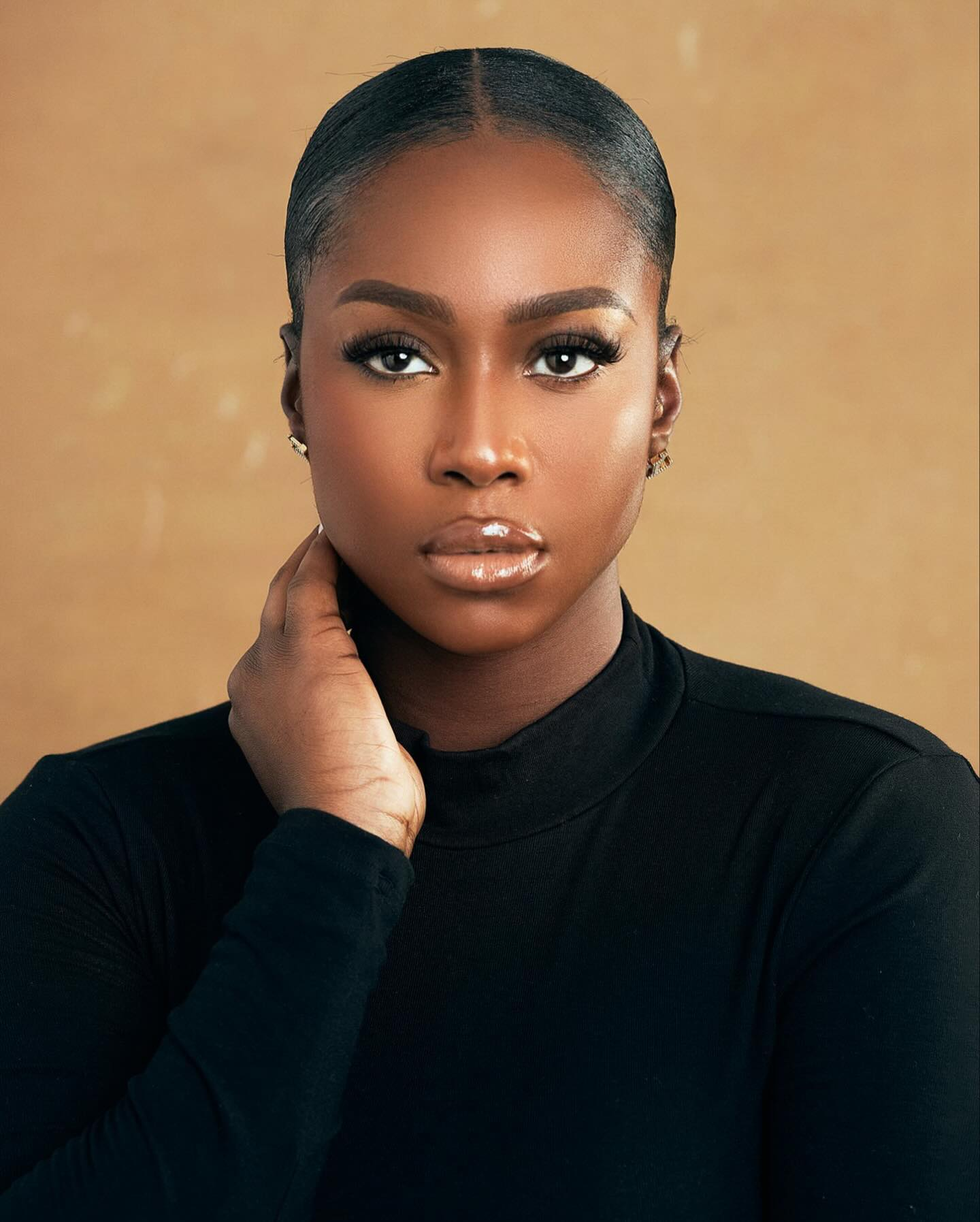
- Born: 11 November 1991 (age 34); Benin City, Edo State, Nigeria
- Occupations: Actress, producer
- Years active: 2013—present

Lilian Afegbai (born 11 November 1991) is a Nigerian actress, film producer, and entrepreneur. In 2018, she won the Africa Magic Viewers' Choice Awards (AMVCA) for the Indigenous movie of the Year for her produced debut film, Bound in 2018. In 2019, she launched her lingerie and gym Wear line "Lilly’s Secret"

== Early life and education ==
Lilian Afegbai was born on November 11, 1991. She spent her early years in Edo state, Nigeria. She completed her primary education at Our Ladies of Apostles and then attended Word of Faith Group of Schools in Benin City, Edo State, for secondary education.

Afterward, Afegbai pursued higher education at Benson Idahosa University in Edo State, Nigeria, where she obtained a Bachelor of Science degree in Accounting.

== Career ==
Lilian Afegbai was a contestant on the reality show Big Brother Africa in 2014 and gained fame as a result. She featured in the 2015 film Road to yesterday and as herself in a short film Pepper soup. She also appeared on Mnet's tv series Do good as Venice the blogger 2015/2016 and co-produced the movie Dark Past. She started entertainment company EEP entertainment and debuted as a producer with the movie Bound, which featured celebrities Rita Dominic, Enyinna Nwigwe, Joyce Kalu and Prince Nwafor.

== Filmography ==
Year	Film	Role
2008	Tinsel	Actor
2012	The Kingdom	Oluchi
2015	Undercover Lover	Amy
2015	Road to Yesterday	Receptionist
2016	Pepper Soup	Actor
2016	The Wedding	Actor
2016	A Little White Lie	Lilian
2016	Happy Ending	Amaka
2016	The Therapist	Rosie
2017	Atlas	Iyhotu
2017	My Wife & I	Yetunde
2017	The Women	Esi
2017	Dance to My Beat	Becky
2017	Dark Past	Actor
2018	Dr Duncan	Actor
2018	Grapes	Actor
2018	Unmasked	Actor
2018	The Spell	Actor
2018	Moms at War	Hot Girl
2018	Merry Men: The Real Yoruba Demons	P.A.
2018	Ajoche	Princess Agbenu
2018	Bound	Producer/Actor
2020	True Vision	Actor
2020	A Tiny Line	Actor
2020	Fate of Alakada	Actor
2020	Assistant Madams	Actor
2021	Trump Card	Miss Amadi
2021	The Reckoner	Actor
2021	Third Avenue (film)	Actor
2022	Double Strings	Producer/Actor
2023	Hotel Labamba	Ella
2024	Momiwa	Jane
2024	Dead Serious	
2025	Reel Love	
2025	To Kill a Monkey	Idia

== Awards ==
Year	Event	Prize	Recipient	Result
2017	City People Entertainment Awards	Most Promising Actress	Self	Won
2018	Africa Magic Viewers Choice Awards	Best Indigenous Movie Of the Year	Bound Movie/Self	Won
2021	African Choice Awards	Actress of the Year	Self	Won
2021	LA Mode Awards	Celebrity Entrepreneur of the Year	Self	Won
2018	LA Mode Awards	Most Fashionable Female Celebrity of the year	Self	Won
