= Moses Inwang =

Nigerian film director (born 1980)

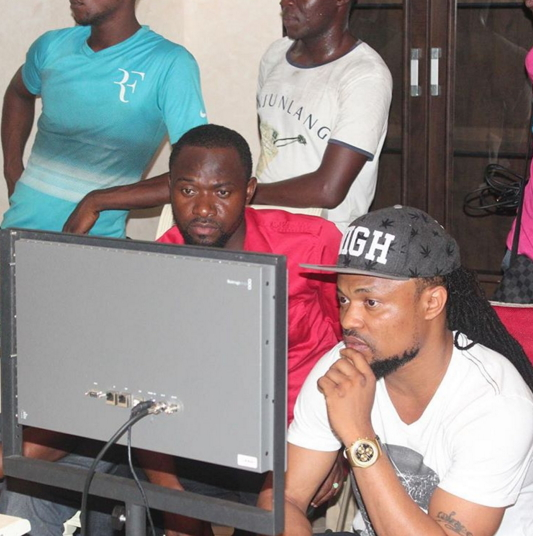
- CEO Sneeze Films
- Born: 31 January 1978 (age 48); Surulere, Lagos, Nigeria
- Citizenship: Nigerian
- Education: Obafemi Awolowo University
- Occupations: Director; screenwriter; editor; film producer
- Years active: 2000-present
- Known for: Merry Men 2; Alter Ego; Stalker; Torn
- Awards: See below
- Website: sneezefilms.com

Moses Inwang (born 31 January 1978) is a Nigerian film director, producer, editor, and screenwriter best known for classic films in the mainstream of Nollywood that speak to societal ills and nagging life issues rarely documented in Nigerian films. In 2012, Inwang gained significant recognition for his work as director and producer of the psychological thriller film Torn

Torn ,⁣ as a Director and Producer,Movie released in cinemas nationwide in 2013. With multiple nominations, award and recognition bagged from that movie, he went on to direct and produce other hits like Damage, Cold Feet, Stalker, Last 3 digits, Alter Ego, Crazy People, American Driver, Unroyal, and lastly Merry Men 2; Ayo Makun (AY)’s blockbuster film, which emerged as the 2nd highest-grossing movie of 2019 in Nigeria with a sum of 240 million.

With a career spanning over two decades, Sneezemankind as he is popularly addressed, got his first film credit in 1998 when he co-produced Two Good Men. By 2004 he started his production company, Sneeze Films, and kicked off with the film Save My Soul. 2008, however, saw him directing the film, Lost Maiden, a film wthatbrought the controversial issue of female circumcision to the fore, headlining social discussion. He further went on to make Save Our Souls, an educative film about cancer. He also directed and co-produced Damage in 2011, addressing the issue of domestic violence, a film that received multiple nominations and carted away awards in Florida, USA.

== Education ==
Inwang attended Obafemi Awolowo University.

== Career ==
Inwang came into the spotlight and quickly gained critical recognition for directing the psychological thriller, Torn, which he produced and released in cinemas nationwide. The film earned him multiple award nominations and recognition locally and globally. However, his career dived in the right direction after being contracted to direct Merry Men 2, a film produced by Ayo Makun (A.Y.) of Corporate World Entertainment, which emerged as the 2nd highest-grossing film of 2019.

== Personal life ==
Inwang is the surviving male child in a family of six after losing his brother at a young age. He is married to actress Emem Inwang.

== Professional life ==
In 2004, he started his production company, Sneeze Films and kicked off with the film Save My Soul. In 2008, he directed the film,Lost Maiden, a film wthatbrought the issue of female circumcision to the fore of social discussion. He also made Save Our Souls, an educative film about cancer. He also directed and co-produced Damage in 2011, a film wthataddressed the issue of domestic violence, receiving multiple awards and award nominations.

The psychological thriller Torn which he produced in 2012 and which was released in cinemas nationwide in 2013, earned him and most of the actors who starred in it a lot of award nominations and recognition. In 2012, his film Damage earned Inwang the nomination for best director at the African Oscars held in Florida USA,⁣ while the film won the award for Best Film at the African Oscars Awards. In 2013, he won the City People Award for Best Director. His 2013 film Torn received 9 nominations at the GIAMA awards in Houston, Texas and 6 nominations at the Best Of Nollywood Awards. In 2014 he went on record as the first Director in Nollywood to receive two nomination as best director at the Nollywood Movies Awards.

His movie, The Last 3 Digits, was nominated for best comedy at the African Movie Academy Awards AMAA in 2015 and was also chosen amongst the few selected Nollywood films that were screened to thousands of people at the Nollywood Week Paris. His movie Stalker, a romantic drama which premiered in Nigeria on 26 February 2016, received 10 nominations and won 3 awards at the 2015 Golden Icons Academy Movie Awards in the United States.

In 2015 STALKER, another film written, produced and directed by Moses Inwang, raked in 12 nominations at the GIAMA awards Hin ouston and won awards for Bthe est Actor, Best actress and Best Film categories. Still in 2015 Stalker won the award for Best International Film at the New York film Festival. In 2017 his film American Driver from his production company Sneeze Films received the best comedy Award at The Peoples Film Festival, Harlem New York. American Driver was also nominated for "Comedy of the Year" at the 2017 Best of Nollywood Awards.

In 2017, another blockbuster, Alter Ego, which was produced and directed by Moses Inwang and starred Omotola Jalade, was released to a highly anticipating audience in the Nigerian cinemas and immediately became the most talked about film of the year. Alter Ego clinched the award for The Most Outstanding Film at the Africa International Film Festival AFRIFF. It also won Moses Inwang the Best Director award at the Toronto International Nollywood Film Festival and Best Screenplay award at the Africa Magic Viewers Choice Awards AMVCA with the film getting nine nominations. It was given the best international film award at The Peoples Film Festival NY.

In 2018, Moses Inwang produced the film Crazy People which became one of the top ten highest-grossing films of the year.[3] He later released the romantic drama Cold Feet.

By late 2019, Moses was contracted by A.Y's Corporate World Entertainment to direct the blockbuster and multiple award-winning film, Merry Men, and the sequel, Merry Men, 2, went on to emerge tas he 2nd highest-grossing film at the box office by the end of 2019 with a sum of 240 million.

== Awards and nominations ==
Year	Event	Category	Film	Result	Ref
2012	African Oscars Awards, Florida, USA	Best Film	Damage	Won	
2012	African Oscars Awards	Best Director	Damage	Nominated	
2013	City People Entertainment Awards	Best Director	Torn	Won	
2013	2013 Golden Icons Academy Movie Awards	Best Motion	Torn	Nominated	
2013	2013 Golden Icons Academy Movie Awards	Best Drama	Torn	Nominated	
2013	2013 Golden Icons Academy Movie Awards	Best Supporting Actress	Torn	Nominated	
2013	2013 Golden Icons Academy Movie Awards	Best Supporting Actor	Torn	Nominated	
2013	2013 Golden Icons Academy Movie Awards	Picture Best Director	Torn	Nominated	
2013	2013 Golden Icons Academy Movie Awards	Producer of the Year	Torn	Nominated	
2014	Golden Icons Academy Movie Awards (GIAMA)	Best Screenplay	Last 3 Digits	Won	
2015	Golden Icons Academy Movie Awards (GIAMA)	Best Film (Drama)	Stalker	Won	
2016	Zulu African Film Academy Awards	Best Director		Won	
2017	Best of Nollywood Awards	Comedy of the Year	American Driver	Nominated	
2017	The People's Choice Awards	Best Comedy	American Driver	Won	
2018	Africa Magic Viewers' Choice Awards (AMVCA)	Best Writer (Movie/TV Series)	Alter Ego	Won	
2018	Best of Nollywood Awards	Director of the Year	Body Language	Nominated	
2020	2020 Hollywood African Prestigious Awards	Best Director in an Independent Film (Africa)	Unroyal	Won	
2020	The People’s Film Festival	Best International	Cold Feet	Won	
2020	The People’s Film Festival	Best Director	Cold Feet	Won	
2022	NollywoodWeek Film Festival	Public Choice Awards	Lockdown	Won	

== Filmography ==
Feature Films

Year	Title	Notes	Starring	Role	Type
1998	Two Good Men	Co-produced by Moses Inwang	Tony Umez, Ernest Obi, Stephnora Okere	Co-Producer	Feature Film
2004	Save My Soul	Directed by Moses Inwang	Ndidi Obi, Zach Orji	Producer	Feature Film
2008	Lost Maiden	Directed by Moses Inwang	Omotola Jalade, Bimbo Akintola, Kalu Ikeagwu	Produced by Chisom Oz-Lee	Feature Film
2016	Stalker	Directed by Moses Inwang	Nse Ikpe-Etim, Jim Iyke, Caroline Danjuma	Director and writer	Feature Film
2017	American Driver	Directed by Moses Inwang	Evan King, Jim Iyke, Anita Chris	Produced by Bode Ojo and Moses Inwang	Feature Film
2017	Alter Ego	Directed by Moses Inwang	Omotola Jalade, Wale Ojo, Jide Kosoko; Emem Inwang, Kunle Remi	Produced by Esther Eyibio	Feature Film
2017	Body Language	Directed by Moses Inwang			
2018	Crazy People	Directed by Moses Inwang	Ramsey Nouah, Chigul, Desmond Elliot, Kunle Afolayan	Producer	Feature Film
2019	Cold Feet	Directed by Moses Inwang	Jim Iyke, Joselyn Dumas, Enyinna Nwigwe, Beverly Naya, Femi Adebayo	Producer	Feature Film
2019	Merry Men 2	Directed by Moses Inwang	Jim Iyke, Ayo Makun, Ramsey Nouah	Produced by Ayo Makun	Feature Film
2020	Unroyal	Directed by Moses Inwang	Pete Edochie, Shaffy Bello, Matilda Lambert, Blossom Chukwujekwu, Ik Ogbonna, Femi Adebayo Salami, Ime Bishop Umoh, Abayomi Alvin, Linda Osifo, Emem Inwang	Produced by Matilda Lambert Productions	Feature Film
2021	Lockdown	Directed by Moses Inwang	Omotola Jalade-Ekeinde, Sola Sobowale, Chioma Akpotha, Deyemi Okanlawon, Nobert Young, Charles Awurum, Ini Dima-Okojie, Jide Kene Achufusi	Produced by Rukeme David Eruotor, Michael Djaba	Feature Film
2021	Bad Comments	Directed by Moses Inwang	Jim Iyke, Osas Ighodaro, Sharon Ooja, Ini Edo, Ayo Makun, Yemi Blaq, Chikwetalu Agu, Patience Ozokwor, Edward Chukwuma-Jiah, Ben Lugo Touitou,	Produced by Darlington Abuda	Feature Film
2023	Merry Men 3: Nemesis	Directed by Moses Inwang	Fred Amata, Segun Arinze, Olurotimi Adeyemo, Katerina Ataman	Produced by Darlington Abuda	Featured Film
2023	Blood Vessel			Director	
2024	Dead Serious		Sharon Ooja	Director	

== See also ==
- List of Nigerian film producers
