= Nichole Banna =

Nollywood actress and producer

- Born: Imo State, Nigeria
- Other name: Virgin Mary
- Education: River State University of Science and Technology
- Occupations: Film actress, producer

Nichole Banna popularly known as Virgin Mary is a Nollywood actress and producer who has featured in various film. She produced the movie, Icheke Oku which is of Igbo origin.

== Early life and education ==
According to an interview with punch newspaper and sunnews, the Nollywood actress of Imo state origin went to Oliver heights international School in Port Harcourt for her primary education and Emmy Norberton International school for secondary education. She bagged a B.Sc. degree in computer science at River State University of science and Technology.

== Career ==
She has acted in different films and produced a movie so far titled Icheke Oku.

== Filmography ==
- Chidera (2012) as Wedding Guest
- The Banker (2015) as Joke
- Pot of Gold (2015) as Kate
- Dangerous Assassin (2015) as Helen
- Icheke Oku (2016) as Utonwa
- Moon Maids (2016) as Omaluga
- Bound (2018)
- Deepest cut
- Just a Night (2018) as Eugena
- Loving Femi (2023) as Tari
- Adze the African Vampire (2024) as Sasha

== Award and nomination ==
She was nominated for the Best actress in the leading Role at the BON award, 2016.

== See also ==
- Jumoke Odetola
- Bound (2018 film)
- Matilda Lambert
