= Body Language (2017 film) =

2017 Nigerian film

- Directed by: Moses Inwang; Lawrence Richards
- Written by: Anthony Kehinde Joseph; Lawrence Richards
- Produced by: Emem Isong
- Starring: Tana Adelana; Ramsey Nouah; Ken Erics
- Cinematography: Tom Robson
- Edited by: Nsisong Essien
- Release date: 2017
- Country: Nigeria
- Language: English

Body Language is a 2017 Nigerian thriller film. It was produced by Emem Isong, the owner of Rok Studios. Tom Robson is the cinematographer and the screenplay is by Kehinde Joseph.

== Synopsis ==
Tola works as a stripper as well as a marketer because she is interested in getting attention from men. One man, Nick, pays her to privately dance for him. Tola's life is in danger as a group of hired killers, "The Lagos reapers", is pursuing her. Nick's interest in Tola is not a coincidence as Nick is trying to investigate the killers, who murdered his daughter.

== Cast ==
The film starred:

- Ramsey Nouah as Nick Yahaya
- Tana Adelana as Tola / Amber
- Lawretta Richards
- Emem Ufot
- Patrick Nnamani
- Darlington Amadi as Dance Teacher
- Ken Erics as Lancelot

== Reception ==
According to Talk African Movies, Body Language had a good plot and was mostly captivating but was hindered by kinks that reduced its impact.

According to Jerry Chiemeke, despite some plot holes that were impossible to ignore, the film was "one of the better movies to have made it to cinemas this year."

The movie has been criticized for its lack of suspense.

== See also ==
- List of Nigerian films of 2017
