= Unroyal =

2020 Nigerian drama film

- Directed by: Moses Inwang
- Produced by: Matilda Lambert
- Starring: Matilda Lambert; IK Ogbonna; Prince Sontoye; Blossom Chukwujekwu; Linda Osifo
- Release date: 20 March 2020; (Nigeria)
- Running time: 96 minutes
- Country: Nigeria
- Language: English

Unroyal, is a 2020 Nigerian drama film directed by Moses Inwang and produced by Matilda Lambert. The film stars Matilda Lambert and IK Ogbonna in the lead roles whereas Prince Sontoye, Blossom Chukwujekwu and Linda Osifo made supportive roles. It is the story of Princess Boma, daughter of Okrika Kings, where she treats everyone as though they weren’t humans.

The film made its premier on 20 March 2020 and later released through Netflix on 15 August 2021. The film received mixed reviews from critics.

== Cast ==
- Matilda Lambert as Princess Boma
- Pete Edochie as King of Okrika
- Shaffy Bello as Queen of Okrika
- IK Ogbonna as Prince Leonard
- Prince Sontoye
- Blossom Chukwujekwu as Dr. Tobi
- Linda Osifo as Nemi
- Emem Inwang as Matilda
- Ime Bishop Umoh as Kala
- Chinenye Nnebe as Awajinma
- Femi Adebayo as Royal Suitor
- Kingsley Abasili as Elder in Council
- Weme Charity Ada as Maid
- Stephen Farotimi as Bodyguard

== Awards and nominations ==
Year	Award	Category	Recipient	Result	Ref
2020	Best of Nollywood Awards	Movie with the Best Sound	Unroyal	Won	
2020	Best of Nollywood Awards	Best Use of Nigerian Costume in a Movie	Unroyal	Won	
2020	Best of Nollywood Awards	Best Supporting Actor –English	Blossom Chukwujekwu/Abayomi Alvin	Nominated	
2020	Best of Nollywood Awards	Movie with the Best Special Effect	Unroyal	Nominated	
2020	Best of Nollywood Awards	Movie with the Best Cinematography	Unroyal	Nominated	
2020	Best of Nollywood Awards	Best Kiss in a Movie	IK Ogbonna/Matilda Lambert	Nominated	
2020	Best of Nollywood Awards	Movie with the Best Production Design	Unroyal	Nominated	
