= Tana Adelana =

Nigerian actress (born 1984)

- Born: Christiana Nkemdilim Egbo; 24 December 1984 (age 41); Surulere, Lagos State, Nigeria
- Education: University of Lagos
- Occupations: Actress; producer; model; TV presenter; entrepreneur
- Spouse: Femi Adelana (m. 2007)
- Children: 2
- Awards: 2017: City People Movie Awards for Best Supporting Actress, 2011 The Future Awards Africa, Best of Nollywood Actress 2018
- Website: www.tanaadelanaofficial.com

Christiana Nkemdilim Adelana (born 24 December 1984), popularly known as Tana Adelana, is a Nigerian actress. She won the Best Supporting Actress Category of CITY People's Movie Awards 2017 and was the 2011 winner of the On Air personality of the year (TV) at the future Awards and the 2005 Grind Awards winner. She is of Igbo descent, her family name is Egbo.

== Early life ==
Adelana was born into a traditional Catholic royal family in the 1980s. She is the last born in a family of ten. She attended Treasure Land Nursery and Primary School in Surulere for her primary education, and St. Francis Catholic Secondary School in Idimu, Lagos. She is an Igbo girl from Nara Unateze in Nkanu East LGA of Enugu State. Her father died in 2022.

== Education ==
Tana graduated from the University of Lagos Nigeria where she obtained a B.Sc. in Urban and Regional Planning. Thereafter, she attained a diploma certificate in makeup and style from the makeup art school London (South African campus). She later attended the Metropolitan School of Business and Management United Kingdom and earned a special executive master's certificate in Leadership and Management from the Metropolitan.

== Career ==
Tana came into the spotlight as an OAP after auditioning for MTN Y’Hello TV Show in 2002. She is also the first Nigerian on Channel O as a TV Presenter made her introduction by acting in TV series, Disclosure. She started her firm production, Tana Adelana Productions in July 2013. One of her movies titled Quick Sand, which features Ufuoma Ejenobor, Chelsea Eze, Wale Macaulay, Anthony Monjaro, Femi Jacobs, and other performing artists.

== Personal life ==
Tana Adelana is married to Femi Adelana, her long-term boyfriend. The couple had been dating for 14 years and were married in 2007. The union has produced two children. She is known for keeping her family out of the spotlight.

== Awards and nominations ==
Year	Award ceremony	Prize	Result	Ref
2011	The Future Awards Africa	On Air personality of the year (TV)	Won	
2017	City People Movie Awards	Best Supporting Actress	Won	
2018	Best of Nollywood Awards	Best Actress in a Lead Role - English	Won	
2019	Best of Nollywood Awards	Best Supporting Actress – English	Nominated	

== Filmography ==
- Sarah (2023) as Gloria
- Inches Apart (2023) as Samantha
- One Too Many Heart Breaks (2023) as Lian
- Ijogbon (2023) as Mama Oby
- Equal Right (2023) as Chioma
- Blue Jay (2022) as Irene
- Emotional Ripple (2022) as Vicky
- Drops of Mercy (2022) as Fubara
- Couple Goals (2021) as Emily
- Under the Carpet (2021)
- Ejiro's Lust (2021) as ASP George
- Women (2020) as Serena
- Marriage Trap (2020) as Tope
- Social Media 101 (2019) as Emelda
- The Bling Lagosians (2019) as Kaima
- Dirty Dirtier (2018) as Osaro
- Flame (2018) as Tosin
- Mr. and Mrs. Revolution (2017)
- Body Language (2017)
- Baby daddy (2017)
- Tamed (2016) as Stephanie
- Glass Slippers (2016) as Lola
- Doll House (2015) as Lady D
- Lost Pride (2015) as Lucia
- Game of Pythons (2014) as Rhema
- Tales of Eve: Caged (2014) as Olaitan
- How to Love (2013) as Remi
- Dreamwalker (2013) as Mavis Ekem
- Single and Married (2012) as Vida
- The Kingdom (2012) as Princess Gina
- Two Brides and a Baby (2011) as Ify
