= Crazy People (2018 film) =

- Directed by: Moses Inwang
- Produced by: Moses Inwang
- Starring: Sola Sobowale, Ireti Doyle, Monalisa Chinda, Desmond Elliot, Kunle Afolayan, Bryan Okwara, and Benjamin Toutoui
- Release date: 2018
- Country: Nigeria
- Language: English language

Crazy People is a 2018 Nigerian comedy film produced and directed by Moses Inwang. It focuses on mental health issues and impersonation in society. The film stars Sola Sobowale, Ireti Doyle, Monalisa Chinda, Desmond Elliot, Kunle Afolayan, Bryan Okwara, and Benjamin Toutoui.

== Synopsis ==
A popular Nollywood star returns to the industry on a mission to find his impostor.

== Cast ==
- Ramsey Nouah as Ramsey
- Chioma Omeruha as Lucy
- Emem Inwang as Clara
- Francis Onwochei as Mr. Opara
- Sola Sobowale as Mrs. Akinwunmi
- Ireti Doyle as Regina
- Monalisa Chinda
- Desmond Elliot
- Kunle Afolayan
- Bryan Okwara as Alfred's friend
- Benjamin Toutoui as Alfred
- Patrick Onyeke as Aro
- Funny bone as guest appearance.

== Premiere ==
The film was screened nationwide on 25 May 2018.
