= Bound (2018 film) =

2018 Nigerian romantic drama film

- Directed by: Frank Rajah Arase
- Written by: Neye Balogun
- Produced by: Lilian Afegbai
- Starring: Rita Dominic; Enyinna Nwigwe; Joyce Kalu; Nicole Banner; Duke Emmanuel; Neye Balogun
- Cinematography: Austin Nwaolie
- Edited by: Angel Alake
- Production company: EEP Enterteriment
- Distributed by: EEP Enterteriment
- Release date: 16 March 2018; (Nigeria)
- Running time: 125 minutes
- Country: Nigeria
- Language: English

Bound, is a 2018 Nigerian romantic drama film directed by Frank Rajah Arase and produced by Lilian Afegbai. The film stars Rita Dominic and Enyinna Nwigwe in the lead roles whereas Joyce Kalu, Nicole Banner, Duke Emmanuel, and Neye Balogun made supportive roles. The film revolves around Chinenye, a 35 beautiful career woman unable to get married but she met Elochukwu and made unconditional love towards her.

The film has been shot in Enugu, Nigeria. The film made its premier on 16 March 2018 at the Filmhouse IMAX Cinema Lekki, Lagos. The film received mixed reviews from critics and screened worldwide. The film won the Best Indigenous Language (Igbo) award at the 2018 Africa Magic Viewers Choice Awards.

== Cast ==
- Rita Dominic as Chineye
- Enyinna Nwigwe as Elochukwu
- Joyce Kalu
- Nichole Banna
- Duke Emmanuel
- Neye Balogun
- Stan K. Amandi
- Prince Nwafor
