= Lockdown (2021 Nigerian film) =

2021 Nigerian psychological thriller film

- Directed by: Moses Inwang
- Written by: Moses Inwang
- Screenplay by: Musa Jeffery David
- Produced by: Rukeme David Eruotor; Michael Djaba
- Starring: Omotola Jalade-Ekeinde; Tony Umez; Charles Awurum; Emem Inwang; Josh2Funny; Melanie Oghene; Chinonso Arubayi; Omini Aho; Ada Ameh; Jerry Amilo
- Production companies: Sneeze Films; FilmOne iFactory Films; CEM Media Group
- Distributed by: FilmOne Entertainment
- Release date: 28 May 2021
- Country: Nigeria
- Language: English

Lockdown is a 2021 Nigerian psychological thriller film written by Musa Jeffery David, Moses Inwang, and Melanie Oghene and directed by Moses Inwang. The film stars Omotola Jalade-Ekeinde, Tony Umez and Charles Awurum in the lead roles. The film was produced by the collaboration among studios Sneeze Films, FilmOne, iFactory Films and CEM Media Group. The film is based on Nigerian medical doctor Ameyo Adadevoh who was credited with having curbed a wider spread of the Ebola virus in Nigeria by placing the patient zero, Patrick Sawyer, in quarantine despite pressure from the Liberian government. The film had its theatrical release on 28 May 2021 and received mixed reviews from critics.

== Cast ==
- Omotola Jalade-Ekeinde as Dr. Njoku
- Tony Umez as Martins
- Charles Awurum as Papa Sunny
- Sola Sobowale as Mrs. Adeogun
- Ini Dima-Okojie as Angela
- Chioma Akpotha as Chidinma
- Jide Kene Achufusi as Sam
- Deyemi Okanlawon as Tony
- Nobert Young as Dr. Fred
- Emem Inwang as Funke
- Josh2Funny as Sunny
- Melanie Oghene as Nurse Samantha
- Chinonso Arubayi as Nurse Bisi
- Omini Aho as Boniface
- Ada Ameh as Mrs. Adebola
- Jerry Amilo as Kabiru Musa
- Chioma Chukwuka Akpotha as Chidinma
- Yomi Black as Dr Joe
- Fares Boulos as Omar Samir
- Noble Emmanuel as Femi
- Christiana Martin as Jade
- Nasboi as Jasper
- Deyemi Okanlawon as Tony
- Peter Okoye as Self
- Bamike Olawunmi as Bambam
- Ben Lugo Touitou as Kunle
- Jasmine Roy Ukoh as Ifeoma Okeke

== Production ==
The principal photography of the film was postponed due to the nationwide lockdown implemented in Nigeria during the first wave of the COVID-19 pandemic in March 2020. The film became the second batch of the Western African Film Fund with the collaboration of Sneeze Films, FilmOne, iFactory Films, and CEM Media Group along with HuaHua Media and Empire Entertainment. The film was made based on the Ebola outbreak despite speculations that merged that the film was inspired by the COVID-19 outbreak. Director Inwang, who was the brainchild of the story for the film, revealed that he had begun conceiving the story in 2016 based on the Ebola virus outbreak in 2015. The film was predominantly shot in Lagos.
