= Yoruba demon =

Nigerian slang

Yoruba demon is a slang for a young man, typically of Yoruba descent who is often a smooth talker or a playboy. The words "Yoruba Demon" started as a joke on social media circa 2015 as a way to describe a stereotypical ability of unfaithful Yoruba men to charm their way into a woman's heart but has also been used as an ethnic slur or insult and has been typically used in internet memes. Characteristics of Yoruba demons include a particular choice of dress, typically traditional outfits from Southwestern Nigeria e.g. the agbada and fila, having a properly groomed beard, multiple romantic and sexual partners, party-going, being sociable and articulate.

== History ==
Some time around 2015, the term gradually gained popularity on the internet with various social media users coming forth with "stories of heartbreak" to back up the theory of Yoruba men being "demons". Around 2016, articles were being written about the topic with the first Urban Dictionary entry being made and it began to spread to other offline mediums and became a topic of discussion on TV shows. By 2018, the movie "Merry Men: The Real Yoruba Demons" helped increase the popularity of the phrase even further.

Popular Nigeria writer and polemicist, David Hundeyin has argued that the Yoruba Demon phenomenon is rooted in 1970s oil boom and the role of Lagos as economic and cultural capital (home not only of the music industry but also the news media), which facilitated the projection of the archetype of a high-living, carefree partying Lagos and interchangeably Yoruba man in Does the Yoruba Demon Really Exist ??

== Usage ==
The term has been somewhat controversial due to its varied use. It is mostly used in jocular form but has also been used as a slur and insult. Some Yoruba men have embraced the term in jest and some see it as a flattering descriptor due to the glamorous attributes associated with it.

== In popular culture ==
- The movie "Merry Men: The Real Yoruba Demons" portrays some of the attitudes of the so-called Yoruba demons.
- In the song "Sade" by Rotimi, the Nigerian musician Mayorkun calls himself a repented Yoruba demon.
