= Alter Ego (2017 film) =

2017 Nigerian film

Alter Ego (2017)
- Directed by: Moses Inwang
- Written by: Jude Martins
- Produced by: Esther Eyibio
- Release date: 21 July 2017
- Country: Nigeria
- Language: English

Alter Ego is a 2017 Nigerian drama film written by Jude Martins, directed by Moses Inwang and screenwriting by Esther Eyibio and produced by Sidomex Universal. It stars Omotola Jalade, Wale Ojo, Jide Kosoko and Kunle Remi.

== Plot ==
Alter Ego tells a story of a successful lawyer who has dedicated a great part of her professional life to prosecuting sex offenders. She adopts any measure possible to see that sex offenders, especially those who molest children, are jailed. Ada Igwe (Omotola Jalade) does not only rely on the law to exert punitive measures on offenders as she also uses unorthodox methods to make sure those she finds guilty of child molestation and sex offences pay for their crimes. Her quest for justice is influenced by her personal childhood experience as she was raped by her teacher in school. However, her drive to punish sex offenders is impeded by her high libido. She engages her domestic as well as official workers in sex to quench her urge whenever she feels it, irrespective of the time and place.

== Cast ==
- Omotola Jalade Ekeinde as Adaora Igwe
- Wale Ojo as Timothy
- Esther Eyibio as Zika
- Kunle Remi as Daniel
- Emem Inwang as Aisha
- Jide Kosoko as Landlord
- Tina Mba as Dr. Tochi
- Ayenuro Ademola as Doctor
- Rahila Ahmed as Brenda
- Abiola Atanda as Alhaja
- Mumeen Badmus as Uwan
- Charles Billion as Chike
- Friday Bassey as Court Clerk
- Maryann Emeluke as Pastor

== Reception ==
The film was released to a mixed reception. Vanguard News commented: "Omotola has proved once again that she is still in the game with a strong and convincing performance as Adaora Igwe. She inhabits the characters of both barrister and sex addict, switching seamlessly between both. You are literarily sucked into her world and even with her flaws, you find yourself still rooting for her success. Despite the weight gain, she still exudes her trademark sexiness for which her fans have come to love her for."

Review Naija wrote: "My major drawback with this movie is that the characters were not fully developed. The beginning felt rushed, so we got to see a lot of Ada but not much of any other character. Even at that, I think Ada’s character could have been developed further. When the movie ended, I was intrigued (as I’m sure you will be when you watch the movie) but not vested enough in any of the characters to care how they ended up."

Complete list of awards
Year	Award	Category	Recipient(s)	Result	Ref.
2017	Best of Nollywood Awards	Best Actress in a Lead role –English	Omotola Jalade-Ekiende	Nominated	
2017	Best of Nollywood Awards	Best Movie with Social message	Alter Ego	Nominated	
2017	Best of Nollywood Awards	Movie with the Best Production Design	Alter Ego	Nominated	
2017	Best of Nollywood Awards	Best Kiss in a Movie	Omotola Jalade Ekeinde /Kunle Remmy	Nominated	
2017	Nollywood Travel Film Festival Awards	Best Actress in a Lead role	Alter Ego	Won	
