= Under the Carpet =

2021 Nigerian romantic drama film by Tope Alake

- Directed by: Tope Alake
- Starring: Iyabo Ojo; Deyemi Okanlawon; Tana Adelana
- Release date: 12 March 2021
- Running time: 139 minutes
- Country: Nigeria
- Language: English

Under the Carpet is a 2021 Nigerian romantic drama film written and directed by Tope Alake. The film stars Iyabo Ojo, Deyemi Okanlawon and Tana Adelana in the lead roles. The film was premiered on 7 March 2021 at the IMAX Cinema and had its theatrical release on 12 March 2021.

== Cast ==
- Iyabo Ojo as Tiana
- Deyemi Okanlawon
- Tana Adelana
- Femi Jacobs as Ayodeji Lawson
- Lydia Lawrence Nze
- Tosin Abiola
- Roxy Antak
- Moyinoluwa Olutayo
- Alabi Pasuma
