= Third Avenue (series) =

2021 Nigerian comedy film

Third Avenue is a Nigerian comedy series featuring three housemates who have different challenges and problems. It is produced by Bami Gregs & Esse Akwawa and it is directed by Tope Alake. Third Avenue is a series with 12 episodes released on 1 February 2021.

== Cast ==
- David Jones David as Tboy
- Jidekene Achufusi as Leo
- Lilian Afegbai as Kimberly
- Bami Gregs as Mia
- Tope Olowoniyan as Pamela

== Plot ==
Tboy is not sure of the relationship he is in with two of his girlfriends, Leo is barely coping as a gigolo, and the only female housemate, Kimberly despite being a caring lady finds it hard to get true love. Despite all their challenges, the three co-exist peacefully.
