= Josh2Funny =

Nigerian comedian and actor

- Chibuike
- Born: Chibuike Josh Alfred; 18 December 1990 (age 35); Anambra State, Nigeria
- Education: Computer Science at Yaba College of Science and Technology

Comedy career
- Years active: 2011–present
- Medium: Stand-up; film; television; music
- Genres: Observational comedy; Insult comedy; satire
- Subjects: Nigerian culture; everyday life; human sexuality; popular culture; current events; trick comedy; marriage

Chibuike Josh Alfred, professionally known as Josh2Funny, is a Nigerian comedian, actor, director and musician.

== Early life ==
Josh2Funny was born in Anambra State on 18 December 1990. He moved to Lagos with his parents when he was eight years old. He shot into the limelight when his skit #DontLeaveMe went viral. He went viral again from playing trick of #fastest reader in the world at America's Got Talent.

== Personal life ==
Josh is married and had a child in 2022.

== Career ==
In October 2022, Josh released a viral sketch in which he plays a speed reader named Ebenezer. He read 1,679 page books within two seconds.

== Filmography ==
- Lagos Real Fake Life (2018) as Johnbull
- Knock Out (2019)
- Lockdown (2021) as Sunny
- Money Miss Road (2022) as Joe

== Awards and recognitions ==
- Won the GAGE Star Award in 2021
- Nominated for the Best Actor in a Supporting Role in the 2022 AMAA awards.
