= Coming from Insanity =

2019 Nigerian crime drama film

- Film poster
- Directed by: Akinyemi Sebastian Akinropo
- Written by: Akinyemi Sebastian Akinropo
- Produced by: Ibidolapo Ajayi
- Starring: Gabriel Afolayan: Damilola Adegbite; Dakore Akande; Wale Ojo; Bolanle Ninalowo; Odunlade Adekola
- Cinematography: Daniel Ehimen
- Edited by: Akinyemi Sebastian Akinropo
- Music by: Tom Hambleton
- Production company: The Movement Pro
- Distributed by: FilmOne Distribution, Netflix
- Release date: 14 June 2019
- Running time: 100 minutes
- Country: Nigeria
- Language: English

Coming from Insanity is a 2019 Nigerian crime drama film directed and written by Akinyemi Sebastian Akinropo. It stars Gabriel Afolayan, Damilola Adegbite, Dakore Akande, Wale Ojo and Bolanle Ninalowo.

The film was released on 14 June 2019 and premiered on Netflix on September 18, 2020.

== Plot ==
Coming from Insanity tells the story of 12-year-old boy Kossi (Gabriel Afolayan) with virtuoso level insight, who was trafficked into Lagos from Togo. He winds up with the Martins (Wale Ojo and Dakore Akande), as a houseboy and grows to become a member of their family. He later teams up with some other friends to make his own money that put him on the radar of the EFCC.

== Cast ==
- Gabriel Afolayan as Kossi
- Damilola Adegbite as Oyin Martins
- Dakore Akande as Mrs. Martins
- Wale Ojo as Mr. Martins
- Bolanle Ninalowo as Rocky
- Odunlade Adekola as cab driver
- Sharon Ooja as Sonia
- Sani Musa Danja as Abubakar
- Adeolu Adefarasin as Emmanuel
- Udoka Oyeka as Toye
- Sambasa Nzeribe as Detective Hammed
- Tina Mba as Captain
- Temidayo Akinboro as Muhtar
- Ijeoma Aniebo as Ify
- DJ Izybeats as Kachi
- Ruth Nkweti as Nabila

== Awards ==
It was nominated for the best first feature narrative in the 2020 Pan African Film Festival and winner of the Audience choice award best feature film at the Pressplay Film festival 2019.

== See also ==
- List of Nigerian films of 2019
