= Merry Men 2 =

2019 Nigerian film

Merry Men 2: Another Mission
- Theatrical release poster
- Directed by: Moses Inwang
- Screenplay by: Anthony Kehinde Joseph
- Story by: Ayo Makun
- Produced by: Darlington Abuda
- Starring: Ramsey Nouah; Ayo Makun; Jim Iyke; Falz; Ireti Doyle; Damilola Adegbite; Ufuoma McDermott; Rosaline Meurer; Nancy Isime; Linda Osifo; Alex Asogwa
- Cinematography: Adekunle Adejuyigbe
- Edited by: Patrick Ovoke Odjegba; Gem Etinosa Owas
- Music by: Michael "Truth" Ogunlade
- Production companies: Corporate World Entertainment; FilmOne Entertainment; Gush Media
- Distributed by: FilmOne Distributions
- Release date: 20 December 2019
- Running time: 114 minutes
- Country: Nigeria
- Languages: English; Yoruba; Pidgin

Merry Men 2: Another Mission is a 2019 Nigerian crime action comedy film and a sequel to Merry Men: The Real Yoruba Demons. It stars Ramsey Nouah, Ayo Makun, Jim Iyke, Falz, Ireti Doyle, Damilola Adegbite, Ufuoma McDermott, Rosaline Meurer, Nancy Isime, Alex Asogwa and Linda Osifo.

== Synopsis ==
Merry Men II continues the adventures of Ayo, Naz, Amaju, and Remi as they embark on another high-stakes mission. Determined to save Kemi, the Merry Men face new challenges. Life has changed for this foursome, and their latest mission pushes them to their limits.

== Cast ==
- Ramsey Nouah as Ayo Alesinloye
- Ayo Makun as Amaju Abioritsegbemi
- Jim Iyke as Naz Okigbo
- Folarin "Falz" Falana as Remi Martins
- Ufuoma McDermott as Zara Aminu
- Damilola Adegbite as Dera Chukwu
- Ireti Doyle as Dame Bethany Maduka
- Rosaline Meurer as Kemi Alesinloye
- Nancy Isime as Sophie Obaseki
- Williams Uchemba as Johnny
- Linda Osifo as Hassana
- Alex Asogwa as Calypso
- Regina Daniels as Kenya Obi
- Ejike Asiegbu as Francis Uduak
- Olamide as himself

== Reception ==
According to a review by Nollywood Post, "Merry Men 2 is gifted with a more fluid storyline and better-connected scenes, thanks to its new writer. We knew what was going on. The Real Yoruba Demons made us look around in desperation several times, but Another Mission had us nodding and smiling."

=== Critical response ===
Writing for The Guardian, Phil Hoad gave it 2 stars and called it "low-budget Fast & Furious-style shenanigans… here are encouraging signs here that Nollywood is upping its action game, at least as far as realizing how quick editing can cover a multitude of staging sins. This is lucky because Inwang has no idea how to mount a dialogue scene, a series of lugubrious exposition-fests gradually tranquilizing the film."
