= Joy Odiete =

Nigerian film director

- Occupations: Film director; Film producer; Film distributor
- Years active: 2005—present
- Organization: Blue Pictures Entertainment
- Known for: Money Miss Road

Joy Odiete is a Nigerian film director and film distributor. She is known for her directing roles in Gone and Money Miss Road. She is the CEO of Blue Pictures entertainment and an affiliate director of Warner Brothers Pictures, Walt Disney Pictures and Black Sheep Entertainment.

== Career ==
Joy Odiete joined the movie industry in 2005. She worked with Silverbird Cinemas and Nu Metro Cinema before venturing into movie production and eventually established a cinema.

== Blue Pictures Entertainment ==
She is the managing director of the Blue Pictures Entertainment, a Nigerian-based film distribution company established in 2006. The distribution company is in control of 54 cinemas and 215 screens.

== Filmography ==
- Money Miss Road (2022)
- Gone
- A Bitter Pill (2021)
