= Ramsey Nouah =

Nigerian actor and director (born 1970)

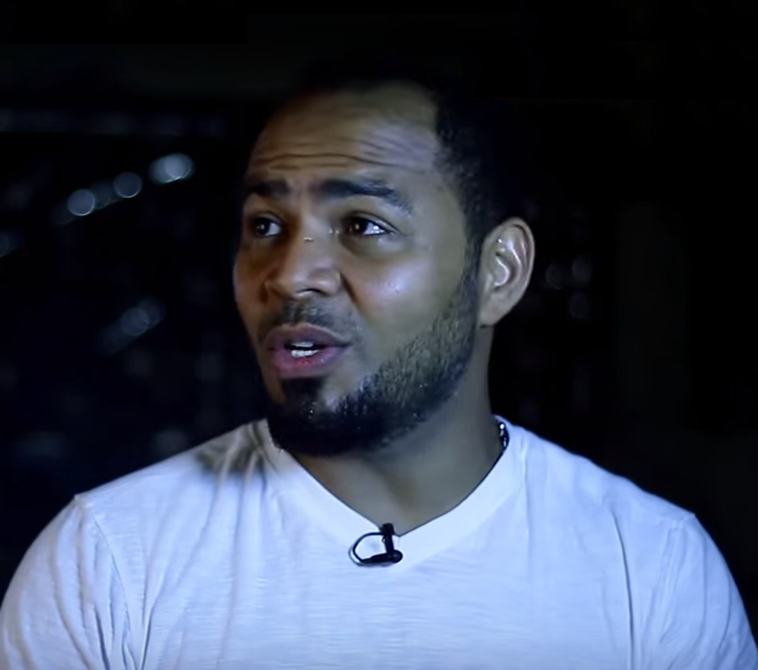
- Nouah in Gbomo Gbomo Express (2015)
- Born: Ramsey Tokunbo Nouah Jr. 19 December 1970 (age 55); Lagos, Nigeria
- Other name: Lover-Boy
- Education: University of Lagos
- Occupations: Actor; Film director
- Years active: 1993–present
- Television: Fortunes; Blood Sisters; Oghenekome (Broken)
- Spouse: Emelia Philip-Nouah
- Children: 3
- Honours: 2010 Africa Movie Academy Award—Best Actor in a Leading Role

Ramsey Tokunbo Nouah Jr. (born 19 December 1970) is a Nigerian actor and film director. He won the Africa Movie Academy Award for Best Actor in a Leading Role in 2010 for his performance in the movie The Figurine. He made his directorial debut with the film Living in Bondage: Breaking Free in 2019 and also went on to direct Nollywood classic Rattle Snake: The Ahanna Story which is a remake of Rattlesnake (1995).

== Early life ==
Ramsey Tokunbo Nouah Jr. was born in Lagos on 19 December 1970 to an Lebanese Jewish father and a Yoruba mother who hails from Owo, Ondo State. He grew up in Surulere, Lagos, where he attended Atara Primary School and Community Grammar School. He received a diploma in Mass Communications at the University of Lagos, after which he pursued a career in filming.

== Career ==
Nouah started acting in the early 1990s because he needed money for his General Certificate Education (GCE). His acting career kicked off when he starred as Jeff Akin-Thomas in the Nigerian TV soap opera Fortunes. He has since appeared in numerous films starring as the lead role, and has been called "Lover-Boy" for his numerous roles in romantic films. He is also considered to be one of the most sought-after actors in Nigeria.

In 2015, Nouah secured the rights to the 1992 movie Living in Bondage for a possible remake. In 2018, he announced his remake had become a sequel titled Living in Bondage: Breaking Free, which was released on 8 November 2019. Nouah, who played the new villain, made his directorial debut, and the film won 7 awards at the Africa Magic Viewers' Choice Awards.

== Personal life ==
Nouah is married to Emelia Philips-Nouah. The couple has two sons named Quincy Nouah and Joshua Nouah and one daughter named Desiree Nouah. In 2025, he announced that he has been married to his wife since 2002 and that she helped him build his life from scratch.

== Selected filmography ==
Key
†	Denotes films that have not yet been released

=== Film ===
Year	Title	Function	Cast
1996	Silent Night	Actor	with Joke Silva, Kate Henshaw, Segun Arinze, and Alex Usifo
1999	Camouflage	Actor	with Genevieve Nnaji and Bob-Manuel Udokwu
1999	End of the Wicked	Actor (Emeka)	with Alex Usifo Omiagbo and Helen Ukpabio
2000	Fugitive	Actor	with Genevieve Nnaji, Stella Damasus, and Rita Dominic
2000	Vuga	Actor (Foreigner)	
2001	The Battle of Love	Actor	with Segun Arinze and Kanayo O. Kanayo
2002	Power of Love	Actor (Chris)	with Genevieve Nnaji
2002	Valentino	Actor (Valentino)	with Genevieve Nnaji
2002	My Love	Actor	with Hilda Dokubo
2002	Church Business	Actor	with Genevieve Nnaji
2003	Break Up	Actor	with Genevieve Nnaji, Jim Iyke, and Pat Attah
2003	Emotional Crack	Actor (Chudi)	with Stephanie Okereke and Patience Ozokwor
2003	Honey	Actor (Edward)	with Pete Edochie and Genevieve Nnaji
2003	Super Love	Actor (Prince Obinna)	with Genevieve Nnaji, Pete Edochie, Andy Amenechi
2003	Passion and Pain	Actor (Francis)	with Genevieve Nnaji, Oby Edozie, Emeka Ike, Desmond Elliot
2003	True Love	Actor	with Omotola Jalade Ekeinde
2004	Across the Niger	Actor	
2004	Dangerous Twins	Actor (Taiye & Kehinde)	with Stella Damasus and Bimbo Akintola
	Heay Rain	Actor (Izu)	
2005	Coming to South Africa	Actor (Eddy)	
2005	Bleeding Love	Actor	
2007	The Faculty	Actor (Dave)	
2008	Chase	Actor	with Uche Jombo
2008	Sweet Tomorrow	Actor (Akan)	
2008	Tears in my Eyes	Actor	With Kate Henshaw-Nuttal, Larry Koldsweat, Ashley Nwosu
2009	Reloaded	Actor (Femi)	with Stephanie Okereke and Rita Dominic
2009	The Figurine	Actor (Femi)	with Kunle Afolayan
2009	Nnenda	Actor	
2009	Guilty Pleasures	Actor (Tesso)	with Nse Ikpe-Etim
2010	Private Storm	Actor (Alex)	with Omotola Jolade-Ekeinde, Ufuoma Ejenobor, and John Dumelo
2010	The Black Soul	Actor (Kalu)	
2011	Heart of a Fighter	Actor (Ikenna)	with Mercy Johnson, Enebeli Elebuwa, and Chika Ike
2011	Iru Oka	Actor	with Ayo Adesanya, Adebayo Salami, and Racheal Oniga
2012	Weekend Getaway	Actor (Dr. Mark)	with Genevieve Nnaji, Ini Edo, and Uti Nwachukwu
2012	Gem of the Rainforest	Actor	with Pere Egbi, Joe Grisaffi
2013	Confusion Na Wa	Actor (Emeka Nwosu)	with Toyin Alabi, Tunde Aladese
2014	Unguarded	Actor	with Chet Anekwe
2014	Busted Life	Actor	with Chet Anekwe
2014	30 Days in Atlanta	Richard	Actor
2015	Tempting Fate	Actor (Ugo)	with Dan Davies, Andrew Onochie, and John J Vogel
2015	The Grave Dust	Actor (Johnson Okwuozo)	with Joke Silva
2015	Gbomo Gbomo Express	Actor (Austin Mba)	with Shaffy Bello, Blossom Chukwujekwu
2016	'76	Actor (Captain Joseph Dewa)	with Rita Dominic and Ibinabo Fiberesima
2017	The Accidental Spy	Actor (Manny)	Directed by Roger Russell
2017	My Wife & I	Actor (Toyosi)	with Bimbo Ademoye, Rotimi Adelegan
2018	Crazy People	Actor (Ramsey)	with Chioma (Chigurl) Omerua, Sola Sobowale, Iretiola Doyle, Monalisa Chinda, Desmond Elliot and Kunle Afolayan
2018	Merry Men: The Real Yoruba Demons	Actor (Ayo Alesinloye)	with Remi Martins, Falz, Amaju Abioritsegbemi, Ayo Makun, Naz Okigbo, and Jim Iyke
2018	Lagos Landing	Actor (Bayo)	
2019	The Millions	Actor (Bem Kator)	With Toyin Abraham, Blossom Chukwujekwu
2019	Living in Bondage: Breaking Free	Director / Actor (Richard Williams)	with Enyinna Nwigwe and Swanky JKA
2019	Merry Men 2	Actor (Ayo Alesinloye)	with Ayo Makun, Jim Iyke, and Falz
2020	Deranged	Actor (Benny Essiam)	with Nadia Buari
2020	Rattle Snake: The Ahanna Story	Director	Stan Nze, Osas Ighodaro, Ayo Makun, Omotola Jalade Ekeinde
2020	Nneka the Pretty Serpent	Actor (Richard Williams)	With Kenneth Okolie, Bimbo Ademoye
2021	Slay	Actor (Richard)	With Dawn Thandeka King, Idris Sultan and Tumi Morake
2022	Blood Sisters	Actor (Uncle B)	With Kehinde Bankole, Nancy Isime
2023	Love, Lust & Other Things	Actor (Khalid Shettima)	With Kunle Remi, Wale Ojo
2023	Merry Men 3: Nemesis	Ayo	With Segun Arinze, Fred Amata
2024	A Country Called Ghana	Actor	With Charles Awurum, Tony Hans
2024	Tòkunbò	Director	Chidi Mokeme, Majid Michael, Adunni Ade, Gideon Okeke
2026	Ordinary People †	Actor	Adunni Ade, Chidi Mokeme, Michelle Dede, Lasisi Elenu

=== Television ===
Year	Title	Role	Notes
1993	Fortunes	Jeff	with Liz Benson and Regina Askia
2018	Oghenekome (Broken)		with Segun Arinze
2022	Blood Sisters	Uncle B	with Ini-Dima Okojie, Nancy Isime, Deyemi Okanlawon

== Awards and nominations ==
Year	Award ceremony	Prize	Film	Result	Ref
2010	Africa Movie Academy Awards	Best Actor in a Leading Role	The Figurine	Won	
2017	Africa Movie Academy Awards	Best Actor in a Leading Role	'76	Nominated	
2018	Best of Nollywood Awards	Best Actor in a Lead Role - English		Nominated	
2019	Best of Nollywood Awards	Best Actor in a Lead Role - English	Levi	Nominated	
2020	Africa Movie Academy Awards	Best Actor in a Supporting Role	Living in Bondage: Breaking Free	Won	
2020	Best of Nollywood Awards	Director of the Year	Living in Bondage: Breaking Free	Won	
2021	Best of Nollywood Awards	Director of the Year	Rattlesnake	Nominated	
2022	Africa Magic Viewers' Choice Awards	Best Overall Movie	Rattlesnake	Nominated	
2022	Africa Magic Viewers' Choice Awards	Best Director of the Year	Rattlesnake	Won	
