= Last Request (2019 film) =

- Directed by: James Abinibi
- Produced by: Moses Olufemi
- Starring: Yemi Blaq; Linda Osifo; Antar Laniyan; Bimbo Akintola
- Release date: 2019
- Country: Nigeria
- Language: English

Last Request is a 2019 Nigerian film produced by Moses Olufemi and directed by James Abinibi. The movies stars Yemi Blaq, Linda Osifo, Antar Laniyan and Bimbo Akintola.

== Synopsis ==
A peaceful family became unsettled when the husband was diagnosed with a brain tumor and his last request was something outrageous.

== Premiere ==
The movie premiered at Silicon Valley African Film Festival 2019 California, Black Film Festival Atlanta 2019, UK Nollywood Film Festival 2019 London, 23rd African Film Awards 2019 London and West African Film Festival Houston, Texas 2020.

== Awards and nominations ==
The film was nominated for 2019 UK film festival award, Best Director African Film Awards 2019, Best Producer African Film Awards 2019 and Best Supporting Actress African Film Awards 2019.

== Cast ==
- Yomi Blaq as Dipo Bankole
- Linda Osifo as Abiola Coker
- Bimbo Akintola Olashile Coker
- Antar Laniyan as David Coker
- Rekiya Attah as Mama D
- Lawal Dolapo as Bartender
- Peters Ijagbemi as Doctor Okon
- Wendy Obisesan as Nurse
- Aminat Olasimbo as Seyi Coker
- Felix Olojede as Uber Driver

== See also ==
- List of Nigerian films of 2019
