= Joyce Kalu =

Nigerian actress

- Born: 25 September 1970 (age 55); Ohafia, Abia state, Nigeria
- Education: Marketing, Lagos State University (LASU) Computer Science (Diploma)
- Occupations: Actress, film producer
- Years active: 2005-date
- Children: 3
- Awards: Best Actress in Nigeria, Best Actress in a Leading Role, Most Promising Act, and Most Prominent Actress in Nigeria

Joyce Kalu// (born 25 September 1970) is a Nigerian actress, film producer and director in the Nigerian Film Industry.

== Biography ==
Joyce Kalu was born on 25 September 1970 in Ohafia, Abia State, Southeastern Nigeria. The last daughter in a family of nine, she is now married with three children.

=== Education ===
Kalu's primary and secondary education was in Abia State, Nigeria. She also has a bachelor's degree in Marketing, which she obtained from the Lagos State University (LASU). Kalu also has a diploma in Computer Science.

=== Career ===
Joyce Kalu started her acting career in 2005. She became prominent after featuring in a Nollywood movie Take me Home. She is also a business woman.

In 2018, Joyce Kalu featured alongside Rita Dominic, Enyinna Nwigwe and other Nollywood actors in an award-winning movie Bound, which was produced by Lilian Afegbi. Bound won the Africa Magic Viewers' Choice Awards (AMVCA) 2018 for Best Indigenous Language (Igbo).

Based on her involvement in the Nigerian Film Industry, community and charity organizations, she was honored with a chieftaincy title of Apunawu I of Ohafia Community, Abia State by His Royal Paramount Ezieogo, Prof. U I.E. Imaga alongside the entire Ohafia monarchy. She was conferred with the chieftaincy title on January 1, 2016.

Joyce Kalu received an honorary award from the Niger Delta Icon and Dynamic Awards (NDID) as the Most Influential Actress of the year (2020).

== Selected filmography ==
- Take me Home (2007)
- Pride of a Woman (2007) as Presido
- A Walk in the Dark (2010) as Mrs. Obi
- A Dance for the Prince (2011) as Lolo
- Bridge of Contract (2012)
- Palace of Sorrow (2013) as Elizabeth
- The Illuminati Cult (2014) as Madam Dollar
- Queen Aziza (2016) as Chief Muma
- Dance of Grace (2016) as Amuche
- Prince on Fire (2018) as Queen
- Obianama (2018)
- Oderi gwugwu(2018)
- Isioma Scotland (2018)
- Bound (2018)
- Throne of Madness (2020) as Ezenwa's Mother
- Sister's Plot (2020) as Queen Ocheze
- Where Men Rule (2021) as Daluchi
- The Anointed Bride (2022) as Queen
- Angel in Crisis (2023) as Queeneth
