= Charles Awurum =

Nigerian actor and comedian

- Born: Lagos State, Nigeria
- Education: University of Calabar
- Occupations: Actor, comedian and movie director
- Spouse: Ifeyinwa Linda Awurum (married 2005)

Charles Awurum /ɑːˈwu.rum/ He was born on the 23rd December, 1964. He is a popular Nollywood Actor, Producer, Director and Comedian. He is from the Southeastern part of Nigeria Imo State precisely.

== Early life ==
Awurum grew up in Lagos State and had aspirations to be a professional actor from a young age. He wrote to the producers of Village Headmaster (discontinued Nigerian soap opera) that he aspired to be part of the soap opera cast. Eventually he got an invitation from the producers, but could not feature on the show due to his young age and minimal support from the people and his local community. He stuck to acting drama in church as well as the school he attended.

== Education ==
Charles had his Primary and Secondary education in Lagos State. He left Lagos State and went to pursue his University Education in the University of Calabar where he got a Bachelor's Degree in Theatre Arts.

== Career ==
Awurum started out acting in his church as well as his school so that by the time of graduation from college, he was already a good and versatile actor. He came into Nollywood taking only 'serious' roles, he later at a point in his career decided to do only comedy roles which in initial stage and conception of this idea, he was denied due to his "mean looks".

== Endorsement deals ==
In 2014, Awurum became a brand ambassador for multinational telecommunications company Globacom owned by Nigerian businessman Mike Adenuga.

== Hosting award shows ==
The 2016 'Award of Excellence', organized by Magic Lens Africa Film Academy Awards (MAFAA), was hosted by Charles Awurum.

== Personal life ==
Awurum has been married since 2005 and has 3 children. He is of the opinion that God will punish all those that fail to vote in the upcoming 2023 general election. He grew up in a family of 10 Children although 3 died. His Father worked in Nigeria Port Authority (NPA) before he died. Charles is a Veteran.

== Selected filmography ==
- A Country Called Ghana (2024)
- The Rising Sun (2023)
- Lockdown (2021) as Papa Sunny
- The Album (2020) as Ihejirika
- Trusted Enemy I & II (2016) as Johnbull
- Gold Dust Ikenga (2015) as Raymond
- Jack & Jill I & II (2011) as Kelvin
- Most Wanted Kidnappers I & II (2010) as Mgada
- Yahooze Prophets I & II (2009)
- Marcus 'D' Millionaire I & II (2008)
- Away Match I & II (2007) as Edwin
- Fools on the Run (2007)
- Game Fools Play I & II (2007) as Theo
- JohnBull & Rosekate (2007) as Anthony
- Lost in the Jungle I & II (2007) as Sumo
- Toronto Connection I & II (2007)
- Four Forty I & II (2006) as Odoh
- Silence of the Gods I & II (2006)
- Store Keeper I & II (2006)
- The Barrister I & II (2006) as Jonah
- The Journalist I & II (2006)
- Friends & Lovers I & II (2005)
- I Need a Man I & II (2005)
- Nothing For Nothing I, II & III (2005) as Acho
- No Way Out I & II (2005)
- A Million Madness (2004) as Nsi Udene
- Love & Marriage (2004)
- World Apart I & II (2004) as Godwin
- Under Fire (2003)
- Sweet Banana I & II (2003) as Okezie
- Battle Line I & II (2002)
- Ifeonye Metalu (2002) as Priest
- Wisdom & Riches I & II (2002)
- Hatred II (2001) as Native Doctor
- The Three Egungun Brothers

=== TV series ===
- New Masquerade

== See also ==
- List of Nigerian actors
- List of Nigerian Comedians
