= Emem Inwang =

Nigerian actress and model

- Education: University of Uyo
- Occupations: Model; Actress
- Years active: 2011-present
- Spouse: Moses Inwang

Emem Inwang is a Nigerian actress and model. She was formerly Emem Udonquak. On 18 October 2014, she won the 2014 Nollywood Movies Awards (3rd edition) for Best Actress in a Supporting Role in the movie Itoro. The event was held at the Intercontinental Hotel, Lagos.

== Biography ==
Emen Inwang is a Nigerian actress and model from Akwa Ibom state, Nigeria. She celebrates her birthday on 8 September. On 5 April 2014, Emem married Moses Inwang, a Nigerian movie director and producer. They had their first child in 2015.

=== Career ===
Emem is a model and became prominent when she was crowned the 2011/2012 Calabar Carnival Queen on Friday 23 December 2011. The Pageant was sponsored by First Bank of Nigeria. In the same year, she signed an ambassadorial deal and was officially the Calabar’s Tourism Ambassador and spokesperson for Mothers Against Child Abandonment (An initiative of the Wife of the former Governor of Cross River State, Obioma Liyel-Imoke). However, she delved into acting and has featured in several Nollywood movies.

== Selected filmography ==
- Dr. Love (2020) as Loretta
- Itoro (2013) as Itoro
- Lock Down (2021)
- Unroyal (2020) as Matilda
- Alter Ego (2017) as Aisha
- Crazy People (2018) as Clara
- Onyeegwu (2023) as Monica
- Men Love Lust (2024) as Nengi
- Special Assistant (2023) as Sharon
- Forever Yours (2024) as Benny
- Dangerous Hustle (2024) as Tiana

== Accolades ==
Award and Nominations
Awards	Category	Result	Ref.
2014 Nollywood Movies Awards	Best Actress in a Supporting Role	Won	
2014 Nollywood Movies Awards	Best Rising Star (female)	Nominated	
2018 African Movies Viewer's Choice Awards	Best Supporting Actress	Nominated	
