= Matilda Lambert =

Nigerian actress and film producer

- Born: Matilda Gogo Lambert; 13 April
- Education: University of Abuja; University of Nigeria, Nsukka
- Occupation: Actress
- Notable work: Unroyal

Matilda Gogo Lambert is a Nigerian actress, movie producer, model, and CEO of Tilda Goes Green Foundation. She made her movie debut in the film The Celebrities alongside Mike Ezuruonye. Her performance in the movie brought her to prominence and earned her leading roles in other Nollywood movies.

== Early life and education ==
Matilda Gogo Lambert was born on 13 April and raised in Port Harcourt. She is from Andoni, Rivers State. Lambert received early education at Police Children Primary School and had her secondary education at the Federal Government Girls' College, Abuloma in Port Harcourt. She studied at the University of Abuja for a bachelor's degree in philosophy and later earned a master's degree in socio-political philosophy from the University of Nigeria, Nsukka.

== Career ==
Lambert began her acting career in her second year in the university when she featured in the film The Celebrity alongside Mike Ezuruonye. Her performance in the movie brought her to the limelight and she began starring in other movies. In 2020, she produced a movie, Unroyal in which she starred in the leading role as Princess Boma. The movie premiered in March 2020 and was released on Netflix in August same year. The movie won the "Best Use of Costume in a Movie" and "Movie With the Best Sound" at the 2020 Best of Nollywood Awards. Her other productions as of 2022 include Deepest Cut, Instaguru and Kendra.

== Filmography ==
- Blood Vessel (2023) as Onyi's Mum
- Stay Dead (2022)
- Kendra (2021) as Kendra
- Star Girl (2021) as Lilian
- More Than a Moment (2020) as Steph
- Ebere's Ordeal (2020) as Ozioma
- Unroyal (2020) as Princess Boma
- The Engagement (2016) as Joy
- Ogbanta the Family Hunter (2015) as Amaka
- Beauty of the Mind (2014) as Presenter 1
- Jackie Goes to School (2014) as Princess
- The Celebrities
- My Best Friend
- From House Girl to Madam
- My Virginity
- Amanda
