= Money Miss Road =

2022 Nigerian action-comedy movie

- Directed by: Obi Emelonye
- Produced by: Joy Odiete
- Starring: Jidekene Achufusi; Josh Alfred; Charly Boy
- Music by: Joel Christian Goffin
- Production companies: The Blue Pictures Entertainment, Codeo Limited and The Nollywood Factory
- Release date: 22 July 2022
- Country: Nigeria
- Language: English

Money Miss Road is a 2022 Nigerian action-comedy movie produced by Joy Odiete, under the collaboration of The Blue Pictures Entertainment, Codeo Limited and The Nollywood Factory. It was directed by Obi Emelonye, a well-known Producer of thriller movies like Last Flight to Abuja and Mirror Boy. The film starred Jidekene Achufusi, Josh Alfred and Charly Boy, and was released on 22 July 2022.

== Synopsis ==
The movie revolves around the lives of two friends, Josiah (Josh2funny) and Joseph (Jide Achufusi) whose accidental encounter with a criminal warlord Diokpa (Charly Boy) gave them a life of luxury and misery as they battled for survival.

== Reception ==
Reactions to Money Miss Road were mostly negative. Premium Times remarked the film was overstretched by the producer in their description of action comedy. It was also criticised for nudity in a family-orientated movie, poor humor, and watered-down action.

== Cast ==
- Jide Kene Achufusi as Joe
- Melvin Oduah
- Josh2Funny
- Tomie Ajiboye as Omoloba
- Oma Iyasara
- Charly Boy.
