= Rosaline Meurer =

Gambian-born Nigerian actress (born 1992)

- Born: Rosaline Ufuoma Meurer; 15 February 1992 (age 34); The Gambia
- Other names: Rosy Meurer
- Occupations: Actress; producer
- Years active: 2009–present
- Spouse: Olakunle Churchill (m. 2019)
- Children: 2
- Awards: 2016 Nigeria Goodwill Ambassador Awards

Rosaline Ufuoma Meurer (born 15 February 1992), is a Gambian-born Nigerian actress and producer. She is most known for her 2014 role as Kaylah in the TV series Oasis and 2018 role as Kemi Alesinloye in Ayo Makun's Merry Men: The Real Yoruba Demons.

== Early life and education ==
Meurer grew up in The Gambia where she had her early education. She has a diploma in business management and studied photography.

== Career ==
While growing up, Meurer loved aircraft and flying and dreamt of becoming an air hostess or a pilot. She started her career as a model in The Gambia, before moving to Nigeria in 2009. She was discovered in The Gambia in 2009 by Nigerian actor and politician, Desmond Elliot who advised her to try acting in Nigeria. She moved to Lagos, Nigeria, and started her movie career, starring in a minor role in the 2009 Emem Isong's film Spellbound and the 2011 film In the Cupboard.

In 2012, she also starred in a minor role in Weekend Getaway. After starring in the 2012 movie, she stopped acting for a while and went back to school in The Gambia, before coming back to Nigeria to continue her acting career. When she returned in 2014, she joined the cast of the TV series Oasis, starring in a lead role as Kaylah. The following year, she played Nneka in Damaged Petl, and starred in Red Card and Open Marriage.

In 2017, she starred in the main role in Our Dirty Little Secret. In the same year, she played Monica in the TV series Philip and Polycarp and starred in The Incredible Father, Pebbles of Love, and Our Dirty Little Secret. She later went on to produce her first movie The Therapist's Therapy. In 2018, she played the lead role as Valerie in Eniola Badmus's film Karma and starred as Kemi Alesinloye in Ayo Makun's Merry Men: The Real Yoruba Demons.

== Philanthropy ==
On 25 May 2017, Meurer rehabilitated and commissioned Udu Main Market Water Project in Udu, Delta State. As an ambassador of the Big Church Foundation on Women and Child, she donated money to pregnant women at 3-H Clinic and Maternity in Warri, Delta State.

== Other ventures ==
Meurer is an ambassador of Multisheen Ebony. In 2015, she became an ambassador of the Big Church Foundation on Women and Children. She appeared on the cover of the April 2017 House Of Maliq Magazine issue. In April 2019, she signed an endorsement deal with DoctorCare247. Four months later, she signed an endorsement deal with Glo.

== Personal life ==
Meurer was born in The Gambia to a Dutch father and Nigerian mother from Delta State. She is the first child in a family of three. She is now married to Olakunle Churchill and has two children with him.

== Filmography ==
=== Film ===
Year	Title	Role	Notes
2009	Spellbound		
2011	In the Cupboard	Jenkin's Secretary	Drama
2012	Weekend Getaway		
2015	Damaged Petal	Nneka	Drama
2015	Red Card	Kachi	
2015	Open Marriage	Becky	Drama
2016	My Sister And I		
2017	Pebbles of Love	Vanessa	
2017	Our Dirty Little Secret	Anita	Drama
2017	The Incredible Father	Susan	
2018	Merry Men: The Real Yoruba Demons	Kemi Alesinloye	Action / Comedy
2018	Karma	Valerie	
2019	Your Dream Girl	Melinda	Drama / Romance
2019	Table of Men		
2019	Accidental Affair	Jenny	Drama / Romance / Thriller
2019	Merry Men 2	Kemi Alesinloye	Action / Comedy
2020	Circle of Sinners	Betty	Drama
2021	Easy Gold		Comedy
2022	Judas	Naomi Judas	Drama
2023	The Plan	Atika	Tv Mini Series

=== Television ===
Year	Title	Role	Notes
2014	Oasis	Kaylah	Lead role
2017	Philip and Polycarp	Monica	Main role

== Awards and nominations ==
Year	Award	Category	Result	Ref
2017	City People Movie Awards	Most Promising Actress of the Year (English)	Nominated	
2017	La Mode Green	Special Recognition Award	Won	
2016	Nigeria Goodwill Ambassador Awards	Next Rated Actress	Won	
