= Chidi Mokeme =

Nigerian actor (born 1972)

- Born: 17 March 1972 (age 54)
- Education: Institute of Management and Technology (IMT)
- Occupations: Actor & Television Presenter
- Spouse: Olumba Mokeme (m. 2012)
- Children: 2

Chidi Mokeme // (born 17 March 1972) is a Nigerian actor and reality show host. He was the host of Gulder Ultimate Search reality show. Acclaimed for his film and TV performances, he is also noted as a style icon.

== Early life ==
Chidi Mokeme hails from Oba in Idemili South LGA of Anambra State, southeastern Nigeria. He had the chance to experience the many cultures of Nigeria's major ethnic groups. He attended Salvation Army Primary School in Surulere, Lagos State, southwestern Nigeria, for his elementary education. He studied at the Federal Government College in Minna, Niger State, in the north-central region of Nigeria, and then continued on to the Institute of Management and Technology (IMT) in Enugu State, where he received a Higher National Diploma in Computer Science. Mokeme proudly speaks Hausa, Yoruba, and his native language, Igbo. He stands out as being multi-talented. Despite his preference for science, he has always had a strong passion for acting, and the majority of his friends are students of art.

== Gulder Ultimate Search ==
Mokeme was the anchor of the television show Gulder Ultimate Search for a couple of years.

== Personal life ==
Mokeme is married to Jean Olumba Mokeme. She was born and raised in the United States of America and works there as a doctor and pharmacist. They exchanged vows on 28 April 2012. They have a son, Noah Mokeme.

Mokeme launched his sex toys company in 2009. He has a son, Emem Daniel Mokeme, from a previous relationship with Adia Ukoyen, a journalist. Adia Ukoyen served as the personal assistant for media matters to Godswill Obot Akpabio when he was the governor of Akwa Ibom State.

== Filmography ==
Year	Title	Role
2025	To Kill a Monkey	Teacher
2024	Out of Breath	Izu
2024	Life and Dirt	Ajazi
2024	Tokunbo	Gaza
2023	Love and Life	Dekunle
2023	No Way Through	Apostle
2023	Merry Men 3	Dafe
2023	Shanty Town	Aboderin(Scar)
2022	Bamboozler	Jax
2022	Half heaven	Grand Tita
2021	The Therapist	Rotimi Bankole
2021	Entangle	
2020	Akachi	Gozie
2017	Mr & Mrs: Chapter Two	Kobi
2016	76	Major Gomos
2016	Yellow Cassava	Dan
2014	Raging Passion	Harry
2008	Critical Condition	Jubril
2007	Ultimate Warrior	
2007	Ultimate Warrior 2	
2007	Minority Tension	
2007	Who Will Tell the President	Jang
2007	Who Will Tell the President 2	Jang
2006	Boiling Point	
2006	Crime Planner	Obinna
2006	High Stake	Maxwell
2006	Last Kobo	Mike
2006	Saviour	Peter
2005	Anini	Osunbor
2005	Back Drop	
2005	Blood Battle	
2003	Abuja Connection	Maxwell
2003	Omotara Johnson	
2003	The Seed (with Stella Damasus-Aboderin)	
2003	Honey	
2003	The Cross of Love	Ikenna senior
2002	Agony of a mother	
2001	Married to a Witch	Henry
2001	Kids Are Angry	Ray
2001	Desperado	
2001	Fire Dancer	Pablo
1999	Igodo	
1999	Prisoner Of Love	
1998	Full Moon	Acid
1998	Rapture	

== Awards and nominations ==
Year	Award	Category	Film	Result	Ref
2023	Africa Magic Viewers' Choice Awards	Best Actor In A Drama, Movie Or TV Series	Shanty Town	Nominated	

== See also ==
- List of Nigerian actors
