= Linda Osifo =

Nigerian actress (born 1991)

Linda Adesuwa Osifo
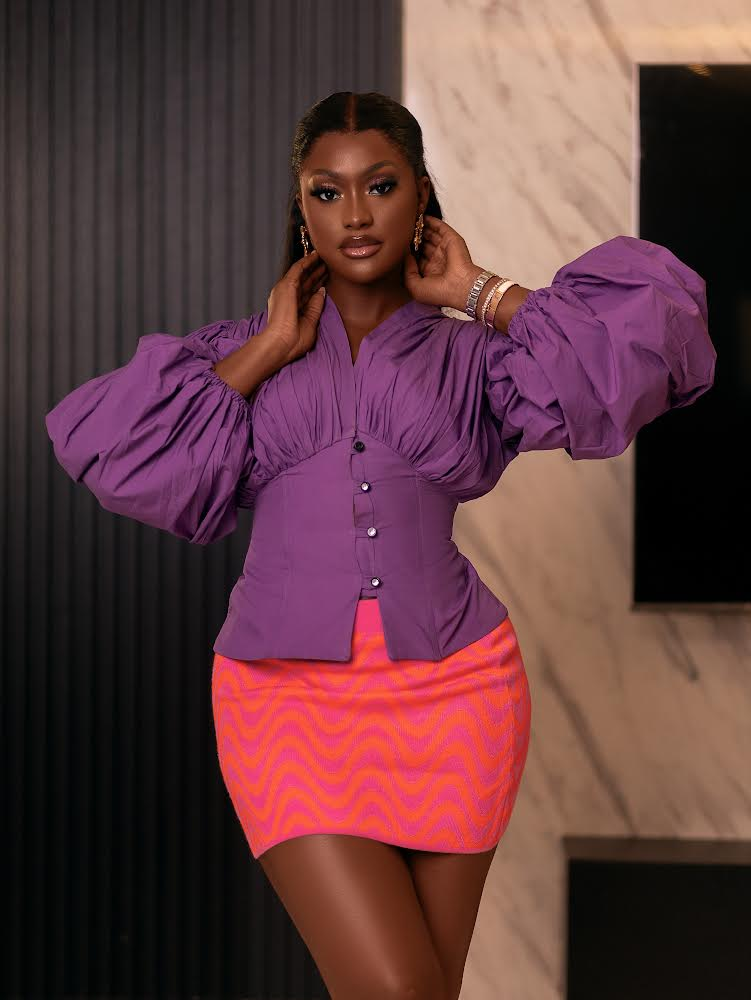
- Osifo in 2023
- Born: Linda Adesuwa Osifo; 27 July 1991 (age 35); Benin City, Edo State, Nigeria
- Citizenship: Nigerian, Canadian
- Education: York University
- Occupations: Actress, TV host, Speaker, Humanitarin
- Years active: 2013–present
- Notable work: Desperate Housewives Africa; Jemeji; King Akubueze; Fifty; Hidden Trut; Believe In You; Lemonade; Heart of Two Halves; Luckily Unfortunate; Target You; Wildin

Linda Osifo (born 27 July 1991) is a Nigerian actress and television host. She was first runner-up Miss Nigeria Entertainment Canada 2011 and 2nd runner up Miss AfriCanada 2011 beauty pageant. In 2015, Linda was nominated for the ELOY awards for her role in the hit TV series: Desperate Housewives Africa by Ebonylife TV– An adaptation of the ABC Studio franchise ‘Desperate Housewives’.

== Early life ==
Linda was born in Benin City, Edo State, Nigeria. She grew up with her grand mother and moved to Canada at the age of 16 but she spent most of her adult years in Toronto, Ontario, Canada before relocating to Lagos, Nigeria to pursue her acting career. She is the first daughter and middle child of her family. After graduating from St Thomas Aquinas High School, she obtained her Bachelors of Arts degree in Psychology from York University in Toronto Canada in 2013.

== Career ==
She had her debut acting role in 2012 when she starred in Family Secrets, in New Jersey, USA directed by Ikechukwu Onyeka. Upon her return to Nigeria in late 2013, she starred in her first Nollywood film, ‘King Akubueze’, directed by Nonso Emekewe. She was featured in the popular Nigerian soap opera Tinsel as ‘Nina Fire’. In 2017, Linda played the role of Adesuwa Dakolo in EbonyLife’s spin-off drama series, ‘Fifty’ and Africa Magic’s television series ‘Jemeji’, playing the role of Noweyhon. Osifo is currently co-hosting the "Give 'n' Take National Jackpot" gameshow alongside Segun Arinze.

During the 12th Headies Award she presented alongside Sina Peller the 'Best Vocal Performance (Male)' award which was won by artist Praiz and 'Best Vocal Performance (Female)' award which was won by Omawumi. In June 2018, she was involved in the Campari 'Make it Red' campaign being part of the cast in the advert alongside former Big Brother Nigeria housemate Tobi Bakre and artist 2baba.

== Filmography ==
=== Film ===
Year	Film	Role	Notes	Ref
2015	Tinsel	Nina Fire		
2017	Hidden Truth	Linda	Directed by Nwaogburu Nelson Jombo	
2019	Merry Men 2	Chief Omole	Directed by Moses Inwang	
2019	Life As It Is	Jumoke		
2020	Son of Mercy	Princess	Directed by Amen Imasuen	
2020	Believe In You	Alysha		
2020	Lemonade	Alero	Directed by Lummie Edevbie	
2020	Last Request	Abiola Coker		
2020	Unroyal	Princess Boma	Directed by Moses Inwang	
2021	Tanwa Savage	Tanwa Savage		
2021	A Naija Christmas	Vera	Directed by Kunle Afolayan	
2022	Woke	Ejura	Directed by Abimbola Olagunju	
2023	The Men's Club	Katherine		

Year	Film	Role	Notes	Ref
2020	Heart of Two Halves		Directed by Tissy Nnachi	
2022	Luckily Unfortunate		Directed by Eric Stephenson	
2019	AMCOP: swivel	Ebere	Directed by Paul Iheanyichukwu Igwe	

=== Television ===
Year	Title	Role	Notes
2015	Desperate Housewives Africa	Rhetta Moore	Television film
2017	Fifty (50)	Adesuwa	Television film

=== Music videos ===
Year	Title	Artist	Role	Ref.
2020	"Target You"	2face Idibia featuring Syemca	Love interest	
2014	"Wildin"	MMZY	Love interest	

== Awards and recognition ==
Year	Event	Prize	Result
2011	Miss Nigeria Entertainment Canada		First Runner Up
2015	African Entertainment Awards Canada	Best Actor	Won
2015	ELOY Awards	Best Actress in TV Series Desperate Housewives	Nominated
2015	ELOY Awards	Best Actress in a Series	Nominated
2016	Diaspora Entertainment Awards	Best Actress	Nominated
2018	Starzz Awards	Creative Actor of the Year	Won
2020	Toronto Nollywood International Film Festival.	Best Supporting Actress	Nominated

== Other ventures ==
=== Philanthropy ===
Linda’s philanthropic aspirations paved the way for her LAO Foundation, an acronym for Love and Oneness; a non-governmental organization (NGO) posed with the task of eradicating poverty and illiteracy in Nigeria and Africa. Love And Oneness (LAO Foundation), has made donations of seven sets of computers to the Little Saints Orphanage, Shasha, Akowonjo, Lagos. On the occasion of her 31st birthday celebration on July 27, 2022, Linda Osifo commemorated the milestone by contributing educational Information and Communication Technology (ICT) resources to the Living Fountain Orphanage

== See also ==
- List of Nigerian actors
