= Damilola Adegbite =

Nigerian actress

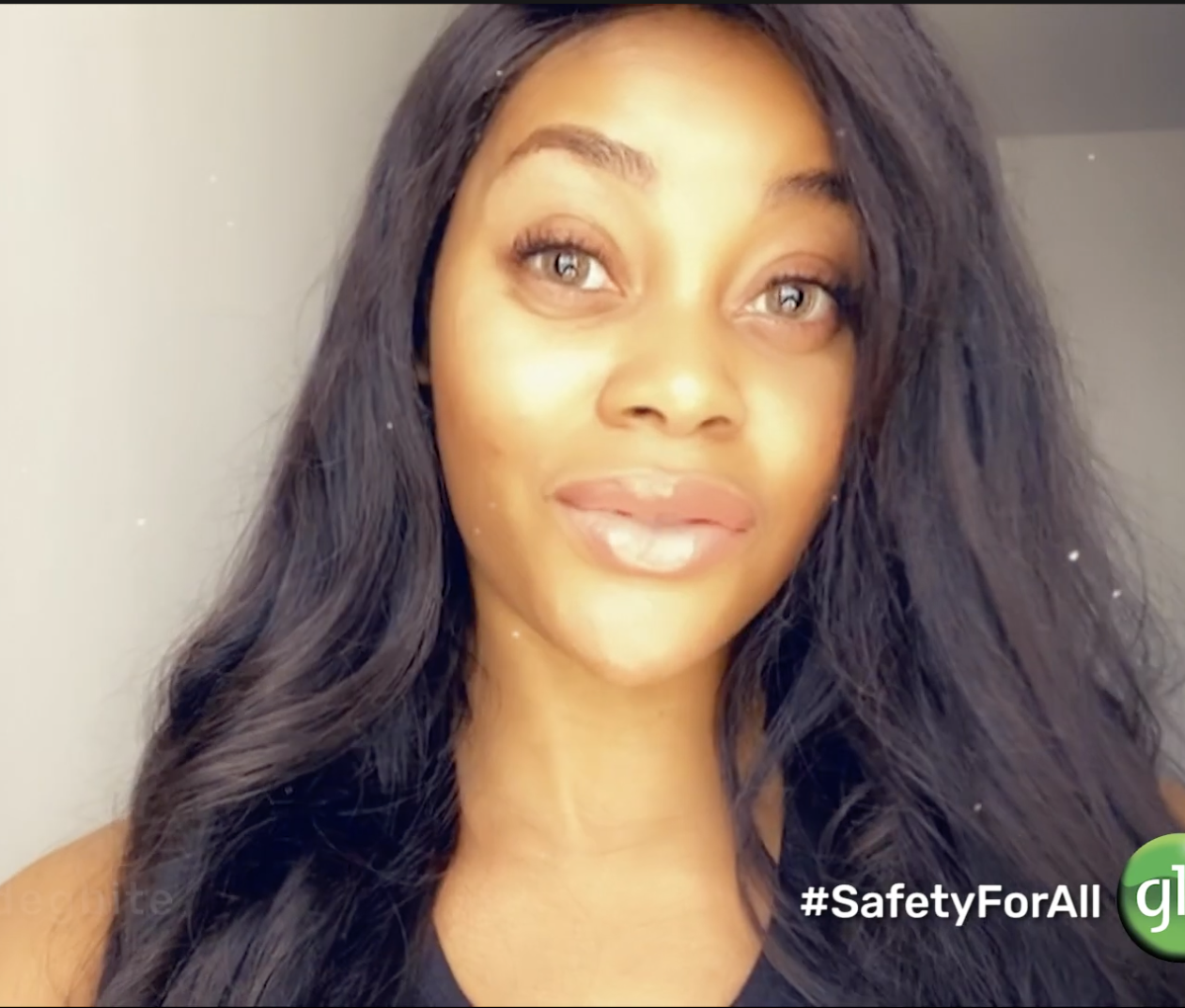
- Adegbite in 2020
- Born: Oluwadamilola Adegbite; 18 May 1985 (age 41); Surulere, Lagos, Lagos State, Nigeria
- Citizenship: Nigerian
- Education: Bowen University, Queen's College, Lagos
- Occupations: Actress, model, TV host
- Years active: 2008–present
- Spouse: Chris Attoh (m. 2015–2017)
- Children: 1

Damilola Adegbite (born Oluwadamilola Adegbite; 18 May 1985) is a Nigerian actress, model, and television personality. She played Telema Duke in the soap opera Tinsel, and Kemi Williams in the movie Flower Girl. She won Best Actress in a TV Series at the 2011 Nigeria Entertainment Awards.

== Biography ==
Adegbite was born in Surulere, Lagos State. She attended Queen's College in Yaba, Lagos and studied business administration at Bowen University in Iwo, Osun State. Tinsel was her acting debut, and she has also appeared in TV commercials and hosted programs on TV.

== Personal life ==
In August 2014, Adegbite got engaged to Chris Attoh, a fellow actor she met on set of the soap opera Tinsel. In September 2014, the couple welcomed their son Brian. Adegbite and Attoh got married privately in Accra, Ghana on 14 February 2015. In September 2017, news broke that Adegbite's marriage to husband Chris Attoh had crashed. Adegbite had sparked split rumours after she deleted Chris Attoh's surname from her social-media accounts She also unfollowed him on Instagram and deleted all photos of him from her social media account. Hours later, in an interview, Chris Attoh confirmed his marriage to Damilola Adegbite was over.

== Filmography ==
=== Films ===
Year	Title	Role	Notes	Ref
2010	6 Hours To Christmas	Pebbles		
2013	Flower Girl	Kemi Williams		
2017	The Missing	Alero		
2017	Banana Island Ghost	Self	Cameo	
2017	Isoken	Joke	Also starring Dakore Akande, Joseph Benjamin	
2018	Merry Men: The Real Yoruba Demons	Dera Chukwu	Action / Comedy	
2018	From Lagos with Love	Samantha	Drama / Romance	
2019	Coming From Insanity	Oyin Martins	Directed by Akinyemi Sebastian Akinropo	
2019	Heaven's Hell	Janet Cole		
2019	Merry Men 2: Another Mission	Dera Chukwu	Directed by Moses Inwang	
2020	Crossroads	Temi Bamisaiye	Directed by Seyi Siwoku	
2025	After 30			

=== Television ===
Year	Title	Role	Notes
2008–2012	Tinsel	Telema Duke	
2015–present	Before 30	Temilola Coker	

=== Theatre ===
Year	Title	Role
	The V Monologues	
