= Merry Men: The Real Yoruba Demons =

2018 film by Toka Mcbaror

- Theatrical release poster
- Directed by: Toka Mcbaror
- Screenplay by: Anthony Kehinde Joseph
- Story by: AY Makun
- Produced by: Darlington Abuda; Patrick Ovoke Odjegba
- Starring: Ramsey Nouah; AY Makun; Jim Iyke; Damilola Adegbite; Richard Mofe-Damijo; Iretiola Doyle; Falz; Jide Kosoko; Rosaline Meurer; Nancy Isime
- Narrated by: Ramsey Nouah
- Cinematography: Rapha Bola
- Edited by: Patrick Ovoke Odjegba; Isaace Benjamin; Gem Owas
- Music by: Kolade Morakinyo
- Production companies: Corporate World Entertainment; Gush Media; FilmOne
- Distributed by: FilmOne Distributions
- Release date: 28 September 2018
- Running time: 106 minutes
- Country: Nigeria
- Languages: English; Yoruba; Pidgin
- Box office: ₦235.6 million

Merry Men: The Real Yoruba Demons is a 2018 Nigerian action comedy film written by Anthony Kehinde Joseph, produced by Darlington Abuda, and directed by Toka Mcbaror. It is the first installment in the Merry Men (film series). It stars an ensemble cast, which includes: Ramsey Nouah, AY Makun, Jim Iyke, Damilola Adegbite, Richard Mofe-Damijo, Iretiola Doyle, Falz, Jide Kosoko, Rosaline Meurer, and Nancy Isime.

== Plot ==
The film is set in Abuja. Four rich men (the Merry Men) seduce powerful women, and live like Robin Hood. They embody the stereotypical description of a Yoruba demon hence the subtitle of the movie's name. They face their biggest challenge yet when they antagonize a notorious and corrupt politician who plans to demolish a village to build a shopping mall. The four men scheme to save the people of the village.

== Cast ==
- Ramsey Nouah as Ayo Alesinloye
- Ayo Makun as Amaju Abioritsegbemi
- Jim Iyke as Naz Okigbo
- Folarin "Falz" Falana as Remi Martins
- Damilola Adegbite as Dera Chukwu
- Richard Mofe-Damijo as Chief Alesinloye
- Rosaline Meurer as Kemi Alesinloye
- Ireti Doyle as Dame Maduka
- Nancy Isime as Sophie
- Lilian Esoro as Mrs Anyanwu
- Jide Kosoko as Chief Omole
- Osas Ighodaro as Chidinma (blogger)
- Francis Duru as Inspector Jack
- Ali Nuhu as Bank Client Service Head
- Faithia Balogun as Mama Abdul
- Samuel Ajibola as Abdul
- Segun Arinze as Bank IT Staff

== Reception ==
According to Nollyrated, "The plot of the movie was like a basket that leaked everywhere, and there were hardly any firm connections in the stories. Also, some of the characters were unnecessary to the overall story. This is nothing against the actors’ skills, but some of the characters added nothing to the story."

According to Nollywood Reinvented, "The best thing about this movie is the picture quality. The shots are crisp, the sets are luxurious, the aura is sold; but the action choreography is a joke, the lines fall flat, and all the impact is nonexistent. The nearly 2hr debacle is chock full with unnecessary cameos and forced insertion of party music to elevate the mood, but there's barely any cohesion here to drive the movie along."

According to bbfc, "Moderate violence includes a man gripping other men's neck, and a scene in which a man is shot, with brief sight of some bloody detail."

== Sequel ==
A sequel titled Merry Men 2 was released on December 20, 2019. This was followed by a third installment, Merry Men 3, which premiered on October 13, 2023.

== See also ==
List of Nigerian films of 2018
