= Iretiola Doyle =

Nigerian actress (born 1967)

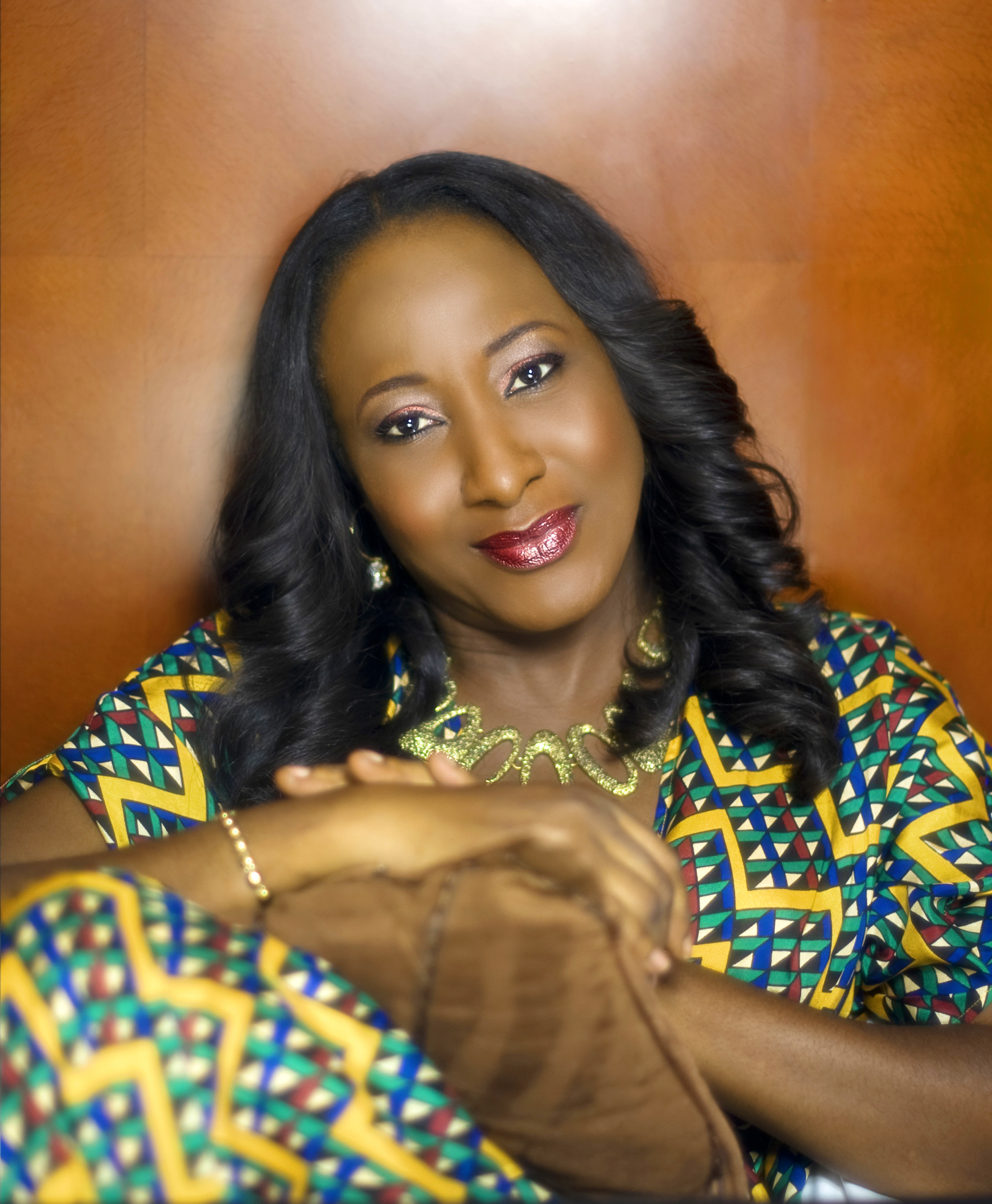
- Born: Iretiola Olusola Ayinke; 3 May 1967 (age 59); Ondo State, Nigeria
- Citizenship: Nigeria
- Education: University of Jos
- Occupations: Actress; TV presenter
- Children: 6
- Writing career
- Notable work: Across the Niger

Iretiola Olusola Doyle (born 5 May 1967) is a Nigerian actress, entertainer, TV presenter, writer, and public speaker.

== Early life and education ==
Doyle was born on 3 May 1967 in Ondo State but spent her early years with her family in Boston, United States. After returning to Nigeria, she attended Christ's School Ado Ekiti and obtained diploma in Mass Communication and also graduated from the University of Jos with a degree in Theatre Arts.

== Career ==
Doyle is a writer, actor, producer and presenter. She produced and presented her own fashion and lifestyle show titled Oge With Iretiola for ten years and at different times anchored several television shows, like Morning Ride, Today On STV and Nimasa This Week on Channels TV.

She was nominated at the 2016 Africa Movie Academy Awards in the Best Actress In A Leading Role category for her portrayal of Dr. Elizabeth in the Ebony Life film Fifty. She also appeared in The Arbitration and The Wedding Party, Other films include Dinner and Madam President. On television, she has created characters on shows like Fuji House Of Commotion, Dowry, and Gidi Up.

== Personal life ==
She was married to Patrick Doyle and they had six children together. They had allegedly been separated since 2017, but their divorce was officially confirmed in 2023.

During the EndSars protest across the country when some palliatives were looted, Ireti said in her Twitter handle that it is as a result of hunger. She posted "I know we are renowned for loving awoof, but greed wasn't the reason for the stampede on palliatives, it was hunger. Acute hunger. That is something your leaders will never live down."

== Selected filmography ==
=== Film ===
- Across the Niger (2004)
- Sitanda (2006) as Princess
- Torn (2013) as Ovo
- Fifty (2015) as Elizabeth
- The Therapist (2016) as Ogadi
- The Arbitration (2016) as Funlayo Johnson
- The Wedding Party (2016) as Obianuju Onwuka
- Dinner (2016) as Elizabeth A. George
- Fusion (2016) as Mrs. Mabel Peterson
- The Grudge (2016) as Kemi
- Something Wicked (2017) as Hauwa
- GuynMan (2017) as Molade
- The Wedding Party 2 (2017) as Obianuju Onwuka
- Merry Men: The Real Yoruba Demons (2018) as Mrs. Dame Maduka
- Crazy People (2018) as Regina
- Kasanova (2019) as Ms. Jessica
- Merry Men 2 (2019) as Mrs. Dame Maduka
- Therapy (2020) as Dr. Benedicta
- Day of Destiny (2021) as Ifeoma
- A Tune Away (2022) as Stella
- Madam Koi Koi (2023) as Mother Superior
- The Black Book (2023) as Commissioner
- Love Notes (2024) as Maris
- All's Fair in Love (2024) as Chief

=== Television ===
- Tinsel (2008-2015) as Sheila Ade-Williams
- For Coloured Girls (2011) (Note: For Colored Girls shouldn't be confused with Tyler Perry's 2010 film of the same name. It is actually the Nigerian adaptation of the American stage play, For colored girls who have considered suicide / when the rainbow is enuf.)
- Gidi Up (2014–present) as Illa
- Noughts and Crosses (2022)
- Flawsome (2022)
- The Power (2023) as Shola Ojo
- Agu (2023-present)
- All of Us (2024) as Proprietress
- Princess on a Hill (2024) as Madam Obiora

== See also ==
- List of Nigerian actors
