= Jim Iyke =

Nigerian actor

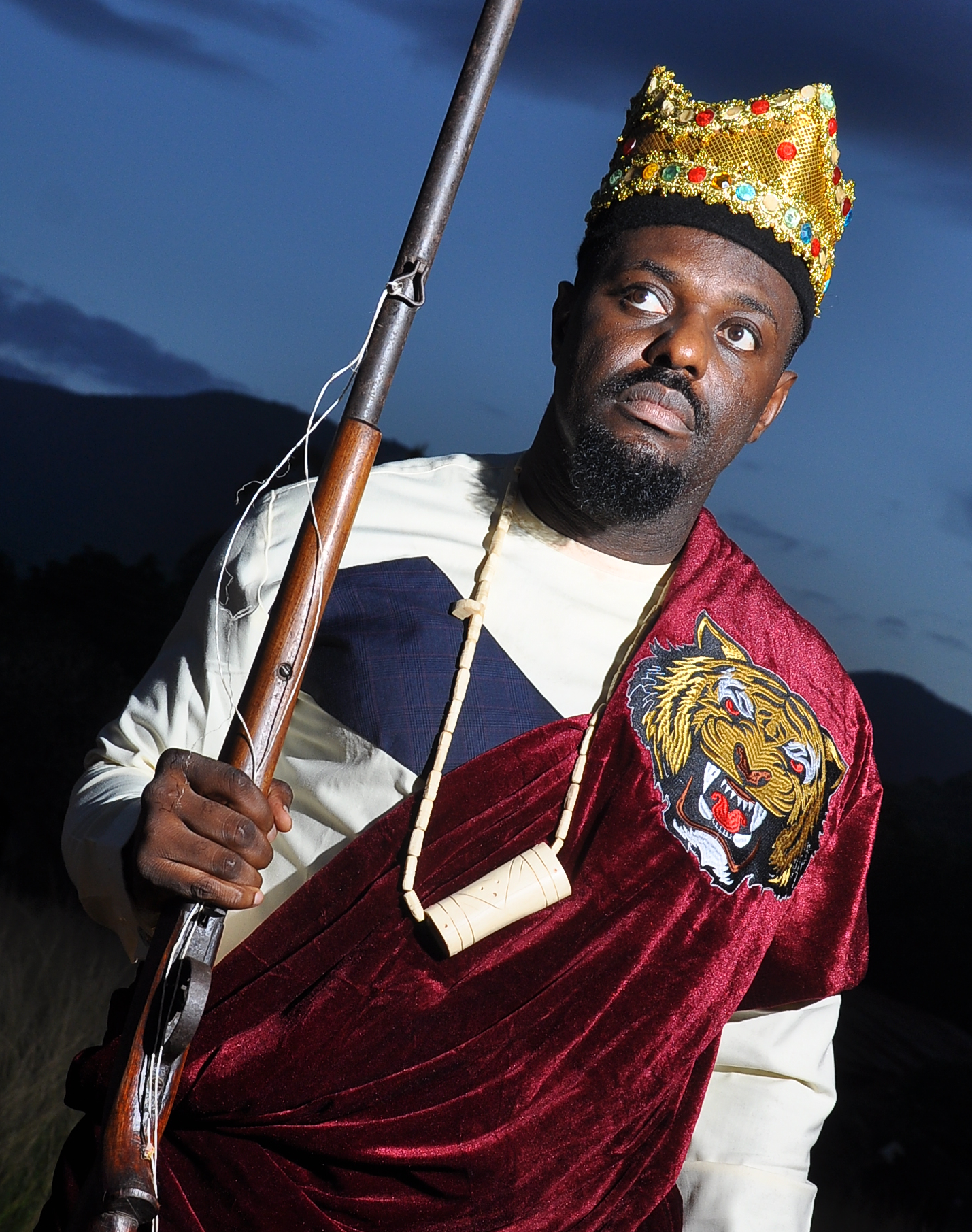
- Jim Iyke on the set of Omambala
- Born: James Ikechukwu Okolue; 25 September 1976 (age 50); Libreville, Gabon
- Other names: James Ikechukwu Esomugha; James Ikechukwu Okolue
- Education: Bsc. Philosophy, University of Jos.
- Alma mater: University of Jos
- Occupation: Actor
- Years active: 1998–present
- Awards: Net Honors, 2021
- Website: jimiykesworld.com

James Ikechukwu Esomugha// , popularly known as Jim Iyke (born 25 September 1976), is a Nigerian actor and one of the stars of the movie Last Flight to Abuja.

== Early life and education ==
He was born in Libreville, Gabon. His parents, from Ogwugwu Village in Enugwu-Agidi town of Anambra State, changed their name from Okolue to Esomugha. He is the only boy in a family of eight children. He attended secondary school in F. G. C. Kwali Abuja from 1985 to 1991, then earned a diploma in Banking and Finance and a BSc in philosophy from the University of Jos, Plateau State.

== Career ==
Jim Iyke began acting in 1998. As of October 2013, he was one of the highest paid actors in Nollywood, he has appeared in over 150 films.

He started a movie production company, Untamed Productions in 2007, and also has his own music record label, Untamed Records. His first album, titled Who Am I?, featured some of Nigeria's top musicians, such as TuFace Idibia and Sound Sultan.

== Controversy ==
A video of Jim Iyke's purported 'deliverance' from an evil spirit at The Synagogue Church of All Nations, led by Pastor T.B. Joshua, provoked intense debate on social media. The spirit reportedly confessed that it was behind Iyke's inability to find a wife.

== Personal life ==
In April 2019, he announced the birth of his son.

== Filmography ==
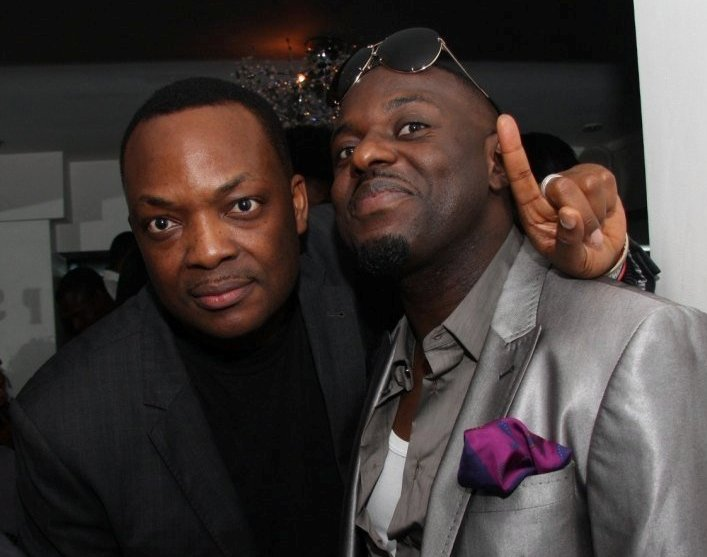
DJ Abass and Jim Iyke

Year	Title	Role	Director	Ref
2000	Vuga	Captured Villager (Uncredited)	Simi Opeodu	
2006	The High Class	Prince's Orderly	Afam Okereke	
2007	A Better Place	Festus	Tchidi Chikere	
2008	The Generals	Ted		
2008	The Shepherd	Raymond	Nonso Ekene Okonkwo	
2009	Royal Madness	Ikoku	Nonso Ekene Okonkwo	
2010	Between Kings and Queens	Nnanna	Joy Dickson	
2012	Last Flight to Abuja	David	Obi Emelonye	
2013	And Then There Was You	Zuma	Leila Djansi	
2014	When Love Comes Around	—N/a	Afe Olumowe	
2016	Stalker	Michael	Moses Inwang	
2016	A Star in Heaven	Kayode	Afe Olumowe	
2017	American Driver	Jim Iyke	Moses Inwang	
2018	Merry Men: The Real Yoruba Demons	Naz	Toka McBaror	
2019	Dead Rite	N/A	Tope Alake	
2019	The Set-Up	Edem	Niyi Akinmolaya	
2019	Merry Men 2: Another Mission	Naz	Moses Inwang	
2020	Cold Feet	Mayowa	Moses Inwang	
	Bad Comments	Frank Orji	Moses Inwang	
2021	Hustle	Tunde Lewis	Marc Adebesin	
2022	The Set Up 2	Edem	Chinaza Onuzo	
	Closure Mandate	David	Robert Peters	
	Zongo Boys		Benjamin Sarpong	
	Passport	Oscar	Dimeji Ajibola	
2023	Different Strokes	Alex Cole	Biodun Stephen	
	Rent a Room	Obi	Jim Iyke	
2024	No Fury		Akay Mason	

== Awards and nominations ==
Year	Award	Category	Result	Ref
2021	Net Honours	Most Searched Actor	Won	
