= List of Nigerian comedians =

This is a list of notable Nigerian comedians.

== A ==
- Asiricomedy (born 1991)
- Abiodun Ayoyinka (born 1960)
- Akpororo
- Alibaba Akporobome (born 1965)
- Ayo Makun (born 1971)

== B ==
- Basketmouth (born 1978)
- Bovi (born 1979)
- Broda Shaggi (born 1993)
- Buchi (born 1979)

== C ==
- Chigul (born 1976)
- Chuks D General

== D ==
- Demgohearword
- dfw..chocolate (born 2002)

== E ==
- Emmanuella (born 2010)
- Egungun of Lagos

== F ==
- Frank D Don (born 1985)

== G ==
- Gbenga Adeyinka (born 1968)

== H ==
- Helen Paul (born 1983)

== I ==
- I Go Dye
- I Go Save (born 1979)

== J ==
- Jidex (born 2000)

== K ==
- Klint da Drunk
- Kiriku

== L ==
- Lord Lamba

== M ==
- Mark Angel (born 1991)
- MC Aproko
- MC Lively (born 1992)
- Mr Macaroni (born 1993)

== O ==
- Okey Bakassi (born 1969)
- Officer Woos (born 1996)

== P ==
- Peller (comedian) (Born 2005)
- Prince Hezekiah (Born 1980)

== R ==
- Real Warri Pikin (born 1990)

== S ==
- SamSpedy (born 1995)
- SLK (Comedian)

== T ==
- Taaooma (born 1999)
- Twyse Ereme (born 1992)
