= Frank D Don =

Nigerian comedian and actor (born 1985)

Otoide Frank Isimhmen Chineyene
- Born: 16 November 1985; Asaba, Delta State, Nigeria
- Other name: Frank D Don
- Spouse: Mary Otoide
- Children: 4

Comedy career
- Years active: 2009-present
- Website: www.frankddon.com

Otoide Frank Isimhmen Chineyene (born 16 November 1985), known by his stage name Rt Hon Frank D Don, is a Nigerian entertainer, comedian and actor. He currently is the Senior special Assistant to the Governor of Delta State on Entertainment.

== Early life and education ==
Frank D Don was born in Asaba, Delta State, south-south Nigeria in 1985. He attended St Peters Cat. Nursery and Primary School Asaba and Finished his O' level in ICE (Institute of Continuous Education) Asaba, where later furthered his education to Ogwashu-uku Polytechnic, where he studied Mass communication.

== Comedy career ==
Frank D Don's comedy career started from stage acting where he first performed Comedy at Unity Theater Production. He later gained a special appearance on Star Trek Show and worked alongside other Comedians and Musicians such as Kcee, Psqaure, Faze, Tony one week and late Aba Ghana as the MC. Frank D Don performed comedy at the Nite of a 1000 laughs show 2009 organized by Opa Williams. Other shows he performed in were, Glo laffter Feast, Mnet Comedy Club in Urganda and Warri Again where he worked alongside his associates Such as Igosave, Basketmouth, Bovi, Igodye Buchi, Alibaba and many others. His annual 10Years On Stage Comedy and Musical Show was held in Delta State. On 6 September 2014, Rt. Hon. Frank D Don wed his beautiful queen. Comedian Frank D Don Declared his Political Intention.

== Awards ==
- Best Comedian of the Year 13 August 2009
- 1st ever delta State Icons (Most Outstanding Comedian of the Year) 2010
- Niger Delta Award 2011 (For his Contribution to the comedy industry 2011
- South-East Comedy Award (As Most Creative Comedian) 2011
- Golden Groove Independence Merit Awards (for his Contribution to the Entertainment industry 2011)
- NYSC Merit Awards (as Most Creative Comedian in Asaba) 2012
- National Association of Psychology Students) NAPS As Outstanding performance in MC and Comedy 2012
- South-East Entertainment Award (as the most creative comedian in the South-East 2013
- National Youths Council of Nigeria / Distinguished Delta Youth Merit Award (Most Outstanding Comedian 2013)
- Peace legend Award (Fast Rising Comedian of the Year 2013)
- Delta Role Model Award (Comedian of the year 2013)
- Dspg & Beyond Ambassadorial Award (As the Most Outstanding Comedian of the Year 2014) by NADSS
- Delta Entertainment Awards (As fast rising comedian of the year 2014)

== See also ==
- List of Igbo people
- List of Nigerian comedians
