= Brain Jotter =

Nigerian comedian (born 1996)

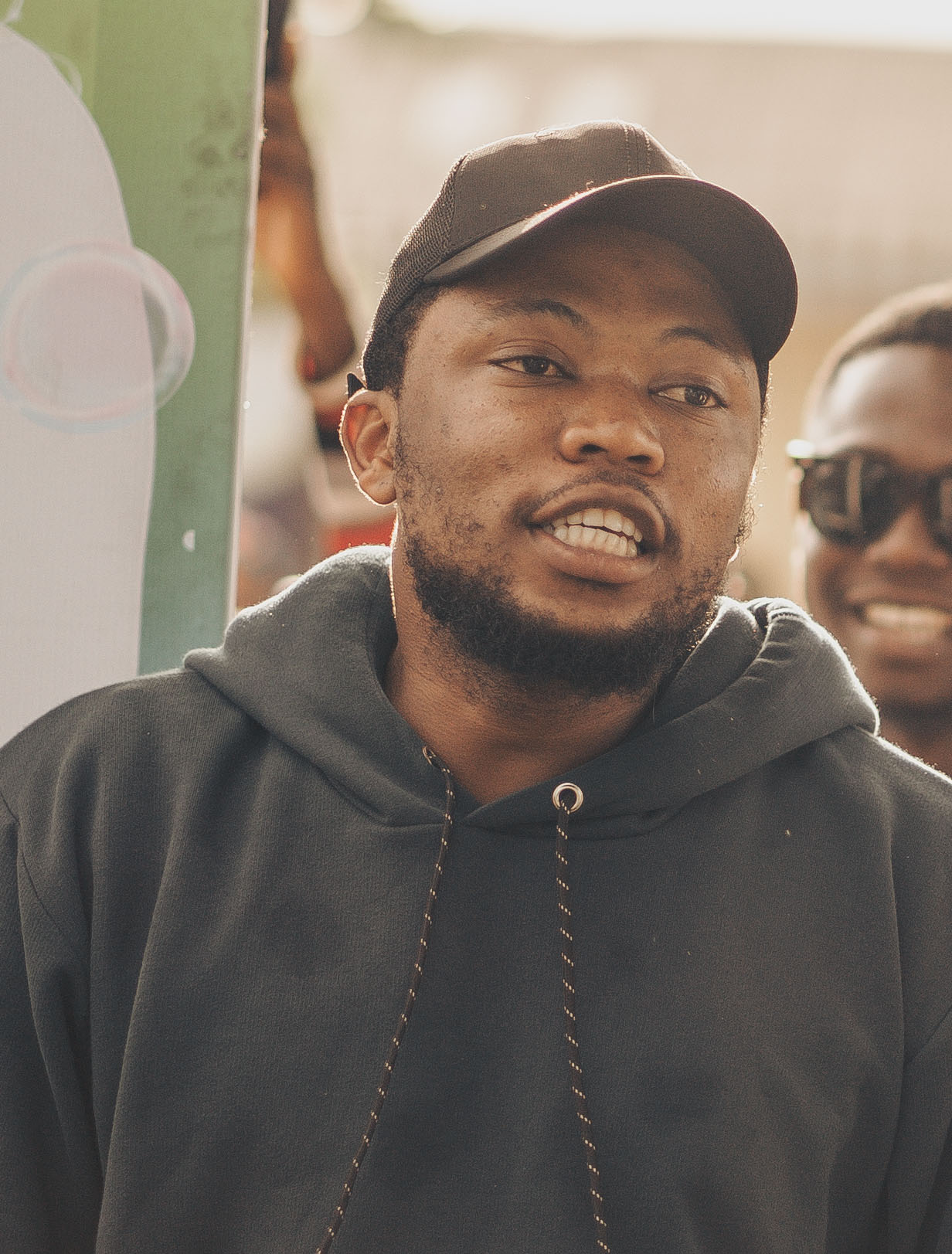
- Brain Jotter in 2023
- Born: Chukwuebuka Emmanuel Amuzie; 5 February 1996 (age 30); Orile Iganmu, Lagos State, Nigeria
- Education: University of Lagos

Comedy career
- Years active: 2020–present
- Medium: Stand-up; film; television; Content creator; YouTuber
- Genres: Observational comedy; Insult comedy; Satire; Short comedy

YouTube information
- Channel: Brain Jotter
- Years active: 2020–present
- Genres: Stand-up; film; television; content creator; comedy
- Subscribers: 2.2 million
- Views: 383 million
- Last updated: 14 August 2026

Chukwuebuka Emmanuel Amuzie (born 5 February 1996), known professionally as Brain Jotter, is a Nigerian comedian, content creator, social media influencer and philanthropist.

== Early life and education ==
Chukwuebuka Emmanuel Amuzie was born on 5 February 1996, in Orile Iganmu, Lagos State, Nigeria. He hails from Imo State. Raised in Lagos, he completed his primary and secondary education there. Amuzie later pursued a degree in Business Administration at the University of Lagos and graduated in 2024.

== Career ==
Brain Jotter's career in comedy began during his secondary school years, where he performed as a stand-up comedian at various live comedy shows. His early performances included appearances at events such as "The Unleashed" and "Pencil Unbroken" in Abuja. His wider recognition came in 2020 when he began posting short comedic videos on Instagram.

Some of his skits have featured other Nigerian comedians, including Mr Funny, Nons Miraj, Don Jazzy and Bovi. He is the brand ambassador for The Shawn Exchange, a company that deals in digital assets and cryptocurrency.

He initiated the "Gwo Gwo Gwo Ngwo" dance challenge, which gained traction on social media platforms. The challenge drew renewed attention to the song "Ka Esi Le Onye Isi Oche" by Mike Ejeagha. In May 2024, he organised a stand-up comedy show titled "Outside the Box" in Abuja.

In November 2024, he appeared in a stage play at the Ghana National Theatre titled "U Play Me, I Play U", written by Efo Kodjo Mawugbe.

He has also appeared in several productions including Basketmouth's series Papa Benji.

== Philanthropy ==
Brain Jotter has been recognised for his philanthropic efforts. In 2023, he raised awareness for a fan in need of surgery, leading to a public donation campaign that funded her medical treatment.

During his Outside the Box show in Abuja, audience members collectively donated over 20 million Naira for a physically challenged woman in attendance.

Following the viral success of the "Gwo Gwo Gwo Ngwo" challenge, Brain Jotter visited highlife musician Mike Ejeagha and presented him with a gift of 2 million Naira.

In 2025, he launched Share the Grace, a web-based platform where individuals could apply for financial support in areas such as health, education, and business.
