= Papa Benji =

2020 Web Series by Basketmouth

- Genre: Comedy
- Created by: Basketmouth
- Written by: Basketmouth
- Directed by: Patrick Nkamiang
- Starring: Buchi; Nedu; Basketmouth; Senator (comedian); Maleke; Og Tega; Broda Shaggi; Sound Sultan
- Country of origin: Nigeria
- Original languages: English; Pidgin
- No. of seasons: 2
- No. of episodes: 26

Production
- Executive producer: Basketmouth
- Producer: Solomon Adekunle
- Production locations: Lagos, Nigeria.
- Editors: Solomon Adekunle; Bob Rufos
- Running time: 20–40 minutes

Original release
- Release: December 12, 2020

Papa Benji is a comedy web series that follows the life of its eponymous character, Papa Benji, a pepper soup joint owner and everyone surrounding him.

== Plot ==
Papa Benji is a story about the Egwuonwu family, their pepper soup joint and their son Benjamin. Peter Egwuonwu owns one of the best pepper soup joints in the 60s and no one knows his recipes except for his son, Benjamin.

Benjamin has dreams to become a banker and invest in his father's pepper soup business but his dreams were cut short after his parents died in an accident. His uncle ran the business down, and Benjamin was left unable to further his education. Benjamin became the head of security at a bank after growing up. At his 45th birthday celebration, he prepared pepper soup using his late father's recipes. His colleagues were blown away, asking for more, including the bank manager. After receiving a loan from the bank, Benjamin started his own pepper soup business.

Mama Benji, Papa Benji's wife, is a failed fashion designer who owns a shop next to their home. She spends her time gossiping with friends. She also fasts and prays excessively, because she is ver religious.

Their son Benjamin Jr. is a Marlian who loves music. He is an up-and-coming musician who is an amateur at singing.

Mr Jiminus, Papa Solo, and Mr Pius are pensioners that are regular customers at Papa Benji's pepper soup joint. Of the two, Mr Pius supports whoever buys him a drink.

Papa Benji tells the story of an Igbo man, his family, customers, and environment.

== Cast ==
- Senator (comedian) as Benjamin Engwuowun/Papa Benji
- Ekwitosi as Mrs Engwuowun/Mama Benji
- OG Tega as Benjamin Jr.
- Basketmouth as Mr Jiminus
- Buchi as Papa Solo
- Nedu as Mr Pius
- Sound Sultan as Prof Alloy
- Broda Shaggi as K Money
- Maleke as Sean Witherman
- Mr Paul as Noble
- Real Warri Pikin as Philomena
- Jemima Osunde as Jenifer
- Brain Jotter as Collins
- Romeo WJ as Chinny
- MC Forever as Pastor Godspower
- Sylvia Adora as Ada
- Oluwatobi Delalu as Kemi
- Eme-Uche Chidera as Professor Rufus
- Uche Obunse as Ella

== Release ==
On the 19th of November 2020, Basketmouth released the official Soundtrack album of the web series titled Yabasi. He also posted the 6 minutes introductory episode as trailer on October 1, 2020, via his YouTube channel.

The show was supposed to air its first episode on 30 October 2020 but was later aired on 12 December 2020.

== See also ==
- List of web television series
- Basketmouth
- Yabasi
