= Buchi (comedian) =

Nigerian comedian

Onyebuchi Ojieh
- Born: 4 April 1979; Delta State, Nigeria
- Other name: Buchi
- Spouse: Rukkiyah Isede (m.2017;div.2024)
- Children: 2

Comedy career
- Years active: 2008-present
- Medium: Stand-up; television
- Genres: Observational comedy; Insult Comedy; Satire
- Subjects: Nigeria Culture; everyday life; Popular culture; current events; Nigeria politics; Nigeria Poverty
- Website: www.buchi.tv

Onyebuchi Ojieh (born 4 April 1979), known professionally as Buchi//, is a Nigerian comedian, composer, writer, and actor from Delta State, Nigeria.

== Early life and education ==
Buchi was born in Kwale, Ndokwa West, Delta State. He attended DSC Nursery and Primary School and Ovwian Secondary School in Ovwian, Warri. He later attended Bendel State University (now Ambrose Alli University), where he studied law.

== Comedy career ==
Buchi began his comedy career in 2008, after being introduced to comedian Tee A, who invited him to perform at Tee-A Live N Naked in Lagos. This led to meetings with other comedians, including Ali Baba and Opa Williams, who gave him a spot on his Nite of a 1000 Laughs. Buchi has performed alongside comedians such as I Go Dye, I Go Save, Basketmouth, and Bovi.

== Awards ==
Standup Comedian	Comedy of the Year
Youth Award	Comedy of the Year

== See also ==
- List of Igbo people
- List of Nigerian comedians
