= SLK (comedian) =

Nigerian comedian and actor (born 1991)

- Born: Oluwaponmile Salako
- Notable work: Teetotaler

Comedy career
- Years active: 2009–present
- Medium: Stand-up; film; television; Content Creator
- Genre: Comedy

Oluwaponmile Salako, better known by the stage name SLK, is a Nigerian stand-up comedian, actor and compere. He started comedy professionally in December 2009 and is also known for the character "Boda Wasiu". In May 2023, he debuted his comedy titled "Teetotaler" on Netflix.

== Career ==
In 2016, Salako introduced the skit-character "Boda Wasiu", where he calls out famous people while addressing social issues.

His first standup comedy special "Thank God I'm Funny (TGIF)" was a live show which was held on 23 November 2018. The live show featured guest appearances from comedians Bovi, Alibaba Akpobome and Basketmouth. It premiered in cinemas on 26 July 2019. In the same year, his film "Change: The Legend of the Street" was included in Moët & Chandon's "Shorties" collection of short films by new filmmakers.

In April 2023, he announced the debut of his second comedy special "Teetotaler" on Netflix. The comedy addressed socio-cultural issues in Africa like rape, politics and monarchy.

He has featured in several movies including "It's Her Day", "Becoming Abi" and "Daluchi".

== Filmography ==
- Onibukun (2001)
- It's Her Day (2016)
- The Other News (2017)
- A Case of Freewill (2017)
- Another Father's Day (2019)
- During Ever After (2020)
- Becoming Abi (2021)
- Daluchi (2021)
- Come With Me (2022)

== Awards/nominations ==
Year	Award	Category	Result	Ref
2017	The Future Awards Africa	Comedian of the year	Nominated	
2015	Naija FM Comedy Awards	Upcoming comedian of the year	Nominated	
