= Maleke =

Nigerian comedian and Musician (born 1978)

Maleke Moye Idowu
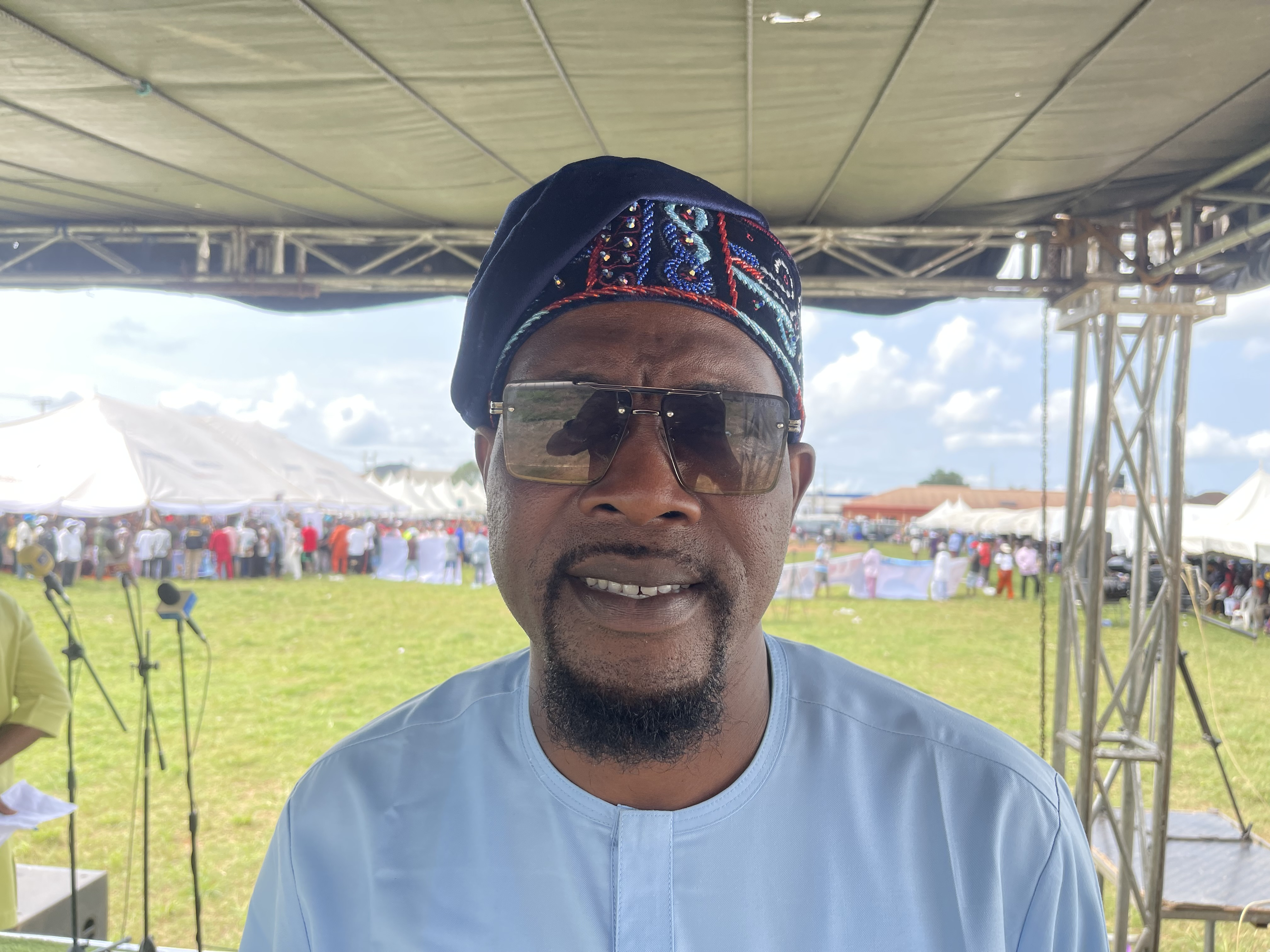
- Born: Maleke Moye Idowu; 14 February 1978 (age 48); Benin City, Edo State, Nigeria
- Education: Oguola School [primary], EdoKpolor Grammar School, Edo State [secondary]
- Alma mater: Auchi Polytechnic, Edo State
- Occupations: Comedian, musician
- Years active: Since 2007
- Notable work: "Mini Mini Wana Wana" [music], Executive Director to Edo State Governor on Entertainment

Maleke Moye Idowu (born 14 February 1979) is a Nigerian comedian and musician.

In 2017, he served as the Executive Director to Edo State Governor on Entertainment and the PMAN (Performing Musician Employers Association of Nigeria) chairman Edo State Chapter.

== Early life and education ==
Maleke Moye Idowu was born in Benin City, where he attended Oguola primary school. He attended secondary school at EdoKpolor Grammar school, and proceeded to Auchi Polytechnic, where he studied business administration.

== Comedy ==
Maleke first performed comedy at the Nite of 1,000 Laughs show, organized by Opa Williams. During that show, he worked alongside other comedians, including I Go Dye, Basketmouth, Ali Baba, Igosave, Gandoki, Okey Bakassi, Julius Agwu, Mike Ogbolosinger.

== Music ==
Maleke has recorded numerous songs. His debut album, Small Small, with seven tracks on it was released in 2007.

Maleke was better known from his music comedy with his hit track, "Mini Mini Wana Wana", which was released in 2007. "Mini Mini Wana Wana' was a trend of those days.

In early 2015, Maleke released a single, "Cheeta Dance"

=== Discography ===
==== Wanted ====
Miniminiwanawana (2010)
# Situation
# Ewole
# By Two
# Atarodo
# Salamaleku
# Kolobi
# 911

==== Other singles ====
- "Pick It Up'
- "Nahio" ft Jaywon
- "Function" ft 2Baba
- "Pay U"
- "Erujeje" ft Oritse femi
- "No Bother (2011)
- "Wedding Day"
- "Over f. Harrysong"
- "Cheeta Dance"

== Awards ==
- EAAN AWARDS 2013
- Special Recognition Award 2013
- Award of Excellence 2014
- South South Music Award 2013
- Nigeria Fashion Recognition 2014
- Ehiglad Entertainment Award 2013
- Niger Delta Universities Award 2013
- EEMA Awards 2013
- List of comedians
- List of musicians
- List of Nigerians
