= Freeme Music =

Nigerian record label

- Type: Private
- Industry: Music, entertainment
- Genre: Various
- Founded: 22 August 2020; 6 years ago
- Founder: Michael Ugwu
- Headquarters: Lekki, Lagos, Nigeria
- Area served: Worldwide
- Parent: Freeme Digital
- Website: www.freememusic.com

Freeme Music is a Nigerian record label founded by Michael Ugwu on 22 August 2020. The label is a premium label services arm of Freeme Digital, a distribution company founded in 2013 by Michael Ugwu and headquartered in Lagos. The label is home to recording artists such as Ninety, Pawzz, and is affiliated with The Cavemen and Basket Mouth.

== History ==
On August 4, 2020, Freeme Music announced the official signing of The Cavemen to a License Partnership Deal as part of the company's commitment to partner and support the most promising indigenous talents.

In an interview with Music Business Worldwide, Michael Ugwu revealed plans for new artists and global future stars in Africa, “As the pace around the world picks up for African music, Freeme Music and Freeme+ will be at the forefront of finding new artists and future global stars from the continent and bringing them to worldwide recognition and success.”

Before its official launch in 2021, Freeme Music had partnered with The Cavemen and Basket Mouth for the release and rollout of their debut albums; Roots and Yabasi in August 2020 and November 2020 respectively.

In 2021, Ninety joined Freme Music as the first recording artist having signed a 360 deal with the label.

Majesty Lyn joined the label in 2022 in a licensing deal for her extended play Things on Things.

In 2023, Pawzz became the second artist to join Freeme Music on a 360 deal.

== Artists ==
=== Current acts ===
| Act | Year signed | Releases under the label |
|---|---|---|
| Ninety | 2021 | 1 |
| Pawzz | 2023 | 1 |

=== Former acts ===
| Act | Year signed | Year left | Releases under the label |
|---|---|---|---|
| The Cavemen | 2020 | 2021 | 1 |
| Basket Mouth | 2020 | 2021 | 1 |
| Majesty Lyn | 2021 | 2022 | 1 |

== Discography ==
=== Albums ===
| Artist | Album | Details |
|---|---|---|
| The Cavemen | Roots | Released: 28 August 2020; Chart Position: —; Certification: — |
| Basketmouth | Yabasi | Released: 20 November 2020; Chart Position: —; Certification: — |
| Ninety | Rare Gem | Released: 28 August 2022; Chart Position: —; Certification: — |
| Majesty Lyn | Things on Things | Released: 23 September 2022; Chart Position: —; Certification: — |
| Pawzz | Prezz Play | Released: 20 January 2023; Chart Position: —; Certification: — |

=== Singles ===
`List of singles released by artists signed to Freeme Music
| Artist | Title | Year | Album | Release date |
|---|---|---|---|---|
| Basket Mouth | "Myself" | 2020 | Yabasi | 1 January 2020 |
| Basket Mouth | "Papa Benji" | 2020 | Yabasi | 1 January 2020 |
| Ninety | "Touch & Follow" | 2021 | N/A | 19 May 2021 |
| Ninety | "Somebody" | 2021 | N/A | 6 August 2021 |
| Ninety | "Piano" | 2021 | N/A | 29 October 2021 |
| Ninety | "Diamonds" | 2022 | Rare Gem | 14 April 2022 |
| Ninety | "Smoke and Chill" | 2022 | N/A | 13 October 2022 |
| Pawzz | "Koma" | 2023 | Prezz Play | 20 January 2023 |
