= Yabasi (soundtrack) =

Soundtrack album by Basketmouth
- Released: November 19, 2020
- Genre: Afrobeats; Highlife
- Length: 30:00
- Language: English Pidgin Igbo
- Label: Freeme Music
- Producer: Bright Okpocha

Yabasi is the official Soundtrack album of the web-series "Papa Benji" by Basketmouth. It was released on 19 November 2020 under Nigerian indigenous record label Freeme Music.

== Background ==
The 10-track album has a running time of 30 minutes and features Duncan Mighty, Umu Obiligbo, Ice Prince, Oxlade, Show Dem Camp, Waje, Ladipoe, Flash, BOJ, Chike, Zoro, Play, Umu Obiligbo, Ceeza Milli, Flavour, Phyno, The Cavemen, Bez, Dice Ailes, Peruzzi and Ill Bliss.

The 10 tracks were produced by Duktor Sett, and was Mixed & Mastered by Tee Y Mix.

== Singles ==
Basketmouth released “My self” featuring Oxlade and Show Dem Camp, and “Papa Benji” featuring Phyno and Flavor as singles in October 2020.

== Reception ==
While reviewing the album, "Music worm city" noted that It is a great album all round and It shows that hardwork and time were put into it, adding that "just when the year is coming to an end and we felt we have had all heat albums that can come out of this year, we have Basketmouth surprise us with this."

Omoniyi Faith of "The muse Africa" posits that the album would remain thematically relevant for a longtime and probably end up becoming a classic, noting that every track was enjoyable almost without fail.

Motolani Alake of Pulse Ng rated the album 8.0/10 adding that Basketmouth's selection of features is largely impressive.

== Track listing ==
No.	Title	Length
1.	"Pepper Soup" (Featuring Duncan Mighty and Ice Prince)	2:38
2.	"MySelf" (Featuring Oxlade and Show Dem Camp)	3:24
3.	"Ride Or Die" (Featuring Waje and Ladipoe)	3:06
4.	"World People" (Featuring Flash and BOJ)	3:08
5.	"Life" (Featuring Chike, Zoro and Play)	3:21
6.	"One Bo" (Featuring Umu Obiligbo)	2:20
7.	"December" (Featuring Ceeza Milli)	2:29
8.	"Papa Benji" (Featuring Flavour and Phyno)	3:15
9.	"Hustle" (Featuring The Cave Men, BEZ and Dice Ailes)	3:49
10.	"Udo" (Featuring Peruzzi and Ill Bliss)	2:51
Total length:		30:00

== See also ==
- Basketmouth
- List of 2020 albums
- Flavor
