= Damilare =

- Pronunciation: Damilare
- Gender: Male
- Language: Yoruba

Origin
- Origin: Nigerian
- Meaning: Justify me

Other names
- Short form: Dare

Damilare or Oluwadamilare is a Nigerian given name of Yoruba origin, meaning "justify me." Notable people with the given name include:

- Sunday Adetunji, Nigerian footballer
- Asiricomedy, Nigerian comedian
- Dare Olatunji, Nigerian footballer
- Qdot, Nigerian musician
