= Paper Chaze =

- Born: Onafowope Olumide Korede; May 30, 2000; Ijebu Ode, Ogun State, Nigeria
- Education: University of Lagos
- Occupations: Content creator; Comedian; Streamer; Actor; Event host; Entrepreneur
- Years active: 2024–present

Onafowope Olumide Korede (born 30 May 2000), known professionally as Paper Chaze, is a Nigerian content creator, comedian, and livestreamer. He is known for his comedy videos.

== Early life and education ==
Onafowope Olumide Korede was born on 30 May 2000 and is from Ijebu Ode, Ogun State, Nigeria. After completing his West African Senior School Certificate Examination (WASSCE), He worked at a filling station for about a year before resuming his education. Korede then gained admission to the University of Lagos, where he studied psychology.

== Career ==
Paper chaze started experimenting with online video production around 2021. But began his professional career as a comedian in 2024, After meeting content creator Gilmore. In 2024 he created and popularize several Internet slang and catchphrases in Nigeria, including Stay Chezed Up and Zero Gbezome.

Paper chaze went viral on TikTok with the skit/short film African Parents. On July 22 2026 he was featured on YNaija Top 10 Content Across Nigeria.

Some of his skits have featured other Nigerian entertainers, including Nons Miraj, Don Jazzy and Bovi. In February 2026, he launched his real estate business, Stay Chessed Realty.

== See also ==
- List of Nigerian Comedians
