= Chioma Okafor =

Chioma Okafor may refer to:

- Chioma Okafor (actress) (born 1994), Nigerian actress and model
- Chioma Okafor (footballer) (born 2003), Nigerian footballer
