= Lord Lamba =

Nigerian comedian (born 1995)

- Born: Promise Kelvin Anagbogu; 4 May 1995 (age 31); Amuwo-Odofin Lagos, Nigeria
- Children: 1

Comedy career
- Years active: 2017–present
- Medium: film; television; Content Creator
- Genres: Observational comedy; Insult comedy; Satire; Sketch Comedy
- Subjects: Nigerian Culture; Everyday life; Popular culture; Current events; Trick Comedy

YouTube information
- Channel: LordLamba
- Years active: 2018–present
- Genre: Movies
- Subscribers: 367 Thousands
- Views: 38.7million
- Last updated: 14 May 2026

Promise Kelvin Anagbogu (born 4 May 1995), professionally known as Lord Lamba or Lord of Lies, is a Nigerian comedian and skit maker.

== Early life ==
Promise Kelvin Anagbogu was born on 4 May 1995 in Amuwo Odofin, Lagos State but originally hails from Anambra State, southeast Nigeria.

== Career ==
Kelvin's career as a comedian started in 2019. As a child, he dreamt of becoming a professional footballer, but his mother made him see the possibility of venturing into comedy because of his ability to make people laugh.

He first started comedy by posting short skits on social media platforms like Instagram and Facebook. In 2020, he officially debuted his first comedy video which earned him the nickname "Lord of Lies".

In 2021, he won the DENSA Award as Social Media Comedian of the Year after being nominated alongside Broda Shaggi, Mr. Sabinus and Taaooma. That same year, he won the Nigeria Choice Awards as the Best Content Creator of The Year.

== Awards and nominations ==
Year	Award	Category	Result	Ref
2023	The Skit Makers Award	Best Male	Nominated	
2021	DENSA	Social Comedian of The Year	Won	
2021	Nigeria Choice Awards	Best Content Creator	Won	

== See also ==
- List of Nigerian Comedians
