= Dead Serious =

Dead Serious may refer to:

- Dead Serious (album), an album by Das EFX
- Dead Serious (EP), an EP by Hullabaloo
- Dead Serious (film), a 2024 Nigerian romantic comedy film
