= Oghenevwede =

Given name

Oghenevwede is a unisex given name that is most common among Urhobo people in Delta state Nigeria. The name Oghenevwede means "God owns the day".

== Notable individuals with the name ==
- Egungun of Lagos called Kuye Oghenevwede Adegoke (born 5 March 1995) professionally known as Egungun of Lagos or just Egungun, is a Nigerian Internet personality.
