= Real Warri Pikin =

Nigerian comedian

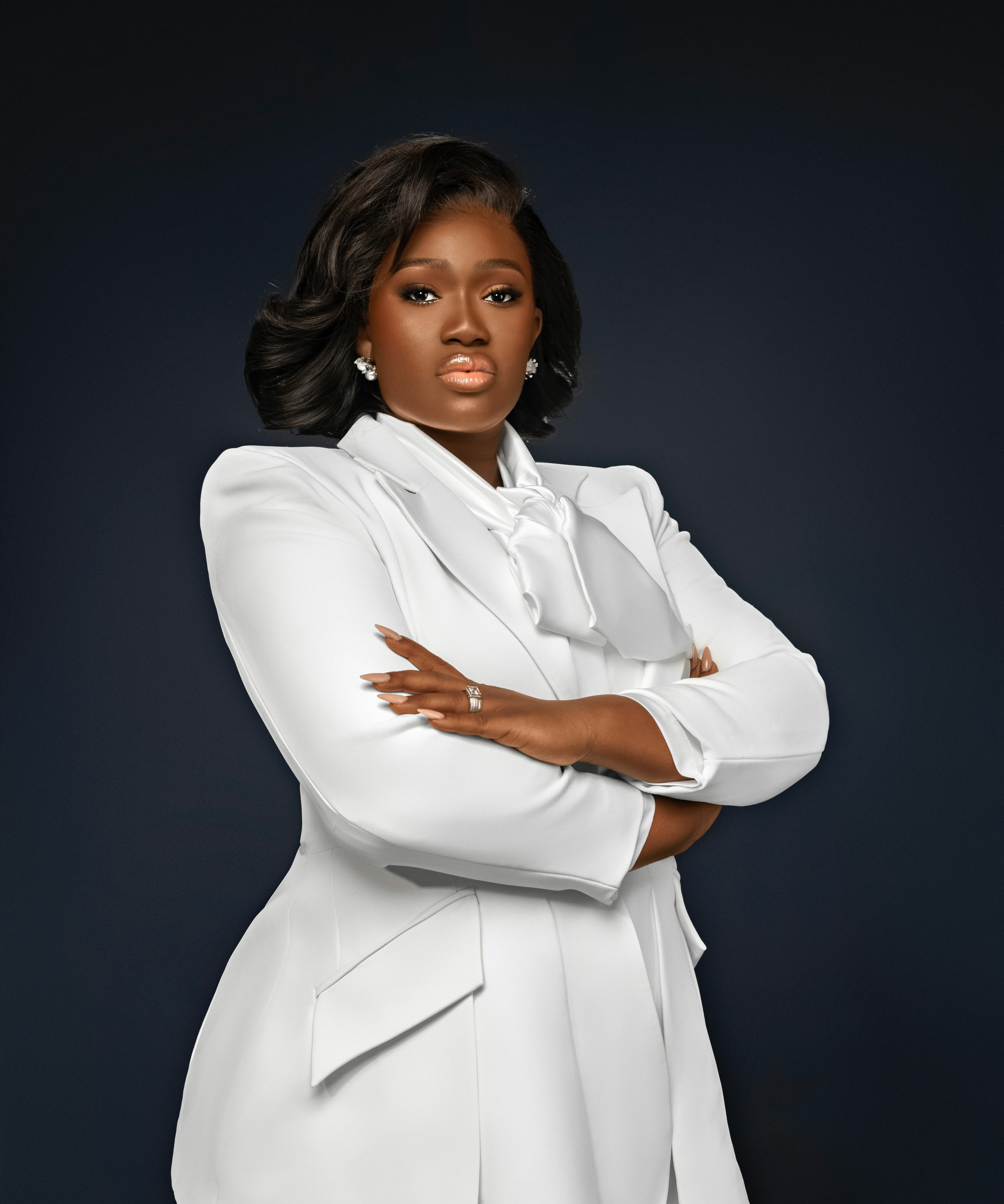
- Real warri Pikin
- Born: Anita Alaire Afoke Asuoha
- Education: Benson Idahosa University
- Occupations: comedian; actress; Actor; Filmmaker; dancer; MC
- Years active: 2008–present
- Known for: Stand-up comedy, skits, humanitarian
- Notable work: (School of Thought, Real Warri pikin Unfiltered, Real Warri pikin one million challenge)
- Spouse: Victor Ikechukwu Asuoha (m. 2013)
- Children: 3
- Website: https://realwarripikin.com

Anita Alaire Afoke Asuoha is a Nigerian stand-up comedian, actor and social media host known by her stage name Real Warri Pikin. She was born on October 29, 1990 in Warri, Delta State.

== Personal life ==
Anita Asuoha was brought up in Warri, Delta State of Nigeria. Her father is an Ijaw from Burutu Local Government Area of Delta State, while her mother is an Urhobo. She is the third of six children. She studied Political Science/Public Administration at the Benson Idahosa University in Benin City and graduated in 2012. She married Victor Ikechukwu Asuoha in 2013 and they have three children.

Real Warri Pikin runs a non-governmental organization called Real Warri Pikin Foundation that grants opportunity for women with mental health struggles.

== Career ==
In 2008, she was a contestant in the ‘Glo Rock ‘N’ Rule dance competition’ and won the first position. She was named a Globacom ambassador in 2009. In 2011, she auditioned in ‘The Maltina Dance All Family competition’ and finished as second overall best with her family. She has performed as a comedian at many events in Nigeria including Warri Again, Akpororo vs Akpororo, Man on Fire, and the AY show. She also performs as a compere in many events across the country. Anita Asuoha's stage name is ‘Real Warri Pikin’. She is an on-air-personality with a show titled "Real Talk With Real Warri Pikin" on Max 90.9 FM radio station Abuja.

She hosted the biggest comedy show in Warri on 1 August 2021, titled REAL WARRI PIKIN UNFILTERED. The show has been held in Abuja, Warri, Ghana, Milton Keynes, Manchester and London She has performed in Ghana, Senegal, the United States, and Nigeria. She has also performed at Warri Again?, AY LIVE, Bovi’s ‘Man on Fire’ etc. Real Warri Pikin hosts a comedy show.

Real Warri Pikin has also featured in Nollywood films like Prophetess, Fate of Alakada, Aki and Pawpaw, The Ghost and the Tout Too, The Stand Up, Intricate, Lemonade, and Merry Men 2. In January 2021, she dropped her series School of Thought and released its music single "School Of Thought" featuring Teni. In October 2021, she launched her clothing line ‘Real Warri Pikin Merch’. In August, 2025, Anita Asuoha took her acclaimed school the ‘Apologetically Me’ to international stage with a sold-out performance in the United States.

== Filmography ==
- Fate of Alakada (2020)
- Papa Benji

== Recognition and awards ==
- The Humor Awards for Most creative comedy show 2022
- The Humor Awards for stand-up comedian of the year 2022
- African Choice Award Comedy Act Of The Year 2022

== See also ==
- List of Nigerian comedians
