= Calabar Chic =

Nigerian actress

- Born: Stephanie Faith Isuma; 10 June 1991 (age 35); Kano State, Nigeria
- Education: Nnamdi Azikiwe University
- Occupation: Actress
- Years active: 2015–present

Stephanie Faith Isuma (born June 10, 1991) popularly known as Calabar Chic, is a Nigerian actress and content creator. She is from Yala, Cross River State, Calabar Chic started creating comic videos on social media using Ibibio-Efik accents.

== Early life and education ==
Calabar Chic was born in Kano State, Nigeria as the second out of six children. She further had her BSc in Mass communication from the Nnamdi Azikiwe University, and a degree in film editing from the Delyork Creative Academy Film School in Lagos State.

== Career ==
Calabar Chic gained mainstream attention after her 15-second first ever video which she posted on her Instagram went viral in 2016. She started acting before creating comedy contents. She has been featured in several Nollywood films including Finding Me (2025) Jimi Bendel (2016), The Jimi Bendel Show (2018), City Crimes (2019), Fate of Alakada (2020), Kendra (2021), Aki and Pawpaw (2021).

Calabar Chic was named among the 12 Nigerian comedians to watch out in 2021 by The Netng.

== Personal life ==
Calabar Chic has attempted suicide twice, and suffered from fibroids.

In 2016, Calabar Chic was stuck in a burning building but managed to crawl out, thus surviving with a few bruises. In 2018, she was reportedly kidnapped by the Fulani herdsmen alongside her friend, and were hostages for five days.
