= Kiriku =

Nigerian child actor and YouTuber (born 2014)

- Born: Enorense Victory; 17 December 2014 (age 11); Benin City, Nigeria
- Other name: Abeg Shift
- Occupations: YouTuber; comedian; Actor

YouTube information
- Channel: kirikuofficial
- Years active: 2021–present
- Genres: Observational comedy; Satire
- Subscribers: 376 thousand
- Views: 72.0 million

Enorense Victory (born 17 December 2014), popularly known as Kiriku, is a Nigerian comedian, content creator and child actor.

== Career ==
Kiriku has had collaborative works with Broda Shaggi, Mr Funny and Iyanya.
