= Twyse Ereme =

Nigerian actor

Ereme Abraham
- Born: July 28, 1992 (age 33)
- Occupation: Comedian actor
- Years active: 2016–present

Ereme Abraham (born July 28, 1992), better known as Twyse is a Nigerian comedian and actor. He is best known for acting many roles in his comedy skits.

== Early life and education ==
Twyse grew up in Ibadan and he hails from Edo State, south-south geopolitical zone of Nigeria. Twyse was based in the United Kingdom for a while. In a video interview, Twyse specified that he was studying law for a short period of time before he gave it up.

== Personal life and controversy ==
In 2016, there was a circulating story about Twyse wanting to commit suicide. Twyse began tweeting about his suicidal thoughts and fans, friends and family were very concerned. Actress Toyin Abraham along with other Nigerian celebrities began to share videos of him across multiple social media platforms. Apart from comedy, Twyse is also a singer. He records his song in his leisure time.

== See also ==
- List of Nigerian comedians
- List of Nigerian actors
