= Pawzz =

Nigerian musician

- Born: David Tokuma Dekor; 14 December 2002 (age 23)
- Origin: Benue State, Nigeria
- Genres: R&B, Afro-fusion, hip hop,
- Occupations: Singer, songwriter, performing artist
- Instrument: Vocals
- Years active: 2023–present
- Label: Freeme Music

David Tokuma Dekor (born 14 December 2002), better known by his stage name Pawzz, is a Nigerian singer, songwriter and performing artist.

== Biography ==
Pawzz was born on 14 December 2002 in Port Harcourt but hails from Benue State. He was born into a Christian family and spent his high school years singing and rapping. He is the middle child with one brother and one sister. His mother encouraged him to pursue his talent as a teenager after discovering he had a talent for music and enjoyed playing the drums. He won the Coca-Cola Student Regionals Competition while still in high school. Pawzz decided to pursue music full-time in 2019 while still finishing his bachelor's degree in Mass Communication.

Talking about his name Pawzz, he revealed he chose the name because it resonates with his vision.

== Career ==
Pawzz released Koma, a bouncy, uptempo Afrobeats tune, with no mention of reciprocation of gift-giving or love on 13 January 2023.

On 20 January 2023, Pawzz released his debut project titled Prezz Play. The 5-track extended play as described by Bomi Anifowese from African Folder is an excellent first project. According to Adeayo Adebiyi of Pulse Nigeria, Pawzz's ability to make sticky music that gleans from the mainstream while maintaining his identity is a defining factor that will set him apart and upon which he will build a name for himself.

On 23 February 2023, Apple Music set Pawzz apart as the Apple Music Up Next for Nigeria. Commenting on the feature, Pawzz said, "I can't express how grateful I am to Apple Music for their love and support for my music. It just brings so much validation to my journey, the years of sacrifice and striving to achieve my dreams. I couldn't be happier or more ecstatic about this."

In his interview with African Folder, Pawzz confirmed his fanbase is called The Pride, stating that "Everyone has the right to be whoever they want to be without the constraints of society. That's what 'The Pride' is all about…"

== Discography ==
- Koma (2023)
- Prezz Play(2023)

== See also ==
- List of Nigerian musicians
