= Najite Dede =

Nigerian actress and director

- Occupations: Film actress, director
- Father: Brownson Dede
- Relatives: Michelle Dede

Najite Dede (5 November 1971) is a Nigerian director and actress. Dede has appeared in films including 30 Days (2006), The Governor (2016), and The House of Secrets (2023), and starred as Ofure Jangfa in the television series Unbroken (2019–2020).

== Early life and education ==
Her father is Mr. Brownson Dede, a Nigerian ex-diplomat to Ethiopia.

She is a sibling to Michelle Dede and a cousin to Richard Mofe Damijo who are also into the film industry.

== Career ==
Although she studied law at the University of Ibadan, she realised early that she didn't want to practice it. Instead, she chose to pursue a career in theatre, film and television, later directing V Monologues (formerly known as Vagina Monolgues).

The Nollywood actress has also shown versatility acting different roles through the years. Her film credits include Can of Worms (1999), Small Boy (2008), Ordinary People (2014), It’s Her Day (2016) and Gone Nine Months (2017).

== Filmography ==
- MTV Shuga
- Prince of Savannah
- Mamma Mia
- Heartbeat the musical
- High
- Can of worms (1999)
- 30 Days (2006) - Temilola Brisbee
- Small Boy (2008) - Aina
- Gidi Up (2013) - Ade
- Ojo's in d' House (2013) - Elizabeth Ojo
- Ordinary People (2014) - Aunty Rose
- The Governor (2016) - Elizabeth
- It's her day (2016) - Fowey
- Gone Nine Months (2017) - Agnes Olajuwon
- Unbroken (2019-2020) - Ofure Jangfa
- Riona (2020) - Arenyeka
- The House of Secrets (2023) - Sarah
- Grown (2024) - Mrs. Aje

== See also ==
- Michelle Dede
- Tope Oshin
- Theresa Edem
