= Amanda Ebeye =

Nigerian actress and model (born 1986)

Amanda Mike-Ebeye
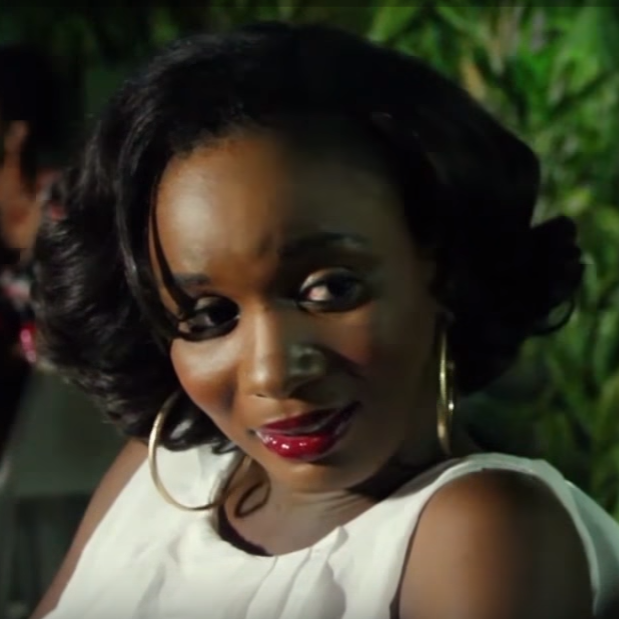
- Born: 30 April 1986 (age 40); Nigeria
- Citizenship: Nigeria
- Education: Benson Idahosa University
- Occupations: Actress, model
- Years active: 2008–present
- Known for: Her roles in Clinic Matters
- Notable work: Tales of Women
- Children: Son

Amanda Mike-Ebeye (born 30 April 1986) is a Nigerian actress and a part-time model. She is known for her roles in Clinic Matters and Super Story.

== Career ==
She made her film debut in Weeping Tiger (2008).

In a 2013 interview documented by Information Nigeria, Ebeye revealed that as a professional actress, she can go unclad on set for $50 million.

== Personal life ==
Ebeye is from the Agbor tribe of Delta State. She is a graduate of International Studies and Diplomacy from Benson Idahosa University. In 2016, she delivered a son in Canada.

The Authority revealed that Ebeye disclosed in an Instagram post that initially she wasn't looking forward to the idea of having her own kids, but since she gave birth to her son, she appreciates God for blessing her with him. In 2016, Ebeye's mother remarried. She is of the opinion that pastors should stop deceiving people.

== Filmography ==
- Finding Odera (2023) - Odera
- Seeking Solace (2022) - Alice Omotola
- The Other Side (2021) - Teni
- It's a Crazy World (2020 TV Series) - Melekwe
- Inbred (2018) - Calista
- It's Her Day (2016) - Nancy
- Tongue (2014) - Florence
- 100% Secret (2012) - Tarris
- Bursting Out (2010) - Ugochi
- Heat of the Moment (2009) - Rita
- Clinic Matter (2009)
- Dangerous Angels as Carol
- The Pastor's Daughter
- Desire (2008) - Janet
- My Last Wedding (2009) - Juliet
- Super Story (More than a friend, 2008)
- Weeping Tiger (2007) - Joy
- Keep my Love
- Super Story (Blast from past, 2007)
- Tales of Women
- The Evil Seed
- Agwonma: The Unbreakable Egg
- Sorrowful Heart (with Ebube Nwagbo and Yul Edochie)
- Everyday People (TV series)
- Indecent Lover (Film)

== Awards and nominations ==
Year	Award	Category	Result	Ref
2011	NEA Awards	Best Actress in a TV series	Nominated	
2015	Classic Media Merit Award	Most Talented Actress of the year	Won	
2015	Garden City Fashion Awards	Best Actress	Won	
2016	ZAFAA Awards	Best Actress	Nominated	
2016	NAFCA Awards	Best Lead Actress	Nominated	
