= Ninety (musician) =

Nigerian musical artist

- Born: Alabo Tuonims; 19 February 1996 (age 30)
- Origin: Rivers State, Nigeria
- Genres: R&B, Afro-fusion
- Occupations: Singer, songwriter, music producer
- Instrument: Vocals
- Years active: 2021–present
- Label: Freeme Music

Alabo Tuwonimi Tuonims (born 16 February 1996), also known by his stage name Ninety, is a Nigerian singer, songwriter and music producer.

== Biography ==
Ninety was born on 16 February 1996 in Port Harcourt. He is a Nigerian singer, songwriter, multi-instrumentalist, and record producer. He grew up in an Anglican household and is the fourth of five children and the only male. Ninety attended Kings & Queens High School and Spring Foundation School, both in Bonny Island, Rivers State, for his primary and secondary education respectively. He grew up listening to Michael Jackson, Damian Marley, and Styl Plus, and started writing his own music as early as age 15.

== Career ==
On the 19th of March, 2022, following the release of his debut single, Unruly, Ninety released Touch & Follow, his second single after joining Freeme Music.

Formerly known as Ninety6, he identifies as an Afro-Fusion artist, blending Pop, R&B, Dancehall, and Reggae.

In April 2022, Ninety released Diamond a lead single from his debut project Rare Gem.

On 28 April 2023, Ninety released his debut project titled Rare Gem. In his review of the extended play, Motolani Alake from Pulse Nigeria says "his approach aligns with his minimalistic appearance; handsome yet embellished with dreads, strong forearms and avant-garde sense of style, complete with dreads and limited jewelry."

== Honors ==
On 18 May 2023, Apple Music announced Ninety as the Apple Music Up Next for Nigeria. Commenting on the feature, Ninety said, "It's a beautiful thing making music and telling stories, but it's more beautiful when you have people listening to the music, and can resonate with the stories I tell. That connection is unmatched, and it's why I'm excited to be selected for Apple Music's 'Up Next' programme," he told Apple Music.

== Discography ==
=== EPs ===
List of extended plays with selected details
Title	EP details
Rare Gem	Released: 28 April 2022; Label: Freeme Music; Formats: Digital download, streaming

=== Singles ===
List of charted singles, with selected chart positions
Title	Year	Peak chart positions			Certifications	Album
Title	Year	NG	UK	US	Certifications	Album
"Unruly"	2021	—	—	—		TBA
"Touch & Follow"	2021	—	—	—		TBA
"Somebody"	2021	—	—	—		TBA
"Piano"	2021	—	—	—		TBA
"Diamonds"	2022	—	—	—		Rare Gem
"Smoke and Chill"	2022	—	—	—		TBA

== See also ==
- List of Nigerian musicians
