= SamSpedy =

Nigerian comedian, actor and YouTuber (born 1994)

- Born: Samuel Oluwafemi Asubiojo; May 5, 1994 (age 32); Lagos State, Nigeria
- Other name: SPD
- Education: Zaporizhzhia State Medical University
- Occupations: Comedian; YouTuber
- Years active: 2012–present

YouTube information
- Channel: SamSpedy
- Years active: 2012-present
- Genre: Comedy
- Subscribers: 4.59 million
- Views: 1,691,983,036 views
- Last updated: March 30, 2026

Samuel Oluwafemi Asubiojo (born May 5, 1994) popularly known as SamSpedy (SPD) or "Mama Ojo" is a Nigerian comedian, actor and YouTuber. He has 4 million subscribers. In October 2023, he was listed as one of top ten most streamed Nigerian YouTubers.

== Early life and education ==
Samuel Oluwafemi Asubiojo was born on May 5, 1994 in Lagos State, southwest Nigeria, but is an indigene of Ido-Osi, Ekiti State, Nigeria. He was born into the family of Mr. and Mrs. Femi Asubiojo as the second child of five children. At the age of three, his family relocated to FCT Abuja, Nigeria where he spent most of his childhood. He attended the Abuja International Academy for his primary education and Royal College for his secondary education.

In 2018, he graduated from the Zaporizhzhia State Medical University, Ukraine with a Degree in Medicine.

== Career ==
Samuel discovered his passion for comedy when he was a teenager. In 2014, while he was still in secondary school, Samuel officially started his comedy career with his debut video, which was released on YouTube. After his graduation from medical school, he returned to Nigeria and left his medical career to pursue his passion for comedy. In October 2023, he was listed as one of the top ten most streamed Nigerian YouTubers with over three million subscribers.

In 2023, he was nominated for the Trendupp Awards as the Force of YouTube and was also nominated for the Africa Entertainment Awards as the Digital Content Creator of the year alongside Mr. Marcaroni, Khaby Lame and Eddie Butita.

== Awards and recognition ==
Year	Title	Category	Result	Re
2017	Splash Awards	Comedian of the year	Won	
2022	Comedy Skit Awards	Best Skitmaker of the Year	Won	
2023	Trendupp Awards	Force of YouTube	Nominated	
2023	Africa Entertainment Awards	Digital Content Creator of the Year	Nominated	
2024	Trendupp Awards	Force of YouTube	Won	

== See also ==
- List of Nigerian comedians
