= MC Aproko =

Nigerian stand-up comedian

- Born: Gift Loveday Igbomgbo; Port Harcourt, Rivers State, Nigeria
- Occupation: Stand-up comedian

Gift Loveday Igbomgbo, known professionally as MC Aproko, is a Nigerian stand-up comedian. He is the winner of Next Naija Comedy Star and currently the special assistant on entertainment to the governor of Bayelsa State, Douye Diri, since 24 December 2020.

== Career ==
On 2 December 2017, MC Aproko won Comedy Central 'Grab The Mic' with Maltina held at Eko Convention Centre and received ₦1.5 million. On 6 May 2018, he won Ibile Comedy Challenge held at Eko Convention Centre and organized by the Lagos State Government, receiving ₦1 million.

On 20 December 2020, MC Aproko won Next Naija Comedy Star organized by Ayo Makun, receiving ₦5 million and a car.

On 23 December 2020, he was appointed special assistant on entertainment by the governor of Bayelsa State, Douye Diri.

== Personal life ==
MC Aproko was born in Port Harcourt, Rivers State, south-south Nigeria, but grew up at Nembe, Bayelsa State, Nigeria. He is a native of Bayelsa State, the second son and fifth born in a family of seven.

== See also ==
- List of Nigerian comedians
