= Officer Woos =

Nigerian Comedian

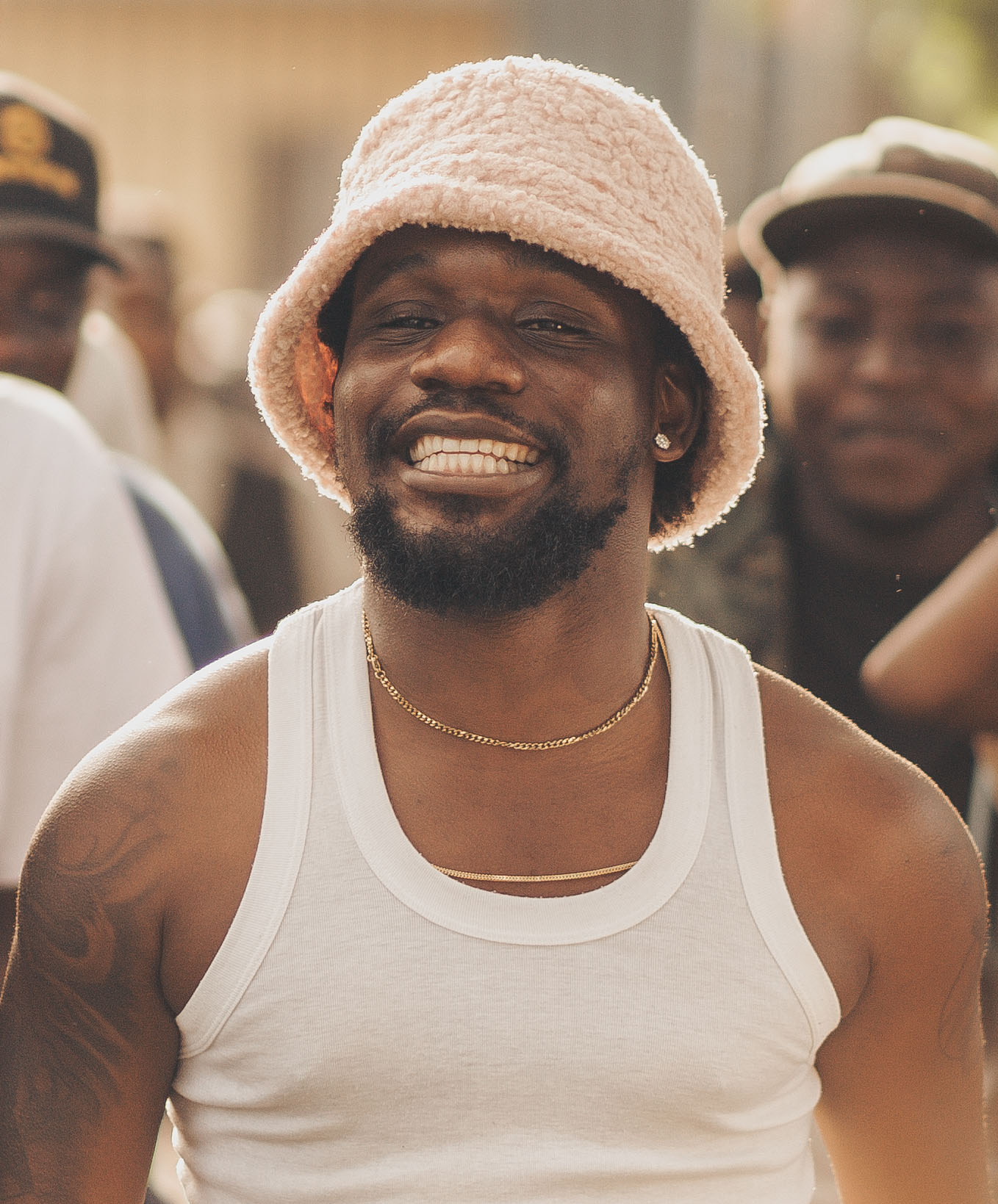
- Born: Jubril Oladapo Gbadamosi; Ibadan Oyo State, South West, Nigeria
- Occupations: Actor; Comedian
- Years active: 2019–present

Jubril Oladapo Gbadamosi (born 21 December 1996) known professionally as Officer Woos is a Nigerian comedian, vlogger and actor. In 2020, he won the City People Entertainment Award for Comedian of the Year.

He is known for his skits mimicking a stammering Nigerian police officer.

== Early life and education ==
Officer Woos was born on December 21, 1996, in Ibadan Oyo State, southwest Nigeria. He attended Concord Preparatory school, Ibadan and Maryhill Convent School, Ibadan. After secondary school, he graduated from University of Lagos in 2018 where he studied Theatre Arts.

== Comedy career and film ==
He began his comedy career in 2017 as a student of the University of Lagos with a group called Stage Addict group then founded by Broda Shaggi. He rose into the limelight in 2019 after appearing in a series of comedy videos alongside Broda Shaggi, where he played the role of an assisting police officer.

Officer Woos has performed alongside other comedians and featured in movies like Netflix thrillers Oga Bolaji, Love is Yellow and The Griot.

== Filmography ==
| Year | Title | Role |
|---|---|---|
| 2018 | Oga Bolaji | Himself |
| 2020 | Love is Yellow | |
| 2021 | The Griot | |

== See also ==
- List of Nigerian comedians
