= Chuks D General =

Nigerian stand-up comedian

Chukwuyem Israel
- Born: Chukwuyem Jude Israel; Agbor, Delta, Nigeria
- Education: Staff Model Secondary School, Agbor; Nasarawa state university, Keffi

Comedy career
- Years active: 2015-date
- Genre: Comedy
- Website: www.chuksdgeneral.com

Chuks D General (born Chukwuyem Jude Israel) is a Nigerian stand-up comedian, actor, radio presenter and host. He is best known for his spontaneous jokes and is the host of Generally Speaking, a comedy show that hosts popular celebrities across the Nigerian entertainment industry.

== Early life and education ==
Chuks D General was born on February 27 in to Agbor, Delta State, south-south Nigeria. He is a graduate of statistics from the Nasarawa State University, Keffi, northern Nigeria, where he served as the institution's Director of Socials. He formerly attended Staff Model Secondary School in Agbor, Delta State.

== Generally Speaking ==
Generally Speaking, is Chuk's annual flagship show. It has recorded three outings since inception. The show has featured celebrated names in the Nigeria's entertainment industry, such as Ali Baba, Seyi Law, and Richard Mofe-Damijo.

== See also ==
- List of Nigerian comedians
