= Prince Hezekiah =

Nigerian Comedian

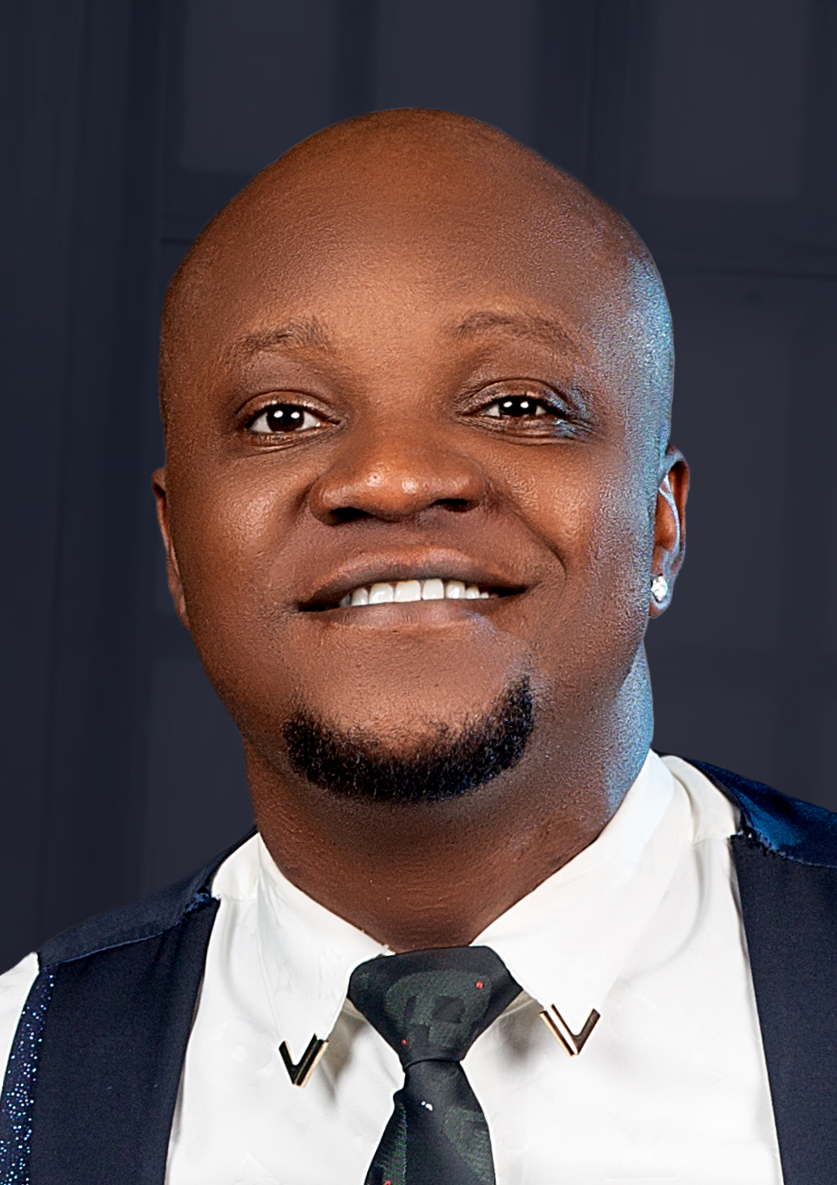
- Prince Hezekiah, in 2024
- Born: Prince Hezekiah Vincent; 26 December 1980 (age 45); Rivers State, Nigeria
- Education: University of Port Harcourt (UNIPORT)

Comedy career
- Years active: 2005–present
- Medium: Stand-up; television
- Genres: Observational comedy; Insult comedy; Satire; Self-deprecation
- Subjects: Nigeria Culture; everyday life; Popular culture; current events; Trick Comedy; Marriage
- Website: www.princehezekiahtv.com

Prince Hezekiah Vincent (born 26 December 1980), known as Prince Hezekiah, is a Nigerian comedian, content creator, and actor. He has organized many stand-up comedy shows and concerts like Made-in-Portharcourt, Funny Kingz, Humuor Xclusive, Project Laff, and lots of others.

== Biography ==
=== Early life ===
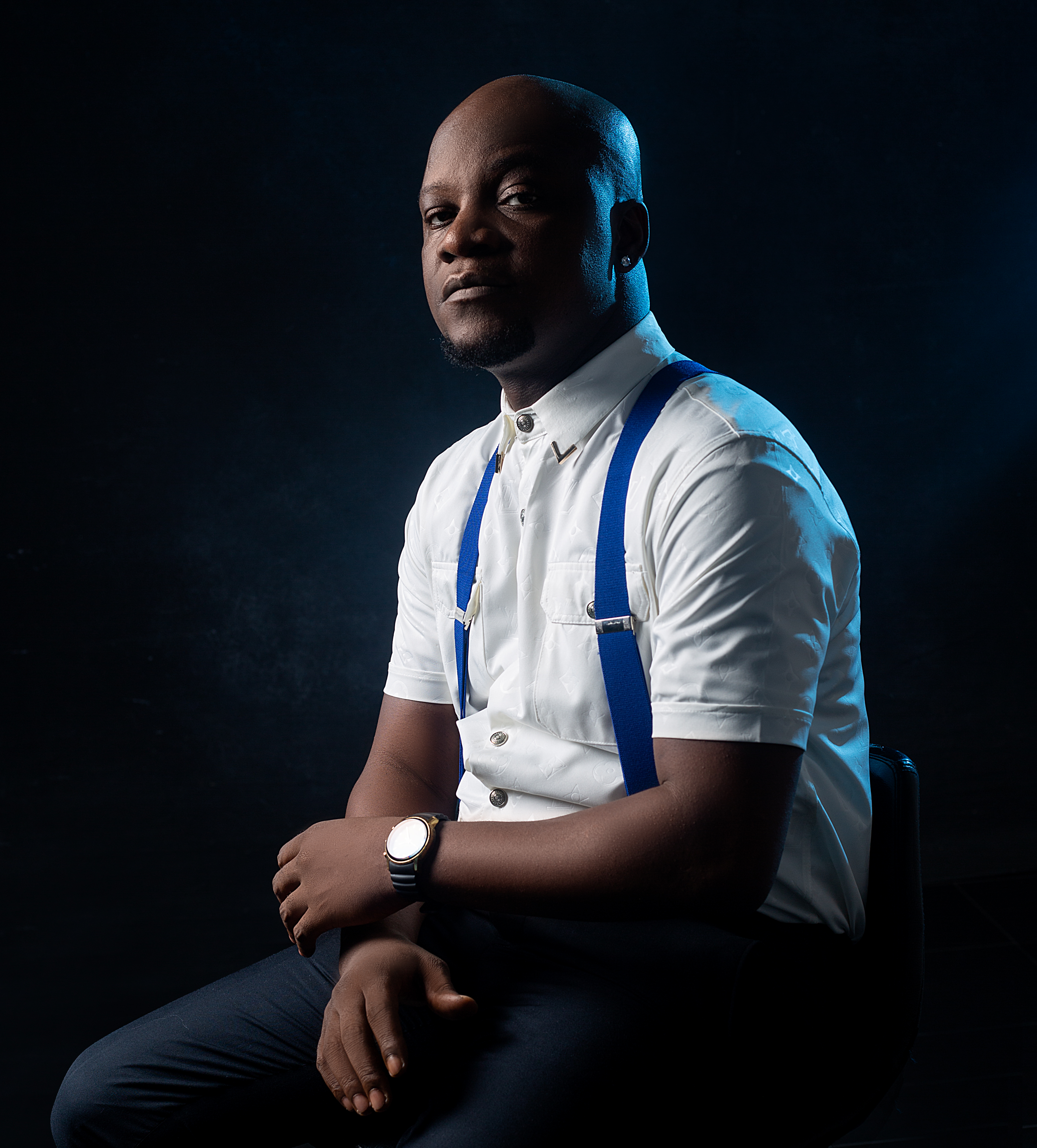
Prince Hezekiah

Prince Hezekiah Vincent, born in Akokwa Street, Mile 2, Diobu in Port-Harcourt City, he later moved to Awkuzu Street, Mile 1, Diobu in Port Harcourt City. He also grew up in Abuja estate town in Port-Harcourt city, Rivers state. He attended Sangana State Primary School, Port-Harcourt, Enitonna High School Borikiri, Port-Harcourt, and the University of Port Harcourt Choba.

He started his performances in the church. He then formed a theatre group named Liberty Productions and a dance troupe named Psalm Africa. He was also a founding member of the Nigerian Actors Guild (N.A.G.) later renamed Actors Guild of Nigeria (A.G.N.) Rivers State Chapter, and has featured in several early Nollywood movies like Oriaja, Crown Battle, Love of the Street, etc.

=== Education ===
Prince Hezekiah attended Sangana State Primary School, Port-Harcourt, Enitonna High School Borikiri, Port-Harcourt, and the University of Port Harcourt Choba all in Rivers State, Nigeria

== Appearances ==
Prince Hezekiah started his performances in the church. He then formed a theatre group named Liberty Productions and a dance troupe named Psalms Africa. He was also a founding member of the Nigerian Actors Guild (NAG) later renamed Actors Guild of Nigeria (AGN) Rivers State Chapter, and has featured in several early Nollywood movies like Oriaja, Crown Battle, Love of the Street, etc. Prince Hezekiah performed in Opa Williams' Night of a Thousand Laughs in Port Harcourt, Owerri, and Bayelsa state. Others are Crack Ya Ribs with Julius Agwu, AY Live, Glo Lafta Fest, Basketmouth's Lords of the Ribs, and Gordons' Laugh to the Moon. Others are Tales of The Funny King which the organized in 2015 at Port Harcourt River State Nigeria, in 2016 at Aztech Arcum, Stadium Road, Port Harcourt. He also performed at the Calabar Carnival, Rivers State Carnival, Rivers State Peace Carnival, and Rivers State's 50-years anniversary.

African comedy festival UK, Birmingham City Ball, performed for several Governors and Government functions like Rivers State, Bayelsa State, Akwa Ibom State, Cross Rivers State, and Imo State. He also perform at events as host or Master of Ceremonies, weddings events, coronations, dedications.

== Awards and nominations ==
Year	Award	Category	Result	Ref
-	Best Comedian Niger Delta (NDAA Awards)	-	Won	
-	Rivers State Best Comedian	PHC Art Foundation	Won	
-	Best Comedian Federated Union of Kalabari Students (FUKS)	-	Won	
-	Comedian of the Year	Kalabari Times Magazine	Won	
-	Juvenis Comedian of the year	-	Won	
