= Aki and Pawpaw =

2021 Nigerian comedy film

- Directed by: Biodun Stephen
- Written by: Steph Boyo; Ozioma Ogbaji
- Produced by: Charles Okpaleke; Moses Babatope; Kene Okwuosa; Craig Shurn
- Starring: Chinedu Ikedieze; Osita Iheme
- Production companies: FilmOne Production; Play Network Studios
- Distributed by: FilmOne Distributions
- Release date: 15 December 2021
- Running time: 132 minutes
- Country: Nigeria
- Language: English

Aki and Pawpaw is a 2021 Nigerian comedy film co-produced by Play Network Studios and Film One Entertainment. Directed by Biodun Stephen, it was a remake of the 2002 Aki na Ukwa movie produced by Chinedu Ikedieze and Osita Iheme. It was released on 15 December 2021 and began showing in cinemas nationwide on 17 December 2021. The film stars Amechi Muonagor and Real Warri Pikin. Blessing Jessica Obasi, Charles Inojie, Chioma Okafor, Uti Nwachukwu, Toyin Abraham, Stan Nze, Juliet Ibrahim, Calabar Chic, and Francis Sule.

== Synopsis ==
Aki and Pawpaw accidentally fall into wealth they had craved through fraud and now must deal with the problems that come with wealth and fame.

== Cast ==
- Chinedu Ikedieze as Aki
- Osita Iheme as Pawpaw
- Toyin Abraham as Mama Nkiru
- Amaechi Muonagor as Mazi Mbakwe
- Real Warri Pikin as Awenayerin
- Uti Nwachukwu as Panshak
- Stan Nze as Donald
- Calabar Chic
- MC Lively
- Beverly Osu as Demide
- Juliet Ibrahim as Brenda
- Hanks Anuku as Chief Priest
- Chioma Okafor as Samantha

== Awards and nominations ==
Year	Award	Category	Recipient	Result	Ref
2023	Africa Magic Viewers' Choice Awards	Best Actor In A Comedy Drama, Movie Or TV Series	Chinedu Ikedieze	Nominated	
