= Roots (The Cavemen album) =

2020 album by The Cavemen

Studio album by The Cavemen
- Released: 21 August 2020
- Recorded: 2018–20
- Studio: The Cavemen's living room
- Genre: Highlife
- Length: 54:00
- Languages: Pidgin English; Igbo
- Label: Freeme Music
- Producers: The Cavemen.; Lady Donli (exec.)

The Cavemen chronology
Roots (2020)	Love and Highlife (2021)

Roots (stylized in all caps) is the debut studio album by Nigerian highlife band The Cavemen. It was written, vocalised and produced by the duo, with fellow Nigerian singer Lady Donli serving as the executive producer and released under Freeme Music, a Nigerian indigenous record label . It was released on 21 August 2020.

== Background ==
The Cavemen worked on Roots for about 2 years before its eventual release in 2020. They album is described as being reverent to their Nigerian heritage and the music genre which reigned supreme In the country's trying times. The album art which was made with green tones is also said to represent "community". The album was recorded in their living room.

== Production and release ==
The album was produced by The Cavemen and Lady Donli served as the executive producer. It was recorded in the Cavemen's living room and released on 21 August 2020 under the FreeMe Music label following 2 years of work. It was recorded in Pidgin English and Igbo Language.

== Reception ==
A review by The Native said "the Cavemen seem to have achieved what they set out for... the 54 minutes-long set is packed with bewitching, colourful and easy listening grooves, resulting in an album that flows immaculately from front to back and favours repeat listens. In a review for Pulse Nigeria, Motolani Alake said "The sound of the album carries on the tradition of their musical ancestors, exploring the beauty that can be found in this pillar of Nigerian and African culture. This is an exploration of highlife in its full sense, with each track containing something new for listeners to take away." Dami Ajayi of The Africa Report described the album as "the most accomplished resurgence that highlife has enjoyed since Flavour N'abania sampled Rex Lawson."

== Track listing ==
All tracks are written by and produced by Kingsley Okorie and Benjamin James of the Cavemen.

Roots track listing
No.	Title	Length
1.	"Welcome to the Cave"	3:17
2.	"Akaraka"	3:35
3.	"Oge"	2:21
4.	"Bolo Bolo (Happiness in the Cave)"	3:13
5.	"Fall"	3:05
6.	"Bena"	3:51
7.	"Anita"	3:52
8.	"Ifeoma Odoo"	3:31
9.	"Crazy Lover"	3:28
10.	"Me You I"	3:01
11.	"Beautiful Rain"	3:26
12.	"Homesong"	2:03
13.	"Iro"	3:15
14.	"Obiageri (with Mama)"	3:20
15.	"Osondu"	4:18
16.	"Onye Ma Uche"	5:59
Total length:		54:31

== Awards ==
Year	Award	Category	Result	Ref
2020	The Headies	Best Alternative Album	Won	

== Charts ==
Chart performance for Roots
Chart (2022)	Peak position
Nigeria Traditional Albums (TurnTable)	1
