= National Poverty Eradication Programme =

Nigerian government program

National Poverty Eradication Programme (NAPEP) is a 2001 program by the Nigerian government addressing poverty in Nigeria and related issues. It was designed to replace the Poverty Alleviation Program.

== Background ==
Poverty in Nigeria remains significant despite high economic growth. Nigeria has one of the world's highest economic growth rates (averaging 7.4% over the last decade), an underdeveloped economy, and plenty of natural resources such as oil. However, it retains a high level of poverty, with 41% of the population classified as poor by the National Bureau of Statistics in 2019 (63% were living on less than $1 per day back in 2001). There have been governmental attempts at poverty alleviation, of which the National Poverty Eradication Programme (NAPEP) and National Poverty Eradication Council (NAPEC) are the most recent ones.

== NAPEP ==
National Poverty Eradication Programme (NAPEP) is a 2001 program by the Nigerian government aiming at poverty reduction, in particular, reduction of absolute poverty. It was designed to replace the Poverty Alleviation Program. NAPEP and NAPEC coordinate and oversee various other institutions, including ministries, and develop plans and guidelines for them to follow with regards to poverty reduction. NAPEP goals include training youths in vocational trades, to support internship, to support micro-credit, create employment in the automobile industry, and help VVF patients.

The program is seen as an improvement over the previous Nigerian government poverty-reduction programmes. According to a 2008 analysis, the program has been able to train 130,000 youths and engaged 216,000 people , but most of the beneficiaries were non-poor.

== Incidents ==
Several concerns over corruption have been raised.

In late May 2011, the program website was targeted by Nigerian hacktivists during the inauguration of Goodluck Jonathan.

In 2025, reports emerged about a fraudulent website operating under the domain napep-gov.ng, falsely presenting itself as the revived National Poverty Eradication Programme (NAPEP). The site allegedly solicited payments from applicants under the pretext of National Identification Number (NIN) verification and claimed affiliation with federal cash transfer initiatives such as the Rapid Response Register (RRR) managed by NASSCO. The fake platform reportedly promised financial support of ₦100,000 per month to registered participants. Nigerian authorities later clarified that NAPEP had long ceased to exist and that the only official government poverty reduction platform remains nassp.gov.ng.
