= Igosave =

Nigerian Comedian

Otaghware Otas Onodjayeke
- Born: 20 May 1979; Delta State, Nigeria
- Other name: Igosave

Comedy career
- Medium: Stand-up; film; television
- Genres: Observational comedy; Insult Comedy; Satire
- Subjects: Nigeria Culture; everyday life; Popular culture; current events; Nigeria politics; Nigeria Poverty; Human sexuality
- Website: www.igosave.tv

Otaghware Otas Onodjayeke, known by his stage name Igosave (born 20 May 1979) is a Nigerian comedian from Delta State, Nigeria. who had organized different shows, such as Igosave Unusual.

== Early life and education ==
Otaghware Otas Onodjayeke was born in Warri, Delta State, Nigeria in 1979. He went to Aileru Primary School and Essi Secondary School. After secondary school, he attended the Polytechnic, Auchi, where he studied painting and general art. He finished an NYSC degree at the University of Lagos.

== Comedy career ==
Igosave first performed comedy at the Nite of a 1000 Laughs show, organized by Opa Williams. During the show, he worked alongside other comedians, such as I Go Dye, Bovi, Buchi, Basketmouth, Ali Baba, Teju Babyface, and others. His annual Igosave Unusual show has held all throughout Nigeria.

== Awards ==
Pink Awards Nigeria	Comedy of the year
Akwaba Awards Ghana	Comedy of the year
Daniel Merit Award	Best Youth Comedian
NDDA Award	Comedian of the year
