= Asiricomedy =

Nigerian comedian

Damilare Oluwasegun
- Born: Damilare Osundare; 23 December 1991 (age 34); Ibadan, Nigeria
- Citizenship: Nigeria
- Education: Obafemi Awolowo University, Ajayi Crowther University.
- Occupations: Nigerian comedian and Author
- Known for: CEO/founder Humorality Comedy Academy
- Spouse: Abiodun Christiana Oluwasegun (m. 2021)
- Children: One
- Website: damilareosundare.com

Damilare Oluwasegun (born 23 December 1991) known by his stage name Asiricomedy, is a Nigerian comedian, author, and speaker. He is the founder of the Humorality Club, a hub for budding comic talents. In 2021, Damilare was enlisted as one of the Top 100 Nigerian Youth Leaders for the Royal African Young Leadership Forum (RAYLF) by His Imperial Majesty, Ooni of Ife, Oba Adeyeye Enitan Ogunwusi.

During Mr. Damilare's interview with Channels Television, "he affirmed that becoming a comedian was a coincidence, as his desire was to become a teacher after completing his undergraduate degree. However, he developed interest in comedy making during his undergraduate programme in 2010".

Aside from his stage name, he is also known as Asiri, which means secret. He trains corporate executives on subjects that include strategy, sustainability, influencer marketing, storytelling, and brand strategy. He has published four books as an author. His books were written under the pen name Damilare Osundare before he morphed into Damilare Oluwasegun.

In August 2023, he recorded a comedy special themed "Open secret".

== Education ==
Damillare is an alumnus of Obafemi Awolowo University, where he studied Microbiology and Immunology 2008-2013. In 2019, Damilare became a Fellow of the Chartered Institute of Loan and Risk Management of Nigeria (ACILRM) before he proceeded to Ajayi Crowther University, Oyo, for an MBA with a specialty in Business Administration and General Management (2019–2021).

== Books ==
- Asiri (Mystery) ISBN 978-1-9816-4315-8
- ANTICIPATION: The Fire of Process ISBN
- The Hero
- I don’t like Semo

== Personal life ==
He is married to Abiodun Christiana Oluwasegun and has one son.

== Awards and recognitions ==
- The Top 100 Nigerian Youth Leaders by the Ooni of Ife, Oba Adeyeye Enitan Ogunwusi, honoured Damilare as one of the young Nigerians leading the way in the leadership and business arenas in 2021.
- Recipient of 2017's Best Comedy Act by NEA

== See also ==
- List of Nigerian comedians
