= Tee A =

- Born: Babatunde Adewale; December 19, 1974 (age 51)
- Education: University of Lagos

Babatunde Adewale (born December 19, 1974) professionally known as Tee A is a Nigerian comedian, master of ceremonies, TV show host and content producer.

== Early life and education ==
Tee A was born in Lagos, Nigeria. He had his primary school education in St. Paul's Anglican primary school Idi oro. Muslin before proceeding to Birch Freeman High School Surulere Lagos and then to the University of Lagos Akoka Yaba Lagos and American Comedy Institute ACI, New York.

== Career ==
Tee A started out as a stand-up comedian as an undergraduate in University of Lagos in 1995. He met his mentor Alibaba Akpobome in 1996 and became further inspired to pursue a full-time career in comedy and in the entertainment industry.
