= Chioma Okafor (actress) =

Nigerian actress

- Born: 10 November 1994 (age 31)
- Occupation: Actress
- Notable work: Aki and Pawpaw

Chioma Okafor is a Nigerian actress and model. She is best known for her roles in the Netflix film Aki and Pawpaw, Wale Adenuga Production's Super Story (season title: Monica) and Africa Magic's TV series Riona and Flatmates.

== Early life and education ==
Okafor was born on 10 November 1994, in Anambra. She originates from Idemili South local government area, Anambra, where she had her early education.

== Career ==
Okafor began her acting career in 2018 while studying at the university. She featured in movies and TV series such as Getting Over Him, Almost a Virgin, Seducing Mr Perfect, Africa Magic’s Brethen, House 31 and many more. She also performed in stage plays such as Hear Word! and OMG the Musical.

In 2019, Okafor rose to prominence after starring as the lead actress alongside Nollywood actors Zack Orji, Tina Mba, Funsho Adeolu, Norbert Young, Yemi Solade and Gloria Young in the Nigerian primetime family TV drama series Superstory in the season titled Monica.

In 2021, Okafor starred in Netflix’s comedy Aki and Pawpaw alongside Nollywood stars Chinedu Ikedieze and Osita Iheme. She also starred in a short film "Without You" and Accelerate TV web series Visa on Arrival. Same year, she emerged first runner-up in “Rita Dominic Acting Challenge” and was listed by FilmOne Nigeria as one of its box office breakthrough actresses for her lead role in Aki and Pawpaw.

In 2022, Okafor won the Nigeria Women Achievers Award in the Nollywood New Actress category for an outstanding performance over the year.

In 2023, Okafor featured in reboot of Nigeria classic film Domitila: The Sequel which highlights the dangers of sex work in Nigeria.

== Filmography ==
=== Television ===
- Flatmates (2017) as Tiana
- Riona (2020) as Omonigho
- Super Story: Monica
- House 31

=== Films ===
- Mad Couple (2014) as Ekwy
- Getting Over Him (2018) as Agnes
- Almost A Virgin (2018) as Kiki
- Seducing Mr. Perfect (2019) as Uzo
- The Rejected Stone (2019)
- Season of the Vow (2020) as Uche
- Ghost Story (2020)
- Aki and Pawpaw (2021) as Samantha
- Everybody Wants Alvin (2022) as Ada
- Domitila: The Sequel (2023) as Uche
- Buka Girl (2024) as Ekenna
- Man in Love (2024) as Victoria
