= Michael Ugwu =

British music industry executive

- Obiora
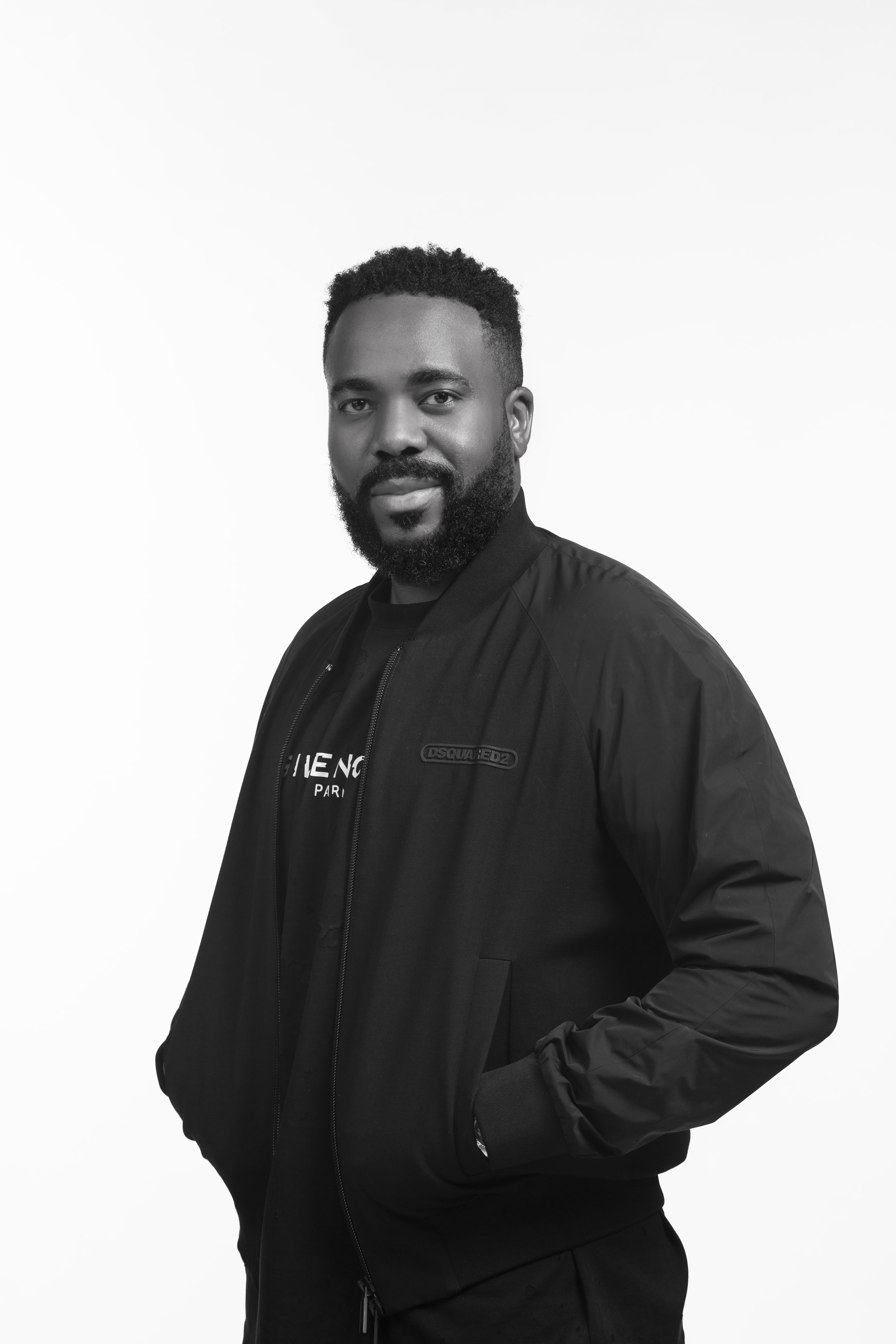
- Born: December 3, 1980 (age 45); Manchester, England
- Other names: Magic Mike
- Occupations: Entrepreneur; Investor; Media Proprietor
- Known for: Pioneer GM for Sony Music Entertainment in West Africa, the first major label to open up shop in West Africa, headquartered in Lagos, Nigeria General Manager, Sony Music Entertainment, West Africa Founder/CEO, Freeme Digital

Michael Ugwu is a British music industry executive, investor and entrepreneur in Nigeria's music and entertainment industry. He was formerly the General Manager of Sony Music Entertainment, West Africa. He is the founder and CEO of Freeme Digital. Prior to this, Ugwu was the CEO of iROKING Ltd

== Career ==
From 2010 to 2013, Ugwu was the CEO at iROKING, an online digital music platform focused on the Nigerian Entertainment Industry.

He founded Freeme Digital limited in 2013 and in 2020, he became the first Nigerian to be appointed to the board of the Merlin Network. He was reappointed to the board of Merlin in January 2022.

Ugwu has investments in multiple start-up companies including Shecluded, Coin Profile, Buycoins Africa, Atide Solutions and Spendify.

== Controversy ==
Ugwu has been accused by YCEE of unethical or unfair business practices. He was dismissed from iROKING allegedly over issues involving working with a competing service. Ugwu has disputed iROKING's claims.

In 2020, Ugwu announced that he had been acquitted of all charges brought against him by iROKING, at the Federal High Court and Industrial Court.

== Honors and recognition ==
- Choiseul 100 Africa 2017
- Ranked in Billboard's 2021 Indie Power Players

== Personal life ==
In 2019, Ugwu married Onyeka Udechukwu.
