= It's Her Day =

- Directed by: Aniedi Anwah
- Written by: Bovi Ugboma
- Screenplay by: Bovi Ugboma
- Produced by: Bovi Ugboma
- Starring: Bovi Ugboma; Ini Dima-Okojie; Shaffy Bello; Amanda Mike-Ebeye; Toni Tones; Adunni Ade; Najite Dede; Gregory Ojefua; Thelma Ezeamaka; Femi Durojaiye; Ese Lami George
- Cinematography: Emeka Madu
- Edited by: Akin Alabi
- Music by: Harrison "Babariq" Eke
- Production company: Kountry Kulture Network
- Distributed by: Silverbird Distribution
- Release dates: 9 October 2016 (Lagos, Nigeria)
- Country: Nigeria
- Language: English
- Box office: ₦55,021,150 (Raked ₦12M in the opening weekend)

It's Her Day is a 2016 Nigerian comedy drama film about an engaged couple from different social backgrounds and the class struggle they encounter while planning their high-end wedding. Bovi Ugboma plays Victor, a newly engaged man pressured to give his materialistic fiancée, Nicole (Ini Dima-Okojie) an extravagant fairy tale wedding. The film was produced by Bovi Ugboma and directed by Aniedi Anwah and premiered on 9 September 2016 in Lagos, Nigeria.

== Synopsis ==
Victor arrives home from the UK to marry his fiancée, the uptight Nicole Hernández who wastes no time planning the fairytale wedding of her dreams. With Nicole's snooty mother meddling over every detail, Victor finds the cost is far beyond his budget. Despite repeated warnings from his best friend Omonigho whom Nicole loathes—along with his Warri-based family including his no-nonsense Aunt Foweh—Victor is pressured to appease not only Nicole and her mother but also the equally demanding Hernández sisters—Stacey, Nancy, and Augusta. With the help of a high-end wedding planner, the Hernándezes overlook every detail of Nicole's big day, while Victor's own suggestions are either ignored or ridiculed.

Trouble ensues at the couple's native engagement ceremony when Victor sprays his bride with naira notes instead of dollar bills. He apologises, but Nicole's bridezilla demands persist. He now regrets breaking up with Angela, the ex-girlfriend he left for Nicole, and attempts to win her back. However, she sees through his facade and advises him to resist keeping up appearances for clout. During a pre-marriage counseling session, Victor and Nicole stir up chaos when she focuses more on her Candy Crush and ignores the meeting. He breaks up with her, a move Omonigho approves, but upon discovering Angela now has a new man, he reconciles with Nicole.

Victor recruits his friends to stand in as decoys via a phone conversation with the Hernándezes after they insist on booking celebrity music artistes to perform at the wedding. A stag party is held, and the next morning Victor, hungover from the night before, is horrified that he is late for the wedding. His groomsmen worsen the situation by hiring kekes to take him and his groomsmen to the church, fulfilling an old pact. They arrive in the middle of Mr.s Hernández' interview with HipTV, causing her embarrassment live on air, and she slaps him in front of his horrified friends. Upon realising Nicole will forever remain an ungrateful snob after she rejects his ring, Victor dumps her at the altar and storms out.

Victor and his groomsmen arrive at Angela's house and beg her to consider rekindling her old relationship. Although she accepts his apology, Angela has not forgotten the hurt she endured after he abandoned her, and chases them away with a whip.

== Cast ==
- Bovi Ugboma as Victor Elomena/Victor Smith
- Ini Dima-Okojie as Nicole Hernández
- Shaffy Bello as Mrs Hernández
- Toni Tones as Stacy Hernández
- Thelma Ezeamaka as Augusta Hernández
- Amanda Mike-Ebeye as Nancy Hernández
- Adunni Ade as Caroline, wedding planner
- Najite Dede as Aunty Foweh
- Gregory Ojefua as Omonigho
- Femi Durojaiye as Dede
- Ese Lami George as Victoria
- Omoni Oboli as Angela

== Production ==
The film is produced by Bovi Ugboma. Directed by Aniedi Anwah. In Kountry Kulture Network, distributed by Silverbird Distribution.

== Release ==
The movie premiered in Lagos, Nigeria on 9 September.
