= Dead Serious (film) =

2024 Nigerian romantic comedy film

- Directed by: Moses Inwang
- Produced by: David Rukeme
- Starring: Sharon Ooja; Sabinus; Nkem Owoh; Lilian Afegbai; Deyemi Okanlawon
- Production companies: Fortress Studio; Filmrite Studios
- Distributed by: Bluepictures Distributions
- Release date: 23 February 2024
- Running time: 120 minutes
- Country: Nigeria
- Language: English

Dead Serious is a 2024 Showmax original Nigerian romantic comedy film, released on 23 February 2024. It was directed by Moses Inwang, and produced by David Rukeme. It stars Sharon Ooja, Emmanuel Chukwuemeka Ejekwu, Nkem Owoh, Lilian Afegbai, Deyemi Okanlawon, Albert Oluwatoyin, Funky Mallam, Emem Inwang, Ryonne Razaq, and Lawal Nasiru.

== Synopsis ==
Heartbroken after losing the love of his life, a young man makes a series of unsuccessful attempts to take his own life.This movie shows the sacrifice one is willing to pay for love.

== Cast ==
=== Main ===
- Sharon Ooja as Amara
- Sabinus as Johnny
- Deyemi Okanlawon as Deremi
- Nkem Owoh as Mr. Kalu
- Lilian Afegbai
- Albert Oluwatoyin Tomama as Vero
- Funky Mallam
- Emem Inwang
- Ryonne Becky Razaq
- Lawal Nasiru as Pato

== Production ==
=== Acquired ===
On 10 February 2024, film reporter for In Nollywood, Matilda Adegbola, says "Showmax had acquired the film", following the post made by film director Moses Inwang on Instagram that hints that the film scheduled for cinemas would now be a Showmax Original. On 14 February 2024, the film previously scheduled to debut on Showmax.

== Premiere and release ==
On 22 January 2024, the official trailer was released with a line-up of Sharon Ooja, Sabinus, Nkem Owoh, Lilian Afegbai, Deyemi Okanlawon, Warri Girl, Funky Mallam, Emem Inwang and Ryonne Razaq. The film was previously scheduled to debut on February 9, across cinemas nationwide. On 9 February 2024, Dead Serious premiered during the official launch of the new Showmax 2.0. On 16 February 2024, showmax released its official trailer of the film, and was made available for streaming on 23 February 2024.
