= Demgohearword =

Nigerian comedian

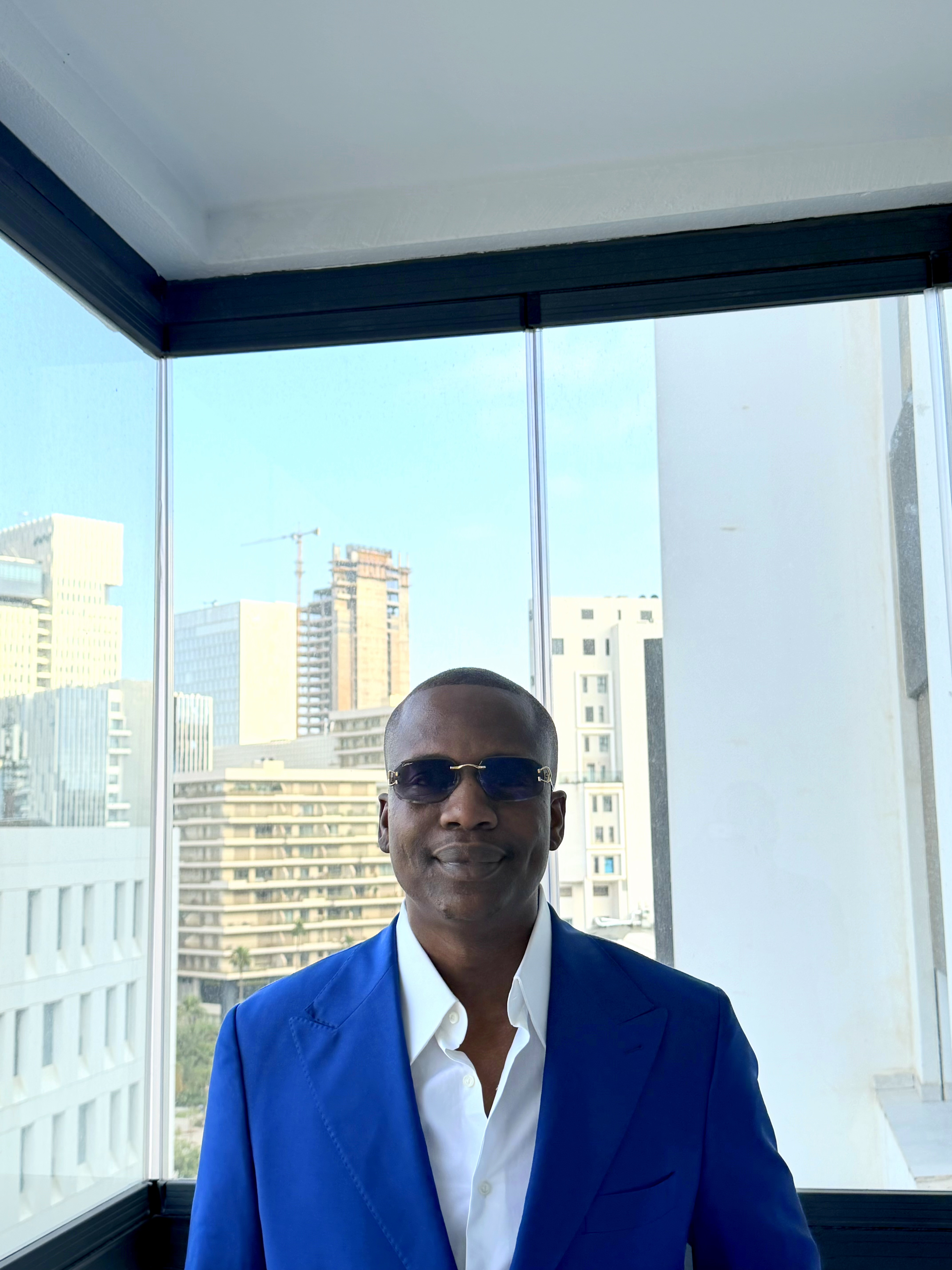
- Palmer in 2026
- Born: Ekpe Peter Unuajohwofia; May 18, 1993 (age 33); Warri, Delta state
- Citizenship: Nigerian
- Education: Houdegbe North America University
- Occupations: Entrepreneur; Activist and Social Media Influencer.
- Known for: Warri slang and Waffi English
- Website: demgohearword.com

Peter Palmer (born May 18, 1993) popularly known as Demgohearword is a Nigerian businessman and social media influencer.

== Biography ==
=== Early life and education ===
Peter was born in Okpara Island, Ethiope East Local Government Area of Delta State, Nigeria, where he spent his early years. He is the thirteenth child in a family of sixteen children.

Palmer began his primary education at Petiwas Nursery and Primary School, Effurun, Delta state. He latter attended Our Lady of Mercy Secondary School, Orerokpe, and completed his secondary education at First Baptist Secondary school. He subsequently enrolled in the pre-degree programme at Delta State University, Abraka, before continue his higher education at Houdegbe North America University Benin, where he earned a (B.Sc.) degree in Political science.

=== Career ===
Palmer began his professional career in administration and corporate operations. 2017, he served as head of administration at Integrity Engineering and Contracting Company (IECC) in the sultanate of Oman.

He later became involved in entrepreneurship, business development, media, and social advocacy. In 2024, he became the founder and chief executive officer of PalyksPalm Group, an organization established in 2024. He is known for his activities on social media and online advocacy, as well as content creation that incorporates elements of Warri slang and Waffi English. He is the founder of demgohearwordfoundation.

=== Philanthropy ===
Palmer is also involved in charitable and community-development initiatives. He founded the Demgohearword Foundation, a non-profit organization dedicated to supporting vulnerable individuals and promoting social welfare initiatives.

He has advocated for community development, youth empowerment, and support for less-privileged individuals. Through his philanthropic activities, he conducted a seven-day humanitarian outreach programme in 2020 across various communities in Warri, Delta State, Nigeria, through his foundation, during which food items and other relief materials were distributed to residents affected by economic hardship.
