= Bovi =

Nigerian Comedian

Bovi Ugboma
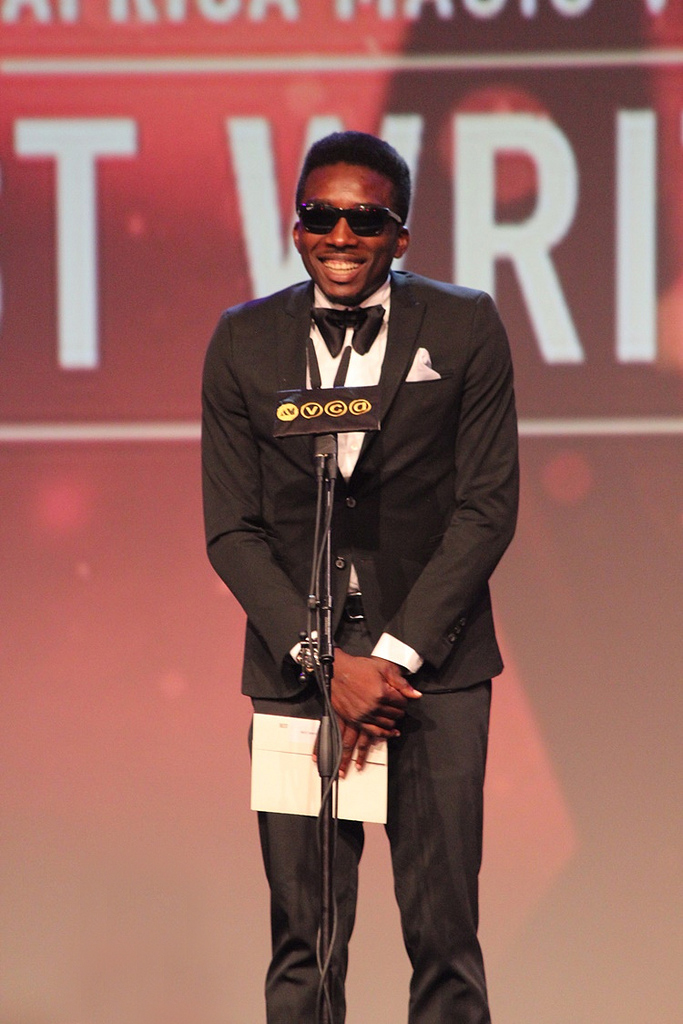
- Bovi in 2014
- Born: Bovi Ugboma; 25 September 1979 (age 47); Benin City, Nigeria
- Education: Delta State University
- Notable work: Extended Family; The Bovi Ugboma Show; Bovi: Man on Fire
- Spouse: Kris Asimonye Ugboma (m. 2009)
- Children: 3

Comedy career
- Years active: 2007–present
- Medium: Stand-up; film; television
- Genres: Observational comedy; satire
- Subjects: Nigeria Culture; everyday life; popular culture; current events; Nigerian politics; marriage

Bovi Ugboma is a Nigerian stand-up comedian, actor, and writer. He has organized popular stand-up comedy concerts like Bovi: Man on Fire across the globe.

== Early life and education ==
Bovi Ugboma was born in Benin City, the capital of Edo State. He attended UNIBEN staff school for his primary education. In 1991, he was enrolled in Government College, Ughelli in Delta State. For disciplinary reasons and fear from his parents of his development as a youth, he was removed from boarding school and transferred to Edokpolor Grammar School in Benin City, where they lived. That move proved unproductive and he moved to his third secondary school, Boys Model Secondary School, Onicha Olona, an all boarding school. After completing his secondary education, he gained admission in Delta State University in 1998, where he studied Theatre Arts.

== Comedy career ==
=== 2007 ===
Bovi began his career in April 2007, starring in the sitcom Extended Family, which he also wrote and produced. The show was popular with fans.

=== 2008–2011 ===
Bovi was an emerging force in comedy shows and events throughout Nigeria. he made his stand-up comedy debut in Nigeria's premiere comedy franchise, Night of a thousand laughs organized by Opa Williams.

=== 2013–2014 ===
Bovi's first stand-up special was held at Eko convention center. He followed it up in 2014 with a sequel titled Bovi: Man on Fire, which featured performances by international music stars Ja Rule and Ashanti. Bovi took the one-man special to several cities in the United States, London, Melbourne, Kyiv, Brisbane, Sydney, Moscow and Toronto.

=== 2017 ===
He went on a break for three years after the 2014 edition of the show, after the hiatus, the Man on Fire franchise returned to Lagos and it was the most successful yet. The fourth edition in Lagos held in April 2019 and Bovi said it is the last of the man on Fire franchise. He says his next special will go by another title. Bovi began a series titled Back To School in 2018 which he uploads in his YouTube channel. Bovi has worked alongside other Nigerian comedians such as I Go Dye, I Go Save, Basketmouth, Buchi, Odogwu, Okey Bakassi, Julius Agwu and many others.

=== 2022 ===
In July 2022, Bovi held his latest comedy special, Bovi- Naughty By Nature in Lagos and it was sold out two days before the show.

== Movies ==
=== 2015–2018 ===
Bovi premiered his first movie It's Her Day on 9 September 2016. The movie grossed 55 million Naira in the Nigerian box office. In 2016, he starred in the romantic comedy, 4-1-Love as the lead actor.

In 2017, he was nominated for the AMVCA awards as the best actor in comedy; his third individual nomination since the inception of the AMVCA and the fourth from his works. The movie, though lacking in mainstream publicity, went on to have a decent run in the cinemas and grossed 55 million naira at the box office.

=== 2020 ===
In 2020 he starred as a police officer in the remake of the Nollywood classic Nneka the Pretty Serpent.

=== 2021 ===
He also wrote, co-produced and starred in his second film, My Village People. The film went on went on to join the list of 17 Nigerian films to gross100 million naira in the local box office.

== Personal life ==
Bovi is married to Kris Asimonye Ugboma, and they have three children.

In January 2022, his wife underwent surgery after an episode of ectopic pregnancy, which ruptured one of her fallopian tubes.

The two celebrated their 13th anniversary on 19 September 2022, with Bovi praising his wife for taming him and carrying his children for 27 months altogether.

== Awards and nominations ==
Year	Award	Category	Result	Ref
2021	Net Honours	Most Popular Comedian	Won	
2021	AMVCA	Best Actor in a Comedy	Nominated	
2023	Africa Magic Viewers' Choice Awards	Best Television Series	Nominated	

== Filmography ==
Films
Year	Title	Role	Ref
2004	Indecent girl	Hotel manager	
2004	Standing alone	Doctor	
2016	4-1-Love	Osaze	
2016	It’s Her Day	Victor Smith	
2018	International Affairs	Segun	
2020	Nneka The Pretty Serpent	Inspector Dan	
2021	My Village People	Prince	
2021	Visa on Arrival	Francis	
2022	The Perfect Arrangement	Chidi	
2023	Raised Apart	Bamidele / Ejiro	

TV sitcoms
Year	Title	Ref
2007–2008	Extended family	
2009–2010	The Bovi Ugboma Show	

Web series
Year	Title	Ref
2018–2022	Back To School	
2019–2022	Banana Republic	
2021–present	Visa On Arrival	

== See also ==
- List of Nigerian comedians
