= The Cavemen (band) =

Nigerian Highlife band

The Cavemen.
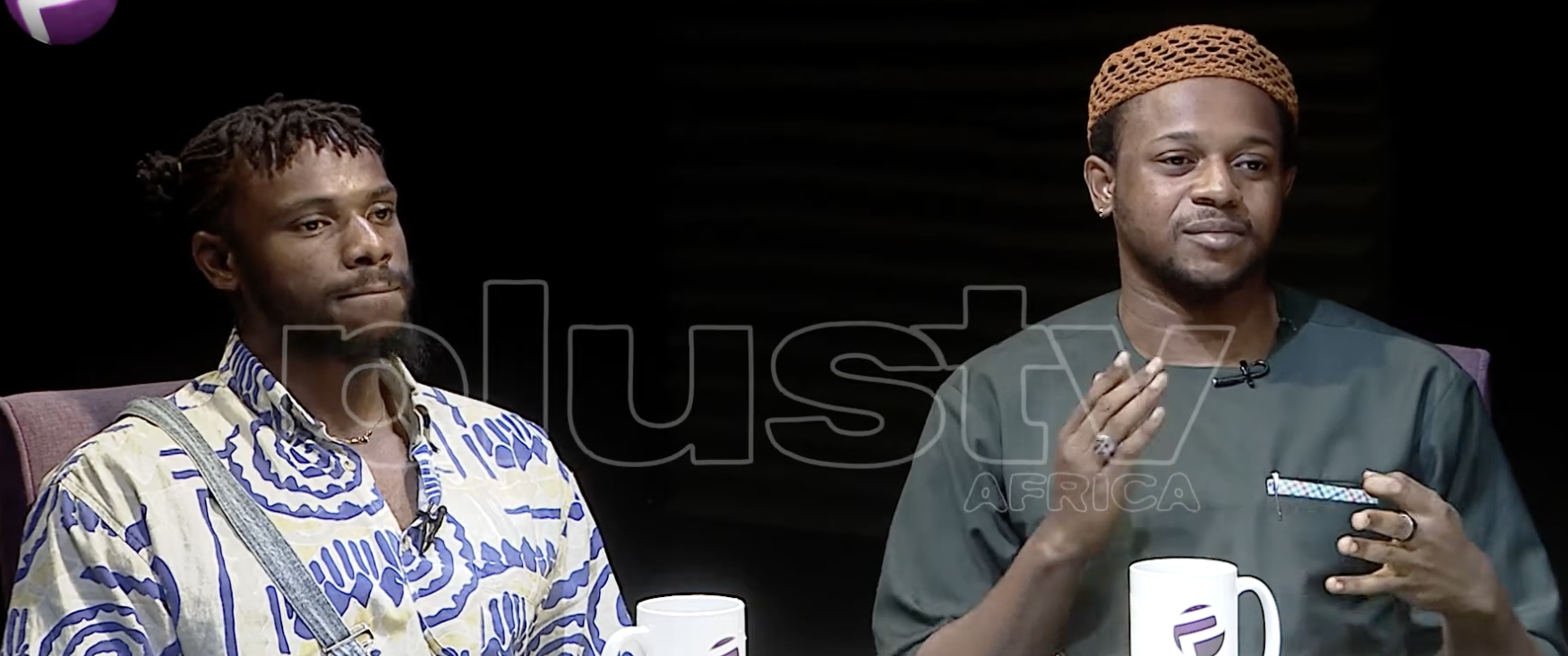

Background information
- Origin: Imo State, Nigeria
- Genres: Highlife
- Instruments: Bass, drums
- Years active: 2020–present
- Label: Sounds From The Cave
- Members: Kingsley Okorie; Benjamin James

The Cavemen (stylized as The Cavemen.) are a Nigerian highlife band consisting of sibling duo Kingsley Okorie, a bassist, and Benjamin James, a drummer. They gained wider recognition through their association with Lady Donli and are known for their live performances. In August 2020, they released their debut album Roots, which won Best Alternative Album at The Headies 2020.

== Early life and education ==
The Cavemen are from Orlu, Imo State and started out as choristers. Okorie earned a law degree from Babcock University and Nigerian Law School's Kano campus. James attended Peter King College of Music, Badagry, Lagos State.

The Cavemen were officially formed in March 2018 and they stylised their band name with a dot to avoid lawsuits from a New Zealand artist with the trademarked name.

== Career ==
They released their debut single, ''Osondu'' in 2020 and released their debut album, Roots in August 2020. The album was recorded in their living room and was fully produced by the duo. They also produced 11 of the songs on Lady Donli's Enjoy Your Life album who in turn was a co-executive producer on Roots. They performed at the finale show of the fifth season of Big Brother Naija. Their second album Love and Highlife was released in October 2021, with guest appearances from Cobhams Asuquo, Made Kuti, PC Lapez and Etuk Ubong. In 2023, the duo appeared on Davido's Timeless album.

== Legacy ==
The Cavemen have been praised for creating highlife in a way which retains its essence. Writer Michael Chukwudera stated that the duo's music is inspired by Oliver De Coque, and is centered around love and philosophy.

== Discography ==
=== Studio albums ===
Year	Title	Details	Ref
2020	Roots	Released: August 21, 2020 (NG); Label: Freeme Music; Formats: digital download, streaming	
2021	Love and Highlife	Released: October 29, 2021 (NG); Label: Sounds from the Cave, Stellar International, Immensum Music; Formats: digital download, streaming	
2025	Cavy in the City	Released: October 31, 2025 (NG); Label: Sounds from the Cave, RCA Records; Formats: digital download, streaming	

=== Singles ===
Year	Title	Album
2020	''Osondu''	Roots
2020	"Anita"	Roots
2020	"Who No Know Go Know"	TBA
2023	"Open Your Mind/Saviour"	
2024	"What a Day That Was"	TBA

== Videography ==
"Bena" - 2020

"Adaugo" - 2023

== Awards ==
Year	Award	Category	Nominee/Work	Result	Ref
2020	The Headies 2020	Best Alternative Album	The Cavemen - Roots	Won	
