= Egungun of Lagos =

Nigerian content creator

- Born: Kuye Oghenevwede Adegoke; 5 March 1995 (age 31)
- Other name: Egungun
- Education: University of Lagos
- Occupation: Social media personality
- Years active: 2018–present

Kuye Oghenevwede Adegoke (born 5 March 1995) professionally known as Egungun of Lagos or just Egungun, is a Nigerian Internet personality. He gained mainstream attention when his videos were reposted on social media by Snoop Dogg, Tunde Ednut.

== Early life and education ==
Kuye Oghenevwede Adegoke was born on 5 March 1995, and grew up between Okitipupa in Ondo State and Agbarho in Delta State.

He attended Royfield Junior School and Lagos State Model College, Igbokuta for his secondary education, and earned a bachelor's degree in biology from the University of Lagos.

== Career ==
Egungun of Lagos started his content creation career in 2018. He began as a dancer in school, where he was initially recognised. He made up the name "Egungun", after wearing the Yoruba masquerade Egungun, and switching to informal interviews. He is also known for his catchphrase, "Damn! It's massive baby!" which became popular in Nigeria. During the period, he drew mainstream attention when Memezar, Snoop Dogg and Tunde Ednut reposted on their social media handles, some of his videos.
