= Poverty in Nigeria =

Nigeria had one of the world's highest economic growth rates, averaging 7.4% according to the Nigeria economic report that was released in July 2019 by the World Bank. Following the oil price collapse in 2014–2016, combined with negative production shocks, the gross domestic product (GDP) growth rate dropped to 2.7% in 2015. In 2016 during its first recession in 25 years, the economy contracted by 1.6%. Nationally, 43 percent of Nigerians (89 million people) live below the poverty line, while another 25 percent (53 million) are at risk of poverty. For a country with massive wealth and a huge population to support commerce, a well-developed economy, and plenty of natural resources such as oil, the level of poverty remains unacceptable. However, poverty may have been overestimated due to the lack of information on the extremely huge informal sector of the economy, estimated at around 60% more, of the current GDP figures. As of 2018, the population growth rate is higher than the economic growth rate, leading to a slow rise in poverty. According to a 2018 report by the World Bank, almost half the population is living below the international poverty line ($2 per day), and unemployment peaked at 23.1%.

Nigeria had one of the world's highest economic growth rates, averaging 7.4% according to the Nigeria economic report that was released in July 2019 by the World Bank. Following the oil price collapse in 2014–2016, combined with negative production shocks, the GDP growth rate dropped to 2.7% in 2015. In 2016 during its first recession in 25 years, the economy contracted by 1.6%. Many individuals are faced with limited financial opportunities, extreme information poverty and unemployment, a lack of access to information technology resources, and other uniquely debilitating environmental circumstances as poverty.

However, these programs have largely failed to overcome the three reasons for this persistent poverty: income inequality, ethnic conflict, and political instability with corruption. The impact of COVID-19 has been disastrous to the economy with inflation on food items on the rise, markets were disrupted by the increase in prices of things and purchasing power.

== Income inequality ==
A slum in Lagos, Nigeria

As of 2010, the Gini coefficient of Nigeria is rated medium, at 0.43. However, there are more rural poor than urban poor. This is correlated with differential access to infrastructure and amenities. This results from the composition of Nigeria's economy, especially the energy (oil) and agriculture sectors. Oil exports contribute significantly to government revenues; it contributes 9% to the GDP, and employs only a fraction of the population. Agriculture, however, contributes to about 17% of GDP, and employs about 30% of the population.

This incongruence is compounded by the fact that oil revenue is poorly distributed among the population, with higher government spending in urban areas than rurally. High unemployment rates render personal incomes even more divergent. Moreover, the process of oil extraction has resulted in significant pollution, which further harms the agricultural sector. Additionally, agriculture growth has slowed down because of farmer-herdsmen clashes, revolts in the north-east, and floods. The majority of Nigeria's better paying jobs are in capital-intensive sectors, but they are very scarce and limited. Only the places striving with economic activity and are very capital-intensive, possess law firms, small local businesses, and the governing powers.

== Long-term ethnic conflict and civil unrest ==
Nigeria has historically experienced much ethnic conflict. (Note: Nigeria has almost 250 ethnic groups and two major religions (Islam and Christianity).) With the return to civilian rule in 1999, militants from religious and ethnic groups have become markedly more violent. While this unrest has its roots in poverty and economic competition, its economic and human damages further escalate the problems of poverty (such as increasing the mortality rate). For instance, ethnic unrest and the displeasure to local communities with oil companies has contributed to the conflict over oil trade in the Niger Delta, which threatens the productivity of oil trade. Civil unrest might also have contributed to the adoption of populist policy measures which work in the short-run, but impede poverty alleviation efforts.

Poverty by Zone

The total expenditure of food and non-food produce a poverty incidence of 60.2 percent or 89,096,000 Nigerians living in poverty. This measure is used for poverty headcount comparison across countries. Poverty Line is N54,401.16.

The people living in the Northern region and rural areas of Nigeria were confirmed to be the poorest according to research. Poverty has also been increasing in the North and Northwest areas of the country as they account for 87% of poor people in Nigeria as of 2016. The Governor of Borno state Kashi Shettima expressed during one of his press conference that "In Nigeria, poverty wears a northern cap, if you are looking for a poor man, get somebody wearing a northern cap."

Poverty by State

Absolute poverty by state in Nigeria

Most Southern states had the lowest percentage while Sokoto state had a very high one as of 2019.

== Political instability and corruption ==
Nigeria's large population and historic ethnic instability has led to the adoption of a federal government. The resultant fiscal decentralisation provides Nigeria's state and local governments considerable autonomy, including control over 50% of government revenues, as well as responsibility for providing public services.

The lack of a stringent regulatory and monitoring system has allowed for rampant corruption. This has hindered past poverty alleviation efforts to a large extent, since resources which could pay for public goods or directed towards investment (and so create employment and other opportunities for citizens) are being misappropriated. Nigerian corruption and poverty are interrelated and encourages each other. When looking at human development, Nigeria is at the bottom of the scale and corruption scores highest. Its existence is in all levels in the government – Local, State and even in the national departments. As a result of extreme corruption, even the poverty reduction programs suffer from no funding and have failed to give the needed remedy to this country. One of the reasons for the continued success of corruption is the encouragement that it receives from the government. Critics have blamed the Buhari led government for encouraging corruption in Nigeria by not dealing with defaulters and not showing fairness and openness in the fight against corruption in Nigeria. Government shows tolerance towards corruption and corrupted officials to the extent that the officials facing indictment are pardoned and accepted into the society. Is there a remedy to eradicate corruption? The answer lies in the hands of Nigeria's federal government. They must get involved more and implant stronger reduction programs and ensure that it is being followed by all the officials and the departments. Just by eradication corruption, Nigeria could come out of poverty. Taking care of corruption is taking care of poverty.

== Economic evolution ==
The management of oil revenues impacted the economy and the level of poverty in Nigeria by a considerable amount, leading up to 1985. As a result of the profiting oil businesses, much of the oil revenues were spent expecting that the oil prices would continue to increase. This aggressive spending led to the rise of per capita income from N1,200 in 1972 to nearly N2,900 in 1980, according to 1987 prices (In $US at the time from $280 to $1,100). So when the oil revenue crumbled the real capital income decreased heavily and Nigeria's economy took a big hit. During this shift to a focus on the oil boom, the agricultural sector, where the majority of people made a living, had a sharp drop occur. Throughout this oil boom period, naira (Nigerian currency) increased, and agricultural exports dropped by almost half the value and half the volume. Non-agricultural wages dropped massively as the labor workers increased in non-agricultural jobs because of the steady migration to more urban areas. As these wages decreased, agriculture prevailed temporarily but eventually ended up declining as well. As a result, the gap created by the oil boom of agricultural and non-agricultural profits finally stabilized. The economy began to decline in the 1980s due to a sharp decline in oil prices in 1982 and agriculture continued to deteriorate. As a result, wages continued to decline and unemployment grew further in the mid-1980s. In recent times, there have been investigations into reckless spending of revenues gotten from oil sales. This loses would have been used to generate employment for Nigerian if they are being invested into the public sector for the growth and development of the country.

== Defining poverty ==
=== Economic measures ===
Poverty is the lack of, or the inability to achieve socially acceptable standard of living. Officially, there is no poverty line put in place for Nigeria but for the sake of poverty analysis, the mean per capita household is used. So, there are two poverty lines that are used to classify where people stand financially. The upper poverty line is ₦395.41 per person annually, which is two-thirds of the mean value of consumption. The lower poverty line is ₦197.71 per person annually, which is one-third of the mean value of consumption. If you fall under the lower poverty line you are considered extremely poor, while if you fall under the upper poverty line are considered moderately poor.Thus defined, the poverty line is less than the minimum wage of labor workers in 1985.

=== Vulnerability to poverty ===
People that are presently not in poverty and those currently in poverty are both considered 'vulnerable to poverty'. Household vulnerability is determined by the chances or risk that a household will either fall under the poverty line or if already poor, remain in poverty. If a household has 50% or more odds of falling into poverty or staying in poverty, they are considered to be vulnerable to poverty. The three groupings of vulnerability to poverty are the permanent poor due to temporary abnormal events occurring, those becoming poor because of predictable events, and those who become poor because of damage to the economy that affected the household's profits. The three main terminologies adopted to classify poverty are Vulnerability as Expected Poverty (VEP), Vulnerability as Low Expected Utility (VEU), and Vulnerability as Uninsured Exposure to Risk (VER). In Nigeria, those most at risk of poverty and financially insecure are widows (specifically ones without adult children), orphans, the physically challenged, and migrants. The likeliness of poverty in rural areas of Nigeria is higher with those of household characteristics such as the number of people living in a household, education level, and production. Another determining factor of vulnerability to poverty is food poverty, which is sometimes considered the root of all poverty. The vulnerability of food poverty varies across the urban/rural and geopolitical zones throughout Nigeria. Altogether, 61.68% of Nigerians are vulnerable to food poverty, so measures should be taken to increase food production and food distribution.

=== Child poverty ===
One of the terrible effects of Nigeria's poverty problems is the result of child poverty. A study made in 2001 from the Harmonized Nigeria Living Standard Survey (HNLSS) and the 2011 Multiple Indicator Cluster Survey (MICS) indicates that 23.22% of children are currently in extreme poverty and 70.31% of children in the country are in overall child poverty. Education, health, nutrition, water, and sanitation are classified as child deprivation in Nigeria. Similarly to the main concentrations of extreme poverty in Nigeria, the majority of child poverty takes place in rural areas rather than urban areas. Action was taken on this problem when rule switched to democratic to fight child poverty and deprivation from the Child Rights Act in 2003, which was intended to guarantee welfare and basic living standards for children in Nigeria. However, the fact that many children are still in poverty and are suffering, the Child Rights Act wasn't as successful as it seemed to be.

== Government programmes ==
There have been attempts at poverty alleviation, most notably with the following programmes:

- 1972: National Accelerated Food Production Programme and the Nigerian Agricultural and Co-operative Bank. "This was an agricultural extension programme by the Federal Department of Agriculture during General Yakubu Gowon's regime. The programme focused on bringing about a significant increase in the production of maize, cassava, rice and wheat in the Northern states through subsistent production within a short period of time."
- 1976: Operation Feed the Nation: "This programme evolved under the military regime of General Olusegun Obasanjo. The programme was launched in order to bring about increased food production in the entire nation through the active involvement and participation of everybody in every discipline thereby making every person capable of partly or wholly feeding him or herself". The program also seek to teach the rural farmers how to use modern farming tools.
- 1976: River Basin Development Authority: River Basin Development Decree was promulgated in 1976 to establish eleven River Basin Development Authorities. The initial aim of the authorities was to boost economic potentials of the existing water bodies particularly irrigation and fishery with hydroelectric power generation and domestic water supply as secondary objectives. The objective of the programme was later extended to other areas most important to production and rural infrastructural development.
- 1980: Green Revolution Programme: "Green Revolution was a programme inaugurated by Shehu Shagari in April 1980. The programme was aimed at increasing the production of food and raw materials in order to ensure food security and self-sufficiency in basic staples. Secondly, it aspired to boost production of livestock and fish in order to meet home and export needs and to expand and diversify the nation's foreign exchange earnings through production and processing of export crops".
- 1986: Directorate of Food, Roads and Rural Infrastructure (DFRRI): It was set up in February 1986 to bring aout a comprehensive food, roads and rural infrastructure development in Nigeria.
- 1990: National Fadama Development Project (NFDP): The first National Fadama Development Project (NFDP-1) was designed to promote simple low-cost improved irrigation technology under World Bank financing. "The project was started in 1990 and is now in its third phase". "It is a $450 million project and is being implemented in 36 states and Nigeria's Federal Capital Territory". "Phase I and Phase II of the project helped to raise the incomes of rural farmers by 63 percent". Fadama is the Hausa name for irrigable, low-lying plains underlain by "shallow" aquifers found along major river systems. "The Fadama concept is an old tradition in Hausa, where flooded land is used for growing a variety of crops and small-scale irrigation"."The main objective was to sustainably increase the incomes of the Fadama users through the expansion of farm and non-farm activities with high value-added output".
- 1993: The Nigerian Agricultural Land Development Authority (NALDA): The authority aims at giving strategic public support for land development, assisting and promoting better uses of Nigeria's rural land and their resources, boosting profitable employment opportunities for rural dwellers, raising the level/standard of living of rural people, targeting and assisting in achieving food security through self-reliance and sufficiency.
- 1993: Family Support Programme and the Family Economic Advancement Programme: "Makes provision for the establishment of an empowerment programme for locally based producers of goods and services and protentional entrepreneurs in cottage industries. Also sets forth eligibility criteria for loan facilities, and provides for loan recovery schedules under the programme".
- 2001: National Poverty Eradication Programme (NAPEP): to replace the previously failed Poverty Alleviation Program (PAP): Obasanjo introduced Poverty Alleviation Programme (PAP) in 2000 but later, PAP was halted and replaced with National Poverty Eradication Programme (NAPEP) in 2001. NAPEP has a multi-various approach to poverty eradication including Capacity Acquisition Programme (CAP) which is an emphasis on skills acquisition and training for self-reliance, Youth Empowerment Scheme (YES) which is concerned with providing unemployed youth opportunities in skills acquisitions, generating wealth and gaining employment, Mandatory Attachment Programme which is concerned with giving of credits and trade training and commerce, Rural Infrastructure Development which is concerned with ensuring all round improvement in rural developments and the Social Welfare Services Scheme (SOWESS) which concerned with providing social and welfare services for its benefactors.
- 2002: National, Special Programme on Food Security (NSPFS): This Programme was launched in all the 36 states of the federation during the Olusegun Obasanjo's regime. The broad objective of the programme was to increase food production and eliminate rural poverty
- 2003: Root And Tuber Expansion Programme (RTEP): RTEP was launched under Olusegun Obasanjo's administration. It covers 26 states and was designed to address the problem of food production and rural poverty. The programme was aimed at improving the cultivation of root and tuber crops by farmers to ensure food sustainability.
- 2011: Agricultural Transformation Agenda (ATA): It was launched with the aim of changing the perception about agriculture as a development issue instead of pure business. The aim of the agenda is to attract private investors in agriculture, increase value for locally produced goods, improve general conception about agriculture and also create jobs for its teaming youths and women in Nigeria.

== See also ==
- Economy of Nigeria
- Corruption in Nigeria
- List of countries by percentage of population living in poverty
- Poverty in Africa

== Bibliography ==
- Accounting for Poverty in Africa: Illustration with Survey Data from Nigeria, Working Papers, African Development Bank Group, 2012
- "African cities: Left behind", The Economist, UK, 17 September 2016. (Mostly about Nigeria)
