= Mr Funny =

Nigerian comedian

Sabinus
- Born: Emmanuel Chukwuemeka Ejekwu; 30 January 1995 (age 31)
- Education: University of Port Harcourt (UNIPORT)

Comedy career
- Years active: 2020–present
- Medium: Stand-up; film; television; Content Creator
- Genres: Observational comedy; Insult comedy; Satire
- Subjects: Nigerian Culture; Everyday life; Popular culture; Current events; Trick Comedy
- Other name: Oga Sabinus – Mumu Man – Investor Sabinus — Investor Blue Chief

YouTube information
- Channel: Oga Sabinus
- Years active: 2020–present
- Genre: Short skit
- Subscribers: 1.17 million
- Views: 216million
- Last updated: 14 May 2026

Emmanuel Chukwuemeka Ejekwu (born 30 January 1995), known as Mr Funny or Oga Sabinus, is a Nigerian comedian, content creator, actor and skit maker.

== Early life ==
Mr Funny was born on 30 January 1995 in Rivers State. He had his early education in Port Harcourt and went on to acquire his Bachelor's Degree in Linguistics and Communication Studies from the University of Port Harcourt.

== Career ==
Mr Funny's career started in 2015 but he began to see mainstream success in 2019. He was nominated in the 2021 maiden edition of The Humour Awards Academy alongside fellow comedian Basketmouth. Mr Funny discovered his comedy talent at a young age. He began actively doing comedy skits while he was in university. This was in 2015 during a particular School Student Union week. Mr Funny decided to pursue his career further by uploading various comedy skits on his social media handles, especially Instagram.

Soon enough, he started getting noticed by Nigerian top Instagram influencers who started sharing his skits and his followers on the platform grew. Mr. Funny broke into the comedy industry in 2019.

His popularity has earned some notable recognition. Oga Sabinus is the brand ambassador for a popular betting site: Oddstackr and many others. Some of his role models who have influenced him in his comedy career are Mr Ibu and Charles Inojie.

He won the Best Male Skit Maker category of the year in the Legit.ng Awards 2022. He was nominated alongside Funnybros, Mr Macaroni and Broda Shaggi.

Mr Funny has also featured in multiple Nollywood movies, the likes of 'Billionaire's Bride', 'Man of War' etc.

== Filmography ==
- Dead Serious (2024)

== Awards ==
Year	Award	Category	Result	Ref.
2021	DENSA Awards	The Creative Social Media	Won	
2022	Africa Magic Viewers' Choice Awards	Best Online Social Content Creator	Won	
