= I Go Dye =

Nigerian comedian (born 1979)

- Born: Francis Agoda; April 4, 1979 (age 46); Delta State, Nigeria
- Occupations: Comedian; Motivational Speaker; Social Crusader
- Years active: 1991–present

Francis Agoda (born April 4, 1979), better known by his stage name I Go Dye, is a Nigerian comedian, motivational speaker, and social advocate. He is best known for his performances as a stand-up comedian, which he drew from his experiences growing up in Warri, Nigeria. His performances are almost exclusively delivered in Nigerian pidgin. He has organised various international comedy shows, including I Go Dye Standing.

== Early life ==
Francis Agoda was born on April 4, 1979, in Abraka, Delta State, Nigeria. He became known for his creativity while still in elementary school at Ighogbadu Primary School and College of Commerce in Warri. His mother removed him from the United College of Commerce to study in Essi College, Warri. This was so that his uncle, who was a teacher in Essi College, could monitor his activities. While in Essi College, he joined SVC, where he met his best friend, Otagware Onodjeyeke (Ltas), now known as Igosave. In 1994, they started presenting mock news on Delta Broadcasting Service together, addressing issues affecting society.

== Career ==
Agoda got a contract as a stand-up comedian at the Prest Motel in Benin City, where he was paid one thousand Naira per show. He came up with the name I Go Dye from the similarity to the sound of his surname Agoda, I GO DYE, with the meaning "initiative guide" to developing better opportunities for youth and unprivileged people.

After years of exploring his creativity and expanding his profile across different events in Nigeria, he featured in the 2000 edition of Africa's biggest comedy show, Night of A Thousand Laughs. According to the marketer, Obino Music, he became the most saleable comedian in the franchise. After ten years, he was honoured by the producer, Opa Williams, as the most outstanding performer of the decade in Night of a Thousand Laughs.

In 2005 he undertook his first European tour, Golden Entertainment, with Ehi Zoya, performing in 7 countries. He later received an award at the 2016 UNESCO event in Abuja for his contributions towards the development of Nigeria.

He has been featured in the MTV Africa Music Awards. He has also performed in opening and closing shows of various notable musicians, including Akon, Boyz II Men, 50-Cent, Rick Ross, The Game, and Kelly Rowland. He performed at the 2018 National Council of Nigeria Traditional Rulers in Port Harcourt, before the Sultan of Sokoto Alhaji Sa'ad Abubakar III, the Ooni of Ife Adeyeye Enitan Ogunwusi, and other distinguished attendees. I Go Dye's personal comedy brand is I Go Dye Standing.

In 2016, he sold out 02 London to mark his 20 years on stage.

== Awards ==
I Go Dye has won various awards, including:

- African Best Comedian.
- The Nigerians in Diaspora Organisation of Europe-Spain Award for his contribution to Nigerian culture and art.
- The Nigeria Best Comedian Award.
- Delta Role model Award 2017
- Ukaid and youth alive foundation ambassador Award on #MadACT make a difference Against Corruption Today; dedicated to Nigerian pensioners
- Nigeria Army Civil Award with the compliments of Chief of Army Staff Lt General TY Buratai
- United Nations Development Goal Ambassador
- United Nations World Habitat Ambassador
- United Nations Peace Award

== Social crusader ==
He is a United Nations Millennium Development Goals Ambassador, working to actualise the United Nations' objectives.

I Go Dye's tragic experiences have made him an advocate for peace. He was shot at in a conflict and has lost some of his close friends. When he reflected on the 1997 Warri crisis between the Ijaw and Itsekiri people, he championed the project Peace in Sight. In 2004 he shot a 10-minute documentary for the United Nations and the Federal Government of Nigeria to promote peace and advocate for rural development.

In 2017 he wrote an open letter to mark the United Nations Youth Day, titled "Logic and Reason Without Guns", to the Nigerian Government, Governor's militia, and the youth. The same year, he advocated for new leadership for Nigeria in open letters to president Muhammadu Buhari and former vice president Atiku Abubakar. In particular, he is an advocate for African youth, promoting a new political ideology that will include them in governance. He has advocated for youth leadership in Zimbabwe, writing to president Robert Mugabe asking him to step down for more youthful leadership. He also successfully advocated for a youthful president in Liberia.
