= Basketmouth =

Nigerian Comedian

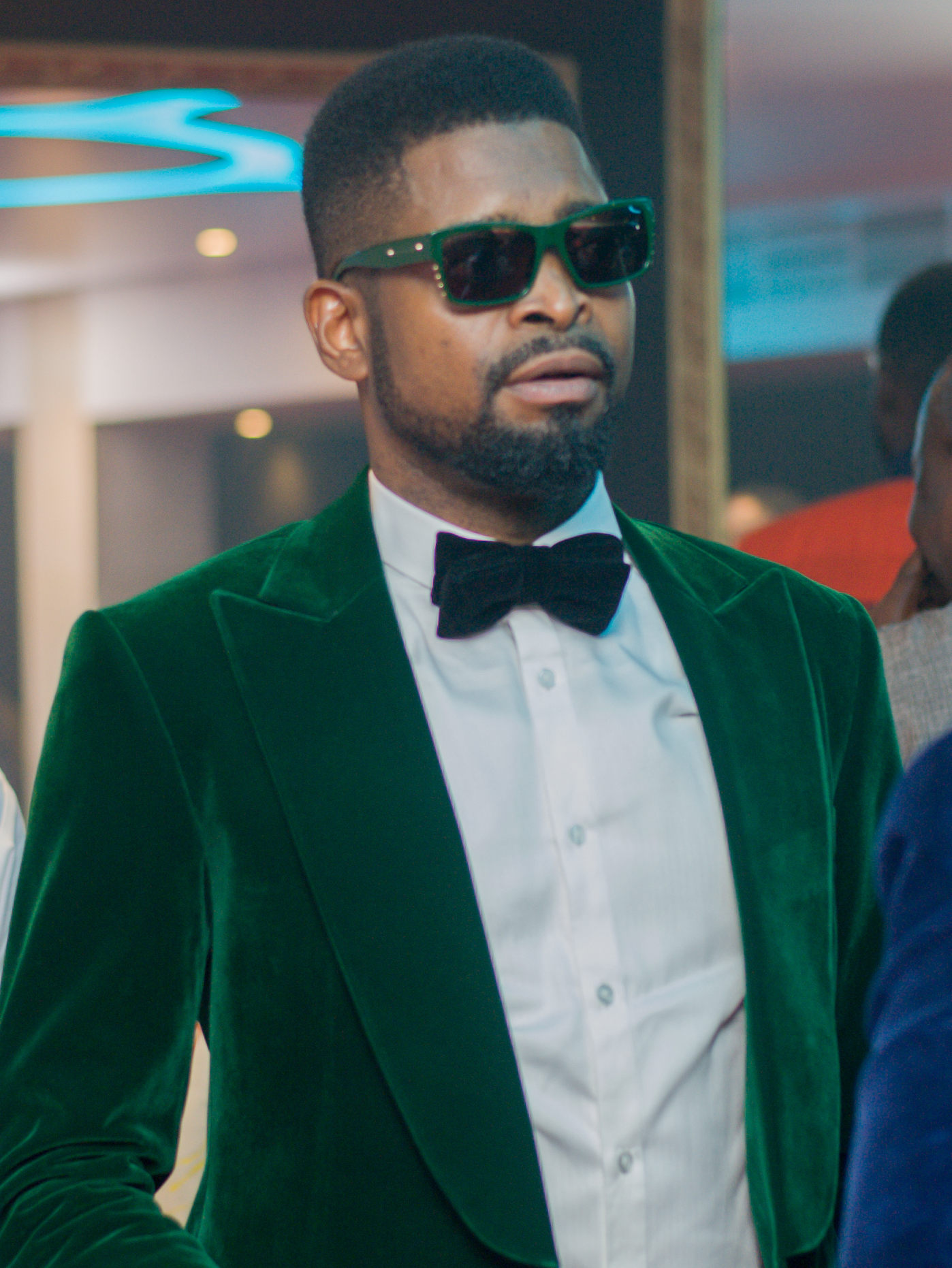
- Basketmouth at the AMVCAs 2020
- Born: Bright Okpocha; 14 September 1978 (age 48); Lagos State, Nigeria
- Education: University of Benin (UNIBEN)

Comedy career
- Years active: 2000–present
- Medium: Stand-up; film; television; music
- Genres: Observational comedy; Insult comedy; Satire; Self-deprecation
- Subjects: Nigeria Culture; everyday life; human sexuality; Popular culture; current events; Trick Comedy; Marriage
- Website: www.basketmouth.tv

Bright Okpocha (born 14 September 1978), better known by his stage name Basketmouth, is a Nigerian comedian and actor. He has organized popular stand-up comedy concerts like Basketmouth Uncensored across the globe.

Basketmouth hosted a comedy challenge on Instagram, called the #TwoThingsChallenge which sparked an uproar from fans, after a young fan posted a video of him saying obscene things relating to sex, with a child in close view in the video.

He was a producer of "Ghana Jollof".

== Biography ==
=== Early life ===
Bright Okpocha was born in Lagos State and is originally from Abia State, Nigeria. He completed his primary and secondary school education in Apapa, Lagos, before studying Sociology and Anthropology at the University of Benin, Edo State.

== Career ==
He discovered an interest in drumming in 1991 and began rapping in 1994. He formed a group called "Da Psychophats" with seven members, performing from 1995 until the group disbanded before releasing any recordings. He subsequently formed another rap group, "Da Oddz", with his brother Godwin and Muyiwa Ola-Phillips. The group performed at several shows but did not achieve a commercial breakthrough.

Okpocha subsequently transitioned from rap to stand-up comedy.

== Education ==
Okpocha completed his primary and secondary school education in Apapa, Lagos, before pursuing a degree in Sociology and Anthropology at the University of Benin.

== Appearances ==
- In 2000, Basketmouth appeared in Lagbaja's music video Gra Gra.
- In 2005 and 2006, Basketmouth won the National Comedy Award and the Best Stand-up Comedian of the Year award. He was nominated at the 2021 maiden edition of The Humour Awards alongside fellow comedian Mr Funny.
- Basketmouth appears in the Africa Magic series "My Flatmates" (2016).
- In 2018, Basketmouth hosted businessman Femi Otedola at his home.

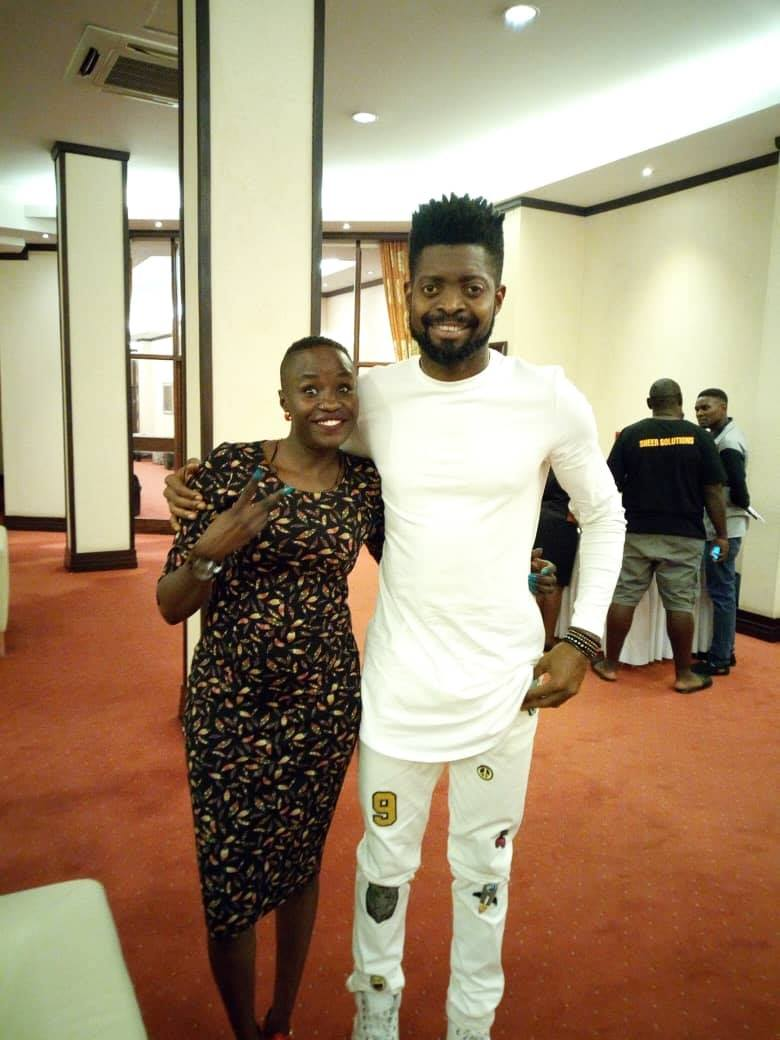
With Basketmouth

In December 2020, he launched a comedy web series titled "Papa Benji".

== Music ==
Okpocha launched a record label, Barons World Entertainment, in 2014.

He released a highlife album titled Yabasi as the soundtrack for Papa Benji in November 2020, featuring artists including Ladipoe, BOJ, The Cavemen, Bez, Waje, Duncan Mighty, Flavour and Phyno under Freeme Music.

In 2022, he released the album Horoscope, featuring Johnny Drille, Simi, M.I Abaga, Buju, Peruzzi, Oxlade, Reekado Banks, Falz, Magnito, Illbliss, Dremo, and Flavour.

In May and December 2022, he produced music for Aṣa and Adekunle Gold under Barons World Entertainment.

In 2023, Okpocha announced his third studio album, titled Uburu.

== Filmography ==
Okpocha produced and acted in a short film titled Confession of a Bandit.

In 2022, he appeared in the Nollywood film The Brotherhood alongside Falz, OC Ukeje and Tobi Bakre.

In 2024, his first feature film A Ghetto Love Story was released.

== Discography ==
=== Studio albums ===
- Yabasi (Onions) (2020)
- Horoscopes (2022)
- A Ghetto Love Story (2024)

== Personal life ==
In November 2010, Okpocha married Elsie in Lagos. They have three children. In December 2022, Okpocha announced via Instagram that he and his wife were divorcing after twelve years of marriage.

In 2010, he was listed as the second best comedian in Africa by MNET's Studio 53 Extra.

Okpocha has held endorsement deals with Globacom, Amstel Malta, Kia Motors and Dana Airlines.

== Awards and nominations ==
Year	Award	Category	Work	Result	Ref
2022	Africa Magic Viewers' Choice Awards	Best Africa Magic Original Comedy Series	My Flatmates	Nominated	

== See also ==
- List of Igbo people
- List of Nigerian comedians
