= Enioluwa Adeoluwa =

Nigerian influencer and actor

- Born: Enioluwa Prince Adeoluwa; 6 July 1999 (age 27); Akure, Ondo State, Nigeria.
- Other name: Beauty Boy
- Education: Ekiti State University; Pan-Atlantic University
- Occupations: Influencer; actor; director; producer; tv personality
- Years active: 2018–present
- Notable work: European Union; All of Us

TikTok information
- Page: Enioluwa Adeoluwa
- Followers: 3.6 million
- Last updated: June 5, 2025

Enioluwa Prince Adeoluwa (born July 6, 1999) is a Nigerian influencer, actor, director, film producer and television personality. He is best known for his work in fashion, lifestyle, and social media advocacy. He gained prominence for his content on platforms such as Instagram, TikTok and YouTube, where he discusses on fashion, grooming, and personal development. In 2022, he was a European Union African ambassador. He was included in Forbes 30 Under 30 Africa 2023 list. In 2024, he executive produced the web series All of Us, in which he played the lead role of Isaac.

== Early life ==
Adeoluwa was born on 6 July 1999, in Akure, Ondo State, Nigeria. For his primary education, he attended Cabataf primary school, then proceeded to Preston international school for his secondary education. He graduated from the Ekiti State University at the age of 19 with a first-class degree in media and theatre.

In December 2021, he earned a master's degree in marketing communication from the School of Media and Communication at Pan-Atlantic University and in January 2022, he revealed on his social media platforms that he has commenced his doctoral studies, pursuing a PhD.

== Career ==
=== 2018-2021: Career beginnings ===
Adeoluwa rose to fame as a social media influencer, leveraging platforms like Instagram and TikTok. He is one of Nigeria's most recognised digital creators.

In 2018, Adeoluwa directed a short film Haunting. In addition to his social media presence, Enioluwa has collaborated with various brands and participated in advertising campaigns promoting fashion, grooming, and youth empowerment. He is also known for his advocacy of self-confidence and personal growth.

=== 2022-present: Breakthrough with European Union and All of Us ===
In 2022, Adeoluwa was named the ambassador of European Union Africa. In 2023, he collaborated with Crocs as the first brand ambassador in Nigeria, Fenty Beauty and MAC Cosmetics. He was named to the Forbes 30 Under 30 Africa list along Anita Akide.

In 2024, he played the lead role of Isaac in All of Us and Queen Lateefah as a recurring cast. He is the executive producer of All of Us, a web series about high school students. He won the Africa Magic Viewers' Choice Awards for Best Dressed Male and Force of Virality at the Trendupp Awards. In 2025, he appeared in the television show A Lagos Love Story.

== Filmography ==
=== Film and television ===
Year	Title	Role	Ref
2018	Haunting	Director	
2024	Queen Lateefah	Recurring cast	
2024	All of Us	Isaac	
2025	A Lagos Love Story	Guest	
2026	Oversabi Aunty	Chika	

=== Music video ===
Year	Title	Artist	Role	Ref
2023	"My G"	Kizz Daniel	Self	

== Public image ==
Adeoluwa has been recognized for his impact on Nigerian youth and his ability to connect with his audience through his content. His work has earned him a reputation as a leading voice in the Nigerian digital space In a 2025 interview with Pulse Nigeria, he stated that he doesn't pay attention to online criticism and launched Eni's Book to encourage young people to read.

== Personal life ==
Some social media rumours have claimed that Adeoluwa is gay. In 2024, he stated publicly that he is not gay but a straight man who has a feminine appearance. Earlier in 2023, he clarified that Priscillia Ojo was his best friend, not his lover.

== Awards and nominations ==
Year	Association	Category	Nominated works	Result	Ref.
2022	The Guardian Life	Personality of the Year	Himself	Honoured	
2022	Trendupp Awards	Force of Virality	Himself	Won	
2023	Africa Magic Viewers Choice Awards	Best Dressed Male	Himself	Won	
2023	Forbes 30 Under 30	Highest Paid Nigerian Influencer	Himself	Honoured	
2023	Meta By Africa	Rising Star	Himself	Honoured	
2023	The Future Awards	Young Person of the Year	Himself	Nominated	
2023	Trendupp Awards	Force of Influence	Himself	Nominated	
2024	Eko Heritage Awards	Most Stylish Personality of the Year	Himself	Won	
2024	Trendupp Awards	Force of Instagram	Himself	Won	
2024	Trendupp Awards	Force of Influence	Himself	Nominated	
2025	Trendupp Awards	Force of Influence	Himself	Nominated	
