= 2026 Africa Magic Viewers' Choice Awards =

2026 film award in Nigeria

12th Africa Magic Viewers' Choice Awards
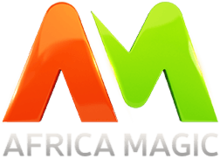
- The Logo of African Magic
- Date: 9 May 2026
- Hosted by: Bovi & Nomzamo Mbatha
- Organized by: Africa Magic

Highlights
- Best Film: My Father’s Shadow
- Best Direction: Akinola Davies Jr; My Father’s Shadow
- Best Actor: Uzor Arukwe; Colours of Fire
- Best Actress: Linda Ejiofor; The Serpent’s Gift

The 12th Africa Magic Viewers' Choice Awards was held on 9 May 2026 at the Eko Hotels and Suites in Lagos, Nigeria. Honouring the best in African film and TV, the award features 32 categories (18 jury-decided and 11 public-voted) and two new categories for North and Central African indigenous language films. The ceremony was televised by DStv and GOtv across all Africa Magic Channels and hosted by Bovi and Nomzamo Mbatha. The awards were sponsored by Don Julio.

== Nominees and winners ==
Winners are listed first and highlighted in bold.

Best Overall Movie	Best Director
**My Father's Shadow**; Gingerrr; The Herd; 3 Cold Dishes; The Serpent's Gift; Behind The Scenes	**Akinola Davies Jr. - My Father's Shadow**; Tunde Kelani – Cordelia; James Omokwe – Osamede; Daniel Etim Effiong – The Herd; Yemi Filmboy Morafa – Gingerrr; Asurf Amuwa Oluseyi – 3 Cold Dishes
Best Lead Actor	Best Lead Actress
**Uzor Arukwe – Colours Of Fire**; Mike Ezuruonye – Oversabi Aunty; Lateef Adedimeji – Lisabi: A Legend Is Born; William Benson – To Kill A Monkey; Kanayo O. Kanayo – Grandpa Must Obey; Khumbuza Meyiwa – Bet I Love You; Wale Ojo – 3 Cold Dishes; Femi Branch – Red Circle	**Linda Ejiofor – The Serpent's Gift**; Bimbo Akintola – To Kill A Monkey; Ifeoma Fafunwa – The Lost Days; Ariyike Owolagba – Something About The Briggs; Sola Sobowale – Her Excellency; Scarlet Gomez – Behind The Scenes; Genoveva Umeh – The Herd; Gloria Anozie-Young – Mother Of The Brides
Best Supporting Actor	Best Supporting Actress
**Bucci Franklin – To Kill A Monkey**; Simileoluwa Hassan – The Yard; Lateef Adedimeji – Gingerrr; Gabriel Afolayan – Colours Of Fire; Femi Adebayo – King Of Thieves 2; Lateef Adedimeji – Red Circle; Femi Branch – Owambe Thieves; Uzor Arukwe – Behind The Scenes	**Linda Ejiofor – The Herd**; Olamide Kidbaby – Oversabi Aunty; Bisola Aiyeola – Gingerrr; Sola Sobowale – The Covenant; Nadia Dutch – Aljana; Amal Umar – The Herd; Juliebrenda Nyambura – MTV Shuga Mashariki; Funke Akindele – Behind The Scenes
Best Indigenous Language Film (West Africa)	Best Indigenous Language Film (East Africa)
**Lisabi: A Legend Is Born**; The Serpent's Gift; Labake Olododo; Olorisha; Aljana	**Addis Fikir**; Inside Job; Sayari; My Son; Kimote
Best Indigenous Language Film (South Africa)	Best Indigenous Language Film (North Africa)
**Tlhaho Ya Mosadi**; Bet I Love You; Sebata: The Beast; Ben Made It; Terra Of Queens And Kuma 2	**Artal Alhanin: Our Memories**; The Omnipresent; The Delivery; The Hidden Voice; This Is Portsaid
Best Indigenous Language Film (Central Africa)	Best Short Film
**Mabanda**; Safou: A Gift From Nature; Golden Spoon	**Hussaini**; Fleas; Rise; Telephone; My Body, God's Temple
Best Writing in a Movie	Best Documentary
**Wale Davies – My Father's Shadow**; Lani Aisida – The Herd; Ikenna Okpara – Blackout; Shirleen Wangari – Cards On The Table; Xavier Ighorodje – Gingerrr; Isaac Ayodeji – Suky; Tomi Adesina – 3 Cold Dishes	**Beyond Olympic Glory**; The Good, The Bad of Afrobeat; The People Shall; Not Addressing This Anymore; BOU
Best Cinematography	Best Editing
**Jermaine Edwards – My Father's Shadow**; Kabelo Thathe – To Kill A Monkey; Emmanuel Igbekele – The Herd; Daanong Gyang – Finding Nina; Emmanuel Igbekele – The Serpent's Gift; KC Obiajulu – Stitches; Emmanuel Igbekele – Gingerrr	**Daniel Anyiam – To Kill A Monkey**; Kazeem Agboola – Cordelia; Omar Guzman Castro – My Father's Shadow; Wanguma Peter Chidebere, Dele Doherty – Landline; Asurf Amuwa Oluseyi – 3 Cold Dishes; Winston Aig-Ohioma – Osamede
Best Sound Design	Best Music Score
**Pius Fatoke, CJ Mirra – My Father's Shadow**; Tolu Obanro – Gingerrr; Vaughan Phillips – Ben Made It; Tolu Obanro – The Party; Vaughan Phillips – Sebata: The Beast; Fisayo Adefolaju – The Herd	**Duval Timothy, CJ Mirra – My Father's Shadow**; Nissi Ogulu – 3 Cold Dishes; Chubb Okobah – Osamede; Tolu Obanro – Gingerrr; Tolu Obanro – The Party; Sofresh – MTV Shuga Mashariki; Oscar Heman-Ackah – To Kill A Monkey
Best Art Direction	Best Makeup
**Ajamolaya Bunmi – Colours Of Fire**; Zainab Oladipupo – The Serpent's Gift; Omolade Abisola – The Herd; Olatunji Afolayan, Gideon Stephen – Aljana; Victor Akpan – Suky; Thabiso Senne – Inimba	**Hakeem Effect – Warlord**; Mojisola Imam – Behind The Scenes; Adeola Bamgboye – Lisabi: A Legend Is Born; Dablaq Artistry – Gingerrr; Adeola Bamgboye – Abanisete; Ruth Harcourt – Suky; Adeola Bamgboye – Labake Olododo
Best Art Direction	Best Music Score
**Ajamolaya Bunmi – Colours Of Fire**; Zainab Oladipupo – The Serpent's Gift; Omolade Abisola – The Herd; Olatunji Afolayan, Gideon Stephen – Aljana; Victor Akpan – Suky; Thabiso Senne – Inimba	**Hakeem Effect – Warlord**; Mojisola Imam – Behind The Scenes; Adeola Bamgboye – Lisabi: A Legend Is Born; Dablaq Artistry – Gingerrr; Adeola Bamgboye – Abanisete; Ruth Harcourt – Suky; Adeola Bamgboye – Labake Olododo
Best Scripted Series	Best Unscripted M-Net Original
**Inimba**; To Kill A Monkey; The Yard; The Chocolate Empire; Kash Money	**Nigerian Idol (S10)**; The Real Housewives Of Lagos Season 3; Ultimate Girls Trip: Africa; Offair With Gbemi And Toolz; Out N' About (Harar)
Best Writing TV Series	Best Scripted M-Net Original
**Annette Shadeya, Natasha Likimani, Mkamzee Mwatela, Arnold Mwanjila, Makgano Mamabolo – MTV Shuga Mashariki**; Donald Tombia, Timendu Aghahowa, Chiemeka Osuagwu – The Wives; Xavier Ighorodje – Our Husband; Besufekade Mulu – Addis Fikir; Temilola Balogun – Baba Oh; Stephen Okonkwo – The Party; Yednekachew Ayne – Gizat	**The Low Priest – Femi D. Ogunsanwo**; Adam to Eve – Lizz Njagah and Alexandros Konstantaras; Mother of the Brides – Rogba Arimoro and Bio Arimoro; The Yard – James Kalu Omokwe; Bobo – Maurice Muendo
Best Indigenous M-Net Original	Best Digital Content Creator
**Inimba**; Kukoyi; Undugu; Out N' About (Harar); Kampala Creme; The Chocolate Empire; Mgbuka	**Emmanuel Kanaga, Sophia Chisom**; Elozonam Ogbolu, Genoveva Umeh; Akwaman; Destiny Ogie Osarewinda; Benedict Ehimare Oriaifo; Taaooma; Steve Chuks

=== Other awards ===
- **Trailblazer Award** – Uche Montana
- **Industry Merit Award** – Sola Sobowale & Kanayo O. Kanayo

=== Gallary ===
Photos from the 12th edition of the AMCA 2026.

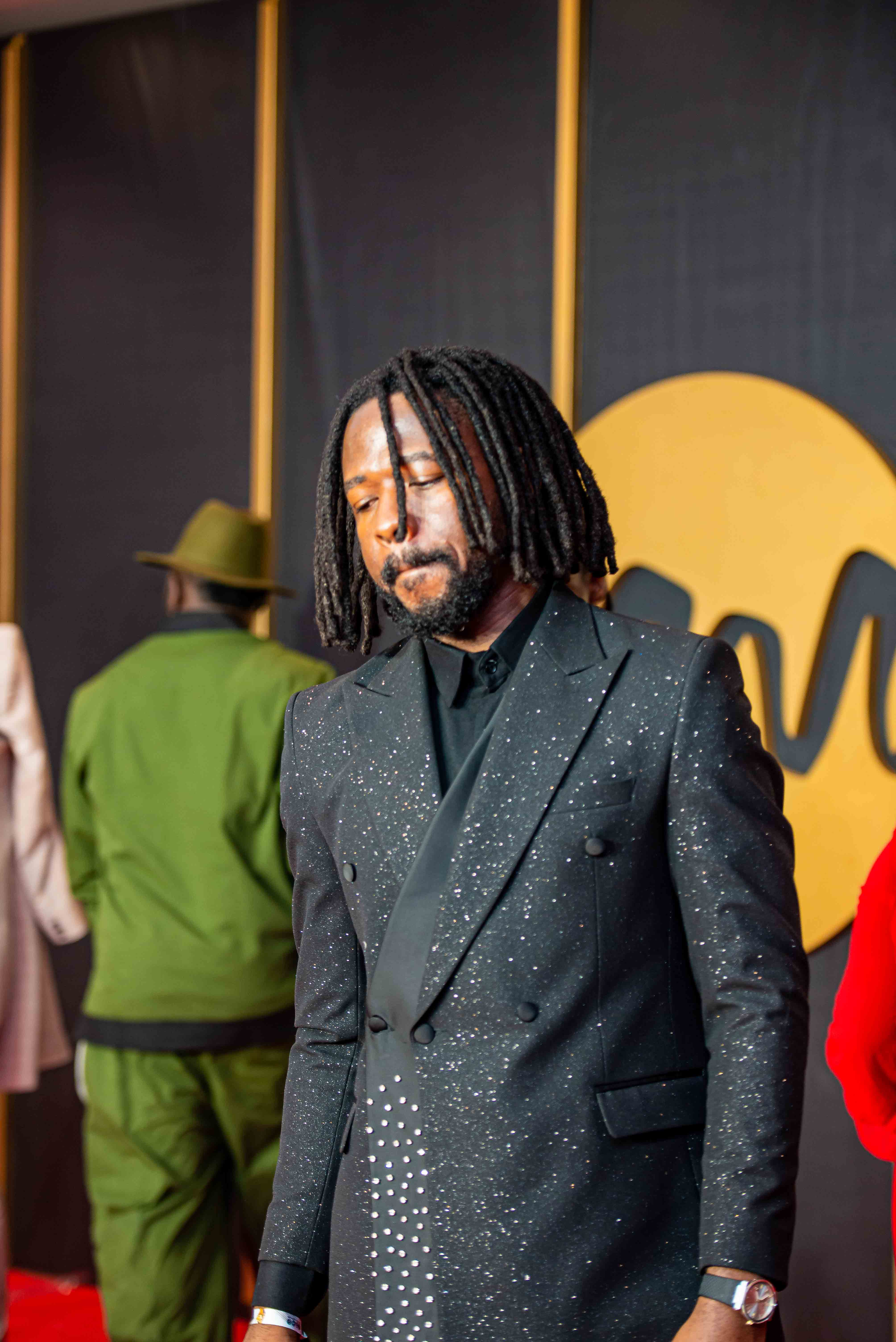
