= Kidbaby =

Nigerian comedian and actress

- Born: Salman Aliyat Olamide; March 3, 2002 (age 24); Ijebu Ode, Nigeria
- Other name: Eyinju Oluwa
- Occupations: Film maker; content creator; Internet personality; actress
- Years active: 2021–present
- Spouse: Rybeena (m. 2024)

Instagram information
- Page: Aliyat Olamide
- Years active: 2021–present
- Followers: 1.4 million

TikTok information
- Page: kidbaby
- Years active: 2021–present
- Genres: Comedy; lifestyle; fashion
- Followers: 4.1 million

YouTube information
- Channel: KidBaby101 Tv
- Years active: 2022–present
- Genres: Comedy; Film
- Subscribers: 204 thousand
- Views: 18.5 million
- Last updated: 15 August 2026

Salman Aliyat Olamide (born March 3, 2002) known professionally as Kidbaby or by her online pseudonym Kidbaby101 is a Nigerian content creator, comedienne, actress, TikToker, philanthropist, YouTuber and filmmaker. She first gained public attention through comedy videos on social media, where she became known for sketches featuring a childlike voice. After several small roles, she starred as Tope in the comedy-drama film Oversabi Aunty (2025), a breakthrough for which she received a nomination for Best Supporting Actress at the 2026 Africa Magic Viewers' Choice Awards.

Olamide garnered further recognition for playing younger version of character Adikaka in Ìyálóde (2025), Alakada: Bad and Boujee (2024), and for her lead roles in The Fool Detectives (2025).

== Early life and education ==
Salman Aliyat Olamide was born on March 3, 2002 in Ijebu Ode, Nigeria into a Muslim family. She attended Advance Nursery and Primary School and Ansar-Ud-Deen Senior High School. Her father was involved in a accident in 2010, which affected the family's financial situation.

In an interview with Ebuka Obi-Uchendu on Channels Television, Salman stated that she started using her "Child like voice" around when she was six years old. While in secondary school, she took part in drama clubs and was influenced by Helen Paul, whose use of character and comedy later inspired her to develop her own character.

In 2022, she worked in a bar while raising money for her Higher National Diploma (HND) programme. She graduated from Gateway Polytechnic, where she studied Mass Communication.

== Career ==
Kidbaby’s career began after a friend posted a video of her mimicking a childlike voice on TikTok. The video went viral on social media in 2020, drawing attention to her style.

She was encouraged by her boyfriend to create content on TikTok and later opened her own account in 2022, where she began posting comedy sketches featuring the voice and character. She later appeared in videos with other Nigerian comedians and content creators, including Broda Shaggi, Layi Wasabi, Oluwadolarz and Steve Chucks.

Kidbaby made her film debut as Aduke in Alakada: Bad and Boujee in 2024. and Young Adikaka in Ìyálóde.

In January 2025, She made her directorial debut as the producer of Adetutu, which premiered in January 29 2025. Also that same year she produced the film The Fool Detectives Where she also played the character Pablo. On 4 September 2025, Kidbaby appeared on the live television programme Entertainment Splash on TVC. Kidbaby starred in the Nollywood film Oversabi Aunty in December 2025. Kidbaby earned her first award nomination at the 2025 Trendupp Awards in the Emerging Force category. She was also honoured with the Honorary Award for Youth in Creativity at the Black History and Lifestyle Awards. At the 2025 MOI Awards in October, she was nominated for Content Creator of the Year. In November 2025, Kidbaby starred in Radio series Ajo Circle, a BellaNaija stop #StopHPVforHer campaign opposite Opeoluwa Keshinro. The series was produce by Temi Balogun.

In 2026, Kidbaby received a nomination for Best Supporting Actress at the 2026 Africa Magic Viewers’ Choice Awards (AMVCA) for her performance in Oversabi Aunty. That same year, She received a local honor from the City of Brampton, Canada, presented by Patrick Brown on behalf of the Brampton City Council. In July 2026, Kidbaby performed alongside Kenny Blaq as a headliner in live comedy show "The Oxymoron of Kenny Blaq". at the Eko Convention Centre, Eko Hotels & Suites, Victoria Island, Lagos, Nigeria.

==== Upcoming projects ====
Kidbaby is set to portray Minah in Toyin Abraham upcoming film Bestie, alongside Kunle Remi Pete Edochie, Sola Sobowale, and Reminisce.

== Social media influence and philanthropy ==
Kidbaby took part in community outreach initiatives through a partnership with the Lagos Food Bank Initiative. As part of the collaboration, she took part in programmes aimed at supporting vulnerable households and raising awareness of food insecurity. She has stated that the partnership reflects her interest in using her public platform to support humanitarian causes and encourage community involvement. In December 2025, she was featured alongside digital creator Trench Boy in Coca-Cola’s #ShareACoke campaign commercial. In 2026, she appeared on the cover of the 14th issue of EscapeMag alongside singer Qing Madi.

== Personal life ==
Olamide is married to Nigerian singer Rybeena. The couple married in a traditional ceremony in November 2024.

== Discography ==
Kidbaby released a song called "Box 18" (2024) featuring her husband.

=== Singles ===
Title	Year	Album
"Box 18"	2024	Non-album single

== Filmography ==
Key
†	Denotes productions that have not yet been released

=== Film ===
Year	Title	Role
2024	The Little Things	Custumier
2024	Alakada: Bad and Boujee	Aduke
2025	Ìyálóde	Young Adikaka
2025	Oversabi Aunty	Tope
2025	Adetutu	Adetutu
2025	The Fool Detectives	Pablo
2026	Bestie †	Minah

=== Television ===
Year	Title	Role
2024	TVC Entertainment Splash (E-Splash)	Herself
2026	High School Wacko	Bolly Choco

=== Radio series ===
Year	Title	Note
2025	Ajo Circle	BellaNaija Radio drama

=== Music videos ===
Year	Title	Performer(s)
2026	"Take Away"	Ayo Maff, Naira Marley

== Awards and nominations ==
Year	Award	Category	Result	Ref.
2025	Black History and Lifestyle Awards	Honorary award for youth in creativity	Honoured	
2025	Trendupp Awards	Emerging Force	Nominated	
2025	MOI Awards	Content Creator of the Year	Nominated	
2026	City of Brampton	Certificate of Recognition	Honoured	
2026	YouTube Creator Award	Silver Creator Award	Won	
2026	Africa Magic Viewers' Choice Awards	Best Supporting Actress	Nominated	
