= African Creators Summit =

Annual pan-African conference

- Status: Active
- Venue: Balmoral Event Centre, Federal Palace Hotel, Lagos Island
- Locations: Lagos, Lagos State, Nigeria
- Country: Nigeria
- Inaugurated: 2023
- Website: http://africancreatorssummit.com/

African Creators Summit is the first pan-African summit for creatives across different sectors. It is a yearly conference held with its first edition held in Lagos State, Nigeria.

== History ==
The African Creators Summit was founded in 2023. It was founded by Oladapo Adewunmi and Unique Kings Obi. It is a gathering of African creatives across different sectors. It held its first conference on 25 and 26 January at Balmoral Event Centre, Federal Palace Hotel, Lagos State, Nigeria. It had over 1,000 creators from all across Africa.

The summit was anchored by Nigerian comedian Laisisi Elenu and Kie Kie. The speakers included Aproko Doctor, Real warripikin, Daddy Freeze, Mark Angel, Omowunmi Akinnifesi among others.
