= Ìyálóde (film) =

- Directed by: Adebayo Tijani
- Produced by: Toyin Abraham
- Production company: Toyin Abraham Productions
- Distributed by: FilmOne Distributions
- Release date: June 6, 2025 (Nigeria)
- Running time: 117 minutes
- Country: Nigeria
- Language: Yoruba

Ìyálóde is a 2025 Nigerian Yoruba-language historical drama film directed by Adebayo Tijani and produced by Toyin Abraham in association with FilmOne Studios. It features an ensemble cast that includes Toyin Abraham alongside Muyiwa Ademola, Kareem Adepoju, Gabriel Afolayan, Kehinde Bankole, Ibrahim Chatta, Bukky Wright, Aisha Lawal, Peju Ogunmola, Wale Ojo and Peter Fatomilola. Set in a pre-colonial Yoruba kingdom, Ìyálóde follows a woman whose rise to political and military leadership challenges. The film was released theatrically in Nigeria on 6 June 2025.

== Premise ==
In the fictional Yoruba kingdom of Kulende, Asabi Onile is a respected warrior whose courage and leadership place her at the centre of a struggle over the kingdom's future. As competing factions vie for influence, longstanding traditions, political rivalries and personal ambitions bring instability to the kingdom. Following an act of betrayal that alters the course of her life, Asabi embarks on a quest for justice and redemption while confronting those responsible for her downfall. Her efforts bring her into conflict with influential figures determined to preserve the existing balance of power, leading to battles that test her loyalty, resilience and resolve.

As the conflict intensifies, questions of succession, honour and leadership divide the people of Kulende. Supported by allies but opposed by powerful rivals, Asabi challenges conventions surrounding authority and the role of women in the kingdom. Her actions ultimately shape the fate of Kulende and the legacy of the title of Ìyálóde.

== Cast ==
- Toyin Abraham as Asabi Onile
- Muyiwa Ademola
- Kareem Adepoju
- Gabriel Afolayan
- Kehinde Bankole
- Ibrahim Chatta
- Bukky Wright
- Aisha Lawal
- Peju Ogunmola
- Wale Ojo
- Salman Olamide as Young Adikaka
- Kola Ajeyemi
- Toyosi Adesanya
- Joke Muyiwa
- Peter Fatomilola

== Release ==
On January 2025, Toyin Abraham announced the release date for Ìyálóde to be June, which was to coincide with the Eid al-Adha holiday season. The film premiered in Lagos on June 6 2025. was also released in some Canadian cinemas.

== Reception ==
=== Box office ===
Ìyálóde debuted at number one in Nigeria's box office chart, earning ₦103.7 million on its opening weekend. After the first week of release in the theaters, the movie managed to earn a total gross of ₦137.4 million. After two weekends in theaters, it maintained the first position by earning an astounding gross of ₦200 million, even in the presence of other foreign films such as Ballerina in theaters. In three weeks in theaters, the movie earned a total gross of ₦231 million, and after five weeks in theaters, it had earned ₦292.8 million. The film grossed approximately ₦306 million at the Nigerian box office, making it one of the country's highest-grossing domestic releases of 2025 according to FilmOne Entertainment's year-end rankings.

Critical response

Seyi Lasisi of MyMovieViews described the film as an ambitious historical epic that drew on Yoruba culture and mythology. He praised the performances of Toyin Abraham and veteran actress Peju Ogunmola, as well as the film's costumes and production design. However, he found that inconsistent pacing, uneven visual effects and shortcomings in the screenplay prevented the film from fully realizing its potential. Olayode Oyo of TheRadar gave the film a largely negative assessment, criticising its screenplay, narrative structure and technical presentation. He argued that the film suffered from poor sound mixing and weak picture quality, while also describing the plot as underdeveloped despite its large ensemble cast. Oyo nevertheless acknowledged Toyin Abraham's ability as an actress, suggesting that her performance was among the film's stronger elements. Reviewing the film for NollyCritic, Shalom Obisesan wrote that Ìyálóde presented an engaging premise centred on legacy, sacrifice and female leadership, but concluded that these ideas were undermined by technical shortcomings. She praised Abraham's performance, Peju Ogunmola's supporting role and several action sequences, while criticising the film's editing, sound design, visual effects, pacing and production design. Obisesan awarded the film 2.5 out of 5 stars. Reviewing the film for Kemi Filani, Apegg Adeneyo described Ìyálóde as a recommendable historical drama, praising its performances, costume design, make-up, sound design and use of special effects. He also commended several battle sequences and the film's incorporation of Yoruba mythology, although he criticised aspects of the costume design, colour grading and the choreography of some fight scenes. Adeneyo rated the film 7.5 out of 10.
