= Ronke Odusanya =

Nigerian actress and (born 1973)

- Born: Ronke Odusanya; 3 May 1979 (age 47); Ogun State, Nigeria
- Education: Federal Government Girls College, Akure
- Occupations: Actress film producer performer
- Years active: 2000-present
- Notable work: Jenifa (2008); Astray (Isina) (2016); A Girl's Note (2016)
- Website: Twitter - Ronkeodusanya, Instagram - Ronkeodusanya, Youtube - Ronnies TV

Ronke Odusanya, (born 3 May 1979) is a Nigerian Yoruba-language film actress, film producer and stage performer.

== Early life ==
Ronke Odusanya was born on 3 May 1979 in Ogun State, Nigeria.

== Education ==
Odusanya began her education at the St. Benedict Nursery & Primary School and went on to Federal Government Girls College, Akure. She attended Olabisi Onabanjo University, earning a degree in Mass communication.

== Career ==
She began her professional acting career at 16 years old after graduation. She was named "Flakky Idi Dowo" after her role in Fathia Balogun's movie as "Folake" in 2006. Odusanya is featured in Oga Bello's "Kerikeri". She made her Nollywood debut feature in the 2001 Yoruba film Baba Ologba. She has featured in several Nigerian films, including ''Jenifa which she played the role of Becky, Twisted, A Girl's Note Introducing the Kujus where she played the role of Maupe, which is available on streaming platform prime videos, and among others. She was nominated for Best Actress in Leading Role (Yoruba) at 2017 Best of Nollywood Awards for her role in the film Ailatunse, also Best Yoruba Movie AMVCA 2020 nomination for the movie Ajoji godogbo

== Selected filmography ==
- Baba Ologba (2001)
- Twisted (2007) as Titi
- Jenifa (2008) as Becky
- Láròdá òjò (2008) as Jummy
- Eekan soso (2009)
- Emi Nire Kan (2009)
- Astray (Isina) (2016) as Keji
- Gangan (2016) as Setemi
- A Girl's Note (2016) as Mother
- Asake Oni Bread (2016)
- The Stunt (2017)
- Ayomide (2017)
- Obsession (2017)
- Flakky Ijaya (2017) as Flakky
- Jail (2017) as Ada
- Olorire (2018)
- The Eve (2018) as Aunty Keh
- Oronro (2018) as Bisoye
- Omije Omorewa
- Introducing The Kujus (2020) as Maupe
- Ainiwa (2021) as Bolajoko
- The Cokers (2021) as Mama Aderonke
- Sparrow (2021) as Eniola
- Body bag (2020) as Jumai
- Different Strokes (2022) as Dolapo
- Love or Death (2022) as Shindara
- Nkan Inu Igi (2022) as Shade
- Love Trap (2022) as Bisola
- Onika (2022) as Tumininu Aunt
- Love in a Pandemic (2023) as Aby
- The Kujus Again (2023) as Maupe
- World Famous (2023) as DPO
- Double Dekoi (2023) as Orogbo
- Alakada: Bad and Boujee (2024)
- Seven Doors (2024)

== Awards ==
Year	Award	Category	Film	Result	Ref
2017	Best of Nollywood Awards	Best Actress in Leading Role (Yoruba)	Ailatunse	Nominated	
2022	Best Yoruba Movie AMVCA	Best Actress in Leading Role (Yoruba)	Ajoji Godogodo	Nominated	

== See also ==
- List of Yoruba people
- List of Nigerian actresses
