= Yhemolee =

Nigerian singer, actor, and social media personality

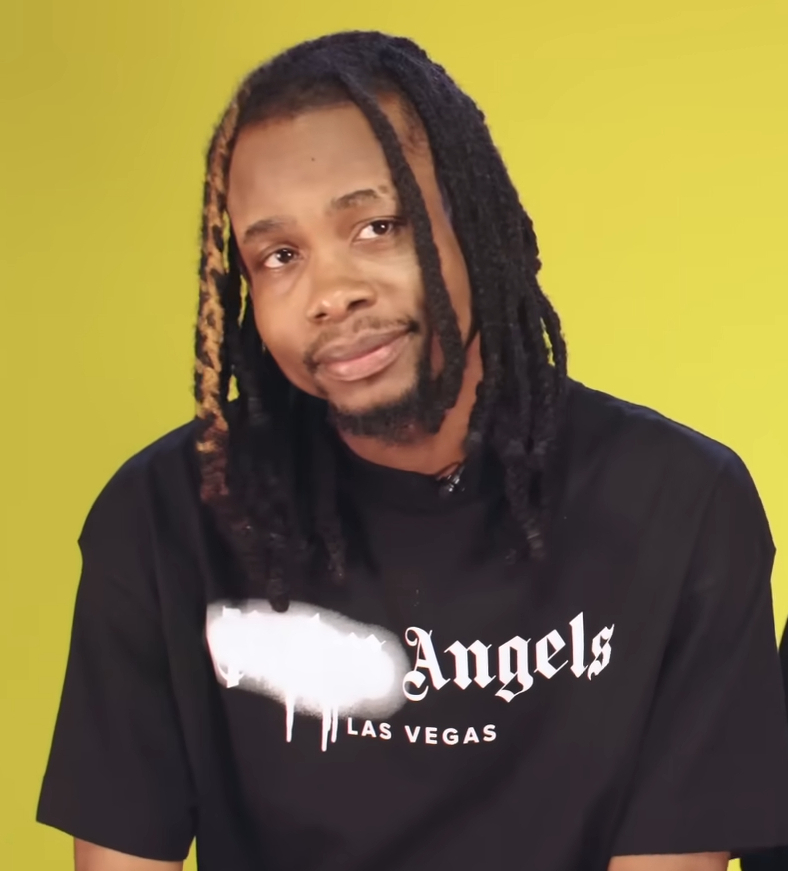
- Born: Idowu Adeyemi; 4 April 1993 (age 33); Lagos State, Nigeria.
- Other names: Olowo Eko; YL
- Education: Obafemi Awolowo University (B.P.A)
- Occupations: Actor; media personality; model; Musician
- Years active: 2018–present
- Musical career
- Genre: Afrobeats
- Instruments: Vocals

Idowu Adeyemi (born 4 April 1993), known professionally as Yhemolee is a Nigerian social media personality, singer and actor. Known for his work in a diverse range of films, he is the recipient of numerous accolades including an City People Entertainment Awards, a Trendupp Award, in addition to nominations for three City People Entertainment Awards.

Adeyemi began his career as a singer, with the release of his single "Mon Cheri" featuring Chinko Ekun and Asake. He made his film debut in the film Traffic and appeared in Bimbo Ademoye's comedy series Sibe. Adeyemi came to national attention with the supporting role as Muri Toronto in Jadesola Osiberu's thriller crime film Gangs of Lagos (2023). He gained further recognition for his supporting roles in films Hotel Labamba (2023) and in FilmOne Studios's films Alakada: Bad and Boujee (2024), as well as for portraying Tega in the film A Very Dirty Christmas (2025).

== Early life and career ==
Idowu Adeyemi was born on April 4, 1993, in Osun State, and grew up in Lagos State, Nigeria. He grew up with his sibings, and has a sister name Tiwa. According to an interview with Chude Jideonwo in 2023, Adeyemi stated that, as a result of his father's job his parents had to divorce when he was young. Following his parents’ separation, he supported himself through school.

I saw myself and my sister through school. They [our parents] separated at a point when they could have damaged our lives

Adeyemi attended Obafemi Awolowo University (OAU). Which was also attended by Asake, where he was friends with Blaqbonez, Cheque and Fireboy DML. During his time at the university, he was actively involved in various entertainment activities.

After graduating from OAU, Yhemolee continued to produce skits and host events. He moved on to work as an on-air personality at city FM. In 2020 he gained prominence as became one of the faces of the Lagos nightlife scene. That same year, he began releasing music and collaborated with Chinko Ekun and Asake on the single "Mon Cheri". In 2020, he won Best Collabo of the Year at the City People Entertainment Awards, organized by City People Magazine, for the song, and also received nominations for Comedy Act of the Year, Street Music of the Year and Popular Song of the Year.

In 2022, Yhemolee made his acting debut in the television film Traffic, and Reach. He followed with his role on the series— IjeBaby Chopping Center in which he played CK. He released his debut extended play Olowo Eko on December 20, 2022 under DK Records.

Yhemolee co-starred as Muri Toronto, in the film Gang of Lagos (2023). And also appeared in the film Hotel Labamba (2023). In 2024, he starred as Alaba Dollar, in the FilmOne Studios film Alakada: Bad and Boujee (2024) Later that year, he won a Trendupp Award for The Force of Online Sensation category.

In 2025, he starred in the holiday film A Very Dirty Christmas, opposite Ini Edo and Waje.

== Influence and controversies ==
In October 2024, Yhemolee signed an endorsement deal with Fashion brand – Luxury by Shizz, a Nigeria-based fashion brand. In June 2022, he became an official brand ambassador for the sports-betting brand bet9ja. Yhemolee has been credited with introducing Nigerian singer Asake to rapper Olamide. leading to his signing with Olamide's YBNL record label, which contributed to his rise in the Nigerian music industry, in an interview with Chude Jideonwo.

=== Controversies ===
On 27 November 2023, he was accused of assault by the singer in a series of statements on Lil Frosh's social media, the posts featured pictures. On 28 November 2023, Yhemolee filed a ₦200 million defamation suit against Lil Frosh.

Yhemolee became involved in a feud with Nigerians, social activist VeryDarkMan, and comedian Carter Efe, As they took to social media to exchange insults. The feud began when VeryDarkMan commented on Yhemolee's public breakup with his girlfriend, which was accompanied by allegations of infidelity.

In February 2024, Yhemolee faced accusations of cyberbullying footballer Alex Iwobi after the Super Eagles' loss to Ivory Coast in the 2023 AFCON final. The controversy began when sports journalist Pooja claimed that Yhemolee posted a video criticizing Iwobi's lifestyle, suggesting it was not in line with that of a serious football player. Shortly after this post, Iwobi deleted all his Instagram photos, which led to speculation that the video contributed to his decision. Yhemolee defended himself, stating that Pooja had twisted the narrative. He claimed that he merely reposted content created by someone else and denied any intent to harm Iwobi.

== Personal life ==
On 6 September 2024, Yhemolee married his long-term partner, Oyin Tayo (Thayour B), in Victoria Island, Lagos. The event was attended by guests including Timi Dakolo, Zlatan, Rahaman Jago, Poco Lee, and Soso Soberekon. He has a son: Amirion Idowu (born January 2025).

== Discography ==
=== Songs ===
- Mon Cheri ft. (Asake, Chinko Ekun, and Ashidapo) (2020)
- All the Girls ft. (Dandizzy, YKB) (2020)

=== EPs ===
- Olowo Eko

== Filmography ==
=== Television ===
Year	Title	Role	Ref
2022–	IjeBaby Chopping Center	CK	
2023–	Sibe	Costumers	

=== Film ===
Year	Title	Role	Ref
2019	Gold Statue	Recurring role	
2020	Traffic	Yhemolee	
2020	Reach	Ebuka	
2023	Gangs of Lagos	Muri Toronto	
2023	Hotel Labamba	Scodi	
2024	Alakada: Bad and Boujee	Alaba Dollar	
2025	A Very Dirty Christmas	Tega	

== Awards and nominations ==
Year	Event	Category	Work	Result	Ref
2020	City People Entertainment Awards	Best Collaboration	Mon Cheri ft. (Asake, Chinko Ekun, and Ashidapo)	Won	
2020	City People Entertainment Awards	Popular Song of the Year	Himself for Mon Cheri	Nominated	
2020	City People Entertainment Awards	Comedy Act of the Year	Himself	Nominated	
2020	City People Entertainment Awards	Street Music of the Year	Himself for Mon Cheri	Nominated	
2024	Trendupp Awards	The Force Of Online Sensation	Himself	Won	
