= Survive or Die =

- Poster
- Directed by: Daniel Okoduwa; Mike Kang
- Written by: Daniel Okoduwa; Mike Kang
- Produced by: Daniel Okoduwa; Mike Kang; Rohit Gupta; Trevor Doyle; Esha Tewari
- Starring: Felino Dolloso; Emmanuella Samuel
- Cinematography: Nicholas Okoduwa
- Edited by: Henry Dangar
- Music by: Jamie Murgatroyd
- Production company: Scrim Entertainment
- Release date: 3 September 2018 (AACTA Awards)
- Running time: 82 minutes
- Country: Australia
- Language: English

Survive or Die is a 2018 Australian action film about a 16-year-old girl who escapes to Australia on a refugee boat steered by the head of a people-smuggling ring. It was written and directed by Daniel Okoduwa and Michael Kang, and stars Felino Dolloso, Emmanuella Samuel, Caroline McQuade and Hawa Barnes.

== Cast ==
- Felino Dolloso
- Emmanuella Samuel as Shade's Thoughts
- Caroline McQuade as Catherine
- Tino Iheme as Refugee 1
- Salahuddin Ayubi
- Rico Banderas as Raju
- Craig Bourke as Farmer
- Frederick Hama as News Reporter
- Oge Obiokolie as Shade's Sister
- Glen Nutkaze Peters
- Robin Royce Queree
- Sarina Sainju as Maiya

== Release ==
Survive or Die premiered at the AACTA Film Fest in 2018, and was released on Amazon Prime Video in 2020.

== Critical reception ==
The Action on Film Festival review said, "Difficult to watch, harder to come to grips with than a grizzly bear, this movie chills you to the bone. After that, you begin to understand just how important immigration is to the lives of millions of people around the world."

== Accolades ==
- Best Feature Film, Universe Multicultural Film Festival 2019, Los Angeles, California, US
- Winner, Award of Recognition in Accolade Awards, US
- 3rd finalist in the Suspense Thriller Category, Indie Gathering Film Festival, Cleveland, Ohio, US
- Best Indie Feature, Vegas Movie Awards 2019, US
- Best Music Score, Jamie Murgatroyd, Mediterranean Film Festival, Cannes, 2018
- AFIN – International Film Festival, Brisbane, Australia
- Action On Film International Film Festival, US
- Hollywood Dreams Film Fest, Las Vegas, US
- Auckland International Film Festival, New Zealand 2018
- World Music & Independent Film Festival 2019, US
- Best Actress, Hawa Barnes, Best Director, Hollywoodz Dreams Film Festival, US
