= Amazing Klef =

Nigerian photographer

- Born: Okwuchukwu Martins Dominic; 13 September 1994 (age 31); Ojo, Lagos, Nigeria
- Citizenship: Nigerian
- Occupation: Photographer
- Years active: 2016–present
- Organization: AKtivated
- Website: theamazingklef.com

Okwuchukwu Martins Dominic // (born September 13, 1994), known professionally as Amazing Klef, is a Nigerian photographer and creative director.

== Early life ==
Born in Ojo, Lagos, Nigeria. He developed a passion for visual art, graphic design, photography, and cinematography when he was barely 18 years old.

== Career ==
Amazing Klef began his career as a graphic designer and soon realized that he needed to learn photography to enhance his graphic designs. This necessity led him into photography.

He has collaborated with brands such as Pepsi, Bet9ja, MTN, GTBank, Hennessy, Asus, Mirinda, UNICAF, Desperados, LG, European Union, Tecno Mobile, BBC News, Oppo, Mavin Records, Chocolate City, and many more.

Amazing Klef has also worked with notable personalities, including Tiwa Savage, 2face, Olamide, Flavour, DJ Khaled, Rema, Toke Makinwa, KiDi, Nancy Isime, Rita Dominic, Tayo Aina, Blaqbonez, Rudeboy, Laycon, Bimbo Ademoye, Ice Prince, 9ice, Sarkodie, Broda Shaggi, DJ Spinall, and many more superstars in the entertainment, creative, and professional fields.

=== AKtivated ===
He is the founder of AKtivated Studios, a content production brand, creative label, and studio space in Lagos, Nigeria. Amazing Klef also established the Amazing Klef Academy, an online and physical creative education platform that has partnered with brands like Tecno Mobile to teach photography and provide courses and digital assets to people worldwide.

He also founded AKtivated TV, an online entertainment platform with over 25 million views cumulatively, known for creating breakout music content in Nigeria. Since 2019, Amazing Klef has signed and developed creatives through the AKtivated Creative Label, a platform that provides young and promising photographers, videographers, and creatives with the resources they need to succeed.

== Achievements and recognition ==
Amazing Klef has gained significant achievements and recognition in the creative industry. He recently became the first Brand ambassador for Asus Laptops in Nigeria. Previously an influencer and official creator for Oppo Mobile Nigeria, he now holds the same role for Tecno Mobile Nigeria. Notably, he is the first Nigerian photographer to give a TED talk. In 2022, he received the Trendupp Awards "Force of Creative" award, adding to his accolades which include the Scream Awards for ‘Best Photographer & Visual Artist’, the AFAA Photography Award. and he was nominated for the 6th edition NET Honours.

In 2018, Amazing Klef worked on a project for the BBC, capturing images for graffiti artist INSA's visit to Nigeria. His photography has also been featured on Big Brother Naija season 5 and in cover images for a Netflix movie. Additionally, he has been featured in several magazines, TV and radio interviews, and publications, including TVC's Wakeup Nigeria, BeatFM, Wazobia FM, City FM, Spice TV, Showmax's afrobeats documentary.
