= Aso Ebi Diaries =

- Directed by: Biodun Stephen
- Written by: Frances Okeke
- Produced by: Laide Daramola
- Starring: Nancy Isime: Laide Daramola; Jide Kosoko; Kunle Remi
- Edited by: Valentine Chukwuma
- Release date: 18 April 2025
- Country: Nigeria

Aso Ebi Diaries is a Nigerian Nollywood film directed by Biodun Stephen and produced by Laide Daramola. The movie stars Nancy Isime, Kunle Remi, Segun Johnson, and Jide Kosoko.

The movie centers on Elizabeth Gomez, who was deprived of wealth after a family scandal and vows to return to her previous status using her fashion sense and the help of her friends, but she is hung in between love scandals.

== Synopsis ==
Elizabeth Gomez's world falls apart as her family's wealth is destroyed by her father's scandal, bringing her from prosperity to adversity. Determined to regain her position, she uses her sense of style and gorgeous looks to make a statement while navigating Lagos' high society with her best friends, Temi and Chizzy. She struggles with love because she can't decide between Kitan, her childhood crush who comes back with secrets of his own, and Dimeji, her devoted friend who has always loved her. When Fari's bold attempt to interrupt Kitan's engagement turns into a controversy, she is humiliated in public and faces a judicial confrontation. Unexpectedly, she is forced to decide between a future with the man who loved her without conditions and the charm of her past.

== Release ==
The movie premiered on 18 April 2025, across Nigeria. During the premiere Nollywood stars appeared, especially portraying the Yoruba cultural attire.

== Cast ==
- Titi Adejun
- Nancy Isime
- Jide Kosoko
- Stephanie Coker
- Daniel Etim Effiong
- Tosin Ajibade
- Kunle Remi as Dimeji
- Laide Daramola
- Bukky Wright as Elizabeth Gomez' mother
- Kalu Ikeagwu
- Daniel Lloyd
- Shaffy Bello
- Chizzy Alichi
- Bukunmi Adeaga-ilori (Kie kie)
- Fadekemi Olumide-Aluko
