= All of Us (2024 TV series) =

2024 Nigerian High school series

- Genre: High school series
- Written by: Emmanuel ‘Mannie’ Oiseomaye
- Directed by: Orire Nwani; Oluchi Nsofor
- Starring: Enioluwa Adeoluwa; Jemima Osunde; Iyabo Ojo; Kate Henshaw; Tomi Ojo
- Country of origin: Nigeria
- Original languages: English; Yoruba; Nigerian Pidgin; Igbo; Hausa

Production
- Producers: Enioluwa Adeoluwa; Gbolahan Gafar
- Production location: Nigeria
- Cinematography: Lucas Oluwole, Emmanuel Igbekele
- Editors: Valentine Chukwuma, Morenikeji Adeyemi
- Running time: 32 minutes

Original release
- Network: YouTube
- Release: 30 August 2024

All of Us is a 2024 Nigerian high school web series executive produced by Enioluwa Adeoluwa, a Nigerian influencer and actor. It marks his debut as an executive producer. It was first released to YouTube on 30 August 2024. The series was written by Gbolahan "Gaffy" Gafar, who also serves as a producer, and Emmanuel "Mannie" Oiseomaye. It was directed by Orire Nwani and Oluchi Nsofor. It tells the story of typical secondary school life, and the drama, friendship, betrayal and everything that ensues. The cast includes Jemima Osunde, Iyabo Ojo, Chioma Akpotha, Omoni Oboli, Shaffy Bello, and Kate Henshaw.

== Plot summary ==
All of Us tells the story of a group of secondary students who organise and attend a resumption party that lands them in great trouble following the death of a school teacher. In an attempt to keep this secret from the school and general public, their social lives and relationships get threatened.

== Production and release ==
The limited series was released to YouTube on 30 August 2024. The series has ushered in several reception from viewers. Nollywood actor Iyabo Ojo, who also starred in the movie, has publicly expressed her endorsement for the film, urging her fans to watch the film upon release.

== Selected cast ==
- Enioluwa Adeoluwa as Isaac
- Jemima Osunde as Diane
- Tomi Ojo as Layla
- Kate Henshaw as Miss Rita
- Iyabo Ojo as Mrs Isinabo
- Priscilla Ojo as Ivy
- Lillian Esoro as Diane's mum
- Adunni Ade as Elijah's mum
- Ireti Doyle as Propietress
- Rahama Sadau as Ahmad's mum
- Deyemi Okanlawon as Ahmad's dad
- Namisi Govin Emma as Diane’s Brother

== Episodes ==
No.	Title	Directed by	Original release date	Viewers (millions)
1	"Episode 1"	Orire Nweni & Oluchi Nsofor	September 1, 2024	4.1
Friends reunite for a new session. Chinaza Benson joins the class. Principal Obasi gives Isaac the responsibility of reporting the shenanigans of his classmates to him. Ahmad and his friends plan a resumption party. Elijah and Isaac nominate themselves for the Head Boy position. Isaac reveals his "informant" status to Victory, who warns him about it. The opening scene plays once again showing the friends standing over Mr Marcus's corpse visibly terrified.
2	"Episode 2"	Orire Nweni & Oluchi Nsofor	September 1, 2024	2.4
Layla has a nightmare about Mr Marcus. Ahmad gifts Elijah his old phone to replace the one his father smashed. Marcus's death is announced on the news, causing everyone to panic. Isaac begins digging around for information about the party. The Police come to City View to investigate the students. Layla hides Mr Marcus's phone, which she stole from him in the library and cannot find it later. Isaac discovers something shocking on Victory's phone.
3	"Episode 3"	Orire Nweni & Oluchi Nsofor	September 1, 2024	2.2
Isaac finds about Marcus from Victory's phone and force Victory, Layla and Ahmad to confess. Ahmad reveals he stole Mr Marcus's phone from Layla. The Police take Chinaza, Elijah, Layla, Ivy and everyone else in for questioning. Marcus's girlfriend, Tope weeps over hearing the news. Layla confesses to dating Mr Marcus and inviting him to the party. The Police reinvestigate Layla after confirming that she was dating Mr Marcus. Elijah's parents decide to send him to a military school. Some students begin calling Layla names, Ahmad steps in to defend her and physically assaults some of them in the process. Isaac accuses Chinaza of killing Mr Marcus.
4	"Episode 4"	Orire Nweni & Oluchi Nsofor	September 1, 2024	2.2
A full flashback of the party is shown: Mr Marcus enters a room and sees Shalewa intoxicated on the bed. He proceeds to take advantage of her before Chinaza enters the room. He grabs her and threatens her, she fights back and knocks him out, she then wakes Shalewa to see the body. Layla goes to Ahmad's house to talk to him, they eventually reconcile with a kiss. Elijah informs Shalewa that he is leaving for military school. Shalewa later calms him down and they kiss before she leaves. Chinaza prepares dinner for her mum and a tearful prayer session preludes Chinaza's arrest by the police. Layla's mum reads her diary and discovers about her relationship with Mr Marcus. When Layla arrives, she confronts her with this and informs her that she'll be moving back with her dad. But before her dad arrives, Layla runs away and leaves a note. Another flashback shows Ahmad eavesdropping on Mr Marcus and Layla's fight and later at the party, showing him poisoning and drink which he later gives to Mr Marcus. In a post-script scene, Efe kisses Shalewa.

== Production ==
In March 2024, Enioluwa Adeoluwa announced All of Us as his first long-form production. The series was written by Emmanuel “Mannie” Oiseomaye and directed by Orire Nwani and Oluchi Nsofor. Principal photography began in Lagos in April 2024.

== Release ==
The series trailer was released on 6 August 2024, with its premiere scheduled for 30 August on YouTube. The release date was postponed in solidarity with the #EndBadGovernance protests in Nigeria.

== Reception ==
Writing for Marie Claire Nigeria, Oyindamola Adebiyi praised the series use of different Nigerian languages and the performances of Enioluwa Adeoluwa and Chioma Akpotha. However, She argued that several established actors had limited screen time. Uju Okosieme of NollyCritic gave the film a negative review, she criticized the series lack of suspense, underdeveloped characters and dialogue. Okosieme also noted uneven performances, inconsistent lighting and colour grading, and problems with the sound design, while praising Angel Unigwe and Jemima Osunde's performances and the series' use of Nigerian languages and portrayal of family relationships. She gave the series one-and-a-half stars out of five. Nosakhale Akhimien of Premium Times gave the series six-and-a-half stars out of Ten: praising the series' premise and cast but criticized its predictable plot, underdeveloped characters, rushed editing and inconsistent Color grading. Akhimien also identified inconsistencies in the storyline, particularly in the portrayal of the students' efforts to conceal the teacher's death. In a similar review The Culture Custodian criticized the series for its underdeveloped subplots, the characters' unconvincing reactions to the discovery of a body, and the uneven performances of its cast. The review also faulted the dialogue for relying on clichés and the series for predictable plot twists, inconsistent lighting and weak cinematography.
