= Tayo Aina =

Nigerian YouTuber and photographer

- Born: 9 December 1992 (age 33)
- Education: Federal University of Technology Akure
- Occupations: Photographer; filmmaker; YouTuber

YouTube information
- Channel: @TayoAinaFilms
- Years active: 2018–present
- Subscribers: 1 million
- Website: www.tayoaina.com

Tayo Aina (born December 9, 1992) is a Nigerian filmmaker, YouTuber, photographer, media personality, and entrepreneur known for his travel and documentary-style content that explores African culture, business, and lifestyle. As of 2023, his YouTube channel has amassed over one million subscribers. In 2022, he received the Content Creation award at Future Awards Africa.

== Early life and education ==
Tayo Aina was born in Ikeja, Lagos State, Nigeria on December 9, 1992. and is of Yoruba descent. He attended Ifako International Secondary School and later earned a Bachelor of Technology degree in Real Estate from the Federal University of Technology Akure, in 2015.

== YouTube and filmmaking ==
After graduating, Aina briefly worked as a web developer and salesman before becoming an Uber driver in Lagos. During this period, he developed an interest in photography and videography, documenting urban life and architecture. In July 2019, he transitioned to full-time content creation, focusing on travel, real estate, and lifestyle across Africa. Aina’s storytelling approach has led to collaborations with notable artists, including Adekunle Gold and Davido.

Aina collaborated on a documentary focusing on the Boko Haram insurgency in northern Nigeria. The video, which showcases the United Nations Development Programme’s (UNDP) initiatives to promote stability and recovery in the region.

Aina gained recognition for his work, culminating in his receipt of the Future Awards Africa Prize for Content Creation in 2022. His creative journey has been highlighted by brands such as TECNO. In a 2024 interview with BBC and CNN, Aina advocated for improved intra-African mobility, suggesting that current travel restrictions stem from concerns over permanent migration and weaknesses in passport and visa frameworks.

== Awards and recognitions ==
Year	Award	Category	Result
2022	Future Awards Africa	Content creator of the Year	Won
2023	Social media awards	Best YouTube Content Creator	Nominated
2023	Trend Up Awards	Force of YouTube	Nominated
