= Alakada: Bad and Boujee =

2024 Nigerian film by Adebayo Tijani

- Directed by: Adebayo Tijani
- Produced by: Toyin Abraham
- Starring: Toyin Abraham; Odunlade Adekola; Bimbo Ademoye; Ronke Odusanya; Yhemolee; Chimezie Imo
- Music by: Davison Slice Onyemali
- Production companies: FilmOne Studios; Toyin Abraham Productions
- Release date: 20 December 2024
- Running time: 120 minutes
- Country: Nigeria
- Languages: English; Yoruba

Alakada: Bad and Boujee is a 2024 Nigerian English-language comedy-drama film directed by Adebayo Tijani and written by Toyin Abraham. It serves as a continuation of the Alakada film series. The film stars Toyin Abraham, Odunlade Adekola, Ini Edo, Bimbo Akintola Ronke Odusanya, and Okusanya Lolade, with Yhemolee, Ik Ogbonna, and Chimezie Imo playing supporting roles. The film follows the escapades of Yetunde Animashaun, a young woman from a humble background who pretends to be part of the elite to navigate social situations.

The film was released in Nigeria on December 20, 2024, by Filmone Distribution. Alakada: Bad and Boujee grossed ₦134 million during its opening week, indicating a strong Nigeria Box office performance and significant audience interest. This revenue contributed to the film's commercial success in its initial release period.

== Synopsis ==
The story follows Yetunde, a self-proclaimed social media influencer who creates a glamorous online persona with the help of her friends, Rebecca and Abebi. Driven by a relentless desire for fame, validation, and acceptance in elite circles, Yetunde pursues popularity despite her humble background. As the narrative progresses, she is compelled to confront her insecurities and learns the value of staying true to herself.

== Cast ==
- Toyin Abraham as Yetunde Animashaun, the protagonist of the Alakada series, is known for her laugh-out-loud antics, driven by exaggerated lies and outrageous schemes.
- Lizzy Jay as Abebi Yetunde’s assistant and friend often serves as the voice of reason.
- Odunlade Adekola as Brother Jide A street-smart tout that got caught up in Madam Sharon’s organ-harvesting scheme.
- Bimbo Ademoye as Rebecca Yetunde’s manager and confidant, who often frequently warns Yetunde about the consequences of her escalating lies.
- Ini Edo as Madam Sharon a philanthropic socialite and a sinister organ harvester.
- Ronke Odusanya as Shola Shine Shine Yetunde's fashion designer, she lends clothes to Yetunde to help maintain her fake social media persona. She is also romantically involved with Cash, one of Madam Sharon’s associates.
- Lolade Okusanya as Mayowa
- Kola Ajeyemi as Cash
- Aliyat Olamide as Aduke
- Yhemolee as Alaba Dollar.
- Adebimpe Oyebade as Abebi

The additional cast of Alakada: Bad and Boujee includes a range of Nigerian actors and musicians, both established and emerging, such as King Sunny Ade and Portable. Their performances contribute to the film's comedic and narrative elements.

== Production ==
On May 1, 2024, Toyin Abraham announced that the fifth installment of the Alakada film series would be released in December 2024. She will write and direct the film, which will be produced under her production company. This follows the success of previous films in the franchise, including Alakada (2009), Alakada 2 (2013), Alakada Reloaded (2017), and Fate of Alakada (2020).

In November 2024, Toyin Abraham confirmed that King Sunny Ade would make a special appearance in Alakada: Bad and Boujee after sharing a video of the 78-year-old singer arriving at the film's location. She announced on her Twitter account, writing, “Someone special is in #Alakadabadandboujee. He made my dream come true."

== Release ==
Alakada: Bad and Boujee had its world premiere in Lagos on December 15, 2024, and was theatrically released by Filmone Distribution in Nigeria on December 20.

== Reception ==
=== Box office ===
Alakada: Bad and Boujee earned ₦6.6 million on its opening day. It opened at number two at the Nigeria Box office, with an opening weekend gross of ₦60 million, finishing as number two new release for that week. The Guardian Nigeria reported that Toyin Abraham stated the film had earned approximately ₦134 million from ticket sales across cinemas in Nigeria within the first seven days of its release.

Critical response

In a positive review for the Premium Times, Augustine Abu gave the film five out of ten stars, applauding Toyin Abraham for his acting while also praising the film for " offering a sharp commentary on modern societal pressures". however he stated that movie doesn't reveal anything new and doesn't stray away from its previous movies Alakada.
