= Laide Daramola =

Filmmaker, screenwriter, and TV Producer

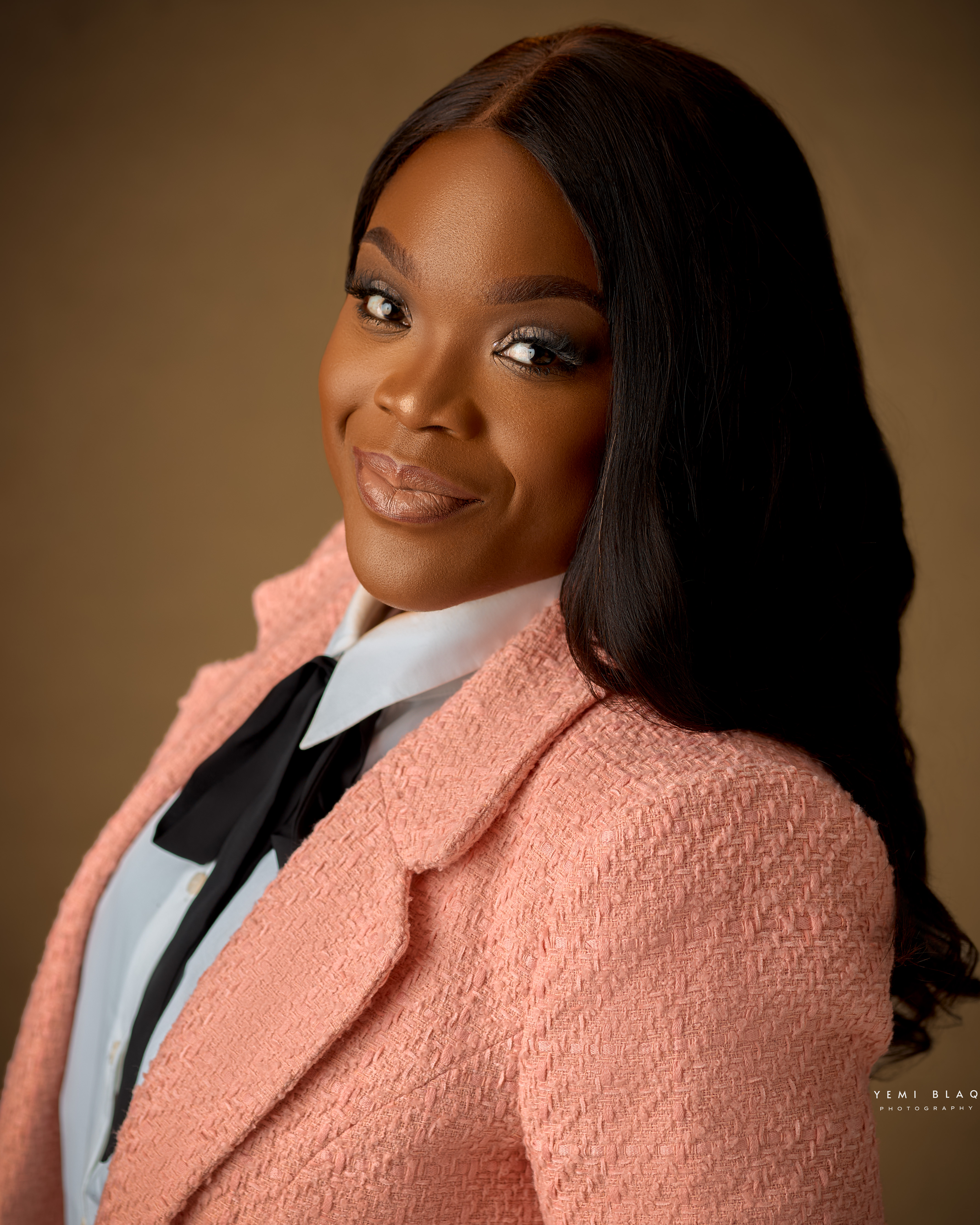
- Born: Olaide Olusola Daramola; 25 December 1981 (age 44); Baltimore, Maryland
- Education: Middlesex University, University of Maryland, Harvard University.
- Occupations: Filmmaker, screenwriter, and television producer
- Organization: Lady Laide Group

Laide Daramola (born December 25, 1981), also known as Lady Laide, is a Nigerian-American filmmaker, screenwriter, and television producer.

== Early life and education ==
Daramola was born in Baltimore, Maryland. She holds a Bachelor of Science degree in information technology from Middlesex University and a master's degree in business administration from the University of Maryland. She obtained a certificate in non-profit management and leadership from Harvard University.

== Career ==
Daramola works in the film industry as a filmmaker, screenwriter, and television producer. She is the founder of Lady Laide Group and Lady Laide Films. She is the executive producer of the film Hotel Labamba, on Amazon Prime Video. She has other feature-length films in production. She is also the filmmaker behind the film Aso Ebi Diaries.

Daramola has spoken in churches, conferences, and panels on topics including entrepreneurship, women and girl empowerment, and leadership.

== Filmography ==
Year	Film	Role	Notes
2025	Aso Ebi Diaries		Producer
2023	Hotel Labamba		Producer

== Awards ==
- 2023 - Hotel Labamba won the Best Comedy Friction Film award at the 2023 Toronto International Nollywood Film Festival (TINFF).

== Philanthropy ==
Daramola is a co-founder of Master's Touch (MsT), a US-based humanitarian organisation that suppprts hospitals and orphanages. Her other initiatives include the Toys for Lagos project and the distribution of blankets to newborns and children in orphanages and hospitals.
