= Eko Heritage Awards =

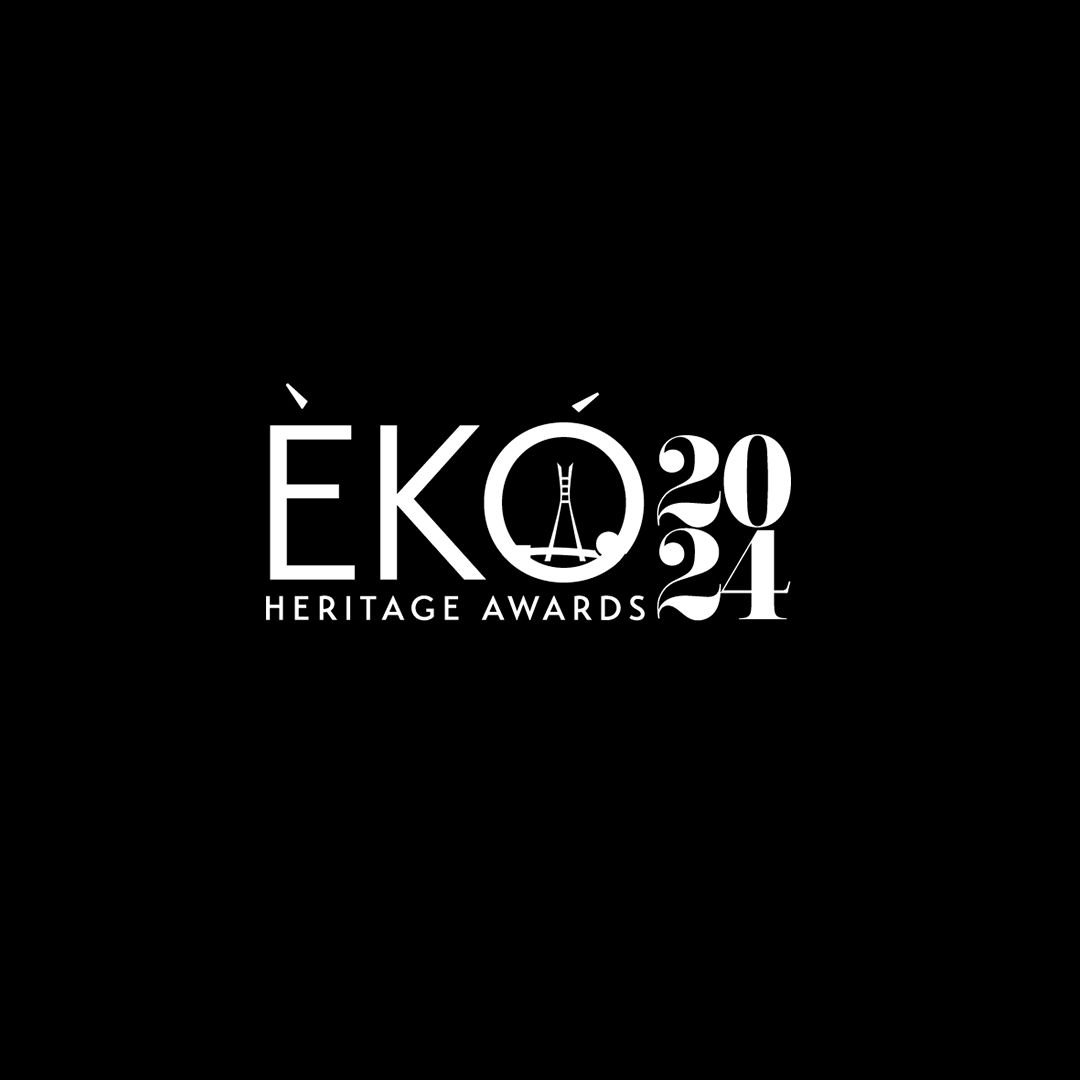
- Official Logo
- Awarded for: Promoters of Lagos cultural heritage
- Country: Nigeria
- Presented by: Ivory Forte Entertainment
- First award: 2021
- Website: ekoheritageaward.com

The Eko Heritage Awards was established in 2021 and is endorsed by the Lagos State Government. The Award celebrates and appreciates promoters of the Lagos State's cultural heritage which includes individuals and organisations from different sectors of the economy like Fashion, Agriculture, Media and also the Oil and Gas industries. The award is presented by Ivory forte entertainment and it is in two segments; The Honorary award category and the Online Voting Category. Some notable recipients of the Eko Heritage Awards include Makayla Malaka, Nancy Isime, Toyin Lawani, Nasboi, Deyemi Okanlawon, Mercy Aigbe, Kayode Kasum, Osas Ighodaro, Mr. Macaroni, Iyabo Ojo and several others.

== Ceremonies ==
=== First edition (2021) ===
The maiden edition was launched in 2021.

=== Second edition (2022) ===
The second edition of the Eko Heritage Awards was held on July 10, 2022, at the Lagos Oriental Hotel, over 25 persons received honorary awards some of which include HRM Oba Olufolarin, Hazmat Yusuf, Babajimi Benson, Makayla Malaka, Maria Chike Benjamin, MC perenpe and several others. They were musical performances by Makayla Malaka, Bustapop, Yemilee and Adeyemi and his afrosonic band. The show also witnessed a beauty pageant, Miss Eko International, which was won by Miss Surulere.

=== Third edition (2023) ===
The third edition was held on Sunday July 16, 2023 at the Lagos Oriental Hotel. Nollywood actresses Mercy Aigbe and Nancy Isime emerged winners of Eko Leadership Award and Eko Most Stylish Personality respectively. Popular content creator Moyosoreoluwa emerged media personality of the year, content creator Nasboi emerged social content creator of the year. and Ashmusy also emerged winner at the third edition. Some of the brands that emerged winners at the third edition is a traveling agency, TMT Travels and tours Limited, they emerged the best distinctive traveling agency of the year. Mr Ideal Nigeria also emerged Best Male pageant brand.

=== Fourth edition (2024) ===
The fourth edition was held on Sunday, July 14, 2024, at the Lagos Oriental Hotel, Victoria Island. Some awardees at the event include Mr. Macaroni, Kiekie, Commissioner Dj Wysei, Adeoluwa Prince Enioluwa, Nollywood actress Osas Ighodaro, fashion stylist Veekee James, and others. Some brands that bagged awards include Elithan Events, Balmoral Events Centre, Dip Tour Traveling and Tours, TMT Cakes and Events, and Misters of Nigeria, which emerged as the Male Pageant Brand of the Year.

=== Fifth edition (2025) ===
The fifth edition of the Eko Heritage Awards was hosted by Sheye Banks and Lexie Armani, and it was held on Sunday, July 27 at the Lagos Oriental Hotel, Victoria Island. This edition was themed " Celebrating Timeless Legacy". Some of the honorees for the fifth edition include Amadou Elizabeth (Jarvis), Phyna, Shank Comics, Purple Speedy, Whaleswavy, Quincy Jones, Lynda Aguocha, and others. Some brands that were also awarded include Whitestone Events Place, Events by Avo, Hills Concepts, Naija Hair Factory, Johito Travels, and Reelsbygeorge. Pooja Media and Communications.

=== Sixth edition (2026) ===
The 2026 edition was themed “From Adversity to Stardom" and was held on Saturday, July 25, 2026, at the Lagos Oriental Hotel hosted by Lexxie Armani. Some of the honorary recipients announced are Uche Pedro, Dickson Aligbe, Dr. Ifeanyi Nwachukwu, Dr. Mbamalu Valentine, Adewale Bright Nfor, Amb. Dr. Ekwutoziam Ashiedu Ogwus Chinedu, Adebola Williams, and Dr. Ebosetale Okhueleigbe. Some Corporate and organizational honorees include Wake Up Nigeria by TVC Communications, which won best family breakfast show, Checkers Africa Limited, and Boiling Point Creatives.

Winners in the public-voted categories include content creator Carter Efe, Mayor FROSH, who won media personality of the year, and Host of Honest Bunch podcast, Husband Material, who won podcaster of the year. Hoganhost won Web hosting company of the year, Afari Travels & Tours won Travel Agency of the Year, and Spotlight PR Agency won PR brand of the year.

== Categories ==
The following are the current categories as of 2024

=== Honorary award categories ===
- Eko distinctive traditional ruler of the year
- Eko most supportive traditional ruler of the year
- Eko traditional ruler of the year
- Eko outstanding white cap chief of the year
- Eko distinctive customary chief of the year
- Eko distinctive cultural ambassador of the year
- Eko youth leader of the year
- Eko young personality of the year
- Eko most stylish personality of the year
- Eko distinctive personality of the year
- Eko entrepreneur of the year
- Eko youth mentor of the year
- Eko innovative mentor of the year
- Eko outstanding government official of the year
- Eko leadership award
- Eko distinctive local government chairman of the year
- Eko distinctive senator of the year
- Eko distinctive house of assembly member of the year
- Eko political leader of the year
- Eko humanitarian award

=== Online voting award categories ===
- Eko fashion designer of the year
- Eko pageant king of the year
- Eko pageant queen of the year
- Eko emerging catwalk coach of the year
- Eko teen queen of the year
- Eko pageant kid of the year
- Eko celebrity kid of the year
- Eko Kid model of the year
- Eko Kid excellence award
- Eko Kid influencer of the year
- Eko brilliant kid of the year
- Eko multi talented kid of the year
- Eko fashion influencer of the year
- Eko events planner of the year
- Eko next rated actor of the year
- Eko actor of the year
- Eko music producer of the year
- Eko movie producer of the year
- Eko breakout artist of the year
- Eko OAP of the year
- Brand influencer of the year
- Eko radio station of the year
- Eko TV station of the year
- Eko social content creator of the year
- Eko media personality of the year
- Eko events centre of the year
- Eko magazine of the year
- Eko disc jockey of the year
- Eko makeup artist of the year
- Eko emerging fashion designers
- Eko fashion brand of the year
- Eko Outstanding Visual Artist (Ceramic and Sculpture) of the Year
- Eko emerging fashion brand
- Eko emerging makeup artist of the year
- Eko tourism brand of the year
- Eko travelling agency of the year
- Eko real estate brand of the year
- Eko realtor of the year
- Eko skincare/spa brand of the year
- Eko recreational spot of the year
- Eko emerging entrepreneur of the year
- Eko cosmetics brand of the year
