= Emmanuella =

Nigerian child comedian (born 2010)

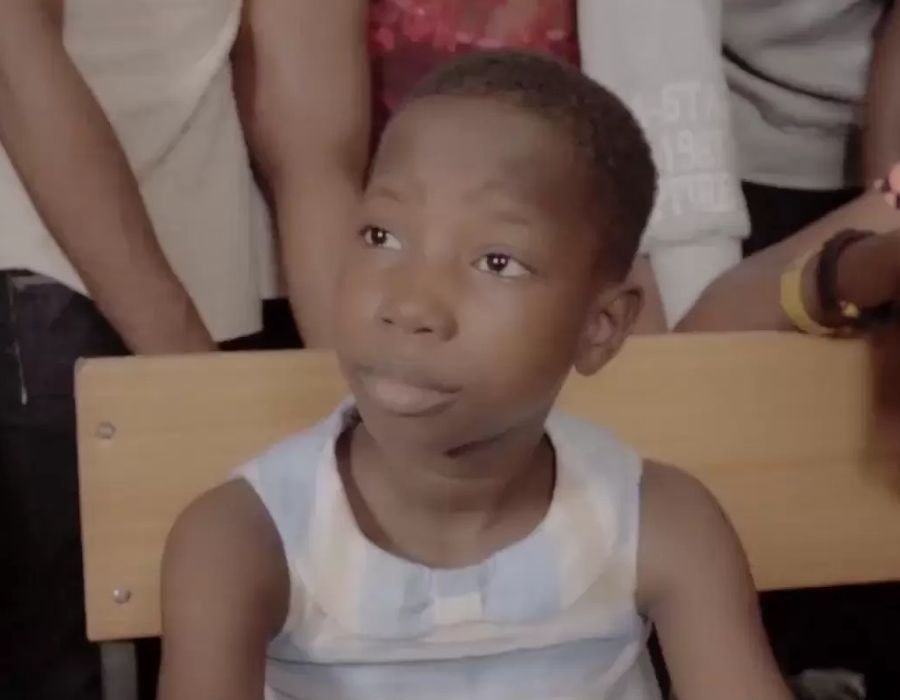
- Emmanuella in 2017
- Born: Emmanuella Samuel; 22 July 2010 (age 16); Port Harcourt, Rivers State, Nigeria
- Other name: Emmanuella
- Education: Brighton Gate Academy School, Port Harcourt
- Occupations: Comedian; actress

YouTube information
- Channel: MarkAngelComedy
- Years active: 2012-present
- Genre: Comedy
- Subscribers: 9.62 million
- Views: 2.57 billion
- Last updated: November 2026

Emmanuella Samuel (born 22 July 2010), known mononymously as Emmanuella, is a Nigerian comedian and actress on Mark Angel's YouTube channel. Emmanuella's first appearance was on episode 34, titled "Who Mess?"

== Career ==
Emmanuella made her foray into comedy at the age of five. She was on a family holiday when she met with Mark Angel. He needed some children for his comedy shoot, and called a few children he knew for the audition, but they couldn't memorize their lines and then, he turned to Emmanuella. Despite the eighteen-hour long video shoot, a stunt he pulled to test the endurance of the kids, Emmanuella did well. After her selection, Angel had to convince her parents to let her become a part of the Mark Angel Comedy team and got their approval. She was featured in an Australian movie titled Survive or Die She became well known after the comedy skit "My Real Face", in which she was making jokes about a headmistress to a student without knowing the student was the daughter of the headmistress. This short skit was featured on CNN's Facebook page.

On 2 April 2020, during the COVID-19 lockdowns, Emmanuella, Success, and Regina Daniels were featured in a skit by Ofego titled "Lockdown" on his YouTube channel using archive footage.

She had her first try in music on a song titled Yes O; a song in which Makayla Malaka features both she and saxophonist Temilayo Abodunrin.

== Awards and recognitions ==
In 2018, Emanuella was fully invited to the National Assembly by Senate President Bukola Saraki on account of her landing a role in a Disney film. She made the announcement of her role in the Disney film on her Instagram handle. In 2016, Emanuella won the award for Top Subscribed Creator from YouTube at the inaugural edition of the Sub-Saharan African YouTube Awards. She also won the Best New Comedienne & Princess of Comedy awards at the Afro-Australia Music & Movie Awards (AAMMA). She was hosted by CNN in November 2016. In 2015, she won the G-Influence Niger Delta Special Talent Award. In 2018, she was nominated alongside Davido, for Nickelodeon's 2018 Kid's Choice Awards, under the category of Favorite African Stars, and in 2021, she won the Nickelodeon Kids' Choice Award for Favorite African Social Star

== Personal life ==
Emanuella's family hails from Imo State. She was born in Port Harcourt, Rivers State. The confusion on her relationship with Angel has been cleared as in the recent post on his IG story Angel called Emmanuella his child, referring to himself as the parent. This confusion has been there for a while as it had been said in different circles that she is his niece, while some say they are cousins. Eze Chidinma of Buzz Nigeria in an article stated that Emmanuella is a niece to Angel. Pulse Nigeria also stated that Angel is an uncle to Emmanuella. On the other hand, George Ibenegbu of Legit.ng stated that the two are cousins. In a later publication also on Legit.ng, Rachael Odusanya stated that they are not related.

== See also ==
- Sisi Yemmie
