= Makayla Malaka =

Nigerian singer and songwriter (born 2012)

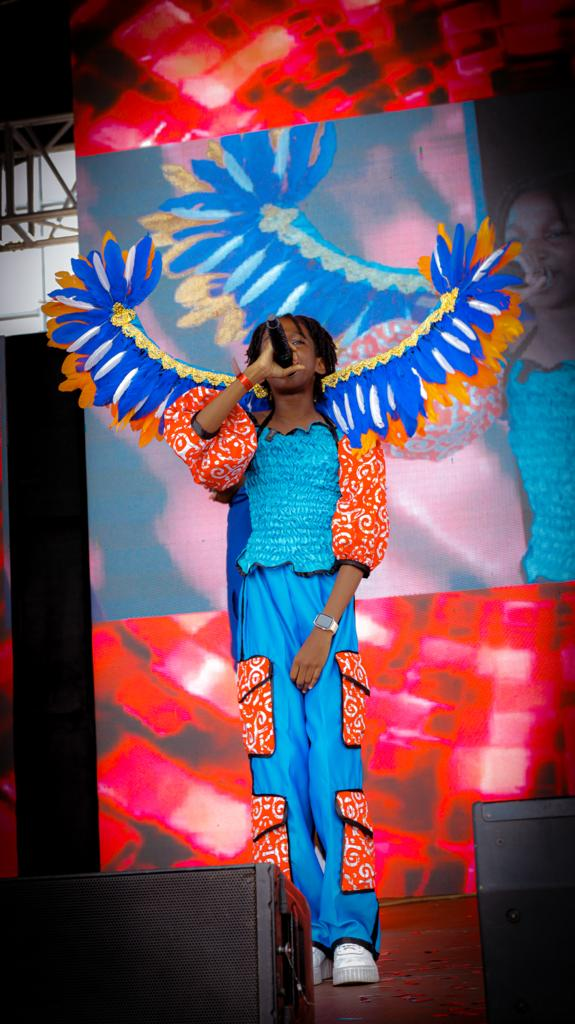
- Makayla Malaka performing

Background information
- Born: Makayla Oghenefejiro Oluwayimika Malaka; 27 June 2012 (age 14); London, United Kingdom
- Genres: Children's music; afro pop
- Occupations: Singer, songwriter, rapper
- Instrument: Vocals
- Years active: 2019–present
- Website: www.makaylamalaka.com

Makayla Oghenefejiro Oluwayimika Malaka (born 27 June 2012), popularly known as Makayla Malaka, is a British-Nigerian singer and dancer. She began her music career as a child singer, releasing her debut album at age eight.

== Background ==
Makayla is from Isoko North in Delta state. She was born in Camden, London, United Kingdom. She resides in Lagos, Nigeria with her parents and is the only child.

== Career ==
Makayla started her career at six years old, recording her first songs. In 2020, she released her debut album titled Eight, at age eight, followed by four more albums, released the next year and the year after that; titled Nine, Ten, Eleven and Twelve respectively. The song on her first album titled Grandma Told Me was remixed by Speroach, while her third album had features with commediene Emmanuella Samuel and saxophonist Temilayo Abodunrin on the track titled Yes O.

In 2022, she authored the book titled African Princess, which told the story of the experience and value as a young girl growing in a male-dominated Nigerian society. The book was an adaptation of one of the tracks from her Sophomore album with the same name. It was co-authored by Sope Martins and was made available to schools. The book was released on 27 May 2022.

In an interview with The Punch, she cites her role model as Michael Jackson. Mr Eazi acknowledged her work in a tweet, after the release of her debut album. In 2023, she released the song Not Likely under Mr Eazi's EmPawa Africa record label.

Her genres of music are children's music and afro pop, which she terms as child friendly. Makayla believes that every child has a gift etched in them. She is of the opinion that children should only be exposed to clean music.

Makayla was tipped by Pulse Nigeria and the Nigerian Tribune as an artiste to look out for in the future, in 2020 and 2022 respectively.

== Awards ==
She was one of the recipients of the 2022 Eko Heritage Awards where she won the Eko Celebrity Kid of the Year, And also performed live at the awards show.

== Discography ==
Studio albums

- Eight (2020)
- Nine (2021)
- Ten (2022)
- Eleven (2023)
- Twelve (2024)
- Once Upon A Rhyme (2025)
