= Bobo (film) =

Kenyan film

BOBO
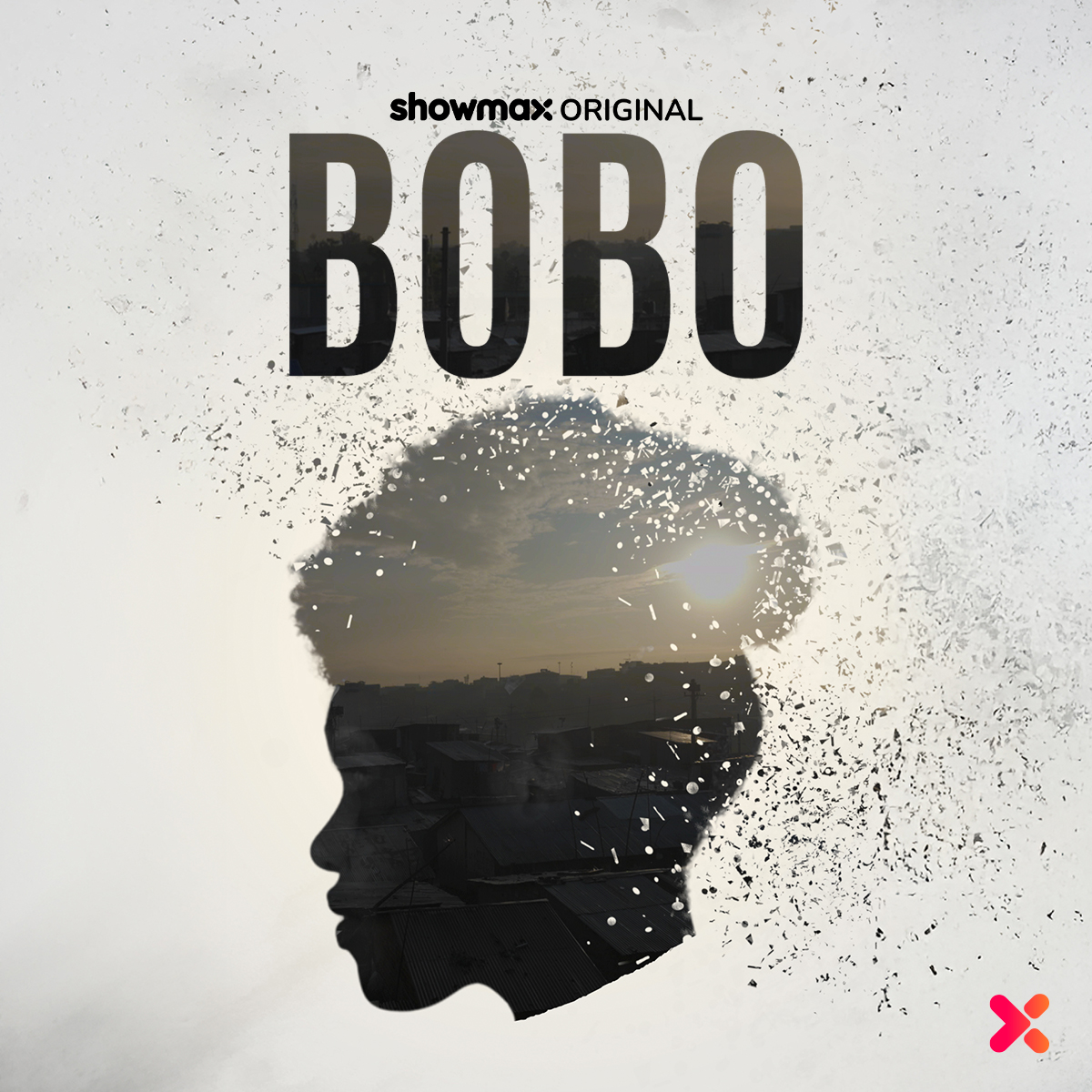
- Directed by: Maurice Muendo
- Screenplay by: Bruno Tanya
- Story by: Maurice Muendo; Christine Wanjiku
- Produced by: Maurice Muendo; Sally Nyoike
- Starring: Faith Muthoni; Kelly Njeri Gathoni; Zak Matasi; Elvis Makutsa; Michael Ndaka; Naitwa Louisa; Catherine Buluma
- Cinematography: Jim Bishop
- Production company: AfricanDopler Limited
- Distributed by: Showmax
- Release dates: May 18, 2025 (2025 Joburg Film Festival); May 30, 2025 (Showmax)
- Running time: 107 minutes
- Country: Kenya
- Language: Swahili

BOBO is a 2025 Kenyan drama film directed by Maurice Muendo in his debut feature. The film was selected to premiere during the 2025 Joburg Film Festival in March 2025 before streaming on Showmax in May.

The movie stars Faith Muthoni as the titular character Bobo, an aspiring runway model from Mathare as she navigates the complexities of her family’s and society’s obligations around her.

BOBO was released on Showmax on 23 May 2025.

== Plot ==
Bobo is an ambitious and resilient young woman from a disadvantaged background who dreams of a better life. As Bobo prepares to enter a modeling competition that could change her life, she faces the complex realities of poverty, family obligations, and the societal limitations imposed on her.

Her grandmother, Shosh, is ailing and relies heavily on medication, while Auntie Grace, her only other support, struggles to make ends meet through her small tailoring business. Biggie, a local loan shark, holds Bobo’s family land as collateral for a loan they took to fund Shosh’s medical treatment. He is merciless in his pursuit, and Bobo's family is constantly under the threat of eviction. Shosh, who once evicted Biggie’s family from their land, is now at the mercy of his vendetta, and Biggie is determined to claim their property as a form of retribution.

Bobo fights to enter and excel in the modeling competition, despite obstacles. She reluctantly agrees to enter after Auntie Grace convinces her, reminding her that the prize money could pay off Biggie and allow her to enroll in university. Training is rigorous, with Auntie Grace pushing her hard, and Bobo’s first round of auditions is a mix of successes and setbacks. Meanwhile, Bobo forms a cautious relationship with Marcus, Biggie’s reluctant protégé, who is also dealing with the pressures of living under Biggie’s control. Marcus becomes an unexpected ally, encouraging Bobo and subtly working to undermine Biggie’s influence.

As Bobo progresses in the competition, Biggie and his accomplices, including his sister Sly, do everything they can to sabotage her chances. They break into Auntie Grace’s shop, destroying her tailoring supplies, including the dresses intended for Bobo’s competition rounds. The act devastates Auntie Grace and enrages Bobo, who is now more determined than ever to fight back. Despite the chaos, Marcus remains by her side, trying to protect her and her family while grappling with his own involvement with Biggie. Bobo faces a particularly painful moment when Shosh learns about the modeling competition and expresses her disapproval, fearing Bobo may face the same exploitation that took her mother’s life.

Bobo steps onto the final runway, carrying not only her dreams but also the hopes of her family. Her confidence and resilience shine through as she competes, undeterred by Sly's taunts or Biggie’s threats. Her performance stuns the judges, capturing the audience's admiration. Her bravery and poise echo her mother’s legacy, symbolizing her determination to rise above her circumstances.

Bobo represents the fight for dignity, survival, and the promise of a brighter future for her family, by compromising her future.

== Cast ==
- Faith Muthoni as Bobo, a promising runway model.
- Michael Ndaka as Marcus, a street photographer and Bobo's love interest.
- Kelly Njeri Gathoni as Sly, Biggie's sister and Bobo's nemesis.
- Zak Matasi as Biggie, a local shylock after Bobo's family.
- Elvis Makutsa as Johnte, an associate of Biggie
- Catherine Buluma as Shosh, Bobo's grandmother
- Louise Sialo as Aunt Grace

== Production ==
The film was the directorial debut for Maurice Muendo after Showmax, in partnership with the Joburg Film Festival, issued an open call for a slate of movies from first-time film directors. BOBO was selected from 296 submissions, whittled down by MultiChoice content executives; Joburg Film Festival curator Nhlanhla Ndaba; award-winning independent filmmakers Femi Odugbemi, Njoki Muhoho and Pat van Heerden; and jury chair Cheryl Uys-Allie, the former Africa director for the MultiChoice Talent Factory film academies in Kenya, Nigeria and Zambia.

== Release ==
BOBO had its world premiere at the 2025 Joburg Film Festival in March 2025 alongside 6 other first time directors. The movie later premiered on Showmax on 23 May 2025.

=== Awards and nominations ===
Year	Award	Category	Recipient(s)	Result	Ref.
2026	Africa Magic Viewers’ Choice Awards	Best Scripted M-Net Original	Maurice Muendo	Nominated	
