= Temilayo Abodunrin =

Nigerian saxophonist (born 2009)

- Born: 19 November 2009 (age 16); Lagos, Nigeria
- Occupation: Saxophonist
- Website: temilayoabodunrin.com

Temilayo Abodunrin (born 19 November 2009) is a Nigerian saxophonist. She is best known for her Duduke and Jowo cover versions.

== Background ==
Temilayo Abodunrin hails from Offa in Kwara State, central Nigeria. She has two brothers who also play musical instruments. She attended Parara Music School when her parents found out about her interest in music.

== Career ==
Temilayo Abodunrin started playing the saxophone at the age of six. She has performed at many concerts sharing the same stage with famous Nigerian artists like Johnny Drille, Tope Alabi, Makayla Malaka, Wole Oni and some others. Temilayo, the multi talented star has also made her debut in the film titled "The Weight" written by Tope Alabi. Temilayo is best known for her cover version of Duduke by Simi and Jowo by Davido which gained wide acceptance.

In an interview with the Nigeria Tribune, Temilayo reviewed that she started as a keyboardist before she became a saxophonist. In the interview, she said she attended a concert where she was invited to play the keyboard and she met other kids like her playing the saxophone. She said, hearing the beautiful sound made her learn the saxophone. She debuted her first official single titled AYO in 2020. She teamed up with Grammy Award nominee Bankulli and award-winning music producer RotimiKeys. The Ooni of Ife cameo-ed in the music video.

=== Performances ===
In 2019, Temilayo Abodunrin was invited to perform at season 11 of the Channels International Kids Cup.

== Awards ==
On 3 January 2021, she was part of the Ogo Yoruba Awards (OYA) 2020.

== See also ==
- Emmanuella
- Makayla Malaka
