= Hotel Labamba =

2023 Nigeria drama film

- Directed by: Biodun Stephen
- Written by: Frances Okeke
- Produced by: Biodun Stephen
- Starring: Femi Adebayo; Lateef Adedimeji; Pamilerin Adegoke; Yhemolee; Laide Daramola; Lilian Afegbai
- Edited by: Adio Solanke; Biyi Toluwalase
- Production company: Lady Laide Films
- Distributed by: Amazon Prime Video
- Release date: 28 July 2023
- Running time: 96 minutes
- Country: Nigeria
- Languages: English; Yoruba

Hotel Labamba is a 2023 Nigerian drama Crime comedy film directed by Biodun Stephen and written by Frances Okeke. It features an ensemble cast including Femi Adebayo, Lateef Adedimeji, Pamilerin Adegoke, Bimbo Ademoye, Idowu Adeyemi (Yhemolee), Lilian Afegbai and Laide Daramola.

== Plot ==
In the exclusive and secretive world of Hotel Labamba, the hotel's manager is given an urgent task by the owner, Chief, to prepare the establishment for the arrival of important dignitaries. However, chaos ensues when one of the dignitaries is found dead under mysterious circumstances. With the entire hotel staff and guests becoming suspects, the race is on to uncover the killer before Chief's esteemed guests arrive, threatening the hotel’s reputation and the safety of everyone involved.

== Cast ==
- Femi Adebayo as SIU head detective
- Abdularhamon Adedimeji as bar extras
- Lateef Adedimeji as Big Berry
- Bimbo Ademoye as Detective Zizi
- Idowu Adeyemi (Yhemolee) as Scodi
- Lilian Afegbai as Ella
- Lillian Akpanta as office staff
- Karen Ajimobi as Efe
- Laide Daramola as hotel guest
- Pamilerin Adegoke as bar extras
- Bolaji Ogunmola
- Blessing Jessica Obasi

== Reception ==
Hotel Labamba received positive reviews for its humor, performances, and portrayal of Nigerian society. Critics praised the film's ability to balance comedy with more serious themes, though some offered criticism of certain aspects. On Nollywire, the film has a rating of 5.4 out of 10, indicating "mixed or average reviews."

Stephen Onu of Premium Times gave Hotel Labamba a 5/10 rating, praising the mystery aspect of the film, as well as its editing and cinematography. He wrote, "On the better side, the comedy is simple yet effective, and the performances never feel forced. Detectives Zizi and Yaema, in particular, stand out and leave room for a possible sequel." However, Onu also criticized the film, stating that it "misses the opportunity to construct a more respectable puzzle, considering the quality of the actors involved."

Victory Hayzard Solum of Afrocritik said: "Hotel Labamba lets you know right off the bat that it is not to be taken too seriously. With character names like Chuba Okadigbo, and Ozumba Mbadiwe, the suspicion that this movie might just be a commentary on the Nigerian elite is already a step in the wrong direction: the names mean absolutely nothing."

Ayodele Olawumi of WhatKeptMeUp wrote that the film "Hotel Labamba is fairly funny as some of the actors seem to understand that they were taking on comic roles and put in enough to this effect, but you will be left disappointed if you had been intrigued by the prospect of a murder mystery."

== Release ==
Hotel Labamba was officially released on Amazon Prime Video on July 28, 2023.

== Awards and nominations ==
Year	Award	Category	Result	Ref
2023	Global Film Festival	Best Feature Film	Won	
2023	Global Film Festival	Best Director - Biodun Stephen	Won	
2023	Global Film Festival	Best Assemble Cast	Won	
2023	Toronto International Nollywood Film Festival (TINFF)	Best Comedy Friction Film	Won	
