= Tiwalola Olanubi =

Nigerian entrepreneur

- Education: B.Sc Quantity Suveryor, University of Lagos
- Occupations: PR, Advertising, Digital Marketing
- Known for: DottsMediaHouse / Trendupp Africa
- Title: Founder / Group CEO
- Board member of: Dotts Group, Forge & Flip Ltd
- Website: www.dottsgroup.xyz

Tiwalola Olanubi Jnr (born June 28, 1988) is a Nigerian media & technology entrepreneur.

He is the founder of the marketing firm Dotts Media House. In 2019, He founded a reward based creators platform called Trendupp Africa; Owners of Trendupp Awards & Trendupp Africa Magazine. In 2017, He established Zarafet Loaves & a real estate firm called Forge and Flip Ltd in 2022. He is also the chief publisher of the Nigerian Influencer Marketing Report (NIMR).

== Career ==
In his 3rd year, he was appointed as a brand ambassador for Blackberry Nigeria. This reinforced his interest in media and communications.

Following his graduation, Olanubi Jnr went on to established Dotts Media House (a digital marketing and communications firm) which has now expanded into a group company - Dotts Group with three subsidiaries which include DottsMediaHouse Limited, Dotts Co-Working Space, and Asteri Africa (a booking and management firm).

During the company's early years, there were reports it was involved in over 50% of online campaigns and influencer marketing in the Nigerian digital marketing space. The company then in 2019, published Nigeria's first ever influencer marketing report called NIMR (Nigerian Influencer Marketing Report). The report is published annually and shared at the Social Media Week Lagos to media enthusiasts & content creators. Olanubi Jnr founded two other companies in the process, Zarafet Loaves, a bread production outfit and an influencers and content creators platform called Trendupp Africa.

The Guardian Life Magazine once wrote that Olanubi is one of the Nigerian youths shaping the future while Vanguard Allure listed him as one of the 12 outstanding youths nominated for Future Awards. In 2018, His communications Firm, DottsMediaHouse was named Africa's Most Outstanding Quality Digital Marketing Company of the year by African Quality Achievement Award and also named West Africa Digital Marketing Agency of the decade.

Olanubi Jnr has been involved in CSR Projects including Leap Africa's Youth Day of Service, NaijaHacks Hackaton etc., Tiwalola is passionate about Governance, youth development and Entrepreneurship.

== Awards ==
Tiwalola Olanubi has received several recognitions and awards over the years, some of which include:

- Olanubi was nominated twice in three years for Future Awards Africa.
- 2025: Africa's Digital Marketing Leader at the GAHAwards
- 2024: Most Innovative Entrepreneur at The Global Entrepreneurship Festival
- 2023: 40Under40 CEO in Media
- 2022: Africa's most performing CEO, PanAfrican Intl Annual Awards
- 2017: TFAA Prize in Media Enterprise.
- 2019: TFAA Prize in Business.
- He was named the Young CEO of 2019 at the Creative Faith Academy Awards.
- He was awarded in 2020/2021/2022 as the CEO of the year at the BrandCOM Awards.
- Ynaija recognized him as one of the 10 under 40 most powerful young persons on social media.
- He received an honorary doctorate in arts, with a specialization in entrepreneurship and digital marketing by European-American University
