= Aproko Doctor =

Nigerian doctor (born 1990)

- Born: Egemba Chinonso Fidelis; 26 October 1990; Imo State, Nigeria
- Education: Nnamdi Azikiwe University, Awka
- Occupation: Medical doctor
- Years active: 2017–present

Egemba Chinonso Fidelis (born 26 October 1990) popularly known as Aproko Doctor, is a Nigerian doctor, health influencer and an actor. He is the founder of Healthy Brands and 100K Club, a non-profit organisation.

== Career ==
Since childhood, Egemba nursed the dream of becoming a medical doctor. He began his medical career in 2016, as a resident doctor in Imo State University Teaching Hospital.

A year after, he moved back to Lagos with the hopes of securing better job opportunities. In 2017, he started sharing health nuggets and wellness tips on social media under the brand name "Aproko Doctor". He is best known for breaking down medical situations using humour and storytelling. In 2020, he founded the 100K Club, a non-profit organisation that gives support to Nigerians who need health assistance. He is a three-time winner of the Trendupp Awards and a two-time winner of the Pulse Influencer Awards.

== Filmography ==
In 2022, Egemba featured in "Strain", a Nigerian Netflix movie that raises awareness on Sickle Cell Anemia. He starred alongside Bimbo Akintola, Shushu Abubakar, Alex Usifo, Gloria Anozie-Young.

== Awards and nominations ==
Year	Award	Category	Result	Ref
2023	PSHAN	Health Influencer of the Year	Won	
2023	Trenduup Awards	The Force of Wellness	Won	
2022	Trenduup Awards	The Force of Wellness	Won	
2022	The Future Awards Africa	Prize for Health and Wellness	Nominated	
2022	Pulse Influencer Awards	Health and Fitness Influencer of The Year	Won	
2021	Trenduup Awards	The Force of Wellness	Won	
2020	Impact Africa Summit	Health Influence on Media	Won	

== Personal life ==
In June 2020, Egemba married Chiamaka Nwakalor. In December 2022, he revealed his struggle with a brain tumour "Craniopharyngioma" which required surgery.
