= Federal Government Girls College, Akure =

- Ondo State; Nigeria

Information
- Established: October, 1977
- Gender: Girls
- Website: https://fggcakure.com

Federal Government Girls College, Akure (FEGGICOLLA) is a Federal Government owned secondary school, run by the Federal Ministry of Education. It is an all girls' secondary school situated in Akure the capital city of Ondo State, Nigeria. It is one of over 100 Federal Government owned unity schools managed by the Federal Ministry of Education, Nigeria.

== History ==
Federal Government Girls College, Akure was founded on 28 October 1977.
