= Joburg Film Festival =

Annual film festival in Johannesburg, South Africa

- Location: Johannesburg, South Africa
- Founded: 2016
- Most recent: 6th: 28 February – 3 March 2024
- Artistic director: Timothy Mangwedi (2024)
- Website: joburgfilmfestival.co.za
- 7th: 11–16 March 2025

The Joburg Film Festival (JFF) is an international annual film festival held at various venues in Johannesburg, notably Rosebank, Melrose Arch and Sandton Gauteng, South Africa.

== History ==
Joburg Film Festival was founded in 2016. Because of the COVID-19 pandemic, the 2021 and 2022 editions were skipped. The 5th edition was held from 31 January – 5 February 2023.

== Description ==
Joburg Film Festival (JFF) is an international annual film festival held at various venues in Johannesburg ("Joburg"), Gauteng, South Africa. The festival is supported by the South African satellite television broadcast company MultiChoice.

== Program ==
The festival features a film screening schedule, an industry program with panel discussions, talks and masterclasses, an educational youth program, a social event, and a commercial content market JBX.

== Awards ==
The awards announced for 2025 are Best Feature Film, Best African Film, Best Documentary and Best Joburg Produced Film (only Joburg-based filmmakers are eligible for this prize).

== Past award winners ==
- Independent Feature 2023 - The Cloud and the Man (Manikbabur Megh) by Abhinandan Banerjee - Fiction 97 minutes.
