= Kemi Filani =

Nigerian news source

Kemi Filani News
- Type: Entertainment and lifestyle news
- Format: Online
- Editor-in-chief: Tireni Adebayo
- Editor: Ella Chioma
- Founded: 2012
- Language: English
- Headquarters: Ikorodu, Nigeria
- Website: kemifilani.ng

Kemi Filani News, or KFN for short, is a Nigerian online news platform established in May 2012. It publishes content on the Nigerian entertainment industry, including celebrities, films, and music. The platform was rebranded in 2018 with a focus on journalism, particularly in the areas of entertainment news and Nollywood film reviews.

Kemi Filani News publishes daily reports on Nigerian celebrity fashion and entertainment. The platform's entertainment section receives between 5 and 7 million monthly visitors, and its Nollywood film reviews have been noted for contributing to discussions on cinematic standards within the industry. The platform has received nominations for the Nigerian Writers Award (2017) and the West Africa Bloggers Award (2018).

== Recognition ==
Kemi Filani News has been cited by media outlets, including Mashable, Yahoo, and the BBC, for its contributions to digital journalism in Nigeria. Its articles have provided insight into various social and cultural issues, such as Nollywood's evolution and public discourse around entertainment. Additionally, Independent Nigeria highlighted its influence on Nollywood movie reviews, while Vanguard Nigeria recognised its role in online news consumption.
