= Felino Dolloso =

Filipino-Australian actor

- Born: 1980 (age 45–46); Manila, Philippines
- Occupation: Actor
- Years active: 1998-present
- Website: felinodolloso.wordpress.com

Felino Dolloso (born 1980) is a Filipino Australian actor currently based in Sydney, Australia.

== Early life ==
Dolloso was born in Manila, and raised and educated in Australia.

== Career ==
As an actor, Dolloso has worked in television, film and theatre in Australia. Dolloso acted in the feature films Seeing the Elephant with ICE Productions, Candy, The Devil's 6 Commandments, Mother Fish, Balibo, The King's Seed, Adventures of a Happy Homeless Man, Ra-Choi, Under the same sky, Immigrants and Cigarettes, Survive or Die.

In Television, he has worked as an actor in guest roles and major roles in Upright, The Hostages, Answered by Fire, All Saints, Spirited, Packed to the rafters, Post Life, House of Hancock, Hyde & Seek, Wanted 2, Maximum Choppage and Better Man (2013).

In Theatre, on stage Dolloso has worked in several productions. He received rave reviews for his work as the character 'Major' in the play 'A Quiet Night in Rangoon' " Felino Dolloso's Major, in particular, is a finely tuned and powerful performance that has the ability to move us and draw us into the emotional complexities of being trapped on the darker side of the struggle for freedom. Dolloso's monologues are the highpoint of this production and indicate an actor of great depth who's full of exciting promise." - Helen Barry, Australian Stage. Felino Dolloso's latest role 'KAI-LE' in the ABC2/NBCUniversal/Matchbox Pictures upcoming Television series Maximum Choppage.

Felino Dolloso was nominated for a Best Australian Actor Award in the AFIN International Film Festival Australia 2019 for his role of The Captain in the feature Survive or Die.
