= Toyin Abraham =

Nigerian actress and filmmaker (born 1982)

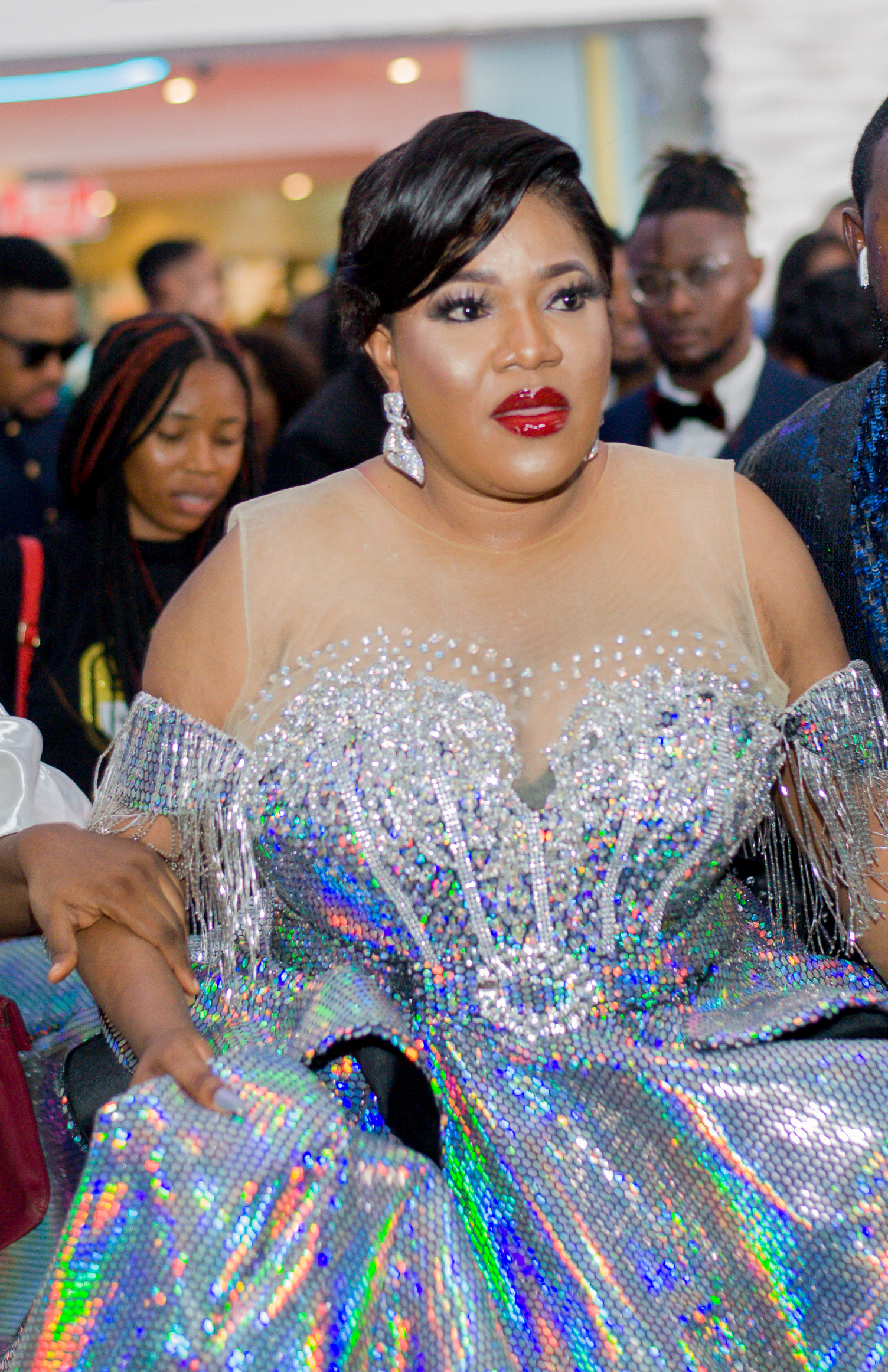
- Abraham at the AMVCAs 2020
- Born: Oluwatoyin Aimakhu; 5 September 1980 (age 46); Auchi, Bendel State, Nigeria (now in Edo State, Nigeria)
- Citizenship: Nigerian
- Education: Osun State Polytechnic, Ibadan Polytechnic
- Occupations: Actress; filmmaker; director
- Years active: 2003–present
- Known for: Oversabi Aunty, Ebi Mi ni, Okafor's Law, Love is in the Hair, Mentally, Alakada, Alakada Reloaded, Elevator Baby, The Prophetess, Ijakumo
- Spouses: Adeniyi Johnson (m. 2013; div. 2015); Kola Ajeyemi (m. 2019)
- Awards: AMVCA Best Actress in a Drama

Toyin Abraham Ajeyemi (born Olutoyin Aimakhu; 5 September 1980) is a Nigerian actress and filmmaker.

== Career ==
Abraham started acting in 2003 when Nigerian actress Bukky Wright came to Ibadan to shoot a movie. Abraham has made, directed, and starred in several Nigerian films including Alani Baba Labake, Ijakumo: The Born Again Stripper and Ebimi ni. During the 2013 Best of Nollywood Awards, Abraham was nominated for Best Supporting Actress in a Yoruba film titled Ebimi ni, alongside Joke Muyiwa, who was nominated for Best Lead Actress in a Yoruba film titled Ayitale. Abraham also starred in the movie, Black Val. Martini Animashaun, the CEO of Tinimash Entertainment, created and managed her reality show titled, Keeping Up With Toyin Aimakhu.

In 2020, Abraham was made the ambassador for Revolution Plus Properties, a Lagos-based property outfit.

In early 2026, Toyin Abraham’s directorial debut film, Oversabi Aunty, grossed over ₦1 billion at the West African box office, making it one of the highest‑earning Nollywood films of all time and a milestone for her directing career.

Abraham also owns Toyin Abraham Productions.

== Personal life ==
In July 2019, Abraham married fellow Nollywood actor Kolawole Ajeyemi in a traditional wedding ceremony. The couple welcomed their first child together, a son named Ire, in August 2019.

== Selected filmography ==
- Alani Baba labake (2013)
- Ebimi ni (2013)
- Alakada (2009) as Yetunde
- Omo Elemosho (2012) as Tinuke
- Alakada 2 (2013) as Yetunde
- Okafor's Law (2016) as Tomi Tiiani
- What Makes you Tick (2016)
- Love is in the Hair (2016) as Constance
- Alakada Reloaded (2017) as Yetunde
- Esohe (2018) as Titilola
- Hakkunde (2017) as Yetunde
- Mentally (2017) as Ewa
- Tatu (2017) as Larayi
- London Fever (2017) as Food Seller
- Wives on Strike: The Revolution (2017) as Iya Bola
- Celebrity Marriage (2017) featuring Tonto Dikeh, Felix Ugo Omokhodion, and Jackie Appiah
- The Ghost and the Tout (2018) as Isla
- Seven and Half Dates (2018) as Abiodun
- Disguise (2018) as Gigi
- What just happened (2018)
- Elevator Baby (2019) as Abigail
- Don't Get Mad, Get Even (2019) as Ngozi
- City Of Dreams (2019) as Becky
- Made in Heaven (2019) as DPO
- Two Weeks in Lagos (2019) as Kemi
- The Millions (2019) as Adenike
- Kasanova (2019) as Bisola
- Bling Lagosians (2019) as Dunni Fernendez
- Nimbe (2019) as Uduak
- Diamonds In The Sky (2019) as Yesimi Gbeborun
- Fate of Alakada (2020) as Yetunde
- Dear Affy (2020) as Teni the Blogger
- Small Chops (2020) as Bar Manager
- Sola Fe Pami
- Kambili (2020) as Jessica
- Shadow Parties (2021) as Arike
- Aki and Pawpaw (2021) as Mama Nkiru
- The Prophetess (2021) as Prophetess Ajoke
- The Therapist (2021) as Mrs. Priye
- Ghost and The Tout Too (2021) as Isla
- Day of Destiny (2021) as Captain
- King of Thieves (2022) as Bonuola
- The Stranger I Know (2022) as Fasayo
- The Wildflower (2022) as Mama Olisa
- Single Not Searching (2022) as Omowunmi
- Ijakumo: The Born Again Stripper (2022) as Asabi
- Imade (2023) as Imade's Mum
- Onyeegwu (2023) as Prophetess
- Malaika (2023)
- Arodan (2023) as Kukoyi
- Gangs of Lagos (2023) as Bamidele
- House of Ga'a (2024) as Edan Asiko
- American Japa (2024)
- Omoge Suzzy (2024) as Alhaja
- Alakada: Bad and Boujee (2024) as Yetunde
- Oversabi Aunty (2025) as Adetoun
- Ìyálóde (2025) as Asabi Onile

== Awards and nominations ==
Year	Award	Category	Work	Result	Ref
2010	Best of Nollywood Awards	Best Indigenous Actress in a Lead Role (Yoruba)	Awa Obinrin	Nominated	
2011	Best of Nollywood Awards	Best Indigenous Actress in a Lead Role (Yoruba)	Ikudoro	Nominated	
2012	Yoruba Movie Academy Awards	Best Actress in Leading Role		Nominated	
2013	Yoruba Movie Academy Awards	Best Cross Over Actress	Jejeloye	Nominated	
2013	Best of Nollywood Awards	Best Actress in a Lead Role –Yoruba film	Alani Baba Labake	Nominated	
2016	Best of Nollywood Awards	Best Actress in a Lead Role(Yoruba)	Metomi	Won	
2017	Five Continents International Film Festival	Best Supporting Actress Feature Film	Hakkunde	Won	
2017	Best of Nollywood Awards	Best Supporting Actress –English	Tatu (film)	Nominated	
2018	Africa Magic Viewers' Choice Awards	Best Supporting Actress	Tatu (film)	Nominated	
2018	Africa Movie Academy Awards	Best Actress in a Supporting Role	Esohe	Nominated	
2020	Africa Magic Viewers' Choice Awards	Best Actress in a Drama	Elevator Baby	Won	
2020	Africa Magic Viewers' Choice Awards	Best Actress in a Comedy	Bling Lagosians	Nominated	
2020	Africa Magic Viewers' Choice Awards	Best Actress in a Comedy	Kasanova	Nominated	
2020	Best of Nollywood Awards	Best Actress in a Lead role –English	Elevator Baby	Nominated	
2020	NET Honours	Most Popular Actress		Nominated	
2023	Legit.ng's Readers Choice Awards	Best Actress		Nominated	
2023	NET Honours	Most Popular Actress		Nominated	
2024	Legit.ng Entertainment Awards	Best Actress		Nominated	
2025	2024 Silverbird Man of Year Awards	Trailblazer Award		Won	

== See also ==
- List of Nigerian film producers
- List of Yoruba people
