= Oversabi Aunty =

2025 Nigerian comedy drama film

- Directed by: Toyin Abraham
- Written by: Toyin Abraham
- Story by: Toyin Abraham
- Produced by: Toyin Abraham
- Starring: Toyin Abraham; Mike Ezuruonye; Tana Adelana; Jemima Osunde; Efe Irele; Enioluwa Adeoluwa
- Edited by: Areo Abraham Temitope
- Distributed by: FilmOne Distributions
- Release date: 19 December 2025
- Country: Nigeria

Oversabi Aunty is a 2025 Nigerian comedy drama film produced and directed by Toyin Abraham in her directorial debut. The film stars Abraham alongside Mike Ezuruonye, Jemima Osunde, Enioluwa Adeoluwa, Toyin Afolayan, Efe Irele and Tana Adelana. It was theatrically released on 19 December 2025 and distributed by FilmOne Entertainment.

The film became the first directorial debut in Nollywood history to gross over ₦1 billion at the Nigerian box office. It is also among the highest-grossing Nigerian films of all time.

== Plot summary ==
Oversabi Aunty follows Toun, a church usher whose devotion to church activities is overshadowed by her obsession with judging and correcting others. Married to Chidi, she lives in a culturally blended Yoruba–Igbo household with their four children: Seyi, Aderoke, Timitope, and Chuka. Despite her outward display of moral authority, Toun neglects her responsibilities at home, creating emotional distance and unresolved tensions within her family. The introduction of her first daughter, Seyi soon turns into chaos and Toun is now forced to confront the chaos she created.

== Selected cast ==
- Toyin Abraham as Toun
- Mike Ezuruonye as Chidi
- Tana Adelana as Achalugo
- Jemima Osunde as Ada
- Enioluwa Adeoluwa as Chuka
- Efe Irele as Seyi
- Aliyat Olamide as Tope
- Queen Nwokoye as Aunty Rose
- Bianca Ugo as Aderonke

== Release and distribution ==
Oversabi Aunty premiered at Filmhouse IMAX Cinema, in Lagos, on 14 December 2025, followed by its UK release on 19 December where it grossed £16,205 in its opening weekend. The National Film and Video Censors Board (NFVCB) presented Abraham with the box office champion award for grossing over 1 Billion Naira at the Nigerian box office.
