= Mark Angel (comedian) =

Nigerian comedian and video producer

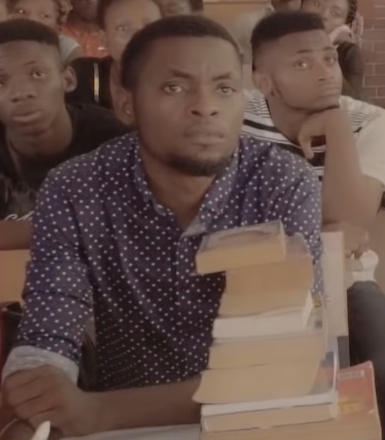
- Mark Angel in 2017
- Born: 27 May 1991 (age 35); Port Harcourt, Nigeria
- Occupations: Comedian; scriptwriter; YouTuber

YouTube information
- Channel: MarkAngelComedy
- Years active: 2013–present
- Genres: Comedy; sketch comedy; prank
- Subscribers: 9.61 million
- Views: 2.54 billion
- Last updated: 17 June 2026
- Website: markangelcomedy.com

Mark Angel (born 27 May 1991) is a Nigerian comedian and YouTuber. He is best known for the Mark Angel Comedy series of shorts on YouTube, often featuring child comedians such as his niece, Emmanuella Samuel (age 16) and her cousin "Aunty" Success Madubuike (age 13). Angel's YouTube channel was the first African comedy channel to reach one million subscribers.

== Early and personal life ==
Angel was born in 1991 in Port Harcourt, Rivers State. His parents hail from Imo State. He attended Obafemi Awolowo University to study medicine but left for family reasons. After college, he studied cinematography in India and spent time in Nigeria gaining experience in cinematography and theater but could not find stable paying work in Nollywood. He began independent filmmaking in 2013 under his studio, Mechanic Pictures.

== Mark Angel Comedy ==
Angel is best known for Mark Angel Comedy, a series of YouTube comedy shorts that feature a number of people from Angel's family and neighborhood in Port Harcourt. Many of the shorts involve children, primarily Emmanuella and Success.

Angel's first well known short is "Oga Landlord," wherein a man late on rent (Angel) is trying to hide from his landlord (Daddy Humble) and tries in vain to have a child (Emmanuella) cover for him (e.g. "My uncle is not around. He just told me.").

Emmanuella is Angel's longest-appearing actress. She has won comedy awards in Nigeria and Australia for her work with Angel, and is Africa's youngest YouTube award winner. She started film work in school as part of a class video project prior to being chosen by Angel for his stable of actors. Videos starring her often reach up to a million views in the first week after posting.

Mark Angel Comedy received a plaque from YouTube for having reached one million subscriptions in 2017. It was the first Nigerian-based YouTube channel to reach that threshold.

In 2018 it was announced that Samuel would be attached to an upcoming Disney feature film. On 2 April 2020, during the COVID-19 lockdowns, Emmanuella, Success, and Regina Daniels were featured in a skit by Ofego titled "Lockdown" on his YouTube channel, using archive footage.

=== 1xBet ambassador ===
In the summer of 2021, Mark Angel signed a contract with 1xBet, an online gambling company popular in Nigeria.

== Film style ==
Mark Angel works mostly with multiple camera formats and close camera angles. Filming sometimes includes shaky camera techniques to give them a natural and down-to-earth feel, something Angel calls "freestyle comedy."

Angel primarily films within his family's lower-class neighborhood in Port Harcourt, as a means to portray the environment he grew up in and relate to other common people in Nigeria.
