= Veekee James =

Nigerian fashion designer (born 1995)

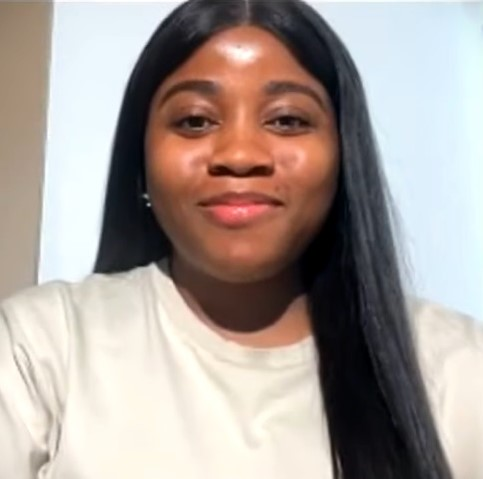
- James in 2023

Background information
- Born: Victoria James; June 9, 1995 (age 31); Akwa Ibom, Nigeria
- Origin: Akwa Ibom State
- Occupations: Fashion designer; entrepreneur; songwriter
- Years active: 2019–present

Ruth Erikan James (born 9 June 1995), popularly known as Veekee James is Nigerian fashion designer, gospel singer and entrepreneur. She is the founder of Veekee James, a fashion brand and also the convener of Zion Warship, a monthly gospel concert. In 2021, she was the recipient of the AMVCA for best designer of the year. In May 2023, she debuted her first single "Nothing Less".

== Early life and education ==
Ruth Erikan James was born on 9 June 1995 in Nsit Atai, Akwa Ibom State where she also hails from. She was born into the family of Mr Augustine James and Mrs Esther James as the only daughter among two brothers. Her father was an architect, while her mother owned a tailoring outlet. She lost her father when she was almost five years old, making her mother the sole breadwinner of the family. While she was still an infant, her family relocated to Ajegunle, Lagos State, where she also spent most of her childhood, alongside her two brothers, and also acquired her primary and secondary education there.

In 2015, she got into the University of Uyo, Akwa Ibom State to pursue a degree in Biochemistry but left to pursue her passion.

== Career ==
Veekee James started learning how to make clothes when she was still a child from her mother, Esther James.

In 2019, she was inspired by her mother to start her own fashion brand "Veekee James. She first started her brand by opening a fashion outlet on the Lagos Mainland, but later relocated to the Lagos Island, in search for more opportunities. She later expanded her business to include Veekee James Man, a fashion brand for men's wears and Shoprikan, for women.

In 2022, she won the AMVCA and the Hercomony Awards as the Best Fashion Designer of the year. In 2023, she won three awards including the Future Awards Africa. In February 2023, she organized her first masterclass that helped over 100 fashion creatives from different countries develop their skills. In March 2023, she launched her podcast ‘Bible Stories With Veekee James’.

== Discography ==
=== Singles ===
- Olugbeja (2023)
- Nothing Less (2023)

== Awards and recognition ==
Year	Title	Category	Result	Ref
2021	Sugar Awards	Fashion Stylist of the Year	Won	
2022	AMVCA	Best Designer Award	Won	
2022	Herconomy Awards	Fashion Designer of the Year	Won	
2023	The Future Awards Africa	Prize for Fashion	Won	
2023	Readers Choice Awards	Best Celebrity Stylist	Won	
2023	La Mode Awards	Bridal Fashion Designer Brand of the Year	Won	

== Personal life ==
In October 2023, Veekee James announced her marriage to Femi Atere on social media. In February 2024, they had their traditional wedding in Akwa Ibom State, and a vintage-themed white wedding ceremony in Lagos, Nigeria.

Veekee James and her husband welcomed their baby girl on 2nd May, 2026

== See also ==
- List of Nigerian entrepreneurs
