= Trendupp Awards =

Nigerian award ceremony

- Current: Trendupp Awards 2025
- Awarded for: Outstanding achievements in the social media community
- Country: Nigeria / Africa
- Presented by: Trendupp Africa
- First award: 4 July 2021; 5 years ago
- Website: www.trenduppawards.com www.trendupp.com

Trendupp Awards is an annual awards ceremony that recognizes achievements in the social media community across Nigeria and Africa. It honors content creators, influencers, brands, and organizations that have made contributions to the Nigerian and African social media landscape through innovations, campaigns, projects, and content. Trendupp Awards is organized by Trendupp Africa in association with DottsMediaHouse, both organisations founded by Tiwalola Olanubi.

== History ==
The Trendupp Awards, themed annually as 'The Force of Influence,' were established in 2021 to recognize achievements in the Nigerian social media space. These awards primarily recognize content creators, influencers, and brands for their impact on the social media community through content, projects, and engaging campaigns on platforms such as Instagram, TikTok, YouTube, Twitter, and Facebook. In its inaugural edition in 2021, the awards received approximately 91,000 nominations across sixteen categories, with 96 nominees and sixteen winners. The event had a virtual audience of over a hundred thousand attendees from across Nigeria. The first edition was hosted by Timini Egbuson.

The second edition took place on Sunday, June 12th, 2022, at the Monarch event center in Lekki, Lagos. Content creator and TV host Kie Kie hosted the event. The host generated headlines when she appeared to fall off the stage during the awards, later revealed to be a prank. Winners of the second edition received $1000 cash prizes, while the winner of the "emerging force" category, the only voting category, received a cash prize of $1,500.

The third edition was held on Sunday, July 9th, 2023, at Balmoral Hall, Federal Palace Hotel, Victoria Island, Lagos. The edition received over 200,000 nominations across sixteen categories. Mikano Motors presented a brand new car to the "Force of Influence" Winner, Mr. Macaroni. Other partners included Pepsi Nigeria, McVitie’s Nigeria, Tramango, and Cliqki Technologies, with media partners such as MTV Base and more. Past winners include Broda Shaggi, Anita Natacha Akide, Ikorodu Bois, Lasisi Elenu, Taaooma, Benjamin Hundeyin, Mark Angel, Fisayo Fosudo, Amazing Klef, Denola Grey, Aproko Doctor, Phyna, and Sheggz, all of whom have made significant contributions to the Nigerian social media landscape.

The fourth and fifth editions were held on Sunday, July 7th, 2024 and July 13th, 2025 at Balmoral Hall, Federal Palace Hotel, Victoria Island, Lagos, with TV host Kie Kie returning as host both times. As part of the activities leading up to the fifth edition and in celebration of the milestone edition, a free masterclass tagged TrenduppX was organised in collaboration with the Lagos State Government (Tourism, Arts and Culture), where over 200 aspiring creators were equipped with insights, tools, and cash prizes to support their journey as creators. At the 2025 main event, creators like Veekee James, Tomike Adeoye, Peller & Jadrolita, Folagade Banks, and Liquorose all emerged as part of the FORCES OF 2025.

=== Rules ===
The Trendupp Awards employ a no-voting system, with winners selected each year by a jury of industry leaders, headed by Iyinoluwa Aboyeji. Winners in each category are determined by the jury based on three criteria: creativity, consistency, and engagement. Nominations are open to the general public for the first three editions.

== Categories ==
=== Force of Influence ===
The Force of Influence is a prominent category in the Trendupp Awards, recognizing the influencer or content creator who had the greatest impact on the Nigerian social media space during the relevant year. Iyabo Ojo was the first winner of this category; Mr. Macaroni won this award in the second and third editions. In 2023, the organizers presented the category winner with a new car. Kie Kie emerged the category winner in 2024, while Veekee James beat five other leading creators to emerge winner in 2025.

=== Other categories ===
The Trendupp Awards feature a number of additional categories:

- The Force of YouTube
- The Force of TikTok
- The Force of Twitter
- The Force of Instagram
- The Force of Virality
- The Force of Food Content
- The Force of Online Sensation
- The Force of Social Good
- The Force of Tech
- The Force of Comedy Skits
- The Force of Blogging
- The Force of Lifestyle Content
- The Force of Creative Arts
- The Force of Wellness
- The Force of Collaboration
- Emerging Force
- Force of Influence (Regional)
- Force of Influence (Nigeria)

== Ceremonies ==
Edition	Date	Venue	Biggest category winner	Sponsor/partner	Ref
1st	July 4th, 2021	Marriot Hotel	Iyabo Ojo – Force of Influence, 2021	Pepsi	
2nd	June 12th, 2022	Monarch Event Centre	Mr Macaroni – Force of Influence, 2022	Chipper Cash & Pepsi	
3rd	July 9th, 2023	Federal Palace Hotel	Mr Macaroni – Force of Influence, 2023	Mikano Motors & Pepsi	
4th	July 7th, 2024	Federal Palace Hotel	Kie Kie – Force of Influence, 2024	Pepsi	
5th	July 13th, 2025	Federal Palace Hotel	Veekee James – Force of Influence, 2025	Pepsi, Sycamore & Lagos State Government	
