= Zulumoke Oyibo =

Nigerian producer and entrepreneur

- Born: Zulumoke
- Occupations: Executive Producer, Director
- Notable work: A Lagos Love Story, Muri and Ko, The Betrayed

Zulumoke Oyibo is a Nigerian film producer, director, media executive and co-founder of Inkblot Productions, a film and television production company based in Nigeria. Since 2015, she has produced and executive-produced numerous commercially successful and critically acclaimed Nollywood films. In 2024, she made her directorial debut with The Betrayed, a psychological thriller. Oyibo was featured in Variety's Women's Impact Report in 2022.

== Early life and education ==
Oyibo developed an interest in storytelling and film from a young age. She earned a degree in law and was called to the Nigerian Bar after completing her studies at the Nigerian Law School between 2008 and 2009. Her legal background provided her with strategic and analytical skills that later contributed to her success in film production and entertainment entrepreneurship.

== Career ==
=== Inkblot Productions ===
In 2010, Oyibo co-founded Inkblot Productions alongside Chinaza Onuzo, Damola Ademola, and Omotayo Adeola. The company quickly became one of the most influential studios in Nollywood, known for creating genre-diverse films that appeal to both domestic and international audiences. Inkblot has produced over 23 theatrical releases and multiple TV projects, many of which have ranked among the highest-grossing Nigerian films. Notable productions include The Wedding Party (2016), which became the highest-grossing Nollywood film at the time and was selected for the Toronto International Film Festival (TIFF), as well as The Arbitration, The Set Up, Day of Destiny, and The Blood Covenant.

In December 2021, Inkblot signed deal exclusive output deal with Amazon Prime Video—the first of its kind in Africa—and also produced Netflix's first Nigerian original young adult series Far From Home, released in 2022.

== Directorial debut ==
In 2024, Oyibo made her directorial debut with The Betrayed, a psychological thriller exploring themes of secrets, betrayal, and emotional reckoning. The film stars Uche Montana, Gabriel Afolayan, Adunni Ade, Ibrahim Suleiman, Jemima Osunde, Vine Olugu, and Stephanie Zibili. With this debut, Oyibo became the third Inkblot co-founder to direct a feature film, following Ademola and Onuzo in expanding their creative contributions beyond producing.

== Advocacy and initiatives ==
Zulumoke initiated The Inkblot Women In Film (IWIF) which aims to empower women working in the Nigerian film industry through mentorship, visibility, and advocacy. She is also a co-host of Inkblot’s Meet & Greet, a podcast that features interviews with notable figures in Nigerian entertainment and offers industry insights for aspiring creatives and entrepreneurs.

== Recognition ==
Zulumoke's contributions to Nigerian cinema have earned her several honors, including a feature in Variety's 2022 Women's Impact Report, which spotlighted influential women making global strides in film and media. She was also recognized by the Nigerian International Film Summit and the Lagos State Ministry of Tourism, Arts and Culture as part of the Eko Star Film and TV Awards for her achievements in advancing Nollywood.

== Filmography ==
- The Department (2015)
  - Out of Luck (2015)
  - The Wedding Party (2016)
  - The Arbitration (2016)
  - My Wife and I (2017)
  - The Wedding Party 2 (2017)
  - New Money (2018)
  - Moms at War (2018)
  - Up North (2018)
  - The Set Up 1 & 2 (2019, 2021)
  - Love Is War (2019)
  - Quam’s Money (2020)
  - Charge and Bail (2021)
  - Superstar (2021)
  - The Blood Covenant (2022)
  - The Perfect Arrangement (2022)
  - Palava (2022)
  - Far From Home (2022)
  - No Way Through (2023)
  - 840 Days (2022)
  - The Betrayed (2024)
  - Saving Onome (2024)
  - Muri and Ko (2024)
  - When Love Strikes (2024)
  - Family Gbese (2024)
  - A Lagos Love Story (2025)

=== As Director ===
The Betrayed (2024)
