= Who's the Boss (2020 film) =

2020 Nigerian romantic comedy film

Who's The Boss
- Promotional poster
- Directed by: Chinaza Onuzo
- Screenplay by: Chinaza Onuzo
- Story by: Chinaza Onuzo
- Produced by: Chinaza Onuzo
- Starring: Sharon Ooja; Funke Akindele; Blossom Chukwujekwu; Chris Akwarandu; Gbenga Alabi; Gbubemi Ejeye; Blessing Jessica Obasi-Nze Dorcas Paul
- Production company: Inkblot Productions
- Release date: 28 February 2020
- Running time: 130 minutes
- Country: Nigeria
- Language: English
- Box office: ₦38.5million

Who's The Boss is a 2020 Nigerian romantic comedy film produced, written, and directed by Chinaza Onuzo (Naz Onuzo) in his directorial debut. The film stars Sharon Ooja, Funke Akindele and Blossom Chukwujekwu in the lead roles. It premiered on 16 February 2020 in Lagos. The film was released theatrically on 28 February 2020 and received positive reviews, becoming a box office success.

== Synopsis ==
Liah is a young, overtasked advertising agency executive who is forced to invent a boss to prevent her employer from finding out when her side-hustle startup advertising agency wins a major deal. Things go from bad to worse as she becomes increasingly successful and resorts to ludicrous ways to conceal the truth from her real boss.

== Cast ==
- Sharon Ooja as Liah
- Funke Akindele as Hauwa
- Blossom Chukwujekwu as Lekan
- Ini Dima-Okojie as Jumoke
- Segun Arinze as Tunde
- Beverly Osu as Dream Girl
- Gbolahan Olatunde as Francis
- Tayo Faniran as Dream Guy
- Patrick Edobor as Tunde's Friend
- Taiwo Familoni as George Thompson
- Dolly Ohaneye as Beer Marketing Executive
- Osazee Ovis as Nurse
- Chris Akwarandu as Apex Chief Counsel
- Gbenga Alabi as Cars Marketing Executive
- Gbubemi Ejeye as Pretty Woman 1
- Blessing Jessica Obasi-Nze as Pizza Marketing Executive
- Dorcas Paul as Pretty Woman 2

== Production ==
Co-founder of Inkblot Productions, Chinaza Onuzo, who is well known for his credits as a writer for notable films such as The Wedding Party 2, New Money and The Set Up made his directorial debut through this film, and he announced it on his Instagram account. This film was the 12th film to be produced under the production banner Inkblot Productions. The official teaser of the film was unveiled on 10 January 2020.

== See also ==
IMDb
