= List of Nigerian films of 2018 =

This is a list of Nigerian films scheduled for theatrical release in 2018.

== 2018 ==
=== January–March ===
Opening		Title	Director	Cast	Genre	Studio	Ref.
J A N U A R Y	3	The Vendor	Odunlade Adekola	Odunlade Adekola; Adunni Ade; Jide Kosoko; Eniola Ajao	Drama film		
J A N U A R Y	4	Ehi's Bitters	Biodun Stephen	Fathia Balogun; Deyemi Okanlawon; Enado Odigie; Debby Felix	Drama film	ShutterSpeed Projects	
F E B R U A R Y	12	King of Boys	Kemi Adetiba	Adesua Etomi; Omoni Oboli; Jide Kosoko; Sola Sobowale; Osas Ighodaro	Romantic Drama	Kemi Adetiba Virtuals	
M A R C H	23	New Money	Tope Oshin Ogun	Kate Henshaw; Dakore Akande; Jemima Osunde; Blossom Chukwujekwu; Osas Ighodaro	Comedy Drama film	Inkblot Productions; FilmOne	

=== April–June ===
Opening		Title	Director	Cast	Genre	Studio	Ref.
A P R I L	24	Lionheart	Genevieve Nnaji	Genevieve Nnaji; Nkem Owoh; Pete Edochie; Kanayo O. Kanayo	Drama	Netflix; MPM Premium	
J U N E	15	Boss of All Bosses	Ike Nnaebue	Patience Ozokwor; Adunni Ade; Akpororo; Bishop Imeh	Comedy		
M A Y	11	Ghost and the Tout	Charles Uwagbai	Toyin Abraham; Rachael Okonkwo; Lasisi Elenu; Omowunmi Dada	Ghost		

=== July–December ===
Opening		Title	Director	Cast	Genre	Studio	Ref.
S E P T E M B E R	14	What Just Happened	Charles Uwagbai	Ufuoma McDermott; Omoni Oboli; Toyin Abraham; Mike Ezuruonye	Comedy	The USM Company	
S E P T E M B E R	21	Sylvia (2018 film)	Daniel Orhiari	Chris Attoh; Zainab Balogun; Ini Dima-Okojie; Ijeoma Grace Agu; Bolaji Ogunmola	Thriller drama film	Trino Motion Pictures	
N O V E M B E R	24	Merry Men: The Real Yoruba Demons	Toka Mcbaror	Ayo Makun; Folarin Falana; Ramsey Nouah; Osas Ighodaro; Lilian Esoro	Romantic comedy		
D E C E M B E R	14	Chief Daddy	Niyi Akinmolayan	Joke Silva Kate Henshaw Funke Akindele Folarin Falana (Falz) Mawuli Gavor	Comedy Drama	Ebony Life Films	
D E C E M B E R	15	Up North	Tope Oshin Ogun	Rahama Sadau; Kanayo O. Kanayo; Adesua Etomi; Banky Wellington	Romantic drama film	Anakle Films	

== See also ==
- 2018 in Nigeria
- List of Nigerian films
