= Uzor Osimkpa =

Nigerian actress

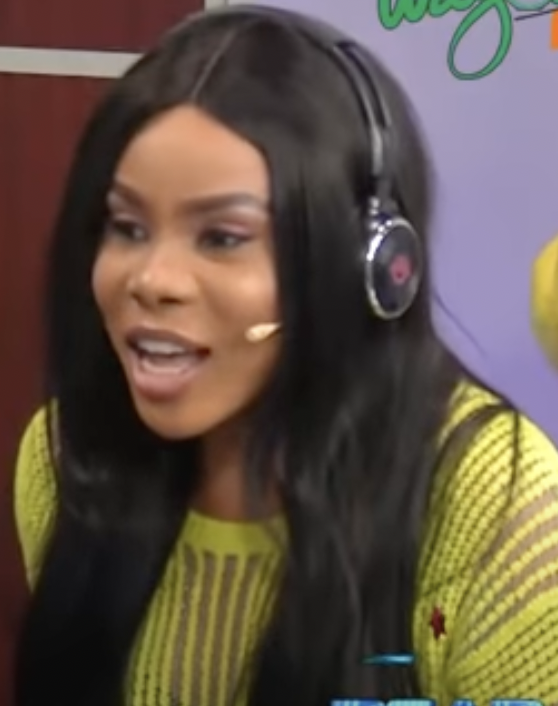
- Born: Uzoma Osimkpa; Lagos State
- Other names: Okwuchi
- Education: Bachelor's degree in Economics Education, Abia State University
- Alma mater: Abia State University
- Years active: 2004– till date

Uzoma Okwuchi Osimkpa // is a Nigerian Actor popularly known as Uzor Osimkpa. She emerged 5th in the 2012 Gulder Ultimate Search season 9.

== Biography ==
Osimkpa earned a bachelor's degree in economics education from Abia State University, Nigeria.

=== Career ===
Osimkpa's acting career started in 2004 when she featured in the film Shallow Waters. In 2005, she was featured in the BBC World Service Trust test series Wetin dey. The TV series Do Good and Hustle made her more prominent. Subsequently, she has featured in films and TV series which includes Tinsel, The Maze, Flatmate, Edge of Paradise, Doctors Quarters, amongst others.

Osimkpa contested and emerged fifth in the 2012 Gulder Ultimate Search. She was however eliminated after breaking a rule by removing the shameful stump from her leg as punishment for finishing last in the final challenge titled 'Wave your Flag'.

== Filmography ==
Films
Year	Title	Role	Genre	Selected cast	Ref
2023	The Black Book	Adaobi	Thriller	Richard Mofe- Damijo Ade Laoye Sam Dede Shaffy Bello	
2023	A Sunday Affair	Kelechi	Romance	Oris Erhuero Dakore Akande Moses Akerele	
2022	The Set Up 2	Imade	Drama Crime	Grace Abah Oyindamola Adewale Lilian Afegbai	
2021	Detour		Thriller	Monalisa Chinda Kanayo O. Kanayo Jemima Osunde	
2020	Omambala	Azuka	Thriller	Sola Sobowale; Jim Iyke; Nancy Isime; Angela Nwosu	
2020	No more Secrets	Alero	Drama	Ifeanyi Kalu Anthony Monjaro Kyle Remi	
2019	Love is War	Linda		Shaffy Bello; Yemi Blaq; Femi Branch; Omoni Oboli; Jide Kosoko; Richard Mofe-Damijo	
2019	My Neighbour	Claire	Drama	Tana Adelana; Teco Benson; Mofe Duncan; Kevin Bosco	
2018	Just Before I Do		Drama	Shaffy Bello; Judith Bello; Hafiz Oyetoro; Kunle Popoola	
2017	Dance to My Beat	Chacha	Romance; Comedy	Toyin Abraham; Lillian Afegbai; Kehinde Bankole; Joseph Benjamin	
2015	Fifty	Sade	Drama Romance	Iretiola Doyle Nse Ikpe-Etim Omoni Oboli Wale Ojo	
2014	Oblivious	Sarah	Short drama	Deyemi Okanlawon; Kiki Omeili	
2014	Love, Lies & Alibi		Drama	Omowunmi Dada; Felix Imhokodion	

TV Series
Year	Title	Role	Genre	Selected cast	Ref
2017	Fifty	Sade	Drama; Romance	Dakore Akande; Iretiola Doyle; Timini Egbuson; Linda Osifo	
2015	Desperate House Girls	Ada	Comedy; Romance	Bimbo Ademoye; Ini Edo; Uzor Arukwe; Belinda Effah; Ufuoma McDermott	
2014	Taste of Love	Getrude Rhodes			
2008	Tinsel		Drama	Stan Nze; Osas Ighodaro; Kalu Ikeagwu	

== Accolades ==
In 2017 Uzor was nominated for City People Movies Awards category – The Best Upcoming Actress in an English film. She emerged fifth in the 2012 Gulder Ultimate Search, which was held at Usaka, Obot Akara, Akwa Ibom State.
