= Ayamma (name) =

Ayamma may refer to:

- An Ibibio female given name meaning "love" or "will you love me?"
- Ayamma, a 2016 Nigerian film
