= Ben & Ara =

2014 Jamaican documentary film

- Directed by: Nnegest Likké
- Written by: Joseph Baird
- Starring: Joseph Baird; Constance Ejuma; Akuyoe Graham; Q'orianka Kilcher; Michael Chieffo; William Mark McCullough
- Cinematography: David M. Rakoczy
- Edited by: Jason Stoy
- Music by: Ram Khatabakhsh
- Production companies: Nursing Tybalt Productions; Wonder Worthy Productions; N-Vision Pictures
- Release date: September 2015 (USA)
- Running time: 87 minutes
- Countries: United States; Cameroon
- Language: English

Ben & Ara, is a 2015 United States–Cameroon romantic drama film directed by Nnegest Likké and co-produced by Joseph Baird, Constance Ejuma, Q'orianka Kilcher, Matthew Norsworthy and Samone Norsworthy for Nursing Tybalt Productions, Wonder Worthy Productions and N-Vision Pictures. The film revolves around two Ph.D. candidates, one an African Muslim and the other an agnostic, where they begin a romance after meeting at a museum but later discover that a love between different cultures and religions may have consequences.

The film stars Joseph Baird and Constance Ejuma in lead roles, with Akuyoe Graham, Q'orianka Kilcher, Michael Chieffo and William Mark McCullough in supporting roles. The film received positive reviews and won several awards as well as screened at international film festivals. It had its premiere in September 2015 at the Miami Independent Film Festival. In 2016, the film won the awards for Best Picture and Best Actress at the Indie Film Festival. Main actress Constance Ejuma won the Best Actress Award at the Nevada Women's Film Festival. In 2016, the film won the award for Best Diaspora film at the African Movie Academy Awards (AMAA).

== Cast ==
- Joseph Baird as Ben
- Constance Ejuma as Ara
- Akuyoe Graham as Quismah
- Q'orianka Kilcher as Gabrielle
- Michael Chieffo as Professor Hayes
- William Mark McCullough as Manny
- Momo Dione as Najeeb
- Emily Saliers as Andrea
- Craig Michael Beck as Frank
- Mildred Aldaya as Sasha
- Elizabeth Brewster as Secretary 2
- Haley Craft as Maxine
- Kristian Nicole Jackson as Secretary 1
- Julie Kessler as Doctor
- Austin Martin as Nnegest Likke'
- Charlotte Norsworthy as Jessica
- Samone Norsworthy as Lana
- Nital Patel as Professor Chopra
- James W. Ryder as Ken
- Dustin Seabolt as Vaughn
- Pepi Streiff as Female Professor (voice)
- Ryan Surratt as Mark Chatham
- Alyssa Taylor as Carol
- Ben Youcef as Johnnie
