= Theresa Edem =

Nigerian actress (born 1986)

Theresa Edem Isemin
- Born: Theresa Emmanuel Edem; 6 January 1986 (age 40); Uyo, Akwa Ibom, Nigeria
- Other names: Theresa Isemin; Theresa Edem
- Education: St. Mary's Science College, Abak; Federal University of Technology Owerri (FUTO) (Bs.Tech.)
- Occupation: Actress
- Years active: 2013 – Present
- Spouse: Ubong Isemin (m. 2015)
- Website: theresaedem.com

Theresa Edem Isemin (born 6 January 1986) is a Nigerian actress and filmmaker. She won the Best Actress in a Feature Film award at the Las Vegas Black Film Festival and has been nominated for several awards, including the African Movie Academy Awards.

Greater success came to her career after her performance on Tinsel, and she has since gone on to star in several films and TV series, including Ayamma: Music in the Forest, My Village People, Forbidden and The Olive.

== Early life and education ==
Isemin was born in Uyo, Akwa Ibom State into a family of four children, of which she is the fourth and only girl. She attended primary and secondary school in Akwa Ibom before proceeding to the Federal University of Technology, Owerri, where she earned a degree in Animal Science and Technology.

== Career ==
Isemin started acting professionally in 2012, after completing an acting course at the Royal Arts Academy. Her first major role was in After The Proposal, starring alongside Uche Jombo, Anthony Monjaro, Patience Ozokwor, Desmond Elliot and Belinda Effah. Following that, she starred in several films, TV series and stage plays, including The Antique, Tinsel and Twenty-Five. She has also featured in a number of Africa Magic Original Films.

Her cinema debut was in the 2016 epic, Ayamma. She was also in the movie My Village People alongside Bovi and Nkem Owoh.

== Personal life ==
In December 2015, she married her friend of many years, Ubong Isemin. The ceremony was held in Uyo.

== Filmography ==
=== Film ===
Year	Title	Role	Notes
2024	KM17	Ada	Alongside Toni Tones, Blossom Chukwujekwu
2021	Country Hard	Fadeke	Alongside Kehinde Bankole, Tope Tedela
2021	My Village People	Haggai	Alongside Bovi and Nkem Owoh
2020	Honey & Sweet Stuff	Kesandu	Alongside Yemi Blaq, Nse Ikpe-Etim
2018	Mr. Perfect	Rachael	Alongside Sylvester Kalu, Frederick Leonard
2017	Loving Daniella	Daniella	Feature film
2017	Stormy Hearts	Kachi	Feature film produced by Judith Audu. Released June, 2017.
2016	Ayamma: Music in the Forest	Princess Ama	Feature film - produced by Emem Isong and The Royal Arts Academy. Released December, 2016
2016	Betrayal	Nneka	Feature film produced by Darasen Richards. Released on Ibakatv, December 2016.
2016	A Girl's Note	Muna	Feature film produced by Chidinma Uzodike. Released on Ibakatv, September 2016
2015	Trapped	Furo	Feature film. Released on IrokoTV, 2015
2015	Baker's Daughter	Motunde	Africa Magic Original Film. Released 2015.
2015	While We Worked Things Out	Kemi	Africa Magic Original Film. Released 2015.
2015	Behind The Scenes	Ekaette	Africa Magic Original Film. Released 2015.
2014	The Antique	Princess	A Darasen Richards film. Released 2014.
2013	After The Proposal	Betty	Feature film - produced by Emem Isong and The Royal Arts Academy. Released 2013.

=== Television ===
Year	Title	Role	Notes
2021	The Heiress	Uyai	TV series, aired on Iroko TV.
2018	Forbidden	Enitan	TV series, aired on Africa Magic.
2015	Hotel Majestic	Isioma	TV series, aired on Africa Magic.
2014	Tinsel	Angela	TV series, aired on Africa Magic.

=== Web ===
Year	Title	Role	Notes
2021	The Olive	Ehi	Web series, aired on Accelerate TV.
2018	Room 420	Tolani	Produced by Black Studios Pictures
2017	Sandra's Cross	Sandra	Produced by YouthHub Africa, UNFPA Nigeria, Young Men Network Against Sexual and Gender-Based Violence

=== Stage ===
Year	Title	Role	Company
2013	Twenty-Five	-	Royal Arts Academy

=== Radio ===
Year	Title	Role	Notes
2013	MTV Shuga Radio	Patricia	Produced by Shuga

== Awards and nominations ==
Year	Award	Category	Film	Result
2018	Las Vegas Black Film Festival	Best Actress in a Feature Film	Loving Daniella	Won
2017	Nigerian Entertainment Awards (NEAA)	Best Supporting Actress	Ayamma: Music in the Forest	Nominated
2017	African Movie Academy Awards (AMAA)	Best Supporting Actress	Ayamma: Music in the Forest	Nominated
2016	African Film Academy Awards	Best Supporting Actress	Betrayal	Nominated
