= The Tribunal (2017 film) =

2017 Nigerian film

- Directed by: Kunle Afolayan
- Produced by: Kunle Afolayan
- Starring: Damilola Ogunsi; Bimbo Manuel; Norbert Young; Omotola Jalade Ekeinde; Carol King; Funsho Adeolu
- Production company: Golden Effects Pictures
- Release dates: 1 September 2017 (Nigeria, Ghana)
- Country: Nigeria
- Language: English

The Tribunal is a 2017 Nigerian film directed and produced by Kunle Afolayan under the production studio of Golden Effects Pictures. The movie aimed at raising the unjust discrimination faced by albinos in Africa, starring Damilola Ogunsi, Bimbo Manuel, Nobert Young, Omotola Jalade-Ekeinde, Caroline King, and Funsho Adeolu.

== Synopsis ==
The movie revolves around an albino who is wrongly sacked by a bank because of his physical appearance. He approached a law school graduate who also seeks the help of Jimi Disu, a once famous lawyer who has become a charge and Bail attorney. The movie became tense when Jimi Disu had to battle for his client, his old firm, his friends, and the redemption of his law career.

== Premiere ==
The Tribunal was premiered across cinemas in Nigeria and Ghana on 1 September 2017.

== Cast ==
- Omotola Jalade-Ekeinde
- Funsho Adeolu
- Bimbo Manuel
- Norbert Young
- Carol King
- Ade Laoye
- Damilola Ogunsi
