= Chika Lann =

Nigerian filmmaker and model

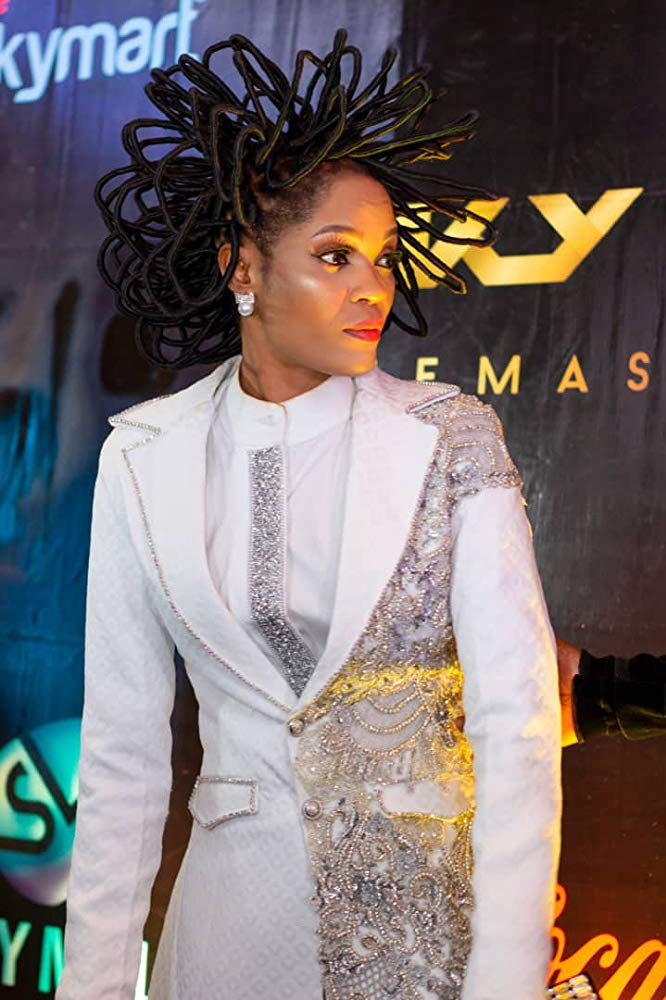
- Education: University of Geneva
- Occupations: film producer, actress, model, television personality
- Known for: The Millions

Chika Lann is a Nigerian filmmaker, actress, former model, and television personality. She became a controversial figure over her remarks about cost and maintaining her hairstyle. She made her Nollywood debut as a producer for the 2019 film The Millions.

== Early life ==
Chika pursued higher studies in France and in Switzerland after completing her primary education in Nigeria. She graduated from the University of Geneva and studied image consultancy at Sterling Style Academy. After completing her studies, she pursued a modeling career in Paris. She has modeled for popular designer brand Bretz. She then returned to Nigeria to enter the television industry. She initiated a successful reality TV show, The Expatriate Wives.

== Controversies ==
She was sidelined for her controversial remarks on her hairstyle and publicity. In 2018, she became an internet sensation after claiming that her avant-garde hair costs her 40 million naira. The comments were slammed as an attempt to get attention.

She also received criticism after uploading videos of her giving a cheque to a sweeper. However, she revealed that her team of filmmakers persuaded her to upload the videos in order to motivate others to do good things.
