= Radio Voice =

2025 Nigerian film

- Theatrical release poster
- Directed by: Isioma Osaje
- Written by: Ufuoma Metitiri; Isioma Osaje
- Produced by: Richard Mofe-Damijo; Yolande Okereke; Blessing Jessica Obasi
- Starring: Richard Mofe-Damijo; Timini Egbuson; Nancy Isime; Deyemi Okanlawon; Idowu Diyaolu; Babalola El-Imam; Somto Eze; Okey Jude; Kelechi Benwosely Kachikwu; Shina Ogunjumelo; Tony Onyemekeihia
- Production company: RMD Productions
- Distributed by: Nile Entertainment
- Release date: 11 April 2025
- Running time: 93 minutes
- Country: Nigeria

Radio Voice is a 2025 Nigerian drama film written by Ufuoma Metitiri and Isioma Osaje and produced by Richard Mofe-Damijo, marking his production debut. It is co-produced by Yolande Okereke and Blessing Jessica Obasi. The film stars Richard Mofe-Damijo, Nancy Isime, Deyemi Okanlawon, Timini Egbuson, Blessing Obasi, Nse Ikpe-Etim and others. It is a story of second chances, exploring how a sex worker transformed and saved a struggling radio station on the verge of closing down. Mofe-Damijo, during the premiere, had described Radio Voice as a "labour of love" and a "triumph of the human spirit over adversity". The film came to light as a result of a partnership Mofe-Damijo secured through his production company, RMD Production, with Nile Entertainment to distribute two films, Radio Voice being one of them. It was theatrically released on 11 April 2025.

== Plot summary ==
Radio Voice tells the story of a former sex worker who joins a struggling radio station as an on-air personality with the hope of having a second chance at life. Unfortunately, her past begins to haunt her both emotionally and professionally as she faces workplace politics and disrespect from people around her.

== Selected cast ==
- Richard Mofe-Damijo as Karo
- Nancy Isime as Uche
- Timini Egbuson as Hakeem
- Deyemi Okanlawon as Andy
- Damilola Adegbite as Blessing
- Blossom Chukwujekwu as Bros J
- Nse Ikpe-Etim as Mayowa
- Somto Eze as Benji
- Idowu Diyaolu as Police officer
- Babalola El-Imam as Police officer
- Somto Eze as Benji
- Okey Jude as Chidi
- Kelechi Benwosely Kachikwu as Headmistress
- Shina Ogunjumelo as Isaac
- Tony Onyemekeihia as Deji

== Release and distribution ==
Ahead of Radio Voice's release on 11 April 2025, the producer, Richard Mofe-Damijo, personally visited the Vice President of Nigeria, Kashim Shettima, and invited him to the premiere while telling him about the film. In response, Shettima affirmed his support for Nigeria's thriving creative space and pledged to attend the premiere.

Globacom, a Nigerian telecommunications company, sponsored the film's premiere, highlighting its longstanding relationship with Richard Mofe-Damijo and the creative industry at large.

== See also ==
IMDb
