= Love Is War (2019 film) =

2019 Nigerian comedy drama film

Love is War
- Release poster
- Directed by: Omoni Oboli
- Screenplay by: Chinaza Onuzo
- Produced by: Omoni Oboli; Chinaza Onuzo
- Starring: Omoni Oboli; Richard Mofe-Damijo; Jide Kosoko; Akin Lewis; Bimbo Manuel; Toke Makinwa; Shaffy Bello; Femi Branch; Uzor Osimkpa; Yemi Blaq; Damilare Kuku; William Benson
- Production companies: Inkblot Productions; Dioni Visions
- Release date: 27 September 2019 (Nigeria)
- Country: Nigeria
- Language: English

Love is War is a 2019 Nigerian political drama film directed by Omoni Oboli and written by Chinaza Onuzo. It stars Oboli, Richard Mofe-Damijo, Jide Kosoko, Akin Lewis, Bimbo Manuel, Toke Makinwa, Shaffy Bello, Femi Branch, Uzor Osimkpa, Yemi Blaq, Damilare Kuku and William Benson. Produced by Inkblot Productions and Dioni Visions, Love Is War is the second collaboration between the two production companies following 2018's Moms at War. The film is centered around a married couple who run against each other for governor in the same state.

== Cast ==
- Omoni Oboli as Hankuri Philips
- Richard Mofe-Damijo as Dimeji Phillips
- Jide Kosoko as Otunba Odeleye
- Akin Lewis as Governor
- Bimbo Manuel as Apostle
- Toke Makinwa as Yinka the Reporter
- Shaffy Bello as Senator Akerele
- Femi Branch as Chudi
- Uzor Osimkpa as Linda
- Yemi Blaq as Kayode Ajibola
- Damilare Kuku as Ndana
- William Benson as Tunde Aina
- Genoveva Umeh as Young Lady
- Chris Iheuwa as Engineer Obaseki

== Production ==
Love is War is a joint production between Oboli's Dioni Visions and Onuzo's Inkblot Productions. It was written by Onuzo, who previously worked on films such as The Wedding Party, New Money, Up North and The Set Up. The film explores the themes of love, family and ambition. Oboli announced on Instagram that filming for the movie commenced in May 2019. She also revealed that Richard Mofe-Damijo had joined the cast. In an interview with Pulse Nigeria in September 2019, Mofe-Damijo said he accepted his role because he loved the precedent upon which the film is set. He also said his political affiliation in real life helped him portray the role better. Moreover, Mofe-Damijo revealed that shooting was tedious due to the filming of night scenes.

== Release ==
Love is War premiered at the Filmhouse Cinemas in Lekki on 22 September 2019. It was released across cinemas in Nigeria on 27 September. A teaser of the film was released a month earlier. Guests who attended the premiere include Ayo Makun, Funke Akindele, Toke Makinwa, Sharon Ooja, Alex Ekubo, Inidima Okojie, Mercy Aigbe, Tope Oshin and Sophie Alakija, among others.
