= Palava (2022 film) =

- Directed by: Niyi Akinmolayan
- Written by: Anee Icha; Chinaza Onuzo
- Starring: Richard Mofe-Damijo; Iyabo Ojo; Bisola Aiyeola; Mercy Aigbe; Beverly Naya; Beverly Osu
- Music by: Tolu Obanro
- Production companies: Inkblot Productions; FilmOne Entertainment
- Release date: 9 December 2022 (Nigeria)
- Country: Nigeria
- Language: English

Palava is a 2022 Nigerian family comedy film produced by Inkblot Productions in conjunction with FilmOne Entertainment. The film stars Richard Mofe-Damijo, Bisola Aiyeola, Iyabo Ojo, Mercy Aigbe, Beverly Naya, Beverly Osu, Neo Akpofure, Chinedu Ikedieze, Segun Arinze, and Eniola Badmus. It was released in cinemas on 9 December 2022.

== Synopsis ==
Osa Wonda is a highlife musician and renowned artiste who loves women, and has five daughters. His life and family take a turn when a scandal emerges on the eve of his 60th birthday.

== Selected cast ==
- Richard Mofe-Damijo as Osa Wonda
- Beverly Naya as Charlie
- Bisola Aiyeola as Imade
- Iyabo Ojo as Oma Bassey
- Mercy Aigbe as Hajara
- Neo Akpofure as Malik
- Beverly Osu as Ehi
- Eniola Badmus as Iya Oloja
- Chinedu Ikedieze as Big T
- Jemima Osunde as Itohan

== Production and release ==
Palava, the twentieth film produced by Inkblot Productions, was directed by Niyi Akinmolayan and released in Nigerian cinemas on 9 December 2022. Its premiere took place on 27 November 2022 as an ankara-themed event, attended by actors from the film as well as other celebrities, including Nancy Isime, Sharon Ooja, and Ruth Kadiri.
