= Toke Makinwa =

Nigerian media personality (born 1984)

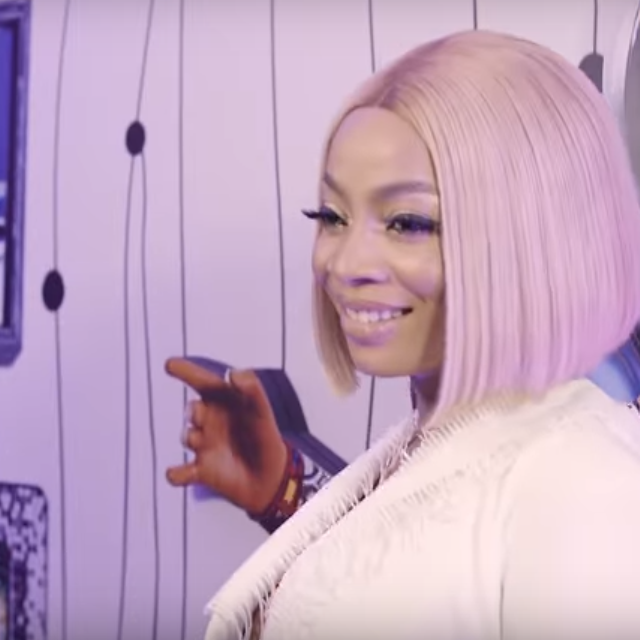
- November 2018 GTBank Fashion Weekend Cocktail Party led by en:Jemima Osunde and Toke Makinwa
- Born: 3 November 1984 (age 42); Lagos State
- Education: University of Lagos
- Occupations: Radio personality; television host; vlogger; entrepreneur; author; actor
- Years active: 2010–present
- Spouse: Maje Ayida (m. 2014–2017)
- Children: 1
- Website: Official website

Toke Makinwa (born 3 November 1984) is a Nigerian radio personality, television host, vlogger, entrepreneur, actress, author, and fashion influencer. Makinwa is known for hosting The Late Morning Show on Rhythm 93.7 FM and for her YouTube vlog series Toke Moments. She released her book On Becoming in November 2016, and is one of the top five African female show hosts.

== Early life and education ==
Toke Makinwa was born on 3 November 1984, in Lagos State, Nigeria. She attended the Federal Government Girls' College in Oyo State, and later enrolled at the University of Lagos, where she earned a BA degree in English and Literature

== Career ==
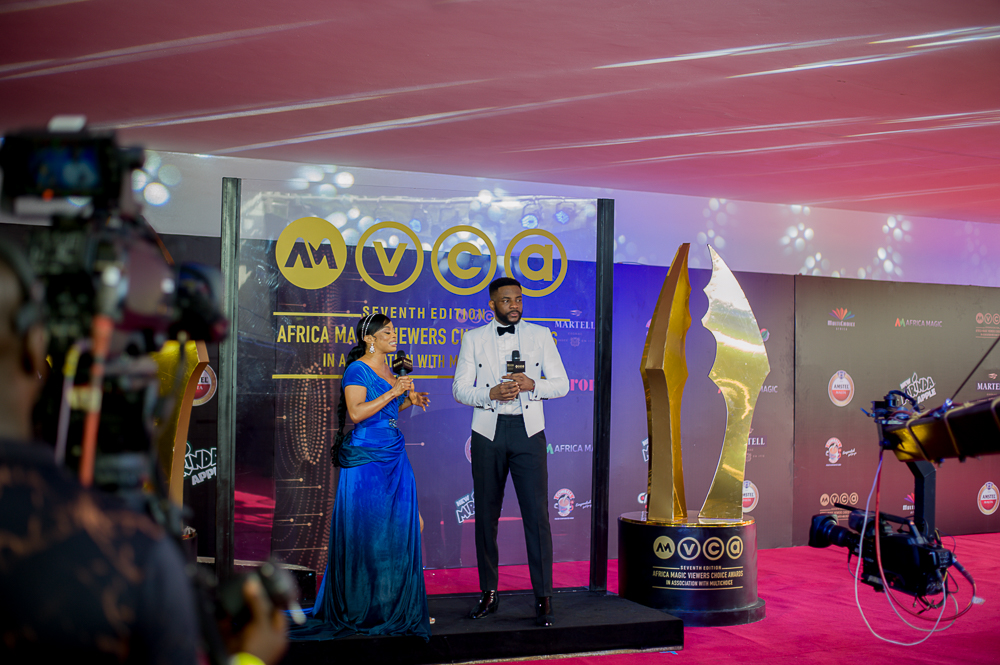
Ebuka and Toke Makinwa presenting at the 2020 AMVCA

In 2010, Makinwa made her major media debut on Rhythm 93.7 FM's The Morning Drive show as a co-host. In 2012, she made a television appearance as host of the Most Beautiful Girl in Nigeria (MBGN) beauty pageant, which was broadcast live across Nigeria. She co-hosted Flytime TV's 3 Live Chicks, along with Tosyn Bucknor and Oreka Godis. The show debuted as a web series before expanding to terrestrial television in late 2012. Makinwa did not renew her contract with Flytime TV for the show's second season and was subsequently replaced by her radio colleague Omalicha. In 2012, Makinwa launched her YouTube vlog series Toke Moments. In 2013, she won the Nigeria Broadcasters Award for Outstanding Female Presenter of the Year, and was nominated for Radio OAP of the Year at the Nigeria Entertainment Awards. That same year, she became an ambassador for the United Africa Company of Nigeria.

In January 2014, Hip Hop World Magazine announced Makinwa as the host of its talk show Trending. She also secured a spot on EbonyLife TV as a co-host of its flagship show Moments. Makinwa has hosted numerous notable events, including the 2013 The Future Awards Africa and the 2014 Headies Awards. In March 2021, Makinwa co-hosted the third season of The Voice Nigeria with actress Nancy Isime. In October 2021, she hosted Season 12 of Gulder Ultimate Search. In November 2021, she premiered her talk show, Talk With Toke Makinwa, on MultiChoice. In 2022, Makinwa played the character Louise in the 2022 film Glamour Girls, which was directed by Bunmi Adesoye and Abimbola Craig.

=== On Becoming and handbag line ===
In November 2016, Makinwa released her memoir On Becoming, which addresses her personal struggles and the betrayal of her ex-husband Maje Ayida. Makinwa went on a book tour to promote the book; the tour included stops in Nigeria, the U.K, South Africa, the U.S., and parts of East Africa.

In 2017, Makinwa launched a handbag line under her eponymous label, Toke Makinwa Luxury. She also launched a skincare product called Glow by TM in 2018.

== Endorsements ==
In 2013, Makinwa became an ambassador for the United Africa Company of Nigeria, along with Osas Ighodaro, Dare Art Alade and Dan Foster. She signed a multi-million naira contract with Nestlé Nigeria and became the face of its brand Maggi. In 2016, she was awarded the brand ambassadorial role at Mecran Cosmetics, and became an ambassador for Payporte and Ciroc. In November 2019, Makinwa signed an endorsement deal with Oppo Mobile. In 2021, she hosted season 6 of The Buzz, a show that airs on Showmax Naija.

== Personal life ==
Makinwa lost both of her parents in a gas explosion when she was 8 years old. On 15 January 2014, she married Maje Ayida, whom she had been involved with for eight years prior to their wedding. In 2015, she separated from Ayida after finding out that he had gotten his ex-girlfriend pregnant. On 5 October 2017, Makinwa's marriage to Ayida was dissolved by a Lagos High Court on the grounds that Ayida committed adultery. Makinwa disclosed that she lost her older sister when Big Brother Naija season 6 ended.

Makinwa gave birth to her first child, a girl, in August 2025. Earlier in the same month, she unveiled her baby bump in a social media post.

== Filmography ==
- Glamour Girls (2022)
- Blood Sisters (2022)
- Omo Ghetto: The Saga (2020)
- Love Is War (2019)
- Sugar Rush (2019)
- Makate Must Sell (2019)
- Therapy (comedy web series)

== Awards and nominations ==
Year	Award	Category	Result	Notes	Ref
2012	The Future Awards	On Air Personality of the Year (Radio)	Nominated	lost to Tolu Oniru of The Beat 99.9 FM	
2013	Nigeria Broadcasters Awards	Outstanding Female Presenter of the Year	Won	—N/a	
2013	2013 Nigeria Entertainment Awards	Radio OAP of the Year	Nominated	Lost to Freeze of Cool FM	
2014	Nickelodeon Kids' Choice Awards	Favourite Nigerian on Air Personality	Nominated	Lost to Freeze of Cool FM	
2014	2014 Nigeria Entertainment Awards	Entertainment Personality of the Year	Nominated	Lost to Denrele	
2014	2014 Nigeria Entertainment Awards	Best OAP of the Year	Nominated	Lost to Yaw of Wazobia FM	
2014	ELOY Awards	TV Presenter of the Year & Brand Ambassador (Maggi)	Nominated	—N/a	
2017	Glitz Awards	Style Influencer of the Year	Won	—N/a	
2017	Avance Media	Most Influential Young Nigerian in Media	Won	—N/a	
2018	Africa Youth Award	100 Most Influential Young Africans	Won	—N/a	
2020	ELOY Awards	Innovative Beauty practitioner of the Year	Won	—N/a	
2020	Net Honours	Most Popular Media Personality (Female).	Won	—N/a	
2020	Net Honours	Most Searched Media Personality	Won		
2021	Net Honours	Most Popular Media Personality (Female).	Won		
2021	Net Honours	Most Searched Media Personality	Nominated		
2021	African Entertainment Awards USA	Media Personality of the Year	Nominated	Lost to Ebuka Obi-Uchendu	
