= The Perfect Arrangement =

- Directed by: Chinaza Onuzo
- Written by: Pemi Elujoba and Chinaza Onuzo
- Produced by: Inkblot Productions and FilmOne Entertainment
- Starring: Sharon Ooja; Bovi; Mr Macaroni; Pere Egbi; Funsho Adeolu
- Release date: 13 May 2022
- Country: Nigeria
- Language: English

The Perfect Arrangement is a 2022 Nigerian film co-produced by Inkblot Productions and FilmOne Entertainment and directed by Chinaza Onuzo. The film stars Sharon Ooja, Pere Egbi, Bovi, Adunni Ade, Funsho Adeolu, Mr Macaroni, Dorcas Shola Fapson, Rotimi Salami, Mimi Chaka, Wofai Fada, Ummi Baba Ahmed and many others. The film hit cinemas nationwide on 13 May 2022, following the premiere that held in Lagos on 8 May 2022.

== Synopsis ==
The Perfect Arrangement tells the story of Tade Kalejaiye a young entrepreneur and daughter of a politician who decides to remove her family from bankruptcy by attempting to marry Chidi Obikwe who is also facing a political barricade after his sex tape was leaked online and that deterred his political ambition. Tade and Chidi who were in a relationship five years ago had to come back together in a staged relationship so as to salvage their respective problems. A love triangle situation ensued when Tade began to fall in love with Chidi and Cheta, Chidi's brother and Tade's best friend.

== Selected cast ==
- Sharon Ooja as Tade Kalejaiye
- Bovi as Chidi Obikwe
- Pere Egbi as Cheta Obikwe
- Mr Macaroni as Oba Kalejaiye
- Dorcas Shola-Fapson as Sope-Bakare Kalejaiye
- Funsho Adeolu as Otunba Adeolu Kalejaiye
- Adunni Ade as Victoria Otukpo
- Mimi Chaka as Abigail
- Temidayo Adenibuyan as Kels

== Premiere ==
The Perfect Arrangement premiered on Sunday, 8 May 2022 in Ikoyi, Lagos. The premiere was themed 'fun and flirty' and featured many Nollywood actors and actresses including those who did not star in the film. Some of the celebrities in attendance were Banky W and Adesua Etomi, Ramsey Nouah, Judith Audu, Bimbo Ademoye, Nancy Isime, Mary Lazarus, Tope Olowoniyan, Uzor Arukwe, Osas Ighodaro, Stan Nze, Akay Mason, Ebenezer Eno, Charles Novia, Ibrahim Suleman and many more. Speaking during the premiere, the director revealed that the film was shot in Lagos and Abeokuta, across 34 different locations.
