= We Were Girls Once =

2024 novel by Aiwanose Odafen

- Author: Aiwanose Odafen
- Genre: Contemporary fiction
- Publisher: Simon and Schuster
- Publication date: April 25, 2024
- Pages: 320
- ISBN: 978-1-398-50618-3

We Were Girls Once is the third novel by Nigerian author Aiwanose Odafen. Published in 2024 by Simon & Schuster, it is a contemporary fiction novel that explores the lasting impact of childhood trauma, the complexities of female friendship, and the difficult journey toward healing and justice.

== Plot summary ==
The story follows Ebunoluwa, a successful Nigerian fashion designer living a seemingly perfect life in Lagos with her loving husband, Dapo. Her carefully constructed world is shattered when she learns that her childhood best friend, Sope, has died by suicide in London. Sope leaves behind a cryptic note addressed to Ebunoluwa, saying, "There are things I never told you," and a package containing her diaries.

Haunted by guilt and unanswered questions, Ebunoluwa travels to London for the funeral. There, she immerses herself in Sope's diaries, which transport her back to their shared childhood. The diaries chronicle their idyllic friendship but also gradually reveal a dark, hidden secret: both girls were sexually abused by Sope’s influential and wealthy father, Mr. Adeoye.

As Ebunoluwa uncovers the full extent of the abuse and the profound trauma Sope carried throughout her life, she is forced to confront her own repressed memories and the silence that allowed the abuse to continue. The revelation strains her relationship with her husband and her family, who struggle to understand her sudden change and the painful history she is unearthing.

Driven by a need for justice for Sope and herself, Ebunoluwa must decide whether to expose a powerful and respected man, risking her reputation, marriage, and family standing in a society that often stigmatizes survivors and protects the powerful. The narrative alternates between the present day in Lagos and London and flashbacks to the girls' childhood in Nigeria, detailing the loss of their innocence and the lifelong consequences of the trauma they endured.
