= Superstar (2021 film) =

- Teaser Poster
- Directed by: Akhigbe Ilozobhie
- Written by: Uyoyou Adia; Chinaza Onuzo
- Starring: Nancy Isime; Timini Egbuson; Eku Edewor; Daniel Etim Effiong
- Production companies: Inkblot Productions; FilmOne Productions
- Release date: 29 December 2021
- Country: Nigeria
- Language: English

Superstar is a 2021 Nigerian romantic drama film released on 29 December 2021 by Inkblot Productions. The film features an ensemble cast including Nancy Isime, Deyemi Okanlawon, Timini Egbuson, Daniel Etim Effiong, and Eku Edewor. Superstar was jointly produced by Inkblot Productions and FilmOne Studios, marking the ninth collaboration between the two studios.

== Plot ==
An up-and-coming actress named Queen experiences a rise to stardom and success as she faces the different challenges of life on her way to stardom. She is faced with different challenges and also faced with an occurrence from her past, her unyielding ex-boyfriend, her new life, and stardom itself. Life just became a crossroad for Queen. The intriguing drama exemplifies the growth and adventure of an upcoming actress in Nollywood and the various challenges on the road to stardom as experienced by Queen.

== Cast ==
- Nancy Isime as Queen
- Timini Egbuson as Delarin
- Eku Edewor as Teni
- Ufuoma McDermott as Muna
- Deyemi Okanlawon as Babs
- Daniel Etim Effiong as Hassani
- Teniola Aladese as Cynthia
- Damola Ademola as Director Gbenga
- Chris Ejike as Teni's husband
- Genoveva Umeh as Ore
- Ezinne Akam as inmate 1
- Chiamaka Andaline as inmate 3
- Ndubuisi Chidozie as policewoman
- Oluwagbenga Ethan as doctor
- Gold Gerry as press woman
- Rachael Isaac as nurse 1
- Arowosola Kofoworala as nurse 2
- Matilda Ogunleye as premiere announcer
- Chinaza Onuzo as Chimieze
- Lord Frank as Frank

== Production ==
Superstar was jointly written by Akhigbe Ilozobhie, Uyoyou Adia and Chinaza Onuzo, and it was directed by Akhigbe Ilozobhie. The film was released in December 2021, in turn, to also mark the 10th anniversary of Inkblot Production.

== Awards and nominations ==
In the 8th edition of Africa Magic Viewers' Choice Awards (AMVCA), Nancy Isime, who played Queen in the film, was nominated under the category "Best Actress in a Drama" for her role, but she lost to Osas Ighodaro.
