= The Set Up 2 =

2022 Nollywood sequel crime thriller film by Naz Onuzo

- Directed by: Naz Onuzo
- Written by: Naz Onuzo
- Produced by: Inkblot Productions, Film One Entertainment, and Anakle Studios
- Starring: Nancy Isime; Adesua Etomi; Kehinde Bankole
- Production company: Inkblot Productions
- Distributed by: FilmOne Distributions; Anakle Films
- Release date: 12 August 2022
- Country: Nigeria
- Language: English

The Set Up 2 is a 2022 Nigerian crime thriller film, and a sequel to The Set Up, which was released in 2019. The sequel was jointly produced by Inkblot Productions, Film One Entertainment and Anakle Studios. The film was directed by Naz Onuzo, replacing Niyi Akinmolayan, who directed the first part. The film stars Adesua Etomi, Kehinde Bankole, Nancy Isime, Jim Iyke, Tina Mba, Uzor Arukwe, Kate Henshaw, Blossom Chukwujekwu, Stan Nze, Lota Chukwu and others. The film was released in Nigeria on 12 August 2022.

== Synopsis ==
The Set Up 2 is a direct sequel to the 2019 film The Set Up. The film follows Chike four years after the events of the first film, as she struggles to come to terms with the fact that she is now an agent for an international organisation. Chike is forced to leave everything behind and go after a criminal named Usi as things begin to get complicated.

== Selected cast ==
- Adesua Etomi as Chike
- Kehinde Bankole as Grace
- Nancy Isime as Usi
- Jim Iyke as Edem
- Kate Henshaw as Teju
- Tina Mba as Madam
- Uzor Arukwe as Dimeji
- Blossom Chukwujekwu as Igwe Mackintosh
- Stan Nze as Obiora
- Lota Chukwu as Omada
- Tope Olowoniyan
- Grace Abah as prison guard
- Seun Akindele as Mayowa Kuku
- Chris Attoh as Eugene
- Onyeama Anthony as Patron
- Nsikan Allen as Omani
- Tomisin Ayoade as young Grace
- Amaju Cedric as rich guy
- Bolaji Egbebi as Nanny
- Gbubemi Ejeye as Nkoyo
- Kratos Enahoro as Obadiah

== Premiere ==
The Set Up 2 premiered on Sunday 7 August 2022 in Lagos at the IMAX Filmhouse cinema in the Lekki area of Lagos. In attendance were actors and actresses featured in the movie, as well as several Nollywood stars who were not part of the cast, including, Tobi Bakre, Lala Akindoju, Jemima Osunde, Adunni Ade, Femi Adebayo, Mr Macaroni and others.
