= Funsho Adeolu =

Nigerian actor (born 1968)

- Born: 9 May 1968 (age 58); Ondo State, Nigeria
- Citizenship: Nigerian
- Occupations: Actor; producer; director
- Spouse: Victoria Adeolu
- Children: 2

Funsho Adeolu (born 9 May 1968) is a Nigerian actor, film director and film producer.

== Early life ==
Adeolu was born on 9 May 1968 in Ondo State, southwestern Nigeria. He went to Baptist Academy. Adeolu featured in Heroes and Zeroes, a 2012 Nigerian drama film. He is frequently incorrectly credited with appearing in Countdown at Kusini, a film that featured his namesake, the late Oba Funsho Adeolu.

== Personal life ==
Adeolu is married to Mrs. Victoria Adeolu and has two sons.

== Partial filmography ==
- Heroes and Zeroes (2012)
- The Antique (2014) as Enoma
- The Tribunal (2017)
- The Perfect Arrangement (2022) as Otunba Adeolu Kalejaiye
- One Too Many (2022) as DSP Lekan
- Slum King (2023)

== Awards and nominations ==
Year	Award ceremony	Category	Film	Result	Ref
2020	Best of Nollywood Awards	Best Actor in a Lead role –Yoruba	Digiola	Nominated	

== See also ==
- List of Nigerian film producers
- List of Yoruba people
