= Nnegest Likké =

American film director (born 1970)

- Born: Nnegest Olufunmilayo Likké; February 19, 1970 (age 56); Oakland, California, United States
- Education: Clark Atlanta University (BA)
- Occupations: Filmmaker; screenwriter; producer
- Notable work: Phat Girlz

Nnegest Olufunmilayo Likké (born February 19, 1970) is an American film director, screenwriter and producer.

Many of her works explore themes of cross-cultural relationships between black Americans and Africans, and she is a pioneer of the blended-culture genre.

Nnegest is one of the first women of color to write and direct a movie distributed by a major Hollywood studio. Her directing credits include Fox Searchlight's cult-classic romantic-comedy Phat Girlz, indie love dramas Ben & Ara and Everything But A Man, and two documentary features.

== Early life and education ==
Nnegest Likké was born in Oakland, California, and raised in Oakland and San Francisco. She is the daughter of an African-American civil rights activist and an Ethiopian freedom fighter. During her childhood, Likké had the opportunity of traveling around the world, including throughout Europe and Africa with her mother.

Likké attended Skyline High School in Oakland. After graduating, she attended Clark Atlanta University, where she studied film and graduated with a BA in mass communications.

== Career ==
Likké moved to Los Angeles to pursue screenwriting. While honing her craft, Likké taught drama, history and English at a high school in Los Angeles.

Phat Girlz (2006) was Likké's first feature film, starring Mo’Nique and released by 20th Century Studios. This film, considered a cult-classic is a romantic-comedy about two attractive, full-figured women who meet the men of their dreams while on vacation. Her second film was Ben & Ara, followed by indie Everything But a Man starring Monica Calhoun and Jimmy Jean-Louis (2019). Likké wrote, directed and produced Everything But a Man, about the challenges successful, career-driven women have finding love. Her most recent film, which she was screenwriter on is the #1 Netflix Original Nigerian film A Sunday Affair.

== Filmography ==
Year	Title	Credited as		
		Director	Writer	Producer
2006	Phat Girlz	Yes	Yes	No
2015	Ben & Ara	Yes	No	No
2019	Everything But a Man	Yes	Yes	Yes
2023	A Sunday Affair	No	Yes	No

== Awards, nominations and honours ==
Her film awards include Best Diaspora Film at the 2016 Africa Movie Academy Awards for Ben and Ara, which she directed. Her 2019 international romantic drama, Everything But A Man won the Audience Choice Award at the Pan African Film Festival and the movie debuted at #1 on Netflix in Africa and on AMC's ALLBLK channel in the USA. In 2023, the Netflix Original film, A Sunday Affair, which she was the lead writer on debuted at #1 on Netflix Africa and was the most viewed Nigerian film on the platform in the first half of 2023.

- In 2015, Likké received an honorary mention for Best Feature Film at the All Lights India International Film Festival.
- In 2016, Likké received the Best Female Protagonist award for her film Ben & Ara at the Nevada Women's Film Festival.
- In 2016, Ben and Ara won the award for Best Diaspora film by the Africa Movie Academy Awards.
