= The Antique (2014 film) =

2014 Nigerian drama film

- Film poster
- Directed by: Darasen Richards; DJ Tee
- Written by: Darasen Richards
- Produced by: Darasen Richards
- Starring: Olu Jacobs; Bimbo Akintola; Gabriel Afolayan; Ricardo Agbor; Seun Akindele; Funsho Adeolu
- Cinematography: DJ Tee
- Edited by: Dipo Teniola; DJ Tee; Darasen Richards
- Music by: Cobhams Asuquo
- Production company: Darasen Richards Films
- Distributed by: Silverbird Film Distribution
- Release dates: 19 October 2014 (Lagos premiere); 13 February 2015 (Nigeria)
- Running time: 105 minutes
- Country: Nigeria
- Language: English

The Antique is a 2014 Nigerian drama film directed by Darasen Richards and DJ Tee. It stars Olu Jacobs, Bimbo Akintola, Gabriel Afolayan, Ricardo Agbor, Seun Akindele and Funsho Adeolu.

== Plot ==
The film opens with a scene of a happy and successful community as they share their lot with one another, but there is a sudden turn of event as three strange beings invade the kingdom in search of an antique; which has the power to protect its people and sustain its royalty. The kingdom's warriors are overpowered and the invaders take away the sacred emblem, thereby bringing a curse on the land.

Decades later, the current Oba's only son is ill and at the point of death. As revealed by the witch doctor, the sickness is as a result of the missing antique. Therefore, to bring the circles of deaths and famine in the land to end, an innocent girl named Uki (Oge Indiana) is chosen to risk her life by journeying to the land where mortals are forbidden, on a quest to find and return the antique.

Three special warriors, who will stop at nothing until they achieve their purpose, accompany Uki. The journey proves to be a mission almost impossible as they encounter sinister immortal forces, which try to stop them from reaching their goal. The witch doctor with a seductress named Isoken has a hidden agenda as anxiety back in the village unveils series of dynamics in the running of the kingdom. Meanwhile, the return of Uki and the warriors is uncertain.

== Cast ==
- Olu Jacobs as Oba Ekpen
- Bimbo Akintola as Queen 1
- Gabriel Afolayan as Uyi
- Ricardo Agbor as Oba Akugba
- Seun Akindele as Lead Invader
- Funso Adeolu as Enoma
- Oge Indiana as Ukinebo
- Kiki Omeili as Isoken
- Akpororo as Oriri
- Omowunmi Dada as Osas
- Theresa Edem as Princess
- Samuel Ajibola as Prince
- Sadiq Adebayo
- Seun Olaiya
- Omoye Uzamere
- Temitope Solaja
