= Uduak Isong =

Nigerian scriptwriter and producer

- Born: Uduak Isong Oguamanam
- Citizenship: Nigerian
- Education: University of Ibadan; University of Leicester
- Occupations: Scriptwriter, Producer and Entrepreneur
- Known for: The Comedy films Okon Lagos
- Notable work: I’ll Take My Chances
- Spouse: Chidi Oguamanam

Uduak Isong Oguamanam is a Nigerian Nollywood scriptwriter, producer and entrepreneur based in Lagos, Nigeria. She is best known for the comedy films Okon Lagos (2011) and its sequel Okon Goes To School (2013), Lost In London (2017), and Desperate Housegirls (2015). Falling (film) (2015) is Isong Oguamanam's first film under her own production company, Closer Pictures, based in Lagos, Nigeria.

== Early life and education ==
Oguamanam is from Akwa Ibom State, South-South Nigeria. She is married to Chidi Oguamanam, a medical doctor. Her sister is Nollywood director and producer Emem Isong Misodi. Isong Oguamanam studied Communication Arts and Russian languages from the University of Ibadan, Ibadan, Nigeria.

She has a master's degree in New Media and Society from the University of Leicester. She also has a Diploma in French from Alliance Francaiein, Lagos, Nigeria.

== Career ==
Oguamanam's first job was in the aviation industry as a cabin crew member for two years. She also worked in the capital market and telecoms industry. Oguamanam began writing prose and poetry. She ventured into film "when it looked like it was the more lucrative thing to do". Her early films were produced through Royal Arts Academy, Lagos, owned by her sister, Emem Isong Misodi.

Oguamanam set up Closer Pictures, Lagos. Falling is the first film produced under Closer Pictures. Falling tells the story of love and betrayal. The budget for Falling was 10 million Nigerian Naira.

In 2010, Oguamanam directed her first film To Live Again. It was adapted from her short story which was published by Farafina magazine based in Lagos.

== Training ==
Oguamanam has attended training and film-related events. She attended the Berlinale Talent Campus, in Berlin, Germany as a result of her screenplay Unfinished Business.

In 2012, Isong Oguamanam was chosen by the British Council, Nigeria to the UK-Nigeria creative world partnership programme, in London, England.

She also attended workshops at Raindance in the UK.

== Awards ==
In 2006, Oguamanam was awarded the Commonwealth Short Story Prize.

== Advocacy and social work ==
Oguamanam tackles societal issues though her work. Her first project, To Live Again, deals with the stigmatization faced by people living with HIV. In 2012, she produced and co-wrote Kokomma which tackled female sexual abuse. Her film, Fine Girl (2016), is the story of a young girl who turns to prostitution to save her dying father.

Oguamanam also speaks on issues affecting Nollywood. In February 2018, she advised fellow film producers to "let other people sing their praise" in response to producers releasing unverified box office figures.

== Okon ==
Oguamanam created the Okon character with the first in the series, Okon Lagos (2011). Actor Imeh Bishop Umoh acted as Okon. There are other films in the series such as Okon Goes To School (2013). Lost In London (2017) is the latest in the series, that continues Okon's adventures in Lagos.

== Filmography ==
Okon Lagos (2011), Okon Goes to School (2013), Kokomma (2012), Lost In London (2017), Kiss and Tell (2011), Desperate House Girls (2015), Fine Girl (2016), It’s About Your husband (2016), American Boy (2017), Falling (film) (2015), A Piece Of Flesh (2007), Holding Hope (2010), Stellar (2015), Unfinished Business (2007), Edikan (2009), Through The Fire & Entanglement (2009), Timeless Passion (2011), Bursting Out (2010) Troubled Waters (2017), I’ll Take My Chances (2011), Weekend Getaway (2012), Beyond Disability (2015), Champagne (2015), Dining With A Long Spoon (2014), On Bended Knees (2013), Stolen Tomorrow (2013), Mrs Somebody (2012), Forgetting June (2012), All That Glitters (2013), Misplaced (2013), Lonely Hearts (2013), Getting Over Him (2018), Apaye (2014), The Department (2015),

Year	Title	Role
2007	Unfinished Business	Screen Writer
2007	A Piece Of Flesh	Screen Writer
2009	Edikan	Screen Writer
2009	Entanglement	Screen Writer
2009	Through The Fire	Screen Writer
2010	Holding Hope	Screen Writer
2010	Bursting Out	Screen Writer
2011	Okon Lagos	Producer
2011	Kiss and Tell	Screen Writer
2011	I'll Take My Chances Spellbound	Screen Writer
2011	Timeless Passion	Screen Writer
2012	Mrs Somebody	Screen Writer
2012	Forgetting June	Screen Writer
2012	Kokomma	Producer
2012	Troubled Waters	Producer
2012	Weekend Getaway	Screen Writer
2013	Okon Goes To School	Producer
2013	On Bended Knees	Screen Writer
2013	Stolen Tomorrow	Screen Writer
2013	All That Glitters After the Proposal	Screen Writer
2013	Misplaced	Screen Writer
2013	Lonely Hearts	Screen Writer
2014	Apaye	Screen Writer
2014	Dining With A Long Spoon	Screen Writer
2015	Desperate House Girls	Screen Writer/Producer
2015	Champagne	Screen Writer
2015	The Department	Producer
2015	Beyond Disability	Screen Writer
2015	Falling (film)	Screen Writer/Producer
2015	Stellar	Screen Writer/Producer
2016	Fine Girl	Screen Writer/Producer
2016	It's About Your Husband	Screen Writer/Producer
2017	American Boy	Producer
2017	Lost In London	Producer
2017	Troubled Waters	Producer
2017	Cash Daddy	Writer/Producer
2018	Getting Over Him	Producer
