= A Sunday Affair =

2023 Nigerian film directed by Walter Taylaur

- Directed by: Walter Taylaur
- Written by: Nnegest Likké; Darrel Bristow-Bovey
- Produced by: MO Abudu; Inem King; Sonia Nwosu; Joshua Olaolu; Heidi Uys
- Starring: Dakore Egbuson-Akande; Nse Ikpe-Etim; Oris Erhuero; Hilda Dokubo; Uzor Osimkpa; Chris Iheuwa
- Cinematography: Malcolm Mclean
- Edited by: Alex May
- Music by: Kulanen Ikyo
- Production company: EbonyLife Films
- Distributed by: EbonyLife
- Release date: 14 February 2023
- Running time: 96 minutes
- Country: Nigeria
- Language: English

A Sunday Affair is a 2023 Nigerian Romantic film written by Nnegest Likké and Darrel Bristow Bovey, Directed by Walter Taylaur, and co-produced by Mo Abudu. The film features Hilda Dokubo, Alex Ekubo, Oris Erhuero, Nse Ikpe-Etim, Dakore Egbuson-Akande, and many others.

== Plot ==
A Sunday Affair tells the story of a love triangle between two best friends, Uche (played by Nse Ikpe-Etim), Toyin (played by Dakore Egbuson-Akande), and Sunday (Played by Oris Erhuero). Both friends meet Sunday at different events and fall in love with him, each wanting to introduce the other to Sunday who is caught in the love web, and unable to choose between the friends. As fate may have it, Toyin was eliminated from the love triangle after battling with a fatal illness.

== Cast ==
- Nse Ikpe-Etim as Uche
- Dakore Egbuson-Akande as Toyin
- Oris Erhuero as Sunday
- Alexx Ekubo as Femi
- Hilda Dokubo as Mrs. Okwara
- Moses Akerele as Enigma
- Pamilerin Adegoke as young Toyin
- Eku Edewor as Mrs. Oyeyemi
- Juliet Jackson as Toyin's assistant
- Chris Iheuwa as Sam
- Uzor Osimkpa as Kelechi
- Ukeme Ekpe as Gynecologist
- Philippe Leporcher as Vance Packard
- Tonia Okojie as Art Buyer
- Jasmine Olarotimi as Young Uche
- Princess Chiamaka Ugbaja as Young Kelechi
- Abolad Anthony as Doctor

== Reception ==
The film was perceived as the romantic drama that it is and was streamed amongst other Nollywood films for 2023 Valentine's Day, which coincided with its release date on 14 February.

== See also ==
- List of Nigerian films of 2023
