= The Millions (film) =

2019 Nigerian film

- Movie poster
- Directed by: Toka McBaror
- Written by: Tunde Apalowo
- Produced by: Chika Lann
- Starring: Ramsey Nouah; Blossom Chukwujekwu; Toyin Abraham
- Edited by: Tunde Apalowo
- Music by: Ava Momoh
- Production company: Chika Lann Productions
- Distributed by: FilmOne Distribution
- Release date: 30 August 2019
- Running time: 94 minutes
- Country: Nigeria
- Language: English
- Budget: ₦62 million
- Box office: ₦19.3 million

The Millions is a 2019 Nigerian comedy thriller film directed by Toka McBaror and written by Tunde Apalowo. The film stars Ramsey Nouah, Blossom Chukwujekwu, Toyin Abraham in the lead roles. It was one of the most expensive films to be made in the Nigerian film industry with an estimated budget of ₦62 million. The film had its theatrical release in Nigeria on 30 August 2019 and received positive reviews from the critics. The film became a box office success grossing ₦12.5 million worldwide and was the second highest grossing Nigerian film in September 2019 after Kasanova.

== Synopsis ==
The story revolves around the lives of five guys who come together to carry out a massive money heist in Nigeria. Bem Kator a charismatic con man plays the lead character to successfully launch the heist as planned. But things don't go in the way he would have expected with an interesting climax forming up the crux.

== Cast ==
- Ramsey Nouah as Bem Kator
- Toyin Abraham as Adenike
- Blossom Chukwujekwu as Jerome
- Folusho Kayode as Big Lo
- Etinosa Idemudia as escort girl
- Nancy Isime as Ivey
- Chika Lann as Amaka
- Ayo Makun as Wole Baba
- Ali Nuhu as Sheikh
- Broda Shaggi as party organiser
- Energy Uloko as Sheikh's goon
- Vera Chidera as party girl
- Ego Nnalue as escort girl
- Collins McBaror as Digger 1
- Chidozie Nwosu as Sheikh's goon

== Production ==
Principal photography for the film commenced on 9 January 2019 and lasted for 17 days, with shooting taking place at various locations in Nigeria, including Kaduna, Abuja, and Lagos.

The film was produced by former international model Chika Lann, who coincidentally made her debut in the Nollywood industry as a filmmaker through this project. She also played a supporting role in the film, which marked her acting debut.
