= A Lagos Love Story =

Nigerian Film

- Directed by: Chinaza Onuzo
- Written by: Chinaza Onuzo; Ozzy Etomi
- Starring: Jemima Osunde; Mike Afolarin, Uti Nwanchukwu; Susan Pwajok; Uche Montana; Veeiye
- Distributed by: Netflix
- Release date: 11 April 2025
- Country: Nigeria

A Lagos Love Story is a 2025 Nigerian romantic comedy film directed by Naz Onuzo and written by Ozzy Etomi and Naz Onuzo. The film was produced by Naz Onuzo under the banner of Inkblot Productions and features Mike Afolarin, Jemima Osunde, Susan Pwajok, Uti Nwanchukwu, Uche Montana and Veeiye. The film was released on Netflix on 11 April 2025, and Amazon Prime in May 2025.

== Plot ==
Promise Quest is an aspiring event planner determined to save her family's home from foreclosure. She applies for a contract to manage the Lagos Art and Culture Festival, hoping the earnings will help her pay off a ₦20 million debt. However, things take an unexpected turn when she is assigned to work as the personal assistant to rising Afrobeats star, King Kator, for the four-day event.

As Promise navigates the chaotic world of celebrity management, her spirited younger sister Favour begins to chase her own dream of becoming a fashion designer. Caught between unfamiliar responsibilities, mounting family pressure, and growing feelings for Kator, Promise's relationship with both her boss and Kator's manager becomes strained.

Meanwhile, Favour is introduced to a glamorous circle of wealthy young lagosians who offer her the opportunity of a lifetime—at the cost of leaving her old life behind. When Promise is offered ₦20 million to manipulate Kator, and Favour is asked to sell the rights to her fashion brand, both sisters must confront what truly matters to them and where their loyalties lie.

== Cast ==
- Jemima Osunde as Promise Quest
- Mike Afolarin as King Kator
- Susan Pwajok as Favour Quest
- Chimezie Imo as Kufre
- Uche Montana as Adanna
- Linda Ejiofor-Suleiman as Fadekemi Rhodes
- Kalu Ikeagwu as Mr. Quest
- Uti Nwachukwu as Mayowa
- IK Osakioduwa as Achike
- Shoddy as Shege Baba

== Production ==
A Lagos Love Story has its origin at the Africa International Film Festival in 2022 when the director Naz Onuzo met an executive from Netflix, and Onuzo mentioned his interest in making a big-budget romantic comedy. Onuzo wrote the story with Ozzy Etomi to pitch the film to Netflix execs, who greenlit the project. Onuzo and Etomi took a year to finish the script, and filming started in Lagos in July 2024. The shoot was completed in 24 days. The film was produced by Inkblot Productions, and it was released on Netflix on 11 April 2025. The film is Onuzo's fifth feature film and third rom-com.

== Music ==
The film's soundtrack features original tracks performed by Mike Afolarin and produced by Nosakhare "Impvlse" Abbe.

== Reception ==
The film debuted at number one on Netflix Nigeria's chart shortly after its release and became a trending topic on social media, with #ALagosLoveStory generating hundreds of posts on X. Many viewers praised the cinematography, costume design, and festival and concert scenes.
