= New Money (2018 film) =

2018 Nigerian comedy-drama film directed by Tope Oshin

- Directed by: Tope Oshin
- Written by: Chinaza 'Naz' Onuzo
- Story by: Naz Onuzo
- Produced by: Kene Okwuosa; Zulumoke Onuekwusi; Chinaza 'Naz' Onuzo; Isioma Osaje
- Starring: Jemima Osunde; Blossom Chukwujekwu; Dakore Akande; Wale Ojo; Kate Henshaw; Osas Ighodaro; Folarin Falana; Daniel Etim Effiong; Falz; Wofai Fada; Adeolu Adefarasin; Kalu Ikeagwu; Femi Branch; Bikiya Graham-Douglas; Rita Edwards; Yolanda Okereke
- Cinematography: Idowu Adedapo; Pindem Lot
- Edited by: Victoria Akujobi
- Music by: Bayo Adepetun
- Production company: Inkblot Productions
- Distributed by: FilmOne Distributions
- Release date: March 23, 2018
- Running time: 107 minutes
- Country: Nigeria
- Language: English
- Budget: $50,000
- Box office: $250,000

New Money is a 2018 Nigerian film written by Chinaza Onuzo, directed by Tope Oshin and produced by Inkblot Productions and FilmOne. It tells the story of a salesgirl who dreams of becoming a fashion designer and subsequently receives an unexpected inheritance from her absentee father. Released in March 2018, it stars Jemima Osunde, Kate Henshaw, Blossom Chukwujekwu, Dakore Akande, Wale Ojo Osas Ighodaro and Falz d Bahd Guy.

== Plot ==
Twenty-three year old Toun finds herself thrown into the world of the rich after her father left his multibillion-dollar company to her in his will. She learns that her mother, Fatima, was legally married to her father, Ifeanyi, although, due to strong opposition from his family, the marriage was annulled. He remarried, this time to Ebube, but they never had any children together. She ignored her mother and entered into a life of luxury, which is threatened by her uncle, Chuka, and his son, Patrick. Her decisions put the company in a negative light and portray her as an inferior CEO. Thrown in the mix of all of this, Toun struggles to find her old self again while pushing away old friends and falsely accusing new ones. Through all this, Joseph stands by her.

== Cast ==
- Jemima Osunde as Toun
- Blossom Chukwujekwu as Joseph
- Kate Henshaw as Fatima
- Dakore Akande as Ebube
- Wale Ojo as Chuka
- Wofai Fada as Binta
- Adeolu Adefarasin as Patrick
- Osas Ighodaro as Angela
- Daniel Etim Effiong as Ganiyu Osamede
- Falz as Quam
- Kalu Ikeagwu as Ifeanyi
- Femi Branch
- Bikiya Graham-Douglas
- Rita Edwards as manager
- Yolanda Okereke

== Theatrical release ==
The film premiered at IMAX Cinema in Lekki, Lagos State on 23 March 2018, organised by Inkblot Productions and FilmOne Distributions.

== Reception ==
New Money received mixed reviews from critics. Nollywood Reinvented referred to the movie as being "Disney-like", highlighting the lack of depth in the story as well as the over-saturation of popular music. NR, however, praised the performances in the movie. Ife Olujuyigbe of True Nollywood Stories (TNS) praised the movie for the casting, music selection and rich dialogue but criticized it for what she called 'a rather flat ending and a poster that begs for originality'. Overall, she rates the movie 80%. Ayomide Crit praised the storytelling, production, and casting but was of the opinion that the storyline lacked sufficient depth. The critic also held the opinion that the directorial composition was averagely done and finally described the movie as 'just there, nothing spectacular and nothing remarkable'. Chidumga Izuzu of Pulse Nigeria praised Jemima Osunde's performance as Toun and praised the chemistry between characters, but stated that the movie is not as intense as director Oshin's previous works.

== Sequel ==
In 2020, a sequel titled Quam's Money was filmed. The film follows the story of Quam, a security guard who suddenly becomes a multimillionaire. The sequel stars Falz, Toni Tones, Jemima Osunde, Blossom Chukwujekwu and Nse Ikpe-Etim.

== See also ==
- List of Nigerian films of 2018
- IMDb
