= Coventry College =

Coordinates: 52.4144°N 1.5042°W

Location
- Swanswell Street; Coventry, West Midlands, CV1 5DG; England

Information
- Type: Further education college
- Motto: Helping the people of Coventry and its region get the knowledge and skills to succeed
- Established: 2017 (Note: City College Coventry was formed in 2002)
- Department for Education URN: 130473 Tables
- Ofsted: Reports
- Gender: mixed
- Age: 16+
- Enrolment: 8,000
- Website: http://www.coventrycollege.ac.uk

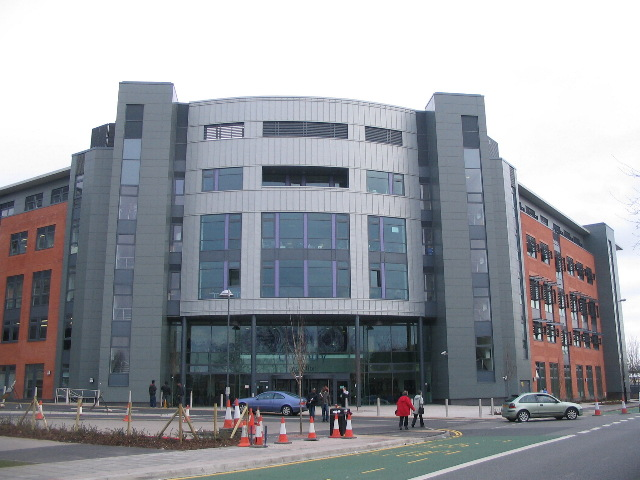
Coventry College moved to this purpose-built complex in 2009

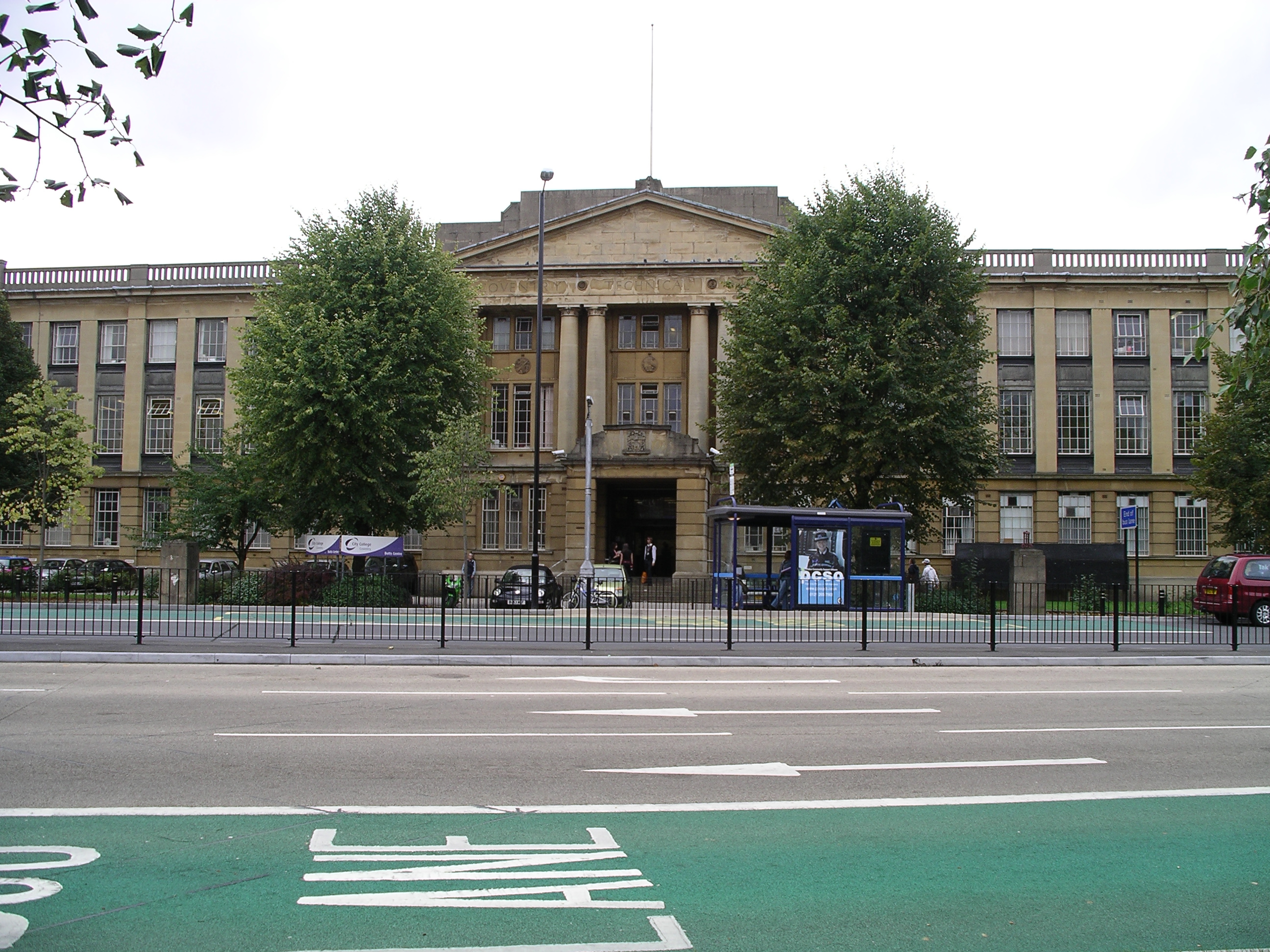
The former Butts site of City College Coventry and the former home of the Coventry Technical College

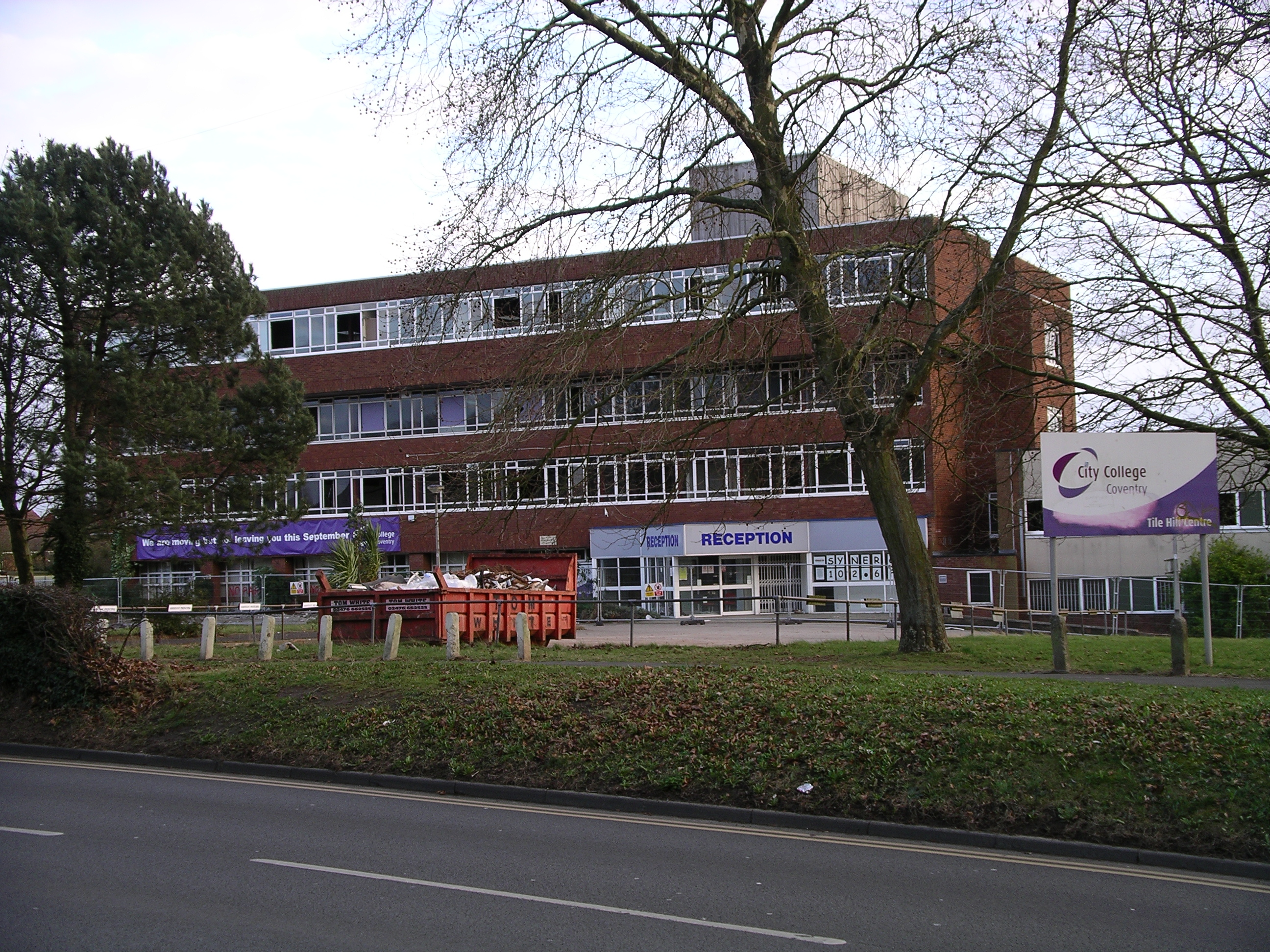
Demolished in 2008, the Tile Hill site was home to the former Tile Hill College until 2002

Coventry College is a further education college based in the city of Coventry, England. It was formed in 2017 through the merger of two previous colleges in the city, City College Coventry, which was established in 2002, and Henley College. Since 2021, the college has mainly operated from a purpose-built campus (known as the city campus or the main campus) in the Swanswell area of Coventry, following the closure of the Henley College building, however also uses The Alan Higgs Centre for its sport-based courses. As of 2020, the college accommodates around 8,000 students each year.

== History ==
The origins of Coventry College can be traced back to the 19th Century, with the Mechanics’ Institution. Formed in 1829 to educate young weavers, it provided lessons in writing, arithmetic, geometry, geography, grammar, and music. In 1835, an Anglican minority withdrew from the institution to form the Religious & Useful Knowledge Society; the two were reunited in 1855, becoming the Coventry Institute. In 1888, the Coventry Institute merged with another body, the Technical Institute, and became the Technical College under the Education Act 1902. The home of the Technical College at The Butts was built in 1935 and opened by the Duke of York, who would later become King George VI. However, the need for a higher technical training in Coventry resulted in the Lanchester College of Technology being built in 1961, which would ultimately become Coventry University.

The Technical College was later renamed the Coventry Technical College, and merged with Tile Hill College on 12 February 2002 to create City College Coventry. It was officially launched by former Coventry teacher and then Education Secretary Estelle Morris. The merger resulted in two constituent sites, and the former colleges were renamed to The Butts Centre (Coventry Technical College) and Tile Hill Centre (Tile Hill College). The latter was later demolished in 2008.

In 2007, the college began the move to a new purpose-built complex in the Swanswell area of the city, with the transferral of courses from and the closure of the Tile Hill Centre. In January 2009, staff and students from The Butts Centre moved in, and the £53m complex was officially opened later that year.

In 2011, a merger was proposed between the college and the nearby Warwickshire College.

=== 2013 Ofsted inspection ===
An Ofsted inspection in March 2013 deemed the college 'inadequate', criticising the quality of teaching, leadership and management, as well as low course completion rates and poor attendance. The three inspection categories, 'Outcomes for learners', 'Quality of teaching, learning and assessment' and 'Effectiveness of leadership and management' were all awarded the lowest rating Oftsed awards, prompting the resignation of the principal, Paul Taylor, in May 2013. Re-inspection in June 2014 saw the college receive an Ofsted grade 3 rating.

=== 2017 merger with Henley College ===
In 2017, the City College merged with Henley College to form Coventry College. The Henley College campus closed in 2021, when the building was considered to be in a general state of disrepair and could not be improved due to insufficient funding. The site was subsequently used for emergency services training and served as a filming location for the BBC drama series Phoenix Rise.

In September 2024, Coventry College opened a new multi-purpose teaching and learning space known as the Cofa Courtyard, named after Cofa’s Tree, which is believed to be the original tree marking the boundary and settlement of the City of Coventry. The college secured £1.5m of Post-16 Capacity Funding from the Department for Education to develop its courtyard into a covered quad area enabling it to expand its teaching and learning spaces significantly.

The Henley College campus was demolished in August 2025 following a fire at the site on 29 April 2025 that caused extensive damage (approximately 70% of the site was destroyed) including the significant portions of the roof, which led to a collapse.

== Campus ==
The complex is sited on land previously occupied by modern flats designed for residents with disabilities.

== Structure and organisation ==
=== Governance ===
City College Coventry is run by the Corporation, the governing body of the college. There are five committees that comprise the Corporation, with one each specialising in governance, finance and resources, quality and performance, estates, and audits respectively.

Steve Logan was appointed in July 2013, following the resignation of the previous principal Paul Taylor. In December 2015, Steve Logan resigned preceding the release of the college's Ofsted report (in which the college was graded inadequate).

Dr Elaine McMahon was principal from January 2016 until the creation of the new merged college.

=== Schools ===
City College Coventry comprises six schools:

- School of Business, Science, Access & HE
- School of Construction
- School of Creative & Digital Industries
- School of Engineering
- School of English, Maths and Foundation Studies
- School of Health

=== Partnerships ===
The college has partnerships with the University of Warwick and Coventry City F.C.

== Teaching profile ==
The college offers a range of qualifications including GCSEs, BTECs, and HNDs. The teaching of A levels ceased in September 2013.

In 2010 the Quality Assurance Agency for Higher Education stated that "confidence in the College's management of its responsibilities, as set out in its partnership agreements" for the standard of both the awards the college gives and the learning opportunities the college provides.

In 2011, a poll of 2,000 students in the annual Learner Feedback – First Impressions survey found that 98 per cent were satisfied with their course.

The college's student radio station was SynergyFM, which later closed down.
