= Adesua Etomi =

Nigerian actress (born 1986)

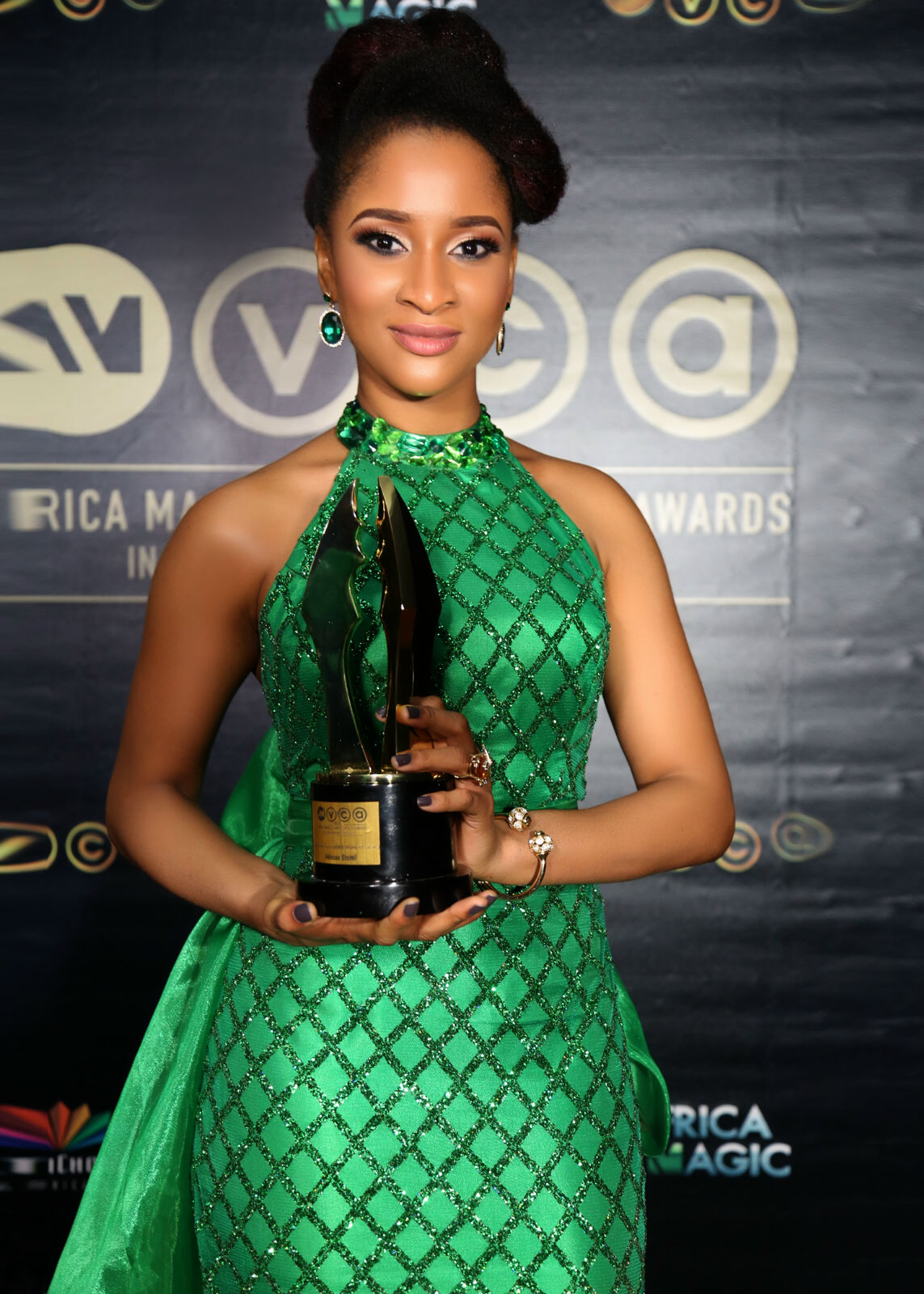
- Adesua Etomi at the AMVCAs 2016
- Born: Tolulope Adesua Etomi; 22 February 1986 (age 40); Owerri, Imo State, Nigeria
- Education: City College Coventry; University of Wolverhampton
- Occupations: Actress; entrepreneur
- Years active: 2012–present
- Spouse: Banky Wellington (m. 2017)
- Children: 2
- Awards: Africa Magic Viewers Choice Awards (2016)

Tolulope Adesua Etomi-Wellington (born 22 February 1986), (Note: Many sources cite Etomi's year of birth as 1986. However, she claimed to be 29 years old in an interview with Pulse Nigeria in January 2016.) commonly known as Adesua Etomi, is a Nigerian actress and entrepreneur. She debuted her film career with Knocking On Heaven's Door (2014). Etomi has starred in several films and received several awards, including Best Actress in a Drama at the 2016 Africa Magic Viewers Choice Awards for Falling.

== Early life and education ==
Etomi was born in Owerri, Imo State, Nigeria, as the last of three siblings. Her father is a soldier of Esan descent who was born in Edo State, while her mother is an engineer of Yoruba descent. Etomi attended Corona School in Victoria Island, Lagos, and moved to Queen's College. At the age of 13, she left Nigeria for the United Kingdom, and attained a diploma in physical and theatre art from the City College Coventry in 2004. She also studied arts and performance at the University of Wolverhampton in 2006.

== Career ==
Etomi's film credits include The Arbitration, The Wedding Party, and Falling. Her performance in Falling earned her the 2016 Africa Magic Viewers' Choice Award for Best Actress in a Drama. Other notable films she has appeared in include A Soldier's Story (2015), Out of Luck (2015), and Couple of Days (2016). Etomi played Shiela in the fourth and fifth seasons of Shuga, a television soap opera about HIV/AIDS prevention. She began starring as Amaka Obiora, an undercover police officer in the Yemisi Wada-directed crime series LasGidi Cops, which debuted in June 2016. She was also featured on Vogue's list of 14 global superstars. In February 2022, Etomi released her debut single "So Natural". In October 2023, she launched her beauty brand Sanaa Beauty, which she co-founded with Jemima Osunde.

== Personal life ==
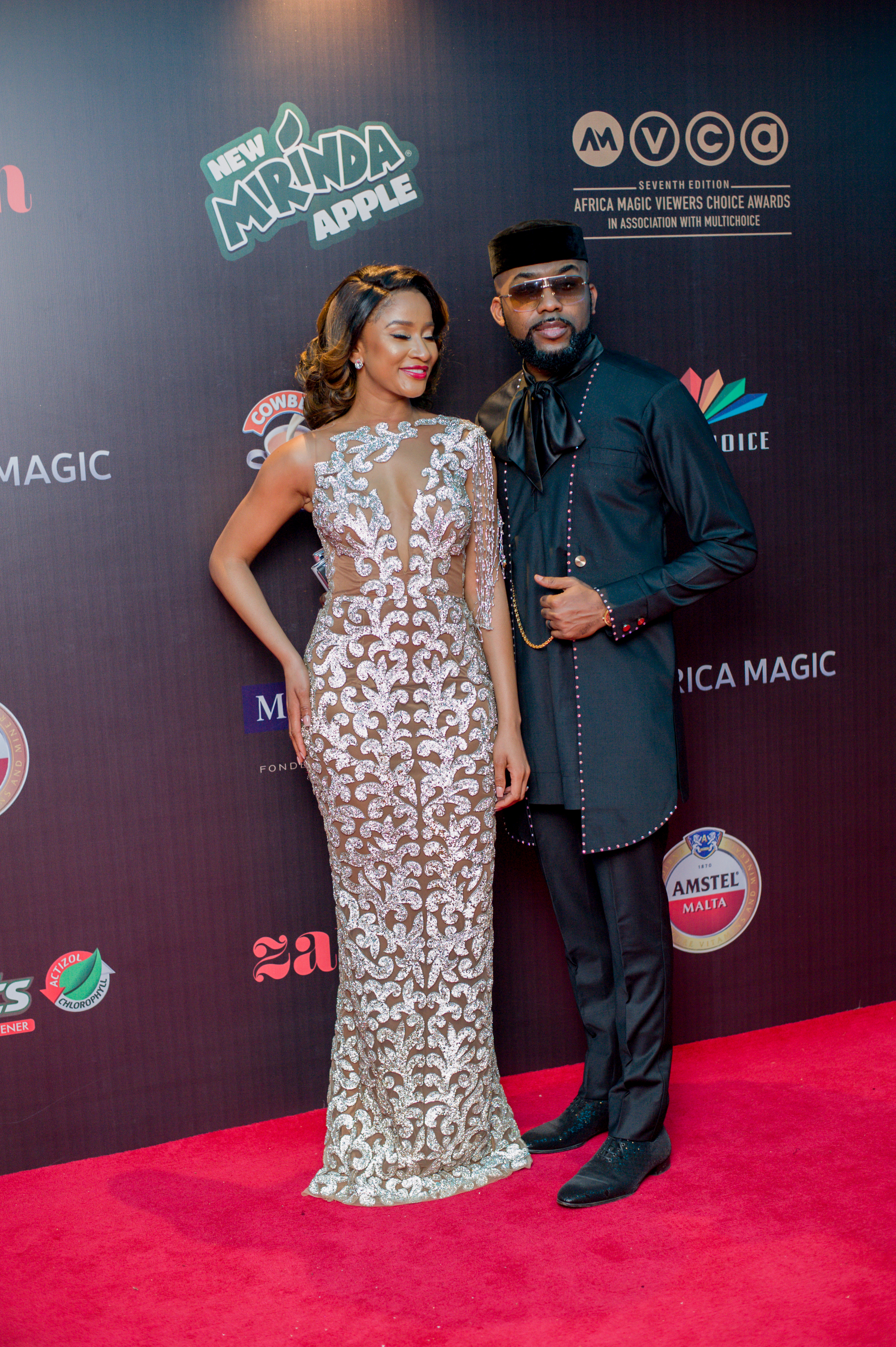
Adesua Etomi and husband Banky W. at AMVCA 2020

Etomi got engaged to Banky W in February 2017. The couple held their traditional marriage on 19 November, a court wedding on 20 November, and a white wedding ceremony on 25 November 2017, in Cape Town, South Africa. In early January 2021, Etomi gave birth to their first child. In April 2021, Etomi and Banky W opened up about their marriage and struggles with child bearing while speaking at Waterbrook Church. In 2024, the couple announced the birth of their second child on Instagram.

Etomi was credited with saving Iretiola Doyle's daughter from bullies. In March 2025, Etomi shed light on Hyperemesis gravidarum by sharing her personal battle with the condition. Her candidness and advocacy raised awareness about the challenges faced by women with severe pregnancy-related illnesses.

== Filmography ==
=== Film ===
Year	Title	Role	Notes
2013	The Call	Tara	Short film
2014	Brave	Layo	Short film
2014	Knocking On Heaven's Door	Debbie	
2015	Falling	Muna	
2015	A Soldier's Story	Lebari	Directed by Frankie Ogar
2015	Out of Luck	Bisola	
2016	Couple of Days	Nina	
2016	The Arbitration	Dara Olujobi	Drama
2016	Something Wicked	Claudia	
2016	The Wedding Party	Dunni Coker	
2016	Ayamma: Music In The Desert	Ayamma/Iko/Ihuoma	Musical
2017	10 Days In Sun City	Bianca	Adventure / Comedy / Romance
2017	In Line	Kate	
2017	The Wedding Party 2	Dunni Onwuka	Directed by Niyi Akinmolayan
2018	Date Night		
2018	King of Boys	Adekemi Salami	Crime / Drama
2018	Memoirs of 4	Teni	Directed by Alex Mouth
2018	Up North	Zainab	Drama
2019	Muna	Muna	Action / Crime / Drama
2019	Malika: Warrior Queen	Malika	Short Animation
2019	Sugar Rush	Susie	Action / Comedy
2019	The Set Up	Chike	
2022	The Set Up 2	Chike	Crime / Drama
2022	The Perfect Arrangement		
2023	Gangs of Lagos	Gift	Crime / Thriller
2024	Japa	Kamsi	Comedy / Fantasy

=== Television ===
Year	Title	Role	Notes
2012	Smooth Promotions	Reporter/Presenter	TV Station
2014	Gidi Up (season 2)	Sharon	Series
2015	Las Gidi Cops	Amaka Obiora	Series
2015	Shuga (season 5)	Sheila	Series
2017	Shuga: Down South	Sheila	Series
2025	Iyanu: Child of Wonder	Olori	Animated series

=== Theatre ===
Year	Title	Role	Company
2004	The Crucible	John Proctor	City College Production
2005	Miss Saigon	John Thomas	City College Production
2006	Jesus Christ Superstar	Judas	City College Production
2008	Fractal	The Oppressed	Arena Theatre
2009	The Grimm Tales	Dwarf/Witch	Arena Theatre
2009	Not My Cup Of Tea	Immigrant	Arena Theatre
2012	The Miller's Tale	Alice	Saga Tiata - Edinburge Fringe Festival
2013	Anatomy Of A Woman	Bolatito	Lagos Theater Festival
2013	Shattered	Loveth	Paw Studios
2013	Crystal Slippers	Sewa	Thespian Family Theater
2013	London Life Lagos Living	Sue	Paw Studios
2013	Saro	Rume	Bap Productions
2013	Secret Life Of Baba Segi's Wives	Segi	Joos and Joms Productions
2014	Band Aid		
2014	Make We Waka	Chantelle	Look Left Look Right
2014	Saro	Rume	Bap Productions

=== Voice over ===
Year	Role	Company
2013	Taste Bud	Fanta
2014	Fan	Solo Phones

== Awards and nominations ==
Year	Award	Category	Recipient	Result	Ref
2009	Foresight Theater Awards	Best Performance in a devised Piece of work	Herself	Won	
2014	Golden Icons Academy Movie Awards	Most Promising Actress	Knocking on Heaven's Door	Nominated	
2014	Nollywood Reinvented Awards	Best New Actress	Herself	Won	
2015	Golden Movie Awards	Golden Actress in a Lead Role	Falling	Nominated	
2015	Golden Movie Awards	Discovery of the Year	Herself	Won	
2015	City People Entertainment Awards	Best New Actress	Herself	Nominated	
2015	Golden Icons Academy Movie Awards	Best Actress	Falling	Nominated	
2015	Golden Icons Academy Movie Awards	Best On-screen duo		Nominated	
2015	Golden Icons Academy Movie Awards	Female Viewer's Choice	Herself	Nominated	
2015	ELOY Awards	Actress of the Year - Big screen	Falling	Won	
2015	ELOY Awards	Actress of the Year - Television	Gidi Up	Nominated	
2016	Africa Magic Viewers Choice Awards	Best Actress in a Drama (Movie/TV series)	Falling	Won	
2016	12th Africa Movie Academy Awards	Best Actress in Leading role	Falling	Nominated	
2016	Golden Movie Awards	Golden Actress	Falling	Nominated	
2016	Nigeria Entertainment Awards	Best Actress in Leading Role	Falling	Nominated	
2016	ELOY Awards	Actress of the year - Big Screen	The Arbitration	Nominated	
2017	Africa Magic Viewers Choice Awards	Best Actress Drama/TV Series	The Arbitration	Nominated	
2017	Nigeria Entertainment Awards	Best Lead Actress In A Film	Ayamma	Nominated	
2020	Best of Nollywood Awards	Best Actress in a Lead role –English	Sugar Rush	Nominated	

== See also ==
- List of Nigerian actresses
