= Constance Ejuma =

Cameroonian actress, screenwriter. and producer

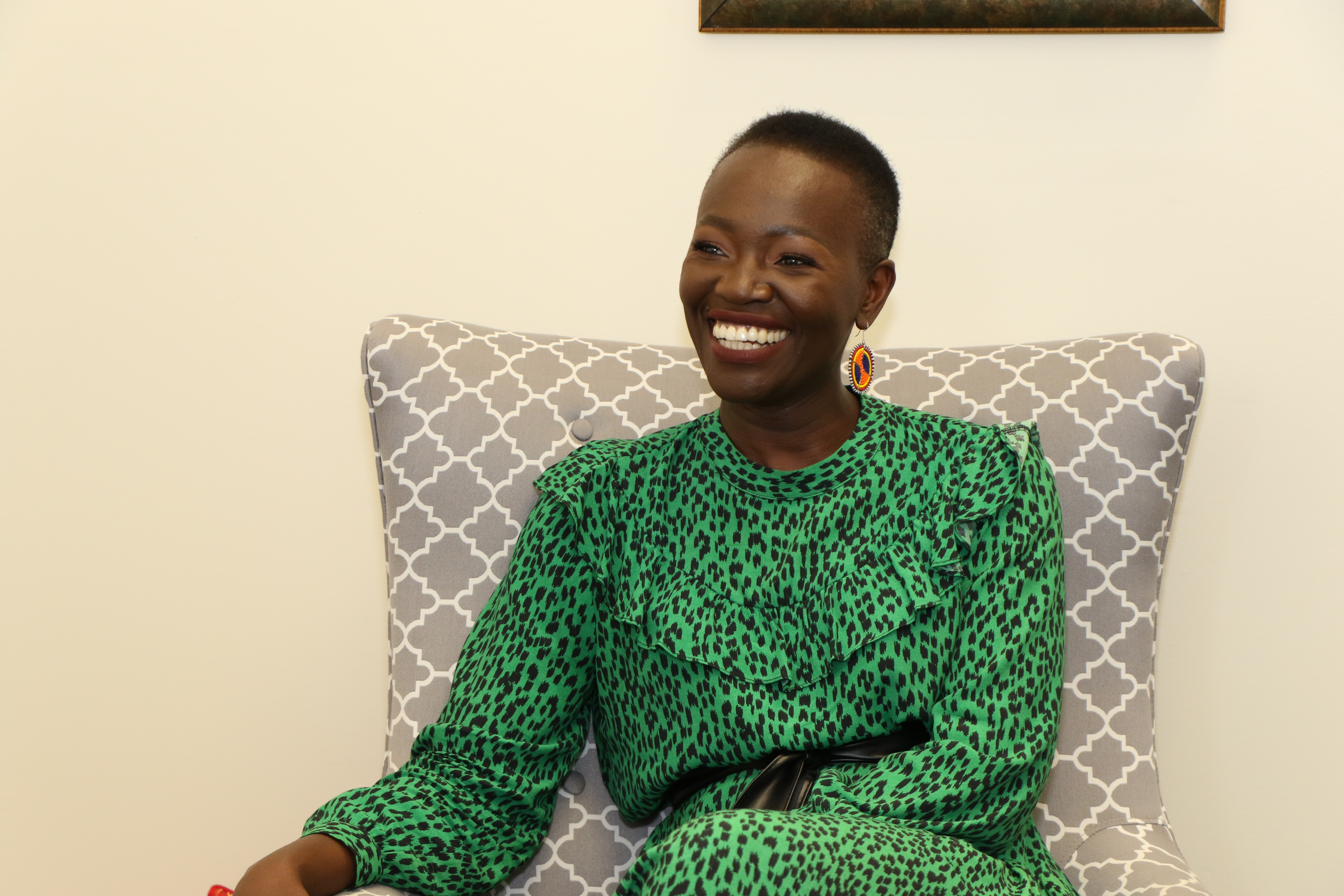
- Image of Constance Ejuma of Black Panther
- Citizenship: Cameroon
- Education: University of Toronto, University of Leicester
- Occupations: Actress, screenwriter. and producer
- Notable work: Scorpion and Black Panther

Constance Ejuma, born in Cameroon, is a Cameroonian actress, screenwriter, and producer.

== Biography ==
=== Studies ===
She studied at the University of Toronto in Canada. Then, she continued her studies at the University of Leicester in England in 2022 where she obtained her master's degree in mass communication, and then an honorary doctorate degree from the same university.

=== Career ===
After studying theater at university, she decided to go to Los Angeles to start her career in cinema. She appeared in the series Scorpion and Black Panther.

== Filmography ==
- 2009 - Monk, season 8, episode 2
- 2011 - Southland, season 3 .
- 2016 - Criminal Minds: Beyond Borders
- 2017 - Future Man, season 1.
- 2017 - Scorpion, season 4
- 2020 - SEAL Team, season 4.
- 2021 - The Good Doctor
- 2021 - Val
- 2023 - Lessons in Chemistry (2 episodes)

== Awards ==
- Best Actress at the SAG Awards and African Movie Academy .
