= The Set Up (2019 film) =

2019 crime thriller film by Niyi Akinmolayan

- Film poster
- Directed by: Niyi Akinmolayan
- Written by: Chinaza Onuzo
- Produced by: Isioma Osaje
- Starring: Dakore Akande; Adesua Etomi; Kehinde Bankole
- Cinematography: Muhammad Atta Ahmed
- Music by: Gray Jones Ossai
- Production company: Inkblot Productions
- Distributed by: FilmOne Distributions; Anakle Films
- Release date: 9 August 2019
- Running time: 103 minutes
- Country: Nigeria
- Language: English
- Box office: ₦53.3million

The Set Up is a 2019 Nigerian crime thriller film directed by Niyi Akinmolayan. The film stars Dakore Akande, Adesua Etomi and Kehinde Bankole in the lead roles. The plot follows a young woman who abandons her childhood innocence and turns to crime for survival. The film was released on 9 August 2019 and received mixed review,s with critics highlighting its excessive plot twists and turns in the screenplay. Despite the mixed reception, the film became a success at the box office. It was also streamed via Netflix on 22 April 2020.

== Plot ==
Two friends, Grace and Chike, eventually became drug dealers in order to survive. Chike, being a drug smuggler, receives more money and drugs than what she bargained for and is dragged into a series of deceiving traps when she is hired by socialites Edem and Madame to marry a wealthy heiress.

== Cast ==
- Dakore Akande as heiress
- Adesua Etomi as Chike
- Kehinde Bankole as Grace
- Jim Iyke as Edem
- Tina Mba as Madame (Enitan)
- Joke Silva as Mrs. Elesho
- Ayoola Ayolola as Bamidele
- Uzor Arukwe as Pastor Dimeji
- Sunny Ajaero as Fitness Instructor
- Kamini Chaurasia as Elisa
- Kayode Freeman as Elesho's Lawyer
- Marie Humbert as Kelly Spencer
- Ani Iyoho as Grace's Father
- Eze Kelechi as Area Boy
- Wendy Lawal as Young Chike

== Production ==
The film marked the seventh feature film directorial venture for Niyi Akinmolayan after Kajola, Make a Move, Falling, The Arbitration, The Wedding Party 2 and Chief Daddy. The film also marked second collaboration between director Niyi and writer Chiza Onuzo after The Wedding Party 2 and the film was produced under the banner Inkblot Productions, marking its 10th film. The portions of the film were predominantly shot in Lagos. The official trailer of the film was unveiled on 3 July 2019. The film premiered at the FilmHouse Cinemas in Lagos on 4 August 2019.
