= Aiwanose Odafen =

Nigerian feminist writer

- Born: Lagos, Nigeria
- Education: Covenant University, University of Oxford
- Occupation: Writer
- Writing career
- Period: 2022-present
- Genre: Fiction
- Notable works: Tomorrow I Become a Woman; We Were Girls Once
- Website: www.aiwanose.com

Aiwanose Odafen is a Nigerian feminist writer. She is best known for her novels, Tomorrow I Become a Woman (2022) and We Were Girls Once (2024).

Born in Lagos, Nigeria, Odafen attended the Nigerian Turkish International Colleges, where she graduated in 2009. In 2013, she graduated from Covenant University with a degree in accounting.

== Career ==
Odafen is an accountant and a member of the Association of Chartered Certified Accountants in the United Kingdom. In 2015, she earned an MBA from the University of Oxford. She received her MFA in creative writing from the Iowa Writers Workshop in 2024. She has also attended Chimamanda Ngozi Adichie's Purple Hibiscus Trust Writing Workshop. Her short story Faces was long listed for the 2020 Commonwealth Short Story Prize.

In 2020, her debut novel Tomorrow I Become a Woman was acquired by Scribner UK, a subsidiary of Simon & Schuster UK. The novel was published in 2022. It was listed as in Brittle Paper|s 100 Notable African Books of 2022, Open Country Mag|s 60 Notable Books of 2022, and Afrocritik|s Top 25 African Novels of 2022.

In 2022, Odafen contributed to I Am Adona, a collection of stories by African women about their country's achievements in advancing women's rights and empowerment. The collection includes writings from a variety of women who are pioneers in their field, including 2020 recipient of the BBC World News Komla Dumor Award, Victoria Rubadiri; Botswana's first TED fellow and LGBT activist, Katlego K Kolanyane-Kesupile; and others.

Her second novel, We Were Girls Once, was published on 25 April 2024. It has been described by Isele Magazine as "sharp, unadorned, and unforgiving" with Ukamaka Olisakwe stating that it "takes the deft mind of an attentive writer to stir this kind of somber reflection".

== Bibliography ==
- Tomorrow I Become a Woman (2022)
- We Were Girls Once (2024)
