= Falling (2015 film) =

2015 Nigerian romantic drama film

- Theatrical release poster
- Directed by: Niyi Akinmolayan
- Written by: Uduak Isong Oguamanam
- Produced by: Uduak Isong Oguamanam
- Starring: Desmond Elliot; Blossom Chukwujekwu; Adesua Etomi; Kunle Remi; Tamara Eteimo; Kofi Adjorlolo
- Production company: Closer Pictures
- Distributed by: FilmOne Distribution
- Release date: 18 September 2015
- Country: Nigeria
- Language: English
- Budget: ₦10 million

Falling is a 2015 Nigerian romantic drama film written and produced by Uduak Isong Oguamanam, and directed by Niyi Akinmolayan. It stars Desmond Elliot, Blossom Chukwujekwu, Adesua Etomi, Kunle Remi, Tamara Eteimo, and Kofi Adjorlolo.

The film tells the story of a young couple, Muna and Imoh, whose lives are upended by a tragic accident that leaves Imoh in a deep coma for several months.

== Plot ==
Muna and Imoh are a young, happily married couple. Their lives take a devastating turn when Imoh is involved in a car accident on his way to work, leaving him in a coma. Despite financial struggles, Muna remains steadfast in her belief that Imoh will regain consciousness. When the hospital decides to discharge Imoh due to their inability to cover his medical bills, Muna turns to her father, Mr. Mba, who provides part of the funds needed to keep Imoh on life support for another month.

Muna's sister, Tina, grows increasingly concerned about Muna's emotional well-being and the toll Imoh's condition is taking on her. Tina convinces Muna to join her at an event, despite Muna's reluctance. At the club, Tina shares Muna's situation with her friend Yemi, who then attempts to woo Muna. This infuriates Muna, but Tina explains that Yemi is a medical doctor and might be able to assist with Imoh’s condition, which becomes her motivation for sharing personal information.

Although Yemi tries to befriend Muna, she initially resists his kindness. Over time, however, they grow closer, and Muna begins to rebuild her life, even securing her scriptwriting job again despite a lack of support from her producer. As their relationship deepens, Muna finds herself in a vulnerable moment and has a sexual encounter with Yemi, which leads to an unplanned pregnancy.

A few days after Muna discovers she is pregnant, Imoh miraculously regains consciousness and is discharged from the hospital, leaving Muna to grapple with the complex consequences of her actions.

Imoh begins exhibiting strange behavior, raising suspicions in Yemi. When Muna informs Imoh about her pregnancy, he demands that she terminate it, causing tension and struggles in their relationship. Meanwhile, after learning about the child, Yemi insists that Muna keep the baby, believing it to be a sign that they are destined to be together.

During this time, Mr. Mba is hospitalized after a health scare while being intimate with his much younger wife, Lota Chukwu. While recovering, he has a heartfelt conversation with Muna, Tina, and their mother about the mistakes he has made in his past.

Amidst this emotional turmoil, Imoh unexpectedly walks in and reconciles with Muna. Together, they decide to keep the baby, choosing to face their future as a united couple.

== Cast ==
- Adesua Etomi as Muna
- Kunle Remi as Imoh
- Blossom Chukwujekwu as Yemi
- Tamara Eteimo as Tina
- Desmond Elliot as himself
- Kofi Adjorlolo as Mr Mba
- Deyemi Okanlawon as Producer

== Production and release ==
Falling was shot on location in Lagos for a period of two weeks. This film is Uduak Isong Oguamanam's first solo effort as a film producer. Teaser posters for the film was released online in May 2015. A trailer for the film was released on 5 May 2015. Another poster was released online in July 2015. Uduak announced that the film would premiere on 18 September 2015 and be generally released on the same day.

== Awards and nominations ==
Year	Award	Category	Recipient	Result	Ref
2016	2016 Africa Magic Viewers' Choice Awards	Best Actor in a Drama	Blossom Chukwujekwu	Nominated	
2016	2016 Africa Magic Viewers' Choice Awards	Best Actress in a Drama	Adesua Etomi	Won	
