= Ayamma =

2016 Nigerian film

Ayamma: Music in the Forest
- Theatrical release poster
- Directed by: Chris Eneaji
- Written by: Chiji Vivians
- Produced by: Emem Isong
- Starring: Adesua Etomi; Majid Michel; Wale Ojo; Theresa Edem; Ime Bishop Umoh; Moses Armstrong
- Music by: George Nathaniel; Eveazi
- Production company: Royal Arts Academy
- Distributed by: Silverbird Distributions
- Release date: 26 December 2016
- Running time: 120 minutes
- Country: Nigeria
- Language: English

Ayamma: Music in the Forest is a 2016 magical fusion cultural film, written by Vivian Chiji, directed by Chris Eneaji, and produced by Emem Isong. The film explores Africa culture richly, exploring the culture of the Ibibio people of Nigeria. It is clouded with music, dance and comedy. Its stars stellar performances from Adesua Etomi, Wale Ojo, Majid Michel, Ime Bishop Umoh, Theresa Edem, Moses Armstrong and others. A loan was administered from The Bank of the Industry to fund the film.

== Plot ==
Prince Daraima, the charming heir to Obong Ikpaisong, repeatedly dreams of Ihuoma, the poor but beautiful maiden whose beauty is matched only by her voice. In Daraima's dreams, flowers blossom and birds gather when Ihuoma sings. He is in love with the girl of his dreams. In the real world, Prince Daraima, readied to marry Princess Ama, the daughter to a neighboring monarch. During a dance presentation to welcome Princess Ama to the kingdom, Prince Daraima is shocked to see that one of the dancing maidens is Ihuoma-a girl who, hitherto exists only in her dreams. Unbeknownst to him, this is Iko, a poor maiden in the village who is an exact replica of Ihuoma and strangely possessing the same singing genius. Princess Ama observes her groom-to-be captivated by Iko and resolves to nip this obvious threat in the bud.

== Cast ==
- Adesua Etomi as Iko and Ihuoma
- Majid Michel as Prince Ekong
- Ime Bishop Umoh as Aniefiok
- Wale Ojo as Prince Daraima
- Theresa Edem as Princess Ama
- Smart Edikan as Executioner
- Moses Armstrong as Chief Priest
- Mercy Eyo as Itoro's Mum
- Deborah Francis as Itoro
- Inemesit Jin as Kufre
- Madara Utibe as Little Iko
- Christopher Bassey as Man
- Mic-Jones Eru as Adiba
- Mikelyn Etim as Chief Maiden
- Oto Francis as Iko's Father
- Edidiong Samuel as Town Crier
- Usen Umoh as Old Man
- Ekere Nkanga as Obong Ikpaosong

== Themes ==
The film harbors qualitative musics, sung through the beautiful voice of the lead character Iko. It also brings to notice the cultural dance of the people it explores. Speaking on the movie, the writer Vivian Chiji describes it as a magical fusion cultural film. This description comes from the fact that when Iko sings in Prince Daraima's dreams, flowers blossom, and birds gather, coupled with the fact that Iko is having the same resemblance and genius as Ihuoma in real life. The movie also talks about envy, as Princess Ama's wrath befalls upon Ihuoma on observing her relationship with the prince. An important theme in this film that must not be forgotten is the love that binds Ihuoma mysteriously to the prince.

== Production ==
Emem Isong formally announced the arrival of a new film to be titled Ayamma on an interview in Lagos. Before then, she'd got in mind to do something that was going to portray her culture, she says: "I feel there are times we need to go back to our roots, so that is what I am doing." And so, when the script came, she grasped it and determined to make a huge deal out of it.

Shooting of the film was done at locations in Uyo, Akwa Ibom State, the producer's homeland. It received funding from various sources, including a loan from the Bank of the Industry. Emem Isong says it's a high budget film, and in an interview, she disclosed her reasons of investing so much on it. A website was launched with the film's title on 11 August to promote it. Adesua Etomi who played the lead role had to learn some of the culture of the Ibibio people, majorly their dance steps and musics in other to interpret the role properly since she was one not from the Ibibio.

== Release ==
The film premiered on 13 December 2016, and began airing in cinemas subsequently. The film poster was released in May 2016, and then the character poster followed.

== Music ==
The music was scored and composed by George Nathaniel and Eveazi, who'd also collaborated with the production company in the making of their previous film Knocking on Heaven's Door which also stars Adesua Etomi in lead role.
