= Tomorrow I Become a Woman =

2022 Nigerian novel

- Author: Aiwanose Odafen
- Publisher: Scribner UK
- Publication date: 28 April 2022
- ISBN: 978-1-398-50613-8

Tomorrow I Become a Woman is the debut novel by Nigerian writer Aiwanose Odafen, published in 2022 by Scribner UK, an imprint of Simon & Schuster. Set against the backdrop of Nigeria's political turmoil from the late 1970s to the 1990s, the novel follows the life of Obianuju (Uju) as she grapples with the intense societal and cultural expectations placed upon Nigerian women, particularly those related to marriage, motherhood, and the constraints of patriarchy.

Loosely based on the true stories of women known to the author, the novel is a feminist exploration of domestic abuse, female resilience, and the enduring power of friendship. It has been classified as one of the most notable African literature of 2022.

== Plot ==
The novel begins in Lagos, Nigeria, in 1978. Protagonist Obianuju "Uju" is a young economics student at the University of Lagos. Despite her academic ambitions, Uju is heavily influenced by her mother's desire for her to achieve "womanhood" through marriage to an acceptable man.

She meets Chigozie "Gozie" at church; he is a charismatic and handsome Christian Igbo man, whom her mother approves of. Uju quickly accepts his marriage proposal, hoping to finally gain her mother's elusive approval, even though she has lingering feelings for Akin, a lecturer whose Yoruba background and family history from the Nigerian Civil War make him unacceptable to her family.

Uju's marriage to Gozie quickly devolves from a fairy tale romance into a difficult and abusive relationship. As Uju gives up her education and professional aspirations to conform to the traditional expectations of a wife, she is subjected to physical and verbal abuse from her husband. Her mother and other societal figures pressure her to endure the abuse and focus on keeping her home together.

Set across a backdrop of military rule and political instability in Nigeria (spanning the Shagari, Buhari, Babangida, Abacha, and Abubakar administrations), the narrative details Uju's struggle to find her own voice and identity within a culture that constantly demands her subservience. She finds strength and solidarity in her friendships with Adaugo and Chinelo, who also navigate challenges of societal pressures, inter-tribal marriage, and the expectation of bearing a male child. The story tracks Uju's journey of self-discovery as she eventually fights back against the abusive cycle to reclaim her autonomy.
