= Blossom Chukwujekwu =

Nigerian actor (born 1983)

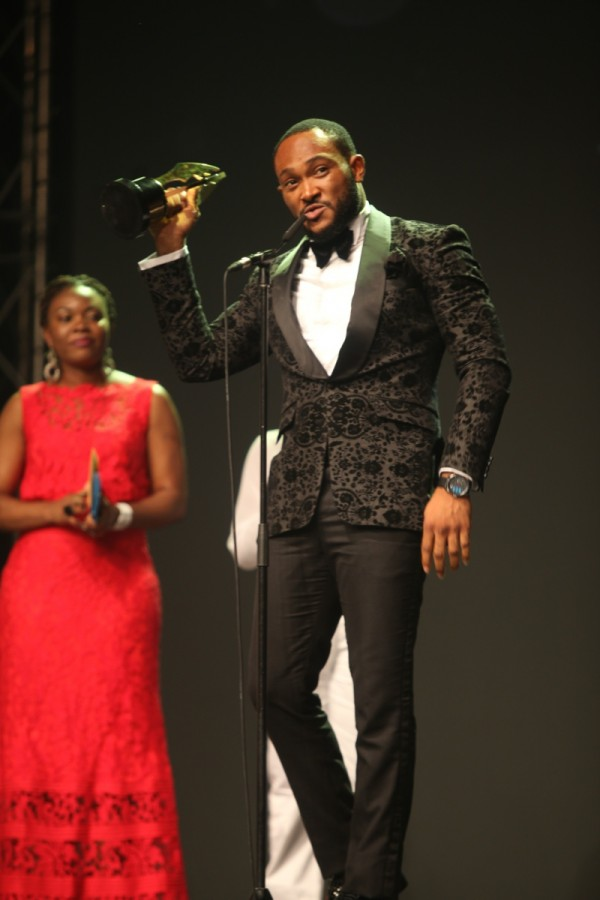
- Born: November 4, 1983 (age 42); Benin City, Edo State, Nigeria
- Citizenship: Nigerian
- Education: Benson Idahosa University
- Occupations: Actor; film producer
- Years active: 2009-present
- Known for: Flower Girl; Finding Mercy; Knocking on Heaven's Door; Falling
- Spouses: Maureen Esisi (m. 2015; sep. 2019) Winifred Akhuemokhan (m. 2022)
- Awards: See below

Blossom Chukwujekwu (born 1983) is a Nigerian actor, who made his professional acting debut in 2009. In 2015, he won the Best Supporting Actor Award at the Africa Magic Viewers Choice Awards.

== Early life and education ==
Chukwujekwu was born on 4 November 1983 in Benin City, Edo State, Nigeria to parents of Otolo, Nnewi in Anambra State origin. He studied mass communications at Enugu State University of Science and Technology (then called Anambra State University of Science and Technology) for a year before transferring to Benson Idahosa University (BIU). He graduated in July 2008 with BSc in mass communications. He also served as President of the Association of Mass Communication Students (AMCOS) from 2007 to 2008.

== Career ==
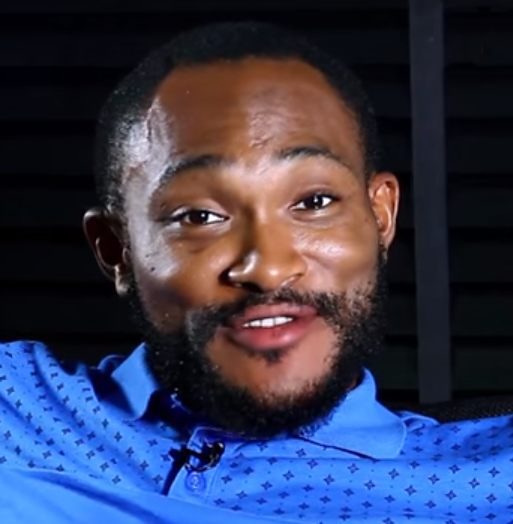
Chukwujekwu in Gbomo Gbomo Express

In 2009 Chukwujekwu was auditioned to play a role in the Nigerian soap opera Portrait Of Passion. In the same year, he starred in his feature film Vivian Ejike's Private Storm alongside Omotola Jalade Ekeinde and Ramsey Nouah. Africa Magic show Jara profiled Chukwujekwu as one of the top 5 actors to watch out for in 2013. Nollywood director Charles Novia placed him 4th in his 2013 list of best actors. In 2012 he was cast of Flower Girl directed by Michelle Bello and released in 2013.

In 2014 Chukwujekwu starred as Moses in Knocking on Heaven's Door. Because of his role in the film, he won the Africa Magic Viewers' Choice Awards for Best Supporting Actor in 2015. Since then, he has starred in The Visit (2015), A Place Called Happy (2015), and Ghana Must Go (2016). He has featured in a handful of TV dramas and series: in Tinsel as Mr. Akinlolu, in Shuga as Hart, among others. Others include: CATWALQ by Emem Isong and Monalisa Chinda, My Mum and I, About to Wed, Married, and as Kelechi Pepple in Taste of Love (2015).

== Personal life ==
Chukwujekwu had a secret wedding with Maureen Esisi on 19 December 2015 but later separated in September 2019. He married Winifred Ehimome (née Akhuemokhan), a niece of pastor Chris Oyakhilome.

== Filmography ==
=== Film ===
Year	Title	Role	Notes
2009	Private Storm	Tony Gomez	Feature Film - Theatrical Release
2010	Dating Game	Doctor Joe	Feature Film - Straight To DVD
2010	Crazy Player	Doctor Joe	Feature Film - Straight To DVD
2010	The Secretary	Doctor Joe	Feature Film - Straight To DVD
2010	One Voice Makes A Majority	Gabu	Short Film
2010	Passionate Envy	Sammy	Feature Film - Straight To DVD
2011	Fate	Ray	Feature Film - Straight To DVD
2011	Samantha	Morris	Feature Film - Unreleased
2011	Showgirl	Emeka	Feature Film - Straight To DVD
2011	King Solomon And Queen Of Sheba	Dayo	Feature Film - Straight To DVD
2011	Evil Cult	Sam	Feature Film - Unreleased
2011	Cobra	Ace	Feature Film - Unreleased
2011	Commandment 7	Inspector Eze	Feature Film - Unreleased
2012	Valour	Reginald Orji	Feature Film - Unreleased
2013	Flower Girl	Tunde Kulani	Feature Film - Theatrical Release
2013	The Mirror	Zeus	Feature Film - Unreleased
2013	The Tarzan Monologues	Jairus	Feature Film
2013	The Return	Emeka	Feature Film
2013	Finding Mercy	Jato	Feature Film - Theatrical Release
2013	The Undertaking	Lead	TV movie - Africa Magic Original Film
2013	Mirror	Lead	TV movie - Africa Magic Original Films
2013	Stolen Waters	Lead	Feature Film - Internet Release
2013	Raging Passion	Lead	Feature Film - Internet Release
2014	Forgetting June	Dr. George	Feature Film - Straight To DVD
2014	Perfect Imperfections	Chuks	TV movie - Africa Magic Original Film
2014	Incorruptible	Charles	TV movie - Africa Magic Original Film
2014	Green Eyed	Gbubemi	Feature Film - Theatrical Release
2014	Knocking On Heaven's Door	Moses	Feature Film - Theatrical Release
2015	The Visit	Lanre Shagaya	With Nse Ikpe Etim & Femi Jacobs
2015	Gbomo Gbomo Express	Rotimi	With Ramsey Nouah
2015	Mr&Mrs Onoja	Ramsey Onoja	Feature Film - Post Production
2015	Ghana Must Go	Olanrewaju "El-Shagz" Shagaya	Feature Film - Expected Release: June 10, 2015
2015	A Place Called Happy	Dimeji	Feature Film - Internet & TV Release
2015	Falling	Dr Yemi	with Desmond Elliot
2016	Okafor's Law (film)	Chuks Okafor (a.k.a. Terminator)	with Omoni Oboli
	My Name is Kadi	Kwem	
2018	Black Rose	Desmond	Feature film directed by Okey Oku, also starring Nollywood actors Ebele Okaro, Lilian Echelon, Betty Bellor, and J.K.A Swanky
2019	The Big Fat Lie	James	with Rita Dominic, Tana Adelana
2019	The Millions (film)	Jerome	Feature film directed by Toka Mcbaror starring Ramsey Nouah, Ayo Makun, Ali Nuhu
2019	Òlòtūré	Emeka	FEATURE FILM & NETFLIX ORIGINALS
	Joba	Lami	
2020	Unroyal	Supporting role	Feature Film - Directed by Moses Inwang, also starring nollywood heavyweights like Pete Edochie, Shaffy Bello, Ik Ogbonna and Matilda Lambert
2020	Who's the Boss	Lekan	Produced, written and directed by Chinaza Onuzo. Also in lead roles Sharon Ooja, Funke Akindele, and Ini Dima-Okojie.
2021	Omo Ghetto: The Saga	Gang Member	with Funke Akindele, Chioma Akpotha, Nancy Isime
2021	Day of Destiny	Young Bankole	with Jide Kosoko, Toyin Abraham, Norbert Young
2021	Sanitation Day	Inspector Hassan	with Nse Ikpe Etim, Belindah Effah, Oga Bello
2022	The Set Up 2	Igwe Mackintosh	with Seun Akindele, Grace Abah, Uzor Arukwe
2023	The Trade	Eric	with Rita Dominic, Chiwetalu Agu, Shawn Faqua, Stan Nze
2024	JAPA	Tope	with Adesua Etomi, Mofe Duncan, Chinyere Wilfred, Layi Wasabi
2025	Radio Voice		with Nancy Isime, Richard Mofe-Damijo, Deyemi Okanlawon, Damilola Adegbite
2025	Gingerrr		with Wumi Toriola, Lateef Adedimeji, Bisola Aiyeola

=== Television ===
Year	Title	Role	Notes
2009	Portrait Of Passion	Michael Umeh	Soap Opera - Unreleased
2009	About To Wed	Scorpion	Sitcom
2009	Tinsel	Doctor Akinlolu Hart	Soap Opera
2010	Bella's Place	Mr. Mccarthy	Sitcom
2010	My Mum&I	Conman/Angel	Sitcom
2010	Catwalq	Alvin	Soap Opera
2010	Married	Allen	Series
2013	Festac Town	Franklin	Web Series
2013	Shuga	Coach	Series
2013	Surulere	Husband	Music Video
2015	Desperate Housewives Africa	Lekan	Series
2015	Taste of Love	Kelechi Pepple	Telenovella
2016	Shampaign	Francis Peters	Series
	Castle & Castle		
2025	Iyanu: Child of Wonder	Toye	Animated series

=== Theatre ===
YEAR	TITLE	ROLE	NOTES
2008	Godledd: The Path to Dawn	Ukemu	University production

== Awards and nominations ==
Year	Award	Category	Result	Ref
2013	Best Of Nollywood Awards	Best Actor In A Lead Role	Nominated	
2013	Golden Icons Academy Movie Awards	Best New Actor	Nominated	
2013	Abuja International Film Festival	Most Outstanding Male Actor	Nominated	
2014	Nollywood Movie Awards	Best Rising Star	Nominated	
2014	Nollywood Movie Awards	Best Lead Male	Nominated	
2014	Golden Icons Academy Awards	Most Promising Actor	Nominated	
2014	Best Of Nollywood Awards	Revelation Of The Year	Nominated	
2015	Africa Magic Viewers Choice Awards	Best Supporting Actor	Won	
2015	Golden Movie Awards	Golden Actor In A Lead Role	Nominated	
2019	Best of Nollywood Awards	Best Actor	Nominated	
2020	Best of Nollywood Awards	Best Supporting Actor –English	Nominated	
2021	Best of Nollywood Awards	Best Actor	Nominated	
2023	Africa Magic Viewers' Choice Awards	Best Actor In A Drama, Movie Or TV Series	Nominated	
