= Up North (film) =

2018 Nigerian film

- Theatrical release poster
- Directed by: Tope Oshin
- Screenplay by: Bunmi Ajakaiye; Chinaza Onuzo
- Story by: Editi Effiong
- Produced by: Isioma Osaje; Zulumoke Oyibo
- Starring: Banky Wellington; Rahama Sadau; Kanayo O. Kanayo; Adesuwa Etomi; Hilda Dokubo
- Cinematography: Pindem Lot; Kagho Bichop Idhebor
- Edited by: Banjo Onyekachi Ayodele
- Music by: Ré Olunuga; Gray Jones Ossai
- Production companies: Anakle Films; Inkblot Productions
- Distributed by: FilmOne Entertainment
- Release date: 28 December 2018
- Country: Nigeria
- Languages: English; Hausa; Pidgin English
- Box office: ₦94 million

Up North is a 2018 Nigerian drama film produced by Anakle Films and Inkblot Productions, and directed by Tope Oshin. The screenplay was written by Naz Onuzo and Bunmi Ajakaiye, based on a story from Editi Effiong. It was mainly shot in Bauchi, with a one-week shoot in Lagos.

== Cast ==
- Banky Wellington as Bassey Otuekong
- Rahama Sadau as Mariam
- Kanayo O. Kanayo as Chief Otuekong
- Adesuwa Etomi-Wellington as Zainab
- Michelle Dede as Idara Otuekong
- Hilda Dokubo as Mrs Otuekong
- Ibrahim Suleiman as Sadiq
- Rekiya Attah as Principal Hassan
- Akin Lewis as Otunba
- Ruth Waziri as Halima 1

== See also ==
- List of Nigerian films of 2018
