= Nancy Isime =

Nigerian actress, model and presenter (born 1991)

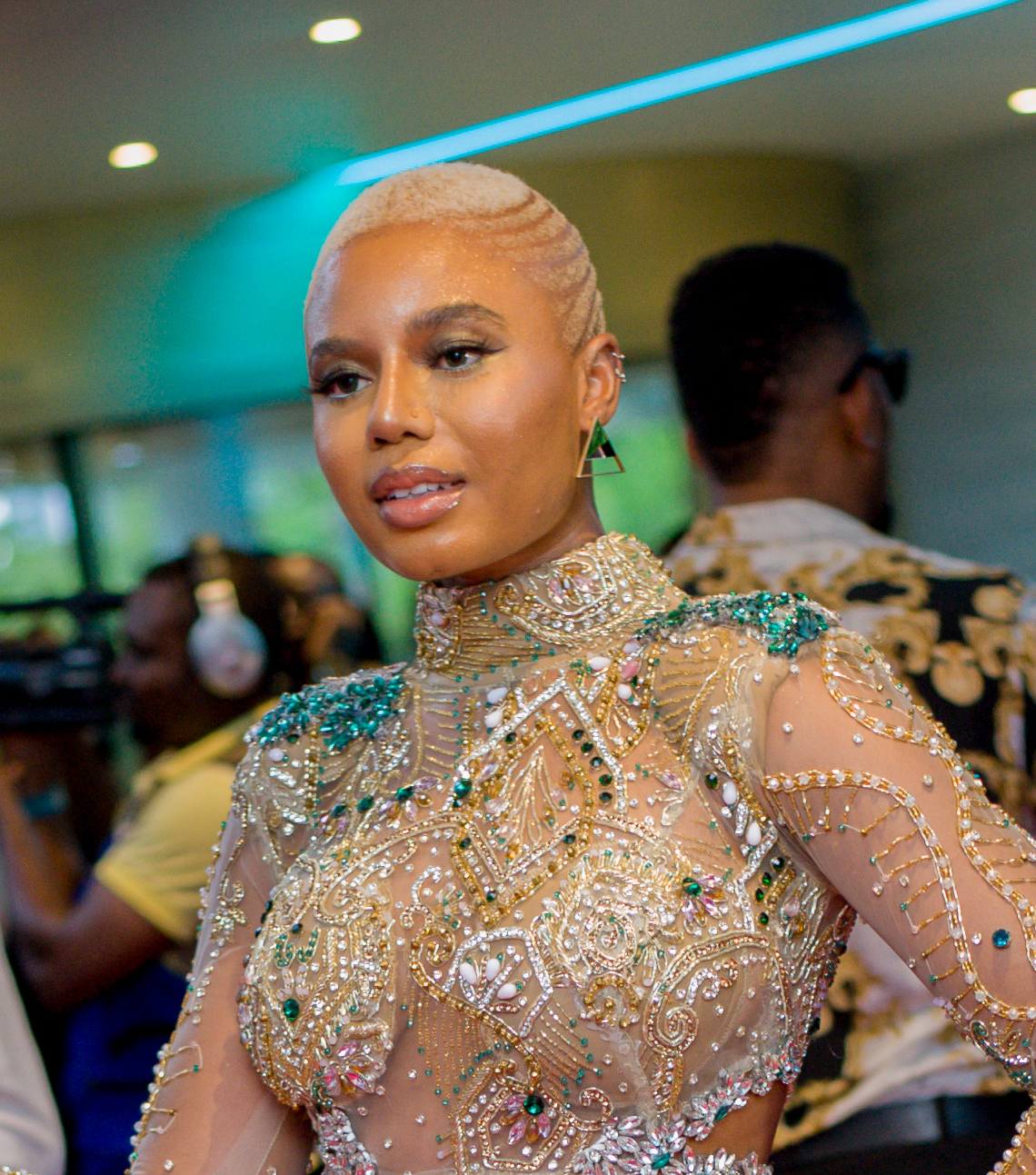
- Nancy Isime at the AMVCAs 2020
- Born: 17 December 1991 (age 34); Edo State, Nigeria
- Education: University of Lagos
- Occupations: Actress; TV Presenter
- Years active: 2011-present
- Known for: Social Media/TV Personality

Nancy Isime (born 17 December 1991) is a Nigerian actress, model, and media personality.

== Early life and background ==
Nancy Isime was born on 17 December 1991 in Edo State, Nigeria. She comes of Esan descent. She lost her mother when she was five years old and was raised up by her father. She spent her early years in Lagos, where she completed her primary and junior secondary education. She later moved to Benin City to finish her senior secondary education.

Isime completed a six-month basic course at the University of Port Harcourt in Rivers State. At that time, when she was between 17 and 19 years old, she said she did not have a place to stay after work because her father lived in Ikorodu, which was far from where she worked as a model. She remembered walking home as late as 2 or 3 a.m. Through a friend, she was introduced to Yemi Alade, who she befriended as well as allowed her to stay in her off-campus apartment until she gained admission into the university. She later studied at the University of Lagos, where she earned a diploma in social work.

== Career ==
Isime began a career as an actress with the TV series Echoes in 2011. She is also a television presenter, known for presenting gossip show The Squeeze, technology show What's Hot, and backstage segments of MTN Project Fame season 7.

In 2016, she replaced Toke Makinwa as the presenter of the popular show Trending on HipTV.

She co-hosted the 2019 edition of The Headies award with Reminisce. She was also the presenter myof The Voice Nigeria 2021. In 2019, Isime launched her own TV show which she called The Nancy Isime Show. In 2020, she co-hosted The Headies award with Bovi.

In 2022, she played Kemi Sanya in the Netflix TV series Blood Sisters. She would later return as same character for the second season which was released on 5 June 2026. In 2023 she starred as Shalewa in Shanty Town.

=== Upcoming projects ===
Isime is cast of Mo Abudu's upcoming film, The Secret Lives of Baba Segi's Wives, which is to be released in December 2026. It is based on the 2010 novel of the same name by Lola Shoneyin.

== Other ventures ==
=== Philanthropy ===
On 20 December 2025 when Isime celebrated her 34th birthday, she built a playground at Methodist Primary School in Ikorodu, Lagos.

== Media image ==
On 28 January 2026, Isime told Morayo Afolabi-Brown in an interview that she was of age for marriage and desires a kind man. Her comments sparked online debate following a resurgence of an X (Twitter) post made by a user claiming that the actress has allegedly spent her 20s with relationships with top actors, film directors, and producers for film roles and pleasure, and now desires "a kind man".

Isime is active on social media, but she announced a break on 1 January 2026 in view of New Year while in Mauritius. An avid reader of Nigerian literature, in 2025, Isime read Chukwuebuka Ibeh's Blessings; Chimeka Garricks's A Broken People's Playlist; Aiwanose Odafen's Tomorrow I Become a Woman; Tunde Leye's Fireflies on the Lagoon; and Umar Turaki's Every Drop of Blood is Red. She added Akwaeke Emezi's Son of the Morning and Oyin Olugbile's Sanya to her books-to-read list.

== Filmography ==
| Year | Title | Role | Ref. |
|---|---|---|---|
| 2015 | Hex | Chioma | |
| 2015 | Tales of Eve | Irene | |
| 2015 | Road to Yesterday | Kike | |
| 2015 | Breathless | Iris | |
| 2016 | On the Real | Amaka | |
| 2016 | A Trip to Jamaica | One Lagos Presenter | |
| 2017 | Hire a Man | Teni Lawson | |
| 2017 | Finding C.H.R.I.S | | |
| 2017 | The Surrogate | Nicole | |
| 2017 | Treachery | Ife | |
| 2017 | Tempted | Ruky | |
| 2018 | Kanyamata | Ruky | |
| 2018 | A Better Family | Lizzy | |
| 2018 | Club | | |
| 2018 | Johnny Just Come | Sandra | |
| 2018 | Liars and Pretenders | | |
| 2018 | My Name is Ivy | Ivy | |
| 2018 | Sideways | | |
| 2018 | Disguise | Nengi/Melvin | |
| 2018 | Merry Men: The Real Yoruba Demons | Sophie | |
| 2019 | Don't Get Mad Get Even | Ada | |
| 2019 | Guilty | Ivie | |
| 2019 | Hire a Woman | Teni | |
| 2019 | Adaife | | |
| 2019 | The Millions | Ivey | |
| 2019 | Beauty in the Broken | | |
| 2019 | Another Angle | | |
| 2019 | Merry Men 2 | Sophie Obaseki | |
| 2019 | Levi | Somi | |
| 2019 | Living in Bondage: Breaking Free | Stella | |
| 2019 | Made in Heaven | Verita | |
| 2020 | Kambili: The Whole 30 Yards | Kambili | |
| 2021 | Creepy Lives Here | | |
| 2021 | The Razz Guy (2021) | Nadine | |
| 2021 | Kylie's Quest | Kylie/ Kara | |
| 2021 | The Silent Baron | Anita | |
| 2021 | Superstar | Queen | |
| 2021 | Hustle | Chichi | |
| 2022 | Blood Sisters | Kemi Sanya | |
| 2022 | The Set Up 2 | Usi | |
| 2022 | Hidden Flaws | Zoe | |
| 2022 | Dear Diary | Zara | |
| 2022 | Obara'm | Oluchi | |
| 2023 | She Must Be Obeyed | Victoria | |
| 2023 | Shanty Town | Shalewa | |
| 2023 | Love in a Pandemic | Bolanle Davis | |
| 2023 | A Ride Too Far | April | |
| 2023 | Honey Money | | |
| 2023 | 2 Sisters & A Friend | Kemi | |
| 2024 | Move Like a Boss | Joko | |
| 2024 | Saving Onome | Tola | |
| 2024 | Wrong Number | | |
| 2024 | Hijack '93 | Iyabo | |
| 2024 | Queen Lateefah | Arese | |
| 2024 | A Fresh Start | Pregnant Woman | |
| 2024 | Everybody Loves Jenifa | | |
| 2025 | Aso Ebi Diaries | | |
| 2025 | Radio Voice | | |

== Awards and recognition ==
| Year | Award | Category | Film | Result | Ref |
|---|---|---|---|---|---|
| 2016 | City People Entertainment Awards | Best VJ of the Year | —N/a | Won | |
| 2016 | Nigerian Broadcasters Merit Awards | Sexiest On Air Personality (female) | Hip TV | Won | |
| 2017 | The Future Awards | Best On Air Personality (Visual) | —N/a | Won | |
| 2018 | Best of Nollywood Awards | Best Actress in a Lead Role - English | Disguise | Nominated | |
| 2018 | City People Movie Awards | Most Promising Actress (English) | —N/a | Won | |
| 2019 | City People Movie Awards | Best Supporting Actress (English) | —N/a | Won | |
| 2019 | Best of Nollywood Awards | Best Kiss in a Movie | Jofran | Won | |
| 2019 | Best of Nollywood Awards | Best Actress in a Lead role –English | Jofran | Nominated | |
| 2021 | Net Honours | Most Popular Media Personality (female) | —N/a | Nominated | |
| 2021 | Net Honours | Most Searched Media Personality | —N/a | Nominated | |
| 2022 | Africa Magic Viewers' Choice Awards | Best Actress in A Comedy | Kambili: The Whole 30 Yards | Nominated | |
| 2022 | Africa Magic Viewers' Choice Awards | Best Actress in A Drama | Superstar | Nominated | |
| 2022 | Net Honours | Most Searched Media Personality (female) | —N/a | Won | |
| 2023 | Eko Heritage Awards | Most stylish personality | ___ | Won | |
