= Inkblot Productions =

Nigerian film production company

- Company type: Private
- Industry: Entertainment
- Founded: 2010
- Headquarters: Lagos, Lagos State, Nigeria
- Products: Films
- Website: www.ink-blot.tv

Inkblot Productions is a Nigeria independent and privately owned film production company based in Lagos, Nigeria.

== History ==
Founded in 2010, Inkblot Productions is a film production company founded by Naz Onuzo, Zulumoke Oyibo, Damola Ademola and Omotayo Adeola.

The company has produced over 20 films and partnered with major streaming platforms, including Netflix and Amazon Prime Video. Notable Inkblot titles include The Wedding Party, The Arbitration, Up North, and The Set Up.

In 2021, Inkblot signed a multi-year licensing agreement with Amazon Prime Video, making it one of the few African production companies with a global distribution partnership.

== Productions ==
Inkblot has produced a couple of notable and well-grossing films and TV series in Nigeria. The company produced The Wedding Party and its sequel, both ranking first and second, respectively, on the list of highest-grossing Nigerian films of all time at the time of their release.

Year	Title	Ref
2015	The Department	
2015	Out of Luck (2015 film)	
2016	The Arbitration	
2016	The Wedding Party	
2017	The Wedding Party 2	
2017	My Wife and I	
2018	New Money	
2018	Moms at War	
2018	Up North	
2019	Love is War	
2019	The Set Up	
2020	Quam's Money	
2021	Who's The Boss	
2021	Superstar	
2021	Charge and Bail	
2021	Day of Destiny	
2022	Palava (2022 film)	
2022	The Blood Covenant	
2022	The Perfect Arrangement	
2022	Far From Home	
2022	The Set Up 2	
2023	Love In A Pandemic	
2023	Big Love	
2023	Small Talk	
2023	A Weekend to Forget	
2023	No Way Through	
2024	Family Gbese	
2024	Muri & Ko	
2024	When Love Strikes	
2024	Saving Onome	
2024	The Betrayed	
2024	Japa	
2025	A Lagos Love Story	
