= The Arbitration =

2016 film directed by Niyi Akinmolayan

- Directed by: Niyi Akinmolayan
- Written by: Chinaza Onuzo
- Produced by: Chinaza Onuzo; Omotayo Adeola; Zulu Oyibo
- Starring: OC Ukeje; Adesua Etomi; Ireti Doyle; Somkele Iyamah
- Edited by: Vicky Akudoju
- Music by: Anthills studio
- Production company: Inkblot production limited
- Distributed by: Talking Drum Entertainment
- Release date: 12 August 2016
- Running time: 112 minutes
- Country: Nigeria
- Language: English

The Arbitration is a 2016 Nigerian romantic drama film, written by Chinaza Onuzo, directed by Niyi Akinmolayan, and produced by Chinaza Onuzo, Omotayo Adeola, and Zulu Oyibo. The film stars OC Ukeje, Adesua Etomi, Iretiola Doyle and Somkele Iyamah-Idhalama.

== Synopsis ==
Gbenga is a charming entrepreneur, running a very profitable tech company, and is the defendant in a lawsuit filed by Dara a computer engineer, whose talent helped Gbenga's company acquire the height it has reached. The colleagues were lovers whose relationship ended when Gbenga discovered his wife was pregnant with their supposed-to-be first child. Her lawsuit seeks compensation for those accounts, and Dara sues Gbenga for coercing her into sex (which counts as rape).

== Cast ==
- OC Ukeje as Mr. Gbenga
- Adesua Etomi as Dara Olujobi
- Iretiola Doyle as Funlaya Johnson
- Somkele Iyamah-Idhalama as Omawumi Horsfall
- Lota Chukwu as Faridah
- Pius Fatoke as Dean
- Sola Fosudo as Tomisin Bucknor
- Beverly Naya as Chiama Sanni
- Gregory Ojefua as Chijioke Utah
- Bimbo Ademoye as Ebele
- Owolo Hosana as Receptionist
- Austin Nwaolie as Henchman
- Isaiah Ogunowo as Barman
- Bukola Ojeba as Student

== Production ==
Shooting of the film took place at locations in Lagos.

== Release ==
The film was released in Nigerian cinemas on 12 August 2016. It also premiered at the Toronto International Film Festival.
