= Daniel Etim Effiong =

Nigerian actor, scriptwriter and film director

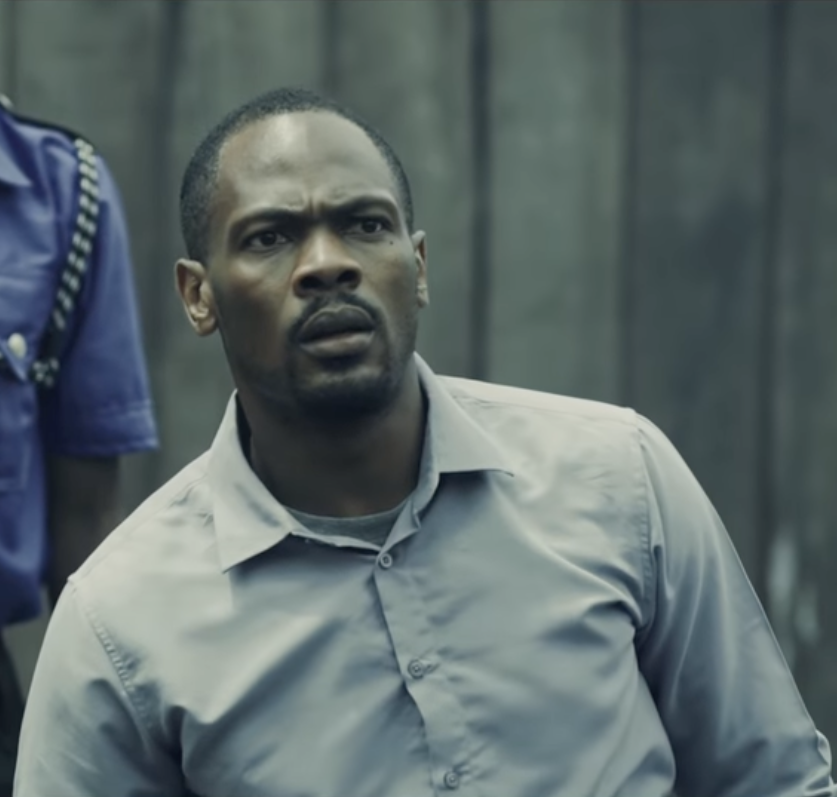
- Born: Daniel Etim Effiong; June 24, 1984 (age 42); Jaji, Kaduna State, Nigeria
- Education: Federal University of Technology, Minna, Niger State, Nigeria • AFDA Film School, South Africa
- Occupations: Chemical engineer, actor, scriptwriter, film director
- Known for: Plan B (2019)
- Spouse: Toyosi Phillips (m. 2017)

Daniel Etim Effiong, also Daniel Etim-Effiong is a Nigerian actor and film director.

== Early life and education ==
Etim Effiong was born in Jaji in Kaduna State, Nigeria. In his youth he lived in Benin City, Edo State; Lagos State; and Abuja. His father, former lieutenant colonel Moses Effiong, was sentenced to life imprisonment after being falsely implicated in the 1985 Mamman Vatsa Coup during the Ibrahim Babangida regime. He was sent to prison when Etim Effiong was one year old. His mother died when he was four years old on her way to visit her husband in jail. Etim Effiong's father was released in 1993 and granted a full presidential pardon by president Muhammadu Buhari in 2020.

He attended St. Mary's Private School in Lagos Island, Lagos State, followed by Government College, Ikorodu, also in Lagos State, for his secondary education. He obtained a degree in chemical engineering at the Federal University of Technology in Minna, Niger State. After a brief stint working as an engineer in the oil and gas industry, he went on to study filmmaking, screenwriting and directing at AFDA Film School in South Africa.

== Career ==
=== 2010s ===
After quitting his oil and gas job, he became a content producer for NdaniTV.

Starting in the early 2010s, Etim Effiong took on roles in a string of web and television series that included Goddammit It's Monday (2012), Gidi Up (2013), Assistant Madams, Castle and Castle (2018) and The Men's Club (2018).

In 2017, he directed a five-minute skit titled Prey featuring Tope Tedela and Odenike Odetola.

In 2018, he made his feature film acting debut in the comedy drama New Money. His breakthrough came the following year in the Kenyan comedy film, Plan B, starring opposite Sarah Hassan and Catherine Kamau Karanja and playing a Nigerian CEO of a Nairobi-based company. He won Best Actor in a Comedy at the 7th AMVCA awards 2020 for his role.

=== 2020s ===
In 2020, he made his directorial debut with Fish Bone, a short film that tackled the issue of drug counterfeiting, and starred alongside Shaffy Bello and Moshood Fattah. That same year he appeared in Storm, another short starring Ike Onyema and Atteh 'SirDee' Daniel and directed by Michael 'AMA Psalmist' Akinrogunde. Also in 2020, his first feature-length film was released, the Netflix documentary Skin, which explored the issue of colorism in Nigeria. It featured Beverly Naya who also served as its producer.

In 2021, he starred in Collision Course, a Bolanle Austen-Peters film inspired by the #EndSars movement. That same year, he reprised his role in the second season of the Netflix legal drama series, Castle and Castle.

He received the Best Actor award for his role in Kofa at the Africa International Film Festival in 2022 and was nominated for Best Actor at the 2023 Africa Magic Viewers' Choice Awards. He also received an Africa Movie Academy Awards nomination for Best Actor in a Leading Role for Jolly Roger, a Netflix crime drama. He appeared in Blood Sisters, a thriller and Netflix's first original Nigerian series which reached the top 10 in 30 countries. Selina, a made-for-YouTube release, was notable for being an early example of the financial viability of the streaming platform for Nollywood filmmakers. The film starred Etim Effiong and Bimbo Ademoye as two lovers from vastly different background. It was well received by audiences and was followed by Selina 2 and Selina 3 later the same year.

In 2023, he starred in several films, including A Weekend To Forget, which performed strongly at the Nigerian box office; the Niyi Akinmolayan film Mikolo, a live action and computer-animated family fantasy film; Different Strokes, a romantic drama by Biodun Stephen; and Selina's Wedding, the fourth installment of the Selina film series. He also starred in A Young Time Ago and Lily of the Valley, a YouTube release co-starring Nancy Isime.

In 2024, he starred in Òlòtūré: The Journey, another Netflix limited series and sequel to the Mo Abudu produced drama Òlòtūré (2019).

In 2025, he directed and starred in The Herd, a thriller that follows the kidnapping of a group of people by gunmen posing as herdsmen. Released in cinemas in October, it debuted on Netflix on November 21, reaching number one on the platform's Nigeria charts.

== Filmography ==
=== TV shows ===
Year	Title	Role	Notes	Ref
2020	Assistant Madams		1 episode	
2019	Castle and Castle	Mike Amenechi		
2018–	The Men's Club	Lanre		
2013	Gidi Up	Folarin		
2012	Goddammit It's Monday	Womilee	2 episodes	
2021	Castle & Castle	Mike Amenechi	15 episodes	
2022	Blood Sisters	Akin	4 episodes	
2024	Oloture: The Journey	Tony	3 episodes	

=== Films ===
Year	Title	Role	Notes	Ref
2025	The Herd		Also director	
2025	Aso Ebi Diaries		Directed by Biodun Stephen	
2023	Barage	Mide	Directed by Emmanuel Akaemeh	
2023	Selina's Wedding	Reuben	with Bimbo Ademoye, Oluwaseun Ayinde	
2023	A Young Time Ago	Older Tayo	with Sophie Alakija, Omobola Akinde	
2023	A Weekend To Forget	Shima	Directed by Damola Ademola	
2023	Lily of the Valley	Bily	with Nancy Isime, Olaye Benjamin	
2023	Mikolo	Maleek (father)	Directed by Niyi Akinmolayan	
2023	Different Strokes	Khalid	With Lateef Adedimeji, Shaffy Bello	
2022	Kofa	Wale	Earned AFRIFF award and AMVCA nomination	
2022	Selina	Reuben	With Bimbo Ademoye, Ivy Antiev	
2022	Jolly Roger	Brume	Earned Africa Movie Academy Award nomination	
2021	Still Falling	Captain Lagi	Alongside Sharon Ooja	
2020	Skin	Director	Documentary Featuring Eku Edewor and Beverly Naya	
2020	Storm	Storm	Short film alongside Diane Russet	
2020	Fish Bone	Inspector	Shortfilm alongside Shafy Bello and Moshood Fattah	
2019	Òlòtūré	Tony	Alongside Beverly Osu, Blossom Chukwujekwu, Ada Ameh	
2019	Makate Must Sell	Gbenro	Alongside Igwe 2pac, Toyin Abraham, Diipo Adeusi	
2019	Plan B	Dele Coker	Lead role	
2018	New Money	Ganiyu Osamede	Alongside Dakore Akande	
2017	Prey	Director	Short skit	

== Awards and nominations ==
Year	Award	Category	Film	Result	Ref
2022	Africa Movie Academy Awards	Best Actor in a Leading Role	Jolly Roger	Nominated	
2022	Africa International Film Festival	Best Actor in a Drama, Movie Or TV Series	Kofa	Won	
2023	Africa Magic Viewers' Choice Awards	Best Actor in a Comedy Drama, Movie Or TV Series	Kofa	Nominated	

== Personal life ==
itim Eong has been married to Toyosi Etim-Effiong since 4 November 2017. They first met in August 2016 while proworking on project. The couple welcomed their first child, a baby girl, in January 2019.
