= James Amuta =

Nigerian filmmaker

- Amuta at the 2026 Toronto International Film Festival.
- Born: 12 April; Lagos, Nigeria
- Occupations: Director; producer; entrepreneur

James Amuta (born 12 April) is a Nigerian film producer, director, aerial cinematographer and publicist born and raised in Lagos. He is best known for his documentary film Nightfall in Lagos which was nominated for the best documentary film in 2018 by the Africa Magic Viewers' Choice Award.

== Career ==
Amuta served as producer of the critically acclaimed Netflix original film Oloture, and as co-producer of the commercially successful film Your Excellency. He is the writer and director of BiCuriosity which was shortlisted as a finalist by the Colorado Film Institute.

Amuta wrote and also served as producer on Collision Course which was selected as the AFRIFF 2021 Closing Film, and also nominated for four awards at the 2021 Africa Movie Academy Award, winning two awards, including Prize for Achievement in Screenplay.

Amuta co-produced Elesin Oba: The King's Horseman, a Netflix film adaptation of Wole Soyinka's Death and the Kings Horseman.

Amuta is also a poet and has a published book Enigma: Beyond the Poet.

== Filmography ==
Year	Film	Role	Note
2017	Nightfall in Lagos	Director/Producer	
2017	Wurukum Roundabout	Cinematographer	
2019	The Bling Lagosians	Cinematographer	
2019	Your Excellency	Producer	
2020	Oloture	Producer	
2021	Collision Course	Writer/Producer	
2022	Win or Lose	Producer/Director	
2022	Man of God	Producer	
2022	Elesin Oba, The King's Horseman	Producer	
2023	Black Harvest	Writer/Director/Producer/Cinematographer	
2024	When the Monsters Come Out	Executive producer/Director	Short film
2024	Toll-Free	Director	Short film

== Awards and nominations ==
Year	Award	Category	Film	Result
2018	Africa Magic Viewers' Choice Award	Best Documentary Film	Nightfall in Lagos	Nominated
2021	Africa Movie Academy Award	Achievement in Screenplay	Collision Course	Won
2022	Africa Movie Academy Award	Best Film	Man of God	Nominated
2022	Africa Movie Academy Award	Best Nigerian Film	Man of God	Won
2022	2022 Africa Magic Viewers' Choice Awards	Best Movie West Africa	Collission Course	Won
