= Òlòtūré: The Journey =

2024 3-part limited series

- Theatrical release poster
- Created by: Mo Abudu
- Directed by: Kenneth Gyang
- Starring: Sharon Ooja; Daniel Etim-Effiong; Omoni Oboli; Beverly Osu; Ayo Mogaji; Patrick Doyle; Stan Nze; Efa Iwara
- Music by: Kulanen Ikyo
- Countries of origin: Nigeria and Mauritania
- Original language: English
- No. of seasons: 1
- No. of episodes: 3

Production
- Executive producer: Mo Abudu
- Producer: Inem King Chinedum Iregbu Sonia Nwosu Heidi Uys
- Cinematography: Malcolm McClain Pindem Lot
- Running time: 30+ minutes each

Original release
- Network: Netflix
- Release: 28 June 2024

Òlòtūré: The Journey is a 2024 Nigerian limited series, a sequel to the Nigerian drama Òlòtūré (2019), directed by Kenneth Gyang and produced by Mo Abudu. The film continues the harrowing story of Òlòtūré, a young journalist whose undercover investigation into sex trafficking and human trafficking thrusts her into a world of danger, survival, and resilience. It was released on Netflix on June 28, 2024, the sequel delves deeper into themes of exploitation, redemption, and the fight for justice. The series stars an ensemble cast including Sharon Ooja, Beverly Osu, Omoni Oboli, Daniel Etim-Effiong, and Patrick Doyle.

The series has received generally positive reviews from critics, who praised its performances, narrative, and action sequences, though some criticism was aimed at its excessive violence.

== Synopsis ==
Òlòtūré: The Journey continues from where the first part - Òlòtūré ended, it continues the story of Ehi an investigative journalist who goes undercover in a bid to expose sex and human trafficking, she soon found herself on her way to Europe where she and the other girls will be exploited accordingly. Fortunately for the girls, a tragedy befell their vehicle on the way to Europe and a narrow window for escape opened for them to return to their family in Nigeria, Ehi refuses to do so and opt to continue the journey. She soon finds herself disguising as missionary in a bid to enter Europe with fake passport, the journey was plagued with a lot of challenges including unknown gunmen attacking their vehicle and killing everyone except Ehi and Peju. Ehi continued to face several challenges on her way, meeting various actors with different intentions, some were friends, strangers, kidnappers, rapists, double-dealing smugglers, and even corrupt security operatives ready to take advantage of her current situation.

== Selected cast ==
- Sharon Ooja as Ehi (Òlòtūré)
- Daniel Etim-Effiong as Tony
- Omoni Oboli as Alero
- Bucci Franklin as Ade
- Pearl Wats as Jewel
- Ikechukwu Onunaka as Chucks
- Beverly Osu as Peju
- Ayo Mogaji as Ehi's mother
- Patrick Doyle as Sir Phillip
- Stan Nze as Ben
- Efa Iwara as Femi
- Bukola Oladipupo as Beauty

== Episodes ==
No.	Title	Directed by	Written by	Original release date
1	"Episode 1"	Kenneth Gyang	Craig Freimond	June 28, 2024
After a failed escape attempt, Òlòtūré becomes entangled in a violent gang war, while Beauty struggles to find her way back home.
2	"Episode 2"	Kenneth Gyang	Craig Freimond	June 28, 2024
Emerging from hiding, Òlòtūré places her trust in a local community, while Beauty, with her life in ruins, finds herself at the mercy of a former adversary.
3	"Episode 3"	Kenneth Gyang	Craig Freimond	June 28, 2024
Òlòtūré encounters fresh dangers on her path, with her only escape leading through the perilous desert and into an unknown destiny.

== Production and release ==
The three-part limited series was released on 28, June 2024. Beverly Osu reflecting on her experience filming in Mauritania despite the harsh weather conditions stressed the fact that the intense experience helped her immerse herself fully in the role. Mo Abudu, the executive producer of the film has stated that it took two years to complete the shooting of the movie, also stressing that while shooting in Mauritania, the cast and crew all had a fun 100-meter race every day in a bid to maintain high spirit and keep everyone motivated during the shooting of the movie.
