= Tobore Ovuorie =

Nigerian journalist

- Citizenship: Nigeria
- Occupations: Journalist, Health Editor, Investigative Journalist
- Employer: Premium Times
- Notable work: Inside Nigeria’s Ruthless Human Trafficking Mafia
- Awards: Deutsche Welle Freedom of Speech Award (2021)

Tobore Ovuorie is a Nigerian journalist, health editor and senior investigative journalist with the Premium Times

== Biography ==
Ovuorie published her first book at the age of sixteen. She embarked on an undercover investigation titled Inside Nigeria’s Ruthless Human trafficking Mafia in 2013 which was published by Premium Times in 2014.

Ovuorie demanded $5,000,000 (about N225million) from EbonyLife films for publishing a film titled Oloture without giving her credit. She claimed that the film was a depiction of her experience in Inside Nigeria’s Ruthless Human trafficking Mafia. The film production company owner Mo Abudu stated that the movie was a work of fiction.

== Awards ==
She is a recipient of the 2021 Deutsche Welle (DW) Freedom of Speech Award.
