= Chief Daddy 2: Going for Broke =

- Directed by: Niyi Akinmolayan
- Written by: Hiedi Uys, Salah Sabiti and Mo Abudu
- Starring: Funke Akindele-Bello, Joke Silva, Rachel Oniga, Shaffy Bello, Kate Henshaw-Nuttal, Ini Edo, Folarin Falana, Mawuli Gavor and Zainab Balogun
- Production company: EbonyLife TV
- Release date: 2022
- Country: Nigeria
- Language: English

Chief Daddy 2: Going for Broke is a 2022 Nigeria comedy film that was released as a continuation of Chief Daddy 1. Written by Hiedi Uys, Salah Sabiti, Mo Abudu, produced by EbonyLife and directed by an award-winning director, Niyi Akinmolayan. The film stars Shaffy Bello, Funke Akindele-Bello, Joke Silva, Rahama Sadau, Mawuli Gavor, Beverly Naya, Falz and others However, upon the release of the film, it met high criticism from the viewers from failing to meet their expectations. Therefore, the CEO of EbonyLife, MO Abudu, apologized to the viewers and promised to take note of their corrections.

== Plot ==
Following the dramatic events of the Chief Daddy 1, Chief Daddy 2 picks up with the Beecroft family ready to indulge in their newfound inheritance. However, their lavish spending plans are disrupted by the arrival of a new character: Laila.

Laila, previously unknown to the family, is revealed to be Chief Daddy's illegitimate daughter. Feeling neglected by the will, she seeks revenge and disrupts the Beecrofts' comfortable lives by taking control of her father's company. This throws the family back into chaos, forcing them to confront their greed and deep-seated rivalries.

== Cast ==
- Shaffy Bello
- Funke Akindele-Bello
- Joke Silva
- Kate Henshaw-Nuttal
- Rahama Sadau, Mawuli Gavor
- Beverly Naya
- Falz
- Linda Ejiofor
- Violet Akhator
- Vivian Baba
- Eso Dike
- Beverly Osu
- Broda Shaggi
- Uzor Arukwe
- Zainab Balogun
- Dakore Egbuson-Akande
- Rachel Oniga
- Chigul
- Nedu Wazobia
