= Lamide Akintobi =

Nigerian journalist and media personality

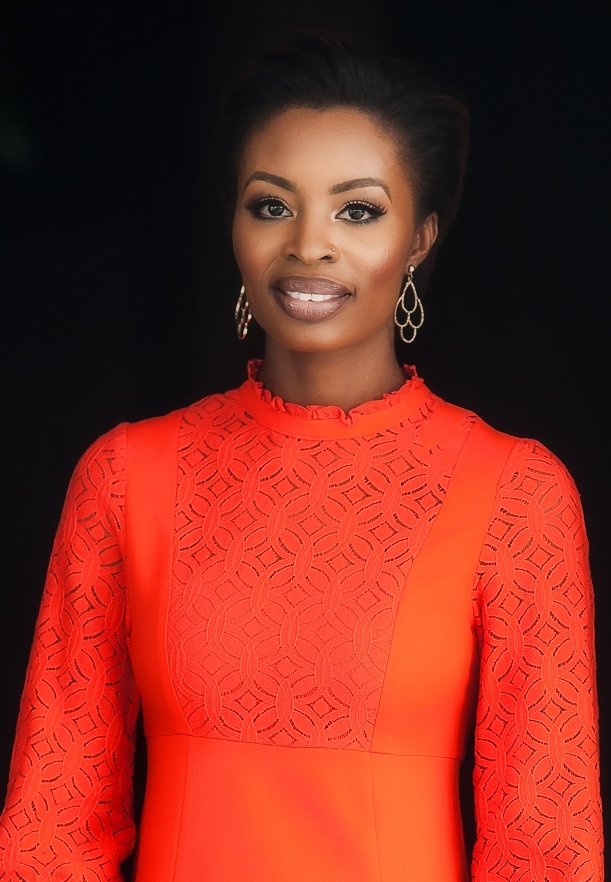
- Lamide Akintobi
- Born: 19 August; Lagos, Nigeria
- Occupations: journalist, television personality
- Years active: 2006-present

Lamide Akintobi (born 19 August) is a Nigerian journalist and media personality. She worked as a news anchor on Channels TV and as a co-host and co-creator on a show called The Spot on EbonyLife TV with Zainab Balogun and Ebuka Obi-Uchendu until the show wrapped in mid-2017.

== Early life and education ==
Akintobi born in Lagos, Nigeria is from Abeokuta, Ogun State. She earned an associate of arts degree in Broadcast Journalism and Spanish from Volunteer State Community College in Tennessee and a bachelor's degree in the aforementioned fields of study from Texas A&M University–Commerce. She also earned a master's degree in International Journalism from City University in London as a British Council Chevening Scholar in 2011. She became a member of the Delta Sigma Theta sorority in 2004. She lived for a period in Tennessee and Texas.

== Career ==
Akintobi worked as a news anchor on Channels TV. She co-hosted a show called The Spot on EbonyLife TV with Zainab Balogun and Ebuka Obi-Uchendu, and also produced and presented a series El Now. EbonyLife TV is Africa's first globally-oriented black news television network, broadcast in over 40 countries. Lamide is currently a freelance producer, presenter and event host whose work has appeared on CNN Style feature.

In 2015, Akintobi was listed as one of the 50 women changing journalism in Nigeria by Women in Journalism Nigeria and as one of the 100 most inspiring women in Nigeria in 2019 by Leading Ladies Africa.

== Awards and nominations ==
Year	Award	Category	Result	Ref
2009	Future Award	On Air Personality of the Year	Won	

== Personal life ==
Akintobi is the daughter of Nigerian musician and producer Laolu Akins.
