= Skin (2019 film) =

Film

Skin is a Netflix documentary produced by British-Nigerian actress Beverly Naya to explore the gap between fair-skinned and dark-skinned women in Nigeria. Colourism, unlike racism means discrimination of people based on skin shades and is prevalent among people of the same ethnic or racial group. The documentary was set up in Lagos to learn about contrasting perceptions of beauty from individuals who have gone through discrimination due to color of their skins.

== Synopsis ==
Skin is directed by Daniel Etim Effiong an hour long documentary that covers stories from Nigerian women that have experienced harsh treatment due to their skin tones. In many African countries, light-skinned women are considered to be more attractive than dark-skinned women and usually have tendency to get selected in areas such as entertainment, marketing and tourism industries. Eventually, the documentary turns to topics about how Nigerian women are obsessed with bleaching.

So many professionals were interviewed in this documentary ranging from doctors to celebrities and photographers. A contrasting moment is the meeting with Bobrisky.
