= Kofa (2022 film) =

Nigerian thriller film

- Directed by: Jude Idada
- Written by: Jude Idada
- Produced by: Jude Idada; Chibie Louis-Okoye; Femi D. Ogunsanwo
- Starring: Ijeoma Grace Agu; Daniel Etim Effiong; Zainab Balogun; Kate Henshaw; Beverly Naya; Enyinna Nwigwe; Bucci Franklin
- Cinematography: Idhebor Kagho
- Edited by: Kazeem Idris
- Music by: Ava Momoh
- Release date: November 10, 2022
- Running time: 116 minutes
- Countries: Nigeria; Canada
- Language: English

Kofa is a 2022 Nigerian psychological thriller film written and directed by Jude Idada. The film stars Daniel Etim Effiong, Ijeoma Grace Agu, Zainab Balogun, Kate Henshaw, Beverly Naya, Enyinna Nwigwe, and Lucy Ameh. It premiered at the 2022 Africa International Film Festival (AFRIFF) on 10 November 2022, where it won the festival's Best Film award.

''Kofa'' tells the story of a number of strangers who wake up in a locked room without knowing why they are in the room. As they try to discover why they are in that room, the tension grows and many of their secrets come out into the open.

The film received positive reception from critics due to its screenplay, acting, and suspenseful plot. The movie also earned several nominations at the 9th Africa Magic Viewers' Choice Awards, including the Best Actor category for Effiong.

== Synopsis ==
Eight unknown people find themselves trapped in a locked room, with no recollection of how they got there, remembering only their names. As they try to make sense of their situation, a man wearing a mask and armed starts taking out people from the room one at a time, making the others solve the puzzle of their situation. In piecing back their memories, they find out that their lives are linked by a past tragedy and have to face the aftermath of their actions.

== Cast ==
- Ijeoma Grace Agu as Nnenna
- Lucy Ameh as Lilian
- Zainab Balogun as Hauwa
- Daniel Etim Effiong as Wale
- Kate Henshaw as Mishelia
- Gina Castel as Tosin
- Charles Etubiebi as Nosa
- Shawn Faqua as Kenule
- Jude Idada as Senator Umar
- Carol King as Mrs. Brillo
- Enyinna Nwigwe as Paul
- Udoka Oyeka as Captain Archibong
- Hafiz Oyetoro as Chief
- Beverly Naya as Franca
- Bucci Franklin

== Reception ==
Writing for The Sun, Henry Akubuiro, described the film as a highly ambitious psychological thriller with the film's suspense and plot twists holding up the viewers' attention despite being relatively weak in the context of the premise used. The reviewer praises the way Idada handled the story by saying that the twists in the story were "top draw" and also compliments the tension created by the movie as well as the confinement. According to Akubuiro, the standout performance in the film was given by Daniel Etim Effiong as Wale. Reviewing the film for NollyCritic, Shalom Obisesan commended the film for its suspense, cinematography, soundtrack, and acting especially Daniel Etim Effiong, Ijeoma Grace Agu, Gina Castel, and Zainab Balogun. However, she criticized the latter part of the film since the plot became more focused on the Boko Haram insurgency and the abduction of Chibok schoolgirls that ultimately created an inconsistent story from what had initially been a good concept, She awarded the film 2.5 out of 5 stars.

Kolapo Mustapha of Nollywood Reinvented praise the film for its characters, directing, and acting performances. Mustapha also lauded Idada's use of misdirection to address broader social issues through the thriller genre. However, he found fault in the way the search scene was executed and picked out some plot twists that he found unbelievable, but concluded that it was still an interesting and effective thriller. The review awarded the film a score of 64%.

== Awards and nominations ==
Year	Award	Category	Recipient	Result	Ref
2022	Africa International Film Festival	Best Film	Kofa	Won	
2022	Africa International Film Festival	Best Screenplay	Jude Idada	Won	
2022	Africa International Film Festival	Best Actor	Daniel Etim-Effiong	Won	
2023	Africa Magic Viewers' Choice Awards	Best Actor In A Drama, Movie Or TV Series	Daniel Etim-Effiong	Nominated	
2023	Africa Magic Viewers' Choice Awards	Best Supporting Actress	Gina Castel	Nominated	
