= Zainab Balogun =

British-born Nigerian actress (born 1989)

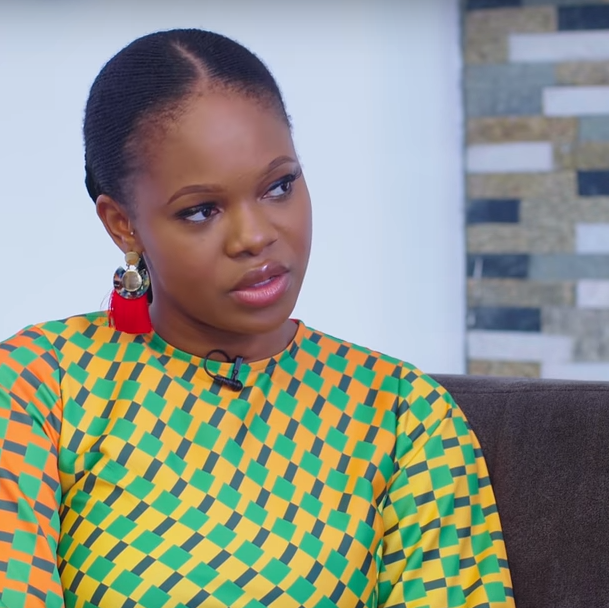
- Zainab Balogun in 2019
- Born: Zainab Balogun; 10 October 1989 (age 37); London, England
- Education: LLB, University of Kent
- Occupations: Actress, television personality, model
- Years active: 2006-present
- Spouse: Dikko Nwachukwu (m. 2018)

Zainab Balogun-Nwachukwu (born 10 October 1989) is a Nigerian actress, model and television presenter. She began modelling at an early age after being scouted at 16. She has been featured in several international campaigns for different brands. She co-founded The J-ist TV, an online entertainment web-series that highlights African culture and a range of topical issues; the series features interviews involving some of Africa's top personalities.

Balogun works as a television presenter for EbonyLife TV, an entertainment television station for which she currently co-hosts and produces The Spot, the channel's leading talk show with Lamide Akintobi. Balogun also appears as a presenter and associate producer on Jumia TV, a teleshopping show.

== Early life and career ==
Balogun was born in London to Nigerian parents, where she was raised with a large extended family, predominantly in Clapham, a district of South West London. She is Yoruba from the Egba subgroup and claims descent from a family from Abeokuta, Ogun State. Due to the nature of her mother's work, she moved around a lot and spent most of her formative years growing up with relatives.

Her secondary school education was obtained at Sacred Heart RC Secondary School. Her interest in the arts began with her regularly taking part in talent shows and school plays. She studied music and eventually went on to join the school choir and later formed an R&B girl group with two friends called Regné (pronounced "reign"). She attended Christ the King Sixth Form College where she completed her A Levels in Law, Psychology, and English Language & Literature. She then attended the University of Kent in Medway where she received a Bachelor of Law degree (LLB).

Balogun worked as a model after being scouted by Premier Models Management at the age of 16. After obtaining her law degree, she began to appear in shows such as BBC One's Material Girl, Bollywood movie Cocktail (2012) and The Charlatans by Ashley Waters. She soon found herself on set with legendary director Christopher Nolan in 2011 for the film The Dark Knight Rises, which she describes as an "unforgettable experience".

Balogun is now a television presenter, who produces and hosts shows for EbonyLife TV, an entertainment television network. She has also produced shows such as EL Now, a daily entertainment news show for the latest in fashion, music and arts. She is currently joined by Ebuka Obi-Uchendu and Lamide Akintobi on The Spot, a daily hang-out talk show.

== Personal life ==
In May 2018, Balogun married Dikko Nwachukwu founder of Jetwest Airways. The pair were traditionally married on 13 May in Lagos, Nigeria.

Balogun splits her time between London, England and Lagos, Nigeria. According to an interview by Elowell Max, Balogun states she appreciates having lived in various cultures and that "something that comes from experiencing life in many different places."

== Filmography ==
=== Television ===
Year	Title	Role	Notes
2012	The Charlatans	Natalia	
2012	Material Girl	host	
2012–present	EL Now	host, segment producer	
2012–present	The Spot	host	
2013	Knock Knock	Hawa	Webseries
2014	VHS: Music Artist Wannabe Skit	herself	webseries
2014	Verdict	Lavena Johnson	webseries
2014–present	Jumia TV	host, associate producer	
2015–	Before 30	Fast Girl, Ekua	
TBA	The Island	Teni Bowen Cole	

=== Film ===
Year	Title	Role	Notes
2011	The Dark Knight Rises	Dancer	Featured role
2012	Cocktail	Party Guest	Featured role
2015	A Soldier's Story	Angela	Supporting
2016	The Wedding Party	Wonu	Supporting
2016	Ojukokoro (Greed) Entreat	Linda Linda	Supporting
2017	The Wedding Party 2	Wonu	Supporting
2017	The Royal Hibiscus Hotel	Ope	Lead
2018	Sylvia	Sylvia	Lead
2018	Chief Daddy	Ireti	Supporting
2018	God Calling	Sade	Lead
2019	Walking with Shadows	Ada	Directed by Aoife O'Kelly
2021	Fine Wine	Temisan	Directed by Seyi Babatope
2021	Collision	Lagos City News Reporter	Directed by Bolanle Austen-Peters
2021	Charge and Bail	Boma Ossai	Directed by Uyoyou Adia
2021	Chief Daddy 2: Going for Broke	Ireti	Supporting
2022	Kofa	Hauwa	Directed by Jude Idada
2024	Last Call		Directed by Shola Thomson-Adewale
2024	On the Edge	Lola	Directed by Temitope Bolade
2024	The Beads	Ranti	Directed by Moyinoluwa Ezekiel

== Awards and nominations ==
Year	Award	Category	Result
2013	Exquisite Lady of the Year Awards	TV Presenter of the Year	Won
2014	Sisterhood Awards	TV Presenter of the Year	Won
2014	All Youth Tush Awards	On-Air Personality of the Year	Won
2014	Nigerian Broadcasters Merit Awards	Sexist On-Air Personality	Won
2014	Exquisite Lady of the Year Award (ELOY)	TV Presenter of the Year	Nominated
2018	The Future Awards Africa (TFAA)	Prize for Acting	Won
2020	Africa Magic Viewers' Choice Awards	Best Actress in a Drama	Nominated

== See also ==
- List of Nigerian actors
