= Charge and Bail =

2021 Nigerian comedy-drama film

- Directed by: Uyoyou Adia
- Written by: Chinaza Onuzo; Zulumoke Oyibo
- Produced by: Eku Edewor; Matilda Ogunleye
- Starring: Zainab Balogun; Stan Nze; Femi Adebayo; Folu Storms
- Music by: Tolu Obanro
- Production companies: Inkblot Productions; Film One Entertainment
- Distributed by: Inkblot productions
- Release date: 21 October 2021
- Running time: 95 minutes
- Country: Nigeria
- Language: English

Charge and Bail is a Nigerian comedy-drama film directed by Uyoyou Adia and co-produced by Eku Edewor and Matilda Ogunleye. The film stars Zainab Balogun with Stan Nze, Femi Adebayo, Folu Storms, Tope Olowoniyan, and Eso Dike in supporting roles. The film tells the story of Boma, a high-flying graduate of law from the upper class who finds herself posted to a charge and bail law firm during her NYSC year.

The film premiered on 21 October 2021.

== Cast ==
- Zainab Balogun as Boma
- Stan Nze as Dotun
- Femi Adebayo as Wole
- Folu Storms as Aisha
- Tope Olowoniyan as Ijeoma
- Moyinoluwa Olutayo as Judge Farida
- Eso Dike as Victory
- Emmanuel Iwueke as Barrister Adetola
- Chigul as Barrrister Nkechi
- Bimbo Manuel as Olisa Ossai
- Chris Iheuwa as Judge Kunle
- Winihin Jemide as Ronke Ossai
- Matilda Ogunleye as Ireti
- Tunji Aderibigbe as Sunday
- Shammah Agah as Clare the receptionist
- Pere Egbi as Ikene Ahuhule
- Nene Aliemeke as Harmony
- Judith Darachukwu as office staff
- Ezugo Egwuagu as Odiri
- Elozonam Ogbolu as Lukman
