= Castle & Castle =

Nigerian comedy webseries

- Created by: Mo Abudu, Heidi Uys
- Starring: Dakore Akande; Richard Mofe-Damijo; Deyemi Okanlawon; Daniel Etim Effiong
- Country of origin: Nigeria
- Original language: English
- No. of seasons: 2
- No. of episodes: 19

Production
- Executive producer: Mo Abudu
- Production locations: Lagos, Lagos State, Nigeria
- Production company: Ebonylife TV

Original release
- Release: present

Castle & Castle is a Nigerian series which premiered in 2018 and is streaming exclusively on Netflix. It is a Nigerian and Africa's first legal series which features the story of a legal family characterized by love, drama and betrayal. The series currently has two seasons streaming on Netflix and stars A-list Nigerian actors like Richard Mofe-Damijo, Dakore Akande, Deyemi Okanlawon, Daniel Etim Effiong and many more.

== Plot summary ==
The series is a story of a law family (Husband, wife and son) running a very successful law firm who now finds themselves defending opposite interest in the legal world which in turn now has adverse effect on their happy marriage and family at large. The story features love, betrayal, trust and many ups and down. The series is shot in Lagos, Nigeria. Season one of the series was released in 2018 and received many positive comments from fans. It was followed by a second season, which was announced by the series' executive producer and co-creator, as well as CEO of Ebonylife TV, Mo Abudu, and released in 2021. Season two featured some new buzz and a lot of new addition of A-list actors like Bisola Aiyeola, Bimbo Ademoye, Mimi Chaka, Elozonam Ogbolu and many more.

== Episodes ==
- Season 1: 13 spisodes
- Season 2: 6 spisodes

== Cast and characters ==
The show's ensemble cast for Castle & Castle includes:

Character	Actor	Occupation	Seasons	
Character	Actor	Occupation	1	2
Remi Castle	Dakore Egbuson-Akande	Managing Partner	Main	Main
Tega Castle	Richard Mofe-Damijo	Managing Partner and Professor	Main	Main
Duke Akintola	Bimbo Manuel	A firm owner, Remi’s father	Main	Main
Kwabena Mills	Deyemi Okanlawon	Senior Associate	Main	Main
Nneka Amadi	Eku Edewor	Senior Associate	Main	Main
Malik Mustapha	Blossom Chukwujekwu	Senior Associate	Main	Main
Mike Amenechi	Daniel Etim Effiong	Senior Associate / Rival	Main	Main
Stella	Anee Icha	Office Manager	Main	Main
Mr. Monday	Kevin Ushi	Filing Room Officer	Main	Main
Captain	Jude Chukwuka	Chauffeur	Main	Main
Ben Castle	Denola Grey	Junior Associate, son of Remi and Tega	Main	Main
Doshima	Dorcas Shola Fapson	Junior Associate	Main	Main
Morenike Athol-Williams	Ade Laoye	Junior Associate	Main	Main
Otunba Ireabor	Patrick Doyle	Remco CEO	Recurring	Recurring
