= Dakore Egbuson-Akande =

Nigerian actress (born 1978)

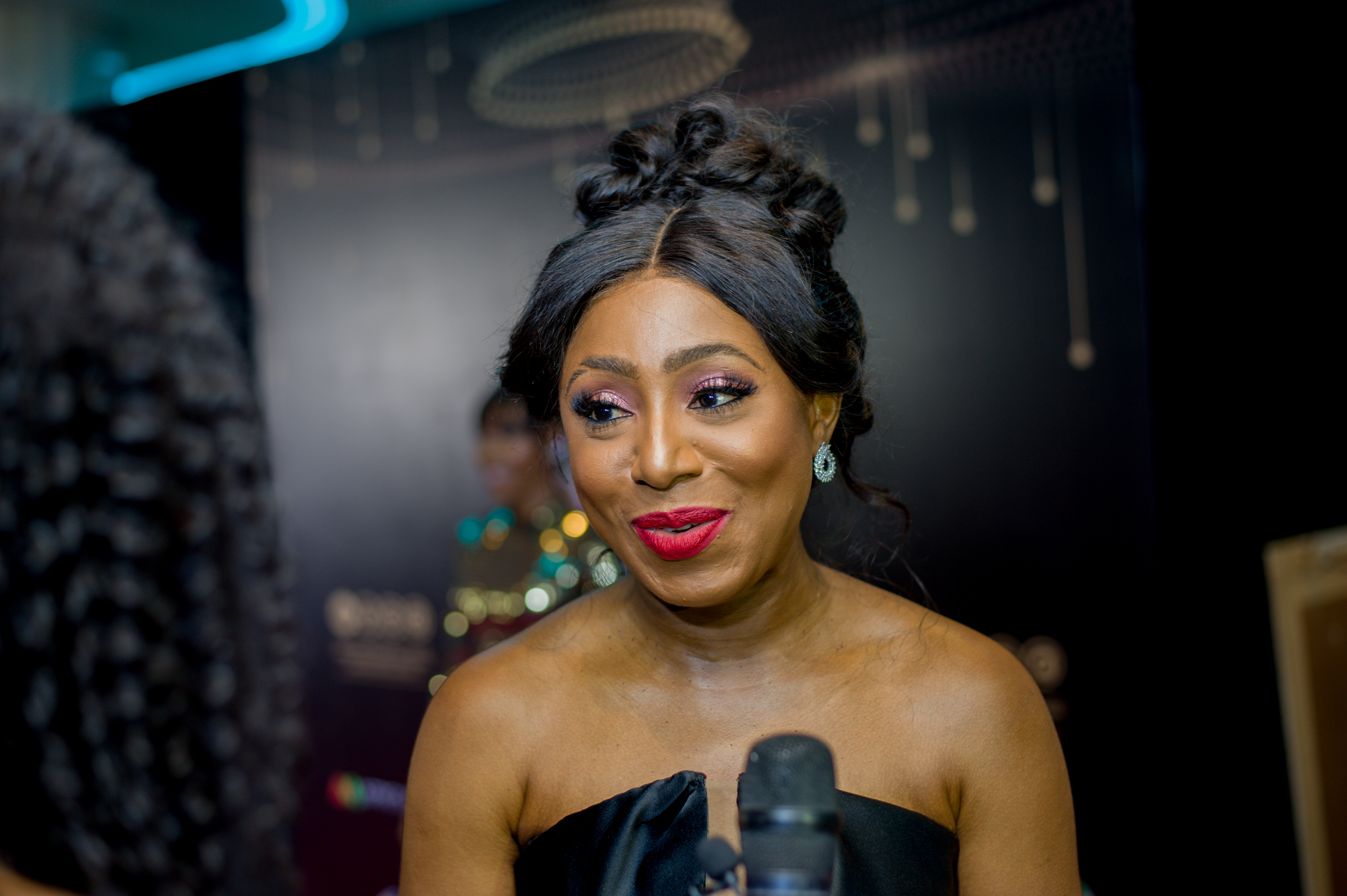
- Egbuson-Akande at the AMVCAs 2020
- Born: Dakore Omobola Egbuson; 14 October 1978 (age 48); Bayelsa State
- Citizenship: Nigeria
- Education: mass communication, University of Lagos
- Occupation: Actress
- Years active: 1999–present
- Notable work: Chief Daddy
- Television: Castle & Castle (2021)
- Spouse: Olumide Akande (2011–present)
- Children: 2
- Relatives: Timini Egbuson (brother)

Dakore Egbuson-Akande (born Dakore Omobola Egbuson; 14 October 1978) is a Nigerian actress. She is an ambassador for Amnesty International, Amstel Malta and Oxfam of America.

== Biography ==
Dakore Omobola Egbuson was born in Bayelsa State as the first child of her parents. She attended Corona School and Federal Government Girls' College in Lagos and Bauchi respectively. She studied mass communication at the University of Lagos but had to drop out due to incessant strikes. She started her career as a vocalist and dancer in a band that once opened for Roy Hargrove at a London event. She is currently married with two children.

In September 2019, Dakore appeared as a main feature in the Visual Collaborative electronic catalogue, in an issue themed Vivencias which translates to "Experiences" in Spanish. She was interviewed alongside 30 people from around the world such as Kelli Ali, Adelaide Damoah and Desdamona. In May 2020, Dakore's interview on the same Visual Collaborative platform republished in a series titled TwentyEightyFour, which was released during the peak of the COVID-19 pandemic, French music duo Les Nubians, Japanese Music composer Rika Muranaka and Nigerian comedian Chigul appeared in the same volume.

== Filmography ==
Dakore has acted in more than 50 films, some of which include:

- Peace of Flesh
- When the Going gets Tough
- Playboy
- Oracle
- Hole in the Heart
- Silent Tears
- Emotional Crack (2003) as Camilla
- Shattered Illusion (2004)
- Annabel (2004) as Lucy
- Men do Cry (2005)
- 11 days & 11 Nights (2005) as Cindy
- Before the Sunrise (2005) as Goretti
- Operation KTP
- Emotional Cry
- High Stake (2006) as Elena
- Caught in the Middle (2007)
- Journey to Self (2012) as Alex
- Far (2014)
- Lunch Time Heroes (2015) as Principal Williams
- Fifty (2015) as Tola
- Entreat (2016) as Ayo Daniels
- Isoken (2017) as Isoken
- Chief Daddy (2018) as Remi Castle
- New Money (2018) as Ebube Nwachukwu
- The Set Up (2019) as Motunrayo
- Coming From Insanity (2019) as Mrs. Martins
- Chief Daddy 2: Going for Broke (2022) as Remi Castle
- One Too Many (2022) as Adesuwa
- Hila (2022) as Georgina
- A Sunday Affair (2023) as Toyin
- Ye! (2023)
- Maniac (2023) as Detective Ibiyemi

=== TV shows ===
- Celebrity Takes 2 (2009)
- Castle & Castle (2018)

== Awards and nominations ==
Year	Event	Prize	Recipient	Result
2014	ELOY Awards	Brand Ambassador of the Year (Pampers)	—N/a	Nominated
2016	Africa Movie Academy Awards	Best Actress in a Leading Role (Fifty)	Fulu Mugovhani	Nominated
2018	Africa Movie Academy Awards	Best Actress in a Leading Role (Isoken)	—N/a	Won

== See also ==
- List of Nigerian actors
