= Two Weeks in Lagos =

2019 Nigerian comedy drama film

- Directed by: Kathryn Fasegha
- Written by: Kathryn Fasegha
- Produced by: Kathryn Fasegha; Sarah Inya Lawal
- Starring: Mawuli Gavor; Beverly Naya; Joke Silva; Jide Kosoko; Toyin Abraham
- Cinematography: Ken Attoh
- Edited by: Ken Attoh; Shirley Frimpong-Manso
- Music by: Nnadozie Ogbudibe "Dozie" Chukwuma Ajoku
- Production company: BalminGilead Movie Productions
- Distributed by: Landmark Cinemas (2020) (Canada); Silverbird Distribution (2020) (Nigeria); ArtMattan Productions (2020) (USA)
- Release date: 19 October 2019; (Nigeria)
- Running time: 117 minutes
- Country: Nigeria
- Language: English

Two Weeks in Lagos (theatrically released as Duas Semanas em Lagos) is a 2019 Nigerian comedy-drama film produced and directed by Kathryn Fasegha, and co-produced by Sarah Inya Lawal. The film stars Mawuli Gavor and Beverly Naya in the lead roles, with Joke Silva, Jide Kosoko, Toyin Abraham and Okey Uzoeshi appearing in supporting roles.

The film was shot in Lagos, Nigeria, and premiered on 10 October 2019. It received mixed reviews from critics and was screened internationally.

== Plot ==
Ejikeme, an investment banker, returns home to Nigeria from the United States with his friend Charlie to invest in Nigerian businesses. Complications arise when Ejikeme falls in love with Charlie's sister, Lola, despite his family's plans for him to marry a politician's daughter.

== Cast ==
- Mawuli Gavor as Ejikeme
- Beverly Naya as Lola
- Joke Silva as Mrs. Chukwuemeka
- Jide Kosoko as Dr. Makinde
- Toyin Abraham as Kemi
- Okey Uzoeshi as Charlie
- Deyemi Okanlawon as Joshua
- Shafy Bello as Mrs. Makinde
- Tina Mba as Sisi Toyin
- Efe Irele as Teniola
- Bambo Adebowale as Otunba Ayodeji
- Busola Dele Davids as Madam Eloho
- Lanre Toki as Efe
- Bukky Wonda as Nma
- Patrick Nnamani as Hon. Chukwuemeka
- Cassandra Nwadiuto as Wande
- Steve Onu as Dele
- Bolu Ogodoh as abused child
- Tope Jegede as Pastor
- Patience Ozomanam as party guest
- Bolaji Rabey as Dr. Makinde's driver
- Daniel Ezeali as Chukwuemeka security
- James Ovat as Chukwuemeka security
- Daniel Ezeali as Chukwuemeka security
- Bayonle Saheed as groom's friend
- Lawal Aramide as traditional marriage MC
- Ayanlola Ayankunle as drummer 1
- Alayande Toheeb as drummer 2
- Joy Moses as party guest
- Salome Tonye as party guest
- Edidiong Urua as man trying to kill child

== Awards and nominations ==
Year	Award	Category	Recipient	Result	Ref
2020	African Movie Academy Awards	Best Film by an African Living Abroad	2 weeks in Lagos	Nominated	
