= Bucci Franklin =

Nigerian actor

- Born: Onyebuchi Franklin Odurukwe; 9 June 1986 (age 40); Rivers State, Nigeria
- Citizenship: Nigerian
- Education: University of Abuja
- Occupations: Actor, TV host

Onyebuchi Franklin Odurukwe (born 9 June 1986), known professionally as Bucci Franklin, is a Nigerian actor, model, on-air personality (OAP), and TV presenter.

== Early life and career ==
He was born on 9 June 1986 in Port Harcourt, Rivers State, and originates from Nkwerre in Imo State, Nigeria. He is a graduate of Theatre Arts from the University of Abuja. He began his career in presentation at Multi-Mesh Broadcasting Company, where he was one of the first OAPs for Love FM 104.5 Abuja, co-anchoring the Morning Show and hosting Abuja on the Move for five years. He also hosted a TV program called RISING STARS for two years and was a pioneer of the TV magazine program focusing on Abuja lifestyle, airing on Africa Independent Television (A.I.T). Additionally, he co-founded the Garki Gazette Abuja newspaper, serving as a correspondent and content developer.

In his acting career, Bucci Franklin has been featured in several Nollywood movies, including Knockout Blessing (2018), Kofa, Rule Number One (2018), Written in the Stars, Breaking Ranks, The Weekend, To Kill a Monkey, and Rattlesnake: The Ahanna Story. He won the Best Lead Actor and Best Upcoming Actor at the Annual Africa Film/Music Awards & Festival (AAFMF) in 2015. He was also nominated for Best Actor in a Supporting Role at the 2019 AMAA, and for Best Actor in a Leading Role at the 2024 AMAA for The Weekend."

== Filmography ==
Year	Film	Role	Notes
2025	To Kill a Monkey	Oboz	
2024	The Weekend	Luke	
2024	Òlòtūré: The Journey	Ade	
2024	Muri & Ko	Banji	
2023	Merry Men 3	Jonas	
2022	Far from Home (TV series)	Government	
	Kofa		
2021	The Razz Guy	Agbero	
2020	Rattlesnake: The Ahanna Story	Nzenozo	
2019	Three Thieves	Alhaji Change	
2018	Knockout Blessing	Dagogo	
2016	Just Not Married	Papi	
2015	Lunch Time Heroes	Andrew	
2014	Bambitious	Frank	

== Awards ==
Year	Award	Category	Result	Ref
2026	2026 Africa Magic Viewer's Choice Awards	Best Supporting Actor	Won	
2025	2025 Africa Magic Viewers' Choice Awards	Best Actor in a Drama	Nominated	
2024	20th Africa Movie Academy Awards	Best Actor in a Leading Role	Nominated	
2022	2022 Africa Magic Viewers' Choice Awards	Best Supporting Actor	Nominated	
2019	15th Africa Movie Academy Awards	Best Actor in a Supporting Role	Nominated	
