= Chinedum Iregbu =

Nigerian filmmaker and poet

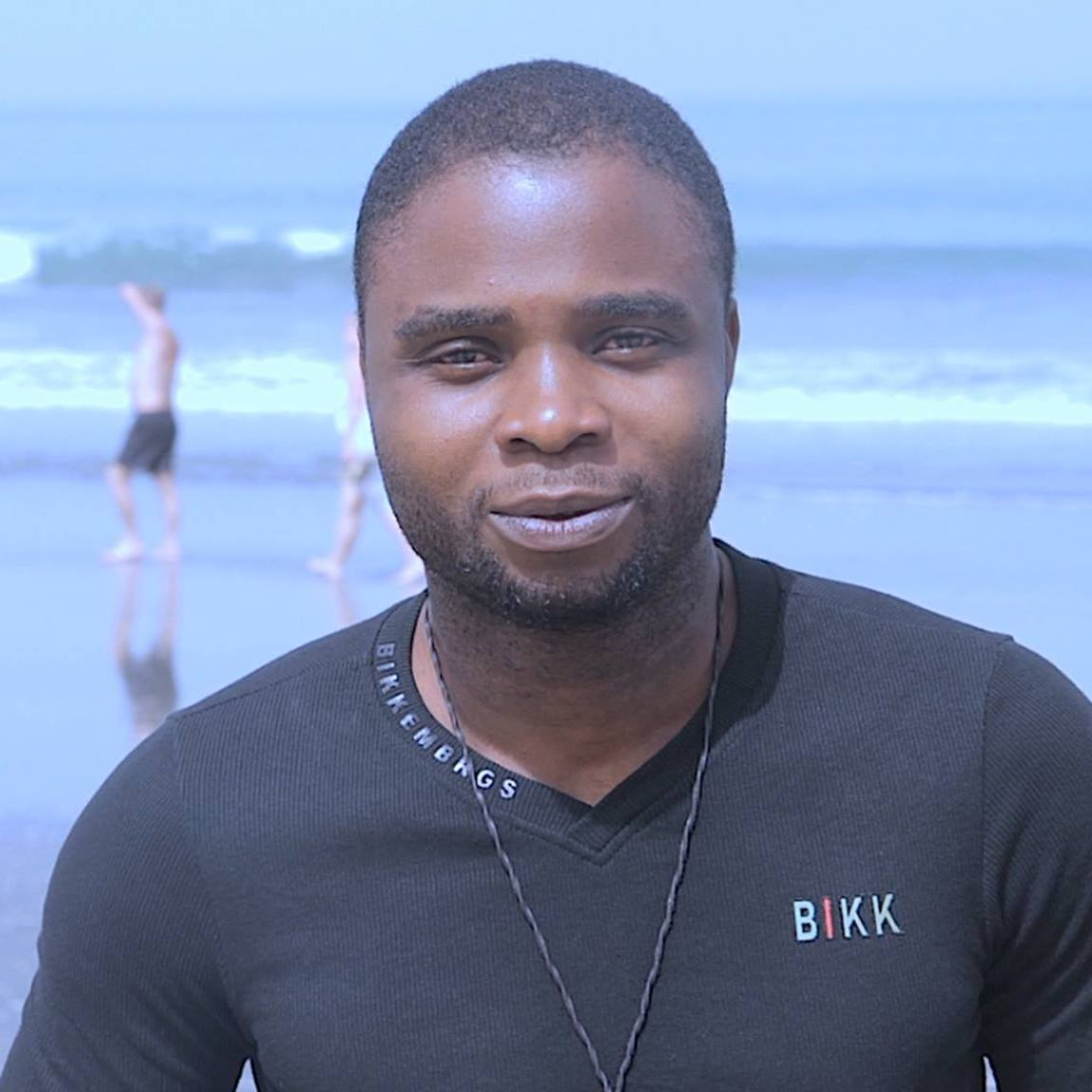
- Chinedum 'Maxzy' Iregbu, at the Senegambia Beach Hotel, Kololi, Banjul, Gambia (2012)
- Born: 1981 (age 44–45); Zaria
- Citizenship: Nigeria
- Occupations: Film director, Poet

Chinedum Iregbu // (born in Zaria, Kaduna State, northwestern Nigeria) is a Nigerian filmmaker and poet. Chinedum is currently the Quality Control Manager for EbonyLife TV, DSTV Channel 165. He is popularly known as Saint Maxzy or Maxzy.

== Education ==
Chinedum Iregbu is a Young Nigerian Film Director, Editor and part-time Cinematographer. He holds a certificate in Film Production from Gaston Kabore's Imagine Film Training Institute, Ouagadougou, Burkina Faso, a diploma certificate in Mass Communication from University of Jos and bachelor's degree in Film Arts/Motion Picture Production from National Film Institute, Jos, located in Plateau State, Nigeria.

== Career ==
His films as a Director includes the award-winning political piece, In Dele Giwa's Shoes, Question Mark, Dud's Culture, selected for the 2008 Berlinale Talent Campus and Anfara, a simulation of one of the causes of civil unrest in prone zones of Nigeria, Which got multiple awards including ‘Best Director, Best Videography, Best Edit and Best Score at the Nigerian Television Authority TVC Legacy Awards 2011, and also won The 2012 Emerging Filmmaker Award at the Silicon Valley African Film Festival with Anfara.

His documentary credits includes: "Point of no return" a commentary of Man's cruelty against animals, Great Commission Movement of West Africa's History, Lalle, a documentary on local tattoo, There is Nothing Wrong With My Uncle, a documentary on the Mysticism of Death and Becky's Journey (2014), a Sine Plambech (Denmark) Documentary on illegal immigrants from Nigeria to the Europe etc.

He is one of the young Talents that was commissioned to film the 20 episodes of Documentaries in commemoration of Nigeria's 50th independence anniversary and have worked on many documentary films commissioned by State Governments in Nigeria including Governor Liyel Imoke and Governor Emmanuel Eweta Uduaghan.

== See also ==
Here's a list of some of the works which he participated in different capacities: Assistant Director, Lillies of the Ghetto, a Gottemburg Funded film, D.O.P, Lemon Green, a Premonition Pictures production, Assistant Director, Blood Stones, a Goethe Institut's Killing Africa, Healing Africa production, D.O.P, Promise, a Johns Hopkins University and USAID Funded project.

Chinedum have also worked for organizations such as Soundcity TV, Aljazeera, AMAA Awards, Copa Coca-Cola, to name but a few, he is currently the Quality Control Manager for EbonyLife TV, Channel 165.

== Awards and honours ==
- Official Nomination: Africa Magic Viewers Choice Award (AAMVCA 2026) - Best Movie - 3 COLD DISHES
- Winner: 2012 Emerging Filmmaker Award “ANFARA – THEY’VE STARTED” (DIRECTOR, PRODUCER, EDITOR) Silicon Valley African Film Festival, Los Angeles
- MULTIPLE AWARDS: Winner: Best Cinematography, Best Edit, Best Score and Best Director “ANFARA – THEY’VE STARTED” (DIRECTOR, PRODUCER, EDITOR) NTA TVC LEGACY AWARDS 2011
- Multiple Nominations: “IN DELE GIWA’S SHOES” (Producer/DIRECTOR) IN-SHORT INTERNATIONAL FILM FESTIVAL, 2011
- Winner: Best Cinematography “ALL SORTS OF TROUBLE” (D.O.P) IN-SHORT INTERNATIONAL FILM FESTIVAL, 2011
- Winner: Best Student Film at the Zuma International Film Festival Abuja, Nigeria with the Film “IN DELE GIWA’S SHOES” 2010 (Producer/DIRECTOR)
- Multiple Nominations: Terracotta Awards (2010). Lagos with the Film “LEMON GREEN” (2009). (Director of Photography) BEST CINEMATOGRAPHY.
- Official Selection: 58TH Berlin International Film Festival’s (2008). Berlinale Talent Campus, Berlin- Germany with the Film “DUD’S CULTURE” (2007). (Director)
- Official Selection: Lonely Hearts Club – NGO's Date Filmmakers BTC Germany 2008 with the script “THE VICISSITUDE” (Writer)
