= Still Falling =

2021 Nigerian romantic drama film by Karachi Atiya and Dimbo Atiya

- Directed by: Karachi Atiya; Dimbo Atiya
- Starring: Daniel Etim Effiong; Sharon Ooja; Kunle Remi
- Release date: 12 February 2021
- Country: Nigeria
- Language: English
- Box office: ₦27.7 million

Still Falling is a 2021 Nigerian romantic drama film co-directed by Karachi Atiya and Dimbo Atiya. The film stars Daniel Etim Effiong, Sharon Ooja, Kunle Remi in the lead roles. The film had its theatrical release on 12 February 2021 on the eve of Valentine's weekend. The film was shot and set in Abuja.

== Cast ==
- Sharon Ooja as Bono
- Daniel Etim Effiong as Lagi
- Bethel Njoku as Eric
- Laura Fidel as Intoh
- Eddy Madaki as Truemoney Executive
- Lulu Okonkwo as Kore
- Panam Percy Paul as Bishop Gowon
- Chavala Yaduma as Xo
- Liz Ameye as Bono's mother / Mrs. Kuku
- Kunle Remi as Tunde
- Abundance Effiong as Associate Pastor
- Frank Abumere as Police Officer
- Clara Chapp-Jumbo as Bono's Assistant
- Innocent Enefola as Bartender
- Lebechi Olorunfemi Miwa as Air Hostess
- Bally O. Nosike as Police Constable
- Ann Ogiehor as Newscaster
- Adetoro Okide as Airline MD

== Crew ==
- Directed by Dimbo Atiya - Karachi Atiya
- Story by Dimbo Atiya
- Produced by Prince Aboki
- Cinematography by Tom Robson
- Edited by Johnson Awolola
- Casting by Mnena Akpera
- Music Edited Shaddi Justin
