= Lunch Time Heroes =

2015 Nigerian family comedy

- Theatrical release poster
- Directed by: Seyi Babatope
- Written by: Moses Babatope; Diche Enunwa; Kene Okwuosa
- Produced by: Don Omope; Seyi Babatope
- Starring: Dakore Akande; Omoni Oboli; Diana Yekinni; Tina Mba; Tope Tedela
- Cinematography: Paul Walman
- Edited by: Joe LaRue
- Music by: Re Olunuga
- Production companies: PHB Films; FilmOne Production
- Distributed by: FilmOne Distribution
- Release date: 28 August 2015
- Running time: 88 minutes
- Country: Nigeria
- Language: English
- Budget: ₦15 million (estimated)

Lunch Time Heroes is a 2015 Nigerian family comedy film directed by Seyi Babatope, and starring: Dakore Akande, Omoni Oboli, Diana Yekinni, Tina Mba and Tope Tedela.

The film tells the story of Banke (Diana Yekinni), a corp member who has been posted to teach in a high school and she has to gain the respect and attention of students and the faculty that doesn't want her around.

== Cast ==
- Diana Yekinni as Banke Adewumi
- Dakore Akande as Principal Williams
- Tope Tedela as Deji
- Omoni Oboli as Governor's wife (Special appearance)
- Wale Macaulay as Mr Goke
- Ade Laoye as Miss Uche
- Kenneth Okolie as Mr Ishola
- Bikiya Graham-Douglas as Mrs Aduwo
- Tina Mba as Mrs Adewumi
- Udoka Oyeka as Reporter
- Bucci Franklin as Andrew
- Uzor Arukwe as Chris
- Ijeoma Aniebo as Ijeme
- Odenike Odetola as Miriam
- Kada Matthew as Rukevwe
- Deborah Oboh as Diekola
- Christopher Ochinyabo as Femi
- Sunshine Rosman as Amara
- Cassandra Rosman as Kishi
- Louie Obioha as Chimamanda
- Donpet Enebeli as Hakeem
- Tunji Aderibigbe as Moses

== Production and release ==
Lunch Time Heroes was shot in Lagos for 16 days. Some of the child actors used in the film were sourced through local churches, and none had a previous professional acting experience. Before the commencement of principal photography, the director, Babatope had got the child actors on film set to play around, in order to desensitize them to the cameras, dollies, cables, lights and the peculiarities of filming environment.

Onset photos for Lunch Time Heroes was released to the public online in March 2015. Trailer for the film was released in July 2015. It premiered at FilmHouse Cinema, Surulere, Lagos on 23 August 2015; with general theatrical release on 28 August 2015. The theme soundtrack for the film, titled "I Believe" by Capital Femi, was released online on 28 August 2015, along with its music video, which features the cast of the film.

== Critical reception ==
The film has been met with mixed critical reception. Amarachukwu Iwuala of 360Nobs commends the film's screenplay, character development and soundtrack, but criticizes the film for having several inconsistencies in its storytelling. She concludes: "Much as the story of Lunch Time Heroes is foreseeable, owing to the title of the film and the information on the promotional materials, one nevertheless enjoys the journey that leads to the final destination". Yvonne Anoruo praises the soundtrack, but notes the lack originality, and several inconsistencies. She comments: "Lunch Time Heroes comes with a very simple plot, and with very predictable twists and turns. It is so focused on staying true to its subject matter and with rather rigid dialogues that it is altogether stiff. At the end of it, one realises that save a few characters, the others are largely flat. There were a lot of improvisations in measures that takes away from the movie. The final product does not elicit any feelings beyond the ordinary and if any, it totters on the edge of basic. Ultimately, for what it lacks everywhere else, the movie makes up for with very adorable child actors". Jite Efemuaye comments: "Lunch Time Heroes is a good effort which is undermined by a less than dedicated attention to detail on the director’s part. Even with all its limitations, it is an entertaining movie, one that can be enjoyed by all members of the family, but it is easily forgettable". Yvonne Williams of Nollywood Observer comments: "Although Lunch Time Heroes wows with its uncommon storyline and brilliant performances from Dakore Akande and Tina Mba, it falls short in its delivery – somewhat un-contagious forced humour, thinness of the plot, overacting amongst other things. However, it no doubt would be a welcome delight for the youth and the young at heart".
