= A Weekend to Forget =

- Directed by: Damola Ademola
- Written by: Damola Ademola, Joy Isi Bewaji, Chiemeka Osuagwu
- Produced by: Inkblot
- Starring: Stan Nze: Uche Montana; Ini Dima-Okojie; Daniel Etim Effiong
- Distributed by: Amazon Prime Video
- Release date: September 22, 2023
- Country: Nigeria
- Box office: ₦9.7 million (September 22 - 25, 2023)

A Weekend To Forget is a 2023 Nigerian thriller film directed by Damola Ademola, following seven friends who get together for a weekend getaway when one of them is found dead. The film features Nollywood actors Stan Nze, Uche Nwaefuna, Ini Dima-Okojie, Daniel Etim Effiong, Neo Akpofure, and Erica Nlewedim.

== Synopsis ==
Seven friends come together for a weekend getaway and reunion party after being apart for a long time, but unsettled rivalry and disputes begin to resurface as one of them is found dead.

== Cast ==
The movie has the following cast:

- Stan Nze as Tito
- Uche Nwaefuna as Lisa
- Ini Dima-Okojie as Layo
- Daniel Etim Effiong as Shima
- Neo Akpofure as Bem
- Erica Nlewedim as Ndali
- Uche Nwaefuna as Lisa
- Elozonam Ogbolu as Ferdy
- Akin Lewis as Chief
- Francis Onwochei as Asaolu

== Box office ==
The film recorded a total gross of ₦9,701,550 between September 22, 2023 and September 25, 2023.
