= Death and the King's Horseman =

1975 play by Wole Soyinka

- Original language: English
- Written by: Wole Soyinka
- Characters: Elesin; Olunde; Iyaloja; Simon Pilkings; Jane Pilkings; Amusa
- Setting: Nigeria, during WWII

Premiere
- Date: 1 March 1975
- Place: University of Ife

Death and the King's Horseman is a play by Wole Soyinka. It is based on a real incident that took place in Nigeria during the colonial era, where the horseman of a Yoruba King was prevented from committing ritual suicide by the colonial authorities. In addition to the intervention of the colonial authorities, Soyinka calls the horseman's own conviction toward suicide into question, posing a problem that throws off the community's balance.

Soyinka wrote the play in Cambridge, where he was a fellow at Churchill College during his political exile from Nigeria. He has also written a preface to the play, explaining what he sees as the greatest misconceptions in understanding it. In particular, he says that the play should not be considered as "clash of cultures." Rather, the play demonstrates the need for interaction between African and European cultures, as per Soyinka's post-Biafran cultural philosophy.

== Plot ==
Death and the King's Horseman builds upon the true story on which Soyinka based the play. It focuses on the character of Elesin, the King's Horseman of the title. According to some Yoruba traditions, the death of the king must be followed by the ritual suicide of the king's horseman, alongside the king's dog and horse, because the horseman's spirit is essential to helping the King's spirit ascend to the afterlife. Otherwise, the king's spirit will wander the earth and bring harm to his people. The first half of the play documents the process of this ritual, with the potent, life-loving figure Elesin living out his final day in celebration before the ritual process begins. At the last minute, the local colonial administrator, Simon Pilkings, intervenes, the suicide being viewed as illegal and unnecessary by the colonial authorities.

In the play, the result for the community is catastrophic, as the breaking of the ritual means the disruption of the cosmic order of the universe and thus the well-being and future of the collectivity is in doubt. The community blames Elesin as much as Pilkings, accusing him of being too attached to the earth to fulfil his spiritual obligations. Events lead to tragedy when Elesin's son, Olunde, who has returned to Nigeria from studying medicine in Europe, takes on the responsibility of his father and commits ritual suicide in his place so as to restore the honour of his family and the order of the universe. Consequently, Elesin kills himself, condemning his soul to a degraded existence in the next world. In addition, the dialogue of the native suggests that this may have been insufficient and that the world is now "adrift in the void".

Another Nigerian playwright, Duro Ladipo, had already written a play in the Yoruba language based on this incident, called Oba waja ("The King is Dead").

== Themes and motifs ==
- Duty
- Anti-colonialism is considered a theme by some scholars based on aspects of the text, but Soyinka specifically calls the intervention by the colonial administrator "an incident, a catalytic incident merely" in the "Author's Note" prepended to the play.

=== Yoruba proverbs ===
Almost every character in Death and the King's Horseman at some point uses a traditional Yoruba proverb. Through his vast knowledge of Yoruba proverbs, Soyinka is able to endow his play with a strong Yoruba sentiment.

Characters often employ Yoruba proverbs primarily as a means of bolstering their opinions and persuading others to take their point of view.

The Praise-singer gets annoyed with Elesin for his decision to take a new wife and tries to dissuade him:

Because the man approaches a brand-new bride he forgets the long faithful mother of his children.
Ariyawo-ko-iyale

Similarly, Iyaloja tries to admonish Elesin against his earthly attachments and stay true to the ritual upon which the good of his society depended:

Eating the awusa nut is not so difficult as drinking water afterwards.
Ati je asala [awusa] ko to ati mu omi si i.

Another common way in which Soyinka uses proverbs is with Elesin. Elesin himself uses several proverbs in order to convince his peers that he is going to comply with their ritual and thus join the ancestors in orun:

The kite makes for wide spaces and the wind creeps up behind its tail; can the kite say less than thank you, the quicker the better?
Awodi to'o nre Ibara, efufu ta a n'idi pa o ni Ise kuku ya.

The elephant trails no tethering-rope; that king is not yet crowned who will peg an elephant.
Ajanaku kuro ninn 'mo ri nkan firi, bi a ba ri erin ki a ni a ri erin

The river is never so high that the eyes of a fish are covered.
Odu ki ikun bo eja l'oju

The final way in which proverbs appear in the play is when Iyaloja and the Praise-singer harass Elesin while he is imprisoned for failing to complete his role within the ritual:

What we have no intention of eating should not be held up to the nose.
Ohun ti a ki i je a ki ifif run imu

We said you were the hunter returning home in triumph, a slain buffalo pressing down on his neck; you said wait, I first must turn up this cricket hole with my toes.
A ki i ru eran erin lori ki a maa f'ese wa ire n'ile

The river which fills up before our eyes does not sweep us away in its flood.
Odo ti a t'oju eni kun ki igbe 'ni lo

== Performances ==
Recording of a scene in Death and the King's Horseman which showed at TerraKulture

Recording of a scene in Death and the King's Horseman which showed at TerraKulture

Written in five scenes, it is performed without interruption. Soyinka himself has directed important American productions, in Chicago in 1976 and at Lincoln Center in New York in 1987, but according to Andrew Gumbel, the play "has been much more widely admired than performed".

The British premiere was directed by Phyllida Lloyd at the Royal Exchange Theatre in Manchester in 1990. It starred George Harris and Claire Benedict.

The play was performed at London's Royal National Theatre beginning in April 2009, directed by Rufus Norris, with choreography by Javier de Frutos and starring Lucian Msamati. The play was also staged by the St. Louis Black Repertory Theater February 2008, directed by Olusegun Ojewuyi, who has been dramaturge for the Oregon Shakespeare's production. It was performed at the Oregon Shakespeare Festival from February 14 to July 5, 2009, as well. A Yoruba translation Iku Olokun Esin was also performed at the National Theater, Lagos, Nigeria, directed by Olusegun Ojewuyi (thus making him the first and only director to have staged the play in both English and in Yoruba – the language and culture of the play).

In 2021, it was performed on stage at Terra Kulture, directed by Bolanle Austen-Peters in collaboration with MTN Foundation. It starred Olarotimi Michael Fakunle as Elesin Oba and Mawuyon Ogun as Iyaloja.

In 2021, the Crane Creations Theatre Company had led a Play Date event of Death and the King's Horseman. This monthly play reading is held by a group of professional theatre artists for the purpose of spreading and increasing appreciation of playwrights from around the world.

It was included in the 2022 program of Canada's Stratford Festival, and directed by Tawiah M'Carthy.

In 2025, Utopia Theatre and Sheffield Theatres staged a production from 3-8 February at The Crucible Theatre, Sheffield, directed by Mojisola Kareem, and featuring Wale Ojo as Elesin and Kehinde Bankole as Iyaloja.

== Translations ==
Russian: by Andrey Kistyakovsky, 1987

Yorùbá: by Akinwunmi Ishola, 1994

Yorùbá (for a screen adaptation) by Kola Tubosun, 2022

== Adaptation ==
A film adaptation directed by playwright Biyi Bandele (with screenplay translated into Yorùbá by Nigerian linguist Kola Tubosun) and co-produced by Netflix and Ebonylife TV titled Elesin Oba, The King's Horseman had its world premier at the Toronto International Film Festival in September 2022. The film stars Odunlade Adekola, Shaffy Bello, Brymo, Deyemi Okanlawon, Omowunmi Dada, Jide Kosoko, Kevin Ushi, Jenny Stead, Mark Elderkin, Langley Kirkwood, Taiwo Ajai-Lycett, and Joke Silva.

== See also ==
- Yoruba religion
- Yoruba literature
- Postcolonial literature
- List of Nigerian writers
