= Chigul =

Nigerian comedian (born 1976)

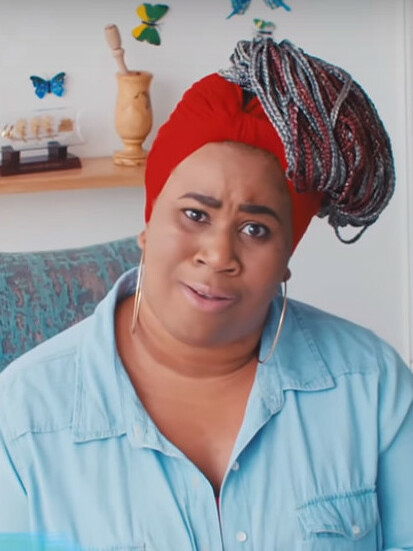
- Chigul in 2019
- Born: Chioma Omeruah; 14 May 1976 (age 50); Ikeja, Lagos, Nigeria
- Education: Delaware State University
- Occupations: Actress; comedian; emcee; talk show host
- Known for: Voices and characters
- Notable work: Out of Luck; Her Matters
- Parent: Samson Omeruah (father)
- Website: theonlychigul.com

Signature
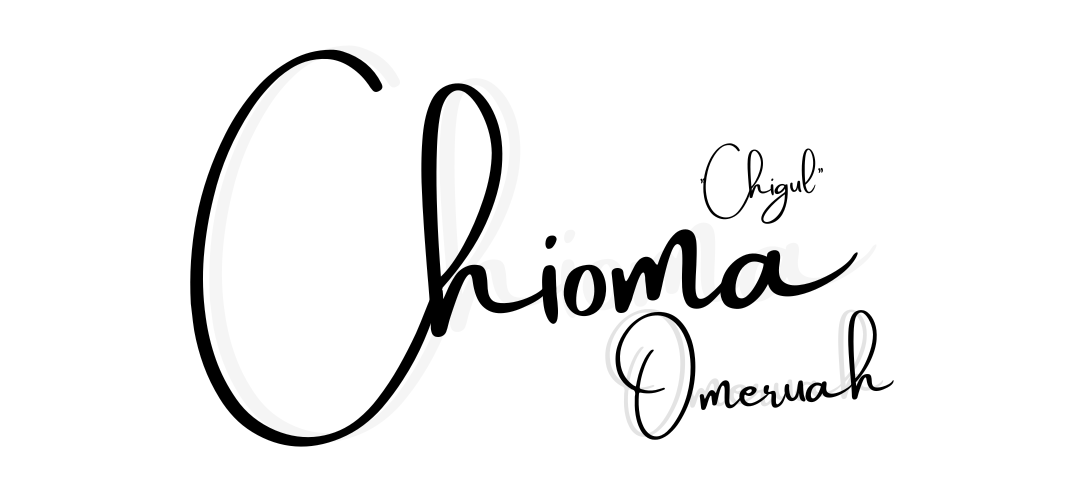

Chioma Omeruah (born 14 May 1976), better known as Chigul, is a Nigerian comedian, singer and actress who is known for her accents and comedic characters.

== Early life ==
Omeruah was born in Yaba, Lagos to Igbo parents. She moved away whilst still a baby. She is the second child of four children of Air Commodore Samson Omeruah and Mrs Omeruah.

== Education ==
She had her primary and secondary education in Lagos. During her secondary school days, she attended two Air Force secondary schools one in Jos, Plateau State, northern Nigeria and the other in Ikeja, Lagos State, southwest Nigeria. After her secondary school, she entered Abia State University (ABSU). She attended ABSU for three months. In 1994, she left ABSU to study Criminal Law at Delaware State University, ⁣ at her father's request. This was not a success, so she left after two years to study French Education at Delaware State University. Omeruah is a polyglot and can speak 5 languages fluently. She returned to Nigeria after twelve years in America.

== Career ==
She initially became a singer under the name C-Flow, but this has been subsumed by her characters – principal of which is Chigul. Chigul speaks in a strong Igbo accent. Chigul was first heard as a recording of the song "Kilode" sent by Omeruah to her friends, but the sound was soon re-sent around Nigeria. Chigul has been married, but this ended with no joint children.

Omeruah has twelve characters, but she is known as "Chigul" after her most well-known invention. She has been interviewed and lauded by a number of media outlets. She had given TEDx talks and appeared as a character in the Nollywood film Road to Yesterday. In 2015 she appeared as a guest on the single "Karishika" by Falz. She was a 2014 honouree as the “Comedienne of The Year” at The Sisterhoods Award Ceremony.

In May 2020, Omeruah appeared in the Visual Collaborative electronic catalogue, in an issue called TwentyEightyFour, she was featured in the same issue with Dakore Akande, Oliver Nakakande and Coppé.

In September 2022, Chioma Omeruah produced and hosted Her Matters, a talk-show series addressing pressing issues affecting women globally. The show provides a platform for professionals to share their expertise and personal experiences, focusing on sensitive subjects related to women's health and welfare. By covering a wide range of topics, Her Matters aims to empower women and raise awareness through informed discussions and relatable stories.

== Personal life ==
Her father is said to be one of the best things that happened in football. Her late dad was a three time minister for information, youth, sports and culture. He was in charge in 1985 when the Golden Eaglets won the Inaugural FIFA under-16 World Championship. Chioma speaks 5 languages French, Spanish, Igbo, Hausa and English.

== Filmography ==
- Out of Luck (2015)
- Road to Yesterday (2015) – Onome
- Remember Me (2016) – Sissy
- The Wedding Party 2: Destination Dubai (2017) – Female Immigration Officer
- Scorned (2017) – Chigul
- Wives on Strike: The Revolution (2017) – Iyawo Prince
- Banana Island Ghost (2017) – Ijeoma
- Prince of Deceit (2017) – Onome
- Relatives (2017) – Angela
- Chief Daddy (2018) – Chuchu
- Crazy People (2018) – Lucy
- Bandits (2018) – Philomena
- The Ghost and the Tout (2018) – Chigirl
- 200 Million (2018) – Chigirl
- She is (2019) – Ojugo
- Makate Must Sell (2018) – Chioma
- Dead Rite (2019) – Chigul
- The Reunion (2019) – Chioma Omeruah
- Your Excellency (2019) – Madam Echejile
- Ada the Country (2020) – Nkem
- Omo Ghetto:The Saga (2020) – Amaka
- Eyimofe (This is my Desire) (2020) – Mama Esther
- Charge and Bail (2021) – Barrister Nkechi
- King of Boys: The Return of the King (2021) – Madam Chijioke
- Chief Daddy 2: Going for Broke (2022) – Chuchu
- Inside Life (2022)
- Raised Apart (2023) -
- The Beads (2024) – Aunty Adanna
- Scama O Rama (2024)

== Internet and television ==
- Her Matters (2022) – Executive producer and host

== Television shows ==
- HQ Barbers
- Relatives (2017)

== Awards and nominations ==
Year	Awards	Category	Result	Ref
2021	Net Honours	Most Popular Media Personality (female)	Nominated	

== See also ==
- List of Igbo people
- List of Nigerian comedians
- List of Nigerian actresses
