= Elesin Oba: The King's Horseman =

2022 Nigerian Film by Biyi Bandele

- Directed by: Biyi Bandele
- Screenplay by: Biyi Bandele (translated into Yoruba by Kola Tubosun)
- Based on: Death and the King's Horseman by Wole Soyinka
- Produced by: Mo Abudu; Quinty Pillay; Heidi Uys; Adeola Osunkojo; Judith Audu; James Amuta
- Starring: Odunlade Adekola; Shaffy Bello; Olawale Ibrahim Ashimi; 2 Milly Star; Deyemi Okanlawon; Omowunmi Dada; Jide Kosoko; Kevin Ushi; Jenny Stead; Mark Elderkin; Langley Kirkwood; Taiwo Ajai-Lycett; Joke Silva
- Production companies: Ebonylife TV; Netflix
- Distributed by: Netflix
- Release dates: 9 September 2022 (TIFF); 28 October 2022 (Nigeria); 4 November 2022 (Netflix)
- Running time: 96 minutes
- Country: Nigeria
- Languages: Yoruba; English

Elesin Oba, The King's Horseman is a 2022 Yoruba-language Nigerian historical drama film directed by Biyi Bandele and distributed by Netflix, based on Wole Soyinka's Death and the King's Horseman, a stage play he wrote while in Cambridge, where he was a fellow student at Churchill College during his political exile from Nigeria, and it is based on a real incident that took place in Yorubaland during British Colonial rule. The film stars Odunlade Adekola as the titular character, with Shaffy Bello, Brymo, Deyemi Okanlawon, Omowunmi Dada, Jide Kosoko, Langley Kirkwood, Joke Silva amongst others in supporting roles.

== Plot ==
The film is based on a true story, set in the 1940s Oyo Town, southwestern Nigeria. The king has just died, and as tradition demands, Elesin Oba must perform a ritual suicide in order to join his dead king in the afterlife so that the king may gain free passage into the land of the gods, thus blocking disaster from befalling the community. Elesin Oba's sexual appetites cause him to shirk, which leads to a mortal confrontation with the British and with devastating consequences. When the horseman is unable to fulfill his final responsibility, it is believed that the King's ghost wanders the earth, spelling calamity for the land and its people. Also, due to his inability to fulfil his duty, his son, Olunde, takes his place in the ritual.

== Cast ==
- Odunlade Adekola as Elesin
- Shaffy Bello as Iyaloja
- Ọlawale Ọlọfọrọ (Brymo) as Praise Singer
- Deyemi Okanlawon as Olunde
- Omowunmi Dada as Bride
- Jide Kosoko as Sergeant Amusa
- 2 Milly Star as Blessing
- Kevin Ushi as Joseph
- Jenny Stead as Jane
- Mark Elderkin as Simon
- Langley Kirkwood as Resident
- Taiwo Ajai-Lycett as Madam Taiwo
- Joke Silva as Madam Bola
- Fares Boulos as Aide De Camp
- Drikus Volschenk: The Prince

== Production ==
The film is co-produced by Ebonylife TV Studio and Netflix and is adapted for screen and directed by Biyi Bandele. The screenplay was translated into Yorùbá, and the film subsequently subtitled into English, by Nigerian linguist Kola Tubosun, a decision described as "one of [the film's] more ticklish conceits" and “the only way to make the film immediately accessible to a global audience.” The movie premiered at the 2022 Toronto International Film Festival (TIFF) on 9 September 2022 and was released in Nigerian cinemas on 28 October 2022 followed by a Netflix release on 4 November.

It is Soyinka's first work to be made into a motion picture since the 1970 film Kongi's Harvest by Ossie Davies and the first Yoruba-language film to premiere at TIFF. The director, Biyi Bandele, passed away shortly before the movie's premiere, in August 2022.

== Reception ==
There has been feedback to the film since its release. The film has been described as colourful and enjoyable. The film was also lauded for highlighting the importance of tradition.
