= Blood Sisters (TV series) =

Nigerian television series

- Theatrical poster
- Genre: Thriller crime family saga
- Directed by: Biyi Bandele; Kenneth Gyang; Season 1: Kayode Kasum; Daniel Oriahi; Season 2
- Starring: Ini Dima-Okojie; Nancy Isime; Kate Henshaw; Wale Ojo; Deyemi Okanlawon; Gabriel Afolayan; Kehinde Bankole; Tope Tedela
- Music by: Kulanen Ikyo
- Country of origin: Nigeria
- Original language: English
- No. of seasons: 2
- No. of episodes: 8

Production
- Producer: Mo Abudu
- Running time: 50+ minutes

Original release
- Network: Netflix
- Release: 5 May 2022 – present

Blood Sisters is a Nigerian thriller television series. Regarded as the first Nigerian Netflix Original series, it stars Ini Dima-Okojie, Nancy Isime, Ramsey Nouah, Kate Henshaw, Wale Ojo, Kehinde Bankole, Deyemi Okanlawon, Gabriel Afolayan, and Tope Tedela. The first season with four episodes was directed by Biyi Bandele and Kenneth Gyang, and premiered on 5 May 2022 on Netflix in collaboration with Mo Abudu's Ebonylife TV. The second season was released on 5 June 2026, and directed by Kayode Kasum and Daniel Oriahi.

== Premise ==
Sarah Duru is on a run with her childhood friend Kemi Sanya, after both kill Sarah's husband to-be, Kola Ademola. Unknown by the Ademola family about his death, however, he is declared dead a few days later. His body gets discovered in a shallow grave later after wild dogs' attack therein, thereby exposing Sarah and Kemi as fugitives. Both move away from the city to another but yet are faced by hitmen sent by the Ademola family. As everyone tries to find Kola's killer, more secrets about the deceased and his family becomes revealed.

Sarah and Kemi are seen arrested in Season 2. They struggled with living as prisoners. Both would later escape after being convicted and failed by the Nigerian legal system; Sarah is sentenced to life imprisonment while Kemi is sentenced to death by hanging. Both would later conspire against the family and bringing Uduak Ademola, Kola's mother, to justice.

== Cast and characters ==
- Ini Dima-Okojie as Sarah Duru, a bride who struggles with the violent state of her fiancé
- Nancy Isime as Kemi Sanya, Sarah's friend since childhood and her maid of honour
- Deyemi Okanlawon as Kola Ademola, the deceased bridegroom known for his several violent attacks to women and taking portraits of them in pains
- Gabriel Afolayan as Femi Ademola, the older brother of Kola who is seen as a weakling by his mother
- Ramsey Nouah as Uncle B, a hitman who works for the Ademola family
- Kate Henshaw as Uduak Ademola, mother of Kola who protected her son even after encountering all his bad attitudes
- Kehinde Bankole as Yinka Ademola
- Genoveva Umeh as Timeyin Ademola, the sister of Kola who was sent to a rehabilitation centre and returning, gets appointed as the CEO of the Ademola family business in Season 2
- Uche Jombo as Sarah's mother
- Wale Ojo as Inspector Joe
- Tope Tedela as Dr Adeboye/The Good Doctor
- Toke Makinwa as Abby
- Segun Arinze as Tijano
- Daniel Etim-Effiong as Akin Bassey, a friend of Kola who, though he knows his friend's bad acts, remained on Ademola family's side for the sake of benefits. In season 2, he becomes a lover of Kola's mother
- Ibrahim Suleiman as Kenny
- Keppy Ekpenyong as Ifeanyi, Sarah's father
- Maurice Sam as Blade
- Jahdiel Olaoluwa Akinrowo as FJ Ademola
- Omobola Akinde as Big Girl
- Sunday Aaron as Hotel Security
- Zara Udofia Ejoh as Sister Rose

== Episodes ==
No.	Title	Directed by	Written by	Original release date
1	"It's a Bloody Affair"	Biyi Bandele & Kenneth Gyang	Craig Freimond	5 May 2022
It was going to be a lavish wedding ceremony between Kola (Deyemi Okanlawon) and Sarah (Ini Dima-Okojie), everything was set for the lavish wedding of the time, until Sarah and Kemi (Nancy Isime) get caught up in a very difficult situation which led to the accidental killing of Kola, however to the public, Kola had disappeared mysteriously, Kemi and Sarah tried to cover their error by resorting to burying Kola's body in a shallow grave. However, before the wedding, Kola's elder brother, Femi (Gabriel Afolayan) together with his wife had plotted to kill Kola, so that Femi could take his rightful position as the heir of the family.
2	"Run Sisters Run"	Biyi Bandele & Kenneth Gyang	Craig Freimond	5 May 2022
Kola is now missing, unknown to the public that he is dead, Kemi and Sarah discovered that while disposing of Kola's body, they did not completely cover their tracks, as one of the Photographers for the event caught them on camera putting Kola's body into Kemi's car and now, the photographer is blackmailing them and requesting for money. Kemi thought the best way to salvage the situation was to kill the photographer, so they went to look for a gun, and tried to kill the photographer who outpowered Kemi and collected the gun, however, Sarah completed the task by running him over with a car. However, the police investigation intensifies as they discover a CCTV footage from the event showing Kemi and Sarah moving Kola's body out.
3	"The Hunt"	Biyi Bandele & Kenneth Gyang	Zelipa Zulu	5 May 2022
Following Kola's body discovered in the shallow grave, Kemi and Sarah is now on the run as the police intensify their investigation into finding the killer of Kola. Kemi and Sarah tried to cross the border, but all efforts proved abortive as the Police and Uncle B(Ramsey Nouah), Mrs. Ademola's aide are on the lookout for them. Kemi and Sarah soon agreed that they are now fugitive and have to do anything to keep themselves out of the mess they have gotten into.
4	"The Catch"	Biyi Bandele & Kenneth Gyang	Zelipa Zulu	5 May 2022
At this point, some secrets about Kola became open, it was now revealed that Kola apparently is a 'woman-beater' as he has inflicted injuries and pains to women he has dated in the past. Sarah and Kemi are also in a very tight situation as tension builds up as they fight through a deadly situation that now lands them in the crosshairs of a family feud.

== Production ==
=== Casting ===
In season 2, Daniel Oriahi and Kayode Kasum served as directors, while new characters added were; B Junior played by Ben Touitou, Mimi played by Blessing Obasi-Nze, and Folake played by Michelle Dede.

== Release ==
Blood Sisters was set in Lagos and released on Netflix on 5 May 2022, with the official premiere being held on 4 May 2022. In attendance at the premiere, which featured many Nollywood actors, was Nigeria's Minister for Information and Culture, Lai Mohammed, who lauded the movie and described it as a big plus to the nation's creative industry. The theme of the premiere was "Red and Fugitive", and guests attending the event dressed in accordance with the theme. The second season was released globally on Netflix on June 5, 2026

== Reception ==
=== Season 1 (2022) ===
Blood Sisters received positive critical reviews. A reviewer for Variety described it as "An infectious mix of melodrama, dark humor, and social commentary, the show serves up an authentic depiction of Nigerian culture that's also telling a very universal story. You only need to glimpse the week's headlines to know that women's rights and domestic abuse are still endemic global issues." Twitter users praised the performances of Ini Dima-Okojie, Nancy Isime, Kate Henshaw, Ramsey Nouah, Tope Tedela and others and also praised the series for its plot and storyline.

=== Season two (2026) ===
Elijah Oluwanisola, writing for What Kept Me Up, praised the series "sustained juxtaposition between Kemi and Sarah's crisis and the apparent polished life of the Ademolas", however pointed out that the expansion of cast continues to the weak performances across the series. Emmanuel Muna of Premium Times gave the film an approval rating of 7 out of 10, sharing similarly the idea that "some subplots featuring newer characters distract from the central conflict, while several narrative developments raise questions the script never fully answers", but also praised the characters' general performance especially that of Uduak Ademola played by Kate Henshaw.
