= Chief Daddy =

2018 Nigerian comedy drama film

- Story by: Bode Asiyanbi
- Directed by: Niyi Akinmolayan
- Starring: Joke Silva; Funke Akindele; Dakore Akande; Ini Edo; Kate Henshaw; Rachael Oniga; Linda Ejiofor; Shafy Bello; Folarin Falana; Bisola Aiyeola; Zainab Balogun; Bose Lepacious
- Country of origin: Nigeria
- Original languages: English; Yoruba

Production
- Producer: Temidayo Abudu
- Cinematography: Muhammad Atta Ahmed
- Editor: Victoria Akujobi
- Running time: 99 minutes
- Production company: Ebonylife TV

Original release
- Network: Ebonylife TV
- Release: 14 December 2018

Chief Daddy is a 2018 Nigerian comedy drama film directed by Niyi Akinmolayan, written by Bode Asiyanbi and produced by Mosunmola Abudu and Temidayo Abudu. It was released in December 2018. The film stars Funke Akindele Bello, Kate Henshaw, Nkem Owoh, Joke Silva, Patience Ozokwor, Richard Mofe-Damijo and Racheal Oniga.

== Premise ==
Chief Daddy is about a billionaire industrialist, Chief Beecroft, who serves as a benefactor to a large extended family of relatives, household staff, and mistresses. He dies suddenly, and his will creates a saga among his extended family.

== Cast ==
- Bisola Aiyeola as Chef Simbi
- Dakore Egbuson-Akande as Remi Castle
- Funke Akindele as Tinu Beecroft
- Zainab Balogun as Ireti Beecroft
- Shaffy Bello as Nike Wiiliams
- Chioma Omeruah as Chuchu
- Ini Edo as Ekanem
- Ihuoma Linda Ejiofor-Suleiman as Justina
- Falz as Femi Beecroft
- Mawuli Gavor as Damilare Kofi Mensah
- Kate Henshaw as Teni Beecroft
- Lepacious Bose as Madam Tasty
- Richard Mofe-Damijo as Tega Castle
- M.I. Abaga as Mr. X
- Beverly Naya as Adaora
- Chinedu Ani as Joro D
- Taiwo Obileye as Chief Daddy
- Rachel Oniga as Aunty Ajoke
- Beverly Osu as Sandra Bello
- Nkem Owoh as Shoffa Donatus
- Patience Ozokwor as Madam Pat
- Joke Silva as Lady Kay Beecroft
- Demi Banwo as Mr. Barnabas
- Kayode Freeman as Dr. Bada
- Ayo Lijadu as Prelate Malachi
- Nicole Ofoegbu as Dame Esther
- Uti Nwachukwu as Dare Edwards
- Solomon Bryan as Kasali.

== Premiere and release ==
Chief Daddy was released in Nigeria on 14 December 2018 and in the Netherlands on 15 March 2019 via Netflix. The film premiered at the Oriental Hotel in Lagos, with over 40 Nollywood movie stars in attendance, including Olu Jacobs, Joke Silva, and Richard Mofe Damijo. It later grossed ₦387.5 million at the box office.

== Company credits and distributors ==
The film was produced by Ebony Life Films and distributed by Film One Entertainment in Nigeria and Netflix in the Netherlands.
