= Sharon Ooja =

Nigerian actress (born 1991)

Sharon Ooja Nwoke
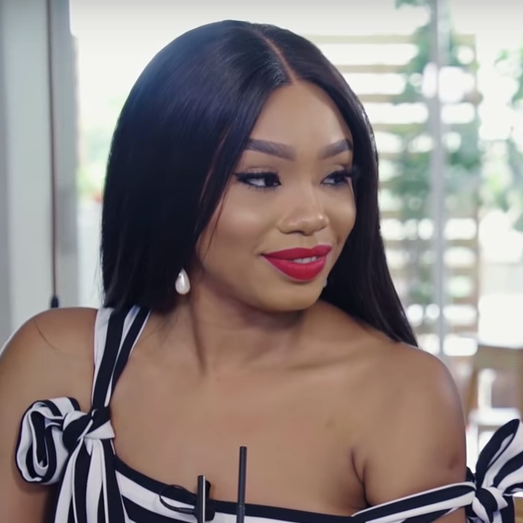
- Born: Sharon Ooja Egwurube; 6 April 1991 (age 35); Kaduna, Nigeria
- Occupation: Actress
- Known for: Skinny Girl in Transit

Sharon Ooja Nwoke (née Egwurube; born 6 April 1991), known professionally as Sharon Ooja, is a Nigerian actress. She came into the limelight after she played the role of "Shalewa" in the web series Skinny Girl in Transit.

== Early life and education ==
Ooja is from the Idoma tribe of Benue state. She was born in Kaduna State. She has three sisters. She attended Kings and Queens School, Jos, for her primary education. For her secondary education, she attended two all-girls schools – Regina Pacis Secondary School, Garki II, Abuja, and St. Louis Girls’ College, Jos. Both were boarding schools.

== Career ==
Ooja started her acting career when she moved to Lagos in 2013. She revealed in an interview with a Nigerian tabloid, Punch newspaper how she got into acting. According to Ooja, it all began when she was at a photo session for a store and NdaniTV was covering the behind-the-scenes activities of the shoot. The next week, she was invited for an interview for a television show that did not happen. Shortly afterwards, she was called to play in a small role in the television series, Gidi Up. Ooja also featured in Skinny Girl in Transit, where she played the character Shalewa.

Ooja is a graduate of mass communication from Houdegbe North American University Benin. She hosted GT Bank's Fashion week red carpet alongside Timini Egbuson in 2017.

She was listed as a top female celebrity of 2020 and a Nollywood actress to look forward to in 2024. Ooja was among many others selected by Netflix to represent Nigeria in the program organized titled "The Bridgeton Affair" in South Africa. She fell ill during the remake of the movie Glamour Girls.

== Personal life ==
Ooja and Ugo Nwoke dated for two and a half months before they married. The actress announced in March 2024 that she had a private civil wedding ceremony with her husband whom she calls "Odogwu silencer". Surrounded by family members, friends and colleagues, Ooja married Ugo Nwoke in June 2024. The traditional leg of the ceremony was held on 27 June 2024, while the white wedding was on 29 June 2024.

== Filmography ==
=== TV shows ===
| Year | Show | Role | Notes | Ref |
|---|---|---|---|---|
| 2013–2014 | Gidi Up | Jola | Web series | |
| 2016–present | Skinny Girl in Transit | Shalewa | Web series | |
| 2018–2020 | The Men's Club | Jasmine | 2 episodes | |
| 2020 | Assistant Madams | | Episode: "Men are Scum" | |
| 2022–present | Flawsome | Ivie | | |
| 2024 | Òlòtūré: The Journey | Ehi (Òlòtūré) | Limited series, title character | |

=== Movies ===
| Year | Movie | Role | Ref |
|---|---|---|---|
| 2024 | Hijack '93 | Ada | |
| 2024 | Dead Serious | Amara | |
| 2023 | The Modern Woman | | |
| 2022 | Glamour Girls | Emma | |
| 2022 | The Perfect Arrangement | Omotade Kaleijaye | |
| 2021 | Still Falling | Bono Kuku | |
| 2020 | Kambili: The Whole 30 Yards | Linda | |
| 2020 | Bad Comments | Tasha | |
| 2020 | Who's The Boss | Liah | |
| 2019 | Coming from Insanity | Sonia | |
| 2019 | Òlòtūré | Òlòtūré / Ehi | |
| 2019 | Bling Lagosians | Tokunbo | |
| 2018 | King of Boys | Amaka | |
| 2018 | Lara and the Beat | Ngozi | |
| 2018 | Moms at War | Asibi Elayo | |
| 2018 | From Lagos with Love | Kelechi Pedro | |

== Awards and nominations ==
| Year | Award | Category | Film | Result | Ref |
|---|---|---|---|---|---|
| 2019 | Best of Nollywood Awards | Revelation of the Year – female | —N/a | Nominated | |
| 2020 | Best of Nollywood Awards | Best Supporting Actress – English | Bling Lagosians | Nominated | |
| 2020 | Best of Nollywood Awards | Best Kiss in a Movie | Bling Lagosians | Nominated | |
| 2021 | Net Honours | Most Popular Actress | —N/a | Nominated | |
