= Jude Idada =

Nigerian filmmaker and poet

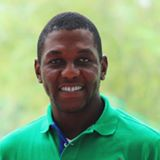
- Born: Lagos, Nigeria
- Occupation: Screenwriter actor director
- Years active: 1993–present

Jude Idada is a Nigerian actor, poet, playwright and producer best known for writing the feature film, The Tenant. He has also produced and written several other short films and books.

== Early life and education ==
Idada was born and raised in Lagos, Nigeria. He attended command children's school Bonny Camp in Victoria Island.

Idada was a pure science student in high school without any background in the arts. He initially applied to study medicine in the university but later, he changed his course of study to agricultural economics. After a couple of semesters in agriculture, Idada quit studying agricultural economics and stayed at home for nine months after which, he got admitted to the University of Ibadan to study theater arts where he had his first degree.

== Career ==
After graduation, Idada worked at Guardian Express Bank, a job he got while he was still a corps member after which he moved to Arthur Andersen. He immigrated to Canada, did a postgraduate and worked in banks, telecommunication firms and along that line. After seeing a short film with friends, he resigned his job to pursue writing and film production.

He was selected as one of the screenwriters for the Toronto International Film Festival's Adapt This! and the Afrinolly/Ford Foundation Cinema4Change projects. Idada was also an inaugural participant in the Relativity Media/AFRIFF Filmmaking project.

He is the Artistic director of the Africa Theatre Ensemble in Toronto, Canada. Idada has stage plays, collection of short stories, poetry to his credit. Stage plays: Flood, Brixton Stories, Lost and Coma, 3some. He has also written and published a collection of short stories: A Box of Chocolates, Exotica Celestica. Written and directed Stage plays: Oduduwa – King of the Edos, By My Own Hands and a children's book Didi Kanu and the Singing Dwarfs of the North.

As an acting coach, Idada teaches a wide variety of thespians, the rudiments and technicalities of acting for stage and for film. He has also guest lectured for the African Theatre Ensemble in Canada, the Mofilm/Unilever Sunlight Foundation Film Project in Nigeria, the AIDS foundation in Guyana. In addition, he has chaired several panels at International Film Festivals and writing for various magazines.

== Filmography ==
=== Film ===
- Kofa (Drama) - 2022 - Director/Producer
- Chameleon (Short Film) – 2016 – Writer/Director
- Blaze Up The Ghetto (Documentary) – 2010 – Director
- The Tenant (Feature Film) – 2005 – Writer/Producer
- Inside (Short Film) – 2000 – Director/Producer
- The Woman in my Closet – (Short Film) – 1999 – Director/Producer
- Young Wise Fools – (Short Film) – 1999 – Director/Producer

=== Stage plays ===
- 3some by Idada – 2018 – Director/Producer
- Coma by Idada – 2013 – Director
- Lost by Modupe Olaogun – 2013 – Director
- Brixton Stories by Biyi Bandele – 2012 – Director
- The Flood by Femi Osofisan – 2011 – Director
- In The Name of The Father – 2008 – Writer/Director
- The Seed of Life – 2008 – Writer/Director
- Love is the Word – 2007 – Writer/Director
- Your God is Dead – 2000 – Director/Writer/Producer
- Power of Love – 1999 – Director/Writer/Producer
- Snares of Lucifer – 1998 – Director/Writer/Producer

== Writing credits ==
=== Screenplays ===
- Simi (feature film) – 2016 – For Applegazer and Karmacause Productions, producer, Udoka Oyeka
- Tatu (Feature film) – 2016 – For Filmhouse Productions, producer, Don Omope
- The River (feature film) – 2015 – For Applegazer and Karmacause Productions, Producer Orode Uduaghan
- House Girls (TV Series) – 2015 – For Xandria Productions; Producers, Chineze Anyaene, Theophilus Ukpaa.
- Driving Mr Akin (feature film) – 2015 – For Xandra Productions, producer, Chineze Anyaene.
- Doctor Death (feature film) – 2014 – For Raconteur/Creoternity Productions, Producer Chioma Onyenwe
- The Road (Short film) – 2014 – For Afrinolly/Ford Foundation
- Justice (Short film) – 2014 – For Elvina Ibru Productions
- Sunshine (feature film) – 2013
- Coma (Feature Film) – 2012 – For I Take Media, Producers, Fabian Lojede, Mickey Dube
- Journeys of One (Feature Film) – 2011 – For Omcomm Communications, Producer; Soledad Grognett
- Lagos Connection (Feature Film) – 2011 – For 1 Take Media, Producer; Fabian Lojede
- Afreeka (Feature Film) – 2010
- The Drum (Feature Film) – 2010
- Sex in the Age of Innocence (Feature Film) – 2009
- No More An Uncle Tom (Feature Film) – 2009
- The Dilemma (Feature Film) – 2008
- Ghetto Red Hot (Feature Film) – 2007 – (Optioned)
- Mirage (Feature Film) – 2006
- Kite (Feature Film) – 2006 – for NTFG Productions, Producer Yifei Zhang
- The Tenant (Feature Film) – 2005 – released 2008 by Broken Manacles Entertainment
- Somewhere in Between (Feature Film) – 2005 (Optioned)
- Faces of a Coin (Feature Film) – 2004 (Optioned)
- Inside – (Short Film) – 2000
- The Woman in my Closet – (Short Film) – 1999
- Young Wise Fools – (Short Film) – 1999
- Two Faces of a Coin (Short Film) – 1998

=== Stage plays ===
- Sankara – 2016 – Commissioned by G.R.I.P media
- MKO – 2016 – Commissioned by the MKO Abiola family
- 3some – 2016 – Optioned by Make It Happen Productions
- The March – 2016 – Optioned by Theatre Magnifica
- Resurrection – 2014 – Optioned by Oracles Repertory Theatre
- The Calling – 2013 – Commissioned by African Theatre Ensemble
- Coma – 2012 – Optioned by Oracles Repertory Theatre
- In The Name of The Father – 2008 – Performed by the Visionaries
- The Seed of Life – 2008 – Performed by the Visionaries
- Love is the Word – 2007 – Performed by the Visionaries
- Vendetta – 2006 – Optioned by the Africa Theatre Ensemble
- Oduduwa "King of the Edos" – 2005 – Performed by the Oracle Repertory Theatre

Published by Createspace/Creoternity Books

- Power of Love – 1994 – Performed by Neighbours International
- Your God is Dead – 1994 – Performed by Neighbours International
- Snares of Lucifer – 1993 – Performed by Neighbours International

=== Novels ===
- More than Comedy (A Biography of Efosa ‘Efex’ Iyamu) – 2015
- Didi Kanu and the Singing Dwarfs of the North – 2015- Createspace/Creoternity Books
- By My Own Hands – 2014 – Createspace/Creoternity Books
- A Box of Chocolates – 2005 – Trafford Publishing (Collection of Short Stories)
- Boom Boom – 2019 – Winepress Publishing

=== Poetry ===
- Exotica Celestica – 2012 – Createspace/Creoternity Books
- Meditations of a Traveling Mind – 2004
- Oh My Lord! – 1992

=== Songs ===
- Firefly – 2016 – Chibie; Producer: Brian Quaye, Chibie Okoye
- Life is Sweet– 2013 – Chibie; Producer: Jeff McCulloch
- Speed Demon – 2013– Chibie; Producer: Jeff McCulloch
- Revolution – 2013 – Chibie; Producer: Soji Oyinsan
- I No Be Tenant – 2010 – Blacko Blaze ft Chibie; Producer: Blacko Blaze, Released by Broken Manacles Entertainment

== Acting credits ==
- 8 Bars and A Clef (Feature Film) – Dir Chioma Onyenwe – 2014
- The Tenant (Feature Film) – Dir Lucky Ejim – 2006
- Death and the Kings Horseman (Stage Play) – Dir Ronald Wiehs – 2004
- The Prize (Stage Play) – Dir Lekan Fagbade – 2000
- Inside (Short Film) – Dir Idada – 2000
- Ezenwanyi (Stage Play) – Dir Chetachukwu Udo – Ukpai – 1999
- The Woman in my Closet (Short Film) – Dir Idada – 1999
- Young Wise Fools (Short Film) – Dir Idada – 1999
- Doom (Stage Play) – Dir Yacoub Adeleke – 1997
- Grip Am (Stage Play) – Dir Dare Fasasi – 1997
- Hopes of the Living Dead (Stage Play) – Dir Lekan Fagbade – 1998
- Queen Idia (Stage Play) – Dir Israel Eboh −1998
- Human Zoo (Stage Play) – Dir Dare Fasasi – 1997
- Snares of Lucifer (Stage Play) – Dir Idada, Ifeanyi Agu – 1993, 1997
- Your God is Dead (Stage Play) – Dir Idada – 1994
- Power of Love (Stage Play)- Dir Idada – 1994, 1999
- Eku (Stage Play) – Dir Wale Macaulay – 1995
- Atakiti (Stage Play) – Dir Esikinni Olusanyin – 1995

== Awards and recognition ==
Year	Award	Category	Work	Result
2019	Nigeria Prize for Literature	Children Novel	Boom Boom	Won
2014	Nigeria Prize for Literature	Use Of Literature	Oduduwa, King of the Edos (Stage play)	Nominated
2013	Association of Nigerian Authors Award	Best Drama	Oduduwa, King of the Edos	Won
2010	6th Africa Movie Academy Awards	Best Picture	The Tenant	Nominated
2010	6th Africa Movie Academy Awards	Best Screenplay	The Tenant	Won
2010	6th Africa Movie Academy Awards	Best Director	The Tenant	Nominated
