= Òlòtūré =

2019 Nigerian crime drama film

- Directed by: Kenneth Gyang
- Screenplay by: Yinka Ogun; Craig Freimond
- Story by: Mo Abudu; Heidi Uys
- Produced by: Heidi Uys; Temidayo Abudu; James Amuta
- Starring: Beverly Osu; Sharon Ooja; Omowumi Dada
- Cinematography: Malcolm Mclean
- Edited by: Victoria Akujobi; Johnson Awolola
- Music by: Kulanen Ikyo
- Production company: EbonyLife Films
- Distributed by: Netflix
- Release dates: 31 October 2019 (Tunisia); 2 October 2020 (Netflix)
- Running time: 106 minutes
- Country: Nigeria
- Languages: English; Pidgin

Òlòtūré is a 2019 Nigerian crime drama film directed by Kenneth Gyang from a screenplay by Yinka Ogun and Craig Freimond. It stars Sharon Ooja, Beverly Osu, Ada Ameh and Blossom Chukwujekwu.

== Premise ==
Òlòturé, a young and naive Nigerian journalist goes undercover to expose the dangerous and brutal underworld of human trafficking. Based in Lagos, it depicts how sex workers are recruited to be exploited overseas.

== Cast ==
- Sharon Ooja as Òlòturé
- Beverly Osu as Peju
- Ada Ameh as Titi
- Omowumi Dada as Linda
- Blossom Chukwujekwu as Emeka
- Omoni Oboli as Alero
- Segun Arinze as Theo
- Adebukola Oladipupo as Beauty
- Ikechukwu Onunaku as Chuks
- Kemi Lala Akindoju as Blessing
- Omawumi as Sandra
- Sambasa Nzeribe as Victor
- Daniel Etim Effiong as Tony
- David Jones David as Sheriff
- Emmanuel Ilemobajo as Simon
- Eunice Omoregie as Linda's mother
- Greg "Teddy Bear" Ojefua as Sami
- Patrick Doyle as Sir Phillip
- Pearl Okorie as Peace
- Wofai Fada as Vanessa
- Yemi Solade as Jubril

== Production ==
The script for Òlòturé is partly based on reporting by Nigerian investigative journalist Tobore Ovuorie. Filming officially began on 5 November 2018 at a location in Lagos, Nigeria.

== Release ==
The film premiered on 31 October 2019 at Carthage Film Festival in Tunisia. In September 2020, Netflix acquired distribution rights to the film, and it began streaming on 2 October 2020. Within days of its release, Òlòturé ranked among the Top 10 most-watched movies worldwide on Netflix.

== Sequel ==
On 4 June 2024, Netflix released the official trailer for the sequel, Òlòtūré: The Journey on YouTube. Produced by Ebonylife Studios, the film was released globally on 28 June 2024.

== See also ==
- List of Nigerian films of 2019
