= Beverly Naya =

British-born Nigerian actress (born 1989)

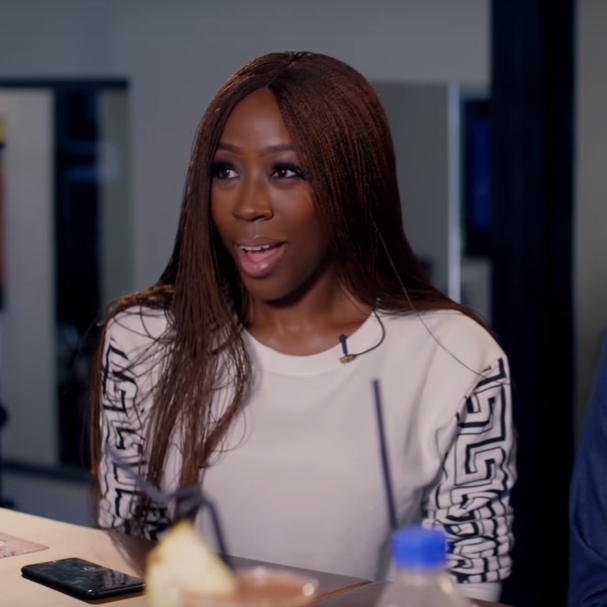
- Naya on NdaniTV in 2018
- Born: Beverly Naya; London, England
- Education: Roehampton University
- Occupation: Actress
- Years active: 2008–present

Beverly Naya (born Beverly Ifuanya; 17 April) is a British-born Nigerian actress. She won Most Promising Talent at the 2010 Best of Nollywood Awards. She also won the award for Fast Rising Actress at the 2011 City People Entertainment Awards.

== Early life ==
Naya was born in London as the only child of her Nigerian parents. At 17, Naya began acting while studying philosophy, psychology and sociology at Brunel University. She also studied script-writing and film-making at Roehampton University. In an interview with BellaNaija, she explained that she relocated to Nigeria because of the rapid growth of Nollywood, and the opportunities that it creates for aspiring actors. In another interview, Naya cited Ramsey Nouah and Genevieve Nnaji as mentors.

== Career ==
Naya began acting at the age of 17 and studied film-making at Roehampton University, London. In the year 2011, Naya was named the "fastest rising actress" in the City People Entertainment Awards in Nigeria, when asked why she returned to Nigeria by Encomium Magazine she said:

After I graduated from university, I just knew that I wanted to act, I knew I wanted to act, and in London I could shoot a film probably once in a year and that's it. Whereas coming to this industry, I can build a brand as well as shoot films more often and be given a more diverse amount of scripts. So, I decided to come back for that reason.

== Filmography ==
Year	Title	Role
2012	Guilty Pleasures	Bella
2012	Death Waters	
	Tinsel	
	Home in Exile	
2013	Alan Poza	Pride Eze
2013	Forgetting June	Tobi
2014	Make a move	
	Up Creek Without a Paddle	
2013	Stripped	Soledad
2012	Weekend Getaway	Angela
2014	...When Love Happens	Jennifer
2014	Brother's Keeper	Cassandra Okoro
2015	Before 30	Nkem
2015	Oasis	
2015	Skinny Girl in Transit	
2016	Suru L'ere Omosigho	
2016	The Wedding Party	Rosie
	Dinner	
2016	Affairs of the Heart	Stella
2016	The Arbitration	Chiamaka Sanni
	Dibia	
2017	The Wedding Party 2	Rosie
2018	Chief Daddy	Adaora
2018	The Eve	Yewande
2018	In Sickness and Health	Tinuke
2019	Jumbled	Jasmin
2020	Nneka the Pretty Serpent	Nkem Ojukwu
2021	Two Weeks in Lagos	
2022	Chief Daddy 2: Going for Broke	Adaora
2022	Kofa	Franka
2023	The Fast Lane	Shakira
2024	Insecure	
2025	After 30	

== Awards and nominations ==
Year	Event	Prize	Work	Result
2010	2010 Best of Nollywood Awards	Most Promising Talent		Won
2011	City People Entertainment Awards	Fast Rising Actress		Won
2014	ELOY Awards	TV Actress of the Year	Tinsel	Nominated
2016	AMVCA	Best Supporting Actress		Nominated
2018	Toronto International Film Festival	Best Actress	Demon Inside	Won
2018	Forbes 30 under 30 Africa	Best Actress and Entrepreneur		Won
2020	Africa Magic Viewers' Choice Awards (AMVCA)	Best Documentary	Skin	Won
