= Encomium Magazine =

Nigerian magazine

- Categories: Celebrity
- Frequency: Weekly
- Publisher: Encomium Ventures Limited
- Founded: 1997
- Country: Nigeria
- Based in: Lagos
- Language: English
- Website: Encomium Magazine

Encomium Magazine is a Nigerian magazine published by Encomium Ventures Limited. The magazine has started publishing since 1997. Its head office is located in Ikeja, Lagos.

Encomium Magazine is among the top selling soft sell magazine in Nigeria. Its coverage includes celebrity gossip, health, style and wellbeing.
