= Ebonylife TV =

Nigerian media production company

- Industry: Entertainment
- Founded: 2013
- Founders: Mo Abudu
- Headquarters: Lagos, Nigeria
- Key people: Mo Abudu
- Products: television programs, Netflix series

Ebonylife TV is an entertainment TV channel owned by Mosunmola Abudu popularly called Mo Abudu, It was launched on DSTV in July 2013 after which the station was later added to DSTV in September 2014. After partnering and satisfying the executive arrangement Ebonylife TV had with DSTV for over five years, Ebonylife TV ended its arrangement with DSTV and proceeded in August 2018 to start broadcasting on StarTimes network, the partnership with startimes was to foster and improve homegrown content to viewers and subscribers in Africa and to also allow Nigerians and viewers generally enjoy the service at a more affordable rate.

== Works and achievements ==
In 2021, Ebonylife TV announced the launch of Ebonylife Creative Academy, which is aimed at improving the quality of local film production, with a partnership with the Lagos State Government, Ebonylife creative academy provides short and professional courses on film making, media content and other related courses. Ebonylife TV and media became the first African media house to sign a deal with Netflix and this has made Netflix get the right to the new movies produced by Ebonylife TV such as Castle and Castle amongst others.

In March 2018, Sony Pictures Television (SPT) announced that they had concluded a three-year deal with EbonyLife TV that would include co-production of The Dahomey Warriors, a series about the Amazons who took on French colonialists in a 19th-century West African kingdom. In January 2020, AMC Networks (USA) announced its partnership with EbonyLife to produce Nigeria 2099, an afrofuturistic crime-drama created by EbonyLife. In February 2020, a new partnership between EbonyLife TV and Netflix was announced.

The streaming giant acquired EbonyLife's drama series: Castle & Castle, Fifty, Sons of the Caliphate, 'On the Real, along with a reality show, The Dating Game and feature film, The Royal Hibiscus Hotel. Ebonylife TV added to their achievements by securing rights together with Will Packer Productions and Universal Pictures to produce a movie on Hushpuppi, who was arrested recently for fraudulent activities. On November 29, 2021, it is announced that subsidiary EbonyLife Media had received a development deal with BBC Studios.

== Ebonylife films ==
Ebonylife films has produced a couple of notable and well-grossing films and TV series in Nigeria. The films produced by Ebonylife has appeared to do very well, as they have always grossed very well. Ebonylife's debut film, Fifty in 2015 was Nigeria's highest-grossing film in 2015 and 2016. The Wedding Party, another of Ebonylife Film projects, became the highest-grossing title of all time in the Nigerian film industry (Nollywood) in 2018.

=== Film ===
- Fifty
- The Wedding Party
- The Wedding Party 2
- The Royal Hibiscus Hotel
- Chief Daddy
- Chief Daddy 2: Going for Broke
- Your Excellency
- Oloture
- Elesin Oba, The King's Horseman

=== Selected television ===
- Castle and Castle
- The Governor
- Powder Dry
- Fifty the Series
- Sons of the Caliphate
- Blood Sisters (2022 series)
- Òlòtūré: The Journey
