= Patrick Doyle (Nigerian actor) =

Nigerian actor (born 1961)

- Born: Patrick Rupherford Doyle; 23 March 1961 (age 65); Lagos, Nigeria
- Occupations: Nollywood actor and broadcaster
- Years active: 1981–present
- Spouse: Iretiola Doyle

Patrick Rupherford Doyle (born 23 March 1961) is a Nigerian veteran actor and broadcaster who was popular in the 1990s for his roles as a pastor or a religious leader. Doyle, originally from Delta State, attended Saint Finbarr's College, Akoka, and Federal Radio Cooperation Nigeria. He went into broadcasting at the age of 20, where he worked with the Voice of Nigeria (VON) and Nigeria Television Authority before he then became a consultant at Silverbird TV.

Doyle was married to veteran actress Iretiola Doyle with 5 kids after he lost his first wife to sickle cell anemia in 1999 and his son Raymond in 2009. They confirmed their divorce in 2023.

== Selected filmography ==
=== Films ===
- After 30 (2025)
- Something Like Gold (2023) as Jolayemi Scott
- The Black Book (2023) as Senator Dipo
- Man of God (2022) as Bishop Asuquo
- Lady Buckit and the Motley Mopsters (2020) as Bozimo
- Isoken (2017) as Papa Isoken
- Idahosa Trails (2017)
- The Widow (2015)
- Flower Girl (2013) as Mr. Williams

=== Television ===
- Ripples
- Castle & Castle (2018) as Otunba
- King of Boys: The Return of the King

=== Music videos ===
- Love Medicine – Lorrine Okotie (1990)
