= Your Excellency (film) =

2019 Nigerian film

- Directed by: Funke Akindele
- Starring: Funke Akindele; Akin Lewis; Shaffy Bello; Deyemi Okanlawon; Toni Tones; Alex Ekubo
- Music by: Tolu Obanro
- Production company: EbonyLife TV
- Distributed by: FilmOne Distributions
- Release date: 13 December 2019
- Running time: 120 minutes
- Country: Nigeria
- Language: English
- Box office: ₦186.3 million

Your Excellency is a 2019 Nigerian political satire drama comedy film written and directed by Funke Akindele on her directorial debut. The film stars Akin Lewis and Funke Akindele in the lead roles. The film had its theatrical release across 50 theatres on 13 December 2019 and opened to positive reviews from critics. The film was a box office success and the fourth highest-grossing Nigerian film of 2019.

== Plot ==
A bumbling billionaire businessman and failed presidential candidate, Chief Olalekan Ajadi, is very much obsessed with US President Donald Trump. Just when his political campaign seems to be on the verge of another floppy disaster, Ajadi is anointed by a majority party and becomes a tough, credible contender with the assistance of the powerful social media.

== Cast ==
- Akin Lewis as Chief Olalekan Ajadi
- Funke Akindele as Kemi Ajadi
- Kemi Lala Akindoju as Lina
- Shafy Bello as Laide Ajadi
- Kunle Coker as Mallam Ali
- Eku Edewor as Eki Adua-Evans
- Alex Ekubo as Kachi
- Osas Ighodaro as Candy
- Oreka Godis as Karen
- Ini Dima-Okojie As Mimi
- Helen Paul as Freda
- Falz as AK Famzy
- Deyemi Okanlawon as Michael Idehen
- Toni Tones as Stephanie
- Emmanuel 'EmmaOMG' Edunjobi as Pastor Leke
- Aletile 'Seyi Law' Lawrence as Fred
- Bimbo Manuel As Prof Idehen
- Chigul as Madam Echejile
- Ikechukwu Onunaku as John

== Box office ==
The film grossed ₦17.5 million in its first two days and was the fourth highest-grossing Nollywood film of 2019, with ₦105.5 million.
