= Mo Abudu =

Nigerian talk show host and actress (born 1964)

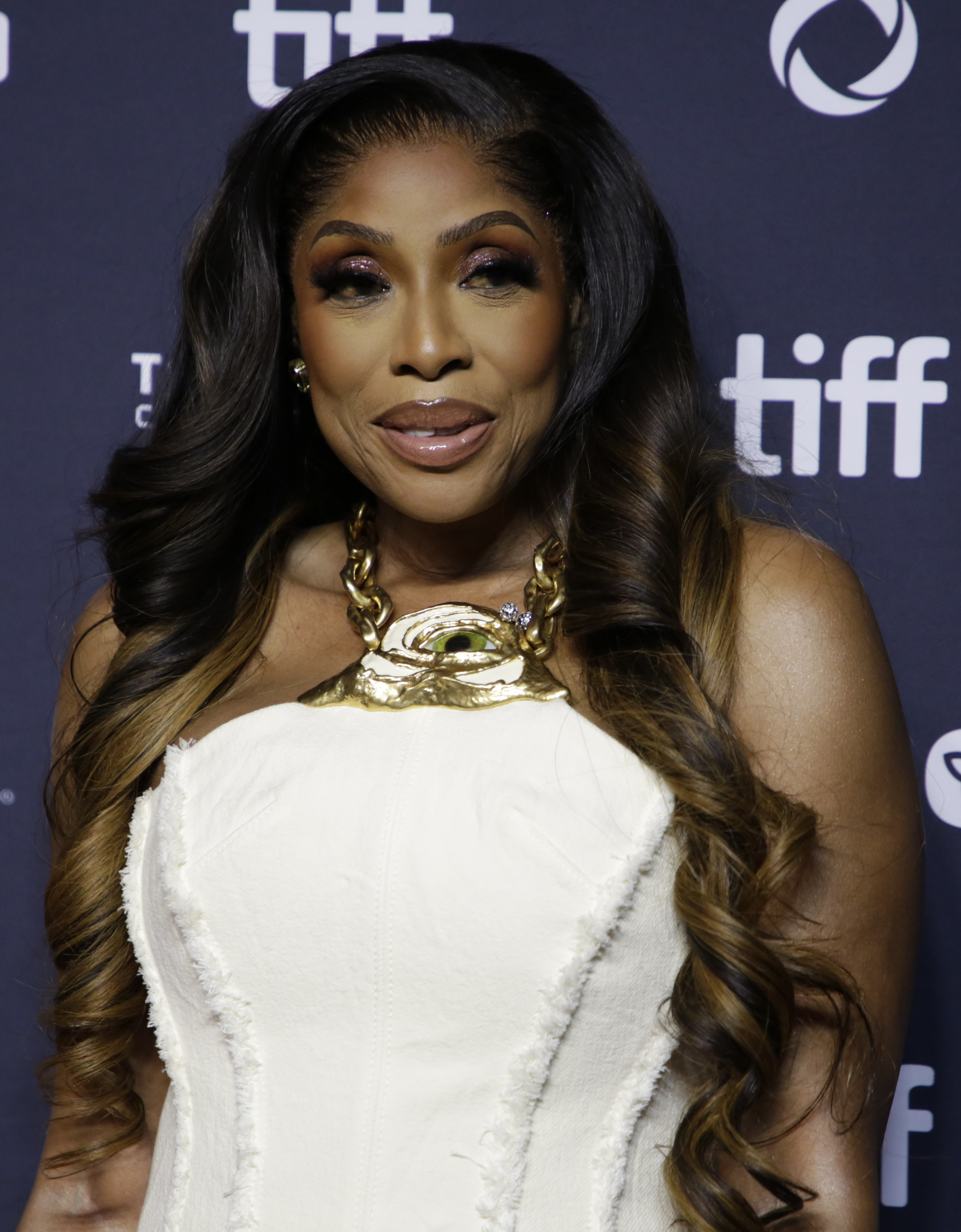
- Abudu in 2025 at TIFF.
- Born: Mosunmola Abudu; 11 September 1964 (age 62); London, United Kingdom
- Education: Ridgeway School; MidKent College; West Kent College; University of Westminster
- Occupation: Media proprietor
- Known for: Owner of Ebonylife TV
- Spouse: Tokunbo Abudu (divorced)
- Children: 2
- Website: ebonylifetv.com

Mosunmola "Mo" Abudu (born 11 September 1964) is a Nigerian media mogul, philanthropist, and former human resources management consultant.

== Biography ==
=== Early life ===
Mo Abudu was born in Hammersmith, West London. Her father was an engineer and her mother was a caterer. She is of Yoruba ethnicity. Her family roots are in Ondo Town, southwest Nigeria. She is the eldest of three sisters in the family. Abudu moved to Nigeria when she was seven years old to live with her grandparents, and returned to England at the age of 11.

=== Education ===
She attended the Ridgeway School, MidKent College, and West Kent College. She has a master's degree in Human Resource Management from the University of Westminster in London. Abudu is currently a member of the British Psychological Society, with qualifications in occupational and personality testing. In 2014, she received an honorary Doctor of Humane Letters (honoris causa) from Babcock University. The University of Westminster gave her an honorary Doctor of Arts degree in 2018 in recognition of her contributions to the broadcasting industry in Nigeria.

== Career ==
At the age of 19, Abudu was selected to be the brand ambassador for Avon Cosmetics for the African market.

She is the former head of Human Resources and Training for ExxonMobil. She is the founder of Vic Lawrence & Associates Limited. She also conceived the Protea Hotel, Oakwood Park. She went on to create, produce and present Moments with Mo, and later founded EbonyLife Television, a lifestyle network.

== EbonyLife ==
Abudu started Ebonylife TV (ELTV) in 2013, a network airing in many African countries, the UK and the Caribbean. It transmitted its first broadcast on 1 July 2013 on Multichoice's DSTV Channel 165. Ebonylife TV later launched a multi-screen video-on-demand (VOD) platform. It had a carriage deal with another pay-TV operator, StarTimes. Abudu is in charge of EbonyLife Media, which includes EbonyLife Films and EbonyLife Studios. She also oversees the EbonyLife Creative Academy, a school focused on teaching filmmaking skills, and EbonyLife Place, a luxury entertainment resort in Nigeria.

Abudu established EbonyLife Films in 2014. Her first film as an executive producer was Fifty (2015), directed by Biyi Bandele. She was a co-producer of The Wedding Party (2016). Other films she has executive-produced or co-produced are The Wedding Party 2, The Royal Hibiscus Hotel, Chief Daddy, Your Excellency and Òlòtūré. She also produced the series Blood Sisters; it made the top-ten list globally on Netflix, accumulating more than 11 million viewing hours. In March 2018, EbonyLife Media and Sony Pictures Television co-produced The Dahomey Warriors. In January 2020, AMC Networks announced its partnership with EbonyLife to produce Nigeria 2099, an afrofuturistic crime-drama created by EbonyLife.

Other collaborations with international studios include Sony, Netflix, Starz and Lionsgate, BBC, Will and Jada Smith's Westbrook Studios, and Will Packer Productions.

Abudu's project Elesin Oba, The King's Horseman – the screen adaptation of Wole Soyinka's stage play Death and the King's Horseman, directed by Biyi Bandele – premiered in the Special Presentations category at the 2022 Toronto International Film Festival.

=== Partnerships ===
In February 2020, a new partnership between EbonyLife Media and Netflix was announced. Netflix acquired EbonyLife's drama series: Castle & Castle, Fifty, Sons of the Caliphate, On the Real and The Governor, along with a reality show, The Dating Game, and the feature film The Royal Hibiscus Hotel. Netflix signed a new deal with EbonyLife on 12 June 2020. According to the deal, Abudu will work with the teams at Netflix to create two original series and multiple Netflix-branded films. A film adaptation of Death and the King's Horseman and a series based on Lola Shoneyin's debut, The Secret Lives of Baba Segi's Wives, were announced. In September 2020, Netflix launched a movie titled Òlòtūré.

On 4 February 2021, she signed a partnership with Sony in 2018. On 17 February 2021, it was announced that EbonyLife had partnered with Will Smith and Jada Pinkett Smith's Westbrook Studios to produce a slate of film and television projects.

EbonyLife Place, a lifestyle and entertainment resort, was launched by Abudu in December 2019.

In 2021, the Lagos State Ministry of Tourism, Arts & Culture hosted EkoDesign, a furniture design and lighting exhibition. Abudu's EbonyLife Media established a partnership with Sony to set up "Alo" translated into "Once Upon A Time". On 29 November 2021, it was announced that BBC Studios had signed a deal with EbonyLife Media for a development deal. She collaborated with Idris Elba's Green Door Pictures to develop film projects.

In 2021, the Harvard Business School featured a case study on the organization. Abudu has delivered speeches at the Wharton School of Business, Cambridge University Judge School of Business, Oxford University and Harvard University.

== Reception ==
Abudu was No. 98 on the Forbes list of the World's 100 Most Powerful Women for 2021, 2022 and 2023. She has been described by Forbes as "Africa's Most Successful Woman", and was rated as one of the "25 Most Powerful Women in Global Television" by The Hollywood Reporter. In October 2021, The Hollywood Reporter named her among the 20 most powerful women in global entertainment. In May 2025, she was named as one of the most influential women in international film by The Hollywood Reporter.

== Filmography ==
- The Secret Lives of Baba Segi's Wives (TV series)
- Untitled Billionaire Gucci Master Project
- Blood Sisters (TV miniseries, 2022)
- Chief Daddy 2: Going for Broke (2022)
- Òlòtūré (2019)
- Chief Daddy (2018)
- Castle & Castle (TV series 2018)
- The Wedding Party 2: Destination Dubai (2017)
- The Royal Hibiscus Hotel (2017)
- Fifty (TV series, 2017)
- Sons of the Caliphate (TV series)
- The Wedding Party (2016)
- On the Real (TV series, 2016)
- The Governor (TV series)
- Fifty (2015)
- Desperate Housewives Africa (TV series, 2015)
- Dowry (TV series, 2014)
- Married to the Game (TV series, 2014)
- Deadline (TV series, 2014)
- Love and War (TV movie, 2013)
- Baby Farm (2025)

== Moments with Mo ==
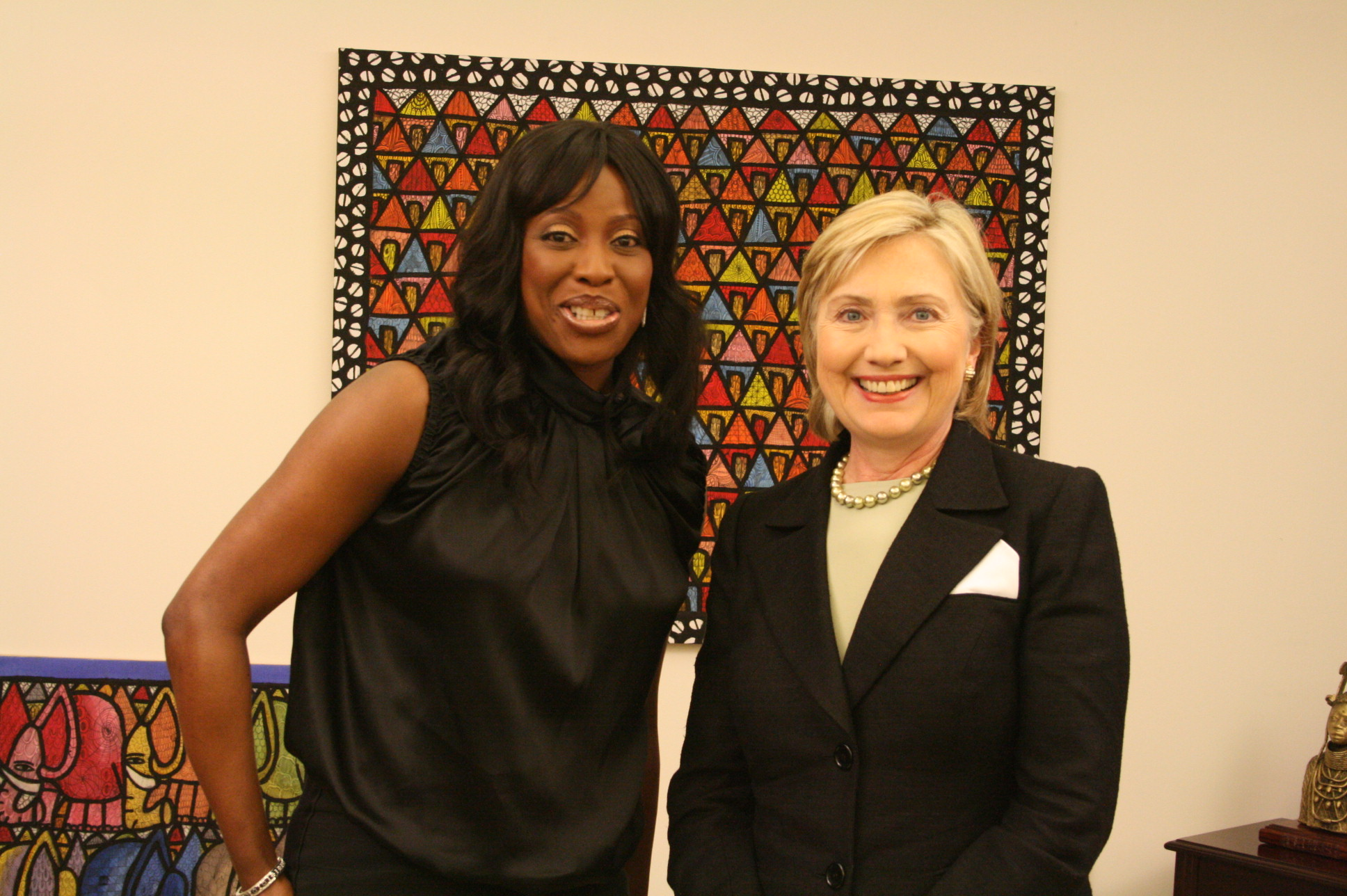
Abudu with US Secretary of State Hillary Clinton

Abudu is the executive producer and host of the TV talk show Moments with Mo, the first syndicated daily talk show on African regional television.

By October 2009, more than 200 episodes had been recorded and aired, with topics includinglifestyle, through health, culture, politics, entertainment, tradition, music and inter-racial marriages. Guests have included celebrities, presidents, Nobel laureates, and the 67th US Secretary of State, Hillary Clinton. Abudu says that the show "highlights the life and accomplishments of a usually well known, but sometimes an undiscovered African individual who by his or her own tenacity and determination has accomplished something, overcome something or been a catalyst for something that makes her or him a role model to others."

Aired on M-Net with TV coverage in 48 African countries, the show now also airs on terrestrial and cable TV in other parts of the world.

The show's success and intention to change the world's perception of the African continent has led to comparisons to Oprah Winfrey, with The Independent and Slate Afrique calling Abudu "Africa's Oprah" and "Nigerian Winfrey", respectively.

== The Debaters ==
Abudu is the creator and executive producer of The Debaters, a reality television show. Funded by Guaranty Trust Bank, it launched on 3 October 2009. The show focuses on "giving Africa a voice" by promoting oratory.

== Honours ==
Forbes Africa recognised Abudu as the first African woman to own a Pan-Africa TV channel (2013). She was listed as one of the 25 Most Powerful Women in Global TV by The Hollywood Reporter in 2013 and received the Entrepreneur of the Year award by Women Werk in New York (2014).

Abudu was nominated to serve as a member of the Advisory Group on Technology and Creatively for Nigeria. Abudu was appointed a director of the International Academy of Television Arts and Sciences, the organization responsible for staging the International Emmy Award. The Academy later appointed her as Chair of the 47th International Emmy Awards Gala, held in New York on Monday 25 November 2019. She was the first African to land the role.

She was named on the Power List 2018, an annual list of the UK's top 100 most influential people of African and Caribbean heritage. Abudu was nominated to serve as a member of the Advisory Group on Technology and Creatively for Nigeria in 2018 as well.

In 2019, she was awarded the MIPTV's 2019 Médailles d'Honneur, in Cannes, France, making her the first African to be a recipient of the reputable award. Later that year, Abudu was named on the 2020 "Powerlist" of the top 100 most influential people in the UK of African/African-Caribbean descent. She is featured in the 493-page book Greatest Blacks Ever: Top 100 Blacks Who Changed the World for Peace. Progress. Prosperity. Pleasure, authored by Ambassador Elliston Rahming and published by Dog Ear Publishing.

Abudu is the recipient of honorary degrees from Babcock University, Nigeria, and the University of Westminster UK. She received the Médailles d'Honneur from MIPTV in 2019, and Series Mania Woman in Series Award 2022. Abudu received an invitation to become a member of the Academy of Motion Arts and Sciences (the Oscars) in the Producer category. In October 2022, Abudu was awarded a National Honour, Officer of the Order of the Niger (OON) by the president of the Federal Republic of Nigeria.

In August 2023, she was designated as the Creatives Champion for the forthcoming UK-African Investment Summit by the UK Government. She was announced an executive fellow of the Hutchins Center for African and African American Research, Harvard University.

In 2024, Abudu received the ELOY Iconic Recognition Award.

== Personal life ==
Abudu lives in Lagos. She has a son and a daughter, and was formerly married to Tokunbo Abudu.
