= Shaffy Bello =

Nigerian film actress and singer (born 1970)

- Born: 8 October 1970 (age 55); Nigeria
- Other name: Shaffy Bello-Akinrimisi
- Citizenship: Nigeria
- Occupations: Film actress; singer
- Years active: 1997–present
- Notable work: Chief Daddy
- Television: Battleground
- Children: 2

Shaffy Bello is a Nigerian film actress and singer. She first shot into the entertainment scene when she featured vocals in a 1997 hit song by Seyi Sodimu titled "Love Me Jeje".

== Career ==
Shaffy grew up in the United States where she completed her education. Her first major film was Eti Keta, a Yoruba film.

In 2012, she starred as Joanne Lawson in the TV series Tinsel and as Adesuwa in Taste of Love. Shaffy has since featured in several Yoruba and English language films and TV series including When Love Happens, Gbomo Gbomo Express, and Taste of Love.

== Selected filmography ==
- Eti Keta (2011) as Aunty
- The Score (2012)
- Tinsel
- When Love Happens (2014) as Anna
- Gbomo Gbomo Express (2015) as Alexis Osita-Park
- Taste of Love
- It's Her Day (2016) as Mrs. Hernandez
- Ovy's Voice (2017) as Mrs. G
- Hire a Man (2017) as Mrs. Lawson
- Light will Come (2017)
- Twisted Twins
- Three Thieves (2019) as Madam Boss
- The Therapist (2021) as Mrs. Bankole
- Two Weeks in Lagos (2019) as Mrs. Makinde
- Soft Work (2020) as Mrs. Ademuyiwa
- Unroyal (2020) as Queen of Okrika
- Mama Drama (2020) as Mama Adelena
- Chief Daddy (2018) as Nike Williams
- From Lagos with Love (2018) as Nkiru Pedro
- Iboju
- Elevator Baby (2019) as Mrs. Williams
- Fishbone (2020) as Mama T
- The Men's Club
- Your Excellency (2019) as Laide Ajadi
- Deep blue sea
- Nneka the Pretty Serpent (2020) as Dr. Fatima Awolowo
- Separated (2020) as Mabel
- Chief Daddy 2: Going for Broke (2022) as Nike Williams
- Crazy Grannies (2021) as Omodele
- Elesin Oba, The King's Horseman (2022) as Iyaloja
- A Romantic Comedy Featuring Lara and Tobi (2022) as Ms Uche
- Mothers and Daughters-In-Law (2019) as Mama Chris
- The Rise of Igbinogun (2021)
- Love Is War (2019 film) as Senator Akerele
- Lara and the Beat (2018) as Jide's Mom
- Obsession (2022 film) as Dr. Ann
- One Bad Turn (2022) as Tambourine
- Convenant (2022) TV series as Adaora
- The Men's Club (Nigerian web series)
- Excess Luggage (2017) as Mrs. Ekwenife
- Whose Meal Ticket (2017) as Mrs. Disu
- Moth To A Flame (2016) as Mrs. Clinton
- 40 Looks Good on You (2019)
- City of Bastards (2019)
- Desperate Housewives Africa
- Head Over Bills (2022) as Mrs. Ofili
- Different Strokes (2023) as Alex Cole's Mother
- The Bloom Boys (2023) as Mrs Akintola
- Orisa (2023) as Olori Olateju
- Split (2019) as Davina
- Voiceless Scream (2018) as Gran
- Wrong Number (2024)
- The Beads (2024) as Mrs. Williams
- The Waiter (2024) as Mrs. Okon Edet
- Last Straw (2024) as Miss Regina Lawson
- Big Love (2023)
- The Black Book (2023)
- Gingerrr (2025)

=== Television ===
- Battleground (2017–18) as Adaora Bhadmus
- Sibe (2023) as Madam
- Just Us Girls (2023) as Chief
- She Must Be Obeyed (2023) as Iya Shiyanbola
- The Party (2025)

== Awards and nominations ==
Year	Award ceremony	Prize	Result	Ref
2012	2012 Best of Nollywood Awards	Best Lead Actress in an English Movie	Nominated	

== Personal life ==
Bello has two children.

Shaffy was married to Mr. Akinrimisi from 1995 until 2020.

== See also ==
- List of Yoruba people
