= Eku Edewor =

British-Nigerian actress, television presenter and model (born 1986)

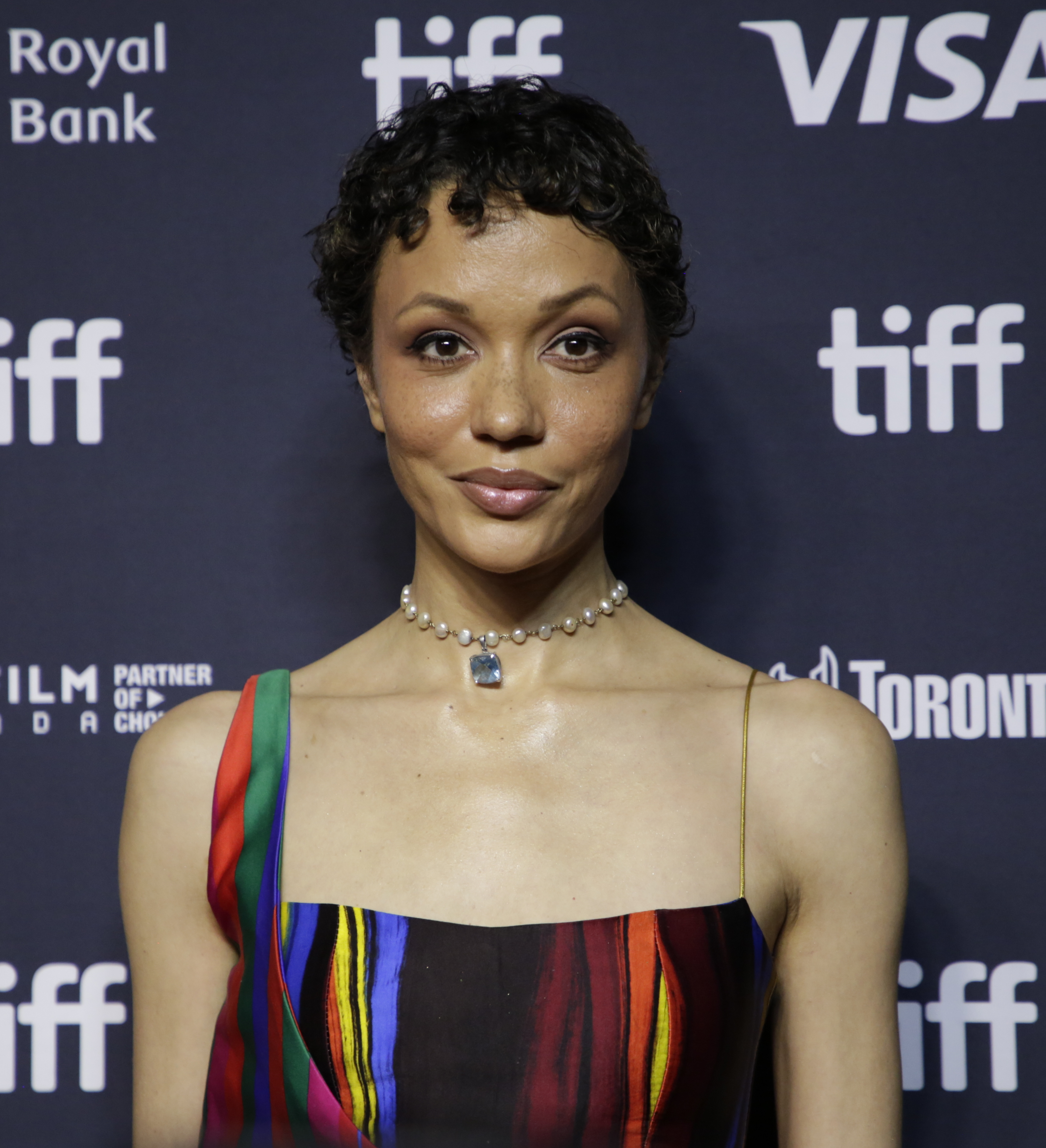
- Edewor in 2025 at TIFF.
- Born: Georgina Chloe Eku Edewor-Thorley; 18 December 1986 (age 39); Marylebone, London, United Kingdom
- Citizenship: Nigerian; British
- Education: Warwick University, New York Film Academy
- Occupations: Actress, television presenter, model
- Years active: 2007-present
- Children: 1
- Parent(s): Juliana Edewor (mother); Hugh Thorley (father)

Georgina Chloe Eku Edewor-Thorley (born 18 December 1986), known professionally as Eku Edewor, is a British Nigerian actress, television presenter, and model. She is best known for her work as host of the entertainment television program 53 Extra on Africa Magic.

== Early life and education ==
Edewor was born at Portland Hospital in Marylebone, London, along with her twin sister Kessiana. Her mother is Juliana Edewor, an interior designer, restaurateur, and art collector originally from Delta State. Her father, Hugh Thorley, is British and has worked in the food and beverage supply and logistics industries. Edewor's parents divorced when she was young and both remarried. Her late stepfather, Peter Thomas, was a businessman and lawyer from Lagos. On her maternal side, she is the granddaughter of the billionaire Chief James Edewor, a titled member of the Nigerian chieftaincy system. She's also a cousin of rugby star player Maro Itoje.

Edewor was raised in both Nigeria and the United Kingdom. She lived in Lagos until the age of 13, receiving her primary education at St. Saviour's School and Grange School. Eku then travelled back to the United Kingdom, where she attended boarding school at the Benenden School for Girls. She travelled often with her family, spending Christmases in Eku, her ancestral village in Delta State, and summers in America, Europe, and other African countries.

Edewor attended Warwick University in Coventry, England. She pursued a degree in English Literature and Theatre Studies, graduating with honours in 2008. She then successfully completed a three-month course in acting for film at the New York Film Academy in 2009.

== Career ==
Edewor's first television appearance was in 2006, when she competed in the reality show Britain’s Next Top Model under the name "Georgina Edewor-Thorley". She appeared in theatre productions while studying at Warwick University and the New York Film Academy. Her first job in the entertainment industry was as a production assistant to producer Damian Jones. She worked at his company DJ Films from September 2008 through October 2009. She appeared in the 2010 film Sex & Drugs & Rock & Roll as "Party Girl".

In 2010, after the loss of her stepfather, Edewor returned to Nigeria to work in her mother's restaurant, the Chardonnay Restaurant and Bar, so that her mother could focus on her career as an interior designer. Five months after she returned, she attended an open audition for co-presenter on 53 Extra (formerly Studio 53 Extra), an entertainment show produced by M-NET and airing on the DStv's Africa Magic channel. 53 Extra is a spin-off of Africa Magic's flagship magazine show Studio 53, which was named for the 53 countries in the African Union. 53 Extra features music, film, fashion, red carpet events, and news about celebrities and industry leaders from across the African continent.

Since landing her role on 53 Extra, Edewor has made several other television appearances; she co-hosted the Big Brother Africa All Stars live red carpet show in 2010, and she has also hosted the Pepsi Top Ten Countdown since 2012. She has appeared in commercials for M-NET's 25th Anniversary and also commercials for Martini. Edewor starred as Sade Coker in the television series The Island, which was shot in 2012 and is due to air in 2015 and played Nicole in the online series How She Left My Brother. For her first major film role, she played principal character Sapphire in the 2013 romantic comedy film Flower Girl. She most recently starred as Victoria in the 2014 film When Love Comes Around, produced by Zynnell Zuh.

She splits most of her time between London, Lagos, and New York City, but also travels a lot within Africa.

== Filmography ==
=== Film ===
Year	Title	Role	Notes
2010	Sex & Drugs & Rock & Roll	Party Girl	
2013	Flower Girl	Sapphire	Comedy / Romance
2014	When Love Comes Around	Victoria	
2016	Entreat	Ada	Directed by Michael Asuelime
2018	God Calling	Asa	Drama
2019	Your Excellency	Eki	Directed by Funke Akindele
2021	Superstar	Teni	Drama
2023	Breath of Life	Bridget	Drama
2023	A Sunday Affair	Mrs. Oyeyemi	Romance

=== Television ===
Year	Title	Role	Notes
2006	Britain’s Next Top Model	Herself (as Georgina Edewor-Thorley)	cycle 2, 7 episodes
2010–present	53 Extra	Host	
2010	Big Brother Africa Live Red Carpet Show	Co-host	
2011	M-Net's 25th Anniversary Commercial	Herself	
2012	Martini Commercial	Eku Edewor	4 episodes
2012–present	Pepsi Top Ten Music Countdown	Host	
2014	Channel O Africa Music Video Awards	Co-host	
2015	24/7	Bukola	
2015	The Island	Sade Coker	
2018–present	Castle & Castle	Nneka	15 episodes
2020-2024	The Smart Money Woman	Banke	4 episodes
TBA	The Cut	Host	
TBA	The Rules to Making Money	Herself	

=== Web ===
Year	Title	Role	Notes
2012	How She Left My Brother	Nicole	6 episodes

== Awards and nominations ==
Year	Event	Prize	Recipient	Result
2014	ELOY Awards	TV Presenter of the Year (Pepsi Top Ten Live Show, Africa Magic)	—N/a	Nominated
2014	Ghana Movie Awards	Best Actor, African Collaboration	—N/a	Won

== See also ==
- Black British elite, Edewor's class in Britain
