= List of Nigerian films of 2010 =

This is a list of Nigerian films released in 2010.

== Films ==
Title	Director	Cast	Genre	Notes	Ref
2010
Anchor Baby	Lonzo Nzekwe	Omoni Oboli Sam Sarpong Terri Oliver	Drama / thriller		
Aramotu	Niji Akanni	Idiat Sobande Kayode Odumosu Ireti Osayemi-Bakare Ayo Olabiyi Gabriel Afolayan Bisi Komolafe	Drama		
Between Kings and Queens	Joy Dickson	Jim Iyke Nakia Burrise DaJuan Johnson	Romance / Action		
Braids on a Bald Head	Ishaya Bako		Drama	Africa Movie Academy Award for Best Short Film	
Bursting Out	Desmond Elliot	Genevieve Nnaji Majid Michel Desmond Elliot Susan Peters Nse Ikpe Etim	Drama		
Good Girls Gone Bad 1-4	Nonso Emekaekwue	Oge Okoye Nonso Diobi Chika Ike Halimah Abubakar		Released on DVD	
Holding Hope	Desmond Elliot	Nadia Buari Uche Jombo Desmond Elliot	Drama		
Ijé, the Journey	Chineze Anyaene	Genevieve Nnaji Odalys García Omotola Jalade-Ekeinde Ulrich Que Jeff Swarthout	Drama	Released on Celluloid in USA and Nigeria by Xandria Productions.	
Inale	Jeta Amata	Caroline Chikezie; Hakeem Kae-Kazim; Nse Ikpe Etim; Ini Edo; Omawumi Megbele		Africa Movie Academy Award for Best Soundtrack	
Men in Love	John Dumelo	Tonto Dike Muna Obiekwe Halima Abubakar	Drama		
Relentless	Andy Amadi Okoroafor	Gideon Okeke; Nneka Egbuna; Jimmy Jean-Louis; Tope Oshin Ogun	Drama	It was released on 13 October 2010 at the BFI London Film Festival, and was positively received; mostly praised for its cinematography and soundtrack.	
Tango With Me	Mahmood Ali-Balogun	Genevieve Nnaji Joke Silva Joseph Benjamin	Drama		

== See also ==
- List of Nigerian films
