= 2010 Best of Nollywood Awards =

2nd Best of Nollywood Awards
- Date: 12 December 2010
- Site: Ijebu-Ode, Ogun, Nigeria
- Hosted by: Chioma Chukwuka-Akpotha and Deji Falope
- Organized by: Best of Nollywood Magazine

Winners are emboldened.

| Best Indigenous Actor in a lead role (yoruba) | Best Indigenous Actress in a lead role (yoruba) |
|---|---|
| Yomi Fash Lanso (OJ); Odun Kolade (Asepamo); Yinka Quadri (Ojo Idajo); Kelvin Ideduba (Ogun); Muka Ray (Oko Asetani) | Ronke Osodi Oke (Asiri); Kehinde Bankole (Imala); Funke Akindele (Ogun Aiku); Toyin Aimakhu (Awa Obinrin); Ayo Adesanya (Moyinoluwa) |
| Best Actor in a Leading role (English) | Best Actress in a Leading Role (English) |
| Majid Michel (Silent Scandals); Ramsey Nouah (The Figurine); John Dumelo (The Maiden); Emeka Ike (Yahoo Boys In Town); Desmond Elliot (Home In Exile) | Omoni Oboli (The Figurine); Ini Edo (White Hunters); Genevieve Nnaji (Silent Scandals); Rita Dominic (The Maiden); Nse Ikpe Etim (Guilty Pleasures) |
| Best Actor in a supporting role (yoruba) | Best Actress in a supporting Role (yoruba) |
| Muyiwa Ademola (Ogun Aiku); Eniola Olaniyan (Moyinoluwa); Chidex Broni (Imala); Pasuma (Asiri); Honey Bee Ikemefuma (Awa Obinrin) | Bimbo Thomas (Awa Obinrin); Eniola Badmus (Omo Ghetto); Iyabo Ojo (Mario); Taiwo Aromokun (Gongoso Lojo Idajo); Mercy Aigbe (Moyinoluwa) |
| Best Actor in a supporting role (English) | Best Actress in a supporting Role (English) |
| Bishop (Nollywood Hustlers); Joseph Benjamin (Jungle Fever); Olu Jacobs (Waterfalls); Francis Duru (Home In Exile); Yemi Blaq (High Blood Pressure) | Uche Jombo (Silent Scandals); Mercy Johnson – (The Maiden); Halima Abubakar (White Hunters); Bhaire Marizu (Waterfalls) |
| Director of the Year | Most Promising Talent |
| Kunle Afolayan (Figurine); Andy Amanechi (Imala); Daniel Ademinola (Asiri); Lancelot Oduwa Imasuen (Home In Exile); Iyke Odife (The Maidens) | Beverly Naya; Chelsea Eze; Oyin Odesola; Ivie Olvjela |
| Movie Reporter of the Year | Anapuna Salt Child Actor of the Year |
| Victor Akande – (The Nation); Biodun Kupoluyi (E24/7); Lolade Somoolu (Vanguard); Gbenga Bada (Daily Independent) | Tobe Oboli (The Figurine); Alao (Awa Obinrin) |
| Best Costume of the Year | Cinematography of the Year |
| The Maiden; Figurine; Asiri; Guilty Pleasure | Asiri; Figurine; Silent Scandals; The Maiden; Home In Exile |
| Comedy Movie of the Year | Best Comedy TV programme |
| Nollywood Hustlers; Babajayejaye; Gongoso Lojo Idajo; Alakada | AY Show; Laffmattazz; Akin Akindele Half Hour |
| TV Personality of the Year | Radio Personality of the year |
| Teju Babyface; Frank Edoho; Joseph Benjamin; Mo Abudu | Toolz (Beat Fm); Shola Thompson (Inspiration Fm); Matse Uwatse (Wazobia Fm); Yaw (Wazobia Fm) |
| Revelation of the Year (male) | Revelation of the year (female) |
| Bolanle Ninalowo (Rebirth); Bidemi Alaran (Imala); Gabriel Afolayan (Aiyekaye) | Chelsea Eze (Silent Scandals); Taiwo Aromokun (Gongoso Lojo Idajo 2); Funke Adesiyan (Ayo Ku Leyin); Peju Ashaye (Moyinoluwa); Beverly Naya (Home In Exile) |
| TV Programme of the Year | Movie of the Year |
| Teju Babyface Show; Who wants to be a millionaire?; Moments with Mo | Figurine; Guilty Pleasures; Asepamo mi; Omo Ghetto; Silent Scandals |
| Marketer of the Year | Best Sound of the Year |
| Corporate Pictures; Royal Arts Academy; Epsalum Pictures; Nollywood Distribution Ltd | Figurine; Kajola; High Blood Pressure; Asiri; Silent Scandals |
