= Jamani Tommy Ejiro =

Nigerian politician (born 1985)

Commissioner for Environment, Delta State
- Incumbent
- Assumed office 22 August 2023
- Governor: Sheriff Oborevwori

Personal details
- Born: Okuo-Ozue, Sapele Local Government Area, Delta State, Nigeria
- Education: Delta State University
- Occupation: Politician, businessman

Jamani Tommy Ejiro is a Nigerian politician serving as Commissioner for Environment in Delta State under Executive Council of Delta State since August 2023.

== Early life and career ==
Ejiro was born in 1985 in Okuo-Ozue, Sapele Local Government Area, Delta State. He studied Sociology at Delta State University, Abraka. He previously worked as Managing Director of Austine Edwards Nigeria Limited in Sapele. He later served as Deputy Director of Media and Publicity for the Peoples Democratic Party (PDP) in Sapele Local Government Area and was a member of the Delta State Campaign Council.

== Career ==
In July 2023, Governor Sheriff Oborevwori nominated Ejiro to the Delta State Executive Council. Following screening by the Delta State House of Assembly, he was sworn in as Commissioner for Environment on 22 August 2023.
