= Cynthia Shalom =

Nigerian actress and businessperson (born 1988)

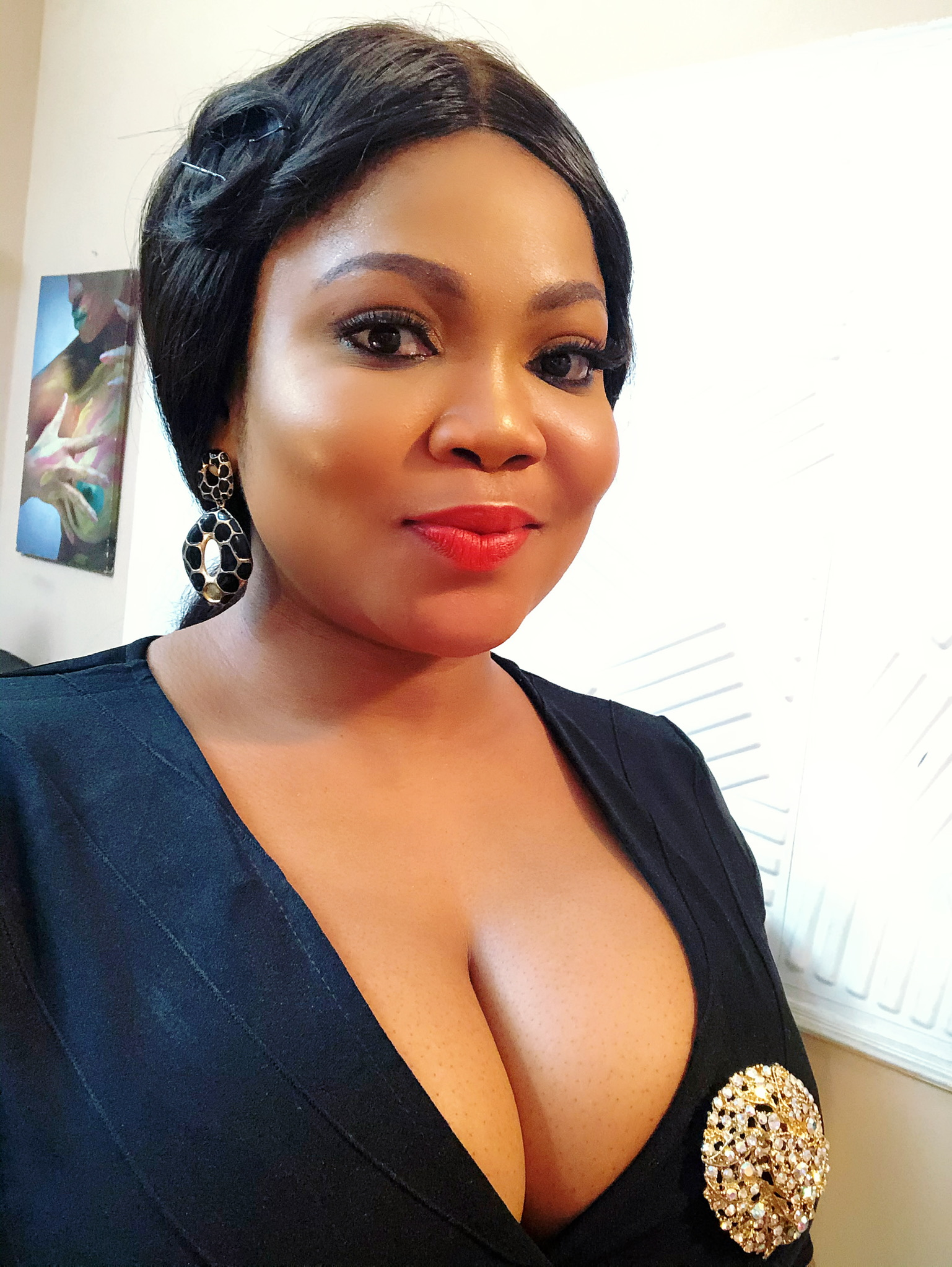
- Shalom in 2020
- Born: 18 March 1988 (age 38); Ede, Osun State, Nigeria
- Citizenship: Nigeria
- Education: University of Port Harcourt
- Occupations: Actress, producer, businesswoman
- Years active: 2015 - present
- Notable work: Next Movie Star

Cynthia Shalom // (born 18 March 1988) is a Nigerian actress, producer, blogger, and businessperson. She won season 11 of the reality show, Next Movie Star. She has since then featured in several Nollywood films. She was featured in the M-net TV series Tinsel.

== Early life and education ==
Cynthia Shalom was born in Ede, Osun State, a state located in the southwestern region of Nigeria. She is the first daughter from a family of three sons and two daughters. She had her Primary and Secondary Education in Port Harcourt, the capital city of Rivers State, located in the south-south region of Nigeria where she lived with her parents. Having obtained a degree in Management from the University of Port Harcourt and an Acting certification from the Africa International Film Festival (AFRIFF) talent development workshop, in an interview with Vanguard Nigeria she said she relocated to Lagos to pursue her career in acting.

== Career ==
Shalom was the winner of the Next Movie Star Reality Show in 2015/2016. She made her acting debut in Monalisa Chinda’s talk show titled You & I with Monalisa. She told The Punch that rejections were one of the hurdles she had to surmount while starting out in Nollywood. In 2016, she was cast in her first feature film An Hour With The Shrink with Annie Macaulay-Idibia, Gbenro Ajibade, and Segun Arinze. Shalom co-starred with Desmond Elliot in The Damned an Irokotv film. In 2018, Shalom started her film production company, Cynthia Shalom Productions. Her role in one of her movies titled Chain, which features Eddie Watson, Enado Odigie, Emem Ufot, earned her two individual nominations; Best Actress in a Leading role and Most Promising Actress at the 2019 Best of Nollywood Awards.

== Selected filmography ==
=== Films ===
- Next Movie Star (2015/2016)
- Iquo’s Journal (2015).
- An Hour with The Shrink (2016)
- Thorns of love (2016)
- No I Don't (2017)
- The Damned (2017) as Emelda
- Roberta (2017)
- Karma (2017)
- Ebomisi (Irokotv) (2018).
- Chain (2018) as Tamara
- Driver (2018)
- Altered Desire (Africa Magic) (2019)
- Beauty in the Broken (Irokotv) (2019)
- The Second Bed (2020).
- Back to the Wild (Irokotv) (2019)
- Rachel’s Triumph (2019)
- Shut (2020)
- Fading Blues (Irokotv) (2020)
- Wind of Desire (2020)
- Half shot of sunrise (Irokotv) (2020) as Ima
- Birth Hurts (2020)
- Benediction (Irokotv) (2021)
- Paranoid (2021) as Lisa
- Love Castle (2021) as Adanma Chi-Joshua
- Benediction (2020)
- Birth Hurts (2022)

=== Television ===
- Dear Diary Season 2 (2016).
- Tales of Eve (2017)
- I5ive (2019)
- Jela (2019)
- Tinsel (2017-present)

== Awards and nominations ==
Year	Event	Prize	Result	Ref
2016	All Youth Tush Awards	Next Rated Act (Female)	Nominated	
2019	Maya Awards Africa	Nollywood's New Bride	Nominated	
2019	Best of Nollywood Awards	Best Actress in a Leading Role	Nominated	
2019	Best of Nollywood Awards	Most Promising Actress	Nominated	
