= Olufunke =

- Gender: Female
- Language: Yoruba

Origin
- Word/name: Nigerian
- Meaning: God gave me to care for

Olufunke (sometimes as Funke) is a Yoruba given name meaning "God gave me to care for".

== Notable people ==
- Funke Abimbola, Nigerian businesswoman and lawyer
- Olufunke Adeboye, Nigerian professor
- Olufunke Adedoyin (1962–2018), Nigerian politician and lawmaker
- Funke Adesiyan, Nigerian actress
- Funke Akindele (born 1977), Nigerian actress
- Olufunke Baruwa (born 1976), Nigerian gender and development practitioner
- Funke Bucknor-Obruthe (born 1976), Nigerian entrepreneur and lawyer
- Funke Egbemode, Nigerian journalist
- Funke Oladoye (born 1993), Nigerian sprinter
- Funke Opeke (born 1961), Nigerian electrical engineer
- Olufunke Oshonaike (born 1974), Nigerian table tennis player
- Funke Osibodu (born 1959), Nigerian banker
