= David Akande =

Nigerian actor and film producer

David Akande

David Akande is a Nigerian actor and film producer.

== Career ==
Akande won Revelation of the Year at the 2018 Best of Nollywood Awards.

In 2022, he produced Alaise. The film won Best Indigenous Language Movie (Yoruba) at the Africa Magic Viewers' Choice Awards. It was nominated for three awards at the 18th Africa Movie Academy Awards, including Best Achievement in Visual Effects.

At the 2022 BON Awards, Alaise was nominated for Movie of the Year, Best Use of Nigerian Food, and Director of the Year, while Akande received a nomination for Revelation of the Year (Male) for Alaise. At the Africa Movie Academy Awards, it was nominated for Best Film in an African Language, Best Nigerian Film, and Best Achievement in Visual Effects.

In 2023, Akande produced and starred in Asa. The film won the Best of Nollywood Award for Best Social Message Film.

In 2024, he served as producer and executive producer of the Mnet original movie Eti Keta. The film received nominations for Best Indigenous Film, Best Use of Food, Best Soundtrack, and Best Social Message at the Best of Nollywood Awards, and won Best Kiss alongside Halimah Ganiyu.

In 2025, he produced and starred in Erimorara. The same year, he served as producer and executive producer of the Mnet Original Series Kukoyi, which was nominated for Best Indigenous M-Net Original at the 2026 AMVCAs.

== Filmography ==
Year	Title	Role
2022	Alaise	Producer
2023	Asa	Producer
2024	Eti Keta	Producer, executive producer
2025	Erimorara	Producer
2025	Kukoyi	Producer, executive producer

== Awards and nominations ==
Year	Award	Category	Work	Result
2018	Best of Nollywood Awards	Revelation of the Year	—	Won
2022	Africa Magic Viewers' Choice Awards	Best Indigenous Language Movie (Yoruba)	Alaise	Won
2022	Africa Movie Academy Awards	Best Film in an African Language	Alaise	Nominated
2022	Africa Movie Academy Awards	Best Nigerian Film	Alaise	Nominated
2022	Africa Movie Academy Awards	Best Achievement in Visual Effects	Alaise	Nominated
2022	Best of Nollywood Awards	Movie of the Year	Alaise	Nominated
2022	Best of Nollywood Awards	Director of the Year	Alaise	Nominated
2022	Best of Nollywood Awards	Best Use of Nigerian Food	Alaise	Nominated
2022	Best of Nollywood Awards	Revelation of the Year (Male)	Alaise	Nominated
2023	Best of Nollywood Awards	Best Social Message Film	Asa	Won
2024	Best of Nollywood Awards	Best Indigenous Film	Eti Keta	Nominated
2024	Best of Nollywood Awards	Best Use of Food	Eti Keta	Nominated
2024	Best of Nollywood Awards	Best Soundtrack	Eti Keta	Nominated
2024	Best of Nollywood Awards	Best Social Message	Eti Keta	Nominated
2024	Best of Nollywood Awards	Best Kiss in a Movie	Eti Keta	Won
2026	Africa Magic Viewers' Choice Awards	Best Indigenous M-Net Original	Kukoyi	Nominated
