= Rose Aziza =

Nigerian linguist

Rose Oro Aziza (born 1956) is a Nigerian linguist. She is Professor of Linguistics, Head of Department of Languages and Linguistics and Director of the Urhobo Studies Programme at Delta State University (DELSU). She focuses on the phonology of African languages, especially Urhobo, which is her native language.

== Life ==
Rose Aziza was born on 11th March 1956. She went to St. Maria Goretti Girls Grammar School in Benin before studying English at the University of Ife, graduated in 1976. She studied for a MA in Linguistics at the University of Ibadan from 1979 to 1980. She studied for a Postgraduate Diploma in Education from the University of Benin from 1987 to 1988. In 1997, she gained a PhD in linguistics from the University of Ibadan.

Aziza taught English at several secondary schools before joining the English Department of the College of Education, Warri. In 1999, she joined the Department of Languages and Linguistics at Delta State University, becoming Head of Department in 2000. She became a Professor in 2007. In 2010 she was elected Dean of the Faculty of Arts, the first female elected Dean at the university. In March 2015 Aziza became Deputy Vice Chancellor of DELSU.

== Works ==
- (ed. with E. Nolue Emenanjo) Teaching Nigerian languages : experiences from the delta. Warri: Coewa Publishers, 1993.
- (ed. with Tanure Ojaide) The Urhobo language today. Lagos: Malthouse Press Limited, 2007.
- Towards a revitalization of Urhobom in The Language Loss of the Indigenous, 2016.

Aspects of the Syntax of Modern Nigerian Pidgin (2015)
