= Muna Obiekwe =

Nigerian actor (1980–2015)

- Born: 1980; Nigeria
- Died: 18 January 2015 (aged 35–36)
- Occupation: Actor

Muna Obiekwe (1979 – 18 January 2015) was a Nigerian actor. He was one of the most popular actors in Nigeria. On 18 January 2015, Obiekwe died from kidney disease. He was also the second cousin to fellow Nigerian actor Yul Edochie.

== Filmography ==
Year	Film	Role	Director	Notes
2002	Wisdom and Riches		Okey-Zubelu Okoh	Starring Chiege Alisigwe, Charles Awurum, Liz Benson, Justus Esiri
2003	Not Man Enough		Andy Chukwu	Starring Lasa Amoro, Amaka Aneke, Lilian Bach, Andy Chukwu
2003	Not Man Enough 2		Andy Chukwu	Starring Lasa Amoro, Amaka Aneke, Lilian Bach, Andy Chukwu
2003	No Nonsense		MacCollins Chidebe	Starring Stan K. Amandi, Ifeoma Anyiam, Chidi Ihesie, Bruno Iwuoha
2003	Arrows		Ekenna Udo Igwe	Starring Pete Edochie, Pete Eneh, Benita Nzeribe, Muna Obiekwe
2008	My Darling Princess	Ikeobi	Ifeanyi Ikpoenyi	Starring Stephanie Linus, Enebeli Elebuwa, Eucharia Anunobi
2008	My Darling Princess 2	Ikeobi	Ifeanyi Ikpoenyi	Starring Stephanie Linus, Enebeli Elebuwa, Eucharia Anunobi
2010	Secret Shadows	Alex	Moses Ebere	Starring John Dumelo, Ngozi Ezeonu, Tonto Dikeh
2010	Secret Shadows 2	Alex	Moses Ebere	Starring John Dumelo, Ngozi Ezeonu, Tonto Dikeh
2010	Men in Love	Alex	Moses Ebere	Starring John Dumelo, Tonto Dikeh, Halima Abubakar
2011	BlackBerry Babes	Duke	Ubong Bassey Nya	Starring Loveth Agboma, Emeka Amaugoh, Richard Amechi, Sugar Chika Asoegwu
2011	The Code	Italy	Nonso Emekaekwue	Starring Mercy Johnson Okojie, Muna Obiekwe, Prince Eke, Angela Okorie
2012	Miss Queen	Michael	Moses Ebere	Starring Tonto Dikeh, Joy Alim. Halimar Abubakar
2014	Negative Influence	Ken	Ifeanyi Ogbonna	Starring Demola Akani, Blessing Akpan, Owen Agudiegwu
2016	Deceptive Heart	Ken	Ifeanyi Ogbonna	Starring Ruth Kadiri, Blessing Akpan, Dabby Chimere
