= Matse Uwatse =

Nigerian on-air personality

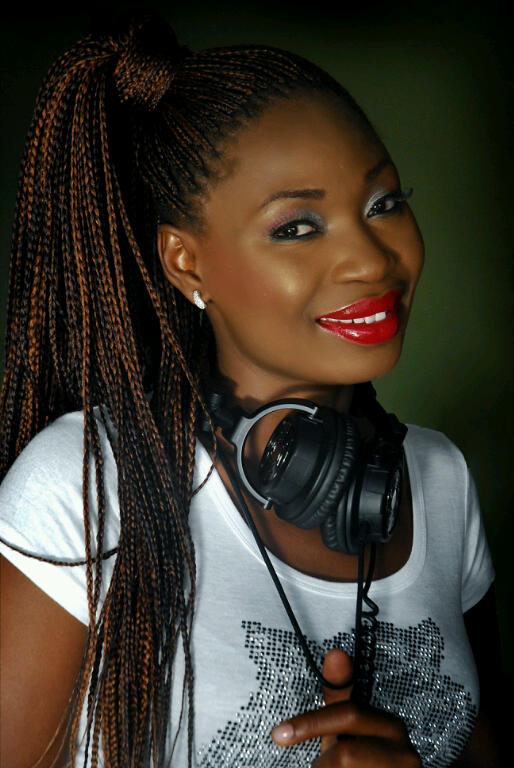
- Born: 10 May 1981; Warri, Delta State
- Education: Delta State University
- Occupation: on air personality
- Years active: 2008 - present

Matse Uwatse (born 10 May 1981), popularly known by her first name Matse, is a Nigerian on-air personality and food blogger.

== Early life and education ==
Uwatse was born on 10 May 1981 in Warri, Delta State in the southern parts of Nigeria. She is the daughter of John Uwatse (an engineer) and Pat Omare (a businesswoman). The first of seven siblings, she has four brothers and three sisters. She attended John F. Kennedy International school and Our Lady's High School both in Effurun. She then proceeded to Federal Government College Warri. She is an alumnus of Delta State University, Abraka, and had a course abroad in French studies at Village du Benin, Togo.

== Career ==
=== 2008 - 2011: "Coolele Zone" on Wazobia FM ===
Matse became associated with Wazobia FM, after a successful audition in Lagos in 2008. She hosted the midday show called Coolele Zone, on the Pidgin English-speaking radio station established in 2007. Her increased popularity due to her ingenuity to the broadcasting profession led her to win numerous awards including, Nigerian Broadcasters Merit Awards, Best of Nollywood Awards and The Future Awards. She was also listed as one of the top ten most powerful young Nigerians in the media.

=== 2011 - 2013: "Head of News" on Nigeria Info ===
In 2011, she announced her departure from Wazobia FM through social media. In an interview with Encomium Magazine, she explained that the reason she left Wazobia FM for Nigeria Info was because she wanted to challenge herself with something "tougher, that would broaden her horizon". She described her transition in broadcasting from Pidgin English to formal English as her biggest challenge during her time in Nigeria Info F.M. In September 2013, Matse was sacked by Nigeria Info, a decision she deemed as insensitive and ungrateful on the path of her former employers.

=== 2013 to present: Transition to blogging ===
In 2014, Sola Filani of YNaija described her impact of Nigerian radio as one that continues to "linger on" years after she quit being an on air personality. She described her decision to leave radio as a way of reevaluating her life and being closer to her new family. She now runs a food blog www.matsecooks.com . In March 2014, she explained that "Matse Cooks" will provide insightful information on foods and drinks that are culturally significant to Africans. Media personality, Linda Ikeji reported that Matse also makes food spice and seasoning in commercial quantities. In 2016, she was listed as one of 100 most inspiring women in Nigeria by YNaija. In 2020, she was listed as one of the top 121 food bloggers in the world by Social Animal.

== Awards and recognition ==
Year	Award	Category	Result	Ref
2008	Club Unique Awards	Most Captivating Radio Presenter of This Generation	Won	
2009	African Voices Award, Nairobi Kenya	Most Outstanding Radio presenter in West Africa	Won	
2010	The Future Awards	On Air Personality of the Year	Won	
2010	2010 Best of Nollywood Awards	Radio Personality of the Year	Won	
2010	Eloy Awards	Best Radio Presenter	Won	
2011	Celebrity Media Awards	Most Popular Radio Personality	Won	
2011	The Future Awards	On Air Personality of the Year	Won	
2011	Best of Nollywood Awards	Radio Personality of the Year	Won	
2011	Eloy Awards	Female Radio Presenter of the Year	Won	
2012	Nigerian Broadcasters Merit Awards	Most popular Radio Presenter of the Year	Won	
2012	Celebrity Media Awards	Most popular Talk Show:"Hard facts with Matse"	Won	

== Personal life ==
In July 2013, she married Ekemelu Bertran Nnoli. In 2014, she gave birth to her first child. Matse is fluent in English, French and pidgin languages. She also speaks a bit of German. In 2015, she announced on Instagram, that Abuja is now her place of residence.
