= Moyo Lawal =

Nigerian actress

- Born: Badagry, Lagos State
- Citizenship: Nigeria
- Education: Creative Arts, University of Lagos<be/> University of Lagos
- Occupation: Actress
- Notable work: Holding Hope
- Television: Jenifa's Diary
- Awards: Revelation of the year" at Best of Nollywood Awards 2012

Moyo Lawal is a Nigerian actress. She won the award "Revelation of the year" at Best of Nollywood Awards in 2012.

== Early life and education ==
Lawal was born in Badagry town and Local Government Area in Lagos State, Nigeria, and received primary, secondary, & tertiary education in Nigeria. She obtained her BSc degree in Creative Arts from the University of Lagos. She said she did not have children because it is hard work.

== Career ==
Lawal began acting in small play productions when she had been convinced to venture into acting by a friend of hers whilst in school. She took part in the Next Movie Star Nigerian TV reality show but was unsuccessful in it.

Lawal debuted her first professional acting career in the TV series titled Shallow Waters in which she played the role of Chioma in the TV series. Lawal's career became more pronounced when she got a movie role in an award-winning TV series titled Tinsel where she played the notable role of a character named Chinny.

Lawal In the 2012 edition of Best of Nollywood Awards stylized as BON Awards won the award for Revelation of the Year.

== Activism ==
Lawal who was a victim of an unsuccessful armed robbery attempt that occurred on third mainland bridge in Lagos, southwest Nigeria has created awareness of the incident by narrating her ordeal and suggesting methods to curb incidences as such to avoid a reoccurrence. She further explained that creating awareness was the only solution as after narrating her ordeal, several other persons reached out to her explaining similar ordeals they encountered on the same route, and she was also a victim of her sextape leaked.

== Awards and nominations ==
Year	Award	Category	Result	Ref
2012	Best of Nollywood Awards	Revelation of the year	Won	
2018	Best of Nollywood Awards	Best Actress in a Lead Role - Yoruba	Nominated	

== Selected filmography ==
- Holding Hope (2010) as Uche
- Bursting Out (2010) as Onome
- Brother's Keeper (2014)
- A Time To Heal (2017) as Omolara
- A Toast To Heartbreak (2018) as Elena
- Emem and Angie (2017) as Emem
- Madam’s PA (2017)
- Tangled Web (2017) as Jessica
- Millenium Parent (2016) as Esther Davies
- Desperate Baby Mama (2015) as Kimbery
- Parents’ Guard (2012)
- The Bridal Shower (2018)
- The Intern (2019) as Halima
- Red Obsession (2020)
- True Caller (2021) as Shukura
- Complicated (2022) as Regina
- Falling in Love (2023) as Juliet
- Big Gals on Campus
- Cloud of Pain
- Mistresses
- Never Love a Prince
- Thanks For Coming
- Judas Game
- Move Like a Boss (2024)

== TV series ==
Lawal has taken part in various Nigerian TV series amongst these are;

- Binta and Friends,
- Flatmates,
- Jenifa's Diary,
- Super Story,
- Edge of Paradise,
- Shallow Waters,
- Husbands of Lagos,
- Eldorado, and the award-winning TV series;
- Tinsel.
