= Emefiele =

Emefiele is a surname. Notable people with the surname include:

- Godwin Emefiele (born 1961), Nigerian politician, economist and banker
- Ndidi Emefiele (born 1987), Nigerian artist
