= Andy Egwunyenga =

Nigerian Professor of Zoology

Andy Ogochukwu Egwunyenga

Vice chancellor of Delta State University, Abraka
- In office 2019 – Nov 30, 2024
- Preceded by: Victor Peretomode
- Succeeded by: Samuel Asagba

2nd Substantive Rector of Delta State Polytechnic, Ogwashi-Uku
- In office 2007–2011
- Preceded by: James Ovri
- Succeeded by: Edna Nneka Mogekwu

Personal details
- Born: April 4, 1960 (age 66) Issele-Uku, Delta State
- Party: Non-Partisan
- Spouse: Ebele Egwunyenga

Andy Ogochukwu Egwunyenga (born April 4, 1960) is a Nigerian Professor of Zoology who was the 2nd substantive Rector of Delta State Polytechnic, Ogwashi-Uku and He served as the 7th substantive Vice Chancellor of Delta State University, Abraka till 1 December 2024.

== Background and early life ==
Andy Egwunyenga obtained his First School Leaving Certificate in 1969; he received a West African Secondary School Certificate from Federal Government College, Kaduna State in 1979. He studied zoology at the University of Lagos, where he obtained his B.Sc. in 1982. In 1990, he received a Master of Science (M.Sc.) degree in zoology with specialization in Applied Entomology and Parasitology from the University of Jos, Plateau State, and he became a professor of zoology at the Delta State University in 2005. He was appointed Second substantive Rector of Delta State Polytechnic, Ogwash Ukwu in 2007 and served until his tenure expired in 2011.

== 7th substantive Vice Chancellor of DELSU ==
On December 1, 2019, Andy Egwunyenga was appointed the seventh substantive Vice Chancellor of Delta State University, Abraka by Governor Ifeanyi Okowa to replace Victor Peretomode, and assumed duty on December 2, 2019.

== Personal life ==
Andy Egwunyenga is married to Ebele Egwunyenga who is also a professor in the Department of Educational Administration, Delta State University, Abraka, and they are both blessed with a daughter.

== Selected publications ==
- A.O Egwunyenga, J.A Ajayi, O.P.G Nmorsi, DD Duhlinska-Popova (2001). Plasmodium/intestinal helminth co-infections among pregnant Nigerian women, Memórias do Instituto Oswaldo Cruz 96 (8), pp. 1055–1059.
- O.P.G Nmorsi, O.A Egwunyenga, N.C.D Ukwandu, NQ Nwokolo (2005). Urinary schistosomiasis in a rural community in Edo state, Nigeria: Eosinophiluria as a diagnostic marker, African Journal of Biotechnology 4 (2), pp. 183–186.
- O.A Egwunyenga, D.P Ataikiru (2005). Soil-transmitted helminthiasis among school age children in ethiope East local government area, delta state, Nigeria, African Journal of Biotechnology 4 (9)
- O.A Egwunyenga, Ajaiyi J.A, Duhlinska Popova D.D and Nmorsi O.P.G (1996). Malaria infection of the cord birth weights in Nigerians. The Central African Journal of Medicine. 42(9), pp. 265–268.
- O.A Egwunyenga, Onojaife J. O and Nmor J. C (2016). Evaluation of the physico chemical indices of blackflies (Diptera: simuliidae) breeding sites in Delta State, Nigeria: implications for Onchocerciasis control. Journal of Coastal Life Medicine. 4(11), pp. 856–860.
