= Holding Hope =

2010 film by Desmond Elliot

- Theatrical release poster
- Directed by: Desmond Elliot
- Written by: Uduak Isong Oguamanam
- Story by: Emem Isong; Uche Jombo
- Produced by: Emem Isong; Uche Jombo
- Starring: Desmond Elliot; Uche Jombo; Nadia Buari; Abiola Segun Williams
- Cinematography: Austin Nwaolie
- Edited by: Uche Alexmoore
- Music by: Slam (Composer); Austin Erowele (score)
- Production companies: Royal Arts Academy; Denziot Studios
- Distributed by: Royal Arts Academy
- Release date: 8 August 2010
- Running time: 135 minutes
- Country: Nigeria
- Language: English

Holding Hope is a 2010 Nigerian drama film written by Uduak Isong Oguamanam, produced by Emem Isong and Uche Jombo, and directed by Desmond Elliot. It stars Desmond Elliot, Uche Jombo and Nadia Buari, introducing Abiola Segun Williams. It was premiered in Lagos on 8 August 2010, along with Bursting Out and was met with mixed to positive critical reviews. Nadia Buari and Moyo Lawal were nominated for "Best actress in a supporting role in an English film" and "Most Promising Act (female)" respectively at the 2012 Best of Nollywood Awards for their roles in the film.

== Plot summary ==
The film narrates the story of Mrs. Badmus who owns a multimillion business empire, but her son Olumide is very wayward and is not interested in running the business. Mrs. Badmus eventually reveals to her son that she is dying of cancer and she has few months left to live. She gives a condition that if he wants her to be happy, he needs to marry Hope the financial director of the company and a very dedicated employee. Mrs. Badmus also feels Hope is the perfect wife that can keep her son's wasteful spending in check when she is no more. Olumide orchestrates a plan with her girlfriend, Sabina and Olumide starts to fake his love for Hope, waiting for the day his mother will die. However, Mrs. Badmus' Will states that Olumide has to be married to Hope to have her properties; If anything otherwise happens, Hope should have the properties. Olumide has no other choice than to marry Hope, but however frustrates her with everything after wedlock, while still going out with Sabina. Hope, who continues to play a good and faithful wife despite her husband's attitude, finds out that she is also suffering from Leukemia. Olumide eventually falls deeply in love with Hope, but it is too late because she now has few months left to live.

== Cast ==
- Desmond Elliot as Olumide Sydney Badmus
- Nadia Buari as Sabina
- Uche Jombo as Hope
- Ngozi Nwosu as Sabina's mother
- Abiola Segun-Williams as Mrs. Badmus
- Rukky Sanda as Chioma
- Moyo Lawal as Uche / Hope's Cousin
- Ken Odurukwe as Mr. Rotimi
- Emeka Duru as Manager
- Kenechi Ezeani as Hope's Son
- Judith Itebu as Candy
- Uche Alexmoore as Sunday
- Bola Aduwo as Aunty
- Sam Obiakeme as Barrister

== Production ==
The script of Holding Hope was inspired by the account of three cancer survivors; Desmond Elliot and Uche Jombo believed so much in the film, so they both joined Emem Isong to executively produce the film. Speaking on the film, Jombo states: "we want to make people cry, laugh and perhaps pause and think at the same time". Uche Jombo had to lose a significant amount of weight to play the role of Hope in the film; She had to go on a diet and practically "starve" herself. During the course filming, she was made to sleep for only about 2 hours a day, so she can have a natural pale appearance, some little makeup effects were added on her as well. She also worked out excessively and was able to burn up to 50 pounds of fat. Jombo stepped out on some red carpet events before the film was officially announced which sparked rumours about her and her health status. The film was shot in Lagos. One of the cancer patients whose story inspired the making of the film and is being described in one of the characters died during the course of filming.

== Release ==
The official trailer of Holding Hope was released on 14 July 2010. It premiered on 8 August 2010 at the Silverbird Cinemas in Lagos, alongside Bursting Out, another Royal Arts Academy film. This was the second time Royal Arts Academy would premiere two feature films on the same day, after its double premiere of Guilty Pleasures and Nollywood Hustlers the previous year. The film opened to packed cinema hall; the first hall was filled in no time and a second hall had to be opened to accommodate the crowd. The film had its US premiere on 5 September 2010 in Dallas, Texas.

== Reception ==
=== Critical reception ===
The film received mixed to positive reviews. It was mostly praised for its cinematography, the emotional message, music and Uche Jombo's performance, while criticized for its bad sound quality, poor editing, occasional inappropriate music score and generally poor production. Nollywood Reinvented gave a 52% rating, praised Uche Jombo's performance, the film's soundtrack and commented: "For the most part, it [Holding Hope] was made up of motifs that we had seen before. There were very obvious signs of potentially great cinematography within this movie, but I couldn’t understand why suddenly the color and hue would just change when it wasn’t a flashback, dream or anything of the sort, the voices were also out of sync a lot. Slam is a musical genius and Ego’s “Bia Nulu”" was amazing! NollywoodForever.Com gave 84% rating, praised the cinematography and concluded: "I was taken on an emotional roller coaster ride from feeling anger at the way that Olumide was treating his wife, to sadness for her and then happy when the relationship was back on track. I loved Uche and Desmond acting alongside each other, there is a nice easy comfortable chemistry that translates perfectly on screen". Aghwana Amelia gave a rating of 8 out of 10, stating: "Holding Hope is a movie with a lot of morals. The director is very creative using different types of angles, shots, effects, movement and not limiting himself. The actors were able to show good acting skills, which portrayed the characters as they should be seen".

=== Accolades ===
Nadia Buari was nominated for "Best actress in a supporting role in an English film" at the 2012 Best of Nollywood Awards, while Moyo Lawal was also nominated for "Most Promising Act (female)" at the same Awards.

== Home media ==
The film was which is a single film was released on VCD in two parts, with each part lasting for approximately one hour. The film was also released on VOD platforms such as Distrify and Iroko TV.

== See also ==
- List of Nigerian films of 2010
