= Funke Adesiyan =

Nigerian film actress

- Born: Shukurat Funke Adesiyan
- Citizenship: Nigeria
- Education: Olabisi Onabanjo University; New York Film Academy
- Occupations: Film actress; Politician
- Years active: 2003–2011
- Known for: Eti Keta, Obinrin Ale
- Political party: All Progressives Congress (2018 to present)
- Other political affiliations: People's Democratic Party
- Awards: Best of Nollywood award Revelation of the year

Funke Adesiyan is a Nigerian film actress, politician and personal assistant on domestic and social events to Aisha Buhari, the Nigeria's Former First Lady.

== Early life and education ==
Adesiyan hails from Ibadan, Oyo State, though she grew up in Lagos State. Adesiyan attended her primary school at Time and Tide International School. She moved through Ibadan City academy, Saint Anne's School, Molete and Oriwu College, Ikorodu, for her secondary school.

Funke Adesiyan attended The Polytechnic, Ibadan where she earned an Ordinary National Diploma (OND) in Business Marketing. She later attended Olabisi Onabanjo University, Ago-Iwoye, where she studied Performing Arts and also obtain a Diploma in Law. Adesiyan travelled to South Africa and took courses on Interior Decorator before moving to the United States where she did a course in film-making and directing at New York Film Academy.

== Career ==
=== Acting ===
Adesiyan started acting professionally in 2003.

=== Politics ===
In 2011, Funke Adesiyan joined active politics when she became the southwest coordinator for Ibrahim Shekarau's presidential campaign. In 2014, she became the second entertainer to win a primary election, after Desmond Elliot. She contested but lost in the 2015 Oyo State House of Assembly election under the People's Democratic Party.

In 2019, Adesiyan was appointed as the personal assistant on domestic and social events to Aisha Buhari.

== Filmography ==
- Eti Keta (2011) as Adedun
- Obinrin Ale (2009) as Folake
- Ayoku Leyin
- Aparo
- Kakaaki

== Awards and nomination ==
Year	Award	Category	work	Result	Ref
2010	Best of Nollywood Awards	Revelation of the Year (Female)	Ayoku Leyin	Nominated	
2011	Best of Nollywood Awards	Best Actress in a Supporting Role	Eti Keta	Nominated	
