= Love Castle =

2021 Nigerian film

- Film poster
- Directed by: Desmond Elliot
- Written by: Beatrice Funke Ogunmola
- Produced by: Beatrice Funke Ogunmola; Victor Ogunmola
- Starring: Kehinde Bankole; Zack Orji; Rachael Oniga
- Cinematography: Lekan Adebayo Bature; Guadalupe Nunez; Tunde Ogunnnusi
- Edited by: Daniel Durotimi
- Music by: Timothy Tiodi Ogundele
- Production company: Hope Studio/BFO Media
- Distributed by: Blue Pictures Entertainment
- Release date: 10 September 2021 (Nigeria)
- Running time: 110 mins
- Countries: Nigeria; United States
- Language: English

Love Castle is a 2021 Nigerian film directed by Desmond Elliot, produced by United States–based Nigerian, Beatrice Funke Ogunmola and co-produced by Victor Ogunmola. The film centers on themes of tradition and family ties; it portrays Nigerian culture interwoven with disability and focuses on a deep-rooted belief about children living with disabilities, as experienced by the producers who have a child living with autism. It is a traditional story about the African culture of silence surrounding taboos.

The film stars Rachel Oniga, Zack Orji, Desmond Elliot, Kehinde Bankole, Jide Kosoko, and Adedimeji Lateef, with other Nollywood actors in the supporting roles.

The film was shot in both Ibadan, Nigeria, in November 2019 and Houston, Texas, United States, in February 2020. The US filming rounded up before the 2020 COVID-19 pandemic lockdown began. The language used in the film is majorly English with a minor mix of Igbo, Yoruba, and Hausa languages. The film premiered on 10 September 2021 at Terra Kulture, Lagos.

== Plot ==
Love Castle is a story about the Iregbogbo kingdom. The royal family has the task of getting a new king after the death of the last king of the kingdom. Adetutu who is the daughter of the late king is entangled with taboos after the death of her father. She leaves her family in Houston Texas, United States, against her wish and that of her family to become a regent in Nigeria after the death of her father.

== Cast ==
- Kehinde Bankole as Adetutu
- Zack Orji as Chizutere's father
- Jide Kosoko as Chief Ofun
- Rachel Oniga as Iyalode
- Desmond Elliot as Ayo
- Lateef Adedimeji as Chi Joshua
- Halima Abubakar as Show host
- Jumoke George as Iyaloja
- Cynthia Shalom as Adanma Chi-Joshua
- Femi Adebayo as Chief Balogun
- Beatrice Funke Ogunmola as Kanyinsade
- Jibola Dabo as President
- Peter Fatomilola as Eleemi
- Joke Muyiwa as Olori Adefunke
- Rejoice Regme
- Leonel Orji as Young Chizutere's dad
- Kemi Salami
- Deji Adenuga as Prince Adewumi
- Bakere Adeoye as Make traveler
- Segun Akintunde as Shekrano
- Ademola Amos as Pastor
- Martins Afeez Eniola as Blind teenager's father
- Aisha Lawal as Head Teacher
- Hannah Ogunmola as Adesewa
- Krystal Schuhmann as Stephanie

== Reception ==
In 2021, the film became an official selection of Toronto International Women Festival and Toronto International Nollywood Film Festival (TINFF).

The film received three awards at the Toronto International Nollywood Film Festival (TINFF) in Ontario, Canada, on 30–31 October 2021. The film received an award for Best Film Africa, and its producer Beatrice Funke Ogunmola (BFO) received two awards: Best Nollywood Film Producer and Best Nollywood Female Filmmaker. The TINFF Committee also gave one of the actresses featured in the film, Rachel Oniga, an honorary award.

The film producer, Beatrice Funke Ogunmola (BFO), was nominated and won the category Festival Film Mention for Narrative for Love Castle. The award was presented by the Abuja International Film Festival (AIFF), held in Abuja, Nigeria on 4 November 2021.

In 2022, the Memorial Student Center's Dr. Carter G. Woodson Black Awareness Committee (MSC WBAC) of Texas A&M University requested to screen Love Castle.

=== Awards and nominations ===
Awards and nominations
Date	Award	Category	Result	Notes
2021	Toronto International Nollywood Film Festival (TINFF)	Best Film Africa	Won	
2021	Toronto International Nollywood Film Festival (TINFF)	Best Film Nollywood	Nominated	
2021	Toronto International Nollywood Film Festival (TINFF)	Best Movie Producer - Nollywood (Beatrice Funke Ogunmola - Love Castle)	Won	
2021	Toronto International Nollywood Film Festival (TINFF)	Best Nollywood Female Filmmaker (BFO - producer	Won	
2021	Toronto International Nollywood Film Festival (TINFF)	Best African Female Filmmaker	Nominated	
2021	Toronto International Nollywood Film Festival (TINFF)	Best African Film Producer	Nominated	
2021	Abuja International Film Festival	Festival Mention for Narrative	Won	
2021	Abuja International Film Festival	Outstanding Feature Film - Love Castle	Nominated	
2021	Abuja International Film Festival	Outstanding Female Actor - Kehinde Bankole	Nominated	
2021	Abuja International Film Festival	Outstanding Male Actor - Jide Kosoko	Nominated	
