= Susan Peters (Nigerian actress) =

Nigerian actress

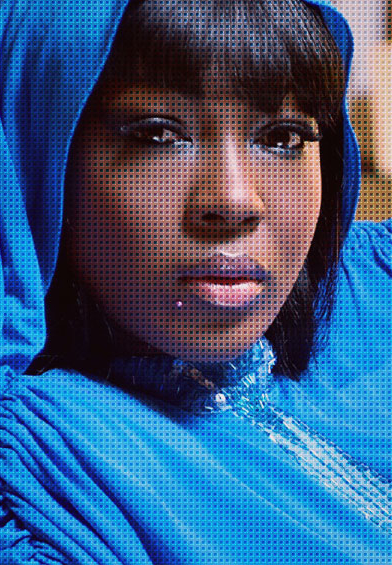
- Susan Peters 2011
- Born: 30 May 1980 (age 45); Ado, Benue, Nigeria
- Website: www.realsusanpeters.com

Susan Peters (born 30 May 1980) is a Nigerian actress with over 50 credits in Nollywood (Nigerian) films. She is a star on Nigerian TV, a successful model, interior designer and beauty salon owner. Recently, she won the 2011 Afro Hollywood Best Actress (English) Award for her role in Bursting Out, NAFCA Awards (Nollywood and African Film Critics Awards) North Carolina Nigerian Oscars: Best Actress in Supporting Role 2011 the BON (Best Of Nollywood) Best Supporting Actress Award 2011, and the Actress of the Year 2010 and Most Stylish Actress 2012 Awards from City People Magazine . In 2011, she made the December cover of the creatively acclaimed, arts and culture magazine, Zen .

== Early life and career ==
Peters was born into a military family of Idoma extraction on 30 May 1980 in Ado Local Government Area, Benue State in central Nigeria. Her family moved around Nigeria extensively and, as a consequence, she speaks several Nigerian languages. Peters was sent to Airforce nursery and primary schools and FGG College in Wuse, Abuja. She went on to study Computer Science at Asman English School, graduating in 1998. Later, she studied TV and Film at Video Waves and Camera Film School and graduated in 2002. There, according to her official biography, she finished Best Overall Female in her class. She started acting in Nollywood films in 2002, the same year that she graduated. The following year she began modelling and appeared in billboards, TV commercials, press ads and handbills for companies such as British American Tobacco (BAT), Fidelity Bank, Bank PHB, Golden Penny Pasta, UHF, Long-life milk, Haemeron Blood Tonic and FinBank Nigeria.

Despite increasing pressure for Nollywood actresses to perform raunchy love scenes and appear with little or no clothing, Peters has stated, more than once, that she is not planning to follow suit.

== Personal life ==
Although Susan Peters regularly speaks about her family in interviews. she is discrete about romance and has rarely been linked with any men in the popular press. She said in an interview in 2011 that she was in a relationship but didn't mention a name, stating that "It’s my private life and I like to keep my private life private. She was married to a Dutchman in 2015 but she is now divorced.

== Awards ==
This is a selection of awards received by Susan Peters:

- City People Awards: Outstanding Performance 2010
- NAFCA Awards (Nollywood and African Film Critics Awards) North Carolina
- Nigerian Oscars: Best Actress in Supporting Role 2011
- Afro-Hollywood Awards, UK: 16th African Film Awards 2011, Best Actress English Language, for the film Bursting Out
- Best of Nollywood Awards 2011: Best Supporting Actress for Bursting Out
- DIVA Awards 2011: award of recognition to the growth of the industry
- City People Magazine Beauty and Fashion Awards 2012: Most Stylish Actress
- Golden Icons Academy Movie Awards (GIAMA) Awards 2012, Houston, USA: Best Supporting Actress

== Filmography ==
Year	Title	Role	Director	Other Actors
2002	Wasted Effort	Masie Ayoade	Andy Amanechi	Ramsey Nouah, Rita Dominic, Muna Obiekwe
2002	The Hammer		Izu Ojukwu	
2002	Songs of Sorrow		Kabat Esosa Egbon	Tunde Alabi, Ini Edo, Pat Attah, Maureen Solomon, Muna Obiekwe
2002	11 days, 11 Nights	Betty	Kabat Esosa Egbon	Pat Attah, Dakore Egbuson, Yemi Blaq
2003	Squad 23	Julia	Tarila Thompson	Saint Obi, Liz Benson, Enebeli Elebuwa, Gentle Jack, Ejike Asiegbu
2003	State of Emergency 2		Teco Benson	Ejike Asiegbu, Bimbo Manuel and Saint Obi
2003	The Begotten	Maria	E. O'Squires Ogbonnaya	Ini Edo, Rita Dominic, Ngozi Ezeonu
2003	The President Must Not Die		Zeb Ejiro	Ufuoma Ejenobor
2004	Stolen Bible		Emeka Nwabueze	Emeka Ani, Kate Henshaw-Nuttal, Benedict Johnson, Chinyere Nwabueze
2004	War Front 2		Teco Benson	Festus Aguebor, Sam Dede, Steve Eboh, Enebeli Elebuwa
2004	Saving the Crown		Lancelot O. Imasuen	Patience Ozokwor, Jim Iyke, Festus Aguebor, Emmanuel Francis
2004	Wild Wind			
2004	Second Adam		Theodore Anyanji	Chioma Chukwuka, Eucharia Anunobi and Mike Ezuruonye
2005	Life is Beautiful			Pete Edochie, Stephanie Okereke
2005	Immoral Act		Obi Okor	Kanayo O Kanayo, Moses Armstrong
2005	30 Days		Mildred Okwo	Genevieve Nnaji, Joke Silva, Segun Arinze
2005	Moment of Truth	Gladys	Lancelot Oduwa Imasuen	Chioma Chukwuka, Mike Ezuruonye and Benedict Johnson
2006	Behind the Plot		Nonso Emekaekwue, Ikechukwu Onyeka	Desmond Elliot, Benedict Johnson and Stephanie Okereke
2006	Young Masters		Ikechukwu Onyeka	Osita Iheme, Chinedu Ikedieze and Benedict Johnson
2006	Ghetto Language		Sunny Okwori	Kelvin Books, Ini Edo and Desmond Elliot
2006	Good Mother		Amayo Uzo Philips	Stephen Ahanaonu, Ifeanyi Egbulie and Osita Iheme
2006	Nollywood Hustlers	Pauline	Moses Inwang	Uche Jombo, Charles Inojie, Monalisa Chinda, Ramsey Nouah, Ejike Asiegbu
2009	Timeless Passion	Nkiru	Desmond Elliot	Desmond Elliot, Ramsey Nouah, Uche Jombo, Mona Lisa Chinda
2009	Bursting Out	Ibiere	Desmond Elliot, Daniel Ademinokan	Genevieve Nnaji, Majid Michel, Desmond Elliot, Omoni Oboli
2010	Catwalk Series (TV)	Linda	Frank Rajah Arase	Monalisa Chinda, Uru Eke, Memory Savanhu,
2010	Black Heat			Tricia Esiegbe
2011	The Ransom		Aquila Njamah	Patience Ozorkwor, Funke Akindele, Jerry Amilo, Victor Esezobor
2011	Love Entrapped	Amy		Wendy and Desmond Elliot
2014	Champagne		Emem Isong	Majid Michel, Alexx Ekubo, Tana Adelana
2017	Celebrity Marriage	Joan	Pascal Amanda	Toyin Abraham, Odunlade Adekola, Tonto Dikeh, Jackie Appiah, Kanayo O. Kanayo
2019	"Last Days"	Mrs Aruba		

== Television series ==
Year	Title	Role	Ref
2015	Husbands of Lagos	Aisha	
2020	Jenifa's Diary	Naval Officer	
