= Beatrice Funke Ogunmola =

Nurse, film producer, screenwriter and actress

- Born: 15 February 1980 (age 46); Itaogbolu, Ondo State, Nigeria
- Occupations: Nurse; Film producer Writer; Actress
- Years active: 2010-present
- Spouse: Victor Ogunmola
- Awards: Best Movie Producer- Nollywood (Beatrice Funke Ogunmola - Love Castle) Won [2] Best Nollywood Female Filmamker (BFO - producer)

Beatrice Funke Ogunmola (born February 15, 1980) is a film producer, screenwriter and actress also referred to as BFO. Ogunmola received awards from the Toronto International Nollywood Film Festival (TINFF) for Best Movie Producer and Best Nollywood Female Filmmaker. The film Love Castle which she produced received four awards out of ten nominations, including three awards at the Toronto International Nollywood Film Festival (TINFF) in Ontario, Canada, in October 2021, and at the Abuja International Film Festival in Nigeria.

== Filmography ==
Films written, featured or produced
Year	Title	Genre	Role	Selected cast	Ref.
2024	Ajaku Akata	Drama	Producer	Bimbo Oshin; Ronke Odusanya; Wumi Toriola; Kanyinsola Eniola; Beatrice Funke Ogunmola	
2023	The Thorns	Drama	Producer	Lateef Adedimeji; Omowumi Dada; Woli Agba; Beatrice Funke Ogunmola; Jumoke Odetola; Femi Branch; Peju Ogunmola	
2021	Love Castle	Drama	Producer; Kanyinsade	Kehinde Bankole Jide Kosoko; Rachel Oniga; Zack Orji	
2017	Time to Live	Thriller		Lannette Gregor; Sola Alonge; Carlton Newark; Lupe Nunez; Rex Nwakamma	
	Time Bomb		Writer; Producer		
	Dear Momma		Writer; Producer		
	Great Mandate		Writer; Producer		
	Ageless World		Writer; Producer		

== Accolades ==
In 2021, Ogunmola received multiple awards for producing the film Love Castle.

Awards and nominations
Date	Award	Category	Result	Reference
2024	Toronto International Nollywood Film Festival (TINFF)	Best Supporting Actress: Beatrice Funke Ogunmola	Won	
2024	Toronto International Nollywood Film Festival (TINFF)	Best African Indigenous Film by Local Language,	Nominated	
2024	Toronto International Nollywood Film Festival (TINFF)	Best Supporting Actress: Wumi Toriola	Nominated	
2021	Toronto International Nollywood Film Festival (TINFF)	Best Movie Producer- Nollywood (Beatrice Funke Ogunmola - Love Castle)	Won	
2021	Toronto International Nollywood Film Festival (TINFF)	Best Nollywood Female Filmamker (BFO - producer)	Won	
2021	Toronto International Nollywood Film Festival (TINFF)	Best African Female Filmmaker	Nominated	
2021	Toronto International Nollywood Film Festival (TINFF)	Best African Film Producer	Nominated	
