= Delta State Ministry of Justice =

Ministry in Delta State, Nigeria

Ministry overview
- Jurisdiction: Government of Delta State
- Headquarters: Professor Chike Edozien Secretariat, Mariam Babangida Way, Asaba
- Ministry executive: Barr. Ekemejero Ohwovoriole SAN, Commissioner
- Website: https://moj.dl.gov.ng/

Delta state ministry of justiceThe Delta State Ministry of Justice is the Nigerian state government ministry, tasked with the delivery, organization, and administration of justice.

The ministry is under the coordination of the attorney-general and commissioner for justice, who is often assisted by the solicitor-general and Permanent Secretary.

== Leadership ==
The commissioner is the sole administrator and overseer of the ministry activities, and he was appointed by Governor Sheriff Oborevwori in 2024.

== Directorate ==
These are some of the sections of the Delta State Ministry of Justice.

- The solicitor-general Delta State/Permanent Secretary Ministry of Justice
- The Department of Public Prosecution
- The Department of Legal Drafting
