= Move like a Boss =

Nigerian film

Move Like a Boss is a 2024 Nigerian drama film, that explores a family's struggle to maintain a company's leadership role amid internal power shifts. The film stars Nancy Isime, MC Lively, Yemi Solade, among others. It was directed by Ekene Som Mekwunye and written by Tim McManus.

== Synopsis ==
The ambassador of Zenitech Group secretly travels outside the country. His daughter Joko, who is also a member of the company, discovers that the company's barrister and her aunt, Wura, are plotting to exploit a constitutional clause that allows for the ambassador's removal if he is not physically present for 25 days. Joko disguises as her father to prevent his removal from the role. She is nearly exposed by Anastasia, but her father returns before the situation gets complicated.

He fires both the barrister and Aunty Wura and cuts ties with Anastasia. The family reconciles and lives happily thereafter.

== Cast ==
- Nancy Isime
- Yemi Solade
- Moyo Lawal
- Dr. Jaiye Kuti
- IK Ogbonna
- Temitope Olowoniyan
- Sir. Victor Osuagwu
- Denrele Edun
- Michael Uba
- Aeries
- Yinka Quadri
- Dele Odule
- Nashaira Belisa
- Victoria Nwobodo
