= Next Movie Star =

Nigerian reality television series

- Created by: Sola Fajobi
- Country of origin: Nigeria
- No. of seasons: 12

Original release
- Release: 2005 – 2016

Next Movie Star is a reality television series, that is centered around discovering new talents in the acting profession. The show was created in Nigeria by Sola Fajobi in 2004, and in 2016 had grown to have representation from ten African countries. Participants are normally camped together for some weeks, and are groomed to become knowledgeable and skilled in their craft. The program is usually broadcast to several television channels across the continent.

Some of its alumni that have become established in the entertainment industry includes' Tonto Dikeh (2005), Uti Nwachukwu, Karen Igho, Annie Idibia (2005), Tamara Eteimo, Lydia Forson (2007), Belinda Effah, Cynthia Shalom, Bolaji Ogunmola, Moyo Lawal (2006), Seun Akindele, Kevin Chuwang Pam (2006), Martha Ankomah (2007) and Esau Owusu Dahnsaw (2015).

== Memorable moments ==
The first edition of Next Movie Star (NMS) was in 2005, consisting of aspiring Nigerian actors. Its founder, Sola Fajobi stated in an interview that it is Nigeria's second ever reality show. By 2010, the show expanded to include ten African countries including Ghana, Liberia and Sierra Leone. Aside having a career in the film industry, participants of NMS have also seen success in other reality television shows, such as Big Brother Africa and Project Fame West Africa.

In 2008, former winner Portia Yamaha was nominated as best upcoming actress at the 2008 Africa Movie Academy Awards, the biggest celebration of film on the African continent.

In 2014, commemorating the 10th edition, child actors were involved in the reality show. This was the first time children will be taught acting since the show began in 2005.

== List of winners ==
Year	Winner
2005	Kinglesy Ogbosso
2006	Porttia Yahamah
2007	Enoch Hammond
2008	(Liberia) Avenette Tennema Sirleaf
2009	(Nigeria) Oyindamola Odesola
2010	Ilami Whyte
2011	Tamara Eteimo
2012	Halimat Aitsegame
2013	(Nigeria) Feyisekemi Ayomiposi Akinwale
2014	(Ghana) Ron Solomon Maxwell
2015	Cynthia Shalom
2016	(Nigeria) Modesinuola Ogundiwin
