= Samuel Asagba =

Nigerian biochemist

Samuel Ogheneovo Asagba

Vice chancellor of Delta State University, Abraka
- Incumbent
- Assumed office 1 December 2024
- Preceded by: Andy Egwunyenga

Personal details
- Education: University of Benin; University of Lagos

Samuel Ogheneovo Asagba is a Nigerian biochemist and 8th vice chancellor of Delta State University, Nigeria since 1 December 2024 succeeding Andy Egwunyenga. He was appointed the vice chancellor of the school on 22 October 2024 for a five years single term by Sheriff Oborevwori, the governor of Delta State. Prior to his appointment as vice chancellor, he was the deputy vice chancellor of academics at the same university.
