= Men in Love (film) =

2010 Nigerian drama film

- VCD cover
- Directed by: Moses Ebere
- Screenplay by: Juliet Chisom Okereke
- Produced by: Kingsley Okereke
- Starring: Tonto Dikeh; John Dumelo; Muna Obiekwe; Halima Abubakar
- Edited by: Uche Ike
- Production company: Divine Touch Production Limited
- Release date: 2010
- Running time: 75 minutes
- Country: Nigeria
- Language: English

Men in Love is a 2010 direct-to-video Nigerian drama film directed by Moses Ebere and starring Tonto Dike, John Dumelo and Halima Abubakar. The film tells a story of how a couple experiencing troubles in their marriage has their situation worsened when a cursed homosexual friend visits them.

The film is in two parts. The first part tells a story of how a previously promiscuous husband (Charles) became the love interest of his obsessive homosexual friend (Alex). Further, it establishes that despite his refusing the advances of his gay friend, Alex persisted and eventually raped his friend. The second part of the film explored what led to the homosexuality.

== Plot ==
Charles (John Dumelo) and Whitney (Tonto Dike) are a young couple with kids. However, their marriage is blurred by the frequent extra-marital affairs by Charles. After being caught in the act with his secretary, Whitney decided to call it quits. Despite conflicting advice from her friends, Flora (Halima Abubakar) and Rina, she eventually accepted an apology from her husband for the utmost time. As a way of rejuvenating their marriage, Charles and Whitney decided to go on a vacation. At the hotel, they walked into one of Charles past lovers, which got Whitney irritated. Charles encountered his friend from University of Ibadan, Alex (Muna Obiekwe) who resolved the issue after some personal conversation with Whitney.

After the vacation, Alex took Charles out for lunch and he began discussing with Charles on the benefits of being gay or bi as a man and countered the religious sentiment of Charles on homosexuality. He ended the conversation by opening up to him that he's attracted to men. He continued making sexual advances towards Charles, who grew uncomfortable by the provocative texts, calls and touches. When it became clear that Charles wouldn't reciprocate his advances, Alex tricked Charles into believing he will remain just a friend and got him to attend his birthday party, where Alex drugged and raped him. The part one (75 minutes) ends after Charles woke up the next day and angrily left Alex's house, after assaulting him in annoyance, on discovery that he had forcefully had his way with him.

== Cast ==
- Tonto Dikeh as Whitney
- John Dumelo as Charles
- Muna Obiekwe as Alex
- Halima Abubakar as Flora
- Becky Ogbuefi as Pastor
- Promise Amadi as Bobby
- Ndu Ugochukwu as Cain
- Queen Okoro as Tasha
- Nora Ugo as Barrister
- Tetete as Bishop Duruzor

== Reception ==
Nollywood Reinvented gave it a 2.5 out of 5 rating and concluded that "Interestingly enough, this story is not really as controversial as it was hyped up to be. It in no way addresses the issue of homosexuality in the modern African society.".

== Controversies ==
Following the criticism that followed with his casting in the film, John Dumelo released a statement where he explained that the major reason why he accepted to act in the film "...was just to create awareness that people who are actually gay most likely are under demonic spells." In another interview he stated that he loves women and will never be gay but does not regret taking the role in the film.

== See also ==
- List of Nigerian films of 2010
