= Baby Thief =

Ghanaian Movie

- Starring: Emmanuel Yeboah Asomah; John Dumelo
- Release date: 1992
- Country: Ghana

Baby thief is a Ghanaian movie that was acted in 1991 and was released in 1992. The movie features Emmanuel Yeboah Asomah and John Dumelo as a toddler known as saka who.

== Cast ==
- John Dumelo as Saka
- Emmanuel Yeboah Asomah (KLB), now a Counselor, a Nurse and HIV advocate in Ghana
- Billy Agbotse as Boye Sowa
- Wanda Agogo as Efua Bansah
- Kwesi Appiah as Taxi Driver
- Ebo Banson as Akwei Mensah
- Esi Bentil as Nurse
- Esi Budu as Lebene
- David Cofie as Father
- Theresa Dogbe as Akosua
