= Ekemejero Ohwovoriole =

Nigerian lawyer and public official

Attorney General and Commissioner for Justice, Delta State
- Incumbent
- Assumed office February 2024

Personal details
- Occupation: Legal practitioner, politician

Ekemejero Ohwovoriole, SAN is a Nigerian legal practitioner and politician serving as the Attorney General and Commissioner for Justice in Delta State, Nigeria since February 2024, in the cabinet of Governor Sheriff Oborevwori.

== Early life and education ==
Ohwovoriole is from Agbon Olomu in Ughelli South Local Government Area, Delta State. He holds both a Bachelor of Laws and a Master of Laws degree from the University of Lagos. He was called to the Nigerian Bar in 1995 and completed his National Youth Service Corps with Mrakpor & Oju Chambers in Lagos.

== Legal career ==
After NYSC, Ohwovoriole began his legal practice at the chambers of Chief M. P. Ohwovoriole, SAN, in Lagos. He served as a part-time lecturer at the Lagos campus of Delta State University and was later invited to the Delta State public service in 2003 as Special Assistant to the Attorney General and Commissioner for Justice, representing the state in the Court of Appeal and Supreme Court in notable cases.

He established Aequitas Chambers, a full-service law firm based in Asaba with branches in Lagos and Abuja, specialising in constitutional, criminal, commercial, and election law. He was appointed a Notary Public in 2005 and elevated to Senior Advocate of Nigeria (SAN) in 2017.

Ohwovoriole served on the National Executive Committee of the Nigerian Bar Association from 2010 to 2017 and participated in key committees, including the Judiciary Committee, Rules and Practice Committee, and Administration of Justice Committee. He also held roles in professional organisations such as the International Bar Association and the Nigerian Norwegian Chamber of Commerce.

== Public office ==
In February 2024, Ohwovoriole was appointed Attorney General and Commissioner for Justice of Delta State by Governor Sheriff Oborevwori and sworn into the State Executive Council. During his tenure, he has overseen initiatives to improve the administration of justice and the implementation of criminal justice reforms in the state.

In his role, he has articulated support for improved synergy between investigative agencies and the Ministry of Justice to enhance justice delivery and has announced plans for modernising criminal information systems in the state as part of the government's technological reforms.

== Professional associations and honours ==
Ohwovoriole is a member of the International Bar Association and the Nigerian Bar Association. He is a Fellow of the Nigerian Institute of Chartered Arbitrators and holds associate memberships with the Chartered Institute of Taxation of Nigeria and the Business Recovery and Insolvency Practitioners Association of Nigeria.

== See also ==
- Delta State Executive Council
- Federal Ministry of Justice (Nigeria)
