= Okenmor Fidelis Tilije =

Nigerian banker and politician

Fidelis Okenmor Tilije

Commissioner for Finance, Delta State
- In office 2019–incumbent
- Governor: Sheriff Oborevwori

Personal details
- Party: All Progressives Congress (APC)
- Occupation: Banker, politician

Fidelis Okenmor Tilije (born 1958) is a Nigerian banker and politician serving as the Commissioner for Finance of Delta State.

== Early life and background ==
Tilije was born in 1958 in Obiaruku, Ukwani Local Government Area, Delta State. He is a Christian and Catholic.

== Education ==
He earned a Bachelor of Science degree in Banking and Finance from the University of Lagos, holds a master's degree specialising in Corporate Finance, and has professional certificates from Harvard Business School in the United States and Oxford Business School in the United Kingdom.

== Career ==
=== Professional career ===
Tilije had a long career in the Nigerian banking and finance sector, before entering public service. He worked in senior roles with institutions such as Merchant Bank of Africa Nigeria Ltd., First City Merchant Bank, and Standard Trust Bank Ltd, and served as Managing Director/Chief Executive Officer of Fortune International Bank Plc. He also chaired the steering committee for the merger of eight banks under the Alliance Bank Merger Group by the authority of the Central Bank of Nigeria. He lectured at Lagos State Polytechnic and later established ZEEP Engineering and Services Ltd.

=== Political career ===
Tilije was first appointed Commissioner for Water Resources Development before being reassigned as Commissioner for Finance in 2019 in the administration of Governor Ifeanyi Okowa and retained in that role by Governor Sheriff Oborevwori.

== Professional associations and honours ==
He is a fellow of the Chartered Institute of Bankers and the Chartered Institute of Marketers of Nigeria, and an associate member of the Chartered Institute of Nigeria Stockbrokers.

== See also ==
- Delta State Executive Council
