= Esau Owusu Dahnsaw =

Liberian actor and model (born 1984)

Israel Owusu Dahnsaw
- Born: Israel Owusu Dahnsaw; 21 April 1984 (age 42); Grand Bassa, Liberia
- Other name: Major Dahnsaw (Military Rank)
- Education: Shijiazhuang Mechanized Infantry Academy
- Occupations: Actor, administrator, model, voice over artist
- Years active: 2009–present
- Height: 5 ft 10 in (178 cm)
- Spouse: SINGLE
- Children: 1 Son.
- Awards: Best Supporting Actor 2024, Liberia Film Awards
- Website: youtube.com/channel/UCXZ3_lmI54I8RnxvjbWCfLA

Israel Owusu Dahnsaw, commonly known as Major Dahnsaw, is a Liberian actor, Minister, Administrator, Voice over artist and model. He is the Most Outstanding Liberian Actor/Frank Artus Studio in 2016. He is the third runner-up of the 11th edition of the Nigerian television show The Next Movie Star in 2015.

== Career ==
He hails from the Bassa Tribe of Grand Bassa territory. In 2014, he acted in the film DugborMar, which made his turning point. In 2015, he performed at the reality television show in Nigeria, "Next Movie Star" in 2015. During the competition, he became the third runner-up, as well as won two titles: The Most Photogenic Competitor and the Mr. Game Changer. After returning to Liberia, he was awarded with a special appreciation award from the Frank Artus Studios (FAST) and Actor's and Liberian Entertainers. Then in 2016, he was nominated in the Best Actor category of The Liberian Entertainment Awards in the United States of America. In the same year, he made his maiden cinema appearance with Freedom. The film was later nominated in the Movie of the year category in Silver Spring, Maryland, USA. In 2018, he acted in another cinematic movie titled PROVIDENCE alongside Vivica A. Fox, Van Vicker, Lisa Wu and the film was directed by Tyler Perry's Roger Bobb. In 2019 he also acted in a pitch to Netflix by Hollywood Producer and Director Stonz Walters titled CHILD SOLDIERS.

In 2016, he made his first Nollywood television appearance by acting in the series Shades of Grey. Then he acted in another Nollywood film, The Hidden Heir with Co Star Ruth Kadiri. Since then he has acted in more than 15 films and television serials in Liberia and Nigeria. In 2017, Dahnsaw was appointed as Liberia's Brand Ambassador to the Africa Cinematography Festival (ACF) in Nigeria. A position he currently holds.
