= Executive Council of Delta State =

Executive arm of a state government in Nigeria

The Delta State Executive Council (also known as the Cabinet of Delta State) is the highest formal governmental body that plays important roles in the Government of Delta State headed by the Governor of Delta State. It consists of the Deputy Governor, Secretary to the State Government, Chief of Staff, Commissioners who preside over ministerial departments, and the Governor's special aides.

== Functions ==
The Executive Council exists to advise and direct the Governor. Their appointment as members of the Executive Council gives them the authority to execute power over their fields.

== Current cabinet ==
The current Executive Council is serving under the Rt Hon Sheriff Oborevwori administration.

Office	Incumbent
Governor	Rt Hon Sheriff Oborevwori
Deputy Governor	Sir. Monday Onyeme
Secretary to the State Government	Dr. Kingsley Eze Emu
Attorney General & Commissioner of Justice	Ekemejero Ohwovoriole SAN
Commissioner of Finance	Chief Fidelis Okenmor Tilije
Commissioner of Economy Planning	Sonny Akporokiamo Ekedayen
Commissioner of Special Projects	Barr. Funyei Manager
Commissioner of Agriculture & Natural Resources	ADA VAL ARENYEKA ESQ
Commissioner of Basic and Secondary Education	Mrs. Rose Ezewu
Commissioner of Primary Education	Dr. Kingsley Ashibuogwu
Commissioner of Higher Education	Prof. Tonukari Johnbull
Commissioner Bureau for Special Duties	Etagherure Ejiro Terry
Commissioner of Lands and Survey	Chief Emamusi Obiodeh
Commissioner of Works (highway and urban roads)	Hon. Izeze Rume Yakubu Reuben
Commissioner of Works (rural roads)	Charles Ehiedu Aniagwu
Commissioner of Health	Dr. Joseph Onojaeme
Commissioner of Culture And Tourism	Dr. Darlington Ijeh
Commissioner of Environment	Jamani Tommy Ejiro
Commissioner of Housing	Hon. Godknows Angele
Commissioner of Science and Technology	Odinigwe Odigie Daniel
Commissioner of Trade and Investment	Samuel Oligida
Commissioner of Oil and Gas	Chief Vincent Oyibode
Commissioner of Urban Renewal	Engr. Michael Ifeanyi Anoka
Commissioner of Power And Energy	Jerry Ehiwario
Commissioner of Technical Education	Hon. Joan Onyemaechi Ada-Anioma
Commissioner For Information	Dr. Ifeanyi Osuoza
Commissioner of Youth Development	Agbateyimiro Isaac Weyinmi
Commissioner of Women Affairs, Community, & Social Development	Hon. Princess Pat .A. Ajudua
Commissioner of Transport	Onoriode Agofure
Commissioner Local Government and Chieftaincy Affairs	Kanemala Penewou
Commissioner for Girl Child Entrepreneurship and Humanitarian Support Services	Orode Uduaghan
Commissioner of Water Resources Development	Dr. Isaac Tosan Wilkie
