= 2009 Best of Nollywood Awards =

Event celebrating the Nigerian movie industry

1st Best of Nollywood Awards
- Date: 6 December 2009
- Site: Martinos Hotel, Ikeja, Lagos, Nigeria
- Organized by: Best of Nollywood Magazine

The year 2009 saw the first Best of Nollywood Awards, recognising achievement in the Nigerian film industry. Ramsey Nouah won Best Actor, Ini Edo won Best Actress, and Izu Ojukwu won the directors' award.

== Major awards ==
Winners are emboldened.

Best Actor in a lead role (English)	Best Actress in a lead role (yoruba)
Ramsey Nouah; Mike Ezuruonye; Yemi Blaq; Clem Ohameze; Ricardo Agbor	Ini Edo; Rita Dominic; Omotola Jalade; Bhaira McNwizu; Portia Yamaha
Best Director	Best supporting Actress
Izu Ojukwu; Daniel Ademinokan; Muyiwa Ademola	Mercy Johnson; Omoni Oboli; Annie Macaulay; Mosun Filani; Toyin Alausa
Revelation of the Year (female)	TV Personality of the Year
Kehinde Bankole; Nse Ikpe-Etim; Kelechi Ohia; Lola Shokeye; Bisi Komolafe	Mo Abudu; Frank Edoho; Denrele Edun
Radio Personality of the Year	Movie of the Year
Tosyn Bucknor; Dan Foster; Freeze	Distance Between; Omo Iya Kan; Reloaded; Cindy’s Notes; Okuta
