= Bisi Komolafe =

Nigeria actress and film producer (1986–2012)

- Born: Bisi Komolafe Veronica; 1986; Ibadan, Oyo State, Nigeria
- Died: December 31, 2012 (aged 26); University College Hospital, Ibadan
- Education: Business Administration, Lagos State University
- Occupations: Actress; film director; film producer
- Years active: 2008–2012

Bisi Komolafe (1986–2012) was a Nigerian actress, film director and producer best known for her role in the movies Igboro Ti Daru and Aramotu.

== Early life and education ==
Bisi Komolafe was the second child born in 1986 into a family of five in Ibadan, Oyo State South-Western Nigeria where she completed her primary and secondary school education. She attended St. Louis Grammar School, Ibadan before she proceeded to Lagos State University (LASU) where she graduated with a degree in Business Administration.

== Career ==
Bisi's acting career shot into limelight after she starred in the movie Igboro Ti Daru. She went on to play leading roles in films including Bolode O'ku, Asiri Owo and Ebute. Bisi also produced movies including Latonwa, Eja Tutu and Oka. She was nominated in the "Revelation of The Year" category at the 2009 Best of Nollywood Awards and in the "Best Lead Actress in a Yoruba film" category at the 2012 edition. She played the role of Enitan, the daddy's girl and also Bisi's friend in the TV Series "I need to know" alongside Funke Akindele and others.

== Awards and nominations ==
Year	Award ceremony	Award description	Result
2009	2009 Best of Nollywood Awards	Revelation of The Year	Nominated
2012	2012 Best of Nollywood Awards	Best Lead Actress in a Yoruba film	Nominated

== Death ==
The death of Bisi Komolafe was reported in the media on 31 December 2012. The circumstances surrounding her death generated several reports and speculations in the media. However, medical reports confirmed that she died of pregnancy-related complications at the University College Hospital, Ibadan. She was buried on 4 January 2013 in Ibadan.

== Selected filmography ==
- Igboro Ti Daru
- Aye Ore Meji
- Apere Ori
- Omo Olomo Larin Ero
- Jo Kin Jo
- Edunjobi (2007) as Neighbour
- Taiwo Taiwo (2008) as Nosi
- Akun
- Bolode O'ku (2009) as Pregnant Woman
- Aramotu (2010)
- Asiri Owo (2009) as Abeke
- Ogbe Inu
- Aiyekooto
- Latonwa
- Alakada (2009) as Dupe
- Mofe Jayo
- Ebute (2010) as Shola
- Iberu Bojo

== Personal life ==
She was engaged to a Canadian-based Nigerian, Tunde Ijadunola in Oyo state.

== See also ==
- List of Nigerian film producers
- List of Yoruba people
- List of Nigerian Actresses
