= John Dumelo =

Ghanaian actor and politician

John Matthew Kofi Setor Dumelo
- Born: John Matthew Kofi Setor Dumelo; 3 February 1984 (age 42); Accra, Ghana
- Education: Ghana Institute of Management and Public Administration, University of Ghana, Achimota School
- Occupations: Actor, Politician
- Years active: 1991–present
- Political party: National Democratic Congress
- Spouse: Gifty Mawunya Nkornu
- Children: 3

John Matthew Kofi Setor Dumelo (born 3 February 1984) is a Ghanaian by citizenship, an actor, and a politician. He is the Member of Parliament representing the Ayawaso West Wuogon Constituency as part of the 9th Parliament of Ghana. He currently serves as the Deputy Minister of Food and Agriculture of the Republic of Ghana, having been sworn into office on 13 March 2025 after his appointment by President John Dramani Mahama.

== Early life and education ==
Dumelo was raised in Likpe Bala in the Oti Region. His parents are John Dumelo, who was a civil engineer, and Antoinette Dumelo, a customs officer.

Dumelo had his basic education at Christ the King School in Accra. He schooled at Achimota School and was part of the school's Drama Club.

He went further to study civil engineering at Kwame Nkrumah University of Science and Technology (KNUST) but could not complete the course. He contested in "Mr. University" and won at KNUST. Later, he enrolled in GIMPA's School of Public Service and Governance for his Degree and Masters, which he was interested in.

== Career ==
He started acting in the early 1990s in a 1992 movie called Baby Thief while he was attending Christ the King School. He was paid 20 thousand old Ghana cedis at age 7.

== Business ventures ==
Dumelo is an entrepreneur. He launched his clothing line (J.Melo) in 2012.

Also, he is involved in both crop and animal farming.

== Engagement in politics ==
During the National Democratic Congress (Ghana) NDC Party's campaign In 2016, Dumelo was one of the most influential celebrities to campaign for the NDC government. Rumors had spread that, as an appreciation for his engagement and patriotism to the party, he was called and appointed by the former president of Ghana, H.E. John Dramani Mahama, to serve his party as a Director of Operations for a pro-NDC youth group for the NDC.

On 19 July 2019, Dumelo picked up a nomination form to contest in the NDC's primaries as a parliamentary candidate. On 24 August 2019, he won the NDC parliamentary primaries to represent the NDC in Ayawaso West Wougon Constituency in the 2020 general elections. He successfully launched his campaign manifesto for the 2020 election on 18 October 2020, promising to commit half of his salary to youth development in the constituency if elected. On 7 December 2020, Dumelo narrowly lost the parliamentary elections to the New Patriotic Party (NPP) candidate, Lydia Alhassan for the Ayawaso West Wuogon Constituency.

He contested as a parliamentary candidate of the Ayawaso West Wuogon on the ticket of the National Democratic Congress, and won the 2024 election convincingly.

He was appointed the Deputy Minister-designate for Food and Agriculture in February 2025. He was later vetted and approved by Parliament before he was sworn into office on 13 March 2025.

== Personal life ==
Dumelo is married to Gifty Mawunya Nkornu who is a lawyer. He held a grand wedding at Royal Senchi Resort in Akosombo. The couple's first child was born in 2018. Their second child, a daughter, was born in 2022 and their third child, a boy was born in 2024.

On 1 April 2014, he emerged as the first Ghanaian to hit a million likes on Facebook.

In October 2023, Dumelo pledged that he would trek "backward barefoot from the UG main gate to Presec main gate" if Presec-Legon won the Ghana National Science and Maths Quiz. He completed the walk after Presec-Legon won.

== Filmography ==
He has acted in films, including:

- Baby Thief (1992)
- Hearts of men (2009)
- The Perfect Picture (2009) as Fiifi Taylor
- 4 Play (2010) as Rex
- Chelsea (2010) as Marlon
- The Game (2010)
- Love Alone (2010)
- Men in Love (2010)
- The Supremo (2010) as Charles
- A Private Storm (2010)
- Mirror of Life (2011)
- A Night with Her (2011) as Drill
- End of Mirror of Life (2011)
- Adams Apples film series (2011–2012)
- Blackmoney (2012)
- Love or Something Like That (2014) as Alex Walker
- A Northern Affair (2014)
- Double Cross (2014) as Danny Frimpong
- Beautiful Ruins (2016) as Kojo
- If God Be for Us (2016)
- Black Men Rock (2018)
- 40 Looks Good on You (2019)
- The Perfect Picture: Ten Years Later (2019) as Fiifi Taylor
- The Agency (2022)
- Blood Vessel (2023) as Commander John Abe
- Hijack '93 (2024) as Captain Ambrose
- Blind Lust
- After the Wedding
- Crime Suspect
- End of Brides War
- End of the Maidens
- Final Innocent Sin
- Ghetto Queen
- Gold Not Silver
- Hero
- Holy Secret
- Humble Hero
- Hunted House
- The King is Mine
- Letters to my Mother
- The Maidens
- Marriage Planner
- My Fantasy
- Never Again
- Of Sentimental Value
- One in a Million
- One Night in Vegas
- The Prince Bride
- Queens Pride
- Secret Shadows
- Single, Married and Complicated
- Single Six
- The Snake Boy
- Suncity
- Tales of Nazir – The Movie
- Ties That Bind
- To Love a Prince
- Amakye and Dede

== Awards and recognition ==
Year	Award	Category	Film	Result
2010	Best of Nollywood Awards	Best Actor in a Leading Role	The Maidens	Nominated
2010	Africa Movie Academy Awards	Most Promising Actor	Heart of Men	Nominated
2011	Afro Australian Movies and Music Awards	African Most outstanding Actor		Won
2011	Africa Movie Academy Awards	Best Actor in a supporting role	A Private Storm	Nominated
2012	Ghana Movie Awards	Best actor in a Lead role	Queen Latifa	Nominated
2013	Ghana Movie Awards	Best Actor in a lead role	A Northern Affair	Won
2017	2017 Panafrican Film and Television Festival of Ouagadougou (FESPACO)	Best Actor West Africa	A Northern Affair	Won

In January 2023, Dumelo was honored by the University of Ghana for his philanthropic gestures to their students.

== Philanthropy ==
Dumelo paid the fees for visually impaired law student Gabriel Selasie Doe at the Ghana School of Law, Makola.

He established the Dumelo foundation in 2010. The foundation focuses on supporting underprivileged communities particularly in the areas of education and health. It foundation has undertaken numerous charity projects in Ghana and other African countries. The foundation, in collaboration with the Mastercard Foundation, has launched the Bridge in Agriculture Program. This program aims to provide affordable capital and technical support to small and medium enterprises (SMEs) in agriculture targeting women and youth entrepreneurs.
