= Ndidi Emefiele =

Nigerian contemporary artist and painter

- Born: June 12, 1987 (age 39); Abuja, Nigeria
- Education: Delta State University, B.A. Slade School of Fine Art, M.A.
- Known for: Bold and colorful canvas paintings of black women
- Awards: The Olive Prize 2016 (Excellence In Painting), The Slade School of Fine Art

Ndidi Emefiele (born June 12, 1987) is a Nigerian contemporary artist and painter. She was born in Abuja, Nigeria, and she currently lives in Northampton, UK. Emefiele's works are composed on large canvases and a great use of color and very bold brush strokes. Ndidi Emefiele started her career in Nigeria but later moved to the United Kingdom.

== Personal life ==
Ndidi Emefiele was born in Abuja, the capital of Nigeria. She was one of four sisters in her family, and they all vowed to protect each other. Emefiele described Abuja as being very conservative in their ideals and the way women are treated. Emefiele has also said that Abuja was in the very early stages of development when she was born. As a young child there were no art museums and all they had were books. It was from a book about artist Ben Enwonwu where Emefiele got the inspiration to be an artist and the desire to travel to London to pursue her dreams.

As a young girl Emefiele only showed interest in doing art. Even in classes involving other subjects she would draw doodles and sketches. Emefiele says she would go around the neighborhood drawing sketches of anything she saw, one day she drew a cat on the wall and her neighbor gave her a stack of papers to draw on. At this time, art was not looked at as a profitable career, so her parents were very ify when it came to this fixation on being an artist. Despite this she dreamed of going to Oxford or Cambridge and participated in art competitions during primary and secondary school. It was during her last year of secondary school where Ndidi would win an art competition that was televised for the community. This was the new leaf for her parents to accept her wishes of being an artist.

Because Abuja's University did not have a fine arts program she went to Delta State University in Abraka, Nigeria and graduated with a Bachelor's in Fine Arts in 2007. She would then go to the Slade School of Fine Art in London, UK and would graduate with her Master's in Fine Arts.

Currently, Emefiele lives and works out of Northampton, UK which is about an hour outside of London. She has three kids, one who she took in after the death of her sister in 2019, and they all live together.

== Works ==
All of Ndidi's works comprise black women. She says her paintings were made to create a world where women are allowed to thrive and be their true selves. Emefiele has spoken about how her art is made for the purpose of embracing and empowering black women, which is why her characters all live in a world without men. Her figures all wear glasses as a curtain or shield to hide behind in the face of a misogynistic society. She has also said that she does not like the stereotypes that come with being a female artist. In fact, during one exhibition she decide to stay completely silent so people could absorb her art without any pretences.

In art school, Ndidi began learning more about what she wanted to accomplish as an artist. At first her works were on paper but eventually she went on to canvas and creating bigger works. Through exhibitions and tutorials during class she was able to meet one of her inspirations and role models Lynette Yiadom. Emefiele has said that the conversation she had with Yiadom made a really big impact on her work.

When crafting her work Ndidi first imagines the composition then begins to find references that match her vision. The final product comes together after taking a little bit from many different places and is like a collage. Her work is a reflection of her experiences in Nigeria. Ndidi likes working with fabrics and the tactile feel while creating a piece. Both in Nigeria and the UK, Ndidi uses a mixture of materials in order to create her pieces.

Ndidi's artworks are also owned in private collections of Misty Copeland and Beyoncé.

== Exhibitions ==
=== 2012 ===
- Eden (Beauty & Temptation), Abuja Transcorp Hilton, Abuja, Nigeria

=== 2013 ===
- Unmatched-Beauty, Abuja Transcorp Hilton, Abuja, Nigeria
- New Traditions in Contemporary Nigerian Painting, Abuja, NIgeria
- Arthouse Modern and Contemporary Art Auction, Lagos, NIgeria
- Living in Silence (Deafness awareness), Transcorp HIlton, Abuja, Nigeria
- Plight of Women, Female Artist association of Nigeria, French Cultural Centre, Abuja, Nigeria

=== 2014 ===
- Life Through My Window, Nike Art Gallery, Lagos, Nigeria
- FNB Joburg Artfair, Sandton Convention Centre, Johannesburg, South Africa
- The Next Fifty Years: Contemporary Nigerian Art, organized by the Society of Nigerian Artists, Lagos, Nigeria
- 22nd Pan African Film and Arts festival, Artfest Los Angeles, California, USA

=== 2015 ===
- Cape Town Art Fair, Cape Town, South Africa
- The Slade Interim Show, Slade School Of Fine Art, University College, London, UK
- Contemporary African art Exhibition, Chelsea Town Hall Library, London, UK

=== 2016 ===
- Global African Profiles, Gallery of African Arts, London, UK

=== 2017 ===
- Loud, rosenfeld porcini, London, UK
- 1:54 Contemporary African Art Fair, rosenfeld porcini solo booth, New York, USA
- The Figure in Contemporary Art, rosenfeld porcini, London, UK

=== 2018 ===
- Pets, Parties, and a Cuddle, rosenfeld porcini, London, UK
- Reclamation! Pan-African Works from the Beth Rudin De Woody Collection, Taubman Museum, Virginia, US

=== 2019 ===
- Contemplating the Spiritual in Contemporary Art, rosenfeld porcini, London, UK

=== 2020 ===
- Here as heaven, rosenfeld porcini, London, UK
- Queen: From the Collection of CCH Pounder, The Charles H. Wright Museum of African American HIstory, Detroit, USA
- Xenia: Crossroads in Portrait Painting, Marianne Boesky Gallery, New York, NY

=== 2021 ===
- Ndidi Emefiele: Unconquerable, Retrospective at MoCADA, Brooklyn, NY, USA
- The Landscape: from the exterior to the interior, gallery rosenfeld, London UK
- Our Other Us, Art Encounters Contemporary Art Biennial, Timisoara, Romania
- Bold Black British, Christie's, London, UK
- Citizens or Memory, The perimeter, London, UK

=== 2022 ===
- Empowerment, Kunstmuseum Wolfsburg, Germany

=== 2023 ===
- The Gift of Fellowship, rosenfeld porcini, London UK

== Awards ==
In 2016, Emefiele won the Olive Prize for Excellence in Painting from the Slade School of Fine Arts.
