= Aramotu =

2010 film by Niji Akanni

- Film poster
- Directed by: Niji Akanni
- Screenplay by: Niji Akanni
- Produced by: Femi Ogunrombi
- Starring: Idiat Sobande; Kayode Odumosu; Ireti Osayemi-Bakare; Ayo Olabiyi; Gabriel Afolayan; Bisi Komolafe
- Cinematography: Ramesh Babu Raparthy
- Edited by: Abimbola Taiwo
- Distributed by: Treasure Chest Entertainment Ltd
- Release date: 20 December 2010
- Running time: 120 minutes
- Country: Nigeria
- Budget: 15 million Naira

Aramotu is a 2010 Nigerian drama film directed by Niji Akanni. It stars Idiat Sobande, Kayode Odumosu and Gabriel Afolayan. It received 7 nominations at the 7th Africa Movie Academy Awards and won the awards for Best Nigerian Film and Best Costume Design.

== Plot ==
Set in 1909, the film tells a story of a wealthy female trader, Aramotu (Idiat Sobande) in an extremely culture-conscious yoruba community. She tries to use the congenial qualities of the Gelede Cult in getting ideas on women's rights and establishing a government centered on the needs of the people. She formed a clan that includes a singer (Gabriel Afolayan) which eventually breaks up her marriage with her kindhearted husband (Kayode Odumosu). This new relationship threatens to kill everything she has built and affects her relationship with other community leaders negatively.

== Cast ==
- Idiat Sobande as Aramotu
- Kayode Odumosu
- Ireti Osayemi-Bakare
- Ayo Olabiyi
- Gabriel Afolayan
- Tunbosun Odunsi
- Peter Fatomilola
- Bisi Komolafe
- Ola Orebiyi

== Release ==
It was released on 20 February 2011 at Coral Reef, Ikoya Avenue ikoyi, Lagos State. The film has been screened at several festivals around the world, including 2nd Africa International Film Festival, Lagos, Nigeria (2011), Samsung Women's International Film Festival, Chennai, India (2012), Africa In The Picture Film Festival, Amsterdam (2012), Arusha African International Film Festival, Tanzania (2013) and International Film Festival of Kerala, India (2013)

It has also featured as showcase film at academic forums on contemporary African Cinema at the 3rd Ife International Film Festival, Obafemi Awolowo University, Ile-Ife, Nigeria (2012), and at the Tamar Golan Africa Centre, Ben-Gurion University of the Negev, Beer Sheva, Israel (2017).

== Accolades ==
List of Major Awards
Award	Category	Recipients and nominees	Result
Yoruba Movie Academy (3rd Yoruba Movie Academy Awards)	Best Cultural Movie	Niji Akanni	Won
Yoruba Movie Academy (3rd Yoruba Movie Academy Awards)	Achievement in Directing	Niji Akanni	Won
Yoruba Movie Academy (3rd Yoruba Movie Academy Awards)	Best Picture	Niji Akanni	Won
Africa Film Academy (7th Africa Movie Academy Awards)	Best Nigerian Film	Niji Akanni	Won
Africa Film Academy (7th Africa Movie Academy Awards)	Best Film	Niji Akanni	Nominated
Africa Film Academy (7th Africa Movie Academy Awards)	Best Best Director	Niji Akanni	Nominated
Africa Film Academy (7th Africa Movie Academy Awards)	Best Actress	Idiat Shobande	Nominated
Africa Film Academy (7th Africa Movie Academy Awards)	Best Film in an African Language	Niji Akanni	Nominated
Africa Film Academy (7th Africa Movie Academy Awards)	Best Visual Effects	Abimbola Taiwo	Nominated
Africa Film Academy (7th Africa Movie Academy Awards)	Best Costume Design		Won
