= Tales of Nazir =

Ghanaian Animation Series

- Directed by: Louis Appiah
- Written by: Louis Appiah
- Production company: Louicage Studios
- Country: Ghana
- Languages: English, Akan

Tales of Nazir is a Ghanaian comic animation series and a 2016 compilation feature film. It revolves around the character of Nazir and challenges he faces. The series was created by Ghanaian animator Louis Appiah and has been running since 2014. It often portrays Ghanaian celebrities and contains elements of political satire.

The series was nominated at the ZAAFA African Awards in 2015.

== Filmography ==
=== Films ===
- Tales of Nazir – The Movie (2016)
- Book of Eden

=== Animated series ===
- Nazir and Okra (Nana Akradaa Wahala)
- Tales of Nazir – Nazir Mona Bosom
- Tales of Nazir – Shatta Gringo.
- Tales of Nazir – Nazir and Kofi Kinaata.
- Tales of Nazir – Polling Assistant.
- Tales of Nazir – Eye Galagcee.
- Tales of Nazir – Rice Cooker.
- Tales of Nazir – Dumsor.
- Tales of Nazir – Bribery Gone Wrong.
- Tales of Nazir – Movenpick.
- Tales of Nazir – Visa Palava.
- Tales of Nazir – Call To God.
- Tales of Nazir – Nam 1 Finally Speaks.
- Tales of Nazir – Nazir's New Girl Friend Akua Becca.
- Tales of Nazir – Nazir, Kofi Kinaata & Anas.
- Tales of Nazir – Captain Planet with Bra Charles.
- Tales of Nazir – Nazir in Lagos.
- Tales of Nazir – Nazir And Wanluv Press Conference Gone Wrong.
- Tales of Nazir – Nazir And Bedi Ragga Battle.
- Tales of Nazir – Number 13, Nazir with countryman Songo And Abatay.
- Tales of Nazir – Nazir With Countryman Songo.
- Tales of Nazir – Menzgold Commercial With Nazir And Joselyn Dumas.
- Tales of Nazir – Valentine Special With Akuaa Becca And Nazir.
- Tales of Nazir – Keep The Peace.
- Tales of Nazir – Nazir Meets Stonebwoy in London.
- Tales of Nazir – Nazir Is Grown Up.
- A Letter to the President.
- Nazir Meets Ebola.
- My Dear Grandpa
- Tales of Nazir – Quarantine
- Tales of Nazir – Bossom Pyung meets Hajia4Reall
- Tales of Nazir – Nazir in Moscow
- Tales of Nazir – Elevy Whahala!
