= Bursting Out (film) =

2010 Nigerian drama film directed by Desmond Elliot

- Theatrical release poster
- Directed by: Desmond Elliot; Daniel Ademinokan
- Screenplay by: Uduak Isong Oguamanam; Bola Aduwo
- Produced by: Emem Isong
- Starring: Genevieve Nnaji; Majid Michel; Desmond Elliot; Susan Peters; Omoni Oboli; Nse Ikpe Etim
- Cinematography: Alexander Effiong
- Music by: Slam
- Production company: Royal Arts Academy
- Release date: 8 August 2010
- Country: Nigeria
- Language: English

Bursting Out is a 2010 Nigerian drama film directed by Desmond Elliot, and starring Majid Michel, Genevieve Nnaji and Desmond Elliot. It premiered at Odeon Cinema, Greenwich, London on 29 October 2010.

== Cast ==
- Genevieve Nnaji as Zara Williams
- Majid Michel as Tyrone
- Desmond Elliot as Bernard
- Susan Peters as Ebiere
- Omoni Oboli as Ini
- Nse Ikpe Etim as Tina
- Uti Nwachukwu as Ebuka
- Ime Bishop Imoh as Daniel
- Maryann Bassey as Petra
- Cynthia Chika Okeke as Rossie
- Amanda Ebeye as Ugochi
- Ibiwari Etuk as Feyi
- Nathaniel Georgewill as Tony
- Moyo Lawal as Onome

== Reception ==
Nollywood Reinvented gave it a 3-star rating and commented on the predictability of the ending of the film, because of its genre. Nollywood Forever agreed that the plot was formulaic, but gave the film a 76% rating because of the high quality of the production values, cinematography, and acting.

== See also ==
- List of Nigerian films of 2010
