= Victor F. Peretomode =

Victor F. Peretomode is an academic and served as the 6th Vice Chancellor of Delta State University, Abraka, Nigeria. Peretomode was appointed by Delta State governor Emmanuel Eweta Uduaghan on December 1, 2014. His tenure as the Vice Chancellor ended on December 1, 2019.

== Early life and education ==
He went to African Church Primary School, Forcados, and Mein Grammar School for his primary and secondary education. He got his bachelor's degree in education for political science (1979), at the University of Benin. He later travelled to Oklahoma, United States, to do his M.Sc. (1982), PhD (2004) and postdoctoral degree (1985) in international relations and comparative politics at Oklahoma State University, Stillwater.

== Career ==
Victor started his academic career as a graduate assistant at Oklahoma State University (1981–1986) before becoming a professor of educational administration and higher education in June 1996. He has occupied various positions such as deputy Vice Chancellor and department head. He was the first person to serve on the Niger Delta Development Commission (NDDC) board as the Delta State representative.

== Publications ==
He has over 90 publications to his name.
