= Fuad Kayode Laguda =

Nigerian politician

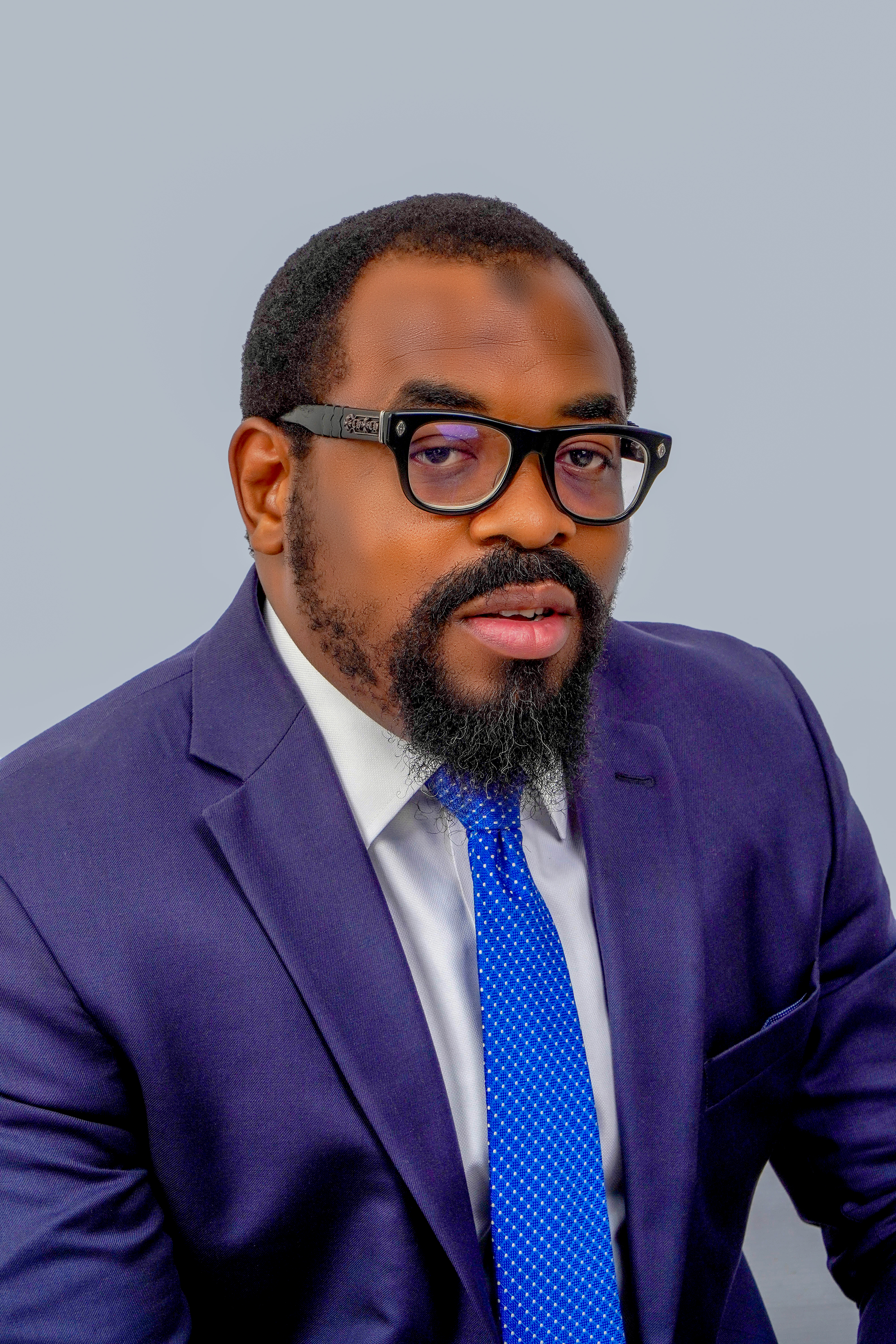

Member, House of Representatives, Surulere Constituency 1
- Constituency: Surulere Constituency 1

Personal details
- Born: 23 July 1977 (age 49)
- Party: All Progressives Congress (APC)
- Education: University of Maiduguri

Fuad Kayode Laguda, popularly known as FKL, was born on July 23, 1977, to the family of Late Ramota Olanrewaju and Muyideen Akinola Laguda of the Laguda Family of Lagos Island in Lagos State.

== Educational background ==
He completed his primary education at K. Kotun Memorial Nursery and Primary School, Surulere, Lagos before proceeding to Ansar-ud-Deen High School, Falolu, Surulere for his secondary education, which he completed in the year 1993.

He bagged a bachelor’s degree (Hons.) in Economics in 2000 from the University of Maiduguri, Borno State. He completed the mandatory National Youth Service Corps (NYSC) at the Debit Management Office of the Central Bank of Nigeria in 2001/2002.

He completed his Master's in Public Administration (Public Policy) from the University of Lagos (Unilag), and also holds an MBA degree from the University of Lagos Business School.

== Professional membership ==
Fuad Laguda is a Fellow of the Chartered Institute of Taxation of Nigeria (CITN); an Associate of the Nigerian Institute of Management (NIM); and an Associate of the Institute of Chartered Economists of Nigeria (ICEN).

He is an Alumnus of the Harvard Kennedy School/Executive Education, Boston where he was awarded a Certificate in Implementation of Public Policy; and likewise holds a Certificate in Entrepreneur Management from the Enterprise Development Centre, Pan-Atlantic University.

He has undergone series of trainings and courses both locally and internationally in Management, Public Policy, Leadership, Tax Administration, Human Resources and Management, Personal Development, and Entrepreneurship among others.

== Career ==
In 2003, FKL joined the Lagos State Board of Internal Revenue as an Inspector of Taxes II and was posted to the State Treasury Office as a Treasury Officer in 2005, later to the Office of the Chief of Staff as a Protocol Officer and rose to the rank of Inspector of Taxes I in 2006.

In 2008, the board became autonomous and was named Lagos State Internal Revenue Service, (LIRS) where he started as an Assistant Revenue Manager/Personal Assistant to the Executive Chairman. In 2012, he was elevated to the rank of Deputy Revenue Manager, and doubles as the Personal Assistant to the Executive Chairman as the Head of Public Sector Unit, where he verifies taxes of individual transactions with the MDAs. In July 2015, he rose to the rank of Revenue Manager and served as the Head of Public Sector Unit, and Head of Lagos Internal Revenue Service/Lagos State Physical Planning Permit Authority (LIRS/LASPPPA) Liaison Unit.

In 2016, he joined the Federal Inland Revenue Service (FIRS) as a manager, and worked at the Relationship Management Unit and Sector Account Management Unit in the Office of the Executive Chairman, afterward became the South West Nigeria Coordinator, Relationship Management Unit - Government Business Sector, and was transferred in 2020 to the International Tax Department – Non-Resident People’s Tax Office, and assumed office as the head of Value Added Tax Unit, where he served till recent time.

== Political life ==
Fuad Kayode Laguda is a member of the ruling All Progressives Congress (APC) and the honourable member representing Surulere Constituency 1 at the Nigerian House of Representatives He is also the Chairman, House Committee on Federal Polytechnics and Tertiary Education.

Prior to this, he has served as the Chairman, All Progressives Congress, Surulere Local Government; Publicity Secretary, Conference of APC 57 LGA/LCDA Chairmen in Lagos State; and Secretary, Lagos Central Senatorial District APC Party Chairmen.

In 2001, he aspired for the position of a Councillor for Ward G under the then Alliance for Democracy (AD). He was also a Lagos State House of Assembly aspirant in Surulere 1, likewise 2022, under the All Progressives Congress (APC).

During the 2015 general election, FKL served as the Chairman, Advisory Committee for Surulere Local Government Campaign Committee and in 2018, he was a Member, Planning and Strategic Committee for Independent Campaign Group of Babajide Olushola Sanwoolu Mandate Campaign Organisation.

He was made the Director, Media and Publicity Committee, Independent Campaign Group, Femi Gbajabiamila Team Continuity Campaign Organisation in 2018; Member, Planning and Strategy Committee, Lagos State Campaign Committee in 2018; Deputy Director, Welfare Committee WES Lagos Central Senatorial Campaign 2022/23 and the Director-General, Surulere (TGSEE) Campaign Council in the 2022/23 General Election.

== Humanitarian service ==
He has actively served as a Trustee of the Patriotic Association of Surulere (PAS), contributing significantly to various charitable initiatives in Surulere and its surrounding areas.

Additionally, he holds the position of Chairman on the Board of Trustees for the Magdalene and Maravi Foundation, a charitable organization primarily focused on the empowerment and support of orphaned girls, particularly in Northern Nigeria.

Furthermore, Fuad Laguda serves as a Patron for the Ansar-ud-Deen Youth Association of Nigeria (ADYAN), Lagos Branch.

== Social life ==
He is a member of various social associations such as Lagos State Public Service Club, F's Club, Bond Club, Ikoyi Club, Eko Club, and Lagos Lawn Tennis Club.

Fuad Kayode Laguda is married with children.
