= Charles Aniagwu =

Nigerian politician

Charles Ehiedu Aniagwu (born 1972) is a Nigerian journalist, public relations professional, and politician who serves as the Commissioner for Works (Rural Roads) and Public Information in Delta State, Nigeria. He is a former Commissioner for Information and Chief Press Secretary to the immediate past Governor of Delta State, Ifeanyi Okowa.

== Early life and education ==
He hails from Akumazi-Umuocha, Ika North-east Local Government Area, Delta State. He attended Umuocha Primary School and Ndemili Grammar School for his secondary education. He holds a National Diploma and a Higher National Diploma in Mass Communication from Auchi Polytechnic, a Postgraduate Diploma in Public Administration, and a Master's degree in Human Resource Management.

== Career ==
=== Journalism and media career ===
Aniagwu began his career in broadcast journalism. He worked as a correspondent with DBN Television and later with African Independent Television (AIT), where he was a National Assembly correspondent.

=== Political career ===
He was appointed Chief Press Secretary to Governor Ifeanyi Okowa, serving as the spokesperson of the administration. In 2019, he was appointed Delta State Commissioner for Information, and he served until 2023. In 2023, he was appointed as the Commissioner for Works (Rural Roads) and later, Public Information was added.
