= Idiat Shobande =

Nigerian actress

- Born: Ogun State
- Occupation: Actress
- Years active: 1995 - present
- Known for: Aramotu
- Children: 2

Idiat Shobande, sometimes written as Idiat Sobande is a Nigerian actress, who acts in Yoruba language films. In 2011, she received Africa Movie Academy Award for Best Actress in a Leading Role nomination for her role as the title character in the Yoruba women advocacy film, Aramotu.

== Career ==
Born to a family from Ogun State. Idiat joined Nollywood, Yoruba sub-industry in 1995. In 2011, Idiat revealed to Vanguard, that her role in Aramotu as a wealthy woman inspired her to promote gender equality in Nigeria. Idiat has featured in several Yoruba films, including Iyawo Saara, Abode Mecca, Omo Iya Ajo and Aramotu. Other notable films includes, Kondo Olopa (2007), Láròdá òjò (2008) and Igbeyin Ewuro (2009).

In 2010, Idiat played the title character in Aramotu. The film which portrayed Yoruba women as making major impacts in an ancient society, earned her Africa Movie Academy Award for Best Actress in a Leading Role nomination, although she eventually lost the award to Ama Abebrese.
