= 2022 Best of Nollywood Awards =

Award ceremony

- Date: 3 December 2022
- Location: Owerri, Imo State
- Country: Nigeria
- Hosted by: Lateef Adedimeji and Queen Nwokoye

The 2022 Best of Nollywood Awards was the 14th edition of the ceremony and took place in Owerri, Imo State on 3 December 2022. The event was co-hosted by Lateef Adedimeji and Queen Nwokoye while the Imo State governor, Hope Uzodinma served as the chief host.

Almajiri by Toka McBaror, Ayinla by Tunde Kelani and Jade Osiberu, and Amina of Izu Ojukwu are identified as the biggest winners of the awards show.
