= Delta State University, Abraka =

Public university in Abraka, Delta State, Nigeria

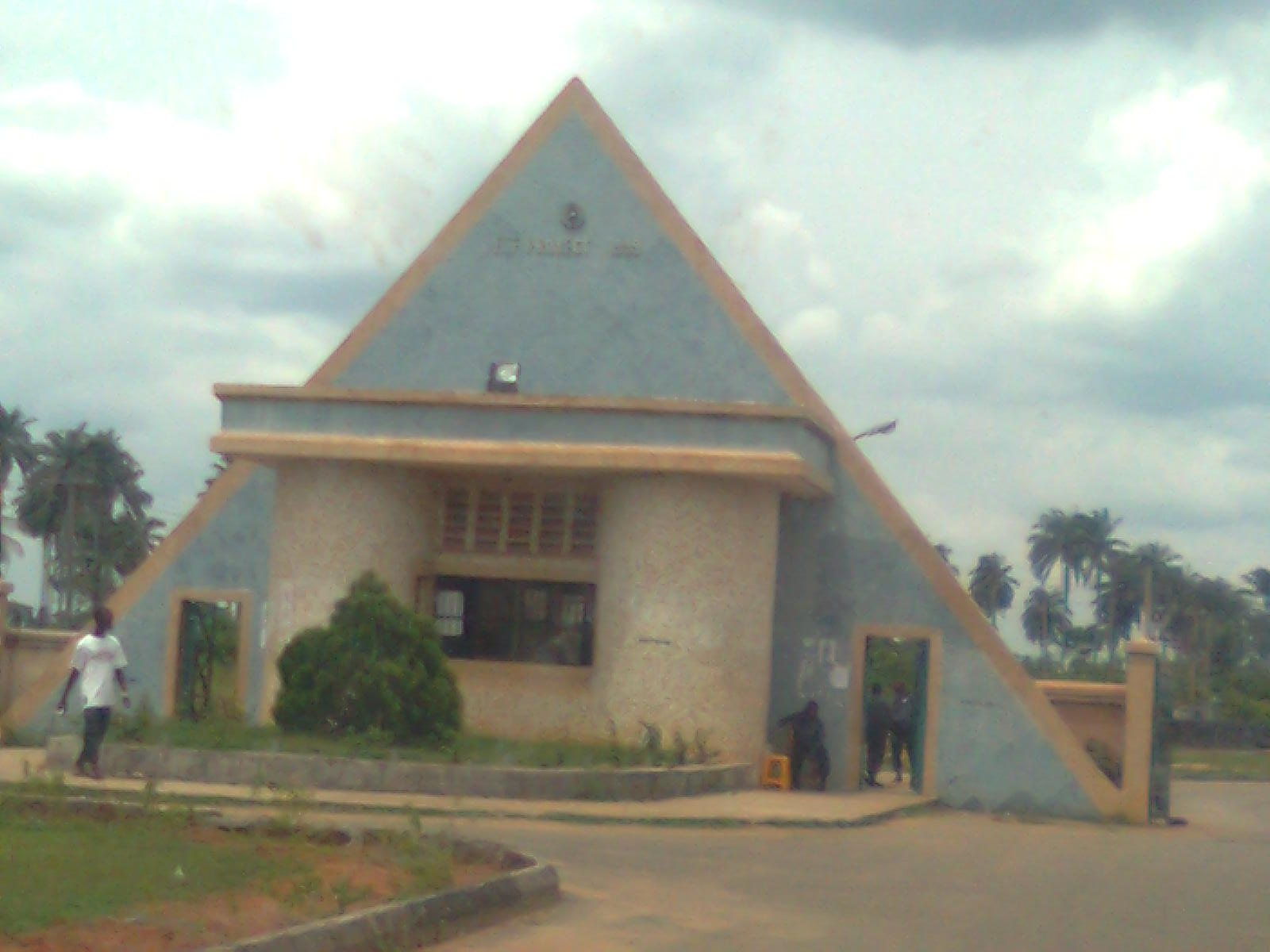
- Motto: Knowledge, Character and Service.
- Type: Public
- Established: 1992
- Vice-Chancellor: Samuel Ogheneovo Asagba
- Location: Delta State, Nigeria; 5.7917°N 6.0987°E
- Campus: Urban
- Website: www.delsu.edu.ng

The Delta State University, Abraka - popularly known as DELSU - is a State government-owned university in Nigeria with the main campus located at Abraka, Delta State and its sub-campus at Oleh.

The Oleh campus was established with the 1995 Amended Edict. The university is a multiple-campus university having two campuses within a distance of about 52 km apart. Currently, with a student population of about 22,000 (in the 2019/2020 session), the university offers a range of programmes from the full-time certificate, diploma and degree programmes to part-time evening and weekend degree programmes. DELSU offers postgraduate studies up to a doctoral level.

DELSU owns a staff/student counselling centre, an e-learning centre, student accommodation and sporting facilities amidst other infrastructures. It is one of over twenty-five state-owned universities which are overseen and accredited by the National Universities Commission.

== History ==
Delta State University, Abraka has been historically recorded as a Centre of Education. It started as a Government Teachers' Training College during the colonial era and some years into the post-colonial era. It became a College of Education that was awarded the Nigerian Certificate of Education (N.C.E.) from 1971 to 1985.

In 1981, it was affiliated to the University of Benin, Benin City and consequently offered degree programmes from 1981 till 1985 when it became the Faculty of Education of the then Bendel State University with its main campus at Ekpoma. The creation of Edo and Delta State in August 1991 and the conversion of the main campus of the then Bendel State University, Ekpoma to become Edo State University in December 1991, necessitated the establishment of an autonomous Delta State University, Abraka on 30 April 1992 by the then Executive Governor of the State, Olorogun Felix Ibru. However, Delta State University, Abraka started with five faculties, namely:

- Faculty of Agriculture
- Faculty of Education
- Faculty of Arts
- Faculty of Science and
- Faculty of the Social Sciences.

In 1995, the State Government introduced a policy of having three campuses that should be spread within the three senatorial districts in the State. In view of this policy, three campuses were established to include the main campus in Abraka, Anwai campus in Asaba and Oleh and campuses. Presently, the academic programmes of the university are distributed as follows:

== Campuses ==
=== Abraka Campus ===
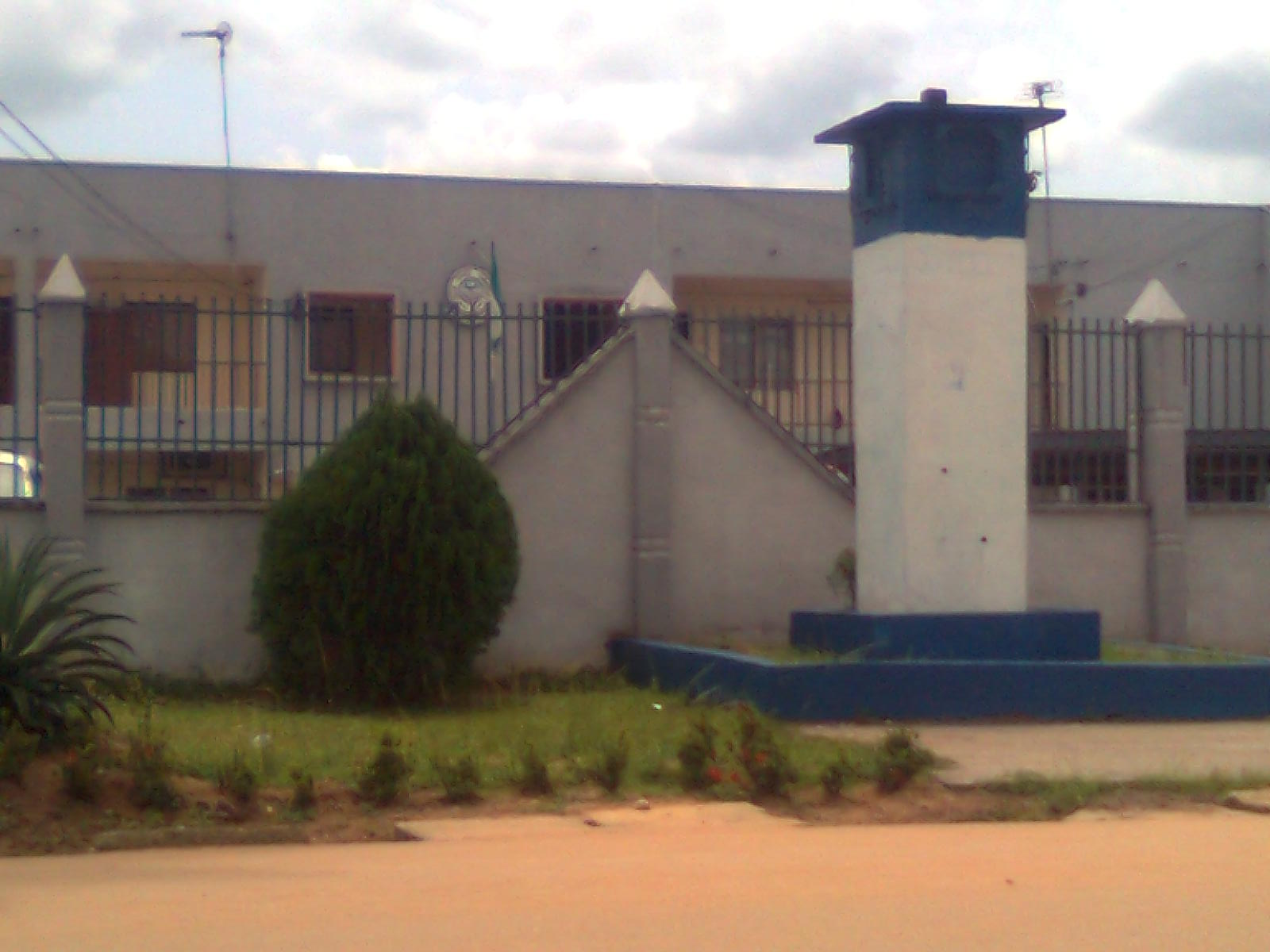
Administrative Structure, Abraka Campus

- Faculty of Education.
- Faculty of Arts.
- Faculty of Sciences.
- Faculty of the Social Sciences.
- Faculty of Management Sciences
- Faculty of Pharmacy.
- College of Basic Medical Sciences.
- College of Health Technology
- Faculty of Agriculture.
- Faculty of Dentistry

=== Oleh Campus ===
- Faculty of Law.
- Faculty of Engineering.

== Affiliated institutions ==
Below is a list of affiliated institutions approved by National Universities Commission (NUC).

- College of Education, Agbor
- College of Education, Warri
- College of Education, Mosogar

== Administration ==
The current principal members of the administration include:

| S/No. | Name | Position |
|---|---|---|
| 1. | Prof. Samuel Ogheneovo Asagba | Vice-Chancellor |
| 2. | Prof (Mrs) Rosemary N. Okoh | Deputy Vice-Chancellor (Administration) |
| 3. | Prof. Ochuko Anomohanran | Deputy Vice-Chancellor (Academic) |
| 4. | Prof. Ello Ebaghare | Provost, Oleh Campus |
| 5. | Prof. E I Odokuma | Provost, College of Health Science |
| 6. | Josephine Onohwakpor | University Librarian |
| 7. | Mrs. Rufina U. Ufiofio | Registrar |
| 8. | Mr. Otimeyin Ekakitie-Omajuwa | Bursar |

== Location ==
The main campus of Delta State University is in Abraka, Delta State. They are also separated into three sites which includes:

SITE 1 - There is nothing much but covers mostly lectures for departments such as Guidance and Counselling, Music, Technical Education and all other sorts.

SITE 2 - which covers a great percentage of administrative work such as the Vice - Chancellor's office, the Admission Office, university library. There are also some academic activities such as learning and others in the SITE. We can also see the school's ICT building which is in charge of the school information and all that concerns ICT.

SITE 3 - Which is concerned with much of the academic work and also hosts the Science Laboratory, Computer Laboratory and most importantly, the Senate Building.

The other campus is in Oleh. The main campus is largely surrounded by the scenic view of the Abraka urban settlement. The university is composed of ten faculties, which include:

- College/Faculty of Basic Medical Sciences
- Faculty of Arts
- Faculty of Education
- Faculty of Science
- Faculty of the Social Sciences
- Faculty of Agriculture
- Faculty of Management Sciences
- Faculty of Environmental Studies
- Faculty of Law
- Faculty of Engineering
- Faculty of Health Technology

== Halls of residence ==
There is a total of sixteen halls of residence in Delta State University, which are spread across the two campuses. Out of the twenty halls of residence, one is meant for post graduate students (which is located in Abraka campus) and the others are for undergraduate students. Abraka and Oleh campus has eight and seven halls of residence, respectively. Most of the halls are meant for female students.

=== Abraka campus halls of residence ===
- Abraka Hall.(male)
- Canon Mason Hall. (male)
- Council Hall. (female)
- Eco Hall.(female)
- Ethiope Hall. (female)
- Medical Hostel.(male and female)
- NDDC Hall.(female)
- Executive Hostel. (male and female)

=== Oleh campus halls of residence ===
- Two Government Hostels. (male)
- Two Government Hostels. (female)
- Isoko Development Venture (IDL) Hostel. (female)
- Women Affairs Hall. (female)
- Brooklyn Hall. (male)

== Students' Union Government ==
The Students' Union Government popularly known as SUG is the students' arm of governance whose affairs are overseen by the Dean of Student's Affairs Division. The Union is headed by a President (usually a male student) and assisted by a vice-president (a female student), with a Secretary General and Directors who head different divisions/units in the students' arm.

The executives have an academic session to serve in their elective positions. The Delta State University, DELSU, Abraka conducted the first ever solely online Students' Union Government election in Nigeria. The election software developed by the university enabled the students to vote online from any location within and outside the university. The students voted using their mobile devices such as smartphones, communication tablets, laptop computers, the results were made visible to any of them who logged on to the voting site and this made the election seamless, peaceful and comfortable.

== Library ==
Delta State University (DELSU), Abraka, commissioned a newly built ultra modern university library in the institution. The Library has a seating capacity of 4,500 persons, a section for phone calls, a relaxation area, an eatery section, places to charge phones, an area where calls can be made, an elevator and a virtual library within and outside the premises.

== Scholarships ==
In addition to University scholarships and other grants, the university has special scholarship schemes and grants to various categories of students.

== Past vice-chancellors ==
- 1992 to 1994: Professor F.M.A. Ukoli, F.A.S.
- 1995 to 1998: Professor Pius O. Sada
- 1998 to 1999: Professor A.E. Ekoko
- 1999 to 2004: Professor Uvie A. Igun
- 2004 to 2009: Professor J.O. Enaohwo
- 2009 to 2014: Professor Eric A. Arubayi
- 2014 to 2019: Professor Victor F. Peretomode
- 2019 to 2024: Professor Andy Egwunyenga
- 2024 to 2029: Professor Samuel Asagba

== Units and divisions ==
- Academic Planning Unit.
- Audit Unit.
- Information and Public Relations Unit.
- Legal Unit.
- Physical Planning Unit.
- Security Unit.
- Sports Division.
- Bursary Department: This department include the following division;
  - Bursar's Office.
  - Treasury Division.
  - Management Division.
  - Final Account Division.
- Registry: This department consist of the following divisions;
  - Admission.
  - Council.
  - Establishments Division.
  - Examinations and Records.
  - Senate Division.
  - Students' Affairs.
- University Health Service Department: This department consist of the following units;
  - Medical Record Unit.
  - Nursing Unit.
  - Laboratory Unit.
  - Public Health Unit.
  - Pharmacy Unit, and
  - X-ray Unit.
- Works and Service Department: This department consist of the following units;
  - Mechanical Unit.
  - Estate Unit.
  - Civil Unit.
  - Electrical Unit.
  - Drivers'Unit.

== Notable alumni ==
- Charity Adule, Nigerian female footballer
- Onos Ariyo, gospel singer
- Bovi, comedian, director, producer, actor, and writer.
- Ayiri Emami, businessman
- Ndidi Emefiele (born 1987), painter
- Oritse Femi, singer-songwriter, performer
- Ayo Makun, Nigerian actor, comedian, radio and T.V presenter, actor, writer, director and master of ceremony.
- Matse Uwatse, radio personality and food blogger
- Uche Mac-Auley, Nigerian actress.
- Kellyrae, musician
