= Halima Abubakar =

Nigerian actress (born 1985)

- Born: 12 June 1985 (age 41); Kano, Nigeria
- Education: Bayero University
- Occupations: Actress CEO, Modehouse Entertainment
- Awards: Best Actress, 2011 Afro Hollywood Awards

Halima Abubakar (born 12 June 1985) is a Nigerian actress. In 2011, she won the Afro Hollywood Best Actress award.

== Personal life ==
Abubakar was born in Kano but is a descent of Kogi. She attended Ideal Primary School in Kano then studied Sociology at Bayero University, Kano.

== Career ==
She began acting in 2001 when she played a minor role in Rejected. Her first lead role was in Gangster Paradise. She is also the CEO of a Modehouse Entertainment, a music label and entertainment management company.

== Filmography ==
- Gangster Paradise (2001)
- Love Is Pain (2004)
- Slip of Fate
- Wicked Lineage (2006)
- Sin No More (2007)
- The Seekers
- Missing Child (2009) as Amara
- Area Mama
- Men in Love (film) (2010)
- Secret Shadows (2010) as Flora
- White Hunters (2011)
- Ladies Gang (2011) as Sandra
- Miss Queen (2012) as Vivian
- The Enemy I See (2012) as Charity
- Jujuwood (2013) as Maggie
- Beyond Disability (2014) as Bisi's Friend
- Royal Switch (2015)
- Okafor's Law (2016) as Cassandra
- Commitment Shy (2016) as Nora
- Kiss and Tell (2018)
- Love Castle (2021) as Show Host
