= Best of Nollywood Awards =

Annual event celebrating the Nigerian movie industry

- Current: 2022 Best of Nollywood Awards
- Awarded for: Outstanding Achievement in Nollywood
- Country: Nigeria
- Presented by: Best of Nollywood Magazine
- First award: 2009
- Website: www.bonawards.com

Best of Nollywood Awards (stylised as BON Awards) is an annual film event presented by Best of Nollywood Magazine, honouring outstanding achievement in the Nigerian Movie Industry. The first edition was held on 6 December 2009, in Ikeja, Lagos State. The 2013 ceremony honouring movies of 2013 was held at Dome, Asaba, Delta State, on 5 December 2013. Governor Emmanuel Uduaghan was the chief host, and the nomination party was held at the State House in Lagos. The red carpet used for the event was aimed to be one of the longest in history.

== Ceremonies ==
- 2009 Best of Nollywood Awards
- 2010 Best of Nollywood Awards
- 2011 Best of Nollywood Awards
- 2012 Best of Nollywood Awards
- 2013 Best of Nollywood Awards
- 2014 Best of Nollywood Awards
- 2015 Best of Nollywood Awards
- 2016 Best of Nollywood Awards
- 2017 Best of Nollywood Awards
- 2018 Best of Nollywood Awards
- 2019 Best of Nollywood Awards
- 2020 Best of Nollywood Awards
- 2021 Best of Nollywood Awards
- 2022 Best of Nollywood Awards

== Categories ==
As of 2013, the BON Awards have approximately 35 categories.

- Best Lead Actor in an English Movie
- Best Lead Actress in an English Movie
- Best Lead Actor in a Yoruba film
- Best Lead Actress in a Yoruba film
- Best Supporting Actor in an English film
- Best Supporting Actress in an English film
- Best Supporting Actor in a Yoruba film
- Best Supporting Actress in a Yoruba film
- Most Promising Act of the Year (male)
- Most Promising Act of the Year (female)
- Best Child Actor (male)
- Best Child Actor (female)
- Comedy of the Year
- Movie with the Best Social Message
- Best Kiss in a Movie
- Best Makeup in a Movie
- Onga Best Use of Nigerian Food in a Movie
- Best Short film of the Year
- Best Use of a Costume in a Movie
- Best Screenplay
- Best Edited Movie
- Best Sound in a Movie
- Best Production Design
- Best Cinematography
- Director of the Year
- Movie of the Year
- Best Special Effects
- Best Actor (Hausa)
- Best Actress (Hausa)
- Best Supporting Actor (Hausa)
- Best Supporting Actress (Hausa)
- Revelation of the Year (Female)
- Revelation of the Year (Male)
- Movie Journalist of the Year
- Marketer of the Year
