= Desmond Elliot =

Nigerian actor, director, and politician

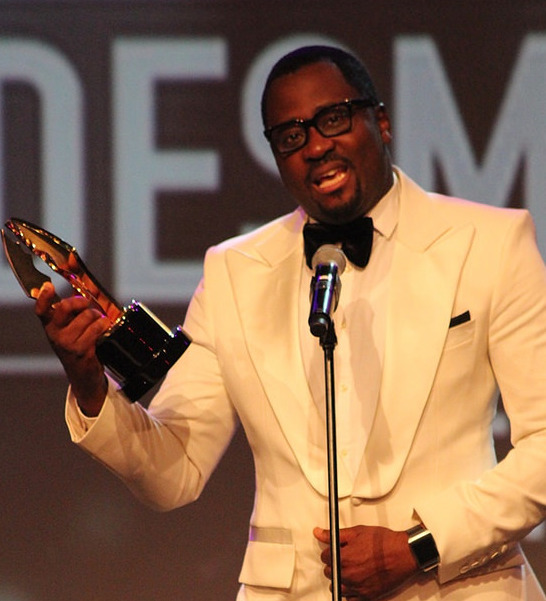
- Elliot at the 2014 Africa Magic Viewers Choice Awards in Lagos

Lagos State House of Assembly, Surulere constituency 1
- Incumbent
- Assumed office 11 April 2015
- Preceded by: Kabiru Lawal

Personal details
- Born: Desmond Oluwashola Elliot; 4 February 1975 (age 51) Lagos, Lagos State, Nigeria
- Party: All Progressives Congress (APC)
- Spouse: Victoria Elliot
- Occupation: Actor, film director, politician

Desmond Oluwashola Elliot (born 4 February 1974) is a Nigerian actor, film director and politician. He was elected as a lawmaker of the Lagos State House of Assembly, Surulere Constituency in the 11 April 2015 Nigerian General Elections. Elliot competed to become the ambassador for the Face of Hope Project, a non-profit combatting illiteracy amongst Nigerian youth.

== Early life ==
Elliot was born to a Yoruba father from Olowogbowo in Lagos Island, Lagos State, Southwest Nigeria and an Igbo mother from Illah in Oshimili North, Delta State, South-South Nigeria. He received his primary education at Air Force Primary School and later attended St John's College, both in Jos. He studied economics at Lagos State University and graduated in 2003.

== Career ==
Elliot was influenced by a friend to become an actor. He started playing roles in soap operas like Everyday People, One Too Much and Saints and Sinners. He is one of Nollywood's leading actors, having appeared in over two hundred films including Men Who Cheat, Yahoo Millionaire and Atlanta. In 2006, he was nominated for the African Movie Academy Award for "Best Actor in a Supporting Role" in the movie "Behind Closed Doors". In 2008, Elliot co-produced and co-directed the movie "Reloaded" which received 3 nominations at the Africa Movie Academy Awards in 2009. In 2009 and 2010, He was nominated for the Best Actor category at the Nigeria Entertainment Awards.

Also in 2010, Elliot competed to become the ambassador for the Face of Hope Project, a "volunteer-based non-profit, non-religious, non-political organization established to give hope to the hopeless", in which he will work toward fixing "child illiteracy in Nigeria and Africa at large" should he emerge. In 2014, he was nominated for the African Movie Academy Award for "Best Actor in a Supporting Role" in the movie "Finding Mercy"

== Politics ==
Elliot declared his intentions in September 2014 to run for Lagos State House of Assembly under the All Progressives Congress. He contested and won the Surulere Constituency on the 11th of April, 2015. Nigerian General Elections. In October 2020, during the End SARS protest, Desmond was heavily criticized for allegedly supporting Anti-Social Media Bill in Nigeria; an allegation he earlier denied when the news first filtered in via social media. In a viral video circulating all over the internet, he was seen vehemently criticizing social media users and influencers and stating that if the Nigerian state doesn't stop social media, social media will destroy the Nigerian state. His comments were not taken lightly by Nigerians on social media and thus the popular Nigerian pidgin slang, na Desmond Elliot cause am, meaning It's Desmond Elliot's fault, was born.

He however came out few days later to apologize. He said “I allowed my emotions get the better of me and for this I apologize to everyone my earlier statements may have hurt. Please, understand that even the best of us makes mistakes. This is why, moving forward, I ask that we all try to engage constructively on the issues that affect all of us. I promise to do the same. The pain that I feel for my constituents, the calls for assistance that I continue to get, and the need to mitigate against further destruction and violence will continue to drive my engagements and my work. I thank you all for expressing your views, and in the future, I promise to be more conscious and aware. Together, we will build a better Nigeria" Desmond Elliot is presently using a third term as state legislator representing Surulere Constituency 1. Although, his nomination by the party (APC) during his two terms in office came unopposed, he faced strong opposition going into the 2023 general elections, as a host of aspirants including Honourable Barakat Odunuga-Bakare, the Special Adviser on Housing to the Lagos State Governor and Fuad Kayode Laguda (who later was elected as a Federal Legislator within the same constituency) declared intention to also vie for the ticket. Through some form of intra-party horse-trading, he eventually got the ticket, paving way for a third term representativeness. On the 20th of May, 2026, Desmond Elliot lost the APC primaries to Honourable Barakat Odunuga-Bakare, polling a total of 270 votes against 11,385 for the eventual winner.

== Personal life ==
Elliot is married and has four children. He is involved in public relations for Globacom.

Desmond Elliot celebrated his 15th wedding anniversary with his wife, Victoria Elliot on 26 December 2018.

== Filmography ==
- Unknown Soja (2024) as Major Ibrahim
- Ill Fated (directed) (2024) as Femi
- Switched-Up (2023) as Barrister Yomi Jayesimi
- Teni's Big Day (directed) (2023)
- Stale (2022) as Abdul
- Without Bounds (2022)
- Treasury (2022) as Chief Alakija
- Miss Bamidele's Girls (2022) as Felix
- Love Castle (2021) as Ayo
- Nobody's Ex (2021) as Ebuka
- Sweet Melony (2020) as Remi
- Memory Lane (2020) as Akin
- Being Annabel (2019) as Maro
- Crazy People (2018)
- Esohe (2017) as Johnny Payne
- Falling (2015 film) (2015)
- Black Val (2015) as Fola
- The Department (film) (2015) as Effiong Akpodigha
- When Love Happens (2014) as Lanre
- 30 Days in Atlanta (2014) as Okiemute
- Okon Goes to School
- Kamara's Tree (2013) as Tejan Kamara
- Finding Mercy 1 & 2 (2013)
- Kiss and Tell (2011 film) (2011) as Bernard
- I'll Take My Chances (2011)
- Bursting Out (film) (2010) as Bernard
- Holding Hope (2010)
- Nollywood Hustlers (2010) as Olumide Sydney Badmus
- Before the Light (2009)
- Edikan
- Uyai (2008)
- Final Tussle (2008) (V)
- Guilty Pleasures (2008) as Mr. Okoro
- Black Night in South America (2007) as Paul
- A Better Place (2007)
- Caught-Up (2007)
- Double Game (2007)
- Fine Things (2007)
- Ghetto Queen (2007)
- Secret Pain (2007) as Kenechukwu
- Wind of Glory (2007) as Clark
- A Time to Love (2007) as Hank
- Yahoo Millionaire (2007) as Jerry
- Put It on Me (2006)
- Asunder (2006)
- Men Who Cheat (2006)
- Behind the Plot (2006)
- Divided Attention (2006)
- Efficacy (2006)
- Ekaette (2006) as Tony
- Extreme Measure (2006) ... Festus
- Final Point (2006)
- The Greatest Sacrifice (2006)
- King of the Town (2006)
- Love Wins (2006) as Austin
- Married to the Enemy (2006)
- My Little Secret (2006)
- My Sister My Love (2006) as Jar
- Naked Sin (2006)
- Romeo (2006)
- Strange Love (2006)
- Supremacy (2006)
- Too Late to Claim (2006)
- Traumatised (2006) as Jide
- Unbreakable Affair (2006) as Lawrence
- Up to Me (2006)
- Without Apology (2006)
- The Wolves (2006) as Eric
- Zoza (2006) as Zoza
- A Night in the Philippines (2005)
- 2 Face (2005)
- Behind Closed Doors (2005)
- The Bet (2005)
- Broadway (2005)
- Destiny's Challenge (2005)
- Flying Without Wings (2005)
- Fools in Love (2005)
- Games Women Play (2005)
- Girls in the Hood (2005)
- Hold Me Down (2005)
- It's Juliet or No One (2005)
- Just Me (2005) as Brume
- The King's Son (2005)
- Knowing You (2005)
- Men Do Cry (2005)
- My Precious Son (2005) as Ben
- My Sister My Child (2005)
- My Sister's Act (2005)
- Now & Forever (2005)
- Orange Groove (2005)
- The Price of Love: Life Is Beautiful (2005)
- Shackles of Death (2005)
- Wedding Gift (2005)
- Wheel of Change (2005)
- Images in the Mirror (2004) .... Deji
- Above Love (2004)
- Atlanta (2004) as Abel
- Big Pretenders (2004)
- Cinderella (2004)
- Danger Signal (2004)
- Deep Loss (2004)
- Died to Save (2004)
- Discord (2004)
- For Real (2004) as Chris
- A Kiss from Rose (2004)
- Lake of Fire (2004) as Brother Emmanuel
- Life in New York (2004)
- Magic Moment (2004)
- Melody of Life (2004) as Martin
- Missing Angel (2004) as Angel
- Passion of Mind (2004)
- Power of Trust (2004)
- Promise & Fail (2004)
- True Romance (2004) as Stanley
- Great Change (2003)
- Magic Love (2003)
- My Faithful Friend (2003)
- Passion & Pain (2003) as Edward
- Tunnel of Love (2003)
- Fire Love (2002)
- Jesu Mushin (2002)
- Infidelity (2000) as Lawyer
- Fishers of Men

== Television ==
- Everyday People (Soap Opera)
- One Too Much (Soap Opera)
- Saints and Sinners (Soap Opera)
- Santalal
- Super Story

== See also ==
- List of Yoruba people
