= Ade Laoye =

Nigerian-American actress

- Born: Dayton, Ohio, United States of America
- Education: Pennsylvania State University
- Occupation: Actress
- Years active: 2006–present
- Notable work: Knocking on Heaven's Door

Ade Laoye is a Nigerian-American actress. She is a graduate of Pennsylvania State University where she studied Theatre Arts.

Ade Laoye first starred in Knocking on Heaven's Door by Emem Isong. Ade also featured in Lunchtime Heroes by Seyi Babatope and in an Africa Magic series, Hush by Oye Agunbiade. Ade Laoye alongside other Nollywood actresses, Kehinde Bankole, Munachi Abii, and Omowumi Dada, have been unveiled as the lead actors in the screen adaptation of Tunde Leye's blog series, Finding Hubby.

Ade Laoye was nominated for a Barrymore Award for Best Ensemble in a Musical she performed in The Arden Theatre Company.

== Early life and education ==
Born into a musical family, Laoye drew her inspiration from musical theatre and movies.

After graduating from The Pennsylvania State University, USA where she studied Theatre Arts, she performed at The Arden Theatre Company and was nominated for a Barrymore Award for Best Ensemble in a musical.

== Career ==
Over the years, Laoye has worked at the Walnut Street Theatre, Playbill Magazine. She got her first professional job at Arden Theatre Company immediately when she finished her first degree. In 2012, she moved to Nigeria where she has featured in several movies and TV series such as Dowry, Retreat, Lunch Time Heroes, HM Travel and Tours, For Colored Girls.

== Filmography ==
- Silence (2024) as Teni Popoola
- The Black Book (2023) as Vic Kalu
- A Naija Christmas (2021) as Kaneng
- Collision Course (2021) as Nneka
- Ayinla (2021) as Jaiye
- Finding Hubby 2 (2021) as Oyin
- Finding Hubby (2020) as Oyin
- Lizard (2020) as Yemi/Mummy
- A second Husband (2020)
- Walking with Shadows (2019) as Nikki
- Oga John (2019) as Alero
- Knockout Blessing (2018) as Blessing
- Castle & Castle (2018) as Morenike Athol-Williams
- You Me Maybe (2017) as Samantha
- The Tribunal (2017)
- Hush (2016) as Oye Agunbiade
- Erased (2015) as Grace
- Lunch Time Heroes (2015)
- Dowry (2014) as Lola
