= Femi Ogunrombi =

Nigerian actor and ethnomusicologist (died 2023)

Papa Ajasco
- Femi Ogunrombi
- Died: 14 January 2023
- Education: Obafemi Awolowo University Ile-Ife
- Occupations: Actor; Ethnomusicologist
- Employer: Wale Adenuga
- Organizations: Wale Adenuga Production; National Troupe of Nigeria; Lagos State Council for Arts and Culture; Ekiti State Council for Arts and Culture
- Known for: Papa Ajasco character
- Television: Papa Ajasco

Femi Ogunrombi (died 14 January 2023) was a Nigerian actor and Ethnomusicologist. He was popularly known as Papa Ajasco in Wale Adenuga's Papa Ajasco and Company comedy movie after Abiodun Ayoyinka pulled out of the comedic series.

== Biography ==
Femi Ogunrombi studied music and drama at Obafemi Awolowo University. During his studies, he established a choral group called The Ayoro Voices which later had radio and TV programmes on BCOS, OGTV and NTA Ibadan. The group that included Ayo Thomas, Jide Ogundipe, Iyabo Omomeji later became the cultural image of OAU in 1980 and 1983. Steven Osazuwa explained that:

Femi Ogunrombi, lived music because the music was his calling. He had unlike his twin brother, switched from the sciences (medical) to study music at the then University of Ife, where he with other talented voices formed the “Ayoro Voices

== Career ==
Ogunrombi joined the National Troupe of Nigeria as music facilitator in 1994. He became the director of music and conducted National Choir in 1998. He was a consultant for Lagos State Council for Arts and Culture and the Ekiti State Council for Arts and Culture in 1999 and 2014 respectively. Ogunrombi assumed the comic role of Papa Ajasco at the popular TV comedy programme of Papa Ajasco and Company in 2006. Simultaneously, he was also the Coordinator of Studies for Adenuga's PEFTI film Institute.

== Death ==
Ogunrombi died on Saturday, 14 January 2023. His death caused a controversy as many media houses were using the picture of the character in the Papa Ajasco series, Richard Abiodun Ayoyinka. The mistaken identity was later clarified by Ayoyinka in a short video clip.
