= Finding Hubby 2 =

2021 Nigerian film

- Directed by: Femi Ogunsanwo
- Written by: Temitope Bolade-Akinbode; Diche Enunwa; Tunde Leye
- Starring: Ade Laoye; Munachi Abii; Kehinde Bankole; Charles Etubiebi; Tina Mba
- Production companies: House Gabriel Studio; TLS Media Place
- Distributed by: Genesis Film Distribution
- Release date: 2021
- Country: Nigeria
- Languages: English; Yoruba; Nigerian Pidgin

Finding Hubby 2 is the 2021 sequel to the Nigerian romantic comedy Finding Hubby starring Ade Laoye, Kehinde Bankole, Muna Abii, and Charles Etubiebi. Based on the blog series of the same name by Tunde Leye who also serves as executive producer, it follows the life of Oyin Clegg who returns to the chaotic world of dating after she stumbles on her fiancé's secret. The movie was released via Netflix on 16 September 2022.

== Plot ==
After realising that she is the wealthy but closeted Yomi Kester-Jacobs' beard, Oyin Clegg is torn between two choices—a prosperous lavender marriage, or the degrading return to singledom in her late 30s. After considering the pros and cons, and despite her former boyfriend Ade begging for a reconciliation, Oyin decides to proceed with the wedding. However, the ceremony is thwarted when her former boss Ossy—now a bank manager—outs Yomi during the banns. His double life now exposed, Yomi cancels the wedding in front of the guests, and a devastated Oyin is abandoned at the altar.

Despite public ridicule—including a Nollywood film parodying her humiliation—Oyin boldly returns to work and discovers she has a secret admirer. She agrees to meet him for a date, only to find he is none other than Ossy, whose advances she had previously turned down. She furiously accuses him of ruining her wedding for his own benefit and refuses his request to become his side chick (Ossy is now married to her best friend Gloria who, unbeknown to Oyin, is in an abusive marriage).

Later that evening with Gloria and her other best friend Toke, Gloria not only reveals the true nature of her marriage but also pleads with Oyin to consider her husband's request, which Oyin heatedly refuses. The argument escalates further when Gloria confesses she had slept with Toke's current boyfriend Olumide whom she had first met during her studies in America. Upon Gloria's arrival home, Ossy physically attacks his pregnant wife, causing her to lose their unborn baby. Oyin and Toke visit her in the hospital, and the three women plot their revenge on Ossy.

Gloria gathers sufficient evidence proving Ossy has secretly defrauded his bank. Simultaneously, Oyin sends Ossy flirtatious texts, arranging for them to meet at her house to fulfil her erotic fantasies and he agrees, not realising he is being set up. On his way to her house, Oyin instructs him to meet her in the living room naked when she is waiting for him in the dark, to which he agrees. He switches on the light and finds himself fully undressed amidst guests at a surprise party where a now-healed Gloria, flanked by Oyin and Toke, reveals incriminating texts and images proving his violence towards his wife. To avoid certain criminal charges, he agrees to sign divorce papers and compensate her financially, but although the friends promise not to shame him via revenge porn, Ossy's images are circulated via social media, causing further disgrace.

At the nightclub where the three friends celebrate Gloria's new-found freedom, Toke announces she is pregnant with her toyboy boyfriend Olumide's baby, but has broken up with him. Toke and Gloria accept Oyin's invitation to her church the next day, and during an after-service meeting with Pastor T, Oyin's ex-boyfriend Akin arrives, once again pleading with her to take him back. She initially refuses, but finally forgives him. The story ends with Oyin and Akin engaged six months later.

== Cast ==
- Ade Laoye as Oyin
- Munachi Abii as Gloria
- Kehinde Bankole as Toke
- Charles Etubiebi as Ossy
- Efa Iwara as Ade
- Paul Utomi as Yomi
- Tina Mba as Oyin's mother
- Tope Tedela as Pastor T
- Damilola Ogunsi as Desmond
- Demi Banwo as Olumide
