= Kehinde Bankole =

Nigerian actress

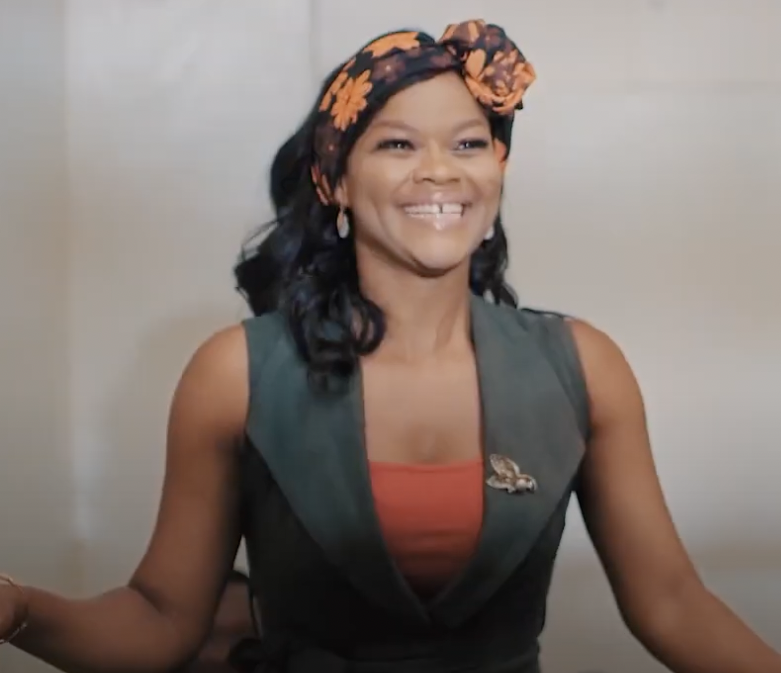
- Born: Kehinde Bankole
- Education: Mass Communication, Olabisi Onabanjo University
- Alma mater: Olabisi Onabanjo University
- Occupations: Actress, model, TV host
- Years active: 2003–present
- Awards: revelation of the year award at 2009 Best of Nollywood Awards

Kehinde Bankole is a Nigerian actress, model, and television host. She made her entertainment debut in Miss Commonwealth Nigeria 2003, then proceeded with MBGN 2004. She was named Revelation of the Year at the 2009 Best of Nollywood Awards, two years after her first screen feature in Wale Adenuga's Super Story.

== Personal life ==
Bankole was born as the fourth child, out of six of architect Babatunde Bankole and Titilayo Bankole, an administrative secretary. She has a twin sister, Taiwo, who also acts occasionally. She completed her primary education at Tunwase Nursery and Primary School, Ikeja, before studying mass communication at Olabisi Onabanjo University but took a break to focus on her modelling career in 2004.

== Career ==
=== Modelling career ===
Bankole first entertainment experience was when she auditioned as a contestant in Miss Commonwealth Nigeria pageant in 2003, although she did not win, she claimed the exposure was all she really wanted as she made the top 10. She also competed in Most Beautiful Girl in Nigeria but could not make the top five list. After the contract of Genevieve Nnaji expired as a Lux ambassador, Kehinde Bankole was chosen along with Sylvia Udeogu and Olaide Olaogun to become the new face of Lux in 2007.

=== Acting ===
Bankole made her acting debut during her tenure as Lux ambassador in the family drama Super Story: Everything it Takes, playing the character Caro. She has also starred in other Wale Adenuga productions, including Papa Ajasco and This Life. On television, she played housewife Kiki Obi in Desperate Housewives Africa, the Nigerian remake of the American series. She featured in the movie Prophetess with Toyin Abraham as well as in October 1 produced by Kunle Afolayan. She played the titular role in Funmilayo Ransom-Kuti. She also played the role of a warrior in Ìyálóde.

=== Talk show host ===
She hosts daytime talk shows including Soul Sisters and African Kitchen.

== Filmography ==
Film and television
Year	Project	Role	Notes
2009	Imala		
2011	The Perfect Church		Film
2011	Two Brides and a Baby	Pewa	Film
2011	The Return of Jenifa	Kenny (cameo)	Film
2011	Ojukoju		Film
2012	The Meeting	Kikelomo	Film
2013	Awakening	Zainab	Film
2013	Façade		Film
2013	Azonto Babes		Film
2014	Render to Caesar		Film
2014	October 1	Miss Tawa	
2015–present	Desperate Housewives Africa	Kiki Obi	TV series 20 episodes
2016–present	Dinner	Lola Coker	
2018	Grace		
2018	No Budget	Lola Balogun	
2018	Bachelor's Eve		
2019	The Set Up	Grace	
2020	Dear Affy	Affy	
2020	Mama Drama	Kemi	Directed by Seyi Babatope
2020	Finding Hubby	Toke	
2020	Abeke	Abeke	
2020	Listening Ears	Abike	
2021	Love Castle	Adetutu	Drama
2021	Country Hard	Dinma	
2022	Blood Sisters	Olayinka Ademola	TV mini series 4 episodes
2022	Dirty Sunday	Yinka	
2022	The Set Up 2	Grace	Crime / drama
2022	Finding Hubby 2	Toke	
2022	Rebirth		Drama
2022	Sistá	Sistá	
2023	Kizazi Moto: Generation Fire	Moremi (voice)	Episode: "Moremi"
2023	Just Us Girls	Mummy Ife	TV series
2023	Lugard		
2023	Atunwa		
2023	Holy Heist	Tracy	
2023	Adire	Adire	
2024	Iwaju	Mama Kole	TV series
2024	Alagbede(Blacksmith)		
2024	Funmilayo Ransome-Kuti	Funmilayo Ransome-Kuti	
2024	Offshoot	Modesire Mbakwe	
2025	The Party		TV series
2025	Ìyálóde	Arogba	Film

== Awards and nominations ==
Year	Event	Prize	Film	Result	Ref
2009	Best of Nollywood Awards	Revelation of The Year		Won	
2010	Best of Nollywood Awards	Best Indigenous Actress in a Lead Role (Yoruba)	Imala	Nominated	
2012	Best of Nollywood Awards	Best Supporting Actress in a Yoruba Film	Ojukoju	Nominated	
2014	ELOY Awards	TV Actress of the Year (Super Story)	—N/a	Nominated	
2015	Africa Magic Viewers' Choice Awards	Best Actress in Drama	October 1	Won	
2020	2020 Best of Nollywood Awards	Best Actress in a Lead Role –English	Dear Affy	Nominated	
2021	Best of Nollywood Awards	Best Actress in a Lead Role –Yoruba	Abeke	Nominated	
2021	Abuja International Film Festival	Outstanding Female Actor	Love Castle	Nominated	
2022	Africa Magic Viewers' Choice Awards	Best Actress in a Drama	Dear Affy	Nominated	
2024	Africa Magic Viewers' Choice Awards	Best Lead Actress	Adire	Won	
