= Inline =

Inline or In Line may refer to:

- Inline citation (here meaning "within a line of text")
- Inline or Straight engine
- Inline hockey
- Inline skating
- In Line (album), a 1983 album by Bill Frisell
- In Line (film), a 2017 Nigerian drama film

== Computing ==
- Inline assembler
- Inline expansion
- Inline function in C and C++
- Posting style § Interleaved style or Inline reply
- HTML element § Inline elements or Inline tag
