= Joy Grant-Ekong =

Nigerian actress and director

- Born: Joy Aiyegbeni; Lagos State, Nigeria
- Citizenship: Nigeria
- Occupations: Film producer; Actress
- Years active: 2008–present
- Notable work: Mama Drama; One Too Many

Joy Grant-Ekong formerly known as Joy Aiyegbeni is a Nigerian television and film producer, director, script supervisor and a production consultant, known for her 2020 drama film Mama Drama and One Too Many.

== Early life ==
Joy Grant-Ekong was born in Lagos, Nigeria. She started production in 2003 when she joined the Ojo Ladipo Theatre troop and then moved to Wale Adenuga Productions as a continuity manager. Joy Grant-Ekong joined the M-Net's multicamera daily soap opera Tinsel from the second season and became the head of the department for director's assistants to the fourth season.

== Career ==
In 2016, she produced a movie titled Babysitting Ejiro, an M-Net movie by Victor Sanchez Aghahowa, and a movie titled InLine directed by Tope Oshin, which was aired in cinemas nationwide in 2017. Joy Grant-Ekong produced a feature-length film Mama Drama and Echoes in 2019. In 2020, she produced Hell Ride, which won Best First feature international at the 2022 Toronto International Nollywood Film Festival (TINFF). In 2020, she was named among movie producers shaping the Nigerian film industry by Vanguard. In 2021, she produced One Too Many.

== Filmography ==
Year	Title	Role		Ref
Year	Title	Director	Producer	Ref
2016	Baby-sitting Ejiro	No	Yes	
2017	Inline	No	Yes	
2019	Echoes	No	Yes	
2019	Deceived	No	Yes	
2020	Hell Ride	No	Yes	
2020	Mama Drama	No	Yes	
2022	One Too Many	No	Yes	
2023	Easily Broken	Yes	Yes	

== Awards and nominations ==
Year	Award	Category	Film	Result	Ref
2017	Back in the box film festival, California	Best Feature Length Film	Inline	Won	
2022	Zuma Film Festival	Best Picture	Hell Ride	Won	
2022	Toronto International Nollywood Film Festival (TINFF)	Best First feature international	Hell Ride	Won	
