= Taste of Love =

Taste of Love may refer to:

- Taste of Love (Nigerian TV series), 2014–16 drama series
- Taste of Love (Singaporean TV series), 2008 drama series
- Taste of Love (South Korean TV series), 2018–19 reality show
- Taste of Love (Taiwanese TV series), 2015–16 drama series
- Taste of Love (EP), 2021 EP by Twice

== See also ==
- Love Clinic (Korean: 연애의 맛; lit. 'The Taste of Love'), a 2015 South Korean film
- "First Taste of Love", a 1960 song by Ben E. King
- "Need a Little Taste of Love", from the 2007 album The Very Best of The Doobie Brothers
- Dolunay (2017) (entitled Taste of Love in the Philippines), a 2017 Turkish drama series
