= 5ive (disambiguation) =

5ive, or Five, is a British boy band.

5ive may also refer to:

- Five (Five album), 1998
- 5ive (American band), an instrumental band from Boston
- "5ive", a song by Medicine from Shot Forth Self Living
- 5ive (web series), a 2016 Nigerian series
- The 5ive, a BET television show
- 5ive (Davido album), 2025

== See also ==
- 5 (disambiguation)
- The Five (disambiguation)
