= Fine Wine (film) =

2021 Nigerian romantic comedy film by Seyi Babatope

- Directed by: Seyi Babatope
- Written by: Temitope Akinbode; Diche Enunwa
- Produced by: Neville Sajere; Patrick Uzoh
- Starring: Richard Mofe-Damijo; Ego Nwosu; Zainab Balogun; Nse Ikpe-Etim
- Production company: Nevadabridge Productions
- Release date: 12 February 2021
- Country: Nigeria
- Language: English
- Box office: ₦24.2 million

Fine Wine is a 2021 Nigerian romantic comedy film directed by Seyi Babatope and written by Temitope Akinbode and Diche Enunwa. The film stars Richard Mofe-Damijo, Ego Nwosu, Zainab Balogun, Nse Ikpe-Etim in the lead roles. The film had its theatrical release on 12 February 2021 on the eve of Valentine's weekend.

== Plot ==
Seye George, a divorced billionaire with two adult children—socialite/events manager Temi and London-based investment banker Sammy—is named Forbes Africa's Top African Businessman. To finance his newest venture—a winery—George applies for a loan with a bank where Tunji, an ambitious but toxic accounts officer, is supervisor. Tunji's girlfriend Kaima is a corper and aspiring banker whose tenure at the bank is almost complete but her future uncertain, as is her relationship with Tunji who hardly appreciates her.

Kaima is furious when Tunji cancels their date as he is busy running work-related errands, but she agrees to meet him in a high-end restaurant where he runs late. A frustrated Kaima waits until George sits at her table, assuming she is the reporter who has arranged to meet him. Kaima mistakenly believes he is making a pass at her, and chastises him before departing, leaving George stunned. Tunji suddenly arrives with documents for George to sign, and Kaima realises she has made a mistake, which infuriates Tunji who orders her to apologise.

Kaima approaches George at his workplace with a bottle of wine as a peace offering; he accepts her apology and invites her out to lunch where they discuss her career. At the bank, Kaima's position is retained after George pulls in a favour with the bank manager, but Tunji's job is threatened after a transaction error. He asks his girlfriend to convince George to sign new documents, and she finds him ill with the flu at his residence but offers to make her mother's medicinal peppersoup which quickly helps him recover. To show his gratitude, George invites Kaima to dinner at his home, where they taste wine from his winery.

Tunji grows suspicious of Kaima's friendship with the considerably older George and accuses her of cheating on him which she denies. However, Kaima accepts George's invitation to celebrate her birthday on a yacht, not realising a spy has taken photos of the pair. Upon her arrival home, she discovers Tunji has thrown her an impromptu birthday party after implying he had forgotten, and he proposes in front of their guests, which she halfheartedly accepts. Tunji is enraged when photos of her and George on the yacht are subsequently leaked, but Kaima's mother begs him not to break off the engagement.

Upon realising the egocentric Tunji would never turn a new leaf after he delivers yet another put-down, Kaima dumps him publicly, stating George is more of a gentleman than he would ever be, and Kaima's sister Kamsi reveals Tunji had indeed forgotten Kaima's birthday until she reminded him. However, Kaima remains uncertain of a future with George, especially after his ex-wife Ame warns her to keep her distance, until George reminds Ame she had left him for a more prosperous man-years before George acquired his own wealth, making her the actual gold-digger. He warns his ex to permanently stay out of his affairs, or he would cut her off financially, to which she agrees.

Kaima, who has resigned herself to losing George forever, is surprised to find him pulling up to her house with Temi. It is here Kaima's friend Angela confesses to releasing footage of her breakup with Tunji on social media which Temi subsequently showed her father, confirming Kaima's true feelings. George asks Kaima again what she wants for her birthday, to which she replies "You".

== Cast ==
- Richard Mofe-Damijo as George
- Ego Nwosu as Kaima
- Nse Ikpe-Etim as Ame
- Ademola Adedoyin as Tunji
- Belinda Effah as Angela
- Zainab Balogun as Temi
- Tina Mba as Kaima's mother
- Keppy Ekpenyong as Akin
- Segun Arinze as a bank manager
- Bofie Itombra as Kamsi
- Joy Nmezi as Chief Nkem
- Kameel Audu as Andrew
- Adesina McCoy Babalola as George's driver
- Baaj Adebule as Sammy
- Cookie Ejiogu as Angela's husband
- Georgette Monnou as Forbes reporter
