= Postcards (2024 TV series) =

2024 Nigerian-Indian TV series

- Written by: Ekenem Mowah-Eboh; TigerFireRose
- Directed by: Hamisha Daryani Ahuja
- Starring: Sola Sobowale; Richard Mofe Damijo; Tobi Bakre; Rajniesh Duggal; Rahama Sadau; Rio Kapadia; Nancy Isime
- Music by: Prajatantra
- Countries of origin: Nigeria; India
- Original languages: English; Nigerian Pidgin; Yoruba; Hindi

Production
- Producer: Hamisha Daryani Ahuja
- Cinematography: Krishna Ramanan
- Editor: Abhishek Ojha

Original release
- Network: Netflix
- Release: 3 May 2024

Postcards is a 2024 Nigerian-Indian Netflix series created by Hamisha Daryani Ahuja. Filmed in Lagos and Mumbai, the series is a cross-cultural venture between Nollywood and Bollywood and stars performers from both industries including Sola Sobowale, Richard Mofe Damijo, Tobi Bakre, Rahama Sadau, Rajneesh Duggal, and Nancy Isime.

Postcards is Ahuja's first major production since 2021's Namaste Wahala, and follows the lives of four Nigerians who discover love, acceptance, and prosperity in India after embarking on individual journeys of self-discovery whilst facing their trials and tribulations.

== Plot ==
Postcards follows the lives of four Nigerians in India. They are:

- Bunmi: A businesswoman and socialite who has lived a fulfilling life since her husband's death twenty years prior, but despite her status on the Eko party circuit, she leads a lonely existence. After a fibroids diagnosis, she flies to Mumbai where she befriends Siddharth, an Indian surgeon. Fearing she will die in surgery, Bunmi yearns to make peace with Yemi, her estranged son with no solid career goals. Unbeknown to her, an Indian film producer has signed Yemi to appear in a Bollywood series after discovering his talent on video, and despite her close bond with Siddharth, Bunmi spends days pining for her only child.
- Zainab: Siddharth's Nigerian wife, who has resolved never to have children, a decision her husband initially supported, but his change of heart causes conflict in their marriage. Despite her mother-in-law's disappointment and her friend Isioma's intervention, Zainab remains resolute in her stance, citing financial strain, career restraints, and societal prejudice against mixed-race children as her reasons. Trouble ensues when Zainab suspects Siddharth is having an affair with Kareena, his flirtatious fellow doctor whom he confides in during his marriage crisis. Zainab—an old acquaintance of Bunmi's—soon discovers she is pregnant, and is contemplating an abortion without Siddharth's knowledge.
- Olumide: Bunmi's Mumbai-based brother, dedicated solely to his business, leaving no time for family or leisure (he puts Bunmi in a hotel as opposed to accommodating her within his household). Olumide's only confidant, his accountant Kabir, who constantly berates his bachelor lifestyle, escorts him to a property viewing where they spot Olumide's former love Rekha who had turned down his proposal years ago due to her parents' disapproval of interracial marriage, leaving him heartbroken. He is further troubled when her daughter, Leila, informs him that her mother has early onset Alzheimer's, and no longer remembers him. With his 60th birthday approaching, the surly Olumide realises that family is more valuable than wealth, and invites Bunmi to stay at his house following her successful surgery.
- Yemi: Bunmi's son who travels to Mumbai. Despite running into a series of unfortunate events in Mumbai—including falling victim to an accommodation scam, and bullying from local actor Rommy—Bunmi's son, rises through the ranks to become a principal dancer in the Bollywood production, but soon comes to blows with Ronny on-set. Both their roles are on the line, but other cast members—including Aarti, an actress Yemi has befriended—confirm Ronny's bullying and the latter is dismissed. Yemi is delighted when he is offered a supporting role in an international series, but his joy is short-lived when his manager, Bolu, calls from Nigeria to inform him of his mother's surgery. Filled with remorse at not contacting Bunmi earlier, Yemi resolves to become a better son.

The series ends with Olumide celebrating his 60th birthday. Kabir is unable to attend, but Bunmi—who has invited Siddharth and Zainab—is reunited with Yemi. Both mother and son resolve their differences (Bunmi had objected to his decision not to pursue further education, while Yemi had viewed her as unsupportive); Olumide apologises to Zainab for his own lack of support when she first relocated to India; Yemi—now his uncle's heir—agrees to enrol in college whilst pursuing his passion in entertainment, and Zainab—who has decided against the abortion—announces her pregnancy.

== Cast ==
- Sola Sobowale as Olubunmi (Bunmi)
- Richard Mofe Damijo as Olumide
- Tobi Bakre as Yemi
- Rajneesh Duggal as Dr. Siddharth
- Rahama Sadau as Zainab
- Rio Kapaola as Kabir
- Nancy Isime as Isioma
- Lekha Prajapati as Kareena
- Chirag Bajaj as Ronny
- Gurleen Grewal as Aarti
- Ibrahim Suleman as Bolu
- Tina Mba as party guest
- Hamisha Daryani Ahuja as film producer

== Reception ==
Postcards received mixed to negative reviews.
