= Asian Nigerian =

Asian Nigerians are Nigerian citizens whose ancestry lies within the continent of Asia. It also refers to Asian-born persons currently living in Nigeria. By mid-2008, Filipino residents in the country had increased to an estimated 4,500, up from 3,790 in December 2005. There is a large population of Chinese people in Nigeria which comprise Chinese expatriates and descendants born in Nigeria with Chinese ancestry. As at 2012, there are approximately 20,000 Chinese in Nigeria.

== Asian immigration to Nigeria ==
In 1930, colonial Nigeria's census showed four Chinese immigrants residing there. Hong Kong investors started opening factories in Nigeria as early as the 1950s. By 1965 there were perhaps 200 Chinese people in the country. By 1999, that number had grown to 5,800, including 630 from Taiwan and 1,050 from Hong Kong. Filipinos arrived in Nigeria as early as the 1970s; the Philippine Barangay Society of Nigeria was founded in 1973 in an effort to coordinate the various Filipino community organisations that had already sprouted up around the country.

== Notable people ==
- Brian Fok, footballer
- Hamisha Daryani Ahuja, actress, producer, director and businesswoman
- Sunil Vaswani, businessman
- Ruby Hammer, makeup artist

== See also ==
- Nigerian people
- Chinese diaspora
- Asia Town
