= Papa Ajasco =

Nigerian family television sitcom

- Also known as: Papa Ajasco and Company
- Genre: Comedy
- Written by: Wale Adenuga
- Starring: Richard Abiodun Ayoyinka; Kayode Olaseinde; Opombo Lily; Frank Donga; Eniola Badmus; Sikiratu Sindodo; Tayo Amokade; Olayinka Garfus Olukunga
- Country of origin: Nigeria
- Original language: English

Production
- Executive producer: Wale Adenuga
- Production location: Nigeria
- Running time: 40 minutes
- Production company: Wale Adenuga Production

Original release
- Network: WAP TV; NTA; AIT
- Release: 1996 – present

Related
- Super Story

Papa Ajasco and Company (formerly The Ajasco Family) is a Nigerian family television sitcom created by Wale Adenuga in 1996. The show is a spin-off of a feature film of the same title produced by Wale Adenuga in 1984, which in turn is based on the comic Ikebe Super. The story revolves around the Ajasco family and their comedic interpretations of major societal issues. The main characters include promiscuous patriarch Papa Ajasco, his long-suffering wife Mama Ajasco, their mischievous son Bobo Ajasco, local playboy Boy Alinco, promiscuous gold-digger Miss Pepeiye, and illiterate ne'er-do-wells Pa James and Pa Jimoh. At its prime, Papa Ajasco was widely considered to be Nigeria's most watched comedy series and was viewed weekly in twelve African countries.

== Background ==
Adenuga released the Papa Ajasco movie in 1983, one of Golden Age pre-Nollywood productions. He stated in an interview that the title character was motivated from the lead role in Ikebe Super. Adenuga began producing and airing the television series as "The Ajasco Family" on AIT in 1996 before it was later renamed Papa Ajasco.

== Character descriptions ==
- Papa Ajasco: A promiscuous bald man who often taps his head when astonished at an event. He was played by Abiodun Ayoyinka, and later Femi Ogunrombi.
- Mama Ajasco: The long-suffering wife of Papa Ajasco. She was played by Iyabo Momoh and later Moji Oyetayo.
- Pa James: An elderly numbskull who usually expresses himself in an unintelligible manner. Unlike the other characters, he does not appear in the comic, but he was specifically created for the series to avoid offending Muslims who objected to Pa Jimoh's antics. Pa James was played by Kayode Olaseinde.
- Boy Alinco: A narcissistic young man with a signature mode of walking and talking. In the comic he wears an extended pompadour (later a flattop), but is completely bald in the series. Boy Alinco was played by Bayo Bankole and later Victor Oyebode.
- Miss Pepeiye: A materialistic young lady who pursues wealthy men for monetary benefits. In the comic, Pepeiye wears her hair in a quiff but has a variety of styles in the series.
- Bobo Ajasco: The mischievous son of Papa and Mama Ajasco. He is often seen wearing a baseball cap with a long peak (similar to Boy Alinco's elongated pompadour), as does his comic version. He has made appearances in the series Binta, My Daughter where he was the title character's friend, and also had his own strip in the comic's sister publication Binta.
- Pa Jimoh (The Ajasco Family only): A friend of the Ajascos, Pa Jimoh is an illiterate simpleton whose lack of sense has caused conflict between the other characters and himself. Although he identifies as a Muslim, albeit secular, he is also a compulsive alcoholic. In the series he is shown with hair, whereas the comic version of himself is completely bald while his physique is almost skeletal. Pa Jimoh was played by Chris Erakpotobor; the character was rested after Erakpotobor's death in 2000.

== Reception ==
Papa Ajasco television series is widely watched across families in Nigeria. In 2010, it debuted in Ghana through Ghana Television and was reputed to being the "best comedy on television" in the country. It also won Kwame Nkrumah Leadership Award in Accra. A survey conducted by Pulse Nigeria revealed that "Papa Ajasco" character was the most loved, with 29.2% of the votes, closely followed by "Boy Alinco" and "Pa James". Papa Ajasco is watched weekly across twenty terrestrial stations in Nigeria and in eleven African countries including Kenya, Tanzania, Uganda and Guinea. In 2013, several additions were made to the cast of new episodes including Femi Brainard, Niyi Johnson and Henrietta Kosoko
