= Olaide Olaogun =

Nigerian actor and model

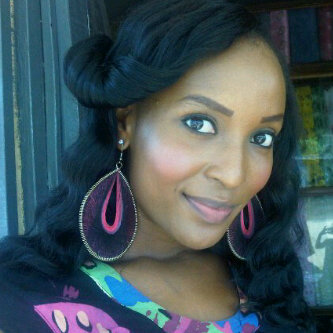
- Born: 9 July 1986 (age 39); Lagos
- Other names: Olaide Olaogun Emmanuel
- Education: African Church Model College, Lagos State University
- Occupations: actress, model and presenter
- Known for: Acting
- Children: one (2016)

Olaide Olaogun (born 9 July 1986), also known as Olaide Omolola Olaogun Emmanuel, is a Nigerian film actor and model. She was formerly a Lux ambassador.

== Early life and education ==
Olaogun was born in Lagos on 9 July 1986. She attended African Church Model College and later graduated with a degree in English from the University of Lagos.

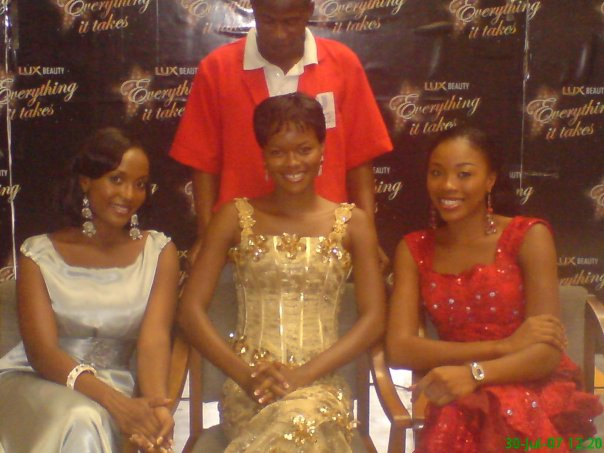
The new faces of Lux in 2007

== Career ==
She gained recognition in Nigeria and Ghana after presenting Soul Sisters, a television programme by Wale Adenuga, and for her appearance in the Yoruba series Super Story. She succeeded Genevieve Nnaji as the face of Lux in its advertising campaigns in 2007 and continued in the role until 2009. She was also a brand ambassador for Diva hair extension, Fuman juice and the United Bank for Africa (UBA).

== Personal life ==
She married Babatunde Ojora Emmanuel and they had a child in 2016.

== Filmography ==
Year	Film	Role	Notes
2005	Omoye	Racheal	
2005	A New Song	Juliet	
2006	Elulu Tafajo	Tayo	
2006	Lion of Mogun		Série télé
2006	Odu		
2006	Iyawo Afoju		
2007	Everything It Takes		
2007	Elerin Eye	Mopelola	
2008	Tinsel		
2008	Eleburu Ike		
2009	Atehinbo		
2009	The Perfect Church		
2010	Hands of a Stranger	Tokunbo Babs Oshodi	
2010	The Promise	Ego	
2011	Obi Eni		
2011	Valentine	Rose	
2013	Memuna Gbagi		

== See also ==
- List of Yoruba people
- List of Nigerian actresses
