= Temitope Bolade Akinbode =

Nigerian screenwriter

- Citizenship: Nigerian
- Occupations: Screenwriter, film producer, director

Temitope Bolade Akinbode is a Nigerian screenwriter, film director and producer.

== Career ==
Akinbode and Diche Enunwa started Writers Ink Concepts in 2015 and have since co-written screenplays for movies including Namaste Wahala, a Netflix original. They were jointly nominated for Best Comedy Writer in the 2015 Africa Magic Viewers Choice Awards for ...When Love Happens.

== Filmography ==
Below are some of the films Akinbode has written or cowritten.

Year	Title	Role	Notes	Ref
2014	...When Love Happens	Co writer	Received nominations at the 2015 Africa Magic Viewers Choice Awards in three categories	
2017	In Line	Co writer		
2020	Namaste Wahala	Co writer	Released as a global Netflix original on 14 February 2021	
2020	Dear Affy	Co writer		
2020	Mama Drama	Co writer		
2020	Finding Hubby	Co writer		
2021	Finding Hubby 2	Co writer		
2021	Sanitation Day	Co writer	Released on Netflix on 21 July 2021	
2021	Fine Wine	Co writer		
2023	Offshoot	Co writer		
2024	On the Edge	Co producer, director	Premiered on Amazon Prime Video	
2024	Wedding Night Blues	Director		
