= Love Happens =

Love Happens may refer to:

- Love Happens (1999 film), an American romantic comedy film starring Megyn Price and Ken Marino
- Love Happens (2009 film), an American romantic drama film starring Aaron Eckhart and Jennifer Aniston
- ...When Love Happens, a 2014 Nigerian romantic comedy film
