= Enunwa =

Enunwa is a surname. Notable people with the name include:

- Diche Enunwa, Nigerian screenwriter
- Quincy Enunwa, American football player
