= Makida Moka =

Egyptian-born Nigerian actress and model

- Born: 4 January 1992 (age 34); Cairo, Egypt
- Education: University of Benin
- Occupations: Actress and Model
- Notable work: Banana Island Ghost
- Television: Gidi Up

Makida Moka (born 4 January 1992) is an Egyptian-born Nigerian actress and model. She starred as Monye in the 2014 TV series Gidi Up, and played a rape victim in Emem Isong's 2015 drama film Code of Silence.

== Early life and career ==
Moka was born in Cairo, Egypt to a Nigerian mother and father of Nigerian descent from Jamaica. She attended primary and secondary school in Lagos, and then enrolled at the University of Benin. She had aspirations to become a geologist, working for an oil company. Despite not being tall, she fell into modelling, when she won the inaugural "Face of Sleek Nigeria" competition in 2009. She has received attention in African media outlets for her fashion sense. As a model she is a brand ambassador for Frankie and Co.

== Film career ==
In 2015, Moka portrayed a gang-rape victim in Code of Silence, who is raped by a local politician and his aide. She found shooting the picture an "intense" experience, which traumatised her to the point that she was often in tears after scenes were cut. In 2016, Moka's starring role in Taste of Love, an African telenova being showed weekly on Africa Magic, Silverbird Television and Africa Independent Television got her a nomination for "best lead actress" at the 2016 Nigerian Broadcasters Merit Awards.

In 2017, Moka played "Melanie" in the crime-comedy series Inspector K; her character in the series was a young social media enthusiast who became a victim of fake information on the internet amidst a homicide. However, the libelous information from the blogger led to increased digital audience to her comfort. The web series received mixed to negative reviews, with Pulse calling it "unfunny", "stressful to watch" and a "disappointing whudunit". It also criticized the acting, production, dialogue and plotting. It got a 50% rating from True Nollywood Stories, who acknowledged the cinematography and soundtrack as impressive. Culture Custodian titled it review "Inspector K Pays Homage To Social Media Yet Falls Flat", with Xplore Nollywood describing the final episode as surprising. She also acted as an Indian Ninja in the supernatural romantic comedy, Banana Island Ghost. Her character was later shown to be having an identity crisis in her complexion and descent.

== Filmography ==
- Banana Island Ghost (2017) as Indian Ninja
- Code of Silence (2015)
- Gidi Up (2013) as Monye (with OC Ukeje)
- Taste of Love (2014) as Hadiza Musa-Philips (with Blossom Chukwujekwu)
- Inspector K

== See also ==
- List of Nigerian actors
