= Abasi Ene-Obong =

Nigerian biomedical scientist and entrepreneur

Dr. Abasi Ene-Obong
- Born: 20 June 1985 (age 41); Calabar, Nigeria
- Education: Imperial College London; Keck Graduate Institute; Barts
- Occupation: Business executive
- Known for: Biotechnology
- Notable work: CEO at 54gene
- Title: Founder and CEO at Syndicate Bio
- Spouse: Ini Dima-Okojie (m. 2022)
- Father: Ene-Obong Effiom Ene-Obong

Abasi Ene-Obong (born 20 June 1985) is a Nigerian biomedical scientist and entrepreneur. Abasi holds a master's degree in human molecular genetics from Imperial College London and a PhD in Cancer Biology from Barts and The London School of Medicine and Dentistry in England. Since September 2023, he is the founder and CEO of Syndicate Bio, a health technology company driving genomics and precision medicine initiatives in global healthcare. Prior to this, since 2019, Abasi served as the co-founder and CEO at 54Gene Inc, a defunct Nigerian health and biotech firm specialized in African genomics which he grew to a valuation of nearly $200m before stepping down in October 2022.

== Biography ==
Abasi was born on 20 June 1985, to Prof Mrs Henrietta Nkechi Ene-obong and late Prof. Ene-Obong Effiom Ene-Obong, he was raised in Nsukka, Nigeria. Both parents were/ are members of the Nigerian Academy of Science. His father served as vice chancellor at University of Cross River State, and a traditional ruler in Calabar among others.

In 2003, Abasi attended his undergraduate studies at University of Calabar, Nigeria where he obtained a Bachelor of Sciences in Genetics and Biotechnology in 2007. Subsequently, he enrolled at Imperial College London, UK to pursue a post-graduate degree, he graduated with master's degree in human molecular genetics. Since 2013, Abasi holds a PhD in Cancer Biology from Barts and The London School of Medicine and Dentistry in England. Abasi further enrolled at Keck Graduate Institute, a member of the Claremont Colleges, U.S to pursue another post graduate degree, he graduated with master's in business management in 2014.

== Career ==
Since 2009, Abasi was a researcher, working at King's College London until 2010, and Barts Cancer Institute until 2013. He is published in some of the world's scientific journals such as Gastroenterology, Cell, and Nature. In 2013, he published in Gastroenterology Journal a paper on pancreatic cancer immunology. In 2021, Abasi was invited by Nature Biotech, alongside Bill Gates, Jennifer Doudna, and others to co-author the "Voices of biotech" issue. From 2013 to 2014, Abasi served as a consultant for Panasonic and Gilead Sciences. Between 2014 and 2015, Abasi was a research director and consultant at IMS Health (now known as IQVIA), based in the U.S. Subsequently, he became a PricewaterhouseCoopers (PwC) senior associate and healthcare industry advisor, based in the U.S, until August 2016. In 2017, Abasi spent months as a Lead Consultant at Pathfinder International for Nigeria's Strategic Health Development Plan, based in Nigeria.

== Business career ==
=== 54Gene ===
In 2019, Abasi founded 54gene in Nigeria along with Ogochukwu Osifo, Damilola Oni, and Gatumi Aliyu, to address the neglect of African natives in global genomics research by setting out the authoritative biobank of the African genome among other initiatives. He served as the CEO of 54gene until October 2022. In 2020, Abasi and his team raised a $15 million Series A round led by Adjuvant Capital to scale research operations and clinical programs. Backed by notable investors including Y Combinator, in two years they raised $45 million in three funding rounds to implement in African genomics, considered the first of its kind in Africa. In September 2020, Abasi joined the Endeavor Entrepreneur global network, 54gene joined 10 other Endeavor Entrepreneur-led companies in Nigeria, and over 1,300 in Endeavor's 37 markets across Africa, Latin America, Asia, Europe and North America.

During the COVID-19 pandemic, 54gene built resources around COVID-19 testing, setting up testing labs and mobile labs in Nigeria. They were at some point one of Nigeria's largest providers of COVID testing. In August 2022, with the significant decline in COVID-19 tests, the 54gene laid off 30% of its workforce, many company employees were recruited in relation to COVID-19 operations. In October 2022, Abasi resigned from CEO position and was replaced by Teresia L. Bost as interim CEO.

As of October 2023, the company was in liquidation.

=== Syndicate Bio ===
In September 2023, Abasi launched Syndicate Bio, a health technology company driving genomics and precision medicine initiatives across the world's most diverse regions, starting in Africa to bridge the gap in global healthcare. Through Syndicate Bio, Abasi uses partnerships with governments, pharma companies, academia and other stakeholders to drive local precision medicine impact. In October 2023, Syndicate Bio announced the signing of MoU with the Nigerian Institute of Medical Research (NIMR). In April 2024, Sophia Genetics and Syndicate Bio announced a collaboration to introduce comprehensive genomic profiling and liquid biopsy services on an unprecedented scale across Africa.

== Scientific contributions with 54gene ==
In 2019, Abasi through 54gene started developing the pan-African DNA biobank, the first of its kind which collected above 300,000 unique human samples and corresponding genomic data by 2022. Abasi through 54gene created the African Center for Translational Genomics (ACTG). The ACTG was launched as a Non-profit organization to harness translational genetic research across Africa by providing grants, fellowships, internships, and training to medical students and researchers. In February 2020, Abasi led 54gene to team up with Nigerian scientists to launch a study investigating genetic causes of non-communicable diseases in Nigeria.

During COVID-19 pandemic, Abasi through 54gene raised Nigeria's COVID-19 testing capacity. In March 2020, he launched a $500,000 fund to tackle COVID-19 testing challenges faced in Nigeria, 54gene opened the fund by donating $150,000 within 24 hours, he had secured an additional of $350,000 from partners, including Union Bank. Since April 2020, 54gene started launching mobile laboratories in Nigeria. The mobile labs were fully kitted container structures designed to reduce the logistical challenges involved in shipping samples to another location for processing.

== Memberships ==
- Society for Family Health Nigeria, Member of the Board of Trustees (2021–present).
- International Cancer Coalition, Member (2022–present).
- Bloomberg New Economy forum on Health, Member (2022–present).

== Recognitions ==
2019: One of the 30 most innovative entrepreneurs of the year in Africa by Quartz.

2020: Fortune's 40 under 40 most influential people in healthcare.

2020: Nigeria Hero in the fight against COVID-19 by This Day.

2021: One of the 100 most influential young Africans by Avance Media.

2021: Technology Pioneers by World Economic Forum.

2021: Young Global Leaders by World Economic Forum.

2021: New Economy Catalyst by Bloomberg.

2022: Top 20 under 40 biotech leaders by Endpoint News.

== Personal life ==
Abasi is married to Ini Dima-Okojie, a couple got legally married on May 19, 2022, and traditionally on May 21, 2022, in Lagos, Nigeria.

== Selected publications ==
- Ene-Obong, A.; Clear, A. J.; Watt, J.; Wang, J.; Fatah, R.; Riches, J. C.; Marshall, J. F.; Chin-Aleong, J.; Chelala, C.; Gribben, J. G.; Ramsay, A. G.; Kocher, H. M. (25 July 2013). "Activated Pancreatic Stellate Cells Sequester CD8+ T-Cells to Reduce Their Infiltration of the Juxtatumoral Compartment of Pancreatic Ductal Adenocarcinoma". Gastroenterology. 145 (5): 1121–1132. doi:10.1053/j.gastro.2013.07.025. PMC 3896919. PMID 23891972.
- Fatumo, S.; Yakubu, A.; Oyedele, O.; Popoola, J.; Attipoe, D. A.; Eze-Echesi, G.; Modibbo, F. Z.; Ado-Wanka, N. (1 May 2022). "Promoting the genomic revolution in Africa through the Nigerian 100K Genome Project". Nature Genetics. 54 (5): 531–536. doi:10.1038/s41588-022-01071-6. PMID 35534563.
- Joshi, E.; et al. (1 August 2023). "Whole-genome sequencing across 449 samples spanning 47 ethnolinguistic groups provides insights into genetic diversity in Nigeria". Cell Genomics. 3 (9) 100378. doi:10.1016/j.xgen.2023.100378. PMC 10504631. PMID 37719143.
- Biddanda, Arjun; De Arce, Karen Perez; Eze-Echesi, Golibe; Nwuba, Chiamaka; Ibrahim, Yusuf; Oyedele, Olubukunola; Joshi, Esha; Alalade, Boladale; Ajayi, Olanrewaju; Nwatu, Chidimma; Yakubu, Aminu; Ene-Obong, Abasi; Popoola, Jumi; o'Dushlaine, Colm; Fekkes, Peter (12 December 2022). "A survey of proteomic variation across two ethnic groups in Nigeria and its relationship to obesity risk". bioRxiv 10.1101/2022.12.09.519773.
