= Dear Affy =

2020 Nigerian romantic comedy film

- Promotional poster
- Directed by: Samuel Olatunji
- Screenplay by: Kehinde Joseph, Temitope Bolade-Akinbode, Diche Enunwa
- Starring: Toyin Abraham; Enyinna Nwigwe; Kehinde Bankole; Odunlade Adekola; Chiwetalu Agu; Ali Nuhu; Timini Egbuson; Atteh Daniel; Fathia Balogun; Lizzy Jay; Antnette Lecky; Enyinna Nwigwe; Seilat Adebowale
- Distributed by: FilmOne Entertainment
- Release date: 14 February 2020
- Running time: 110 minutes
- Country: Nigeria
- Language: English
- Box office: ₦39.6 million

Dear Affy is a 2020 Nigerian romantic comedy film written by Temitope Bolade, Diche Enunwa, Anthony Kehinde Joseph, and Samuel Olatunji and directed by Samuel Olatunji. The film stars Toyin Abraham, Enyinna Nwigwe, Kehinde Bankole and Odunlade Adekola in the lead roles. Newcomer Bianca Udo made her film acting debut through this film. The film had its theatrical release on 14 February 2020 coinciding Valentine's Day and received mixed reviews from critics.

== Synopsis ==
An organized ardent female art enthusiast who is about to marry the man of her dreams faces sudden obstacles and challenges after becoming pregnant accidentally even before her marriage. This spoiled her well-prepared and carefully laid out plans and strategies, and she embarks on a challenging mission in search of the father of her unborn baby.

== Cast ==
- Toyin Abraham as Teni the blogger
- Bimbo Akintola as Anna Duke
- Uzor Arukwe as Kelechi
- Kola Ajeyemi as Sunday
- Enyinna Nwigwe
- Kehinde Bankole as Affy
- Odunlade Adekola
- Chinedu Ikedieze as street child
- Bimbo Ademoye as Toche
- Hafiz Oyetoro as gateman
- Chiwetalu Agu as old man
- Ali Nuhu as Khalid
- Timini Egbuson as Akin
- Atteh Daniel as nerdy guy
- Fathia Balogun as Aunti Munumidun
- Lizzy Jay as Affy's friend
- Antnette Lecky
- Enyinna Nwigwe as Mike
- Seilat Adebowale as bride's friend

== Awards and nominations ==
Year	Award	Category	Recipient	Result	Ref
2020	Best of Nollywood Awards	Movie with the Best Comedy	Dear Affy	Won	
2020	Best of Nollywood Awards	Best Actor in a Lead role – English	Eyinna Nwigwe	Nominated	
2020	Best of Nollywood Awards	Best Actress in a Lead role –English	Kehinde Bankole	Nominated	
2020	Best of Nollywood Awards	Movie with the Best Screenplay	Dear Affy	Nominated	
2020	Best of Nollywood Awards	Movie with the Best Cinematography	Dear Affy	Nominated	
2022	Africa Magic Viewers' Choice Awards	Best Actor in A Comedy	Williams Uchemba	Nominated	
2022	Africa Magic Viewers' Choice Awards	Best Actress in A Drama	Kehinde Bankole	Nominated	
2022	Africa Magic Viewers' Choice Awards	Best Actor in A Drama	Eyinna Nwigwe	Nominated	
2022	Africa Magic Viewers' Choice Awards	Best Lighting Designer	Fei Mustapha	Nominated	
