= Mama Drama (film) =

2020 Nigerian drama film

- Directed by: Seyi Babatope
- Written by: Temitope Bolade; Diche Enunwa
- Produced by: Joy Grant-Ekong
- Starring: Osas Ighodaro; Kunle Remi; Kehinde Bankole; Femi Adebayo; Shafy Bello
- Cinematography: Pindem Lot
- Edited by: Eniola Ennis Adefidipe; Dayo Brown
- Music by: Peter O. Bolade; Victor Kpoudosu
- Production company: FilmOne Production
- Release date: 1 October 2020; (Nigeria)
- Running time: 85 minutes
- Country: Nigeria
- Language: English

Mama Drama, is a 2020 Nigerian drama film directed by Seyi Babatope and produced by Joy Grant-Ekong. The film stars Osas Ighodaro in the lead role whereas Kunle Remi, Kehinde Bankole, Femi Adebayo, and Shafy Bello made supportive roles. The film revolves around Mena Adelana, a woman with six miscarriages that hires her assistant as a surrogate despite her fertility issues and her mother-in-law's nagging, but many problems arise.

The film made its premier on 1 October 2020 at Filmhouse Imax cinemas and later released through Netflix in 2021. The film received mixed reviews from critics.

== Cast ==
- Osas Ighodaro as Mena Adelana
- Kunle Remi as Gboyega
- Kehinde Bankole as Kemi
- Femi Adebayo as Dotun
- Shafy Bello as Mama Adelana
- Adunni Ade as Simi
- Chinyere Wilfred as Aunty Nkem
- Olive Emodi as Barrister
- Rekiya Attah as Judge
- Opeyemi Ayeola as Ronke
- Adenola Adeniyi as Seyi Adelana
- Adeoluwa Daniels as Seyi Adelana
- Itombra Bofie as Hadiza
