= Binta International School =

Coordinates: 6.54756°N 3.29993°E

Binta International Schools

Location
- 7-9 Princess Bola Jegede Close; Ajao Estate, Lagos State, LA 100263; Nigeria

Information
- Motto: Excellence and Discipline
- Established: 1994 (nursery and primary); Sept 1995 (secondary); 2001 (creche)
- Founder: Adenuga family
- Status: Open
- Gender: Mixed
- Campus type: Urban
- Website: www.bintainternationalschools.com

Binta International Schools is a group of schools founded by Mrs.Ehi Adenuga and located in Lagos State. It operates a creche, nursery, basic and high school. The school was established in Ejigbo in 1994, but later opened in Ajao Estate, Isolo. The slogan of the school is "the school for the child you love", while the motto is "excellence and discipline". The name "BINTA" is an acronym for "Best In Nurturing Talents and Academics". They offer scholarships to deserving students yearly. Binta International School was the secondary school of "Binta" in the national television series Binta and Friends.

== Awards ==
- first position in Africa Independent Television Whizkid competition (November 1995)
- first prize in 12th Unilever essay competition (year 2000)
- first position in Africa Independent Television debate competition (July 2000)
- second prize in Cowbell annual Lagos all Secondary School Mathematics competition
- letter of recommendation from National Mathematics Center, Abuja in June 2001
