= Kill Boro =

2024 Nigerian film

Kill Boro is a 2024 Nigerian film.

== Plot summary ==
In a fictional town of Azuama, Boro is a former gangster. His son Elijah seeks to kill him so that he and his mother, Boma, may be free from his [Boro's] physical abuse.

== Cast ==
- Philip Asaya
- Kosi Ogborueche
- Ini Dima-Okojie as Boma

== Reception ==
What Kept Me Up lauds the film's usage of language, especially the Pidgin English.

Open Country Mag listed the film as one of its top 10 best films of Nollywood.
