= Benedicta Gafah =

Ghanaian actress and a film producer (born 1986)

- Born: Benedicta A.B Gafah; 1 September 1986 (age 39); Abelemkpe, Greater Accra Region, Ghana
- Education: African University College of Communications (AUCC)
- Alma mater: Presbyterian Girls Senior High School
- Occupations: Actress, TV host, entrepreneur, philanthropist
- Years active: 2010-present
- Known for: Gafah Foundation
- Awards: Kumawood Movie Awards, City People Entertainment Awards, KAM Award

Benedicta Gafah (born 1 September 1986) is a Ghanaian actress and a film producer. She has been featured in both Ghallywood and Kumawood movies which includes "Mirror Girl", "Azonto Ghost" and "April Fool". In an interview on Hitz FM by Andy Dosty, she said the collapse of Zylofon Media had no effect on her acting career.

== Filmography ==
- Mirror Girl (2012)
- Odo Asa
- April Fool
- Poposipopo (2012)
- Devils Voice
- Azonto Ghost (2012)
- Kweku Saman
- Adoma
- Agyanka Ba
- Ewiase Ahenie (2011) as Wife
- I Know My Right
- Agya Koo Azonto
- Afia Yakubu (2015)
- Happily Never After (2016)
- Selfie (2017)
- The New Adabraka (2018)
- The 2 Pilots (2019) as Efia
- Obsession (2022) as Ashley
- Who Is Your Guy (2023) as Fredina
- Ornaments of Dreams (2024)

== Awards and nominations ==
| Year | Award | Category | Result |
|---|---|---|---|
| 2015 | Kumawood Movie Awards | Actress of the Year | Won |
| 2015 | City People Entertainment Awards | Most Promising Actress | Nominated |
| 2013 | KAM Award | Discovery of the Year | Won |

== Philanthropy ==
Benedicta started giving alms to the needy and widows of King Jesus Orphanage Home in 2014. She took it to the streets to share foodstuffs, clothes, etc. every December to the street kids. She currently runs the Gafah Foundation to help the needy.
