= Funmilayo Ransome-Kuti (film) =

- Directed by: Bolanle Austen-Peters
- Written by: Tunde Babalola
- Produced by: Bolanle Austen-Peters
- Starring: Joke Silva; Kehinde Bankole; Ibrahim Suleiman; Jide Kosoko; Dele Odule
- Edited by: Tanja Hagen
- Music by: George Acogny; Alan Derian
- Production company: BAP Productions
- Release date: 17 May 2024
- Running time: 91 minutes
- Country: Nigeria
- Language: English

Funmilayo Ransome-Kuti is a 2024 biopic about the life and times of Funmilayo Ransome-Kuti, a renowned Nigerian activist and mother of Afrobeat musician Fela Kuti.

The film was screened at the 12th edition of the Africa International Film Festival (AFRIFF) where it won the prizes for Best Overall Feature Film and Best Screenplay.

== Plot ==
The film follows Funmilayo Ransome-Kuti from her youth as the first female student at Abeokuta Grammar School, her meeting with- and marriage to Israel Ransome-Kuti, her career as an educationist and the formation of the Abeokuta Women's Union (initially called the Abeokuta Ladies' Club) which led to the revolt against colonial rule and the patriarchy.

The film opens with a chilling portrayal of police brutality against civilians, with a focus on Funmilayo, who was allegedly thrown from a two-story building during the violent search for information on Fela Kuti's whereabouts.

The story is portrayed as a series of flashbacks narrated by Joke Silva.

== Cast ==
- Joke Silva as Older Funmilayo
- Kehinde Bankole as Funmilayo
- Iyimide Ayo-Olumoko as Younger Funmilayo
- Ibrahim Suleiman as Israel Ransome-Kuti
- Iremide Adeoye as Young Israel
- Earl Atta as Rev. Cole
- Jide Kosoko as Otun
- Dele Odule as Osi
- Adebayo Salami as Alake
- Keppy Ekpenyong as Josiah
- Adunni Ade as Mrs. Thompson
- Omowumi Dada as Grace Eniola
- Patrick Diabuah as Mr. Thomas
- Peter Thomas as Dundee
- Esther Oluwayemi as Iya Gbanba
- Adeola Omomo as Middle Aged Olikoye
- Abosede Ozah-Osho as Bertha Josiah
- Roland Obutu as Chief Enforcer

== Production and release ==
An initial title of Funmilayo: Lioness of Lisabi was announced in 2021.The film had a limited release in 2023 and screened for 7 days at the Silverbird Galleria from September 8 to 15.

Ransome Kuti's grandchildren made appearances in the film; Dotun Ransome-Kuti played the role of his father, Olikoye Ransom-Kuti, while Kunle-Ransome-Kuti also played the role of his father.

The film was submitted for consideration as one of the Nigerian entries for the Foreign Feature Film category at the 96th Academy Awards by the Nigerian Official Selection Committee (NOSC) for the Academy of Motion Pictures, Arts and Sciences.

The film was released in Nigerian theatres on 17 May 2024.

== Awards and nominations ==
Year	Award	Category	Result	Ref
2023	Africa International Film Festival (AFRIFF)	Best Overall Feature Film	Won	
2023	Africa International Film Festival (AFRIFF)	Best Screenplay	Won	
2024	2024 Africa Magic Viewers' Choice Awards	Best Costume Design	Nominated	
2024	2024 Africa Magic Viewers' Choice Awards	Best Writing (Movie)	Won	
2024	2024 Africa Magic Viewers' Choice Awards	Best Movie	Nominated	
