= Yinka Olukunga =

Nigerian actress

- Born: Olayinka Garfus Olukunga
- Education: Lagos State University
- Occupation: Actress
- Known for: Nnenna
- Awards: Lagos State University (LASU) Ambassador Award.

Yinka Olukunga, is a Nigerian actress, children's TV show producer, and host.

== Career ==
A Lagos State University graduate, she is best known for her numerous children's TV productions for Wale Adenuga Productions. She has said of her career: "Working with children makes me happy. I share a special bond with them and it brightens my day to see them smile". She was awarded Lagos State University (LASU) Ambassador Award.

== Personal life ==
She got married in 2014 and gave birth to twin girls Olivia and Maia on 18 September 2015.

== See also ==
- List of Nigerian actresses
