= Special Jollof =

2020 Nigerian romantic comedy drama film by Emem Isong

- Film poster
- Directed by: Emem Isong
- Produced by: Emem Isong
- Starring: Joseph Benjamin; Uche Jombo; Femi Adebayo
- Production company: Royal Arts Academy
- Distributed by: Blue Pictures Entertainment
- Release date: 14 February 2020
- Running time: 85 minutes
- Countries: Nigeria; United States
- Language: English

Special Jollof is a 2020 Nigerian-American romantic comedy film. Produced and directed by Emem Isong; Starring Joseph Benjamin, Uche Jombo and Femi Adebayo in the lead roles. The film was majorly shot in Nigeria and United States. The theme of the film is set as a love story, with immigration in the background. The film was released on 14 February 2020 coinciding with Valentine's Day and also with the celebration of the Black History Month in the United States.

== Cast ==
- Joseph Benjamin
- Uche Jombo
- Femi Adebayo
- DJ Kelblizz
- John Maciag
- Magdalen Vaughn
- Bukky Wright
- Robert Peters
- Chiwetalu Agu
- Perez Egbi

== Synopsis ==
A white American woman journalist who revives after a breakup with her lover starts working as an undercover at a Nigerian restaurant to prove that Nigerians migrate illegally to the USA. She then eventually falls in love with a Nigerian guy.

== Reception ==
The film was described as "an unexciting and overambitious flick that does not work as the romantic drama that it claims to be".
