= Finding Hubby =

- Directed by: Femi Ogunsanwo
- Written by: Temitope Bolade; Diche Enunwa; Tunde Leye
- Starring: Ade Laoye; Munachi Abii; Kehinde Bankole; Charles Etubiebi; Tina Mba
- Production companies: House Gabriel Studio; TLS Media Place
- Distributed by: Genesis Film Distribution
- Release date: 4 December 2020 (Nigeria)
- Running time: 104 minutes
- Country: Nigeria
- Languages: English; Yoruba; Igbo; Nigerian Pidgin

Finding Hubby is a 2020 Nigerian romantic drama film directed by Femi Ogunsanwo and starring Ade Laoye, Kehinde Bankole, Munachi Abii, and Charles Etubiebi. It is a screen adaptation of a blog series of the same name written by Tunde Leye. A sequel, Finding Hubby 2, was released in 2021.

== Plot ==
Oyin Clegg (Ade Laoye)—a 35-year-old marketing executive with a Lagos-based firm—is a successful career woman, but her personal life causes concern for her meddling mother (Tina Mba). Although she indulges in one-night stands with eligible men on standby, Oyin is yet to find a suitable partner despite persistence from her boss Ossy (Charles Etubiebi), the seemingly perfect man with whom Oyin fails to connect. She is ecstatic when the firm announces their collaboration with Yomi Kester-Jacobs (Paul Utomi), heir to a thriving business empire, but is enraged after the firm denies her the opportunity to travel to the United States for a team-building workshop due to her unmarried status.

Oyin is reunited with Ade (Efa Iwara), a successful writer she had dated ten years prior before calling time on their relationship due to his dire straits. Their romance is rekindled after she discovers he has now achieved international recognition and wealth, but Oyin is later humiliated when Ade—who now regards Oyin as a gold-digging opportunist—dumps her in revenge. The incident leaves her depressed until Ossy surprises her with a getaway to Dubai.

At the airport, Oyin runs into the condescending Moroti (Omowunmi Dada) who subtly throws shade until Yomi Kester-Jacobs unexpectedly comes to Oyin's rescue, pretending they are a couple. Ossy, who meets her at the airport upon her return from Dubai, is horrified to discover his heartthrob has connected with Yomi on holiday, and rebounds with Oyin's friend Gloria (Munachi Abii), proposing to her in two weeks. Oyin is initially betrayed but agrees to be chief bridesmaid at their registry wedding.

On the night of her engagement party, Oyin discovers her fiancé is a closted gay man using her as a beard to conceal his true orientation. Her church's youth minister Pastor T (Tope Tedela) and Toke (Kehinde Bankole)—Oyin's other friend—both suggest she break up with him. Her mother, still eager to see her daughter marry and save the family from shame, advises her daughter to go through with the wedding. The film ends with Oyin ponding her final decision.

== Cast ==
- Ade Laoye as Oyin
- Munachi Abii as Gloria
- Kehinde Bankole as Toke
- Charles Etubiebi as Ossy
- Efa Iwara as Ade
- Paul Utomi as Yomi
- Tina Mba as Oyin's mother
- Tope Tedela as Pastor T
- Damilola Ogunsi as Desmond
- Omowunmi Dada as Moroti
- Samuel Asa'ah as D.G.
- Demi Banwo as Olumide
- Sammy Eddy as Aminu
- Chris Isibor as Kalu
- Teniola Aladese as Tosan

== Production and release ==
Finding Hubby is based on a blog series by Tunde Leye, published between April and September 2012. It was released in Nigerian cinemas on 4 December 2020, and released on Netflix on 9 July 2021.

== Differences between blog series and film ==
- Some of the characters' names in the blog series were changed for the film (Oyin's ex-boyfriend Femi is renamed Ade; her youth minister, Hawt Pastor, is Pastor T; and Gloria's boyfriend Alvin is Kelvin).
- In the movie, Oyin first meets Yomi when he rescues her from Moroti at the airport, but the blog version introduces the reader to Yomi when he strikes up a conversation with Oyin on the flight to Dubai.
- Kelvin's (Alvin in the blog) secret wife in the blog version is British; in the movie, she speaks with an American accent.
- In the blog version, Oyin attempts to reconnect with her occasional bed companion Kalu after discovering her fiancé Yomi is gay; in the film, Kalu is not shown again after their awkward meeting outside the nightclub.
- The character Desmond was specially created for the film and does not appear in the blog series.

== Reception ==
A Nollywood critic described "Finding Hubby" as "a film that tacitly acknowledges the many spheres of pressure the average young adult dwells in." It was rated 4 out of 10 by the movie reviewer, Martin Cid.

== See also ==
- Finding Hubby 2
