= Taste of Love (Nigerian TV series) =

- Theatrical poster
- Genre: Telenovela
- Starring: Blossom Chukwujekwu; Makida Moka; Ini Dima-Okojie; Lilian Esoro; Gabriel Afolayan; Deyemi Okanlawon
- Composer: J
- Country of origin: Nigeria
- Original language: English
- No. of seasons: 1
- No. of episodes: 150

Production
- Executive producer: Micromedia Marketing Limited
- Production locations: Lagos, Lagos; Ilorin, Kwara; Ibadan, Oyo

Original release
- Network: Africa Magic; Silverbird Television
- Release: October 2014

Taste of Love is a 2014 Nigerian telenovela, created by Globacom and aired on Africa Magic and STV. On release, it was reported to be the first Nigerian telenova. The complete season featured 150 episodes that began airing in October 2014.

== Synopsis ==
The series is centered on the interrelationships between the families of Musa-Phillips, Pepples and Rhodes.

== Cast ==
- Blossom Chukwujekwu as Kelechi Pepple
- Makida Moka as Hadiza Musa-Philips
- Ini Dima-Okojie
- Lilian Esoro as Ronke
- Gabriel Afolayan
- Deyemi Okanlawon
- Kunle Coker as Jonathan Pepple
- Mofe Duncan as Tochukwu Pepple
- Chelsea Eze as Eve Ikpeba
- Ayo Lijadu as Ibrahim Musa-Philips
- Yomi Obileye as Paa. J.
- Dickson Okezue as Jerry
- Dolapo Orisajobi as Nnenna Pepple
- Uzor Osimkpa as Gertrude Rhodes
- Adeyemi Tolulope as Adaro

== Reception ==
For their roles as "Hadiza" and "Kelechi", Makida Moka and Blossom received "television actress of the year" and "television actor of the year" nominations at the 2015 Nigerian Broadcasters Merit Awards. The series was also nominated for TV series of the year category, but lost to Super Story.
