= Diche Enunwa =

Nigerian screenwriter and film producer

- Citizenship: Nigerian
- Occupations: Screenwriter, film producer

Diche Enunwa is a Nigerian screenwriter, and film producer.

== Career ==
Diche and Temitope Bolade-Akinbode started Writers Ink Concepts in 2015 and have since co-written screenplays for movies including Namaste Wahala, a Netflix original.

They were jointly nominated for Best Comedy Writer in the 2015 Africa Magic Viewers Choice Awards for ...When Love Happens.

== Filmography ==
Below are some of the films Diche has written or cowritten.

Year	Title	Role	Notes	Ref
2015	...When Love Happens	Co writer	Received nominations at the 2015 Africa Magic Viewers Choice Awards in three categories	
2017	In Line	Co writer		
2020	Namaste Wahala	Co writer	Released as a global Netflix original on 14 February 2021	
2020	Dear Affy	Co writer		
2020	Mama Drama	Co writer		
2020	Finding Hubby	Co writer		
2021	Finding Hubby 2	Co writer		
2021	Sanitation Day	Co writer	Released on Netflix on 21 July 2021	
2021	Fine Wine	Co writer		
2023	Offshoot	Co writer		
2024	On the Edge	Co producer	Premiered on Amazon Prime Video	
2024	Wedding Night Blues	Producer		

== Awards ==
- Eko Star Awards, 2021
