= Ini Dima-Okojie =

Nigerian actress (born 1990)

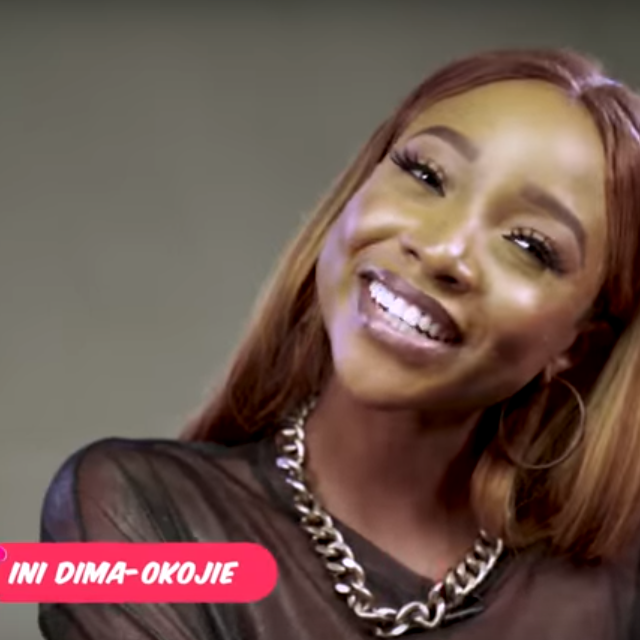
- Dima-Okojie in 2017
- Born: 24 June 1990 (age 36); Lagos State, Nigeria
- Education: Covenant University
- Occupations: Actress, fashion enthusiast
- Years active: 2014–present
- Known for: Blood Sisters
- Spouse: Abasi Ene-Obong (m. 2022)

Ini Dima-Okojie (born 24 June 1990) is a Nigerian actress from Edo State, Nigeria. She resigned from her job in investment banking to enroll at the New York Film Academy. Her debut was Taste of Love, and since then, she has appeared in Namaste Wahala (2021) and Netflix's Blood Sisters (2022-present).

== Early life and education ==
Dima-Okojie is from Esan North-East LGA, Edo State, Nigeria. Her father is a medical doctor and her mother is a retired banker and entrepreneur. She attended Air Force primary school in Lagos and moved to Air Force comprehensive secondary school, Ibadan. She studied at Covenant University, Nigeria, where she earned a degree in International Relations. She quit her job in investment banking to pursue a pathway into acting. This led her to earn a degree in acting from the New York Film Academy.

== Career ==
2013 – 2017

Dima-Okojie resigned, from her job in the finance industry to pursue a career in entertainment. Her career in Nollywood started as a production assistant on the film Before 30 and she went on to make her acting debut when she played the role of Feyisayo Pepple, in the television series Taste of Love. In 2016, she played the role of Hadiza Ahmed in the film North East; her character was that of a Muslim lady who began a romantic relationship with a man from a different religious background. For her role in the film, she was nominated for Best Actress in a Supporting Role at the 2017 Nigeria Entertainment Awards. Dima-Okojie was also nominated for Most Promising Actress at City People Movie Awards around the same time. She was nominated for The Future Awards Africa in 2017.

In 2016, she played the role of Hadiza in a web series by Ndani TV, Skinny Girl in Transit. She also featured in 5ive, It's her day, and North East in the same year.

In 2017, she featured in Battleground and The Royal Hibiscus Hotel She was nominated for The Future Awards prize for acting. She appeared on Pulse Nigeria's list of the 7 Nollywood actresses of 2017.

2018 – 2021

In 2018, she starred in two movies, Sylvia where she played the role of Gbemi Ogunlana, in a story based on a fiction of spirit lovers. Later that year, she was cast in Funke where she played the role of Ms. Catherine, starring Jide Kosoko, Eniola Badmus, Segun Arinze and directed by Yemi Morafa. The story which was set in 1996 was centred on a young girl's ultimate dream to become a footballer and her struggle to surmount gender roles inherent in her community. In 2018, her outfit to Heineken Lagos fashion week was featured in British and Germany Vogue.

In 2019, she was featured in a role as Laitan Gesinde on the web TV series Oga Pastor directed by Daniel Oriahi. The series was later pulled down by Ndani TV

In 2020, she starred as Tami in the series, Smart Money Woman, an adaptation from a book of the same title by Arese Ugwu. Also in 2020, Who's the boss, featured Dima-Okojie as Jumoke, a best friend to Liah, played by Sharon Ooja.

In 2021, she featured in the Netflix original Namaste Wahala, a multicultural romantic-comedy feature film where she played the role of Didi.

2022

In 2022, she starred in the Netflix Original series Blood Sisters, playing the lead role of Sarah. The series was produced by Mo Abudu's Ebonylife Studios. The premiere was well attended by Nollywood stars

== Personal life ==
Dima-Okojie is the youngest of four children, with two sisters and one brother. Her parents are both devoted Catholics; her father a retired Air Commodore in the Nigerian Air Force and a military-trained doctor. Her mother is a licensed lawyer who worked in the banking sector. Dima-Okojie is also noted to have a strong fashion sense, with Pulse Nigeria and other media outlets describing her as one of the most stylish celebrities in Nigeria. Dima-Okojie has cited Majid Michel and Richard Mofe-Damijo as her favourite Nollywood actors.

In December 2020, she opened up on her Instagram page about her struggle and journey with uterine fibroids since 2017.

In 2021, she announced her engagement to Abasi Ene-Obong, the owner of 54Gene. They married in May 2022 and welcomed a number of Nollywood actors and actresses at the wedding.

== Filmography ==
=== TV shows ===
| Year | Title | Role | Notes | Ref |
|---|---|---|---|---|
| 2022 | Blood Sisters | Sarah Duru | A Netflix Original series | |
| 2020 | The Smart Money Woman | Tami | Based on a book of the same name by Arese Ugwu | |
| 2019 | Oga! Pastor | Laitan Gesinde | | |
| 2018 | Battleground (The final showdown) | Teni Badmus | Africa Magic original | |
| 2017 | Battleground | Teni Badmus | Africa Magic original | |
| 2016 | 5ive | | | |
| 2015–2017 | Skinny Girl in Transit | Hadiza | Directors Bunmi Ajakaiye, Muhammad Atta Ahmed, Ema Edosio | |
| 2015 | Desperate Housewives of Africa | | Aired on Mnet | |
| 2015 | Vanity's Last Game | | Aired on Mnet | |
| 2014 | Taste of Love | Feyisayo Pepple | Nigeria's first telenovela | |

=== Films ===
| Year | Title | Role | Notes | Ref |
|---|---|---|---|---|
| 2025 | The Fire and the Moth | Abike | | |
| 2024 | Skeleton Coast | Adana | with Mawuli Gavour, Damilola Adegbite | |
| 2024 | Kill Boro | Boma | with Gregory Ojefua, Philip Asaya. | |
| 2023 | A Weekend to Forget | Layo | with Daniel Etim Effiong, Stan Nze, Uche Nwaefuna, Neo Akpofure, Akin Lewis | |
| 2022 | Foreigner's God | Anya | with Pete Edochie, Nancy Isime, Sam Dede | |
| 2021 | Day of Destiny | Young Ifeoma | with Olumide Oworu, Gbemi Akinlade, Denola Grey | |
| 2021 | Lockdown | Angela | A Nigerian romantic comedy featuring Omotola Jalade Ekeinde, Sola Sobowale and Tony Umez | |
| 2021 | The Wait | Nkechi | A Faith-based film | |
| 2021 | Namaste Wahala | Didi | Nollywood/Bollywood cross-cultural romantic comedy | |
| 2020 | Who's The Boss | Jumoke | A Nigerian Romantic Comedy Film featuring Sharon Ooja, Funke Akindele, Beverly Osu | |
| 2020 | DOD | Young Ifeoma | The first family adventure film in Nigeria | |
| 2019 | Kpali | Amaka Kalayor | Alongside Nkem Owoh | |
| 2018 | Funke! | Ms. Cathrine | Set in 1996 – Alongside Segun Arinze and Jide Kosoko | |
| 2018 | Sylvia | Gbemi Ogunlana | Alongside Zainab Balogun, Chris Attoh, Bolaji Ogunmola | |
| 2017 | The Royal Hibiscus Hotel | Joyce | Alongside Zainab Balogun, Kenneth Okolie, Jide Kosoko | |
| 2016 | The Following Day | | Alongside Samuel Asa'ah, Daniel Lloyd, | |
| 2016 | North East | Hadiza Ahmed | Alongside O.C Ukeje, Carol King, Funky Mallam | |
| 2016 | It's Her Day | Nicole Hernandez | Alongside Adunni Ade, Omobola Akinde, Shaffy Bello | |
| 2016 | A Bone to Pick | Alicia | Starred alongside IK Ogbonna | |
| 2015 | Death Toll | | | |
| 2015 | The Prenup | | Starred alongside Alex Ekubo | |
| 2014 | Bad Hair Day | | Shot while in NYFA | |

TV Host

| Year | Title | Cast Name | Notes |
|---|---|---|---|
| 2014 | My Big Nigerian Wedding | Presenter | Aired on Africa Magic in 2015 |

Production

| Year | Title | Role |
|---|---|---|
| 2015 | Before 30 | Production Assistant |

== Awards and nominations ==
| Year | Award | Category | Work | Result | Ref |
|---|---|---|---|---|---|
| 2020 | Golden Movies Awards | Best Golden Actress Drama | | Nominated | |
| 2017 | Nigeria Entertainment Awards | Best Actress in a Supporting Role | | Nominated | |
| 2017 | City People Movie Awards | Most Promising Actress | | Nominated | |
| 2017 | ELOY Awards | TV Actress of the Year | | Nominated | |
| 2017 | The Future Awards | Prize for acting | | Nominated | |
| 2023 | Africa Magic Viewers' Choice Awards | Best Actress In A Drama, Movie Or TV Series | Flawsome | Nominated | |

== Gallery ==
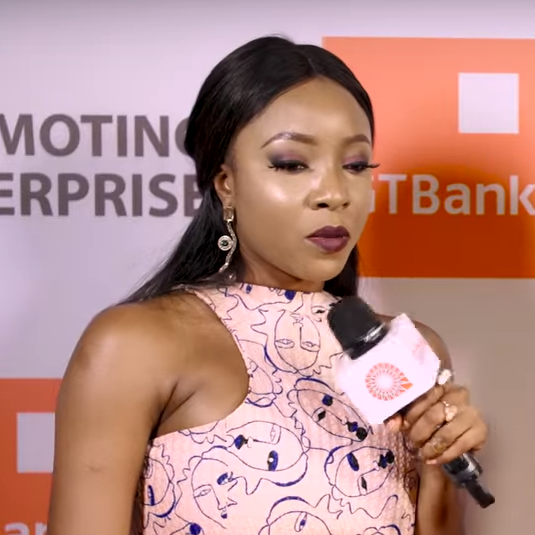

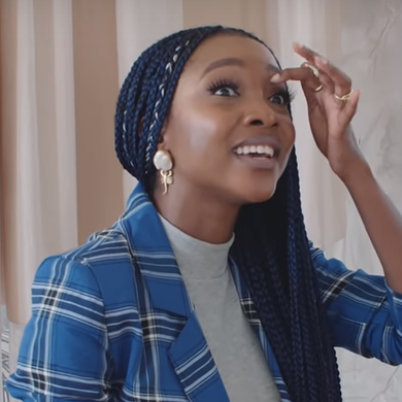

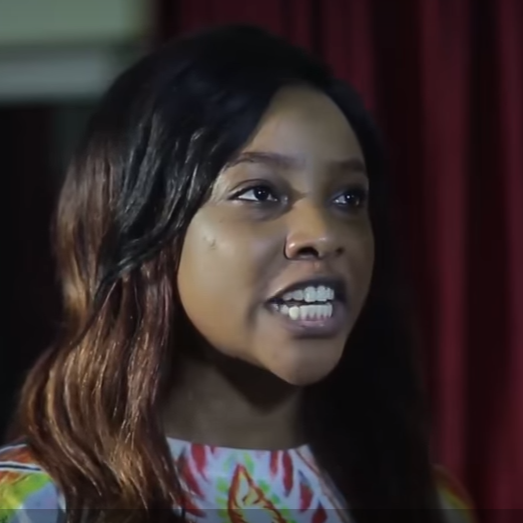

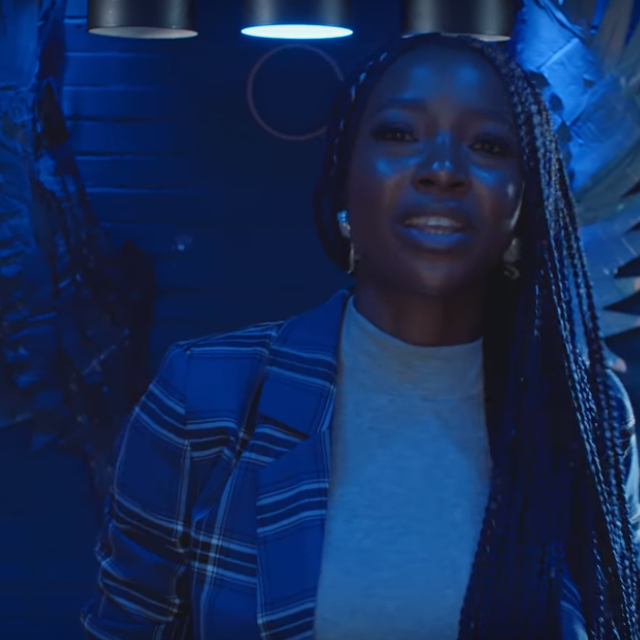

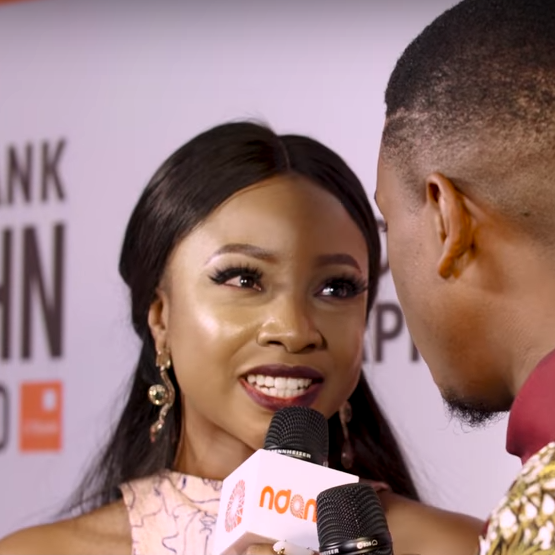

== See also ==
- List of Nigerian actresses
