= North East (film) =

- Release Poster
- Directed by: Muyiwa Aluko
- Produced by: Mary Njoku
- Starring: Ini Dima-Okojie; OC Ukeje; Carol King; Gbenga Titiloye, Unanka Ikechukwu, Sandra Stevens, Alex Ayalogu, Tope Sadiq, Umem Umoh, Belinda Agedah
- Music by: Capital FEMI
- Distributed by: Iroko Partners Limited
- Release date: June 23, 2016
- Running time: 113 minutes
- Country: Nigeria
- Languages: English; HausaAlex Ayalogu

North East is a 2016 Nigerian romantic drama film written, co-produced and directed by Muyiwa Aluko. The film starred Ini Dima-Okojie and OC Ukeje. It was released on June 23, 2016, in Nigeria at Genesis Deluxe Cinemas. For her role as "Hadiza" in the film, Dima-Okojie was nominated for best supporting actress at the 2017 Nigeria Entertainment Awards.

The story revolves around the relationship between two culturally different persons, and the challenges they faced in getting the approval of their parents in inter-tribal and multi-religious consummation of the marriage in a modern Nigerian society.

== Plot ==
The film starts with Hadiza and her father, Musa Ahmed performing the daily Salah, according to Islamic beliefs. Musa is a devout Muslim, who regularly attempts to indoctrinate his daughter into believing that only an Islamic Hausa man can make the best husband. Hadiza is more liberal in her view on marriage, and she frequently reads the biographical book, There was a Country, which was a narration on the events that occurred during the Nigerian Civil War written by Igbo author, Chinua Achebe. In a bid to ensure his family remain within the tribal and religious lines, Musa also match-makes Aliyu, an Islamic Northerner, to initiate a relationship with Hadiza, however she often felt no chemistry when he is around her.

Emeka Okafor is a Christian from Southeastern Nigeria. He works as a physiotherapist in an unnamed hospital. During one of Hadiza's field trip to a site, she lost a step and fell from the building. She got hospitalized and was admitted to the hospital Emeka worked in. Despite being repelled by his jokes on first sight, they later began a relationship despite the ethnic differences. Musa is later revealed to be unknowingly dating Emeka's mother, Ifeoma, both of whom are widows after losing their spouses from their first marriages. A dinner night is fixed for the four couples to meet. On seeing that his daughter is dating the son of his lover, Musa objected to the continuation of the relationship, explaining that it violated his religious beliefs and personal principles. He also unsuccessfully attempted to bribe Emeka into sacrificing his relationship for the greater good. After many ensued from his decision, Emeka and Hadiza finally wedded with the blessings of their family.

== Cast ==
- Ini Dima-Okojie as Hadiza Ahmed
- OC Ukeje as Emeka Okafor
- Carol King as Ifeoma Okafor
- Saeed "Funky Mallam" Muhammed as Aliyu
- Gbenga Titiloye as Musa Ahmed
- Capital FEMI as himself
- Tope Sadiq as Mr. Remi
- Umem Umoh as Tunde
- Belinda Agedah as Nurse Jane
- Alex Ayalogu as Doctor Toristhe
- Sandra Stevens as Cynthia
- Unanka Ikechukwu as Bulus

== Reception ==
It was panned on Nollywood Reinvented, who criticized its production quality and sound. With a 41% rating, the site consensus reads "North East really is simply a cheesy romance that only wins because of the valid points it makes and conversations it starts.". On ReviewNaija, it got a 5/10 rating. The story and acting were noted as standout in the film, however its predictability and extreme length was cited as fallout in the film. The Movie Pencil gave it an "A+", describing it as one of the smoothest Nigerian romantic films with an excellent continuity and stellar performances from the lead actors.
