= Obsession (2022 film) =

2022 Nigerian film

- Directed by: Chidiebere Nwosu
- Written by: Adelarin Awotedu
- Produced by: Vincent Tobi
- Starring: Mercy Aigbe; Shaffy Bello; Munachi Abii
- Cinematography: Omo Akhigbe
- Edited by: Daniel Tom
- Music by: Adelarin Awotedu; Jennifer Samuel
- Production company: VNation Pictures
- Release date: March 25, 2022 (Nigeria)
- Country: Nigeria
- Language: English

Obsession is a 2022 Nigerian movie written by Adelarin Awotedu, produced by Vincent Tobi, and directed by Chidiebere Nwosu under the production company VNation Pictures. The film stars Mercy Aigbe, Shaffy Bello, Muna Abii, Benedicta Gafah and Gideon Okeke.

== Synopsis ==
The movie revolves around a couple, John and Ashley, whose home becomes unsettled because of their new neighbour, Chloe. Ashley tries to befriend the neighbor, but unbeknownst to her, Chloe is suffering from body dysmorphia.

== Premiere ==
The movie was premiered on Sunday, March 20, 2022, at Blue Pictures Cinema in Ikeja, Lagos; it also premiered in Ghana.

== Cast ==
- Gideon Okeke as John
- Benedicta Gafah as Ashley
- Munachi Abii as Chloe
- Mercy Aigbe as Jane
- Shafy Bello as Dr. Ann
