= Code of Silence (2015 film) =

- Directed by: Emem Isong
- Written by: Bola Aduwo
- Starring: Makida Moka, Patience Ozokwor, Ini Edo and Omoni Oboli
- Release date: August 8, 2015 (Lagos)
- Country: Nigeria
- Language: English

Code of Silence is a 2015 Nigerian drama film directed by Emem Isong and written by Bola Aduwo. The film was produced by the Royal Arts Academy in collaboration with Nollywood Workshop. It stars Makida Moka in the lead role of Adanma, Patience Ozokwor, Ini Edo and Omoni Oboli. It is notable for its powerful stance against rape in Nigeria and addresses issues facing rape victims in the country.

== Plot ==
Adanma, a young, intelligent medical student with promising career prospects, is gang-raped by a local politician and his aide on her way home from college. She confesses what happened to her family, but given their low position in the society, are afraid to alert the authorities. The rape damages Adanma psychologically and emotionally, and the traumatic experience begins to affect her entire life.

== Cast ==
- Makida Moka as Adanma
- Patience Ozokwor
- Ini Edo
- Omoni Oboli
- Amechi Muonagor
- Kofi Adjorlolo
- Desmond Elliot
- Shawn Faqua
- Mena Sodje

== Production ==
Code of Silence was produced by the Royal Arts Academy in collaboration with Nollywood Workshop. The second feature picture to be filmed by Emem Isong, she said of her reasoning to shoot the picture: "Sometimes, I do advocacy movies and code of silence is one of such movies. I decided to do a movie on rape to urge people to come out and say 'NO' to rape. Let's break the code of silence. We want to break the assumption that the victim is at fault. The story actually found me because my friend brought the story to me and when I read it, I realised that I had a good one. It's a 20 million budget movie. I decided to work with these cast because I've worked with most of them and I felt they would interpret the roles properly."

Actress and model Makida Moka found shooting the picture to be an "intense" experience, which traumatised her to the point that she was often in tears after scenes were cut.

== Reception ==
The film premiered on August 8, 2015, at Silverbird Galleria, Victoria Island, Lagos, in an event which was well-attended by the stars of the Nollywood industry. The film received acclaim from critics. Toni Kan, writing for The NET remarked that the film "travels considerable distance to encourage the reversal of tendencies like stigma which restrains victims and their families from speaking up when rape occurs", and effectively "speaks to everyone: it addresses the issue of what society loses when women are subjected to forced sex, when we all keep quiet about it and why men should have more respect for themselves by not taking the low bend into being rapists". Despite the trauma of the rape, Kan notes that the film is interspersed with moments of comic relief.
