= In Line (film) =

2017 Nigerian drama film by Tope Oshin

In line
- Directed by: Tope Oshin
- Story by: Diche Enunwa Temitope; Bolade-Akinbode
- Produced by: Chinyere Ozoemena
- Starring: Adesua Etomi; Tina Mba; Uzor Arukwe; Sika Osei; Chris Attoh; Shawn Faqua
- Distributed by: Netflix
- Release date: 1 September 2017
- Running time: 1h 54m
- Country: Nigeria
- Language: English

In line is a 2017 Nigerian drama film directed by Tope Oshin. The movie was released on 1 September 2017 and it stars Adesua Etomi, Uzor Arukwe, Chris Attoh, Tina Mba, and Shawn Faqua.

== Plot ==
The film is about a man called Debo (Arukwe) who went to jail for killing his biological father. Six years later, he got a presidential pardon as a result of his mother's influence. He returned home, but things were no longer the same between him and his wife, Kate (Adesua). The wife finds happiness in the arms of David, who happens to be her husband's friend and lawyer. Debo suspected that his wife was having an affair, and his business was not stable. Debo employed a private investigator Bella (Sika Osei) to follow her. Because of a previous relationship that clouded the bond, it interfered with their supposedly professional relationship. Kate also on her own side has her reasons for the way she behaved.

== Cast ==
- Adesua Etomi as Kate
- Chris Attoh as David
- Sika Osei as Bella
- Uzor Arukwe as Debo Devi
- Leonora Okine as Vanessa
- Shawn Faqua as Steve
- Tina Mba as Mama Debo
- Esosa Adah as Christy
- Elsie Ajokku as Flight Attendant
- Denice Chikaodi as Anjola
- Michael Ekeme as Tony
