= Hamisha Daryani Ahuja =

Indian-Nigerian filmmaker

Hamisha Daryani-Ahuja
- Born: Hamisha Daryani; 7 July 1984 (age 42); Mumbai, India
- Education: ACS International School; McMaster University; American Academy of Dramatic Arts
- Occupations: Producer; director; actress; businesswoman
- Years active: 2021–present
- Spouse: Sailesh Ahuja
- Children: 2

Hamisha Daryani Ahuja (born 7 July 1984) is an Indian film producer, director, actress and businesswoman based in Nigeria. Ahuja made her directorial and acting debut in the Nollywood-Bollywood cross-cultural film Namaste Wahala. She also runs a chain of restaurants in Lagos.

== Early life and education ==
Ahuja was born in Mumbai to a third-generation Indian-origin Sindhi family based in Nigeria. Her family moved to Nigeria when she was two years old and she grew up in Lagos. She attended ACS International School, Cobham, McMaster University, Ontario, and American Academy of Dramatic Arts, New York, where she studied acting.

== Career ==
Ahuja runs her production company Forever 7 Entertainment and also made her filmmaking debut as a director and actress in the 2021 film Namaste Wahala, a cross-cultural venture of the Nigerian film industry Nollywood and the Indian film industry, Bollywood. The project was a venture to combine elements of both Bollywood and Nollywood, which Ahuja used to create a love story between the two film industries.

Ahuja is bringing to the big screen a film starring Nollywood superstar Sola Sobowale, also known as "Toyin Tomato," and Samuel Perry, better known as "Broda Shaggi," in an effort to further promote the partnership between the Nollywood and Bollywood film industries. The director has promised fans that her newest project will surpass her first one, even though other information are still being kept under wraps.

Ahuja's next venture Postcards was released in 2024. It follows the lives of four Nigerians who discover love, acceptance, and prosperity in India after embarking on individual journeys of self-discovery whilst conquering their fears.

== Filmography ==
=== Film ===
Year	Title	Director	Role	Notes
2021	Namaste Wahala	Yes	Leila	Nollywood-Bollywood debut, Netflix

=== TV Series ===
Year	Title	Director	Role	Notes
2024	Postcards	Yes	Film Producer	Netflix

== Awards and nominations ==
Year	Award ceremony	Prize	Film	Result	Ref
2022	Africa Magic Viewers' Choice Awards	Best Director of the Year	Namaste Wahala	Nominated	
