= Abiodun Ayoyinka =

Nigerian comedic actor

- Born: Abiodun Ayoyinka; 1960 (age 65–66)
- Other names: Papa Ajasco
- Citizenship: Nigerian

Abiodun Ayoyinka (born 1960) is a Nigerian comic actor and is also known as Papa Ajasco.

== Filmography ==
- Papa Ajasco & Company

== See also ==
- List of Nigerian comedians
