= ...When Love Happens =

2014 Nigerian romance film by Seyi Babatope

- Theatrical release poster
- Directed by: Seyi Babatope
- Written by: Diche Enunwa; Temitope Bolade
- Story by: Seyi Babatope
- Produced by: Kene Mparu; Moses Babatope; Seyi Babatope
- Starring: Weruche Opia; OC Ukeje; Beverly Naya; Oreka Godis; Gideon Okeke; Bukky Wright; Desmond Elliot; Wale Ojo; Enyinna Nwigwe
- Cinematography: Pindem Lot
- Edited by: Joe Larue
- Music by: Re Olunuga
- Production companies: Future Gate Pictures; PHB Films
- Distributed by: FilmOne Distributions
- Release date: 24 October 2014
- Running time: 100 minutes
- Country: Nigeria
- Language: English

...When Love Happens is a 2014 Nigerian romantic comedy film co-produced and directed by Seyi Babatope. It stars Weruche Opia, OC Ukeje, Beverly Naya, Oreka Godis, Gideon Okeke, Bukky Wright, Desmond Elliot, Wale Ojo, Keppy Ekpenyong and Shafy Bello. The film tells the story of Mo, a successful Events planner whose job is to help other people plan their weddings, but finds it hard to get into a relationship.

== Cast ==
- Weruche Opia as Moduroti 'Mo' Bankole-Smith
- Gideon Okeke as Tobe Okoronkwo
- Beverly Naya as Jennifer Obigwe
- Oreka Godis as Tseju
- OC Ukeje as Dare Laguda
- Keppy Ekpenyong as Tunde Bankole-Smith
- Shafy Bello as Anna Bankole-Smith
- Wale Ojo as Oladele Laguda
- Bukky Wright as Mrs Laguda
- Desmond Elliot as Lanre
- Helen Paul as Chika
- Blossom Chukwujekwu as Ike
- KC Ejelonu as KC
- Femi Brainard as
- Enyinna Nwigwe as

== Production ==
Production of the film took 7 months. Principal photography, which lasted for two weeks, commenced in Lagos around February 2014.

== Release ==
Behind the scenes short documentary videos were constantly released on YouTube from August through September 2014. A teaser trailer was released on 3 September 2014, along with promotional posters and photos. The official theatrical trailer was released online on 19 September 2014. It premiered on 16 October 2014, at the Genesis Deluxe Cinema, The Palms in Lekki, Lagos, and was generally released in movie theatres on 24 October 2014.

== Reception ==
=== Critical reception ===
The film has been positively received since its release; Bello and Ekpeyong have been generally described as the standout couple in the film. Most critics however noted that Okeke is unable to get out of his Tinsel character, and that the chemistry between Opia and Okeke is almost non-existent (or not harnessed) on screen. Nollywood Reinvented gave it a 41%, mentioning that there is not much more to this than the purest and most basic form of a 'chic flick'. Sodas and Popcorn gave a 4 out of 5 stars and concluded: "When Love Happens is a well-directed movie, with a lovely cast and crew. It delivers a very fun time. If you are a fan of simple, fun and family healthy comedies, you would love this one". Toni Kan commends the scripting and the performances from the actors, concluding that: "Over all, this is a delightful movie that does Nollywood proud". Efeturi Doghudje of 360Nobs praised the picture quality and music, but noted that the film dragged a bit due to presence of unnecessary scenes and long dialogues, which could've been edited. She rated the film 4 out of 10 stars and concluded: "for a first feature film, When Love Happens was something more than an ordinary. It is an easy-going RomCom, with a well thought out cast and a great production". Movie Pencil commended the scripting and production quality. It gave the film 4 out of 5 stars, describing it as a "feel good experience".

=== Accolades ===
When Love Happens received nominations at the 2015 Africa Magic Viewers Choice Awards in three categories, including "Best Actress in a Comedy" for Opia and "Best Supporting Actor" for Ukeje.

Complete list of Awards
| Award | Category | Recipients and nominees | Result |
|---|---|---|---|
| Multichoice (2015 Africa Magic Viewers Choice Awards) | Best Actress in a Comedy | Weruche Opia | Nominated |
| Multichoice (2015 Africa Magic Viewers Choice Awards) | Best Supporting Actor | OC Ukeje | Nominated |
| Multichoice (2015 Africa Magic Viewers Choice Awards) | Best Comedy Writer | Diche Enunwa, Temitope Bolade | Nominated |

== See also ==
- List of Nigerian films of 2014
