= Emem Isong =

Nigerian screenwriter, film producer, and director

Emem Isong Misodi
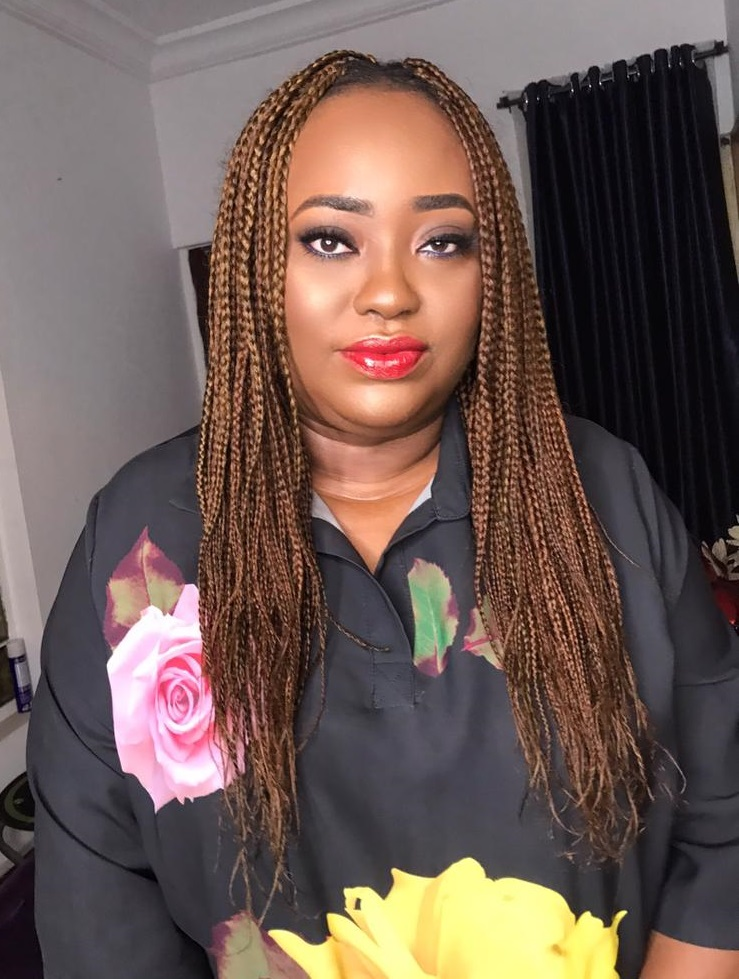
- Emem Isong in 2020
- Born: Ikono, Akwa Ibom State, Nigeria
- Education: University of Calabar (BA); University of the Creative Arts (PhD)
- Occupations: Producer; screenwriter; director
- Years active: 1994 - present
- Spouse: Misodi Akama
- Children: 3
- Website: https://www.youtube.com/@EmemIsongTV

Emem Isong is a Nigerian screenwriter, film producer, and film director. She is primarily known for films in the English language, and is a prominent figure in the Nollywood industry. Her second feature as a director, Code of Silence, which deals with rape in Nigeria, was released in 2015.

== Early life and education ==
Isong, the first of four children, was born on 5 September and is from Ikono Local Government Area of Akwa Ibom State in Nigeria. She obtained a Bachelor of Arts degree in theater arts from the University of Calabar and a diploma in computer science from the Computer Science Institute (NCR). In 2024, she earned a doctorate degree in film and media arts from the University of the Creative Arts, United Kingdom.

== Career ==
Isong's career in filmmaking began in 1994 when she wrote the script and co-produced the film Jezebel. Her first solo production was Breaking Point (1996). She later worked with Remmy Jez for eight years as a producer. The professional relationship ended in 2008, after which she co-produced the film Reloaded.

She has written or produced films such as Reloaded, Breaking Point, She Devil, A Minute To Midnight, Play Boy, Private Sin, Master Stroke, Rumours, Shattered Illusion, Promise Me Forever and Emotional Crack (screenplay). The latter was screened at the African Film Festival in New York City. She is also known for Yoruba language pictures and is a prominent figure in that industry.

Isong's films featured early performances by Nollywood actors, including Stephanie Okereke and Dakore Egbuson.

In 2014, Isong directed her first feature film Champagne, which had its premiere at the Silverbird Galleria in Victoria Island, Lagos. In August 2015, she released the film Code of Silence, her second directed feature film which she also produced, in collaboration with the Royal Arts Academy and Nollywood Workshop. The film, which deals with rape in Nigeria, stars Makida Moka, Patience Ozokwor, Ini Edo, and Omoni Oboli.

Isong has served as a speaker at the Afrinolly masterclass series and also as a judge for the MTN Afrinolly short film competition in 2013.

== Legacy ==
Isong has been described as a maverick in the New Nollywood movement which is categorized by filmmakers who are not just interested in producing films, but in creating substantial and artful works. She has collaborated with different writers such as Rita Onwurah, Karyn Udeh, Toiyoabasi Ekong, Jane Nwachukwu, and Vivian Chiji and her films have featured actors including Adesua Etomi, Nancy Isime and Daniel Etim Effiong. These films are usually categorised by an extra effort made by the filmmakers to ensure not only the methods but also the tools of production employed by the filmmakers are of substantial quality. It is no longer about production for the sake of production but for art's sake. These films are also made to have domestic and international appeal as they are usually released in Nigerian and foreign cinemas. This shift from home video production to cinema viewing is also a category of this New Nollywood movement.

Isong is also known for her role in founding the Royal Arts Academy in 2010 and her subsequent role as the academy's CEO. The Royal Arts Academy which she started with Uduak Oguamanam, Anietie Isong, and actress Monalisa Chinda, is based in Surulere, Lagos State, Nigeria. Its mandate is to empower students by giving them the necessary tools required to take part in all aspects of film creation and production preparing them to compete in both the Nigerian and international film industries. Students are also given opportunities to win funding to produce films for public release.

== Personal life ==
Isong is known to be private and rarely grants interviews. This, according to her, is because she wishes her work to be consumed on its merits alone without her personal life influencing her viewers. Isong is married to Misodi Akama, with whom she has twins born in 2016.

== Filmography ==
Isong's film credits include:

=== Producer ===
Year	Film title
2024	Deafening Silence
2023	Yes to Forever
2022	Dance with Me
2021	A Bitter Pill
2020	Special Jollof
2019	Your Dream Girl
2018	Mr. & Mrs. Right
2017	Body Language
2016	Ayamma
2015	Don't Cry For Me
2014	Apaye
2014	Knocking on Heaven's Door
2013	Forgetting June
2012	Silver Lining
2011	I'll Take My Chances
2010	Kiss and Tell
2010	Bursting Out
2010	Holding Hope
2010	Memories of War
2009	Edikan
2008	Reloaded
2007	A Time To Love
2007	Unfinished Business
2007	Yahoo Millionaire
2006	Games Men Play
2006	Traumatised
2005	Behind Closed Doors
2005	Darkest Night
2005	Endless Lies
2005	Games Women Play
2005	Girls in the Hood
2005	I Feel U
2005	Men Do Cry
2004	Critical Decision
2004	For Real
2004	Masterstroke
2004	Promise Me Forever
2003	Private Sin
1996	Breaking Point
1994	Jezebel

=== Writer ===
Year	Film title
2011	I'll Take My Chances
2008	Bursting Out
2008	Heartbeats
2008	Reloaded
2007	A Time to Love
2007	Unfinished Business
2007	Yahoo Millionaire
2006	Games Men Play
2005	Blind Obsession
2005	Darkest Night
2005	Fragile Pain
2005	I Feel U
2004	Enslaved
2004	Promise Me Forever
2003	Emotional Crack
1994	Jezebel

=== Director ===
Year	Film title
2014	Champagne
2015	Code of Silence

== Awards and nominations ==
Awards received by Isong include:

- ZAFAA Awards, in the category of Best Producer for the film Memories of my Heart (2010).
- Wow Divas, Outstanding Contribution to Raising Awareness, Understanding and Hope to those Affected by Autism Spectrum Disorder and Advocating for them through her film Silver Lining (2012).
- ELOY Awards, Best Movie Producer of the Year for I'll Take My Chances (2011).
- Best of Nollywood, Special Recognition Award.
- Ntanla Awards, Industry Merit Awards.
- Nigeria's Integrity Film Awards (HomeVida) in the category Family/Child Friendly Category for the film Knocking on the Heavens Door (2014).
- Africa Movie Awards in the category of Best Scriptwriter for the film Reloaded (2008).
- City People Awards in the categories of Best Producer of the Year, and Best Screenplay for the film Reloaded (2008).

== See also ==
- List of Nigerian film producers
