= Keppy Ekpenyong =

Nigerian actor

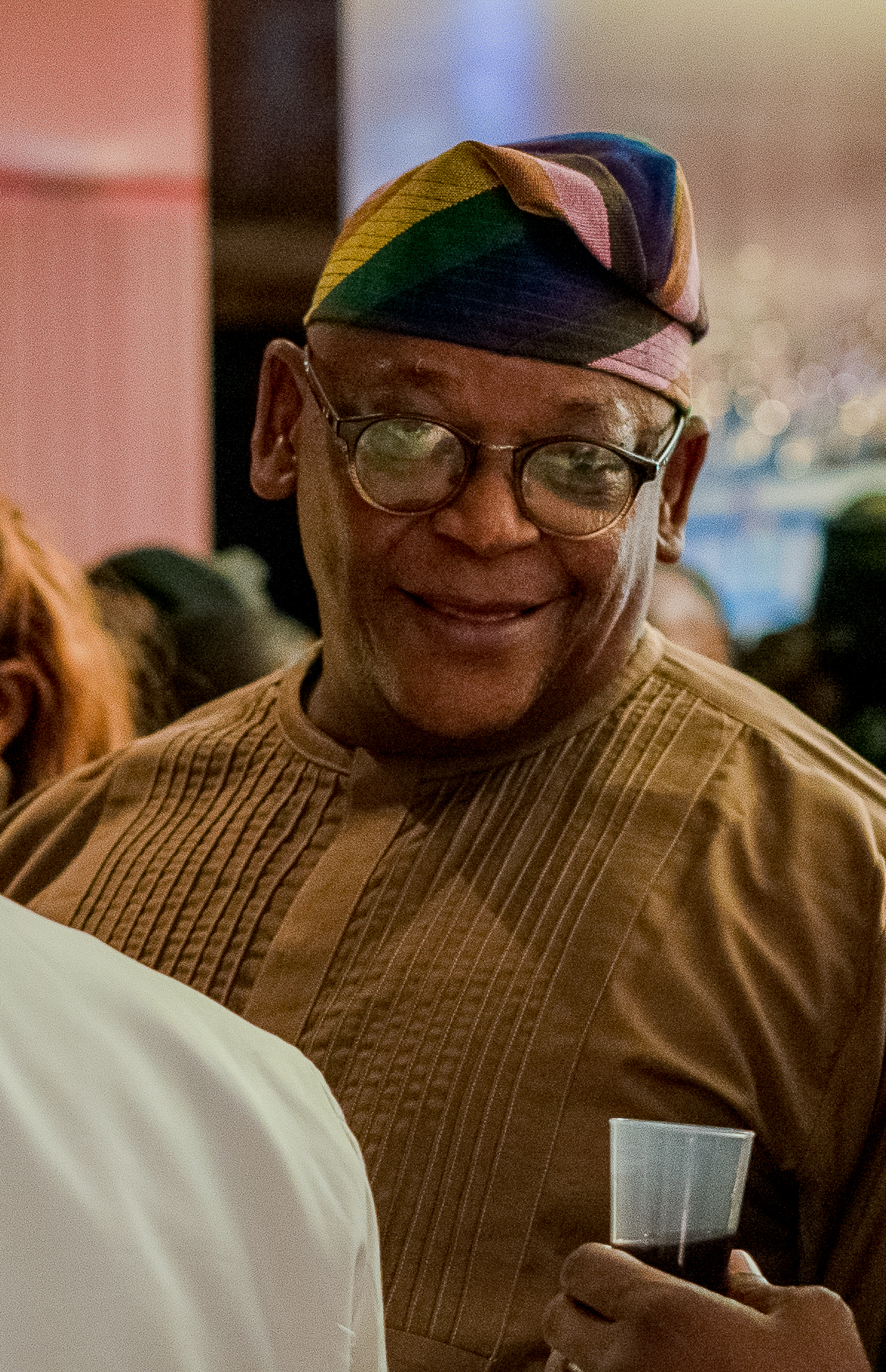
- Keppy Ekpenyong at 2021 AMA Award
- Born: Keppy Ekpenyong Edet Bassey-Inyang; 21 March; Lagos State, Nigeria
- Education: University of Calabar and University of Lagos
- Occupation: Actor

Keppy Ekpenyong Edet Bassey-Inyang is a Nigerian actor who received a commendation award from the Actors Guild of Nigeria in 2018 for his contributions to Nollywood.

== Early life and education ==
Ekpenyong was born on 21 March in Military Hospital, Yaba, Lagos State. He hails from Akwa-Ibom State, a southern region of Nigeria that is predominantly occupied by minority tribes. Ekpenyong received his education from primary level to tertiary level in Nigeria. He attended Corona Schools in Crèche, Ikoyi and Corona School in Victoria Island. He attended Government College Ojo secondary school where he obtained his West African Senior School Certificate. Ekpenyong attended the University Of Calabar In Cross River State and obtained a Bachelor of Arts Degree in Linguistics and in 1982 obtained a Masters's Degree in International Law and Diplomacy from the University of Lagos.

== Career ==
Ekpenyong began acting during his NYSC service with the NTA. He functioned In the Programmes Department and worked as an intern under the supervision of Nigerian ace director; Tade Ogidan. In 1987 and 1988 he was trained and involved in Drama, Script-Writing, Voice- Over, Producing, and Presenting. After his NYSC program he was featured in the soap opera Ripples where he played airline pilot Hassan Suleman. When the Nigerian movie industry began to blossom he switched from soap opera to home videos. In 1991, he co-produced a movie titled Unforgiven Sin.

In 2018, the 10th BON edition award show was hosted by Ekpenyong and Nigerian female comedian Helen Paul.

== Awards ==
- Ekpenyong won City People Movie Lifetime Achievement Award at the City People Entertainment Awards.
- Commendation Award (2018) by Actors Guild of Nigeria.

== Personal life ==
Ekpenyong is married and has two children.

== Selected filmography ==
- Glamour Girls (1994)
- Tears for Love (1995)
- Magic Money (1998) as Collins
- Amadas (1998) as Dagogo
- Black Mamba (2002)
- Princess Buttem (2003)
- Turn Table (2004)
- Schemers: Bad Babes (2004) as Gbenga
- Little Angel (2004)
- Dark Secret (2004)
- Too Much Money (2005)
- The Barons (2005)
- Emotional Hazard (2005) as The Star
- Anini (2005)
- Total Control (2006)
- Lady of Faith (2006)
- The Accursed (2007)
- On Bended Knees (2007)
- Life Bullet (2007)
- Double Game (2007)
- Changing Faces (2008) as Bade Cole
- Smoke & Mirrors (2008) as Akin
- Inale (2010) as Prince Agaba
- Conversations at Dinner (2013) as Uncle Buchi
- ...When Love Happens (2014) as Tunde Bankole-Smith
- St. Mary (2014) as Don Daddy
- 93 Days (2016) as Patrick Oliver Sawyer
- Hire A Man (2017) as Mr. Lawson
- Nneka the Pretty Serpent (2020) as Tega Oghenekaro
- Blood Sisters (2022) as Ifeanyi
- Ije Awele (2022) as Obinna Okpara
- Teni's Big Day (2023) as Mr. Lawson
- The House of Secrets (2023) as General Sanni
- Funmilayo Ransome-Kuti (2024)
- The Weekend (2024) as Meki
- Ms. Kanyin (2025) as Uti's Father

=== TV series ===
- Dere (TV Series, 2017)
- King of Boys: The Return of the King (2021) as President Mumusa

== See also ==
- List of Nigerian actors
- List of Nigerian film producers
