= 5ive (web series) =

Nigerian web series

- Written by: Michael Osuji; Tosyn Bucknor; Jovi Babs
- Starring: Ini Dima-Okojie; KC Ejelonu; Udoka Oyeka; Baaj Adebule; Asa'ah Samuel
- Country of origin: Nigeria
- Original language: English

Production
- Running time: ~ 20 minutes

Original release
- Release: November 3, 2016

5ive is a 2016 Nigerian web series, starring Asa'ah Samuel, Ini Dima-Okojie, KC Ejelonu, Udoka Oyeka, and Baaj Adebule. The series debut was on November 3, 2016.

== Plot ==
It tells a story about the relationship that exist among five friends and the day to day challenges they face.

== Cast ==
- Asa'ah Samuel
- Ini Dima-Okojie
- Baaj Adebule
- KC Ejelonu
- Samuel Ajiobola
- Ndubuisi Donald
- Udoka Oyeka
- Abimola Ademoye

== Reception ==
The production quality and determination of the crew was identified as positives. The presence of Dima-Okojie was also noted as a plus in the series.
