= Munachi Abii =

Nigerian Dj and film maker and rapper (born 1987)

Muna
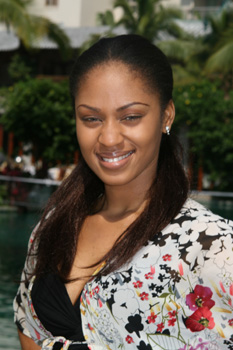
- Abii in 2007
- Born: Munachi Gail Teresa Abii; 5 November 1987 (age 38); Port Harcourt, Rivers State, Nigeria
- Education: Benson Idahosa University
- Occupations: DJ; Rapper singer Songwriter actress Model
- Years active: 2005-present
- Height: 5 ft 7 in (1.70 m)
- Title: Most Beautiful Girl in Nigeria (MBGN) 2007

Munachi Gail Teresa Abii , now referred to as Sunrise , is a Nigerian DJ, rapper, model, actress and beauty pageant titleholder who won the Most Beautiful Girl in Nigeria in 2007. She was a cast member of Living in Bondage: Breaking Free.

== Life ==
=== Early life and pageantry ===
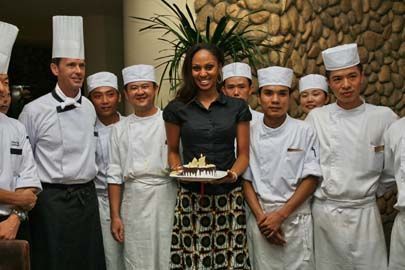
Muna celebrating her birthday in China.

Abii was born and raised in Port Harcourt, Rivers State, Nigeria. She had her secondary education at Federal Government Girls' College, Abuloma. She proceeded to Benson Idahosa University, where she obtained a degree in international relation.

Abii, at age 20, while studying in the university, won the Most Beautiful Girl in Nigeria pageant. In an interview with Vanguard in 2009, she disclosed that she worked with Matilda Kerry to raise awareness for cervical cancer.

=== Musical career ===
Abii performed with Specimen A, a rap group based in PorthHarcourt. In April 2012 she released two singles:"Here To Stay" and "Down Down Low". Abii also performed with Ijaw Boys as a guest artist. She has written songs for artists such as J. Martins and Waje, and has appeared in several music videos, among them, P Square's "Ifunanya".

In June 2010, Abiii signed with RMG record label. She worked on her debut album, The Goddess, The Hustler.

Abii represented Nigeria at a televised BET Cypher for the BET Awards in 2011.

=== Acting ===
In 2019, Abii featured in Living in Bondage: Breaking Free. She starred in Finding Hubby (2020) and Obsession (2022).

=== Endorsement ===
In 2011, Abii signed an endorsement deal with Unilever as a model for Lux soap and featured in a commercial for the brand. After shooting the video for her feature on Michael Word's Pop Sugar, she co-presented the television series Malta Guinness Street Dance Africa.

== Awards and nominations ==
Year	Award ceremony	Category	Film	Result	Ref
2020	Best of Nollywood Awards	Best Kiss in a Movie	Living in Bondage (Breaking Free)	Nominated	
