= Wale Adenuga =

Nigerian former cartoonist/publisher (born 1950)

Wale Adenuga MFR
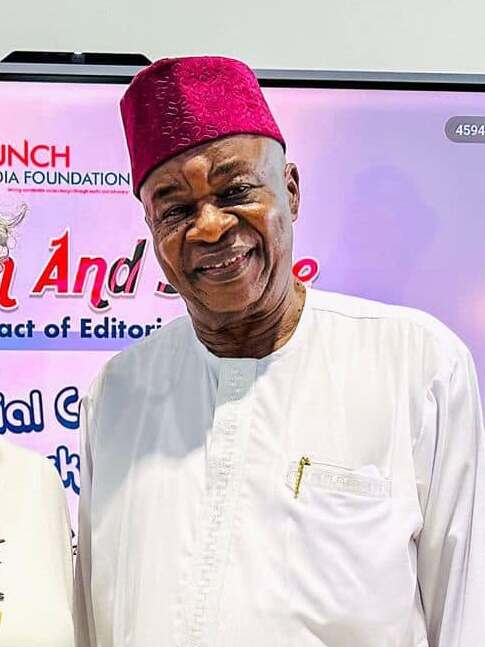
- Adenuga in 2024
- Born: Wale Adenuga; 24 September 1950 (age 76)
- Education: Kings College Lagos University of Lagos
- Occupations: Cartoonist; Publisher; Producer
- Notable work: Super Story; Papa Ajasco
- Spouse: Ehiwenma Adenuga (m. 1975)

Wale Adenuga (born 24 September 1950) is a Nigerian former cartoonist/publisher and currently series producer, best known for the productions Ikebe Super, Binta and Friends, and Super Story, as well their televised versions through his production company WAP.

== Early life ==
The son of a tobacco merchant, Adenuga was raised in Ibadan and attended the Ibadan City Academy, where he obtained his O-Level certificate, before proceeding to King's College, Lagos for his higher school certificate where he formed a pop band, which disbanded upon their secondary school completion.

== Publishing ==
Adenuga studied Business Administration at the University of Lagos in 1971 and worked for the cartoon section of the Campus' Magazine where he was soon made Chief Cartoonist. In 1975, after graduation and youth service in Bendel, his comic Ikebe Super was launched, introducing several iconic characters, including womaniser Papa Ajasco, illiterate Pa Jimoh, and playboy Boy Alinco. A leading female character, promiscuous gold-digger Miss Pepeiye, was later introduced. Adenuga's other magazines were Super Story, which focused on satirical issues and Binta, a children's publication.

== Film/Television Production ==
In the late 1980s, Nigerian publications were affected by the economic depression, leaving Adenuga with the decision to move from print to electronic media. Before the growth of the film industry, Adenuga had released the celluloid movie Papa Ajasco, which was based on the main character in Ikebe Super, in 1983. Papa Ajasco made history as the first English comedy in an industry that had been dominated by Yoruba productions. A film version of Binta was released in 1995, and two years later the television series Papa Ajasco (formerly The Ajasco Family) was aired on AIT to rave reviews. This small screen version saw the return of the old characters alongside Pa James who was created to avoid offending Muslims. ("We did not want [a Muslim] who did the silly things as Pa Jimoh alone.")

== Institutions ==
On 24 September 1994, Adenuga and his wife Ehiwenma founded Binta International School in Lagos, a foundation dedicated to better education in Nigeria.

In 2004, Adenuga opened the Pencil Film and Television Institute (PEFTI). Its courses include Producing, Directing, and Cinematography. In 2009, the school was featured in De Film Industries van Nigeria, a Danish documentary on the Nigerian film industry.

== Awards ==
- 5 awards at the Nigeria Film Festival, 2002: Best Producer, Best Script Writer, Best Director, Best Television Drama, and Best Socially Relevant Television Production.
- Member of the Order of the Federal Republic (MFR), 2009

== Personal life ==
Adenuga has been married to Ehiwenma since 1975.

== See also ==
- List of Nigerian film producers
