= Namaste Wahala =

2020 Nigerian romantic comedy film

- Promotional poster
- Directed by: Hamisha Daryani Ahuja
- Written by: Hamisha Daryani Ahuja
- Screenplay by: Diche Enuwa; Temitope Bolade-Akinbode
- Produced by: Hamisha Daryani Ahuja
- Starring: Ini Dima-Okojie; Ruslaan Mumtaz; Hamisha Daryani Ahuja; Richard Mofe-Damijo; Joke Silva
- Production company: Forever 7 Entertainment
- Distributed by: Netflix
- Release dates: 1 December 2020 (Nigeria); 14 February 2021 (Netflix)
- Running time: 106 minutes
- Country: Nigeria
- Languages: English; Hindi; Nigerian Pidgin

Namaste Wahala (lit. 'Hello Trouble' (Note: Namaste is "hello" in Hindi, while wahala means "trouble" in a number of Nigerian languages, including Nigerian Pidgin.)) is a 2020 Nigerian cross-cultural romantic comedy film produced, written and directed by Hamisha Daryani Ahuja on her directorial debut. The film stars Ini Dima-Okojie and Ruslaan Mumtaz in the lead roles.

This film was hailed as the first major collaboration between Bollywood and Nollywood which are two of the biggest film industries in the world.

The film is based on relationship between an Indian man and a Nigerian woman who defy the odds despite their different backgrounds and cultures. It had limited theatrical release in Nigeria on 1 December 2020 and opened to positive reviews from critics. The film was globally streamed via Netflix on 14 February 2021 coinciding with the Valentine's Day and received mixed reviews.

== Plot ==
Raj–an Indian-born investment banker based in Lagos–falls in love with Didi, a Nigerian pro bono lawyer who works for her friend Leila's NGO. The couple keep their relationship under wraps as Didi's father, Ernest, prefers his employee, Somto, as a suitor. He also disapproves of Didi's commitment to the NGO as opposed to dedication to his powerful law firm. After dating for three months, Raj introduces himself to Didi's family who are shocked to discover he is Indian, as Didi had not informed them beforehand.

Didi seeks justice for fellow NGO volunteer, Jane, who has been physically assaulted by Raymond, Ernest's major client's son. She refuses to drop the case when Ernest reminds her of his business ties with Raymond's family, choosing to resign from her father's firm instead. Raymond is represented by Preemo, Didi's scheming nemesis who constantly taunts her legal experience and is bent on securing a superior position with Ernest's firm. Raymond denies having attacked Jane, claiming she had attempted to murder him in a hotel corridor instead. Unfortunately, the only proof of Jane's innocence has mysteriously disappeared as Preemo has destroyed the CCTV footage. Didi is furious, and after accusing Ernest and his firm of choosing monetary gain over moral principles she leaves the family home for Raj's apartment.

Raj's mother Meera is horrified upon meeting Didi during a surprise visit to Nigeria, and is against the relationship due to their cultural differences. Although Meera reluctantly agrees to stay in Raj's apartment with her son and his girlfriend, she remains hostile towards Didi, resulting in several clashes between the two women including a comical incident involving Raj who is torn between Meera's home-cooked meals and Didi's instant Indomie, but Didi refuses to show intimidation.

Didi's mother Shola longs for her daughter to return home, but her equally stubborn husband refuses to appease Didi's ego. After Didi's other friend Angie reveals her whereabouts, Shola storms into Raj's apartment where a war of words ensues between her and Meera, although both women disapprove of their children cohabiting. Shola leaves with Didi, but the latter continues to pine for Raj who is still determined to marry his one true love.

Determined to acquire evidence proving Jane's innocence, Didi returns to the hotel to ask Tarun–the hotel manager and Leila's secret admirer–for his assistance. He remains uncooperative at first, but after discovering she is Raj's girlfriend Tarun directs her to the security staff who produce CCTV footage of the attack. Realising Jane is telling the truth, Ernest agrees to Didi's demand that Raymond pay an out-of-court settlement and fires Preemo for perverting the course of justice.

Shola tries to discourage Didi from marrying Raj, claiming her in-laws would never truly accept her until Didi reminds her mother of her own inter-tribal heritage (Ernest and Shola are Igbo and Yoruba respectively), and how they had persevered despite opposition from both their families. Meera maintains her own reservations, believing Didi would never adjust to Indian culture, but Didi's friend Leila—who is also Raj's cousin—assures her aunt that Nigerian and Indian women are alike in various ways. Meera is won over by this revelation, and she and Raj pay a visit to Didi's parents laden with gifts. A sullen Ernest still regards Somto as an appropriate son-in-law until Meera argues that Ernest's smart and hardworking daughter is capable of securing his legacy, and Ernest finally accepts Raj into the family.

The movie ends with Didi and Raj's Bollywood-themed wedding ceremony in Nigeria, attended by their families and well-wishers. A post-credit scene shows Meera and Ernest arguing over whether Raj's family should pay the bride price or Didi's should pay the dowry.

== Cast ==
- Ini Dima-Okojie as Didi, a Nigerian lawyer
- Ruslaan Mumtaz as Raj, an Indian investment banker
- Hamisha Daryani Ahuja as Leila, NGO lawyer, Didi's friend, and Raj's cousin
- Anee Icha as Angie, Didi's other friend
- Richard Mofe-Damijo as Ernest, Nigerian lawyer and Didi's father and boss
- Joke Silva as Shola, Didi's mother
- Sujata Sehgal as Meera, Raj's mother
- Osas Ighodaro as Preemo, Didi's nemesis
- Imoh Eboh as Jane, NGO volunteer
- Chukwuemeka Okoye as Raymond, Preemo's client
- Koye Kekere Ekun as Emma, Raj's friend
- Sailesh Ahuja as Tarun, hotel manager
- Ibrahim Suleiman as Somto, Nigerian lawyer and Didi's admirer
- Broda Shaggi as Taxi driver

== Production ==
The film project was announced as a debut directorial venture by Indian-Nigerian businesswoman turned filmmaker Hamisha Daryani Ahuja. Despite being an Indian, she lived and spent her whole life in Nigeria since her childhood and in an interview with CNN she revealed that she wanted to make a film combining the elements of both Bollywood and Nollywood film industries. Hamisha used her own personal experience living in Nigeria in order to make a love story between the two giant film industries. In addition to her directorial credits, she also landed a supporting role herself in the film and also eventually made her film acting debut.

Although it was touted as the first major collaboration between Bollywood and Nollywood, it became the second film after J. U. D. E. (2017), where both film industries joined hands together in the production. Scenes were shot entirely in Lagos, with the script predominantly in English, along with Hindi and Nigerian Pidgin. The production team had more than 60 individuals across India and Nigeria. The post-production of the film was also completed just before the lockdowns owing to the COVID-19 pandemic.

The official announcement regarding the film was revealed in February 2020 via a first look poster released by the film director on her Instagram account and it soon became one of the most anticipated film releases in Nigeria.

== Release ==
The theatrical release of the film was initially supposed to be on 24 April 2020 but the theatrical release was later pushed back to October 2020 due to the impact of the COVID-19 pandemic. The film again postponed to 1 December 2020 and had a low profile theatrical release in Nigeria with limited seating capacity. Netflix unveiled the trailer for the film on 31 January 2021 and confirmed that it would release as a global Netflix original on 14 February 2021.

== Critical reception ==
Times of India rated the film 2.5 out of 5 stars stating that the film is just an average rom-com film with an Indo-Nigerian twist.

== Soundtrack ==
Namaste Wahala Soundtrack

Soundtrack album by Various artists
- Released: 15 February 2021
- Genres: EDM, Afrobeats
- Length: 19:53
- Label: Namaste Wahala

The soundtrack to the film was released digital for streaming, and downloads on 15 February 2021. Featuring Seyi Shay, Lavita, Hamisha Daryani-Ahuja, Nanya Ijeh, M.I Abaga, DJ Suketu, and Amos Kantiok.

1. "Namaste Wahala" – Seyi Shay, and Lavita (3:16)
2. "Pursuing Happiness" – Hamisha Daryani-Ahuja, Nanya Ijeh, M.I Abaga (4:26)
3. "I Don't Want To Let You Go" - DJ Suketu (3:05)
4. "Heartbreak Song" - Nanya Ijeh (2:45)
5. "Namaste Wahala (Remix)" - Amos Kantiok (3:24)
6. "Namaste Wahala (Remix - Engagement Party)" - DJ Suketu (2:54)
