= Wale Adenuga Productions =

Nigerian TV series magazine

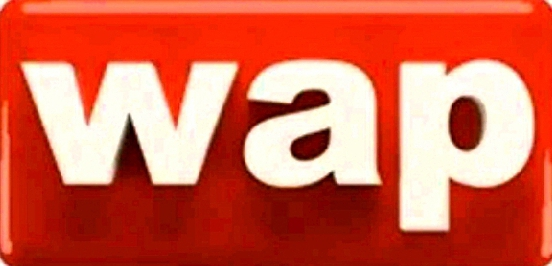
- Type: Conglomerate
- Industry: Film
- Founded: 1978
- Founder: Wale Adenuga
- Headquarters: Lagos, Nigeria
- Key people: (Director) Wale Adenuga jnr
- Products: Wale Film produces

Wale Adenuga Productions Limited (in abbreviation WAPL or WAP) is a Nigerian entertainment and magazine specializes in movie production and TV programs. The industry was the sponsored and owner of Super Story family, Papa Ajasco and Binta.

== Formations ==
The industry was founded and established by Wale Adenuga in 1978. The idea of the formation came to existence when he graduated from University of Lagos in 1974, setting up his on affecting lives of other the natural artistic background he had in school and it is the birth to the popular TV series magazine Nigeria has ever had, the series known as Super Story and Binta having published and sold magazine in half million copies. It also produced popular drama series such as Papa Ajasco in 1983 and Binta My Daughter in 1995. However, it generated more revenue in the movie Papa Ajasco.

The industry has partnership with the National Agency for the Prohibition of Trafficking in Persons, Society for Family Health, National Agency for the Control of AIDS and Securities and Exchange Commission through it social media market value and other industries specifically in Live Stage Performances and TV programmes.

Most of award-winning series platform includes:

- Papa Ajasco
- Super story Family TV Drama
- Nnenna & Friends Children's Edutainment Platforms
- PEFTI Film Institute
- This Life; family drama

== WAPTV ==
WAPTV is a family television entertainment channels. It was established in 2011 but began broadcasting in October 2012 and had top the entertaining channels industries in Nigeria.

== Awards ==
It has may award during the 2016 known as the 6 the edition of Nigerian Broadcasters Merit Awards, winning three award which took up at Barcelona Hotel, Wuse 2, Abuja. The following award received is based on the outstanding performance: Super Story Family as Best TV Series WAPTV, Nnenna and Friends best kiddies youths TV programmes and best Entertainment TV channel. For over 10 years the Superstory TV family drama still remained the most watched TV drama and WAPTV which is the TV channel is a popular TV shown in StarSat, MyTV, StarTimes and Consat.

The PEFTI Film Institute Limited was established by Wale Adenuga Production in 2004, a private films TV production industry helps to established the professional training and disciplines of films, television and music productions.

== Filmography ==
=== Feature films ===
- Papa Ajasco (1983)
- Binta My Daughter (1995)

=== Television ===
- Papa Ajasco (1996–present)
- Super Story (2001–present)
- This Life (2005?)
- Nnenna & Friends (2008)
- The Babington Family (2019)
- Knockout (2019)
- Monica (2019)
- The Village Headmaster (2021)
