= Super Story =

Nigerian television drama series

- Genre: Drama
- Country of origin: Nigeria
- Original language: English

Production
- Production location: Nigeria
- Running time: 45 minutes
- Production company: Wale Adenuga Production

Original release
- Network: WAP TV; NTA
- Release: 2001 – present

Super Story is a Nigerian anthology television drama series created by Wale Adenuga who published the magazine on which the programme is based. The series originally aired on Thursdays by 8 pm on NTA; currently, Super Story is shown on NTA and Wap TV every Thursday by 8 pm and airs on several other terrestrial and cable networks at a later time.

== List of series ==
Season number	Title	Original air date
1	Oh Father! Oh Daughter!	2001
2	Face of Deceit	2002
3	An Eye For An Eye	
4	No Pain No Gain	
5	The Staff	
6	Enough is Enough	
7	Daddy’s Girl	
8	For The Love Of You	
9	The Gods Are Not To Blame	
10	The Grasscutter	
11	The Last Honour	
12	Campus Babes	
13	Hot Business	
14	One Bad Apple	
15	Lion Of Mogun	
16	Omoye	
17	My Uncle My Friend	
18	A New Song	
19	Behind The Smile	
20	Everything It Takes	
21	Because You Loved Me	
22	A Blast From The Past	
23	Invitation To Thunder	
24	Omajuwa	
25	Nnenna	2008
26	More Than A Friend	
27	Evil Genius	
28	The Promise	
29	A Night To Remember	
30	One Man's Poison	
31	Sister Sister	
32	Itohan (A Call To Action)	
33	Is This Love?	
34	Another Chance	
35	Jealous Heart	
36	Too blind To See	2016
37	Corporate Thieves	
38	Rejected Stone	
39	Mother From Hell	
40	Point & Kill	
41	The Other Side	

== Awards ==
It won the best television series at the Nigerian Broadcasters Merit Awards in 2016.
