= Uncutxtra Magazine =

Nigerian quarterly magazine

UncutXtra Magazine
- Editor: Omobolanle Valentina Adigun
- Categories: Entertainment
- Publisher: Creatrix Empire
- Country: United Kingdom, Nigeria
- Based in: United Kingdom
- Language: English
- Website: https://uncutxtramagazines.com/
- ISSN: 2635-1706

UncutXtra is a UK-based quarterly fashion, entertainment and lifestyle magazine that covers many topics, including haute couture fashion, beauty, food, books and societal issues. UncutXtra has featured numerous actors, musicians, and other notable celebrities. Its first issue was published on October 2020, featuring Dorathy Bachor. In its issues, the magazine features includes Paul Onwanibe, Whitemoney, Mr Macaroni, MC Lively, amongst others.

== History ==
=== 2020: The Formative years ===
Emmanuel Alade, a UK-based Nigerian architect, founded UncutXtra Magazine in 2019. It was founded as an analysis-based journal with its first issue released in July 2020. The first issue was published with a cover price of US$3.87 and featured Grammy winner Burna Boy on the cover. Most of the contents that made up the first issue were compilations of critical analyses around the niche of entertainment, lifestyle, and fashion.

Alade’s intention was to create a publication that offered intricate detailing of all things related to entertainment, fashion, lifestyle, top African acts, and emerging talent within Africa and beyond. To this end, the first issue explored content such as how one of Africa’s biggest names, Burna Boy took the world by storm with the release of his fourth studio album, African Giant which earned him his first nomination at the Grammys. This includes detailing around legendary figures such as Fela Anikulapo Kuti, founder of Afrobeat, and world-class fashion events like the New York Fashion Week 2020. At its inception, it narrowed its content majorly around Nigerian acts before upscaling to include blacks around the world. Alade still maintains that the first issue was a test-run that proved successful.

=== 2020: The Breakthrough ===
One of the most watched reality TV shows in Africa is Big Brother Nigeria. Having gained attention as one of the largest empowerment program for thousands of youths, Emmanuel Alade decided to earmark an issue dedicated to BBNaija as his own way of celebrating and prioritizing outstanding initiatives and creatives as regards electronic media and entertainment on the continent.

It is to this end that the magazine had the first runner up of BBNaija Season 5 on the cover in the person of Dorathy Bachor. Her appearance on the cover was a turning point for the UncutXtra brand. Aside the critical acclaim it enjoyed; the second issue went on to dominate sales. This is despite the increase in price to 6.20 pounds. Former MTN executive who went on to join the UncutXtra team as business associate, Aduraseyi Oluwagbeyide maintains that Dorathy’s edition remains one of the brand’s bestselling issues. Industry experts also aver that the magazine must have enjoyed such outstanding success owing to the incorporation of one of the largest youth movements in African history -- End SARS. Some notable names that featured in the magazine include Tosin Oshinowo, the young female architect behind Maryland Mall, Lagos, Nigeria.

=== 2021: The Direction ===
At the late hours of 2020, the magazine began to have a sense of direction as regards timing and date of publication. Following the directive given by founder, Emmanuel Alade, UncutXtra Magazine established itself as a quarterly publication with each issue released in January, April, July, and October. Each issue had a central focus. The issue released in January was termed “Influential Issue”. This follows the “Entrepreneurial Issue” released in April, and then the “Health and Beauty Issue” released in July, as well as the “BBNaija Issue” released in October and the Influential issue released in 2025 which features Chioma Chukwuka.

At the start of 2021, the magazine announced two of Nigeria’s biggest comedians on the cover of its third issue namely MC Lively and Mr Macaroni. This is alongside featuring prolific movie producer, Kunle Afolayan and Zanna Van Djik, UK’s top fitness influencer. In April 2021, the UncutXtra team released its fourth issue featuring fashion icon and entrepreneur, Toyin Lawani on the cover under the caption, “The Magnetic Force of A Woman in Business”. This is including the likes of Lizzy Jay, Shae Universe, Temilayo Abodunrin, Chinyere M. Ugokwe, and Queen Madiva who made it to the magazine as featured star. Adeola Diiadem was also announced as cover on the magazine’s first “Health and Beauty” issue. This is alongside featured stars on the issue like ex-BBNaija housemate, Kemen, and Namibian skincare expert, Tamarind Nott.

The critical acclaim of the magazine was further emboldened by the announcement of former copyeditor and columnist for Net NG, Nelson Okoh as Editor. His first issue with the UncutXtra brand featured BBNaija Season 6 winner, Hazel Oyeze Onou, popularly known as Whitemoney on the cover. The release of the issue in October 2021, the same month Whitemoney left the Big Brother House, was a huge milestone for the UncutXtra brand with several media houses churning out numerous reportage of the cover story including BellaNaija, Guardian Life, News Telegraph, Independent NG, and a host of others. The sixth issue equally had BBNaija Season 5 winner, Laycon as a featured star on the magazine, as well as ex-BBNaija S6 housemate, Kayvee.

=== 2022-2025: The Expansion ===
Having featured more Nigerians on the cover, the UncutXtra brand made a conscious effort to include people of color from other parts of Africa on the cover to retain their status as the number one African entertainment and lifestyle magazine. To this end, the magazine made its first international breakthrough with Kenya’s top influential personality, Betty Kyallo on the cover of its influential issue in 2022. The likes of popular Nigerian skit maker, Taaooma, Grammy recognized producers, Rexxie and P.Priime, as well as winner of Pulse TV food influencer of the year, Ify Monye made guest appearances on the issue. In April 2022, Ghana’s biggest blogger, Ameyaw Debrah was announced as cover star for the magazine’s entrepreneurial issue. According to the editor, this issue is important because it marks UncutXtra Magazine’s efforts to strengthen the mutual cord that binds all Africans even as it beams the lights on ingenious African creatives and startups in the business of entertainment and electronic media. The propagation of Ameyaw’s issue followed with series of media rounds in stations such as Joy FM fronted by publisher, Emmanuel Alade who doubles as the founder of Afrobeatsglobal and Creatrix Empire.

In July 2025, the 19th edition of the UncutXtra was released, tagged “The Influential Edition” and it features award-winning Nollywood actress Chioma Chukwuka who is the star of the edition and other notable personalities.
