= Big Brother Naija season 8 =

Nigerian television show

Big Brother Naija
- Season 8
- Presented by: Ebuka Obi-Uchendu
- No. of days: 71
- No. of housemates: 20
- Winner: Ilebaye Odiniya
- Runner-up: Mercy Eke

Release
- Original network: Africa Magic
- Original release: 23 July – 1 October 2023

Series chronology
- ← Previous; Season 7 Next → Season 9

Big Brother Naija Season 8, also known as Big Brother Naija: All Stars, is the eighth season of the Nigerian reality show Big Brother. It premiered on Sunday 23 July 2023 on DStv channel 198 and GOtv channel 29. Ebuka Obi-Uchendu returned as the host for the 7th consecutive time.

This show had selected housemates and fan favourites from previous editions of the show and included See Gobbe, Double Wahala, Pepper Dem, Lockdown, Shine Ya Eye and Level Up.

According to the organizers of the show MultiChoice, the winner of the season is expected to win a total of ₦120 million grand prize.

== Housemates ==
Housemates	Age on Entry	Occupation	Residence/Birthplace	Day entered	Day exited	Status
Ilebaye Odiniya; Level Up	22	Model	Kogi State	0	70	Winner
Mercy Eke; Pepper Dem	32	Video vixen, ambassador, businesswoman	Lagos State/Imo State	0	70	Runner-up
Cynthia "Cee-C" Nwadiora; Double Wahala	30	Lawyer, filmmaker, businesswoman	Enugu State	0	70	3rd Place
Adekunle Tobilola Olopade; Level Up	28	Digital marketing consultant	Lagos State	0	70	4th Place
Pere Egbi; Shine Ya Eye	37	Executive producer	Warri	0	70	5th Place
Ikechukwu Sunday "Cross" Okonkwo; Shine Ya Eye	32	Fitness enthusiast, philanthropist	Kano State/Lagos State	0	70	6th Place
Angel Agnes Smith; Shine Ya Eye	23	Influencer, podcaster	Akwa Ibom State	0	63	Evicted
Somadina Anyama; See Gobbe	31	Entertainer	Lagos State/Imo State	0	63	Evicted
Venita Akpofure; Pepper Dem	36	Actress	Delta State/UK	0	63	Evicted
Asogwa Alexandra Amuche Sandra; Double Wahala	27	Media personality	Enugu State	0	56	Evicted
Emuobonuvie "Neoenergy" Akpofure; Lockdown	29	Entertainment entrepreneur	Delta State	0	56	Evicted
Kola "Sholzy" Oburoh; Pepper Dem	42	Model & Club Manager	Delta State/Johannesburg	28	56	Left
Hazel Oyeze "Whitemoney" Onou; Shine Ya Eye	31	Businessman, Artist	Lagos	0	56	Evicted
Doyinsola Anuoluwapo David; Level Up	27	Medical radiographer	Ondo State	0	49	Evicted
Chinonso "Kim Oprah" Opara; Pepper Dem	27	TV Host, Travel Enthusiast, Business Woman	Lagos/Imo State	28	49	Left
Nelson "Prince Nelson" Enwerem; Lockdown	28	Model, fashion designer, interior decorator	Warri	28	42	Left
Steve Ikechukwu "Ike" Onyema; Pepper Dem	30	Model	Texas/Imo State	0	42	Evicted
Lucy Essien; Lockdown	32	Entrepreneur	Lagos	28	42	Left
Oluwaseyi Awolowo; Pepper Dem	34	Media influencer, businessman	Ogun State	0	42	Evicted
Chukwuemeka "Frodd" Okoye; Pepper Dem	32	Realtor, club owner, lifestyle promoter	Anambra State	0	35	Evicted
Tolani "Tolanibaj" Shobajo; Lockdown	31	DJ, actress, clothing brand owner	Lagos State	0	35	Evicted
Terseer "Kiddwaya" Waya; Lockdown	30	Businessman	Benue State	0	28	Evicted
Uriel Anita Oputa; See Gobbe	33	Fitness enthusiast	Lagos State/United Kingdom	0	21	Evicted
Linda "Princess" Onyejekwe; Double Wahala	30	Businesswoman	New York City/Enugu State	0	14	Evicted

The launch night (23 July) is marked as Day 0. The day after is Day 1.

== Voting history and nominations table ==
	Normal Nominations	Pardon Me Please				Normal Nominations						Nominations & votes received
	Week 1	Week 2	Week 3	Week 4	Week 5	Week 6	Week 7	Week 8	Week 9	Week 10		Nominations & votes received
Head of House	Adekunle	Kiddwaya	Ike	Mercy Eke	Soma	Doyin	Sholzy	Cross	Ilebaye	Cross		Nominations & votes received
Ilebaye	~~Tolanibaj~~	Doyin	Did Not Vote	Doyin	Angel	Seyi; Lucy; Ike	Venita; Kim Oprah; Pere	Neoenergy; Cee-C; Whitemoney	Soma; Angel	Winner (Day 70)		21
Mercy Eke	~~Pere~~	Cee-C	Frodd	Doyin	Angel	Pere; Adekunle; Lucy	Neoenergy; Doyin; Kim Oprah	Pere; Adekunle; Neoenergy	Angel; Venita	Runner-up (Day 70)		13
Cee-C	~~Seyi~~	Ilebaye	Did Not Vote	Doyin	Ilebaye	Seyi; Adekunle; Prince Nelson	Ilebaye; Doyin; Soma	Adekunle; Pere; Ilebaye	Adekunle; Soma	3rd place (Day 70)		9
Adekunle	~~Princess~~	Soma	Venita	Doyin	Cross	Angel; Whitemoney; Prince Nelson	Mercy Eke; Alex; Doyin	Cee-C; Alex; Mercy Eke	Angel; Soma	4th place (Day 70)		20
Pere	~~Princess~~	Cross	Cross	Ilebaye	Cross	Seyi; Venita; Sholzy	Alex; Ilebaye; Neoenergy	Alex; Soma; Mercy Eke	Adekunle; Venita	5th place (Day 70)		11
Cross	~~Doyin~~	Soma	Kiddwaya	Neoenergy	Pere	Lucy; Ilebaye; Adekunle	Soma; Cee-C; Ilebaye	Mercy Eke; Cee-C; Alex	Angel; Soma	6th place (Day 70)		10
Angel	~~Seyi~~	Soma	Frodd	Doyin	Mercy Eke	Lucy; Seyi; Ike	Kim Oprah; Venita; Doyin	Whitemoney; Sholzy; Ilebaye	Venita; Adekunle	Evicted (Day 63)		20
Soma	~~Venita~~	Uriel	Angel	Adekunle	Angel	Pere; Mercy Eke; Lucy	Doyin; Ilebaye; Mercy Eke	Sholzy; Ilebaye; Whitemoney	Pere; Mercy Eke	Evicted (Day 63)		21
Venita	~~Ilebaye~~	Ike	Adekunle	Adekunle	Cross	Angel; Ilebaye; Prince Nelson	Doyin; Kim Oprah; Mercy Eke	Alex; Cee-C; Mercy Eke	Soma; Pere	Evicted (Day 63)		17
Alex	~~Ike~~	Soma	Seyi	Doyin	Angel	Sholzy; Pere; Adekunle	Neoenergy; Doyin; Venita	Sholzy; Adekunle; Venita	Evicted (Day 56)			10
Neoenergy	~~Whitemoney~~	Tolanibaj	Tolanibaj	Ilebaye	Cross	Kim Oprah; Whitemoney; Ike	Kim Oprah; Ilebaye; Angel	Alex; Cee-C; Mercy Eke	Evicted (Day 56)			15
Sholzy	Not In House				Exempt	~~Lucy~~; ~~Angel~~	~~Soma~~; ~~Kim Oprah~~	~~Adekunle~~; ~~Alex~~; ~~Angel~~	Left (Day 56)			6
Whitemoney	~~Ilebaye~~	Mercy Eke	Alex	Cross	Cross	Ike; Adekunle; Lucy	Cee-C; Ilebaye; Venita	Neoenergy; Soma; Cee-C	Evicted (Day 56)			6
Doyin	~~Venita~~	Ilebaye	Adekunle	Ilebaye	Angel	Venita; Seyi; Sholzy	Venita; Neoenergy; Soma	Evicted (Day 49)				18
Kim Oprah	Not In House				Exempt	~~Adekunle~~; ~~Neoenergy~~	~~Doyin~~; ~~Neoenergy~~	Left (Day 49)				7
Prince Nelson	Not In House				Exempt	~~Adekunle~~; ~~Ike~~	Left (Day 42)					5
Lucy	Not In House				Exempt	~~Angel~~; ~~Soma~~	Left (Day 42)					7
Seyi	~~Princess~~	Soma	Frodd	Adekunle	Cross	Angel; Pere; Prince Nelson	Evicted (Day 42)					8
Ike	~~Soma~~	Venita	Frodd	Neoenergy	Angel	Prince Nelson; Angel; Ilebaye	Evicted (Day 42)					7
Frodd	~~Princess~~	Adekunle	Mercy Eke	Doyin	Angel	Evicted (Day 35)						4
Tolanibaj	~~Venita~~	Neoenergy	Neoenergy	Neoenergy	Cross	Evicted (Day 35)						4
Kiddwaya	~~Ilebaye~~	Soma	Alex	Neoenergy	Evicted (Day 28)							1
Uriel	~~Doyin~~	Soma	Tolanibaj	Evicted (Day 21)								1
Princess	~~Venita~~	Soma	Evicted (Day 14)									4
Note	1, 2	3	4	5	6	none						
Black envelope immunity	Mercy Eke	Angel	none	Alex	none	Alex	Adekunle	none	Cee-C	none		
Head of House immunity	Adekunle	Kiddwaya	Ike	Mercy Eke	Soma	Doyin	Sholzy	Cross	Ilebaye	none		
Pardon Me Please immunity	none	Soma	Frodd	Doyin	none					none		
Against public vote	none	Adekunle; Alex; Cee-C; Cross; Doyin; Frodd; Ike; Ilebaye; Mercy Eke; Neoenergy; Pere; Princess; Seyi; Tolanibaj; Uriel; Venita; Whitemoney	Adekunle; Alex; Angel; Cee-C; Cross; Doyin; Ilebaye; Kiddwaya; Mercy Eke; Neoenergy; Pere; Seyi; Soma; Tolanibaj; Uriel; Venita; Whitemoney	Adekunle; Angel; Cee-C; Cross; Frodd; Ike; Ilebaye; Kiddwaya; Neoenergy; Pere; Seyi; Soma; Tolanibaj; Venita; Whitemoney	Adekunle; Alex; Angel; Cee-C; Cross; Doyin; Frodd; Ike; Ilebaye; Mercy Eke; Neoenergy; Pere; Seyi; Tolanibaj; Venita; Whitemoney	Adekunle; Angel; Ike; ~~Lucy~~; Pere; Seyi	Doyin; Ilebaye; ~~Kim Oprah~~; Venita; Whitemoney	Adekunle; Alex; Cee-C; Ilebaye; Mercy Eke; Neoenergy; Whitemoney	Adekunle; Angel; Pere; Soma; Venita	Adekunle; Cee-C; Cross; Ilebaye; Mercy Eke; Pere		
Evicted	none	Princess; 3 of 3 Jury votes to be Evicted	Uriel; 2 of 3 Jury votes to be Evicted	Kiddwaya; 3 of 3 Jury votes to be Evicted	Frodd; 1.22% to save	Seyi; 3.55% to save	Doyin; 17% to save	Neoenergy; 4.36% to save	Venita; 11.27% to save	Cross; 4.6% to win	Pere; 5.82% to win	
Evicted	none	Princess; 3 of 3 Jury votes to be Evicted	Uriel; 2 of 3 Jury votes to be Evicted	Kiddwaya; 3 of 3 Jury votes to be Evicted	Tolanibaj; 1.55% to save	Ike; 17.76% to save	Kim Oprah; Biggie's choice to evict	Whitemoney; 8.06% to save	Soma; 14.03% to save	Adekunle; 12.61% to win	Cee-C; 23.41% to win	
Evicted	none	Princess; 3 of 3 Jury votes to be Evicted	Uriel; 2 of 3 Jury votes to be Evicted	Kiddwaya; 3 of 3 Jury votes to be Evicted	Tolanibaj; 1.55% to save	Lucy; Biggie's choice to evict	Kim Oprah; Biggie's choice to evict	Alex; 13.41% to save	Angel; 15.88% to save	Mercy Eke; 23.48 to win		
Evicted	none	Princess; 3 of 3 Jury votes to be Evicted	Uriel; 2 of 3 Jury votes to be Evicted	Kiddwaya; 3 of 3 Jury votes to be Evicted	Tolanibaj; 1.55% to save	Prince Nelson; Biggie's choice to evict	Kim Oprah; Biggie's choice to evict	Sholzy; Biggie's choice to evict	Angel; 15.88% to save	Mercy Eke; 23.48 to win		
Survived	none	none		Seyi; 2.66% to save Frodd; 3.14% to save Neoenergy; 4.99% to save Venita; 5.31% to save Ike; 5.46% to save Cross; 5.47% to save Whitemoney; 5.78% to save Angel; 6.84% to save Soma; 7.96% to save Pere; 8.07% to save Adekunle; 11.18% to save Cee-C; 13.98% to save Ilebaye; 15.18% to save	Seyi; 1.65% to save Neoenergy; 2.60% to save Venita; 4.24% to save Doyin; 4.46% to save Ike; 4.52% to save Whitemoney; 4.68% to save Cross; 4.96% to save Angel; 5.10% to save Pere; 6.83% to save Alex; 7.97% to save Adekunle; 8.22% to save Mercy Eke; 11.76% to save Cee-C; 15.09% to save 'Ilebaye; 15.14% to save	Pere; 22.39% to save Adekunle; 28.14% to save Angel; 28.16% to save	Whitemoney; 17.22% to save Venita; 26.16% to save Ilebaye; 39.62% to save	Adekunle; 15.22% to save Mercy Eke; 16.23% to save Cee-C; 17.79% to save Ilebaye; 24.92% to save	Adekunle; 28.08% to save Pere; 30.74% to save	Ilebaye; 30.08% to win		

=== Notes ===
- ^Note 1: While the Head of House, Adekunle, was in his nomination process, Big Brother revealed that nominations were fake and all contestants were safe, but it had to be kept secret to the rest of the house.
- ^Note 2: In week 1, Big Brother announced the black envelope challenge, where housemates had to look through the house for a hidden black envelope, and whoever found it first would be safe from eviction.
- ^Note 3: In week 2, Big Brother announced a nomination twist, called "Pardon Me Please," where the housemates would nominate for immunity from eviction. After this nomination, every housemate apart from the black envelope winner and Head of House would be up for public voting.
- ^Note 4: As part of Cee-C's and Ilebaye's punishments, they were not allowed to vote in the nomination process.
- ^Note 5: Four new houseguests: Lucy, Kim Oprah, Prince Nelson and Sholzy enter the house.
- ^Note 6: Big Brother annulled the Pardon Me Please nominations for Week 5 because Angel and Cross tied with seven nominations each.
