= Big Brother Naija =

Season of television series

Coordinates: 8.88507°N 7.60254°E

- Also known as: Big Brother Nigeria; BBNaija
- Country of origin: Nigeria
- Original language: English
- No. of series: 11

Original release
- Network: Africa Magic (2017–present); M-Net (2006)
- Release: 5 March 2006 – present

Big Brother Naija, formerly known as Big Brother Nigeria, is a Nigerian reality competition television series based on the Big Brother franchise. On the show, contestants live in an isolated house and compete for a large cash prize and other material rewards by avoiding eviction, with viewers voting for their favourite housemates to remain in the competition.

The first season of the show aired on M-Net and DStv Channel 37 from 5 March to 4 June 2006. The voting results were verified by the auditing firm Alexander-Forbes.

== Series overview ==
Season	Subtitle	Launch date	Finale date	Days	Housemates	Winner	Runner-up	Main presenters	Network
Big Brother Nigeria 1	None	5 March 2006	4 June 2006	92	14	Katung Aduwak	Francisca Owumi	Olisa Adibua; Michelle Dede	M-Net; DStv
Big Brother Naija 2	See Gobbe	22 January 2017	9 April 2017	77	14	Michael Efe Ejeba	Bisola Aiyeola	Ebuka Obi-Uchendu	Africa Magic; DStv; GOtv
Big Brother Naija 3	Double Wahala	28 January 2018	22 April 2018	85	20	Miracle Igbokwe	Cynthia "Cee-C" Nwadiora	Ebuka Obi-Uchendu	Africa Magic; DStv; GOtv
Big Brother Naija 4	Pepper Dem	30 June 2019	6 October 2019	99	21	Mercy Eke	Mike Edwards	Ebuka Obi-Uchendu	Africa Magic; DStv; GOtv
Big Brother Naija 5	Lockdown	19 July 2020	28 September 2020	71	20	Olamilekan "Laycon" Agbeleshe	Dorathy Bachor	Ebuka Obi-Uchendu	Africa Magic; DStv; GOtv
Big Brother Naija 6	Shine Ya Eye	24/25 July 2021	3 October 2021	72	26	Hazel Oyeye "Whitemoney" Onou	Roseline Omokhoa "Liquorose" Afije	Ebuka Obi-Uchendu	Africa Magic; DStv; GOtv
Big Brother Naija 7	Level Up	23/24 July 2022	2 October 2022	72	28	Ijeoma Josephina "Phyna"	Brian Chukwuebuka "Bryann" Chiji	Ebuka Obi-Uchendu	Africa Magic; DStv; GOtv
Big Brother Naija 8	All Stars	23 July 2023	1 October 2023	71	24	Ilebaye Odiniya	Mercy Eke	Ebuka Obi-Uchendu	Africa Magic; DStv; GOtv
Big Brother Naija 9	No Loose Guard	28 July 2024	October 2024	71	28	Kingsley "Kellyrae" Sule	Wanni Danbaki	Ebuka Obi-Uchendu	Africa Magic; DStv; GOtv
Big Brother Naija 10	10/10	26/27 July 2025	5 October 2025	72	29	Opeyemi "Imisi" Ayanwale	Precious "Dede" Ashiogwu	Ebuka Obi-Uchendu	Africa Magic; DStv; GOtv
Big Brother Naija 11	See Ya Sef	26 July 2026			24	TBA	TBA		

== Season 1 ==
Big Brother Naija
- Season 1
- Presented by: Olisa Adibua; Michelle Dede
- No. of days: 92
- No. of housemates: 14
- Winner: Katung Aduwak
- Runner-up: Francisca Owumi

Release
- Original network: M-Net; DStv
- Original release: 5 March – 4 June 2006

Series chronology
- Next → Season 2

The first season of the show aired on DStv Channel 37 from 5 March to 4 June 2006. In a twist to the game, two new contestants were introduced on Day 23, much to the excitement of the remaining housemates.

Ebuka, the most popular housemate for several weeks into the show and widely believed to emerge the winner, was the seventh housemate to be evicted; many viewers blame the Joe's Fan Club (JFC) for his eviction. Joe himself was soon evicted.

Big Brother added another twist to the game on Day 79 by cancelling the scheduled nominations and making the housemates believe they will instead be evicted based on their performances on assigned tasks, while in reality, no more evictions were held, and viewers began voting for the winner, who turned out to be 26-year-old Katung Aduwak.

=== Housemates ===
Housemates	Age on entry	Occupation	Residence/Birthplace	Day entered	Day exited	Status
Katung Aduwak	26	Scriptwriter and production assistant	Kaduna	23	92	Winner
Francisca Owumi (Late)	21	Student	Lagos	1	92	Runner-up
Ifeoma "Ify" Ejikeme	29	Entrepreneur	Jos Plateau	1	92	3rd place
Sandra "Sandy" Osigbovo	29	Student	Benin City	23	92	4th place
Frank Konwea	29	Dancer and artiste	Lagos	1	78	Evicted
Joseph "Joe" Ada	32	Flight attendant	Lagos	1	71	Evicted
Helen Eremiokhale	25	Student	Lagos	1	64	Evicted
Chukwuebuka Obi-Uchendu	23	Lawyer	Benin City	1	57	Evicted
Gideon Okeke	22	Graduated	Lagos	1	50	Evicted
Maureen Osuji	23	Student	Lagos (originally Imo State)	1	43	Evicted
Joan Agabi	24	Student	Awagir	1	36	Evicted
Chinedu Amah	24	Self employed	Delta State	1	29	Evicted
Yinka/Adeyinka Oremosu	26	Self employed and musician	Lagos	1	22	Evicted
Ichemeta Ochoga	21	Student	Benue State	1	15	Evicted

=== Nominations table ===
	Week 2	Week 3	Week 4	Week 5	Week 6	Week 7	Week 8	Week 9	Week 10	Week 11	Week 13 Final		Nominations received
Katung	Not in House			Exempt	Ebuka, Frank	Frank, Helen	Frank, Sandy	Helen, Sandy	No; Nominations	Frank, Sandy	Winner (Day 92)		6
Francisca	Ichemeta, Ify	Gideon, Ify	Chinedu, Joseph	Joan, Joseph	Gideon, Ify	Gideon, Helen	Frank, Ify	Helen, Katung	No; Nominations	Frank, Sandy	Runner-up (Day 92)		12
Ify	Chinedu, Ichemeta	Chinedu, Joan	Chinedu, Joan	Francisca, Joan	Francisca, Maureen	Francisca, Gideon	Ebuka, Joseph	Frank, Fransisca	No; Nominations	Frank, Sandy	Third place (Day 92)		21
Sandy	Not in House			Exempt	Gideon, Maureen	Francisca, Gideon	Ebuka, Ify	Fransisca, Ify	No; Nominations	Fransisca, Ify	Fourth place (Day 92)		11
Frank	Francisca, Ichemeta	Francisca, Joseph	Chinedu, Francisca	Helen, Joan	Francisca, Maureen	Fransisca, Gideon	Ebuka, Katung	Katung, Sandy	No; Nominations	Ify, Sandy	Evicted (Day 78)		13
Joseph	Chinedu, Yinka	Frank, Yinka	Chinedu, Helen	Frank, Joan	Frank, Maureen	Ebuka, Gideon	Frank, Ify	Helen, Sandy	No; Nominations	Evicted (Day 71)			20
Helen	Ichemeta, Joseph	Chinedu, Yinka	Chinedu, Ify	Gideon, Ify	Ify, Joseph	Ify, Katung	Joseph, Katung	Joseph, Katung	Evicted (Day 64)				10
Ebuka	Ichemeta, Yinka	Helen, Joseph	Helen, Joseph	Ify, Marureen	Ify, Joseph	Joseph, Sandy	Ify, Joseph	Evicted (Day 57)					5
Gideon	Ichemeta, Yinka	Francisca, Joseph	Francisca, Joseph	Francisca, Joan	Joseph, Sandy	Fransisca, Joseph	Evicted (Day 50)						12
Maureen	Ichemeta, Yinka	Francisca, Yinka	Chinedu, Ify	Fransisca, Ify	Ify, Sandy	Evicted (Day 43)							9
Joan	Ichemeta, Helen	Gideon, Ify	Gidoen, Joseph	Gideon, Maureen	Evicted (Day 36)								8
Chinedu	Ify, Maureen	Maureen, Yinka	Joseph, Maureen	Evicted (Day 29)									10
Yinka	Gideon, Joan	Joseph, Maureen	Evicted (Day 22)										9
Ichemeta	Frank, Yinka	Evicted (Day 15)											8
Notes	none			1	none				2	none	3		
Against public vote	Ichemeta, Yinka	Francisca, Joseph, Yinka	Chinedu, Joseph	Fransisca, Ify, Joan	Ify, Maureen	Fransisca, Gideon	Ebuka, Frank, Ify, Joseph	Helen, Katung, Sandy	Fransisca, Ify, Joseph, Katung, Sandy	Frank, Sandy	Ify, Fransisca, Katung, Sandy		
Evicted	Ichemeta; 57.2% to evict	Yinka; 61.4% to evict	Chinedu; 71.5% to evict	Joan; 45.7% to evict	Maureen; 51.9% to evict	Gideon; 56.4% to evict	Ebuka; 38.4% to evict	Helen; 58.4% to evict	Joseph; 31.2% to evict	Frank; 57.4% to evict	Sandy; 9.4% to win	Ify; 12.7% to win	
Evicted	Ichemeta; 57.2% to evict	Yinka; 61.4% to evict	Chinedu; 71.5% to evict	Joan; 45.7% to evict	Maureen; 51.9% to evict	Gideon; 56.4% to evict	Ebuka; 38.4% to evict	Helen; 58.4% to evict	Joseph; 31.2% to evict	Frank; 57.4% to evict	Fransisca; 26.6% to win		
Survived	Yinka	Joseph; Francisca	Joseph	Ify; Francisca	Ify	Francisca	Frank; Ify; Joseph	Sandy; Katung	Sandy; Ify; Francisca; Katung	Sandy	Katung; 51.3% to win		

=== Notes ===
- ^Note 1: As new Housemates, Katung and Sandy were exempt from the nominations process this week
- ^Note 2: There were no nominations this week. All Housemates faced the public vote, except Frank, who won safety in a task.
- ^Note 3: During the final week, the public voted to win, rather than to evict.

== Season 2 ==
The second season of Big Brother Nigeria (titled Big Brother Naija) premiered 11 years after the first season on 22 January 2017 with 14 housemates; seven male and seven female. The season was sponsored by Nigerian e-commerce company Payporte and hosted by Ebuka Obi-Uchendu, a former housemate from season one. Efe Ejeba from Delta State won the season.

== Season 3 ==
The third season of Big Brother Nigeria (titled Big Brother Naija) premiered on 28 January 2018 with 20 housemates; 10 male and 10 female. The season was sponsored by Nigerian e-commerce company Payporte and hosted by Ebuka Obi-Uchendu. Miracle Igbokwe from Imo State, won the season.

== Season 4 ==
The fourth season of Big Brother Nigeria (titled Big Brother Naija) was the first to be staged in Lagos, Nigeria. The show premiered on 30 June 2019 with 21 housemates and five additional housemates entered the house a month later. In March 2019, Multichoice announced that the show would be broadcast on DSTV channel 198 and Gotv channel 12. Mercy Eke from Imo State won the season, becoming the first female winner of the Nigerian show. She received prizes worth ₦60 million.

== Season 5 ==
The fifth season of Big Brother Nigeria (titled Big Brother Naija) premiered on 19 July 2020 with 20 housemates and lasted 71 days. Olamilekan "Laycon" Agbeleshe from Ogun State won the season and received prizes worth ₦85 million.

== Season 6 ==
The sixth season of Big Brother Nigeria (titled Big Brother Naija) premiered over two nights on 24 July 2021 and 25 July 2021 with 22 housemates. Four additional housemates entered the house on Day 14. Hazel Oyeze "Whitemoney" Onou won the season and received prizes worth ₦90 million.

== Season 7 ==
The seventh season of Big Brother Nigeria (titled Big Brother Naija) premiered over two nights on 23 and 24 July 2022 with 24 housemates. Two additional housemates entered on Day 7, followed by another two on Day 14. Ijeoma Josephina "Phyna" Otabor won the season and received prizes worth ₦100 million.

== Season 8 ==
The eighth season of Big Brother Naija (titled Big Brother Naija: All Stars) premiered on 23 July 2023 with 20 housemates. It included The season featured former housemates and fan favorites from previous seasons of Big Brother Naija. Ilebaye Odiniya won the season and received prizes worth ₦120 million.

== Season 9 ==
The ninth season of Big Brother Naija premiered over two nights on 28 and 29 July 2024 and lasted 71 days, with a total of 28 housemates competing in 14 pairs. Kingsley "KellyRae" Sule won the season and received prizes worth ₦100 million, comprising ₦65 million in cash along with other rewards.

== Season 10 ==
The tenth season of Big Brother Naija premiered over two nights on 26 and 27 July 2025, featuring 29 housemates over a 71-day period. Imisi won the season and received prizes worth ₦150 million, comprising ₦80 million in cash along with other rewards.

== Season 11 ==
The eleventh season premiered on 26 July 2026 on DStv channel 198 and GOtv channel 29 with a record ₦160 million grand prize. Ebuka Obi-Uchendu returned as host for his tenth consecutive season. It featuresd 24 housemates over 72 days. Temitope "Temi Nkem" Chigbue won the season.

== Awards and nominations ==
Year	Award	Category	Result	Ref
2021	Net Honours	Most Popular Event	Won	
2022	African Entertainment Awards USA	Best Reality TV Shows	Nominated	
