= YKB =

YKB may refer to:

- YKB (singer) (Yusuf Oluwo Gbolaga; born 1995), Nigerian musician
- Yoni Ki Baat, an American live performance project (since 2003)
- Yapı ve Kredi Bankası, a Turkish bank (founded 1944)
