= Terseer =

- Gender: Male
- Language: Tiv

Origin
- Word/name: Nigeria
- Meaning: The Lord has added or multiplied

Terseer is a Nigerian masculine given name. Notable people with the surname include:

- Kiddwaya (Terseer Kidd Waya; born 1993), Nigerian entrepreneur and television personality
- Terseer Ugbor (born 1981), Nigerian politician
- Terseer Sam Baki, (Samuel Terseer Baki, born 1977) Nigerian writer, editor and publisher as well as public servant
