= Ilebaye =

Nigerian criminologist and model (born 2004)

- Born: Ilebaye Precious Odiniya; 9 May 2004 (age 22); Kogi State, Nigeria
- Other names: Baye; Gen-Z Baddie
- Education: Salem University
- Occupations: Criminologist; model; actress; television personality
- Years active: 2022–present
- Known for: Winner of the Big Brother Naija season 8
- Television: Big Brother Naija

Ilebaye Precious Odiniya (born 9 May 2004), professionally known as Baye or Gen-Z Baddie, is a Nigerian criminologist, model, actress and television personality. She is best known as the winner of Big Brother Naija season 8.

== Early life ==
Ilebaye is from the Igala tribe in Kogi State, She was born and raised in Okpo, Olamaboro local government area in Kogi State.

She attended Binta International School, Lagos, which is owned by film producer Wale Adenuga, for her secondary school education, where she featured in films like Papa Ajasco, Super Story and Binta & Friends starting from a young age, and Salem University in Lokoja, where she studied criminology and security studies.

== Career ==
Ilebaye began her acting career at a young age, as she played a role in Papa Ajasco and in Nnena and Friends. In 2021, she won the Finest Girl Democracy Nigeria (FGDN) beauty pageant.

=== Big Brother Naija ===
Ilebaye entered the seventh season of Big Brother Naija as the fourth housemate on 23 July 2022, and was evicted in the third week.

On 23 July 2023, Ilebaye was introduced as the 13th housemate for the all star season. During the season finale on 1 October 2023, she was declared the winner, after scoring 30.08% of the final votes ahead of Mercy Eke with 23.48% of the total votes cast. She won the ₦120 million cash prize and other prizes, making her the third woman to win the show.

== Filmography ==
=== Television ===
Year	Title	Role	Notes
2022	Big Brother Naija 7	Contestant	Evicted in week 3
2023	Big Brother Naija 8	Contestant	Won
