= Tukura =

Tukura is a surname. Notable people with the surname include:

- Etsanyi Tukura (born 1997), Nigerian beauty pageant titleholder and TV personality
- Kabir Tukura Ibrahim (born 1984), Nigerian politician
- Michael Tukura (born 1988), Nigerian footballer
