= Phyna =

Nigerian reality TV personality

- Born: Phyna Ijeoma Josephina Otabor; 2 June 1997 (age 29); Edo State, Nigeria
- Other name: Hype priestess of Nigeria
- Known for: Winner of Big Brother Naija season 7
- Television: Big Brother Naija
- Parents: Moses Otabor (father); Gladys Moses Otabor (mother)

Ijeoma Josephina Otabor (born 2 June 1997), known professionally as Phyna, is a Nigerian actress, model, and reality TV star. She was the winner of Big Brother Naija season 7.

== Early life ==
While on the Big Brother show, she mentioned that she is Igbo by tribe, even though her Ekpon community is in Edo State. She grew up in Auchi, Edo State, where she had her primary and secondary education. She completed her studies in the Engineering Department at Auchi Polytechnic.

== Career ==
Before entering the Big Brother Naija house, Phyna was a commercial model, who started her career from college and was signed by a modelling agency.

=== Big Brother Naija ===
Phyna entered the seventh season of Big Brother Naija (Level Up) as the tenth housemate on 23 July 2022.

During the season finale of the show on 2 October 2022, she was declared the winner scoring 40.74% of the final votes ahead of Bryann with 26.74% of the total votes cast and was entitled to the ₦100 000 000 (one hundred million naira) grand prize, making her the second female to win the show, three years after Mercy Eke won it.

== Endorsements ==
Phyna has endorsement deals with the following brands: Firegin, Spedy Herbals, Rixari Skin Secrets, BeUnique Wears, Spedy Weightloss

== Filmography ==
=== Television ===
| Year | Title | Role | Notes |
|---|---|---|---|
| 2022 | Big Brother Naija 7 | Contestant | Reality TV Show |
| 2023 | Leaving Beauty | Mabel | Produced by Mike Ezuruonye |
| 2023 | Shattered Innocence | Theresa | Produced by Abdulgafar Ahmad Oluwatoyin |
| 2023 | Osato | Osato | Produced by Charles Uwagbai and Etinosa Idemudia |
| 2023 | Ada Omo Daddy | | Produced by Mercy Aigbe |
| 2024 | House of trouble | | Produced by Mercy Johnson |

== Awards and nominations ==
| Year | Event | Prize | Result |
|---|---|---|---|
| 2022 | All Varieties Award | People's Choice of The Year | Won |
| 2022 | Africa Choice Awards | Honorary Award of Excellence | Won |
| 2023 | Trendupp Awards | Force of Online Sensation | Won |
| 2023 | La Mode Awards | Celebrity of The Year (Female) | Won |
| 2023 | Man on Cheq | Most Outspoken Female Celebrity | Won |
| 2023 | Edo State International Film Festival | Best Actress In a Movie "Osato" | Won |
