= Anita Natacha Akide =

Nigerian media personality, entrepreneur and actress

- Education: Ignatius Ajuru University of Education
- Occupations: Reality TV star, media personality, Entrepreneur and philanthropist

Anita Natacha Akide, professionally known as Symply Tacha, is a media personality, entrepreneur, and philanthropist. She has appeared on the show Big Brother Naija (season 4) as a housemate and also on MTV's The Challenge: Spies, Lies & Allies. She has won the awards like Net Honour's Most Popular Person, Female Personality of The Year, Celebrity Entrepreneur of the year and many more. She was the brand ambassador of GetFit, a Fitness brand

== Early life and education ==
In 2016, Akide received a Bachelor of Arts in English Language from the Ignatius Ajuru University of Education, Rumuolumeni in Rivers State, Nigeria.

=== Career ===
Akide joined the reality show Big Brother Naija (season 4) and also appeared in the reality show MTV's The Challenge: Spies, Lies & Allies. She acts as a brand ambassador for the eyewear company House of Lunettes, RealTech Company OxfordBuildBay, a representative for the fitness brand GetFit, and the global alcoholic beverage company Ciroc. She also debuted her Tacha Fierce brand of limited-edition Ciroc beverages.

== Television ==
Year	Title	Role	Notes	Ref.
2019	Big Brother Naija (season 4)	Contestant	(6th place)	
2021	The Challenge: Spies, Lies & Allies	Contestant	appeared in 3 episodes	

== Films ==
Year	Title	Role(s)	Notes	Ref.
2022	Tiger's Tail	TuTu	Nigerian film	

== Philanthropy ==
=== Natacha Akide Foundation (NAF) ===
Tacha founded Natacha Akide Foundation (NAF) in 2020 with the motive to serve the underprivileged. She started the initiative, Pad For Every Girl (PEG) to educate every girl of female hygiene.

=== Action Against Hunger ===
She started this initiative to fight the hunger problem amongst the families which suffered during the pandemic.

=== PVC Awareness Campaign ===
She went to River state in 2022 to encourage her people to get their Permanent Voter's Card (PVC) against 2023 election.

== Awards ==
Year	Event	Category	Result	Ref
2021	Net Honours	Most Popular Person	Won	
2021	TrendUpp Africa	Force of Twitter	Won	
2021	TrendUpp Africa	Force of Online Sensation	Nominated	
2020	SCREAM	Brand Influencer of the Year	Won	
2020	SCREAM	Fashion Brand of the Year	Won	
2020	SCREAM	Social Media Influencer of the year	Won	
2020	Africa Choice	Brand Influencer of the Year	Won	
2020	Africa Choice	Female Personality of The Year	Won	
2020	LaMode	Celebrity Entrepreneur of the year	Won	
2020	AV	Social Media Influencer of the Year	Won	
2020	AV	Brand of the year - Titans Collection	Won	
2020	Auracool	Most popular Female Naija Celeb	Won	
2020	Net Honours	Most Popular BB Naija Star	Won	
2019	STARZZ	Emerging Celebrity of the Year	Won	
