= Big Brother Naija season 4 =

Nigeria television show

Big Brother Naija
- Season 4
- Presented by: Ebuka Obi-Uchendu
- No. of days: 99
- No. of housemates: 26
- Winner: Mercy Eke
- Runner-up: Mike Edwards

Release
- Original network: Africa Magic
- Original release: 30 June – 6 October 2019

Season chronology
- ← Previous; Season 3 Next → Season 5

Big Brother Naija Season 4, also known as Big Brother Naija: Pepper Dem, is the fourth season of the Nigerian version of the reality show Big Brother. Produced by South Africa's award-winning production company, Red Pepper Pictures and it was launched on 30 June 2019 on the Africa Magic channels & DStv channel 198. Ex-housemate Ebuka Obi-Uchendu from season one continued as the host. The winner won ₦60 million worth of prizes.

== Housemates ==
Housemates	Age on Entry	Occupation	Residence/Birthplace	Day entered	Day exited	Status
Mercy Eke	26	Video vixen, ambassador and businesswoman	Lagos/Imo	0	98	Winner
Mike Edwards	28	CEO and athlete	Manchester	0	98	Runner-up
Chukwuemeka "Frodd" Okoye	28	Investment adviser and sales executive	Anambra	0	98	3rd place
"Omashola" Kola Oburoh	38	Model and club manager	Delta	0	98	4th place
Oluwaseyi "Seyi" Awolowo	30	Psychologist, actor and business man	Ogun	0	98	5th place
Diane Yashim	23	Model	Kaduna	0	92	Evicted
Steve "Ike" Ikechukwu Onyema	26	Model	Texas/Imo	0	91	Evicted
Elozonam Ogbolu	33	Musical artist	Lagos/Delta	30	91	Evicted
Cindy Okafor	23	Photographer and artist	—N/a	32	89	Evicted
Anita Natacha "Tacha" Akide	24	Entrepreneur and Instagram influencer	Rivers	0	89	Ejected
Khafi Kareem	29	Police officer	London/Ekiti	0	77	Evicted
Venita Akpofure	32	Actress	UK/Delta	30	70	Evicted
Atteh Daniel Tioluwa "Sir Dee"	27	Banker and graphics designer	Kogi	0	63	Evicted
Esther Olaoluwa Agunbiade	22	Lawyer	Lagos	0	63	Evicted
Ekpata Gedoni	31	Fashion entrepreneur	Cross River	0	56	Evicted
Jackye Madu	23	Software engineer	Anambra	0	56	Evicted
Joseph "Joe" AbDallah	26	Creative director		31	49	Evicted
Ede "Enkay" Nkechinyere	25	Fashion designer	Enugu	31	49	Evicted
Jeff Nweke	30	Banker	Jos/Anambra	0	35	Evicted
Nelson Allison	26	Mr Universe Nigeria	Rivers	0	28	Evicted
Thelma Ibemere	26	Hair business owner	Imo	0	28	Evicted
Tuoyo Ideh	23	Psychotherapist, Fitness coach and part-time stripper	Delta/Edo State	0	21	Evicted
Chinonso "KimOprah" Opara	23	Beauty Queen	Lagos	0	14	Evicted
Victoria "Ella" Nnabuchi	30	Television presenter, voice-over artist, actress and model	Anambra	0	14	Evicted
Saidat "Avala" Balogun	30	Singer and student	Ogun	0	7	Evicted
Isilomo Braimoh	27	HR Manager	Lagos	0	7	Evicted

The launch night is marked as Day 0. The day after is Day 1.

== Bet9ja Coins ==
For this season, Bet9ja Coins were introduced as a new house currency. Throughout the season which held in Lagos, Nigeria Bet9ja Coins were awarded during tasks, special challenges as the reward. Bet9ja Coins allowed housemates to buy any item of their choice throughout their stay in the House. Bet9ja Coins and BB Naira, the two currencies were different types of virtual currencies and could not be used interchangeably.

== Nominations table ==
Housemates of the team Cruisetopia. (Week 6 - 8)
Housemates of the team The Icons. (Week 6 - 8)
Housemates of the team Enigma. (Week 9)
Housemates of the team The Legends. (Week 9)

	Week 1	Week 2	Week 3	Week 4	Week 5	Week 6	Week 7	Week 8	Week 9	Week 10	Week 11	Week 12	Week 13		Week 14			Nominations received
	Week 1	Week 2	Week 3	Week 4	Week 5	Week 6	Week 7	Week 8	Week 9	Week 10	Week 11	Week 12	Week 13		Day 92	Final		Nominations received
Head of House	Jeff	Nelson	Esther	none	Frodd	Seyi	Seyi	Esther	Khafi	Ike; Mercy	Cindy	Elozonam	Seyi		none			Nominations received
Veto Power Holder	KimOprah	Frodd	Seyi	Khafi	none		Diane	Elozonam	Ike	Seyi	Omashola	Frodd				none		Nominations received
Mercy	No nominations	Ella; Frodd	Frodd; Mike	Jackye; Jeff	Mike; Omashola	No nominations	No nominations	No nominations	No nominations	Omashola; Venita	Omashola; Khafi	Frodd; Omashola	~~Tacha~~; ~~Omashola~~	Exempt	Exempt	Winner (Day 98)		12
Mike	No nominations	Ella; Tacha	Seyi; Tacha	Khafi; Frodd	Seyi; Tacha	No nominations	No nominations	No nominations	No nominations	Frodd; Seyi	Omashola; Tacha	Diane; Mercy	~~Frodd~~; ~~Tacha~~	Not; Eligible	Exempt	Runner-up (Day 98)		19
Frodd	No nominations	Tacha; Ella	Omashola; Tuoyo	Jeff; Nelson	Jeff; Sir Dee	No nominations	No nominations	No nominations	No nominations	Omashola; Elozonam	Mike; Ike	Cindy; Mercy	~~Mercy~~; ~~Mike~~	Cindy; Elozonam; Ike; Mike; Tacha	Exempt	Third place (Day 98)		25
Omashola	Nominated	Sir Dee; Tacha	Tacha; Frodd	Thelma; Frodd	Mike; Ike	No nominations	No nominations	No nominations	No nominations	Elozonam; Diane	Mercy; Tacha	Mercy; Diane	~~Mercy~~; ~~Elozonam~~	Not; Eligible	Nominated	Fourth place (Day 98)		17
Seyi	No nominations	Ella; Tuoyo	Frodd; Tuoyo	Secret; Room	Jeff; Tacha	Head of House	Head of House	No nominations	No nominations	Mercy; Frodd	Khafi; Tacha	Ike; Mercy	~~Ike~~; ~~Mercy~~	Head of House	Exempt	Fifth place (Day 98)		14
Diane	No nominations	KimOprah; Tacha	Seyi; Mike	Mike; Jackye	Jeff; Seyi	No nominations	Veto Power; Holder	No nominations	No nominations	Omashola; Venita	Omashola; Mike	Mike; Omashola	~~Mike~~; ~~Tacha~~	Not; Eligible	Nominated	Evicted (Day 92)		9
Ike	Nominated	Jeff; Diane	Seyi; Frodd	Jeff; Nelson	Jeff; Jackye	No nominations	No nominations	No nominations	Veto Power; Holder	Venita; Khafi	Diane; Khafi	Cindy; Frodd	~~Cindy~~; ~~Elozonam~~	Not; Eligible	Evicted (Day 91)			12
Elozonam	Not in House					No nominations	No nominations	Veto Power; Holder	No nominations	Seyi; Mike	Frodd; Tacha	Frodd; Tacha	~~Tacha~~; ~~Frodd~~	Not; Eligible	Evicted (Day 91)			7
Cindy	Not in House					No nominations	No nominations	No nominations	No nominations	Diane; Seyi	Diane; Mike	Diane; Ike	~~Diane~~; ~~Ike~~	Not; Eligible	Evicted (Day 89)			6
Tacha	No nominations	Frodd; Sir Dee	Frodd; Gedoni	Secret; Room	Jeff; Gedoni	No nominations	No nominations	No nominations	No nominations	Mercy; Frodd	Seyi; Mike	Cindy; Mike	~~Cindy~~; ~~Elozonam~~	Not; Eligible	Ejected (Day 89)			25
Khafi	No nominations	KimOprah; Frodd	Seyi; Thelma	Jeff; Thelma	Jackye; Esther	No nominations	No nominations	No nominations	Head of House	Elozonam; Venita	Seyi; Mercy	Evicted (Day 77)						8
Venita	Not in House					No nominations	No nominations	No nominations	No nominations	Frodd; Khafi	Evicted (Day 70)							4
Sir Dee	No nominations	Ella; Ike	Jackye; Frodd	Omashola; Thelma	Ike; Omashola	No nominations	No nominations	No nominations	No nominations	Evicted (Day 63)								6
Esther	No nominations	Ike; Tacha	Mike; Jeff	Jeff; Omashola	Jeff; Omashola	No nominations	No nominations	Head of House	No nominations	Evicted (Day 63)								3
Gedoni	No nominations	Tuoyo; Mercy	Mike; Tuoyo	Thelma; Omashola	Mike; Jeff	No nominations	No nominations	No nominations	Evicted (Day 56)									4
Jackye	No nominations	Jeff; Sir Dee	Tacha; Tuoyo	Frodd; Thelma	Jeff; Omashola	No nominations	No nominations	No nominations	Evicted (Day 56)									6
Joe	Not in House					No nominations	No nominations	Evicted (Day 49)										0
Enkay	Not in House					No nominations	No nominations	Evicted (Day 49)										0
Jeff	Head of House	Frodd; Esther	Seyi; Tuoyo	Khafi; Ike	Tacha; Sir Dee	Evicted (Day 35)												18
Thelma	No nominations	Frodd; Tacha	Frodd; Tacha	Esther; Sir Dee	Evicted (Day 28)													6
Nelson	No nominations	Ella; Gedoni	Gedoni; Seyi	Jeff; Khafi	Evicted (Day 28)													2
Tuoyo	No nominations	Ella; Seyi	Jeff; Mike	Evicted (Day 21)														7
KimOprah	Veto Power; Holder	Tacha; Jackye	Evicted (Day 14)															3
Ella	No nominations	KimOprah; Tacha	Evicted (Day 14)															7
Avala	No nominations	Evicted (Day 7)																N/A
Isilomo	No nominations	Evicted (Day 7)																N/A
Note	1, 2, 3, 4, 5, 6	none	7	8	9,10,11,12	13, 14	13, 14	13, 14	15	none		16, 17	17, 18		19	20		
Nominated (pre-save and replace)	Avala; Gedoni; Ike; Isilomo; Khafi; Omashola	Ella; Frodd; KimOprah; Sir Dee; Tacha	Frodd; Mike; Seyi; Tacha; Tuoyo	none		none	Cindy; Elozonam; Enkay; Frodd; Ike; Khafi; Omashola; Sir Dee; Tacha	Diane; Esther; Gedoni; Jackye; Mercy; Mike; Seyi; Venita	Esther; Frodd; Khafi; Omashola; Sir Dee; Tacha; Venita	Elozonam; Frodd; Omashola; Seyi; Venita	Khafi; Mike; Omashola; Tacha	~~Cindy~~; ~~Diane~~; ~~Frodd~~; ~~Mercy~~	Nominations; Void	none	Diane; Omashola	none		
Saved	none	Frodd	none	none		none	Sir Dee	Venita	Omashola	Seyi	Omashola	none	Nominations; Void	none	none	none		
Against public vote	none	Ella; KimOprah; Mercy; Sir Dee; Tacha	Frodd; Mike; Seyi; Tacha; Tuoyo	All; Housemates	Jeff; Mike; Omashola; Tacha	none	Cindy; Elozonam; Enkay; Frodd; Ike; Joe; Khafi; Omashola; Tacha	Diane; Frodd; Gedoni; Jackye; Mercy; Mike; Seyi	Cindy; Esther; Frodd; Sir Dee; Tacha; Venita	Elozonam; Frodd; Khafi; Omashola; Venita	Khafi; Mike; Seyi; Tacha	none	Nominations; Void	Cindy; Elozonam; Ike; Mike; ~~Tacha~~	none	All; Housemates		
Ejected	none													Tacha	none			
Evicted	Avala; Evicted by challenge	KimOprah; 14.82% to save	Seyi; Fake evicted (out of 2)	Thelma; 0.83% to save	Jeff; 5.80% to save	No; Eviction	Joe; 6.67% to save	Gedoni; 3.98% to save	Sir Dee; 7.74% to save	Venita; 7.06% to save	Khafi; 19.23% to save	No; Eviction	None	Ike; 18.90% to save	Diane; Evicted by random draw by Frodd	Seyi; 10.25% to win	Omashola; 11.58% to win	
Evicted	Avala; Evicted by challenge	KimOprah; 14.82% to save	Tacha; Fake evicted (out of 3)	Thelma; 0.83% to save	Jeff; 5.80% to save	No; Eviction	Joe; 6.67% to save	Gedoni; 3.98% to save	Sir Dee; 7.74% to save	Venita; 7.06% to save	Khafi; 19.23% to save	No; Eviction	None	Elozonam; 7.15% to save	Diane; Evicted by random draw by Frodd	Seyi; 10.25% to win	Omashola; 11.58% to win	
Evicted	Isilomo; Evicted by challenge	Ella; 5.38% to save	Tacha; Fake evicted (out of 3)	Nelson; 0.70% to save	Jeff; 5.80% to save	No; Eviction	Enkay; 0.88% to save	Jackye; 3.38% to save	Esther; 6.31% to save	Venita; 7.06% to save	Khafi; 19.23% to save	No; Eviction	None	Elozonam; 7.15% to save	Diane; Evicted by random draw by Frodd	Frodd; 16.46% to win	Mike; 19.94% to win	
Evicted	Isilomo; Evicted by challenge	Ella; 5.38% to save	Tuoyo; 6.66% to save	Nelson; 0.70% to save	Jeff; 5.80% to save	No; Eviction	Enkay; 0.88% to save	Jackye; 3.38% to save	Esther; 6.31% to save	Venita; 7.06% to save	Khafi; 19.23% to save	No; Eviction	None	Cindy; 5.65% to save	Diane; Evicted by random draw by Frodd	Frodd; 16.46% to win	Mike; 19.94% to win	
Survived	Gedoni; Khafi	Mercy; 29.26% Tacha; 28.77% Sir Dee; 21.77%	Tacha; 27.25% Seyi; 26.72% Mike; 26.39% Frodd; 13.07%	Others; 92.80% Gedoni; 1.66% Jackye; 1.53% Esther; 1.46% Jeff; 1.02%	Mike; 33.63% Tacha; 32.73% Omashola; 27.84%	No; Eviction	Tacha; 26.90% Omashola; 16.80% Ike; 15.26% Cindy; 10.56% Khafi; 7.97% Elozonam; 7.64% Frodd; 7.32%	Mercy; 25.55% Mike; 20.60% Frodd; 19.20% Seyi; 15.69% Diane; 11.60%	Tacha; 31.22% Cindy; 22.03% Frodd; 20.17% Venita; 12.53%	Khafi; 28.21% Frodd; 24.46% Omashola; 20.61% Elozonam; 19.66%	Tacha; 28.51% Mike; 26.44% Seyi; 25.82%	No; Eviction	None	~~Tacha~~; ~~41.66%~~; Mike; 26.64%	Omashola	Mercy; 41.77% to win		

=== Note ===
- ^Note 1: Big Brother instructed the housemates to pick a key each, from the 21 keys placed on the table from where they moved outside to several boxes. KimOprah was the only housemate to open a locker and retrieve an item inside, making her the first winner of the Veto Power Game of Chance.
- ^Note 2: On Day 1, the housemates have chosen Jeff as the first Head of House. As the Head of House, Jeff has won himself 500 "Bet9ja Coins" and a badge.
- ^Note 3: In the first week, there were no nominations. Instead, the housemate/housemates with the lowest total amount of "Bet9ja Coins" were to be evicted.
- ^Note 4: On Day 7, Omashola and Ike were put up for eviction by Big Brother, they both received a stern warning and a strike each for breaking the house rules.
- ^Note 5: During the eviction show on Day 7, the host Ebuka announced that two housemates will be leaving the house. Avala, Gedoni, Khafi and Isilomo are the housemates with the lowest total amount of "Bet9ja Coins" are up for eviction, with Omashola and Ike.
- ^Note 6: Avala, Khafi, Isilomo and Gedoni were gathered to the arena area by Biggie for an eviction challenge. In the end, Avala and Isilomo failed in the challenge, they were therefore evicted from the Big Brother house.
- ^Note 7: Seyi refused to use his Veto Power thus no Save and Replace took place. The nominations remained the same for the week.
- ^ Note 8: No Head of House was appointed this week.
- ^ Note 9: On Day 30, two new housemates (Elozonam and Venita) entered the house.
- ^ Note 10: On week 5, all housemates missed out on the opportunity of the veto power thus there was no save and replace.
- ^ Note 11: On Day 31, two new housemates (Enkay and Joe) entered the house.
- ^ Note 12: On Day 32, one new housemate (Cindy) entered the house.
- ^ Note 13: Housemates were split into two team: The Icons and Cruisetopia .
- ^ Note 14: Housemates will no longer have the usual nomination process, instead they will be having nomination challenges. Housemates are henceforth playing all the Big Brother Naija Games or Nomination Tasks in their selected Teams. The winning team will have weekly supplies. The losing team will automatically be up for eviction.
- ^ Note 15: Housemates were regrouped into two new team: The Legends and Enigma while the former team 'The Icons' and 'Cruisetopia' were dissolved.
- ^ Note 16: Week 12's nominations are fake. On Day 78, Mercy bought immunity, securing her a place in the finale.
- ^ Note 17: During the live show on Day 84, Frodd won the Ultimate Veto Power, he has the power to nominate five housemates for eviction in Week 13.
- ^ Note 18: On Day 89, Tacha was ejected from the Big Brother house due to physical assault to Mercy.
- ^ Note 19: As the final part of the privilege of Frodd's Ultimate Veto Power, he had to do a random eviction draw between Diane and Omashola. He picked Diane. So Diane was evicted from the house.
- ^ Note 20: For the final week, the public were voting for who they wanted to win, rather than save. Mercy became the first female winner of Big Brother Naija on Day 98.

== Controversy ==
=== Promiscuity ===
In July 2019, the advocate group MURIC (Muslim Rights Concern), wrote a petition to the Nigerian government about the effects the series could be having on the population. In a statement to President Muhammadu Buhari, director of the activist group Professor Ishaq Akintola stated, "We are being forcibly dragged to a world of nudity, shamelessness and open promiscuity. Inmates of BBNaija kiss, romance and engage in sex openly. BBNaija is bohemian, anti-social, crude and immoral. It constitutes a potent danger to every home. BBNaija is satanic. It is unacceptable. Where are our norms and values? Is it part of African culture to engage in sex in the open?" The organisation then called for all of Nigeria to unite on this topic, despite their religious differences.

This season of the show sparked a lot of controversy for its openness of sexuality and promiscuity, receiving backlash from a lot of religious figures online including Pastor Felix Ajide of King Jesus Praiseland Assembly. Other religious people in the country had opposing opinions and one anonymous Muslim woman expressed, "It has also created opportunities to showcase our culture as well as give room for people to sell their products and give added value to their products," while a civil servant, Chinonye Anokam, said the show is an avenue where Nigerian youth discover their hidden talents and realise their dreams.

=== British police investigation ===
Housemate Khafi Kareem was put under investigation by the Metropolitan Police in London, which she worked for, for going on the programme despite being told she was not allowed. An unnamed colleague of hers stated she was "tarnishing the reputation of the force". Kareem started a romance with fellow housemate Gedoni Ekpata and was reported by many online blogs and netizens to have had sex with him under the covers multiple times on camera. Kareem later denied this. The Met Police confirmed that she was granted unpaid leave for an unrelated reason and her request to join the show was denied. She was given a final written warning in 2022.
