= Efe Money =

Nigerian musician and media personality (born 1993)

- Born: 25 February 1993 (age 33); Jos, Nigeria
- Occupations: Rapper; singer; songwriter; reality TV star
- Years active: 2017–present
- Known for: Winner of the Big Brother Naija season 2 premier edition
- Television: Big Brother Naija

Michael Efe Ejeba (born 25 February 1993), popularly known as Efe or Efe Money, is a Nigerian rapper, singer, songwriter, and record producer. He won Big Brother Naija season 2, receiving a cash prize of ₦25 million and a brand-new SUV after spending 78 days in the house competing with other housemates.

== Early life and education ==
Michael Efe Ejeba, a native of Delta State, was born on 25 February 1993 in Jos, Plateau State. He attended Dafwaho Private School for his primary education and Federal Government College, Jos, for his secondary education. He is a graduate of the University of Jos.

== Career ==
His first official single "Based on Logistics" was released in 2017 to positive reviews. He later released a single featuring Olamide, titled "Warri".

Efe Money blends rap with pidgin to connect with the music taste of audiences across Nigeria. His musical influences are Eminem, Dr. Dre, Bone Thugs-n-Harmony, 50 Cent, M.I Abaga, and Naeto C.

On 4 November 2023, Efe Money was a headline act in the United States at a boxing match between Efe Ajagba and Joseph Goodall, where he performed his single, "Money Talk".

He has collaborated with Nigerian artistes such as Ice Prince, Illbliss, Vector, Oritse Femi, Jaywon, and Victor Thompson.

== Awards ==
In 2017, he was appointed entertainment, creative industry, and youth ambassador by the Nigerian Ministry of Youth and Sports. In 2018, he became the African ambassador for Kalinga University, India.

== Discography ==
=== Mixtapes ===
- Best Of Efe (The Playlist) (2020)

=== EPs ===
- Am Sorry Am Winning (2018)
- Nonstop (2020)
- No Boundaries (2020)
- Against All Odds (2021)
- Stubborn Boy (2022)
- Une Bounce (2024)

=== Singles ===
- "Based On Logistics" (2017)
- "Somebody" (2017)
- "I Love You" (2017)
- "6 Pack" (2017)
- "Far Away" (2019)
- "Scammer" (2019)
- "Before Campaign Drops" (2019)
- "Campaign" (2019)
- "Your Body" (2020)
- "Belinda (remix)" (2021)
- "No Go Do Again" (2022)
- "Rap List" (2025)
- "My Bestie" (2025)

== Filmography ==
=== Television ===
Year	Title	Role	Notes
2017	Big Brother season 2	Himself	Reality show
