= Big Brother Naija season 2 =

Season of television series

Big Brother Naija
- Season 2
- Presented by: Ebuka Obi-Uchendu
- No. of days: 77
- No. of housemates: 14
- Winner: Michael Ejeba
- Runner-up: Bisola Aiyeola

Release
- Original network: Africa Magic
- Original release: 22 January – 9 April 2017

Series chronology
- ← Previous; Season 1 Next → Season 3

Big Brother Naija 2017, also known as Big Brother Naija: See Gobbe, is the second season of the Nigerian reality show Big Brother Naija. It was launched on 22 January 2017. Housemate Ebuka Obi-Uchendu from season one was the host. Two fake housemates, Jon Ogah and Ese Eriata, were introduced halfway into the show.

The winner was Michael Ejeba.

== Housemates ==
Twelve contestants entered the Big Brother Naija house to compete for a ₦25 million prize.

Housemates	Age On Entry	Residence	Day Entered	Day Exited	Status
Michael "Efe" Ejeba	23	Jos	0	77	Winner
Bisola Aiyeola	32	Lagos	0	77	Runner Up
Takunbo "TBoss" Idowu	33	Edo State	0	77	3rd Place
Olurishe Deborah "Debbie-Rise" Ebun	28	Kogi	7	77	4th Place
Marvis Nkpornwi	26	Port Harcourt	0	77	5th Place
Bally Balat	29	Abuja	0	70	Evicted
Bassey Ekpenyong	27	Cross River	7	63	Evicted
Anthony "ThinTallTony" Edet	36	Cross River	0	56	Evicted
Anita "Uriel" Oputa	30	Lagos/UK	0	42	Evicted
Ekemini "Kemen" Ekerette	27	Port Harcourt	0	42	Ejected
Gifty Powers	23	Lagos	0	28	Evicted
Mojisola "CoColce" Sowode	29	Lagos	0	21	Evicted
Miyonse Oluwaseyi Amosu	25	Abuja	0	14	Evicted
Somadina "Soma" Anyama	24	Lagos	0	14	Evicted

== Nominations table ==
Although Michael "Efe" Ejemba eventually became the winner of Big Brother Naija: See Gobbe, he was among the first three housemates to be nominated for eviction. He was nominated alongside Somadina "Soma" Anyama and Miyonse Oluwaseyi Amosu, who became the first evictees for that season.

	Week 1		Week 2		Week 3	Week 4	Week 5	Week 6	Week 7	Week 8	Week 9	Week 10	Week 11 Final		Nominations Received
	Day 0	Day 2	Week 2		Week 3	Week 4	Week 5	Week 6	Week 7	Week 8	Week 9	Week 10	Week 11 Final		Nominations Received
Efe	Head of House	~~Marvis~~; ~~ThinTallTony~~	Miyonse; TBoss		TBoss; CoCoIce	TBoss; Gifty	~~TBoss~~; ~~Ese~~	No; Nominations	No; Nominations	TBoss; ThinTallTony	TBoss; Debie-Rise; Bassey; Bally	TBoss; Debie-Rise	Winner (Day 77)		12
Bisola	No; Nominations	~~Efe~~; ~~ThinTallTony~~	Miyonse; Gifty		Debie-Rise; CoCoIce	Gifty; TBoss	~~TBoss~~; ~~Uriel~~	No; Nominations	No; Nominations	Bassey; Debie-Rise	Not eligible	TBoss; Debie-Rise	Runner-up (Day 77)		8
TBoss	No; Nominations	~~Miyonse~~; ~~Bisola~~	Miyonse; Gifty		Marvis; Bassey	Uriel; Marvis	~~Bally~~; ~~Uriel~~	No; Nominations	No; Nominations	Efe; Marvis	Not eligible	Marvis; Efe	Third place (Day 77)		18
Debie-Rise	Not in House		Exempt		Marvis; Bisola	Marvis; ThinTallTony	~~Ese~~; ~~Jon~~	No; Nominations	No; Nominations	Bally; ThinTallTony	Not eligible	Marvis; Efe	Fourth place (Day 77)		12
Marvis	No; Nominations	~~Kemen~~; ~~Efe~~	Miyonse; Gifty		CoCoIce; Debie-Rise	Bally; Uriel	~~Ese~~; ~~Debby-Rise~~	No; Nominations	No; Nominations	Bassey; ThinTallTony	Not eligible	TBoss; Debie-Rise	Fifth place (Day 77)		11
Marvis	No; Nominations	~~Kemen~~; ~~Efe~~	Miyonse; Gifty		CoCoIce; Debie-Rise	Bally; Uriel	~~Ese~~; ~~Debby-Rise~~	No; Nominations	No; Nominations	Debie-Rise	Not eligible	TBoss; Debie-Rise	Fifth place (Day 77)		11
Bally	No; Nominations	~~Uriel~~; ~~Efe~~	Miyonse; Soma		CoCoIce; Kemen	Efe; ThinTallTony	~~Efe~~; ~~Ese~~	No; Nominations	No; Nominations	TBoss; Bassey	Not eligible	TBoss; Debie-Rise	Evicted (Day 70)		8
Bassey	Not in House		Exempt		Bisola; ThinTallTony	ThinTallTony; Bisola	~~Jon~~; ~~Bassey~~	No; Nominations	No; Nominations	ThinTallTony; TBoss	Not eligible	Evicted (Day 63)			6
ThinTallTony	No; Nominations	~~Efe~~; ~~Marvis~~	Gifty; Miyonse		Debie-Rise; Gifty	TBoss; Gifty	~~Uriel~~; ~~Efe~~	Head of House	Head of House	Bally; Efe	Evicted (Day 56)				17
Uriel	No; Nominations	~~Soma~~; ~~Bali~~	Bisola; TBoss		CoCoIce; ThinTallTony	Debie-Rise; TBoss	~~Ese~~; ~~Jon~~	No; Nominations	Evicted (Day 42)						8
Kemen	No; Nominations	~~Marvis~~; ~~ThinTallTony~~	Miyonse; Soma		Bisola; ThinTallTony	Gifty; Debie-Rise	~~Ese~~; ~~Jon~~	No; Nominations	Ejected (Day 42)						4
Gifty	No; Nominations	~~Uriel~~; ~~ThinTallTony~~	CoColce; Bisola		CocoIce; Bassey	Bassey; Kemen	Evicted (Day 28)								5
CoColce	No; Nominations	~~Uriel~~; ~~Bisola~~	Miyonse; Soma		ThinTallTony; Bassey	Evicted (Day 21)									7
Miyonse	No; Nominations	~~Soma~~; ~~TBoss~~	Kemen; Marvis		Evicted (Day 14)										9
Soma	No; Nominations	~~ThinTallTony~~; ~~Efe~~	Kemen; ThinTallTony		Evicted (Day 14)										5
Fake Housemates
Ese	Not in House					Head of House	~~Uriel~~; ~~Bassey~~	Left (Day 35)							5
Jon	Not in House					Exempt	~~Bally~~; ~~Marvis~~	Left (Day 35)							4
Notes	1	1, 2	3, 4		none	5	6	7	none	8	9	none	10		
Head of House	Efe	Uriel	CoColce	Efe	Efe	Ese	Kemen	ThinTallTony	ThinTallTony	Bassey	Efe	Bisola	none		
Nominated (pre-save and replace)	none	Bally; CoCoIce; Kemen; Miyonse; Tboss	Gifty; Miyonse; Soma		Bassey; Bisola; CoCoIce; Debie-Rise; ThinTallTony	Gifty; TBoss; ThinTallTony	none	Bassey; Debie-Rise; Efe; Kemen; Marvis; TBoss; ThinTallTony; Uriel	none	Bally; TBoss; ThinTallTony	none	Efe; Debie-Rise; Marvis; TBoss	none		
Saved	none	Miyonse	Gifty		ThinTallTony	TBoss	none	ThinTallTony	none	Bally	none	Efe	none		
Against public vote	none	Bally; CoCoIce; Kemen; Marvis; Tboss	Efe; Miyonse; Soma		Bassey; Bisola; CoCoIce; Debie-Rise; Gifty	Gifty; Marvis; ThinTallTony	none	Bassey; Debie-Rise; Efe; Kemen; Marvis; TBoss; Uriel	none	Debie-Rise; Efe; TBoss; ThinTallTony	Bally; Bassey; Debie-Rise; TBoss	Bally; Debie-Rise; Marvis; TBoss	Bisola; Debie-Rise; Efe; Marvis; TBoss		
Ejected	None							Kemen	None						
Evicted	No; Eviction		Soma; Fewest votes to save		CoColce; 11.5% to save	Gifty; 25.6% to save	Ese; Biggie's choice to evict	Uriel; 7.9% to save	No; Eviction	ThinTallTony; 11.68% to save	Bassey; 19.8% to save	Bally; 23.76% to save	Marvis; 1.47% to win	Debie-Rise; 8.78% to win	
Evicted	No; Eviction		Miyonse; Fewest votes to save		CoColce; 11.5% to save	Gifty; 25.6% to save	Jon; Biggie's choice to evict	Uriel; 7.9% to save	No; Eviction	ThinTallTony; 11.68% to save	Bassey; 19.8% to save	Bally; 23.76% to save	TBoss; 13.6% to win	Bisola; 18.54% to win	
Saved	No; Eviction		Efe; Most votes		Bisola; 40.2% Bassey; 22.2% Debie-Rise; 13.6% Gifty; 12.4%	Marvis; 42.3% ThinTallTony; 32.1%	none	Efe; 39.9% TBoss; 14.4% Marvis; 12.9% Bassey; 11.8% Debie-Rise; 8.3% ~~Kemen~~; ~~4.8%~~	No; Eviction	Efe; 51.97% Debie-Rise; 21.78% TBoss; 14.57%	Bally; 30.2% Debie-Rise; 26.3% TBoss; 23.7%	TBoss; 26.49% Debie-Rise; 25.36% Marvis; 24.40%	Efe; 57.61% to win		

=== Notes ===
Jon and Ese were Fake Housemates, they can nominate but cannot be nominated.

- ^Note 1: Housemates were announced that they would be competing for "likes" and the two housemates with the least amount of them would be evicted. However, this task only existed for housemates to know each other and no one will be evicted but instead, two more housemates will be joining later.
- ^Note 2: Fake nominations with housemates nominating to save. If the eviction went ahead, TBoss, CoColce, Kemen, Bally and Marvis would have faced the public vote.
- ^Note 3: Bassey and Debie-Rise were exempt, as they were new housemates.
- ^Note 4: The Head of House title was given to Efe on Day 9, but he still facing eviction.
- ^Note 5: This week, two fake housemates entered the house. They are Jon and Ese. Ese won the Head of House title. Later, she saved TBoss and nominate Marvis for eviction.
- ^Note 6: This week, all housemates' nominations were cancelled by Big Brother. He would decide who would be evicted on Sunday night.
- ^Note 7: Kemen was ejected from the house after inappropriately touching TBoss. His votes were voided, so Uriel was evicted.
- ^Note 8: Marvis was able to directly nominate one housemate with her Power Card. She Nominated Debie-Rise.
- ^Note 9: As Head of House this week, Efe would be the only housemate to nominate.
- ^Note 10: For the final week the public were voting for who they wanted to win, rather than to save.
