= Big Brother Naija season 7 =

Nigerian television show

Big Brother Naija
- Season 7
- Presented by: Ebuka Obi-Uchendu
- No. of days: 71
- No. of housemates: 28
- Winner: Ijeoma Josephina "Phyna" Otabor
- Runner-up: Brian Chukwuebuka "Bryann" Chiji

Release
- Original network: Africa Magic
- Original release: 23 July – 2 October 2022

Season chronology
- ← Previous; Season 6 Next → Season 8

Big Brother Naija Season 7 also known as Big Brother Naija: Level Up is the seventh season of the Nigerian version of the reality show Big Brother. It premiered on 23 and 24 July 2022 on DStv channel 198/199 and GOtv channel 8/29. Ebuka Obi-Uchendu returned as the host for the 6th consecutive time.

The headline sponsor of the show was Pocket by Piggyvest and the associate sponsor was Flutterwave.

According to the organizers of the show MultiChoice, the winner of the season is expected to win a total of ₦100 million grand prize which includes a N50m cash prize and ₦50m worth of prizes from sponsors.

== Auditions ==
A virtual audition was held to select contestants for the show on 15 May 2022 to 30 May 2022. Interested contestants were told to record and submit a three-minute video stating why they should appear on the show.

== Housemates ==
Housemates	Age on Entry	Occupation	Residence/Birthplace	Day entered	Day exited	Status
Ijeoma Josephina "Phyna" Otabor	25	Actress	Edo State	0A	72	Winner
Brian Chukwuebuka "Bryann" Chiji	24	Singer, songwriter	Imo State	0A	72	Runner-up
Chidimma Esther "Bella" Okagbue	25	Graduate, content creator	Anambra State	0B	72	3thplace
Adekunle Tobilola Olopade	27	Digital marking consultant	Lagos State	0B	72	4th Place
Chinenyenwa Desire "Chichi" Okoebor	22	Exotic dancer, chef	Edo State/Anambra State	0B	72	5th Place
Daniella Utangbe Peters	22	Poet	Lagos State	0A	72	6th place
Aniekwe Francis "Chizzy" Chidi	28	Student, entrepreneur, farmer	Anambra State	14	68	Left
Rachel Eghonghon Akowe	27	Makeup artist	Ekpoma, Edo State	14	68	Left
Hermes Chibueze Iyele	25	Performance artist, Basketballer	Lagos State	0B	65	Evicted
Segun Daniel "Sheggz" Olusemo	26	Footballer, actor	England/Lagos State	0B	65	Evicted
Henry Olisaemeka "Groovy" Oche	21	Artist, fashion entrepreneur, model	Anambra State	0A	65	Evicted
Oladotun Mofiyinfoluwa Oloniyo	26	Physiologist	Lagos State/Ekiti State	0B	58	Evicted
Osy Allysyn Audu	25	Model	Benin City, Edo State	0B	58	Evicted
Esther Chioma "Chomzy" Ndubueze	22	Entrepreneur	Imo State	0B	51	Evicted
Eloka Paul "Eloswag" Nwamu	27	Digital marketer, content creator	Delta State	0B	51	Evicted
Doyinsola Anuoluwapo David	26	Radiographer	Ondo State	0B	51	Evicted
Gideon Anieti "Giddyfia" Nwawo	24	Engineer, model, fitness trainer	Lagos State/Akwa Ibom State	0B	44	Evicted
Diana Isoken Edobor	33	Project manager	Edo State	0B	44	Evicted
Ayodeji Morafa	31	Pharmacist, digital artist	Lagos State	7	44	Left
Chiamaka Crystal "Amaka" Mbah	23	Healthcare worker	Anambra State	0A	37	Evicted
Modella Gabriella	24	YouTuber, actress, makeup artist	Osun State	7	37	Left
Saviour Ikin "Pharmsavi" Akpan	26	Pharmacist	Akwa Ibom State	0A	30	Evicted
Kesiena Tony "Kess" Adjekpovu	28	Businessman	Delta State	0A	30	Evicted
Ismail Rukuba "Khalid" Ahulu	22	Artist, basketballer, skateboarder	Plateau State	0A	23	Evicted
Ilebaye Odiniya	21	Graduate, entrepreneur	Kogi State	0A	23	Evicted
Bright Chidi "Cyph" Nwekete	27	Tech Designer, Entrepreneur	Imo State	0A	16	Evicted
Christiana Oluwafunke "Christy O" Ojumu	24	Entrepreneur	Ondo State	0A	16	Evicted
Beauty Etsanyi Tukura	24	Lawyer	Taraba State	0A	14	Ejected

The 1st launch night (23 July) is marked as Day 0A. The 2nd launch night (24 July) is marked as Day 0B. The day after is Day 1.

== Voting history and nominations table ==
Housemates in Level 1 of the Big Brother House (Weeks 1-4)
Housemates in Level 2 of the Big Brother House (Weeks 1-4)

	Week 1	Week 2	Week 3	Week 4	Week 5	Week 6		Week 7	Week 8	Week 9	Week 10			Nominations & votes received
	Week 1	Week 2	Week 3	Week 4	Week 5	Day 36	Day 42	Week 7	Week 8	Week 9	Days 64-67	Final		Nominations & votes received
Head of House	Eloswag	Hermes	Adekunle	Eloswag	Chomzy	Dotun		Hermes	Phyna	Chichi	Chizzy	none		Nominations & votes received
Phyna	No; Voting	Did Not; Vote	Did Not; Vote	Did Not; Vote	~~Adekunle~~; ~~Hermes~~	Adekunle; Hermes	No; Voting	Adekunle; Allysyn; Chomzy	Sheggz; Hermes; Bella	No; Voting	No; Voting	Winner (Day 70)		5
Bryann	No; Voting	Did Not; Vote	Did Not; Vote	Did Not; Vote	~~Chichi~~; ~~Adekunle~~	Amaka; Eloswag	No; Voting	Chomzy; Doyin; Eloswag	Hermes; Adekunle; Bella	No; Voting	No; Voting	Runner-up (Day 70)		3
Bella	No; Voting	Did Not; Vote	Did Not; Vote	Did Not; Vote	~~Hermes~~; ~~Amaka~~	Adekunle; Chizzy	No; Voting	Eloswag; Daniella; Phyna	Daniella; Rachel; Hermes	No; Voting	No; Voting	3rd place (Day 70)		13
Adekunle	No; Voting	Did Not; Vote	Khalid; Ilebaye; Phyna; Bryann; Groovy	Did Not; Vote	~~Sheggz~~; ~~Bella~~	Doyin; Amaka	No; Voting	Bella; Doyin; Sheggz	Dotun; Bella; Sheggz	No; Voting	No; Voting	4th place (Day 70)		21
Chichi	No; Voting	Did Not; Vote	Did Not; Vote	Did Not; Vote	~~Allysyn~~; ~~Adekunle~~	Adekunle; Allysyn	No; Voting	Bella; Chizzy; Rachel	Sheggz; Hermes; Bryann	Head of House	No; Voting	5th place (Day 70)		14
Daniella	No; Voting	Did Not; Vote	Did Not; Vote	Did Not; Vote	~~Hermes~~; ~~Chichi~~	Hermes; Chichi	No; Voting	Chomzy; Eloswag; Rachel	Hermes; Rachel; Bella	No; Voting	No; Voting	6th place (Day 70)		4
Hermes	No; Voting	Cyph; Christy O Amaka; Khalid; Phyna	Did Not; Vote	Did Not; Vote	~~Chichi~~; ~~Doyin~~	Doyin; Chichi	No; Voting	Bella; Bryann; Rachel	Sheggz; Bella; Rachel	No; Voting	Evicted (Day 63)			17
Sheggz	No; Voting	Did Not; Vote	Did Not; Vote	Did Not; Vote	~~Adekunle~~; ~~Rachel~~	Chizzy; Diana	No; Voting	Adekunle; Chizzy; Rachel	Rachel; Chichi; Adekunle	No; Voting	Evicted (Day 63)			11
Groovy	No; Voting	Did Not; Vote	Did Not; Vote	Did Not; Vote	~~Adekunle~~; ~~Doyin~~	Adekunle; Doyin	No; Voting	Adekunle; Eloswag; Rachel	Allysyn; Chichi; Dotun	No; Voting	Evicted (Day 63)			2
Dotun	No; Voting	Did Not; Vote	Did Not; Vote	Did Not; Vote	~~Adekunle~~; ~~Rachel~~	Rachel; Amaka	No; Voting	Chizzy; Phyna; Rachel	Hermes; Adekunle; Rachel	Evicted (Day 56)				3
Allysyn	No; Voting	Did Not; Vote	Did Not; Vote	Did Not; Vote	~~Chichi~~; ~~Rachel~~	Rachel; Chizzy	No; Voting	Chizzy; Chichi; Rachel	Bella; Sheggz; Adekunle	Evicted (Day 56)				5
Doyin	No; Voting	Did Not; Vote	Did Not; Vote	Did Not; Vote	~~Hermes~~; ~~Rachel~~	Rachel; Adekunle	No; Voting	Adekunle; Chichi; Eloswag	Evicted (Day 49)					15
Chomzy	No; Voting	Did Not; Vote	Did Not; Vote	Did Not; Vote	~~Giddyfia~~; ~~Amaka~~	Amaka; Doyin	No; Voting	Daniella; Doyin; Phyna	Evicted (Day 49)					4
Eloswag	Head of House	Did Not; Vote	Did Not; Vote	Chizzy; Daniella; Kess; Modella; Pharmsavi; Amaka; Groovy	~~Doyin~~; ~~Amaka~~	Doyin; Amaka	No; Voting	Bella; Chizzy; Doyin	Evicted (Day 49)					7
Giddyfia	No; Voting	Did Not; Vote	Did Not; Vote	Did Not; Vote	~~Doyin~~; ~~Chichi~~	Chizzy; Amaka	No; Voting	Evicted (Day 42)						2
Diana	No; Voting	Did Not; Vote	Did Not; Vote	Did Not; Vote	~~Chichi~~; ~~Sheggz~~	Chichi; Deji	No; Voting	Evicted (Day 42)						2
Amaka	No; Voting	Did Not; Vote	Did Not; Vote	Did Not; Vote	~~Adekunle~~; ~~Chichi~~	Giddyfia; Chomzy	Evicted (Day 36)							12
Pharmsavi	No; Voting	Did Not; Vote	Did Not; Vote	Did Not; Vote	Evicted (Day 28)									1
Kess	No; Voting	Did Not; Vote	Did Not; Vote	Did Not; Vote	Evicted (Day 28)									1
Khalid	No; Voting	Did Not; Vote	Did Not; Vote	Evicted (Day 21)										2
Ilebaye	No; Voting	Did Not; Vote	Did Not; Vote	Evicted (Day 21)										1
Cyph	No; Voting	Did Not; Vote	Evicted (Day 14)											1
Christy O	No; Voting	Did Not; Vote	Evicted (Day 14)											1
Beauty	No; Voting	Did Not; Vote	Ejected (Day 14)											0
Fake Housemates
Deji	Not in House	Did Not; Vote	Did Not; Vote	Did Not; Vote	~~Diana~~; ~~Doyin~~	Hermes; Doyin	Left (Day 42)							2
Modella	Not in House	Did Not; Vote	Did Not; Vote	Did Not; Vote	~~Hermes~~; ~~Amaka~~	Left (Day 35)								1
Riders
Chizzy	Not in House		Did Not; Vote	Did Not; Vote	~~Sheggz~~; ~~Bella~~	Eloswag; Bella	No; Voting	Did Not; Vote	Hermes; Adekunle; Chichi	No; Voting	Head of House	Left (Day 68)		10
Rachel	Not in House		Did Not; Vote	Did Not; Vote	~~Doyin~~; ~~Sheggz~~	Hermes; Deji	No; Voting	Did Not; Vote	Hermes; Sheggz; Allysyn	No; Voting	No; Voting	Left (Day 68)		19
Note	1, 2	3, 4a	4a, 5, 6	4a, 4b, 7	8, 9	10		11, 12	none					
Nominated (pre-save and replace)	none							Bella; Adekunle; Chomzy; Doyin; Eloswag; Phyna; ~~Chizzy~~; ~~Rachel~~	Adekunle; Hermes; Bella; Dotun; Chichi; Sheggz; ~~Rachel~~	none	none			
Saved	none							Adekunle	Chichi	Daniella; Phyna	none			
Against public vote	none	Cyph; Christy O Amaka; Khalid; Phyna	Khalid; Ilebaye; Phyna; Bryann; Groovy	~~Chizzy~~; Daniella; Kess; ~~Modella~~; Pharmsavi; Amaka; Groovy	none	Adekunle; Allysyn; Bella; Bryann; Chichi; Chomzy; Daniella; Diana; Doyin; Eloswag; Giddyfia; Groovy; Hermes; Phyna; Sheggz		Bella; Bryann; Chomzy; Doyin; Eloswag; Phyna; ~~Chizzy~~; ~~Rachel~~	Adekunle; Hermes; Bella; Dotun; Allysyn; Sheggz; ~~Rachel~~	Bryann; Bella; Adekunle; Groovy; Hermes; Sheggz	All Housemates			
Ejected	none	Beauty	none											
Evicted	No Eviction	Christy O 8.89% to save	Ilebaye; 8.51% to save	Kess; 11.1% to save	Modella; Big Brother's choice to leave	Amaka; Most votes by real housemates	Deji; Big Brother's choice to leave	Eloswag; 6.55% to save	Allysyn; 7.7% to save	Sheggz; 13.26% to save	Rachel; Chizzy; Ebuka's choice to leave	Daniella; 1.89% to win	Chichi; 2.49% to win	
Evicted	No Eviction	Cyph; 14.41% to save	Khalid; 10.72% to save	Pharmsavi; 18.59% to save	Modella; Big Brother's choice to leave	Amaka; Most votes by real housemates	Giddyfia; 0.99% to save	Chomzy; 8.96% to save	Dotun; 7.88% to save	Groovy; 14.63% to save	Rachel; Chizzy; Ebuka's choice to leave	Adekunle; 12.36% to win	Bella; 15.78% to win	
Evicted	No Eviction	Cyph; 14.41% to save	Khalid; 10.72% to save	Pharmsavi; 18.59% to save	Modella; Big Brother's choice to leave	Amaka; Most votes by real housemates	Diana; 1.45% to save	Doyin; 11.98% to save	Dotun; 7.88% to save	Hermes; 15.83% to save	Rachel; Chizzy; Ebuka's choice to leave	Bryann; 26.74% to win		
Survived	No Eviction	Khalid; 17.66% to save Amaka; 19.92% to save Phyna; 39.12% to save	Groovy; 19.68% to save Bryann; 25.18% to save Phyna; 35.91% to save	Amaka; 22.89% to save Groovy; 23.19% to save Daniella; 24.87% to save	none	none	Eloswag; 2.17% to save Chomzy; 2.61% to save Allysyn; 2.61% to save Chichi; 2.66% to save Doyin; 5.34% to save Daniella; 5.35% to save Bella; 6.83% to save Groovy; 7.69% to save Hermes; 7.92% to save Adekunle; 8.68% to save Sheggz; 9.11% to save Bryann; 14.85% to save Phyna; 21.74% to save	Bella; 14.97% to save Bryann; 23.05% to save Phyna; 34.49% to save	Sheggz; 18.62% to save Hermes; 18.67% to save Bella; 19.92% to save Adekunle; 27.23% to save	Bella; 16.44% to save Adekunle; 17.17% to save Bryann; 22.67% to save	none	Phyna; 40.74% to win		

=== Notes ===
- ^Note 1: During the 2nd launch night on the 24th of July, 2022, Ebuka announced that there would be 2 levels of the Big Brother House. The first 12 housemates would occupy the Level 2 house, while the last 12 housemates would occupy the Level 1 house.
- ^Note 2: In the Head of House games, Big Brother announced to the housemates that only the Head of House was to nominate for the week. However, when the time came for the HOH to make his nomination, Big Brother revealed that there would be no nominations, but it had to be kept secret to the rest of the house.
- ^Note 3: On the Sunday Live Show on 31 July 2022, 2 fake housemates, Deji and Modella joined the season of Big Brother Naija. Fake housemates can't be nominated and only Big Brother can walk them out of the house.
- ^Note 4a: The HOH once again was the only person who could nominate for Weeks 2–4.
- ^Note 4b: Unlike previous weeks, the Head of House had to nominate 7 housemates instead of 5.
- ^Note 5: On day 14, Beauty got ejected from the show due to repeatedly flouting the rules.
- ^Note 6: On the Sunday Live Show on 7 August 2022, 2 new housemates, known as "The Riders" joined the season of Big Brother Naija: Chizzy and Rachel. According to Ebuka, "The Riders" are basically Big Brother's agents, so they can't win the grand prize. However, they can partake in all activities in the house, can't be evicted and will play until the end.
- ^Note 7: On Day 26, Deji and Groovy swapped levels, i.e. Deji moved to Level 2 and Groovy moved to Level 1.
- ^Note 8: On the Sunday Live Show on 21 August 2022, it was announced that the Levels were scrapped. This meant that as from Week 5, the housemates had to compete under one house.
- ^Note 9: On Day 29, Ebuka announced that all nominations for Week 5 were fake.
- ^Note 10: On Day 36, it was announced that they would nominate for immediate eviction by Big Brother. Having the most votes by real housemates, Amaka was evicted. Then, all housemates except the HOH were to be against public voting.
- ^Note 11: On day 43, the housemates had to vote for three housemates instead of two. Also, the Riders could not nominate.
- ^Note 12: On the Sunday Live Show on 11 September 2022, Ebuka announced a new level, called Level 3, where, as from that night, evicted housemates would move to. Evicted housemates, now referred to as House Guests, can no longer compete for the grand prize, but can partake in all house activities except the Head of House games, and are also eligible to earn winnings from sponsored tasks.
