= Kiddwaya =

Nigerian entrepreneur

- Born: Terseer Kiddwaya; 5 March 1993 (age 33); Lagos, Nigeria
- Education: Nottingham Trent University (B.Sc, Business Management) Nottingham University Business School (M.Sc, International Business)
- Alma mater: Nottingham Trent University, United Kingdom
- Occupations: entrepreneur, Internet personality
- Awards: Venice Film Festival Award
- Website: kiddwaya.net

Terseer Kidd Waya (born 5 March 1993), known professionally as Kiddwaya, is a Nigerian entrepreneur, actor and reality TV star. He gained prominence as a contestant on the Big Brother Naija season 5.

== Early life ==
Kiddwaya was born in Lagos State, Nigeria, and hails from the Tiv ethnic group in Benue State. He is the son of Nigerian entrepreneur and politician. Terry Waya and Susan Waya. He has credited his father with having a major influence on his life and career.

He holds a bachelor's degree in business management and a master's degree in international business from Nottingham Trent University and Nottingham University Business School.

== Career ==
Kiddwaya is a businessman and involved in various business ventures including KIDD W & CO, Ciroc, BoohooMan, Durex, Turkish Airways and others.

Kiddwaya entered the Big Brother Naija house in 2020 as one of the contestants for the fifth season, known as the “Lockdown Edition.” He was evicted from the Big Brother Naija house on 13 September 2020, during the show's ninth week, a few weeks before the finale.

He has starred in the British TV series Highlife as himself alongside DJ Cuppy. The show was aired on Channel 4. Other TV series include Big Brother Naija: All Stars, How the Other Half Live, and Getting Filthy Rich Olivia Attwood. He received the Venice Film Festival award for pioneering contributions to youth empowerment and entertainment.
