= YKB (singer) =

Nigerian singer-songwriter (born 1995)

WHY KE BEE
- Also known as: YusufKanBai
- Born: Yusuf Oluwo Gbolaga; 6 March 1998 (age 28); Lagos, Nigeria
- Genres: Afrobeats, Afropop
- Occupations: Singer; songwriter
- Instrument: Vocal
- Years active: 2019–present

Yusuf Oluwo Gbolaga professionally known as YKB (born 6 March 1998) is a Nigerian Afropop singer and songwriter. He debuted his first single titled “Swaggu” in 2019 and gained popularity with the hit single “San Siro”.

== Early life ==
Yusuf Oluwo was born on 6 March 1998 in Lagos, Nigeria where he spent most of his childhood and early adulthood.

== Music career ==
YKB discovered his passion for music while he was growing up, and In 2010, he started uploading his music on SoundCloud. He was first professionally called YusufKanbai until he later shortened it to YKB.

Officially, he started his musical career in 2019 with his first debut single “Swaggu”. With the release of his first single, he gained popularity and was shortlisted for Mr Eazi's accelerator programme, “Empawa Africa”, joining 29 other musicians from across Africa in 2020. That same year, he released a new project titled “Hear Me Out”. Few weeks after, he featured on four of twelve songs released on the “Ejoya Class Of 20 project".

In January 2021, he released another single “Dey Your Dey”, featuring Nigerian artiste, Zlatan. In April 2021, he was also featured in Laycon’s song “Fall For Me”. In August 2021, he headlined his first solo-show in Lagos. In September 2021, he released his debut EP titled “Before I Blow” comprising 6 tracks.

In September 2022, he released another single “San Siro”. In May 2023, he released his second EP titled “Yusuful Music” comprising 5 tracks including “pressure”, “traffic” and “komplete riddim”.

== Discography ==
=== EPs/Albums ===
Release date	Title	Details	Ref
September 2021	Before I Blow	Number of Tracks: 6; Formats: Streaming, digital download	
May 2023	Yusuful Music	Number of Tracks: 5; Formats: Streaming, digital download	
February 2024	Yusful Music Reloaded	Number of Tracks: 8; Formats: Streaming, digital download	

=== Singles ===
==== As lead artiste ====
- Mind Games (2021)
- Dey your Dey featuring Zlatan (2021)
- Oshofree (2021)
- Imagine (2022)
- If (2022)
- San Siro remix featuring Joeboy (2023)
- Omobanke (2024)
