= Big Brother Naija season 6 =

Nigerian television show

Big Brother Naija
- Season 6
- Presented by: Ebuka Obi-Uchendu
- No. of days: 71
- No. of housemates: 26
- Winner: Hazel Oyeze "Whitemoney" Onou
- Runner-up: Roseline Omokhoa "Liquorose" Afije

Release
- Original network: Africa Magic
- Original release: 24 July – 3 October 2021

Season chronology
- ← Previous; Season 5 Next → Season 7

Big Brother Naija Season 6, also known as Big Brother Naija: Shine Ya Eye, is the sixth season of the Nigerian adaptation of the reality show Big Brother. It premiered on 24 and 25 July, 2021 on DStv channel 198 and GOtv channel 29. Ebuka Obi-Uchendu returned as host for the 5th consecutive season.

The headline sponsor of the show was Abeg and the associate sponsor was Patricia. Other sponsors included travelbeta, Darling hair, WAW and a host of many others.

According to the organizers of the show MultiChoice, the winner of the season six is expected to win a total of ₦90 million grand prize which includes a ₦30 million cash prize, cash in an Abeg digital wallet, bitcoins courtesy of Patricia, a two-bedroom apartment courtesy of RevolutionPlus Property, a top of the range SUV from a Nigerian automaker, Innoson Motors and a trip for two packaged by Travelbeta.

== Auditions ==
Due to the COVID-19 pandemic, a virtual audition was held to select contestants for the show from 3 May 2021 to 16 May 2021. Interested contestants were told to record and submit a two-minute video stating why they should appear on the show.

== Housemates ==
Housemates	Age on Entry	Occupation	Residence/Birthplace	Day entered	Day exited	Status
Hazel Oyeze "Whitemoney" Onou	29	Businessman, entrepreneur	Lagos	0A	70	Winner
Roseline Omokhoa "Liquorose" Afije	26	Content creator, professional dancer	Edo State	0B	70	Runner-up
Pere Egbi	35	Nurse, actor, model	Warri	0A	70	3rd Place
Ikechukwu Sunday Cross Okonkwo	30	Fitness enthusiast, entrepreneur	Kano/Lagos	0A	70	4th Place
Angel Agnes Smith	21	Writer, poet	Akwa Ibom	0B	70	5th Place
Emmanuel Umoh	24	Model, entrepreneur	Port Harcourt/Akwa Ibom	0A	70	6th Place
Queen Mercy Atang	26	Philanthropist, aspiring politician	Akwa Ibom	14	63	Evicted
Anita "Nini" Singh	27	Economist, fashion entrepreneur	Abuja/Edo State	0B	63	Evicted
Adeoluwa "Saga" Okusaga	28	Offshore engineer	Port Harcourt/Lagos	0A	63	Evicted
Tsakute "Saskay" Jonah	21	Fine artist, model, actress, rapper, singer	Adamawa State/Lagos	0B	56	Evicted
Yusuf "Yousef" Garba	29	Secondary school teacher	Jos	0A	56	Evicted
Jackie "Jackie B" Bent	29	Interior designer	Adamawa State/UK	0B	49	Evicted
Paul "Jaypaul" Ephraim	29	Musician, actor	Lagos/Calabar	0A	49	Evicted
Michael Chukwuebuka Ngene	28	Musician, aspiring filmmaker	Abuja/Lagos/US	14	42	Evicted
Boma Akpore	34	Bartender	Yaba, Lagos	0A	42	Evicted
Peace Ogor	26	Entrepreneur	Port Harcourt	0B	42	Evicted
Tega Dominic	29	Entrepreneur	Cross River State	0B	42	Evicted
Maria Chike Agueze	29	Realtor	Dubai/Imo State	0B	35	Evicted
Samuel Jacob "Sammie" Alifa	26	Amateur filmmaker, student	Zaria	0A	35	Evicted
Jumoke Zainab "JMK" Adedoyin	23	Law graduate	Kwara State	14	35	Evicted
Gbolahan "Kayvee" Ololade	26	Photographer	Lagos/Ogun State	14	22	Walked
Princess Francis	30	Service driver, business owner	Abuja	0B	21	Evicted
Arinola "Arin" Olowoporoku	29	Fashion designer, independent arts and culture curator	Lagos	0B	21	Evicted
Beatrice Agba Nwaji	28	Fashion model, up-and-coming actress	Port Harcourt	0B	14	Evicted
Adeniyi "Niyi" Lawal	33	Computer engineer	Oyo State	0A	14	Evicted
Yerimene Abraham "Yerins" Saibakumo	27	Doctor	Bayelsa	0A	14	Evicted

The 1st launch night (24 July) is marked as Day 0A. The 2nd launch night (25 July) is marked as Day 0B. The day after is Day 1.

== Voting history and nominations table ==
	Week 1	Week 2	Week 3	Week 4	Week 5	Week 6	Week 7	Week 8	Week 9		Week 10 Final	Nominations & votes received
Head(s) of House	Peace	Boma	Pere	Maria	Liquorose	Jackie B	Emmanuel	Whitemoney	Liquorose		Emmanuel	Nominations & votes received
Head(s) of House	Peace	Boma	Pere	Maria	Liquorose	Jaypaul	Emmanuel	Whitemoney	Liquorose		Emmanuel	Nominations & votes received
Deputy Head of House	Yousef	Jackie B	Maria	Boma	Saga	none	Liquorose	Queen	Cross		Liquorose	Nominations & votes received
Veto Power Holder	none						Pere	Nini	Emmanuel		none	Nominations & votes received
Whitemoney	No; Voting	Did Not; Vote	Arin; Jaypaul	No; Voting	Pere; Peace	No; Voting	Saga; Saskay	Angel; Yousef	No; Voting		Winner (Day 70)	7
Liquorose	No; Voting	Did Not; Vote	Saga; Arin	No; Voting	Cross; Peace	No; Voting	Saga; Cross	Angel; Yousef	Head of House		Runner-up (Day 70)	3
Pere	No; Voting	Beatrice; Yerins; Niyi; Whitemoney	Princess; Saskay	No; Voting	Michael; Jaypaul	No; Voting	Angel; Whitemoney	Nini; Angel	No; Voting	Fake Eviction (Day 63)	3rd place (Day 70)	15
Cross	No; Voting	Did Not; Vote	Princess; Tega	No; Voting	Pere; Sammie	No; Voting	Saga; Liquorose	Nini; Whitemoney	Deputy Head of House		4th place (Day 70)	3
Angel	No; Voting	Did Not; Vote	Princess; Emmanuel	No; Voting	Queen; Michael	No; Voting	Emmanuel; Saga	Saga; Emmanuel	No; Voting	Fake Eviction (Day 63)	5th place (Day 70)	3
Emmanuel	No; Voting	Did Not; Vote	Arin; Angel	No; Voting	Peace; Pere	No; Voting	Yousef; Jackie B	Saskay; Pere	(Ultimate) Veto; Power Holder		6th place (Day 70)	9
Queen	Not in House		Exempt	No; Voting	Pere; Peace	No; Voting	Saskay; Pere	Yousef; Saskay	No; Voting		Evicted (Day 63)	6
Nini	No; Voting	Did Not; Vote	Princess; Emmanuel	No; Voting	Sammie; JMK	No; Voting	Pere; Jaypaul	Emmanuel; Angel	No; Voting		Evicted (Day 63)	6
Saga	No; Voting	Did Not; Vote	Princess; Tega	No; Voting	Sammie; Queen	No; Voting	Jackie B Jaypaul	Angel; Yousef	No; Voting		Evicted (Day 63)	10
Saskay	No; Voting	Did Not; Vote	Whitemoney; Nini	No; Voting	Boma; Pere	No; Voting	Whitemoney; Liquorose	Yousef; Emmanuel	Evicted (Day 56)			6
Yousef	Deputy Head of House	Did Not; Vote	Arin; Boma	No; Voting	Jaypaul; Queen	No; Voting	Emmanuel; Queen	Liquorose; Cross	Evicted (Day 56)			6
Jackie B	No; Voting	Deputy Head of House	Saga; Nini	No; Voting	Pere; Angel	Head of House	Pere; Saga	Evicted (Day 49)				2
Jaypaul	No; Voting	Did Not; Vote	Maria; Peace	No; Voting	Pere; Maria	Head of House	Nini; Pere	Evicted (Day 49)				6
Michael	Not in House		Exempt	No; Voting	Angel; JMK	No; Voting	Evicted (Day 42)					2
Boma	No; Voting	Head of House	Saskay; Princess	Deputy Head of House	JMK; Pere	No; Voting	Evicted (Day 42)					2
Peace	Head of House	Did Not; Vote	Tega; Princess	No; Voting	Queen; Emmanuel	No; Voting	Evicted (Day 42)					6
Tega	No; Voting	Did Not; Vote	Nini; Arin	No; Voting	Saga; Peace	No; Voting	Evicted (Day 42)					5
Maria	No; Voting	Beatrice; Yerins; Jaypaul; Whitemoney	Arin; Angel	Head of House	Queen; Whitemoney	Evicted (Day 35)						4
Sammie	No; Voting	Did Not; Vote	Tega; Princess	No; Voting	Pere; Maria	Evicted (Day 35)						3
JMK	Not in House		Exempt	No; Voting	Pere; Maria	Evicted (Day 35)						3
Kayvee	Not in House		Exempt	Walked (Day 22)								0
Princess	No; Voting	Did Not; Vote	Saga; Arin	Evicted (Day 21)								7
Arin	No; Voting	Did Not; Vote	Emmanuel; Tega	Evicted (Day 21)								7
Beatrice	No; Voting	Did Not; Vote	Evicted (Day 14)									2
Niyi	No; Voting	Did Not; Vote	Evicted (Day 14)									1
Yerins	No; Voting	Did Not; Vote	Evicted (Day 14)									2
Note	1	2, 3	none	4, 5	none	6, 7	8	9	10, 11, 12		none	
Nominated (pre-save and replace)	none	Beatrice; Jaypaul; Niyi; Whitemoney; Yerins	Arin; Emmanuel; Nini; Princess; Saga; Tega	none	Pere; Queen; Peace; Sammie; JMK; Maria	none	Pere; Saga; Liquorose; Whitemoney; Jaypaul; Saskay; Jackie B Emmanuel	Nini; Saskay; Yousef; Emmanuel; Angel	none			
Saved	none	Jaypaul	Saga	none	Peace	none	Emmanuel; Pere	Nini	none			
Against public vote	none	Beatrice; Niyi; Whitemoney; Yerins; Yousef	Arin; Emmanuel; Nini; Princess; Saskay; Tega	none	Pere; Queen; Cross; Sammie; JMK; Maria	Angel; Boma; Cross; Emmanuel; Liquorose; Michael; Nini; Peace; Pere; Queen; Saga; Saskay; Tega; Whitemoney; Yousef	Queen; Saga; Liquorose; Whitemoney; Jaypaul; Saskay; Jackie B	Cross; Saskay; Yousef; Emmanuel; Angel	Angel; Nini; Pere; Queen; Saga; Whitemoney		All Housemates	
Walked	none			Kayvee	none							
Evicted	No Eviction	Yerins; 7.29% to save	Arin; 6.46% to save	No Eviction	JMK; 4.64% to save	Tega; 0.67% to save	Jaypaul; 3.77% to save	Yousef; 12.88% to save	Saga; 1.95% to save		Emmanuel; 3.92% to win	
Evicted	No Eviction	Yerins; 7.29% to save	Arin; 6.46% to save	No Eviction	JMK; 4.64% to save	Peace; 0.81% to save	Jaypaul; 3.77% to save	Yousef; 12.88% to save	Saga; 1.95% to save		Angel; 4.47% to win	
Evicted	No Eviction	Niyi; 8.34% to save	Princess; 10.23% to save	No Eviction	Sammie; 10.21% to save	Boma; 0.96% to save	Jackie B 4.26% to save	Saskay; 15.41% to save	Nini; 2.16% to save		Cross; 6.44% to win	
Evicted	No Eviction	Beatrice; 12.95% to save	Princess; 10.23% to save	No Eviction	Maria; 13.73% to save	Michael; 1.62% to save	Jackie B 4.26% to save	Saskay; 15.41% to save	Queen; 9.08% to save		Pere; 14.77% to win	
Evicted	No Eviction	Beatrice; 12.95% to save	Princess; 10.23% to save	No Eviction	Maria; 13.73% to save	Michael; 1.62% to save	Jackie B 4.26% to save	Saskay; 15.41% to save	Queen; 9.08% to save		Liquorose; 22.99% to win	
Survived	No Eviction	Yousef; 17.26% to save Whitemoney; 54.16% to save	Tega; 14.61% to save Nini; 17.38% to save Emmanuel; 24.18% to save Saskay; 27.14% to save	No Eviction	Pere; 14.17% to save Queen; 18.64% to save Cross; 38.61% to save	Saga; 1.73% to save Nini; 2.16% to save Saskay; 4.49% to save Emmanuel; 4.67% to save Yousef; 4.99% to save Queen; 5.44% to save Angel; 7.26% to save Cross; 8.99% to save Pere; 10.92% to save Liquorose; 12.57% to save Whitemoney; 32.70% to save	Saga; 8.2% to save Saskay; 10.37% to save Queen; 14.43% to save Liquorose; 19.40% to save Whitemoney; 39.57& to save	Angel; 16.22% to save Emmanuel; 24.89% to save Cross; 30.6% to save	Angel; 14.63% to save Pere; 25.31% to save Whitemoney; 46.87% to save		Whitemoney; 46.52% to win	

Full voting percentages were revealed on the official site on 8 October 2021.

=== Notes ===
- ^Note 1: During the 2nd launch night on the 25th of July, 2021, Big Brother announced that there were 2 fake housemates, called wildcards, that were revealed at the end of Week 1's Sunday show. The two wildcards were revealed to be Maria and Pere that day. Since the housemates guessed incorrectly, no one got evicted on that day.
- ^Note 2: For going undetected, the wildcards; Maria and Pere were given the opportunity to nominate the other housemates outside the Head of House for eviction.
- ^Note 3: On Day 14, Big Brother introduced 4 new housemates to the Big Brother house: JMK, Michael, Kayvee and Queen.
- ^Note 4: Kayvee exited the Big Brother house on Day 22 voluntarily due to health-related issues.
- ^Note 5: Big Brother informed Maria that as Head of House, there will be no nominations or eviction in week 4. She was however given a secret task to make the housemates believe that the two housemates who impress her the least will be evicted on Sunday.
- ^Note 6: For the week's Head of House games, Big Brother announced that there will be 2 Heads of House.
- ^Note 7: On the same day, it was also announced that all housemates apart from the 2 Heads of House would be up for public voting.
- ^Note 8: Big Brother introduced a nomination twist as nominations were done before the Head of House games and the housemates had the opportunity of saving themselves from the nomination list.
- ^Note 9:The nomination twist used in week 7 was reapplied in week 8.
- ^Note 10: In week 9, Big Brother decided to scrap the Head of House games, replacing them with the Ultimate Veto Power Holder Games. The Ultimate Veto Power Holder not only had the power of immunity from public voting, but they could pick both the Head and Deputy Head of House.
- ^Note 11: Also, in the same week, everyone except the Ultimate Veto Power Holder, Head of House and Deputy Head of House were up for public voting.
- ^Note 12: Due to an eviction twist on day 63, while Pere and Angel left the house, they have not left the show. A day later, both housemates returned to the house.
