= Big Brother Naija season 5 =

Nigerian television show

Big Brother Naija
- Season 5
- Presented by: Ebuka Obi-Uchendu
- No. of days: 71
- No. of housemates: 20
- Winner: Olamilekan "Laycon" Agbeleshe
- Runner-up: Dorathy Bachor

Release
- Original network: Africa Magic
- Original release: 19 July – 27 September 2020

Season chronology
- ← Previous; Season 4 Next → Season 6

Big Brother Naija Season 5, also known as Big Brother Naija: Lockdown, is the fifth season of the Nigerian version of the reality show Big Brother. It premiered on 19 July 2020 on Africa Magic with a live feed available on DStv channel 198 and GOtv channel 29. Ex-housemate Ebuka Obi-Uchendu from season one returned as host.

The winner of this season was Laycon and he won ₦85 million worth of prizes.

== Auditions ==
Due to the COVID-19 pandemic, a virtual audition was held to select contestants for the show. Video submissions were received from 20 May to 30 May 2020. Interested contestants submitted a two-minute video stating why they should appear on the show. At the end of the online audition, over 30,000 contestants showed their interest. Of the 30,000 contestants that showed interest, 20 housemates were selected.

== Nomination and eviction voting format ==
In the previous seasons, housemates nominated two of their fellow housemates for eviction. The public then voted for the housemates they wanted to save. In that format, the housemate who received the fewest votes would be evicted. In this season, the nomination and eviction format was reversed for the first half only.

Each week, all housemates, except the Head of House and Deputy Head of House, face the public vote. Public voting is opened every Monday night after the Head of House Game and closes on that week's Thursday night. The four housemates who receive the fewest votes will be nominated for eviction by the housemates.

During the live eviction shows every Sunday, the nominated housemates at risk face a Diary Eviction Votes Session to determine who among them will be evicted. In the Diary Room, each housemate votes on one or two of the bottom four housemates who they want to leave. The housemate who receives the most votes is then evicted.

During the sixth live eviction show on Day 42, the host Ebuka announced that the voting system would be switching back to the old one, with housemates nominating who they want to evict and the public voting who among these housemates to evict.

== Housemates ==
Housemates	Age on Entry	Occupation	Residence/Birthplace	Day entered	Day exited	Status
Olamilekan "Laycon" Agbeleshe	26	Singer and rapper	Lagos	0	70	Winner
Dorathy Bachor	24	Entrepreneur	Lagos	0	70	Runner-up
Rebecca "Nengi" Hampson	22	Entrepreneur	Bayelsa	0	70	3rd Place
Emuobonuvie "Neo" Akpofure	26	Ride-hailing app driver	Delta	0	70	4th Place
Victoria "Vee" Adeyele	23	Musician	Lagos/London, UK	0	70	5th Place
Ozoemena Chukwu "Ozo"	27	Consultant and entrepreneur	Imo	0	63	Evicted
Timmy Sinclair "Trikytee"	35	Creative artist and storyteller	Lagos, Bayelsa	0	63	Evicted
Nelson Enwerem "Prince"	24	Model, fashion designer and interior decorator	Lagos/Abia	0	56	Evicted
Terseer "Kiddwaya" Waya	27	Self-employed	Benue	0	56	Evicted
Lucy Essien	30	Entrepreneur	Lagos	0	49	Evicted
Erica Nlewedim	26	Actress and commercial model	Lagos	0	49	Ejected
Ezekiel Bright "Brighto" Osemudiame	29	Sailor	Edo	0	42	Evicted
Florence Wathoni Anyansi	29	Fashion entrepreneur and parenting blogger	Karatina, Kenya	0	42	Evicted
Tolani "Tolanibaj" Shobajo	27	Media personality	Lagos	0	42	Evicted
Praise Nelson	28	Dancer	Enugu, Enugu State	0	35	Evicted
Aisha Umaru "Kaisha"	25	Entrepreneur	Sokoto	0	28	Evicted
Eric Akhigbe	24	Student, fitness enthusiast and bodybuilder	Lagos/Edo	0	21	Evicted
Tochukwu Okechukwu Tochi	28	Rapper and real estate agent	Imo	0	21	Evicted
Boluwatife "Lilo" Aderogba	23	Entrepreneur and dietitian	Lagos	0	14	Evicted
Kate "Ka3na" Jones	26	Entrepreneur	Rivers	0	14	Evicted

The launch night is marked as Day 0. The day after is Day 1.

== Public nomination percentages ==
The public voted for their favourite housemate. Voting started on Monday and closed on Thursday. On Sunday's live eviction show, only housemates at the bottom were revealed.

Full percentages were revealed on 1 October 2020 on the official website.

Public nomination phase
	Week 2	Week 3	Week 4	Week 5	Week 6
Brighto	3.52%	4.20%	3.76%	3.86%	2.68%
Dorathy	9.30%	DHOH	10.89%	8.48%	8.54%
Erica	15.60%	16.20%	HOH	17.28%	16.09%
Kiddwaya	6.33%	5.98%	DHOH	HOH	5.62%
Laycon	24.28%	26.55%	27.36%	25.06%	24.97%
Lucy	HOH	4.08%	7.71%	5.42%	4.41%
Nengi	10.62%	12.73%	12.05%	10.69%	DHOH
Neo	3.76%	3.67%	3.13%	7.31%	6.90%
Ozo	8..84%	HOH	8.09%	6.79%	HOH
Prince	DHOH	5.54%	4.97%	3.84%	7.64%
Tolanibaj	1.84%	3.30%	3.77%	DHOH	2.75%
Trikytee	1.61%	2.29%	3.47%	3.58%	8.80%
Vee	2.47%	3.26%	3.89%	2.79%	8.03%
Wathoni	2.93%	2.76%	3.25%	3.25%	3.57%
Praise	1.28%	2.99%	4.18%	1.65%	
Kaisha	1.63%	2.41%	3.48%		
Eric	1.37%	1.91%			
Tochi	1.82%	2.11%			
Lilo	1.52%				
Ka3na	1.28%				

== Voting history and nominations table ==
	Voting to Evict						Nominate to Evict					Nominations & votes received
	Week 1	Week 2	Week 3	Week 4	Week 5	Week 6	Week 7	Week 8	Week 9	Week 10 Final		Nominations & votes received
Head of House	Nengi	Lucy	Ozo	Erica	Kiddwaya	Ozo	Erica	Trikytee	Nengi	none		Nominations & votes received
Deputy Head of House	Wathoni	Prince	Dorathy	Kiddwaya	Tolanibaj	Nengi	Prince	Laycon	none			Nominations & votes received
Laycon	No; Voting	Ka3na; Eric	Eric; Trikytee	Trikytee; Kaisha	Wathoni; Trikytee	No; Voting	Trikytee; Lucy	Ozo; Dorathy	**Ozo**; **Dorathy**	**Winner** (Day 70)		5
Dorathy	No; Voting	Eric; Lilo	Tochi; Eric	Trikytee; Kaisha	Vee; Trikytee	No; Voting	Vee; Laycon	Kiddwaya; Neo	**Trikytee**; **Laycon**	**Runner-up** (Day 70)		6
Nengi	Head of House	Ka3na; Praise	Kaisha; Eric	Kaisha; Wathoni	Praise; Wathoni	Deputy Head of House	Lucy; Laycon	Dorathy; Prince	Head of House	**Third place** (Day 70)		3
Neo	No; Voting	Ka3na; Lilo	Kaisha; Tochi	Bottom Four	Wathoni; Praise	No; Voting	Kiddwaya; Lucy	Prince; Dorathy	**Trikytee**; **Laycon**	**Fourth place** (Day 70)		1
Vee	No; Voting	Ka3na; Lilo	Eric; Kaisha	Kaisha; Wathoni	Bottom Four	No; Voting	Trikytee; Dorathy	Prince; Dorathy	**Ozo**; **Dorathy**	**Fifth place** (Day 70)		8
Ozo	No; Voting	Ka3na; Lilo	Kaisha; Tochi	Kaisha; Trikytee	Praise; Trikytee	Head of House	Lucy; Kiddwaya	Prince; Kiddwaya	**Trikytee**; **Laycon**	Evicted (Day 63)		4
Trikytee	No; Voting	Ka3na; Praise	Bottom Four	Bottom Four	Bottom Four	No; Voting	Lucy; Laycon	Prince; Kiddwaya	**Ozo**; **Dorathy**	Evicted (Day 63)		19
Kiddwaya	No; Voting	Ka3na; Lilo	Kaisha; Eric	Kaisha; Wathoni	Vee; Praise; **Praise**	No; Voting	Lucy; Trikytee	Vee; Prince	Evicted (Day 56)			5
Prince	No; Voting	Eric; Lilo	Kaisha; Tochi	Kaisha; Wathoni	Wathoni; Vee	No; Voting	Nengi; Ozo	Ozo; Nengi	Evicted (Day 56)			6
Lucy	No; Voting	Eric; Lilo	Kaisha; Tochi	Trikytee; Wathoni	Wathoni; Trikytee	No; Voting	Nengi; Trikytee	Evicted (Day 49)				6
Erica	No; Voting	Eric; Lilo	Tochi; Kaisha	Kaisha; Wathoni	Wathoni; Vee	No; Voting	Vee; Laycon	Ejected (Day 49)				0
Brighto	No; Voting	Eric; Ka3na	Trikytee; Eric	Trikytee; Kaisha	Trikytee; Praise	No; Voting	Evicted (Day 42)					0
Wathoni	Deputy Head of House	Ka3na; Praise	Tochi; Eric	Bottom Four	Bottom Four	No; Voting	Evicted (Day 42)					12
Tolanibaj	No; Voting	Ka3na; Eric	Eric; Tochi	Trikytee; Wathoni	Praise; Vee	No; Voting	Evicted (Day 42)					0
Praise	No; Voting	Bottom Four	Tochi; Eric	Kaisha; Trikytee	Bottom Four	Evicted (Day 35)						11
Kaisha	No; Voting	Ka3na; Lilo	Bottom Four	Bottom Four	Evicted (Day 28)							19
Eric	No; Voting	Bottom Four	Bottom Four	Evicted (Day 21)								17
Tochi	No; Voting	Praise; Eric	Bottom Four	Evicted (Day 21)								9
Lilo	No; Voting	Bottom Four	Evicted (Day 14)									9
Ka3na	No; Voting	Bottom Four	Evicted (Day 14)									11
Note	none	1	none	2	2, 3	4	5	none	6	none		
Against public vote	none	All Housemates					Kiddwaya; Laycon; Lucy; Nengi; Trikytee; Vee	Dorathy; Kiddwaya; Ozo; Prince	Dorathy; Laycon; Ozo; Trikytee	All Housemates		
Bottom four	none	Lilo; Eric; Ka3na; Praise	Eric; Kaisha; Tochi; Trikytee	Trikytee; Kaisha; Wathoni; Neo	Trikytee; Wathoni; Praise; Vee	none						
Ejected	none	none					**Erica**	none				
Evicted	No; Eviction	**Ka3na**; 11 of 16 votes to evict	**Eric**; 9 of 14 votes to evict	**Kaisha**; 11 of 12 votes to evict	**Praise**; 7 of 12 votes to evict	**Tolanibaj**; 2.75% to save	**Lucy**; 8.12% to save	**Prince**; 20.53% to save	**Trikytee**; 4.10% to save	**Vee**; 1.18% to win	**Neo**; 1.94% to win	
Evicted	No; Eviction	**Ka3na**; 11 of 16 votes to evict	**Eric**; 9 of 14 votes to evict	**Kaisha**; 11 of 12 votes to evict	**Praise**; 7 of 12 votes to evict	**Wathoni**; 3.57% to save	**Lucy**; 8.12% to save	**Prince**; 20.53% to save	**Trikytee**; 4.10% to save	**Vee**; 1.18% to win	**Neo**; 1.94% to win	
Evicted	No; Eviction	**Lilo**; 9 of 16 votes to evict	**Tochi**; 9 of 14 votes to evict	**Kaisha**; 11 of 12 votes to evict	**Praise**; 7 of 12 votes to evict	**Wathoni**; 3.57% to save	**Lucy**; 8.12% to save	**Kiddwaya**; 24.92% to save	**Ozo**; 19.11% to save	**Nengi**; 15.03% to win	**Dorathy**; 21.85% to win	
Evicted	No; Eviction	**Lilo**; 9 of 16 votes to evict	**Tochi**; 9 of 14 votes to evict	**Kaisha**; 11 of 12 votes to evict	**Praise**; 7 of 12 votes to evict	**Brighto**; 2.68% to save	**Lucy**; 8.12% to save	**Kiddwaya**; 24.92% to save	**Ozo**; 19.11% to save	**Nengi**; 15.03% to win	**Dorathy**; 21.85% to win	
Saved	No; Eviction	**Eric**; 8 of 16 votes **Praise**; 4 of 16 votes	**Kaisha**; 8 of 14 votes **Trikytee**; 2 of 14 votes	**Trikytee**; 7 of 12 votes **Wathoni**; 6 of 12 votes **Neo**; 0 of 12 votes	**Wathoni**; 6 of 11 votes **Trikytee**; 5 of 11 votes **Vee**; 5 of 11 votes	**Top 6**; 74.07% **Neo**; 6.90% **Kiddwaya**; 5.62% **Lucy**; 4.41%	**Laycon**; 41.41% **Kiddwaya**; 16.20% **Nengi**; 13.32% **Trikytee**; 11.19% **Vee**; 9.76%	**Ozo**; 27.97% **Dorathy**; 26.58%	**Laycon**; 50.11% **Dorathy**; 26.68%	**Laycon**; 60% to win		

=== Notes ===
- **^Note 1**: During the eviction show on Day 14, the host Ebuka announced that two housemates will be evicted from the house.
- **^Note 2**: Only one housemate was evicted rather than two during the eviction show.
- **^Note 3**: As the vote was a tie between Praise and Wathoni, the Head of House, Kiddwaya, must cast a tie-breaker vote (in **bold**). He voted for Praise.
- **^Note 4**: During the sixth live eviction show, Ebuka announced a twist that a triple eviction will occur and housemates did not vote to evict in the Diary Room like in prior weeks. Evictions were only based on the voting percentages of favourite housemate voting by the public. At the end of the show, the host announced another twist that starting from Day 43, the voting format was changed back to the old one, with housemates nominating and the public voting to evict.
- **^Note 5**: Erica was ejected from the house on Day 49 for disregarding the rules and the show's process.
- **^Note 6**: For Week 9's nomination, the housemates were divided into two teams, with membership determined through a random draw. Team Black: Dorathy, Neo, and Ozo. Team White: Laycon, Trikytee, and Vee. The Head of House, Nengi, does not belong to any team. Each team directly nominated two housemates from the other team for eviction.
