= Etsanyi Tukura =

43rd Miss Nigeria

Beauty Etsanyi Tukura, Miss Nigeria 2019
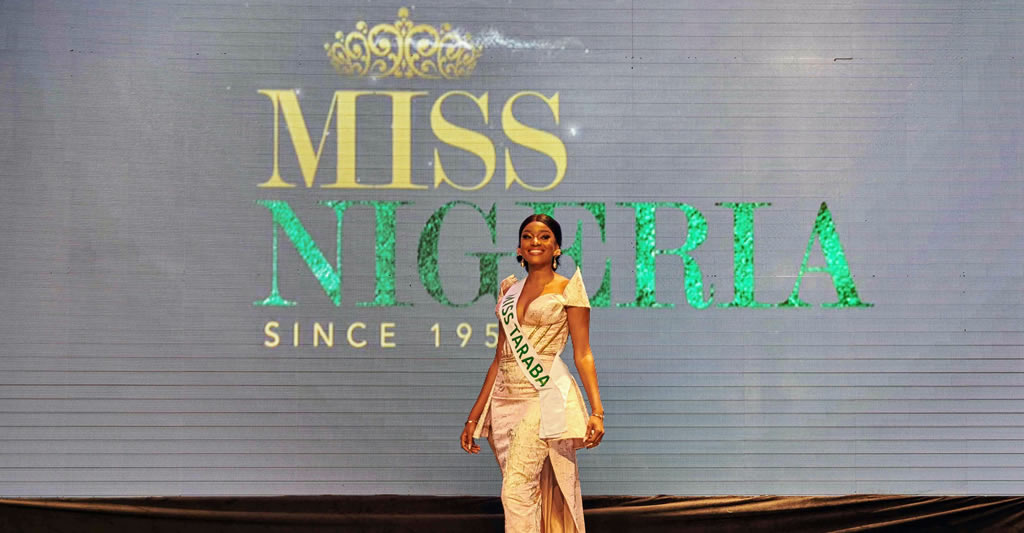
- Born: Taraba State
- Beauty pageant titleholder
- Title: 43rd Miss Nigeria
- Major competitions: 43rd Miss Nigeria (Winner); Miss Nigeria 2019

Beauty Etsanyi Tukura (born 21 October 1997) is a Nigerian entrepreneur and beauty pageant titleholder and TV personality. In 2019, she won the 43rd Miss Nigeria 2019 competition.

== Early life ==
Tukura was born in the city of Port Harcourt, Nigeria, the youngest of four children. She attended Nigerian Navy Secondary School, Ojo, Lagos, for her secondary education. Due to health challenges, she had to move away to continue her Senior Secondary School education at the American University of Nigeria Academy, Yola, Nigeria. In 2019, Tukura represented Taraba state at the Miss Nigeria pageant at Eko Convention Center, Lagos, and won.

== Career ==
=== Pageantry ===
In the 43rd Miss Nigeria pageant, she contested against fellow TV star Anita Osikweme Osikhena, who came second. Before competing in the pageant, Tukura was a lawyer and entrepreneur. She manages her online business known as StylishBeauty, where she retails original branded items from various designers worldwide. She was a distributor for international fashion brands before joining the Big Brother House.

=== Big Brother Naija ===
At the start of Big Brother Naija season 7, Tukura was unveiled as the second housemate to enter the Big Brother house. She was disqualified from the show two weeks later after receiving three strikes for breaking Big Brother's rules and damaging property.

Awards and achievements
Preceded by Chidinma Aaron	43nd Miss Nigeria; 2019	Succeeded by Shatu Garko
