= Whitemoney =

Nigerian reality TV personality, singer and songwriter

- Born: Hazel Oyeze Onou; Kaduna, Nigeria
- Other name: Mazi
- Occupations: Singer, songwriter
- Known for: Winner of the Big Brother Naija season 6
- Television: Big Brother Naija
- Musical career
- Genres: Afro-Pop; hip hop
- Instruments: Vocals, Piano
- Years active: 2018–present

Hazel Oyeze Onou, popularly known as Whitemoney, is a Nigerian singer, songwriter and reality television personality. He was the winner of Big Brother Naija season 6.

== Early life ==
Whitemoney is of Igbo descent from Enugu State, south-eastern region of Nigeria, but he grew up in Kaduna State, northern region Nigeria. Growing up, Whitemoney did not progress beyond the NECO level in his academic pursuit.

== Career ==
Growing up in Kaduna State, Whitemoney moved to Lagos in search of job opportunities. He ventured into different businesses such as commercial photography, barbering, repairing generators, and fixing telecommunication towers among others. He also invested in importing and selling shoes.

=== Musical career ===
Whitemoney has released a few songs, including "Rosemary" (2018), "Your Life" (2018), and "My Heart" (2021). On 3 December 2021 he released the single "Selense" which was produced by Masterkraft. The song was released alongside its music video.

=== Big Brother Naija ===
Whitemoney entered the sixth season of Big Brother Naija as the fifth contestant on 24 July 2021.

During the season finale of the show on 3 October 2021, he was declared the winner scoring 47% of the final votes ahead of Liquorose with 22.99% of the total votes cast and was entitled to the ₦90 million grand prize.

In July 2023, he was announced as one of the housemates for the eighth season of Big Brother Naija All Stars.On 17 September 2023, he was evicted from the show, finishing in 11th place after Alex.

== Filmography ==
=== Reality television series ===
Year	Title	Role	Notes
2021	Big Brother Naija 6	Contestant	Won
2023	Big Brother Naija 8 All Stars	Contestant	11th Place
