= Laycon =

Nigerian rapper and singer-songwriter

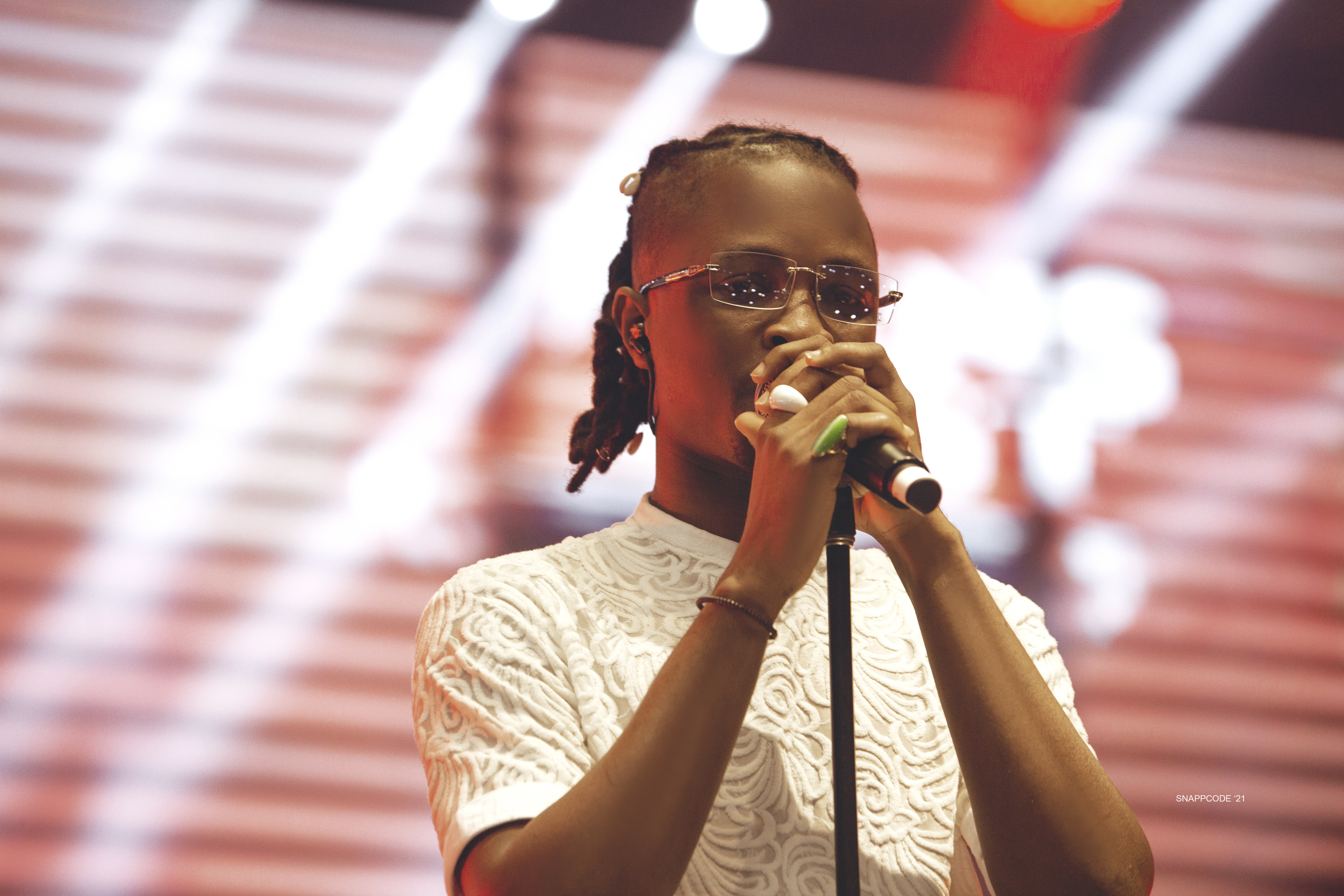
- Laycon at iCONs FEST, 2021
- Born: Olamilekan Massoud Al-Khalifah Agbeleshebioba; 8 November 1993 (age 32); Lagos, Nigeria
- Education: University of Lagos, University of Portsmouth
- Occupations: Rapper; singer; songwriter; media personality; reality TV star
- Musical career
- Genres: Rap; AfroRap; hip hop; afrobeats
- Instruments: Vocals, guitar
- Years active: 2016–present
- Label: Fierce Nation

Olamilekan Massoud Al-Khalifah Agbeleshebioba (born 8 November 1993), known professionally as Laycon, is a Nigerian rapper, singer, songwriter and media personality. He was the winner of Big Brother Naija season 5 and is a youth ambassador of Ogun State, since 6 October 2020. In October 2022, he became a member of the Grammys Recording Academy voting committee.

== Early life and education ==
Olamilekan Massoud Al-Khalifah Agbeleshebioba was born and raised in Lagos, Nigeria and is a native of Odeda, Ogun State. He attended Lagos State Model College Merian, Nigeria. In 2012, he got admitted to study philosophy in the University of Lagos and graduated in 2016 with a Second Class Upper degree. In April 2023, he graduated with a Master of Arts (MA) in International Relations from the University of Portsmouth, England.

== Career ==
Laycon started his career interning as the personal assistant to the MD and CEO of Latjum Global Nigeria Limited when he was still an undergraduate in University of Lagos. He moved to Bestman Games, Ikoyi, Lagos where he worked as a sales and business development personnel after graduating from the university. Two months later, he became the personal assistant to the assistant director of welfare in administration and human resources at Lagos State Ministry of Information and Strategy. During the course of his career, he worked as a freelance writer for different companies and establishments. On 6 October 2020, Laycon was appointed youth ambassador by the governor of Ogun State, Dapo Abiodun.

On 3 January 2021, Laycon received a chieftaincy title of Akeweje of Ipokia Kingdom from the Onipokia of Ipokia, Yisa Adesola Olaniyan at the 2021 Opo Day celebration.

=== Music career ===
Laycon began rapping and writing songs at an early age. In 2014, he was among the ten artistes that performed at the 2014 Coke Studio University of Lagos event. He was a top ten finalist in the 2017 MTV Base LSB challenge. In 2019, Laycon was signed to Olugbenga Jackson's record label, Fierce Nation. On 21 February 2019, he released a track, "Fierce" featuring Chinko Ekun and Reminisce from his second EP Who Is Laycon?. He released another single "Senseless" on 28 August 2020.

In October 2020, the remix of "Nobody" by DJ Neptune was released. His verse in the remix of the song titled "Nobody iCONs Remix" was recorded two days after he left the Big Brother Naija Reality TV Show. Mr. Real featured him in the remix of his song "Baba Fela". The remix was released on 30 January 2021.

On 10 March 2021, Laycon released two singles - "Wagwan" and "Fall For Me" (featuring YKB). "Wagwan" debuted at number five on Billboard Top Triller Global chart. On 30 April 2021, Laycon's Album Shall We Begin was released and the album peaked at number two in Nigeria top album chart, and number one on the Nigeria iTunes album chart. The album went on to chart in over 30 countries and counting. In September 2021, Laycon release the original soundtrack album to his reality show I Am Laycon which was also titled I Am Laycon. This was his second project of the year 2021 and it peaked at number nine on Nigeria album chart. This made it Laycon's third project to hit the top 10 charts in two years. Also, he was featured on "Enter My Head" by fellow former BBNaija housemate Veeiye, on her debut EP Young & Reckless.

In July 2021, Laycon performed "All Over Me" for the Grammy Press Play. In December 2021, he headlined and sold out his first concert tagged iCONs Fest, at the 6000 capacity Eko Convention Center, Eko Hotel, Lagos. In October 2022, he became a member of the Grammys Recording Academy voting committee.

In July 2023, Laycon released his third album Bioba comprising 13 tracks. He also released two singles titled "Shine" and "LOL"

=== Big Brother Naija season 5 ===
Laycon entered the show as the nineteenth contestant on 19 July 2020 and soon established himself as a fan favorite. He became the first housemate of the season to be verified on Instagram on 22 July 2020. He was also the first housemate in the show's history to reach one million followers on Instagram while still in the house on 19 September 2020.

At the finale on 27 September 2020, he was declared the winner, receiving 60 percent of the total votes cast, and was awarded the ₦85 million grand prize.

== Discography ==
=== Mixtapes ===
- Any Given Monday (The Playlist) (2019)
- Any Given Monday II (2019)

=== EPs ===
- Young Black and Gifted (2016)
- Who is Laycon? (2020)

=== Albums ===
- Shall We Begin (2021)
- I am Laycon (The Original Soundtrack) (2021)
- Bioba (2023)

=== Singles ===
- "Fierce" (2019)
- "Senseless" (2020)
- "HipHop" (2020)
- "Fall for Me" featuring YKB (2021)
- "Wagwan" (2021)
- "New Dimension" (2022)
- "2000" (2022)
- "Shine" (2023)
- "LOL" (2023)
- "Big Chief" (2024)

== Filmography ==
=== Television ===
Year	Title	Role	Notes	Ref
2020	Big Brother season 5	Himself	Reality show	
2021	I Am Laycon	Himself	Showmax original which premiered on 11 February 2021	

== Philanthropy ==
In June 2021, the Sickle Cell Foundation of Nigeria appointed Laycon as its global advocate and ambassador for people living with sickle cell. He also founded "Laycon Cares Foundation", a humanitarian organization that focuses on education, governance and climate action. In March 2023, his foundation partnered with the Wild Africa Fund (WAF) to raise awareness about poaching and the preservation of natural habitats.

== Accolades ==
Year	Awards ceremony	Award description(s)	Recipient	Results	Ref
2020	City People Music Awards	Special Recognition Award	Himself	Won	
2020	African Entertainment Awards USA	Best New Artist	Himself	Won	
2020	Naijatraffic Awards	Artist Of The Year	Himself	Won	
2020	Naijatraffic Awards	EP/Album Of The Year	Who Is Laycon	Won	
2021	Net Honours	Most Popular BBNaija Star	Himself	Nominated	
