= Mercy Eke =

Nigerian entrepreneur and actress (born 1990)

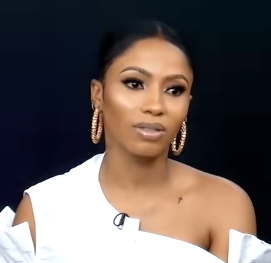
- Eke being interviewed by Wazobia Max TV in October 2019
- Born: Chinenyenwa Mercy Eke; Owerri, Imo State, Nigeria
- Education: Imo State University
- Occupations: Entrepreneur; actress; video vixen; media and tv personality
- Years active: 2019–present
- Known for: Winner of Big Brother Naija season 4
- Television: Big Brother Naija

Chinenyenwa Mercy Eke (//) is a Nigerian entrepreneur, actress, video vixen and reality TV star. She won season 4 of Big Brother Naija in 2019, becoming the first ever woman to win the reality show. She is the founder of MNM luxury and Lambo Homes. On 14 March 2020, Eke received the Africa Magic Viewers' Choice Award for Best Dressed Female.

== Early life ==
Eke graduated from Imo State University. In 2025, she enrolled in a Master of Business Administration (MBA) program.

== Career ==
Eke appeared as a vixen in the music video for Davido and Ichaba's single "Baby Mama". She also appeared in the music video for Airboy's song "Nawo Nawo". Eke auditioned for Big Brother Naija four times before becoming a contestant. Eke entered the Big Brother Naija house on 30 June 2019 and was announced as the winner, becoming the first woman to win the show.

After winning season 4 of Big Brother Naija, Eke became an ambassador and influencer for various organizations. In 2020, she made her acting debut in the Nollywood film Fate of Alakada. Eke has also appeared in short comedy skits alongside a few Nigerian comedians. She emerged as the first runner-up on Big Brother Naija All Stars in July 2023. Eke played the role of Jackie in Netflix series Shanty Town.

=== Business ventures ===
Eke signed endorsement deals and became a brand ambassador for multiple brands, including Ciroc and Mr.Taxi. She also launched her own clothing line, MNM Luxury. In 2020, Eke founded Lambo Homes, a real estate company.

== Filmography ==
=== Television ===
Television
Year	Reality Show	Role	Notes
2019	Big Brother Naija Season 4	Contestant	Winner
2023	Big Brother Naija All Stars Season 8	Contestant	1st Runner-up

=== Film ===
Year	Film	Role
2020	Fate of Alakada	Herself
2023	Shanty Town	Jackie

=== Music videos ===
Year	Title	Artist	Ref.
2017	"Baby Mama"	Ichaba featuring Davido	
2017	"Nawo Nawo Song"	Airboy	
2019	"Ije Ego"	MC Galaxy	
2020	"Take It"	Rudeboy	

== Awards and nominations ==
Year	Association	Category	Nominated works	Result	Ref
2019	Scream Awards	Celebrity Sensation of the year	Herself	Won	
2020	AMVCA	Best Dressed female	Herself	Won	
2020	Net Honours	Most Popular Couple	Herself	Won	
2021	Net Honours	Most Popular Person	Herself	Nominated	
2022	Consumers Choice Awards Africa	Special Award	Herself	Won	
2023	African Entertainment Awards USA	Reality TV Star of the Year	Herself	Won	
