= Ebuka Obi-Uchendu =

Nigerian media personality (born 1982)

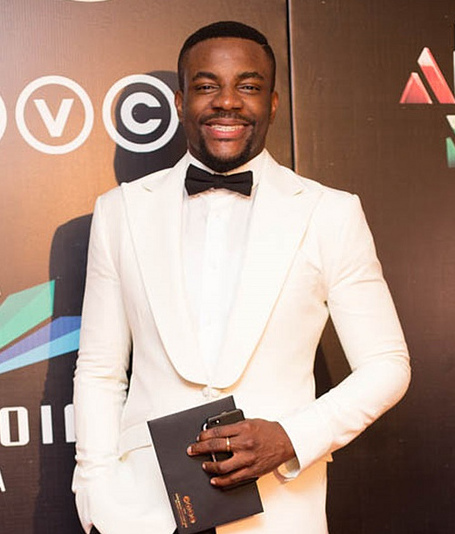
- Ebuka at the 2014 Africa Magic Viewers Choice Awards
- Born: Chukwuebuka Obi-Uchendu; 14 July 1982 (age 44); Benin City, Edo, Nigeria
- Education: University of Abuja; American University
- Occupations: Lawyer; media personality
- Years active: 2006–present
- Spouse: Cynthia Obianodo (m. 2016)
- Children: 2

Chukwuebuka Obi-Uchendu (//; born 14 July 1982) is a Nigerian media personality. He is known for hosting the reality show Big Brother Naija (also known as BBNaija), the talk show Rubbin' Minds on Channels TV as well as co-hosting The Spot and Men's Corner on Ebonylife television. He is an ambassador for Budweiser Nigeria, Samsung Nigeria, and 2Sure Nigeria.

Obi-Uchendu has received several award nominations and won the award for Outstanding TV Presenter of the Year at the Nigerian Broadcasters Merit Awards for his work on Rubbin' Minds.

== Early life ==
Born in Benin City, Edo State in south-south Nigeria, to a banker father and a mother who is a nurse, he is the third of four children with an elder sister as well as one older brother, and a younger brother. He received his nursery and primary education in Benin City, and passed the Common Entrance Examination into secondary school from Primary Four. He later moved with his family to Abuja, the Federal Capital Territory.

== Education ==
He had his secondary education at Christ The King College Abuja, graduating in 1997, before getting his university education at the University of Abuja, up until 2004. He proceeded to the Nigerian Law School Bwari, Abuja finishing in 2005. He then returned to school after a five-year working gap, graduating in December 2010 from the Washington College of Law of the American University Washington D.C., with Master of Laws degree specializations in intellectual property as well as communications law from the Law and Government program.

== Career ==
=== Big Brother and beyond ===
In 2006, he went in as one of an eventual 14 housemates on the first season of the reality show Big Brother Nigeria, finishing in eighth place. He is regarded as one of the most successful contestants from the 2006 season. In January 2017, he was announced as the host of the second season of Big Brother Naija as well as the third season.

After the reality show in 2006, he signed endorsement deals with a telecommunications company and a brewing company and subsequently hosted Friend or Foe on NTA, the GLO Show, also on NTA, and Guinness' Greatness TV. He also maintained a weekly column, "Contrast", in the Nigerian national daily newspaper This Day. He has written for other publications including What's New and Ace magazines.

In the run-up to the 2011 general elections in Nigeria, he hosted the first presidential debate focused on youth issues, which was broadcast live across Nigeria. He also works as a freelance master of ceremonies (MC) for events.

=== Rubbin Minds and EbonyLife TV ===
In 2013, producers of Rubbin' Minds, a Nigerian television talk-show, announced that Obi-Uchendu would become the host.

In 2013, Obi-Uchendu became one of the co-hosts of The Spot, a TV show on DStv, alongside Lamide Akintobi and Zainab Balogun.

In July 2016, he became the host of Men's Corner, Nigeria's first all male TV talk show.

Ahead of the Big Brother Naija Season 5 reunion, some fans called for Obi-Uchendu to step down as host, while others, including several celebrities, defended his performance.

== Personal life ==
Obi-Uchendu is committed to social causes and community engagement. He volunteers with organisations such as Enough is Enough Nigeria, and uses his platform to advocate for human rights, social justice, and youth empowerment.

On 15 April 2015, Obi-Uchendu became engaged to Cynthia Obianodo in Lagos State. They married on 6 February 2016 in Abuja. Their first daughter was born on 8 November 2016, and in 2018, they announced they were expecting another child via Instagram. Cynthia has said she met her husband on Twitter.

== Filmography ==
Title	Type	Date	Role	Notes
Big Brother Nigeria	Reality TV series	2006	Himself	Finished eighth out of 14

== Awards and recognition ==
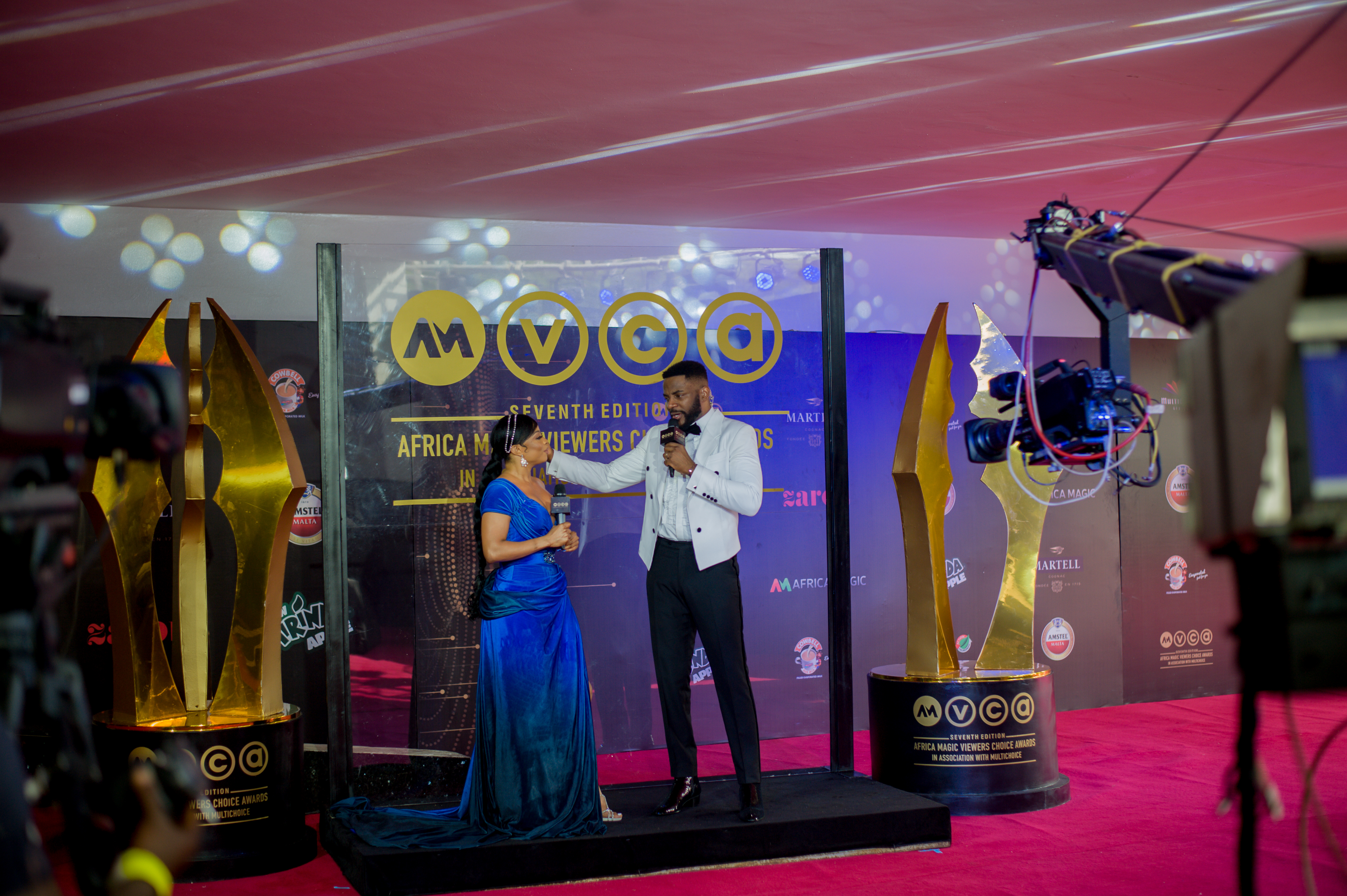
Ebuka and Toke Makinwa presenting at the 2020 AMVCA

Year	Award	Category	Result	Ref
2007	The Future Awards	On-Air Personality	Nominated	
2008	The Future Awards	On-Air Personality	Nominated	
2013	Nigerian Broadcaster's Merit Awards	Outstanding TV Presenter of the Year (Male)	Nominated	
2014	Nigerian Broadcaster's Merit Awards	Outstanding TV Presenter of the Year (Male)	Nominated	
2015	Nigerian Broadcaster's Merit Awards	Outstanding TV Presenter of the Year (Male)	Won	
2021	Net Honours	Most Popular Media Personality (Male)	Won	

== See also ==
- List of Igbo people
- List of Nigerian media personalities
