= 2025 FIFA Club World Cup =

International soccer tournament held in 2025

FIFA Club World Cup 25; FIFA Club World Cup 2025; Coupe du Monde des Clubs de la FIFA 2025; Mundial de Clubes FIFA 2025
- Take it to the World

Tournament details
- Host country: United States
- Dates: June 14 – July 13
- Teams: 32 (from 6 confederations)
- Venues: 12 (in 11 host cities)

Final positions
- Champions: (England) Chelsea (2nd title)
- Runners-up: (France) Paris Saint-Germain

Tournament statistics
- Matches played: 63
- Goals scored: 195 (3.1 per match)
- Attendance: 2,491,462 (39,547 per match)
- Top scorer(s): Ángel Di María (Benfica); Gonzalo García (Real Madrid); Serhou Guirassy (Borussia Dortmund); Marcos Leonardo (Al Hilal); 4 goals each
- Best player: Cole Palmer (Chelsea)
- Best young player: Désiré Doué (Paris Saint-Germain)
- Best goalkeeper: Robert Sánchez (Chelsea)
- Fair play award: (Germany) Bayern Munich

The 2025 FIFA Club World Cup, also marketed as FIFA Club World Cup 25, was the 21st edition of the FIFA Club World Cup, an international club soccer competition organized by FIFA. This was also the first edition under the new expanded format. The tournament was held in the United States from June 14 to July 13, 2025, and featured 32 teams. The expanded format included the continental champions from the past four years as well as additional qualified teams. Chelsea won the tournament, defeating Paris Saint-Germain 3–0 in the final and becoming the inaugural world champions under the expanded format.

The revised structure was modeled more closely on the FIFA World Cup as a quadrennial world championship, replacing the annual seven-team format used between 2000 and 2023. It featured the winners of each continent's top club competition from 2021 to 2024, except for a single entry from Oceania. Additional slots were awarded to clubs from Europe and South America based on rankings across the same four-year period. Manchester City, who won the final edition under the previous format in 2023, entered as the technical title holders but were eliminated in the round of 16 by Al Hilal.

FIFA first announced the expanded format in March 2019, originally selecting China to host the inaugural edition in 2021. This was later postponed due to the global COVID-19 pandemic. In February 2023, FIFA confirmed the allocation of qualification slots among confederations, and four months later announced the United States as the new host nation. Alongside this expansion, FIFA also introduced the FIFA Intercontinental Cup, an annual tournament based on the previous Club World Cup format.

The expansion of the tournament drew varied responses, with some concerns raised by the players' union FIFPRO and the World Leagues Forum regarding potential effects on fixture schedules and player welfare. Ticket sales were managed using dynamic pricing, which was later adjusted for several matches to boost attendance. International broadcasting rights were secured by streaming service DAZN, which sublicensed coverage to other networks. A total of $1 billion in prize money was distributed among the 32 clubs, including solidarity payments and allocations by confederation.

It was the first major FIFA tournament since the 1978 FIFA World Cup not to feature a penalty shootout, and alongside the 2025 CONCACAF Gold Cup, was used as trial preparation for the 2026 FIFA World Cup.

== Background and format ==
Since its return from hiatus in 2005, the FIFA Club World Cup had been held annually in December and was limited to the winners of continental club competitions. As early as late 2016, FIFA president Gianni Infantino suggested expanding the Club World Cup to 32 teams beginning in 2019 and rescheduling it to June/July to be more balanced and attractive to broadcasters and sponsors. In late 2017, FIFA discussed proposals to expand the competition to 24 teams and have it be played every four years starting in 2021, replacing the FIFA Confederations Cup. The expanded format and schedule of Club World Cup, to be played in June and July 2021, was confirmed at the March 2019 FIFA Council meeting in Miami. China was appointed as host in October 2019, but the 2021 event was canceled due to the COVID-19 pandemic.

On June 23, 2023, FIFA confirmed that the United States would host the 2025 tournament as a prelude to the 2026 FIFA World Cup. The 32 teams were divided into eight groups of four teams, with the top two teams in each group qualifying to the knockout stage. However, the only difference from the format used in the FIFA World Cup between 1998 and 2022 was that there was no third place playoff, and that the first tiebreaker between teams tied on points was head to head results.

In January 2024, it was reported that the tournament would mainly take place on the East Coast to be closer to European broadcasters and viewers while also avoiding conflicts with the 2025 CONCACAF Gold Cup, which also took place primarily in the United States around the same time, but mainly in the Western part of the country.

=== Trophy ===
FIFA unveiled a newly designed trophy created by Tiffany & Co. for the 2025 FIFA Club World Cup. Made from pure 24-karat gold, the trophy's design drew inspiration from pioneering maps, the periodic table, astronomy, and the Voyager Golden Record. It featured laser-engraved details including a world map, the names of all 211 FIFA member associations, descriptions of football, and inscriptions in 13 languages, including braille. The trophy weighs approximately 5 kilograms (11 lb) and is valued between €200,000 or US$230,000. The original trophy was kept by United States president Donald Trump in the Oval Office, while an identical replica was awarded to Chelsea, the first winners of the expanded tournament.

== Slot allocation ==
Location of the non-UEFA teams participating in the 2025 FIFA Club World Cup
Location of the UEFA teams participating in the 2025 FIFA Club World Cup

On February 14, 2023, the FIFA Council approved the slot allocation for the 2025 tournament based on a "set of objective metrics and criteria". UEFA was awarded the most slots with twelve, while CONMEBOL was given the second most with six. The AFC, CAF, and CONCACAF were all given four slots, while the OFC and the host association were given one slot each. On March 14, 2023, the FIFA Council approved the key principles of the access list for the tournament. The principles were as follows, considering competitions completed during a four-year period from 2021 to 2024:

- CONMEBOL and UEFA (more than four slots): access for the winners of the confederation's top club competition between 2021 and 2024, with additional teams to be determined by a club ranking of the four-year period.
- AFC, CAF, and CONCACAF (four slots each): access for the winners of the confederation's top club competition between 2021 and 2024. (Note: As the AFC Champions League was shifted from an intra-year schedule to an inter-year schedule starting from 2023–24, only three seasons of the AFC Champions League were completed within the 2021 to 2024 timeframe, resulting in the remaining slot allocated using the four-year club ranking.)
- OFC (one slot): access for the highest-ranked club among the winners of the confederation's top club competition between 2021 and 2024. (Note: As the 2021 OFC Champions League was canceled, the slot was awarded to the best club in the OFC's four-year ranking that won the competition between 2022 and 2024.)
- Host country (one slot): this was determined at a later stage.

If a club won two or more seasons of its confederation's top club competition, additional teams determined club rankings over the four-year period. Furthermore, a restriction of two clubs per association was applied, with the exception of champion clubs if more than two clubs from the same association won their confederation's top club competition. The calculation method for the four-year club rankings within each confederation was based on the teams' performance in their respective continental tournaments during seasons completed between 2021 and 2024.

For confederations other than UEFA, the method was as follows:

- 3 points for a win
- 1 point for a draw
- 3 points for successful progression to each new stage of the competition

In the case of UEFA, due to the existence of the well-established UEFA club coefficient system, the method used by UEFA to calculate the club coefficient was "exceptionally applied" to rank the European teams. (Note: However, the system was only applied over the four years, instead of the usual five, to the Champions League exclusively.)

== Teams ==
=== Qualification ===
The following teams qualified for the tournament:

AFC (4)

- (Japan) Urawa Red Diamonds
- (Saudi Arabia) Al Hilal
- (South Korea) Ulsan HD
- (United Arab Emirates) Al Ain

CAF (4)

- (Egypt) Al Ahly
- (Morocco) Wydad
- (Tunisia) Espérance de Tunis
- (South Africa) Mamelodi Sundowns

CONCACAF (5)

- (Mexico) Monterrey
- (Mexico) Pachuca
- (United States) Inter Miami (hosts, debut)
- (United States) Los Angeles FC (debut) (Note: Club León originally qualified for the tournament as the winners of the 2023 CONCACAF Champions League, but on March 21, 2025, they were excluded from the competition due to violating the FIFA Appeal Committee's rules on multi-club ownership, as León and Pachuca have the same owner. On May 6, 2025, the Court of Arbitration for Sport rejected appeals by León, Pachuca, and Alajuelense. Accordingly, FIFA confirmed León's exclusion and that the winners of a play-in match between Los Angeles FC and América would qualify for the Club World Cup in León's place. On May 31, Los Angeles FC beat América 2–1 in extra time to qualify for the tournament.)
- (United States) Seattle Sounders FC

CONMEBOL (6)

- (Argentina) Boca Juniors
- (Argentina) River Plate
- (Brazil) Botafogo (debut)
- (Brazil) Flamengo
- (Brazil) Fluminense
- (Brazil) Palmeiras

OFC (1)

- (New Zealand) Auckland City

UEFA (12)

- (Austria) Red Bull Salzburg (debut)
- (England) Chelsea
- (England) Manchester City
- (Italy) Inter Milan
- (Italy) Juventus (debut)
- (France) Paris Saint-Germain (debut)
- (Germany) Bayern Munich
- (Germany) Borussia Dortmund (debut)
- (Portugal) Benfica (debut)
- (Portugal) Porto (debut)
- (Spain) Atlético Madrid (debut)
- (Spain) Real Madrid

=== Draw ===
The draw was held on December 5, 2024, 1:00 p.m. EST, at the headquarters of television broadcaster Telemundo in the Miami suburb of Doral, Florida. The ceremony was led by Alessandro Del Piero at the Telemundo headquarters. FIFA announced the draw procedure and seeding pots two days prior to the draw, taking into consideration sporting and geographical factors as far as possible.

FIFA compiled the draw pots as follows, with teams ranked within each confederation based on FIFA's club ranking system:

- Pot 1: The four top-ranked teams from both UEFA and CONMEBOL
- Pot 2: The remaining eight teams from UEFA
- Pot 3: The two top-ranked teams from each of AFC, CAF and CONCACAF, and the remaining two teams from CONMEBOL
- Pot 4: The remaining teams from AFC, CAF, CONCACAF, OFC and host country

In the draw, teams from the same confederation could not be drawn into the same group except for UEFA teams, for which there was at least one and no more than two per group. Additionally, teams from the same national association could be drawn into the same group.

To maintain competitive balance, two separate pathways of four groups were established for the knockout stage. They were composed as follows:

- Pathway 1: Winners of Groups A, C, E, and G, paired with the runners-up of Groups B, D, F, and H
- Pathway 2: Winners of Groups B, D, F, and H, paired with the runners-up of Groups A, C, E, and G

Given these pathways, UEFA and CONMEBOL teams faced the following constraints in the draw:

- UEFA teams ranked 1–2, and CONMEBOL teams ranked 1–2 were allocated to separate pathways, prevented from meeting until the semifinals should they finish in the same relative position in the top two of their respective groups
- UEFA teams ranked 3–4, and CONMEBOL teams ranked 3–4, were allocated to separate pathways, prevented from meeting until the semifinals should they finish in the same relative position in the top two of their respective groups
- UEFA teams ranked 1–4 were drawn into groups that would prevent them from meeting until the semifinals, should they finish in the same relative position in the top two of their respective groups, not necessarily win them.
- CONMEBOL teams ranked 1–4 were drawn into groups that would prevent them from meeting until the semifinals, should they finish in the same relative position in the top two of their respective groups, not necessarily win them.
- UEFA teams ranked 5–8 were drawn into groups with CONMEBOL teams ranked 1–4
- UEFA teams ranked 9–12 were drawn into groups with UEFA teams ranked 1–4

As teams from the host country and for scheduling purposes, Inter Miami and the Seattle Sounders were drawn into position 4 of Groups A and B, respectively. Consequently, teams drawn into Groups A and B were allocated to the position corresponding to their draw pot.

The draw started with Pot 1 and ended with Pot 4, with each team selected then allocated into the first available group alphabetically, based on the draw constraints. For Groups C to H, the position for the team within the group was then drawn (for the purpose of the match schedule), with the Pot 1 teams automatically drawn into position 1 of each group.

The draw pots were as follows:

Pot 1
Team	Confed.	Pts
(England) Manchester City	UEFA	123
(Spain) Real Madrid	UEFA	119
(Germany) Bayern Munich	UEFA	108
(France) Paris Saint-Germain	UEFA	85
(Brazil) Flamengo	CONMEBOL	141
(Brazil) Palmeiras	CONMEBOL	140
(Argentina) River Plate	CONMEBOL	103
(Brazil) Fluminense	CONMEBOL	97

Pot 3
Team	Confed.	Pts
(Saudi Arabia) Al Hilal	AFC	118
(South Korea) Ulsan HD	AFC	81
(Egypt) Al Ahly	CAF	140
(Morocco) Wydad	CAF	108
(Mexico) Monterrey	CONCACAF	52
~~(Mexico) León~~	CONCACAF	47
(Argentina) Boca Juniors	CONMEBOL	71
(Brazil) Botafogo	CONMEBOL	37

Pot 2
Team	Confed.	Pts
(England) Chelsea	UEFA	79
(Germany) Borussia Dortmund	UEFA	79
(Italy) Inter Milan	UEFA	76
(Portugal) Porto	UEFA	68
(Spain) Atlético Madrid	UEFA	67
(Portugal) Benfica	UEFA	52
(Italy) Juventus	UEFA	47
(Austria) Red Bull Salzburg	UEFA	40

Pot 4
Team	Confed.	Pts
(Japan) Urawa Red Diamonds	AFC	49
(United Arab Emirates) Al Ain	AFC	43
(Tunisia) Espérance de Tunis	CAF	100
(South Africa) Mamelodi Sundowns	CAF	98
(Mexico) Pachuca	CONCACAF	34
(United States) Seattle Sounders	CONCACAF	28
(New Zealand) Auckland City	OFC	66
(United States) Inter Miami	Host	—N/a

=== Groups ===
Group A
Pos	Team
A1	(Brazil) Palmeiras
A2	(Portugal) Porto
A3	(Egypt) Al Ahly
A4	(United States) Inter Miami

Group E
Pos	Team
E1	(Argentina) River Plate
E2	(Japan) Urawa Red Diamonds
E3	(Mexico) Monterrey
E4	(Italy) Inter Milan

Group B
Pos	Team
B1	(France) Paris Saint-Germain
B2	(Spain) Atlético Madrid
B3	(Brazil) Botafogo
B4	(United States) Seattle Sounders

Group F
Pos	Team
F1	(Brazil) Fluminense
F2	(Germany) Borussia Dortmund
F3	(South Korea) Ulsan HD
F4	(South Africa) Mamelodi Sundowns

Group C
Pos	Team
C1	(Germany) Bayern Munich
C2	(New Zealand) Auckland City
C3	(Argentina) Boca Juniors
C4	(Portugal) Benfica

Group G
Pos	Team
G1	(England) Manchester City
G2	(Morocco) Wydad
G3	(United Arab Emirates) Al Ain
G4	(Italy) Juventus

Group D
Pos	Team
D1	(Brazil) Flamengo
D2	(Tunisia) Espérance de Tunis
D3	(England) Chelsea
D4	(United States) Los Angeles FC

Group H
Pos	Team
H1	(Spain) Real Madrid
H2	(Saudi Arabia) Al Hilal
H3	(Mexico) Pachuca
H4	(Austria) Red Bull Salzburg

== Venues ==
On September 28, 2024, FIFA announced the selection of twelve venues in eleven cities for the tournament: Lincoln Financial Field in Philadelphia, Pennsylvania; Audi Field in Washington D.C.; Lumen Field in Seattle, Washington; the Rose Bowl in Pasadena, California; TQL Stadium in Cincinnati, Ohio; Bank of America Stadium in Charlotte, North Carolina; Mercedes-Benz Stadium in Atlanta, Georgia; Hard Rock Stadium in Miami Gardens, Florida, which hosted the opening match involving Inter Miami; Geodis Park in Nashville, Tennessee; Camping World Stadium and Inter&Co Stadium in Orlando, Florida; and MetLife Stadium in East Rutherford, New Jersey, which hosted the final. Lumen Field hosted all three group stage matches for the Seattle Sounders. Of these selected stadiums, five were used in the following summer's World Cup. Unlike other FIFA tournaments, including the 2026 FIFA World Cup, all venues kept their original naming rights.

List of host cities and stadiums
Pasadena (Los Angeles Area)	East Rutherford (New York City Area)	Charlotte	Atlanta
Rose Bowl	MetLife Stadium	Bank of America Stadium	Mercedes-Benz Stadium
Capacity: 89,702	Capacity: 82,500	Capacity: 74,867	Capacity: 71,000
Seattle	Location of the host cities of the 2025 FIFA Club World Cup.: 1 Atlanta; 2 Charlotte; 3 Cincinnati; 4 East Rutherford; 5 Miami Gardens; 6 Nashville; 7 Orlando; 8 Pasadena; 9 Philadelphia; 10 Seattle; 11 Washington D.C.		Philadelphia
Lumen Field	Location of the host cities of the 2025 FIFA Club World Cup.: 1 Atlanta; 2 Charlotte; 3 Cincinnati; 4 East Rutherford; 5 Miami Gardens; 6 Nashville; 7 Orlando; 8 Pasadena; 9 Philadelphia; 10 Seattle; 11 Washington D.C.		Lincoln Financial Field
Capacity: 68,740	Location of the host cities of the 2025 FIFA Club World Cup.: 1 Atlanta; 2 Charlotte; 3 Cincinnati; 4 East Rutherford; 5 Miami Gardens; 6 Nashville; 7 Orlando; 8 Pasadena; 9 Philadelphia; 10 Seattle; 11 Washington D.C.		Capacity: 67,594
Miami Gardens (Miami Area)	Location of the host cities of the 2025 FIFA Club World Cup.: 1 Atlanta; 2 Charlotte; 3 Cincinnati; 4 East Rutherford; 5 Miami Gardens; 6 Nashville; 7 Orlando; 8 Pasadena; 9 Philadelphia; 10 Seattle; 11 Washington D.C.		Nashville
Hard Rock Stadium	Location of the host cities of the 2025 FIFA Club World Cup.: 1 Atlanta; 2 Charlotte; 3 Cincinnati; 4 East Rutherford; 5 Miami Gardens; 6 Nashville; 7 Orlando; 8 Pasadena; 9 Philadelphia; 10 Seattle; 11 Washington D.C.		Geodis Park
Capacity: 64,767	Location of the host cities of the 2025 FIFA Club World Cup.: 1 Atlanta; 2 Charlotte; 3 Cincinnati; 4 East Rutherford; 5 Miami Gardens; 6 Nashville; 7 Orlando; 8 Pasadena; 9 Philadelphia; 10 Seattle; 11 Washington D.C.		Capacity: 30,109
Orlando		Cincinnati	Washington D.C.
Camping World Stadium	Inter&Co Stadium	TQL Stadium	Audi Field
Capacity: 60,219	Capacity: 25,500	Capacity: 26,000	Capacity: 20,000

=== Training bases ===
According to a report from The Athletic, FIFA designated sites in host cities for team training bases, with priority given to clubs that had more matches in the area. Clubs were permitted to independently negotiate with other facility owners and operators, including several college athletic programs, to secure their own base. Several facilities were also designated by FIFA for use later in the tournament by qualified teams in the knockout rounds. The team base camps for the group stage were confirmed by FIFA on June 3, 2025.

Base camp and training ground by team—sortable
Team	Base camp	Training ground
(Egypt) Al Ahly	Davie, Florida	Nova Southeastern University
(Egypt) Al Ahly	Basking Ridge, New Jersey	Pingry School
(United Arab Emirates) Al Ain	Alexandria, Virginia	Episcopal High School
(Saudi Arabia) Al Hilal	Leesburg, Virginia	D.C. United Training Center
(Saudi Arabia) Al Hilal	Nashville, Tennessee	Nashville SC Training Facility
(Spain) Atlético Madrid	Los Angeles, California	Los Angeles Memorial Coliseum
(New Zealand) Auckland City	Chattanooga, Tennessee	Baylor School
(Germany) Bayern Munich	Bay Lake, Florida	ESPN Wide World of Sports Complex
(Portugal) Benfica	Tampa, Florida	Waters Sportsplex
(Argentina) Boca Juniors	Miami Shores, Florida	Barry University
(Germany) Borussia Dortmund	Fort Lauderdale, Florida	Florida Blue Training Center
(Brazil) Botafogo	Santa Barbara, California	Westmont College
(England) Chelsea	Chester, Pennsylvania	Philadelphia Union Training Center
(England) Chelsea	Davie, Florida	Nova Southeastern University
(Tunisia) Espérance de Tunis	Rochester Hills, Michigan (Note: Oakland University has a Rochester mailing address, but the university's soccer complex is within the city limits of Rochester Hills.)	Oakland University
(Brazil) Flamengo	Galloway Township, New Jersey	Stockton University
(Brazil) Flamengo	Bay Lake, Florida	ESPN Wide World of Sports Complex
(Brazil) Fluminense	Columbia, South Carolina	University of South Carolina
(United States) Inter Miami	Fort Lauderdale, Florida	Florida Blue Training Center
(Italy) Inter Milan	Los Angeles, California	University of California, Los Angeles
(Italy) Inter Milan	Renton, Washington	Virginia Mason Athletic Center
(Italy) Juventus	White Sulphur Springs, West Virginia	The Greenbrier
(Italy) Juventus	Orlando, Florida	ChampionsGate
(United States) Los Angeles FC	Macon, Georgia	Mercer University
(South Africa) Mamelodi Sundowns	Bradenton, Florida	IMG Academy
(England) Manchester City	Boca Raton, Florida	Lynn University
(Mexico) Monterrey	Los Angeles, California	Loyola Marymount University
(Mexico) Pachuca	Charlotte, North Carolina	University of North Carolina at Charlotte
(Brazil) Palmeiras	Greensboro, North Carolina	University of North Carolina at Greensboro
(France) Paris Saint-Germain	Irvine, California	University of California, Irvine
(Portugal) Porto	Piscataway, New Jersey	Rutgers University
(Spain) Real Madrid	Palm Beach Gardens, Florida	Gardens North County District Park
(Austria) Red Bull Salzburg	Whippany, New Jersey	Melanie Lane Training Ground
(Argentina) River Plate	Renton, Washington	Providence Swedish Performance Center & Clubhouse
(United States) Seattle Sounders	Renton, Washington	Providence Swedish Performance Center & Clubhouse
(South Korea) Ulsan HD	Charlotte, North Carolina	Charlotte FC Performance Park
(Japan) Urawa Red Diamonds	Portland, Oregon	University of Portland
(Morocco) Wydad	Bethesda, Maryland	Landon School

== Match officials ==
On April 14, 2025, FIFA confirmed that 117 match officials from 41 member associations would be selected for the tournament. This included 35 referees, 58 assistant referees, and 24 video match officials.

Confederation	Referee	Assistant referees	Video assistant referees	Reserve referees
AFC	(Australia) Alireza Faghani	(Australia) Anton Shchetinin (Australia) Ashley Beecham	(Qatar) Khamis Al-Marri (Australia) Shaun Evans (China) Fu Ming (United Arab Emirates) Mohammed Obaid Khadim	(United Arab Emirates) Omar Al Ali (China) Ma Ning
AFC	(Qatar) Salman Falahi	(Qatar) Ramzan Al-Naemi (Qatar) Majid Al-Shammari	(Qatar) Khamis Al-Marri (Australia) Shaun Evans (China) Fu Ming (United Arab Emirates) Mohammed Obaid Khadim	(United Arab Emirates) Omar Al Ali (China) Ma Ning
AFC	(Uzbekistan) Ilgiz Tantashev	(Uzbekistan) Timur Gaynullin (Uzbekistan) Andrey Tsapenko	(Qatar) Khamis Al-Marri (Australia) Shaun Evans (China) Fu Ming (United Arab Emirates) Mohammed Obaid Khadim	(United Arab Emirates) Omar Al Ali (China) Ma Ning
CAF	(Mauritania) Dahane Beida	(Angola) Jerson Emiliano dos Santos (Kenya) Stephen Yiembe	(Morocco) Hamza El Fariq (Egypt) Mahmoud Ashour	(Libya) Mutaz Ibrahim (Democratic Republic of the Congo) Jean-Jacques Ndala
CAF	(Algeria) Mustapha Ghorbal	(Algeria) Mokrane Gourari (Algeria) Abbes Akram Zerhouni	(Morocco) Hamza El Fariq (Egypt) Mahmoud Ashour	(Libya) Mutaz Ibrahim (Democratic Republic of the Congo) Jean-Jacques Ndala
CAF	(Senegal) Issa Sy	(Senegal) Djibril Camara (Senegal) Nouha Bangoura	(Morocco) Hamza El Fariq (Egypt) Mahmoud Ashour	(Libya) Mutaz Ibrahim (Democratic Republic of the Congo) Jean-Jacques Ndala
CONCACAF	(El Salvador) Iván Barton	(El Salvador) David Morán (Nicaragua) Henry Pupiro	(Nicaragua) Tatiana Guzmán (Mexico) Érick Miranda (Mexico) Guillermo Pacheco (United States) Armando Villarreal	
CONCACAF	(Canada) Drew Fischer	(Canada) Lyes Arfa (Canada) Micheal Barwegen	(Nicaragua) Tatiana Guzmán (Mexico) Érick Miranda (Mexico) Guillermo Pacheco (United States) Armando Villarreal	
CONCACAF	(Honduras) Saíd Martínez	(Honduras) Walter López (Honduras) Christian Ramírez	(Nicaragua) Tatiana Guzmán (Mexico) Érick Miranda (Mexico) Guillermo Pacheco (United States) Armando Villarreal	
CONCACAF	(United States) Tori Penso	(United States) Kathryn Nesbitt (United States) Brooke Mayo	(Nicaragua) Tatiana Guzmán (Mexico) Érick Miranda (Mexico) Guillermo Pacheco (United States) Armando Villarreal	
CONCACAF	(Mexico) César Ramos	(Mexico) Alberto Morín (Mexico) Marco Bisguerra	(Nicaragua) Tatiana Guzmán (Mexico) Érick Miranda (Mexico) Guillermo Pacheco (United States) Armando Villarreal	
CONMEBOL	(Brazil) Ramon Abatti	(Brazil) Rafael Alves (Brazil) Danilo Manis	(Colombia) Nicolás Gallo (Uruguay) Leodán González (Chile) Juan Lara (Argentina) Hernán Mastrángelo (Venezuela) Juan Soto	(Uruguay) Gustavo Tejera
CONMEBOL	(Paraguay) Juan Gabriel Benítez	(Paraguay) Eduardo Cardozo (Paraguay) Milcíades Saldívar	(Colombia) Nicolás Gallo (Uruguay) Leodán González (Chile) Juan Lara (Argentina) Hernán Mastrángelo (Venezuela) Juan Soto	(Uruguay) Gustavo Tejera
CONMEBOL	(Argentina) Yael Falcón	(Argentina) Facundo Rodríguez (Argentina) Maximiliano Del Yesso	(Colombia) Nicolás Gallo (Uruguay) Leodán González (Chile) Juan Lara (Argentina) Hernán Mastrángelo (Venezuela) Juan Soto	(Uruguay) Gustavo Tejera
CONMEBOL	(Chile) Cristián Garay	(Chile) José Retamal (Chile) Miguel Rocha	(Colombia) Nicolás Gallo (Uruguay) Leodán González (Chile) Juan Lara (Argentina) Hernán Mastrángelo (Venezuela) Juan Soto	(Uruguay) Gustavo Tejera
CONMEBOL	(Brazil) Wilton Sampaio	(Brazil) Bruno Boschilia (Brazil) Bruno Pires	(Colombia) Nicolás Gallo (Uruguay) Leodán González (Chile) Juan Lara (Argentina) Hernán Mastrángelo (Venezuela) Juan Soto	(Uruguay) Gustavo Tejera
CONMEBOL	(Argentina) Facundo Tello	(Argentina) Juan Pablo Belatti (Argentina) Gabriel Chade	(Colombia) Nicolás Gallo (Uruguay) Leodán González (Chile) Juan Lara (Argentina) Hernán Mastrángelo (Venezuela) Juan Soto	(Uruguay) Gustavo Tejera
CONMEBOL	(Venezuela) Jesús Valenzuela	(Venezuela) Jorge Urrego (Venezuela) Tulio Moreno	(Colombia) Nicolás Gallo (Uruguay) Leodán González (Chile) Juan Lara (Argentina) Hernán Mastrángelo (Venezuela) Juan Soto	(Uruguay) Gustavo Tejera
OFC				(New Zealand) Campbell-Kirk Kawana-Waugh
UEFA	(Norway) Espen Eskås	(Norway) Jan Erik Engan (Norway) Isaak Bashevkin	(Croatia) Ivan Bebek (France) Jérôme Brisard (Germany) Bastian Dankert (Spain) Carlos del Cerro Grande (Italy) Marco Di Bello (Netherlands) Rob Dieperink (Spain) Alejandro Hernández Hernández (Poland) Tomasz Kwiatkowski (Belgium) Bram Van Driessche	
UEFA	(Romania) István Kovács	(Romania) Mihai Marius Marica (Romania) Ferencz Tunyogi	(Croatia) Ivan Bebek (France) Jérôme Brisard (Germany) Bastian Dankert (Spain) Carlos del Cerro Grande (Italy) Marco Di Bello (Netherlands) Rob Dieperink (Spain) Alejandro Hernández Hernández (Poland) Tomasz Kwiatkowski (Belgium) Bram Van Driessche	
UEFA	(France) François Letexier	(France) Cyril Mugnier (France) Mehdi Rahmouni	(Croatia) Ivan Bebek (France) Jérôme Brisard (Germany) Bastian Dankert (Spain) Carlos del Cerro Grande (Italy) Marco Di Bello (Netherlands) Rob Dieperink (Spain) Alejandro Hernández Hernández (Poland) Tomasz Kwiatkowski (Belgium) Bram Van Driessche	
UEFA	(Netherlands) Danny Makkelie	(Netherlands) Hessel Steegstra (Netherlands) Jan de Vries	(Croatia) Ivan Bebek (France) Jérôme Brisard (Germany) Bastian Dankert (Spain) Carlos del Cerro Grande (Italy) Marco Di Bello (Netherlands) Rob Dieperink (Spain) Alejandro Hernández Hernández (Poland) Tomasz Kwiatkowski (Belgium) Bram Van Driessche	
UEFA	(Poland) Szymon Marciniak	(Poland) Tomasz Listkiewicz (Poland) Adam Kupsik	(Croatia) Ivan Bebek (France) Jérôme Brisard (Germany) Bastian Dankert (Spain) Carlos del Cerro Grande (Italy) Marco Di Bello (Netherlands) Rob Dieperink (Spain) Alejandro Hernández Hernández (Poland) Tomasz Kwiatkowski (Belgium) Bram Van Driessche	
UEFA	(Sweden) Glenn Nyberg	(Sweden) Mahbod Beigi (Sweden) Andreas Söderkvist	(Croatia) Ivan Bebek (France) Jérôme Brisard (Germany) Bastian Dankert (Spain) Carlos del Cerro Grande (Italy) Marco Di Bello (Netherlands) Rob Dieperink (Spain) Alejandro Hernández Hernández (Poland) Tomasz Kwiatkowski (Belgium) Bram Van Driessche	
UEFA	(England) Michael Oliver	(England) Stuart Burt (England) James Mainwaring	(Croatia) Ivan Bebek (France) Jérôme Brisard (Germany) Bastian Dankert (Spain) Carlos del Cerro Grande (Italy) Marco Di Bello (Netherlands) Rob Dieperink (Spain) Alejandro Hernández Hernández (Poland) Tomasz Kwiatkowski (Belgium) Bram Van Driessche	
UEFA	(England) Anthony Taylor	(England) Gary Beswick (England) Adam Nunn	(Croatia) Ivan Bebek (France) Jérôme Brisard (Germany) Bastian Dankert (Spain) Carlos del Cerro Grande (Italy) Marco Di Bello (Netherlands) Rob Dieperink (Spain) Alejandro Hernández Hernández (Poland) Tomasz Kwiatkowski (Belgium) Bram Van Driessche	
UEFA	(France) Clément Turpin	(France) Nicolas Danos (France) Benjamin Pagès	(Croatia) Ivan Bebek (France) Jérôme Brisard (Germany) Bastian Dankert (Spain) Carlos del Cerro Grande (Italy) Marco Di Bello (Netherlands) Rob Dieperink (Spain) Alejandro Hernández Hernández (Poland) Tomasz Kwiatkowski (Belgium) Bram Van Driessche	
UEFA	(Slovenia) Slavko Vinčić	(Slovenia) Tomaž Klančnik (Slovenia) Andraž Kovačič	(Croatia) Ivan Bebek (France) Jérôme Brisard (Germany) Bastian Dankert (Spain) Carlos del Cerro Grande (Italy) Marco Di Bello (Netherlands) Rob Dieperink (Spain) Alejandro Hernández Hernández (Poland) Tomasz Kwiatkowski (Belgium) Bram Van Driessche	
UEFA	(Germany) Felix Zwayer	(Germany) Robert Kempter (Germany) Christian Dietz	(Croatia) Ivan Bebek (France) Jérôme Brisard (Germany) Bastian Dankert (Spain) Carlos del Cerro Grande (Italy) Marco Di Bello (Netherlands) Rob Dieperink (Spain) Alejandro Hernández Hernández (Poland) Tomasz Kwiatkowski (Belgium) Bram Van Driessche	

== Schedule ==
On December 17, 2023, FIFA announced the tournament would take place from June 15 to July 13, 2025. Prior to the draw, only the date and venue of the opening match (involving Inter Miami) and final was confirmed, along with the venue for the group stage matches of the Seattle Sounders. The full match schedule with venues and kickoff times was finalized and published on December 7, 2024, following the draw. The start date of the tournament was altered, with the tournament beginning one day earlier on June 14. The schedule was created taking into account factors such as "sporting and player-centric criteria, local and traveling fans and global broadcast considerations".

== Squads ==
Each club was required to name a provisional squad of between 26 and 50 players for the tournament. From June 1 to 10, 2025, the member associations of all participating clubs implemented an extraordinary transfer window to allow for the registration of newly signed players. Clubs were required to name their final squads of between 26 and 35 players, including at least three goalkeepers, by June 10. During the competition, clubs could make limited changes to their final lists from June 27 to July 3, should the club's member association have a transfer window open during this period, though no player could appear for two clubs during the tournament. Should a club's goalkeeper have suffered from an injury or illness, that player could be replaced at any time.

== Opening ceremony ==
French Montana and Swae Lee headlined the opening ceremony, which took place at Miami's Hard Rock Stadium before the opening match between Al Ahly and Inter Miami. Singers Vikina and Richaelio also performed during the ceremony, which was broadcast on DAZN.

== Group stage ==
In the group stage, teams were divided into eight groups of four (groups A to H). Teams in each group played one another in a round-robin, from which the top two teams advanced to the knockout stage.

Tie-breaking criteria for group play
The ranking of teams in each group was determined by the points obtained in all group matches. If two or more teams were equal on points the ranking was as follows:
1. Points obtained in the matches played between the teams in question;
2. Goal difference in the matches played between the teams in question;
3. Number of goals scored in the matches played between the teams in question;

If, after having applied criteria a. to c., teams still had an equal ranking, (Note: For example if criteria a. to c. were applied to three teams that were level on points initially, and these criteria separated one team from the other two who still had an equal ranking.) criteria a. to c. were reapplied exclusively to the matches between the teams who were still level to determine their final rankings. If this procedure did not lead to a decision, criteria d. to g. applied.

4. Goal difference in all group matches;
5. Number of goals scored in all group matches;
6. Team conduct ("fair play") points in all group matches (only one deduction could be applied to a player or coach in a single match):
  - Yellow card: −1 points;
  - Indirect red card (second yellow card): −3 points;
  - Direct red card: −4 points;
  - Yellow card and direct red card: −5 points;
7. Drawing of lots.

=== Group A ===
Pos	Team	Pld	W	D	L	GF	GA	GD	Pts	Qualification
1	(Brazil) Palmeiras	3	1	2	0	4	2	+2	5 (Note: Tied on head-to-head result (Inter Miami CF 2–2 Palmeiras). Overall goal difference was used as the tiebreaker.)	Advance to knockout stage
2	(United States) Inter Miami CF	3	1	2	0	4	3	+1	5	Advance to knockout stage
3	(Portugal) Porto	3	0	2	1	5	6	−1	2 (Note: Tied on head-to-head result (Porto 4–4 Al Ahly). Overall goal difference was used as the tiebreaker.)	
4	(Egypt) Al Ahly	3	0	2	1	4	6	−2	2	

Source: FIFA
Notes:
June 14, 2025
8:00 pm EDT

Al Ahly (Egypt)	0–0	(United States) Inter Miami CF
	Report

Hard Rock Stadium, Miami Gardens
Attendance: 60,927
Referee: Alireza Faghani (Australia)
June 15, 2025
6:00 pm EDT

Palmeiras (Brazil)	0–0	(Portugal) Porto
	Report

MetLife Stadium, East Rutherford
Attendance: 46,275
Referee: Saíd Martínez (Honduras)

June 19, 2025
12:00 pm EDT

Palmeiras (Brazil)	2–0	(Egypt) Al Ahly
Abou Ali 49' (o.g.); López 59'	Report

MetLife Stadium, East Rutherford
Attendance: 35,179
Referee: Anthony Taylor (England)
June 19, 2025
3:00 pm EDT

Inter Miami CF (United States)	2–1	(Portugal) Porto
Segovia 47'; Messi 54'	Report	Aghehowa 8' (pen.)

Mercedes-Benz Stadium, Atlanta
Attendance: 31,783
Referee: Cristián Garay (Chile)

June 23, 2025
9:00 pm EDT

Inter Miami CF (United States)	2–2	(Brazil) Palmeiras
Allende 16'; Suárez 65'	Report	Paulinho 80'; Maurício 87'

Hard Rock Stadium, Miami Gardens
Attendance: 60,914
Referee: Szymon Marciniak (Poland)
June 23, 2025
9:00 pm EDT

Porto (Portugal)	4–4	(Egypt) Al Ahly
Mora 23'; William Gomes 50'; Aghehowa 53'; Pepê 89'	Report	Abou Ali 15', 45+2' (pen.), 51'; Ben Romdhane 64'

MetLife Stadium, East Rutherford
Attendance: 39,893
Referee: Jesús Valenzuela (Venezuela)

=== Group B ===
Pos	Team	Pld	W	D	L	GF	GA	GD	Pts	Qualification
1	(France) Paris Saint-Germain	3	2	0	1	6	1	+5	6 (Note: Tied on head-to-head points (3). Head-to-head goal difference: Paris Saint-Germain +3, Botafogo 0, Atlético Madrid –3.)	Advance to knockout stage
2	(Brazil) Botafogo	3	2	0	1	3	2	+1	6	Advance to knockout stage
3	(Spain) Atlético Madrid	3	2	0	1	4	5	−1	6	
4	(United States) Seattle Sounders FC	3	0	0	3	2	7	−5	0	

Source: FIFA
Notes:
June 15, 2025
12:00 pm PDT

Paris Saint-Germain (France)	4–0	(Spain) Atlético Madrid
Fabián 19'; Vitinha 45+1'; Mayulu 87'; Lee Kang-in 90+7' (pen.)	Report

Rose Bowl, Pasadena
Attendance: 80,619
Referee: István Kovács (Romania)
June 15, 2025
7:00 pm PDT

Botafogo (Brazil)	2–1	(United States) Seattle Sounders FC
Jair Cunha 28'; Igor Jesus 44'	Report	C. Roldan 75'

Lumen Field, Seattle
Attendance: 30,151
Referee: Glenn Nyberg (Sweden)

June 19, 2025
3:00 pm PDT

Seattle Sounders FC (United States)	1–3	(Spain) Atlético Madrid
Rusnák 50'	Report	Barrios 11', 55'; Witsel 47'

Lumen Field, Seattle
Attendance: 51,636
Referee: Yael Falcón (Argentina)
June 19, 2025
6:00 pm PDT

Paris Saint-Germain (France)	0–1	(Brazil) Botafogo
	Report	Igor Jesus 36'

Rose Bowl, Pasadena
Attendance: 53,699
Referee: Drew Fischer (Canada)

June 23, 2025
12:00 pm PDT

Seattle Sounders FC (United States)	0–2	(France) Paris Saint-Germain
	Report	Kvaratskhelia 35'; Hakimi 66'

Lumen Field, Seattle
Attendance: 50,628
Referee: Cristián Garay (Chile)
June 23, 2025
12:00 pm PDT

Atlético Madrid (Spain)	1–0	(Brazil) Botafogo
Griezmann 87'	Report

Rose Bowl, Pasadena
Attendance: 22,992
Referee: César Ramos (Mexico)

=== Group C ===
Pos	Team	Pld	W	D	L	GF	GA	GD	Pts	Qualification
1	(Portugal) Benfica	3	2	1	0	9	2	+7	7	Advance to knockout stage
2	(Germany) Bayern Munich	3	2	0	1	12	2	+10	6	Advance to knockout stage
3	(Argentina) Boca Juniors	3	0	2	1	4	5	−1	2	
4	(New Zealand) Auckland City	3	0	1	2	1	17	−16	1	

Source: FIFA
June 15, 2025
12:00 pm EDT

Bayern Munich (Germany)	10–0	(New Zealand) Auckland City
Coman 6', 21'; Boey 18'; Olise 20', 45+3'; Müller 45', 89'; Musiala 67', 73' (pen.), 84'	Report

TQL Stadium, Cincinnati
Attendance: 21,152
Referee: Issa Sy (Senegal)
June 16, 2025
6:00 pm EDT

Boca Juniors (Argentina)	2–2	(Portugal) Benfica
Otamendi 21' (o.g.); Battaglia 27'	Report	Di María 45+3' (pen.); Otamendi 84'

Hard Rock Stadium, Miami Gardens
Attendance: 55,574
Referee: César Ramos (Mexico)

June 20, 2025
12:00 pm EDT

Benfica (Portugal)	6–0	(New Zealand) Auckland City
Di María 45+8' (pen.), 90+8' (pen.); Pavlidis 53'; Sanches 63'; Barreiro 76', 78'	Report

Inter&Co Stadium, Orlando
Attendance: 6,730
Referee: Salman Falahi (Qatar)
June 20, 2025
9:00 pm EDT

Bayern Munich (Germany)	2–1	(Argentina) Boca Juniors
Kane 18'; Olise 84'	Report	Merentiel 66'

Hard Rock Stadium, Miami Gardens
Attendance: 63,587
Referee: Alireza Faghani (Australia)

June 24, 2025
2:00 pm CDT

Auckland City (New Zealand)	1–1	(Argentina) Boca Juniors
Gray 52'	Report	Garrow 26' (o.g.)

Geodis Park, Nashville
Attendance: 16,899
Referee: Glenn Nyberg (Sweden)
June 24, 2025
3:00 pm EDT

Benfica (Portugal)	1–0	(Germany) Bayern Munich
Schjelderup 13'	Report

Bank of America Stadium, Charlotte
Attendance: 33,287
Referee: François Letexier (France)

=== Group D ===
Pos	Team	Pld	W	D	L	GF	GA	GD	Pts	Qualification
1	(Brazil) Flamengo	3	2	1	0	6	2	+4	7	Advance to knockout stage
2	(England) Chelsea	3	2	0	1	6	3	+3	6	Advance to knockout stage
3	(Tunisia) Espérance de Tunis	3	1	0	2	1	5	−4	3	
4	(United States) Los Angeles FC	3	0	1	2	1	4	−3	1	

Source: FIFA
June 16, 2025
3:00 pm EDT

Chelsea (England)	2–0	(United States) Los Angeles FC
Neto 34'; Fernández 79'	Report

Mercedes-Benz Stadium, Atlanta
Attendance: 22,137
Referee: Jesús Valenzuela (Venezuela)
June 16, 2025
9:00 pm EDT

Flamengo (Brazil)	2–0	(Tunisia) Espérance de Tunis
De Arrascaeta 17'; Luiz Araújo 70'	Report

Lincoln Financial Field, Philadelphia
Attendance: 25,797
Referee: Danny Makkelie (Netherlands)

June 20, 2025
2:00 pm EDT

Flamengo (Brazil)	3–1	(England) Chelsea
Bruno Henrique 62'; Danilo 65'; Wallace Yan 83'	Report	Neto 13'

Lincoln Financial Field, Philadelphia
Attendance: 54,019
Referee: Iván Barton (El Salvador)
June 20, 2025
5:00 pm CDT

Los Angeles FC (United States)	0–1	(Tunisia) Espérance de Tunis
	Report	Belaïli 70'

Geodis Park, Nashville
Attendance: 13,651
Referee: Espen Eskås (Norway)

June 24, 2025
9:00 pm EDT

Los Angeles FC (United States)	1–1	(Brazil) Flamengo
Bouanga 84'	Report	Wallace Yan 86'

Camping World Stadium, Orlando
Attendance: 32,933
Referee: Salman Falahi (Qatar)
June 24, 2025
9:00 pm EDT

Espérance de Tunis (Tunisia)	0–3	(England) Chelsea
	Report	Adarabioyo 45+3'; Delap 45+5'; George 90+7'

Lincoln Financial Field, Philadelphia
Attendance: 32,967
Referee: Yael Falcón (Argentina)

=== Group E ===
Pos	Team	Pld	W	D	L	GF	GA	GD	Pts	Qualification
1	(Italy) Inter Milan	3	2	1	0	5	2	+3	7	Advance to knockout stage
2	(Mexico) Monterrey	3	1	2	0	5	1	+4	5	Advance to knockout stage
3	(Argentina) River Plate	3	1	1	1	3	3	0	4	
4	(Japan) Urawa Red Diamonds	3	0	0	3	2	9	−7	0	

Source: FIFA
June 17, 2025
12:00 pm PDT

River Plate (Argentina)	3–1	(Japan) Urawa Red Diamonds
Colidio 12'; Driussi 48'; Meza 73'	Report	Matsuo 58' (pen.)

Lumen Field, Seattle
Attendance: 11,974
Referee: Felix Zwayer (Germany)
June 17, 2025
6:00 pm PDT

Monterrey (Mexico)	1–1	(Italy) Inter Milan
Ramos 25'	Report	L. Martínez 42'

Rose Bowl, Pasadena
Attendance: 40,311
Referee: Wilton Sampaio (Brazil)

June 21, 2025
12:00 pm PDT

Inter Milan (Italy)	2–1	(Japan) Urawa Red Diamonds
L. Martínez 78'; Carboni 90+2'	Report	Watanabe 11'

Lumen Field, Seattle
Attendance: 25,090
Referee: Dahane Beida (Mauritania)
June 21, 2025
6:00 pm PDT

River Plate (Argentina)	0–0	(Mexico) Monterrey
	Report

Rose Bowl, Pasadena
Attendance: 57,393
Referee: Slavko Vinčić (Slovenia)

June 25, 2025
6:00 pm PDT

Inter Milan (Italy)	2–0	(Argentina) River Plate
P. Esposito 72'; Bastoni 90+3'	Report

Lumen Field, Seattle
Attendance: 45,135
Referee: Ilgiz Tantashev (Uzbekistan)
June 25, 2025
6:00 pm PDT

Urawa Red Diamonds (Japan)	0–4	(Mexico) Monterrey
	Report	Deossa 30'; Berterame 34', 90+7'; Corona 39'

Rose Bowl, Pasadena
Attendance: 14,312
Referee: Felix Zwayer (Germany)

=== Group F ===
Pos	Team	Pld	W	D	L	GF	GA	GD	Pts	Qualification
1	(Germany) Borussia Dortmund	3	2	1	0	5	3	+2	7	Advance to knockout stage
2	(Brazil) Fluminense	3	1	2	0	4	2	+2	5	Advance to knockout stage
3	(South Africa) Mamelodi Sundowns	3	1	1	1	4	4	0	4	
4	(South Korea) Ulsan HD	3	0	0	3	2	6	−4	0	

Source: FIFA
June 17, 2025
12:00 pm EDT

Fluminense (Brazil)	0–0	(Germany) Borussia Dortmund
	Report

MetLife Stadium, East Rutherford
Attendance: 34,736
Referee: Ilgiz Tantashev (Uzbekistan)
June 17, 2025
7:05 pm EDT (Note: The Ulsan HD vs Mamelodi Sundowns match, originally scheduled for 6:00 pm EDT, was delayed to 7:05 pm EDT due to adverse weather conditions.)

Ulsan HD (South Korea)	0–1	(South Africa) Mamelodi Sundowns
	Report	Rayners 36'

Inter&Co Stadium, Orlando
Attendance: 3,412
Referee: Clément Turpin (France)

June 21, 2025
12:00 pm EDT

Mamelodi Sundowns (South Africa)	3–4	(Germany) Borussia Dortmund
Ribeiro 11'; Rayners 62'; Mothiba 90'	Report	Nmecha 16'; Guirassy 34'; Bellingham 45'; Mudau 59' (o.g.)

TQL Stadium, Cincinnati
Attendance: 14,006
Referee: Juan Gabriel Benítez (Paraguay)
June 21, 2025
6:00 pm EDT

Fluminense (Brazil)	4–2	(South Korea) Ulsan HD
Arias 27'; Nonato 66'; Freytes 83'; Keno 90+2'	Report	Lee Jin-hyun 37'; Um Won-sang 45+3'

MetLife Stadium, East Rutherford
Attendance: 29,321
Referee: Michael Oliver (England)

June 25, 2025
3:00 pm EDT

Borussia Dortmund (Germany)	1–0	(South Korea) Ulsan HD
Svensson 36'	Report

TQL Stadium, Cincinnati
Attendance: 8,239
Referee: Tori Penso (United States)
June 25, 2025
3:00 pm EDT

Mamelodi Sundowns (South Africa)	0–0	(Brazil) Fluminense
	Report

Hard Rock Stadium, Miami Gardens
Attendance: 14,312
Referee: Anthony Taylor (England)

=== Group G ===
Pos	Team	Pld	W	D	L	GF	GA	GD	Pts	Qualification
1	(England) Manchester City	3	3	0	0	13	2	+11	9	Advance to knockout stage
2	(Italy) Juventus	3	2	0	1	11	6	+5	6	Advance to knockout stage
3	(United Arab Emirates) Al Ain	3	1	0	2	2	12	−10	3	
4	(Morocco) Wydad AC	3	0	0	3	2	8	−6	0	

Source: FIFA
June 18, 2025
12:00 pm EDT

Manchester City (England)	2–0	(Morocco) Wydad AC
Foden 2'; Doku 42'	Report

Lincoln Financial Field, Philadelphia
Attendance: 37,446
Referee: Ramon Abatti (Brazil)
June 18, 2025
9:00 pm EDT

Al Ain (United Arab Emirates)	0–5	(Italy) Juventus
	Report	Kolo Muani 11', 45+4'; Conceição 21', 58'; Yıldız 31'

Audi Field, Washington, D.C.
Attendance: 18,161
Referee: Tori Penso (United States)

June 22, 2025
12:00 pm EDT

Juventus (Italy)	4–1	(Morocco) Wydad AC
Boutouil 6' (o.g.); Yıldız 16', 69'; Vlahović 90+4' (pen.)	Report	Lorch 25'

Lincoln Financial Field, Philadelphia
Attendance: 31,975
Referee: Saíd Martínez (Honduras)
June 22, 2025
9:00 pm EDT

Manchester City (England)	6–0	(United Arab Emirates) Al Ain
Gündoğan 8', 73'; Echeverri 27'; Haaland 45+5' (pen.); Bobb 84'; Cherki 89'	Report

Mercedes-Benz Stadium, Atlanta
Attendance: 40,392
Referee: Mustapha Ghorbal (Algeria)

June 26, 2025
3:00 pm EDT

Juventus (Italy)	2–5	(England) Manchester City
Koopmeiners 11'; Vlahović 84'	Report	Doku 9'; Kalulu 26' (o.g.); Haaland 52'; Foden 69'; Savinho 75'

Camping World Stadium, Orlando
Attendance: 54,320
Referee: Clément Turpin (France)
June 26, 2025
3:00 pm EDT

Wydad AC (Morocco)	1–2	(United Arab Emirates) Al Ain
Mailula 4'	Report	Laba 45+1' (pen.); Kaku 50'

Audi Field, Washington, D.C.
Attendance: 10,785
Referee: Drew Fischer (Canada)

=== Group H ===
Pos	Team	Pld	W	D	L	GF	GA	GD	Pts	Qualification
1	(Spain) Real Madrid	3	2	1	0	7	2	+5	7	Advance to knockout stage
2	(Saudi Arabia) Al Hilal	3	1	2	0	3	1	+2	5	Advance to knockout stage
3	(Austria) Red Bull Salzburg	3	1	1	1	2	4	−2	4	
4	(Mexico) Pachuca	3	0	0	3	2	7	−5	0	

Source: FIFA
June 18, 2025
3:00 pm EDT

Real Madrid (Spain)	1–1	(Saudi Arabia) Al Hilal
G. García 34'	Report	Neves 41' (pen.)

Hard Rock Stadium, Miami Gardens
Attendance: 62,415
Referee: Facundo Tello (Argentina)
June 18, 2025
6:00 pm EDT

Pachuca (Mexico)	1–2	(Austria) Red Bull Salzburg
González 56'	Report	Gloukh 42'; Onisiwo 76'

TQL Stadium, Cincinnati
Attendance: 5,282
Referee: Mustapha Ghorbal (Algeria)

June 22, 2025
3:00 pm EDT

Real Madrid (Spain)	3–1	(Mexico) Pachuca
Bellingham 35'; Güler 43'; Valverde 70'	Report	Montiel 80'

Bank of America Stadium, Charlotte
Attendance: 70,248
Referee: Ramon Abatti (Brazil)
June 22, 2025
6:00 pm EDT

Red Bull Salzburg (Austria)	0–0	(Saudi Arabia) Al Hilal
	Report

Audi Field, Washington, D.C.
Attendance: 16,167
Referee: Wilton Sampaio (Brazil)

June 26, 2025
8:00 pm CDT

Al Hilal (Saudi Arabia)	2–0	(Mexico) Pachuca
S. Al-Dawsari 22'; Marcos Leonardo 90+5'	Report

Geodis Park, Nashville
Attendance: 14,147
Referee: Danny Makkelie (Netherlands)
June 26, 2025
9:00 pm EDT

Red Bull Salzburg (Austria)	0–3	(Spain) Real Madrid
	Report	Vinícius 40'; Valverde 45+3'; G. García 84'

Lincoln Financial Field, Philadelphia
Attendance: 64,811
Referee: Dahane Beida (Mauritania)

== Knockout stage ==
In the knockout stage, if the scores were equal when normal playing time expired, extra time was played for two periods of 15 minutes each. This was followed, if required, by a penalty shootout to determine the winners.

=== Bracket ===
Round of 16
June 30 – Charlotte
(Italy) Inter Milan	0
(Brazil) Fluminense	2
June 30 – Orlando
(England) Manchester City	3
(Saudi Arabia) Al Hilal (a.e.t.)	4
June 28 – Philadelphia
(Brazil) Palmeiras (a.e.t.)	1
(Brazil) Botafogo	0
June 28 – Charlotte
(Portugal) Benfica	1
(England) Chelsea (a.e.t.)	4
June 29 – Atlanta
(France) Paris Saint-Germain	4
(United States) Inter Miami CF	0
June 29 – Miami Gardens
(Brazil) Flamengo	2
(Germany) Bayern Munich	4
July 1 – Miami Gardens
(Spain) Real Madrid	1
(Italy) Juventus	0
July 1 – Atlanta
(Germany) Borussia Dortmund	2
(Mexico) Monterrey	1

Quarterfinals
July 4 – Orlando
(Brazil) Fluminense	2
(Saudi Arabia) Al Hilal	1
July 4 – Philadelphia
(Brazil) Palmeiras	1
(England) Chelsea	2
July 5 – Atlanta
(France) Paris Saint-Germain	2
(Germany) Bayern Munich	0
July 5 – East Rutherford
(Spain) Real Madrid	3
(Germany) Borussia Dortmund	2

Semifinals
July 8 – East Rutherford
(Brazil) Fluminense	0
(England) Chelsea	2
July 9 – East Rutherford
(France) Paris Saint-Germain	4
(Spain) Real Madrid	0

Final
July 13 – East Rutherford
(England) Chelsea	3
(France) Paris Saint-Germain	0

=== Round of 16 ===
June 28, 2025
12:00 pm EDT

Palmeiras (Brazil)	1–0 (a.e.t.)	(Brazil) Botafogo
Paulinho 100'	Report

Lincoln Financial Field, Philadelphia
Attendance: 33,657
Referee: François Letexier (France)

June 28, 2025
4:00 pm EDT

Benfica (Portugal)	1–4 (a.e.t.)	(England) Chelsea
Di María 90+5' (pen.)	Report	James 64'; Nkunku 108'; Neto 114'; Dewsbury-Hall 117'

Bank of America Stadium, Charlotte
Attendance: 25,929
Referee: Slavko Vinčić (Slovenia)

June 29, 2025
12:00 pm EDT

Paris Saint-Germain (France)	4–0	(United States) Inter Miami CF
Neves 6', 39'; Avilés 44' (o.g.); Hakimi 45+3'	Report

Mercedes-Benz Stadium, Atlanta
Attendance: 65,574
Referee: Wilton Sampaio (Brazil)

June 29, 2025
4:00 pm EDT

Flamengo (Brazil)	2–4	(Germany) Bayern Munich
Gerson 33'; Jorginho 55' (pen.)	Report	Pulgar 6' (o.g.); Kane 9', 73'; Goretzka 41'

Hard Rock Stadium, Miami Gardens
Attendance: 60,914
Referee: Michael Oliver (England)

June 30, 2025
3:00 pm EDT

Inter Milan (Italy)	0–2	(Brazil) Fluminense
	Report	Cano 3'; Hércules 90+3'

Bank of America Stadium, Charlotte
Attendance: 20,030
Referee: Iván Barton (El Salvador)

June 30, 2025
9:00 pm EDT

Manchester City (England)	3–4 (a.e.t.)	(Saudi Arabia) Al Hilal
Silva 9'; Haaland 55'; Foden 104'	Report	Marcos Leonardo 46', 112'; Malcom 52'; Koulibaly 94'

Camping World Stadium, Orlando
Attendance: 42,311
Referee: Jesús Valenzuela (Venezuela)

July 1, 2025
3:00 pm EDT

Real Madrid (Spain)	1–0	(Italy) Juventus
G. García 54'	Report

Hard Rock Stadium, Miami Gardens
Attendance: 62,149
Referee: Szymon Marciniak (Poland)

July 1, 2025
9:00 pm EDT

Borussia Dortmund (Germany)	2–1	(Mexico) Monterrey
Guirassy 14', 24'	Report	Berterame 48'

Mercedes-Benz Stadium, Atlanta
Attendance: 31,442
Referee: Facundo Tello (Argentina)

=== Quarterfinals ===
July 4, 2025
3:00 pm EDT

Fluminense (Brazil)	2–1	(Saudi Arabia) Al Hilal
Martinelli 40'; Hércules 70'	Report	Marcos Leonardo 51'

Camping World Stadium, Orlando
Attendance: 43,091
Referee: Danny Makkelie (Netherlands)

July 4, 2025
9:00 pm EDT

Palmeiras (Brazil)	1–2	(England) Chelsea
Estêvão 53'	Report	Palmer 16'; Weverton 83' (o.g.)

Lincoln Financial Field, Philadelphia
Attendance: 65,782
Referee: Alireza Faghani (Australia)

July 5, 2025
12:00 pm EDT

Paris Saint-Germain (France)	2–0	(Germany) Bayern Munich
Doué 78'; Dembélé 90+6'	Report

Mercedes-Benz Stadium, Atlanta
Attendance: 66,937
Referee: Anthony Taylor (England)

July 5, 2025
4:00 pm EDT

Real Madrid (Spain)	3–2	(Germany) Borussia Dortmund
G. García 10'; F. García 20'; Mbappé 90+4'	Report	Beier 90+3'; Guirassy 90+8' (pen.)

MetLife Stadium, East Rutherford
Attendance: 76,611
Referee: Ramon Abatti (Brazil)

=== Semifinals ===
July 8, 2025
3:00 pm EDT

Fluminense (Brazil)	0–2	(England) Chelsea
	Report	João Pedro 18', 56'

MetLife Stadium, East Rutherford
Attendance: 70,556
Referee: François Letexier (France)

July 9, 2025
3:10 pm EDT (Note: The match, originally scheduled for 3:00 pm EDT, was delayed to 3:10 pm EDT due to the late arrival of the team buses.)

Paris Saint-Germain (France)	4–0	(Spain) Real Madrid
Fabián 6', 24'; Dembélé 9'; Ramos 87'	Report

MetLife Stadium, East Rutherford
Attendance: 77,542
Referee: Szymon Marciniak (Poland)

=== Final ===
July 13, 2025
3:00 pm EDT

Chelsea (The Football Association)	3–0	(French Football Federation) Paris Saint-Germain
Palmer 22', 30'; João Pedro 43'	Report

MetLife Stadium, East Rutherford
Attendance: 81,118
Referee: Alireza Faghani (Australia)

== Statistics ==
=== Top goalscorers ===
Rank	Player	Team	Goals
1	(Argentina) Ángel Di María	(Portugal) Benfica	4
1	(Spain) Gonzalo García	(Spain) Real Madrid	4
1	(Guinea) Serhou Guirassy	(Germany) Borussia Dortmund	4
1	(Brazil) Marcos Leonardo	(Saudi Arabia) Al Hilal	4
5	(Palestine) Wessam Abou Ali	(Egypt) Al Ahly	3
5	(Mexico) Germán Berterame	(Mexico) Monterrey	3
5	(England) Phil Foden	(England) Manchester City	3
5	(Norway) Erling Haaland	(England) Manchester City	3
5	(England) Harry Kane	(Germany) Bayern Munich	3
5	(Germany) Jamal Musiala	(Germany) Bayern Munich	3
5	(Portugal) Pedro Neto	(England) Chelsea	3
5	(France) Michael Olise	(Germany) Bayern Munich	3
5	(England) Cole Palmer	(England) Chelsea	3
5	(Brazil) João Pedro	(England) Chelsea	3
5	(Spain) Fabián Ruiz	(France) Paris Saint-Germain	3
5	(Turkey) Kenan Yıldız	(Italy) Juventus	3

1 own goal

- (Palestine) Wessam Abou Ali (Al Ahly, against Palmeiras)
- (Argentina) Tomás Avilés (Inter Miami, against Paris Saint-Germain)
- (Morocco) Abdelmounaim Boutouil (Wydad, against Juventus)
- (New Zealand) Nathan Garrow (Auckland City, against Boca Juniors)
- (France) Pierre Kalulu (Juventus, against Manchester City)
- (South Africa) Khuliso Mudau (Mamelodi Sundowns, against Borussia Dortmund)
- (Argentina) Nicolás Otamendi (Benfica, against Boca Juniors)
- (Chile) Erick Pulgar (Flamengo, against Bayern Munich)
- (Brazil) Weverton (Palmeiras, against Chelsea)

== Awards ==
The following awards were given at the conclusion of the tournament.

Golden Ball	Silver Ball	Bronze Ball
(England) Cole Palmer (Chelsea)	(Portugal) Vitinha (Paris Saint-Germain)	(Ecuador) Moisés Caicedo (Chelsea)
Top Goal Scorer Award
(Spain) Gonzalo García (Real Madrid)
Golden Glove
(Spain) Robert Sánchez (Chelsea)
FIFA Young Player Award
(France) Désiré Doué (Paris Saint-Germain)
FIFA Fair Play Trophy
(Germany) Bayern Munich

FIFA also named a man of the match for the best player in each game at the tournament. For sponsorship reasons, this was known as the "Michelob Ultra Superior Player of the Match" award.

Man of the Match
Match	Man of the match	Club	Opponent
1	(Argentina) Oscar Ustari	(United States) Inter Miami	(Egypt) Al Ahly
2	(France) Michael Olise	(Germany) Bayern Munich	(New Zealand) Auckland City
3	(Portugal) Vitinha	(France) Paris Saint-Germain	(Spain) Atlético Madrid
4	(Brazil) Estêvão	(Brazil) Palmeiras	(Portugal) Porto
5	(Brazil) Igor Jesus	(Brazil) Botafogo	(United States) Seattle Sounders
6	(Portugal) Pedro Neto	(England) Chelsea	(United States) Los Angeles FC
7	(Uruguay) Miguel Merentiel	(Argentina) Boca Juniors	(Portugal) Benfica
8	(Uruguay) Giorgian de Arrascaeta	(Brazil) Flamengo	(Tunisia) Espérance de Tunis
9	(Colombia) Jhon Arias	(Brazil) Fluminense	(Germany) Borussia Dortmund
10	(Argentina) Facundo Colidio	(Argentina) River Plate	(Japan) Urawa Red Diamonds
11	(South Africa) Iqraam Rayners	(South Africa) Mamelodi Sundowns	(South Korea) Ulsan HD
12	(Spain) Sergio Ramos	(Mexico) Monterrey	(Italy) Inter Milan
13	(England) Phil Foden	(England) Manchester City	(Morocco) Wydad
14	(Spain) Gonzalo García	(Spain) Real Madrid	(Saudi Arabia) Al Hilal
15	(Israel) Oscar Gloukh	(Austria) Red Bull Salzburg	(Mexico) Pachuca
16	(France) Randal Kolo Muani	(Italy) Juventus	(United Arab Emirates) Al Ain
17	(Brazil) Estêvão	(Brazil) Palmeiras	(Egypt) Al Ahly
18	(Argentina) Lionel Messi	(United States) Inter Miami	(Portugal) Porto
19	(Spain) Pablo Barrios	(Spain) Atlético Madrid	(United States) Seattle Sounders
20	(Brazil) Igor Jesus	(Brazil) Botafogo	(France) Paris Saint-Germain
21	(Argentina) Ángel Di María	(Portugal) Benfica	(New Zealand) Auckland City
22	(Brazil) Bruno Henrique	(Brazil) Flamengo	(England) Chelsea
23	(Algeria) Youcef Belaïli	(Tunisia) Espérance de Tunis	(United States) Los Angeles FC
24	(England) Harry Kane	(Germany) Bayern Munich	(Argentina) Boca Juniors
25	(England) Jobe Bellingham	(Germany) Borussia Dortmund	(South Africa) Mamelodi Sundowns
26	(Japan) Ryōma Watanabe	(Japan) Urawa Red Diamonds	(Italy) Inter Milan
27	(Colombia) Jhon Arias	(Brazil) Fluminense	(South Korea) Ulsan HD
28	(Argentina) Franco Mastantuono	(Argentina) River Plate	(Mexico) Monterrey
29	(Turkey) Kenan Yıldız	(Italy) Juventus	(Morocco) Wydad
30	(England) Jude Bellingham	(Spain) Real Madrid	(Mexico) Pachuca
31	(Morocco) Yassine Bounou	(Saudi Arabia) Al Hilal	(Austria) Red Bull Salzburg
32	(Germany) İlkay Gündoğan	(England) Manchester City	(United Arab Emirates) Al Ain
33	(Morocco) Achraf Hakimi	(France) Paris Saint-Germain	(United States) Seattle Sounders
34	(France) Antoine Griezmann	(Spain) Atlético Madrid	(Brazil) Botafogo
35	(Uruguay) Luis Suárez	(United States) Inter Miami	(Brazil) Palmeiras
36	(Palestine) Wessam Abou Ali	(Egypt) Al Ahly	(Portugal) Porto
37	(New Zealand) Christian Gray	(New Zealand) Auckland City	(Argentina) Boca Juniors
38	(Ukraine) Anatoliy Trubin	(Portugal) Benfica	(Germany) Bayern Munich
39	(Uruguay) Giorgian de Arrascaeta	(Brazil) Flamengo	(United States) Los Angeles FC
40	(England) Tosin Adarabioyo	(England) Chelsea	(Tunisia) Espérance de Tunis
41	(Sweden) Daniel Svensson	(Germany) Borussia Dortmund	(South Korea) Ulsan HD
42	(Brazil) Ignácio	(Brazil) Fluminense	(South Africa) Mamelodi Sundowns
43	(Italy) Francesco Pio Esposito	(Italy) Inter Milan	(Argentina) River Plate
44	(Mexico) Germán Berterame	(Mexico) Monterrey	(Japan) Urawa Red Diamonds
45	(Belgium) Jérémy Doku	(England) Manchester City	(Italy) Juventus
46	(Togo) Kodjo Fo-Doh Laba	(United Arab Emirates) Al Ain	(Morocco) Wydad
47	(Saudi Arabia) Salem Al-Dawsari	(Saudi Arabia) Al Hilal	(Mexico) Pachuca
48	(Brazil) Vinícius Júnior	(Spain) Real Madrid	(Austria) Red Bull Salzburg
49	(Brazil) John	(Brazil) Botafogo	(Brazil) Palmeiras
50	(Ecuador) Moisés Caicedo	(England) Chelsea	(Portugal) Benfica
51	(Portugal) João Neves	(France) Paris Saint-Germain	(United States) Inter Miami
52	(England) Harry Kane	(Germany) Bayern Munich	(Brazil) Flamengo
53	(Colombia) Jhon Arias	(Brazil) Fluminense	(Italy) Inter Milan
54	(Brazil) Marcos Leonardo	(Saudi Arabia) Al Hilal	(England) Manchester City
55	(Uruguay) Federico Valverde	(Spain) Real Madrid	(Italy) Juventus
56	(Guinea) Serhou Guirassy	(Germany) Borussia Dortmund	(Mexico) Monterrey
57	(Brazil) Hércules	(Brazil) Fluminense	(Saudi Arabia) Al Hilal
58	(Brazil) Estêvão	(Brazil) Palmeiras	(England) Chelsea
59	(France) Désiré Doué	(France) Paris Saint-Germain	(Germany) Bayern Munich
60	(Spain) Fran García	(Spain) Real Madrid	(Germany) Borussia Dortmund
61	(Brazil) João Pedro	(England) Chelsea	(Brazil) Fluminense
62	(Spain) Fabián Ruiz	(France) Paris Saint-Germain	(Spain) Real Madrid
63	(England) Cole Palmer	(England) Chelsea	(France) Paris Saint-Germain

Additionally, FIFA also shortlisted ten goals for the goal of the tournament award, which Lucas Ribeiro of Mamelodi Sundowns won for his goal against Borussia Dortmund, beating the likes of Lionel Messi's free kick against Porto, Kenan Yıldız against Al Ain and João Pedro against Fluminense.

=== Team of the tournament ===
The FIFA Club World Cup 2025 Best XI is a selection of eleven players who were named among the tournament's best performers.

Goalkeeper	Defenders	Midfielders	Forwards
(Morocco) Yassine Bounou	(Morocco) Achraf Hakimi (Brazil) Marquinhos (Brazil) Thiago Silva (Spain) Marc Cucurella	(Portugal) Vitinha (Argentina) Enzo Fernández (England) Cole Palmer	(Portugal) Pedro Neto (Colombia) Jhon Arias (Spain) Gonzalo García

== Prize money ==
The distribution model split a total prize pool of US$1 billion between the 32 participating clubs. The winner of the tournament was awarded up to US$125 million, marking a significant increase in financial rewards compared to previous editions. In addition to the prize money for the participating teams, a solidarity investment program had a target of an additional US$250 million being provided to club football across the world.

The distribution model for the 2025 edition was as follows:

Sporting performance pillar (US$475 million): Increasing payouts based on performance in the tournament.

- Group stage (three matches): + $2.0 million per win; + $1.0 million draw
- Round of 16: + $7.5 million
- Quarterfinal: + $13.125 million
- Semifinal: + $21.0 million
- Finalist: + $30.0 million
- Winner: + $40.0 million

Participation pillar (US$525 million): Guaranteed payments to all 32 clubs (amounts are per club).

- Europe: $12.81–38.19 million (determined by a ranking based on sporting and commercial criteria)
- South America: $15.21 million
- North, Central America & Caribbean: $9.55 million
- Asia: $9.55 million
- Africa: $9.55 million
- Oceania: $3.58 million

Solidarity payments (US$250 million): In addition to the prize money for the participating teams, these payments were allocated to support clubs worldwide, fostering development and inclusivity in global football.

== Broadcasting ==
In July 2024, FIFA opened bids for media rights to the Club World Cup in the Americas, Asia, the Middle East and North Africa. It was reported that Apple (owner of the global rights to Major League Soccer) had attempted to make a $1 billion bid for global rights to the 2025 Club World Cup, but negotiations with FIFA had reportedly stalled; the bid was said to be a quarter of what FIFA had targeted for the rights to the tournament. On September 19, 2024, FIFA called an emergency meeting to discuss broadcasting rights, as it had not yet reached deals in a number of major markets.

On December 4, 2024, DAZN acquired global rights to the tournament for €1 billion, streaming all matches for free. DAZN would also collaborate with Host Broadcasting Services (HBS) on aspects of the world feed production. In some regions, DAZN sublicensed coverage to linear television broadcasters. In the United States, DAZN reached sub-licensing and co-production agreements with Warner Bros. Discovery's TNT Sports (English) and TelevisaUnivision's TUDN (Spanish), under which their respective properties would hold exclusive rights to portions of the tournament. The two divisions would co-produce studio programming for the tournament seen across their properties and DAZN, with TNT Sports originating English-language coverage from its studios in Atlanta.

Media reports suggested that DAZN struggled to find a buyer in the UK, as the BBC was unwilling to sublicense for fear of promoting a commercial broadcaster, and ITV had attempted to obtain the rights for free before the deal was signed with DAZN. The rights were eventually sublicensed to 5, which enjoyed strong ratings in the 16–34 demographic.

On April 10, 2025, Chinese streaming platform Migu acquired broadcast rights in China to the 2025 and 2029 Club World Cup. Since DAZN does not operate in China, it was understood that FIFA negotiated the deal with Migu directly in partnership with the Chinese Football Association. On June 11, 2025, Coupang Play in South Korea announced it would provide coverage of the FIFA Club World Cup under a separate pricing plan to its basic plan. In the days prior to the tournament, Sportradar announced agreements to serve as the exclusive provider of real-time sports betting data for the tournament, expanding upon existing agreements with FIFA to provide match integrity services. The agreement also included non-exclusive rights to distribute DAZN's coverage of the tournament via sports betting platforms.

The following is the list of DAZN sublicensed broadcasters:

Territory	Rights holder(s)	Package of matches	Ref.
International in-flight and on-board	Sport24	All matches	
Afghanistan	ATN	All matches	
Albania	SuperSport	All matches (EBU sublicenced)	
Angola	ZAP	All matches	
Argentina	Telefe	21 matches	
Australia	Fox Sports / Kayo Sports	All matches	
Bulgaria	BNT	Two matches per day (deal w/EBU)	
Bolivia	Tigo Sports	All matches	
Bolivia	Tuves	All matches	
Bolivia	Cotas	All matches	
Bolivia	COTAP R. L.	All matches	
Bolivia	Entel Bolivia	All matches	
Bolivia	XDigital Bolivia	All matches	
Bolivia	Red Uno	14 matches	
Brazil	CazéTV	All matches	
Brazil	Grupo Globo	All matches (pay TV)	
Brazil	Grupo Globo	25 group matches+select KOs (FTA TV)	
Cape Verde	TCV	20 matches	
Caribbean	Rush Sports	All matches	
Caribbean	DSports (Note: Aruba, Barbados, Curaçao, Guyana, Suriname, Trinidad and Tobago)	All matches	
Chile	Chilevisión	One match per day	
Colombia	Win Sports	21 matches	
Côte d'Ivoire	NCI	28 matches	
Costa Rica	Teletica	All matches	
Czechia	Nova Sport	All matches (EBU sublicenced)	
Czechia	One Play Sport	All matches (EBU sublicenced)	
Ecuador	Teleamazonas	Selected Matches	
Egypt	MBC Group	26 matches	
El Salvador	Canal 4	All matches	
Eswatini	Eswatini TV	All matches	
France	TF1	Paris Saint-Germain debut match + final	
Georgia	GPB	All matches	
Germany	ProSiebenSat.1	German teams only	
Ghana	Sporty TV	26 matches	
Greece	ANT1/ANT1+	15 matches (FTATV)	
Greece	ANT1/ANT1+	All Matches (streaming)	
Guatemala	TV Azteca Guate	All matches	
Honduras	Deportes TVC	All matches	
Hungary	M4 Sport	half of scheduled matches (deal w/EBU)	
Hungary	Network4	half of scheduled matches (EBU sublicence)	
Israel	Sport 5	All matches	
Italy	Mediaset	One match per day	
Lithuania	TV3	One match per day	
Lithuania	Go3	All matches	
Kenya	Sporty TV	26 matches	
Kosovo	Artmotion	All matches (EBU sublicenced)	
Maldives	ICE Network	All matches	
Malta	TVM	All matches (deal w/EBU)	
Mauritius	MBC	Selected matches	
Mexico	TelevisaUnivision	31 matches	
Montenegro	RTCG	All matches (deal w/EBU)	
Mozambique	ZAP	All matches	
Mozambique	TV Miramar	20 matches	
Nicaragua	Viva Nicaragua	All matches	
Nigeria	Sporty TV	26 matches	
Norway	VG+	58 matches	
Panama	Nex	All matches	
Paraguay	Tigo Sports	All matches	
Peru	América Televisión	One match per day	
Portugal	TVI	12 matches	
Romania	Pro TV	All matches (EBU sublicenced)	
Romania	Voyo	All matches (EBU sublicenced)	
Russia	Okko	All matches	
Rwanda	RTV	20 matches	
Seychelles	SBC 3	21 matches	
Slovakia	Voyo	All matches (EBU sublicenced)	
Slovakia	Nova Sport	25 matches (EBU sublicenced)	
South Africa	Sporty TV	26 matches	
South Korea	Coupang Play	All matches	
South America (excluding Bolivia and Brazil)	DSports	All matches (not included in Paraguay)	
South America (excluding Bolivia and Brazil)	Disney+	Argentine teams' matches + 16 matches	
Spain	Mediaset	One match per day	
Sub-Saharan Africa	Azam TV	All matches	
Sub-Saharan Africa	GOtv	All matches	
Sub-Saharan Africa	StarTimes Sports	All matches	
Sub-Saharan Africa	New World Sport	All matches	
Sub-Saharan Africa	SuperSport	All matches	
Turkey	TRT	All matches (deal w/EBU)	
Ukraine	Suspilne Sport	25 group matches and all KO (deal w/EBU)	
Ukraine	MEGOGO	25 group matches and all KO (deal w/EBU)	
United Kingdom	5	23 matches	
United States	TNT Sports (English)	24 matches (collaborated on host broadcasting duties; co-developed studio programming with DAZN as United States rights holders)	
United States	TelevisaUnivision (Spanish)	18 matches	
Uruguay	Flow	52 matches	
Uruguay	Nuevo Siglo	52 matches	
Uruguay	Montecable	52 matches	
Uruguay	TCC	52 matches	
Uzbekistan	NTRC	All matches	
Uzbekistan	Zoʻr TV	All matches	
Venezuela	Televen	All matches	
Vietnam	FPT Play	All matches (with an alternative "emotional" commentary stream in selected matches)	

The following was the direct licensing partner:

Territory	Rights holder(s)	Package of matches	Ref.
China	Migu	All matches	

== Marketing ==
=== Branding ===
On September 4, 2024, FIFA released the official emblem and audio signature of the tournament. The emblem took inspiration from the ball, football history and culture, with the initials of the tournament abstracted into a circular icon. The official audio featured Italian singer Gala's song "Freed from Desire". On November 14, FIFA unveiled the new Club World Cup trophy. On January 29, 2025, it was announced that FIFA Music Ambassador Robbie Williams would perform at the tournament, including a new song.

=== Match ball ===
On January 31, 2025, the official match ball was revealed by Adidas. The design featured jagged-edged block patterns and deconstructed stars and stripes in red, white, and blue, the colors of the flag of the United States. On July 7, the official match ball for the final was revealed. It featured the same design as the previous ball, but the red part was switched to gold. The ball was used for the tournament's last three matches: both semi-finals and the final, all of which were held at the MetLife Stadium in East Rutherford.

=== Music ===
Alongside Gala's "Freed from Desire", a remake of the Queen song "We Will Rock You" by American rapper Pitbull and producer RedOne served as one of the official songs of the tournament. Pitbull sang the 2014 FIFA World Cup official song, "We Are One (Ole Ola)", while RedOne produced the 2022 tournament's official album. The TV title sequence used a remix of "Freed from Desire" released by Diplo the previous year.

The listening of "Freed from Desire" exploded during the tournament, with various Internet memes using the song being made in various social media platforms and Spotify announcing a rise of over 13% in daily average listening globally during late June 2025, including a boost YoY in some regions; as an example, in Brazil, the song had a rise of over 850% vs. the same period in 2024 and a 450% rise just in the first half of June 2025.

=== Sponsorship ===
FIFA Club World Cup 2025 Partners	FIFA Club World Cup 2025 Suppliers
AB InBev (Michelob Ultra and Budweiser); Airbnb; Bank of America; Betano; Coca-Cola; Hisense; Home Depot; Jeep; Lenovo (Motorola); Panini; PIF; Qatar Airways; Visa	Adidas; AIM Sports; ChargeFuze; Evolv; Rock-it Cargo; LVMH (Tiffany & Co.); Taittinger

== Reception ==
=== Impact of added European fixtures ===
The proposed expansion of the FIFA Club World Cup drew criticism from several football stakeholders, including FIFPRO, a global union representing players from 66 associations, and the World Leagues Forum, which represents 47 professional leagues, both citing concerns about player welfare and fixture congestion. La Liga also voiced opposition and threatened legal action. Critics accused FIFA of prioritising commercial interests over player health. The introduction of the annual FIFA Intercontinental Cup was similarly criticised. In May 2024, FIFPRO and the World Leagues Forum sent a letter to FIFA demanding rescheduling and reform of the FIFA International Match Calendar and warned of legal or other action if their concerns were ignored. On June 13, 2024, the English Professional Footballers' Association and France's Union Nationale des Footballeurs Professionnels filed a legal claim in the Business Court in Brussels to protest the tournament. FIFPRO also warned of potential strike action. On January 30, 2025, a meeting between FIFA and FIFPRO was held to address fixture congestion. In response to the criticism, FIFA stated that the Club World Cup's schedule followed the international calendar and allowed for rest before domestic competitions, adding that its events occupied just 1 percent of the football calendar and were agreed with players and confederations.

=== Impact of multi-club ownership ===
Several clubs in the 2025 FIFA Club World Cup were linked to multi-club ownership structures, raising concerns about conflicts of interest. Among them were Mexican sides Pachuca and León, both owned by Grupo Pachuca. FIFA regulations prohibit any club from owning shares in, being a member of, or exerting influence over another participating club, with "influence" defined through control of voting rights or decision-making authority. In November 2024, Costa Rican club Alajuelense requested FIFA to apply this rule and disqualify one of the two Grupo Pachuca clubs, threatening legal action if no action was taken. Alajuelense argued that it was next in line to qualify under CONCACAF's rankings, but FIFA determined the club could not be party to proceedings. On February 4, 2025, Alajuelense appealed to the Court of Arbitration for Sport against FIFA, Pachuca, and León. On March 21, FIFA announced that León had been removed from the tournament. According to The Guardian, a play-off would determine the replacement between Los Angeles FC, runner-up of the 2023 CONCACAF Champions League, and América, the highest-ranked Mexican club not already qualified. Alajuelense and the Philadelphia Union were not considered. León appealed, and hearings for both its case and Alajuelense's took place in April and May 2025 respectively, but on May 6 FIFA confirmed that León's expulsion would stand and that the play-off would proceed. LAFC secured the final spot with a 2–1 extra time win over América on May 31 at BMO Stadium.

=== Ticket prices and attendance ===
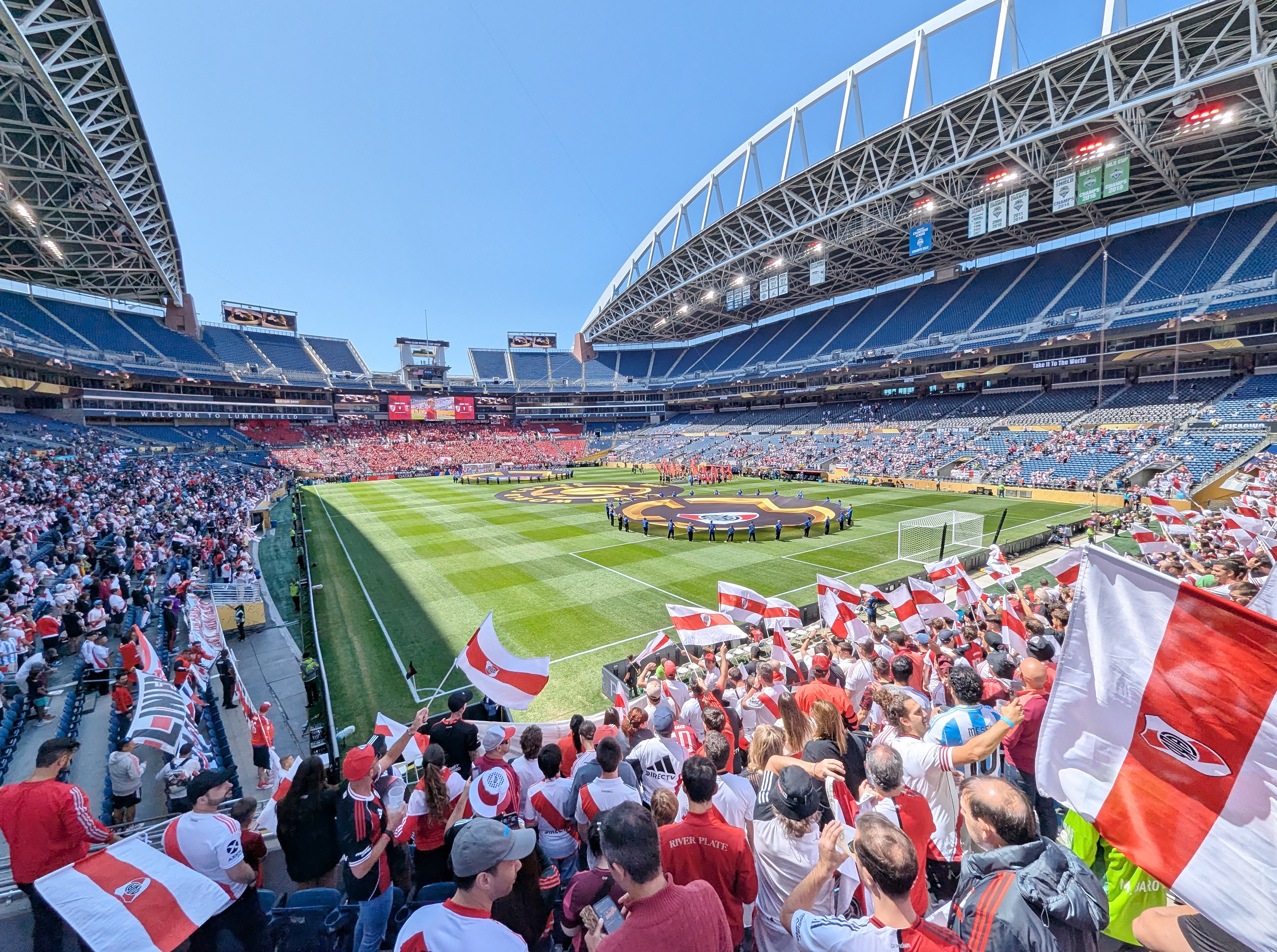
The group stage game between River Plate and Urawa Red Diamonds in Seattle drew 11,974 spectators

Ticket prices for the 2025 FIFA Club World Cup attracted early scrutiny from some fans, who noted that certain final seats were listed at over US$2,200 due to dynamic pricing models, although FIFA later adjusted prices in February 2025, lowering them to around US$140 for the semifinals and US$300 for the final to make the tournament more accessible. A 10 percent cancellation fee applied to exchanges also drew attention, but the overall response to the tournament was positive. The opening fixture between Al Ahly and Inter Miami saw strong turnout following final-week promotional campaigns, and FIFA reported over 60,000 spectators in attendance, with strong international broadcast figures. By early July, FIFA had recorded over 2 million tickets sold and average attendance of approximately 36,000 per match, a figure comparable to several leading European domestic leagues. While 14 matches attracted smaller crowds of under 20,000, mostly at MLS venues, 11 fixtures surpassed 90 percent capacity, including six at Hard Rock Stadium. Supporters from South America, Africa and Asia were especially prominent throughout the tournament, although a match involving Wydad and Juventus saw minor incidents involving smoke bombs and one arrest.

=== Selection of Inter Miami CF ===
As with previous editions of the FIFA Club World Cup, the expanded 2025 format allocated a slot for the host nation. This slot had traditionally been filled by the domestic league champion of the host country. In the United States, the champion of Major League Soccer is determined through the MLS Cup playoffs, rather than regular season performance, and for the 2024 season, that playoff had not yet concluded at the time FIFA needed to confirm its selection. During the mid-season 2024 MLS All-Star Game, MLS Commissioner Don Garber stated that the slot could be awarded to the 2024 MLS Supporters' Shield winner, the MLS Cup 2024 winner, or via a playoff between the two. On October 19, 2024, FIFA announced that Inter Miami would represent the host nation as winners of the Supporters' Shield, awarding the slot before the start of the 2024 MLS Cup playoffs and after Inter Miami had already secured the Shield. FIFA stated that this decision aligned with past precedent, where clubs that won silverware in a league-style format were prioritised for the host slot, and that the announcement had been delayed due to procedural timelines for confirming regulations. Although the decision drew scrutiny from some sections of the media and fanbase, particularly regarding its timing and the involvement of Lionel Messi, others viewed it as a practical resolution in keeping with the tournament's structure and historical practice. Inter Miami were later eliminated from the playoffs by Atlanta United in the first round on November 10, but head coach Gerardo Martino defended the club's inclusion on the grounds that the Supporters' Shield constituted a valid and recognised form of domestic achievement.

=== Immigration and visa issues ===
On June 10, 2025, Immigration and Customs Enforcement (ICE) and Customs and Border Protection (CBP) announced their involvement in providing security during the first round of the 2025 FIFA Club World Cup and reminded non-American citizens to carry valid proof of legal stay. The announcement raised concerns among some fans regarding the Trump administration's deportation policy, especially as those detained could potentially face indefinite detention or be transferred to other "third countries", such as El Salvador. FIFA President Gianni Infantino defended the increased security presence, stating that the safety of fans was a top priority, particularly in light of the 2024 Copa América final, which was held in the same stadium and saw large numbers of supporters storm the gates to gain entry. Just days later, on June 15, reports surfaced that Boca Juniors defender Ayrton Costa had initially been denied a US visa due to a 2018 robbery case, although the decision was subsequently reversed and he was issued a special 26-day visa to participate in the tournament.

=== Rivalry between Europe and South America ===
The tournament intensified the rivalry between European teams and the rest of the world, in particular the South Americans. Initially the debate involved how well the non-European teams would fare against the European teams; it then intensified when South American teams began to record victories against their European counterparts. Some South American managers, fans, and journalists also tried to dismiss European criticism of the tournament as "loser excuses" and a "symbol of European arrogance and elitism". Commentators questioned whether European dominance had been overstated, with analysis suggesting that the myth of superiority was being tested by results on the pitch. In response, Paris Saint-Germain coach Luis Enrique remarked that South Americans had no need to compare themselves with Europeans, emphasising the shared global stature of both footballing regions and pointing to the widespread recruitment of South American players by European clubs. Manchester City manager Pep Guardiola offered a more supportive view of South American competitiveness, arguing that European fans should not be surprised when clubs from the region secure wins and that such outcomes reflect the real global balance of quality in football. However, Chelsea coach Enzo Maresca argued that European clubs faced congested schedules that could affect player fitness, but a journalist noted that South American teams played even more matches during the same period, challenging the idea that European sides were uniquely overworked.

The increased attention to Brazilian clubs also led to a sharp spike in global interest in the Brazilian League, with Google Trends reporting the highest search volume for the term since 2020. While the performances reignited continental pride, the on-field results remained competitive; in twelve direct UEFA–CONMEBOL encounters, European clubs registered six wins, South American clubs won three times, and three matches ended in draws.

=== Weather and logistical challenges ===
The tournament was marked by significant weather-related and logistical disruptions, raising concerns ahead of the 2026 FIFA World Cup. Several matches were delayed or temporarily suspended due to thunderstorms and lightning, with stoppages ranging from around 46 minutes to nearly two hours, as FIFA safety protocols required repeated pauses whenever lightning was detected near stadiums. High temperatures also posed a challenge, particularly for midday kickoffs, with players and coaches highlighting the physical toll of extreme heat and uneven playing conditions between day and evening matches. Beyond the pitch, severe weather contributed to travel and traffic problems, including flight delays and congestion around venues, affecting teams, officials, media, and supporters, further intensifying debate about scheduling and infrastructure preparedness for future tournaments.

=== Financial distribution and governance concerns ===
The tournament faced criticism over delays in distributing £185 million in promised solidarity payments to non-participating clubs. While participating teams received significant prize money, including around £84 million for winners Chelsea, smaller clubs and leagues questioned the lack of clarity surrounding payment formulas and timelines, renewing debates about financial inequality and transparency in FIFA's expanded competitions. These concerns were brought up again in August 2026 following the withdrawn FIFA Forward Enterprise proposal.

== See also ==
- 2025 FIFA Intercontinental Cup
- 2028 FIFA Women's Club World Cup
- 2026 FIFA World Cup
