= Tunde Oladimeji =

Nigerian filmmaker and actor

- Born: Babatunde Oladimeji; Iseyin
- Education: University of Ibadan
- Occupations: Actor; Director
- Notable work: Aajiirebi

Tunde Oladimeji is a Nigerian documentary filmmaker, actor, director and television presenter, known for pioneering documentary film in indigenous language in Nigeria. He is the director of Aajiirebi, a breakfast show airing on Africa magic Yoruba.

== Life ==
Oladimeji was born in Iseyin, Oyo State, Nigeria. His mother was a teacher and his father is a surveyor. He began his filmmaking career at the University of Ibadan where he graduated and co-produced his first film, an adaptation of the late Oladejo Okediji's 1972 book titled Agbalagba akan'.

He played a major role in Borokini, a Yoruba Telenovela and a lead role in Akekaka, a film produced by Jaiye Kuti featuring Femi Adebayo, Mercy Aigbe and Ebun Oloyede.

He was also the assistant producer of Amstel Malta Box Office Season 5 and the director of Aajiirebi. He anchored Arambara and co-directed Eleyinju aani, Arambara.

Oladimeji is the producer of Yoruba Heritage Documentary series. One of the documentary series, Ibadan was nominated in the best documentary category at the 2020 Africa Magic Viewers' Choice Awards. Other documentary in the series includes Eko àkéte, Abeokuta ilẹ̀ Ẹ̀gbá, Ife Ooye, and Oshogbo Oroki.
