= Aajiirebi =

Nigeria TV show

- The 3 presenters of the TV show in a group photo at the studio
- Genre: Talk show
- Created by: Africa Magic
- Presented by: Damilola Oni; Bamidele Fagboyo; Feyikemi Agbola
- Country of origin: Nigeria
- Original language: Yoruba
- No. of seasons: 13
- No. of episodes: 301

Production
- Producer: Leye Fabusoro
- Production location: Ibadan
- Running time: 30 minutes

Original release
- Network: Africa Magic Yoruba
- Release: 2014 – present

Aajiirebi is a Nigerian magazine breakfast show hosted by the duo of Damilola Oni and Bamidele Fagboyo on DSTV and GOtv in Yoruba language. The first season of the show began airing in 2014 and the thirteenth season is currently on air.

Aajiirebi is a pre-recorded 30-minute educative and entertainment talk show being aired on Africa Magic Yoruba which focus on discussions on societal and cultural issues in contemporary Nigeria and African society directed by Tunde Oladimeji and produced by Leye Fabusoro. The show consist of the interview segment and Anike Kilonsele corner hosted by Feyikemi Agbola in which useful and practical tips on everyday living is shared.
