= 2025 FIFA Club World Cup Group H =

Soccer tournament group stage

Group H was one of eight groups in the 2025 FIFA Club World Cup, an international club soccer tournament hosted in the United States and organized by FIFA. It comprised four teams: Real Madrid of Spain; Al Hilal of Saudi Arabia; Pachuca of Mexico; and Red Bull Salzburg of Austria. Teams qualified by winning the respective continental club championships of their confederation or through a ranking of their performance in competitions. Only two clubs per country were allowed to qualify unless three or four won their respective continental club championship. The 2025 edition of the FIFA Club World Cup was the first in the tournament's history to be played under its quadrennial format with 32 teams. The group's matches began on June 18 and concluded on June 26.

== Teams ==
The four teams in Group H were decided by the FIFA Club World Cup draw held by FIFA on December 5, 2024, in the Miami area. The 32 participants were divided into four pots based on their confederation and ranking within FIFA's club ranking system. Each of the eight groups would receive one team from each pot. Teams from the same confederation could not be drawn into the same group except for those from UEFA, which had twelve slots; teams from the same national association were not able to be drawn into the same group.

2025 FIFA Club World Cup Group H draw
Draw position	Team	Association	Pot	Confederation	Method of qualification	Date of qualification	Appearance	Last appearance	Previous best performance
H1	Real Madrid	Spain	1	UEFA	Winners of the 2021–22 UEFA Champions League	March 14, 2023 (Note: Qualification was confirmed on this date by FIFA.)	7th	2022	Winners (2014, 2016, 2017, 2018, 2022)
H2	Al Hilal	Saudi Arabia	3	AFC	Winners of the 2021 AFC Champions League	March 14, 2023	4th	2022	Runners-up (2022)
H3	Pachuca	Mexico	4	CONCACAF	Winners of the 2024 CONCACAF Champions Cup	May 31, 2024	5th	2017	Third place (2017)
H4	Red Bull Salzburg	Austria	2	UEFA	UEFA four-year ranking (9th among eligible)	April 17, 2024	1st	—N/a	—N/a

== Standings ==
Pos	Team	Pld	W	D	L	GF	GA	GD	Pts	Qualification
1	(Spain) Real Madrid	3	2	1	0	7	2	+5	7	Advance to knockout stage
2	(Saudi Arabia) Al Hilal	3	1	2	0	3	1	+2	5	Advance to knockout stage
3	(Austria) Red Bull Salzburg	3	1	1	1	2	4	−2	4	
4	(Mexico) Pachuca	3	0	0	3	2	7	−5	0	

Source: FIFA
Rules for classification: Group stage tiebreakers

In the round of 16:

- The winners of Group H, Real Madrid, advanced to play the runners-up of Group G, Juventus.
- The runners-up of Group H, Al Hilal, advanced to play the winners of Group G, Manchester City.

== Matches ==
Matches took place from June 18 to 26. All times listed are local.

=== Real Madrid vs Al Hilal ===
June 18, 2025
3:00 pm EDT

Real Madrid (Spain)	1–1	(Saudi Arabia) Al Hilal
G. García 34'	Report	Neves 41' (pen.)

Hard Rock Stadium, Miami Gardens
Attendance: 62,415
Referee: Facundo Tello (Argentina)

Real Madrid	Al Hilal

GK	1	(Belgium) Thibaut Courtois
RB	12	(England) Trent Alexander-Arnold		(substituted off) 65'
CB	24	(Spain) Dean Huijsen
CB	35	(Spain) Raúl Asencio		(substituted off) 46'
LB	20	(Spain) Fran García
CM	14	(France) Aurélien Tchouaméni
CM	8	(Uruguay) Federico Valverde (c)
AM	5	(England) Jude Bellingham		(substituted off) 84'
RF	11	(Brazil) Rodrygo		(substituted off) 65'
CF	30	(Spain) Gonzalo García
LF	7	(Brazil) Vinícius Júnior	(yellow card) 15'	(substituted off) 80'
Substitutions:
MF	15	(Turkey) Arda Güler		(substituted on) 46'
DF	17	(Spain) Lucas Vázquez		(substituted on) 65'
FW	21	(Morocco) Brahim Díaz		(substituted on) 65'
MF	44	(Spain) Víctor Muñoz		(substituted on) 80'
MF	10	(Croatia) Luka Modrić		(substituted on) 84'
Manager:
(Spain) Xabi Alonso

GK	37	(Morocco) Yassine Bounou
RB	20	(Portugal) João Cancelo		(substituted off) 64'
CB	87	(Saudi Arabia) Hassan Al-Tombakti
CB	3	(Senegal) Kalidou Koulibaly
LB	6	(Brazil) Renan Lodi		(substituted off) 83'
DM	8	(Portugal) Rúben Neves	(yellow card) 89'
CM	22	(Serbia) Sergej Milinković-Savić
CM	29	(Saudi Arabia) Salem Al-Dawsari (c)
RF	77	(Brazil) Malcom		(substituted off) 64'
CF	11	(Brazil) Marcos Leonardo		(substituted off) 83'
LF	16	(Saudi Arabia) Nasser Al-Dawsari		(substituted off) 76'
Substitutions:
MF	15	(Saudi Arabia) Mohammed Al-Qahtani	(yellow card) 90+1'	(substituted on) 64'
DF	88	(Saudi Arabia) Hamad Al-Yami		(substituted on) 64'
MF	28	(Saudi Arabia) Mohamed Kanno		(substituted on) 76'
DF	24	(Saudi Arabia) Moteb Al-Harbi	(yellow card) 90+9'	(substituted on) 83'
MF	18	(Saudi Arabia) Musab Al-Juwayr		(substituted on) 83'
Manager:
(Italy) Simone Inzaghi

Man of the Match:
Gonzalo García (Real Madrid)

Assistant referees:
Juan Pablo Belatti (Argentina)
Gabriel Chade (Argentina)
Fourth official:
César Ramos (Mexico)
Video assistant referee:
Leodán González (Uruguay)
Assistant video assistant referee:
Hernán Mastrángelo (Argentina)
Support video assistant referee:
Tatiana Guzmán (Nicaragua)

=== Pachuca vs Red Bull Salzburg ===
At 7:13 pm EDT, in the 54th minute, the match was interrupted due to adverse weather conditions. The match was resumed at 8:50 pm EDT.

June 18, 2025
6:00 pm EDT

Pachuca (Mexico)	1–2	(Austria) Red Bull Salzburg
González 56'	Report	Gloukh 42'; Onisiwo 76'

TQL Stadium, Cincinnati
Attendance: 5,282
Referee: Mustapha Ghorbal (Algeria)

Pachuca	Red Bull Salzburg

GK	25	(Mexico) Carlos Moreno
RB	24	(Mexico) Luis Rodríguez
CB	4	(Brazil) Eduardo Bauermann
CB	16	(Uruguay) Federico Pereira	(yellow card) 75'
LB	8	(Mexico) Bryan González
CM	28	(Mexico) Elías Montiel		(substituted off) 88'
CM	5	(Mexico) Pedro Pedraza		(substituted off) 55'
RW	12	(Mexico) Alexéi Domínguez		(substituted off) 88'
AM	18	(Argentina) Agustín Palavecino		(substituted off) 77'
LW	29	(Brazil) Kenedy		(substituted off) 77'
CF	23	(Venezuela) Salomón Rondón (c)
Substitutions:
FW	10	(Brazil) John Kennedy		(substituted on) 55'
MF	6	(Uruguay) Santiago Homenchenko		(substituted on) 77'
MF	26	(Mexico) Alan Bautista		(substituted on) 77'
DF	14	(Mexico) Carlos Sánchez		(substituted on) 88'
FW	30	(Colombia) Avilés Hurtado		(substituted on) 88'
Manager:
(Mexico) Jaime Lozano

GK	52	(Austria) Christian Zawieschitzky
RB	22	(Austria) Stefan Lainer
CB	23	(France) Joane Gadou
CB	2	(Denmark) Jacob Rasmussen
LB	13	(Germany) Frans Krätzig	(substituted off) 88'
RM	45	(Mali) Dorgeles Nene
CM	18	(Denmark) Mads Bidstrup (c)
CM	38	(Austria) Valentin Sulzbacher	(substituted off) 55'
LM	30	(Israel) Oscar Gloukh	(substituted off) 79'
CF	20	(Ghana) Edmund Baidoo	(substituted off) 55'
CF	21	(Serbia) Petar Ratkov	(substituted off) 55'
Substitutions:
FW	9	(Austria) Karim Onisiwo	(substituted on) 55'
FW	11	(Belgium) Yorbe Vertessen	(substituted on) 55'
MF	5	(Mali) Soumaila Diabate	(substituted on) 55'
FW	28	(Denmark) Adam Daghim	(substituted on) 79'
DF	36	(Sweden) John Mellberg	(substituted on) 88'
Manager:
(Germany) Thomas Letsch

Man of the Match:
Oscar Gloukh (Red Bull Salzburg)

Assistant referees:
Mokrane Gourari (Algeria)
Abbes Akram Zerhouni (Algeria)
Fourth official:
Mutaz Ibrahim (Libya)
Video assistant referee:
Hamza Al-Fariq (Morocco)
Assistant video assistant referee:
Mahmoud Ashour (Egypt)
Support video assistant referee:
Tomasz Kwiatkowski (Poland)

=== Real Madrid vs Pachuca ===
June 22, 2025
3:00 pm EDT

Real Madrid (Spain)	3–1	(Mexico) Pachuca
Bellingham 35'; Güler 43'; Valverde 70'	Report	Montiel 80'

Bank of America Stadium, Charlotte
Attendance: 70,248
Referee: Ramon Abatti (Brazil)

Real Madrid	Pachuca

GK	1	(Belgium) Thibaut Courtois
RB	12	(England) Trent Alexander-Arnold		(substituted off) 78'
CB	35	(Spain) Raúl Asencio	(red card) 7'
CB	24	(Spain) Dean Huijsen
LB	20	(Spain) Fran García
DM	14	(France) Aurélien Tchouaméni
CM	15	(Turkey) Arda Güler		(substituted off) 60'
CM	5	(England) Jude Bellingham		(substituted off) 60'
RF	8	(Uruguay) Federico Valverde (c)
CF	30	(Spain) Gonzalo García		(substituted off) 46'
LF	7	(Brazil) Vinícius Júnior		(substituted off) 87'
Substitutions:
FW	21	(Morocco) Brahim Díaz		(substituted on) 46'
MF	19	(Spain) Dani Ceballos		(substituted on) 60'
MF	10	(Croatia) Luka Modrić		(substituted on) 60'
DF	22	(Germany) Antonio Rüdiger		(substituted on) 78'
MF	44	(Spain) Víctor Muñoz		(substituted on) 87'
Manager:
(Spain) Xabi Alonso

GK	25	(Mexico) Carlos Moreno
RB	24	(Mexico) Luis Rodríguez		(substituted off) 60'
CB	4	(Brazil) Eduardo Bauermann
CB	16	(Uruguay) Federico Pereira
LB	8	(Mexico) Bryan González
CM	28	(Mexico) Elías Montiel
CM	26	(Mexico) Alan Bautista		(substituted off) 46'
RW	12	(Mexico) Alexéi Domínguez		(substituted off) 46'
AM	18	(Argentina) Agustín Palavecino	(yellow card) 18'	(substituted off) 72'
LW	29	(Brazil) Kenedy		(substituted off) 60'
CF	23	(Venezuela) Salomón Rondón (c)
Substitutions:
DF	22	(Argentina) Gustavo Cabral		(substituted on) 46'
FW	10	(Brazil) John Kennedy		(substituted on) 46'
MF	19	(Mexico) Javier Eduardo López		(substituted on) 60'
DF	14	(Mexico) Carlos Sánchez		(substituted on) 60'
MF	32	(Mexico) Víctor Guzmán		(substituted on) 72'
Manager:
(Mexico) Jaime Lozano

Man of the Match:
Jude Bellingham (Real Madrid)

Assistant referees:
Danilo Manis (Brazil)
Rafael Alves (Brazil)
Fourth official:
Espen Eskås (Norway)
Video assistant referee:
Hernán Mastrángelo (Argentina)
Assistant video assistant referee:
Juan Lara (Chile)
Support video assistant referee:
Marco Di Bello (Italy)

=== Red Bull Salzburg vs Al Hilal ===
June 22, 2025
6:00 pm EDT

Red Bull Salzburg (Austria)	0–0	(Saudi Arabia) Al Hilal
	Report

Audi Field, Washington, D.C.
Attendance: 16,167
Referee: Wilton Sampaio (Brazil)

Red Bull Salzburg	Al Hilal

GK	52	(Austria) Christian Zawieschitzky
RB	22	(Austria) Stefan Lainer
CB	23	(France) Joane Gadou
CB	2	(Denmark) Jacob Rasmussen
LB	13	(Germany) Frans Krätzig
RM	45	(Mali) Dorgeles Nene		(substituted off) 77'
CM	18	(Denmark) Mads Bidstrup (c)
CM	5	(Mali) Soumaila Diabate	(yellow card) 36'	(substituted off) 46'
LM	30	(Israel) Oscar Gloukh		(substituted off) 65'
CF	20	(Ghana) Edmund Baidoo		(substituted off) 77'
CF	9	(Austria) Karim Onisiwo		(substituted off) 65'
Substitutions:
DF	36	(Sweden) John Mellberg		(substituted on) 46'
FW	28	(Denmark) Adam Daghim		(substituted on) 65'
FW	8	(Japan) Sōta Kitano	(yellow card) 85'	(substituted on) 65'
MF	14	(Denmark) Maurits Kjærgaard		(substituted on) 77'
FW	11	(Belgium) Yorbe Vertessen		(substituted on) 77'
Manager:
(Germany) Thomas Letsch

GK	37	(Morocco) Yassine Bounou
RB	20	(Portugal) João Cancelo	(substituted off) 80'
CB	87	(Saudi Arabia) Hassan Al-Tombakti	(substituted off) 89'
CB	3	(Senegal) Kalidou Koulibaly
LB	6	(Brazil) Renan Lodi	(substituted off) 89'
DM	8	(Portugal) Rúben Neves
CM	22	(Serbia) Sergej Milinković-Savić
CM	16	(Saudi Arabia) Nasser Al-Dawsari	(substituted off) 89'
RF	77	(Brazil) Malcom	(substituted off) 68'
CF	11	(Brazil) Marcos Leonardo
LF	29	(Saudi Arabia) Salem Al-Dawsari (c)
Substitutions:
MF	28	(Saudi Arabia) Mohamed Kanno	(substituted on) 68'
DF	88	(Saudi Arabia) Hamad Al-Yami	(substituted on) 80'
DF	24	(Saudi Arabia) Moteb Al-Harbi	(substituted on) 89'
DF	78	(Saudi Arabia) Ali Lajami	(substituted on) 89'
MF	18	(Saudi Arabia) Musab Al-Juwayr	(substituted on) 89'
Manager:
(Italy) Simone Inzaghi

Man of the Match:
Yassine Bounou (Al Hilal)

Assistant referees:
Bruno Boschilia (Brazil)
Bruno Pires (Brazil)
Fourth official:
Jean-Jacques Ndala (DR Congo)
Video assistant referee:
Nicolás Gallo (Colombia)
Assistant video assistant referee:
Armando Villarreal (United States)
Support video assistant referee:
Bram Van Driessche (Belgium)

=== Al Hilal vs Pachuca ===
June 26, 2025
8:00 pm CDT

Al Hilal (Saudi Arabia)	2–0	(Mexico) Pachuca
S. Al-Dawsari 22'; Marcos Leonardo 90+5'	Report

Geodis Park, Nashville
Attendance: 14,147
Referee: Danny Makkelie (Netherlands)

Al Hilal	Pachuca

GK	37	(Morocco) Yassine Bounou
RB	20	(Portugal) João Cancelo		(substituted off) 86'
CB	87	(Saudi Arabia) Hassan Al-Tombakti		(substituted off) 76'
CB	3	(Senegal) Kalidou Koulibaly	(yellow card) 52'
LB	6	(Brazil) Renan Lodi	(yellow card) 45+4'	(substituted off) 71'
DM	8	(Portugal) Rúben Neves
CM	22	(Serbia) Sergej Milinković-Savić
CM	16	(Saudi Arabia) Nasser Al-Dawsari
RF	77	(Brazil) Malcom		(substituted off) 86'
CF	11	(Brazil) Marcos Leonardo
LF	29	(Saudi Arabia) Salem Al-Dawsari (c)		(substituted off) 76'
Substitutions:
DF	24	(Saudi Arabia) Moteb Al-Harbi		(substituted on) 71'
MF	28	(Saudi Arabia) Mohamed Kanno		(substituted on) 76'
DF	78	(Saudi Arabia) Ali Lajami		(substituted on) 76'
DF	88	(Saudi Arabia) Hamad Al-Yami		(substituted on) 86'
MF	18	(Saudi Arabia) Musab Al-Juwayr		(substituted on) 86'
Manager:
(Italy) Simone Inzaghi

GK	13	(Mexico) Sebastián Jurado
CB	4	(Brazil) Eduardo Bauermann
CB	2	(Argentina) Sergio Barreto	(yellow card) 17'	(substituted off) 56'
CB	16	(Uruguay) Federico Pereira
RM	14	(Mexico) Carlos Sánchez		(substituted off) 77'
CM	28	(Mexico) Elías Montiel
CM	18	(Argentina) Agustín Palavecino		(substituted off) 77'
LM	3	(Mexico) Alonso Aceves
RF	12	(Mexico) Alexéi Domínguez	(yellow card) 45+1'	(substituted off) 56'
CF	23	(Venezuela) Salomón Rondón (c)
LF	29	(Brazil) Kenedy		(substituted off) 63'
Substitutions:
DF	8	(Mexico) Bryan González		(substituted on) 56'
FW	30	(Colombia) Avilés Hurtado		(substituted on) 56'
MF	26	(Mexico) Alan Bautista		(substituted on) 63'
FW	9	(Mexico) Illian Hernández		(substituted on) 77'
MF	5	(Mexico) Pedro Pedraza		(substituted on) 77'
Manager:
(Mexico) Jaime Lozano

Man of the Match:
Salem Al-Dawsari (Al Hilal)

Assistant referees:
Hessel Steegstra (Netherlands)
Jan de Vries (Netherlands)
Fourth official:
Jean-Jacques Ndala (DR Congo)
Video assistant referee:
Rob Dieperink (Netherlands)
Assistant video assistant referee:
Marco Di Bello (Italy)
Support video assistant referee:
Tomasz Kwiatkowski (Poland)

=== Red Bull Salzburg vs Real Madrid ===
June 26, 2025
9:00 pm EDT

Red Bull Salzburg (Austria)	0–3	(Spain) Real Madrid
	Report	Vinícius 40'; Valverde 45+3'; G. García 84'

Lincoln Financial Field, Philadelphia
Attendance: 64,811
Referee: Dahane Beida (Mauritania)

Red Bull Salzburg	Real Madrid

GK	52	(Austria) Christian Zawieschitzky
RB	22	(Austria) Stefan Lainer (c)
CB	23	(France) Joane Gadou
CB	2	(Denmark) Jacob Rasmussen
LB	13	(Germany) Frans Krätzig
RM	45	(Mali) Dorgeles Nene	(substituted off) 89'
CM	5	(Mali) Soumaila Diabate	(substituted off) 73'
CM	15	(Mali) Mamady Diambou	(substituted off) 46'
LM	30	(Israel) Oscar Gloukh
CF	20	(Ghana) Edmund Baidoo	(substituted off) 89'
CF	21	(Serbia) Petar Ratkov	(substituted off) 46'
Substitutions:
MF	14	(Denmark) Maurits Kjærgaard	(substituted on) 46'
FW	28	(Denmark) Adam Daghim	(substituted on) 46'
FW	11	(Belgium) Yorbe Vertessen	(substituted on) 73'
DF	6	(Austria) Samson Baidoo	(substituted on) 89'
FW	9	(Austria) Karim Onisiwo	(substituted on) 89'
Manager:
(Germany) Thomas Letsch

GK	1	(Belgium) Thibaut Courtois
CB	22	(Germany) Antonio Rüdiger	(substituted off) 66'
CB	14	(France) Aurélien Tchouaméni
CB	24	(Spain) Dean Huijsen
RM	12	(England) Trent Alexander-Arnold
CM	8	(Uruguay) Federico Valverde (c)	(substituted off) 74'
CM	15	(Turkey) Arda Güler	(substituted off) 66'
LM	20	(Spain) Fran García
RF	5	(England) Jude Bellingham	(substituted off) 82'
CF	30	(Spain) Gonzalo García
LF	7	(Brazil) Vinícius Júnior	(substituted off) 66'
Substitutions:
MF	10	(Croatia) Luka Modrić	(substituted on) 66'
FW	11	(Brazil) Rodrygo	(substituted on) 66'
DF	31	(Spain) Jacobo Ramón	(substituted on) 66'
MF	19	(Spain) Dani Ceballos	(substituted on) 74'
FW	21	(Morocco) Brahim Díaz	(substituted on) 82'
Manager:
(Spain) Xabi Alonso

Man of the Match:
Vinícius Júnior (Real Madrid)

Assistant referees:
Jerson Emiliano dos Santos (Angola)
Stephen Yiembe (Kenya)
Fourth official:
Ma Ning (China)
Video assistant referee:
Ivan Bebek (Croatia)
Assistant video assistant referee:
Hamza Al-Fariq (Morocco)
Support video assistant referee:
Bastian Dankert (Germany)

== Discipline ==
Fair play points would have been used as tiebreakers if the overall and head-to-head records of teams were tied. These were calculated based on yellow and red cards received in all group matches as follows:

- first yellow card: −1 point;
- indirect red card (second yellow card): −3 points;
- direct red card: −4 points;
- yellow card and direct red card: −5 points;

Only one of the above deductions was applied to a player in a single match.

Team	Match 1				Match 2				Match 3				Points
Team	Yellow card	(yellow card) (yellow-red card)	Red card	(yellow card) (red card)	Yellow card	(yellow card) (yellow-red card)	Red card	(yellow card) (red card)	Yellow card	(yellow card) (yellow-red card)	Red card	(yellow card) (red card)	Points
(Austria) Red Bull Salzburg					2								−2
(Mexico) Pachuca	1				1				2				−4
(Spain) Real Madrid	1						1						−5
(Saudi Arabia) Al Hilal	3								2				−5
