= Halita =

Nigerian drama series

- Genre: Drama
- Directed by: Dimbo Atiya, Paul Apel Papel
- Theme music composer: Bez
- Original languages: English; Hausa
- No. of seasons: 2
- No. of episodes: 240

Production
- Executive producer: Dimbo Atiya
- Production locations: Abuja, Jos, Nigeria
- Camera setup: Multi camera
- Running time: 30 minutes

Original release
- Network: DStv Family channel 154; GOtv channel 2
- Release: 4 February 2019 – 2019

Halita is a Nigerian drama series set in Northern Nigeria. It has Chisom Gabriella in the leading role as the eponymous Halita and also stars Ummi Ahmed, Boma Ilamina-Eremie and Eddie Madaki. It premiered on Africa Magic Family, DStv channel 154 and GOtv channel 2 on 4 February 2019.

== Plot summary ==
Halita is the story of a 19-year-old village girl who is forced to leave the village in order to send money home when her mother Rebecca, takes ill. She is promised a job as a secretary but by fate, she ends up in the Zamani home and her fortunes take a turn.

== Cast and characters ==
- Chisom Gabriella Agoawuike as Halita
- Ummi Ahmed as Matilda Rishante
- Boma Ilamina-Eremie as Sarki 'King' Zamani
- Bassey Ekpo Bassey as Kaza Zamani
- David Adoga as Bobai Zamani
- Patrick Otoro as Dabot, Halita’s father
- Tosan Edremoda Ugbeye as Uwani Rishante
- Mofe Duncan as Adi Rishante
- Eddie Madaki as Hassan
- Onyinye Ezekwe as Dosha Zamani
- Matt Alkali as Dareng
- Sophie Alakija as Altine

== Production and release ==
At a media screening of the first episode in Lagos, the Channel Director of Africa Magic described Halita as a tale of family, fortune and fame. It streams on Showmax and was listed as one of the most streamed shows of 2020.

Matt Alkali died while filming on set on 24 March 2020.
