= Dimbo Atiya =

Nigerian actress and producer (died 2026)

- Died: c. 6 August 2026
- Citizenship: Nigerian
- Occupations: Producer; director
- Known for: Halita; Sons of the Caliphate
- Family: Karachi Atiya (wife)
- Awards: 2022 Africa Magic Viewers' Choice Awards Best Africa Magic Original Drama Series

Dimbo Atiya (died c. 6 August 2026) was a Nigerian Nollywood film producer and director from Nasarawa state. In 2022, he won the 2022 AMVCA Best Africa Magic Original Drama Series category award with the drama series Halita he produced, beating six other contestants.

== Life and career ==
Atiya started out studying urban and regional planning but soon realised that his passion lay elsewhere.

In 2008, Atiya had his first stint at a major project, taking the reins of Naija Diamonds. In the same year, he was nominated for the British Council's International Young Entrepreneur Awards and was subsequently awarded a scholarship to attend Creative Lives, a development programme at the Lagos Business School powered by the British Council. It was at this programme Atiya met his wife, Karachi.

He decided to enroll at the New York Film Academy in 2012, taking professional courses in film making and production at the Academy's campuses in New York and California.

Atiya produced over 500 episodes of television shows and five feature films. Atiya also undertook photography work for the London Theatre and was at some point, head of photography for online shopping brand Konga.com.

He served as co-creator, executive producer, producer, co-writer and director of The Rishantes, a drama series on Africa Magic and Showmax. The show was nominated for and won the 2022 Africa Magic Viewers' Choice Awards for Best Africa Magic Original Drama Series.

Atiya's death was announced on 6 August 2026.

== Works ==
As producer, director, and writer

- Drawing Strength (2019)
- Still Falling (season 2; 2021)
- The Plan (TV miniseries; 2023)

As producer and director

- Halita (season 1/2, 239 episodes; 2019–2021)
- Dala Dala (2023)

As director

- Sons of the Caliphate (25 episodes; 2016–2018)

As writer

- Fillo (2019)
