= Mutaz Ibrahim =

Libyan football referee (born 1990)

- Full name: Mutaz Ibrahim
- Born: 7 March 1990 (age 36); Libya

Domestic
Years	League	Role
??–present	Libyan Premier League	Referee

International
Years	League	Role
2019–present	FIFA	Referee
??–present	CAF	Referee

Mutaz Ibrahim (born 7 March 1990) is a Libyan football referee, who has been a FIFA-listed international referee since 2019.

== Career ==
At club level, Ibrahim oversaw the 2023 CAF Champions League final first leg between Al Ahly SC (Egypt) and Wydad AC (Morocco) in Cairo. Ibrahim refereed the 2024 CAF Super Cup in September 2024, at the Kingdom Arena, in Riyadh, Saudi Arabia. The game was played between Egyptian teams Al Ahly SC and Zamalek SC, with a Zamalek victory on penalties.

In national team competitions, Ibrahim was selected as Libya's representative for the 2023 FIFA U-17 World Cup in Indonesia, where he refereed two group-stage matches: Group E's France v. South Korea, and the Group F's victory of Venezuela over New Zealand.

The next year, Ibrahim was chosen for the 2023 Africa Cup of Nations in the Ivory Coast, where he oversaw four matches: two group-stage ones, one round-of-16 match (Mali v. Burkina Faso), and a semifinal between the locals and DR Congo. In 2023, Ibrahim led matches at the African Nations Championship in Algeria.

Other international tournaments for Ibrahim were the 2021 U-20 Africa Cup of Nations in Mauritania and games of the CAF qualification for the 2022 FIFA World Cup and the 2026 FIFA World Cup.

In 2024, Ibrahim was chosen as CAF Men's Referee of the Year.

Among his most recent tournaments was the 2025 FIFA Club World Cup in the United States, serving as a reserve referee. He served as VAR official at the Group C match between Bayern Munich and Auckland City FC (which ended 10–0 for the Germans), and at the Group H game between Mexican team Pachuca and Austrians Red Bull Salzburg, ended in a victory 2–1 for the Europeans.
