= M-Net Family =

- Country: South Africa
- Broadcast area: Sub Saharan Africa
- Network: M-Net
- Headquarters: Johannesburg

Programming
- Language(s): English
- Picture format: 1080i HDTV (downscaled to 16:9 576i for the SDTV feed)

Ownership
- Owner: MultiChoice
- Sister channels: M-Net; 1max; Abol TV; Africa Magic; Akwaaba Magic; Channel O; SuperSport; KykNET; Maisha Magic; M-Net Movies; Mzansi Magic; Zambezi Magic

History
- Launched: October 2007
- Closed: March 31, 2017
- Former names: MagicWorld (until July 1, 2015)

Availability

Terrestrial
- DStv: Channel 162

Streaming media
- DStv App

M-Net Family was a digital satellite television general entertainment channel produced for DStv by M-Net. Initially launched as Magic World, the channel used to simulcast programs from other M-Net channels, and later went on to broadcast reruns of shows that were previously on other M-Net channels.

== History ==
The channel was launched as MagicWorld in 2007, following the closure of M-Net's Open Time Prime Time block to retain viewership of popular programs previously available in this slot. Aimed at providing an affordable television service for families, DStv introduced a new pay-TV package for low-income households, initially branded as M-Net Lite.

Over time, the channel transitioned into a general entertainment platform with a stronger focus on African entertainment. The channel was constantly repositioned to fit in with other M-Net brands, but failed to draw significant viewership due to its low picture quality.

In 2015, MagicWorld was rebranded as M-Net Family in an attempt to improve ratings. However, despite a refreshed lineup, the channel was discontinued in 2017 due to declining viewership. Much of its programming was integrated into the now-defunct Vuzu.

== Programming ==
MagicWorld’s programming initially included a mix of reruns, simulcasts and first-run shows from M-Net and Channel O. Its prime-time schedule featured popular African-produced movies and series, and reruns of international content first seen on M-Net.

After 2009, MagicWorld began simulcasting V Entertainment from Vuzu and offered highlights or full episodes of reality shows like "Idols" and "Big Brother Africa." Other notable programming included reruns of the Kenyan talk show "The Patricia Show" and "All Africa Poker," which aired during late-night hours.

After its rebranding as M-Net Family, the channel featured family-orientated series and movies, reruns of M-Net originals such as The Wild, international talk shows, and a children's programming block from the defunct kids channel Koowee.
