= TBN Africa =

- Country: South Africa
- Broadcast area: Africa
- Headquarters: Sandton, Johannesburg

Programming
- Language: English

Ownership
- Owner: Trinity Broadcasting Network

History
- Launched: 4 March 2016; 10 years ago

Links
- Website: tbnafrica.org

TBN Africa is a South African pan-African Christian television channel owned by the Trinity Broadcasting Network. It was created in 2015 following the sale of TBN's previous business in South Africa, dating back to Ciskei, to the Faith Broadcasting Network. It started broadcasting on 4 March 2016, using the licence and the infrastructure used by the Rhema Network.

== History ==
TBN had been operating in Africa since the mid-1980s, with the launch of TBN Ciskei in 1986, operating under the former bantustan of Ciskei from its capital Bhisho, and even requesting the SABC to use a spare transmitter network to carry a national service, which was contested with Pat Robertson's CBN. The measure was controversial due to the United States' stance on the apartheid regime of the time. After apartheid ended, TBN Ciskei shut down and restarted as TBN Ciskei - East London after moving to the adjacent municipality, broadcasting a terrestrial UHF service since 1997. The channel was subsequently launched nationwide on the DStv platform in May 2002.

On 1 November 2014, TBN left its existing partnership, following a dispute on the installation of a US$1 million roof at its East London facilities using money donated from TBN's international unit TBNI. Andre Roebert, upon discovering that he rejected a "detailed financial analysis", opted to end the partnership and renamed his channel Faith Broadcasting Network. Paul Crouch was critical of Roebert's actions and terminated all relations with TBN.

Following the events at the newly rebranded Faith Broadcasting Network, TBN initiated a new broadcasting strategy for Africa. In early 2015, it began negotiations with Rhema Ministries to sign an agreement to use its infrastructure to beam TBN Africa, at the expense of Rhema Network's license. This agreement implied the inclusion of Rhema's programming in the new channel, as well as working with South African and Namibian pastors. Consequently, the new TBN Africa began on 4 March 2016.

On 15 January 2019, Loyiso Bala, already a presenter since launch, was appointed its director of programming. On 4 March, the channel started airing Zuri, a talk show hosted by Ayanda-Allie Paine covering topics such as submission and celibacy. Bala left the channel in April 2021, subsequently marking his exit from broadcasting. That year, for Easter, it launched a pop-up channel, Hope TV.
