= Africa Magic =

Collection of pay TV entertainment channels

- Africa Magic logo
- Broadcast area: Sub-Saharan Africa
- Headquarters: Nigeria

Programming
- Languages: English, Swahili, Hausa, Yoruba, Igbo
- Picture format: 576i (SDTV, 16:9) - Terrestrial, 576i (SDTV, 16:9) - DStv, 1080i (HDTV, 16:9) - DStv

Ownership
- Owner: MultiChoice (Canal+ S.A.)
- Sister channels: M-Net; Vuzu (closed); Supersport; Channel O Mzansi Magic; KykNET; Akwaaba Magic; Pearl Magic; Me; 1Magic (closed); 1Max

History
- Launched: 14 July 2003; 23 years ago

Links
- Website: Africa Magic

Availability

Terrestrial
- GOtv: Channel 6 (Africa Magic Epic); Channel 7 (Africa Magic+); Channel 8 (Africa Magic Showcase)
- DStv: Channel 151 (Africa Magic Showcase; Channel 152 (Africa Magic Epic); Channel 154 (Africa Magic+); Channel 156 (Africa Magic Hausa); Channel 157 (Africa Magic Yoruba); Channel 159 (Africa Magic Igbo)

Africa Magic is a collection of Pay TV entertainment channels that focus on African programming, most popularly Nigerian series and movies. Africa Magic, which started off as single channel of the same name, is a brand owned by M-Net and now comprises seven channels.

== History ==
Africa Magic was launched in July 2003 as a movie and general entertainment channel geared at showcasing Nollywood talent and African culture and couture. At the time of its launch it received high popularity amongst DStv subscribers, especially in South Africa and Nigeria. Thus the launching of a sister channel, Africa Magic Plus, was made possible. The two channels went on another brand identity and over the next decade, the brand expanded to include seven more channels comprising movies, television shows and general entertainment. Africa Magic broadcasts in more than 50 African countries. The channels include Africa Magic+, Africa Magic Showcase, Africa Magic Yoruba, Africa Magic Igbo, Africa Magic Hausa and Africa Magic Epic. Africa Magic is also responsible for the annual Africa Magic Viewers' Choice Awards (AMVCAs), the biggest celebration of film and television talent in Africa.

== Africa Magic's original programmes ==
- Aajiirebi
- Africa's Next Top Model
- Before 30
- 53 Extra
- Jara
- Highlites with IK
- Stargist
- Big Brother Africa
- Tinsel
- The Johnsons
- Hotel Majestic
- Jacob's Cross
- Do Good
- Hush
- Battleground
- Jemeji
- The Voice Nigeria
- My Flatmates
- Kona
- Big Brother Naija
- Forbidden
- Ajoche
- The Eve
- Riona
- Enakhe
- Unmarried (Nigeria)
- Halita
- Hustle
- Battleground

== Stations ==
Africa Magic started out as a single Nollywood channel which gained popularity from Multichoice's biggest revenue generators, South Africa and Nigeria, the reason why Africa Magic plus was launched. These were later renamed along with the creation of new channels. In 2017, Its rerun channel, Africa Magic World was discontinued due to lack of viewership.

=== Africa Magic Showcase ===
Africa Magic Showcase
- Africa Magic Showcase logo

Ownership
- Owner: Multichoice

History
- Former names: Africa Magic Plus (2003–2012); Africa Magic Entertainment (2012–2014)

Previously Africa Magic Plus then Africa Magic Entertainment. The premium tier channel showing first-run original series, reality shows and latest nollywood movie premiers.

=== Africa Magic Urban ===
Africa Magic Urban
- Africa Magic Urban logo

Ownership
- Owner: Multichoice

History
- Launched: 2012
- Closed: 30 April 2024; 2 years ago
- Former names: Africa Magic Movies 1 (2012–2014); Africa Magic Urban Movies (2014 - 16 March 2015)

Africa Magic Urban was previously Africa Magic Movies 1. It is contemporary lifestyle entertainment channel with predominantly movies and talk shows, as well as series from Mzansi Magic. The channel dropped the word 'Movies' in March 2015. It ceased operations on 30 April 2024.

=== Africa Magic Epic ===
Africa Magic Epic
- Africa Magic Epic logo

Ownership
- Owner: Multichoice

History
- Launched: 2012
- Former names: Africa Magic Movies (2012-5 August 2014); Africa Magic Epic Movies (2014–2016)

Previously Africa Magic Movies (until 2014) and Africa Magic Epic Movies (until 2016). A channel inspired by Africa's traditional roots with movies and series depicting cultural aspects.

=== Africa Magic+ ===
Africa Magic+
- Africa Magic Family logo

Ownership
- Owner: Multichoice

History
- Former names: Africa Magic (2003–2014); Africa Magic Family (2014–2026)

The parent Africa Magic channel serving family-oriented programs. Africa Magic Family was rebranded to Africa Magic+ on Thursday 5th November 2026, providing the same Africa Magic content plus extra additions.

=== Regional channels ===
Africa Magic Hausa
Programming
- Language: Hausa

Ownership
- Owner: Multichoice

History
- Launched: 2010

Africa Magic Yoruba
Programming
- Language: Yoruba

Ownership
- Owner: Multichoice

History
- Launched: 2010

Africa Magic Igbo
Programming
- Language: Igbo

Ownership
- Owner: Multichoice

History
- Launched: 2 April 2015

- Africa Magic Hausa – Movies and series broadcast in Hausa
- Africa Magic Yoruba –Movies and series broadcast in Yoruba
- Africa Magic Igbo – Movies and series broadcast in Igbo

=== Affiliates ===
These are channels affiliated to the Africa Magic and share most of the programs, which are independently sourced from their respective regions. Content from these channels are either displayed in their original soundtrack or dubbed in English.

- Maisha Magic – Formerly Africa Magic Swahili. A group of channels catering for the East African diaspora. Has four dedicated entertainment channels, Maisha Magic Plus and Maisha Magic Loko from Kenya; Maisha Magic Bongo and Maisha Magic POA from Tanzania.
- Kwenda Magic – A Portuguese-inspired channel serving Angola.
- Maningue Magic - A Portuguese-curated channel dedicated for audiences in Mozambique.
- Zambezi Magic – Channel catering for Southern African nations such as Zambia, Malawi, Zimbabwe and Botswana. It primarily carries original drama series and content from Mzansi Magic. It also has a minor sister channel called OneZed broadcasting repeats of programming carried by Zambezi Magic.
- Pearl Magic – Channel serving the Ugandan diaspora. Divided into two channels: Pearl Magic Prime and Pearl Magic.
- Mzansi Magic – Channel that broadcasts South African series. Many of their programs are shown on Africa Magic Showcase. Has a sister channel called Wethu+ that carries content from former Mzansi channels (Wethu, Bioskop, Music) as well as two PSL matches and international movies.
- Akwaaba Magic - Channel serving Ghanaian audiences
- Abol TV - Channel created for Amharic speaking audiences. Based in Ethiopia and also has a sister network in Abol Maaddii.

=== Defunct services ===
- Africa Magic World – Channel derived from MagicWorld. Played mostly reruns. Closed 30 April 2017 due to lack of viewership.
- Africa Magic Go – Subscription-based Video-on-demand service available to users outside Africa. Closed 30 November 2015.[2]

== Africa Magic Viewers' Choice Awards ==
The Africa Magic Viewers' Choice Awards (AMVCA) is an annual accolade presented by Multichoice recognizing outstanding achievement in television and film. The inaugural Africa Magic Viewers' Choice Awards ceremony was held in Lagos, Lagos State in Nigeria on 9 March 2013, and was broadcast live in more than 50 countries. Entries into the award ceremony are films and TV series that have been aired in the previous year.

== In other uses ==
- Veteran OAP, Olisa Adibua refers to Omotola Jalade Ekeinde as "the real Africa Magic" during the annual AMVCA ceremony.
