= GOtv =

Paid TV satellite service in Africa

- Type: Public company
- Industry: Pay television
- Founded: 5 September 2011; 15 years ago
- Headquarters: Nigeria, South Africa
- Area served: Sub-Saharan Africa
- Products: Terrestrial television
- Services: Television
- Owners: Canal+ S.A.
- Website: gotvafrica.com

GOtv is a pay television terrestrial service in sub-Saharan Africa owned by broadcaster MultiChoice and launched on 5 September 2011. It mainly consists of African and international programming.

== History ==
The terrestrial TV service was founded in 2011 by MultiChoice. It employs the DVB-T2 standard in the countries it operates. The first countries to receive the service were Uganda, Zambia and Kenya (provided in co-operation with the Kenya Broadcasting Corporation) and was seen as a cheaper alternative to the satellite-based DStv packages.

GOtv began operations with the following channels: Africa Magic Plus, Style Network, BBC World, Channel O, Magic World, Nickelodeon, SuperSport Select, Al Jazeera, Disney Junior, Daystar, TBN, One Gospel, Discovery World, e.tv Africa and E! Entertainment

Currently, GOtv features news channels such as the BBC, Al Jazeera and CNN, sports channels such as SuperSport and ESPN, local & international content from Africa Magic and M-Net Movies among others, including free-to-air channels. It is currently available in Nigeria, Kenya, Namibia, Ghana, Malawi, Zambia, Mozambique and Uganda.

GOtv formerly had operations in South Africa, Zimbabwe and Rwanda.

=== Acquisition by Canal+ S.A. ===
Nearly a year later, on February 1, 2024, Canal+ made an offer to MultiChoice's investors to acquire remaining shares, subject to regulatory approval, offering a price of R105 per share, 40% higher than the price of R75 offered the previous day. MultiChoice rejected the offer believing it undervalued the company and following a reprimand by the Takeover Regulation Panel, Canal+ revised its offer and upped its bid to R125 per share, the share price was 67% higher than the MultiChoice share price.

In June 2024, Canal+ Group and MultiChoice released a joint circular with the French broadcaster that has obtained 45.2% of company shares with an interim board approving on the revised offer. Both companies made a filing to local regulators in September 2024 with the terms of the agreement remaining unchanged.

Under the deal, Canal+ will spin out MultiChoice SA's broadcasting licence which includes DStv as an independent entity to comply with the Electronic Communications Act, which prohibits foreign entities from owning more than 20%. New shareholders set to enter the transaction include Former Telkom's CEO Sipho Maseko's Afrifund Investment and businesswoman Sonja De Bruyn's Identity Partners that will form the entity known as LicenceCo to handle the operations in South Africa and give it 51% economic interest with the remaining 49% for Canal+.

== Packages ==
GOtv has services in eight countries (Ghana, Kenya, Malawi, Mozambique, Namibia, Nigeria, Uganda, and Zambia). On 5th November 2026, GOtv unveiled four new packages in Sub-Saharan Africa (Sports, Select, Starter and Easy)

Other packages offered in Sub-Saharan African nations include Movies & Series in Namibia; Essential and Lite in Mozambique.
