= TBN Ciskei =

TBN Ciskei was a television station broadcasting from Bhisho, capital of the former bantustan of Ciskei and the first international affiliate of the US fundamentalist network Trinity Broadcasting Network. The station also had plans to expand into South Africa in the late 1980s. It continued to exist after the cessation of Ciskei as TBN Ciskei - East London, receiving a separate licence in 1997, subsequently becoming a continental channel in 2002.

== History ==
In December 1985, Paul Crouch, founder of TBN, applied for a television licence with the Cabinet of Ciskei. Broadcasts began at some stage in 1986, as a private operation, after receiving five acres of land from the Ciskei government. All programming was produced by the main TBN station in the United States, but the local government received a free airtime window.

In December 1986, Ciskei officials visited California to take part in the Praise the Lord telethon, using a South African passport.

In late 1988, Paul Crouch applied for a potential national television licence to cover all of South Africa, using a spare VHF frequency from the SABC and even held talks with the Dutch Reformed Church. Other Christian broadcasters, such as Pat Robertson's Christian Broadcasting Network, were also interested in using the frequency. This was seen with skepticism from South African authorities as it could violate US sanctions imposed on South Africa in 1987; TBN also planned to set up new stations in other bantustans.

=== Aftermath ===
With the end of apartheid, the bantustans were reintegrated into core South African territory. The Trinity Broadcasting Network moved from Bhisho (capital of the new province of Eastern Cape) and moved to the adjacent East London, where it applied for a series of four-year licences beginning in 1997, to deliver TBN locally as a community television station. By 2015-2016, it was one of the few community television stations in operation in South Africa, and from 2016, became TBN Africa, using the existing East London facilities as its operating base. The original TBN Africa was subsequently detached from the wider TBN network in 2014, becoming Faith Broadcasting Network.
