= Carlos Sánchez (footballer, born 2002) =

Mexican footballer (born 2002)

Personal information
- Full name: Carlos Adrián Sánchez Nava
- Date of birth: 13 April 2002 (age 24)
- Place of birth: Cuautla, Morelos, Mexico
- Height: 1.65 m (5 ft 5 in)
- Position: Full-back

Team information
- Current team: Pachuca
- Number: 14

Youth career
- 2018–2020: Pachuca

Senior career*
Years	Team	Apps	(Gls)
2020–	Pachuca	73	(2)
2021–2023	→ Zacatecas (loan)	42	(2)
2021–2022	→ Fresnillo (loan)	16	(2)
- * Club domestic league appearances and goals as of 3 October 2026

Carlos Adrián Sánchez Nava (born 13 April 2002) is a Mexican professional footballer who plays as a full-back for Liga MX club Pachuca.

== Club career ==
=== Zacatecas / Fresnillo ===
Sánchez began his career in the academy of Pachuca, before being loaned to Zacatecas, where he eventually made his professional debut on 23 February 2021 in a 0–4 loss to Tampico Madero, being subbed in at the 73rd minute. Afterwards, he was loaned to Fresnillo.

=== Pachuca ===
On 13 January 2024, Sánchez returned to Pachuca, making his debut for the team on 29 March in a 1–3 loss to UNAM.

== Career statistics ==
=== Club ===
As of 3 October 2026

Club	Season	League			Cup		Continental		Intercontinental		Other		Total	
Club	Season	Division	Apps	Goals	Apps	Goals	Apps	Goals	Apps	Goals	Apps	Goals	Apps	Goals
Zacatecas	2020–21	Liga de Expansión MX	1	0	—		—		—		—		1	0
Zacatecas	2022–23	Liga de Expansión MX	25	2	—		—		—		—		25	2
Zacatecas	2023–24	Liga de Expansión MX	16	0	—		—		—		—		16	0
Zacatecas	Total		42	2	—		—		—		—		42	2
Fresnillo (loan)	2021–22	Serie A	16	2	—		—		—		—		16	2
Pachuca	2023–24	Liga MX	11	0	—		1 (Note: Appearances in CONCACAF Champions Cup)	0	—		—		12	0
Pachuca	2024–25	Liga MX	25	1	—		—		1 (Note: Appearance in FIFA Intercontinental Cup)	0	2 (Note: Appearances in Leagues Cup)	0	28	1
Pachuca	2025–26	Liga MX	28	1	—		—		3 (Note: Appearance in FIFA Club World Cup)	0	3	0	34	1
Pachuca	2026–27	Liga MX	9	0	—		—		—		2	0	11	0
Pachuca	Total		73	2	—		1	0	4	0	7	0	75	2
Career total			115	6	0	0	1	0	4	0	7	0	127	6
