= Zambezi Magic =

African TV channel

- Country: Botswana; Eswatini; Malawi; Lesotho; Namibia; Zambia; Zimbabwe
- Broadcast area: Southern Africa
- Network: DStv

Programming
- Language(s): Multilingual

Ownership
- Owner: MultiChoice (Canal+ S.A.)

History
- Launched: 1 July 2015; 10 years ago

Availability

Terrestrial
- DStv: Channel 162

Zambezi Magic is a 24-hour African general entertainment channel created by MultiChoice for DStv. It is one of M-Net's local interest channels catering for Zambian, Zimbabwean, Botswana, Eswatini, Malawi, Lesotho and Namibian audiences.

== History ==
The channel was launched on the 1st of July 2015 on DStv channel 160, after Multichoice Zambia made a call to local content producers for local productions. According to DStv Zambia the channel was created to target the Southern African viewers.

Initially, the channel was not available in South Africa and the channels line up consisted of South African productions from the SABC and M-Net's various channels, which gave the impression that the channel is an offering that caters to DStv subscribers who have been illegally subscribing to South African bouquets. Zambezi Magic has been known to produce Zambian soaps like Mpali and telenovelas like Zuba which is the first Zambian telenovela that aired on Zambezi Magic.

In April 2019, Zambezi Magic moved to DStv channel 162 and was also launched on the E36 satellite to make the channel available to a broader Southern African viewers.
