= Chinonso Arubayi =

Nigerian actress

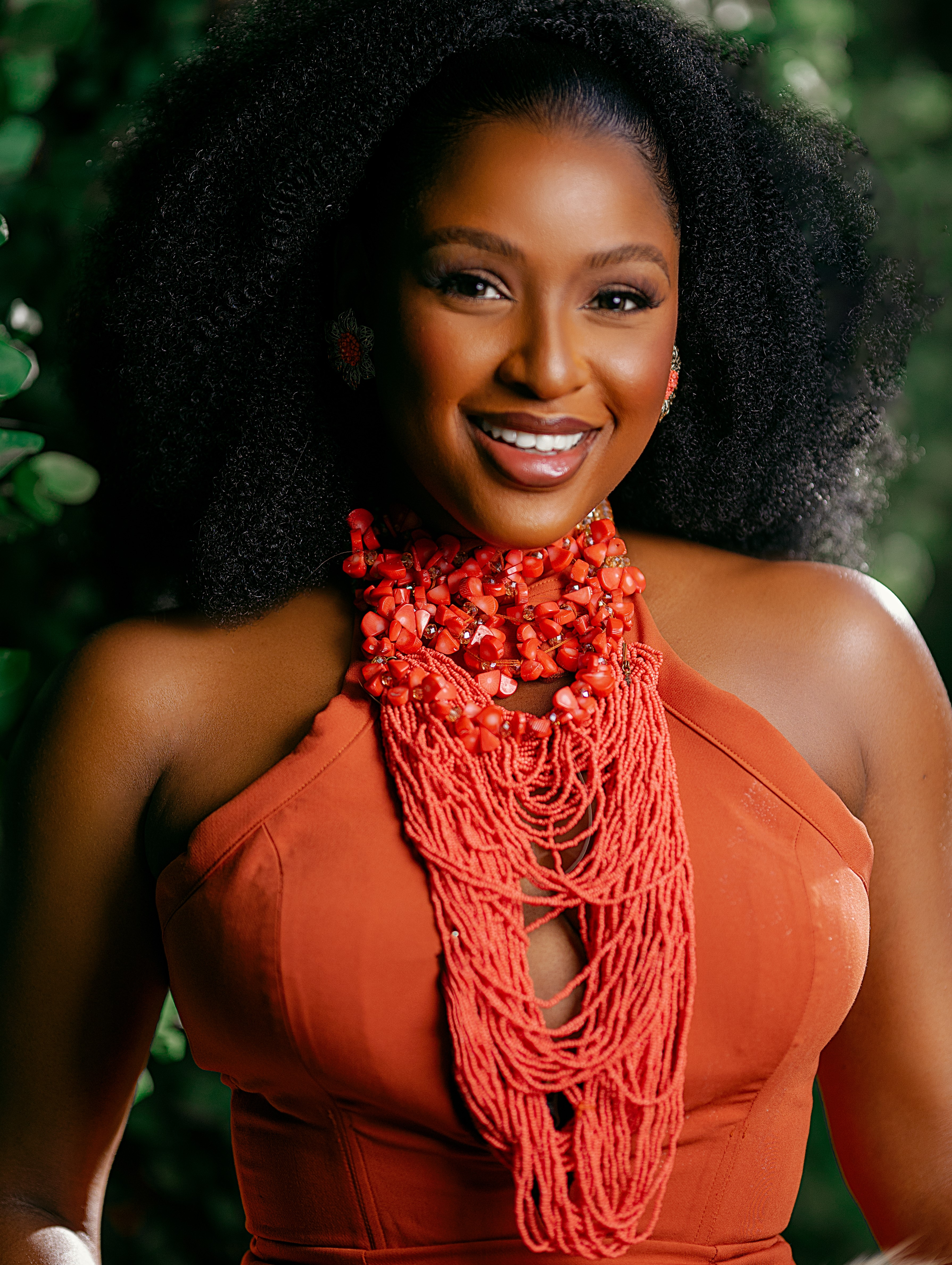
- Born: Chinonso Ngozi Ijomah; Warri, Nigeria
- Citizenship: Nigeria
- Education: Nnamdi Azikiwe University
- Occupations: Actress; Television presenter; Film producer; Model
- Years active: 2014–present
- Known for: My Flatmates (TV series); Lockdown; I am Nazzy; Rumour Has It (Season3)

Chinonso Arubayi is a Nigerian film and television actress, television presenter, film and television producer and model. She is best known for her roles in My Flatmates, Rumour Has It and her film production debut, I Am Nazzy alongside IK Ogbonna and Jidekene Achufusi. She is also known for her time hosting the Urban Kitchen Show.

== Early life ==
Chinonso Arubayi was born in Warri, a town in Delta state, in southern Nigeria. She grew in up in Lagos, and is of Igbo heritage, from Awka, in Anambra state, where she graduated with a degree in mass communication from Nnamdi Azikiwe University. While at the university, she was a presenter on the campus radio station. In 2005, Arubayi won the Miss Teen Nigeria title.

== Career ==
Arubayi began her acting career as a day player on M-Net television series, The Johnsons in 2014. She then began writing and producing for Consolidated Media Associates, owners of Soundcity, Trybe TV and Spice TV on the shows, On The Couch, Project Swan, You’ve Got Issues and a few others.

In 2018, Arubayi enrolled in the School of Media Studies, at the Pan Atlantic University, where she studied the business of filmmaking for film producers. She had a big break in 2020, when she played a lead role in Mary Remmy Njoku's feature film production, Beyond Pardon. She has since featured in several notable films and television series, including, Ndani TV's Rumour Has It, My Flatmates, Crazy Grannies, Lockdown, Loving Amanda, Survivors and others.

In 2018, she began hosting the Filmhouse TV Show and was later unveiled as the host of the popular cooking show, Urban Kitchen, which she hosted for two seasons.

In April 2022, Arubayi released her debut film production, I Am Nazzy. The film was directed by Kayode Peters and featured Jimmy Odukoya, Denrele Edun and IK Ogbonna.

Her performance, as the lead character on Africa Magic TV's original series, Sisi Eko received commendation from fans and critics.

== Personal life ==
Arubayi was married to Nigerian gospel singer Eric Arubayi in 2014 until his death in 2017. They have a son together named Jayden.

== Awards and recognition ==
In August 2021, Arubayi received a nomination for Next-Rated Actress of the Year at the Africa Choice Awards, alongside other nominees from Ghana and South Africa. In February 2023, she received the award for Distinguished Actress of the Year at the Nigerian Women Achievers Awards.

Year	Award	Category	Note	Ref
2021	Africa Choice Awards	Next-Rated Actress of the Year	Nominated	
2023	Nigeria Women Achievers Awards	Distinguished Actress of the Year	Won	

== Filmography ==
=== Feature films ===
- I am Nazzy (2021)
- Survivors
- Lockdown
- Crazy Grannies
- Loving Amanda
- Warmth in Despair
- Zizani
- Deathly Obsession
- Oches Secret
- Beyond Pardon
- 3 Can Play
- Clandestine Consequences
- Mustapha (ROK Original film)
- Friends Only
- 3 Brides
- Killing Eva
- Fated to Love
- Grim
- All We Ever Wanted
- The Real Us
- Frozen Smile
- 3 Brothers
- A Lonely Star
- Muntu
- Denial
- Gifted (ROK Original film)
- Fantasy
- It's Complicated
- Keeping Daniella
- Oh! No Santa
- Love Struck
- Staged
- I Met a Girl

=== TV series ===
- Dilemma
- Sisi Eko
- Rumour Has it (NDANI TV Original series)
- My Flatmates (Africa Magic Original series)
- Manfriend (Africa Magic Original series)
