= Odukoya =

- Language: Yoruba

Origin
- Region of origin: West Africa

Odukoya is Yoruba surname. Notable people with the surname include:

- Abiodun Odukoya, Nigerian-German singer
- Bimbo Odukoya, Nigerian pastor and tele evangelist
- Taiwo Odukoya, Nigerian pastor
- Thomas Odukoya, Dutch/Nigerian football player
- Jimmy Odukoya, Nigerian pastor and Actor
