= Greensprings School =

British international school in Lagos, Nigeria

Coordinates: 6.4624288°N 3.69536284°E

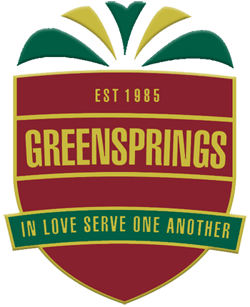
Greensprings School, Lagos. Current logo (2010-present)

Greensprings School is a British international private school in Nigeria. It was established in the year 1985, in Anthony Village, Lagos. It currently operates on the Anthony, Lekki and Ikoyi campuses. The school's offers include Crèche, Preschool, Elementary School, Secondary School and Sixth Form (the International Baccalaureate curriculum).

== History ==
The school started as a Montessori school in January 1985, with just three pupils, in the heart of Lagos mainland. It was established by Olayiwola Koiki for the purpose of providing qualitative education for her child because she believed no school at that time in the area was up to par. Due to this belief, she travelled to the United Kingdom to study at the St. Nicholas Montessori Training Centre and returned to Nigeria between 1984 and early 1985 to establish the school.

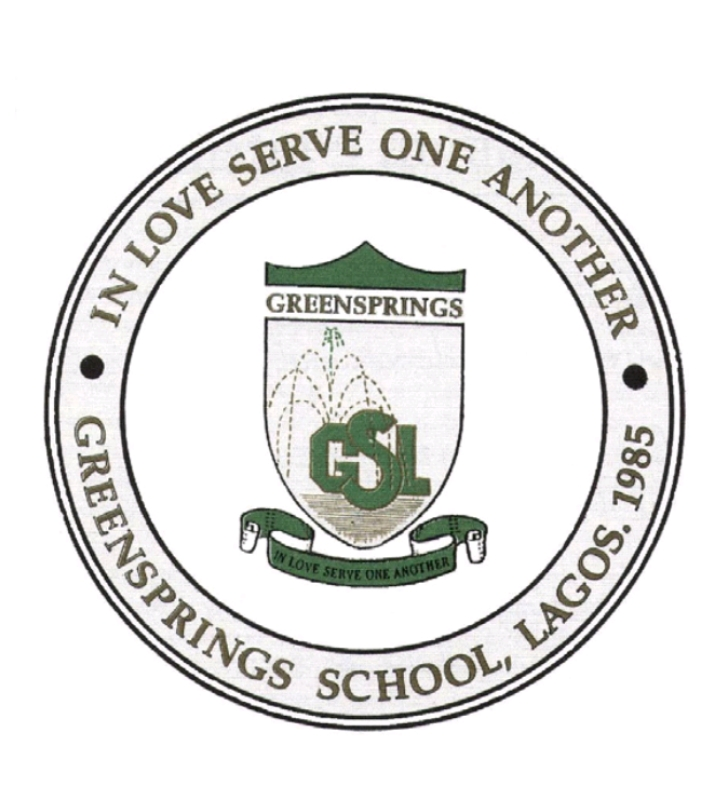
Greensprings School, Lagos Logo (1985-2010)

She obtained some land at Olatunde Ayoola Avenue, Anthony, Lagos in late 1984 and began some renovation work on the compound. On 21 January 1985 she opened the doors of the school to three students, two of whom were her sister's children. The school began to grow in leaps and bounds, and its fame began to go widespread in the country for its quality of service in education.

The secondary school was then established as soon as the first elementary school graduation was through, to cater for the post-primary education of the individuals. Its first Head Boy was Jimi Odukoya, son of Taiwo and Bimbo Odukoya and Senior Pastor of The Fountain of Life Church, Lagos.

The school logo received a change in early 2010, accompanying its image rebrand as a growing community rather than just a prestigious institution, its development of the Lekki campus and its 25th anniversary.

Today, the school now has three campuses in Lagos, with a population of over 3,500 students. The school is governed by a Board of Governors, with its executive director being the founder, Mrs. Lai Koiki.

== Fees ==
The school is regarded as expensive.

== List of heads of school (Lekki Campus) ==
- 2005–2007: Mr. Howard Bullock
- 2008–2010: Mrs. Maeve Stevenson
- 2010–2016: Mr. Harry McFaul
- 2016–2019: Mrs. Bola Kolade
- 2019–present: Mrs. Feyisara Ojugo
