= Tiannah's Empire =

Nigerian TV show

- Genre: Reality Television
- Directed by: Priscilla Nzirimo-Nwanah
- Starring: Toyin Lawani-Adebayo; Lord Maine
- Country of origin: Nigeria
- Original languages: English; Yoruba
- No. of seasons: 2
- No. of episodes: 20

Production
- Executive producer: Mo Abudu
- Production locations: Lagos, Nigeria
- Camera setup: Multiple
- Running time: 30 minutes
- Production company: EbonyLife Studios

Original release
- Network: Ebonylife TV; EbonyLife On
- Release: 22 April 2017 – 12 September 2018

Tiannah's Empire is a Nigerian reality television series that premiered on 22 April 2017, on Ebonylife TV, starring Toyin Lawani-Adebayo (best known as Toyin Lawani), and Oluwatenola Jermaine Womandi. The show focused on Toyin Lawani, as she juggles the many roles she plays in 30 different businesses and being a mum of two kids, Tiannah and Tenor.; from mother to stylist, to designer, to a friend.

== Casting ==
In Season 1, Episode 2, Seyi Shay, and Skuki makes an appearance on the show. In Season 1, Episode 3, Ben Murray-Bruce makes an appearance on the show. In Season 1, Episode 5, Florence Ita Giwa makes an appearance on the show. In Season 1, Episode 6, Emmanuel Ikubese makes an appearance on the show. In Season 1, Episode 9, Denrele Edun makes an appearance on the show. In Season 1, Episode 10 and 11, Annie Macaulay-Idibia makes an appearance on the show.

Cast members from Tiannah’s Empire
Cast	Seasons	
Cast	1	2
Toyin Lawani-Adebayo	Main	Main
Oluwatenola Jermaine Womandi	Main	Main
Tiannah's Empire Clients/Friends
Denrele Edun	Recurring	
Seyi Shay	Recurring	
Skuki	Recurring	
Florence Ita Giwa	Recurring	
Annie Macaulay-Idibia	Recurring	
Emmanuel Ikubese	Recurring	

== Episodes ==
Series	Episodes	Originally released	
Series	Episodes	First released	Last released
1	13	22 April 2017	28 November 2017
2	7	1 August 2018	12 September 2018

=== Season 1 (2017) ===
No. overall	No. in series	Title	Original release date	Viewers (millions)
1	1	"Episode 1"	22 April 2017	N/A
2	2	"Episode 2"	29 April 2017	N/A
3	3	"Episode 3"	4 May 2017	N/A
4	4	"Episode 4"	11 May 2017	N/A
Lawani won the ELOY entrepreneur of the year award and the best stylist at the Bold Awards event. She also spoke about breaking into the international fashion market. According to her, she already has the likes of Ray J and Soulja Boy wearing her piece abroad.
5	5	"Episode 5"	17 May 2017	N/A
6	6	"Episode 6"	27 May 2017	N/A
7	7	"Episode 7"	5 June 2017	N/A
8	8	"Episode 8"	9 June 2017	N/A
9	9	"Episode 9"	21 June 2017	N/A
10	10	"Episode 10"	29 June 2017	N/A
11	11	"Episode 11"	29 June 2017	N/A
12	12	"Episode 12"	21 November 2017	N/A
13	13	"Episode 13"	28 November 2017	N/A

=== Season 2 (2018) ===
No. overall	No. in series	Title	Original release date	Viewers (millions)
14	1	"Episode 1"	1 August 2018	N/A
15	2	"Episode 2"	8 August 2018	N/A
16	3	"Episode 3"	15 August 2018	N/A
17	4	"Episode 4"	22 August 2018	N/A
18	5	"Episode 5"	29 August 2018	N/A
19	6	"Episode 6"	5 September 2018	N/A
20	7	"Episode 7"	12 September 2018	N/A

== Production ==
The reality television series was produced by EbonyLife Studios, and distributed by EbonyLife Films. The series was produced and directed by Priscilla Nzirimo-Nwanah. The show was executive produced by Mo Abudu, and premiered on EbonyLife On, an online movie streaming television network, on 2 August 2018.
