= Cynthia Nwadiora =

Nigerian lawyer and actress

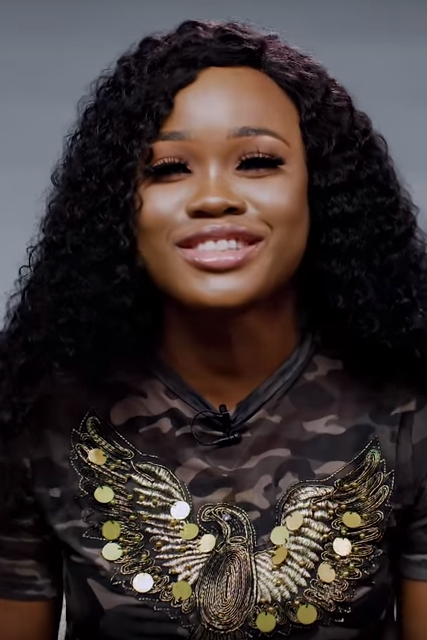
- Cee-C in 2019
- Born: Cynthia Nwadiora; 6 November 1992 (age 34); Enugu, Nigeria
- Other name: Cee-C
- Education: Madonna University (Nigeria)
- Occupations: Lawyer; actress; model; reality television personality
- Years active: 2014–present
- Television: Big Brother Nigeria; Fake Liars; True Colour
- Modeling information
- Height: 5 ft 2 in (157 cm)
- Hair color: Black
- Eye color: Dark Brown

Cynthia Nwadiora (born 6 November 1992), popularly known as Cee-C, is a Nigerian lawyer, actress, model and reality television personality. She appeared as a housemate on the shows Big Brother Naija season 3 and Big Brother Naija season 8. She won the award for Fashion Influencer of the Year at the La Mode Magazine's Green October Event 2018. She has served as a brand ambassador for the fitness brand GetFit.

== Early life and education ==
Cynthia Nwadiora was born in Enugu State but hails from Ozubulu, Anambra State, Nigeria. She attended Federal Government Girls College in Ibusa, Delta State, where she completed her secondary education. She studied law at Madonna University, Okija.

== Career ==
Nwadiora joined the reality show Big Brother Naija season 3, and also appeared in the reality show Ndani TGIF Show. She has served as a brand ambassador for the eyewear company House of Lunettes, the real estate technology company OxfordBuildBay, the fitness brand GetFit, and the beverage company Amstel Malta. She made her Nollywood acting debut in the film Fake Liars alongside Broda Shaggi.

== Big Brother Naija ==
In 2018, Nwadiora was one of the five finalists of Big Brother Naija season 3, alongside Alex Asogwa, Miracle Igbokwe, Tobi Bakre and Chinonso Nina. She finished as the runner-up.

In July 2023, she returned as a housemate in the eighth season, Big Brother Naija: All Stars. She was evicted on 1 October 2023, finishing in third place behind Mercy Eke.

== Filmography ==
=== Television ===
Year	Title	Role	Notes	Status
2018	Big Brother Naija 3	Contestant	Reality Show Game Show	2nd Place
2023	Big Brother Naija 8 All Stars	Contestant	Reality Show Game Show	3rd Place

=== Films ===
Year	Title	Role(s)	Notes	Ref.
2023	True Colour	Mrs Davis	Nigerian film	

== Awards and nominations ==
Year	Event	Category	Result	Ref
2018	La Mode Magazine's Green October Awards	Fashion Influencer of the Year	Won	
2018	Social Media Awards	Brand Influencer and Discovery of the year	Won	
2018	ELOY Awards	Social Media Personality of The Year	Won	
2019	ELOY Awards	ELOY Award for Influence	Won	

== See also ==
- List of Nigerian actresses
