= Manfriend =

Nigerian TV series

- Genre: Drama
- Written by: Stephanie Dadet (HW.); Fatima Binta Gimsay; Uchenna Ugwu; Tariux Akhere; Bubbles
- Directed by: Amanze Abara; Uche Ikejimba
- Starring: Kunle Coker; Zainab Popoola; Chinonso Arubayi; Adetola Jones; Martha Ehinome; Raymond Adeka; Venita Akpofure; Frankincense Eche-Ben; Rotimi Adelegan
- Country of origin: Nigeria
- Original language: English
- No. of seasons: 1
- No. of episodes: 13

Production
- Executive producer: Uche Ikejimba
- Editor: Jolomi Odokuma
- Running time: 24–25 minutes
- Production company: Blink Africa

Original release
- Network: Africa Magic
- Release: 5 January 2024 – present

Manfriend, is a 2024 Africa Magic Original Nigeria television drama, executively produced by Uche Ikejimba, and starring Kunle Coker, Zainab Popoola, Chinonso Arubayi, Adetola Jones, Martha Ehinome, Raymond Adeka, Venita Akpofure, Frankincense Eche-Ben, and Rotimi Adelegan.

== Plot ==
Manfriend tells the story of the Kings, following the fallout of their parents Tersoo and Wandoo, who reunite as secret lovers.

== Cast ==
=== Main ===
- Kunle Coker - Tersoo King
- Zainab Popoola - Wandoo King
- Chinonso Arubayi - Dooshima King
- Adetola Jones - Doosur King
- Martha Ehinome - Mimidoo King
- Raymond Adeka - TAJ
- Venita Akpofure - Tessy
- Frankiscense Eche Ben - Dr Obi
- Rotimi Adelegan - Segun

=== Supporting ===
- Omobola Akinde - Aunty Shadee
- May Anne - Aunty Oge
- Eniola Elizabeth - Marie
- Marian Osioh - Ivie

== Episode ==
Season	Episodes	Originally released	
Season	Episodes	First released	Last released
1	13	January 5, 2024	March 29, 2024

=== Season 1 (2024) ===
No.	Title	Original release date
1	TBA	5 January 2024
Welcome to the chaotic lives of the King's family.
2	TBA	12 January 2024
Wandoo reacts to the news of Tersoo's engagement. Dooshima reveals where her money really goes to. Doosuur becomes a bone of contention and Wandoo makes a decision.
3	TBA	19 January 2024
Doosuur goes through it as she devises ways of meeting up Wandoo's incredible request.
4	TBA	26 January 2024
Aftermath of Wandoo's encounter with Obi. Dooshima gives succor to the one she loves.
5	TBA	2 February 2024
Dooshima's canadian plans hang. Doosuur unleashes on Dooshima. Obi and Wandoo walk into trouble.
6	TBA	9 February 2024
Dooshima stalks her runaway lover and also reveals a big secret.
7	TBA	16 February 2024
Dooshima tells her mum a big lie. Doosur has a "bestie" moment with Taj. Mimidoo communicates with her lover.
8	TBA	23 February 2024
Tersoo discovers Obi. Doosuur avoids Taj.
9	TBA	1 March 2024
Secrets are uncovered as Doosuur has dejavu with Wandoo. Tersoo makes an unusual request from Obi.
10	TBA	8 March 2024
Tersoo confronts obi about dating Wandoo, while Doosuurs little secret is about to be uncovered.
11	TBA	15 March 2024
Mimidoo gives her family a shock when she introduces her mystery boyfriend. Taj demands honesty from Doosuur.
12	TBA	22 March 2024
Taj insists on honesty from Doosuur, while Mimidoo surprises her family by her revelations, causing unexpected reactions.
13	TBA	29 March 2024
Dooshima speaks out against her father's neglect and infidelity, revealing a deep-seated rift within the family.

== Release ==
On 4 January 2024, Africa Magic announced "Manfriend" as 1 of its 4 TV programs to start the new year.

== Broadcast history ==
The TV series premiered on 5 January 2024 on Africa Magic Showcase and Showmax.
