= Fate of Alakada =

2020 Nigerian action comedy film

- Promotional poster
- Directed by: Kayode Kasum
- Written by: Moshood Yakubu Olawale; Ozioma Ogbaji
- Produced by: Toyin Abraham
- Starring: Toyin Abraham; Broda Shaggi; Mercy Eke
- Production companies: Toyin Abraham Productions; FilmOne Productions
- Distributed by: FilmOne Entertainment
- Release date: 1 October 2020
- Running time: 110 minutes
- Country: Nigeria
- Languages: English; Yoruba
- Box office: ₦113.2 million

Fate of Alakada: The Party Planner also known as Fate of Alakada is a 2020 Nigerian action comedy film written by Moshood Yakubu Olawale and Ozioma Ogbaji, and directed by Kayode Kasum. The film stars Toyin Abraham, Mercy Eke and Broda Shaggi in the lead roles. This was the fifth film in the Alakada franchise and it was also the sequel to the 2017 comedy film Alakada Reloaded. The film is based on poking fun at social media fakeness and the current Nigerian pop culture. The film had its theatrical release on 1 October 2020 coinciding with the Independence Day of Nigeria and opened to extremely positive reviews. It also became a box office success and also eventually became the highest grossing Nigerian film of 2020.

== Synopsis ==
Yetunde, a woman with an inferiority complex and hailing from a simple background, indulges in the act of fabricating stories regarding her financial and social status through social media to fit in with the crème de la crème.

== Cast ==
- Toyin Abraham as Yetunde
- Broda Shaggi as Kas
- Mercy Eke as herself
- MC Lively
- Stephanie Coker
- Mabel Makun as herself
- Odunlade Adekola
- Alex Asogwa as herself
- Timini Egbuson as Ochuko
- Toyin Lawani
- Abiri Oluwabusayo as Jane
- Davido
- Peruzzi

== Production ==
Film producer and actress Toyin Abraham announced her plan regarding making of a sequel to Alakada Reloaded (2017) in an Instagram post on 28 November 2019. It was also taunted to be the fourth film in the Alakada film series after Alakada (2009), Alakada 2 (2013) and Alakada Reloaded (2017). The principal photography of the film commenced on 16 December 2019.

Nigerian television show host Stephanie Coker, 4th season of Big Brother Naija winner Mercy Eke and fashion designer and entrepreneur Toyin Lawani all made their film acting debuts through this film. Popular Instagram influencer Broda Shaggi also landed a pivotal role in the film. The first look poster of the film was unveiled in February 2020.

== Release ==
The film was initially supposed to have its theatrical release on 10 April 2020 but the release was postponed to 1 October 2020 due to the COVID-19 pandemic induced lockdown. The film was released in limited seating capacity in Lagos with only 33% allocated to operate and 50% in other states by the Government of Nigeria.

It started streaming on Netflix on 5 March 2021.

== Box office ==
The film collected over ₦28 million within just four days despite the restricted seating capacity due to the COVID-19. The film grossed ₦17,396,200 in the first nine days after its release. It grossed over ₦30 million in its opening weekend and it was depicted as a major feat by the film critics considering the COVID-19 uncertainties and it also became one of only fa ew Nigerian films to have grossed ₦20 million in the opening weekend in the Cinema of Nigeria. It also became the highest -rossing Nigerian film in an opening weekend post the lockdown. The final box office collection of the film stood at ₦112,149,600 and went ont o become the highest -rossing Nigerian film in 2020. The film also became 14th highest grossing Nigerian film of all-time.

== Controversy ==
The lead actress of the film Toyin Abraham was severely criticised and slammed in the social media for promoting the film via Twitter in October 2020 amid the End SARS nationwide protests. She was also criticised for not taking part in the movement and instead was seen promoting the film.
