= Abiri Oluwabusayo =

Nigerian reality TV personality and actress (born 1993)

- Born: Abiri Oluwabusayo Victoria; 29 October 1993 (age 33); Lagos State
- Other name: KokobyKhloe
- Education: Tai Solarin University of Education
- Occupations: TV personality; actress; entrepreneur; model; compere
- Years active: 2016–present
- Television: Big Brother Nigeria; Fate of Alakada
- Modeling information
- Height: 5 ft 7 in (170 cm)
- Hair color: Black
- Eye color: Black

Abiri Oluwabusayo Victoria (born October 29, 1993), known professionally as Khloe or KokobyKhloe, is a Nigerian reality TV star, model, brand influencer, actress, and entrepreneur inducted into the Forbes 30 Under 30 class of 2023.

She rose to fame after participating in the 2018 edition of Big Brother Naija season 3, where she was among the top 10 finalists and the first contestant to be recalled to the house after eviction. She is also known for her roles in Nollywood's Fate of Alakada and Pepper Soup.

== Early life and education ==
Oluwabusayo was born and raised in Lagos State, Nigeria, and hails from Ayegbaju and Ikole Ekiti, in Ekiti State. She attended Uppermost Nursery and Primary School and completed her secondary schooling at Lagos State Model College Meiran. She then obtained a diploma in business administration from Kings Polytechnic, and also a B.Ed. and B.Sc. in accounting from Tai Solarin University of Education. Oluwabusayo developed an interest in fashion and entertainment at the age of nine.

== Career ==
Before entering the public eye, Oluwabusayo worked as a fashion designer and model, participating in various beauty pageants and competitions, including as a finalist at Miss Global Nigeria in 2013.

On 28 January 2018, she appeared as a contestant on Big Brother Naija season 3, where she emerged as one of the top 10 finalists. She also became the first contestant to be recalled to the house after eviction, a move that stirred mixed reactions from viewers.

In 2019, Oluwabusayo hosted a red carpet event for the Lagos Fashion Fair.

In 2020, Oluwabusayo was featured in the Toyin Abraham-produced Nigerian action comedy film titled Fate of Alakada.

She is also the founder of the fashion brand KokobyKhloe Beauty, a venture that earned her a place on the 2023 Forbes 30 Under 30 Tomorrow's Titans; Heart And Hustle.

== Filmography ==
=== Television ===
Year	Title	Role	Notes	Status
2018	Big Brother Naija 3	Contestant	Reality show / game show	10th Place

=== Films ===
Year	Title	Role	Notes
2016	Pepper Soup	Herself	also starring Denrele Edun, Layole Oyatogun and Lisa Omorodion
2020	Fate of Alakada	As Jane	also starring Toyin Abraham, Mercy Eke and Broda Shaggi
