= MC Lively =

Nigerian comedian, lawyer and actor

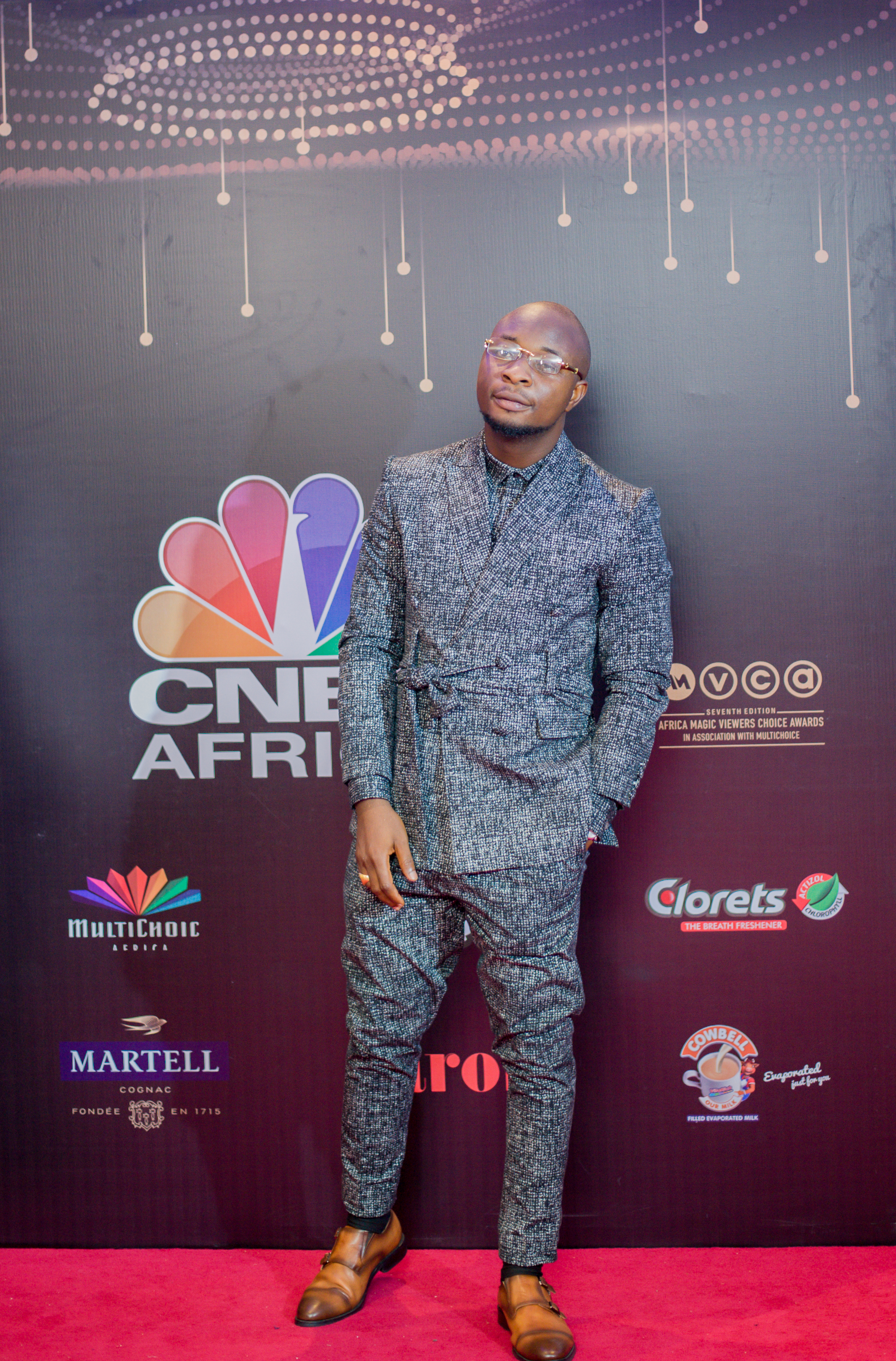
- Mc Lively at the AMVCAs 2020
- Born: Michael Sani Amanesi; August 14, 1992 (age 34); Edo State, Nigeria
- Other name: MC Lively
- Education: Ideal Nursery and Primary School; Moremi High School; Obafemi Awolowo University

Comedy career
- Years active: 2015–present
- Genres: Comedy, Acting

Michael Sani Amanesi (born August 14, 1992), known by his stage name MC Lively, is a Nigerian comedian and actor from Agenebode, Edo State, south-south Nigeria.

== Early life and education ==
MC Lively was born in Osun State, southwest Nigeria. He attended Ideal Nursery and Primary School and Moremi High School. After secondary school, he attended Obafemi Awolowo University, where he studied law and was called to the Nigerian Bar in 2016, which he had turned down to pursue comedy.

== Comedy career and film ==
He began his comedy career in 2015 and came into the limelight through his funny skits "Agidi" where he talked about events and real life issues happening in Nigeria.

MC Lively has performed alongside other comedians, such as Akpororo, Igosave, among others. He featured in the movie Seven and a Half Dates (2018). In the movie he played the role of James, Bisola's second date. He also starred as Dele in the 2020 comedy Fate of Alakada and featured in the 2022 film Survivors.

== Filmography ==
Year	Title	Role
2018	Seven and a Half Dates	James
2020	Fate of Alakada	Dele
2022	Survivors.	

== Awards ==
- Royal African Youth Leadership award given by the Ooni of Ife
- City People Music Award for Comedy Act of the Year

== See also ==
- List of Nigerian comedians
