= Big Brother Naija season 3 =

Season of television series

Big Brother Naija
- Season 3
- Presented by: Ebuka Obi-Uchendu
- No. of days: 84
- No. of housemates: 20
- Winner: Miracle Igbokwe
- Runner-up: Cynthia "Cee-C" Nwadiora

Release
- Original network: Africa Magic
- Original release: 28 January – 22 April 2018

Season chronology
- ← Previous; Season 2 Next → Season 4

Big Brother Naija Season 3, also known as Big Brother Naija: Double Wahala, is the third season of the Nigerian version of the reality show Big Brother. Produced by South Africa's Red Pepper Pictures and it was launched on 28 January 2018 on DStv channel 198 which also served as a live feed from the house. Ex-housemate Ebuka Obi-Uchendu from season one returned as the host. The season ended on 22 April 2018, after running for 12 weeks (85 days).

Miracle Ikechukwu Igbokwe was the winner of the season.

== Housemates ==
During the launch night, twenty housemates entered the house.

Housemates	Age On entry	Occupation	Residence/Birthplace	Day Entered	Day Exited	Status
Miracle Ikechukwu Igbokwe	23	Pilot, model	Lagos/Owerri	0	84	Winner
Cynthia "Cee-C" Nwadiora	25	Lawyer	Enugu	0	84	Runner Up
Oluwatobi "Tobi" Bakre	23	Actor, photographer, investment banker	Ogun State/South Africa	0	84	3rd Place
Asogwa Alexandra "Alex" Amuche Sandra	23	Advertiser, model	Lagos/Nsukka	0	84	4th Place
"Nina"	21	Student, model	Owerri	0	84	5th Place
Omololu "Lolu" Adetokunbo	29	Investment manager	-	0	77	Evicted
Munirat Antoinette "Anto" Lecky	28	Sports manager	United States	0	77	Evicted
Abiri "Khloe" Oluwabusayo	23	Fashion designer	Lagos	0	77	Ejected
Patrick "Rico Swavey" Fakoya	25	Singer	New York City	0	70	Evicted
Temidayo "Teddy A" Adenibuyan	29	Singer, songwriter	Lagos/United States	0	63	Evicted
Oluwabamike "Bambam" Olawunmi	28	Freelancer	Lagos	0	62	Evicted
Iheme "Ifu Ennada" Faith Uloma	26	Actress, business broker	Lagos	0	42	Evicted
Babarinde 'Leo" Akinola Dasilva	25	Managing director	Lagos/London	0	42	Evicted
Angel Awotarigha	31	Filmmaker	Bayelsa	0	35	Evicted
Iwuchukwu "Ahneeka" Marianne OnyiiOnyii	25	TV presenter	-	0	35	Evicted
Adedayo "Dee-One" Adewunmi		Comedian	Minna	0	21	Evicted
Vanessa "Vandora" Williams		Make-up artist, vlogger	Lagos	0	21	Evicted
Bryan "Bitto" Arumun	26	TV host, entrepreneur	Calabar	0	21	Evicted
Linda "Princess" Onyejekwe	25	Business woman	New York City	0	21	Evicted
Kelvin "K.Brule" Brouillette	23	Rapper, producer, songwriter	Lagos	0	21	Ejected

== Pairs ==
Week 1 - Week 3			Week 4 - Week 6		
#	Pairs	Housemates	#	Pairs	Housemates
1	Prito	Princess & Bitto	A	Ceelo	Cee-C & Lolu
2	Bamteddy	Bambam & Teddy A	B	Mito	Miracle & Anto
3	K_Square	K.Brule & Khloe	C	Bamco	Bambam & Rico
4	Ceebi	Cee-C & Tobi	D	Gelah	Angel & Ahneeka
5	Mina	Miracle & Nina	E	Tolex	Tobi & Alex
6	Rineeka	Rico & Ahneeka	F	Lifu	Leo & Ifu
7	Leolex	Leo & Alex	G	Tena	Teddy A & Nina
8	Angelifu	Angel & Ifu			
9	Loto	Anto & Lolu			
10	Vandee	Vandora & Dee-one			

== Nominations table ==
Housemates nominate in pairs for the first six weeks. From Week 7 onwards, housemates played and nominated individually.

			First pairs				Second pairs				Individuals							Nominations Received
			Week 1		Week 2	Week 3	Week 4		Week 5	Week 6	Week 7	Week 8	Week 9	Week 10	Week 11	Week 12 Final		Nominations Received
			Day 0	Day 1	Week 2	Week 3	Day 21	Day 26	Week 5	Week 6	Week 7	Week 8	Week 9	Week 10	Week 11	Week 12 Final		Nominations Received
5	B	Miracle	Main; House	No; Nominations	K.Brule & Khloe; Angel & Ifu	~~Bambam & Teddy A~~; ~~Anto & Lolu~~	Head of House	Bambam & Rico; Angel & Ahneeka	Leo & Ifu; Bambam & Rico	Tobi & Alex; Leo & Ifu	Cee-C; Lolu	Cee-C; Lolu	Cee-C; Lolu	Cee-C; Lolu	No; Nominations	Winner (Day 84)		43
4	A	Cee-C	Main; House	No; Nominations	Princess & Bitto; Anto & Lolu	~~Vandora & Dee-One~~; ~~Anto & Lolu~~	No; Nominations	Miracle & Anto; Bambam & Rico	Angel & Ahneeka; Leo & Ifu	Miracle & Anto; Tobi & Alex	Alex; Anto	Alex; Bambam	Bambam; Teddy A	Alex; Anto	No; Nominations	Runner-up (Day 84)		31
4	E	Tobi	Arena Games; Room	Head of House	Princess & Bitto; Anto & Lolu	~~Vandora & Dee-One~~; ~~Anto & Lolu~~	No; Nominations	Miracle & Anto; Teddy A & Nina	Bambam & Rico; Angel & Ahneeka	Miracle & Anto; Teddy A & Nina	Teddy A Bambam	Teddy A Bambam	Teddy A Bambam	Lolu; Nina	No; Nominations	Third Place (Day 84)		22
7	E	Alex	Arena Games; Room	No; Nominations	Angel & Ifu; Princess & Bitto	~~Angel & Ifu~~; ~~Miracle & Nina~~	No; Nominations	Miracle & Anto; Teddy A & Nina	Bambam & Rico; Angel & Ahneeka	Miracle & Anto; Teddy A & Nina	Bambam; Cee-C	Bambam; Teddy A	Bambam; Teddy A	Rico; Cee-C	Head of House	Fourth Place (Day 84)		17
5	G	Nina	Main; House	No; Nominations	K.Brule & Khloe; Angel & Ifu	~~Bambam & Teddy A~~; ~~Anto & Lolu~~	No; Nominations	Tobi & Alex; Angel & Ahneeka	Leo & Ifu; Angel & Ahneeka	Tobi & Alex; Cee-C & Lolu	Bambam; Lolu	Bambam; Rico	Cee-C; Lolu	Lolu; Cee-C	No; Nominations	Fifth Place (Day 84)		37
9	A	Lolu	Main; House	No; Nominations	Angel & Ifu; K.Brule & Khloe	~~Cee-C & Tobi~~; ~~Miracle & Nina~~	No; Nominations	Miracle & Anto; Bambam & Rico	Angel & Ahneeka; Leo & Ifu	Miracle & Anto; Tobi & Alex	Rico; Bambam	Cee-C; Rico	MIracle; Nina	Cee-C; Miracle	No; Nominations	Evicted (Day 77)		26
9	B	Anto	Main; House	No; Nominations	Angel & Ifu; K.Brule & Khloe	~~Cee-C & Tobi~~; ~~Miracle & Nina~~	No; Nominations	Bambam & Rico; Angel & Ahneeka	Leo & Ifu; Bambam & Rico	Tobi & Alex; Leo & Ifu	Teddy A Alex	Evicted (Day 50)	Cee-C; Bambam	Cee-C; Rico	No; Nominations	Re-evicted (Day 77)		33
3	Khloe		Main; House	No; Nominations	Miracle & Nina; Princess & Bitto	~~Vandora & Dee-One~~; ~~Cee-C & Tobi~~	Ejected (Day 22)						Cee-C; Alex	Nina; Alex	No; Nominations	Evicted (Day 77)		10
6	C	Rico Swavey	Main; House	No; Nominations	Princess & Bitto; Miracle & Nina	~~Miracle & Nina~~; ~~Anto & Lolu~~	No; Nominations	Angel & Ahneeka; Teddy A & Nina	Cee-C & Lolu; Leo & Ifu	Miracle & Anto; Leo & Ifu	Cee-C; Miracle	Lolu; Bambam	Cee-C; Teddy A	Cee-C; Lolu	Evicted (Day 70)			18
2	G	Teddy A	Main; House	No; Nominations	K.Brule & Khloe; Miracle & Nina	~~Miracle & Nina~~; ~~Anto & Lolu~~	No; Nominations	Tobi & Alex; Angel & Ahneeka	Leo & Ifu; Angel & Ahneeka	Tobi & Alex; Cee-C & Lolu	Tobi; Miracle	Tobi; Rico Swavey	Miracle; Nina	Evicted (Day 63)				24
2	C	Bambam	Main; House	No; Nominations	K.Brule & Khloe; Miracle & Nina	~~Miracle & Nina~~; ~~Anto & Lolu~~	No; Nominations	Angel & Ahneeka; Teddy A & Nina	Cee-C & Lolu; Leo & Ifu	Miracle & Anto; Leo & Ifu	Tobi; Anto	Tobi; Alex	Cee-C; Nina	Evicted (Day 62)				29
8	F	Ifu	Main; House	No; Nominations	K.Brule & Khloe; Leo & Alex	~~Cee-C & Tobi~~; ~~Miracle & Nina~~	No; Nominations	Bambam & Rico; Teddy A & Nina	Miracle & Anto; Bambam & Rico	Miracle & Anto; Teddy A & Nina	Evicted (Day 42)							24
7	F	Leo	Arena Games; Room	No; Nominations	Angel & Ifu; Princess & Bitto	~~Angel & Ifu~~; ~~Miracle & Nina~~	No; Nominations	Bambam & Rico; Teddy A & Nina	Miracle & Anto; Bambam & Rico	Miracle & Anto; Teddy A & Nina	Evicted (Day 42)							16
8	D	Angel	Main; House	No; Nominations	K.Brule & Khloe; Leo & Alex	~~Cee-C & Tobi~~; ~~Miracle & Nina~~	No; Nominations	Teddy A & Nina; Miracle & Anto	Miracle & Anto; Leo & Ifu	Evicted (Day 35)								22
6	D	Ahneeka	Arena Games; Room	No; Nominations	Princess & Bitto; Miracle & Nina	~~Miracle & Nina~~; ~~Anto & Lolu~~	No; Nominations	Teddy A & Nina; Miracle & Anto	Miracle & Anto; Leo & Ifu	Evicted (Day 35)								12
10	Dee-One		Arena Games; Room	No; Nominations	Angel & Ifu; Anto & Lolu	~~Miracle & Nina~~; ~~Cee-C & Tobi~~	Evicted (Day 21)											4
10	Vandora		Arena Games; Room	No; Nominations	Angel & Ifu; Anto & Lolu	~~Miracle & Nina~~; ~~Cee-C & Tobi~~	Evicted (Day 21)											4
1	Bitto		Main; House	No; Nominations	Bambam & Teddy A K.Brule & Khloe	~~Cee-C & Tobi~~; ~~Miracle & Nina~~	Evicted (Day 21)											8
1	Princess		Main; House	No; Nominations	Bambam & Teddy A K.Brule & Khloe	~~Cee-C & Tobi~~; ~~Miracle & Nina~~	Evicted (Day 21)											8
3	K.Brule		Main; House	No; Nominations	Miracle & Nina; Princess & Bitto	~~Vandora & Dee-One~~; ~~Cee-C & Tobi~~	Ejected (Day 21)											10
Notes			1	2	3	4,	5, 6		6		7	8, 9		10	11	12		
Head of House			none	Tobi	Tobi	Khloe	Miracle		Tobi	Bambam	Nina	Miracle	Tobi	Khloe	Alex	Nina, Cee-C, Alex		
Nominated (pre-save and replace)			none	none	Angel & Ifu; K.Brule & Khloe; Anto & Lolu; Miracle & Nina; Princess & Bitto	Nominations; Void	none		Leo & Ifu; Angel & Ahneeka; Bambam & Rico	Tobi & Alex; Leo & Ifu; Miracle & Anto; Teddy A & Nina	none	Alex; Bambam; Cee-C; Lolu; Rico; Teddy A Tobi	none	Alex; Cee-C; Lolu; Nina; Rico	Anto; Cee-C; Khloe; Lolu; Miracle; Tobi	none		
Saved			none	none	Miracle & Nina	Leo & Alex	none		Bambam & Rico	Teddy A & Nina	none	Tobi	none	none	Tobi	none		
Against public vote			none	none	~~Angel & Ifu~~; ~~K.Brule & Khloe~~; ~~Anto & Lolu~~; ~~Bambam & Teddy A~~; ~~Princess & Bitto~~	Princess & Bitto; Bambam & Teddy A Cee-C & Tobi; Miracle & Nina; Rico & Ahneeka; Angel & Ifu; Anto & Lolu; Vandora & Dee-One	none		Leo & Ifu; Angel & Ahneeka; Cee-C & Lolu	Tobi & Alex; Cee-C & Lolu; Leo & Ifu; Miracle & Anto	Anto; Cee-C; Lolu; Bambam; Tobi; Alex; Teddy A Miracle	~~Alex~~; ~~Bambam~~; ~~Cee-C~~; ~~Lolu~~; ~~Rico~~; ~~Teddy A~~	Bambam; Cee-C; Nina; Teddy A	Alex; Cee-C; Lolu; Nina; Rico; Miracle	Anto; Cee-C; Khloe; Lolu; Miracle	Alex; Cee-C; Miracle; Nina; Tobi		
Ejected			none			K.Brule & Khloe	none											
Evicted			Ahneeka, Alex, Dee-One, Leo, Tobi; Vandora; Fake evicted by twist	none	No; Eviction	Princess & Bitto; 3.05% to save	none		Angel & Ahneeka; 26.97% to save	Leo & Ifu; 10.90% to save	Anto; 5.28% to save	Anto; Khloe; Won re-entry into game	Bambam; 13.37% to save	Rico; 7.71% to save	Lolu; 22.23% to save	Nina; 4.18% to win	Alex; 7.07% to win	
Evicted			Ahneeka, Alex, Dee-One, Leo, Tobi; Vandora; Fake evicted by twist	none	No; Eviction	Princess & Bitto; 3.05% to save	none		Angel & Ahneeka; 26.97% to save	Leo & Ifu; 10.90% to save	Anto; 5.28% to save	Anto; Khloe; Won re-entry into game	Bambam; 13.37% to save	Rico; 7.71% to save	Anto; 3.67% to save	Nina; 4.18% to win	Alex; 7.07% to win	
Evicted			Ahneeka, Alex, Dee-One, Leo, Tobi; Vandora; Fake evicted by twist	none	No; Eviction	Vandora & Dee-One; 2.98% to save	none		Angel & Ahneeka; 26.97% to save	Leo & Ifu; 10.90% to save	Anto; 5.28% to save	Anto; Khloe; Won re-entry into game	Teddy A 16.81% to save	Rico; 7.71% to save	Anto; 3.67% to save	Tobi; 22.53% to win	Cee-C; 28.04% to win	
Evicted			Ahneeka, Alex, Dee-One, Leo, Tobi; Vandora; Fake evicted by twist	none	No; Eviction	Vandora & Dee-One; 2.98% to save	none		Angel & Ahneeka; 26.97% to save	Leo & Ifu; 10.90% to save	Anto; 5.28% to save	Anto; Khloe; Won re-entry into game	Teddy A 16.81% to save	Rico; 7.71% to save	Khloe; 1.89% to save	Tobi; 22.53% to win	Cee-C; 28.04% to win	
Saved			none	none	No; Eviction	Miracle & Nina; 28.05% Bambam & Teddy A 21.60% Anto & Lolu; 15.18% Cee-C & Tobi; 13.49% Rico & Ahneeka; 11.65% Angel & Ifu; 3.99%	none		Cee-C & Lolu; 44.67% Leo & Ifu; 28.37%	Miracle & Anto; 34.16% Cee-C & Lolu; 30.38% Tobi & Alex; 24.56%	Miracle; 27.98% Tobi; 16.69% Cee-C; 14.19% Lolu; 12.85% Teddy A 8.41% Alex; 8.19% Bambam; 6.40%	Anto; Khloe; Won re-entry into game	Nina; 45.44% Cee-C; 24.38%	Miracle; 25.76% Cee-C; 19.80% Lolu; 16.29% Nina; 15.81% Alex; 14.63%	Miracle; 44.33% Cee-C; 27.88%	Miracle; 38.18 to win		

=== Notes ===
- ^Note 1: On Launch night, Biggie set a fake eviction after all housemates entered the house. The housemates who couldn't find beds that corresponded with the numbers they received on stage must leave the house immediately. Ahneeka, Alex, Dee-One, Leo, Tobi and Vandora were fake evicted to the Arena Games Room.
- ^Note 2: There were no nominations in the first week.
- ^Note 3: Housemates' nominations were fake, and no eviction this week.
- ^Note 4: K.Brule & Khloe were ejected from the house for receiving three strikes.
- ^Note 5: There were no nominations and eviction this week.
- ^Note 6: On Day 26, housemates nominated pairs of their choice. Teddy A and Nina received the most votes therefore immune from the next round of nominations.
- ^Note 7: On Day 43, housemates nominated individually. The Head of House was not allowed to save and replace nominated housemates.
- ^Note 8: On Day 49, the host, Ebuka Obi-Uchendu, announced that two of the eleven evicted housemates will have the opportunity to return to the house (the following week) by having the majority of public votes.
- ^Note 9: On Day 50, the host, Ebuka Obi-Uchendu, announced that no housemate will be put up for the public vote.
- ^Note 10: On Day 64, the Head of House was made to add another housemate for possible eviction. The Head of House added Miracle.
- ^Note 11: On Day 71, housemates were subjected to a challenge and then ranked according to their performance. Alex ranked 1st place, making her the Head of House and putting other housemates up for possible eviction. Thereafter, Alex randomly picked a chance card empowering her to save one housemate of her choice, as well as the housemate that ranked 4th place in the day's challenge. Nina was automatically saved because she ranked 4th in the challenge, and Alex chose to save Tobi
- ^Note 12: On Day 78, housemates voted Nina as Head of House - flouting Big Brother's directive to choose a housemate with the least experience as Head of House. On Day 79, Big Brother appointed Cee-C who then had the least Head of House experience, as Head of House. On Day 80, Big Brother made housemate select the Head of House of their choice, then Alex emerged the new Head of House

== Repechage ==
On Day 49, the host, Ebuka Obi-Uchendu, announced that two of the eleven evicted housemates will have the opportunity to return to the house (on Week 9) by having the majority of public votes.

Evicted housemate	Percentage	Result
Anto	20.67%	Re-entered
Khloe	18.46%	Re-entered
Ifu	16.19%	
Ahneeka	13.94%	
Dee-One	7.13%	
Leo	6.85%	
Vandora	5.44%	
Princess	3.95%	
K.Brule	3.80%	
Bitto	2.26%	
Angel	1.31%	
