= Bamike Olawunmi =

Nigerian actress and reality TV star

Bamike Olawunmi-Adenibuyan
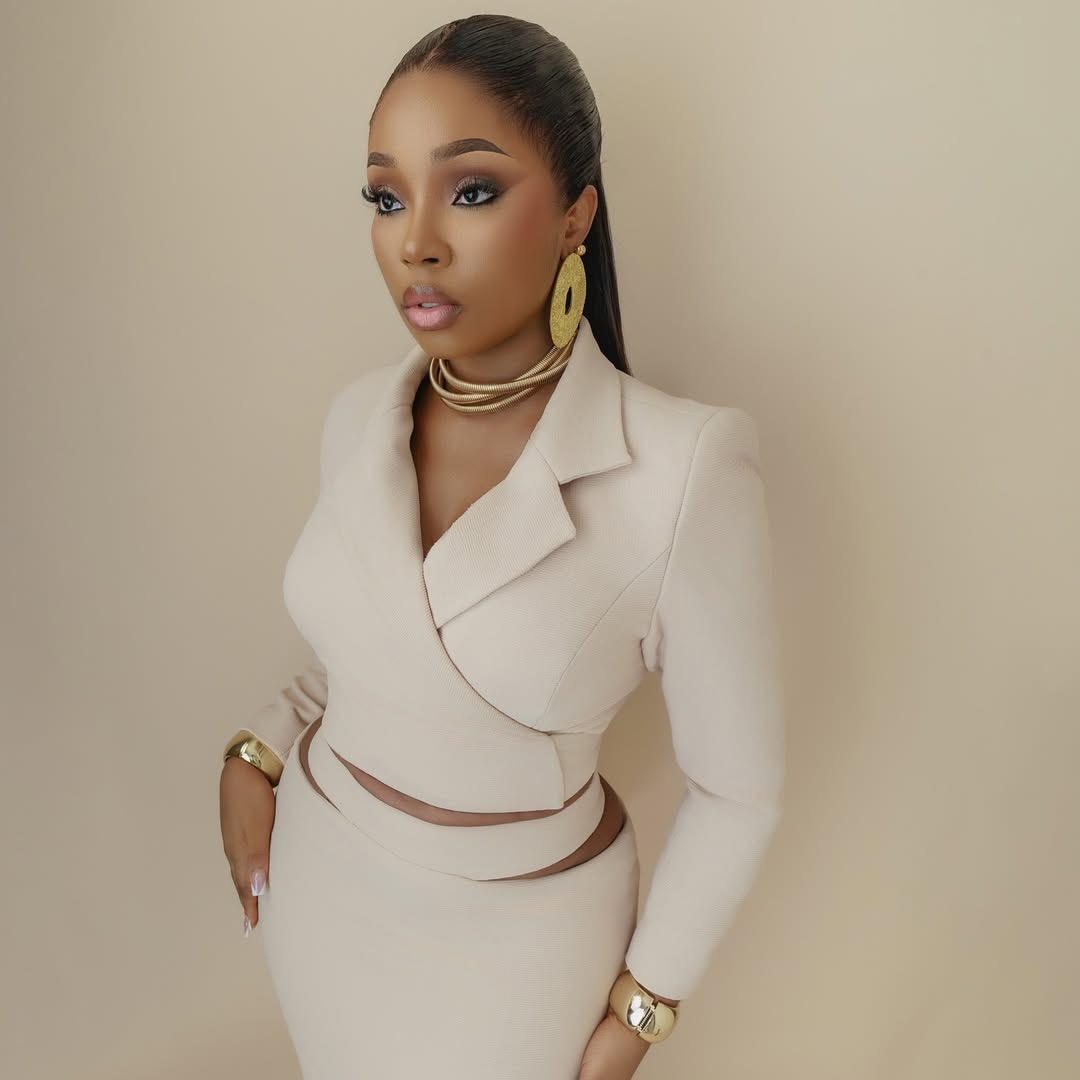
- BamBam in 2024
- Born: 24 April 1989 (age 37); Lagos, Nigeria
- Other name: BamBam
- Education: Bells University of Technology; Royal Arts Academy
- Occupations: Actress, singer, reality-TV personality
- Years active: 2017–present
- Known for: Foreigner’s God (2019), Love in Every Word (2025)
- Spouse: Tope "Teddy A" Adenibuyan (m. 2019)
- Children: 2

Bamike Olawunmi-Adenibuyan (born 24 April 1989), known professionally as Bam Bam, is a Nigerian film and stage actress. She is known for her roles in the supernatural drama Foreigner's God (2019) and the romantic film Love in Every Word (2025). She has also appeared in stage productions such as Fela's Republic & the Kalakuta Queens and Moremi: The Musical.

== Early life and education ==
Olawunmi was born in Lagos, Nigeria, the eldest child of a retired nurse and a career diplomat. Due to her father's postings, she spent parts of her childhood in the United States, France and the United Kingdom. She attended Nigerian Navy Primary School, Apapa, for her primary education, and La Folie St James, Paris, for her secondary education. After returning to Nigeria, she obtained a bachelor's degree in microbiology from Bells University of Technology, Ota, and later trained in acting at the Royal Arts Academy.

== Career ==
=== Beginnings and Big Brother Naija ===
After two audition attempts—Abuja in 2017 and Lagos in early 2018—Olawunmi was selected for Big Brother Naija "Double Wahala" season 3. Although evicted before the finale, she gained national recognition and adopted the nickname "Bam Bam."

=== Acting ===
Olawunmi-Adenibuyan started her acting career in 2017 when she was still a student of the Royal Arts Academy. She made her screen debut in 2018 in the web series Inspector K and later appeared in supporting roles in Nollywood films such as Backup Wife (2018) and Ifan Michael's period fantasy Foreigner's God (2019). In 2025, Olawunmi-Adenibuyan played Chioma in Omoni Oboli's film Love in Every Word.

== Other ventures ==
In 2021, Olawunmi-Adenibuyan launched Bam Beauty Oil, a skincare line that reportedly grossed ₦25 million in initial sales.

== Philanthropy and advocacy ==
She founded the Bammy Bestowed Foundation, which funds maternal-health outreaches and scholarships for girls. In 2023, she joined MTV Base Africa's voter-registration campaign alongside 2Baba and Tiwa Savage.

== Personal life ==
She married fellow Big Brother Naija alumnus Tope "Teddy A" Adenibuyan on 7 September 2019 in Ogun State, followed by a white ceremony on 16 November 2019 in Dubai. The couple have two children. In a 2020 interview, she disclosed that she had complications during her first childbirth and subsequently battled postpartum depression.

== Selected filmography ==
Film
| Year | Title | Role | Notes |
|---|---|---|---|
| 2017 | Inspector K | Various | Recurring (web series) |
| 2018 | Backup Wife | | Feature film |
| 2019 | Foreigner's God | | Feature film |
| 2021 | Lockdown | | Feature film |
| 2024 | Merry Side of You | Tonia | Feature film |
| 2024 | Twin Deception | | Feature film |
| 2025 | Love in Every Word | Chioma | Lead |
| 2025 | Wrong Door | Vanessa | Lead |
| 2025 | The Gift Within | Ngozi | Lead |
| 2025 | Just Say Yes | Coco | Lead |
| 2026 | Without You | Ifeoma | Lead |

=== Theatre (selected) ===
| Year | Production | Role | Venue |
|---|---|---|---|
| 2019 | Fela's Republic & the Kalakuta Queens | Ensemble lead | Nelson Mandela Theatre, Johannesburg |
| 2019 | Moremi: The Musical | Moremi Ajasoro | Terra Kulture, Lagos |
| 2021 | Ada the Country | Ada | Freedom Park, Lagos–Abuja tour |
| 2022 | Love Is… The Musical | Amaka | Lagos |
