= Survivors (2022 film) =

2022 Nigeria comedy movie

- Directed by: Kayode Peters
- Produced by: John Esedafe
- Starring: Mr Macaroni; Broda Shaggi; MC Lively; I Go Save; Chinonso Arubayi; Chris Iheuwa; Tony Akosheri
- Production company: Tunice Entertainment World
- Release date: 1 July 2022 (Lagos)
- Country: Nigeria
- Language: Yoruba

Survivors is a 2022 Nigerian comedy movie that was produced by John Esedafe and directed by Kayode Peters and produced by Tunice Entertainment World.

The movie was released on 1 July 2022 and it stars Mr Macaroni, Broda Shaggi, MC Lively, I Go Save, Chinonso Arubayi, Chris Iheuwa and Tony Akosheri.

== Synopsis ==
The movie revolves around Gideon and Zacchaeus, two roadside mechanics in their struggle to become wealthy. They eventually met David, a criminal, who introduced them to the act of kidnapping.

== Cast ==
- Mr Macaroni
- Broda Shaggi
- MC Lively
- I Go Save
- Chinonso Arubayi
- Chris Iheuwa
- Tony Akosheri
