= 13 Letters =

13 Letters may refer to:

- 13 Letters (album), a 2007 compilation album by 116 Clique
- 13 Letters (film), a 2021 Nigerian romantic film
