= Foreigner's God =

2019 Nigerian film

- Directed by: Ifan Ifeanyi Michael
- Produced by: Kelechi Freeman Ukadike
- Starring: Stanley Evans MBE, Henry Coxe, Ini Dima-Okojie, Toni Tones, Pete Edochie, Bambam (Oluwabamike Olawumi), Teddy A (Tope Teddy Adenibuyan), Eucharia Anunobi, Sam Dede, Toyin Abraham.
- Production company: Ifan Micheal Productions
- Release date: 2019
- Country: Nigeria
- Language: English

Foreigner's God is a 2019 Nigerian drama film produced by Kelechi Freeman Ukadike and directed by Ifan Ifeanyi Michael under Ifan Micheal Productions. The film stars Henry Coxe, Ini Dima-Okojie, Toni Tones, Pete Edochie, Nkem Owoh, Bamike Olawunmi, Tope Adenibuyan (Teddy A), Eucharia Anunobi, Sam Dede, Toyin Abraham, Salma Mumin, among others.

== Synopsis ==
An English documentary photographer came to Igboland during the colonial era in search of a story. His bodyguard mysteriously disappeared and later fell in love with a woman accused of witchcraft, who lives in an isolated witch camp in the jungle under harsh conditions, resulting in significant consequences.

== Cast ==
- Stanley Evans MBE
- Henry Coxe
- Ini Dima-Okojie
- Toni Tones
- Bamike Olawunmi (Bambam)
- Tope Teddy Adenibuyan (Teddy A)
- Pete Edochie
- Nkem Owoh
- Sam Dede
- Eucharia Anunobi
- Toyin Abraham
- Lala Akindoju
- Kunle Idowu
- Sharon Ooja
- Linda Osifo
- Yinka Pierce-Tijani
- Annie Idibia

== Production and release ==
The film was produced in 2019 and acquired by Amazon Prime Video in 2022.
