= Unmarried (TV series) =

- Country of origin: Nigeria
- Original language: English

Original release
- Release: 2020

Unmarried is a 2020 Nigerian romantic TV series about three single ladies who despite their differences are friends. The series is aired on Africa Magic.

== Premier ==
The TV series was premiered on 12 January on Africa Magic shows by 9pm.

== Cast ==
- Venita Akpofure as Nengi
- Helen Enado Odigie as Funbi
- Ada Afoluwake Ogunkeye as Kamsi
- Mapula Mafole as Rea

== Synopsis ==
Three single ladies who grew up on the same street had to go through life such as romance, relationships and childbirth.

== Awards and nominations ==
Year	Award	Category	Recipient	Result	Ref
2023	Africa Magic Viewers' Choice Awards	Best Original Drama Series	Unmarried	Nominated	
