= Mamba's Diamond =

2021 Nigerian action comedy heist film by Seyi Babatope

- Directed by: Seyi Babatope
- Written by: Darlington Abuda
- Produced by: Uchemba Williams
- Starring: Osas Ighodaro; Gabriel Afolayan; Uchemba Williams; Nse Ikpe-Etim; Venita Akpofure; Jimmy Odukoya; Ayo Makun; Dibor Adaobi Lilian
- Production company: Williams Uchemba Productions
- Release date: 19 March 2021
- Country: Nigeria
- Language: English

Mamba's Diamond is a 2021 Nigerian action comedy heist film written by Darlington Abuda and directed by Seyi Babatope. The film stars Osas Ighodaro, Gabriel Afolayan, and Uchemba Williams in the lead roles. The film is based on a story of a couple of amateur thieves who accidentally steal a piece of diamond, which is one of the most valuable precious jewels in the world. The film had its theatrical release on 19 March 2021.

== Cast ==
- Osas Ighodaro as Eloho
- Gabriel Afolayan as Elenu
- Uchemba Williams as Obi
- Nse Ikpe-Etim as Mamba
- Venita Akpofure as Rose
- Jimmy Odukoya as Jay
- Ayo Makun
- Dibor Adaobi Lilian

== Production ==
The film project marked Uchemba Williams's debut film as producer and bankrolled the film under his production banner Williams Uchemba Productions. The principal photography of the film began in February 2021 and portions of the film were predominantly shot at a real diamond mine in Johannesburg, South Africa. It was revealed that the stunt sequences for the film were choreographed by Olukiran Babatunde Olawale in October 2020.
