= Losing Control (TV series) =

2015 Nigerian television series

- Directed by: Ikechukwu Onyeka
- Country of origin: Nigeria
- No. of seasons: 3
- No. of episodes: 39

Production
- Producer: Emem Isong
- Production companies: Royal Arts Academy, ROK Studios

Original release
- Release: 21 February 2015

Losing Control is a 2015 Nigerian television series produced by Rok Studios and Royal Arts Academy, written by Vivian Chiji and directed by Ikechukwu Onyeka. The series debuted on 21 February 2015 on iROKOtv. The first two seasons of the series are broadcast on the ROK channels on Sky UK and DStv

== Synopsis ==
An out of work squatter disguises herself as a man in order to deceitfully gain employment, only to find herself entangled in a web of unrequited love and murder.

== Cast and characters ==
- Mary Remmy Njoku as Vanilla, a cynical young woman who claims she doesn't "do love," but has somehow managed to fall in love with Kunle, the man she is dating.
- Joseph Benjamin as Kunle Adetokunbo, a married man and father-to-be who is having an affair with Vanilla. Kunle is the MD of an oil company and often uses work as an excuse to step out on his wife.
- Mary Lazarus as Uche Okafor, an unemployed young woman who is desperately seeking work after dozens of unsuccessful job interviews. She rejects her friend Vanilla's suggestion of becoming a runs girl and instead opts to disguise herself as a man in order to land a job.
- Venita Akpofure (season 1) as Coco, a temperamental young woman and survivor of childhood trauma. She and Vanilla share a one-bedroom apartment. Sylvia Oluchy plays the role of Coco in season 2.
- Michael Godson as Allen, Coco and Vanilla's next-door neighbor. A kind and thoughtful young man, Allen has a persistent crush on Coco, despite her rejection of his advances.
- Susan Peters as Mrs. Ade, the head of HR at Kunle's company.
- Udeze Onyinye as Lily, Kunle's wife.
- Mena Sodje in season 2 & 3 as Nurse Ada, Kunle's favorite nurse.
- Kachi Nnochiri as Eric
- Eddie Watson as Bayo
- Etinosa Idemudia as Marita
