= Crazy Grannies =

2021 Nigeria comedy film

- Directed by: Kayode Peters, Tope Alake
- Written by: Joy Elumelu
- Produced by: Rosemary Idomijie
- Starring: Shaffy Bello, Ngozi Nwosu, comedian Damilola Adekoya, Bolanle Ninalowo and Jimmy Odukoya.
- Production company: Elrab Entertainment
- Distributed by: Blue Pictures Entertainment
- Release date: 30 July 2021 (Victoria Island, Lagos)
- Language: English

Crazy Grannies is a 2021 comedic movie written by Joy Elumelu, co-directed by Tope Alake and Kayode Peters under the production company of Elrab Entertainment.

It stars Shaffy Bello, Ngozi Nwosu, comedian Damilola Adekoya, Bolanle Ninalowo and Jimmy Odukoya.

== Premiere ==
The movie was premiered on Saturday, July 30, 2021, at the Victoria Island, Lagos and it was made available in Cinemas starting from August 6, 2021.

== Synopsis ==
The movie revolves around three funny grandmas who decided to relieve themselves of youthful stress and take a needed trip to a resort where they have the hilarious adventures of their lives.

== Cast ==
- Bolanle Ninalowo as Kayode
- Jimmy Odukoya as Adam
- Buchi as Austel
- Bayray Mcnwizu as Munachi
- Kayode Peters as Femi
- Chinonso Arubayi as Chidinma
- Mercy Aigbe as Ewa
- Mr Macaroni as Pastor Igbalode
- Abazie Rosemary as Doctor
- Jay Rammal as Chaperon
- Marvelous Dominion as Extra
- Ngozi Nwosu as Cheta
- Pearl Agwu as Extra
- Kolawole Iremide as Baby
- Patience Emmanuel as Extra
- Princess Damilola Adekoya as Ere
- Yemi Sikola
- Modella Gabriella
