= Teniola Aladese =

Nigerian actress

- Born: Lagos State
- Education: Covenant University
- Occupations: Actress; producer; casting director

Teniola Aladese is a Nigerian actress, producer and casting director.

== Early life ==
Aladese was born on 18 September 1993 in Agege, Lagos State, and studied mass communication at Covenant University.

== Career ==
Aladese worked as a production coordinator on more than 30 Africa Magic Original Films from 2013 to 2015. She came into the limelight after starring as Akweyon in Jemeji, where she was also the production manager.

In 2015, she appeared in Perfectly Flawed. In 2018, she was the line producer for Forbidden.

== Filmography ==
Year	Title	Role	Ref
2025	To Kill a Monkey	Ivie	
2024	Christmas in Lagos	Fiyin	
2024	The Legend of the Vagabond Queen of Lagos	Happiness	
2023	Something Like Gold	Yemisi	
2022	Loving Amanda	Amanda	
2021	Soólè	Clara	
2021	Superstar	Cynthia	
2021	Little Black Book	Tade	
2021	Ricordi	Adesoye	
2020	Unbroken	Folasade 'FK' Kuku	
2020	Finding Hubby	Tosan	
2020	Lara of Lagos	Lara	
2018	Jemeji	Akweyon	
2015	Perfectly Flawed		

== Awards and nominations ==
Year	Award	Category	Work	Result	Ref
2022	The Future Awards Africa	Prize for Acting		Nominated	
2022	2022 Africa Magic Viewers' Choice Awards	Trailblazer award		Won	
2023	Africa Magic Viewers' Choice Awards	Best Supporting Actress	Love In A Pandemic	Nominated	
