= I Am Nazzy =

2022 Nigerian movie

- Directed by: Kayode Peters
- Written by: Pearl Agwu
- Produced by: Chinonso Arubayi
- Starring: Jidekene Achufusi, Jimmy Odukoya, Denrele Edun, IK Ogbonna, and Ada Jesus
- Production companies: Arubayi’s Film City Studios and Blue Pictures Entertainment.
- Release date: 2022
- Country: Nigeria
- Language: English

I Am Nazzy is a 2022 Nollywood debutant movie of Chinonso Arubayi and directed by Kayode Peters under the production company of Arubayi’s Film City Studios and Blue Pictures Entertainment.

The swap identity movie stars Jidekene Achufusi, Jimmy Odukoya, Denrele Edun, IK Ogbonna, and Ada Jesus and others.

== Plot ==
I am Nazzy is a movie that emphasizes contentment. It shows that not all smiles mean happiness. In the film, superstar Nazzy wanted to move away from her celebrity life. A life full of pretence and scandal. Her boyfriend, who was supposed to make her happy, preferred social media likes than her attention. She met a therapist who advised her to move away from the life full of glitz and glamour. Fortunately, she met her look alike and decide to exchange lifestyles with her. The movie left the viewers in suspense on how the duo would deal with their relationship and career

== Premiere ==
The movie was released on the 1 April 2022 and it was premiered at EbonyLife Cinemas on Sunday 27 March 2022 with eminent personalities gracing the event. Among them are; Bolanle Ninalowo, Stan Eze and Blessing Nze, Elozonam, Denrele Edun, Nons Miraj, Tomi Odunsi, Simi Drey and many more

== Cast ==
- Jide Kene Achufusi
- Chinonso Arubayi
- Denrele Edun
- Kaycee George
- Ada Jesus
- Chioma Nwosu
- Jimmy Odukoya
- IK Ogbonna
- Onyebuchi Ojieh
- Blessing Onwukwe
- Jay Rammal
