= Seven and a Half Dates =

Nigerian romantic drama film

- Directed by: Biodun Stephen
- Produced by: Toyin Abraham
- Starring: Mercy Johnson; Jim Iyke; Akin Lewis; Sola Sobowale
- Release date: 2018
- Country: Nigeria
- Language: English

Seven and a Half Dates is a 2018 Nigerian movie directed by Biodun Stephen and produced by Toyin Abraham.

== Plot ==
The film gives as insight in the life of a young lady Bisola, a hard working entrepreneur who is the first born of her parent. Her sister is married and she is not married yet. The Dad wants her to get married as soon as possible so he sets up 10 dates for her from which she found her love.

== Cast ==
- Mercy Johnson as Bisola Gomez
- Jim Iyke as Jason Lawal
- Akin Lewis as Mr. Gomez
- Sola Sobowale as Mrs. Gomez
- Toyin Abraham as Abiodun
- Fathia Williams as Mrs. Cole
- Bayray McNwizu as Mabel
