= Loving Amanda =

2021 Nigerian film

- Directed by: Michael Akinrogunde
- Written by: Laju Iren
- Produced by: Laju Iren
- Starring: Blossom Chukwujekwu, Teniola Aladese, Chinonso Arubayi and Adesunmbo Adeoye.
- Production company: Laju Iren Films
- Release date: 2021
- Country: Nigeria
- Language: English

Loving Amanda is a 2021 Nigerian romance film produced by Laju Iren, based on her novel of the same name, and directed by Michael Akinrogunde under Laju Iren Films. The film stars Blossom Chukwujekwu, Teniola Aladese, Chinonso Arubayi and Adesunmbo Adeoye.

== Synopsis ==
Amanda is an orphan who grew into a young woman taken advantage of and abused. She knows nothing of inner peace until one fateful day when she meets Goch, a man of God who leads her on her journey to redemption.

== Cast ==
- Sunmbo Adeoye
- Murewa Alade
- Teniola Aladese
- Chinonso Arubayi
- Steve Asinobi
- Alex Ayalogu
- Kikelomo Balogun
- Michael Bassey
- Joy Bliss
- Solomon Bryan
- Blossom Chukwujekwu
- Femi Laco Coker
- Pela Snr
- Rita Edward

== Premiere ==
The film premiered virtually, a first of its kind. It was first screened on 15 April 2021 and repeated on Easter Monday, 18 April 2021.
