= Kayode Peters =

Nigerian filmmaker (1975–2025)

- Born: Kayode Peters Adewumi; 25 September 1975; Ibadan, Western State, Nigeria
- Died: 28 June 2025 (aged 49); Toronto, Ontario, Canada
- Occupations: Actor, director, producer
- Years active: 2000–2025

Kayode Peters Adewumi (25 September 1975 – 28 June 2025) was a Nigerian actor and film, television and stage producer and director.

== Life and career ==
Peters was born in Ibadan, Nigeria on 25 September 1975. Peters started his acting career as a stage actor with Theatre 15, University of Lagos. He studied English at the University of Lagos before earning a master’s in film and television production from the University of Greenwich, UK. He also completed a diploma in digital marketing from a Canadian institution. Peters was deeply involved in Nollywood, working on a range of films, web series, and stage productions.

After graduating, Peters produced a television series titled The Twilight Zone in 2000. Peters came to prominence when he created and directed the popular television comedy series Flatmates in the early 2000s. The show was revived in 2017 as My Flatmates. He produced and worked on more than 10 television shows, including Inlaws, Half Sisters, My Mad Husband, Mr. and Mrs. Spencer, Oga Landlord, and Extended Family.

Peters has directed many films, including Doll House, 13 Letters, Crazy Grannies, Survivors, I Am Nazzy, The Perfect Time, Dream Job, and Teardrops. Peters had an interest in the experience of the diaspora community; he made his first international film, Excuse My African in New York City in 2017. His short films on the subject also gained international attention; Bring 'em Back for example received accolades in Toronto and London.

Peters was also involved in theatre work, having written, produced and directed more than 15 stage plays.

Peters died after a long illness in Toronto, on 28 June 2025, at the age of 49.

== Filmography ==
Year	Title	Nominations and Awards
2015	Doll House	Woodpecker film festival, New Dehli, India
2016	Lamine	
2017	The Other Wife	
2017	Dead Rite	
2018	Road to Friendship	
2018	The Hired Gun	
2020	Bring 'em back	Best short film, TIFF Toronto Canada; Best short, NIFF film festival, London; Best short film, Indie film festival, Sheffield
2021	The Real Us	
2021	Crazy Grannies	
2021	Dream Job	
2021	The Perfect Time	
2021	13 Letters	
2021	Alaga	
2021	Trump Card	
2021	Teardrops	
2021	Killing Eva	
2021	Backlash	
2022	Identical Justice	Auber film festival, France
2022	Survivors	
2022	I am Nazzy	
2022	The Wife	
2022	Ebi	
2023	Fatima Aya Mi	
2023	Fadekemi	
2023	The Exchange	
