= Venita Akpofure =

British-Nigerian actress and video vixen

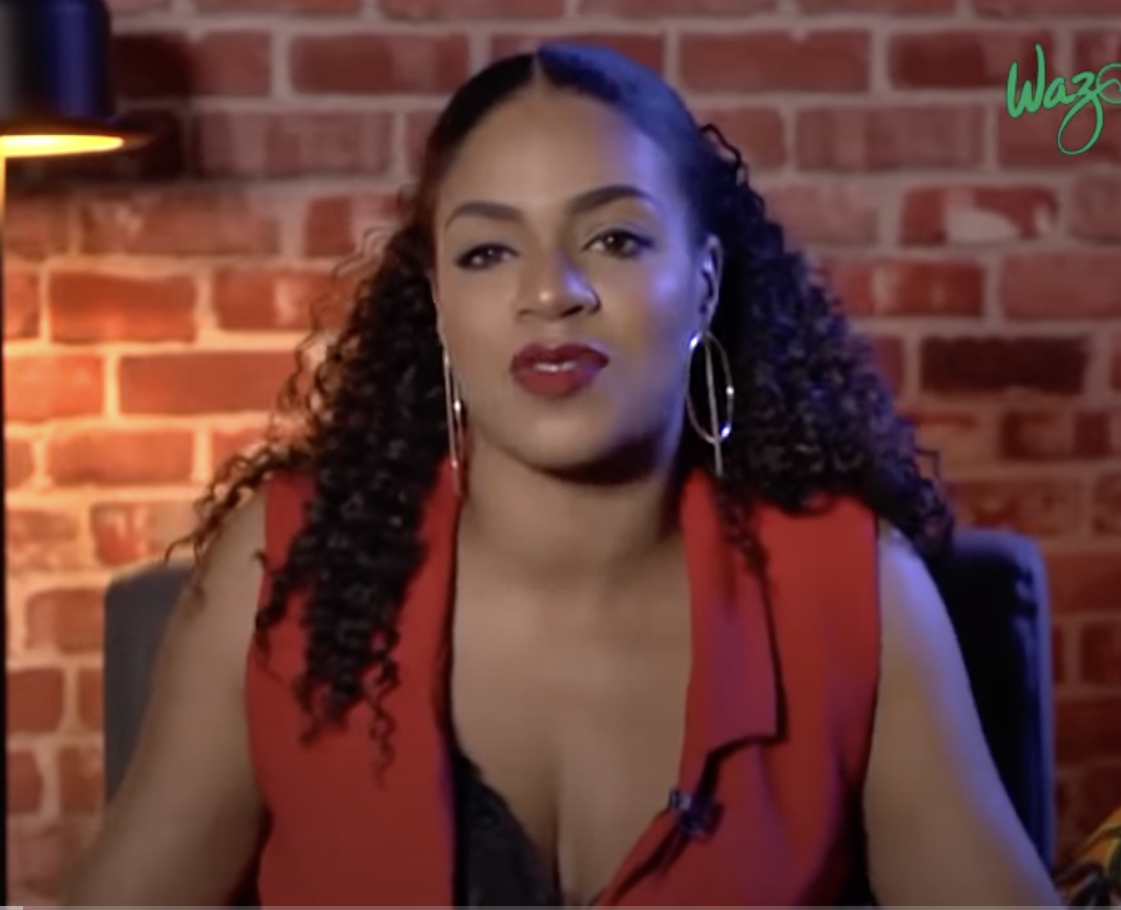
- Born: 1 January 1987 (age 39); Britain
- Occupations: Actress; Video vixen
- Known for: Mukulu video Big Brother Naija
- Spouse: Tena Terka (div. 2019)
- Children: 2
- Relatives: Neo Akpofure (cousin)

Venita Akpofure (born 1 January 1987) is a British-Nigerian actress and video vixen. She gained prominence as a housemate in the fourth season of Big Brother Naija. She played the lead role of Nengi in Africa Magic's Unmarried.

== Early life ==
Akpofure was born in the United Kingdom and also hails from Delta State in Nigeria. She grew up in Benin, Edo State where she attended Our Lady of Apostles for her primary school before returning to England. She studied accounting at Hertfordshire University in the United Kingdom.

== Career ==
Akpofure played the role of Mimi in AY Makun's Ay's Crib and also featured in 2Face Idibia's "Ihe Ne Me" and "Mukulu" by Skales as a video vixen. Prior to her stint in Big Brother Naija, she was best known for her role in "Mukulu".

She served as a brand ambassador for First City Monument Bank, Martini Rose and Mouka Foam. She is also an ambassador for Hawaii Soap, alongside Mercy Eke and Sophie Alakija.

She was a housemate on the fourth season of Big Brother Naija and was evicted on day 41 of the show making her the 11th of the 20 housemates to be evicted.

In July 2023, she was announced as one of the housemates for the eighth season of Big Brother Naija Allstars.

== Personal life ==
Akpofure is a mother of two and was married to Terna Tarka for four years. In a May 2021 interview with Punch, she stated that leaving her husband was one of the toughest decisions she had made and that she was grateful for her support system.

In 2020, Akpofure underwent breast augmentation surgery at Quartz Clinic, Istanbul. She spoke about her experience on her YouTube channel.

== Filmography ==
=== Music videos ===
Year	Song	Artist	Ref
2012	"Ihe Ne Me"	2Face Idibia	
2012	"Alingo"	Psquare	
	"Magician Remix"	Ice Prince	
	"Scoobi Doo" (ft eLDee)	Hakeem da Dream	
	"Finish Work"	Naeto C	
	"Mukulu"	Skales	
	"Shake Ur Bum"	Timaya	
	"Mo Fe Lo"	J-ROC	
	"Too Much Money" (feat Banky W)	IceBerg Slim	

=== Television ===
Year	Show	Role	Notes	Ref
2021	Nollywood Queens		alongside Nuella Njubigbo and Mimi Orjiekwe	
2020-21	Unmarried	Nengi		
2019	Big Brother Naija 4	Contestant	Evicted on day 41 of the show	
2020	Losing Control	Koko	13 episodes	
2023	Big Brother Naija 8 All Stars	Contestant	9th Place	

=== Films ===
Year	Title	Role	Ref
2024	The Silent Intruder	Carrie	
2022	Before Valentine's	Ama	
2021	My Village People	Princess	
2021	Mamba's Diamond	Rose	
2020	Kambili: The Whole 30 Yards	Biodun	
2015	While You Slept	Najite	
2013	Gold Diggin	Karen	

== Awards and nominations ==
Year	Award	Category	Result	Ref
2015	Golden Icons Academy Movie Awards	Best Supporting female	Nominated	
2021	Net Honours	Most Popular Actress	Nominated	

== See also ==
- List of Nigerian actors
