= Tope Adenibuyan =

- Also known as: Teddy A
- Born: Lagos, Nigeria
- Genres: Hip hop
- Occupations: Rapper; actor; singer; songwriter
- Spouse: Bamike Olawunmi

Tope Adenibuyan, popularly known as Teddy A, is a Nigerian-American rapper, actor, singer, songwriter and podcaster. He is known for his role in the film Foreigner's God.

== Early life and education ==
He was born in Lagos, Nigeria, and later relocated to the United States where he obtained a degree from the University of Texas.

== Musical career ==
Teddy A started his musical career in the United States and has released singles and collaborations with popular musicians such as Timaya, P-Square, Wizkid, and Flavour.

== Personal life ==
Teddy A is married to Bamike Olawunmi, his fellow housemate on Big Brother Nigeria. They have two children together, and he also has a son from a previous relationship.
