= Toyin Lawani =

Nigerian actress and fashion designer

Toyin Ajoke Muyinat Lawani-Adebayo, popularly known as Toyin Lawani, is a Nigerian celebrity, fashion designer, author, philanthropist, and serial entrepreneur. She is CEO of Tiannahs Place Empire, a group compromising 33 businesses. Lawani also served as a costume designer on King of Boys: The Return of the King and Shanty Town.

Tiannah's Empire, a reality television show that focused on her life was produced and distributed by EbonyLife Studio. She featured in the TV show, The Real Housewives of Lagos released on Showmax in 2022.

== Personal life ==
Toyin Lawani, born on March 1, 1982, is a self-taught fashion stylist and designer renowned for her unconventional and often controversial fashion style. She gained prominence after showcasing her clothing collections at Africa Fashion Week London in 2013.

She subsequently showcased her collections at Africa Fashion Week Nigeria and featured as a judge on the Nigeria's Next Top Designer reality television series. She is also Youth Ambassador for the Fashion Designers Association of Nigeria (FADAN).

In an interview with Chude Jideonwo, Lawani revealed that she was raped by her uncle at 15. In 2022, she announced the loss of her fourth pregnancy.

== Filmography ==
The Real Housewives of Lagos.

== Award ==
Year	Award	Category	Result	Ref.
2020	Nigerian Achievers Awards	Top 20 'Under 40' Entrepreneur/Game changer	Won	
