= Miracle Igbokwe =

Nigerian pilot, model and TV personality (born 1995)

- Ikechukwu
- Born: 17 February 1995 (age 31); Imo State, Nigeria
- Citizenship: Nigerian
- Education: Dee unique International High School
- Occupation: Aviation
- Known for: Winner of the Big Brother Naija season 3 premier edition
- Television: Big Brother Naija

Miracle Igbokwe (born 15 February 1995) is a Nigerian pilot and model from Imo State. He won season 3 of the Big Brother Naija reality TV show, which aired from 28 January to 22 April 2018. On 30 May 2018, Igbokwe received his ₦25 million cheque, a Hyundai SUV, and a trip for two to an exotic location.

== Early life and career ==
Igbokwe is from Imo State, Nigeria. He entered the Big Brother Naija house on 28 January 2018 and was announced as the winner on 22 April 2018.

On 30 April 2018, he was appointed ambassador of education by the Imo State governor, Rochas Okorocha. On 26 June 2019, he graduated from an aviation school in the United States.
