= Taiwo Odukoya =

Nigerian pentecostal pastor (1956–2023)

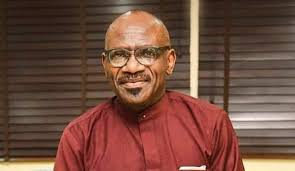
- Born: Daniel Taiwo Odukoya; 15 June 1956; Kaduna, Northern Region, Colony and Protectorate of Nigeria (now in Kaduna State, Nigeria)
- Died: 7 August 2023 (aged 67); United States
- Occupation: Pastor
- Website: www.tfolc.org

Daniel Taiwo Odukoya (15 June 1956 – 7 August 2023) was a Nigerian pentecostal pastor. He was the co-founder and senior pastor of The Fountain of Life Church, situated in Ilupeju, Lagos, and with a membership of over 8,000 people in the 2010s.

== Biography ==
Born 1956 in Kaduna, Nigeria, Odukoya went on to study petroleum engineering at the University of Ibadan. In 1980, Odukoya met Bimbo Williams at the University of Ibadan. They married on 3 November 1984 at the Yaba Baptist Church. They had three children; now pastors Tolu Odukoya-Ijogun (b. September 20, 1985) and Jimmy Odukoya (b. April 27, 1987), and Tobi Enuha (b. June 11, 1990).

On 10 December 2005, Bimbo Odukoya, along with 102 other people, died in the crash of Sosoliso Airlines Flight 1145. Five years later, on 5 January 2010, Taiwo Odukoya married Rosemary "Nomthi" Simangele Zulu from South Africa (1974-2021). They had two boys. Timilehin Odukoya (b. August 26, 2010)and Jomiloju Odukoya (b. December 8, 2011)

In 2014, nine years after the death of his first wife, Odukoya readdressed the matter of the plane crash that made him a widower. He claimed that pastors should use private jets: such aircraft better facilitate pastoral ministry and are a safer means of travel than commercial flights.

In November 2021, Odukoya lost his second wife to cancer. On 9 November, he said that she "battled cancer for the better part of two years".

A month after Nomthi died, Odukoya then lost his twin sister Kehinde Olufunmilayo Hassan née Odukoya on 26 December 2021, also to cancer.

Odukoya died in the United States on 7 August 2023 at the age of 67. Following Odukoya's death, his two eldest children Jimmy and Tolu, respectively became the Senior Pastor and the Associate Senior Pastor of the Fountain of Life Church, from September 2023.

== Literary works ==
He authored a number of books covering subjects including faith, personal development, leadership, relationships, and marriage.

== Legacy ==
Odukoya's work was primarily associated with the establishment and leadership of The Fountain of Life Church, which he founded in Lagos in 1992. Following his death in August 2023, leadership responsibilities at The Fountain of Life Church passed to his children, Jimmy Odukoya and Tolu Odukoya-Ijogun, who became senior pastor and associate senior pastor, respectively.

His name is also associated with the Daniel Taiwo Odukoya Memorial Lecture, an annual event established in his memory. The lecture has featured discussions on leadership, mentorship and social development.

== Outreaches ==
Odukoya proclaimed a belief in the role of the church in the community and expressed it through several outreach projects, including a hospital, an orphanage, a school for destitute children, a farm, a water project which provides boreholes at strategic locations for people who have no access to clean and portable water and a skill acquisition and entrepreneurial institute for the less privileged. On 19 April 1997, Odukoya set up Discovery for Men and Discovery for Women, non-denominational outreaches to men and women.
