= Bimbo Odukoya =

Nigerian Pastor and Televangelist (1960–2005)

- Born: Abimbola Rosemary Williams; 12 September 1960
- Died: 11 December 2005 (aged 45); Port Harcourt, Nigeria
- Occupation: Pastor

Abimbola Rosemary "Bimbo" Odukoya (nee Williams; 12 September 1960 – 11 December 2005) was a Nigerian pastor and televangelist who was married to her fellow co-founder of the Fountain of Life Church, Taiwo Odukoya.

Odukoya, often called "Pastor Bims", was a receiver of over 60 national and international awards for her contributions to nation building, the development of her country, Nigeria, and the West Africa sub region, and for leadership as a woman. She was one of several individuals chosen by Samsung to represent Nigeria in carrying the Olympic Torch in Athens, Greece, at the 2004 Olympic Games. She died as a result of the Sosoliso Airlines Flight 1145 crash.

== Life ==
Odukoya married the co-founding pastor of the Fountain of Life Church, Taiwo Odukoya (1956–2023) on 3 November 1984 at the Yaba Baptist Church, and together they had three children; now pastors Tolu Odukoya-Ijogun (b. 20 September 1985) and Jimmy Odukoya (b. 27 April 1987), and Tobi Odukoya-Enuha (b. 11 June 1990). Her two eldest children Jimmy and Tolu, are now respectively the senior pastor and the associate senior pastor of the Fountain of Life Church, following the demise of their father on 7 August 2023.

At the time of her death, Odukoya was the associate senior pastor of The Fountain of Life Church and the president of Discovery for Women.

She was the host of Single and Married, a television program that deals with practical issues people face in marriages and relationships.

== Death ==
Odukoya boarded Sosoliso Airlines Flight 1145, bound for Port Harcourt from Abuja. On 10 December 2005 the airliner crashed during landing at Port Harcourt International Airport; Bimbo survived the initial impact and died from injuries on 11 December 2005. Her mission church program continues in the management of her son Othniel Jimmy Odukoya.

== Books written ==
- How to Choose a Life Partner, by Bimbo Odukoya, Xulon Press (15 October 2005)
- Living Free, How to Handle Rejection by Bimbo Odukoya, Grace Springs Publishers, Inc., 2006
- Living Free, Overcoming Masturbation by Bimbo Odukoya, Grace Springs Publishers, Inc., 2006
- Marriage, Real People, Real Issues, Wise Counsel by Bimbo Odokoya, Grace Springs Publishers, Inc., 2006
