= Jimmy Odukoya =

Nigerian actor and pastor (born 1987)

- Born: Oluwajimi Odukoya; 27 April 1987 (age 39)
- Citizenship: Nigerian
- Education: Oral Roberts University
- Occupations: Actor, motivational speaker, preacher, musician
- Years active: 2016–present
- Notable work: Crazy Grannies; Husbands of Lagos; The Woman King
- Children: 2
- Parents: Bimbo Odukoya; Taiwo Odukoya

Oluwajimi Odukoya (born 27 April 1987) is a Nigerian actor, and the Former Senior pastor of the Fountain of Life Church, in Ilupeju, Lagos. He played the role of Oba Ade in the 2022 movie The Woman King alongside Viola Davis and John Boyega. Odukoya is the first son and second child of late pastors Bimbo Odukoya and Taiwo Odukoya. He succeeded his father after his father's demise, as the official senior pastor of the Fountain of Life Church, with his sister Tolu Odukoya-Ijogun confirmed as his associate senior pastor, both from September 2023.

He was removed as Senior Pastor of the Fountain of Life Church after a joint decision by the Church's board of trustees after the Board approached the Lagos High Court and filed a suit to that effect. The Court has ruled and henceforth barred Jimmy from parading himself as Senior Pastor of Fountain of Life Church, as his Father, The Late Pastor Taiwo Odukoya named another individual in a 2021 video as the Church's Successor. Jimmy is to remain a pastor of the Youth Church under the new Senior Pastor. Pastor Jimmy Odukoya restrained as Senior Pastor of Fountain of Life Church Court Restrains Jimmy Odukoya from acting as Senior Pastor

== Filmography ==
- Husbands of Lagos (2016) as Fred
- Tempted (2017) as Mike
- Ordinary People (2017) as Andrew
- Baby Palaver (2018)
- Cooked Up Love (2018) as Abbey
- The Bosslady (2019) as Mike
- The Bling Lagosians (2019) as George
- Faded Lines (2020) as Femi
- Daydream (2020) as Ethan
- The Wait (2021) as Akin
- Crazy Grannies (2021) as Adam
- Mamba's Diamond (2021) as Jay
- I am Nazzy (2022)
- The Woman King (2022) as Oba Ade
- Baby Bump (2022) as Esosa
- A Ride Too Far (2023) as Jide
- Broken Mirror (2023) as Emma
- Lock 'N Keys (2023) as Johnny
- Safe (2024) as Big D
