= Denrele Edun =

Nigerian television host (born 1981)

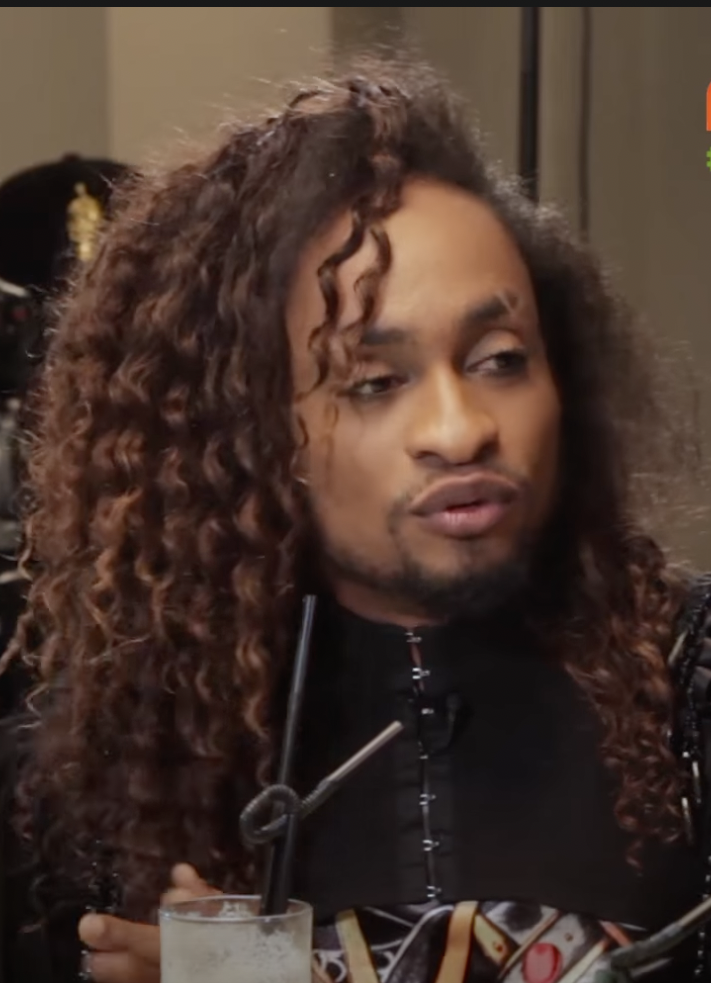
- Born: Adenrele Oluwafemi Edun; 13 June 1981 (age 45); Hamburg, Germany
- Education: University of Lagos
- Occupation: Television personality
- Years active: 1995–present

Adenrele Oluwafemi Edun, popularly known as Denrele (born 3 June 1981), is a Nigerian television presenter, actor, model, and dancer who has been recognized with many awards including The Best TV Personality at the NEAs in New York 2011, Dynamix Award for Best Youth TV Personality 2006/2007/2008, The Future Award for Best Producer 2007.

== Early life ==
Denrele was born in Hamburg, Germany, to a Nigerian Yoruba father and an Indian-Mauritian mother. He is the only son and has two sisters. His family claims descent from the colonial statesman Adegboyega Edun.

He grew up in Germany and came to Nigeria when he was five where he attended St Gregory's College, Ikoyi and the University of Lagos.

He was Lead dancer/choreographer for "The Iroko Band' managed by filmmaker, Dr Ola Balogun and later became a Backup dancer for LexyDoo, Ruggedman, Jazzman Olofin, 2Shotz, Lady Di and also "Stage Shakers".

== Career ==
Denrele is known for his fashion style and personality. He started his television career as an actor at eleven when he played TV presenter/producer Dubem Ike on NTA Network's Kiddivision 101. As an undergraduate at the University of Lagos he went into modelling, and after graduation, he joined Sound City as a TV presenter. Denrele studied English Education at the University of Lagos; it was during this period he had a starring role in the campus based comedy Twilight Zone, and a recurring role as music producer X in the sitcom Everyday People.

Denrele is an entertainment personality whose style has been described as "punk and fun". In an interview with ModernGhana, he stated "I am just expressing my individuality. Most people ask me that question and I would say I just want to be me. Some people think I dress (cross-dressing) like this to attract attention, but I have always had attention from childhood".

Denrele has won 16 awards and over 30 nominations in his career. He has previously worked with SoundCity before he quit and moved on to become one of Channel O's VJs.

Denrele has interviewed the likes of Akon, Beyoncé Knowles, Tyler Perry, Lil' Kim, Snoop Dogg, Cuba Gooding, Amerie, and Lloyd. Edun hosted the movie premiere of Hoodrush. Denrele has also been credited for being one of the brains behind the success of Big Brother Amplified Winner Karen Igho.

Denrele Edun and other A-list celebrities starred in the Nollywood movie Make a Move. The movie features artistes like Omawumi, 2face Idibia etc. It was directed by Niyi Akinmolayan and premiered on 6 June 2014.

== Filmography ==
- Move Like a Boss (2024)
- I am Nazzy (2022)
- Blood Sisters (2022) as Drunk Driver
- Moms at War (2018) as Fitness Instructor
- Excess Luggage (2017) as Andrew

== Personal life ==
In 2013, he took to his twitter page to announce that he was robbed and everything was carted away by the robbers, putting his grandmother and father in shock.

== Awards ==
Year	Event	Prize	Result
2006	Dynamix Award	Best Youth TV Personality	Won
2007	Dynamix Award	Best Youth TV Personality	Won
2007	The Future Award	Best Producer	Won
2008	Dynamix Award	Best Youth TV Personality	Won
2008	City People Awards	Most Popular TV presenter in Nigeria	Won
2011	Nigeria Entertainment Awards	Best TV Personality	Won

== See also ==
- James Brown (internet personality)
