= Big Brother Naija season 11 =

Nigeria television show

Big Brother Naija
- Season 11
- Presented by: Ebuka Obi-Uchendu
- No. of days: 72
- No. of housemates: 24
- Winner: Temitope "Temi Nkem" Chigbue
- Runner-up: Amyr "Aikou" Yousufzai

Release
- Original network: Africa Magic
- Original release: 26 July 2026 – present

Season chronology
- ← Previous; Season 10

Big Brother Naija season 11, also known as Big Brother Naija: Show Ya Sef, is the eleventh season of the Nigerian version of the reality television franchise Big Brother. The season premiered on 26 July 2026 on DStv channel 198 and GOtv channel 29. Ebuka Obi-Uchendu returned as host for his tenth consecutive season.

According to the show's organisers, MultiChoice, the winner will receive a grand prize valued at ₦160 million, comprising cash and prizes provided by the programme's sponsors.

== Audition ==
A physical audition was held from 16 to 20 May 2026 to select contestants for the season. Prospective contestants were required to register online, provide their personal details, and select a preferred audition date, time, and venue for an in-person audition in Lagos, Enugu, or Abuja.

== Housemates ==
Housemates	Age on entry	Occupation	Residence/Birthplace	Day entered	Day exited	Status
Temitope "Temi Nkem" Chigbue	21	Undergraduate	Delta State/London	0	70	Winner
Amyr "Aikou" Yousufzai	25	Freelance teacher/web developer	Abuja	0	70	Runner-up
Faith "Sheba" Gamde	32	Broadcaster	Plateau State	0	70	Third; Place
Usaku "Bluethopia" Bantai	22	Photographer/model	Adamawa State	0	70	Fourth Place
Joshua "Tram" Alekewumu	24	Entrepreneur	Lagos State	0	70	Fifth; Place
Flora Egbedi	30	Make-up artist	Delta State	0	70	Sixth; Place
Patrick "Ricky" Jumbo	33	Writer	Rivers State	0	70	Seventh Place
Oyindamola "Oyin" Oshikoya	22	Sales entrepreneur	Ogun State	0	70	Eighth Place
Muudumbari "Barry" Pop-Yornwin	26	Civil engineer/fashion designer	Abuja	0	70	Ninth Place
Victor "Keivo" Ikpe	27	Web developer	Benue State	0	64	Ejected
Chimsom "Chimsom Chuka" Chuka-Okoli	27	Pharmacist/actor	Anambra State	0	56	Evicted
Isabella "Bells" Imoh	22	Undergraduate	Akwa Ibom State	0	56	Evicted
Yusuf Muhammed-Awal	25	Actor	Kogi State	0	56	Evicted
Oluwaseyifunmi "Araga" Sosanya	29	Fashion model	Ogun State	0	49	Evicted
Abisola "Abi" Ayoola	25	Model/chef	Osun State/Lagos State	0	49	Evicted
Whitney "Nomy" Chukwu	26	Fashion designer	Anambra State	0	43	Ejected
Gerard Adebaji	23	Actor/content creator	Lagos State	0	42	Evicted
Lovette "Goddessa" Okechukwu	30	Musician	Abia State	0	35	Evicted
Sultan "Sultex" Aregbe Obanikoro	24	Dancer	Lagos	0	35	Evicted
Ezenwoke "Cassi" Nwosu	26	Forex trader/actor	Abia State	0	28	Evicted
Chinecherem "Neche" Maduagwu	25	Lawyer	Anambra State	0	21	Walked
Kamsy Uzoma	24	Event planner	Imo State	0	21	Evicted
Ijeoma "Mercedes" Emi	26	Massage therapist	Delta State	0	14	Evicted
Martins Iyeh	30	Model	Kogi State	0	14	Evicted

== Voting history and nominations table ==
	Week 1	Week 2	Week 3	Week 4	Week 5	Week 6	Week 7	Week 8	Week 9	Week 10 Final		Nominations & votes received
Head of House	Chimsom Chuka	Sheba	Neche	Abi	Chimsom Chuka	Abi	Tram	Barry	Keivo	Barry		Nominations & votes received
Deputy Head of House	Abi	none	none	Chimsom Chuka	none	none	none	none	none	none		Nominations & votes received
Temi Nkem	Sultex; Ricky	Keivo; Goddessa; Araga	Abi; Keivo; Gerard	Ineligible	Goddessa; Sheba	Araga; Chimsom Chuka	No; Voting	No; Voting	No; Voting	Winner; Day 70		15
Aikou	Nomy; Goddessa	Barry; Ricky; Abi	Barry; Ricky; Sheba	Temi Nkem; Bluethopia	Keivo; Sheba	Barry; Keivo	No; Voting	No; Voting	No; Voting	Runnerr Up; Day 70		12
Sheba	Ricky; Oyin	Chimsom Chuka; Tram; Goddessa	Tram; Goddessa; Ricky	Goddessa; Tram	Bluethopia; Goddessa	Araga; Temi Nkem	No; Voting	No; Voting	No; Voting	Third Place; Day 70		12
Bluethopia	Ricky; Keivo	Neche; Kamsy; Barry	Kamsy; Sultex; Abi	Ineligible	Goddessa; Sheba	Chimsom Chuka; Gerard	No; Voting	No; Voting	No; Voting	Fourth Place; Day 70		21
Tram	Flora; Mercedes	Barry; Cassi; Goddessa	Sheba; Cassi; Ricky	Ineligible	Barry; Sheba	Flora; Ricky	Head of House	No; Voting	No; Voting	Fifth Place; Day 70		16
Flora	Cassi; Sultex	Mercedes; Bells; Oyin	Oyin; Bells; Sultex	Bells; Bluethopia	Oyin; Tram	Oyin; Tram	No; Voting	No; Voting	No; Voting	Sixth Place; Day 70		10
Ricky	Cassi; Suited	Tram; Bells; Bluethopia	Sheba; Keivo; Aikou	Bells; Bluethopia	Tram; Yusuf	Aikou; Tram	No; Voting	No; Voting	No; Voting	Seventh Place; Day 70		16
Oyin	Tram; Yusuf	Flora; Bells; Mercedes	Flora; Bells; Sultex	Bells; Gerard	Flora; Sultex	Flora; Tram	No; Voting	No; Voting	No; Voting	Eighth Place; Day 70		12
Barry	Oyin; Bells	Keivo; Cassi; Flora	Bluethopia; Cassi; Keivo	Bluethopia; Tram	Aikou; Keivo	Aikou; Keivo	No; Voting	Head of House	No; Voting	Ninth Place; Day 70		9
Keivo	Bells; Martins	Temi Nkem; Barry; Martins	Temi Nkem; Sultex; Ricky	Bells; Bluethopia	Aikou; Barry	Chimsom Chuka; Nomy	No; Voting	No; Voting	Head of House	Ejected (Day 64)		16
Chimsom Chuka	Abi; Gerard	Goddessa; Kamsy; Yusuf	Cassi; Bluethopia; Sheba	Deputy; Head of House	Bluethopia; Goddessa	Bluethopia; Temi Nkem	No; Voting	No; Voting	Evicted (Day 56)			4
Bells	Nomy; Goddessa	Flora; Oyin; Ricky	Ricky; Yusuf; Sultex	Ineligible	Ricky; Yusuf	Oyin; Yusuf	No; Voting	No; Voting	Evicted (Day 56)			18
Yusuf	Nomy; Bells	Martins; Gerard; Bells	Gerard; Goddessa; Araga	Bells; Gerard	Araga; Ricky	Araga; Flora	No; Voting	No; Voting	Evicted (Day 56)			13
Araga	Cassi; Ricky	Gerard; Keivo; Abi	Yusuf; Goddessa; Gerard	Goddessa; Gerard	Temi Nkem; Yusuf	Gerard; Temi Nkem	No; Voting	Evicted (Day 49)				14
Abi	Goddessa; Temi Nkem	Temi Nkem; Goddessa; Araga	Araga; Bluethopia; Kamsy	Bells; Bluethopia	Aikou; Nomy	Bluethopia; Temi Nkem	No; Voting	Evicted (Day 49)				9
Nomy	Tram; Sheba	Temi Nkem; Goddessa; Cassi	Cassi; Aikou; Gerard	Ineligible	Aikou; Keivo	Aikou; Keivo	Ejected (Day 43)					6
Gerard	Bells; Mercedes	Yusuf; Martins; Araga	Araga; Cassi; Yusuf	Ineligible	Araga; Bluethopia	Aikou; Araga	Evicted (Day 42)					18
Goddessa	Bells; Ricky	Araga; Tram; Abi	Yusuf; Araga; Sheba	Ineligible	Sheba; Temi Nkem	Evicted (Day 35)						18
Sultex	Ricky; Gerard	Oyin; Keivo; Bluethopia	Oyin; Keivo; Bluethopia	Ineligible	Gerard; Oyin	Evicted (Day 35)						10
Cassi	Temi Nkem; Abi	Temi Nkem; Barry; Tram	Gerard; Tram; Yusuf	Ineligible	Evicted (Day 28)							14
Neche	Ricky; Oyin	Bluethopia; Tram; Cassi	Bluethopia; Kamsy; Cassi	Walked (Day 21)								2
Kamsy	Aikou; Nomy	Bluethopia; Neche; Gerard	Gerard; Bluethopia; Cassi	Evicted (Day 21)								5
Mercedes	Sheba; Aikou	Flora; Bells; Abi	Evicted (Day 14)									4
Martins	Keivo; Sultex	Gerard; Yusuf; Abi	Evicted (Day 14)									4
Note	1			2					No; Eviction			
Nominated	Abi; Aikou; Araga; Barry; Bells; Bluethopia; Cassi; Flora; Gerard; Goddessa; Kamsy; Keivo; Martins; Mercedes; Neche; Nomy; Oyin; Ricky; Sheba; Sultex; Temi Nkem; Tram; Yusuf	Abi; Araga; Barry; Bells; Bluethopia; Cassi; Chimsom Chuka; Gerard; Goddessa; Kamsy; Keivo; Martins; Mercedes; Neche; Nomy; Oyin; Ricky; Sultex; Temi Nkem; Tram; Yusuf	Abi; Araga; Barry; Bells; Bluethopia; Cassi; Chimsom Chuka; Gerard; Goddessa; Kamsy; Keivo; Nomy; Oyin; Ricky; Sheba; Sultex; Temi Nkem; Tram; Yusuf	Bells; Bluethopia; Cassi; Gerard; Goddessa; Nomy; Sultex; Temi Nkem; Tram	Abi; Araga; Barry; Bells; Bluethopia; Gerard; Goddessa; Keivo; Nomy; Oyin; Ricky; Sheba; Sultex; Temi Nkem; Tram; Yusuf	Aikou; Araga; Barry; Bells; Bluethopia; Chimsom Chuka; Flora; Gerard; Keivo; Oyin; Ricky; Sheba; Temi Nkem; Tram; Yusuf	Abi; Aikou; Araga; Barry; Bells; Bluethopia; Chimsom Chuka; Flora; Keivo; Oyin; Ricky; Sheba; Temi Nkem; Yusuf	Aikou; Bells; Bluethopia; Chimsom Chuka; Flora; Keivo; Oyin; Ricky; Sheba; Temi Nkem; Tram; Yusuf	No; Eviction			
Saved	none	Barry; Bells; ~~Cassi~~; Chimsom Chuka; Goddessa; Tram	Bluethopia; Cassi; Chimsom Chuka; ~~Gerard~~	~~Araga~~; Bells; Bluethopia; Chimsom Chuka; Sultex; ~~Yusuf~~	Abi; ~~Goddessa~~; Sheba	Sheba	Keivo	Aikou	No; Eviction			
Against Public Vote	Abi; Aikou; Araga; Barry; Bells; Bluethopia; Cassi; Flora; Gerard; Goddessa; Kamsy; Keivo; Martins; Mercedes; Neche; Nomy; Oyin; Ricky; Sheba; Sultex; Temi Nkem; Tram; Yusuf	Abi; Araga; Bluethopia; Cassi; Gerard; Kamsy; Keivo; Martins; Mercedes; Neche; Nomy; Oyin; Ricky; Sultex; Temi Nkem; Yusuf	Abi; Araga; Barry; Bells; Gerard; Goddessa; Kamsy; Keivo; Nomy; Oyin; Ricky; Sheba; Sultex; Temi Nkem; Tram; Yusuf	Araga; Cassi; Gerard; Goddessa; Nomy; Temi Nkem; Tram; Yusuf	Araga; Barry; Bells; Bluethopia; Gerard; Goddessa; Keivo; Nomy; Oyin; Ricky; Sultex; Temi Nkem; Tram; Yusuf	Aikou; Araga; Barry; Bells; Bluethopia; Chimsom Chuka; Flora; Gerard; Keivo; Oyin; Ricky; Temi Nkem; Tram; Yusuf	Abi; Aikou; Araga; Barry; Bells; Bluethopia; Chimsom Chuka; Flora; Oyin; Ricky; Sheba; Temi Nkem; Yusuf	Bells; Bluethopia; Chimsom Chuka; Flora; Keivo; Oyin; Ricky; Sheba; Temi Nkem; Tram; Yusuf	No; Eviction	Aikou; Barry; Bluethopia; Flora; ~~Keivo~~; Oyin; Ricky; Sheba; Temi Nkem; Tram		
Walked	none		Neche	none					No; Eviction	none		
Ejected	none					Nomy	none		No; Eviction	Keivo		
Evicted	Flora; 29.18% votes to become The Gambit	Martins; 1.25% votes to save	Kamsy; 2.41% votes to save	Cassi; 5.27% votes to save	Sultex; 4.77% votes to save	Gerard; 3.84% votes to save	Abi; 2.63% votes to save	Bells; 6.57% votes to save	No; Eviction	Barry; 3.53% votes to win	Oyin; 5.23% votes to win	
Evicted	Flora; 29.18% votes to become The Gambit	Martins; 1.25% votes to save	Kamsy; 2.41% votes to save	Cassi; 5.27% votes to save	Sultex; 4.77% votes to save	Gerard; 3.84% votes to save	Abi; 2.63% votes to save	Yusuf; 6.77% votes to save	No; Eviction	Ricky; 7.32% votes to win	Flora; 7.71% votes to win	
Evicted	Aikou; 9.10% votes to become The Gambit	Mercedes; 2.29% votes to save	Kamsy; 2.41% votes to save	Cassi; 5.27% votes to save	Goddessa; 5.02% votes to save	Gerard; 3.84% votes to save	Araga; 4.83% votes to save	Yusuf; 6.77% votes to save	No; Eviction	Tram; 8.36% votes to win	Bluethopia; 8.50% votes to win	
Evicted	Aikou; 9.10% votes to become The Gambit	Mercedes; 2.29% votes to save	Kamsy; 2.41% votes to save	Cassi; 5.27% votes to save	Goddessa; 5.02% votes to save	Gerard; 3.84% votes to save	Araga; 4.83% votes to save	Chimsom Chuka; 6.90% votes to save	No; Eviction	Sheba; 9.80% votes to win	Aikou; 23.68% votes to win	
Survived	Ricky; 7.18% votes to become The Gambit; Abi; 6.87% votes to become The Gambit; Araga; Barry; Bells; Bluethopia; Cassi; Gerard; Goddessa; Kamsy; Keivo; Martins; Mercedes; Neche; Nomy; Oyin; Sheba; Sultex; Temi Nkem; Tram; Yusuf; Unknown split of 47.67%	Keivo; 2.92% votes to save Abi; Araga; Bluethopia; Cassi; Gerard; Kamsy; Keivo; Neche; Nomy; Oyin; Ricky; Sultex; Temi Nkem; Yusuf; Unknown split of 93.54%	Araga; 3.29% votes to save Gerard; 3.53% votes to save Abi; Araga; Barry; Bells; Gerard; Goddessa; Keivo; Nomy; Oyin; Ricky; Sheba; Sultex; Temi Nkem; Tram; Yusuf; Unknown split of 90.77%	Goddessa; 6.76% votes to save Nomy; 10.84% votes to save Araga; Gerard; Temi Nkem; Tram; Yusuf; Unknown split of 77.13%	Bells; 5.22% votes to save Araga; Barry; Bluethopia; Gerard; Keivo; Nomy; Oyin; Ricky; Temi Nkem; Tram; Yusuf; Unknown split of 84.99%	Barry; 4.06% votes to save Yusuf; 4.23% votes to save Aikou; Araga; Bells; Bluethopia; Chimsom Chuka; Flora; Keivo; Oyin; Ricky; Temi Nkem; Tram; Unknown split of 87.87%	Bluethopia; 5.40% votes to save Aikou; Barry; Bells; Chimsom Chuka; Flora; Oyin; Ricky; Sheba; Temi Nkem; Yusuf; Unknown split of 87.14%	Tram; 7.66% votes to save Bluethopia; Flora; Keivo; Oyin; Ricky; Sheba; Temi Nkem; Unknown split of 72.10%	No; Eviction	Temi Nkem; 25.87% votes to win		

=== Notes ===
- ^Note 1: Big Brother announced that the male and female housemates who received the most votes during Week 1 Public Vote would become the Gambit, they remain regular housemates, compete in all tasks and automatically make it to the finale, but they would be ineligible to win the grand prize.
- ^Note 2: The remaining 20 housemates were divided into two teams. The Week's Head of House earned immunity for her team and the right for each of her team members to vote to save two of the housemates from the losing team for possible eviction. The two housemates from the losing team who received the most votes were saved from possible eviction.
