= Big Brother Naija season 10 =

Nigeria television show

Big Brother Naija
- Season 10
- Presented by: Ebuka Obi-Uchendu
- No. of days: 72
- No. of housemates: 29
- Winner: Opeyemi "Imisi" Ayanwale
- Runner-up: Precious "Dede" Ashiogwu

Release
- Original network: Africa Magic
- Original release: 26 July – 5 October 2025

Season chronology
- ← Previous; Season 9 Next → Season 11

Big Brother Naija Season 10 also known as Big Brother Naija: 10/10 is the tenth season of the Nigerian version of the reality show Big Brother. It premiered on Saturday 26 July and Sunday 27 July 2025 on DStv channel 198 and GOtv channel 49. Ebuka Obi-Uchendu returned as the host for the ninth consecutive time.

According to the organizers of the show MultiChoice, the winner of the season is expected to win a total of ₦150 million grand prize which includes cash and prizes from sponsors.

== Audition ==
An audition was held to select contestants for the show from 16 May 2025 to 18 May 2025. Interested contestants were told to appear in person in Lagos, Enugu, or Abuja to showcase why they should be selected for the show.

== Housemates ==
Housemates	Age on entry	Occupation	Residence/Birthplace	Day entered	Day exited	Status
Opeyemi "Imisi" Ayanwale	26	Fashion designer/actress	Oyo State	0A	70	Won
Precious "Dede" Ashiogwu	23	Aspiring entrepreneur	Delta State	0A	70	Runner-up
Koyinsola "Koyin" Samod Sanusi	22	Model	Ogun State	0B	70	3rd Place
Farida "Sultana" Ibrahim Auduson	26	Model	Adamawa State	0A	70	4th Place
Kolapo "Kola" Omotosho	28	Quality assurance analyst	Ekiti State	0B	70	5th Place
James "Jason Jae" Ayomide	29	Creative director	Ondo State	0B	70	6th Place
Mensan-Awaji James	29	Lawyer	Rivers State	0B	70	7th Place
Esther "Isabella" Georgewill	29	Entrepreneur	Rivers State	0A	70	8th Place
Kayode "Kaybobo" Oladele	26	Professional American football player	Ekiti State	0B	70	9th Place
Faith Adewale	25	Doctor	Osun State	0B	67	Ejected
Olakunle "Rooboy" Kayode Samuel	30	Hypeman	Ogun State	0B	63	Evicted
Elizabeth "Zita" Oloruntola	24	Actress	Ogun State	0A	63	Evicted
Ayomide "Mide" Iwasokun	23	Entrepreneur	Ondo State	0A	63	Evicted
Unekwuojo "Kuture" Godswill Ameh	27	Fashion designer	Kogi State	0B	56	Evicted
Josephine "Joanna" Iwoh	21	Entrepreneur	Benue State	0A	56	Evicted
Bright "Bright Morgan" Mbata	27	Actor	Imo State	0B	55	Evicted
Thelma Lawson	26	Influencer/Entrepreneur	Rivers State	0A	55	Evicted
Uchenna "Tracy" Ekwe	27	Graduate trainee	Anambra State	0A	49	Evicted
Ekwenem "Denari" Arinze	27	Self-employed	Anambra State	0B	49	Evicted
Doris Okorie	34	Content creator	Imo State	0A	42	Evicted
Ifeyinwa "Ivatar" Adewumi	37	Media personality	Anambra State	0A	42	Evicted
Sonia "Big Soso" Amako	28	Lawyer/Chef	Kaduna State/UK	0A	42	Evicted
Nicole "Gigi Jasmine" Simon-Ogan	31	DJ	Akwa Ibom State	0A	28	Evicted
Victory Okokon	28	Psychologist	Akwa Ibom State	0B	28	Evicted
Oluwakayikunmi "Kayikunmi" Ajibade	25	Banker	Ekiti State	0B	21	Evicted
Oghenetega "Otega" Eritomi	35	Professional chef	Delta State	0B	21	Evicted
Sabrina Idukpaye	32	Actor	Edo State	0A	15	Walked
Ibifubara Davies	27	Psychologist/Therapist	Rivers State	0A	14	Evicted
Daniel "Danboskid" Olatunji	25	Model	Ekiti State	0B	14	Evicted

The 1st launch night (26 July) is marked as Day 0A. The 2nd launch night (27 July) is marked as Day 0B. The day after is Day 1.

== Voting history and nominations table ==
	Week 1	Week 2	Week 3	Week 4	Week 5	Week 6	Week 7	Week 8	Week 9	Week 10 Final		Nominations & votes received
Interim Head of House	Jason Jae	Thelma Lawson	Tracy	Doris	Jason Jae	Sultana	Faith	Koyin	Faith	None		Nominations & votes received
Head of House Challengers	Bright Morgan; Dede; Kuture; Rooboy; Sultana	Danboskid; Dede; Ivatar; Jason Jae; Victory	Dede; Ivatar; Joanna; Kuture; Thelma Lawson	Denari; Isabella; Ivatar; Jason Jae; Zita	Bright Morgan; Dede; Koyin; Kuture; Rooboy	Dede; Faith; Imisi; Ivatar; Koyin	Bright Morgan; Kaybobo; Koyin; Jason Jae; Thelma Lawson	Bright Morgan; Faith; Kola; Thelma Lawson; Zita	Dede; Kola; Koyin; Mide; Sultana	None		Nominations & votes received
Head of House	Jason Jae	Victory	Tracy	Zita	Rooboy	Faith	Thelma Lawson	Zita	Sultana	Jason Jae		Nominations & votes received
Imisi	Otega; Ivatar	No; Voting	No; Voting	No; Voting	~~Faith~~; ~~Zita~~	No; Voting	No; Voting	No; Voting	No; Voting	Winner; Day 70		8
Dede	Kaybobo; Isabella	No; Voting	No; Voting	No; Voting	~~Sultana~~; ~~Big Soso~~	No; Voting	Fake Evicted; Day 43	No; Voting	No; Voting	Runner Up; Day 70		4
Koyin	Kayikunmi; Isabella	No; Voting	No; Voting	No; Voting	~~Isabella~~; ~~Sultana~~	No; Voting	No; Voting	No; Voting	No; Voting	Third Place; Day 70		4
Sultana	Kayikunmi; Mide	No; Voting	No; Voting	No; Voting	~~Bright Morgan~~; ~~Zita~~	No; Voting	No; Voting	No; Voting	Head Of House	Fourth Place; Day 70		4
Kola	Denari; Koyin	No; Voting	No; Voting	No; Voting	~~Jason Jae~~; ~~Doris~~	No; Voting	No; Voting	No; Voting	No; Voting	Fifth Place; Day 70		1
Jason Jae	Kayikunmi; Imisi	No; Voting	No; Voting	No; Voting	~~Thelma Lawson~~; Faith	No; Voting	No; Voting	No; Voting	No; Voting	Sixth Place; Day 70		2
Mensan	Kaybobo; Otega	No; Voting	No; Voting	No; Voting	~~Ivatar~~; ~~Sultana~~	No; Voting	No; Voting	No; Voting	No; Voting	Seventh Place; Day 70		4
Isabella	Zita; Otega	No; Voting	No; Voting	No; Voting	~~Sultana~~; ~~Joanna~~	No; Voting	No; Voting	No; Voting	No; Voting	Eighth Place; Day 70		7
Kaybobo	Koyin; Victory	No; Voting	No; Voting	No; Voting	~~Tracy~~; ~~Koyin~~	No; Voting	No; Voting	No; Voting	No; Voting	Ninth Place; Day 70		4
Faith	Isabella; Rooboy	No; Voting	No; Voting	No; Voting	~~Ivatar~~; ~~Denari~~	Head Of House	No; Voting	No; Voting	No; Voting	Ejected (Day 67)		5
Rooboy	Mensan; Imisi	No; Voting	No; Voting	No; Voting	~~Imisi~~; ~~Isabella~~	No; Voting	Fake Evicted; Day 43	No; Voting	No; Voting	Evicted (Day 63)		1
Zita	Sabrina; Denari	No; Voting	No; Voting	Head Of House	~~Mide~~; ~~Denari~~	No; Voting	No; Voting	Head Of House	No; Voting	Evicted (Day 63)		10
Mide	Denari; Mensan	No; Voting	No; Voting	No; Voting	~~Zita~~; ~~Faith~~	No; Voting	No; Voting	No; Voting	No; Voting	Evicted (Day 63)		5
Kuture	Imisi; Zita	No; Voting	No; Voting	No; Voting	~~Ivatar~~; ~~Faith~~	No; Voting	No; Voting	No; Voting	Evicted (Day 56)			3
Joanna	Zita; Denari	No; Voting	No; Voting	No; Voting	~~Kaybobo~~; ~~Tracy~~	No; Voting	Fake Evicted; Day 43	No; Voting	Evicted (Day 56)			1
Bright Morgan	Imisi; Danboskid	No; Voting	No; Voting	No; Voting	~~Faith~~; ~~Zita~~	No; Voting	No; Voting	No; Voting	Evicted (Day 55)			1
Thelma Lawson	Danboskid; Otega	No; Voting	No; Voting	No; Voting	~~Jason Jae~~; ~~Koyin~~	No; Voting	Head Of House	No; Voting	Evicted (Day 55)			4
Tracy	Mensan; Kayikunmi	No; Voting	Head Of House	No; Voting	~~Kaybobo~~; ~~Imisi~~	No; Voting	No; Voting	Evicted (Day 49)				4
Denari	Dede; Mide	No; Voting	No; Voting	No; Voting	~~Kuture~~; ~~Kola~~	No; Voting	No; Voting	Evicted (Day 49)				8
Doris	Thelma Lawson; Denari	No; Voting	No; Voting	No; Voting	~~Thelma Lawson~~; ~~Tracy~~	No; Voting	Evicted (Day 42)					2
Ivatar	Dede; Mide	No; Voting	No; Voting	No; Voting	~~Kuture~~; ~~Thelma Lawson~~	No; Voting	Evicted (Day 42)					5
Big Soso	Denari; Mide	No; Voting	No; Voting	No; Voting	~~Dede~~; ~~Ivatar~~	No; Voting	Evicted (Day 42)					2
Gigi Jasmine	Imisi; Zita	No; Voting	No; Voting	No; Voting	Evicted (Day 28)							0
Victory	Doris; Isabella	Head Of House	No; Voting	No; Voting	Evicted (Day 28)							1
Kayikunmi	Tracy; Dede	No; Voting	No; Voting	Evicted (Day 21)								4
Otega	Imisi; Mensan	No; Voting	No; Voting	Evicted (Day 21)								5
Sabrina	Big Soso; Zita	No; Voting	Walked (Day 15)									1
Ibifubara	Zita; Otega	No; Voting	Evicted (Day 14)									0
Danboskid	Kuture; Isabella	No; Voting	Evicted (Day 14)									2
Note	No; Eviction		1	2	No; Eviction		3	4	5			
Nominated	No; Eviction	Big Soso; Bright Morgan; Danboskid; Dede; Denari; Doris; Faith; Gigi Jasmine; Ibifubara; Imisi; Isabella; Ivatar; Jason Jae; Joanna; Kaybobo; Kayikunmi; Kola; Koyin; Kuture; Mensan; Mide; Otega; Rooboy; Sabrina; Sultana; Thelma Lawson; Tracy; Zita	Big Soso; Bright Morgan; Dede; Denari; Doris; Faith; Gigi Jasmine; Imisi; Isabella; Ivatar; Jason Jae; Joanna; Kaybobo; Kayikunmi; Kola; Koyin; Kuture; Mensan; Mide; Otega; Sultana; Thelma Lawson; Victory; Zita	Big Soso; Bright Morgan; Dede; Denari; Doris; Faith; Gigi Jasmine; Imisi; Isabella; Ivatar; Jason Jae; Joanna; Kaybobo; Kola; Koyin; Kuture; Mensan; Mide; Sultana; Thelma Lawson; Tracy; Victory	No; Eviction	Big Soso; Bright Morgan; Dede; Denari; Doris; Imisi; Isabella; Ivatar; Jason Jae; Joanna; Kaybobo; Kola; Koyin; Kuture; Mensan; Mide; Rooboy; Sultana; Thelma Lawson; Tracy; Zita	Bright Morgan; Denari; Faith; Imisi; Isabella; Ivatar; Jason Jae; Kaybobo; Kola; Koyin; Kuture; Mensan; Mide; Sultana; Tracy; Zita	Bright Morgan; Dede; Faith; Imisi; Isabella; Jason Jae; Joanna; Kaybobo; Kola; Koyin; Kuture; Mensan; Mide; Rooboy; Sultana; Thelma Lawson	Dede; Faith; Imisi; Isabella; Jason Jae; Kaybobo; Kola; Koyin; Mensan; Mide; Rooboy; Zita	None		
Saved	No; Eviction	Kayikunmi	Kuture; Rooboy	Faith; Jason Jae; Mensan	No; Eviction	Mensan; Zita	Kaybobo	Faith; Imisi; Rooboy	Kaybobo; Mensan	None		
Against Public Vote	No; Eviction	Big Soso; Bright Morgan; Danboskid; Dede; Denari; Doris; Faith; Gigi Jasmine; Ibifubara; Imisi; Isabella; Ivatar; Jason Jae; Joanna; Kaybobo; Kola; Koyin; Kuture; Mensan; Mide; Otega; Rooboy; Sabrina; Sultana; Thelma Lawson; Tracy; Zita	Big Soso; Bright Morgan; Dede; Denari; Doris; Faith; Gigi Jasmine; Imisi; Isabella; Ivatar; Jason Jae; Joanna; Kaybobo; Kayikunmi; Kola; Koyin; Mensan; Mide; Otega; Sultana; Thelma Lawson; Victory; Zita	Big Soso; Bright Morgan; Dede; Denari; Doris; Gigi Jasmine; Imisi; Isabella; Ivatar; Joanna; Kaybobo; Kola; Koyin; Kuture; Mide; Rooboy; Sultana; Thelma Lawson; Tracy; Victory	No; Eviction	Big Soso; Bright Morgan; Dede; Denari; Doris; Imisi; Isabella; Ivatar; Jason Jae; Joanna; Kaybobo; Kola; Koyin; Kuture; Mide; Rooboy; Sultana; Thelma Lawson; Tracy	Bright Morgan; Denari; Faith; Imisi; Isabella; Jason Jae; Kola; Koyin; Kuture; Mensan; Mide; Sultana; Tracy; Zita	Bright Morgan; Dede; Isabella; Jason Jae; Joanna; Kaybobo; Kola; Koyin; Kuture; Mensan; Mide; Sultana; Thelma Lawson	Dede; Faith; Imisi; Isabella; Jason Jae; Kola; Koyin; Mide; Rooboy; Zita	Dede; Faith; Imisi; Isabella; Jason Jae; Kaybobo; Kola; Koyin; Mensan; Sultana		
Ejected	No; Eviction	None	None	None	No; Eviction	None	None	None	None	Faith		
Walked	No; Eviction	None	Sabrina	None	No; Eviction	None	None	None	None	None		
Evicted	No; Eviction	Ibifubara; 0.35% votes to save	Otega; 1.22% votes to save	Gigi Jasmine; 1.51% votes to save	No; Eviction	Ivatar; 1.14% votes to save	Denari; 1.42% votes to save	Thelma Lawson; 3.27% votes to save	Zita; 1.49% votes to save	Kaybobo; 1.72% votes to win	Isabella; 3.07% votes to win	
Evicted	No; Eviction	Ibifubara; 0.35% votes to save	Otega; 1.22% votes to save	Gigi Jasmine; 1.51% votes to save	No; Eviction	Doris; 1.79% votes to save	Denari; 1.42% votes to save	Joanna; 3.70% votes to save	Rooboy; 2.36% votes to save	Mensan; 3.54% votes to win	Jason Jae; 4.24% votes to win	
Evicted	No; Eviction	Danboskid; 0.80% votes to save	Kayikunmi; 1.26% votes to save	Victory; 2.15% votes to save	No; Eviction	Big Soso; 1.93% votes to save	Tracy; 2.23% votes to save	Bright Morgan; 3.88% votes to save	Mide; 5.62% votes to save	Kola; 5.48% votes to win	Sultana; 7.94% votes to win	
Evicted	No; Eviction	Danboskid; 0.80% votes to save	Kayikunmi; 1.26% votes to save	Victory; 2.15% votes to save	No; Eviction	Big Soso; 1.93% votes to save	Tracy; 2.23% votes to save	Kuture; 4.54% votes to save	Mide; 5.62% votes to save	Koyin; 15.23% votes to win	Dede; 15.94% votes to win	
Survived	No; Eviction	Denari; 1.22% votes to save Joanna; 1.37% votes to save Sabrina; 1.55% votes to save Rooboy; 1.72% votes to save Ivatar; 2.06% votes to save Zita; 2.09% votes to save Isabella; 2.13% votes to save Bright Morgan; 2.31% votes to save Tracy; 2.71% votes to save Thelma Lawson; 2.76% votes to save Doris; 2.83% votes to save Kaybobo; 2.90% votes to save Mide; 2.97% votes to save Faith; 2.98% votes to save Kuture; 3.47% votes to save Otega; 3.48% votes to save Mensan; 3.64% votes to save Gigi Jasmine; 3.69% votes to save Big Soso; 4.46% votes to save Sultana; 4.58% votes to save Kola; 6.66% votes to save Jason Jae; 6.86% votes to save Dede; 7.57% votes to save Koyin; 10.02% votes to save Imisi; 12.85% votes to save	Ivatar; 1.36% votes to save Victory; 1.60% votes to save Gigi Jasmine; 1.84% votes to save Joanna; 1.93% votes to save Bright Morgan; 2.44% votes to save Doris; 2.51% votes to save Zita; 2.52% votes to save Thelma Lawson; 2.59% votes to save Denari; 2.90% votes to save Isabella; 3.06% votes to save Mide; 3.68% votes to save Mensan; 3.73% votes to save Kaybobo; 3.93% votes to save Big Soso; 4.45% votes to save Sultana; 4.86% votes to save Jason Jae; 5.37% votes to save Faith; 7.23% votes to save Kola; 8.11% votes to save Dede; 10.08% votes to save Koyin; 10.66% votes to save Imisi; 12.68% votes to save	Ivatar; 2.22% votes to save Doris; 2.25% votes to save Thelma Lawson; 2.45% votes to save Joanna; 2.46% votes to save Bright Morgan; 2.55% votes to save Big Soso; 2.58% votes to save Rooboy; 2.80% votes to save Kuture; 2.98% votes to save Isabella; 3.05% votes to save Tracy; 3.27% votes to save Kaybobo; 4.48% votes to save Mide; 4.51% votes to save Denari; 4.63% votes to save Sultana; 5.71% votes to save Kola; 8.19% votes to save Dede; 10.63% votes to save Koyin; 11.75% votes to save Imisi; 19.84% votes to save	No; Eviction	Rooboy; 1.96% votes to save Tracy; 2.04% votes to save Denari; 2.13% votes to save Joanna; 2.44% votes to save Thelma Lawson; 2.45% votes to save Bright Morgan; 2.49% votes to save Kuture; 2.71% votes to save Isabella; 2.72% votes to save Mide; 3.60% votes to save Kaybobo; 3.74% votes to save Sultana; 6.48% votes to save Jason Jae; 6.66% votes to save Kola; 8.39% votes to save Koyin; 11.76% votes to save Dede; 11.86% votes to save Imisi; 23.71% votes to save	Bright Morgan; 2.78% votes to save Kuture; 3.10% votes to save Zita; 3.16% votes to save Isabella; 3.30% votes to save Mensan; 5.66% votes to save Jason Jae; 6.05% votes to save Mide; 6.40% votes to save Sultana; 8.33% votes to save Kola; 9.66% votes to save Faith; 10.08% votes to save Koyin; 11.88% votes to save Imisi; 25.18% votes to save	Kaybobo; 5.31% votes to save Mensan; 6.32% votes to save Mide; 6.39% votes to save Jason Jae; 7.36% votes to save Sultana; 9.28% votes to save Kola; 11.46% votes to save Isabella; 11.84% votes to save Koyin; 12.95% votes to save Dede; 13.69% votes to save	Jason Jae; 6.87% votes to save Isabella; 8.19% votes to save Kola; 8.79% votes to save Koyin; 11.83% votes to save Faith; 12.53% votes to save Dede; 13.68% votes to save Imisi; 28.64% votes to save	Imisi; 42.80% votes to win		
