= Temi Nkem =

Nigerian reality TV winner

Temitope "Temi Nkem" Chigbue
- Born: Temitope Nkemdilim Chigbue; June 23, 2005 (age 21); London, UK
- Occupations: Lifestyle Content Creator and Influencer
- Years active: 2026-present
- Known for: Winner Big Brother Naija season 11
- Television: Big Brother Naija

Temitope Nkemdilim Chigbue (born 23 June 2005), also known professionally as Temi Nkem is a British-Nigerian lifestyle content creator and influencer. In 2026, she won the eleventh season of Big Brother Naija, becoming the show's fifth female winner.

== Early life ==
Chigbue was born in London, United Kingdom to a father from Ibusa, Delta State, and a mother from Ebute Metta, Lagos State, making her of Igbo-Yoruba heritage. Before joining the show, she was studying Accounting and Finance.

== Career ==
In 2026, she participated in the Nigerian reality television show and won N90 million in cash, a brand new SUV and other prize package valued at N160 million. She plans to return to university to complete her education, with the hope of pursuing a programme related to treasury and finance.

She is also a content creator.

== Personal life ==
Speaking on the Hero's Therapy podcast, she disclosed that her mother suffered a stroke when she was 16, an event that changed their lives.
