= Kellyrae =

Nigerian singer and influencer

Kellyrae Sule
- Born: Kingsley Oritsetimeyin Sule; 29 September 1991 (age 34); Warri, Delta State, Nigeria
- Education: Delta State University, Abraka
- Occupations: Singer; Influencer; Actor
- Years active: 2019–present
- Known for: Winner of the BBNS9
- Television: Big Brother Naija
- Spouse: Kassia Sule (m. 2024)

Kingsley Oritsetimeyin Sule (born 29 September 1991), known professionally as Kellyrae, is a Nigerian singer, influencer and television personality. He won the ninth season of Big Brother Naija.

== Early life ==
Kellyrae is from the Urhobo ethnic group of Delta State. Born and raised in Warri, he completed his primary and secondary education there. He later attended Delta State University, Abraka, where he studied music.

== Career ==
=== Musical career ===
Kellyrae released his debut EP, Success EP, on October 18, 2020. The seven-track EP features guest appearances by Erigga and Graham D.

=== Big Brother Naija ===
Kellyrae and his wife, Kassia Sule, entered the ninth season of Big Brother Naija as "Double Kay." After being unpaired, Kellyrae continued and eventually won the season finale on October 6, 2024, with 35.95% of the total votes, surpassing Wanni's 32.48%. This victory earned him the ₦100 million grand prize.

== Personal life ==
Kellyrae married Kassia Sule in February 2024, after ten years together. They have one daughter.

== Filmography ==
=== Television ===
Year	Title	Role	Notes
2024	Big Brother Naija season 9	Contestant	Won
