= Big Brother Naija season 9 =

Nigerian reality TV show

Big Brother Naija
- Season 9
- Presented by: Ebuka Obi-Uchendu
- No. of days: 71
- No. of housemates: 28
- Winner: Kingsley "KellyRae" Sule
- Runner-up: Wanni Danbaki

Release
- Original network: Africa Magic
- Original release: 28 July – 6 October 2024

Season chronology
- ← Previous; Season 8 Next → Season 10

Big Brother Naija Season 9, also known as Big Brother Naija: No Loose Guard, is the ninth season of the Nigerian version of the reality show Big Brother. It premiered on 28 July 2024 on DStv channel 198 and GOtv channel 49. Ebuka Obi-Uchendu returned as the host for the eighth consecutive time.

== Housemates ==
Housemate	Pairs	Age on entry	Occupation	Origin	Day entered	Day exited	Status
Kingsley "Kellyrae" Sule	DoubleKay	34	Professional singer	Delta State	0	70	Won
Wanni Danbaki	WanniXHandi	27	Disc jockey	Kaduna State	0	70	Runner-up
Onyeka Chigbo	Chekas	29	Lawyer; Entrepreneur	Anambra State	0	70	3rd Place
Victoria Onyenwere Uchechi	Shatoria	25	Travel consultant Commercial model	Imo State	0	70	4th Place
Nnenna "Nelly" Mbonu	Nelita	29	Chef; Entertainer	Abia State	0	70	5th Place
Ozumba "Ozee" Mbadiwe	Mbadiwe Twins	38	Lawyer; Entertainer; Entrepreneur	Imo State	0	70	6th Place
Anita Ukah	Nelita	29	Specialist practitioner Model; Entrepreneur	Imo State	0	70	7th Place
Samuel "Sooj" Osuji	Aces	23	Communications specialist	Imo State	0	70	8th Place
Oseloka "Ocee" Mbadiwe	Mbadiwe Twins	38	Lawyer; Entertainer; Entrepreneur	Imo State	0	63	Evicted
Joseph Bassey Christopher	Aces	24	Public relations analyst	Lagos State	0	63	Evicted
Kassia Sule	DoubleKay	30	Entrepreneur	Delta State	0	63	Evicted
Shaun Okojie	Shatoria	28	Actor; Model; Entrepreneur	Edo State	0	56	Evicted
Tunji Adeniji "Tjay" Soji	Beta	33	Medical doctor	Ogun State	0	56	Evicted
Handi Danbaki	WanniXHandi	27	Disc jockey	Kaduna State	0	56	Evicted
Chizoba Chigbo	Chekas	31	Software developer	Anambra State	0	49	Evicted
Benjamin Eseoghene Olufemi	Beta	29	Club influencer	Delta State	0	49	Evicted
Femi "Fairme David" David	Radicals	29	Professional dancer Content creator	Delta State	0	35	Evicted
Michael "Michky" Adeleye	Radicals	24	Gym instructor	Edo State	0	35	Evicted
Chinwe Elibe	Zinwe	30	Beauty and skincare entrepreneur	Imo State	0	28	Evicted
Zion Ogiefa	Zinwe	26	Model; Fashion designer	Edo State	0	28	Evicted
Flora "DJ Flo" Chiedo	Floruish	27	Disc jockey	Imo State	0	21	Evicted
Ruth "Rhuthee" Akpan	Floruish	32	Event planner Caterer	Akwa Ibom State	0	21	Evicted
Mayowa "Mayor Frosh" Adewumi	Streeze	24	Media director Content creator	Oyo State	0	21	Evicted
Ogunyemi Oluwatobi "Toby Forge" Feyishola	Streeze	27	Dance artist Content creator	Ondo State	0	21	Evicted
Mary Nneamaka Nwafor	Ndi Nne	22	Entrepreneur	Anambra State	0	14	Evicted
Precious Chiamaka "Chinne" Nwafor	Ndi Nne	31	Entrepreneur	Anambra State	0	14	Evicted
Damilola Eniola Ojo	Tami	28	Nightlife PR manager	Osun State	0	7	Evicted
Oluwatoyosi Precious Bakare	Tami	26	Beautician	Osun State	0	7	Evicted

The launch night (28 July) is marked as Day 0.

== Head of House ballot records ==
During the first three weeks of the season, the pairs were required to vote for their preferred Head of House. The pair that receives the most votes wins the title of Head of House, which at this time did not come with immunity.

	Week 1	Week 2	Week 3
Aces	Radicals	Shatoria	Nelita
Beta	Chekas	Nelita	Nelita
Chekas	Tami	WanniXHandi	Nelita
DoubleKay	Radicals	Ndi Nne	Nelita
Floruish	Mbadiwe Twins	Zinwe	Zinwe
Mbadiwe Twins	Zinwe	Ndi Nne	Nelita
Nelita	Streeze	Aces	Mbadiwe Twins
Radicals	DoubleKay	Ndi Nne	Chekas
Shatoria	WanniXHandi	Nelita	Nelita
Streeze	Nelita	Radicals	Nelita
WanniXHandi	Shatoria	Zinwe	Nelita
Zinwe	Floruish	Floruish	Floruish
Ndi Nne	Mbadiwe Twins; Mbadiwe Twins	DoubleKay	
Tami	Beta		

== Voting history and nominations table ==
	Pairing, Custodian Challenge and HOH ballot phase			Pairing and Housemate nomination phase		Individuals phase							Nominations & votes received
	Week 1	Week 2	Week 3	Week 4	Week 5	Week 6	Week 7	Week 8	Week 9	Week 10			Nominations & votes received
Custodians	Ndi Nne	Streeze	WanniXHandi	none									Nominations & votes received
Head of House	Mbadiwe Twins	Ndi Nne	Nelita	Nelita	Shatoria	Onyeka	Tjay	Sooj	Kellyrae	none			Nominations & votes received
Kellyrae	Chekas	Did Not Vote	Radicals; Streeze	Chekas; Beta	Chekas; Radicals	No Voting	Onyeka; Shaun	Onyeka; Shaun	Onyeka; Wanni	Winner; Day 70			14
Wanni	Tami	Did Not Vote	Floruish; Streeze	Zinwe; DoubleKay	Radicals; DoubleKay	No Voting	Kellyrae; Sooj	Anita; Kellyrae	Nelly; Anita	Runner Up; Day 70			9
Onyeka	Bottom Four	Did Not Vote	Floruish; Streeze	Zinwe; DoubleKay	Nelita; Aces	Head Of; House	Kellyrae; Victoria	Kassia; Victoria	Kassia; Victoria	Third Place; Day 70			10
Victoria	Tami	Did Not Vote	Floruish; Streeze	Zinwe; Beta	Aces; Radicals	No Voting	Chizoba; Sooj	Onyeka; Nelly	Nelly; Topher	Fourth Place; Day 70			11
Nelly	Tami	Did Not Vote	Streeze; Floruish	DoubleKay; Mbadiwe Twins	Radicals; WanniXHandi	No Voting	Victoria; Ozee	Ocee; Wanni	Ocee; Kassia	Fifth Place; Day 70			11
Ozee	Tami	Did Not Vote	Floruish; Streeze	Beta; Zinwe	DoubleKay; Radicals	No Voting	Ben; Kassia	Anita; Nelly	Nelly; Anita	Sixth Place; Day 70			6
Anita	Tami	Did Not Vote	Streeze; Floruish	DoubleKay; Mbadiwe Twins	Radicals; WanniXHandi	No Voting	Ozee; Shaun	Shaun; Wanni	Kassia; Victoria	Seventh Place; Day 70			8
Sooj	Streeze	Did Not Vote	Radicals; Streeze	Beta; Zinwe	Radicals; Beta	No Voting	Kassia; Kellyrae	Handi; Victoria	Wanni; Victoria	Eighth Place; Day 70			8
Ocee	Tami	Did Not Vote	Floruish; Streeze	Beta; Zinwe	DoubleKay; Radicals	No Voting	Ben; Nelly	Anita; Nelly	Nelly; Anita	Evicted (Day 63)			4
Topher	Streeze	Did Not Vote	Radicals; Streeze	Beta; Zinwe	Radicals; Beta	No Voting	Big Brothers choice to nominate	Wanni; Handi	Ozee; Victoria	Evicted (Day 63)			5
Kassia	Chekas	Did Not Vote	Radicals; Streeze	Chekas; Beta	Chekas; Radicals	Voting	Sooj; Topher	Tjay; Nelly	Onyeka; Ozee	Evicted (Day 63)			17
Chinwe	Tami	Bottom Four	Radicals; Streeze	WanniXHandi; Chekas	Evicted (Day 28)				Returned (Day 60)	Left (Day 63)			6
Damilola	Bottom Four	Evicted (Day 7)							Returned (Day 60)	Left (Day 63)			8
Rhuthee	Tami	Bottom; Four	Bottom; Four	Evicted (Day 21)					Returned (Day 60)	Left (Day 63)			5
Shaun	Tami	Did Not Vote	Floruish; Streeze	Zinwe; Beta	Aces; Radicals	No Voting	Kellyrae; Chizoba	Anita; Kassia	Evicted (Day 56)				5
Tjay	Tami	Did Not Vote	Bottom; Four	Zinwe; DoubleKay	DoubleKay; Aces	No Voting	Kassia; Sooj	Onyeka; Kassia	Evicted (Day 56)				7
Handi	Tami	Did Not Vote	Floruish; Streeze	Zinwe; DoubleKay	Radicals; DoubleKay	No Voting	Sooj; Kellyrae	Nelly; Tjay	Evicted (Day 56)				6
Chizoba	Bottom Four	Did Not Vote	Floruish; Streeze	Zinwe; DoubleKay	Nelita; Aces	No Voting	Victoria; Kassia	Evicted (Day 49)					6
Ben	Tami	Did Not Vote	Bottom; Four	Zinwe; DoubleKay	DoubleKay; Aces	No Voting	Victoria; Kassia	Evicted (Day 49)					7
Fairme David	Bottom Four	Bottom Four	Bottom; Four	Shatoria; WanniXHandi	WanniXHandi; Mbadiwe Twins	Evicted (Day 35)							6
Michky	Bottom Four	Bottom Four	Bottom; Four	Shatoria; WanniXHandi	WanniXHandi; Mbadiwe Twins	Evicted (Day 35)							6
Zion	Tami	Bottom Four	Radicals; Streeze	WanniXHandi; Chekas	Evicted (Day 28)								6
DJ Flo	Tami	Bottom; Four	Bottom; Four	Evicted (Day 21)									5
Mayor Frosh	Bottom Four	Ndi Nne	Bottom; Four	Evicted (Day 21)									9
Toby Forge	Bottom Four	Ndi Nne	Bottom; Four	Evicted (Day 21)									9
Chinne	Tami	Bottom Four	Evicted (Day 14)										1
Nne	Tami	Bottom Four	Evicted (Day 14)										1
Toyosi	Bottom Four	Evicted (Day 7)											8
Note	1	2	3										
Immunity Challenge Winners	Beta	Mbadiwe Twins	Nelita	none									
Nominated	All Housemates			Beta; Chekas; DoubleKay; WanniXHandi; Zinwe	Aces; DoubleKay; Radicals; WanniXHandi	none	Ben; Chizoba; Kassia; Kellyrae; Ozee; Shaun; Sooj; Topher; Victoria	Anita; Handi; Kassia; Nelly; Onyeka; Shaun; Tjay; Victoria; Wanni	Anita; Kassia; Nelly; Ocee; Onyeka; Ozee; Topher; Victoria; Wanni	Anita; Kellyrae; Nelly; Onyeka; Ozee; Sooj; Victoria; Wanni			
Bottom Four	Chekas; Radicals; Streeze; Tami	Floruish; Ndi Nne; Radicals; Zinwe	Beta; Floruish; Radicals; Streeze	none									
Custodian's Power	Radicals (Save Only)	Evict Only	Beta (Save Only)	none									
Evicted	Tami; 8 of 10 votes to evict	Ndi Nne; Streeze's choice to evict	Streeze; 8 of 16 votes to evict	Zinwe; 12.70% to save	Radicals; 10.36% to save	No; Eviction	Chizoba; 3.94% to save	Tjay; 1.04% to save	Ocee; 0.32% to save	Sooj; 1.18% to win	Anita; 2.73% to win	Ozee; 3.53% to win	
Evicted	Tami; 8 of 10 votes to evict	Ndi Nne; Streeze's choice to evict	Floruish; 5 of 16 votes to evict	Zinwe; 12.70% to save	Radicals; 10.36% to save	No; Eviction	Ben; 7.43% to save	Handi; 3.99% to save	Topher; 6.32% to save	Nelly; 4.44% to win	Victoria; 8.23% to win	Onyeka; 11.46% to win	
Evicted	Tami; 8 of 10 votes to evict	Ndi Nne; Streeze's choice to evict	Floruish; 5 of 16 votes to evict	Zinwe; 12.70% to save	Radicals; 10.36% to save	No; Eviction	Ben; 7.43% to save	Shaun; 8.94% to save	Kassia; 7.85% to save	Wanni; 32.48% to win			
Survived	Chekas; 1 of 10 votes to evict Streeze; 1 of 10 votes to evict	Floruish; Radicals; Zinwe	Radicals; 3 of 16 votes to evict	Beta; 14.04% to save Chekas; 17.34% to save WanniXHandi; 23.74% to save Doublekay; 32.12% to save	Aces; 17.73% to save WanniXHandi; 32.15% to save DoubleKay; 39.76% to save	No; Eviction	Sooj; 8.33% to save Ozee; 9.74% to save Kassia; 10.02% to save Shaun; 10.10% to save Topher; 12.38% to save Victoria; 12.50% to save Kellyrae; 25.56% to save	Victoria; 11.07% to save Wanni; 13.05% Onyeka; 13.90% to save Anita; 13.99% to save Nelly; 15.83% to save Kassia; 18.19% to save	Ozee; 9.13% to save Anita; 10.23% to save Victoria; 11.87% to save Nelly; 14.90% to save Onyeka; 16.31% to save Wanni; 22.73% to save	Kellyrae; 35.95% to win			

== Pairs voting and percentages ==
This includes the voting results for the bottom four twist from weeks 1-3, as well as individual pair results before pair nominations in week 4.

	Week 1	Week 2	Week 3
Aces	7.62%	8.14%	12.58%
Beta	Immunity; Holder	5.70%	7.06%
Chekas	5.12%	14.78%	13.73%
DoubleKay	13.73%	18.46%	21.08%
Floruish	5.28%	1.90%	6.25%
Mbadiwe Twins	8.21%	Immunity; Holder	8.34
Nelita	13.70%	12.42%	Immunity; Holder
Radicals	4.81%	5.61%	6.34%
Shatoria	10.74	9.84%	9.43%
Streeze	4.58%	Custodians	5.60%
WanniXHandi	16.91%	15.27%	Custodians
Zinwe	7.10%	3.70%	9.59%
Ndi Nne	Custodians	4.18%	
Tami	2.21%		
