= Imisi =

Nigerian reality TV star

Opeyemi "Imisi" Ayanwale
- Imisi at 2026 AMVCA
- Born: January 24, 2002 (age 24); Awe Town, Oyo State
- Occupations: Fashion Designer and Actress
- Years active: 2025-Present
- Known for: Big Brother Naija season 10
- Television: Big Brother Naija

Opeyemi "Imisi" Ayanwale (born 24 January 2002) is a Nigerian reality television personality, fashion designer and actress best known as the winner of Big Brother Naija Season 10.

== Early life and education ==
Ayanwale hails from Awe town in Oyo State, Nigeria. She graduated from Yaba College of Technology.

== Career ==
Before gaining national recognition, Ayanwale worked as a fashion designer.

Ayanwale became widely known as a housemate on Big Brother Naija Season 10, which premiered in July 2025. After 10 weeks on the show, she emerged as the winner of the season, becoming the fourth woman to win the franchise and receiving a prize package reported to include ₦80 million in cash and a sport utility vehicle. and other benefits expected to amount to N150 million grand prize.
